= List of Vital Signs band members =

Vital Signs
- Origin: Rawalpindi, Punjab, Pakistan
- Genres: Pop rock
- Years active: 1986–1998

This is the line-up of Vital Signs, a Pakistani pop rock band formed in Rawalpindi in 1986 by keyboardist, Rohail Hyatt, and bassist, Shahzad Hasan, who were soon joined by guitarist, Nusrat Hussain and vocalist, Junaid Jamshed. They were widely known as Pakistan's first and most successful pop band and were given the title of "pioneers of pop music".

The band initially gained prominence from their music video of the song "Dil Dil Pakistan" directed by Shoaib Mansoor; the song which later on became a critical hit and was voted as the third most popular song of all time by BBC World. Their 1991 studio album, Vital Signs 2, saw the band to travel to perform in United States and thus becoming the first Pakistani pop act to go abroad on a tour. Their second album consist hit singles, "Sanwali Salon", "Ajnabi" and "Aisay Hum Jiyain". The group also headed out with director Shoaib Mansoor to film Guitar ‘93, a Pepsi-financed venture featuring videos shot all across Pakistan.

After the release of their fourth studio album, Hum Tum, the band concentrated on their personal projects and Vital Signs drifted away. Junaid Jamshed went on to pursue a career as a solo singer, Shahzad Hasan concentrated on his work as a music producer and Rohail Hyatt formed a production company.

The following is a list of musicians who have performed in Pakistani rock band Vital Signs.

== Final members ==
Rohail Hyatt

- Active: 1986–1998
- Instruments: keyboards, guitars
- Release contributions: "Vital Signs 1" (1989), "Vital Signs 2" (1991), "Aitebar" (1993), "Hum Tum" (1995)

Rohail Hyatt was a founding member of Vital Signs, the leading pop band of Pakistan for a decade. He was an integral part of the internal creative core and the entire management of the band. Together, Vital Signs produced four albums and were under contract with Pepsi Cola from 1991 to 1997. Rohail played the role of band member, producer, song writer, guitarist and keyboardist at different times of the band's history. The first hit for Vital Signs was 'Dil Dil Pakistan', which was voted the 3rd most popular song in the world by a poll carried out by BBC World. The band's manager, Rohail's elder brother Zahid, introduced them to Shoaib Mansoor, who played an important role in leading the group to success. Rohail has also acted in Dhundle Raste (Television mini-series). Since Vital Signs disbanded ten years ago, Rohail's portfolio has grown in leaps and bounds. As the CEO of Pyramid Productions, Rohail made his mark on the production industry in Pakistan. Rohail made waves in mid-2007 with his film score for Shoaib Mansoor's debut film Khuda Kay Liye. Rohail is currently Coca Cola's music consultant in Pakistan producing a music program named Coke Studio which has received critical acclaim in Pakistan.

Junaid Jamshed

- Active: 1986–1998 (died 2016)
- Instruments: lead vocals
- Release contributions: "Vital Signs 1" (1989), "Vital Signs 2" (1991), "Aitebar" (1993), "Hum Tum" (1995)

Junaid Jamshed (born 3 September 1964 – died 7 December 2016) was a Pakistani recording artist who gained fame as the frontman of the pop group, Vital Signs in 1987 with the hit song, Dil Dil Pakistan, and remained in demand throughout the 1990s. In 1994, he released his debut solo album, Junaid of Vital Signs, which also quickly became a national hit, followed by Us Rah Par in 1999 and Dil Ki Baat in 2002. Since then, he focused on Islam and concentrated on reciting nasheeds. His debut religious album, Jalwa-e-Janan was released in 2005 and was followed by Mehboob-e-Yazdaan in 2006, Badr-ud-Duja in 2008, and Badee-uz-Zaman in 2009. He also ran a boutique with the name "J.", read as "Jay Dot", which has several outlets all over Pakistan. He died in a plane crash in Pakistan on 7 December 2016.

Shahzad Hasan

- Active: 1986–1998
- Instruments: bass
- Release contributions: "Vital Signs 1" (1989), "Vital Signs 2" (1991), "Aitebar" (1993), "Hum Tum" (1995)
The final members of Vital Signs
Rohail Hyatt
keyboards

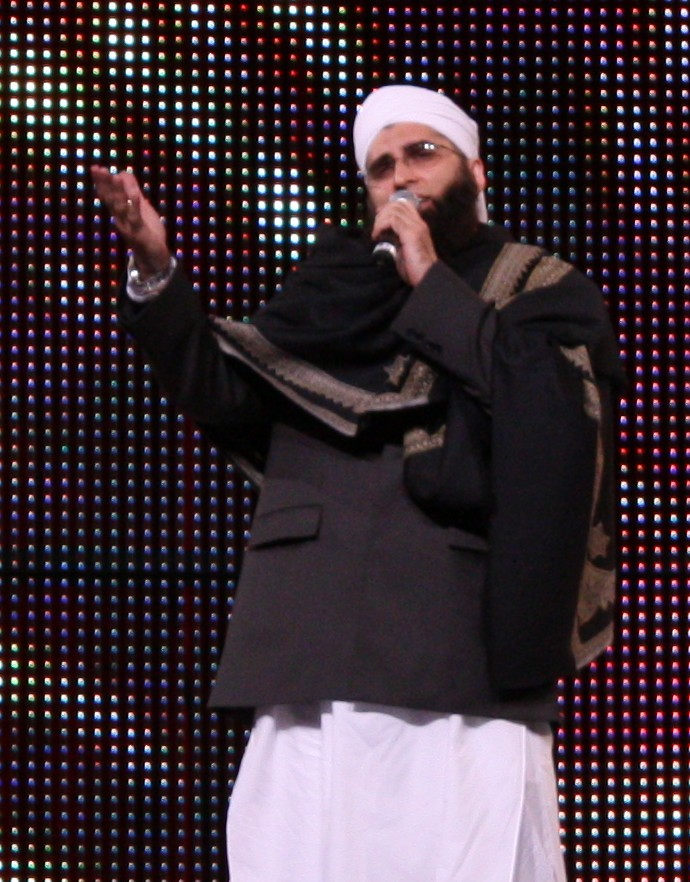
Junaid Jamshed
vocals

== Former members ==
Nusrat Hussain

- Active: 1986–1988
- Instruments: keyboards, guitars
- Release contributions: "Dil Dil Pakistan" (1987)

Nusrat Hussain is a Pakistani singer-songwriter, composer and keyboardist. Known best for his composition of the hit song "Dil Dil Pakistan" during his time at the Pakistani pop rock band Vital Signs. When Salman Ahmed, a member of the Vital Signs left the band and went on his separate way, Nusrat joined him to form a new band with Ali Azmat as lead vocalist. After spending some time with Vital Signs and Junoon, Hussain ventured on his own and released a solo album titled Amrit. It was a sincere effort that reflected Nusrat's skills and experience in the music industry. Currently, Nusrat Hussain is a professional pilot and flies the Boeing 777 of Qatar Airways as a Captain.

Salman Ahmad

- Active: 1989–1990
- Instruments: guitars
- Release contributions: "Vital Signs 1" (1989)

Salman Ahmad (born 12 December 1963) is a Pakistani singer-songwriter, composer, lead guitarist and actor whose work includes one solo albums, Infiniti, released in 2005. While still enjoying the success of Junoon, he was involved in two documentaries with the BBC and is also a UN Goodwill Ambassador for HIV/AIDS. Ahmad is working towards spreading awareness about HIV in South Asia, and helping to bring peace between Pakistan and India. Ahmad is currently teaching at Queens College, City University of New York. Although Junoon's two other core members, Ali Azmat and Brain O'Connell, left the band in 2005, Salman Ahmad continues to perform as a solo artist under the "Junoon" label and has moved to New York after his solo career failed to take off in Pakistan.

Rizwan-ul-Haq

- Active: 1990–1993
- Instruments: piano, guitars
- Release contributions: "Vital Signs 2" (1989), "Aitebar" (1993)

Aamir Zaki

- Active: 1994–1995 (died 2017)
- Instruments: guitars
- Release contributions: "Hum Tum" (1995)

Aamir Zaki is a notable Pakistani prolific guitar player, playing jazz, blues, classical, rock and alternative rock. Zaki released his debut album Signature in 1995. To-date, it is his only full-length studio recording release. Zaki also played briefly with the Vital Signs, circa 1994. He has also played with Suroor. Zaki died on 2 June 2017 after suffering a heart attack due to his prolonged depression.

== Guest appearances ==
Years	Artist	Albums / songs	Instrument	Contribution
1993, 1994–1995	Asad Ahmed	Only live	guitars	Played on the 1993 and 1995 studio albums, Aitebar and Hum Tum
