= Vital Signs discography =

- Studio albums: 4
- Compilation albums: 2
- Singles: 10
- Video albums: 1
- Music videos: 18
- Remix albums: 1

Vital Signs was a Pakistani pop band formed in Rawalpindi in 1986 by keyboardist, Rohail Hyatt, and bassist, Shahzad Hasan, who were soon joined by guitarist, Nusrat Hussain and vocalist, Junaid Jamshed. The band released four studio albums, as well as two compilations, ten singles, one video album, one remix album and several music videos. Guitarist Nusrat Hussain left the band after the band's first single release and was replaced by Salman Ahmad. They released their self-titled debut album in 1989; which had the single hit "Dil Dil Pakistan". Salman was later replaced by lead guitarist Rizwan-ul-Haq who played on the second album Vital Signs 2 released in 1991. In 1993, Rizwan-ul-Haq left the band to join Awaz and replaced by Aamir Zaki. Zaki played lead guitars on the third and fourth studio albums.

The band initially gained prominence from their music video of the song "Dil Dil Pakistan" directed by Shoaib Mansoor; the song which later on became a smash hit and was voted the third most popular song of all time by BBC World. Their 1991 studio album, Vital Signs 2 led the band to travel to perform in United States thus becoming the first Pakistani pop act to go abroad on a tour. Their second album features hit singles: "Sanwali Salon", "Ajnabi" and "Aisay Hum Jiyain". The group also headed out with director Shoaib Mansoor to film Guitar ‘93, a Pepsi-financed venture featuring videos shot all across Pakistan.

After the release of their fourth studio album, Hum Tum, the band concentrated on their personal projects and Vital Signs drifted apart. Junaid Jamshed went on to pursue a career as a solo singer, Shahzad Hasan concentrated on his work as a music producer and Rohail Hyatt formed a production company.

They were widely known as Pakistan's first and most successful pop band and were given the title "pioneers of pop music".

== Studio albums ==
Year	Album information
1989	Vital Signs 1: Released: 1989; Singles: "Dil Dil Pakistan", "Chehra"; Label: EMI: Pakistan
1991	Vital Signs 2: Released: 1991; Singles: "Rahi", "Yaad Ker Na"; Label: EMI: Pakistan
1993	Aitebar: Released: 1993; Singles: "Woh Kon Thee", "Teray Liyay", "Challa"
1995	Hum Tum: Released: 1995; Singles: "Hum Tum", "Un Ka Khayal", "Yehi Zameen"; Label: VCI

== Compilation albums ==
Year	Album information
2006	Very Best of Vital Signs Vol: 1: Released: 2006; Label: EMI Records
2006	Very Best of Vital Signs Vol: 2: Released: 2006; Label: EMI Records

== Video albums ==
Year	Album information
1995	Guitar '93: Greatest Hits: Released: 1995; Label: VCI Records; Producer: Shoaib Mansoor, Rohail Hyatt; Format: VCD
