= List of songs about Pakistan =

This is a list of songs about Pakistan (known as Milli naghmay, Urdu: ملی نغمے) listed in alphabetical order. The list includes songs by current and former solo-singers and musical bands. It also includes some film songs originally recorded for Pakistani films.

== List of songs ==
Song	Artists	Notes	Year
"Sab Ka Shajra Pakistan"	Atif Aslam	Released by ISPR on the occasion of Pakistan Day	2025
"Pooche Jo Naam Koi"	Sanam Marvi, Natasha Baig, Raisa Raisani, Bilal Ali, Zeek Afridi, Wasiq Malik	Released by ISPR on the occasion of Pakistan Day	2024
"Qurban Huye"	Rahat Fateh Ali Khan	Released by ISPR on the occasion of Defence and Martyrs Day	2023
"Pakistan National Anthem" (Remake)	Abid Brohi, Arif Lohar, Taj Mastani, Sehar Gul Khan, Sidra Kanwal, Amrina, Abdullah Qureshi, Bilal Saeed, Faakhir Mehmood, Humaira Javed, Umair Jaswal	Released by Government of Pakistan on the occasion of 75th Independence of Pakistan	2022
"Shad Rahe Pakistan"	Shuja Haider, Yashal Shahid	Released by ISPR on the occasion of Pakistan Day	2022
"Call of peace"	Sahir Ali Bagga	A song by Pakistan Navy.	2021
"Aik Qaum, Aik Manzil"	Ali Zafar, Aima Baig	Released by ISPR on the occasion of Pakistan Day	2021
"Dhanak Kay Rang"	Various artists	Compilation album of patriotic songs released by ISPR	2020
"Hari Ghari Tayyar" (Remake)	Ali Hamza, Ali Noor, Asim Azhar and Ali Azmat (originally sung by Khalid Waheed before 1980s)	Released by ISPR on the occasion of Defence Day	2020
"Humain Pyar Hai Pakistan Se"	Atif Aslam	Released by ISPR on the occasion of Defence Day	2019
"Jaan De Denge"	Ali Zafar	Released by Ali Zafar on the occasion of Pakistan Day	2019
"Pakistan Zindabad"	Sahir Ali Bagga	Released by ISPR on the occasion of Pakistan Day	2019
"Aman Ka Nishan Hamara Pakistan"	Shafqat Amanat Ali	Released by ISPR on the occasion of Pakistan Day	2018
"Hum Dekhenge"(Remake)	All artists season 11 coke studio	Coke studio season 11	2018
"Tu Salamat Watan"	Sahir Ali Bagga, Shafqat Amanat Ali, Hina Nasrullah, Faakhir	Released by ISPR on the occasion of Defence Day	2018
"Pakistan National Anthem" (Remake)	All artists season 10 coke studio	Coke studio season 10	2017
"Mulk-e-Khuda"	Abida Parveen	Song depicts the natural sites of Pakistan and each class of society	2017
"Jee Lay Har Pal"	Atif Aslam	Pepsi Pakistan	2017
"Shukriya Pakistan"	Rahat Fateh Ali Khan	Released on the occasion of Independence Day	2016
"Yaar Yaaron Se Hon Na Juda’"	Ali Zafar, Atif Aslam	Released by ISPR on the occasion of Defence Day	2016
"Aye Rah-e-Haq Ke Shaheedo" (Remake)	All the Artists	Coke Studio Season 9	2016
"Chand Sitara"	Salman Ahmad, Junaid Jamshed, Shahzad Hasan	Pepsi Pakistan	2015
"Tu Qadam Barhaaey Ja"	Jal	Tribute to Peshawar School Attack Victims	2015
"Urain Ge"	Ali Zafar	Tribute to Peshawar School Attack Victims	2014
"Naya Pakistan Insha'Allah"	Salman Ahmad, Junaid Jamshed, Shahi & Nusrat	Single	2013
"Mein Tou Dekhoonga"	Strings	Single	2011
"Rise Of Jazba"	Ali Zafar	Single	2011
"Apney Ulloo"	Shehzad Roy	Wasu Aur Mein	2011
"Kya Darta Hai"	Shehzad Roy	Released by Djuice Pakistan	2011
"Daanah Pah Daanah"	Akhtar Chanal Zahri featuring Komal Rizvi	Coke Studio Season 4: Episode 1	2011
"Woh Humsafar Tha"	Quaratulain Baloch originally performed by Abida Parveen in 1971)	Humsafar	2011
"Alif Allah (Jugni)"	Arif Lohar featuring Meesha Shafi	Coke Studio Season 3: Episode 1	2010
"Ab Khud Kuch Karna Paray Ga"	Strings featuring Atif Aslam	(Single)	2010
"Pak Fauj, Tu Zindabad"	Abrar ul Haq	Sar Utha Ke	2010
"Shor Macha"	Entity Paragdim	(Single)	2010
"Sadaa"	Laal (originally written by the satirical poet Habib Jalib in 1972)	Umeed e Sahar	2009
"Main Ney Usse Kaha"	Laal (originally written by the satirical poet Habib Jalib in 1964)	Umeed e Sahar	2009
"Umeed e Sahar"	Laal	Umeed e Sahar	2009
"Jaago"	Strings	Koi Aanay Wala Hai	2008
"Quaid e Azam"	Shehzad Roy	Qismat Apnay Haath Mein	2008
"Laga Reh"	Shehzad Roy	Qismat Apnay Haath Mein	2008
"Qismat Apnay Haath Mein"	Shehzad Roy	Qismat Apnay Haath Mein	2008
"Hum Se Hai Ye Zamana"	Call (the band)	(Single)	2007
"Humara Parcham"	Naheed Akhtar		2007
"Aasman"	Call The Band	(Single)	2007
"Aasman Ko Chootay Jayen"	Ali Zafar	Masty	2006
"Hum Aik Hain"	Shehzad Roy	Buri Baat Hai	2005
"Sab Se Pehlay Pakistan"	Ahmed Jahanzeb feat. Saraab	Independence Day 2004 Soundtrack	2004
"Chal Uth Chaliye"	Faakhir	Mantra	2004
"Humara Pehchaan"	Najam Sheraz	(Single)	2004
"Panchi"	Jal	Aadat	2004
"Mitti"	Strings	Dhaani	2004
"Geo Meray Jaanbaz"	Najam Sheraz featuring Shafqat Amanat Ali	(Single)	2004
"Dharti Hai Maan"	Abrar-ul-Haq	Nachan Main Audhay Naal	2004
Hamsen Tumse Pyar Hai	Jawad Ahmad	Jind Jan Sohniyie	2004
"Shaheen Shahpar"	Najam Sheraz	Yeh Moamla Koi Aur Hai	2004
"Dil Ki Qasam"	Noori	Suno Ke Mein Hun Jawan	2003
"Dil Se Mene Dekha Pakistan"	Haroon	Lagan	2003
"Hai Koi Hum Jaisa"	Strings	Hai Koi Hum Jaisa	2003
"Jeeyay"	Aaroh	Sawaal	2003
"Tere Bina Dil Na Lagay Pakistan"	Faakhir	Aatish (2000)	2002
"Dosti"	Jawad Ahmad	Uchayyan Majajan Aali	2002
"Dil Maangay Aur"	Junaid Jamshed	Dil Ki Baat	2001
"Dharti Kay Khuda"	Junoon	Ishq	2001
"Tu Hai Kahan"	Junaid Jamshed featuring Haroon and Strings	Tu Hai Kahan	2001
"Tu Hi Dildar Hai"	Jawad Ahmad	Bol Tujhay Kya Chahiye	2001
"Zamanay Kay Andaaz (Saqi Nama)"	Junoon (originally written by Muhammad Iqbal in 1920)	Ishq	2001
"Humari Shaan (Defence)"	Shehzad Roy	Dholna	2001
"Khwaab"	Strings	Duur	2000
"Ik Parcham Ke Neechay"	Mohammed Ali Shehki	(Single)	1999
"Intehai Shauq"	Hadiqa Kiani (national song for 1999 Pepsi Cricket World Cup)	(Single)	1999
"Qasam Us Waqt Ki"	Junaid Jamshed (originally performed by Mujeeb Alam in 1969)	(single)	1999
"Mera Paigham Pakistan"	Nusrat Fateh Ali Khan	(Single)	1999
"Meri Awaaz Suno"	Junoon	Parvaaz	1999
"Azadi"	Junoon	Azadi (OST of the movie Jinnah)	1997
"Jazba Junoon"	Junoon	Inquilaab	1997
"Tera Karam Maula"	Vital Signs	Hum Hain Pakistani	1997
"In Fizaon Se Aagay"	Najam Sheraz	(Single)	1997
"Aye Jawan"	Awaz	(Single)	1997
"Zinda Dil"	Awaz	Jadu Ka Chiraagh	1995
"Hum Hain Pakistani"	Vital Signs	Hum Tum	1995
"Hawa Ka Sipahi Hoon"	Najam Sheraz	Released by ISPR on the occasion of Air Force Day	1995
"Main Hon Pakistan"	Ali Haider	Aakash	1994
Ehtesaab	Junoon	Kashmakash	1994
Talaash	Junoon	Kashmakash	1993
"Watan Ki Mitti Gawah Rehna"	Nayyara Noor (written by Faiz Ahmad Faiz)	(Single)	1992
"Watan Kahani"	Awaz	Shola	1992
"Aise Hum Jeyain"	Vital Signs	Vital Signs 2	1991
"Chand Roshan, Chamakta Sitara Rahe"	Various Artists (reproduced in 1999 by Mehnaz Begum) (originally sung by Munawwar Sultana in 1958)	(Single)	1991
"Yehi Zameen"	Vital Signs	Vital Signs 1	1989
"Dil Dil Pakistan"	Vital Signs (covered by Mizraab in 2004)	(Single)	1987
"Dharti Hamari"	Zohaib Hassan	Hotline (Nazia and Zohaib)	1987
"Tum Se Hay Aye Mujahido"	Alamgir	(single)	1986
"Main Bhi Pakistan Hoon"	Muhammad Ali Shehki (reproduced by Awaz in 1995, album Jadu Ka Chiraagh)	(single)	1986
"Aye Dharti Panj Daryavan Di"	Alam Lohar	(single)	1985
"Itnay Baray Jeevan Sagar Main"	Allan Fakir	(single)	1985
"Hum Dekhain Gay"	Iqbal Bano (Sang in Lahore, against General Zia's military regime, written by famous poet Faiz)	(single)	1985
"Zameen ki goud rang se"	Mohammad Ifrahim (written by Asad Mohammad Khan, music composed by Sohail Rana for Pakistan Television)	(single)	1982
"Khayal Rakhna"	Alamgir featuring Benjamin Sisters	Hum Sab Ka Pakistan	1982
"Maaon Ki Dua"	Alamgir	Hum Sab Ka Pakistan	1982
"Aye Watan Hum Hain Teri Shama Ke Parwanon Mein"	Alamgir (written by Josh Malihabadi), music by Ghulam Nabi Abdul Latif, film Aag Ka Darya (1966))	Hum Sab Ka Pakistan	1982
"Is Parcham Ke Saye Talay Hum Eik Hain"	Benjamin Sisters	(Single)	1982
"Tera Pakistan Hai"	Amjad Hussain	(Single)	1982
"Jeevay Jeevay Pakistan"	Shahnaz Begum written by Jamiluddin Aali, music by Sohail Rana for Pakistan Television	(Single)	1974
"Hum Zinda Qaum Hain"	Originally sung by Benjamin Sisters, Tehseen Javed and Amjad Hussain. (reproduced in 1982 by Alamgir and Various Artists)	(Single)	1973
"Sohni Dharti Allah Rakhhay Qadam Qadam Abaad Tujhe"	Habib Wali Mohammad feat. Shahnaz Begum and. Mehdi Hassan written by Masroor Anwar, music by Sohail Rana, Pakistan Television	(Single)	1973
"Jaag Utha Hai Saara Watan"	Masood Rana and Shaukat Ali (reproduced by Alamgir in 1982)	(Single)	1965
"Mere Dhol Sipahiya"	Noor Jehan	(Single)	1965
"Apni Jaan Nazar Karoon"	Mehdi Hassan (written by Masroor Anwar)	(Single)	1965
"Aye Watan Pyare Watan"	Ustad Amanat Ali Khan written by Khalil Ahmed	(Single)	1965
"Aye Watan Key Sajiley Jawanoo"	Noor Jehan written by Jamiluddin Aali	(Single)	1965
"Aye Rah e Haq Ke Shaheedo"	Naseem Begum (lyrics by Saifuddin Saif), music by Salim Iqbal, film Madar-e-Watan (1966)	(Single)	1965
"Chand Meri Zameen Phool Mera Watan"	Ustad Amanat Ali Khan (reproduced in 1998 by Alamgir)	(Single)	1965
"Yeh Kavita Pakistani Hai"	Nighat Seema, written by Jamiluddin Aali	(Single)	1965
"Aye Puttar Hattan Tey Nai Vikdey"	Noor Jehan written by Ghulam Mustafa Tabassum for Radio Pakistan	(Single)	1965
"Yeh Watan Tumhara Hai"	Mehdi Hassan	(Single)	1962
"Aye Quaid e Azam Tera Ehsaan Hai Ehsaan"	Munawar Sultana written by Fayyaz Hashmi, film Bedari (1957 film)	(Single)	1957
"Hum Laayein Hain Toofan Se Kashti Nikal Ke"	Saleem Raza (written by Fayyaz Hashmi, film Bedari (1957)	(Single)	1957
