= Roshni (album) =

Studio album by Ali Zafar
- Released: 20 December 2025
- Genres: Acoustic pop Deep house
- Length: 40:05
- Languages: Punjabi; Urdu; English
- Labels: Lightingale; Silent Roar

Ali Zafar chronology
Teefa in Trouble (2018)	Roshni (2025)

Singles from Roshni
- 1. "Zalim Nazron Se"; 2. "Ruxaana"; 3. "Shiddat"

Roshni (Urdu: روشنی, lit. 'Light') is the fourth studio album and seventh overall album of Pakistani singer-songwriter Ali Zafar. It was released on 20 December 2025 by Lightingale Records via various music streaming services.

== Background ==
Ali Zafar, a Pakistani singer-songwriter, released his third studio album titled Jhoom in 2011. Since then, he has worked in a number of Hindi films. He debuted in Pakistani films with Teefa in Trouble in 2018. Meanwhile, he has also released three soundtrack albums. He also kept releasing singles, and launched a record label, titled Lightingale Records, in 2020.

== Promotion and release ==
Zafar announced his new album on 21 November 2025, when the music video of the first single "Zalim Nazron Se" was released in collaboration with Ali Haider; the two also premiered the song at the 2025 Hum Awards in Houston. At the Dubai International Cricket Stadium, Zafar premiered some of the album tracks during the opening ceremony of the 2025–26 International League T20, and announced the album title to be Roshni.

Zafar's alma mater, the National College of Arts, Lahore, hosted the launch event for the album on 19 December. The music video for the second single "Ruxaana" was released along with the complete album on 20 December. This is Zafar's fourth studio album after more than 14 years and 10 months since his last album. Consisting the tracks of acoustic pop and deep house genres, he called it as a celebration of Pakistani music icons, and "a journey through light and shadow" to "confront one's inner truths".

In January 2026, Zafar appeared on Hasna Mana Hai, a late-night show hosted by Tabish Hashmi on Geo News, to promote the album, and announced a social media challenge to conceptualize, create, and post the fan videos, based on any of the tracks from the album. The Express Tribune reported that hundreds of fan videos featuring "AI-generated visuals and experimental storytelling" were shared online. In April, 15 videos were shortlisted and published by Lightingale Records.

In May 2026, Zafar released third music video "Shiddat", derived from his painting for his 2002 thesis and directed by Fawaz Rehan and Ayelah Asim using the AI.

== Track listing ==
The album artwork along with the track listing was revealed on 6 December 2025. Musician Shani Arshad also collaborated with Zafar in producing some of the tracks; (Note: The song descriptions and personnel credits are extracted from YouTube.) he had also collaborated for Zafar's different projects since his debut album Huqa Pani (2003). The song "Chal Dil Mere" from his debut album is also recreated by Zafar himself in collaboration with Talha Anjum, a hip-hop artist and the most-streamed on Spotify Pakistan in 2025. The album also contains one of Jaun Elia's poetries, "Be Qarari Si", and a recreated track of the band Vital Signs' second album, "Saanvali Saloni" featuring Alistair Alvin. The album also features the remake of the critically acclaimed song "Mera Pyar" featuring DJ Shahrukh, originally performed by one of the most influential guitarist of Pakistan, Aamir Zaki, for his 1995 album Signature. (Note: Claims and information are extracted from Rafay Mahmood and Rahul Aijaz for The Express Tribune, Madeeha Syed for Dawn, and Waseem Siddiqui of VOA Urdu, along with Roshni album notes.) The song "Zalim Nazron Se" was originally created by Roshan Nagianvi and Jawaid Akhtar, and popularised by Ali Haider, which is itself an Urdu version of a Pashto song "Da Spogmayy Khorey" by Mashooq Sultan.

According to the album notes, the title song "Roshni" is dedicated to Zafar's wife, Ayesha Fazli, whom he calls the strength that kept him from collapsing into uncertainness. "Ruxaana" is described as a conversation about a boy's boundaries against a girl's madness, and shifts from Punjabi street poetry towards modern English attitude. The song "Mamacita" contains Punjabi flirtatious lyrics with a Latin melody, and features the character names Escobar and Rihanna. The songs like "5 Star" is called as an emotion between heartbreak and comfort, "Shiddat" as a devotion of choosing love when trust is broken into burns, "Dhoondta Hoon" as a repeated search of the doors of memory that will never open again, and "Tere Bin Mein" as a quiet truth about someone who surrenders to the risks of accepting a love.

No.	Title	Length
1.	"Ruxaana"	2:55
2.	"5 Star"	2:31
3.	"Mamacita" (featuring Alistair Alvin)	3:17
4.	"Saanvali Saloni" (featuring Alistair Alvin)	2:43
5.	"Roshni"	2:38
6.	"Shiddat"	3:27
7.	"Be Qarari Si"	3:56
8.	"Dhoondta Hoon"	3:58
9.	"Tere Bin Mein"	3:20
10.	"Chal Dil Mere" (featuring Talha Anjum)	3:52
11.	"Mera Pyar" (featuring DJ Shahrukh)	4:00
12.	"Zalim Nazron Se" (featuring Ali Haider)	3:28
Total length:		40:05

== Personnel ==
The credits are adapted from the album playlist on YouTube.

- Ali Zafar – vocals (all tracks); composer (tracks 1, 2, 4, 5, 6, 7); author (tracks 1, 2, 4, 5, 6); producer (tracks 1, 2, 4, 5, 6, 8, 10, 12)
- Alistair Alvin – featured artist and vocals (tracks 3, 4); composer, mixer, and masterer (track 3); programming (tracks 1, 4, 6, 7); producer (tracks 2, 3, 4, 6, 7); author (tracks 3, 4); drums (track 10)
- Talha Anjum – featured artist, rap vocals, and author (track 10)
- DJ Shahrukh – featured artist and producer (track 11)
- Ali Haider – featured artist and vocals (track 12)
- Irshad Sheikh – mixer and masterer (tracks 1, 2, 4, 5, 6, 7, 8, 9, 10, 11)
- Shani Arshad – programming (track 1); producer (tracks 1, 12); accordion (track 9); director (track 12)
- Shoaib Mansoor – author (track 4)
- Muhammad Aayan Saleem – composer (track 5)
- Hassan Badshah – producer (tracks 5, 8, 9); programming (track 5); synthesizer and keyboards (track 8); arranger (track 9)
- Jaun Elia – author (track 7)
- Syed Omar Hussain – composer and author (tracks 8, 9); producer (track 8)
- Amir Azhar – bass and guitar (track 8)
- Muzammil Hussain – guitar (track 9)
- Saeed Qureshi – composer and author (track 10)
- Vikraah – producer, guitar, and bass (track 10)
- Aamir Zaki – composer and author (track 11)
- Ali Mustafa – producer and programming (track 11)
- Roshan Naginavi – author (track 12)
- Jawaid Akhtar – composer (track 12)
