= Us Rah Par =

1999 Junaid Jamshed Khan album

Us Rah Par اس راہ پر

Studio album by Junaid Jamshed Khan
- Released: 1999
- Recorded: 1998–1999
- Genre: Pop
- Label: Sony BMG
- Producer: Junaid Jamshed Khan

Us Rah Par (Urdu: اُس راہ پر) is Pakistani pop singer Junaid Jamshed Khan's second solo effort, after Junaid and the rest of the band members took a break from the Vital Signs. It was critically and commercially successful. Like many other Vital Signs albums, Us Rah Par continued Junaid's collaboration with Shoaib Mansoor. The title track Us Rah Par is a slow blues number which featured a video directed by Bilal Maqsood (of the band Strings). However it was the techno flavored Na Tu Ayegi which actually gave the album the much needed commercial push. Three songs in the album are composed by Biddu

== Track listing ==
No.	Title	Music By	Lyricist	Producer
1.	"Aankhon Ko Aankhon Ne"	Junaid Jamshed Khan; Rohail Hyatt	Shoaib Mansoor	Kamran ("Kamijee") Khan
2.	"Us Rah Par"	Shoaib Mansoor; Junaid Jamshed Khan	Shoaib Mansoor	Kamran ("Kamijee") Khan
3.	"Na Tu Aaegi"	Shoaib Mansoor; Junaid Jamshed Khan; M. Ali	Shoaib Mansoor	Kamran ("Kamijee") Khan
4.	"Jab Say Huey"	Shoaib Mansoor; Junaid Jamshed Khan	Shoaib Mansoor	Aamir Zaki
5.	"Jaagi Re"	Salman Ahmad	Sabir Zafar	Salman Ahmad
6.	"Dil Main Jo"	Shoaib Mansoor; Junaid Jamshed Khan	Shoaib Mansoor	Aamir Zaki
7.	"Keh Do Jo Bhi"	Shoaib Mansoor; Junaid Jamshed Khan	Shoaib Mansoor	Kamran ("Kamijee") Khan; Faraz Anwar
8.	"O' Sanama"	Shoaib Mansoor; Junaid Jamshed Khan	Shoaib Mansoor	Kamran ("Kamijee") Khan
9.	"Sahib-e-Dil"	Shoaib Mansoor; Junaid Jamshed Khan	Shoaib Mansoor	Imran "Immu"
10.	"Kabhi Na Kabhi"	Shoaib Mansoor; Junaid Jamshed Khan	Shoaib Mansoor	Kamran ("Kamijee") Khan
11.	"Chand Ne"	Junaid Jamshed Khan	Shoaib Mansoor	Faakhir Mehmood
12.	"Qasam Us Waqt Ki"	Junaid Jamshed Khan	Shoaib Mansoor	Haroon Rashid

== See also ==
- Music of Pakistan
