= Dhundle Raste =

Pakistani television film

- Written by: Haseena Moin
- Directed by: Shoaib Mansoor
- Starring: Junaid Jamshed Khan; Vital Signs; Salman Ahmed; Rohail Hyatt; Shahzad Hasan; S. A. Rehman; Nayyar Kamal; Tabinda Sheikh
- Country of origin: Pakistan

Production
- Running time: 45 minutes

Original release
- Network: PTV
- Release: 1989

Dhundle Raste (Urdu: دھندلے راستے, English: Foggy Paths) is a Pakistani telefilm featuring Junaid Jamshed, Vital Signs, Salman Ahmed, Rohail Hyatt & Shahzad Hasan a popular Pakistani pop music group. It was written by Haseena Moin and directed by Shoaib Mansoor, who previously wrote and directed the television drama programme, Ankahi. The televised film featured music by the Pakistani pop group Vital Signs and has been noted for its association with the band's early television appearances.

== Cast ==
- Junaid Jamshed Khan
- Vital Signs
- Salman Ahmed
- Rohail Hyatt
- Shahzad Hasan (Shahi)
- S. A. Rehman
- Nayyar Kamal
- Tabinda Sheikh

== See also ==
- Vital Signs
- Shoaib Mansoor
- Haseena Moin
- Junaid Jamshed Khan
- Salman Ahmed
- Rohail Hyatt
- Shahzad Hasan (Shahi)
