= Nisar Nasik =

Pakistani poet (1943–2019)

- Born: February 15, 1939; Rawalpindi, British India (Now Pakistan)
- Died: July 3, 2019 (aged 80); Rawalpindi, Pakistan
- Occupation: Poet
- Known for: Writing the song Dil Dil Pakistan
- Works: Chothi Simat Ka Musafir; Dil Dil Pakistan
- Awards: Lifetime Achievement Award from Pakistan Television

Nisar Nasik (15 February 1939 – 3 July 2019) was a Pakistani poet.

== Career ==
He was born in Rawalpindi, Pakistan in 1939 and used to work for both Radio Pakistan and Pakistan Television. He was credited with writing the song "Dil Dil Pakistan", a highly popular patriotic song by the musical band Vital Signs first released in 1987.

== Awards and recognition ==
Pakistan Television awarded him the Lifetime Achievement Award for his contribution to Urdu literature.

== Bibliography ==
He wrote in Urdu and Punjabi languages. He also wrote two books:

- Chothi Simat Ka Musafir
- Dil Dil Pakistan.

== Death ==
Nisar Nasik died in Rawalpindi, Pakistan on 3 July 2019 after a protracted illness with many health issues including diabetes, amnesia and high blood pressure.
