= Jalwa-e-Janan =

Studio album by Junaid Jamshed
- Released: 2005
- Recorded: 2005
- Studio: Qtv
- Genre: Islamic Nasheeds
- Label: Heera Stereo
- Director: Khalil Warsi

Junaid Jamshed chronology
Jalwa-e-Janan	* Mehboob-e-Yazdaan

Jalwa-e-Janan (Urdu: جلوۂ جاناں) was the first religious and spiritual album released by former Pakistani pop singer, Junaid Jamshed.

Its most popular naat is 'Muhammad Ka Roza Qareeb Aaraha Hai, Bulandi Pe Apna Naseeb Aaraha Hai'.

== Track list ==
1. Jalwa-E-Janaa
2. Muhammad Ka Roza
3. Tu Ne Poochhi Hai (Poetry by Allama Iqbal)
4. Jagah Ji Lagane Ki (Poetry by Aziz al-Hasan Ghouri)
5. Multazim Par Dua (lllahi Teri Chokhat Par) (Poetry by Taqi Usmani)
6. Surah Al Muminoon
7. Yeh Subhe Madina
8. Rasha Makawa (Pashto)
9. Madad ae Mere Allah
10. Jalwa-E-Janaan (Extended)

== See also ==
- Badr-ud-Duja
