= Gulls & Guys =

1999 Pakistani travel guide documentary show

Gulls & Guys was a documentary travel guide reality show directed by Shoaib Mansoor. The programme was telecasted every Saturday on PTV in 1999. The show was sponsored by John Player Gold Leaf. Gulls & Guys was high grossing and gained popularity all over Pakistan.

== The concept ==
The main idea behind the serial was the exploration of the world. It was a travelogue concerning six of the 17 countries, which were on the stopover list of Discovery. Discovery was a Gold Leaf-sponsored yacht, which was to sail through 17 countries in just 170 days. Its trek, which was more commonly known as the "Voyage of Discovery," was the brainchild of British American Tobacco and is till now the biggest international promotion undertaken by any foreign company in Pakistan. This 80 ft tall Maxi racing yacht, captained by Joe Outred, on 18 June 1999, set out on its mission and had Karachi as its 12th destination. The arrival of Discovery was celebrated, in Pakistan, with a grand finale of Gulls & Guys held at the Marina Club, Karachi.

== The show ==
The show starred well-known show business figures in Pakistan including Junaid Jamshed, Salman Ahmad, Fakhr-e-Alam, Captain Abdullah Mahmood, Adnan Siddiqui and Shehryar Jehangir. Each celebrity was assigned one global destination. The show mostly included European cities of London, Paris, Madrid, Rome and Athens with the exception of one person sent to Cairo. After reaching their assigned country, the celebrities were ordered to produce and host their own travelogs in two-part episodes which were then telecast each week. Besides this, they were required to earn some money (equivalent to a day's meal) on their own, learn to cook the traditional or national food of their destined country, learn to count from zero to ten, and sing a song in their respective country's native language.

After the end of the series a finale show was to be held on 18 June 1999, the same day the Discovery was to reach Karachi. In the finale each participant was to be graded based upon the quality of their travelogs, the food they were to cook, and the counting of numerals and singing a song in their native language live in the finale show. The participant with the most aggregate points was to win.

== Assigned destinations ==
| Celebrity | City | Country |
|---|---|---|
| Salman Ahmad | London | England |
| Junaid Jamshed | Paris | France |
| Fakhar-e-Alam | Madrid | Spain |
| Adnan Siddiqui | Rome | Italy |
| Shehryar Jehangir | Athens | Greece |
| Capt. Abdullah Mahmood | Cairo | Egypt |
