= Chowk.com =

- Available in: English
- Website: www.chowk.com
- Launched: 1997
- Current status: Offline

Chowk.com was a website with a focus on the current affairs, politics and cultural aspects of India and Pakistan. Its stated goal is to provoke readers go beyond soundbites and uncover the truth, however uncomfortable. It was also a magazine that aimed to promote discourse between people of the subcontinent on various issues which affected their lives. The site appeared to become stale in March 2012.

== History ==
Chowk was launched in 1997 on the 50th independence anniversary of India and Pakistan with the mission to promote and nurture independent voices that question, dissect and examine the social, political, religious and cultural moorings of that region. Chowk's founding team included Safwan Shah, Umair Khan, Saima Shah, Ginni Dhindsa and Radhika Nagpal, who came together in the mid-1990s with the idea of a South Asian political and literary online magazine.

The site appeared to become stale in March 2012, with archives from 1 September 2012 showing no updates since March 2012. Subsequent archives of the homepage saw the site become unfunctional before showing a controlled site closed message from about 2014.

== Format ==
Chowk was updated daily with original articles, opinions, and commentary on current affairs, politics and cultural trends. In addition, Chowk publishes reviews, short stories, and poetry by new, upcoming writers of South Asian origin. Chowk also features services like blogs, photo galleries and discussion forums. Almost all of Chowk content was contributed by its members. Chowk published commentary, analysis and reviews alongside fiction and poetry. Chowk content was regularly republished by news websites, popular South Asian blogs and discussion groups.

== Columnists ==
Columnists at Chowk included:

- Pervez Hoodbhoy
- Beena Sarwar
- Veeresh Malik
- Nadeem F. Paracha
- Farzana Versey
- Jawahara Saidullah

== Sources ==
- Nazeem, M. Ayaz (2008). "10: Peace-Educational Value of the Word Wide Web: Dialogue and Confidence Building in Cyberspace — An analysis of Chowk.com". In Jing Lin; Edward J. Brantmeier; Christa Bruhn (eds.). Transforming Education for Peace. Chartlotte, North Carolina: Information Age Publishing Inc. ISBN 978-1-59311-905-8. OCLC 488973218. OL 18800699W.
