= Vital Signs 1 =

1989 studio album by Vital Signs

Studio album by Vital Signs
- Released: March 1, 1989
- Recorded: 1987–1988 at EMI Studios, Karachi, Pakistan
- Genre: Pop, rock
- Length: 64:09
- Label: EMI
- Producer: Rohail Hyatt

Vital Signs chronology
Vital Signs 1 (1989)	Vital Signs 2 (1991)

Vital Signs 1 was the first album of the Pakistani band Vital Signs. Fresh from the success of their smash hit Dil Dil Pakistan Vital Signs went to work on their debut album, with Shoaib Mansoor providing the lyrics to all but 2 songs. Dil Dil Pakistan had unparalleled success, something which no song has ever been able to achieve in Pakistan, on its way to becoming one of the most famous songs ever written.

Rohail Hyatt produced the album, his first shot at music production. He is now known as one of the best Music Producers in Pakistan.

The songs were varied in their arrangements, ranging from rock (Do Pal Ka Jeevan, Chehra) to bubblegum pop (Yaadein). Also included is an Urdu version of Neil Diamond's Red Red Wine with completely unrelated lyrics. Hit songs from the album include Gori and Musafir, which is said to be Junaid Jamshed's best vocal performance ever. The best song on the album is generally thought to be the over 7-minute-long Yeh Shaam, a beautifully written song, featuring a brilliant vocal performance by Junaid Jamshed.

== Track listing ==
All music arranged, composed and produced by Vital Signs. All songs written by Shoaib Mansoor, those which are not are mentioned below.

Vital Signs 1
No.	Title	Writer(s)	Length
1.	"Dil Dil Pakistan"	Nisar Nasik	4:40
2.	"Samjhana"		5:20
3.	"Chehra"	Parveen Shakir	5:47
4.	"Pyar"		6:05
5.	"Tum Mil Gaye"		5:20
6.	"Gori"		4:58
7.	"Samina (Instrumental)"		4:37
8.	"Do Pal Ka Jeevan"		5:37
9.	"Yaadein"		4:02
10.	"Ankhein"		4:19
11.	"Musafir"		5:49
12.	"Ye Shaam"		7:35
Total length:			64:09

== Personnel ==
All information is taken from the CD.

Vital Signs

- Junaid Jamshed Khan - lead vocals
- Rohail Hyatt - keyboards, backing vocals
- Shahzad Hasan - bass guitar
- Salman Ahmad - guitars

Additional musician

- Nusrat Hussain - guitars on "Dil Dil Pakistan"

Production

- Produced by Rohail Hyatt
- Recorded, Mixed & Mastered at EMI Studios in Karachi, Pakistan
- Sound engineering by Iqbal Asif
- Album art by Jaffar Hussain
- Photography by Rooha Gaznavi
