= Pakistani rock =

Genre

Pakistani rock is a variety of rock music that is largely produced in Pakistan. Pakistani rock incorporates elements of both British–American rock and Pakistani classical music.

Since the 1980s, Pakistani rock has had its own distinctive elements, such as a homegrown class of sounds and melodies, spanning progressive rock, hard rock, and heavy metal, initially influencing the development of heavy metal music in the late 1990s. Pakistani rock is almost entirely sung in Urdu, however many bands have issued songs in Punjabi, Pashto, Sindhi and English languages.

== History ==
=== New wave of music (1980–1989) ===
Rock music in Pakistan began in the 1980s with the arrival of cassettes by Western rock music groups such as Pink Floyd, Led Zeppelin, Deep Purple and Van Halen. By 1983-85, local underground rock groups began to perform at five-star hotels and university campuses across the country. The genre began rooted in the ultraconservative regime of President Zia-ul-Haq who had denounced the Western culture and put forwarded the program of Islamized transformation of the country.

In mid-1985, Western-influenced rock music began to be noticed by the public, and underground concerts were held all over the country. The quick success of the music jolted the country in a time when the traditionalist President General Zia-ul-Haq was reigning. President Zia-ul-Haq had strongly denounced "western ideas" such as jeans and rock music. Various groups had garnered the attention of the public, and the genre began to be appreciated as it was out of the ordinary.

These political and economic tensions and pretensions, heavy metal, rock music power plays, and the economic prosperity also propelled the gradual expansion of the country's urban-middle and lower-middle classes. According to the leftist cultural critic Nadeem F. Paracha, "The youth culture at that time emerged from these classes that launched the first shots of the kind of pop culture, scene and music we now call modern Pakistani pop and rock."

In 1986, Benazir Bhutto returned to the country and held a mammoth rally that weakened the conservative President Zia. The country’s major urban music media centres saw a quiet but steady outpouring of brand new rock bands who wanted to sound somewhat different than the time's top pop-rock scions. During the peak and end times of the regime of President Zia-ul-Haq, there was a popular wave of cultural change in the country, and the youth of that time were attracted to many underground rock music bands. In 1986, the Vital Signs,(predominantly a pop band) released their very first solo Do Pal Ka Jeevan, which became an ultimate success and the band built its reputation in Pakistan's underground music industry. The rock music bands and trios came to be perceived by many Pakistani fans and country's cultural observers as a "promising new era of cultural revival". Their enormous popularity significantly opened a new wave of music and a modern chapter in the history of Pakistan.

In the 1980s, rock bands including the Strings, The Barbarians, The Final Cut, Jupiters, Junoon, and Vital Signs gained a lot of public appraisal and popularity. The public opinion was generally positive and welcomed the bands for their uniqueness. NTM, launched a show titled Music Channel Charts to highlight new talent every week due to popular youth demand.

=== Continuing success (1990–present) ===
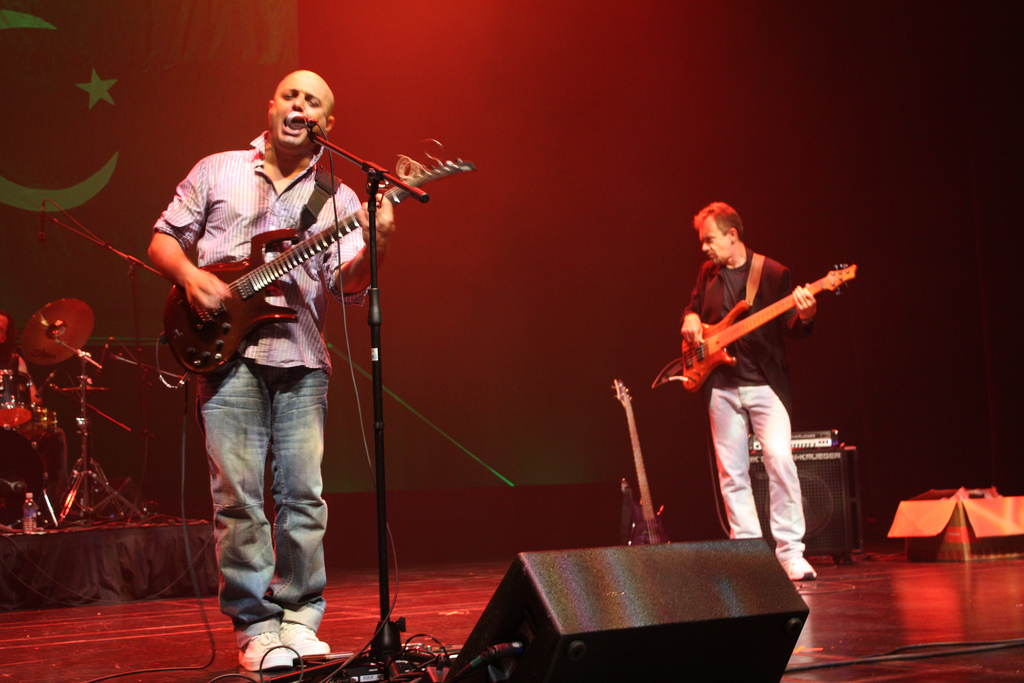
Junoon performing live with the national flag of Pakistan displayed in the background.

Vital Signs were followed by Junoon, Awaz, Strings, Karawan and Jupiters, all of whom had exploded the pop, rock and heavy metal music genre in the country, bringing the significant shift of country's transformation into modernism during the 1990s. The Pakistani rock further matured itself and gained public appraisalwith the arrival of American satellite television in the 1990s. The popular form of music quickly spread throughout the country and with that came the arrival of various rock bands in the 1990s. Early rock bands such as Vital Signs and Junoon are regarded as the pioneers of Pakistan's rock music. Other bands such as Strings began in the mid 1990s and during the late 1990s underground bands were becoming a norm in cities all across Pakistan. In a short span of time, the Western-influenced rock bands gained enormous popularity and were generally welcomed by the public. The Music Channel Charts aired to NTM became the first pop/rock music entity that used to give ratings to pop/rock bands and singers. Music '89 was the first ever all pop/rock music stage-show to be aired on PTV.

Cities such as Karachi, Lahore and Islamabad witnessed an explosion of rock bands and concerts in 2000 as Pakistan began to liberalize under President Musharraf's "enlightened moderation" campaign. In 2002, a major shift in the rock music of Pakistan occurred with the arrival of the Pepsi Battle of the Bands, which saw bands like Aaroh, Mizraab, Entity Paradigm and Mekaal Hasan Band appear onto the scene. Finally Pakistan saw good rock music, with respectable instrument playing. In 2006 Raeth spread waves across the border by their debut song Bhula Doh.

Vital Signs emerged during the times of Pakistan when country was controversially put forwarded towards the Islamization. With the rise of Vital Signs and later, Junoon and others, the rock music, exploded in the 1980s and 1990s, became a vehicle for expressing patriotic nationalist spirit in Pakistan. Undoubtedly, the rock music has been one major influential force which has truly kept the national spirits high amidst the prevailing social woes which had worsened in since the 1980s, such music included songs like "Dil Dil Pakistan", Jazba Junoon, Jaago and many more.

In 1980, such Western ideas were denounced in the country, and the film industry was declining quick to compete with counterrevolution of Indian film industry. According to the editorial written in The Express Tribune in 2011, the "Vital Signs and Pakistan's ingenious rock music was the only "arsenal" the country had against India's encroaching entertainment industry."

== Sufi rock ==
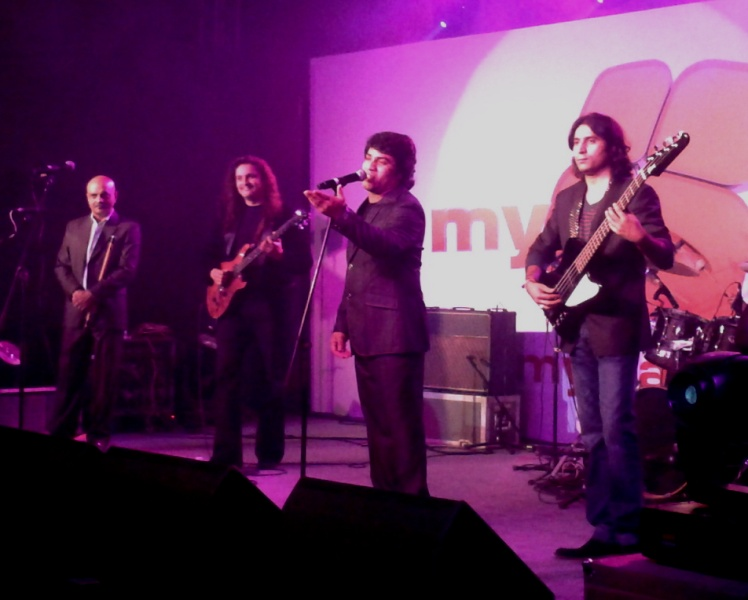
The Sufi rock band, MHB, performing live in January 2012 in Mumbai.

== Contemporary rock ==
Several popular bands, including EP, Call, and Noori, have been integral in revitalizing the rock culture in Pakistan.

== Heavy metal ==
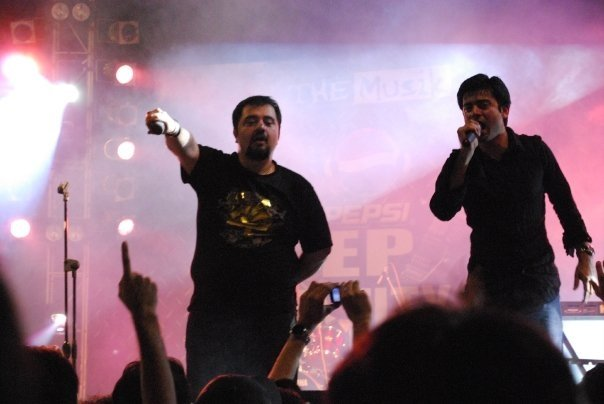
The heavy metal music act, Entity Paradigm, performing, 2009.

After the successful emergence of Vital Signs in the 1980s and Junoon in the 1990s, the heavy metal music genre began to rise after the 1997 general elections. The roots of Pakistani heavy metal music can be traced back to the new wave of British heavy metal when it was transferred in the late 1980s and early 1990s. In the 1980s, the bands Final Cut and Barbarians are considered the earliest Pakistani heavy metal bands. Although they were short-lived, they influenced many other musicians. Guitarist Salman Ahmad gained fame for his unique style of playing Sufi-style and neoclassical musics in heavy metal form.

The second wave of heavy metal artists, including bands such as Dhun, which was Fawad Baloch's more conventional metal project, Black Hour, Ehl-e-Rock, Inferner, and Black Warrant, which still continues to promote the genre. The most notable and productive work on heavy metal genre was bestowed and carried out by Mizraab, whose Panchi album was an ultimate success in this genre. Guitarist Faraz Anwar of Mizraab's solo instrumental work is widely noticed by the public and news channels dubbed Anwar as "Pakistan's master of progressive-metal rock." In recent studies and reports conducted by CNN, heavy metal is one of Pakistan's most popular genres of music, and country's radio FMs broadcast the music each week. Since 2004, the economic liberalization programmes of Prime minister Shaukat Aziz which helped open the new Pakistan TV and several music video channels, have triggered the underground heavy metal movements in cities such as Karachi, Lahore and Islamabad.

Although Mizraab, a band led by Faraz Anwar that is considered to be Pakistan's first progressive metal band, have also played a significant role in promoting the growth of metal music in Pakistan. Furthermore, bands such as Black Hour, Takatak, Messiah and Foreskin are examples of significant metal bands that have surfaced in the past five years.

== Famous bands ==
- Aaroh
- Call
- EP
- Fuzön
- Jal
- Bayaan
- Josh
- Junoon
- Karavan
- The Kominas
- Laal
- Mauj
- Mekaal Hasan Band
- Mizraab
- Noori
- Takatak
- Overload
- Roxen
- Sajid & Zeeshan
- The Sketches
- Strings
- Awaz
- Vital Signs

== See also ==
- 1980 in Pakistan
- Music of Pakistan
- Pakistani hip hop
- Culture of Pakistan
- Rock and Roll
- List of Pakistani music bands
