= Junaid Jamshed =

Pakistani Islamic preacher and singer-songwriter (1964–2016)

Junaid Jamshed SI TI
- جنید جمشید
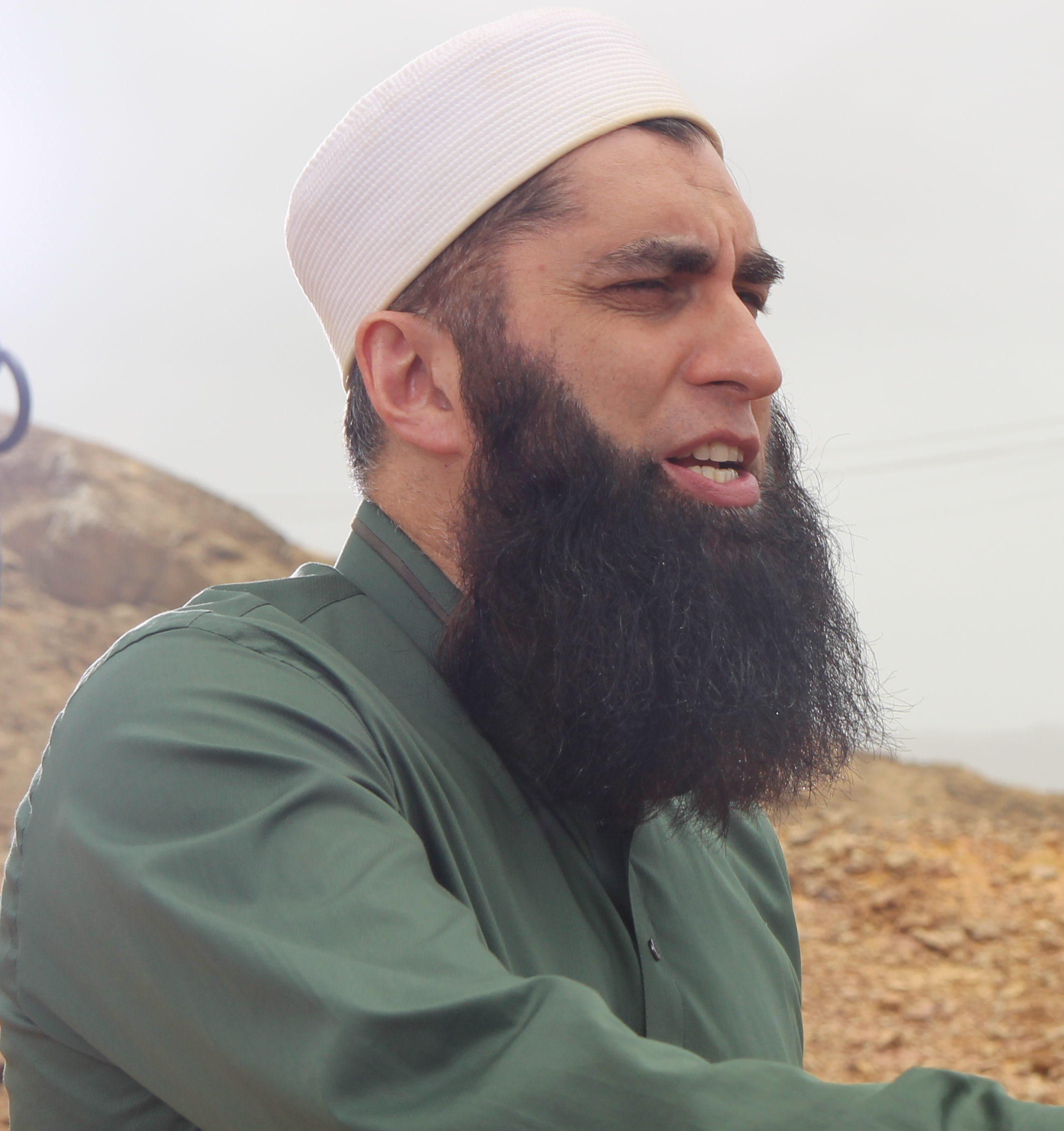
- Born: 3 September 1964; Karachi, West Pakistan, Pakistan
- Died: 7 December 2016 (aged 52); Havelian, Khyber Pakhtunkhwa, Pakistan
- Cause of death: Airplane crash
- Resting place: Jamia Darul Uloom, Karachi
- Occupations: Musician, song writer (1987–2004), Naat khawan (2002–2016), Islamic preacher, brand ambassador
- Years active: 1987–2016
- Height: 1.86 m (6 ft 1 in)
- Relatives: Fauzia Kasuri (aunt); Alyy Khan (cousin); Sirine Jahangir (niece)
- Awards: Sitara-e-Imtiaz (Posthumously) (2018); Tamgha-e-Imtiaz (2007)
- Musical career
- Instruments: Vocals, guitar
- Labels: PTV Studio, EMI Pakistan Studios, Pepsi Pakistan Inc.

Junaid Jamshed Khan (Note: Urdu: جنید جمشید خان) (3 September 1964 – 7 December 2016) was a Pakistani Islamic preacher, singer-songwriter and television personality. Jamshed first gained nationwide and international recognition as the vocalist of Vital Signs. Their 1987 album, Vital Signs 1 included the hit singles "Dil Dil Pakistan", and "Tum Mil Gaye". The commercial success of the album helped develop Pakistan's rock music industry.

In 1994, he released his debut solo album, Junaid of Vital Signs followed by Us Rah Par in 1999 and Dil Ki Baat in 2002. In 2004, Jamshed left both his engineering and music careers and, influenced by the Tablighi Jamaat of Deobandis, focused on his religious activities for Islam, reciting nasheeds on television, and releasing them on CDs. Jamshed also owned a clothing boutique with the name "J." (read as "Jay Dot"), which has several outlets throughout Pakistan and some abroad.

Junaid Jamshed and his wife died on 7 December 2016 when PIA Flight 661 crashed in Havelian; the flight was en route to Islamabad from Chitral. He had been in Chitral for a Tablighi Jamaat mission and was returning to Islamabad.

== Early life and education ==
Junaid Jamshed was born in Karachi to Jamshed Akbar Khan (d. 2016), a group captain in the Pakistan Air Force, and Nafeesa Akbar Khan. His father was from Nowshera while his mother was a granddaughter of the nawab of Loharu State. His maternal uncle Sahibzada Jahangir, nicknamed "Chico", is a businessman based in London who has been one of the founding members of Imran Khan's Pakistan Tehreek-e-Insaf party, and whose son Sherry Jahangir was an actor better known for his role as M.A. Jinnah in PTV classic drama Jinnah Se Quaid, while another son, Kafeel Jahangir, was an England-based domestic cricketer who has played as an all-rounder for Hertfordshire. Other relatives include politician Fauzia Kasuri, who was his aunt, and actor Alyy Khan, his cousin.

After graduating from an international boarding high school in Yanbu' al Bahr in Saudi Arabia, Jamshed wanted to join the Pakistan Air Force as a fighter pilot. However his weak eyesight prevented this. He then entered the University of Engineering and Technology in Lahore, where he took mathematics and physics before declaring his major in mechanical engineering. In 1990, Jamshed gained a Bachelor of Science degree, graduating in mechanical engineering.

After graduating with a degree in engineering from the University of Engineering and Technology in Lahore, Jamshed briefly worked as a civilian contractor and engineer for the Pakistan Air Force before focusing on a musical career.

== Music career ==
=== Vital Signs ===
Although the band Vital Signs began in early 1986 in Rawalpindi by Keyboardist Rohail Hyatt and bassist Shahzad Hasan (Shahi), it was not until later that Jamshed, then a young engineering student from UET Lahore, joined them as their lead singer. They began performing in different parts of the country after having secured a place in the underground music industry in Islamabad and Lahore. In a live concert in Islamabad, the band got noticed and approached by the music officials of the PTV, and a record deal was awarded by Rana Kanwal, a student of the National Academy of Performing Arts. Kanwal was given an assignment in which she wanted to make a music video and she wanted to make one of a music band. The band moved to Islamabad and began working on the first album for Kanwal, then-known as "Chehra" (lit. Face). According to Hyatt, "the song we created for her was Chehra. It was the first song we wrote as an entity and it was also a part of our first album." During this time, the band caught the attention of record producer and broadcaster Shoaib Mansoor who also taught at the National Academy of Performing Arts. Mansoor became acquainted with the band and worked on their first album, spearheading the writing of a patriotic song.

We looked around and then we thought of Junaid, who was in a mediocre band and he was the best part about the band, he was a very good singer and with his good looks and great vocals, was the bona fide front man.

— Shahzad Hassan, Bassist for Vital Signs.

Finally, their first album, Vital Signs 1, was released nationwide and aired on PTV. Their debut hit singles, "Dil Dil Pakistan" and "Tum Mil Gaye", released on 14 August 1987, gave them national fame and prominence. Both songs were big commercial hits and garnered high critical acclaim. The songs in the first album were an instant Sleeper hit and quickly gained a huge nationwide success, which completely shocked the band. In an interview given to PTV, Jamshed said it was not something that would turn him into a professional musician. Jamshed maintained that his plans were to gain a degree in engineering to work for the Pakistan Air Force, initially he didn't want to have anything to do with music other than just treat it as a hobby. In 1990, Jamshed graduated with an engineering degree, and worked in the air force as a civil contractor for a short time before resigning from the air force.

However, Rohail and Shahzad soon managed to convince him otherwise. After a string of chart-topping songs and albums, the band split in 1998 and Jamshed began a solo career, achieving increasing commercial success. Their first album contained many hit songs and the band was approached by several international companies to write songs and advertise their products to the Pakistani public. Their success lifted the underground rock music industry to national level, and they are widely credited for boosting the Pakistani music industry. In 1991, the band released their second album, Vital Signs 2, produced by the EMI Studios in Pakistan. Although, the second album was not as successful as expected, the band made its first international tour in the United States.

In 1993, the band got together with Shoaib Mansoor once again and released their third album, Aitebar. Around the same time, Jamshed signed his first (and only) acting contract for PTV's television miniseries, Dhundle Raste. In early 1995, the band released its fourth and last album, Hum Tum. By early 1996, various issues and difficulties between the members of the band began to surface in the media. After the release of their last single, "Maula", Shahzad Hasan departed to the US after taking up a computer engineering job with IBM. Hyatt formed a recording company; Coke Studio which would later emerge as a successful enterprise.

=== Solo career ===
Jamshed released his first solo album, Junaid of Vital Signs in 1994. The album's name was later changed to Tumhara Aur Mera Naam by the record producers. After departing from Vital Signs in 1998, Jamshed released the second solo album, the Us Rah Par (lit. On that way.) in 1999. The second solo album, Us Rah Par went on to become one of the best selling albums of 1999. The album included several singles which became popular and were ultimate sleeper hits. All songs were written by Jamshed and the majority of such songs as, "Us Rah Par", "Na Tu Ayegi", "Aankhon Ko Aankhon Ney" and "O Sanama", were ultimate success and commercial hits of all time. In 2000, Jamshed released his third album, The Best of Junaid Jamshed, which contained remixes of some of the hit singles of the Vital Signs era, though it captured the mix success. His fourth and last solo album, Dil Ki Baat, was released in 2001, which became highly successful in the country and gained a lot of public and media attention.

In 2003, BBC World Service conducted a poll to choose the most popular songs. Around 7,000 songs were selected from all over the world. According to BBC, people from 155 countries/territories voted in the poll. "Dil Dil Pakistan" was ranked third among the top 10 songs.

==== Drift from music ====
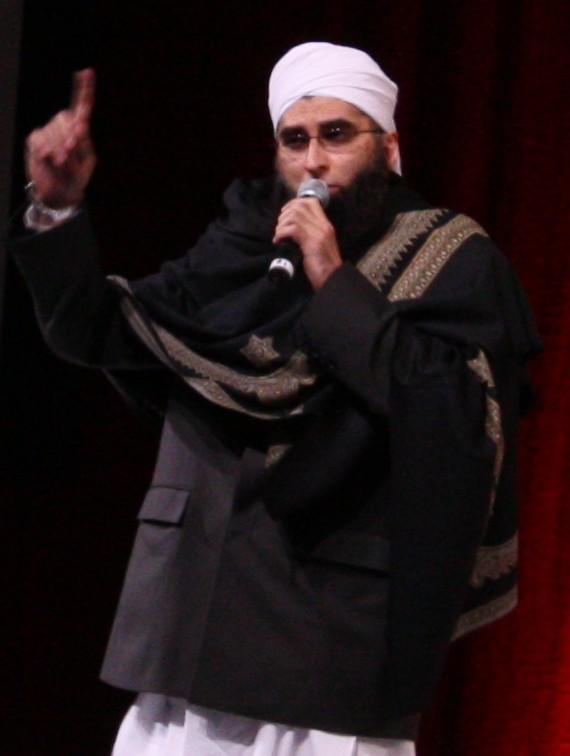
Jamshed at RIS conference held in Toronto in 2009

As early as 1999, the media began speculating about Jamshed's drift from music soon after the Vital Signs faded away. The speculations soon died after Jamshed released his solo albums and continued world tours. After 2001, Jamshed disappeared from the public eye and avoided media attention. His last two albums did not do well in the market and failed to get any positive response from the country's music critics. His former bandmates, Shahzad Hassan and Rohail Hyatt, saw him struggling to negotiate the transition from one world to another. He became distant from Hyatt, who continued to work on producing music. He also struggled financially after leaving the Vital Signs band, and it was Shoaib Mansoor who came to help him financially after giving him the role in Gulls & Guys television show.

After the 9/11 attacks in the United States, Hyatt and Jamshed's tours in the West struggled with a lot of questions from Westerners about the country's culture, terrorism, and music. Upon returning, Jamshed filed for bankruptcy in court and made an attempt to resume his career in engineering after applying at various companies. Theories regarding Jamshed began to arise in media, therefore media outlets hired some paparazzi to follow Jamshed. It was frequently reported that Jamshed had distanced himself from music and had been praying five times a day regularly at the nearby mosque. Finally, Jamshed who had been out of practice from his engineering career for 20 years, announced that he would open a fashion-designing company with a close friend of his. In 2004, Jamshed officially renounced music after announcing that he had devoted his life to Islam. Jamshed then left engineering and, to supplement his income, he opened the clothing store "J.", selling Khaadis (a form of Kurta-Shalwar).

In 2007, in an interview in Chowk Magazine, Mansoor admitted that he was badly affected when Jamshed turned away from music:

One morning I was going through a newspaper when I saw my friend Junaid Jamshed's interview in it. After looking at his new attire in the photograph, published with the article, I could not stop myself from reading it. The more I read the sadder I felt. He had announced that he was quitting music after being convinced that it was 'Haram'. It really shook me badly. I have never believed that God could hate the two most beautiful things he has given to mankind—music and painting. I felt that a confused man like Junaid had no right to confuse thousands of his youthful followers. I had given him sixteen years of my life as a true friend and had played my role in his professional life to the best of my abilities. How could he throw away our sixteen years just like that without even consulting me? I feel that it was my duty to rectify the damage he has done to the already suffering society under the influence of fundamentalists.

— Shoaib Mansoor, 2007,

Mansoor directed and also wrote the script of the successful film Khuda Kay Liye released in 2007. Mansoor said that the film was inspired by Jamshed's life, and offered him a lead role in place of Shaan Shahid. When offered the role, Jamshed maintained that he will "shave his beard" for the film and the role for Jamshed was written by Mansoor. Jamshed later refused to be a part of the film and Mansoor maintained that: "Responses like this one convinced people that Jamshed was not certain about his future, and that the Islamist experience was just a phase."

Nonetheless, Jamshed did sing in some circles, privately, that is. Guitarist, Bilal Maqsood of Strings, held an annual open-mic jam session at his home. At Maqsood's party, one attendee remembered that: "But once he (Junaid) started singing, he just couldn't stop. He was having so much fun singing, he was on a roll." Maqsood maintained that later in the night, he dropped his wife Ayesha home and then came back to sing some more. Jamshed was one of the last people to leave that evening.

In November 2014, Jamshed was accused of blasphemy and in December 2014, in a video message, he apologized for offending people and making mistakes.

== Influence ==
In 1986, Jamshed earned a lot of publicity with the Vital Signs' hit rock song, Do Pal Ka. The Vital Signs band became popular with Pakistan's media after the success of the patriotic Dil Dil Pakistan. He has been listed by The Muslim 500 as one of the "World's Most Influential Muslims" for his involvement in charity work, especially with the NGO Muslim Charity from 2003 until his death in 2016. It stated that "(the) Muslim Charity has achieved a great deal under his leadership and expanded its operations to 16 countries."

== Death ==
Jamshed was in Chitral, along with his second wife, Nayha Junaid, for a Tablighi Jamaat mission. On 7 December 2016, the two were returning to Islamabad aboard PIA Flight 661, which crashed near Havelian, Khyber Pakhtunkhwa, killing all on board. Jamshed was en route to deliver the Friday sermon at the Parliament mosque. He was survived by his first wife, Ayesha, three sons, and a daughter. On 15 December 2016, his funeral prayer offered in Moin Khan Academy, Karachi where Tariq Jamil led his funeral prayer. In 2018, Jamshed was posthumously nominated for the nation's third highest civilian honour, the Sitara-i-Imtiaz.

== Discography ==
=== Vital Signs ===
- 1989: Vital Signs 1
- 1991: Vital Signs 2
- 1993: Aitebar
- 1995: Hum Tum

=== Solo ===
==== Pop albums ====
- 1994 – Junaid of Vital Signs, renamed Tumhara Aur Mera Naam (تمہارا اور میرا نام)
- 1999 – Us Rah Par (اس راہ پر)
- 2000 – The Best of Junaid Jamshed
- 2002 – Dil Ki Baat (دل کی بات)

==== Nasheed albums ====
- 2005 – Jalwa-e-Janan (جلوہ جاناں) (The Sight of the Beloved)
- 2006 – Mehboob-e-Yazdan (The Beloved of God)
- 2007 – Badr-ud-Duja (The Night's Full Moon)
- 2008 – Yad-e-Haram
- 2009 – Rehmat Ul Lil Aalamin
- 2009 – Badi uz Zaman (The Wonder of the Age)
- 2010 – Mera Dil Badal De ([Oh Allah!] change me)
- 2010 – Hadi Ul Anaam (The Guide to the World)
- 2011 – Rabi-Zidn-e-Ilma (O'Lord! Please Increase My Knowledge!)
- 2013 – Noor-Ul-Huda

== Filmography ==
Year	Title	Notes
1989	Dhundle Raste	Telefilm directed by Shoaib Mansoor
2002	Ariel Mothers	Travel show, guest in S1:E97 (Muzaffarabad, AJK)

== Bibliography ==
- Mufti Muḥammad ʻAdnān Mirzā, Junaid Jamshaid: ek ʻahad sāz shak̲h̲ṣiyat (جنيد جمشي: ايک عهد ساز شخصيت), Karāchī: Maktabahtulīmān, 2017, 333 p. Collection of articles on the life of Junaid Jamshed.
