= Hum Tum (album) =

1995 studio album by Vital Signs

Studio album by Vital Signs
- Released: 1 January 1995
- Recorded: 1993–1994 at Master Control Studios in Karachi, Pakistan
- Genre: Pop, Progressive rock
- Length: 46:16
- Label: Oriental Star Agencies,Victory Creations
- Producer: Rohail Hyatt

Vital Signs chronology
Aitebar (1993)	Hum Tum (1995)	Hum Hain Pakistani – Remix (1997)

Alternative cover
- Compact Cassette Cover.

Singles from Hum Tum
- 1. "Hum Tum"; 2. "Un Ka Khayal"; 3. "Yehi Zameen"

Hum Tum (Urdu: ہم تم transl. Me and you) was the fourth studio album of the Pakistani band Vital Signs released in January 1995. This was the last studio album released by the band after which Junaid Jamshed, vocalist of the band, went on to pursue a career as a solo singer, Shehzad Hasan, bassist, concentrated on his work as a music producer and Rohail Hyatt, keyboards, formed a production company.

"Hum Tum" was the highest selling Vital Signs album of all time. The album included famous songs like "Janaan Janaan", acoustic pop song, "Guzray Zamanay Walay" the patent trademark sound of the band and "Dair Ho Gayee" a ghazal like track taken from "Nain Sey Nain". The album saw the progressive evolution in the Vital Signs music away from their first album to a more dark and brooding serious side with tracks like "Main Chup Raha", "Un Ka Khayal" and "Namumkin".

Singles from the album included "Hum Tum", "Un Ka Khayal" and "Yehi Zameen".

The compilation album titled "Hum Hain Pakistani – Mega Remix" released in 1997 was basically a re-release of "Hum Tum" with an addition of two new songs namely, "Khelon Sey Zindagi" and "Hum Hain Pakistani – remixed".

== Track listing ==
All music arranged, composed and produced by Vital Signs. All songs written by Shoaib Mansoor, those which are not are mentioned below.

Hum Tum
No.	Title	Writer(s)	Length
1.	"Jeetain Gay"	Hasan Akbar Kamal, Taher Khan	4:35
2.	"Guzray Zamaney Walay"		3:48
3.	"Janaan Janaan"		4:32
4.	"Hum Tum"		5:14
5.	"Main Chup Raha"		5:16
6.	"Dair Ho Gayee"		4:48
7.	"Un Ka Khayal"		4:42
8.	"Namumkin"		5:50
9.	"Aitebar (Unplugged)"		4:06
10.	"Teray Liye (Unplugged)"		3:25
Total length:			46:16

== Personnel ==
All information is taken from the CD.

Vital Signs

- Junaid Jamshed Khan – lead vocals
- Rohail Hyatt – keyboards, backing vocals
- Shehzad Hasan – bass guitar

Additional musicians

- Asad Ahmed - guitars on all the tracks, except "Teray Liye" (Unplugged) and "Aitebar" (Unplugged) by Aamir Zaki

Production

- Produced & arranged by Rohail Hyatt
- Recorded & Mixed at Master Control Studios in Karachi, Pakistan
- Sound engineering by Rohail Hyatt and Shahzad Hasan
- Photography by Asif Raza
