= The Milestones =

Pakistani band

- Origin: Karachi, Sindh, Pakistan
- Genres: Pop rock
- Years active: 1990–1996
- Labels: Visible Changes, Sound Master
- Members: Ziyyad Gulzar; Ali Tim; Candy Pereira
- Website: www.themilestonesband.com

The Milestones (Urdu: دی مائلسٹونز) were a Pakistani pop rock band that formed in Karachi, Sindh, Pakistan, in 1990. The group was formed by lead guitarist, Ziyyad Gulzar and bassist, Ali Tim, who were soon joined by female lead vocalist, Candy Pereira. The Milestones were one of the pioneer bands of the local pop music scene, quite a few of which even did well at the local music charts. Since its inception, the band only released two studio albums with performing innumerable concerts and gigs, receiving worldwide acclaim.

The band achieved mainstream success with their debut album, Jadoo, released in 1993. The album included famous singles like "Baat", "Jan-e-Jaan", "Jeevan" and "Mein". The success of the band's debut album led them to travel internationally to US, Canada and Cyprus quite a few times, whereas to promote their album they also toured throughout Pakistan. After a gap of eighteen months, the band then recorded and released their second studio album, Volume II. The album included many singles from its predecessor and was not as successful as compared to the band's previous album release. Singles like "Aag" and "Aandhi aur Toofan" from the album did well at the music charts.

After the release of their second studio album, vocalist Candy Pereira and bassist Ali Tim moved to Canada whereas lead guitarist, Ziyyad Gulzar went on forming his own band, Rushk.

== History ==
=== Formation (1990–1992) ===
The band was formed in Karachi, Sindh, in 1990 by lead guitarist, Ziyyad Gulzar along with Carl Miranda on drums and Samar Salim on Keyboards. Ziyyad met bassist Ali Tim, at a gig and was offered to join the band as the band's bassist had left. Ali Tim was awestruck with the set played by Ziyyad and his band. Although, knowing less about playing a bass guitar, Ali Tim affirmed playing with Ziyyad as soon as he was offered to be part of Ziyyad's new project. From then, they were all set to begin their musical career and started to call themselves as "The Milestones".

Three months later, the band, while performing at gig, met a female vocalist, Candy Pereira who was highly inspired by the band performance and thus put forward her wish to be part of the band. She was then auditioned by the two band members, Ali Tim and Ziyyad Gulzar, and after a successful audition Candy was recruited and inducted in the band as the lead vocalist. The trio remained the core members of the band whereas on the other hand the band recruited two sisters, Zoren and Zelena also became a part of the band as backing vocalists for Candy.

After Carl Miranda and Samar Salim left, the band recruited session drummer John Louis Pinto.

Milestones second life was Ziyyad Gulzar on guitars, Ali Tim on Bass and Candy on Vacals as permanent members and rest were session musicians. Milestones produced good music with a few hits out of their 2 albums Jadoo and Milestones 2.

=== Success (1993–1995) ===
In 1993, the band recorded and released their debut album, Jadoo, which was critically acclaimed. The album included famous singles like "Baat", "Jan-e-Jaan", "Jeevan" and "Mein" which achieved the band mainstream success. Soon, the band became one of the top ten mainstream bands in the local music scene as the band had their first commercial success. The success of the band's debut album led them to touring internationally to countries like US, Canada and Cyprus quite a few times, whereas they also performed many concerts throughout the country promoting their album. They toured all over Pakistan to raise funds for Amnesty International, Shaukat Khanum Memorial Cancer Hospital and Pakistan Medical Association whereas they performed frequently for their fans in various metropolitan cities of Pakistan. Also in the same year, the band performed in the biggest concert taking place at the KMC Stadium in Karachi, the concert was headlined by the band and also consisted performances from Vital Signs, Awaz and the newly formed Arsh.

After a gap of 18 months, the band then recorded and released their second studio album, Volume II, in 1994. The album included many singles from its predecessor and was not as successful as compared to the band's previous album release. Singles like "Aag" and "Aandhi aur Toofan" from the album did well at the music charts. The single "Andhi aur Toofan" was released as a tribute to Pakistani cricket team players Waqar Younis and Wasim Akram. The album also included a cover song, "Khayal Rakna" originally performed by the legendary singer, Alamgir.

From 1993 till 1995, the band underwent numerous line up changes at different stages, picking session musicians and permanent back up musicians on keyboards and drums but the trio, Ali, Ziyyad and Candy, remained throughout until their eventual break-up in 1996.

=== Breakup (1996–1997) ===
After the release of their second studio album, the band decided break up when the lead vocalist, Candy Pereira left the band and moved to Canada. Ali Tim and Ziyyad Gulzar started working on a new project and recruited Ali Haider on vocals, forming the band Aakash. Aakash then went on an international tour to England, Canada and the United States and then went on releasing the band's self-titled debut album in 1996 through the record label Sound Master and received a "Platinum Disc Award" for the success of the album. In April, in an interview, Ali Tim mentioned about the Milestones recruiting a new lead vocalist and currently working on releasing the band's third studio album. However, the third studio album wasn't released and Ali Tim moved to Canada whereas lead guitarist, Ziyyad Gulzar went on forming his own band, Rushk.

== Music ==
=== Influence ===
The band was born out of diverse influences like The Beatles, CCR, Pink Floyd, Jimi Hendrix and The Doors releasing 2 albums in a little span of 5 years with innumerable concerts and gigs receiving worldwide acclaim.

=== Live performances ===
The Milestones were a part of a series of concerts & gigs all over the world in the 5 years of them in the industry. Internationally, Milestones toured US, Canada & Cyprus quite a few times, whereas performed in countless concerts in Pakistan. They toured all over Pakistan to raise funds for Amnesty International, Shaukat Khanum Memorial & Pakistan Medical Association whereas they performed frequently for their fans in various metropolitan cities of Pakistan.

The band minus Candy (vocalist) played with Ali Haider in a line up called "Aakash" & toured in the international arenas of UK, US, Canada & Middle East from 1995 to 1997.

== Discography ==
Studio albums

- Jadoo (1993)
- Volume II (1994)

Live albums

- Amnesty International Presents: The Milestones Live in Concert

== Band members ==
Original lineup

- Candy Pereira – lead vocals (1990–1995)
- Ali Tim – bass, lead vocals (1990–1996)
- Ziyyad Gulzar – lead guitars (1990–1996)

Session musicians

- John "Gumby" Louis Pinto – drums (1990–1992)
- Carl Miranda – drums (1992–1993)
- Allan Smith – drums (1993–1995)
- John Saville – keyboards (1992–1993)

Timeline

== See also ==
- List of Pakistani music bands
