= Aitebar =

1993 studio album by Vital Signs

Studio album by Vital Signs
- Released: January 1, 1993
- Recorded: 1992–1993 at Pyramid Studios in Rawalpindi, Pakistan
- Genre: Pop, New Wave, Pop Rock
- Length: 50:20
- Label: EMI
- Producer: Rohail Hyatt

Vital Signs chronology
Vital Signs 2 (1991)	Aitebar (1993)	Hum Tum (1995)

Aitebar was the third album of the Pakistani band Vital Signs.

== Track listing ==
All music arranged, composed and produced by Vital Signs. All songs written by Shoaib Mansoor.

Aitebar
No.	Title	Length
1.	"Woh Kaun Thee"	5:07
2.	"Yarian"	6:09
3.	"Dil Dhoondta Hai"	4:30
4.	"Challa"	4:21
5.	"Chupa Leyna"	4:46
6.	"Aitebar"	4:12
7.	"Khamosh Ho"	5:13
8.	"Har Chehra"	5:13
9.	"Bichar Kay"	5:38
10.	"Yehi Zameen"	5:01
Total length:		50:20

== Personnel ==
All information is taken from the CD.

Vital Signs

- Junaid Jamshed Khan – lead vocals
- Rohail Hyatt – keyboards, backing vocals
- Shehzad Hasan – bass guitar
- Rizwan-ul-Haq – guitars

Additional musician

- Assad Ahmed - guitars

Production

- Produced by Dj khan
- Recorded & Mixed at Pyramid Studios in Rawalpindi, Pakistan
- Sound engineering by Iqbal Asif
- Album art by Creative Unit (Pvt.)Ltd.
- Photography by Rooha Gaznavi
