= Dil Ki Baat (Junaid Jamshed album) =

Studio album by Junaid Jamshed Khan
- Released: 2002
- Recorded: 2001
- Genre: Pop
- Label: Sony BMG

Dil Ki Baat is a music album released by Pakistani pop singer, Junaid Jamshed Khan. It would be the artist's last pop album, before he decided to leave the genre for religious reasons. The song Tum Kehti Ho was later used in serial Zindagi Gulzar Hai on Hum TV.

== Track listing ==
1. "Tum Kehti Ho"
2. "Aankhon Ka"
3. "Aao Aaj Phir"
4. "Aashnaa"
5. "Dil Ki Baat"
6. "Hone Ko Hai"
7. "Intezaar"
8. "Kaho Na"
9. "Sanwala"
10. "Janaa"
11. "Na Tu Aayegee" (UK Version)
12. "Gori Funky Mix" (UK Version)
13. "Yaar"
