= Badr-ud-Duja =

Studio album by Junaid Jamshed
- Released: September 2007
- Studio: Fire Records
- Genre: Islamic
- Label: Geo Music
- Director: Imran Hayat
- Producer: Gohar Hayat

Junaid Jamshed chronology
| Mehboob-e-Yazdaan (2005) | Badr-ud-Duja (2007) | Yaad-e-Haram (2008) |

Badr-ud-Duja (English: The night's full moon) is the third religious and spiritual album released by the Pakistani artist Junaid Jamshed, in Ramadan 2007.

== Trackslisting ==
1. Badr-ud-Duja
2. Tala Al Badru Alyna
3. Bold and Brave
4. Dua-e-Taariq -
5. Habibi Rasooli
6. Habibi Rasooli
7. Hijarat
8. Kamli Wale
9. Mere Allah, Tu kareem Hai
10. Nasab Mubarak
11. O Mericiful
12. Recitation
