= In the Name of God (2007 film) =

- Theatrical poster
- Directed by: Shoaib Mansoor
- Written by: Shoaib Mansoor
- Produced by: Athar Abbas; Syed Mujtaba Tirmizi
- Starring: Shaan Shahid; Iman Ali; Rasheed Naz; Naseeruddin Shah; Fawad Khan; Naeem Tahir; Hameed Sheikh
- Cinematography: David Lemay; Ali Mohammad; Neil Lisk; Ken Seng
- Edited by: Ali Javed; Aamir Khan; ET
- Music by: Rohail Hyatt
- Production company: Shoman Productions
- Distributed by: Geo Films; Percept Picture Company; Sony Films
- Release date: 20 July 2007 (Pakistan)
- Running time: 171 minutes
- Country: Pakistan
- Languages: English; Urdu
- Budget: Rs. 6 crore (US$210,000)
- Box office: Rs. 15.06 crore (US$540,000)

In the Name of God (Urdu: خدا کے لیے, Khuda Kay Liye) is a 2007 Pakistani drama film directed by Shoaib Mansoor, produced by Brigadier Syed Mujtaba Tirmizi from ISPR and stars Shaan Shahid, Fawad Khan and Iman Ali in pivotal roles, with a cameo appearance by Naseeruddin Shah. The film follows Mansoor and Sarmad (played by Shaan and Khan), two singers whose lives changed after the 9/11 attacks in America and the misinterpretation of Jihad.

It was released on 20 July 2007 in Pakistan and on 4 April 2008 in India, as well as screenings at various international film festivals. The film subsequently won several awards for its acting, notably three Lux Style Awards and one Silver Pyramid Award at Cairo International Film Festival. The release of the film was historic for two reasons: due to distribution by Shailendra Singh and Percept Pictures, it was the first Pakistani film to be released in India in almost half a century, and secondly, it was the first ever Pakistani film included in the official selection of the International Film Festival of India (IFFI).

== Plot ==
Brothers Mansoor and Sarmad are two successful singers from Lahore. Sarmad eventually comes under the influence of the Islamic activist Maulana Tahiri and begins to adopt a more conservative Islamic way of living, giving up his music career because it is considered "haram" by the activist. In London, Maryam (Mary), a Westernised British Pakistani girl, falls in love with Dave, a member of the British community. However, this displeases her hypocritical father, despite his own live-in relationship with a British woman.

Meanwhile, Mary's father plans to take her to Pakistan to meet Sarmad and Mansoor. During the visit, she is deceived by her father and taken across the border to Afghanistan under the pretence of attending a relative's wedding. In Afghanistan, she is forcibly married to her cousin Sarmad and abandoned in their household. In an attempt to escape, Mary tries to flee the village but is caught by Sarmad. He eventually rapes her, following the maulana's advice, as a form of punishment intended to prevent her from escaping again. As a result, Mary becomes pregnant and gives birth to Sarmad's child, further reducing her chances of escape.

At the same time, Mansoor attends a music school in Chicago, where he meets a fellow music student, Janie. They fall in love, and Janie gives up drinking alcohol for him. They eventually marry. However, shortly after the 9/11 attacks, Mansoor is arrested by the FBI because of his Islamic background and is detained and tortured for a year in Guantanamo Bay detention camp.

Sarmad's father rescues Mary with the protection of the British government. A devastated Mary takes her father and husband to court in Pakistan in search of justice. Wali (Naseeruddin Shah), a Maulana, then explains to the court how Islam is being misused in the name of war and hatred, presenting the religion in a peaceful and credible manner. Traumatised by all the suffering he has witnessed and caused, Sarmad withdraws the case. He also realises the harm he inflicted in the name of religion. Mary is freed and returns to the village where she had been held captive in order to educate the girls there.

Meanwhile, after a year of torment, Mansoor remains in FBI custody; the final torture session leaves him with permanent brain damage. Following an unsuccessful rehabilitation attempt, he is deported and reunited with his family in Pakistan, where he begins to recover.

== Cast ==
- Shaan as Mansoor
- Fawad Khan as Sarmad
- Iman Ali as Maryam (Mary)
- Naseeruddin Shah as Maulana Wali (Special Appearance)
- Naeem Tahir as Mansoor's & Sarmad's Father
- Rasheed Naz as Maulana Tahirih
- Hameed Sheikh as Sher Shah
- Sonia Rehman as Khala
- Humayun Kazmi as Mary's Father
- Austin Marie Sayre as Janie
- Najiba Faiz as Gul Bano
- Seemi Raheel as Mansoor's & Sarmad's Mother

== Production ==
=== Development ===
The way America and the West are dealing with the problem is very wrong — they are just trying to kill and suppress those Muslims who are being labeled as terrorists. And it will not solve the problem because if you kill 10, a hundred more will emerge.

— Shoaib Mansoor during an interview for the film.

Shoaib Mansoor, the film's director, developed the idea after the misconceptions about Pakistan in the Pakistani diaspora and India. Mansoor stated that the film would clear the irrelevant thinking of Indians towards the Pakistani community.

=== Filming ===
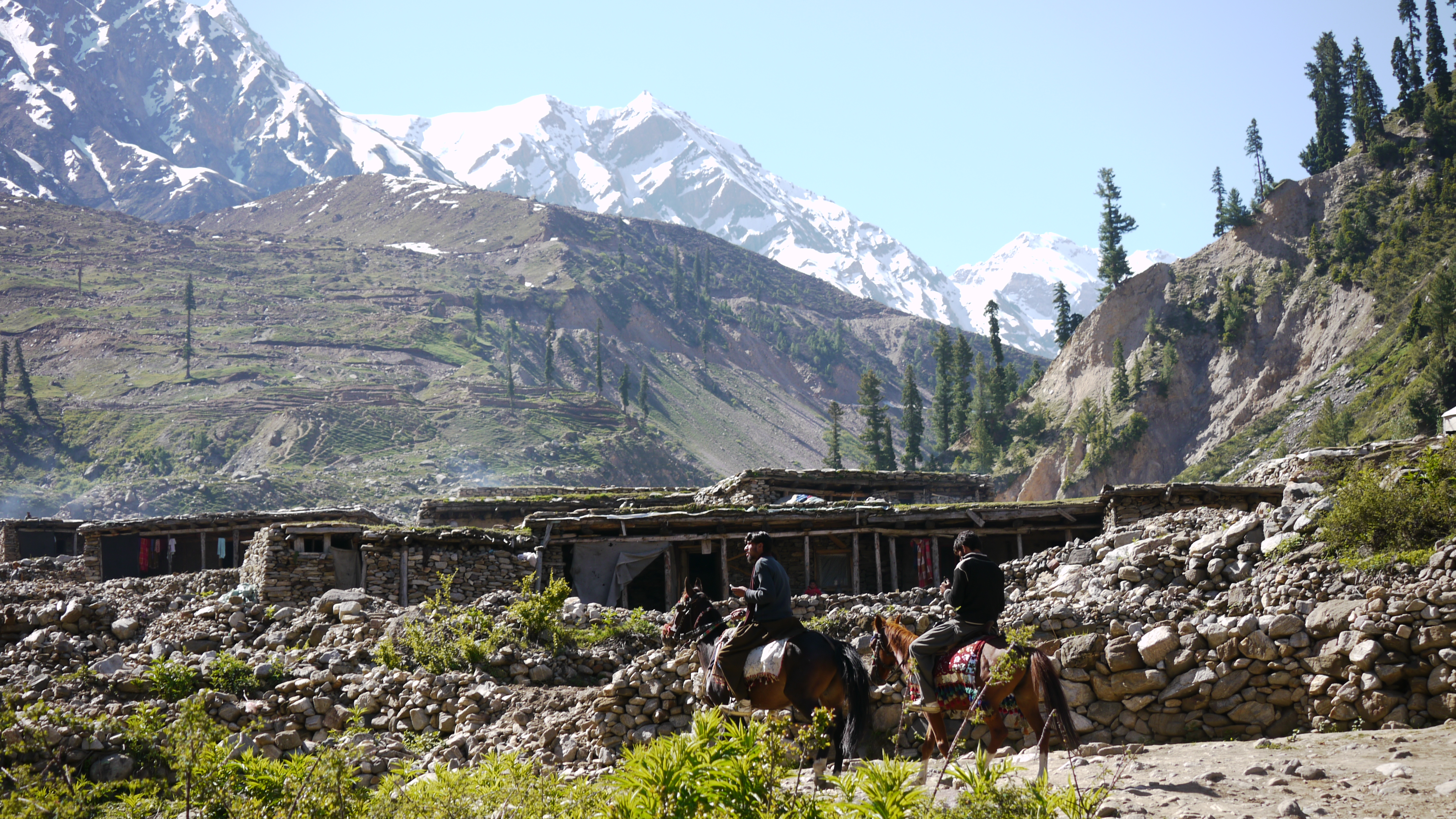
Federally Administered Tribal Area of Pakistan, where much of the film was shot

Principal photography of the film took place in Lahore, where most of the parts were filmed. Besides, the film was also shot at Chicago, London and Khyber Pakhtunkhwa.

== Box office ==
In the Name of God is one of Pakistan's highest-grossing films, with a domestic gross of PKR 11.1 million and a worldwide gross of PKR 210 million.

== Music ==
Khuda Kay Liye

Soundtrack album by Various artists
- Released: 7 July 2007
- Recorded: 2006–2007
- Genre: Film soundtrack
- Labels: Republic Music Group, Huqa Entertainment Corp, Sony BMG
- Producer: Rohail Hyatt

The music of the film was released on 7 July 2007. The soundtrack album of the film was composed and produced by Rohail Hyatt. All songs were written by Shoaib Mansoor with an exception of "Mahi Way" and "Bandeya".

No.	Title	Writer(s)	Artist	Length
1.	"Duniya Ho"	Shoaib Mansoor	Ahmed Jahanzeb, Shuja Haider	3:57
2.	"Hamaray Hain"	Shoaib Mansoor	Ahmed Jahanzeb, Shuja Haider	3:49
3.	"Bandeya Ho"	Bulleh Shah	Khawar Jawad, Faiza Mujahid	3:38
4.	"Tiluk Kamod"		Ahmed Jahanzeb	4:37
5.	"Janie Janie"	Shoaib Mansoor	Ahmed Jahanzeb, Lagan the Band	6:01
6.	"Allah Hoo"		Saeen Zahoor, Zara Madani
7.	"Mahi Way"	Faiza Mujahid	Khawar Jawad, Faiza Mujahid	3:10
8.	"Khuda Ke Liye"	Shoaib Mansoor	Ammar Hassan	3:33
9.	"Bandeya Ho (DJ Suketu and DJ Aks Remix)"	Bulleh Shah	Khawar Jawad, Faiza Mujahid	3:34

== Accolades ==
Ceremony	Category	Recipient	Result	Ref.
7th Lux Style Awards	Best Film	Shoaib Mansoor	Won	
7th Lux Style Awards	Best Film Actor	Shaan Shahid	Won	
7th Lux Style Awards	Best Film Actress	Iman Ali	Won	
7th Lux Style Awards	Best Original Soundtrack	Rohail Hayat	Won	
Cairo International Film Festival	Silver Pyramid Award for Best Artistic Contribution	Khuda Kay Liye	Won	
Roberto Rossellini Award (Italy)	Best Film	Khuda Kay Liye	Won	
Fukuoka International Film Festival	Fukuoka Audience Award	Khuda Kay Liye	Won	
Muscat Film Festival	Best Foreign Film	Khuda Kay Liye	Won	

== See also ==
- List of highest-grossing Pakistani films
- List of Pakistani films of 2007
- List of cultural references to the September 11 attacks
