= Salman Ahmed =

American policy advisor

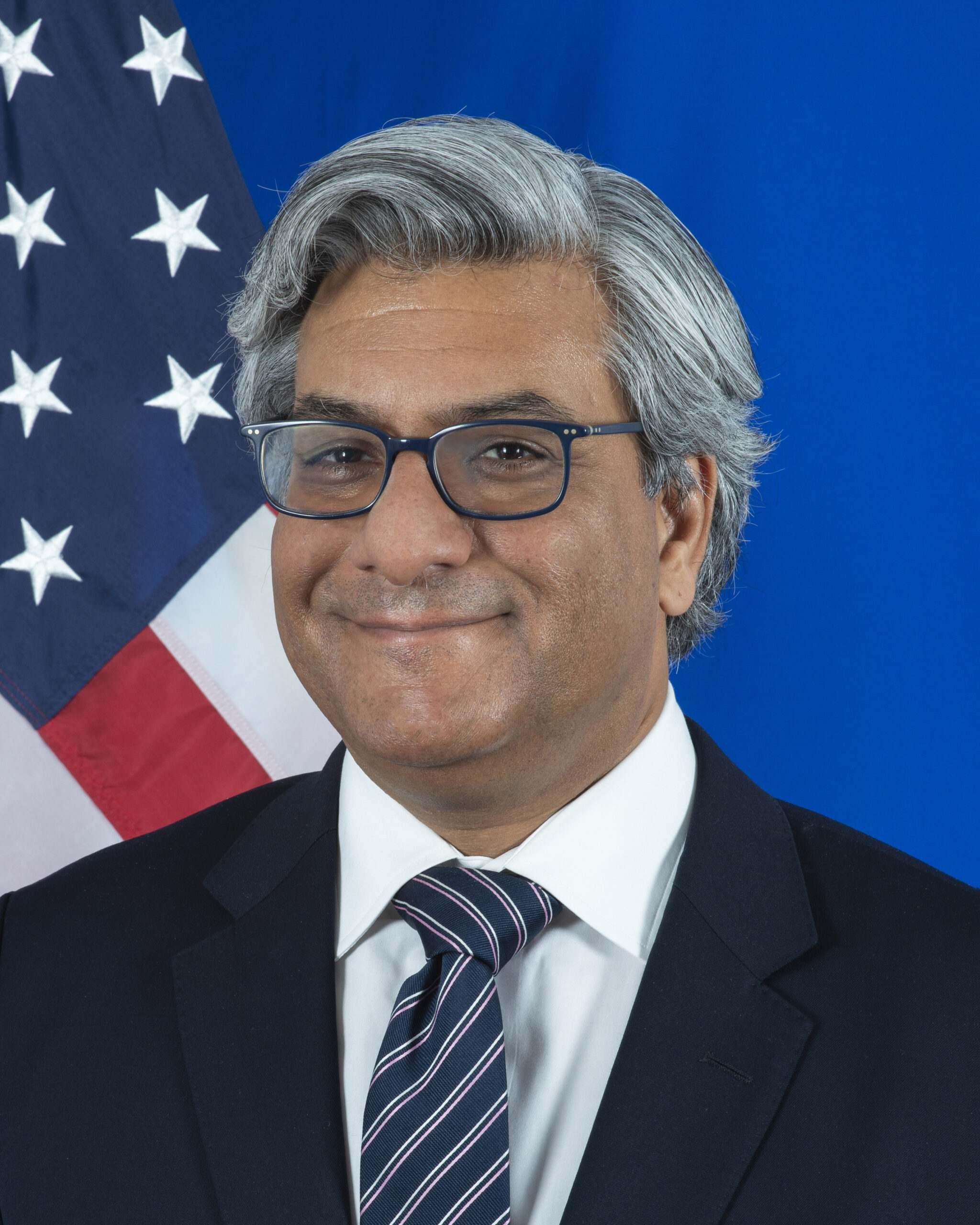
- Ahmed in 2021

32nd Director of Policy Planning
- In office January 20, 2021 – January 20, 2025
- President: Joe Biden
- Preceded by: Peter Berkowitz
- Succeeded by: Michael Anton

Personal details
- Party: Democratic
- Education: New York University (BS); University of Cambridge (MPhil)

Salman Ahmed is an American national security and foreign policy advisor who served as the director of policy planning in the Biden administration from 2021 to 2025.

== Education ==
Ahmed earned a Bachelor of Science in economics from New York University's Stern School of Business and a Master of Philosophy in international relations from the University of Cambridge.

== Career ==
Ahmed worked for the United Nations as chief of staff for the Head of UN Peacekeeping Operations and secretary of the Panel on UN Peace Operations (see Brahimi Report). He was one of the drafters of the UN Secretary General's Report on the Fall of Srebrenica. Ahmed also participated in and planned UN field missions in Iraq (2003, 2004), Afghanistan (2001–2002), Bosnia and Herzegovina (1996–1998), South Africa (1994), and Cambodia (1992–1993).

Ahmed worked for the Obama administration for eight years. He joined the Department of State in 2009 and served as a chief of staff of the United States Mission to the United Nations, continuing after July 2013 as a special assistant to the President and senior director of strategic planning for the United States National Security Council. He had been a fellow at the Carnegie Endowment for International Peace, where he specialized in foreign policy and research and also taught at Princeton University's Woodrow Wilson School of Public and International Affairs.

During the Taliban takeover of Kabul, Ahmed was dispatched to Doha to assist Special Representative Zalmay Khalilzad in negotiations with Taliban representatives.
