= Aamir Zaki =

Pakistani musician

- Born: Aamir Zaki; 8 April 1968; Riyadh, Saudi Arabia
- Origin: Pakistan
- Died: 2 June 2017 (aged 49) Karachi, Pakistan
- Genres: Blues, Jazz, Classical, Psychedelic rock, Blues rock, Hard rock, Acid rock, Heavy metal, Eastern classical, Pop music
- Occupations: Guitarist, Singer, Songwriter, Composer, Luthier
- Instrument: Gibson Flying V (self-made)
- Years active: 1985–2017
- Label: Sonic
- Formerly of: Vital Signs Band; Alamgir's Music Group

Aamir Zaki (8 April 1968 – 2 June 2017) was a Pakistani guitarist-songwriter and composer. Zaki is widely considered by many as one of the most influential guitarists in Pakistan's history, and among the pioneers of rock music in Pakistan.

== Early life and career ==
Aamir Zaki was born on 8 April 1968 in Riyadh, Saudi Arabia. Zaki started out his music career with a band named 'The Scratch' in 1987. Their first album was entitled The Bomb, with the title track being about the Empress Market bomb blast. He later quit 'The Scratch' in 1988 to form his own band. He was known to make his own guitars all through his career as a musician.

=== On Tour with Alamgir ===
The first mainstream musician to recognize Zaki as a teenage prodigy was Alamgir, who got in touch with him to tour India, Dubai, England and the United States. After touring, Zaki played on two of Alamgir's albums. "Keh De Na" and "Albela Rahi" were two singles with Zaki as the lead guitarist.

=== Post-Alamgir ===
After parting with Alamgir, Aamir Zaki formed the rock band Axe Attack. Axe Attack's debut album was rejected by Pakistani record labels, causing the group to fall out. Some years later, the rhythm guitarist Nadeem Ishtiaq took the album to Australia where the songs made it to the radio and were well received.

=== Vital Signs ===
In 1994, Zaki joined Vital Signs who at that time were already country's largest pop act. Vital Signs had expelled their second guitarist Rizwan-ul-Haq, and Zaki joined in his place. Zaki performed extensively with Vital Signs before quitting the band due to not getting a fair split in royalties. Zaki later toured with former bandmates Junaid Jamshed and Shahzad Hassan after Hyatt's exit from the band.

=== Solo career ===
After leaving Vital Signs, Zaki released Signature in 1995, an independent release, with his own money. The first batch of CDs was made in England, and Sonic released the album in Pakistan. The album was a hit, and one song "Mera Pyar" (Urdu for My Love) was a major hit. This track was also written and released in English, titled as "Do You Really Love Another", on the same album. When asked about inspiration for the song, Zaki responded by saying, "someone who doesn't exist and never will.", referencing to his ex-wife. Zaki was awarded with the Gold Disc for his debut album from Soundcraft UK. Zaki further released two more albums Rough Cut (2007) with Hadiqa Kiani on vocals and Radio Star (2007).

In the late 1990s, Zaki started to perform live songs of his original English and Urdu tracks. He also started doings gigs at Karajazz Festival and Cafe Blue (Karachi, Pakistan).

Zaki further collaborated with many artists on various tracks including collaborations with Hadiqa Kiani for her song "Is Baar Milo" and with Maha Ali Kazmi for song "Aaj Sun Ke Tumara Naam" which was released on his one-month death anniversary.

Aamir Zaki was not a fan of consumerism. He was not glamorous and he pandered to no one.

=== Coke Studio ===
Zaki appeared as a guest musician on Coke Studio Pakistan (season 7) in 2014. He was featured on four songs by Zoheb Hassan, "Chehra", "Dheeray Dheeray" "Jaana", and "Sab Aakho Ali Ali". Later he was featured in Coke Studio Pakistan (season 10) in "Naina Moray", a song by Javed Bashir and Akbar Ali, where he received appreciation for his bluesy guitar solo. This was to be his last public performance in 2017.

Aamir Zaki also taught guitar playing at National Academy of Performing Arts (NAPA) in Karachi and inspired many Pakistani youngsters into picking up the guitar.

== Personal life ==
Zaki married at the age of 22 and divorced at the age of 24. The song "Mera Pyar" from his album Signature was for his ex-wife. Following which, Zaki had prolonged illness and severe depression, he became self-destructive over time and even started to burn some of his guitars. He was a vulnerable, emotionally troubled man.

== Death ==
Zaki died on 2 June 2017, at the age of 49, after suffering from a heart attack.

According to a major newspaper of Pakistan:

"He was also a thinking artist, a musician ahead of his time; it can be felt when listening to his work".

== Discography ==
=== Solo career ===
- Signature (1995) - includes the popular song, 'Mera Pyaar',
- Rough Cut (2007) with Hadiqa Kiani.
- Radio Star (2007)

=== Vital Signs ===
- Hum Tum
