= Vital Signs 2 =

1991 studio album by Vital Signs

Studio album by Vital Signs
- Released: March 1, 1991
- Recorded: 1989–1990 at EMI Studios in Karachi, Pakistan
- Genre: Pop
- Length: 58:13
- Label: EMI; Tips Music
- Producer: Rohail Hyatt

Vital Signs chronology
| Vital Signs 1 (1989) | Vital Signs 2 (1991) | Aitebar (1993) |

Vital Signs 2 was the second album of the Pakistani band Vital Signs released in 1991.

== Track listing ==
All music composed by Vital Signs. All songs written by Shoaib Mansoor.

Vital Signs 2
| No. | Title | Length |
|---|---|---|
| 1. | "Sanwali Saloni" | 4:55 |
| 2. | "Mera Dil" | 3:54 |
| 3. | "Ajnabi" | 5:06 |
| 4. | "Tere Liye" | 4:15 |
| 5. | "Naraaz" | 3:46 |
| 6. | "Hum Rahe Rahee" | 7:04 |
| 7. | "Pass Rehna" | 5:12 |
| 8. | "Nazar" | 4:24 |
| 9. | "Yaad Karna" | 5:04 |
| 10. | "Aisay Hum Jiyain (Air Force)" | 4:33 |
| 11. | "Bazaar" | 4:45 |
| 12. | "Aisa Na Ho Yeh Din" | 5:15 |
| Total length: | | 58:13 |

== Personnel ==
All information is taken from the CD.

Vital Signs

- Junaid Jamshed Khan - lead vocals
- Rohail Hyatt - keyboards, backing vocals
- Shehzad Hasan - bass guitar
- Rizwan-ul-Haq - guitars

Production

- Produced by Rohail Hyatt
- Recorded, Mixed & Mastered at EMI Studios in Karachi, Pakistan
