= Dil Dil Pakistan =

Single by Vital Signs
- Released: August 1985
- Genre: Pop/Patriotic
- Length: 4:28
- Songwriters: Nisar Nasik, Shoaib Mansoor
- Producer: Shoaib Mansoor

Vital Signs singles chronology
"Samjhana (Instrumental)"	"Dil Dil Pakistan"	"Samjhana"
External videos
- Dil Dil Pakistan on YouTube

Dil Dil Pakistan (Urdu: دل دل پاکستان ) is a patriotic Pakistani pop song by Vital Signs, sung by Junaid Jamshed. Produced and directed by Shoaib Mansoor, with lyrics by Mansoor and Nisar Nasik, it was first released as a single in August 1985 and later appeared on the band's debut album Vital Signs 1 (1989). It became one of Pakistan's most celebrated pop anthems, often referred to as the country's "second national anthem."

== Composition ==
The song was conceived under the creative direction of Shoaib Mansoor, who mentored the newly formed Vital Signs in the mid-1980s. Mansoor wrote the lyrics with poet Nisar Nasik, while Rohail Hyatt arranged the music. The track’s upbeat tempo and melodic synth-pop sound reflected Western pop influences but carried distinctly Pakistani patriotic sentiment.

Although recorded in 1985, the song's television debut on PTV gave Vital Signs national fame. Its inclusion in Vital Signs 1 (1989) cemented the group's place in Pakistani pop history.

== Reception and legacy ==
"Dil Dil Pakistan" received widespread acclaim upon release and quickly became an emblem of youthful patriotism during a politically restrictive period in Pakistan. It was regularly broadcast on PTV and performed during national celebrations, and has been hailed as an unofficial national anthem of Pakistan.

In 2003, a global BBC World Service poll ranked it third among the world’s most popular songs. Critics credit the song for sparking Pakistan's modern pop music movement, inspiring subsequent acts such as Junoon and Strings.

The track remains integral to Pakistani cultural identity, frequently played on Pakistan Day and Independence Day. It has been covered and remixed by numerous artists, including a 2017 re-recording by Mohsin Khan and "Nite People" and a tribute version by Junaid Jamshed's sons in 2020. In "a straight lift", the 1990 Indian film Yaadon Ke Mausam copied the melody and part of the Pakistani song's lyrics in the song "Dil Dil Hindustan", without seeking permission or giving credit for the rip-off.

== Music video ==
The official music video was filmed in Islamabad, featuring scenic locations such as Shakarparian, the Islamabad Golf Club, and Constitution Avenue. It depicted the band performing outdoors, driving a Jeep through hilly areas, and performing before a green backdrop. The visual of "I Love Pakistan" painted on a rock became an enduring image of the era. Toward the end of the video, the band plays in a small studio with a simple green backdrop and bright lights. The song has synthesizers, keyboards, major chord progression, and a catchy chorus hook.

== Personnel ==
- Junaid Jamshed – vocals
- Shehzad Hassan – Bass
- Rohail Hyatt – Keyboard
- Nusrat Hussain – Guitars
