= Rohail Hyatt =

Pakistani record producer and composer

Rohail Hyatt HI
- روحیل حیات
- Born: Rohail Hyatt; 4 December 1964 (age 61); Rawalpindi, Punjab, Pakistan
- Occupations: Music director; music producer; composer
- Years active: 1983–present
- Notable work: Coke Studio, Vital Signs, Re-recording of National Anthem of Pakistan.
- Spouse(s): Umber Hyatt (?–2012); Alina Hyatt (m. 2021)
- Musical career
- Genres: World Fusion; world music
- Instruments: Keyboards; Synthesizer; Guitar
- Labels: Frequency Media; Pyramid Productions; EMI Pakistan; Sony Music India; Saregama; Oriental Star Agencies; His Master's Voice; Sony BMG; Fire Records

Rohail Hyatt HI (Urdu: روحیل حیات) is a Pakistani record producer, keyboardist, and composer. As a record producer, Hyatt is largely credited with pioneering Pakistani pop rock music by incorporating western rock and pop influences.

In 1986, Hyatt founded the band Vital Signs and released its commercially successful and critically acclaimed album, Vital Signs 1. The first album included the international number-one single "Dil Dil Pakistan" as well as "Tum Mil Gaye", which were both composed by Hyatt. The big commercial success of Vital Signs' first album helped shape the rock music industry of Pakistan. In 1991, Hyatt produced and released the band's second album, Vital Signs 2, distributed by EMI Pakistan, which received mixed reviews. Between 1993 and 1995, Hyatt garnered recognition and critical acclaim for composing the two albums which improved the recognition of his work in the music industry.

In 1998, Hyatt discontinued Vital Signs after facing various issues, parting with fellow band member Junaid Jamshed to focus on his solo career. Hyatt later founded Pyramid Productions which subsequently emerged as one of the most prominent music production companies of Pakistan, and produced a ghazal album featuring Rahat Fateh Ali Khan. In 2007, he composed the soundtrack of the critically acclaimed and internationally successful film, Khuda Kay Liye, which helped promote his work within the country and internationally. In 2008, Hyatt founded the international music outlet, Coke Studio, and he is credited with featuring both established and upcoming Pakistani artists through the platform.

== Early life and education ==
Hyatt grew up in Rawalpindi in the Punjab province of Pakistan in the Khattar family of Sir Liaqat Hayat Khan, a prominent Punjabi leader during British rule of whom Hyatt is a great-grandson. He studied at St. Mary's Academy before embarking on his career in music. Hyatt recalls that his interest in music grew in his early childhood and his parents encouraged his interest in Western music. He grew up in the midst of "a serious hippie community." His parents' music was dominated by Nat King Cole and Engelbert Humperdinck, but after his parents bought him his first keyboard, he began composing traditional Pakistani and Sufi music. His mother had a great impact on him and his interest in music, as she arranged music lessons for him to learn keyboard. Hyatt recalls that his mother had him go to sleep in the afternoons by putting the radio on, with much of the music being local pop. However, his interest in producing and playing Western music began after his aunt bought Pink Floyd's The Wall album in 1980, which he frequently listened to. Regarding Pink Floyd, Hyatt stated: "That just did it for me. It opened up a whole new direction of soundscapes and influences."

During his youth, he was a member of the Pakistan national under-19 cricket team and it seemed that his future was in the sport until he met Rizwan-ul-Haq. The two became acquaintances and Hyatt discovered that Haq was also a guitarist after Haq played guitar at school. At Peshawar University, he met with guitarist Shahzad Hasan (Shahi) and decided to form a band, although no name for the new band was reached. In the 1980s, he was a member of two underground bands – Progressions and Crude X. Bassist Nusrat Hussain, whom he cites as a major influence in learning and on his outlook on music along with the global acts of that era, was a member of Progressions, while Shahi was in Crude X. Hyatt later left the university and referred himself as "a bum," while enrolled. Hyatt was later employed at the British embassy where he worked in a desk job. He later left this job to pursue keyboard and guitar.

His son, Danial Hyatt, is also a musician. He participated with his band Mole in the third episode of Coke Studio season four with the instrumental "Baageshri", while later composing the background score of the 2019 action-thriller movie Laal Kabootar.

== Career ==
=== Vital Signs ===
In the midst of 1980s, Hyatt partnered with Shahzad Hasan (Shahi) to begin working on the rock/pop music genre; both launched Vital Signs in 1986. Earlier in 1983, Hyatt met Junaid Jamshed who sang "Careless Whisper", a 1984 single by George Michael, at the Islamabad Model College. During this time, Hyatt was looking for a singer for his new band and he had earlier wanted to work with Jamshed, but due to various reasons, could not arrange a meeting with him. That night at the university campus, Jamshed sang "Careless Whisper" and impressed Hyatt to become band's new lead singer. With the help of Hyatt and Nusrat Hussain, Jamshed was inducted into Vital Signs and signed a record deal with record executive and producer Shoaib Mansoor to his PTV Music Studio.

For most of the decade, Hyatt was the leader of Vital Signs. Hyatt led the Signs on the internal creative core and the entire financial management of the Signs. Together, Vital Signs produced five albums and were under contract with Pepsi Cola from 1991 to 1997. Rohail played the role of band member, producer, songwriter, guitarist, and keyboardist at different times in the band's history. The first hit for Vital Signs was "Dil Dil Pakistan", which was voted the third most popular song in the world by a poll carried out by BBC World.

=== Founder Coke Studio ===
Hyatt launched the music platform Coke Studio Pakistan in 2008, produced by The Coca-Cola Company. Hyatt has shared that his vision for the TV show was to experiment with fusion music and bring to the forefront the extensive depth and breadth of Pakistan's traditional music by incorporating it into an electronic landscape, stating that "the idea was to share our traditional music with the world, but in a palatable sound scale." Hyatt felt strongly that the show should "promote Pakistan's folk, classical and indigenous music by marrying it to more popular or mainstream music." Hyatt's plans for the show were met with some skepticism initially, and he was allowed to produce only three or four songs for the first season of Coke Studio Pakistan. However, their instant popularity allowed him to experiment more decisively in subsequent seasons.

Hyatt produced Seasons 1-6 of Coke Studio Pakistan as well as Seasons 12 and 13. Discussing his musical philosophy and creative approach to Coke Studio, Hyatt has stated that he aimed to make Coke Studio as inclusive and accommodating as possible for artists and musicians, asserting that "everybody is welcomed with equal warmth and there is no division of spotlight. And this is by design, at least anything I am a part of will be neutral, it has to be a win-win for everyone." He further elaborated that "it isn't just about being a part of the show, it is much bigger than that. It is about giving the musicians the respect and recognition they deserve as people with amazing talent and skillset."

Post 9/11, I did wake up and I wanted to discover who we really are and which part of the world we are in and what our history might be. That for me was an awakening. That we are Hindus, we are Aryan, and [now] we are Muslims and god-knows what else. We are a melting pot of all these people and these cultures and they've brought their art forms over the years, their instruments and their ways and their philosophies. So that was liberating, and of course that led to a process of self-discovery....

— Rohail Hyatt, views on the culture of Pakistan

As producer, Hyatt is said to have brought a psychedelic vibe to the show and has been praised for infusing energy and creativity into Coke Studio's production. Through his work in Coke Studio, Hyatt is credited with shaping musical trends in the South Asian soundscape, being instrumental in reinventing traditional sounds, and redefining music production in Pakistan. Hyatt is also acknowledged for facilitating "creative collaborations between two different dimensions of music, the established contemporary Western artists alongside regional, folk, classical ones..." as well as for scouting and promoting new talent through the show. Writing for The News on Sunday, Maheen Sabeeh contended that "under Rohail Hyatt’s days as producer, Coke Studio became something of a phenomenon, both in Pakistan and outside that was both cool enough for the youth and appealed to an older generation as well."

Hyatt is currently Coca-Cola's music consultant helping other markets to launch the Coke Studio franchise.

=== Re-recording of the Pakistan National Anthem ===
Mandated by the Government of Pakistan in April 2022, a steering committee was established to create a re-recording of the original national anthem of Pakistan to mark the 75th anniversary of the independence of Pakistan. The new recording was aimed at reflecting the inclusivity and diversity of voices while also retaining the sanctity of the original composition. The committee enlisted 140 vocalists from diverse regional, religious, and ethnic backgrounds and all musical genres across Pakistan. Hyatt served on the audio sub-committee and produced the anthem along with Arshad Mehmood. Hyatt stated: "the idea was representation of all people who called Pakistan their homeland and not restrict it to a certain class or religion but make sure that it puts minorities front and center along with the majority."

=== Work in Velo Sound Station ===
Following the departure of Bilal Maqsood from Velo Sound Station, Hyatt stepped in as executive producer in 2023 for season 2.

== Awards ==
- 2008 Lux Style Awards, Best Original Soundtrack album for Khuda Kay Liye
- Hilal-i-Imtiaz (Crescent of Excellence) Award for Art (Music Composition) by the President of Pakistan in 2022

== See also ==
- Vital Signs
- Khuda Kay Liye
- Music of Pakistan
- Coke Studio (Pakistani TV program)
- List of Pakistani musicians
