= Shahi Hasan =

Pakistani musician

Shahzad Hasan شهزاد حسن
- Also known as: Shahi; Shahi Hasan
- Born: Syed Shahzad Hasan; 2 July 1967 (age 59); Rawalpindi, Punjab, Pakistan
- Genres: Pop; rock
- Occupations: musician; bassist; backing vocalist; record producer
- Instrument: Bass guitar
- Years active: 1986–present
- Labels: EMI Pakistan; Pepsi Pakistan Inc.; PTV Studio; Coke Studio – Pakistan; Pepsi Battle of the Bands

Syed Shahzad Hasan better known as Shahi Hasan, is a Pakistani musician, record producer, occasional actor, bass guitarist, backing vocalist and music industry executive. Co-founding the pop and rock band, Vital Signs, with keyboardist Rohail Hyatt in 1986, he earned recognition as a bass guitarist and an founding member of Vital Signs.

In addition to his role as the band's bass player and backing vocalist, he has undertaken many other roles for the band, such as producing and co-producing their albums, producing backstage music for the popular television series, Coke Studio. In Pakistan, he has been cited as one of the greatest bassist in the country as well as earned much respect in the country for producing the music.

In 2003, he composed the song Mann ki Lagan for the movie Paap, with lyrics penned by Amjad Islam Amjad. The track, which launched the Bollywood career of Rahat Fateh Ali Khan, was based on an original composition by Nusrat Fateh Ali Khan.

In 2013, he recently came in the limelight after collaborating with various musicians to compose the Naya Pakistan and currently hosting the music competitive show, Cornetto Youth Icon on MTV Pakistan.

In April 2013, Hasan joined Meesha Shafi, String, Ali Azmat and Alamgir as a judge on the immensely popular singing talent show Cornetto Music Icons aired on ARY Digital.

Recently in 2017, he appeared as one of the judges in Pepsi Battle of the Bands season 2, he was the only judge retained from the earlier BoB edition back in 2002.
