= Vital Signs (band) =

Pakistani band

- From left to right: Rizwan-ul-Haq, Rohail Hyatt, Junaid Jamshed and Shahzad Hasan

Background information
- Origin: Rawalpindi, Punjab, Pakistan
- Genres: Pop rock; hard rock; progressive rock
- Years active: 1986–1998; 2002; 2013
- Labels: EMI Pakistan, VCI Records, PTV Studios, Pepsi Pakistan Inc. Sony BMG Music Entertainment
- Members: Junaid Jamshed; Rohail Hyatt; Shahzad Hasan
- Past members: Nusrat Hussain; Salman Ahmad; Rizwan-ul-Haq; Amir Zaki

Vital Signs (Urdu: وائٹل سائنز) were a Pakistani pop and rock band formed in Rawalpindi in 1986 by two Peshawar University students. After their formation, they soon became Pakistan's first and most commercially successful as well as critically acclaimed act. The band's popular lineup consisted of keyboardist Rohail Hyatt, bassist Shahzad Hasan, guitarist Nusrat Hussain and vocalist Junaid Jamshed. Rooted in Rawalpindi with some influence from Western music during the conservative regime of President Zia-ul-Haq, the Vital Signs utilizes several genres, ranging from pop music to rock, and often incorporating classical and other elements in innovative ways. In the early 1990s, they came to be perceived by many Pakistani fans and country's cultural observers as a "promising new era of cultural revival". Their enormous popularity significantly opened a new wave of music and a modern chapter in the history of Pakistan.

The band built its reputation playing in university campuses and underground rock music concerts held in different parts of the country, before being noticed by PTV performing art section director Shoaib Mansoor. The band initially gained national prominence and popularity from their music video of their single "Dil Dil Pakistan" first aired on PTV. Written by Shaoib Mansoor, the song became a big commercial hit and critically acclaimed in the public; it was voted, in an unscientific poll as the third most popular song of all time by BBC World. By the early 1990s, the band members had become public celebrities and international stars in the midst of the 1990s. From the 1980s to the 1990s, they produced many of their highly successful and critically praised albums, what many cultural critics consider their finest material including the innovative and widely influential albums, Vital Signs 1 (1989), Vital Signs 2 (1991), Aitebar (1993) and Hum Tum (1995). The success of their second album marked the international prominence of the band, first traveling to the United States to perform, becoming the first Pakistani music act to go abroad on a tour.

After the band dissolved 1998, each member maintained a successful musical career. Leading singer Junaid Jamshed went on to pursue a career as a solo singer and as an Islamic televangelist, Shahzad Hasan concentrated on his work as a music producer and Rohail Hyatt formed a production company. The Vital Signs is considered one of the most successful bands in Pakistan, having influenced many of the pop groups & rock bands originating from the country.

== History ==
=== Early years and formation (1983–1986) ===
The band was formed in early 1983 by two Peshawar University classmates, keyboardist Rohail Hyatt and bassist Shahzad Hassan, in Rawalpindi, Punjab Province of Pakistan, though no names of the band reached consensus. In 1983, the band started playing rock gigs at the local university campus, working with various unknown singers. The band came in contact with Jamshed after spotting him performing rock music gig in Peshawar University and Islamabad University campuses while as a student at UET in Lahore.

In 1986, Hyatt and Hassan officially formed the band after recruiting Nusrat Hussain as lead guitarist. The band began practicing by playing covers of Deep Purple, Eagles, Nazia and Zoheb, and Led Zeppelin in the early 1980s, and they made a name for themselves by playing in local five star hotels. As early as 1986–87, the band began looking for a lead vocalist, often going to local concerts to look for the singers. The band once again met with Junaid Jamshed after the band played with Jamshed at the Marriott hotel in Islamabad in 1987. Since 1983, Hyatt had wanted to recruit Jamshed as the band's lead singer, but was unable to do so when Jamshed left for Peshawar shortly. In 1987, Jamshed joined his engineering university's rock band, Nuts and Bolt, as a lead vocalist and performed at Flashman's Hotel in Rawalpindi. While Jamshed was performing, Nusrat Hussain, and Rohail Hyatt also went to the concert in search of new talent at the hotel. When Jamshed came to perform at the stage, Nusrat had tipped Hyatt off with a "that kid's coming back; the guy you liked" and that "perhaps we should go and see him." Hussain urged Hyatt to see him and after Jamshed's performance; they did and Junaid joined their band. A former band member Junaid Siddiqui was also added to the group to play drums for the hit music video "Dil Dil Pakistan."

At the concert, Hyatt patiently waited for the concert to be over as it stretched on until midnight. The show lasted till 3:00 am because people wouldn't leave, which was unheard of in Islamabad, where people packed up at 10:00pm. Junaid was immediately hired as the band's lead singer and got an offer for a show to open for a band called String Fellow. The promoter asked for a name of the band and during this time, the band had not reached an official name, just a group of four guys. Shahi attributes the name of band to when his older sister, who had just gone to medical university, told them: "This term of how you check the vital signs of life in a person". Hyatt immediately took the suggestion and named them "Vital Signs" for the first time since its formation. Using 'Vital Signs' for the band's name was further reinforced because it was also the name of hit album Vital Signs by Survivor which was one of the influences of the band.

=== Rise to fame and recognition (1987–1989) ===
In mid-1985, the Western-influenced rock music began to be noticed by the public and underground concerts were held all over the country.The rock music jolted the country in a time when the ultra-conservative regime of President General Zia-ul-Haq was reigning supreme as dictator masquerading as "democratically elected". The President with a puppet parliament sanctioning his every move reeked of a Machiavellian brand of so-called "Islamisation." President Zia-ul-Haq had famously and strongly denounced western ideas such as jeans and rock music. Various groups had garnered public attention, and rock music was appreciated as it was out of the ordinary.

It was these political and economic tensions and pretensions, heavy metal power plays and the economic prosperity that also propelled the gradual expansion of the country's urban middle and lower-middle-classes. According to the leftist cultural critic, Nadeem F. Paracha: "The youth culture at that emerged from these classes that launched the first shots of the kind of pop culture, scene and music we now call modern Pakistani pop and rock."

In mid-1986, Benazir Bhutto returned to the country and organised a mammoth rally that weakened the conservative President Zia-ul-Haq. The country's major urban music media centres saw a quiet but certain outpouring of brand new rock bands who wanted to sound somewhat different from the time's top pop-rock scions. Around 1985–87, the band gained national recognition and was offered a music video, by Rana Kanwal who was a producer at the PTV Studio. For PTV Studios, the bands had gone head-to-head into a competition for whoever made the best video, and the winner would play on all the networks across Pakistan. She called Rohail Hyatt and asked the band to compose the classical poem of Parveen Shakir into a rock music video. But unlike their other young contemporaries, Vital Signs performances included ambitious and bold cover songs of famous western bands like Pink Floyd, Rush and a-ha, apart from the usual popular Pakistani film-pop music at that time. In 1987, the band released its first single "Do Pal Ka Jeevan", which became an ultimate success and the band built its reputation in Pakistan's underground music industry.

=== Breakthrough era (1989–1991) ===
The success of their first single made Vital Signs much more popular, and they were soon discovered by famous PTV music producer and film director Shoaib Mansoor at the local concert, who was impressed with Vital Signs' "Do Pal Ka Jeevan" single. The next day, Mansoor called the band and asked them to do a national song which would go on-air all over the country. Written by Shoaib Mansoor and composed by Hyatt, the song which was named "Dil Dil Pakistan" became successful, surprising Hyatt. It was released in the summer of 1987 as a video directed by Shoaib Mansoor, in which the Vital Signs are shown singing the song over what looked like the lush hills of Islamabad. It was an instant hit and later was voted as the third most popular song of all time by BBC World. However, the allure of instant success and the amount of interest Shoaib was ready to invest in the band kept Rohail and Shahzad going and convinced Junaid to hang around for at least the recording of their first album. The band lead guitarist, Nusrat Hussain, left the band and suggested Rohail Hyatt to bring Salman Ahmad as his replacement.

Inspired by a song in Rush's album Moving Pictures, Nusrat Hussain initially composed music for the guitar in the song, but was rejected by Shoaib Mansoor at the first draft as he wanted it to be catchier. Nusrat gave it another go and came up with an intro that was appreciated by the other members. Encouraged by it, especially by Junaid Jamshed, they provided their own inputs and ideas until they completed the tune, Shoaib approved it, and Hyatt composed the music and recorded it.

EMI Pakistan studion expressed interest in helping the band record their debut album. Rohail, Junaid and Shahzad traveled to Karachi to record at EMI's studio, but almost all of it was written and composed at Salman Ahmad's residence where the band had been lodged. Shoaib did all the lyrics while Junaid and Rohail composed the songs.

=== Continued success (1989–1992) ===
With the release of their first major single, Vital Signs began to achieve recognition in Pakistan. Their debut album, Vital Signs 1, was a success leading a wave of fresh new acts in the country. Most of the new acts were part of the many "youth festivals" that began to do the rounds in Karachi and Lahore, especially after one such show was specially conducted and televised by PTV in late 1989.

Shoaib Mansoor also directed a mini-drama, Dhundle Raste, about the true story of the band, in which the band members acted as themselves. The band soon went on a tour throughout the country, playing sell-out concerts in Karachi, Lahore, Islamabad and Peshawar. Some of these, especially the two concerts held in Karachi in late 1989, were among the best concerts by the band.

Salman Ahmad wanted a change in the band's music and by the time the band was approached by Pepsi in December 1990, Rohail decided to isolate Salman from the band and thus he left to form his own band, Junoon. Pressured by Pepsi to come out with a brand new album, the band then replaced Salman with Rizwan-ul-Haq as their new lead guitarist.

In 1991, the band released their second album Vital Signs 2. The album was a departure from the first album's more upbeat ways. The resulting sound emerging from such emotional turmoil and uncertainty was heavily melancholic and introverted ("Rahi", "Yaad Kerna"), suddenly jumping towards thumping anger with the powerful, "Aisa Na Ho". This was perhaps the most political album by the band. The album had more maturity, versatility and was a commercial success. This led the band to perform in the United States on a tour, thus making them the first pop act to do so. The tour also changed the way the band looked, and the band saw the emergence of grunge and a revival of interest in '70s music, and became instigators of fashion. The change also saw Rohail, Shahzad and Junaid moving to Karachi (Rizwan decided to stay back in Islamabad), as Rohail started constructing a brand new studio in his Karachi apartment.

After performing a number of concerts managed by Rohail's elder brother Zahid, the group headed out with director Shoaib Mansoor to film Guitar '93, a Pepsi-financed venture featuring videos shot all across Pakistan.

=== Aetibar and Greatest Hits (1993–1995) ===
After the departure of Salman Ahmad, Hyatt's childhood friend Rizwan-ul-Haq was asked to join the band as lead guitarist. Rizwan, an electrical engineer, left Islamabad for Karachi to join the band and the Signs began work on their third album in Rohail Hyatt's studios, Pyramid Studios, in 1993. The third album Aitebar, which soon outsold its predecessor, Vital Signs 2, was an ultimate success. The Signs then started their nationwide tour and collaborated with Shoaib Mansoor who directed "Guitar '93, a compilation of videos of Vital Signs' biggest hits thus far. It shot across the four provinces and was financed by Pepsi Pakistan Inc. Made for PTV, Guitar '93 was an entertaining document of the band's progress as one of the best pop/rock acts in Pakistan.

With the release of Guitar'93, it was Rizwan who gained a lot of publicity and notability, and Signs also played their highest number of concerts in 1993. The biggest took place at the KMC Stadium in Karachi, a mega-concert headlined by the Signs and also consisting of performances from The Milestones, Awaz and the newly formed rock band, Arsh. Former member Salman Ahmad was present in the audience. It was after this concert Rohail first started to show signs of agitation regarding his growing dissatisfaction with Rizwan-ul-Haq's playing and his expenses. The success of Aetibar and Guitar'93 marked a great opportunity for Signs. The Signs marked its first international tour to US in 1993, becoming the first Pakistan musical act to do so.

=== Hum Tum (1995) and world tours ===
In 1994, the band did not extend the contract for its guitarist, Rizwan-ul-Haq, despite his urgings. Rizwan was relieved and "shown the door" after which Hyatt chose technical guitar whiz Aamir Zaki to become the band's new lead guitarist.

The Signs made its second tour to the United States with Zaki on board as the band's lead guitarist. Soon returning, the band started to work on their fourth and final installment, Hum Tum. Zaki was given the impression he was joining the band as a full member, not a session player, but was asked to leave after recording just three songs of the album. In a book, "Personal Biography" on Signs published online, Zaki had serious disagreement with the band leader, Hyatt, on the direction the band was taking.= Hyatt later stated that the predominant reason was because Aamir Zaki had criticized David Gilmour's guitar-playing while the band was touring the UK and attending a Pink Floyd concert. Hyatt famously quoted: "That's ridiculous! That's one person's (Aamir's) opinion. You don't fight or drop out of bands because of that." Following the departure of Zaki, the Signs quickly hired Awaz band member, Asad Ahmed, as the band's lead guitarist who would play at the UK concerts. In a turmoil situation, Hyatt soon left the Signs clashing with lead singer Junaid Jamshed and bassist Shahzad Hassan over a contractual obligation the band had for a series of concerts in the US, after Zaki joined the Signs for a US tour. Rohail Hyatt then also went on to start a music magazine called Vibes.

=== Upheaval and break-up in 1998 ===
While on the US and UK tour, the Signs felt the need of Hyatt; therefore upon returning to Pakistan, the band quickly reconciled with Hyatt, and fired Zaki. Ahmad joined the band and played guitar for the rest of the pending album, with Hyatt on keyboards. For the fourth album, the Signs collaborated with Shoaib Mansoor; all of the songs were written by Mansoor and sung by Jamshed.

Finally in 1995, the Signs released Hum Tum which gained positive response from the country's electronic media. According to the music critics, the music mood on Hum Tum was somber, but more stoic and fatalistic, with Junaid's brilliantly vocals and Shoaib Mansoor's words of fatalistic resignation in the album. In spite of its success, the Signs faced competition when the media constantly compared the Vital Signs to Junoon, led by rival and former guitarist Salman Ahmad.

The aesthetic and commercial success of the album was not enough as Rohail and Shahzad were ideologically and aesthetically drifting away from Juniad Jamshed and Shoaib Mansoor. The Signs struggled to keep itself united when the Signs toured to South Africa without its band leader Hyatt. The media then quickly speculated about the break-up of the band as early as 1996. Though Hyatt joined the Signs in 1997, the Signs made its final tour in the UK.

Though the band's demise was never officially announced, by 1998 when the Signs were offered a deal by Pepsi Pakistan Inc. for another album, Rohail declined, signaling the end of Vital Signs. Junaid Jamshed went on to pursue a career as a solo singer, and Shahzad Hasan concentrated on his work as a music producer with Rohail Hyatt who formed a production company, known as "Pyramid Productions".

== After years ==
=== VS-Remixes release in 1999 ===
In 1999, Rohail Hyatt released the collection of the Signs album songs, mixed with music remixes. The VS-Remixes received negative reception from its music journalists, though interested in the idea. The VS-Remixes album's only one single, "Maula", which was the only original piece, escaped mediocrity and garnered positive marks.Maula, a patriotic song, became an ultimate success and the song received a lot of appraisal from the music journalists.

=== Reunion in 2002 Nazia Hassan concert ===
The Signs confirmed their participation in a "Nazia Hassan Tribute Concert" to be held in Karachi on 9 March 2002. Popularly known as "Queen of Pakistan Pop music", Nazia Hassan died of lung cancer in London, shocking the entire country. The Signs sang their popular songs for the first time in almost 7 years. The concert was attended by an enthusiastic audience and it was their original line-up which went up on stage, a line-up that hadn't played together ever since mid-1990, and who still stole the show.

The Vital Signs reunited for a 30-minute performance at the concert. After the Nazia Tribute Concert, the media speculated that Vital Signs could record fifth album. The speculations were denied by the band.

=== 2013 collaboration ===
After 11 years, the members of Vital Signs and Junoon collaborated to release a patriotic song, Naya Pakistan. Written by Salman Ahmad and Aania Shah featuring Shahzad Hassan on bass guitar, Nusrat Hussain on keyboards, and vocalist Junaid Jamshed. The song was recorded at Indus Music World Studios and released on 22 February 2013.

Salman Ahmed while talking about his latest project at BBC Pakistan said, "For almost a decade, Junaid has always asked me not to bring guitar or to ask him to sing. When you are friends with somebody you always have to transcend differences and I respect Junaid's views. Junaid once told me that his biggest regret was not to be a part of Jazba Junoon's recording. So when we came up with "Naya Pakistan", I asked him that this is the chance that's not going to come again so finally Junaid accepted the offer with the condition that he will sing only the opening lines with no music at all." and further added "it signifies the metaphor for unity as we have to compromise for unity in hope of Naya Pakistan."

== Musical style ==
Vital Signs were most heavily influenced by Pink Floyd. Musically and lyrically, they have also cited bands such as a-ha, Rush, ABBA, Scorpions, Duran Duran, Survivor, Radiohead, The Police and Led Zeppelin as their major influences. They were also widely known as Pakistan's first and most successful pop band and were given the title of "pioneers of pop music".

Several bands and artists have cited Vital Signs as an influence or inspiration, including Abbas Ali Khan, Atif Aslam, Jal, Kaavish, Aaroh, SYMT and Fuzön.

== Cultural legacy and influence ==
The Vital Signs emerged when Pakistan was undergoing Islamization. Such Western ideas were denounced in the country, and the film industry was quickly declining in competition with the counterrevolution of the Indian film industry. According to the editorial written in The Express Tribune in 2011, the "Vital Signs and Pakistan's ingenious rock music was the only "arsenal" the country had against India's encroaching entertainment industry".

In a short span of time, the members of Vital Signs gained enormous popularity and were generally welcomed by the public; sometimes named the Beatles of Pakistan. Whilst Noor Jehan, Abida Parveen, Mehdi Hassan, Salma Agha, and Nusrat Fateh Ali Khan remained mostly attached to Pakistan's film industry, the Vital Signs reached out to the regional and young population of the country. With the rise of Vital Signs and later, Junoon and others, the rock music exploded in the 1990s to become a vehicle for expressing patriotic nationalist spirit in Pakistan. According to the biographers of Vital Signs, despite the Western looks and influence of the Vital Signs, all of the members of Vital Signs were treated like country's most "beloved celebrities".

According to the cultural critics and observers, all of the members of Vital Signs had become what members of The Beatles had become in the United States and the United Kingdom during the 1960s. Vital Signs were followed by Junoon, Awaz, Strings, and Jupiters, which all of whom had exploded the pop and rock music genre in the country, bringing the significant shift of the country's transformation into modernism during the 1990s. Undoubtedly, Vital Signs' music has been one major influential force which has truly kept the national spirits high amidst the prevailing social woes which have worsened since the 1980s; such music included songs like "Dil Dil Pakistan" and many more.

== Discography ==
Studio albums

- 1989: Vital Signs 1
- 1991: Vital Signs 2
- 1993: Aitebar
- 1995: Hum Tum

== Band members ==
Final lineup

- Junaid Jamshed Khan – lead vocals (1986–1998)
- Rohail Hyatt – guitars, keyboards, piano, backing vocals (1986–1998)
- Shahzad Hassan – bass (1986–1998)

== See also ==
- List of Pakistani music bands
