= Shoaib Mansoor =

Writer, Television & Film Producer

- Born: 4 February 1951 (age 75); Karachi, Sindh, Pakistan
- Occupations: TV & Film Director, Writer, Producer, Lyricist, Musician
- Years active: 1976–present
- Spouse: Anila Khan
- Children: Zohaib Mansoor Maham Mansoor Sahib Mansoor
- Awards: Pride of Performance Award (2002); Sitara-e-Imtiaz (Star of Excellence) Award (2008); PTV Award; Cairo International Film Festival; Lux Style Award; Roberto Rossellini Award; London Asian Film Festival; IRDS Film Awards

Shoaib Mansoor (Urdu: شعیب منصور; born 4 February 1951 in Karachi) is a Pakistani television and film director, writer, producer, lyricist and musician.

Active in the television industry since 1976, when he produced one of PTV's first programmes to be aired in colours, the music show Jharnay, he first found success for composing and writing the song Dil Dil Pakistan in 1987, thereby introducing Vital Signs musical band in mainstream Pakistani television. He was also well-recognised for directing many critically acclaimed hit drama series on Pakistani television.

He became internationally known and popular for directing TV shows including the 1982 classic Ankahi, comedy series Fifty Fifty (1980) and the travel documentary show, Gulls and Guys which was sponsored by the John Player Gold Leaf company and which was a commercial success reality show, and the military fiction series, Alpha Bravo Charlie (1998). Mansoor found further critical acclaim for his musical abilities, writing songs for Vital Signs in the 1990s and introduced the band nationwide. A versatile artist, he became a popular and respected film director after the release of critically acclaimed films Khuda Kay Liye (2007) and Bol (2011). Mansoor won much acclaim for his work including the Sitara-i-Imtiaz Award from the President of Pakistan in 2008.

== Career ==
Pride of Performance Award Recipient
- Date: 2002
- Country: Pakistan
- Presented by: Government of Pakistan

Shoaib Mansoor or ShoMan (as he calls himself) is among the most influential and famous figures in the Karachi entertainment sector. He has directed, written and produced super hit TV shows such as Ankahi, Fifty Fifty, Alpha Bravo Charlie, Sunehrey Din and Gulls & Guys, which aired on Pakistan Television Corporation (PTV).

Shoaib Mansoor has also been a successful songwriter and music composer. Back in the 1980s, he introduced the pop sensation Vital Signs to the mainstream media. Besides being Junaid Jamshed's mentor and writing the lyrics for the song Dil Dil Pakistan, he was the backbone for the band's songs and composed and produced most of the Vital Signs' albums. Between 2001 and 2003, he directed the Ishq Mohabbat Apna Pan music video picturised on Iman Ali and Rasheed Naz. He wrote and composed a number of Vital Signs' hit numbers such as Aitebar. In addition, he directed all of Vital Signs' videos and also produced a music video compilation and a movie titled Geetar '93.

In 2007, Shoaib Mansoor debuted as a film director with the critically acclaimed film Khuda Kay Liye released on 20 July 2007 all over Pakistan. It received the Silver Pyramid Award from the Cairo International Film Festival for 2007.

In 2009, he began directing a big budget film Bol, with Atif Aslam, Mahira Khan, Humaima Malick and Iman Ali playing lead roles. The premiere was on 24 June 2011.

Shoaib Mansoor's fourth film Verna starring Mahira Khan as the main female lead was released by Hum Films on 17 November 2017.

== Filmography ==
Year	Film	Director	Producer	Screenwriter	Music composer
2007	Khuda Kay Liye	Yes	Yes	Yes	No
2011	Bol	Yes	Yes	Yes	Yes
2017	Verna	Yes	Yes	Yes	Yes
TBA	Aasmaan Bolay Ga	Yes	Yes	Yes	Yes

== Television ==
- Jharnay (1976)
- Fifty Fifty (PTV sketch comedy) (1979-1984)
- Ankahi (PTV drama series, 1982)
- Music '89 (PTV pop music show, 1989)
- Sunehrey Din (PTV drama series)
- Leadings From The Front (Documentary on cricketer Imran Khan, 1993)
- Geetar '93 (The Vital Signs music video collection, 1993)
- Alpha Bravo Charlie (PTV drama series, 1997)
- Gulls & Guys (PTV travel show, 1999)
- Dhundle Raste (PTV)
- Jharnay (pop music show)
- Junoon Abhi Kum Nahin Huaa
- PTV Awards Ceremony 1986
- Lux Style Award Ceremony 2008

== Awards and achievements ==
In recognition of his outstanding services, Mansoor has been decorated with presidential award of Pride of Performance in 2002 and Sitara-e-Imtiaz by the Government of Pakistan in 2008. He has also been awarded PTV Lifetime Achievement Award by the then-President of Pakistan Pervez Musharraf on the 43rd anniversary of Pakistan Television in November 2007. In 2007, he received the Silver Pyramid Award from the Cairo International Film Festival for Khuda Ke Liye. His film Bol (2011) was awarded the Best Film award in IRDS Film awards 2011 by Institute for Research and Documentation in Social Sciences (IRDS), a Lucknow-based civil society organisation, for raising many social issues including the regressive attitude of a male-dominated society. He has also won Lux Style Award, Roberto Rossellini Award, London Asian Film Festival and was nominated for Asia Pacific Screen Awards.

Year	Award	Category	Title	Result
2005	The 1st Indus Drama Awards	Special Award for Direction	Fifty Fifty	Won
2007	Cairo International Film Festival	Silver Pyramid Award	Khuda Kay Liye	Won
2007	PTV Award	Lifetime Achievement Award		Won
2007	Roberto Rossellini Award	Best Film	Khuda Kay Liye	Won
2008	Sitara-e-Imtiaz (Star of Excellence) Award by the President of Pakistan	Achievement		Won
2002	Pride of Performance Award by the President of Pakistan	Achievement		Won
2011	IRDS Film Awards	Best Hindi Film Award	Bol	Won
2011	London Asian Film Festival	Best Film	Bol	Won
2011	Asia Pacific Screen Awards	Best Screenplay	Bol	Nominated

=== Lux Style Awards ===
Ceremony	Category	Project	Result
3rd Lux Style Awards	Best Video Director	Anarkali	Won
7th Lux Style Awards	Best Film	Khuda Kay Liye	Won
11th Lux Style Awards	Best Film	Bol	Won
11th Lux Style Awards	Best Original Soundtrack	Bol	Nominated
17th Lux Style Awards	Best Film	Verna	Nominated
17th Lux Style Awards	Best Film Director	Verna	Nominated
