= Music of Pakistan =

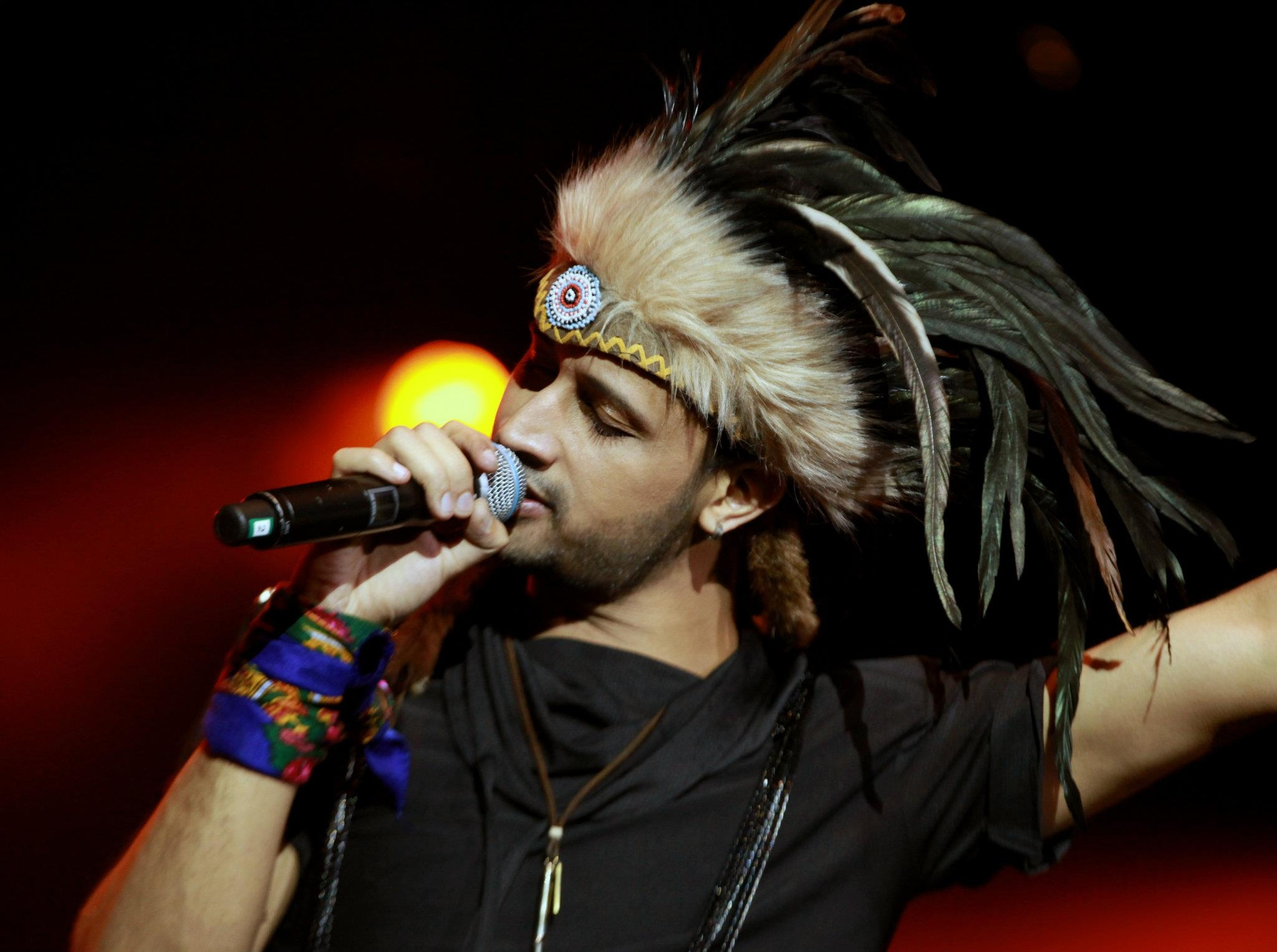
Atif Aslam performing at The O2 Arena.

The Music of Pakistan (Urdu: موسیقی پاکستان) includes South Asian, Central Asian, Middle Eastern and contemporary Western influences. The genre has adapted and evolved over time in response to shifting cultural norms and global influences.

It has been shaped by Persian, Arab and Turkish traditions among others. Hindustani classical music forms like qawwali (Sufi devotional music) and ghazal (love poetry) are popular, as are Punjabi, Pashto, Sindhi and Balochi regional music. Islamization policies during the 1980s imposed strict censorship on music and musical expression. In the late 20th-century and beyond, globalization significantly influenced Pakistani music, with elements of Western popular music merging with local traditions to create contemporary genres.

As of 2015, EMI Pakistan is the country's biggest record label, holding the licenses of some 60,000 Pakistani artists and around 70% of the total music of the country.

== Traditional music ==
=== Folk music ===
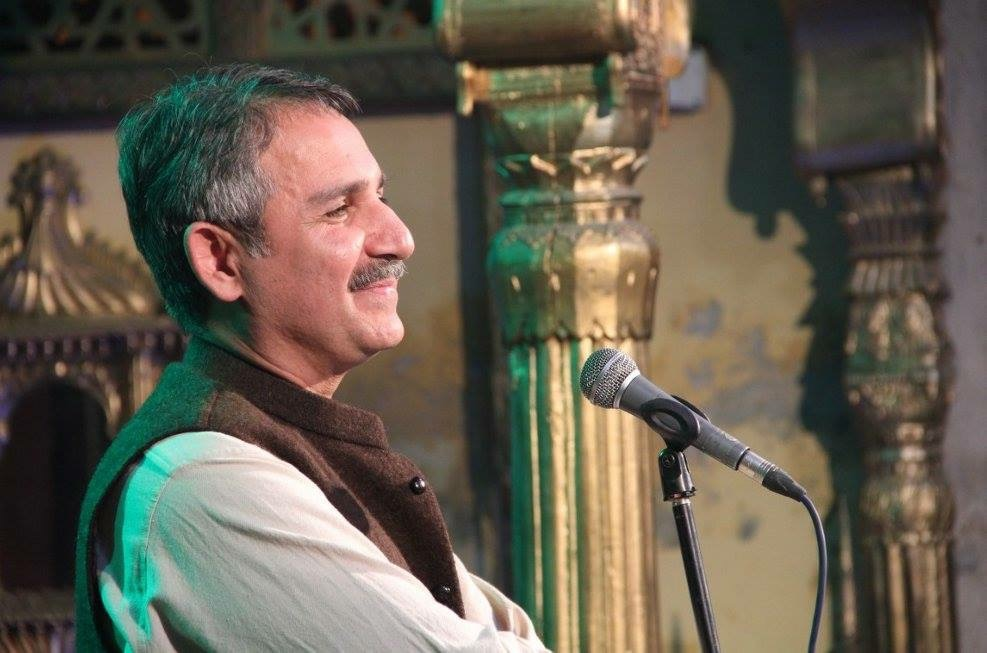
Haroon Bacha performing at AVT Khyber's "Sparle Suroona" in Peshawar, Pakistan. Bacha was forced to leave Pakistan and resettle in Brooklyn, New York, after the Taliban threatened his life for refusing to abandon music.

Pakistan has diverse folk traditions, with each region reflecting its local culture and language through its musical traditions. These folk traditions are passed down through generations and often form the core of community events, rituals, and festivals, typically celebrating themes of village life, nature, bravery, spirituality, love, longing and separation. Some of the famous folk singers/bands of Pakistan include Zarsanga, Sanam Marvi, Nazia Iqbal, Gul Panra, Raheem Shah, Saieen Zahoor, Abida Parveen, Ghazala Javed, Tina Sani, Musarrat Nazir, Tahira Syed, Laila Khan, Naheed Akhtar, Zeb Bangash, Suraiya Multanikar, Allan Fakir, Alam Lohar, Hadiqa Kiani, Ali Zafar, Haroon Bacha, and Khumarian.

==== Pashto music ====
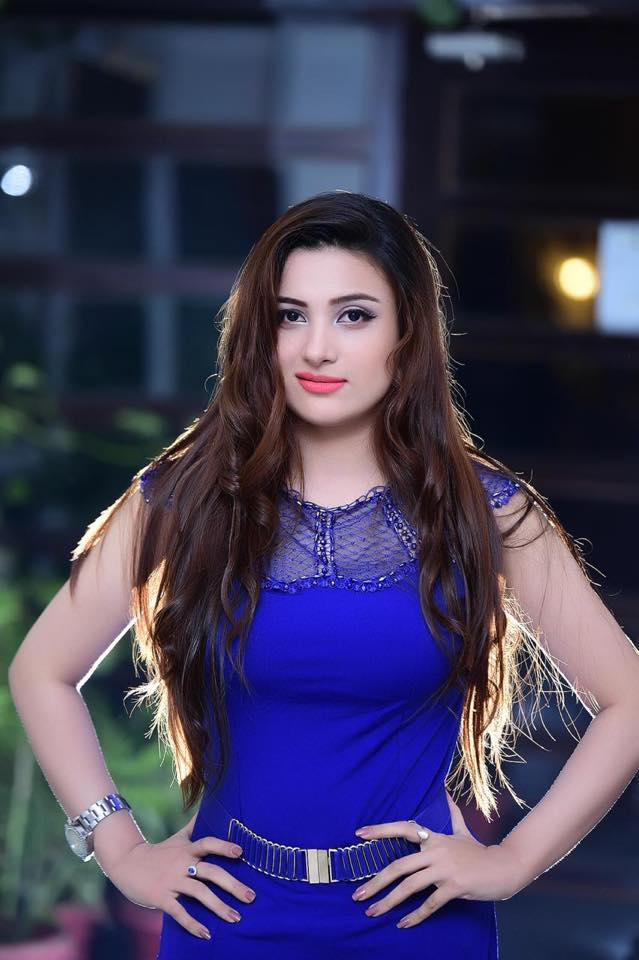
Laila Khan, a Pashto singer, who has also sung in Urdu, Arabic, and French.

Pashto music is predominantly found in the Khyber Pakhtunkhwa province. There is a long oral tradition of Pashto folk music, which includes genres such as the charbeta, neemkai, loba, shaan and badala.

Charbeta is a highly popular form of Pashto poetry, often epic in nature, focusing on heroic figures and events. It is typically performed at a fast tempo by two or more singers. Neemkai is a type of folk song usually composed by Pashto women, expressing themes drawn from daily life and personal experiences.

Loba is a dramatic form of Pashto folk song, often a dialogue that tells romantic stories or allegorical tales. Shaan is a celebratory song performed during significant life events, such as marriages or the birth of a child. Badala, is an epic poem set to music and accompanied by instruments like the harmonium, drums, and tabla. Although it is a form of folk music, it is typically performed by professional musicians.

==== Sindhi music ====
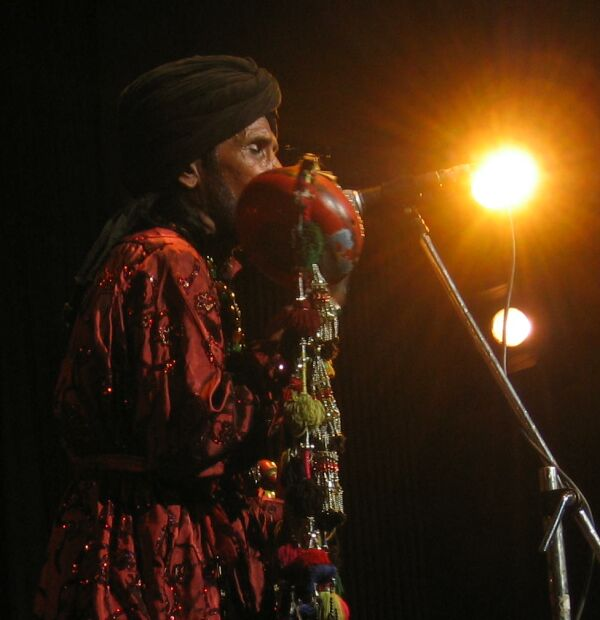
Sufi folk singer Saieen Zahoor performing live.

Sindhi music is traditionally performed in two primary styles: bait and waee. The bait style is a form of vocal music, characterized by two variations: sanhoon (low voice) and Graham (high voice). On the other hand, waee is primarily instrumental and often involves the use of string instruments. Waee music is also referred to as kafi and is also found in the neighbouring Punjab. Common instruments used in Sindhi regional music include the yaktaro (a one-string instrument), narr (a type of flute), and naghara (a drum). The themes in Sindhi music often center around Sufism and mysticism.

==== Balti music ====
According to Balti folklore, Mughal princess Gul Khatoon (known in Baltistan as Mindoq Gialmo—Flower Queen) brought musicians and artisans with her into the region and they propagated Mughal music and art under her patronage. Musical instruments such as the surnai, karnai, dhol and chang were introduced into Baltistan. Classical and other dances are classified as sword dances, broqchhos and ghazal dances.

==== Balochi music ====
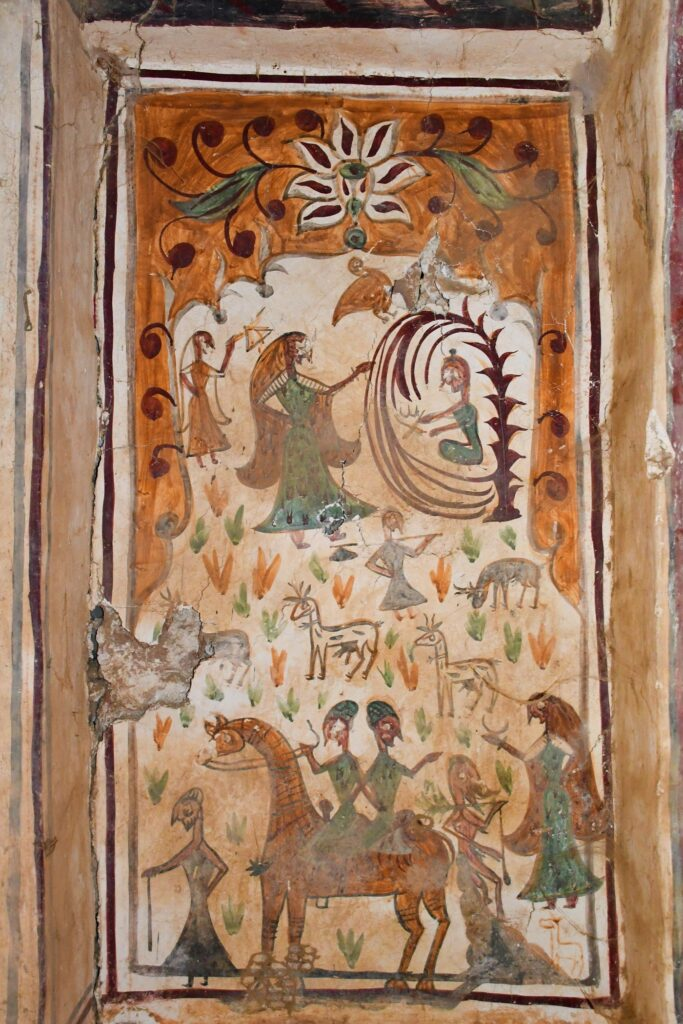
Mural panel from the necropolis of Mian Nasir Muhammad Kalhoro in Dadu District, Pakistan, depicting the romance of Laila and Majnun (above), a famous Arabian folklore, and Sasui and Punhun (below), a Punjabi and Sindhi legend frequently celebrated in Pakistani folk music.

Balochi music, primarily found in the Pakistani province of Balochistan. Common instruments used in Balochi music include the suroz, donali, and benju. Notable musical forms in Balochi culture include sepad, shabtagi, vazbad and zayirak, which are performed in various rituals.

==== Punjabi music ====
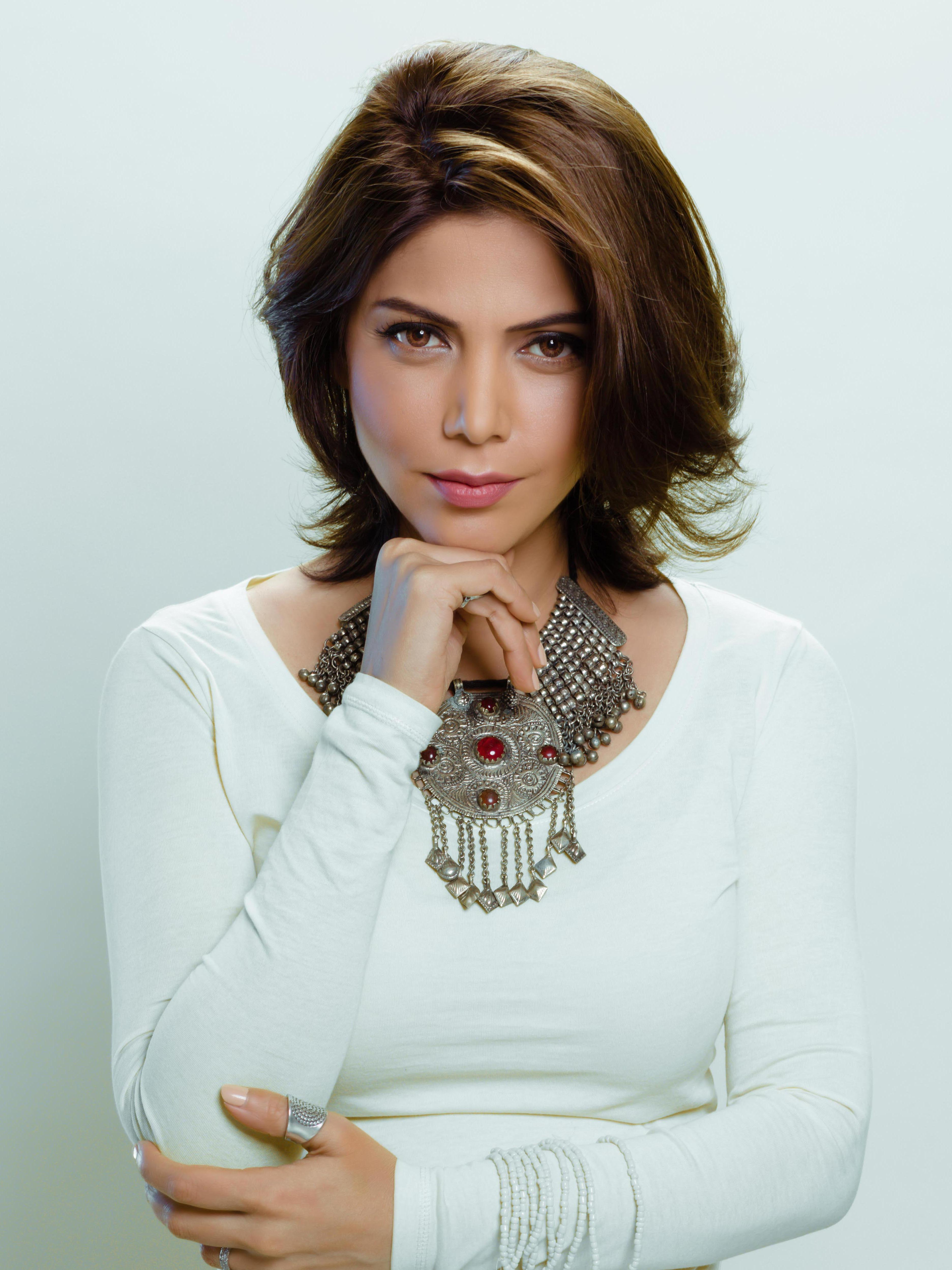
Hadiqa Kiani, renowned Pakistani singer known for her contributions to folk and pop music in Urdu and Punjabi, among other languages.

Folk music from the Punjab is rich and varied, showcasing a range of instruments such as the dhol (a large drum), flute, dholak (a smaller drum), and tumbi (a single-stringed instrument). The folk music invokes the traditions and tells stories of agricultural life, love, and joy. Famous folklores, such as that of Sassi Punnu, are often the poetic content of Punjabi folk music.

=== Qawwali ===
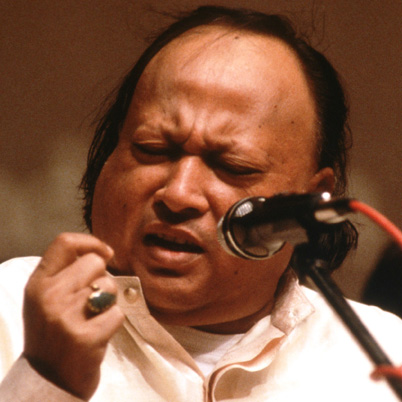
Nusrat Fateh Ali Khan performing at the WOMAD festival in Reading, c. 1993

One of the most notable genres of traditional Pakistani music is qawwali, a devotional musical form. A key characteristic of Qawwali is its emphasis on improvisation and lyrics derived from Sufi poetry, often expressing themes of divine love, longing, and spiritual devotion. In recent decades, however, Qawwali has increasingly incorporated secular themes into its repertoire.

The word "Qawwali" is derived from the Arabic term "qawl", meaning "saying" or "utterance." A session of Qawwali is formally referred to as "Mehfil-e-Sama," as it is considered a form of sama, a Sufi tradition performed as part of the meditation and prayer practice known as dhikr.

Qawwali music is performed by a group of about 8 to 12 musicians, called humnawa (Urdu: ہم نوا, lit. 'one who sings in harmony with') led by a principal singer. The performance incorporates various musical instruments alongside hand clapping by the singers. Common instruments used in qawwali include the harmonium, tabla, rubab, sitar, sarangi, and tanpura. In a 2015 profile on the Indian news website Scroll.in, while noting its rising popularity, it was estimated that there were more than 100 hereditary Qawwal parties, many centuries‑old, mostly located in Karachi and Punjab, the total number of individual Qawwals active in the country could thus be estimated between 1,000 and 2,000.

Qawwali gained international acclaim through Nusrat Fateh Ali Khan, often hailed as "Shahenshah-e-Qawwali" (Urdu: شهنشاهِ قوالی, lit. 'The King of Qawwali'). In 2016, LA Weekly ranked Khan as the fourth greatest singer of all time. One of his most celebrated albums, Night Song, produced in collaboration with Michael Brook, reached number 4 on the Billboard Top World Music Albums chart in 1996 and was nominated for a Grammy Award for Best World Music Album in 1997.

=== Ghazal ===
The ghazal is a form of poetry consisting of couplets which share a rhyme and a refrain, with both lines of the opening couplet and the second line of each subsequent couplet adhering to the same meter. Etymologically, the word "ghazal" originates from Arabic, where it means "to flirt," and often denotes themes of love and longing in Arabic poetry.

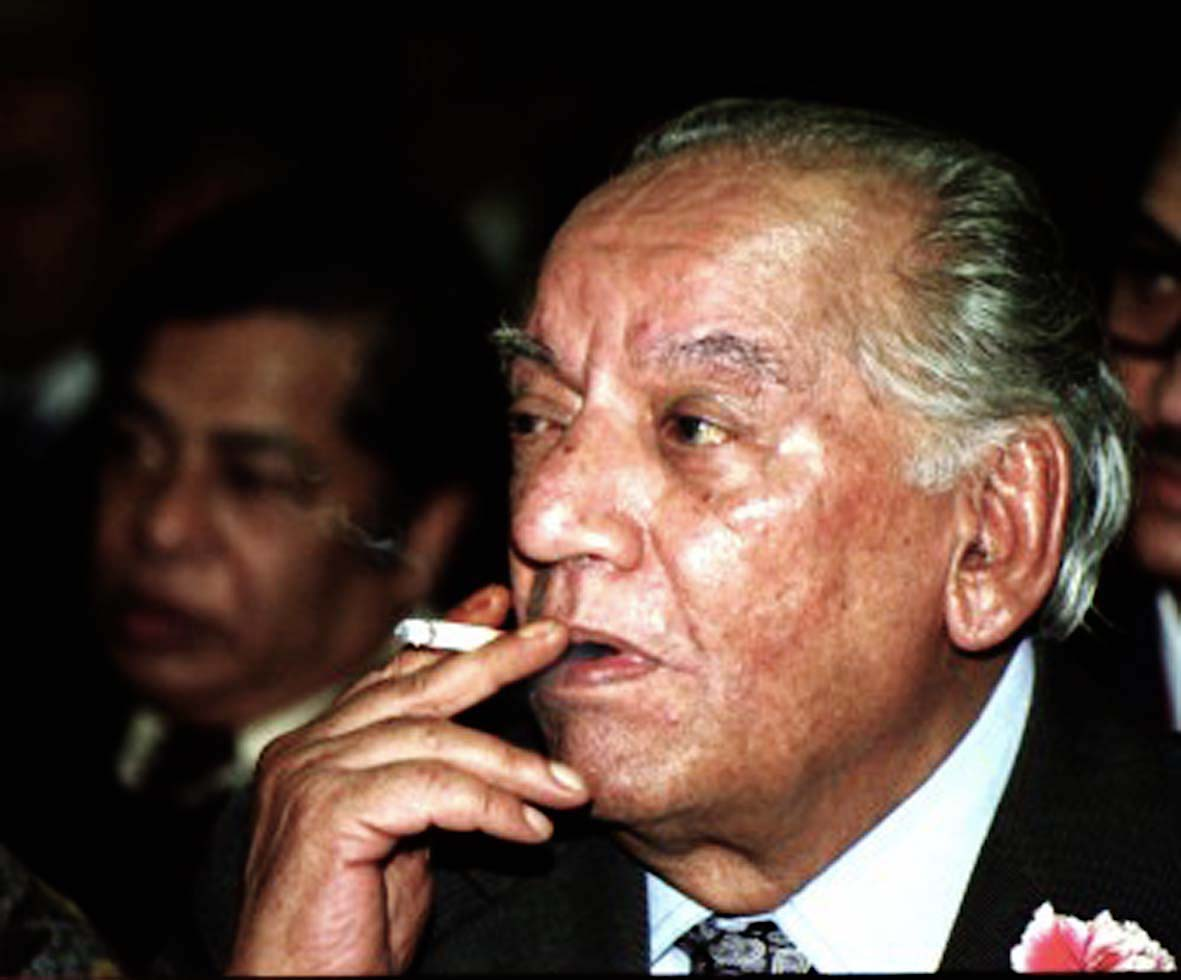
The renowned poet Faiz Ahmad Faiz sought asylum Beirut, Lebanon, during the Islamization regime of General Zia Ul Haq in Pakistan due to his support for Marxism. Faiz was awarded the Lenin Peace Prize in 1962 by the Soviet Union and was also nominated for the Nobel Prize in literature. His ghazals and poetry, known for their blend of political and romantic themes, have been rendered in both traditional and modern musical styles.

While traditionally rooted in poetry, the ghazal in Pakistan has evolved to become closely associated with music. The works of renowned poets like Mirza Ghalib, Muhammad Iqbal, Faiz Ahmed Faiz, Ahmed Faraz, and Parveen Shakir have seen musical adaptations. Ghazal music originally adhered to the Hindustani classical tradition, employing ragas (melodic modes) and talas (rhythmic cycles), typically at a slow, contemplative tempo. In modern times, however, ghazals have seen a fusion with genres such as light classical, jazz, rock, or pop music, resulting in a more contemporary sound that retains the lyrical beauty of its origins.

Numerous musicians have made a name through the ghazal genre, including Mehdi Hassan, Ghulam Ali and Tina Sani, and in 2009 in the Indian newspaper Deccan Herald we could read that "in the Indian Sub-continent, Pakistan has the largest number of ghazal singers."

== Modern music ==
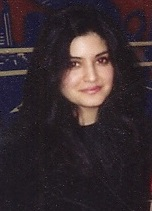
Nazia Hassan, widely celebrated as the "Queen of Pakistani Pop."

The song "Ko Ko Korina" sung by Ahmed Rushdi in 1966 is considered to be the first pop song of Pakistan. The 1980s saw the brother-sister duo Nazia and Zoheb Hassan. Their debut album Disco Deewane, released in 1981, broke sales records in Pakistan and became the best-selling Asian pop album at the time. It also the topped charts in India, Russia, West Indies and Latin America. Another popular act of the 1980s was the pop and rock band Vital Signs, with Junaid Jamshed as the vocalist and Rohail Hyatt as the keyboardist. From the 1980s to the 1990s, they produced many of their highly successful and critically praised albums. Their song "Dil Dil Pakistan" was voted as the third most popular song of all time by a BBC World poll in 2003.

However, the 1980s were also the time of rapid political change in Pakistan, driven by the Islamization policies of President Muhammad Zia Ul Haq, who came to power through a coup d'état in 1977. Zia's regime sought to implement a conservative Islamic agenda, which came with strict bans and restrictions on musical expression across the country. Even the song "Dil Dil Pakistan" by Vital Signs, despite, a patriotic anthem, got censored for showing young men in Western clothing. Zia Ul Haq had strongly denounced "western ideas" such as jeans and rock music. The regime also banned music for reasons such as "endorsing alcohol consumption" if lyrics mentioned alcohol, or "obscenity" if a male and female were shown standing close or dancing. This period also saw the closure of all bars, nightclubs, and theater halls in the country, depriving aspiring musicians and bands of venues to perform and earn a living.

=== Pop music ===
Despite the crackdown on music during the Islamization regime, Pakistani music continued to evolve, often thriving in underground performances, through artists who continued to defy the regime. In the 1980s and 1990s, pop acts like Nazia and Zoheb Hassan, Vital Signs and Strings gained widespread popularity, defining a new era of Pakistani pop music. The 1990s also saw the rise of rock and fusion bands such as Junoon, Aaroh, and Noori, which became household names and enjoyed immense popularity. By the early 2000s, a fresh wave of pop acts has emerged, including Ali Zafar, Momina Mustehsan, Zoe Viccaji, Hadiqa Kiani, Awaz (Haroon, Faakhir Mehmood), Jal and Atif Aslam.

=== Rock music ===
The rise of rock music in Pakistan began in the 1980s when cassettes first came into Pakistan bringing in a wave of Western rock music, particularly groups such as Pink Floyd, Led Zeppelin, Van Halen, and AC/DC. Despite the restrictive environment of the Islamization era, underground rock concerts began to flourish across the country. Rock bands Vital Signs and Strings gained immense popularity amongst the youth. Vital Signs is widely regarded as Pakistan's first and most successful pop rock band. Strings gained acclaim following the release of their second album in 1992, eventually selling over 25 million albums worldwide.

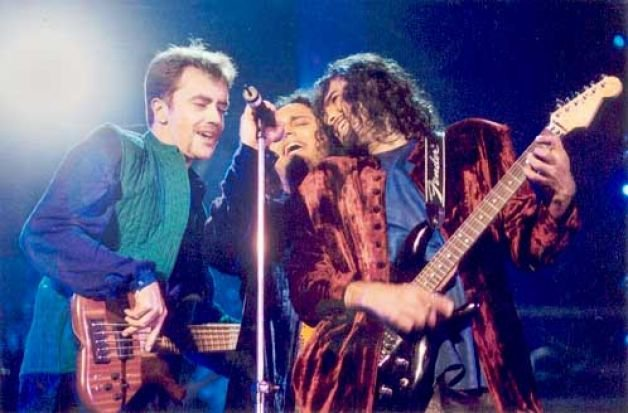
The Sufi rock band Junoon during a live performance.

The 1990s saw the rise of other notable bands, including Junoon, Aaroh, and Noori. Junoon pioneered the genre of Sufi rock, combining the poetry of famous Sufi poets such as Rumi, Hafez, and Bulleh Shah with the hard rock brand of Led Zeppelin and Santana and classical instruments such as the tabla. Junoon is one of Pakistan's most successful bands with over 30 million albums sold worldwide; the New York Times called Junoon "the U2 of Pakistan" and Q magazine dubbed them as "One of the biggest bands in the world". Junoon became the first rock band to perform at the United Nations General Assembly Hall and only the second Pakistani act to perform at a Nobel Peace Prize Concert.

The early 2000s saw the arrival of progressive metal, progressive rock, and psychedelic rock with bands such as Entity Paradigm and Mizraab. Qayaas, Call, Roxen, Jal, Mizmaar, Karavan, and Mekaal Hasan Band also exploded onto the music scene with different brands of rock including alternative and soft rock. The television series Pepsi Battle of the Bands was instrumental in launching Entity Paradigm, Aaroh, and the Mekaal Hasan Band, all of whom competed in the inaugural edition of the show in 2002. After a 15-year hiatus, the series resumed in 2017, introducing new bands to the rock scene, such as Kashmir, Bayaan, and Badnaam.

Although the heavy metal genre began to rise in popularity in the late 1990s and early 2000s, its roots can be traced back to the influence of the New Wave of British Heavy Metal (NWOBHM) of the late 1970s and 1980s. Early pioneers of Pakistani heavy metal included bands like Black Warrant, Final Cut, and Barbarians. Since then, a number of heavy and black metal bands have emerged, including Overload, Saturn, Saakin, Karakoram, Burq - The Band, Taarma, The Nuke, and Aag.

=== Patriotic and political music ===
Patriotic songs, such as Nusrat Fateh Ali Khan's "Mera Paigham Pakistan", Vital Signs' "Dil Dil Pakistan", Awaz's "Ay Jawan", and Shabana Benjamin's "Aye Gul-e-Yasmeen", have become anthems.

Inter Services Public Relations (ISPR), the media arm of Pakistan's powerful military, is colloquially referred to as its "propaganda house" and regularly produces and sponsors music that glorifies the military. ISPR uses music and other forms of media to shape the military’s image, its productions frequently use emotional imagery and lyrics to frame dissent and criticism of the military as an attack on personnel who are on the frontlines, sacrificing their lives for the nation’s security and well-being.

In addition to state-sponsored patriotic music, political parties in Pakistan have also harnessed the power of music to rally their supporters. Political songs are regularly featured during rallies, gatherings, and protests to energize crowds. At the same time, music serves as a powerful tool for activism and resistance. Songs such as "Intebah" by Saakin, "Mori Araj Suno" by Tina Sani (based on Faiz Ahmed Faiz's poetry), and "Wajood-e-Zan" by Natasha Noorani (based on Muhammad Iqbal's poetry) have become iconic in Pakistan's activism culture, representing dissent and resistance to political injustice.

=== Revival ===
In the decades following the Islamization regime, restrictions on music in Pakistan eased somewhat, and the rise of the internet opened new avenues for sharing and accessing music.

==== Coke Studio Pakistan ====
Coke Studio Pakistan, a music television series, aimed to revive the blended identity of Pakistani music. The first season mainly featured live-recorded performances of pop and rock songs. From Season 2 onward, the show began emphasizing Pakistan's original musical identity, while also evolving by fusing in more contemporary Western influences—a trend that became more prominent in Seasons 3, 5, and 6. As the show's founder and director, Rohail Hyatt, described, the aim was to "promote Pakistan's folk, classical, and indigenous music by merging it with more popular or mainstream music." However, after Hyatt's departure at the end of Season 6, the show took a different direction. From Season 7 onward, Coke Studio shifted to a more mainstream style, increasingly incorporating more visual communicating and Lollywood influences to attract a wider audience. This shift also expanded Coke Studio’s appeal in India, with viewership from Indian audiences surpassing that of Pakistan on platforms like YouTube and streaming services.

== See also ==
- Culture of Pakistan
- Filmi pop
- History of Pakistani pop music
- Karachi: The Musical
- Category:Pakistani singers
- List of Pakistani musicians
- List of Pakistani film singers
- List of Pakistani folk singers
- List of Pakistani ghazal singers
- List of Pakistani qawwali singers
- List of Pakistani music bands
- List of songs about Pakistan
- National Academy of Performing Arts
- Nescafé Basement
- Pakistani hip hop
- Uth Records
