= E Sharp (band) =

Pakistani comedy rock band

- Origin: Karachi, Sindh, Pakistan
- Genres: Alternative rock, funk rock, indie rock, blues rock, comedy rock, pop rock,
- Years active: 2005–present
- Labels: Silent Roar; E Sharp
- Members: Ahmed Zawar; Anwaar Ahmed; Qumber Kazmi
- Past members: Zia Zaidi; Imran Saleem; Asher Minhas Damanwala; Rajil Anthony

E Sharp (Urdu: ای شارپ) is a rock band from Karachi, Sindh, Pakistan, that initially started as a cover band active in Karachi's underground music scene but later on started creating their own original work. The band's first two albums; Bahadur Yaar Jung (2015) and 600 Saal (2017)were nominated at the Lux Style Awards respectively. A bunch of their singles and music videos has mostly received positive reviews. Their third album Choti Khushiyan was released in 2020 and received positive reviews as well.

== History ==
=== 2005–2010 ===
E Sharp originally started with Ahmed Zawar on lead vocals and rhythm guitars and Anwaar Ahmed on lead guitars and backing vocals. The band was later joined by Qumber Kazmi on drums and Zia Zaidi on bass and backing vocals.

=== 2010–2015 ===
The band released a few of their singles on their social media platforms which included "Kya Main Kahoon", "Ek Aam Shehri", "Jannat", "IMF", "Kahani", "Bacchi Blues", "Chupkay Se Suno" and "Koi Toh" in 2011. They performed at different venues in Karachi as well.

The band released two more singles "Jiye Bhutto" and "Oye" in 2013. In 2014, the band started working on their debut album.

=== 2015–2018 ===
Their debut album Bahadur Yaar Jung was released in 2015 through multiple streaming platforms. It is also the only Pakistani album with 21 songs, and one of the first albums released through the streaming platform Patari.pk. The band then released a music video of "Kya Maine Socha" from their debut album.

In 2016, the band started working on their second album titled 600 Saal. The album was released in April 2017 on various streaming platforms along with two singles accompanied by music videos from the album titled "Superman" and "600 Saal".

E Sharp also participated in the second season of Pepsi Battle of the Bands in which they performed "600 Saal". Despite the positive comments from the judges, the band did not make it to the top 8 which received a lot of criticism, to which musician Ahsan Bari; who is associated with the show; replied that bands like Sikandar Ka Mandar and E Sharp "are beyond battles".

=== 2018–present ===
E Sharp made a second appearance in the fourth season of Pepsi Battle of the Bands. They came with a new line-up and performed the song The Anthem of Shabana. Their performance received highly positive reviews from the judge and they became the only band in the entire show to advance through the next round without the shortlisting process.

They were competitors in the fourth season of Pepsi Battle of the Bands and finished in third place sharing the position with Islamabad-based rock band Black Hour The decision to eliminate the band was heavily criticized both by critics and audiences. Maheen Sabeeh of The News International wrote regarding the band's elimination "You have to wonder what the judges were thinking. Black Hour and E Sharp certainly did play better, more so the latter one. Based on this performance alone (and the others they have delivered so far), it is a damn shame to see the unlikeliest candidates make it to the finals." Similarly, S.K Pakistan of Parhlo called E-Sharp's exit from the show "a shock."

E Sharp digitally released their third album Choti Khushiyan which was accompanied by a film of the same name featuring all of the band members on YouTube followed by many streaming platforms. Both the album and the film received positive reviews.

== Discography ==
=== Albums ===
As of 2020, E Sharp has released three albums. All tracks written by E Sharp, recorded in the E Sharp Studios, and released under the label Silent Roar Productions.

==== Bahadur Yaar Jung ====
The first album by E Sharp, titled Bahadur Yaar Jung, was released on 2 May 2015.

No.	Title	Length
1.	"Chorh De"	01:15
2.	"Is Shehar Mai"	03:35
3.	"Mai Banunga Bahadur"	03:17
4.	"Aray Is Se Kya Hoga"	01:44
5.	"Tum Kuch Nahe Karsaktay"	03:39
6.	"Kya Maine Socha"	04:53
7.	"Agar Hum Chahien"	03:14
8.	"Sachi Ki Jang"	05:24
9.	"Sooli"	08:40
10.	"Mai Banunga Bahadur" (Reprise)	03:10
11.	"Bahadur Yaar Jung"	05:58
12.	"Is Tarhan Kay Kamon Mai"	01:46
13.	"Sarkari Mulazim"	02:22
14.	"Sub Kuch Theek Hogaya Hai"	03:22
15.	"Pagal Hogaya Hun"	02:13
16.	"Ek Haseena"	04:30
17.	"Girnay Ko Hai Ye Deewar"	02:29
18.	"Sarmast"	01:02
19.	"Chehray"	04:00
20.	"Kya Main Hoon"	03:03
21.	"Samandar Kay Kinaray"	02:02
Total length:		1:11:38

==== 600 Saal ====
The second album, titled 600 Saal, was released on 21 April 2017. The album mostly received positive reviews.

No.	Title	Length
1.	"600 Saal"	04:42
2.	"Chalti Phirti Sazish"	03:42
3.	"Shabana 2"	03:55
4.	"Superman" (Explicit)	03:18
5.	"Gehri Baat"	05:05
6.	"Chorh Diya"	04:06
7.	"Saj Raha Hai"	05:33
8.	"600 Saal Guzray"	04:47
9.	"Yeh Arzu Hai Dil Mai"	04:48
10.	"Ashraf-ul-Makhlooqat"	04:48
11.	"Na Pak Zameen"	04:07
Total length:		48:51

==== Choti Khushiyan ====
The third album titled Choti Khushiyan was released on 31 May 2020. The album also features Bilal Ali, lead vocalist of the alternative rock band Kashmir and Playback singer Alycia Dias on their song Badshah. This album received positive reviews.

No.	Title	Length
1.	"Subah Ayi"	03:42
2.	"Oonchay Se Ghar"	03:34
3.	"Bhaag Re"	03:35
4.	"Doosri Dunya"	03:11
5.	"Dost"	02:28
6.	"Khuda Ki Basti"	03:46
7.	"Choti Khushiyan"	03:35
8.	"Badshah" (Featuring Bilal Ali and Alycia Dias)	04:49
Total length:		48:51

=== Singles ===
- "Ayesha (Dekho Toh Yahan)"
- "Bacchi Blues"
- "Jiye Bhutto"
- "The Anthem of Shabana"
- "Do Lafz"
- "IMF"
- "Oye"

== Music videos ==
- "Kya Maine Socha"
- "Superman"
- "600 Saal"
- "Oye"
- "Jiye Bhutto"
- "Chorh Diya"

== Band members ==
=== Current members ===
- Ahmed Zawar; lead vocals, rhythm guitars
- Anwaar Ahmed; lead guitars, backing vocals
- Qumber Kazmi; drums
- Rajil Anthony; bass

=== Former members ===
- Zia Zaidi; bass
- Imran Saleem; bass
- Asher Minhas Damanwala; guitars, keyboards, backing vocals

== Awards and nominations ==
Year	Nominee / work	Award	Result	Ref
Lux Style Awards
2016	Bahadur Yaar Jung	Album of the Year	Nominated	
2018	600 Saal	Album of the Year	Nominated	

== See also ==
- List of Pakistani music bands
- Music of Pakistan
