= List of Pakistani music bands =

Pakistan's music band scene was discovered in the 60s. The Panthers, a Karachi-based band founded in the late 60s, consisted of Norman Braganza (Lead Guitar and Vocals), Fasahat Husain Syed (Keyboard, Sitar and Tabla), Eric Fernandes (Bass Guitar) and Syed Ahsan Sajjad (Drums and Vocals). The Panthers recorded two albums: 'Folk Tunes of Pakistan on Electric Sitar and Western Instruments' and 'East Goes West,' both released by EMI Pakistan. The Panthers disbanded in the early 70s when one of the band members left the country to settle overseas after Pakistan's authoritarian regime gained momentum.

The rise of musical bands in Pakistan began in the 1980s when cassettes first came into Pakistan bringing in a wave of Western rock music. Western-influenced rock music began to feature in underground concerts all across the country. In the 1980s, rock bands Vital Signs and Strings rose in defiance of the authoritarian regime and gained immense popularity amongst the youth. Vital Signs is widely regarded as Pakistan's first and most successful pop-rock band. Their single "Dil Dil Pakistan" was voted the third most popular song of all time in a BBC World poll in 2003, and is also called Pakistan's "pop national anthem". Despite being active since the late 80s, Strings attained widespread popularity after the release of their second album in 1992. The band went on to sell over 25 million albums worldwide. Junoon, Aaroh, and Noori followed suit in the 1990s.

Junoon pioneered the genre of Sufi rock, combining the poetry of famous Sufi poets such as Rumi, Hafez, and Bulleh Shah with the hard rock band of Led Zeppelin and Santana and South Asian percussion such as the tabla. Junoon is one of Pakistan's and South Asia's most successful bands with over 30 million albums sold worldwide; The New York Times called Junoon "the U2 of Pakistan" and Q magazine dubbed them as "One of the biggest bands in the world". Junoon became the first rock band to perform at the United Nations General Assembly Hall and only the second Pakistani act to perform at a Nobel Peace Prize Concert.

The early 2000s saw the arrival of progressive metal, progressive rock, and psychedelic rock with bands such as Entity Paradigm and Mizraab. Mekaal Hasan Band, Call, Karavan, Jal, Roxen, Mizmaar, and Qayaas also exploded onto the music scene with different brands of rock including alternative and soft rock. The television series Pepsi Battle of the Bands was instrumental in launching Entity Paradigm, Aaroh, and the Mekaal Hasan Band, all of whom competed in the inaugural edition of the show in 2002.

The resumption of the Pepsi Battle of the Bands in 2017 after almost 15 years, heralded the resurgence of Pakistani rock with the rise of Kashmir band, Bayaan, and Badnaam.

Although the heavy metal genre began to rise in popularity after the 1997 general elections, Pakistani heavy metal music can be traced back to the new wave of British heavy metal of the 1980s and 1990s with bands such as Black Warrant, Final Cut, and Barbarians. In recent years, numerous heavy and black metal bands including Overload, Saturn, Saakin, Karakoram, Burq – The Band, Taarma, The Nuke, and Aag have amassed followings in this niche rock music in Pakistan.

In 1986, the Vital Signs (predominantly a pop band) released its first single "Do Pal Ka Jeevan", which became an ultimate success and the band built its reputation in Pakistan's underground music industry. The rock music bands and trios came to be perceived by many Pakistani fans and country's cultural observers as a "promising new era of cultural revival". Their enormous popularity significantly opened a new wave of music and a modern chapter in the history of Pakistan.

In the 1980s, rock bands including the Strings, The Barbarians, The Final Cut, Jupiters, Junoon, and Vital Signs gained a lot of public appraisal and popularity; the public opinion was generally positive and welcomed the bands for their uniqueness. NTM, launched a show titled Music Channel Charts to highlight new talent every week due to popular youth demand.

Vital Signs were followed by Junoon, Awaz, Strings, Karawan, and Jupiters, all of whom had exploded the pop, rock and heavy metal music genre in the country, bringing the significant shift of country's transformation into modernism during the 1990s. The Pakistani rock further matured itself and gained public appraisal with the arrival of American satellite television in the 1990s. The popular form of music quickly spread throughout the country and with that came the arrival of various rock bands in the 1990s. Early rock bands such as Vital Signs and Junoon are regarded as the pioneers of Pakistan's rock music. Other bands such as Strings began in the mid 1990s and during the late 1990s underground bands were becoming a norm in cities across Pakistan. In a short span of time, the Western-influenced rock bands gained enormous popularity and were generally welcomed by the public. The Music Channel Charts aired to NTM became the first pop/rock music entity that used to give ratings to pop/rock bands and singers. Music '89 was the first ever all pop/rock music stage-show to be aired on PTV.

Cities such as Karachi, Lahore and Islamabad witnessed an explosion of rock bands and concerts in 2000 as Pakistan began to liberalize under President Musharraf's "enlightened moderation" campaign. In 2002, a major shift in the rock music of Pakistan occurred with the arrival of the Pepsi Battle of the Bands, which saw bands like Aaroh, Mizraab, Entity Paradigm and Mekaal Hasan Band appear onto the scene. Finally, Pakistan saw good rock music, with respectable instrument playing.

Vital Signs emerged during a time in which Pakistan was embracing Islamization. With the rise of Vital Signs and later, Junoon and others, the rock music, exploded in the 1980s and 1990s, became a vehicle for expressing patriotic nationalist spirit in Pakistan. Undoubtedly, the rock music has been one major influential force which has truly kept the national spirits high amidst the prevailing social woes which had worsened in since the 1980s, such music included songs like "Dil Dil Pakistan", Jazba Junoon, Jaago and many more.

In 1980, such Western ideas were denounced in the country, and the film industry was deteriorating quick to compete with counterrevolution of Indian film industry. According to the editorial written in The Express Tribune in 2011, the "Vital Signs and Pakistan's ingenious rock music was the only "arsenal" the country had against India's encroaching entertainment industry."

Several popular bands, including EP, Call, and Noori, have been integral in revitalizing the rock culture in Pakistan.

After the successful emergence of Vital Signs in the 1980s and Junoon in the 1990s, the heavy metal music genre began to rise after the 1997 general elections. Black Warrant was one of the earliest heavy metal band that released its very first album in the public. The roots of Pakistani heavy metal music can be traced back to the new wave of British heavy metal when it was transferred in the late 1980s and early 1990s. In the 1980s, the bands Final Cut and Barbarians are considered the earliest Pakistani heavy metal bands. Although they were short-lived, they influenced many other musicians. Guitarist Salman Ahmad gained fame for his unique style of playing Sufi-style and neoclassical kinds of music in heavy metal form.

The second wave of heavy metal artists, comprising bands such as Dhun, which was Fawad Baloch's more conventional metal project, Blackhour, Ehl-e-Rock, Inferner, and Black Warrant, still continues to promote the genre. The most notable and productive work on the heavy metal genre was bestowed and carried out by Mizraab, whose Panchi album was an ultimate success in this genre. Guitarist Faraz Anwar of Mizraab's solo instrumental work is widely noticed by the public and news channels dubbed Anwar as "Pakistan's master of progressive-metal rock." In recent studies and reports conducted by CNN, heavy metal is one of Pakistan's most popular genres of music, and country's radio FMs broadcast the music each week. Since 2004, the economic liberalisation programmes of Prime minister Shaukat Aziz which helped open the new Pakistan TV and several music video channels, have triggered the underground heavy metal movements in cities such as Karachi, Lahore and Islamabad.

Although Mizraab, a band led by Faraz Anwar that is considered to be Pakistan's first progressive metal band, have also played a significant role in promoting the growth of metal music in Pakistan. Furthermore, bands such as Jehangir Aziz Hayat, Takatak, Messiah and Foreskin are examples of significant metal bands that have surfaced in the past five years.

In 2002, Atif Aslam and Goher Mumtaz formed rock band Jal. The band released Aadat and it became a major hit in South Asia. It was recreated many times. It was also used in the 2005 Hollywood film Man Push Cart. However, Atif left the band and Farhan Saeed joined the band.

In 2003 Saif Samjo formed a Sufi rock band named “The Sketches”. Which is still working on his way.Jogi, a song by Pakistani sufi-rock band The Sketches has been nominated for Best Song in the World Beat category at the New Mexico Music Awards. Jogi is the first single from the forthcoming full-length album of The Sketches, the track was recorded in Pakistan and USA and features a guest appearance by Grammy Award winning harmonica player John Popper and is produced by Jono Manson.

In Pepsi Battle of Bands, four bands rose to popularity. The first band is Aaroh formed in 1998 in Karachi is an alternative rock band. The name was given to it by Shoaib Mansoor. Kamran Khan was the founder of the band. It gained fame from Pepsi Battle of Bands by performing songs like Sawaal, Aag Ki Tarhan. It released two studio albums in 2003 and 2013 respectively. Aaroh released 'Jeet' in February 2018, a tribute to the Pakistan Super League.

The second band that gained fame was an alternative metal band 'Entity Paradigm' that was formed in 2000 in Lahore by Zulfiqar Jabbar Khan. In the Pakistani music industry, it's one of the pioneering mainstream rock bands. It disbanded in 2007 but reunited in 2009.

Kashmir was the third band in this series, The 2012 formed alternative rock band from Karachi, and also the winner of Pepsi Battle of Bands Season 2. The band has also won the Lux Style Award in 2017 for Best Emerging Talent (Music) 2017 for the song 'Kaaghaz Ka Jahaaz'. Badnaam is the last band of the series. It was formed in 2009 in Lahore. The name of the Sufi band was inspired from Bulleh Shah's poetry.Hassan & Roshaan is one of the new emerging duo/band with there major hit of the song Doobne de

This is a list of music bands in Pakistan. The list contains bands with their origin year (or period for past bands), origin city, genres, labels, and the present and old members arranged alphabetically.

== Current bands ==
| Band | Image | Origin year | Origin city | Genre(s) | Label(s) | Members | Refs |
|---|---|---|---|---|---|---|---|
| Aaroh | — | 1998 | Karachi | Alternative rock, Pop rock, Power pop | Sadaf Stereo, Sangeet Records, The Musik Records, Independent | Farooq Ahmad, Khalid Khan, Jason Anthony, Haider Hashimi, Nabeel Nihal Chishty, Kamran Khan, Adnan Hussain, Rizwan Anwar | |
| Badnaam | | 2009 | Lahore | Grunge, Sufi rock | PepsiCo Pakistan | Ahmed Jilani, Lala Ahsan, Raheem Shahbaz Sunny | |
| Bayaan | — | 2014 | Lahore | Alternative, progressive, folk, pop, rock | Rearts Records | Asfar Hussain, Shahrukh Aslam, Muqeet Shahzad, Mansoor Lashari, Haider Abbas | |
| Beygairat Brigade | — | 2011 | Lahore | Rock music | Curosity | Ali Aftab Saeed, Daniyal Malik, Hamza Malik | |
| Call | — | 1994 | Lahore | Rock music | Sadaf Stereo, Fire Records | Junaid Khan, Zulfiqar Jabbar Khan, Sultan Raja, Waqar Khan, Omer Pervaiz, Danish Jabbar Khan, Nadeem, Sunny, Usman Nasir, Shahzad Hameed, Khurram Jabbar Khan | |
| Entity Paradigm | Entity Paradigm performing | 2000 | Lahore | Progressive metal, Heavy meral, Alternative metal, Nu metal, Rapcore | Lips music, Independent, Rearts Records | Ahmed Ali Butt, Fawad Khan, Zulfiqar Jabbar Khan, Sajjad Ali, Hassaan Khalid, Salman Albert, Abid Khan, Waqar Ahmed Khan | |
| Esta Livio | Esta Livio members | 2006 | Lahore | Progressive rock, Alternative rock | Sadaf Stereo | Hasan Shahid, Hamza Maqsood, Sheraz Arif, Rehan Akhtar | |
| E Sharp | — | 2005 | Karachi | Alternative rock, Indie rock, Funk rock, Blues rock, Comedy rock, Pop rock | Silent roar, E Sharp | Ahmed Zawar, Anwaar Ahmed, Qumber Kazmi, Asher Minhas Damanwala, Rajil Anthony, Zia Zaidi, Imran Saleem | |
| Furqan and Imran | Furqan and Imran band members | 2013 | Karachi | Pop, rock, Classical | Flash and Bang Productions | Imran Butt, Furqan Tunio, Anas Imtiaz | |
| Fuzön | Fuzön band member Shallum performing | 2001 | Karachi | Pop, Pop rock | Sound Master, The Musik Records | Imran Momina, Khurram Iqbal, Shallum Asher Xavier, Rameez Mukhtar, Shafqat Amanat Ali | |
| Ismail and Junaid | — | 2010 | Peshawar | Pashto, Alternative folk, Sufi | Shoaib Anwar | Ismail Khan, Junaid Javed | |
| Jal | | 2002 | Lahore | Pop, Pop rock, Alternative rock | Sadaf Stereo, Fire Records (Pakistan), Tips Music, Universal Music | Goher Mumtaz, Ali Khan, Amir Azhar, Salman Albert, Atif Aslam, Farhan Saeed, Aamir Sheraz, Omer Nadeem | |
| Junoon | Junoon band performing | 1990 | Lahore | Sufi rock, Psychedelic rock, Hard rock, Heavy metal | Sadaf Stereo, EMI Records, Lips Music, Universal Music | Ali Azmat, Salman Ahmad, Brian O'Connel, Taylor Simpson, Nusrat Hussain | |
| Justin Bibis | — | 2015 | Lahore | Pop music | Coke Studio | Saania, Muqaddas Tabaydar | |
| Karavan | Karavan band performing | 1997 | Karachi | Hard rock, Heavy metal | VCI Records, Sound Master, ARY Musik Records, Karavan Catalog Ltd | Asad Ahmed, Sameer Ahmed, Allan Smith, Tanseer Ahmed Daar, Najam Sheraz | |
| Kashmir | — | 2012 | Karachi | Alternative rock, Indie rock | PepsiCo Pakistan, Rearts Records | Bilal Ali, Vais Khan, Usman Siddique, Ali Raza, Zair Zaki, Shane J. Anthony | |
| Khumariyaan | — | 2009 | Peshawar | Pop, Folk, Ethnic | Fire Records | Aamer Shafiq, Farhan Bogra, Shiraz Khan, Sparlay Rawail | |
| Laal | Laal band performing | 2008 | Lahore | Sufi rock, Progressive rock, Alternative rock | Fire Records, Times Music India | Taimur Rahman, Mahvash Waqar, Haider Rahman, Shahram Azhar | |
| Gurus Trilogy | | 2006 | Karachi | Pop Rock, Fusion, Multi-Genre | Fire Records, Universal Music India | Glenn Silverious John, Mohsin Allahditta, Sayyam Rana | |
| Mekaal Hasan Band | Meekal Hasan Band performing | 2000 | Lahore | Alternative rock, Sufi rock, Jazz | EMI Records, MHB Music, Sadaf Stereo | Mekaal Hasan, Mohammad Ahsan Papu, Sharmistha Chatterjee, Sheldon D'Silva, Gino Banks, Agha Ibrahim Akram, Amir Azhar, Asad Abbas, Riaz Ali Khan, Sameer Ahmed, Javed Bashir, Kami Paul | |
| Mizmaar | | 2000 | Karachi | Rock, Indie rock, Indie pop, Pop-rock, Fusion | Dreamstation Productions, Universal Music | Kashan Admani, Alfred D'Mello | |
| Mizraab | Mizraab band | 1997 | Karachi | Progressive rock, Progressive metal, Classical rock | Sound Master, Sadaf Stereo | Muhammad Muzammil, Faraz Anwar, Irfan Ahmad, Ferdinand Goveas | |
| Naseer & Shahab | — | 2010 | Khyber Pakhtunkhawa | Soft rock, Alternative rock | Rearts Records | Naseer Afridi, Shahab Qamat | |
| Noori | Noori band performing | 1996 | Lahore | Alternative rock, Pop rock, Sufi rock | Sadaf Stereo, BIY Records | Ali Noor, Ali Hamza, Kami Paul, Salman Albert, Farhad Humayun, Murtaza Jaffar, Muhammad Ali Jafri, Louis J. Pinto (aka Gumby) | |
| Overload | — | 2003 | Lahore | Instrumental rock, Experimental rock, Classical music, Psychedelic rock, fusion | BMN Records, Riot Records, Universal Music | Farhan Humayun, Aziz Ibrahim, Nasir Sain, Pappu Sain, Jhura Sain, Hassan Mohyeddin, Mahmood Rahman, Meesha Shafi | |
| Raeth | — | 2006 | Karachi | Sufi rock | Universal Music, Fire Records, T-Series | Wajhi Farooqi, Sunny Ghamsham, Mustafa Asad, Hasan Farabi | |
| Rage | — | 1986 | Lahore | Pop, rock | Sadaf Stereo, Lips Records, Gladiator Records | Salman Haidery, Christopher, Amir Ajmal, Murad Hassan, Ahmer Kenneth, Ali Raza, Haseeb Gora, Amir Abbas | |
| Rizwan-Muazzam | — | 1990 | Lahore | Qawwal | Real World Records, Real World Studios, Narada Productions | Rizwan, Muazzam | |
| Rushk | — | 2000 | Karachi | Rock, Jazz, Funk rock, R&B, Gothic rock, Dark rock | Sound Master, Independent | Tara Mahmood, Ziyaad Gulzar, Sikandar Mufti, Ali Jafri, Uns Mufti, Nazia Zuberi | |
| Sabri Brothers | Sabri Brothers | 1956 | Kalyana | Qawwali | EMI Records, Arion, Auvidis, UNESCO, Real World, Piranha, Oriental Star Agencies, Xenophile, Sirocco, Nonesuch | Mehmood Ghaznavi Sabri, Ghulam Farid Sabri, Kamal Ahmed Khan Sabri, Maqbool Ahmed Sabri, Amjad Fareed Sabri | |
| Sajid & Zeeshan | — | 2003 | Peshawar | Electronica, Alternative rock, Ambient | EMI Records | Sajid Ghafoor, Zeeshan Parwez | |
| Saturn | — | 2003 | Islamabad | Progressive rock, Progressive metal, Groove metal | Independent, Bandcamp, Tunecore | Shahbaz Zaidi, Salman Zaidi, Aashir, Shahbaz Asad, Usman, Rawal Shadab, Ahamad | |
| Sikandar Ka Mandar | — | 2010 | Karachi | Indie music | Silent Roar Productions, 4inabillion Records, Elements Media | Nadir Shahzad Khan, Ali Suhail, Daud Ramay, Zahra Paracha | |
| Strings | Strings band performing | 1988 | Karachi | Pop rock | EMI Records, Fire Records, Sony BMG | Faisal Kapadia, Bilal Maqsood, Adeel Ali, Haider Ali, Aahad Nayani, Bradley D' Souza, Rafiq Wazir Ali, Kareem Bashir Bhoy, Shakir Khan | |
| Topi Drama | — | 2010 | Lahore | Rock | Independent | Sohail Qureshi, Arafat Mazhar, Kenny Zeerick | |
| The Kominas | The Kominas band members performing | 2004 | Worcester, Massachusetts, United States | Punk rock, Funck rock, Taqwacore, Alternative rock | Independent | Basim Usmani, Shahjehan Khan, Karna Ray, Hassan Ali Malik, Arjun Ray, Imran Ali Malik, Abdullah Saeed | |
| The Sketches | — | 2003 | Jamshoro | Sufi rock, Psychedelic rock, Hard rock, Alternative rock | Lahooti Records, Fire Records, Rearts Records | Saif Samejo, Nomi Ali, Owais Shaikh, Roshan Sharma, Naeem Shah | |
| Aag (band) | — | 2005 | Lahore | Alternative/Pop-Rock/Synth band | Velo Sound Station | Haroon Sheikh, Usman Sheikh | |

== Past bands ==
| Band | Image | Period | Origin city | Genre(s) | Label(s) | Members | Refs |
|---|---|---|---|---|---|---|---|
| Atish Raj | — | 1994–2007 | Karachi | Industrial rock, Progressive rock, Art rock | Oriental Star Agencies | Nadeem F. Paracha, Rome K, Kashif Caan, Zeeshan Parwez | |
| Aunty Disco Project | Aunty Disco Project band performing | 2006–2011 | Karachi | Indie rock, Indie pop, Pop rock, Alternative rock | Independent | Omar Bilal Akhtar, Yasir Qureshi, Ali Alam, Rahail Siddiqui, Giles Goveas | |
| Awaz | — | 1992–2000 | Karachi | Pop rock | EMI Records, BMG Records, Lips Music Records | Haroon, Faakhir Mehmood, Asad Ahmed | |
| Jupiters | — | 1980–1995 | Lahore | Pop rock | Oriental Star Agencies, EMI Pakistan, Thar Production | Ali Azmat, Sahir Ali Bagga, Shahzad Ahmed, Bilal Hafeez, Irfan Kiani, Amir Munawar, Shakir Awan, Tahir Saqi, Kanan Rashid, Danny Williams, Ajay | |
| Nazia and Zoheb | - | 1980–1992 | Karachi | Pop music, Pakistani pop, Indie pop | EMI Records | Nazia Hassan, Zoheb Hassan | |
| Qayaas | Qayaas band performing | 2008–2016 | Islamabad | Progressive rock, Progressive metal, Alternative rock | BIY Records | Umair Jaswal, Khurram Waqar, Rahail Siddiqui, Asfendyar Ahmad, Sarmad Abdul Ghafoor, Salman "Fifu" Rafique | |
| Roxen | — | 2004–2018 | Lahore | Alternative rock, Pop rock | T-Series, Sony BMG, Universal Music India, Saregama, Zee Music, Fire Records | Mustafa Zahid, Haider Halim, Shahan Khan, Jawad (Jodi), Omar Halim | |
| The Milestones | | 1990–1996 | Karachi | Pop rock | Visible Changes, Sound Master | Ziyyad Gulzar, Ali Tim, Candy Pereira | |
| Vital Signs | — | 1983–2013 | Rawalpindi | Pop rock, Hard rock, Progressive rock | EMI Pakistan, VCI Records, PTV Studios, Pepsi Pakistan Inc. | Junaid Jamshed, Rohail Hyatt, Shahzad Hassan, Nusrat Hussain, Salman Ahmad, Rizwan-ul-Haq, Aamir Zaki | |
| Zeb and Haniya | — | 2007–2014 | Kohat | Pop rock, Alternative rock, Sufi rock, Folk rock, Classical music, Blues | Fire Records, True Brew Records | Zebunnisa Bangash, Haniya Aslam | |
| Above | — | 2000–2010 | Karachi | Pop rock, Metal, Classic Rock, Rock, Alternative Rock, Blues | Independent | Shoaib Khan, Ali Abbas Alavi, Humayun Ghias, Tabraiz Ghazi, Lenny Massey | |

== See also ==
- Music of Asia
- Music of Pakistan
- Culture of Pakistan
- Pakistani popular music
- List of Pakistani musicians
- List of Pakistani pop singers
- List of Pakistani ghazal singers
- List of Pakistani qawwali singers
- Sufi rock
- Filmi pop
- National Academy of Performing Arts
