= Ali Zafar vs. Meesha Shafi =

2018–onwards Pakistani harassment and defamation cases

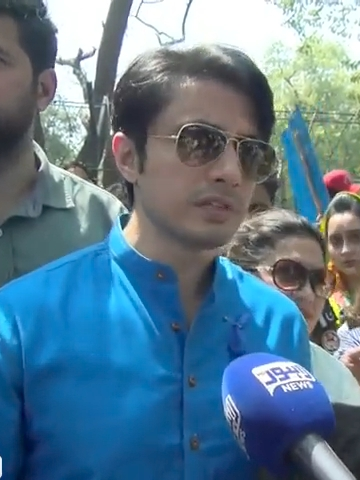
Ali Zafar

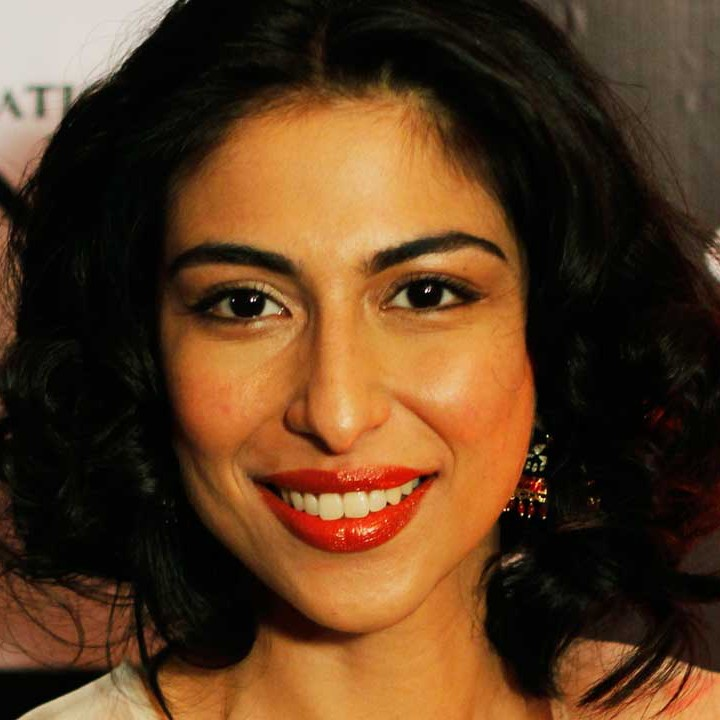
Meesha Shafi

Ali Zafar and Meesha Shafi (Note: Meesha Shafi's legal name is Meera Shafi. (Note: Case file and details on website) (Note: CP No. 1795/2022 and PLD 2023 SC 211)) are Pakistani singers who had been colleagues and friends for several years. On 19 April 2018, Shafi publicly accused Zafar of sexual harassment. Zafar, as plaintiff, denied and subsequently filed a civil defamation suit against Shafi, as defendant. More women came in against Zafar and supported Shafi, highlighting the MeToo movement in Pakistan. Reported as a "high-profile" case, a trial court in Lahore ruled the defamation case in Zafar's favour after about eight years, on 31 March 2026; however, Shafi challenged the verdict in the Lahore High Court.

Meanwhile, other legal cases were also filed, including two defamation suits in counterclaim against Zafar; one by Shafi and the other by Leena Ghani. Furthermore, appeals were submitted by Shafi before the Supreme Court of Pakistan against dismissal of her workplace harassment complaint, and against the cybercrime complaint by Zafar with the Federal Investigation Agency (FIA), which involves other persons with Shafi who had also voiced against Zafar; including Ghani, Iffat Omar, and Ali Gul Pir.

== Background ==
Ali Zafar and Meesha Shafi have known each other for several years, and both are graduates of the National College of Arts (NCA), Lahore. They have together attended a number of private occasions and public entertainment events, including Zafar's wife's birthday party and the 15th Lux Style Awards, both in 2016. Besides sharing pictures together on social media, Shafi was also featured in the music videos for Zafar's songs "Chal Dil Mere" in 2003 and "Urain Ge" in 2015. (Note: Biographies are extracted from The Express Tribune, Dawn, Daily Jang, and Al Jazeera.)

Both had individually endorsed some of the multinational brands in Pakistan, including Mobilink, Pepsi, and Lipton, and had also previously individually appeared in Coke Studio Pakistan's episodes. Shafi was an advocate for a 2016 campaign by the UN Women Pakistan as well, while Zafar was preparing his film Teefa in Trouble. (Note: Pieces of information over the years are gathered from The Express Tribune, Dawn, and The News.) In 2017, Shafi was a judge at Pepsi Battle of the Bands, and Zafar was signed to join her in 2018. (Note: Claims and pieces of information are extracted from Dawn, The Nation, and The News.)

== Allegations ==
On 19 April 2018, Shafi accused Zafar on Twitter of "sexual harassment of a physical nature" on "more than one occasion", and highlighted the MeToo movement. Zafar "categorically" denied the allegation and stated that he would take the matter to court rather than contest it on social media.

Journalist Hamna Zubair published Shafi's interview on Dawn Images minutes after her tweet. Two days later, another interview with Shafi was published in The News Instep Today in which she claimed because it is "easier" to tell "to move on", she was feeling more "difficult" to "stay silent". Zafar's interview was also published in The News the same day, in which he said that Shafi was his "family friend", and that the MeToo movement was used against him without any proof which would "tarnish" the country's image.

On 25 April, Zafar's legal team sent a notice to Shafi demanding an apology and removal of her accusations. However, on 12 May, Shafi's legal team issued a reply notice instead, asking Zafar for an apology for his "predatory behaviour". Zafar was represented by his father-in-law, Advocate Ali Sibtain Fazli.

On a Geo News program, Zafar claimed that he was targeted using a "social media campaign" as well as "fake accounts" on social media, and the companies were called on to terminate his contracts thus to end his career. He claimed that he started a hashtag #FaceTheCourtMeeshaShafi after remaining silent for one year. On another Geo News program, Shafi claimed to have attempted a private resolution with Zafar's representatives and stated that she did not wish to work with him, but that Zafar insisted she visit him due to family ties. She claimed to have remained silent for four months before her tweet, and expressed her hope that a witness would eventually come forward.

== Impact and reactions ==
UN Women Pakistan voiced its support towards the MeToo movement without naming Shafi, though Shafi endorsed the statement. Soon afterwards, other women came forward in her support, and made statements against Zafar that they had also experienced harassment, including Leena Ghani, Humna Raza, and Maham Javaid. Shafi temporarily deactivated her social media handles following the cyberbullying and threats she was receiving. It was rumoured that she fled Canada, though she clarified she already became a permanent resident there in 2016. (Note: Claims and pieces of information are extracted from Business Recorder, Dawn, The Express Tribune, and the journalists Sadia Khatri and Sameen Khan.)

Media outlets began reporting it as a "high-profile" case in Pakistan. (Note: Claim is extracted from publications over the years, including Al Jazeera, Dawn, Asia Times, The Guardian, The Express Tribune, and Daily Jang.) M. A. Niazi of The Nation reviewed that seemingly Zafar was "Harvey Weinstein", however, Niazi did not "want to denigrate" Shafi. In May 2018, the Pakistan Electronic Media Regulatory Authority (PEMRA) issued a notice that journalist Orya Maqbool Jan had made derogatory remarks against Shafi while commenting on the movement.

Zafar had to step down from Pepsi Battle of the Bands, as the recording was originally scheduled to start just a day after Shafi's tweet. He was set to replace Atif Aslam from the previous season as a co-judge with Shafi and Fawad Khan, however, after a few days, Strings members Bilal Maqsood and Faisal Kapadia replaced him. Some personnel within the Pakistan Cricket Board and the Pakistan Super League also resisted playing Zafar's songs, despite popularity of his 2017 anthem, "Ab Khel Jamay Ga". In 2024, after a six-year gap, the PSL re-hired him for another anthem. (Note: Claims and pieces of information are extracted from Business Recorder, Geo News, Dawn, Cricket Pakistan by Express, and The Express Tribune.)

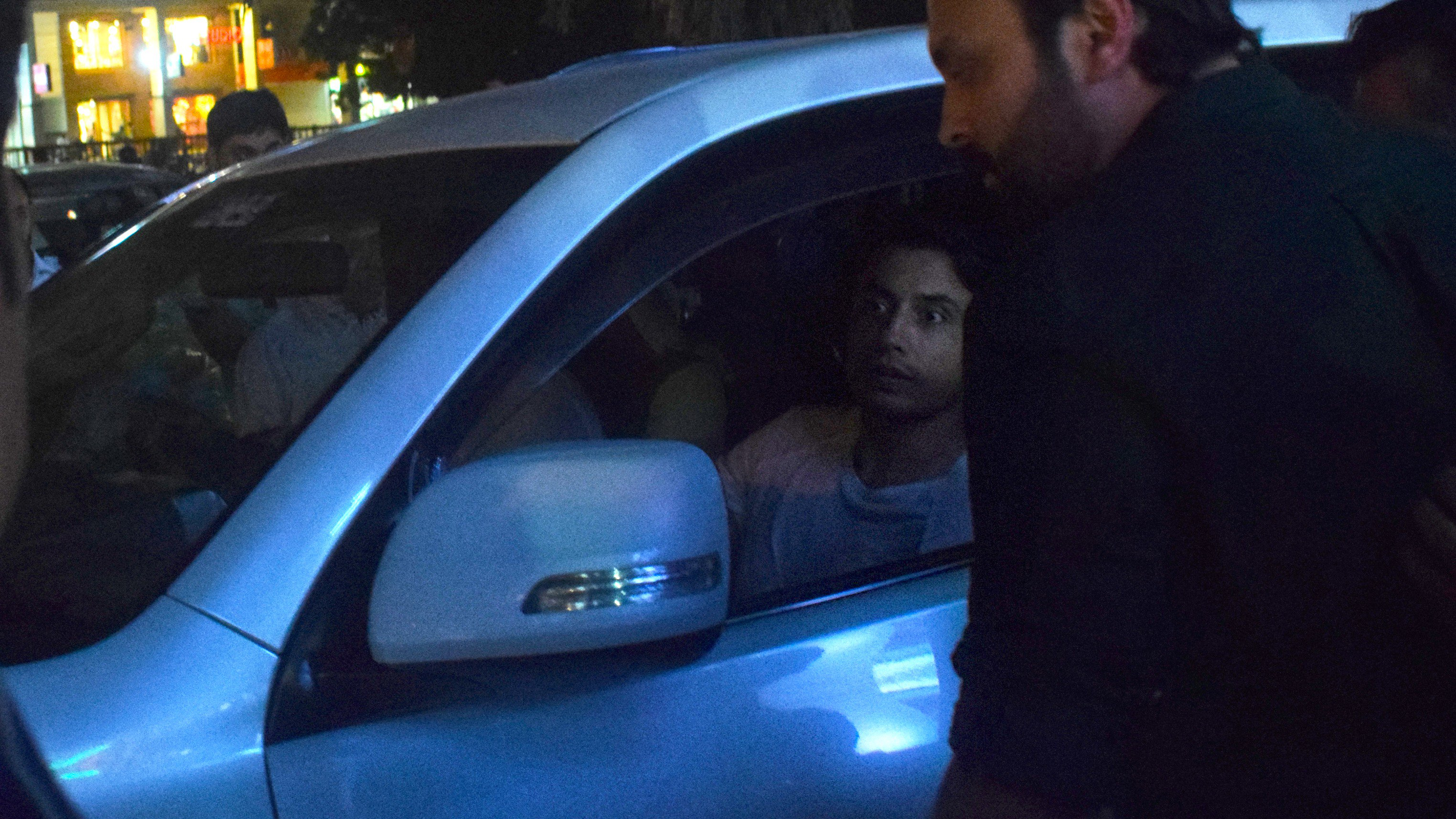
Zafar facing a protest in Karachi, July 2018

In July 2018, the promotional events and screening of Teefa in Trouble faced protests in Karachi and Lahore, and the activists called for a boycott of the film using slogans like "Boycott Ali Zafar", "Boycott Teefa in Trouble", and "Teefa is Trouble". Journalist Hamna Zubair again published an article on Dawn Images, claiming she was not invited to be at the event, yet she decided to visit. (Note: Claims and pieces of information are extracted from Dawn, Business Recorder, Gulf News, Daily Pakistan, BBC Urdu, and VOA Urdu.) Dawn Images further reported that an internal conversation by employees at Patari led to remove the film's soundtrack from their website, and that they had falsely accused Zafar's team of demoting a song featuring Shafi's brother, Faris Shafi.

In April 2019, several artists withdrew their nominations for the 18th Lux Style Awards, including Shafi, who was nominated under the category of Best Song, and protested the nominations for Zafar's film including Best Film Actor. Consequently, the show's organizers stated that they respected both the decisions of the awards jury and the legal proceedings. (Note: Criticism and controversy is extracted from Business Recorder, Dawn, and Samaa TV.) Shafi also criticized the 2021 Hum Style Awards for having Zafar as host and called on it not to nominate her. In 2023, however, Shafi was awarded Most Stylish Musician at the 22nd Lux Style Awards, an event Zafar attended and performed at.

In 2019, a tweet and a subsequent diss track by Ali Gul Pir "Karley Jo Karna Hai" were interpreted as mocking Zafar by using wordplay on specific terms from his career, including "Channo", Teefa, "Rockstar", etc. (Note: Claims are extracted from Business Recorder, Dawn, Geo News, Aaj TV, Sunday E-Magazine, and The News.) Iffat Omar, who maintained her support for Shafi as a witness against Zafar despite having known both of their families, encountered Zafar in February 2023 on Twitter over claims of false reporting in media, and claimed that no foreign funding was involved. (Note: Claims and pieces of information are extracted from Geo News, Al Jazeera, 24 Digital, The Express Tribune, Dawn, and Business Recorder.)

In March 2021, VOA Urdu reported that Shafi's legal team denied the rumours that were spread by Indian media claiming Shafi was sentenced to three years' imprisonment; this happened after the British tabloid Daily Mail misquoted the American newspaper The Wall Street Journal. In December 2021, Shafi filed a defamation case in a UK High Court against a local television network, which, in a December 2020 program, had accused Shafi of not obeying the court orders in Zafar's defamation suit and used graphics to mock her. The court ruled in Shafi's favour in December 2023, finding the broadcast defamatory; however, in June 2025, the network issued an apology as part of a settlement outside court.

In June 2022, The Express Tribune reported that social media users in Pakistan compared the case of Zafar vs. Shafi with that of Depp v. Heard. While Zafar expressed his support towards Johnny Depp who had won the trial, Shafi however, shown her support for Amber Heard. Khadija Muzaffar wrote in The Friday Times that "what happened to Depp" was similar to the Zafar's case in view of "Pakistani men", and "if a woman is to retaliate", she is "deemed unworthy of being a victim" like Shafi. While Shafi claimed she had "felt silenced" when she had "the courage" to use her voice, in the aftermath of fighting the legal battle, Zafar maintained his stance with "innocent until proven guilty".

== Legal proceedings ==
=== Zafar's defamation suit ===
Ali Zafar vs. Meesha Shafi
- Court: Lahore sessions court
- Full case name: Ali Zafar's Suit for Damages, of Rs. 100 crore under the Defamation Ordinance, 2002, vs. Meera Shafi
- Started: 23 June 2018
- Decided: 31 March 2026
- Verdict: Shafi was found liable in all matters of defamation raised by Zafar, and shall pay Rs. 50 lakh in damages (reduced from Rs. 100 crore)

Court membership
- Judge sitting: Asif Hayat (verdict)

==== June 2018 – September 2019: Zafar's examination ====
On 23 June 2018, Ali Zafar filed a civil defamation suit of Rs. 100 crore (Note: US$1 was equivalent to approx. Rs. 121.6 on 23 June 2018, and to approx. Rs. 279 on 31 March 2026.) against Shafi under the Defamation Ordinance 2002, claiming that Shafi had caused injury to his "reputation, goodwill, livelihood" through what he called "false, slanderous and defamatory" allegations and a "malicious campaign". Zafar requested a restraining order; however, Shafi's legal team denied receiving it and claimed that Shafi was not yet summoned. On 24 January 2019, the court granted the restraining order, and forbade Shafi from making any negative statement towards him on any platform.

Rizwan Raees, a public relations company representative, testified that Zafar and Pepsi were individually being blackmailed by Shafi in 2018 to step away from each other, and at that time, she had only shared one incident of feeling harassment during a party at Zafar's in-laws in 2015. Contradictions were observed by Zafar's legal team in Shafi's claims when she had later accused Zafar of two incidents in an interview, and then of three incidents while filing her case; second incident in March 2016 at Zafar's wife's birthday party, and third incident in December 2017 at a jamming session at Zafar's studio. Upon inquiring about the 2015 incident, Zafar commented that Shafi continued to meet and that her husband had once worked with him afterwards. Upon showing his picture with Shafi from the March 2016 incident, Zafar argued that he thought she had no problem with putting a hand on her back for a photo, that she had posted the picture herself, and that he did not have the intention she alleged.

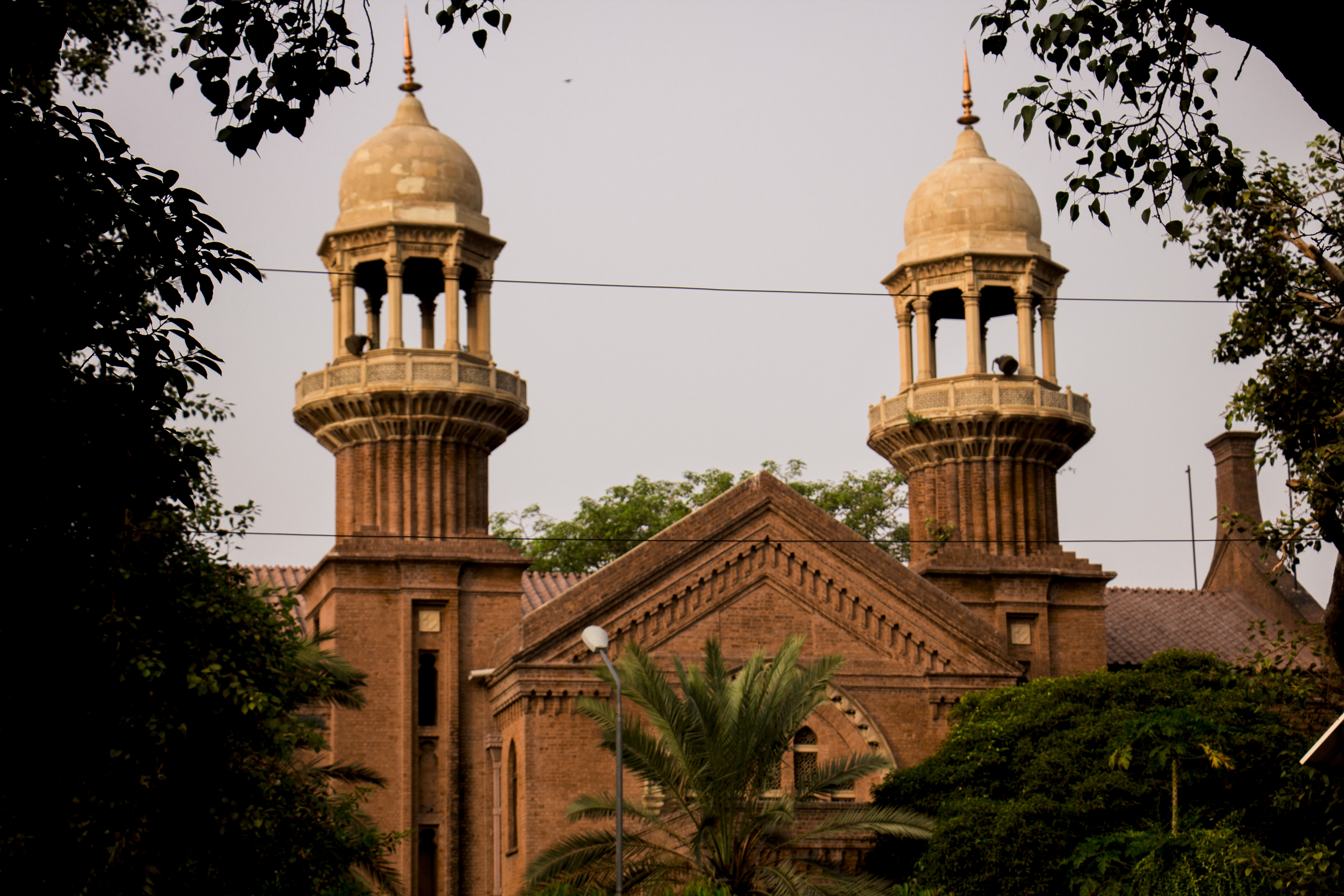
Lahore High Court

Supreme Court of Pakistan, Islamabad

Multiple appeals related to the Zafar vs. Shafi case were filed at the Lahore High Court and the Supreme Court of Pakistan.

Earlier in April 2019, the court fined Shafi Rs. 10,000, stating that Shafi's legal team had not appeared and was observing further extension. They tried appealing to have permission to cross-examine the witnesses together instead of bringing them separately to avoid "undue favour to the plaintiff", which was rejected by the Lahore High Court but was later granted by the Supreme Court on 14 May 2019. By 30 May 2019, backing vocalists Aqsa Ali and Kinza Muneer, and musicians Asad Ahmed, Baqir Abbas, Joshua Keith, Kashif Chaman, Muhammad Ali, Muhammad Taqi, and Qaisar Zain, denied Shafi's allegation and testified as eyewitnesses from the December 2017 incident that Zafar and Shafi hugged and greeted each other but maintained a distance while performing. Zafar presented a video as evidence, and claimed that Shafi had originally enjoyed "jamming and performing" and appreciated his "kind words" through a WhatsApp message. Sara Rehman, a common friend, later testified as another eyewitness that Shafi met Zafar at a party in February 2018.

Reportedly, a criminal charge petition for document forgery in March 2019, and a contempt of court petition for violation of the restraining order in September 2019, were also filed against Shafi.

==== November 2019 – March 2026: Shafi's examination ====
The court summoned witnesses from Shafi's side, which included her manager and guitarist Syed Farhan Ali, her friends and colleagues Leena Ghani and Iffat Omar, and her husband and musician Mahmood Rahman. Also, her mother Saba Hameed filed to become her power of attorney. During the cross-examination sessions over the years, they testified that Shafi had told them about the harassment incident, but no one physically witnessed it. For the March 2016 incident, Shafi admitted posting a picture with Zafar on her social media. For the December 2017 incident, she claimed she sent an appraisal WhatsApp message as a courtesy gesture. However, Shafi clarified that she felt harassment even though she was not an eyewitness to the incident. Saba Hameed claimed that Shafi was not professionally jealous of Zafar, while Shafi denied Zafar's reputational and financial loss by stating the commercial success for his film as well as admitting his government-level recognitions. (Note: Claims and pieces of information over the years are extracted from The Express Tribune, Geo News, Pakistan Today, 24 Digital, Dawn, and The Nation.)

Post-COVID-19 pandemic in Pakistan, arguments were raised that if Shafi, who was residing in Canada, could visit Pakistan to record songs for Coke Studio 2020, or visit Dubai to attend an event, then she could also appear before the court because the travel restriction had been lifted. In March 2021, Shafi's legal team filed an application at the sessions court, and later at the Supreme Court, requesting that her cross-examinations be recorded online instead of requiring her physical appearance in the court; the court ruled in favour of the request on 21 November 2022. In response, Zafar claimed to file an appeal against the ruling, and offered to bear Shafi's travel expenses. He further also argued that Shafi has filed a number of counter-appeals to buy some time and delay the proceedings. (Note: Claims and pieces of information over the years are extracted from The Express Tribune, Gulf News, Dawn, The News, a thread of Ali Zafar's tweets, and the public record of court files.)

Syed Farhan Ali, while affirming that Zafar could not continue endorsing any multinational brand, testified that Shafi's work also had suffered in the aftermath of the legal battle. Shafi also denied depriving Zafar's endorsements. She was also confronted with the social media posts by two of her ex-colleagues, who respectively claimed that Shafi is capable to "blackmail and malign" one's reputation and spread "malicious rumours", which she respectively disagreed with. (Note: Claims and pieces of information over the years are extracted from The Express Tribune, and Dawn.)

Iffat Omar was also questioned about why she supported a woman in this case but had supported men in movements against Omair Rana, Yousaf Raza Gillani, and Rehman Malik. Leena Ghani was also questioned about her support for Aurat March. She was confronted with her pictures with Zafar; she responded the pictures were older than when she felt harassed in June 2014, and that she had distanced herself from him since then; however, she admitted chatting with him on Facebook in 2016. She further testified that her sister, being an independent woman, continued working with Zafar.

Journalist Hamna Zubair also testified as Shafi's witness that she had not known Shafi in person prior to her private report in April 2018, though she waited to publish on Dawn Images until Shafi herself tweeted the allegation. Zubair claimed she tried contacting Zafar, but published it as breaking news without waiting for his rebuttal, though she clarified that his response was added later. She further admitted to misreporting the screening event of Zafar's film, though she clarified she was not among the protesters. (Note: Claims and pieces of information are extracted from Dawn, 24 Digital, City42 News, and Daily Pakistan.)

In January 2026, the High Court rejected Shafi's appeal to withdraw the restraining order against her. (Note: Information is extracted from Writ Petition No.19774 of 2019 by the Lahore High Court, as presented in Dawn, The Express Tribune, and Geo News.) In March 2026, the hearings from both sides were concluded. Saba Hameed appealed to the court on Shafi's behalf to dismiss the case.

=== Cybercrime complaint ===
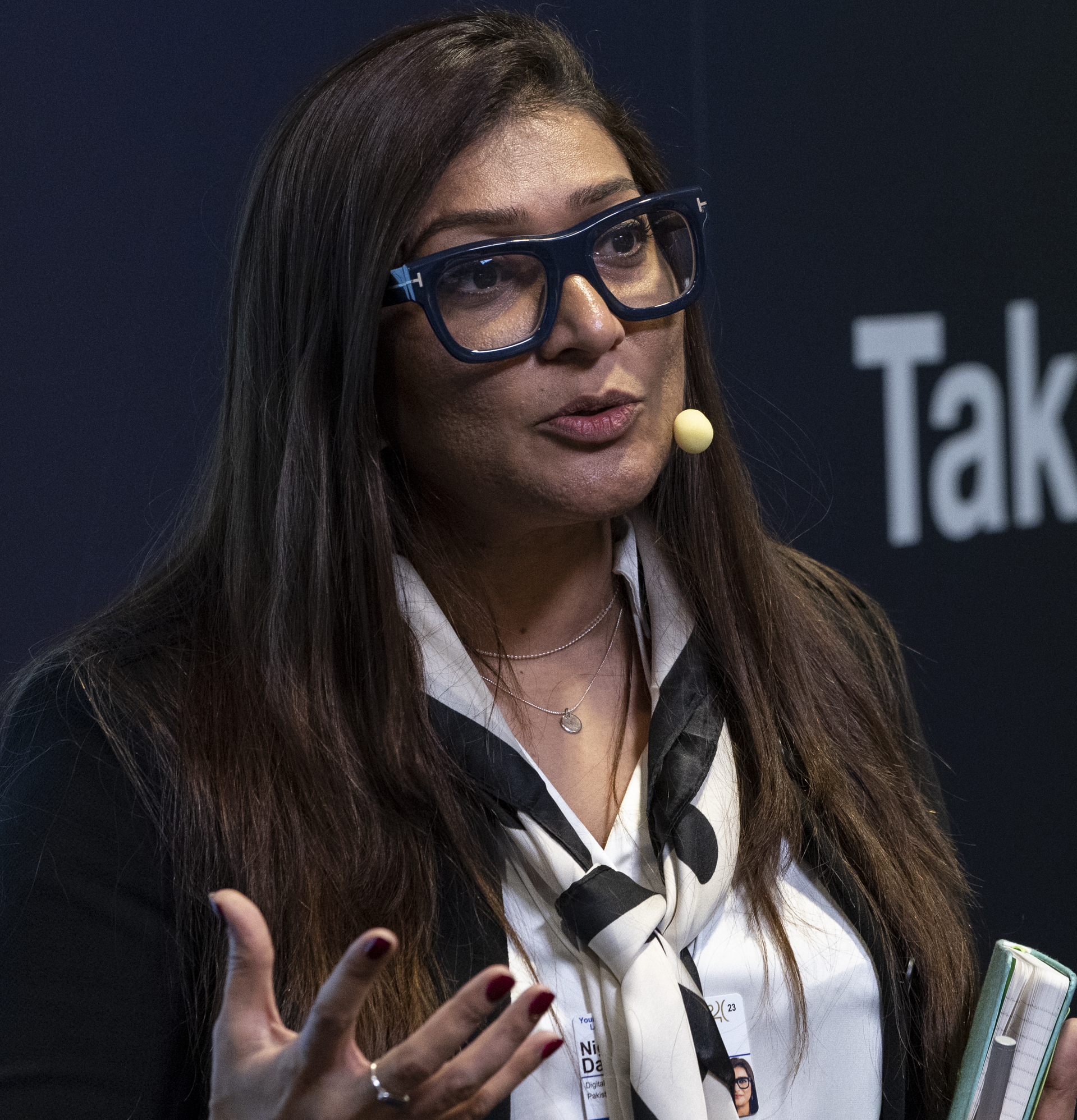
Nighat Dad, one of Shafi's lawyers

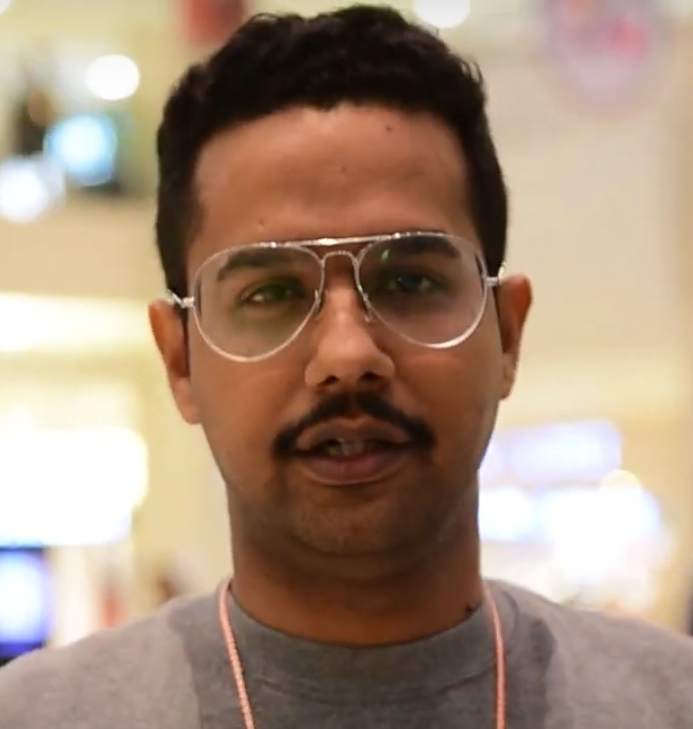
Ali Gul Pir, one of the suspects booked under cybercrime

In November 2018, Ali Zafar also filed a cybercrime complaint with the Federal Investigation Agency (FIA), and claimed that a social media campaign was launched against him days before Shafi accused him publicly. He further presented a Twitter account named Neha Saigol, which he called one of the "fake accounts" and was being followed by Shafi, Saba Hameed, Iffat Omar, and her lawyer Nighat Dad, and it had made thousands of tweets against Zafar. After July 2019, the FIA began issuing notices to those involved. (Note: Claims and information are extracted from Fake Accounts Short Report by Ali Zafar, Dawn News, The Express Tribune, Independent Urdu, and BBC Urdu.) In October 2020, the FIA suspended an officer reportedly over a complaint by Imaan Mazari for favouring Zafar, though the official statement denied such reason.

On 16 December 2020, the FIA's Cyber Crime Wing booked Shafi and eight others under Section 20 (1) of the Prevention of Electronic Crimes Act (PECA Ordinance, 2016) and Section 109 of Pakistan Penal Code (PPC). Later, first information reports (FIR) and subsequently bailable arrest warrants were issued against them to appear before the court. The names included actress Iffat Omar, activist Leena Ghani, rapper Ali Gul Pir, and journalist Maham Javaid. Some people, including blogger Humna Raza, issued an apology, so their names were dropped by Zafar's legal team. In response, Shafi's legal team filed a petition in the High Court arguing that the act was unconstitutional, as they faced a risk of imprisonment, and they claimed that they faced unusual questioning from an investigation officer (IO); however, the petition was dismissed in March 2022. (Note: Claims and pieces of information are extracted from VOA Urdu, ARY News, The News, The Guardian, Gulf News, The Friday Times, Dawn, Al Jazeera, Silencing Sexual Harassment and Violence Disclosures by Farieha Aziz, and Writ Petition No. 24397/2021 by the Lahore High Court.)

In June 2022, the Supreme Court entered an appeal by Shafi's legal team against the dismissal, where unclarity was found in the Section 20 of the PECA Ordinance. Later, the case went on to the Federal Constitutional Court of Pakistan in October 2026.

=== Cases against Ali Zafar ===
==== Shafi's workplace harassment complaint ====
Shafi filed a complaint with the provincial ombudsperson under the Protection Against Harassment of Women at Workplace Act 2010, which was dismissed on "technical grounds", specifying that there was no employer-employee relationship between Zafar and Shafi. Shafi appealed the ombudsperson's order to the Governor of Punjab, Pakistan, who also dismissed her appeal. The governor's decision was then challenged at the Lahore High Court, which was again dismissed in October 2018. Reportedly, this highlighted the loopholes in the Pakistani judicial system about not having the broader definition of a workplace. (Note: Opinion is extracted from Arab News, Geo News, and Dawn.)

In January 2021, the Supreme Court entered an appeal by Shafi's legal team against the dismissal.

==== Shafi's defamation suit ====
In April 2019, Shafi's legal team issued a notice to Zafar stating that he had falsely stated on multiple television networks that Shafi had lied about the sexual harassment allegations against him to gain fame and Canadian immigration. On 17 September 2019, Shafi filed a civil defamation suit of Rs. 200 crore against Zafar, arguing that she was already a celebrity as well as a Canadian citizen at the time of the original complaint. However, in February 2020, the case could not proceed because the sessions court decided to focus on Zafar's case first. Shafi subsequently appealed at the Lahore High Court, which on 19 January 2022 removed the bar on proceeding with this case against Zafar as well.

==== Ghani's defamation suit ====
In January 2021, Leena Ghani also filed a civil defamation suit of Rs. 50 crore at the Sindh High Court against Zafar. She called out his tweets from December 2020 that he falsely accused her of being one of those who were involved against him on social media, and that it was damaging to her reputation. She further claimed that she felt "horrified" and "objectified" in June 2014 when Zafar tried "saying vulgar things" to her during a fashion week event in London. She is also a graduate of NCA and has known Shafi and Zafar for a long time. (Note: Claims and pieces of information are extracted are from Al-Jazeera, Geo News, Dawn, ARY News, and 24 Digital.)

== Verdict and aftermath ==
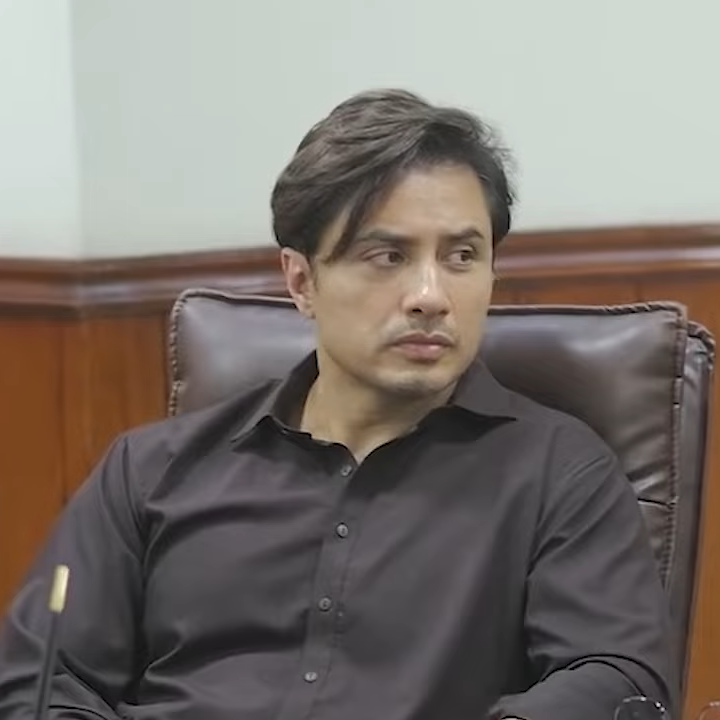
Verdict was ruled in March 2026 in Zafar's favour

On 31 March 2026, Judge Asif Hayat presented the verdict by ruling in favour of Zafar in his defamation case, ordering Shafi to pay Rs. 50 lakh in damages, and restraining her from making any further "defamatory allegations". The trial reportedly had a total of more than 280 hearings, which included the statements from 20 witnesses, and nine judges were changed at various points. According to Ali Sibtain Fazli, more than 40 cases have been filed at different levels.

Aaj TV and Voicepk.net interviewed both lawyers after the verdict. Saqib Jillani, representing Shafi, argued that Zafar's defamation suit was invalid because Shafi had first approached the ombudsperson on 30 April 2018, that the verdict may create a negative social impact for harassment victims, and that the judge could only dismiss the case on the ground that Shafi did not prove her allegations. Umar Tariq Gill, representing Zafar, responded that this should be treated as a case between two individuals, not applied to real victims of harassment, that the ruling was based on evidence and witnesses, that the ombudsperson complaint was dismissed without notifying Zafar, and that Zafar initiated legal action within a week, while Shafi relied on social media and print media.

Unsatisfied with the verdict, Shafi's legal team challenged the verdict at the Lahore High Court, considering that the workplace harassment case and the cybercrime case were still pending before the Supreme Court, as was the counter‑defamation suit. Despite this, Zafar's legal team claimed that nothing could be "pending in any other forum" because the allegations were declared "false", "defamatory", and against "public interest". The High Court declined to suspend the defamation ruling, and directed Shafi to deposit half damages in cash, and submit a surety for the other half, with the court.

== See also ==
- Harvey Weinstein sexual abuse cases
- Depp v. Heard
