= Pepsi Battle of the Bands =

Pakistani musical television series

- Show logo
- Also known as: Pepsi BoB
- Genre: Reality
- Created by: PepsiCo Pakistan
- Directed by: Andrew Bramley (S2)
- Presented by: Ayesha Omer (S2, S3); Hina Altaf (S4)
- Judges: Rohail Hyatt (S1); Fifi Haroon (S1); Shahi Hasan (S1, 2); Fawad Khan (S2, 3, 4); Meesha Shafi (S2, 3, 4); Atif Aslam (S2); Farooq Ahmed (S2, S3); Strings (S3)
- Theme music composer: Faisal Baig
- Opening theme: "Battle of the Bands" by Shahi Hasan (S2); Strings (S3)
- Country of origin: Pakistan
- No. of seasons: 4
- No. of episodes: 8

Production
- Executive producers: PepsiCo: Salman Butt, Saad Munawar, Natasha Hyder, Ali Zaidi, Misbah Ghani, Shehryar Ahmed
- Producers: Shiny Floor & The Cion Collective: Saad Mujeeb, Faisal Rafi
- Cinematography: Nick Collier
- Camera setup: Multi-camera
- Running time: 1 hour
- Production company: PepsiCo Pakistan

Original release
- Network: PTV Home (2002); Broadcast syndication (2017–2018)
- Release: July 2002 – August 2019

Pepsi Battle of the Bands is a Pakistani television series, originally based on the concept of Battle of the Bands, first aired in 2002 on PTV Home. The show was revived in 2017.

== Season 1 ==
Pepsi Battle of the Bands: Season 1 aired in July 2002 on PTV Home. The inaugural season was directed by Ahsan Rahim and Amena Khan, and produced by Nofil Naqvi. The winners were Aaroh, who beat runners up Entity Paradigm by a narrow margin. It also launched the success of many other bands who took part in the show, particularly Mekaal Hasan Band (which came in third) and Mizmaar. 170 applications were sent to the show's website out of which 70 were registered. The top 20 were selected on the basis of vocals, music and arrangements which was then narrowed down to the top 10.

=== Bands ===
The following 10 bands were selected for season 1.

- Aaroh (1st - winners)
- Entity Paradigm (2nd)
- Mekaal Hassan Band (3rd)
- Aks
- Brain Masala
- Messiah
- Mizmaar
- Sahara
- The Shahzad Hameed Project
- Yaar

The following bands failed to make the top 10 for season 1.

- Aasaar
- Azal (no-show)
- Just in Case
- Naqsh
- Once
- Punch
- Ravens
- Saaz
- Silence (disqualified)
- Still (no-show)

=== Judges ===
The judges for season 1 included former members of the band Vital Signs and music producers Shahi Hasan and Rohail Hyatt as well as Pakistani fashion and music critic Fifi Haroon.

== Season 2 ==
Episodes of Pepsi Battle of the Bands: Season 2 are available in broadcast syndication on television as well as put up online on Pepsi Pakistan's YouTube channel. Shortly after, the episode airs the full video performances are then put up online on Pepsi Pakistan's Facebook and YouTube while the full audios are put up on the website as well as on Patari.pk.

=== History ===
The return of the show and subsequent second season was revealed in early 2017. It also marked the return of season 1 winners Aaroh to the music scene after 8 years - although they had released "Mera Pyar" in 2014 with vocalist Rizwan Anwar, it received little attention. Season 2 also marks the return of Fawad Khan to music.

=== Promotion ===
The promo video song was released on 22 July 2017. It featured Atif Aslam, Meesha Shafi and Fawad Khan performing a tribute-mashup of Vital Signs' "Do Pal Ka Jeevan" and Alamgir's "Dekha Na Tha"; as well as Shahi Hasan on guitars with the trio. The video also showed many young people performing which is the show's main target audience.

The Pakistani music streaming platform Patari.pk put up Entity Paradigm's debut album Irtiqa on its service along with creating "Best of Playlists" of S1 winners Aaroh as well as Mekaal Hasan Band and Mizmaar, both bands which went on to mainstream success because of S1.

=== Judges and host ===
The judges of S2 included Fawad Khan, Meesha Shafi and Farooq Ahmed in the auditions round while Khan, Shafi, Atif Aslam and Shahi Hasan were the judges in the knockout round. Ayesha Omer was the host of the season.

=== Episodes ===
==== Episode 1: Auditions round ====
Episode 1 premiered on Sunday, 30 July 2017. The bands that performed included:

Band	Perf.	Judged
Naksh	Sajjad Ali's "Bolo Bolo" (cover)	positive feedback
Positive	Allan Fakir's "Kalab" (cover)	positive feedback
Pindi Boys	"Pindi Boys" (original)	positive feedback
Kashmir	Entity Paradigms "Hamesha" (cover)	positive feedback
Bari	Aaroh's "Yaara" (cover)	not selected
Madlock	"Aarzoo" (original)	positive feedback
Shajr	Mekaal Hasan Band's "Ya Ali" (cover)	positive feedback
Soul Anesthetics	"Kabhi Aar, Kabhi Paar" (original)	not selected
Aura	"Main Hoon" (original)	positive feedback
OB Positive	Vital Signs's "Aitebar" (cover)	positive feedback

==== Episode 2: Auditions round & Final selection ====
The auditions round continued and the bands that performed included:

Band	Perf.	Judged
Ehl-e-Rock	"Junoon" (original)	positive feedback
Khamaaj	"Bezuban" (original)	positive feedback
Nafs	Manjihi Faqeer's "Main Shah" (cover)	not selected
Badnaam Band	"Alif Allah" (original)	positive feedback
E Sharp	"600 Saal"	positive feedback
Yoon	Amir Khusro's "Chaap Tilak" (cover)	not selected
Darvesh	"Sawali" (original)	positive feedback
Roots	"Mujhse Door" (original)	positive feedback; their performance was not aired but due to the band making it in the top 8, it was uploaded online

The bands that were selected in the top 8 included in alphabetical order:

- Aura
- Badnaam Band
- Darvesh
- Pindi Boys
- Kashmir
- Madlock
- Roots
- Shajr

Positive was originally in the top 8 but were disqualified because they performed with a temporary member in the auditions round which was against the rules of the show.

The bands that were in the waiting list but did not get selected and their performance not being shown on TV or online included:

- Visaal
- Kainat
- Xaviar
- The Grovers: Quetta Boys
- Sikandar Ka Mandar
- Raakh
- Amigos

The episode ended with last season winners Aaroh performing Raag Neela with Kashan Admani, lead guitarist of the band Mizmaar on lead guitars.

==== Episode 3: Top 8 knockout round ====
The theme of the episode was favorite song. Each band had to perform their favourite song in front of the judges and the live studio audience. The episode started with Atif Aslam performing his new song titled "Yaad Tehari". The bands performed in the following order:

Band	Perf. (cover)	Judged
Darvesh	Sounds of Kolachi's "Allah Hi Dega"	positive feedback
Pindi Boys	Vital Signs's "Dil Dhoondta Hai"	positive feedback
Aura	Alamgir's "Dekha Na Tha"	mixed feedback
Madlock	Entity Paradigm's "Kahan Hai Tu"	positive feedback
Kashmir	Aamir Zaki's "Mera Pyar"	Dubbed the performance of the season
Badnaam Band	"Kala Jora Pa" (traditional folk)	positive feedback
Shajr	Nusrat Fateh Ali Khan's "Kisay Da Yaar"	didn't manage to impress the judges
Roots	"Iss Baar Milo" by Hadiqa Kiani and Aamir Zaki	mixed feedback

The bands that ended up in the danger zone were Roots, Aura and Shajr. Aura and Shajr were eliminated leaving 6 bands in the show.

==== Episode 4: Top 6 knockout round ====
The knockout round continued with top 6. The episode started with musician Sara Haider performing her new song "Zindagi". The theme of this episode was that the each band had to perform an original song in front of the judges and the live studio audience. The bands performed in the following order:

Band	Perf. (original)	Judged
Kashmir	"Budha Baba"	mixed feedback
Darvesh	"Sadaye Darvesh"	mixed feedback; they made some mistakes in the ending as noted by the judges
Pindi Boys	"Corina"	episode's highlight performance
Roots	"Khirkiyaan"	mixed feedback; the weak lyrics were pointed out by the judges
Madlock	"Kab Hoga"	mixed feedback; the weak lyrics and less energy as compared to their previous performances were pointed out
Badnaam Band	"Khawaja Ki Deewani"	performed cover in the original round and cleared.

The bands that ended up in the danger zone were Roots, Darvesh and Madlock. Darvesh and Madlock were eliminated leaving 4 bands in the show.

=== Production ===
==== Produced by ====
- Saad Bin Mujeeb
- Faisal Rafi

==== Lighting Director ====
- Jack Lineker

==== Open & Show Packaging ====
- Rashna Abdi
- Ahmed Aleem
- Hadi Gala

==== Set Design ====
- Imtisal Abbasi
- Misbah Ghani

==== Music Team ====
Music Producer: Faisal Rafi

Exec. Producer: Ali Diwan

Music Director/Mentor/Composer: Ahsan Bari

Music Director/Mentor/Composer: Faisal Baig

Project Manager: Agha Fahad

Chief Recording Engineer/Sound Designer/Audio Post Supervisor: Kashif Ejaz at The C'Ion Collective Studios

Lyricist/Consultant: Asim Raza

Assistant Producer: Daniel Hayden

Assistant Producer: Haris Noor, Quaid Ahmed

Assistant Engineer: Zyad Ahmed Tariq

Mixing Engineers: Chris Bolster & Paul Pritchard at Abbey Road Studios

Mastered by: Alex Gordon and Alex Wharton at Abbey Road Studios

Live Sound Engineer: Obaid Haq

Chief Audio Tech: Nadeem Ducrrani & Saif Ullah

==== Line Producer ====
- Noor Daudpota

=== Broadcast ===
Following television channels aired the show: (Note: All times are in PST UTC+5.)

Timeslot	Channel
4:00 PM	ARY Digital
4:30 PM	ARY News
4:30 PM	Dunya News
4:30 PM	Express News
4:30 PM	News One
4:30 PM	Samaa TV
4:30 PM	Dawn News
4:30 PM	Geo News
4:30 PM	Lahore News HD
4:30 PM	Abb Takk News
5:00 PM	24 News HD
5:00 PM	City 41
5:00 PM	Jaag TV
5:00 PM	Capital TV
5:00 PM	Business Plus
5:00 PM	Neo News
5:00 PM	Channel 5
5:00 PM	City 42
5:30 PM	Geo Entertainment
5:30 PM	Metro One
5:30 PM	Geo Kahani
5:30 PM	KTN
6:00 PM	ATV
6:00 PM	TVOne Global
6:00 PM	Urdu 1
6:00 PM	A-Plus TV
6:00 PM	PTV Home
6:00 PM	Filmazia
6:00 PM	ARY Zindagi
6:00 PM	Awaz Television Network
6:00 PM	AXN Pakistan
6:30 PM	Hum TV
6:30 PM	Aaj News
6:30 PM	See TV
6:30 PM	Filmax
6:30 PM	Film World
6:30 PM	Aaj Entertainment
6:30 PM	Such TV
6:30 PM	Waqt News
6:30 PM	Express Entertainment
6:30 PM	8XM
7:00 PM	VSH News
7:00 PM	Pashto 1
7:00 PM	HTV Pakistan
7:00 PM	Play Entertainment
7:00 PM	Aruj TV
7:00 PM	Kashish TV
7:00 PM	Mehran TV
7:30 PM	Geo Super
9:00 PM	Afghan TV
9:00 PM	Sindh TV
9:00 PM	Jalwa TV
9:00 PM	Punjab TV
9:00 PM	Apna Channel
9:00 PM	Dharti TV
9:00 PM	Waseb TV
9:00 PM	Raavi TV

=== Reception ===
Season 2 has mostly received positive reviews. Maheen Sabeeh of The News said, "Whether the show manages to accomplish its mission statement to the letter remains to be seen but, having spoken to almost all major players in the production, it can be said with certainty that it has just the right motivation behind it and that matters more than we care to admit." The Nation wrote, "With such an eclectic mix of sounds and energies, right from the get go - we are rooted to our televisions, waiting with bated breath till the second episode of the inevitably and justifiably iconic, biggest music battle in the country; Pepsi Battle of the Bands." Vafa Batool of Pakistan Today wrote "The first episode showed how the judges focused on grossly distinct aspects of the performances. Fawad Khan preferred to acknowledge the raw live energy on stage while Meesha Shafi's focus remained largely on vocal quality. Farooq Ahmed offered technical help to the bands as a well-nuanced musician who was more concerned about improving the sounds further." Dawn wrote "Looks like we're in for a great show"

However, the second season has been criticized by some as well. Pakistani music, fashion critic and Season 1 judge Fifi Haroon on her Twitter called it "bland, listless". Speaking to Gulf News journalist Usman Ghafoor, Pakistani culture critic Nadeem Farooq Paracha said, "Pepsi is 10 years too late. When the last season went on air, the reality was quite different; we still had underground and mainstream music happening at the time. From mid-2000s on, the bands started to whittle away for all sorts of reasons — political, social, and security. Besides, today, we are talking about a different generation — not even the millennials but generation Z, the kids who were born in early 2000s or late 1990s. The dynamics of understanding and listening to music have changed all around the world. No one listens to albums or CDs now; they listen to singles and stream videos. BOTB, in my opinion, has failed to capture the imagination of this new generation."

Some critics even compared the show with Coke Studio though the comparison has been rejected by those involved with the show. Pakistani actor Shaan Shahid criticized the format of the show and said on his Facebook that Pepsi should stick to critic as Coke Studio owns the music scene. His comments received a lot of criticism.

The decision to not include some bands in the top eight particularly the band Khamaaj was criticized.

== Season 3 ==
Season 3 started in 2018 and Xarb and Bayaan fought for the title with the latter going to clinch the title. Ali Zafar had been hired to co-judge alongside Meesha Shafi and Fawad Khan, replacing Atif Aslam from the previous season. However, due to the Ali Zafar vs. Meesha Shafi case, Zafar had to step down before the recording could start. After a few days, Strings members Bilal Maqsood and Faisal Kapadia replaced him. (Note: Claims and pieces of information are extracted from Dawn, The Nation, and The News.)

== Season 4 ==
Season 4 started in 2019 and Aarish and Auj fought for the title with the latter going to clinch the title.

== See also ==
- Coke Studio
- Nescafé Basement
- Uth Records
- Pakistan Idol
