= Aaroh =

Pakistani rock band

Background information
- Origin: Karachi, Sindh, Pakistan
- Genres: Alternative rock; pop rock; power pop
- Years active: 1998–2009; 2013–2014; 2017–present
- Labels: Sadaf Stereo (2003–2005) (Pakistan); Sangeet Records (2003–2005) (International); The Musik Records (2006–2009); Independent (2013–14) (2017–present)
- Members: Farooq Ahmed; Khalid Khan; Jason Anthony; Asad Ul Hafeez
- Past members: Haider Hashimi; Nabeel Nihal Chishty; Kamran Khan (Kami Jee); Adnan Hussain; Rizwan Anwar

Aaroh (Urdu: آروح transl. the ascending scale in eastern classical music) is an alternative rock band from Karachi, Sindh, Pakistan, formed in 1998. The band was founded by keyboardist Kamran Khan and lead guitarist Nabeel Nihal, who were joined by, singer Farooq Ahmed, bassist Khalid Khan and drummer Adnan Hussain.

The band achieved fame in 2002 when they won the national Pepsi Battle of the Bands competition. Soon, after the success of the battle of the bands, Hussain was replaced by drummer Jason Anthony and then the band went on releasing their critically acclaim debut album, Sawaal, in September 2003. Singles from the album like Sawaal, Na Kaho, Jalan and Jeeyay were a success and topped several local music charts. In 2004, band members Ahmed and Chishty went into a dispute that who owns the rights for the band's name. This saw Chishty and Kamran Khan leaving as the band officially announced their split up. The band then recruited Haider Hashmi on lead guitars as a replacement for Chishty. Aaroh, with their new lead guitarist, then went on releasing their second studio album Raag Neela in 2006, receiving critical acclaim. Singles such as "Raag Neela", "Pyaar Ka Jaal" and "Janay Kyun" did well at the local music charts.

== History ==
=== Formation (2002) ===
In early 2002, during this time Pepsi Battle of the Bands advertisement began to air on television; the competition called upon entries of aspiring bands from all over Pakistan. This saw the band taking participation in the competition by the name "Aaroh", given by Shoaib Mansoor. It was during this time Aaroh officially came into being. Aaroh band members got together for the Battle of the Bands and went to perform at the competition. The band first took part in the digital round of the competition, where the band went on head to head with twenty hundred bands from across the four provinces of Pakistan. The competition included bands like Entity Paradigm, Mekaal Hasan Band and Mizmaar, which also later on became well known popular mainstream rock bands coming from the underground music scene. During the competition, the band performed songs "Sawaal", "Aag Ki Tarhan" and also covering the Vital Signs song, "Ajnabi".

After a sixteen months hiatus, during which the competition was being aired on national, cable and satellite television programmes, viewers polled for their favourite band in the competition. By then the results of the Battle of the Bands came out and it was told that two bands who made to the finals were Aaroh along with Entity Paradigm. The band went on perform to compete at the finals of the competition held in Karachi, Sindh. The band won the competition by a narrow margin to Entity Paradigm, who came runner-ups, in front of an audience of around 4,000 at the NRA Golf Club, where the finals were held.

=== Success (2003–2005) ===
On 21 September 2003, the band went on releasing their debut album Sawaal, through the record label Sadaf Stereo all over Pakistan.

Shortly after the release of Sawaal, the lead-guitarist Nabeel Nihal Chishty and the keyboard player Kamran Khan did the title track for the 2004 Bollywood film Rakht using the band's label which led to band members Khalid Khan and Farooq Ahmed having dispute with Nabeel Nihal Chishty and Kamran Khan. Farooq Ahmed and Khalid Khan kept the Aaroh brand and were joined by Haider Hashmi on lead guitars and Jason Anthony and release the music video of Na Kaho which became their most popular song to date.

=== 2006–2009 ===
Aaroh released a few music videos from their new album Raag Neela. The full album was released in late 2006.

Aaroh disbanded in 2009 concentrating on their personal projects. Farooq Ahmed, vocalist and Haider Hashmi, lead guitarist, went on to pursue a career as solo musicians, while bassist Khalid Khan went on performing as a session player for the band Fuzön.

Farooq Ahmed moved to the United States in 2010, one year after Aaroh disbanding.

=== Return (2013–14) ===
With Farooq Ahmed living in the US, Haider Hashmi, Khalid Khan and Jason Anthony started thinking about reforming with a new vocalist Rizwan Anwar.

Aaroh released a new single Mera Pyar in 2013. There were plans on working on an album as well.

Haider Hashmi died in 2014 due to brain tumor which led to Aaroh disbanding and plans for the album being cancelled. In 2016 Nescafe Basement paid a tribute to the late guitarist in the seventh episode of the fourth season of the show.

=== Comeback (2017–present) ===
Pepsi Battle of the Bands was being resurrected in 2017 and Farooq Ahmed was asked to be a guest judge in the auditions round, which he accepted.

Aaroh confirmed its comeback while speaking to the Express Tribune. On August 1, 2017, Aaroh released a teaser of their new track titled Jeet Banjae Apna Nishaan which was released in February 2018 titled as Jeet and was a tribute to the Pakistan Super League. The band performed Raag Neela in the second episode of the second season of Pepsi Battle of the Bands featuring Kashan Admani of Mizmaar, officially marking their comeback and have been performing at different venues since then. The band also performed Na Kaho in the last episode of Pepsi Battle of the Bands.

In late 2017, Asad Ul Hafeez joined the band on lead guitars. Later on 3 December 2017, Aaroh in partnership with Patari released Mein Nahi Manta (Dastoor) a rendition of Habib Jalib's Dastoor accompanied with a music video. The song was released as a Patari exclusive on the streaming site and YouTube.

== Awards and nominations ==
Aaroh's most significant achievement was winning the Pepsi Battle of the Bands in 2002. Aaroh has also been nominated at the ARY Asian/Bollywood Awards for the "Best Band" award in 2004 and received a nomination for the "Best Lyrics Award" for their song "Na Kaho" at the Indus Music Awards in 2005.

== Discography ==
Studio albums

- Sawaal (2003)
- Raag Neela (2006)

Soundtracks

- Rakht (title track for the 2004 Bollywood film Rakht)

Singles

- Mera Pyar (2013)
- Mein Nahi Manta (Dastoor) (2017)
- Jeet (2018)

== Music videos ==
Year	Title
2003	Sawaal
2003	Jalan
2003	Jeeyay
2004	Na Kaho
2005	Pyaar ka Jaal
2006	Raag Neela
2007	Yaara
2013	Mera Pyar
2017	Mein Nahi Manta (Dastoor)

== Band members ==
Current line-up

- Farooq Ahmed – Lead vocals (1998–2009) (2017–Present)
- Jason Anthony – Drums (2003–2009) (2013-2014) (2017-Present)
- Khalid Khan – Bass guitar (1998–2009) (2013-2014) (2017-Present)
- Asad Ul Hafeez – Lead guitar (2017–Present)

Former members

- Rizwan Anwar – Lead vocals (2013–2014)
- Kamran "Kami Jee" Khan – Keyboards, Backing vocals (1998–2004)
- Nabeel Nihal Chishty – Lead guitar, Backing vocals (1998–2004)
- Adnan Hussain – Drums (1998–2002)
- Haider Hashmi – Lead guitar, Rhythm guitar (2004–2009)(2013-2014)

Session musicians

- Saeed Ahmad Mughal – Drums (2006)

== See also ==
- List of Pakistani music bands
