= Atish Raj =

Pakistani rock band

- Origin: Karachi, Sindh, Pakistan
- Genres: Industrial rock, Progressive rock, Art rock
- Years active: 1994–1996; 2006–2007
- Past members: Nadeem F. Paracha; Rome K. Kashif Caan; Zeeshan Parwez

Atish Raj (Urdu: آتش راج transl. Fiery reign, also spelled, Aatish Raj), was an industrial and avant-garde Pakistani rock band formed and fronted by Pakistani music journalist and writer, Nadeem F. Paracha.

== Relaunch ==
In a recent development Paracha was approached by Zeeshan Pervez, leader of Sajid & Zeeshan, for the remixing of an Atish Raj song, "War in Heaven." The song was relaunched in February 2007.

== See also ==
- List of Pakistani music bands
