= Bayaan (band) =

Pakistani rock band

Bayaan بیان
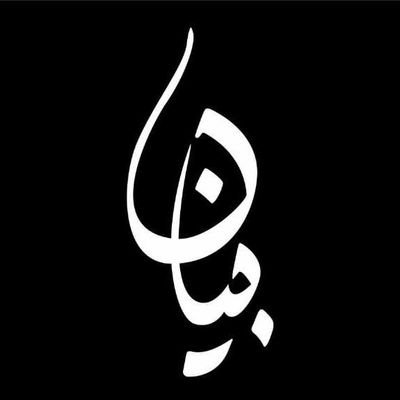

Background information
- Origin: Lahore, Punjab, Pakistan
- Genres: Progressive rock; folk
- Years active: 2015–present
- Labels: Rearts, Sony Music Pakistan
- Members: Asfar Hussain; Shahrukh Aslam; Mansoor Lashari; Muqueet Shahzad; Haider Abbas
- Website: rearts.pk/artist/bayaan/

Bayaan (Urdu: بیان transl. Expression) is an alternative rock band from Lahore, Pakistan. They won the Pepsi Battle of the Bands Season 3 in 2018. Appeared in Nescafe Basement, the band had performed throughout Pakistan before appearing in Pepsi Battle of the Bands. The 5-member band consists of Asfar Hussain (vocalist), Haider Abbas (bassist), Shahrukh Aslam (guitarist), Muqueet Shahzad (guitarist), and Mansoor Lashari (drummer). The band members Shahzad and Abbas knew each other for more than a decade and played together in the school band. They moved to the underground music circuit and met Mansoor Lashari. In between, Lashari and Abbas became a part of Nescafe Basement where they performed with Hussain and Aslam. Thus, Bayaan came into existence. Bayaan is managed by their bassist, Haider Abbas.

== Nescafe Basement ==
Bayaan started its musical journey through a popular music show in Pakistan, Nescafe Basement. With Nescafe Basement, Bayaan released a few singles in Pakistan. Post Nescafe Basement, they came together to produce their own music.

== Pepsi Battle of the Bands ==
Following the appearance in Nescafe Basement, Bayaan came to Pepsi Battle of the Bands Season 3 and become the winners with Xarb being the runners up. Their album and music videos will be released soon as a part of the contract they won with the title. Bayaan returned to season 4 to perform with Season 2 winners Kashmir.

== Lollywood ==
Bayaan's song Nahi Milta was featured in Yalghaar.

== Discography ==
Chaar Saal	Suno	Safar	Pepsi Battle of the Bands	Lollywood	OSTs	Other Tracks
Farda	Azhik	Milaap	Dhaltay Rahay Feat. Kashmir	Nahi Milta - Yalghaar	Bonded Labor	Tayraak
Nahi Milta	Bekhabar	Darya	Bekhabar	Nahi Milta - Yalghaar	Bonded Labor	Dill Ka Ghar
Din Dhalay	Mera Musafir	Maand	Farda	Nahi Milta - Yalghaar	Bonded Labor	Sapna
Hum Nadaan	Jaag	Saahil	Inteha-e-Shauq	Nahi Milta - Yalghaar	Bonded Labor	Kahan Jaoon
Khel Tamasha	Tifl	Tere Naal	Hum Nadaan	Nahi Milta - Yalghaar	Bonded Labor	Teri Tasveer 2.0
	Teri Tasveer	Kahan Jaoon	Tou Kya Hua	Nahi Milta - Yalghaar	Bonded Labor	
	Daira	Koi Saaya	Raaz-e-Fitna	Nahi Milta - Yalghaar	Bonded Labor	
	Paani Aur Mitti	Akheriwaar	Baazaar	Nahi Milta - Yalghaar	Bonded Labor	
	Suno	Safar	Paani Aur Mitti	Nahi Milta - Yalghaar	Bonded Labor	
	Khel Tamaasha [Bonus Track] - Unplugged		Nahi Milta	Nahi Milta - Yalghaar	Bonded Labor	
			Ye Watan	Nahi Milta - Yalghaar	Bonded Labor	
			Azaadi	Nahi Milta - Yalghaar	Bonded Labor	

== Debut Music Album 'Suno' ==
Bayaan has announced the release of their debut album ‘Suno’ on the 2nd of Feb at the illustrious Lahore Music Meet festival. The album comprises 9 songs.Through this album they pay homage to the band's collective inspirations and influences while staying distinctly Bayaan. The album has been released and distributed by rearts. The music video for the song Bekhabar was released earlier but later the song was made a part of the album.

== Coke Studio Season 14 ==
The lead vocalist for Bayaan, Asfar Hussain featured in Coke Studio (Pakistani season 14) with Arooj Aftab for a song "Mehram", written and composed by him.

== See also ==
- List of Pakistani music bands
