= Badnaam (band) =

- Origin: Lahore
- Genres: Grunge, sufi rock
- Years active: 2009–present
- Label: PepsiCo Pakistan
- Members: Ahmed Jilani; Lala Ahsan; Raheem Shahbaz Sunny

Badnaam (Urdu: بدنام transl. Infamous) is a Pakistani grunge band from Lahore, Pakistan. It is the runners up band of Pepsi Battle of the Bands Season 2 in 2017. Formed in 2009, the band has played for numerous shows throughout Pakistan before performing in Pepsi Battle of the Bands. The three-member band consists of Ahmed Jilani (vocalist and lead guitarist), Lala Ahsan (drummer), and Raheem Shahbaz Sunny (bassist). The band also performed the team anthem 'Quetta Kai Kai' for Quetta Gladiators in the 4th Edition of Pakistan Super League. The band gained popularity because of their sufi rock and grunge genre and their combination of a unique performing style and use of strong vocals.

== Pepsi Battle of the Bands ==
After ending up as the runners up in Pepsi Battle of the Bands, Badnaam released Aik Nuktay as part of their album along with Kashmir at a star studded evening in Avari Towers in Karachi. The albums were released by Pepsi.

== Discography ==
=== Pepsi Battle of the Bands ===
- Alif Allah
- Kala Jora Pa
- Bismillah Karan
- Ishqnaama (Mashup)
- Daastan-e-Faqeer
- Sham-e-Qalandar
- Khawaja Ki Deewani
- Kalyaan Ishq
- Deh Khudaya

=== Debut albums ===
- Ishq Mein Tere
- Aik Nuktay
- Zindagi

=== Ready Steady No ===
- Chham Chham - Ready Steady No

=== Pakistan Super League ===
- Quetta Kai Kai

== Band members ==
- Ahmed Jilani
- Lala Ahsan
- Raheem Shahbaz Sunny

== Nominations ==
- Nominated in Lux Style Awards in 2018 for Khwaji Ki Deewani in Best Emerging Talent Category
- Shan-e-Pakistan Awards 2018 for Best Rock Song

== See also ==
- List of Pakistani music bands
