= Topi Drama =

Pakistani rock band

- Origin: Lahore, Punjab, Pakistan
- Genre: Rock
- Years active: Since 2010; 16 years ago
- Members: Sohail Qureshi; Arafat Mazhar; Kenny Zeerick

Topi Drama (Urdu: ٹوپی ڈرامہ transl. An elaborate deception to mislead people) is a Pakistani rock band, formed in 2010, based in Lahore, Punjab.

== History ==
The three-member band was formed in 2010 with lead vocalist Sohail Qureshi, Arafat Mazhar and Kenny Zeerick.

In January 2013, the band released their first song "Inquilab", about the revolution which people dream of. "Khoon" is the band's latest song released in February 2013. Khoon is about the blood spilled all around in Pakistan specially for Shia community.

== Discography ==
- "Inquilab" (single) - 2013
- "Khoon" (single) - 2013

== Members ==
- Sohail Qureshi - lead vocalist
- Arafat Mazhar - guitarist
- Kenny Zeerick - drummer

== See also ==
- List of Pakistani music bands
