= Uth Records =

- Also known as: Ufone Uth Records
- Genre: Music
- Created by: Ufone
- Directed by: Zeeshan Parwez
- Country of origin: Pakistan
- Original languages: English; Urdu
- No. of seasons: 2

Production
- Producers: Louis ‘Gumby’ Pinto; Omran ‘Momo’ Shafique

Original release
- Release: 18 February 2011

Uth Records (or Ufone Uth Records) was a 2011 Pakistani music television reality show presented by the Ufone. Louis ‘Gumby’ Pinto was the producer of the show, he left Coke Studio when he offered for this show. Omran ‘Momo’ Shafique was also producer of the show with Gumby. Zeeshan Parwez directed the show.

== See also ==
- Music of Pakistan
- Coke Studio (Pakistan)
- Nescafé Basement
