= Laila Khan (singer) =

Pashto playback singer (born 1997)

Laila Khan لیلا خان
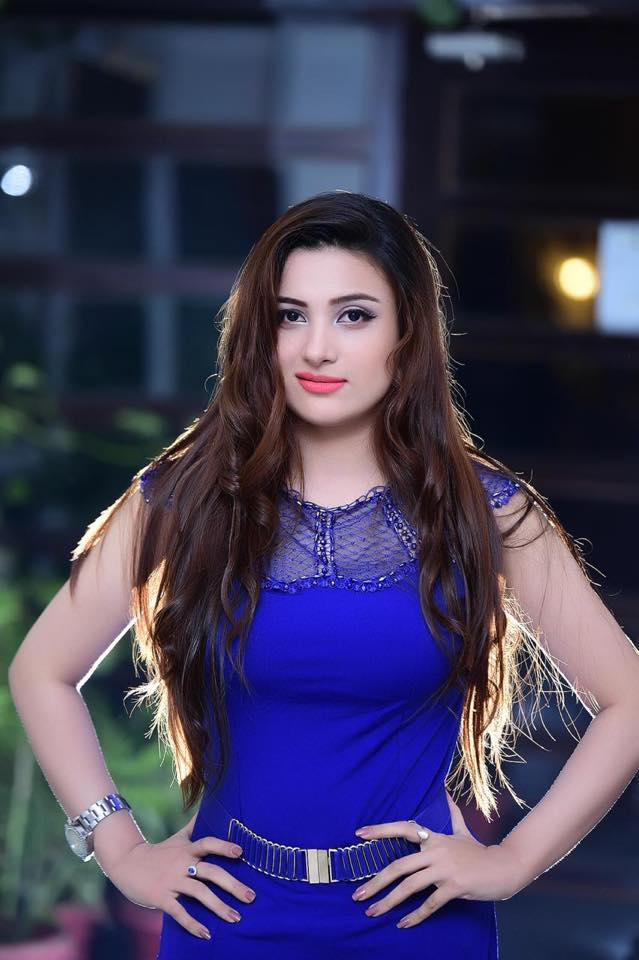
- Khan in 2016

Background information
- Also known as: Lilly
- Born: Laila Khan; 14 June 1997 (age 28); Peshawar, Khyber Pakhtunkhwa, Pakistan
- Origin: Peshawar, Khyber Pakhtunkhwa, Pakistan
- Genres: Pashto music • pop music
- Occupation: Singer
- Years active: 2013–present
- Label: Latoon Productions

Laila Khan (Pashto: لیلا خان; born 14 June 1997) is a Pakistani playback singer.

== Early life and career ==
Khan started her career in 2013, producing most of her work in the Pashto language. Her other compositions include Arabic and Urdu poetry. She has primarily worked with Latoon Productions.

Khan made her singing debut with Za Laila Yama song. In 2015, she produced songs titled Khabara Da Pakhtu Da and Dheere Dheere Se Meri Zindagi May Aana which were recorded for the Pakistan Super League cricket team Peshawar Zalmi). She has also worked in the Pollywood film industry.

In January 2015, Khan was one of the singers for the song Amann, written by Laiq Zada Laiq in memory of those who lost their lives in the 2014 Peshawar school massacre. As of May 2016, Khan was working with Latoon Productions' owner Fawad Khan on completing her latest Pashto album, focused on the students of Army Public School Peshawar and to all those who perished in the 2014 Peshawar school massacre. Two songs from this album have already been released.

In 2016, Khan was the chosen representative from Pakistan to perform at multiple international concerts in Tunisia, along with other global singers. Khan's participation in Tunisia's musical concerts was reportedly focused on "promoting peace in a region affected by militant insurgency which started five years ago". She is also known for a fusion song, which she performed in five languages such as Pashto, Urdu, French, English, and Dari. As of May 2016, she has performed in five concerts, with reports of 25 additional concerts being planned.
