= Khumariyaan =

Pakistani band

Khumariyaan خماریان
- Origin: Peshawar, Khyber Pakhtunkhwa, Pakistan
- Genres: Pop, Folk & Ethnic
- Members: Aamer Shafiq, Farhan Bogra, Shiraz Khan, Sparlay Rawail
- Website: khumariyaan.pk

Khumariyaan (Pashto: خماریان, transl. Hangovers) is a band from Khyber Pakthunwka province of Pakistan that plays a blend of Pashto music and modern musical styles. The band has represented their Culture abroad in Ireland, United Kingdom, United States of America, Kenya and elsewhere.

== Members ==
Aamer Shafiq plays guitar. He met the band members in their university in Peshawar .

Farhan Bogra plays Rubab. He also works as a cultural activist. He represents Pashto music and Pashtun culture.

Shiraz Khan is the band's percussionist. He plays a native Pushto music instrument known as the Zerbaghali, similar in shape to a Djembe. Shiraz holds a Bachelor's degree and Master's degree as well. He has the edge of being the only drummer of Pakistan who plays multiple drum pieces using sticks and hands simultaneously. He met with Farhan at their university. Shiraz was born in Karachi on 5th Sept 1989. He is a father of one boy and two girls. He has 3 other siblings, 2 in Peshawar (Shahnawaz and Shahzad) and one in Canada (Shahbaz).

Sparlay Rawail is an architect by profession with a degree from the National College of Arts and is also an artist. He first met with the three other band members at a concert for a random Jam session. Sparlay plays lead guitar and percussion. He is son of left-wing politician Ismat Shahjahan.

Obaid Khan is the new addition to the band. He is the lead vocalist of the band and also plays steel string guitar. He has done his Majors in Anthropology from Quaid-i-Azam University Islamabad. He is the youngest member of the band and was officially announced as part of the band in the year 2024.

== Awards and nominations ==
Year	Award	Category	Result	Ref
2016	15th Lux Style Awards	Best Song of the Year	Nominated	
2019	18th Lux Style Awards	Best Song of the Year	Winner	

== See also ==
- List of Pakistani music bands
