= Mizmaar =

Pakistani band

- Origin: Karachi, Pakistan
- Genres: Rock, Indie rock, Indie pop, Pop-rock, Fusion
- Labels: Dreamstation Productions, Universal Music
- Members: Kashan Admani, Alfred D'Mello
- Website: mizmaaronline.com

Mizmaar (Urdu: مضمار transl. Racetrack) is a Pakistani pop rock band, formed in 2000. It currently consists of guitarist Kashan Admani, lead singer Asad Rasheed, and drummer Alfred D'mello.

The band rose to fame in 2003 after the release of 'Kash', their debut album. They released their second album 'Sitara' in 2007. Mizmaar came out of a seven-year hiatus with three singles in 2015. They are currently functioning as a collaborative act, and are working on collaborations with singers across the Indian subcontinent. Most notable being Yeh Dil, a cross-border collaboration with Dr. Palash Sen, the front man of popular Indian band, Euphoria.

== Formation and early years (2000–2003) ==
In 2000, Kashan Admani met drummer Roger Faria, bassist Russell Owen and vocalist Rehan ul Haq, and initiated the formation of Mizmaar. They made it to Pepsi Battle of the bands 2002 along with other top selected upcoming music acts in Pakistan. Rehan ul Haq the vocalist was replaced by Daniyal Badshah soon after this Pepsi BOB event. All the members had previously worked in the Pakistan music circuit with various artists.

== Kash (2003–2007) ==
Amidst the rise of the indiepop music in the subcontinent, Mizmaar released their debut album 'Kash' in Pakistan which made them a pop rock sensation in the country. Two tracks from the album, 'LautKe Aa' and 'Kash', became major hits and got plenty of airtime on mainstream radio and TV channels. This album was not only commercially successful, it was loved by the critics as-well. Some media channel also entitled the band as "one of the greatest live acts to have come out of Pakistan". Soon after the newly gained popularity, drummer Roger Faria left the band and was replaced by a 19-year-old Alfred D’Mello. In 2005, bassist Russell Owen also left the band, post this the band had to use session musicians for their live performances.

== Sitara (2007–2008) ==
In 2007, four years after their debut release, the band released their second album 'Sitara'. It was launched worldwide on Universal Music India. The title track 'Sitara' and 'Hai Pyaar Kya', became instant hits. Sitara also became the soundtrack to the Hindi dub of the Hollywood movie, D-War.

A year after the release of their second album, the band was affected by vocalist Daniyal's personal problems which prompted Kashan and Alfred to concentrate more on their recording studio 'Dream Station Productions'. This eventually led to the end of the band. Kashan and Alfred continued working together to produce & direct albums, songs, jingles, music videos and TV commercials for various artists and brands through their company.

== Return (2015) ==
Seven years later, the band has made a return with a young vocalist. The band is working on their third album, with the first single 'Jee Loonga' released on 25 March 2015. The music video for the song has been directed by Kashan Admani himself. Mizmaar also made a comeback to the stage when they performed after 7 years at the Rock Festival '15 at St. Patrick's College in Karachi on 11 April 2015. The return of Mizmaar was touted as an important comeback in the history of pop-rock music in the subcontinent.

Following the success of the first single, the band released Dur, a rock ballad, on 21 June 2015, which is celebrated as World Music Day. It was well-received across the country. The band then collaborated with Dr. Palash Sen, the vocalist and founder of popular Indian band, Euphoria, for Yeh Dil. The music video for the song was released on the cusp of 14 and 15 August which are celebrated as Independence Day in Pakistan and India, respectively. This collaboration across the border was meant to promote harmony and give a message of peace between the two neighbouring countries. Mizmaar also collaborated with Indian Classical Singer Shubha Mudgal for a single named Jogi.

== Discography ==
Studio album

- Kash (2003)
- Sitara (2007)

Singles

- 2014 Jee Loonga
- 2014 Dur
- 2014 Yeh Dil feat. Palash Sen

== See also ==
- List of Pakistani music bands
