= Sajid & Zeeshan =

Pakistani electronic music duo

Sajid, Zeeshan
- Origin: Peshawar, Khyber Pakhtunkhwa, Pakistan
- Genres: Electronica, Alternative, Ambient
- Years active: 2003–present
- Label: EMI
- Members: Sajid Ghafoor; Zeeshan Parwez
- Website: www.sajidandzeeshan.com

Sajid & Zeeshan (Urdu: ساجد عبداللہ اور ذیشان الحق pronounced as "Saa-jid and Zeesh-shaan") are a Pakistani electronic music duo from Peshawar, composed of Sajid Ghafoor (guitars and harmonicas) and Zeeshan Parwez (synths, laptops and FX modules).

Both members released their debut album through EMI in August, 2006 titled "One Light Year at Snail Speed" along with a video release of their fourth single from the album "Have to Let Go Sometime".

== History ==
Sajid Abdullah, Zeeshan released their debut album titled One Light Year at Snail Speed through EMI Pakistan.

In 2008, Sajid & Zeeshan performed at the Coke Studio Sessions with their song, "My Happiness", along with many other artists.

== Band members ==
Sajid & Zeeshan

- Sajid Ghafoor – vocals, harmonics, lead guitar (2003–present)
- Zeeshan Parwez – keyboards, synths (2003–present)

== Discography ==
Studio albums

- One Light Year at Snail Speed (2006)
- The Harvest (2011)

Singles

- "Freestyle Dive"
- "Have to Let Go Sometime"
- "King of Self"
- "My Happiness"
- "Lambay"

== Awards ==
- Finalists in the "Song of the Year" contest for 2004.
- The best "Foreign Language Song" category award at the 2nd Indus Music Awards.
- The "Best Music Video" category award at the 1st Indus Music Awards for "Freestyle Dive".
- Nominated at "The Musik Awards" for the "Best Video" category for "Freestyle Dive".
- Nominated at the "Lux Style Awards 2006" for the "Best Video" category for "Freestyle Dive".

== See also ==
- List of Pakistani music bands
