= Patari (service) =

Pakistani music streaming website

- Screenshot Screenshot of Patari for iOS.
- Company type: Private
- Available in: English; Urdu
- Founded: February 2015; 11 years ago
- Headquarters: Lahore, Punjab, Pakistan
- Country of origin: Pakistan
- Area served: Worldwide
- Founders: Khalid Bajwa; Humayun Haroon; Iqbal Talaat Bhatti
- Industry: Streaming on-demand media
- Website: patari.pk
- Registration: Optional
- Current status: Closed
- Native clients on: Windows; iOS; Android

Patari (Urdu: پٹاری) was a Pakistani music streaming service founded in February 2015 by Khalid Bajwa, Faisal Sherjan, Iqbal Talaat Bhatti and Humayun Haroon. The site provided Pakistani music and was known as the largest local music streaming service in Pakistan.

== History ==
=== Background ===
According to the chief creative officer of Patari, the initial plan was to create an online Pakistani drama serial portal. However, when this did not succeed, the Jang Group's Chief Strategy Officer Faisal Sherjan, encouraged Patari's founders to focus on music instead.

=== Launch ===
Patari was launched in February 2015 in beta version with a collection of 20,000 songs and 600 artists and was accessible only through invites and later by registration, which led to an increase in access across Pakistan. "We honestly just kept our heads down and kept working on it. Just another day in the life of a start-up we thought, and the next thing we knew, it was everywhere. People were sharing screenshots, making memes, trading tips on how to get invites and reaching out to us to tell us how much they love Pakistani music and Patari," said Khalid Bajwa. Patari was opened to public browsing on 4 September 2015.

=== Apps ===
Patari launched apps for iOS and Android in August 2015. It is planning to launch a Windows OS Windows Mobile app in the near future.

=== Funding ===
On 30 December 2016, Patari received a total amount of US$200,000 in seed funding from the investment firm Sarmayacar.

=== Weekly singles chart ===
Patari Haftanama is a Pakistani top 20 singles chart that is presented every Thursday at Patari.pk.

== Legal issues ==
In June 2015, EMI Pakistan requested Patari to remove all its content from the website as it held the licenses for over 60,000 Pakistani artists and controlled almost 70% of the total music of Pakistan. Zeeshan Chaudhry, General Manager of EMI Pakistan said: "I am not against Patari. I am against any portal or platform that provides illegal music." Patari and EMI have since resolved their differences and signed an agreement that places EMI on the Patari platform.

In April 2018, Patari co-founder and CEO Khalid Bajwa was accused of sexual harassment by several woman working at Patari leading to his resignation.
