= Kashan Admani =

Pakistani musician

- Born: Muhammad Kashan Admani; January 12, 1979 (age 47); Karachi, Pakistan
- Notable work: Acoustic Station; Coke Studio Season 9; Carma

Kashan Admani is a Pakistani musician, guitarist, composer, music producer, and filmmaker. He is the founder and lead guitarist of the rock band Mizmaar and the founder of Dream Station Productions.

== Early life ==
Admani began learning the keyboard as a child before transitioning to the guitar. During his school years, he started composing music and chose it as a full-time career.

== Career ==
=== Mizmaar ===
In 2000, Admani co-founded the Pakistani rock band Mizmaar. The band released its debut album Kash in 2003, followed by Sitara, which was released through Universal Music India.

=== Producer and session musician ===
Admani has produced music for numerous Pakistani musicians and commercial projects. He has collaborated with artists including Strings, Haroon, Palash Sen of Euphoria, Najam Sheraz, Usman Riaz, Aaroh, and Raeth.

In 2016, he joined the house band for the ninth season of Coke Studio Pakistan, where he performed alongside Faakhir Mehmood, Shuja Haider, Momina Mustehsan, Rahat Fateh Ali Khan and more.

=== Collaborative projects ===
In 2016, Admani produced and released "Jogi", a collaborative track with Indian vocalist Shubha Mudgal.

In 2019, Kashan produced "Taare", a song for supporting education that featured more than thirty musicians and actors.

In 2020, he composed and produced "We Are One / Aae Khuda", an international collaboration bringing together more than forty musicians from seven countries, including Grammy-winning and Grammy-nominated artists, as a message of solidarity during the COVID-19 pandemic.

=== Film career ===
Admani stepped into filmmaking with Carma, featuring Adnan Siddiqui, Zhalay, Naveen Waqar, and Osama Tahir in lead roles.

=== Acoustic Station ===
Admani launched Acoustic Station, an unplugged music web series, in 2019.

== Discography ==
=== With Mizmaar ===
- Kash (2003)
- Sitara

=== Solo and collaborative releases ===
- "Mein Hoon"
- "Mera Pyar" (tribute to Aamir Zaki)
- "Taare" (2019)
- "We Are One / Aae Khuda" (2020)

=== Acoustic Station ===
- "Sukh" - Kashmir
- "Sahibo" - Maha Ali Kazmi
- "Jee Loon" - Nida Hussain
- "Mujhe Maloom Hai" - Muhammad Zubair
- "Andaaz-e-Guftagoo" - Chand Tara Orchestra
- "Karde Karam" - Hamza Akram Qawwal
