= Kashmir (Pakistani band) =

Pakistani alternative rock band

Kashmir کشمیر
- Origin: Karachi, Sindh, Pakistan
- Genres: Alternative rock, pop rock, hard rock
- Years active: 2011–present
- Labels: Rearts
- Members: Bilal Ali; Usman Siddiqui; Vais Khan; Shane J. Anthony; Zair Zaki; Ali Raza
- Past members: Mashhad Sharyar; Hyder Ali
- Website: rearts.pk/artist/kashmir/

Kashmir (Urdu: کشمیر) is an alternative rock band from Karachi, Pakistan. It is the winning band of Pepsi Battle of the Bands Season 2 in 2017. Formed in 2012, the band played for various shows across the country prior to PBOB. The band consists of Bilal Ali (Vocalist), Vais Khan (lead guitarist), Usman Siddiqui (bass guitarist), Shane J. Anthoney (drummer), Zair Zaki (rhythm guitarist), and Ali Raza (keyboardist). The band has won Rs. 5 million, a music album contract, concerts across Pakistan and lifetime royalties on their music from the Battle of the Bands competition leaving the Badnaam Band as a runner-up. Kashmir Band won the Lux Style Award for Best Emerging Talent (Music) 2017 for their song "Kaaghaz Ka Jahaaz".

== Background ==
Over two months and seven (weekly) episodes on television and social media Pepsi Battle of the Bands ended with the trophy going to Kashmir, while the Sufi-rock band Badnaam were declared runners-up, in the final conclusion of the show on the basis of public votes.

== Post Pepsi Battle of the Band ==
After winning Pepsi Battle of the Band, Kashmir released "Pareshaaniyan" and "Khwab" on 10 and 11 May 2018 respectively on their YouTube and SoundCloud channel as a part of their upcoming album.

== Acoustic Station ==
Kashmir featured in the first episode of Acoustic Station produced by Kashan Admani at Dream Station Productions and performed a rendition of their song Soch.

== Discography ==
=== Pepsi Battle of the Bands ===
- Hamesha (EP cover)
- Mera Piyar (Aamir Zaki cover)
- Buddha Baba (Original)
- Waqt (EP cover)
- Faisaly (Original)
- Mendah Ishq (Sir Pathanay Khan cover)
- Soch (Original)
- Ankahi (Aadat (Atif Aslam)-Aitebar (Vital Signs) mashup/cover)
- Kaaghaz Ka Jahaz (Original)
- Parwana Hun (Original)

=== Studio albums ===
- Khwaab (2020)
- Zindagi (2023)

== Band members ==
Final Line-up

- Bilal Ali – vocals (2013–present)
- Vais Khan – lead guitar (2011–present)
- Usman Siddiqui – bass guitar (2011–present)
- Shane J. Anthoney – drums, percussion (2014–present)
- Zair Zaki – rhythm guitar (2012–present)
- Ali Raza – keyboard, backing vocals (2011–present)

Former Members

- Mashhad Shahryar - Lead Vocals (2011-2013)
- Hyder Ali - Drums (2013-2015)

== Awards and nominations ==
Year	Nominee / work	Award	Result
17th Lux Style Awards
2017	Kaaghaz Ka Jahaaz	Best Emerging Talent in Music	Won

== See also ==
- List of Pakistani music bands
