= Man Aamadeh Am =

1975 Persian song

Song by Googoosh

from the album Pol
- Language: Persian
- Released: 1978
- Genre: Persian pop music
- Length: 4:38
- Label: Taraneh Enterprise
- Songwriter: Jalil Zaland

"Man Aamadeh Am" (Persian: من آمده ام, lit. 'I have come to you') is a Persian song, sung by Iranian singer Googoosh for the album Pol in 1978. The song was written by Googoosh's Afghan friend Jalil Zaland and gifted to Googoosh after she visited Afghanistan.

== 2015 version ==
"Man Aamadeh Am"

Single by Atif Aslam and Gul Panra
- Language: Urdu, Persian
- Released: 29 August 2015
- Studio: Coke Studio
- Genre: Pakistani pop
- Length: 9:09
- Label: Coke Studio
- Songwriter: Jalil Zaland
- Producer: Strings

In 2015, Pakistani singers Atif Aslam and Gul Panra performed the song during Coke Studio season 8, episode 3. It was produced by Strings. The music video of the song features Atif Aslam and Gul Panra. It had received 37,000 shares on social media within five hours of its release. The video has received over 114 million views on YouTube as of November 2022.

=== Credits ===
- Artists – Atif Aslam and Gul Panra
- Composer – Jalil Zaland
- Producer – Strings
- Guest Musicians – Tanveer Tafu (Rubab), Arsalan Rabbani (Harmonium)
- Houseband – Aahad Nayani (Drums), Babar Khanna (Tabla/Dholak), Haider Ali (Keyboards), Imran Akhoond (Guitars), Jaffer Zaidi (Piano/String Section Arrangements), Omran Shafique (Guitars), Kamran 'mannu' Zafar (Bass), Sikandar Mufti (Percussions)
- String Section – Javed Iqbal, (Head Violinist), Islamuddin Meer (violin), Manzoor Ahmed (violin), Saeed Ahmed (violin)
- Backing Vocalists – Momin Durrani, Rachel Viccaji, Sara Haider
