= Najane Kyun =

Single by Strings

from the album Dhaani and Music from and Inspired by Spider-Man 2
- Released: 2004
- Recorded: 2002
- Genre: Pop
- Length: 5:10 (album version); 4:05 (video)
- Label: Sony BMG, Sadaf Stereo
- Songwriter: Anwar Maqsood
- Producer: Bilal Maqsood

"Najane Kyun" (Urdu: نہ جانے کیوں, literal English translation: "Don't Know Why?") is a song by Strings released on the 2004 soundtrack for the film Spider-Man 2. This track is on the Pakistani Urdu-language version of the soundtrack. The song is also featured on their fourth studio album, Dhaani, released in 2003.

== Background ==
In June 2004, before they could record their next song, "Najane Kyun", Strings were approached by the heads at Columbia TriStar Films of India, a sister company to their record label company, to include the song in the soundtrack of the Hindi version of the epic Hollywood blockbuster Spider-Man 2. With their massive presence in the Indian pop music scene, Strings were mistaken for an Indian band.

Soon afterward, they were approached by an Indian director shooting Zinda, a remake of the classic South Korean film Oldboy, to create a soundtrack. Maqsood composed a song titled "Zinda" for the movie. For the video, the duo had to act alongside two A-list actors from Bollywood. It was here that the duo became good friends with John Abraham and Sanjay Dutt and would later appear in more ventures together.

== Composition and music video ==
According to Bilal Maqsood, "Najane Kyun" explores themes of identity and internal conflict, reflecting the uncertainty experienced by Peter Parker over his responsibilities as Spider-Man. In June 2004, Strings members Maqsood and Faisal Kapadia travelled to Mumbai to film a music video for the song. The video was produced in connection with the film's Indian release and incorporated footage from Spider-Man 2 alongside appearances by the band.

== Track listing ==
Najane Kyun

All tracks are written by Strings.

No.	Title	Length
1.	"Najane Kyun"	5:10
2.	"Najane Kyun" (Video)	4:05
