= Koi Aanay Wala Hai (song) =

Single by Strings

from the album Koi Aanay Wala Hai
- Released: May 19, 2008
- Recorded: 2007
- Genre: Alternative rock
- Length: 4:30 (album version); 4:42 (video)
- Label: Sony BMG, Fire Records
- Songwriter: Anwar Maqsood
- Producer: Bilal Maqsood

Strings singles chronology
"Hum Hee Hum" (2007)	"Koi Aanay Wala Hai" (2008)	"Humsafar" (2008)

Koi Aanay Wala Hai (Urdu: کوئی آنے والا ہے, literal English translation: "someone is coming") is the fourth single by the pop band Strings from their fifth studio album, Koi Aanay Wala Hai (2008).

== Music video ==
The video starts off with both Strings members, Bilal Maqsood and Faisal Kapadia, performing and singing the song at the top of a building. Later on, John Abraham appears as an angel in the video following the female actor in the video. In the middle of the video, John Abraham lands on the surface with his wings wrapped around him and walks towards the female actor in the video. The angel's wings are shattered as they both get together and later the band is shown singing the song at the top of a building.

The basic concept of the video is, 'There is an angel watching over everyone.' John Abraham features as an angel who sights a beautiful girl in trouble. He falls in love with her and chooses to become human to be with her forever, similar to the concept of the film City of Angels.

The video was shot in Kuala Lumpur, Malaysia. Ad filmmaker and director of the video, Ravi Udyawar, has shot on 35 mm, utilising significant post-production, with the visual effects taking almost 3 months of work.

== Track listing ==
Koi Aanay Wala Hai

All tracks are written by Strings.

No.	Title	Length
1.	"Koi Aanay Wala Hai"	4:30
2.	"Koi Aanay Wala Hai" (Video)	4:42

== Charts ==
Chart	Peak position
Pakistani Singles Chart	1
Indian Singles Chart	1
