= Aahad Nayani =

Pakistani musician

Aahad Nayani احد نایانی
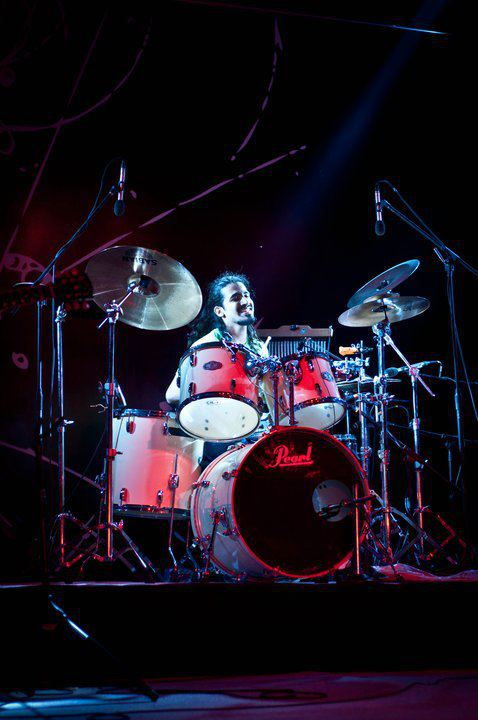

Background information
- Born: Karachi, Pakistan
- Genres: Pop rock; Pakistani rock
- Occupation: drummer
- Instruments: Drums; percussion
- Years active: 2010–present
- Labels: EMI

Aahad Nayani (Urdu: احد نایانی) is a Pakistani musician. He is known as one of the best drummers for the Pakistani pop rock band Strings and also for appearing in Coke Studio - Pakistan from season 7 to season 10.

== Early life ==
Nayani was born in Karachi, Pakistan. His father, Wahid Ali Nayani, a hobbyist, used to play drums at his house which ignited a passion in his son to be a drummer. Nayani learned drumming from his father. Nayani’s first drum kit was a second-hand Yamaha 1974 series, which he got at the age of 15.

He was playing drums with a Pakistani popular band (Strings Band)

== Career ==
=== Early career ===
Nayani played many underground gigs pre-2010. It was when the situation in the country got worst due to increasing terrorism that the music scene went into decline with many other band members from different bands moving out to foreign countries. With the decline of the music scene in the country, Nayani opted for ACCA where he was invited to the studio to record drums for an album for Ayesha Omer.

=== Strings ===
Nayani took part in a show called Azm-i-Alishan, judged by Strings. On the fifth day of the show, Bilal Maqsood, lead-guitarist and vocalist of Strings, asked Nayani to play with them on a session. Since joining Strings in 2010, Nayani has been extensively touring with them and fulfilling his dream of playing at Berklee College of Music. Strings upcoming album 30 will be Nayani’s first studio album.

== Personal life ==
Nayani had a passion for drums since a very young age, as he was inspired by Mike Portnoy of Dream Theater, Dennis Chambers, and Steve Smith of Journey. Nayani is the first Pakistani drummer to become the brand ambassador for Vater Percussion and Mapex Drums.

== Discography ==
Coke Studio - Pakistan

- Season 7 (2014)
- Season 8 (2015)
- Season 9 (2016)
- Season 10 (2017)
