= Zubaida Tariq =

Pakistani chef and cooking expert (1945–2018)

- Born: 4 April 1945; Hyderabad, Hyderabad State, British India
- Died: 4 January 2018 (aged 72); Karachi, Sindh, Pakistan
- Burial place: Karachi, Pakistan
- Other name: Zubaida Aapa
- Occupations: Chef, cooking expert, health advisor
- Years active: 1945–2018
- Spouse: Tariq Maqsood (m. 1966)
- Children: 2
- Relatives: Bahadur Yar Jung (uncle); Anwar Maqsood (brother); Fatima Surayya Bajia (sister); Zehra Nigah (sister); Bilal Maqsood (nephew)

Zubaida Tariq (Urdu: زبیدہ طارق; 4 April 1945– 4 January 2018), commonly known as Zubaida Aapa (Urdu: زبیدہ آپا), was a Pakistani chef, herbalist, and cooking expert. She was the first celebrity cook of Pakistan, appearing on numerous TV shows, and was also known for her totkas (lifehacks).

== Career ==
Tariq first started cooking when she and her husband hosted dinner parties at their home, and it was at one of these parties where she was offered a job at a food advisory service by a guest who was impressed with her cooking skills. Tariq went on to become popular in the 1990s when she became part of the cooking show Dalda ka Dastarkhawan.

She starred in her own cooking show Handi on Hum Masala and appeared on several other TV shows as a guest. Tariq worked with and appeared on ARY Digital, Sajid Hussain, Nadia, Kiran, FM 107, Kitchen Magic and Aaj Ke Bhao. Tariq was also well known for her home remedies or totkas, and ran a restaurant with her son Hussain Tariq.

== Personal life ==
Zubaida Tariq was born on 4 April 1945 in Hyderabad Deccan, British India. Her family migrated to Pakistan in 1947. They settled in Karachi, PIB Colony, where she lived with her five older sisters and 4 brothers. In 1953, her father died. After the death of father, three of her sisters took responsibility for running the house. In 1966, Zubaida wed a first cousin, Tariq Maqsood, whom she first met in 1954. They had two children. She died on 4 January 2018 at 72, after a long ailment. The death was confirmed by her brother, Anwar Maqsood on his Twitter handle. The funeral was held at Sultan Mosque in the city's Defence area following Friday prayers.

== Family ==
Originally from Hyderabad, British India, and settled in Karachi, Zubaida was born into a prominent Urdu-speaking family known for producing littérateurs, intellectuals and artists. Her maternal grand-uncle was Bahadur Yar Jung, a Muslim nationalist of the Indian subcontinent.

She had ten other siblings, the most notable of whom include sisters Fatima Surayya Bajia (an Urdu novelist and playwright) and Zehra Nigah (an Urdu poet) and brother Anwar Maqsood (a poet, humorist, writer and entertainer). A nephew Bilal Maqsood (Anwar's son) is a vocalist and guitarist for the pop rock band "Strings".

== Medical health ==
She died on 4 January 2018, aged 72, from heart failure.
