= Ab Khud Kuch Karna Paray Ga =

2010 single by Atif Aslam and Strings

Single by Strings and Atif Aslam
- Released: 16 July 2010
- Recorded: 2010
- Genre: Alternative rock
- Length: 3:55 (single); 4:03 (video)
- Label: 2 Republic Music Group
- Songwriter: Bilal Maqsood
- Producer: Bilal Maqsood

Strings and Atif Aslam singles chronology
"Titliyan" (2009)	"Ab Khud Kuch Karna Paray Ga" (2010)	"Mein Tou Dekhoonga" (2011)

"Ab Khud Kuch Karna Paray Ga" (Note: Urdu: اب خود کچھ کرنا پڑے گا, pronounced [ɐb ˈxuːd̪ kʊtʃʰ ˈkɐɾnaː ˈpɐɽeː gaː]; lit. "Now We Must Do Something Overselves") (Urdu: اب خود کچھ کرنا پڑے گا, lit. 'Will have to do something ourselves now') is a single from the Pakistani pop rock band Strings featuring former Jal vocalist Atif Aslam, released on 16 July 2010 by 2 Republic Music Group. The song is written and produced by Bilal Maqsood.

== Music video ==
The video starts off showing several clips of violence going on and then as the music starts several camera shots of Strings band members, Faisal Kapadia and Bilal Maqsood are shown along with Atif Aslam. Later on, Faisal and Atif are shown singing the song along with several clips of violence and corruption happening in Pakistan. Bilal is playing the guitar along with numerous camera shots showing Faisal and Atif singing the song. In the middle of the video, many shots are shown of violence, corrupt leaders and the band along with Atif are shown several times. Then the band and Atif Aslam are shown at the top a building singing the song. At the end, a child with a lightened oil lamp is shown as a sign of hope and at the very end Pakistan's flag is shown.

The music video is directed by Jamshed Mehmood (Jami) and is produced by azadfilms co.

== Track listing ==
All tracks are written by Strings.

No.	Title	Length
1.	"Ab Khud Kuch Karna Paray Ga"	3:55
2.	"Ab Khud Kuch Karna Paray Ga" (Video)	4:03

== Charts ==
Chart	Peak position
Pakistani Singles Chart	1
