= Coke Studio Pakistan season 8 =

Eighth television season of Coke Studio (Pakistani TV series)

Coke Studio Pakistan
- Season 8
- Season 8 logo
- Starring: Vocalists
- No. of episodes: 7

Release
- Original network: Webcast
- Original release: 16 August – 4 October 2015

Season chronology
- ← Previous; Season 7 Next → Season 9

The eighth season of the Pakistani music television series Coke Studio Pakistan premiered on 16 August 2015 and aired its finale on 4 October 2015. It aired a weekly episode every Sunday on various channels across Pakistan. The season was revived under the tagline of The Sound of Nation.

The debut producers of season 7, Strings duo and series regular producer Coca-Cola, continued their journey as producers in this season. Earlier, rumours were made that Rohail Hyatt would be back as a producer this season but he denied rumors saying "Just for the record, I'm not producing the next season of Coke Studio Pakistan (2015)....... I would like to produce my 7th season of Coke Studio one day. I hope this clears any confusion".

The lead bassist, Khalid Khan, was ruled out of season 8 due to cervical pain; he was replaced by Kamran 'Mannu' Zafar. The season featured seven episodes comprising thirty-one artists, thirteen musicians and twenty-eight songs.

== Artists ==
=== Vocalists ===
Following is the list of thirty-one featured artists line-up, including six bands, that will perform as individuals, duos and with chorus:

- Ali Azmat
- Ali Haider
- Ali Sethi
- Ali Zafar
- Alycia Dias
- Anwar Maqsood
- Arif Lohar
- Asim Azhar
- Atif Aslam
- Bakshi Brothers
- Farida Khanum
- Fizza Javed
- Gul Panra
- Kavish
- Karam Abbas
- Mai Dhai
- Malang Party
- Mekaal Hasan Band
- Mulazim Hussain
- Nabeel Shaukat Ali
- Nafees Ahmed
- Qurat-ul-Ain Balouch
- Rizwan & Muazzam
- Samra Khan
- Sara Haider
- Sara Raza Khan
- Shazia Manzoor
- Shehroze Hussan
- Siege
- Surriya Khanum
- Umair Jaswal
- Ustad Hamid Ali Khan
Note: Anwar Maqsood is the only featured artist who served as a narrator of his own poem specially written for the song "Chirya Da Chamba".

=== Musicians ===
Almost all the Musician House Band returns to season 8 except Khalid Khan who left the show due to health problem and was replaced by Kamran Mannu Zafar, while pianist Jaffar Zaidi of Kavish also served as a lead vocalist for the first time. Only Sajid Ali returned as a guest musician for this season. For season 8, following is the list of backing vocalist that serves vocal harmony with the lead vocalist. Sara Haider and Rachel return to season 8 as a backing singer, with Sara also appeared as a featured artist. Following are the lists of featured line-up musicians:

House Band
- Dholak & Tabla: Babar Ali Khanna
- Drums: Aahad Nayani
- Bass: Kamran 'Mannu' Zafar
- Guitars: Imran Akhoond & Omran 'Momo' Shafique
- Keyboard: Haider Ali
- Bass: Khalid Khan
- Percussion: Sikandar Mufti
- Piano and Synthesizer: Jaffer Ali Zaidi

Backing Vocals
- Momin Durrani
- Rachel Viccaji
- Sara Haider

Guest Musicians
- Flute: Sajid Ali
- Harmonium: Arsalan Ali
- Rubab: Tanveer Tafu

String Section
- Islamuddin Meer
- Javed Iqbal
- Manzoor Ahmed
- Saeed Ahmed

Note: Haider Ali is a singer-songwriter, and an art director, also recognized as haidertonight, and known for appearing on the (Season 8, Episode 1) of the Coke Studio on 16 August 2015.

== Production ==
The series was produced under Strings's production company MainStage Productions and was distributed by Coca-Cola Pakistan. Speaking at the launch of Coke Studio Season 8, Bilal Maqsood and Faisal Kapadia of Strings said:

Last Season was an incredible experience for us and we are extremely excited to be producing yet another season of Coke Studio, this season we take it to the next level with one of the most diverse artist line up in the history of the show. With a total of 31 featured artists, 13 musicians and 28 songs, Coke Studio is indeed The Sound of the Nation.

— Strings, producer Coke Studio

General Manager of Coca-Cola Pakistan, Rizwan U. Khan said,

“In last 7 years, Coke Studio has made an undeniably positive mark on Pakistani music landscape. At Coca-Cola we pride ourselves on being at the forefront of new and dynamic innovations, and we can say with confidence that Coke Studio is precisely that. With this season, our aim is to reinvent the way music can capture the spirit of Pakistan.”

== Episodes ==
On 4 August 2015, a special tribute to Sohail Rana and Masroor Anwar was presented by reproducing their patriotic song "Sohni Dharti" as a part of Pakistan's 68th Independence celebration. Season also released the promo with the tribute under the tagline of 'Celebrating the spirit of Independence'. "Sohni Dharti" featured all the artists that were scheduled to lined-up for this season. The promo and tribute release were met with extravagant reception from all over the world. "Sohni Dharti" went viral with in 24-hours of it release, earning wide spread acclaim. The song was declared as "the best of what Coke Studio has ever offered".

No. overall	Song Title	Artist(s)	Language(s)	Original release date
Season Opener
-	"Sohni Dharti"	Season's Vocalists	Urdu	4 August 2015
Episode 1
37	"Aankharli Pharookai"	Karam Abbas & Mai Dhai	Braj, Marwari & Punjabi	16 August 2015
37	"Bewajah"	Nabeel Shaukat Ali	Urdu	16 August 2015
37	"Sayon"	Mekaal Hasan Band	Punjabi	16 August 2015
37	"Tajdar-e-Haram"	Atif Aslam	Arabic, Braj, Persian & Urdu	16 August 2015
Episode 2
38	"Sakal Ban"	Rizwan & Muazzam Ali Khan	Braj	22 August 2015
38	"Sammi Meri Waar"	Qurat-ul-Ain Balouch & Umair Jaswal	Punjabi & Urdu	22 August 2015
38	"Chiryan da Chamba"	Suraiya Khanum & Anwar Maqsood	Punjabi & Urdu	22 August 2015
38	"Rockstar"	Ali Zafar	English, Punjabi & Urdu	22 August 2015
Episode 3
39	"Man Aamadeh Am"	Atif Aslam & Gul Panra	Persian & Urdu	29 August 2015
39	"Umran Langiyaan"	Ali Sethi & Nabeel Shaukat Ali	Siraiki & Punjabi	29 August 2015
39	"Neun La Leya"	Kaavish	Punjabi	29 August 2015
39	"Rung Jindri"	Arif Lohar	Punjabi	29 August 2015
Episode 4
40	"Rabba Ho"	Mulazim Hussain	Punjabi & Urdu	5 September 2015
40	"Khari Neem"	Siege	Marwari & Urdu	5 September 2015
40	"Piya Dehkan Ko"	Nafees Ahmed Khan & Ustad Hamid Ali Khan	Braj	5 September 2015
40	"Ae Dil"	Ali Zafar & Sara Haider	English & Urdu	5 September 2015
Episode 5
41	"Hina Ki Khushbu"	Asim Azhar & Samra Khan	Punjabi & Urdu	13 September 2015
41	"Khalis Makhan"	Bakhshi Brothers	Punjabi	13 September 2015
41	"Kinaray"	Mekaal Hasan Band	Urdu	13 September 2015
41	"Rangeela"	Ali Azmat	Urdu	13 September 2015
Episode 6
42	"Ve Baneya"	Fizza Javed & Mulazim	Punjabi & Urdu	19 September 2015
42	"Hare Hare Baans"	Rizwan, Muazzam & Shazia Manzoor	Awadhi	19 September 2015
42	"Jiya Karay"	Sara Raza & Ali Haider	Urdu	19 September 2015
42	"Kadi Aao N"	Atif Aslam & Mai Dhai	Punjabi & Urdu	19 September 2015
Episode 7
43	"Armaan"	Alycia Dias & Siege	Urdu	3 October 2015
43	"Ajj Din Vehre Vich"	Ali Zafar	Punjabi & Urdu	3 October 2015
43	"Dil Jale"	Malang Party	Urdu	3 October 2015
43	"Aaj Jaane Ki Zid Na Karo"	Farida Khanum	Urdu	3 October 2015

== Reception ==
Season 8 became one of the most successful seasons of all time, earning the title of "Best of Coke Studio has ever Offered". Many songs became the headlines of newspapers and media outlets including Atif Aslam's rendition of the popular qawwali "Tajdar-e-Haram" as a tribute to its original performers, the Sabri Brothers. The rendition received an overwhelmingly positive response and the track gained over 241 million views on YouTube. Despite achieving critical success many media outlets and viewers praised the original version by Sabri's and criticized Atif diction to the song, Amjad Sabri the son of Ghulam Farid Sabri says, "I really like how the music was arranged. Atif didn't do badly. I wish he could have worked on his diction a little more, as long as the essence remains untouched, there is no harm." He further said, "it was an honest accolade to his father and uncle". Imane Babar Wahedi of Express Tribune declared Nabeel Shaukat Ali's song "Bewajah" the Coke Studio's best production so far. She said "Nabeel Ali's composition and voice quality are the backbone of the song; his extraordinary vocals literally gave goose bumps. Haider Ali's guitar riff on the keyboard complements the composition extremely well."

Episode two was the most successful episode . Ali Zafar marked his appearance with "Rockstar" (the only original song in episode 2), after six years of a gap from the show. The song received highly critical acclaims for its variation in vocals, jazzy tune and freedom of lyrics and was praised by Many media celebrities and personalities including Hrithik Roshan, Mahira Khan, Fahad Mustafa, Imran Khan and Adnan Sami. On the success of "Rockstar" Ali stated that, "I partly lead the rockstar life I've made fun of." He explains that, "The lyrics of the song remind me of how I used to perceive rockstars when I was a kid. There's an aspect of vanity and arrogance 'Rockstar' which required me to get more animated." The folk-song "Sammi Meri Waar" by Umair Jaswal and QB was heavily criticized for the poor coordination and presence. The duo were called "ridiculously photogenic" and media outlets lambasted Coke Studio's first negotiation with a folk song. Tufail Niazi's hit wedding song "Chirya Da Chamba" by Surriya Khanam and Anwar Maqsood was praised for its music, composition and the beautiful narration of a letter by Maqsood. It was stated that the song "created a memorable experience for audiences."

The third episodes mark the debut of Pakhtun singer Gul Panra in Lollywood, who sang a Persian duet "Man Aamadeh Am" with Atif Aslam. The song went viral and was viewed more than 37, 000 times in five hours. Panra received highly positive acclaim and recognition in her debut in season eight. Arif Lohar's "Rung Jindri" was also met with positive response. The News Tribe wrote "his [Arif Lohar] song lift up the Coke Studio to another peak of fame."

The fourth episode was also reviewed positively, Ali Raj of The Express Tribune gave three and half stars out of five by saying, "The episode reflects the good, the bad and the largely ugly of an approach that is seemingly here to stay."

Episode five also garnered positive reviews. The release of Ali Azmat's song "Rangeela" was widely praised The second song from episode "Hina Ki kushboo" by Samra Khan and Asim Azhar, with a fusion of Nusrat Fateh Ali Khan's qawali "Kina Sona Tenu" aimed as a tribute to Noor Jahan received mixed to positive reception from media outlets.

Episode six saw the third appearance of Atif Aslam who sang Marwari duet "Kadi Ao Ni" with folk singer Mai Dhai. Singer Shazia Manzoor appeared in CS for the first time singing a qawali with duo Rizwan & Muazzam. Fiza Javed who briefly appeared in season one of Pakistan Idol appeared first time on national television with singer Mulazim Hussain, performing a duet of Reshma's song "Meri Hamjoliyaan". The episode ended with "Jiya Karay" by Ali Haider and Sara Raza Khan. Haider also appeared on both CS and television after a long gap.

Episode seven marked the season finale and its reception was highly positive. Specially the appearance of Farida Khanum was the highlight of episode. Khanum appeared on national television screens after a significant gap. In the finale episode she sang her most popular ghazal "Aaj Jaane Ki Zid Na Karo". Strings even went on to thank her in the opening monologue of song saying, "We would like to thank Farida Khanum Sahiba for accepting our request and gracing Coke Studio with her presence." ARY News praised the rendition saying, "Finally a reason to watch Coke Studio: Farida Khanum singing 'Aaj Jane Ki Zidd Na Karo'." Besides Khanum, Ali Zafar's third appearance to sing "Aj Din Vehre Vich" originally written by Shahnawaz Zaidi received positive reviews The Nation wrote, "With this season of Coke Studio, Ali has proved that he is an all-rounder. Just like he has essayed different types of characters in his films across the border, in his music also Ali has reaffirmed his versatility like no other artist of his generation, which is on ample display in Coke Studio." The other songs by Alycia Dias, Malang Party and Siege were also praised.

== See also ==
- Coke Studio (India)
