= Imran Muhammad Akhoond =

Pakistani guitarist and music producer

Imran Akhoond
- Also known as: Imran Muhammad Akhoond
- Born: عمران محمد اخوند; Karachi, Sindh Province of Pakistan
- Genres: Blues rock
- Occupations: Musician, guitarist
- Instruments: Vocals, guitar
- Years active: 1990–present
- Member of: Shehzad Roy, Awaz, Strings
- Website: http://imranakhoond.com/

Imran Muhammad Akhoond is a Pakistani guitarist and session musician. He is best-known as the lead guitarist (1998 to present) in the band of Pakistani pop/rock singer Shehzad Roy. He has performed with various other bands, including Junaid Jamshed, Strings and Vital Signs.

From 2013 to 2017, Akhoond was a member of the house band on Pakistani music show Coke Studio, before switching to act as a mentor on Pepsi Battle of the Bands in 2018.

== Early life ==
Imran Akhoond was born in Karachi, into a Gujarati-speaking family.

== Music career ==
Akhoond entered the music business in 1997 as the guitarist in the live backing band of Junaid Jamshed, who he met through Nadeem Jafri. He also performed as a session musician with Awaz, Hadiqa Kiani, Ali Zafar, and Strings.

Akhoond became a permanent member of Shehzad Roy's band in 1998, having met him while on tour with Awaz. In 2013 he performed with Shehzad Roy alongside guitarist Slash and drummer Matt Sorum of Guns N' Roses at a charity event in Los Angeles.

He released his debut solo single "Madhur" in 2012, and his second single "Inside Love" in 2015.

== Television work ==
Akhoond was the guitarist in the house band on the music show Coke Studio, from season 7 until 10 (2014-2017), which were produced by Strings.

In 2018 he moved to work with Shahi Hasan of Vital Signs as a judge and mentor on seasons 3 and 4 of Pepsi Battle of the Bands.

== Other ventures ==
In 2020, Akhoond appeared on "We Are One", a collaborative song made by artists from seven countries as a message of hope during the COVID-19 pandemic, produced by Kashan Admani.

== Influences ==
Akhoond is a fan of Bryan Adams, and cites as his guitar influences Eric Clapton, David Gilmour, Eric Johnson and Larry Carlton.

== Personal life ==
Akhoond and his family are long-term residents of Gulshan-e-Iqbal, Karachi.

Akhoond performed Hajj, along with Shehzad Roy, in July 2006.

On 16 January 2019, Akhoond was stopped by unknown persons while driving with his family in the Buffer Zone district of Karachi. The assailants threatened Akhoond, stating that his music television work was considered haraam and against the spirit of Islam. Following the threats, Akhoond was reported to be avoiding social engagements out of fear for his life.

== Discography ==
- 1999 – Shehzad Roy Teri soorat Album
- 2002 – Shehzad Roy Rab Janey Album
- 2005 – Shehzad Roy Buri Baat hai Album
- 2008 – Shehzad Roy Qismat Apne Haath Mein Album
- 2008 – Shafqat Amanat Ali Tabeer Album
- 2008 – Strings Koi Aany Wala Hai Album
- 2010 – Atif Aslam & Strings Ab khud kuch karna paray ga
- 2011 – Ali Azmat Josh-ejunoon
- 2013 – Rahat Nusrat Fateh Ali Khan Malaal ( Movie Song )
- 2014 – Ali Zafar – Nahi Maloom ( Movie Song )
- 2015 – Moor(film) Guitar Scoring Background & Songs ( Produced by Strings )
- 2016 – Actor in Law Guitar Scoring Background & Songs Produced by Shani Arshad )
- 2017 – Shehzad Roy PSL Official Song Balle Balle )
- 2017 – Shehzad Roy PSL Official Anthem Dan Dhana Dhan )
- 2018 – Shahi Hasan Song Maula Pepsi Battle of the Bands Season 3 Episode 8 )
- 2018 – Shehzad Roy PSL Official Song Lo Phir Se Miley )
- 2018 – Shehzad Roy Karachi Kings Official Anthem Song De Dhana Dhan )
- 2019 – Shehzad Roy Karachi Kings Official Anthem Song De Dhana Dhan )
- 2019 – Shehzad Roy Official Song Socho Phir Se Zara for Supreme Court Symposium Produced by )
- 2020 – Kashan Admani Enlisted top musical talent from all over the world for a new song 'We Are One'[26] features 40 musicians from all over the world including Grammy Award winners Global Collaboration
