= Mein Tou Dekhoonga =

Single by Strings
- Released: 4 April 2011
- Recorded: March 2011
- Genre: Pop rock, classical
- Length: 4:09 (single); 4:52 (video)
- Label: EMI Pakistan
- Songwriter: Bilal Maqsood
- Producer: Bilal Maqsood

Strings singles chronology
"Ab Khud Kuch Karna Paray Ga" (2010)	"Mein Tou Dekhoonga" (2011)

"Mein Tou Dekhoonga" (Note: Urdu: میں تو دیکھونگا, romanized: Maiñ Tu Dekhūnga, pronounced [mɛ̃ː t̪uː ˈd̪eːkʰuːŋɡaˑ]; lit. "I Will See It") is a sociopolitical single from the Pakistani pop rock band Strings, released on 4 April 2011. The song is written and produced by the band founder, lead guitarist and vocalist Bilal Maqsood. The music video of the single "Mein Tou Dekhoonga" is directed by Jamshed Mehmood.

== Music video ==
The music video is directed by Jamshed Mehmood (Jami) and is produced by Azadfilms co.

== Track listing ==
All tracks are written by Strings.

No.	Title	Length
1.	"Mein Tou Dekhoonga"	4:09
2.	"Mein Tou Dekhoonga" (With kids)	4:14
3.	"Mein Tou Dekhoonga" (Video)	4:52
