= Strings (Strings album) =

Studio album by Strings
- Released: May 13, 1990
- Recorded: 1989–1990 at EMI Studios, Karachi, Pakistan
- Genre: Pop rock
- Length: 58:52
- Label: EMI
- Producer: Strings

Strings chronology
| Strings (1990) | 2 (1992) |

Singles from Strings
- 1. "Jab Se Tumko" Released: 1990; 2. "Duniya Walon"; 3. "Lori"

Strings is the debut album of the Pakistani pop band Strings, released in the year 1990. The album was recorded at the EMI Studios in Karachi and was produced by lead guitarist Bilal Maqsood. Singles from the album included "Pyar Se Phir", "Yeh Hai Pyar Ka Saman" and "Jab Se Tum Ko".

== Track listing ==
All songs are written by Anwar Maqsood, those which are not are mentioned below. All songs are composed by Bilal Maqsood.

Strings
| No. | Title | Writer(s) | Length |
|---|---|---|---|
| 1. | "Pyar Se Phir" | | 4:39 |
| 2. | "Mein Ne Tujhe" | Bilal Maqsood, Zain Hamidi | 5:21 |
| 3. | "Pyasi Zameen" | | 6:17 |
| 4. | "Mein Hoon Tujhse" | | 3:52 |
| 5. | "Teri Aankhon Mein" | | 5:52 |
| 6. | "Jab Se Tumko" | | 5:09 |
| 7. | "Malida" | | 5:06 |
| 8. | "Duniya Walon" | | 1:24 |
| 9. | "Chandni Raat" | | 4:33 |
| 10. | "Lori" | | 3:21 |
| 11. | "Pakistan" | | 4:40 |
| 12. | "Khilona" | Zain Hamidi | 5:20 |
| 13. | "Yeh Hai Pyar Ka Saman" | | 4:07 |
| 14. | "Tum To Meri Zindagi Ho" | | 4:52 |

== Personnel ==
All information is taken from the CD.

Strings

- Faisal Kapadia - vocals, backing vocals
- Bilal Maqsood - vocals, lead guitars
- Rafiq Wazir Ali - keyboard, synthesizer
- Kareem Bashir Bhoy - bass guitars

Production

- Produced by Bilal Maqsood
- Recorded & Mixed at EMI Studios in Karachi, Pakistan
