= Duur =

Studio album by Strings
- Released: January 21, 2000 (Cassette); September 21, 2000 (CD); January 1, 2001 (India)
- Recorded: 1999–2000 at NL Studio in Karachi, Pakistan
- Genre: Pop; Rock
- Length: 57:53
- Label: Sound Master, Magnasound
- Producer: Strings, Nizar Lalani, Shahzad Hasan

Strings chronology
2 (1992)	Duur (2000)	Dhaani (2003)

Alternative cover

Singles from Duur
- 1. "Duur" Released: 21 January 2000; 2. "Ankhain" Released: 19 June 2000; 3. "Anjane" Released: 1 January 2001; 4. "O' Jane Wale"

Professional ratings
Review scores
Source	Rating
Allmusic	4/5 stars

Duur (Urdu: دور, literal English translation: "far") is the third album by the Pakistani pop band Strings, first released on 21 January 2000 in Pakistan and then on 1 January 2001 in India. Singles from the album were Duur, Anjane, and Aankhain.

The album was a result of the band's comeback into the Pakistani pop scene after a hiatus of eight years. Originally a quartet, the band decided to continue with only two of its former members. The album was poetically named ‘duur’ meaning ‘far’ in Urdu to depict their journey restarted, towards a goal that they see from afar.

== Background ==
Strings began as a quartet led by Faisal Kapadia and Bilal Maqsood, accompanied by Rafiq Wazir Ali and Kareem Bashir Bhoy. The four disbanded in 1992 to continue their studies. While Kapadia went to Houston, Texas to continue business studies, Maqsood joined an art school and later joined an advertising agency as an art director. Upon his return from the USA, Kapadia joined Maqsood at the firm he was working at.

Maqsood had sold his guitar and thoughts of getting into music occasionally crossed his mind. It was when Maqsood composed a tune for a song humming the word duur with it that Kapadia realised they should reform the band. Both had married, both had jobs. Kapadia even had a family business. Leaving all to satisfy their passion for music was hard. Upon consultation amongst themselves and friends from the music industry, especially Rohail Hyatt of the band Vital Signs, the two re-formed the band. They tried to approach Rafiq and Kareem but they declined as they had settled well in their new lives.

Thus the band was reincarnated and Maqsood asked his good friend Jamshed Mehmood to direct a video for their first song, Duur. By mid-2000, the song hit the airwaves and became an instant hit with fans.

== Track listing ==
All songs are written by Anwar Maqsood except those mentioned below.

Duur
No.	Title	Writer(s)	Length
1.	"Sar Kiye Yeh Pahar"	Bilal Maqsood	5:43
2.	"Duur"		5:03
3.	"Kuch To Ho Gaya"	Zehra Nigah	4:05
4.	"Anjane"		4:39
5.	"O' Jane Wale"		4:19
6.	"Aankhain"		4:53
7.	"Duur (Reprise)"		5:08
8.	"Main Ne Tujhe"	Bilal Maqsood	6:11
9.	"Jaane Du"		5:00
10.	"Khirki"		5:06
11.	"Khwaab"		3:53
12.	"Sar Kiye Yeh Pahar (Karaoke)"		5:13

== Personnel ==
All information is taken from the CD.

Strings

- Faisal Kapadia: lead vocals
- Bilal Maqsood: vocals, lead guitar

Additional musicians

- Vocals: Mikail Maqsood (Duur Reprise)
- Flute: Rahat
- Guitars: Shallum Asher Xavier, Nabeel Nihal Chishty & Faraz Anwar

Production

- Produced by Strings, Nizar Lalani & Shahzad Hasan
- Recorded at NL Studios & Pyramid Productions, Sindh, Karachi
- Mixing: Shahzad Hasan & Ehtashamulhaq
- Engineer: Nizar Lalani, Ishaq & Ehtashamulhaq
- Keyboards engineer: Faizi
- Art direction & design: Jami & Shariq Mushir
