= 2 (Strings album) =

Studio album by Strings
- Released: 30 July 1992
- Recorded: 1991–1992 at Karachi, Pakistan
- Genre: Pop rock
- Label: Shalimar Recording Company
- Producer: Strings

Strings chronology
| Strings (1990) | 2 (1992) | Duur (2000) |

Singles from 2
- 1. "Jadoo" Released: 1991; 2. "Aaj Mein Khud He Se" Released: August 19, 1992; 3. "Sar Kiye Yeh Pahar" Released: 1992; 4. "Main Ne Tumse" Released: 1992

2 is the second studio album by Pakistani pop rock band Strings. Singles from the album included "Sar Kiye Yeh Pahar" and "Aaj Mein Khud He Se". It was the sequel of String's first album two years later.

== Release ==
In 1992, the band developed a follow-up album titled 2, released by Shalimar Recording Company. Maqsood, realising that the band needed more exposure, advised that a music video to be shot. He himself took charge of the direction of the video for the song "Sar Kiye Yeh Pahar" and handed it to the STN to be aired on their show. The video was played for a minute on the channel in their hour-long show, and with not many new videos from competing artists, Maqsood's directorial début was an instant success. This decision proved beneficial and "Sar Kiye Yeh Pahar" became a nationwide hit overnight. In its most primitive form, the video and the song created a phenomenon in the local music industry and the band scored hits after another, played shows and enjoyed the lifestyle of the post-80s pop stars. The hype was short-lived as the quartet decided to disband considering it as a mutual decision amongst all the members. Soon afterwards, as the band disappeared from the local pop music scene their video of "Sar Kiye Yeh Pahar" aired on MTV Asia and led the band to achieve success and worldwide fame.

After disbanding, Maqsood joined an art school and later got himself a job in an advertising agency as the creative director, while Kapadia travelled to the Houston, Texas to continue his business studies. Little is known of the other two members of the band but it is understood they continued their studies as well. The disbanding of the group came as a mutual decision amongst all the members.

== Track listing ==
All lyrics are written by Anwar Maqsood except where noted; all music is composed by Bilal Maqsood

2
| No. | Title | Length |
|---|---|---|
| 1. | "Sar Kiye Yeh Pahar" (writer: Bilal Maqsood) | 6:02 |
| 2. | "Jab Bhi Mein" |
| 3. | "Dil Ki Kahani" |
| 4. | "Aaj Din Bhar" |
| 5. | "Jab Bhi Kisi Mausam Mein" |
| 6. | "Sahaara" |
| 7. | "Jadoo" |
| 8. | "Raaz Jo Aankhon Mein" |
| 9. | "Palkain Teri" |
| 10. | "Koshish Karo" |
| 11. | "Aaj Mein Khud He Se" |
| 12. | "Main Ne Tumse" | 4:39 |
| 13. | "Yeh Hai Pyar Ka Saman" |
| 14. | "Uttho Baita" |

== Personnel ==
All information is taken from the CD.

Strings

- Faisal Kapadia – vocals, backing vocals
- Bilal Maqsood – vocals, lead guitars
- Rafiq Wazir Ali – keyboard, synthesizer
- Kareem Bashir Bhoy – bass guitars

Production

- Produced by Bilal Maqsood
- Recorded & Mixed in Karachi, Pakistan
