= Roman Miroshnichenko =

Ukraine-born Russian guitarist and composer

Roman Miroshnichenko Роман Мирошниченко
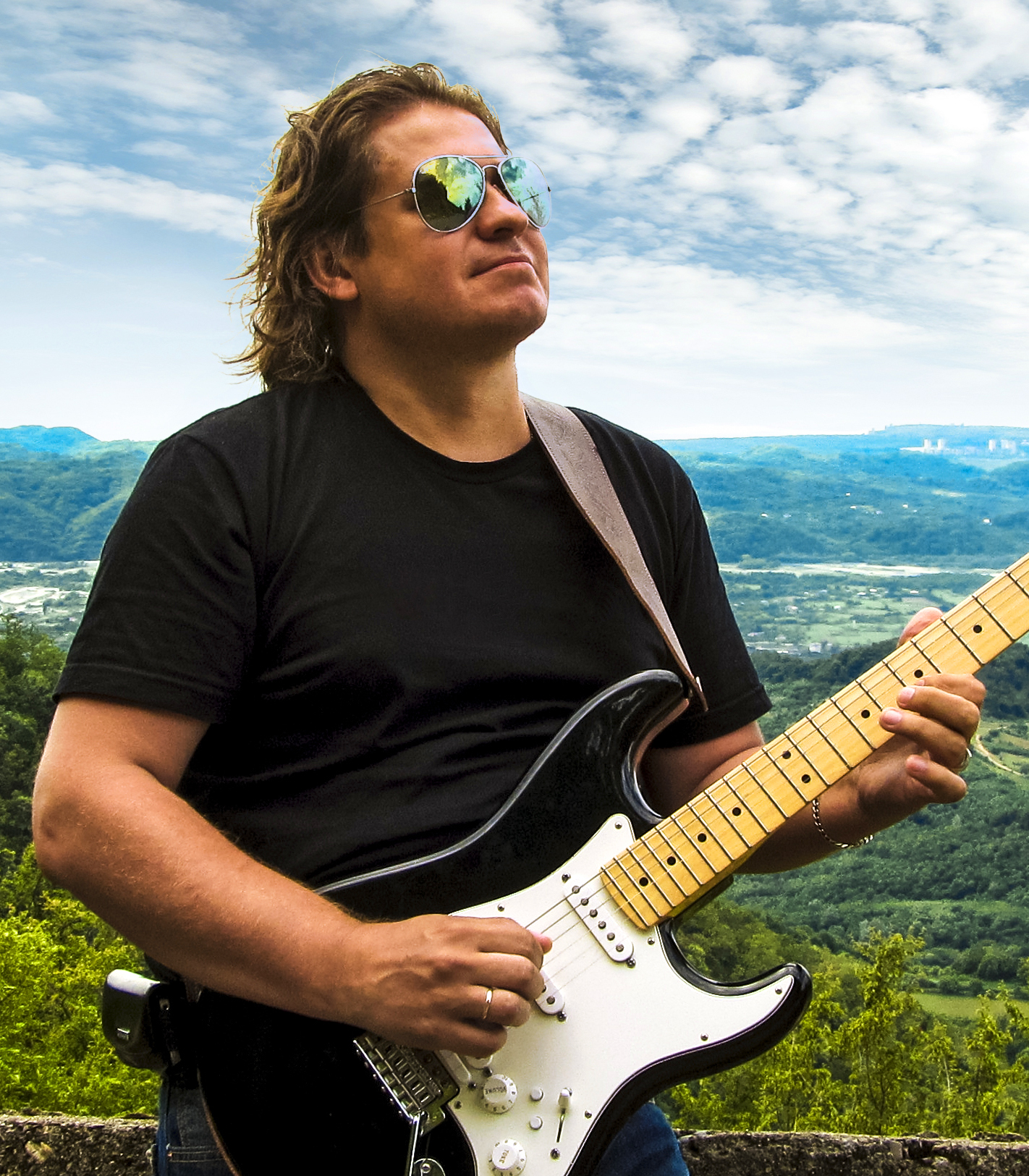
- Miroshnicheko in 2012

Background information
- Born: 4 June 1977 (age 49); Dniprodzerzhynsk, Ukrainian SSR, Soviet Union
- Genre: Jazz rock
- Occupations: Musician; guitarist; composer
- Instrument: Guitar
- Years active: 1994–present
- Labels: MJC, 7Jazz, Melodiya
- Website: romanmiroshnichenko.com

Roman Maksimovich Miroshnichenko (Russian: Роман Максимович Мирошниченко; born 4 June 1977) is a Ukraine born Russian guitarist and composer.

Josie Music Awards winner in the "Musician of the Year" category. Member of The Recording Academy/GRAMMYs. Guinness World Record official participant. First-place winner of the Annual USA Songwriting Competition. First-place winner of the International Songwriting Competition and the Annual International Acoustic Music Awards. Three-time winner of the World Entertainment Awards. Gold Medalist at the Global Music Awards. Overall winner of the Film Music Contest 2023. Director of international projects for the "World of Guitar" festival.

He has worked with musicians such as Steve Vai, Al Di Meola, Mike Stern, Marco Mendoza, Paul Wertico, Jennifer Batten, Heather Headley, Djivan Gasparyan, Dominique DiPiazza during his career. In 2008 - 2017 he toured regularly in a duo with fusion guitarist Larry Coryell.

== Awards ==
Year	Contest	Category	Nominated work	Result
2013	USA Songwriting Competition	Instrumental	"Desperation"	Won, 1st Prize
2020	International Acoustic Music Awards	Instrumental	"Ostrov"	Won, 1st Prize
2020	Hollywood Music in Media Awards	Best Instrumental	"Bodhrán's Magic"	Nominated
2021	Hollywood Music in Media Awards	Instrumental	"Flying Dragon"	Nominated
2021	Hollywood Music in Media Awards	Jazz	"Corona Funk"	Nominated
2022	Hollywood Music in Media Awards	Instrumental	"Pianino"	Nominated
2022	Global Music Awards	Instrumental Album	"My Best Songs"	Won, Gold Medal
2023	Hollywood Independent Music Awards	Best Mixing/Engineering	"Revolt"	Nominated
2023	Hollywood Independent Music Awards	Best Album	"My Best Songs"	Nominated
2023	USA Songwriting Competition	«Jazz»	«Africa»	Won, 1st Prize
2024	World Entertainment Awards	«Best Instrumental Album»	«My Best Songs»	Won
2024	International Songwriting Competition	«Instrumental»	«Bodhrán's Magic»	Won, 1st Prize
2024	Josie Music Awards	Musician Of the Year	Guitar	Nominated
2024	Global Music Awards	«Best World Music Album»	«Almanac»	Won
2025	Josie Music Awards	Musician Of the Year	Guitar	Nominated
2025	World Entertainment Awards	«Best Instrumental Album»	«Almanac»	Won
2025	World Entertainment Awards	«Best Jazz Solo Performance»	«Flying Dragon»	Won
2026	Josie Music Awards	Musician Of the Year	Guitar	Won

== Discography ==
=== As leader ===
- The Infinity (2005)
- Temptation (2009)
- Quasipsychedelic, (2011)
- Surreal (2013)
- Ascension (2017)
- The Sixth Sense (2020)
- Roman Miroshnichenko plays Stas Namin (2023)
- Almanac (2024)

=== Joint albums ===
- Together (2007)
- Perfect Strangers, World of Guitar Trio (2015)
- New Shapes, Roman Miroshnichenko and Henrik Andersen (2021)
- Plays Daniel Figueiredo, Roman Miroshnichenko and St.Petersburg Studio Orchestra (2021)

=== As special guest ===
- Poetic: Jazz Theater. Gariman Volnov. Feat.: Marco Mendoza, Larry Coryell, Joel Taylor, Mario Parmisano, Joey Heredia, Renato Neto (2012)
- One Eye On the Highway. Elizabeth MacInnis (2013)
- Bridges: A Musical Journey. Igor Ledermann (2014)
- Radio Nostalgia II. Mario Olivares (2016)
- Latin Lounge. Frank Colon (2019)

=== Singles ===
- Xekere, feat.: Roman Miroshnichenko, Clive Stevens, Greg Minnick, Michael Grossman, Frank Colón and Daniel Figueiredo. (2009).
- Penultimate, Roman Miroshnichenko & Larry Coryell (2012).
- We Are One, by Kashan Admani, feat. Simon Philips, Stu Hamm, Charlie Bisharat, Roman Miroshnichenko, Palash Sen, Matt Laurent (2020).
- IsoBoogie, Roman Miroshnichenko & Jennifer Batten (2020).
- Love Can, Barbara & Paul Wertico, feat. Laurie Akers, Roman Miroshnichenko (2020).
- El Encuentro, René Tornero G., feat. Roman Miroshnichenko (2021)
- Fusion Holidays, by Bunny Brunel, featuring Roman Miroshnichenko with Virgil Donati, Mahesh Balasooriya and Kaylene Peoples. (2022).
- Snowlight, feat.: Roman Miroshnichenko, Anastasia Zakharova, Polina Chernova (2024).

=== As sideman ===
- Stillness in Motion - The Space Between The Notes. Steve Vai, DVD (SME, 2015)

=== Other ===
- All Your Life. Al Di Meola. CD cover photographer credits. (Veliene, 2013)

== Filmography ==
- 2004 – «Kamenskaya III». TV–series. Guitar tracks recording
- 2005 – «Tourists». TV–series. Guitar tracks recording
- 2007 – «Russian Game». Film. Guitar tracks recording
- 2007 – «Live in Jazz Town», DVD. RMProject's live show
- 2008 – «Two sisters». TV-series. As episode's actor
- 2008 – «Neproshchennye». Directed by Klim Shipenko. Soundtrack's co–author, guitar tracks recording
- 2010 – «Orange Juice». Film. As episode's actor.
- 2010 – «Ribeirao do tempo». Brazilian soap opera. Guitar tracks recording
- 2010 – «Tides to and From». Animated short film by Ivan Maksimov. Guitar tracks recording. The official participant of the Generation Kplus Programme at the 61st Berlinale Film Festival Competition, San Gio Verona Video Festival 2011 winner ("Best animatied film"), Eksjö Animation Festival 2011 winner, XVIII International Festival Competition of animation films Krok special prize winner, 2011.
- 2011 – «Canto de Pilon». Music video
- 2013 – «Music teacher dreams». Feat. Dominic Miller, Tony Levin, Juan Manuel Canizares, Daniel Piazzolla, Dominique Di Piazza, Roman Miroshnichenko, Adrian Belew.
- 2018 – «Alien's Electrik Dream». Music video
- 2020 – «We Are One». Music video
- 2021 – «Russian Mountains». Music video
- 2021 – «Trick». Animated short film. As composer.
