= We Are One (global collaboration song) =

"We Are One/Aae Khuda"

Song by 40 international artists
- Language: Urdu, English
- Released: 28 May 2020
- Genre: World music
- Composer: Kashan Admani
- Lyricists: Sabir Zafar, Babar Sheikh

"We Are One" (Urdu: Aae Khuda) is an international collaboration song produced by Kashan Admani in Dream Station Productions.

== Lineup ==
"We Are One" features the contributions of 40 musicians from seven countries.

- Charlie Bisharat – violin
- Simon Phillips – drums
- Stuart Hamm – bass
- Roman Miroshnichenko – acoustic guitar
- Gumbi Ortiz – congas, guiro
- Taylor Simpson – percussions
- Amir Azhar – mandolin
- Omran Shafique – electric guitar
- Kashan Admani – electric guitar
- Ammar Khaled Anam – electric guitar
- Imran Akhoond – acoustic guitar
- Alex Shahbaz – piano

The collaborating singers include: Palash Sen, Lili Caseley, Luiza Prochet, Najam Sheraz, Matt Laurent, Faakhir Mehmood, Bilal Ali, Natasha Baig, Farhad Humayun, Natasha Khan, Maha Ali Kazmi, Nida Hussain, Khaled Anam, Dino Ali, Ali Khan, Salwa Najam, Raafay Israr, Asad Rasheed, Aashir Wajahat, Farooq Ahmed, Nazia Zuberi Hassan, Meraal Hassan, Nauman Vohra, Fahad Ahmad, Ahsan Bari, Eahab Akhtar, and Faisal Malik.

External media

Audio
- Official Audio on SoundCloud
- Official Audio on Spotify
- Official Audio on Amazon Music

Video
- Music video on YouTube
- Music video on Facebook

== Background ==
Kashan Admani, a Pakistani producer, composer, and guitarist, initiated the project of "a song that would be a united prayer" during the COVID-19 pandemic. The song was created to inspire hope to the global population affected by COVID-19. Admani said in an interview with Arab News: "The idea was to talk about global unity in fighting the pandemic and praying to God for help. That's the reason why it's called 'We Are One', 'Aae Khuda'".

Each artist recorded their audio and video parts in home studios or recording facilities and sent them to Admani, who mixed the final track in his studio, Dream Station Productions. The Urdu poetry of Aae Khuda was written by Sabir Zafar, while the English poetry was written by Babar Sheikh.
