= Dhaani =

Studio album by Strings
- Released: September 1, 2003
- Recorded: 2002–2003 at Hill Music Studio Karachi, Pakistan
- Genres: Pop; Rock
- Length: 39:09
- Labels: Sadaf Records, Sony BMG
- Producer: Strings

Strings chronology
| Duur (2000) | Dhaani (2003) | Koi Aanay Wala Hai (2008) |

Singles from Dhaani
- 1. "Dhaani" Released: June 2004; 2. "Najane Kyun" Released: July 2004; 3. "Kahani Mohabat Ki" Released: May 2005; 4. "Chaaye Chaaye"; 5. "Bolo Bolo"; 6. "Mera Bichara Yaar"; 7. "Pal"; 8. "Soniyae"; 9. "Hai Koi Hum Jaisa"

Professional ratings
Review scores
| Source | Rating |
|---|---|
| Allmusic | 4.5/5 stars |

Dhaani (Urdu: دھانی, literal English translation: "light green") was the fourth album by the Pakistani pop band Strings, released in 2003. Singles from the album were "Mera Bichara Yaar", "Soniyae", "Chaaye Chaaye", "Pal", "Bolo Bolo", "Dhaani", "Najane Kyun", "Hai Koi Hum Jaisa" and "Kahani Mohabbat Ki".

Dhaani by Strings was Pakistan's 1st album with 8 videos and garnered 5 awards. Qirat Hamed covered their song Mera Bichra Yaar.

== Concept ==
Dhaani means light green. It has come from a word called 'Dhaan' that is the outer covering of a raw grain of rice (kacha chawal ka daana). The green color of that grain is called dhaani.

Dhaani, the first song of the album is a blend of Faisal's groovy voice and Bilal Maqsood's guitars. Next in line is "Najane Kyun". It's a soft number, which gives the signature sound of Strings followed by "Kahani Mohabat ki" and "Mera Bichara Yaar". Sohniye", a unique and extremely jumpy number, is a treat to listen to. "Bolo Bolo" features Hariharan and 'Pal' featuring Sagarika has excellent background music and lyrics. "Chaaye Chaaye" is the liveliest.

According to Bilal, Dhaani is directly related to nature if you closely go through its lyrics. The lyrics have many references to nature such as in the title track one constantly hears words like badal (clouds), nadiya (rivers) and more. Also when the duo were composing the tunes in Murree for about a month they were more exposed to the exotic beauty of the Northern areas and that gave them the idea of having green patches and open skies on the album cover.

== Track listing ==
All songs are written by Anwar Maqsood, those which are not are mentioned below. All songs are composed by Bilal Maqsood.

Dhaani
| No. | Title | Writer(s) | Length |
|---|---|---|---|
| 1. | "Dhaani" | Zehra Nigah | 4:29 |
| 2. | "Najane Kyun" | | 5:10 |
| 3. | "Kahani Mohabat Ki" | | 5:03 |
| 4. | "Soniyae" | | 4:02 |
| 5. | "Bolo Bolo (feat. Hariharan)" | | 6:02 |
| 6. | "Chaaye Chaaye" | | 4:24 |
| 7. | "Mera Bichraa Yaar" | | 4:53 |
| 8. | "Pal (feat. Sagarika)" | | 5:32 |
| 9. | "Mitti" | | 5:04 |
| 10. | "Hai Koi Hum Jaisa (version 1)" | | 4:32 |
| 11. | "Hai Koi Hum Jaisa" | | 4:50 |

== Personnel ==
All information is taken from the CD.

Strings

- Faisal Kapadia: lead vocals
- Bilal Maqsood: vocals, lead guitar

Additional musicians

- Vocals: Hariharan (Bolo Bolo) & Sagarika daCosta (Pal)
- Guitars: Shuja Haider & Shallum Asher Xavier
- Violin: Suresh Lalwani
- Flute: Sajid & Baqir

Production

- Produced by Strings
- Drums & Keyboards sequenced by Shuja Haider & Faizi
- Mixing by Shahzad Hasan
- Recorded at Hill Music Studio by Ishaq Nazeer, High End Studios by Emad & Dixon and Post Station (Mumbai, India) by Vijay Benegal
- Album concept and design by Aamir Shah
- 3D art by Adeel Butt
