= Coke Studio Pakistan season 7 =

Seventh television season of Coke Studio

Coke Studio Pakistan
- Season 7
- season 7 logo
- Starring: Featured Artists
- No. of episodes: 7

Release
- Original release: September 21 – November 22, 2014

Season chronology
- ← Previous; Season 6 Next → Season 8

The seventh season of the Pakistani music television series Coke Studio Pakistan premiered on 21 September 2014 and aired its final episode on 22 November 2014. Previously, it was scheduled to premiere on 7 September 2014, but was delayed due to an ongoing political crisis which caught the media attention everywhere. Season premiered under the tagline of Sound of the Nation.

The season was produced by Strings, as the previous producer, Rohail Hyatt, had quit on 22 January 2014. while Coca-Cola returns as an executive producer. The band's members, Bilal Maqsood and Faisal Kapadia, produced the show for the first time. While they briefly appeared as featured artists in season one and season two, the duo took three months to complete the production of the series.

The season featured twenty-three artists, twenty-two musicians and twenty-eight songs. The season featured a new house band which included musicians, backing vocalists and guest musicians.

== Season changes ==
Season 7 witnessed many changes, ranging from the production team to studio sets, from music closure to musicians and from last season's atypical music genres to the return of original music genres of show. After the quitting of Coke Studio Pakistan founder Rohail Hyatt as a producer due to the personal reasons, Strings' Bilal Maqsood and Faisal Kapadia took the charge of season, bringing back the rock, folk, pop and sufi genres of Coke Studio, with the season's Pakistani featured artists. Many artists reprised their appearances from the previous seasons. This season paid homage to the Sound of the Nation.

In a series of firsts, Season 7 delved into new unexplored genres while also touching upon the role that film music has had in defining the musical history by visiting quintessentially Pakistani film music within Coke Studio stage. With the change in appearance, Coke Studio logo's color were reverted as Coke was painted with White and Studio was Black, with the 'i' in Studio referring to Coke bottle, painted with white.

With many new additions, Season 7 featured locally and globally renowned Pakistani artists. They also had a mix of popular Pakistani songs and performances that incorporated the use of traditional Pakistani instruments.

== Artists ==
=== Featured Artists ===
Following is the list of twenty-four Featured Artist Line-up, that will perform as individuals, duo's and with chorus:

- Abbas Ali Khan
- Abida Parveen
- Abrar-ul-Haq
- Akhtar Chanal Zahri
- Asrar
- Fariha Pervez
- Humaira Channa
- Javed Bashir
- Jawad Ahmed
- Jimmy Khan
- Komal Rizvi
- Meesha Shafi
- Momin Durrani
- Naseer & Shahab
- Niazi Brothers
- Rachel Viccaji
- Rahat Fateh Ali Khan
- Rahma Ali
- Sajjad Ali
- Usman Riaz
- Ustad Rais Khan
- Ustad Tafu
- Zoe Viccaji
- Zohaib Hassan

=== Musicians ===
With the departure of Hyatt, the house band was almost completely revamped with new artists. Momin Durrani and Sara Haider were the first artists who make their debut as featured artists and also served as backing singers while Rachel Viccaji returned to season 7 with her third appearance as a backing singer.

House Band
- Drums: Aahad Nayani
- Tabla & Dholak: Babar Ali Khanna
- Guitars: Imran Akhoond
- Piano, Synth & Keyboard: Jaffer Ali Zaidi
- Bass: Khalid Khan
- Percussion: Sikandar Mufti

Guest Musicians
- Clarinet: Jaffer Hussain
- Flute: Sajid Ali
- Guitar: Aamir Zaki, Adeel Ali, Omran Shafique & Shallum Xavier
- Jazz Guitar: Faraz Anwar
- Harmonium & Melodica: Arsalan Ali
- Keyboard: Mubashir Admani
- Rubab: Tanveer Tafu
- Ukulele: Hamza Jafri

String Section
- Ghulam Abbas
- Javed Iqbal
- Kaleem Khan
- Saleem Khan
- Umar Daraz

Backing Vocals
- Momin Durrani
- Rachel Viccaji
- Sara Haider

== Production ==
Coke Studio returned, after the sudden and abrupt ending of season six, because of copyright issues and bid the farewell to longtime producer Rohail Hyatt. After Hyattt's departure, Coca-Cola approached Strings band duo, Bilal Maqsood and Faisal Kapadia, who had appeared as featured artists in the first two seasons. Shooting of Season 7 spanned from May to July 2014, while the editing, development and progressive stages were completed in July. In an interview with Dawn, Bilal said:

"We're going to stay true to the CS feel and continue to merge elements of folk with modern music. There are so many untapped musical treasures in Pakistan and we're looking forward to exploring into them. At the same time, we're hoping to bring back the oomph that has been missing from the show during the past few years. Coke Studio was spectacular up till Season 3 but after that, it lost out on its element of surprise. We plan to bring it back."

— Bilal Maqsood – Dawn News.

While talking to Instep Magazine, answering to a question, Faisal said:

"We had no idea how Rohail worked. Our interaction with the show, in the first two seasons, was restricted to our performances. During the first season, we weren't comfortable with the arrangement and requested Rohail if we would play with our own band and it was just such a generous reaction on Rohail's part to let us play with our band. Because now that we’ve worked with this CS7 house band for months, if someone comes in and wants to bring in their own band, we may not agree. Rohail said yes, but apart from that we didn't know what else he did or how he ran the show. We made our own system…"

— Bilal Maqsood, Instep Magazine, 17 August 2014.

Coca-Cola GM Rizwan Khan said that their aim was to:

"reinvent the way music can capture the spirit of Pakistan. Coke Studio season seven will discover the talent and variance that this nation has to offer. Coke Studio has enabled and empowered Pakistani musicians to express their talents and skills. Many new stars have emerged and the initiative has provided a unique platform for the fusion and learning of music".

== Episodes ==
| No. overall | Song Title | Artist(s) | Language(s) | Original release date |
|---|---|---|---|---|
Episode 1
| 30 | "Sab Aakho Ali Ali" | Asrar | Punjabi | September 20, 2014 |
| 30 | "Tum Naraz Ho" | Sajjad Ali | Urdu | September 20, 2014 |
| 30 | "Lai Beqadaraan Naal Yaari" | Niazi Brothers | Punjabi | September 20, 2014 |
| 30 | "Mein Sufi Hoon" | Abida Parveen & Ustad Raees Khan | Braj, Punjabi & Urdu | September 20, 2014 |
Episode 2
| 31 | "Washmallay" | Akhtar Chanal Zahri, Komal Rizvi & Momin Durrani | Balochi & Brahui | September 27, 2014 |
| 31 | "Phool Banro" | Abbas Ali Khan & Humira Channa | Marwari | September 27, 2014 |
| 31 | "Chehra" | Zohaib Hassan | Urdu | September 27, 2014 |
| 31 | "Charkha" | Javed Bashir | Punjabi | September 27, 2014 |
Episode 3
| 32 | "Jhoolay Laal" | Fariha Pervez & Sajjad Ali | Punjabi | October 4, 2014 |
| 32 | "Sunn Ve Balori" | Meesha Shafi | Punjabi | October 4, 2014 |
| 32 | "Nadiya" | Jimmy Khan & Rahma Ali | Urdu | October 4, 2014 |
| 32 | "Dost" | Abida Parveen | N/A | October 4, 2014 |
Episode 4
| 33 | "Shakar Wandaan Re" | Asrar | Punjabi | October 11, 2014 |
| 33 | "Ambwa Talay" | Humaira Channa & Javed Bashir | Braj | October 11, 2014 |
| 33 | "Dheeray Dheeray" | Zohaib Hassan | Urdu | October 11, 2014 |
| 33 | "Bone Shaker" | Usman Riaz | Instrumental | October 11, 2014 |
Episode 5
| 34 | "Mujhay Baar Baar" | Abbas Ali Khan | Urdu | October 18, 2014 |
| 34 | "Pehla Pyar" | Jimmy Khan | Urdu | October 18, 2014 |
| 34 | "Mitti Da Pehlwan" | Jawad Ahmad | Punjabi | October 18, 2014 |
| 34 | "Kheryaan De Naal" | Niazi Brothers | Punjabi | October 18, 2014 |
Episode 6
| 35 | "Yaad" | Javed Bashir | Siraiki | November 15, 2014 |
| 35 | "Chaap Tilak" | Abida Parveen & Rahat Fateh Ali Khan | Braj | November 15, 2014 |
| 35 | "Jaana" | Zohaib Hassan & Zoe Viccaji | Urdu | November 15, 2014 |
| 35 | "Descent to the Ocean Floor" | Usman Riaz | Instrumental | November 15, 2014 |
Episode 7
| 36 | "Suth Gaana" | Sajjad Ali | Punjabi | November 22, 2014 |
| 36 | "Pani Da Bulbula" | Abrar-ul-Haq | Punjabi | November 22, 2014 |
| 36 | "Za Sta Pashan Na Yam" | Naseer And Shahab | Pashto | November 22, 2014 |
| 36 | "Hans Dhuni" | Ustad Raees Khan | Instrumental | November 22, 2014 |

== Reception and review ==
Before the episode hitting the screens, the promos went enormously hits, as they depict the previous looks of sets, previous artists line up and studios previous music genres. Only the house band personalities were missed by audience. From the previous seasons, drummer Gumby was heavily demanded and appreciated for his work. Despite the abrupt ending of season six, people still admired Rohail and were willing to see him back.

Bilal Masood, the producer of series said:

"Taking the reins of Pakistan's biggest music platform is a feeling that can't be expressed in words. This has been a magical ride for us, 23 artists, 22 musicians and 28 songs. As producers we couldn't have asked for more. It's all about celebrating Pakistani music and our artists".

Moreover, artists from the studio also shared their journey with Strings and their ideas of working with other producers. Keyboard player Jaffer Zaidi said

"I think Rohail Bhai and Strings have different strengths and weaknesses as producers, therefore the experience is entirely different. The most prominent difference this year has been the creative freedom, involvement, and dialogue being offered to all the musicians that were part of the project. God willing, season 7 has much to offer."

Bass player, Khalid Khan of Coke Studio said:

"The best thing about this season is the fact that no one is over playing a certain instrument and everything is being used to enhance the ensemble. We have paid special attention to the groove and rest I leave it up to the listeners to decide."

== See also ==
- Pakistan Music Stars
- Music of Pakistan
