= Koi Aanay Wala Hai =

Koi Aanay Wala Haii

Studio album by Strings
- Released: May 16, 2008
- Recorded: 2007–2008 at Hill Music Studio Karachi, Pakistan
- Genres: Pop; Rock
- Length: 52:14
- Labels: Fire Records, Sony BMG
- Producers: Strings, John Abraham Entertainment

Strings chronology
Dhaani (2003)	Koi Aanay Wala Haii (2008)	Thirty (2019)

Singles from Koi Aanay Wala Hai
- 1. "Zinda" Released: September 17, 2006; 2. "Aakhri Alvida" Released: May 8, 2007; 3. "Hum Hee Hum" Released: November 1, 2007; 4. "Koi Aanay Wala Hai" Released: May 19, 2008; 5. "Humsafar" Released: June 24, 2008; 6. "Jago" Released: October 9, 2008; 7. "Titliyan" Released: November 6, 2009

Professional ratings
Review scores
Source	Rating
Allmusic	4/5 stars

Koi Aanay Wala Hai (Urdu: کوئی آنے والا ہے, literal English translation: "someone is coming") is the fifth studio album by the Pakistani pop band Strings, released on 16 May 2008.

== Track listing ==
All songs are written by Anwar Maqsood. All songs are composed by Bilal Maqsood.

Koi Aanay Wala Hai
No.	Title	Length
1.	"Koi Aanay Wala Hai"	4:28
2.	"Aik Do Theen"	4:25
3.	"Humsafar"	4:40
4.	"Jago"	3:49
5.	"Dooba Dooba"	5:08
6.	"Keh Dia"	4:29
7.	"Jab Se Tumko"	3:32
8.	"Sonay Du"	4:55
9.	"Jab Bhi Mein"	4:54
10.	"Titliyan"	5:00

Pakistani Edition
No.	Title	Length
11.	"Zinda"	5:21
12.	"Aakhri Alvida"	4:39

== Personnel ==
All information is taken from the CD.

Strings

- Faisal Kapadia: lead vocals
- Bilal Maqsood: vocals, lead guitar
- Shafal Babdoiat: Clarient
- Kemana Habita: Keywords
- Atulama Madiarn Drums

Additional musicians

- Drums and Percussion: John "Gumby" Louis Pinto
- Flute: Sajid
- Bass: Shakir
- Guitars: Shuja Haider & Imran Akhoond
- Keyboards: Shuja Haider

Production

- Produced by Strings and John Abraham Entertainment
- Arranged by Shuja Haider
- Drums sequenced by Shuja Haider
- Recording engineered by Faisal Rafi
- Studio assistance at Silent Studio by Nadeem Durrani
- Mixing engineered by Shantanu Hudlikar
- Mixing assistance by Abhishek & Ishaq Nazeer
- Mixed at Yashraj Studios Mumbai, India
- Vocal recording at Silent Studio, Karachi
- Mastered at Sterling Sound, New York City, by Chris Athens
- Recorded & mixed by Ishaq Nazeer at Hill Music Studios, Karachi, Pakistan
- Album art by Aamir Shah
- Photography by Usman & Tejal

== Awards ==
- Strings won the Best Album Award for "Koi Aanay Wala Hai" at MTV Awards 2009.
