= Strings (band) =

Pakistani pop/rock band

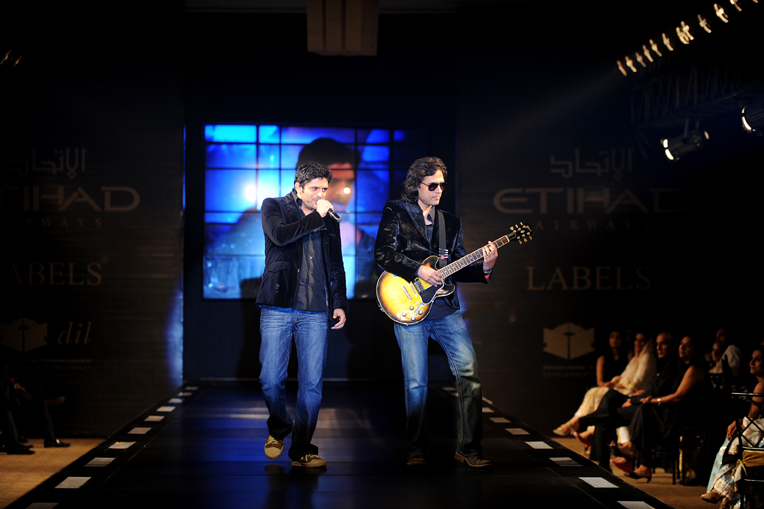
- Strings performing at the Etihad Runway in June 2010. From left to right are; Faisal Kapadia and Bilal Maqsood.

Background information
- Origin: Karachi, Sindh, Pakistan
- Genres: Pop rock, Hard rock, Progressive rock
- Years active: 1988–1992; 1999–2021
- Labels: EMI, Fire Records, Sony BMG
- Members: Faisal Kapadia; Bilal Maqsood; Bradley D'souza; Haider Ali; Aahad Nayani
- Past members: Rafiq Wazir Ali; Kareem Bashir Bhoy; Shakir Khan
- Website: Stringsonline.net

Strings (Urdu: اسٹرنگز) was a Pakistani pop/rock band composed of two members, plus four live band members from Karachi, Pakistan. The band was initially formed by four college students—Bilal Maqsood (vocals and guitars), Faisal Kapadia (vocals), Rafiq Wazir Ali (synthesizer) and Kareem Bashir Bhoy (bass guitar)—in 1988. In 1992 the quartet disbanded, only to make a comeback with Maqsood and Kapadia in 2000. While the initial band rode the new wave of Pakistani pop music, the later lineup ushered a revival in the Pakistani music industry.

In 1990 the band signed with EMI Records and released their debut album, Strings. Their initial experiments with synthesized sounds and rhythms were not immediately recognised, although Strings sold 20,000 copies during its first week after release. Two years later the band released their second album, 2, which included the critically acclaimed single "Sar Kiye Yeh Pahar". The song was first aired on MTV Asia, and led the band to widespread fame. After the release of 2, the quartet disbanded to focus on their studies and careers. In 2000, Maqsood and Kapadia released Duur, which revived the band's popularity, and followed it with Dhaani in 2003. This album included the single "Najane Kyun", which was part of the soundtrack for the Hollywood film Spider-Man 2. Following Junoon and Nusrat Fateh Ali Khan, Strings went to India (where they found remixes of one of their early songs playing in clubs). In 2008 Strings released their fifth album, Koi Aanay Wala Hai, with the singles "Yeh Hai Meri Kahani" and "Aakhri Alvida" (included on the soundtracks for Bollywood's Zinda and Shootout at Lokhandwala). The album was co-produced by Bollywood actor John Abraham, and was successful in Pakistan and India.

Strings are recognized for their stringed rhythms and melodious, poetic songs written by Anwar Maqsood, Bilal's father. He has been writing lyrics for the band since its re-formation, with Kapadia the lead vocalist. Bilal Maqsood composes, plays guitar and occasionally sings. Strings' live performances are augmented by Adeel Ali on lead guitar, Shakir Khan on bass guitar, Haider Ali on keyboards and Aahad Nayani on drums. The band have sold over 25 million albums worldwide. In April 2013 Strings joined Meesha Shafi, Ali Azmat, Shahzad Hasan and Alamgir as judges on the vocal-talent show Cornetto Music Icons, aired on ARY Digital.

Strings produced and directed music reality series, Coke Studio Pakistan from 2013 to 2017.

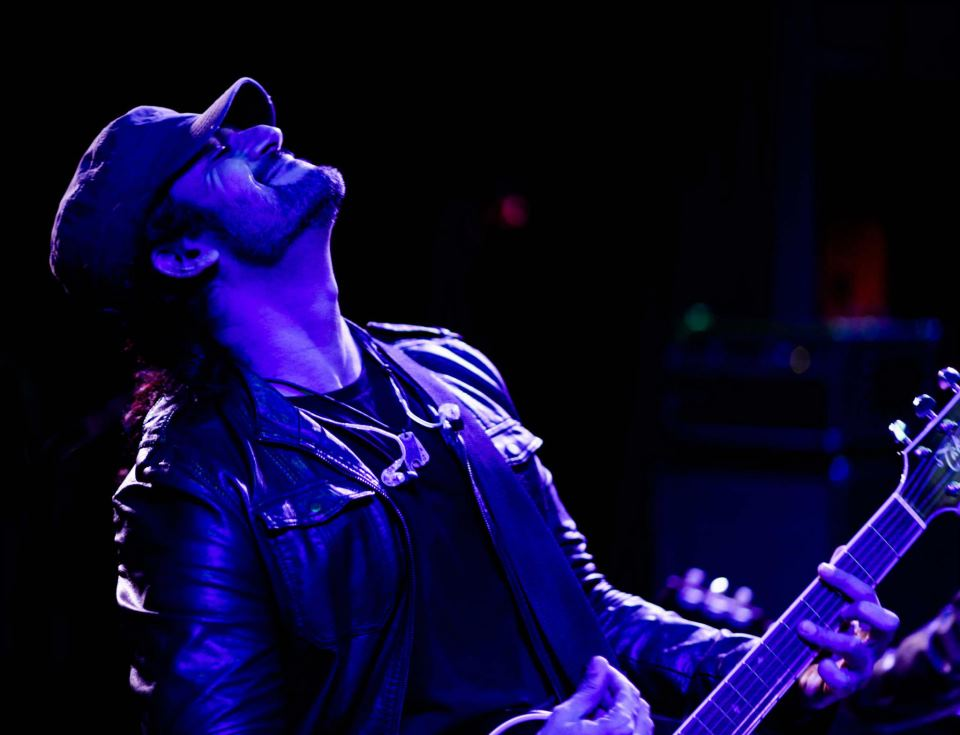
Faisal Kapadia

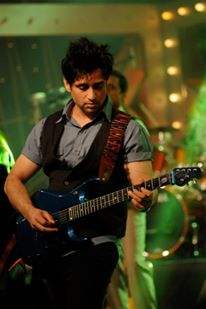
Adeel Ali, Strings Lead Guitarist

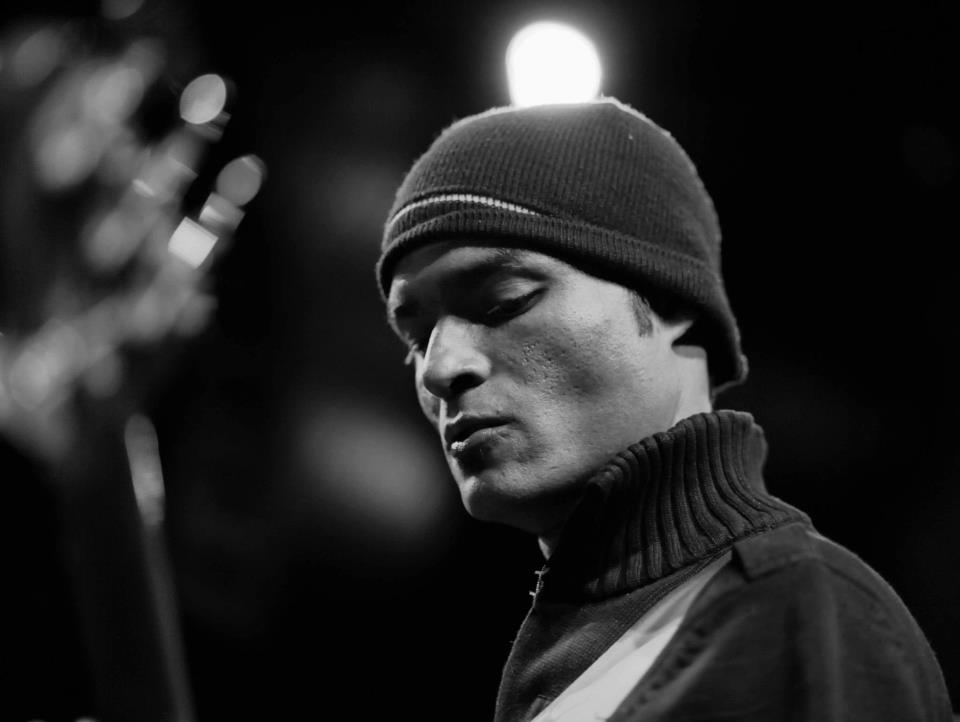
Shakir Khan, Strings Bass Guitarist

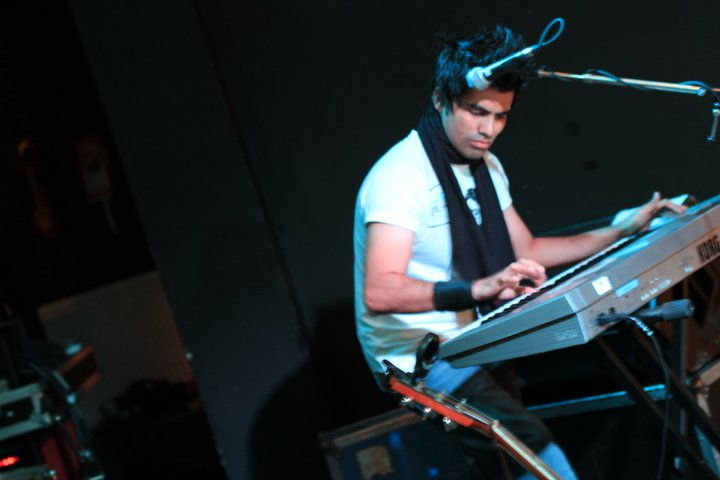
Haider Ali, Strings Keyboardist

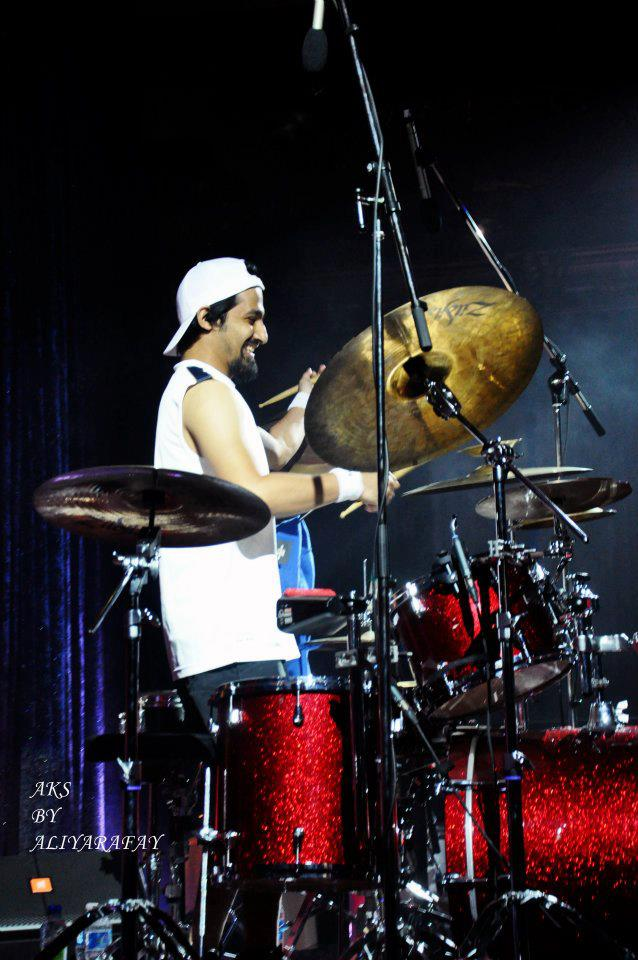
Aahad Nayani, Strings Drummer

== History ==
=== Quartet (1988–1992) ===
Pop music became more popular in Pakistan during the late 1980s, with new artists emerging in the scene. Shalimar Television Network (STN), one of two channels in the country—the other was the Pakistan Television Corporation (PTV)—launched a show entitled Music Channel Charts to showcase new talent. In Karachi, however, fans of singers such as Nazia and Zoheb, Alamgir and Ali Shehki were eager to hear the new wave of Pakistani pop music.

In 1988, at the Government College of Commerce & Economics in Karachi, four classmates (Bilal Maqsood, Faisal Kapadia, Rafiq Wazir Ali and Kareem Bashir Bhoy) formed a band. They called themselves Strings after the host of their college farewell party asked for their name while they were being announced on stage. The band played songs with lyrics influenced by Maqsood's father, Anwar Maqsood. In 1990, with help from Mansoor Bukhari (head of the EMI Group in Pakistan), the band released Strings on EMI.

=== Breakup (1992) ===
In 1992 the band and the Shalimar Recording Company released a follow-up album, 2. Maqsood, realising that Strings needed more exposure, directed a video for "Sar Kiye Yeh Pahar". It was played on STN during their hour-long show; with little competition Maqsood's directorial début was a success, making the song a nationwide hit. The band had a string of hits, touring and enjoying the lifestyle of post-1980s pop stars. However, their fame was short-lived and the quartet broke up. Soon afterwards, though, their "Sar Kiye Yeh Pahar" video aired on MTV Asia and sparked international fame.

After Strings disbanded, Maqsood attended art school and later became a creative director at an advertising agency. Kapadia went to Houston, Texas to continue his business studies; Ali and Bhoy continued their education.

=== Comeback (1999–2002) ===
Strings' third album, Duur was a hit in India (where their reputation preceded them).

In the nearly eight years since Strings were famous, their reputation had faded. Bilal Maqsood continued his work as creative director at an advertising firm, involving Kapadia in the creative process as well; the latter worked in the marketing department of a production unit in the same company. Both had married and were fathers. Although they had given up music, they still loved it.

The new millennium saw another shakeup in the Pakistani music industry and they were interested in participating. Since Ali and Bhoy were unavailable, Maqsood and Kapadia decided to re-form Strings by themselves; this meant giving up their day jobs.

They recorded "Duur", asking their friend Jamshed (Jami) Mehmood to direct a video. However, Pakistan banned Indian television channels on its cable network. Non-government television networks filled the void, and new music channels were introduced in the country. The video for "Duur" was distributed to all stations, and its success marked the band's comeback.

Although Strings were successful in Pakistan, they were unaware that a remixed version of "Sar Kiye Yeh Pahaar" was being played in Indian clubs and had established their reputation. When their new video was played on Indian music channels, "Duur" became a hit across the border. In January 2002 they reissued Duur on the Magnasound label, which had launched pop stars Baba Sehgal and Remo Fernandes.

=== Revival (2003–2006) ===
The realization that Pakistani pop music had a cult following in India encouraged its artists, and local Pakistani music channels hosted collaborations with their Indian counterparts. Strings played with bands such as the New Delhi-based Euphoria. Samsung invited Strings to collaborate with Euphoria; they recorded "Jheet Lo Dil", Strings' cross-border breakthrough. The hit became the official song for the India national cricket team's tour of Pakistan. After the success of their third album and "Jheet Lo Dil", Strings toured India with Channel V. The band were warmly received by Indian audiences, and lined up singers Hariharan and Sagarika for their fourth album.

Strings appeared on Channel V's television show Jammin, performing "Pal" from their upcoming fourth album with Sagarika. The song was written and recorded in audio and video over a three-day period. The band then recorded the single "Bolo Bolo", later re-recording the track with Hariharan. Both collaborations were eagerly awaited and critically acclaimed. Strings played an unplugged set at the Hard Rock Cafe in Dubai, which added to their fame beyond the subcontinent. The band were approached by Columbia Records, who released their fourth album (Dhaani) on 1 September 2003.

In June 2004 Strings released the music video of the title track, "Dhaani", directed by Jamshed Mehmood. The band were then approached by Columbia TriStar Films of India, a sister company of their record label, to include their next single ("Najane Kyun") on the soundtrack of the Hindi version of the Hollywood film, Spider-Man 2.

In May 2005 Strings released the music video of "Kahani Mohabat Ki", directed by Umar Anwar. The single was a success, receiving positive reviews from critics. With their subcontinental success, the band won the Favorite Artist India award at the MTV Asia Awards 2005. Strings were approached by director Sanjay Gupta, who was shooting Zinda (a remake of the South Korean film Oldboy), for a song for its soundtrack. Bilal Maqsood composed "Zinda Hoon" (with lyrics by his father, Anwar) for the film. The duo acted with (and befriended) two Bollywood A-list actors, John Abraham and Sanjay Dutt, with whom they later worked. In July 2006, Strings were nominated for Most Wanted Band and won the Motorola Music Icon award at the 2006 The Musik Awards. "Zinda Hoon" was nominated for the Most Wanted Song and Best Pop Song awards. On 28 September 2006 the band released "Beirut", an anti-war video.

=== Success (2007–2010) ===
On 8 May 2007 Strings released "Aakhri Alvida" on the soundtrack of Shootout at Lokhandwala, a Bollywood film directed by Apoorva Lakhia. On 1 November, they released the single "Hum Hee Hum" and its music video from their fifth album. Also in late 2007, Strings signed an agreement with the Gibson Guitar Corporation; they and the Pakistani rock band Jal were the first South Asian bands to have a working relationship with the guitar manufacturer. It was reported that as part of the agreement, Strings would use Gibson guitars exclusively for concerts, recordings and music videos. In return, Gibson would provide concert venues and required equipment.

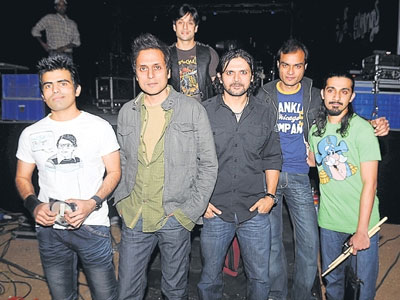
Left to right: Haider Ali, Bilal Maqsood, Adeel Ali, Faisal Kapadia, Shakir Khan, Aahad Nayani

On 16 May 2008 Strings released their fifth album, Koi Aanay Wala Hai, on Fire Records in Pakistan and Sony BMG internationally. The album, co-produced by Bollywood actor John Abraham, topped the charts in Pakistan and India and included songs from the soundtracks of the Bollywood films Shootout at Lokhandwala and Zinda. On 19 May the band released the album's title track, "Koi Aanay Wala Hai", featured John Abraham. On 24 June Strings released a music video for "Humsafar", directed by Jami Mehmood and filmed in Moscow. This was followed by a performance on the debut season of the musical television programme Coke Studio, which also showcased Pakistani artists and musicians Ali Azmat, Mauj, Rahat Fateh Ali Khan and Ali Zafar. During the second episode of Coke Studio, aired on 29 June, Strings performed their singles "Sar Kiye Yeh Pahar", "Anjane", "Zinda Hoon" and a duet on "Duur" with Ustaad Hussain Bakhsh Gullo. In August 2011, they again appeared on the show, performing "Dhaani" with Gullo. On 9 October Strings released another single, "Jago", with an accompanying music video. The band's success in Coke Studio's first season led them to an appearance on the show's second-season finale, airing on Pakistan's Independence Day (14 August 2009), in which they performed "Titliyan". In November Strings released the "Titliyan" music video, which did well on local music charts.

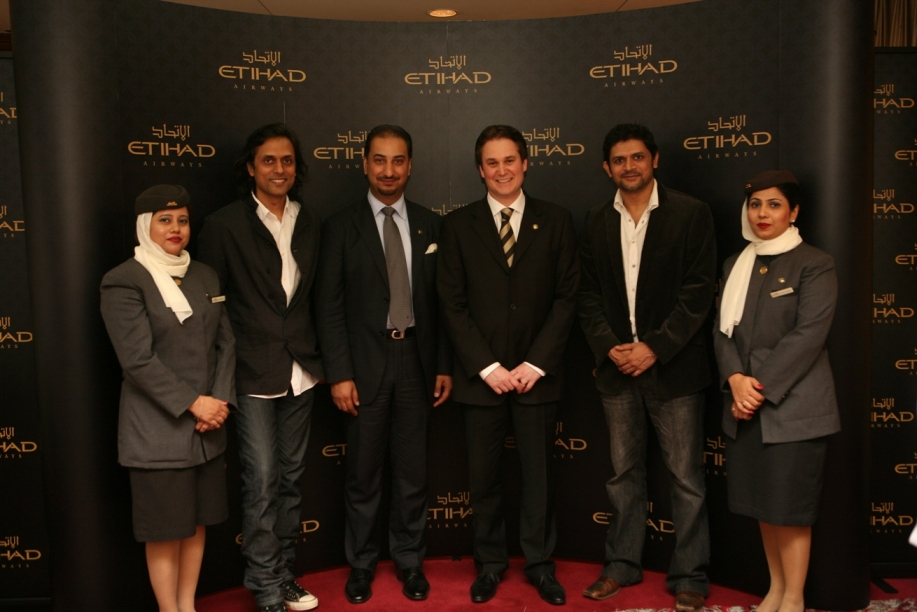
Strings signed a one-year partnership with Etihad Airways (based in Abu Dhabi, United Arab Emirates) as brand ambassadors in 2010.

In June 2010 Strings signed a one-year partnership with Abu Dhabi-based Etihad Airways as its brand ambassadors, promoting Pakistan in the global market with the band's music. Peter Baumgartner, chief commercial officer for Etihad Airways, said he was "looking forward to witnessing how the Etihad brand name reached across the world through the music of Strings." Vocalist Faisal Kapadia said, "It is not only about free air tickets. We needed something like this to promote the true image of Pakistan. We want to do concerts internationally, but it is very expensive. This deal will help to overcome that".

On 5 June, Strings and Arshad Mehmood judged the National Song Competition for national awareness initiative Azme Alishan. The primary aim of the movement is to revive the spirit of nationhood and community in Pakistan, highlighting the country's young musical talent. The competition was televised worldwide throughout the summer, with the winner announced on 14 August. Other guest judges were former Vital Signs member Shahzad Hassan, singer Najam Sheraz and Khalid Khan from the band Aaroh. On 16 July 2010 Strings released their single "Ab Khud Kuch Karna Paray Ga", featuring former Jal lead vocalist Atif Aslam. In October Strings, in collaboration with Emirates International Mobile Humanitarian Hospital for Children, distributed over 500 gift packs to children displaced by the 2010 Pakistan floods who were living in the Sujawal relief camp.

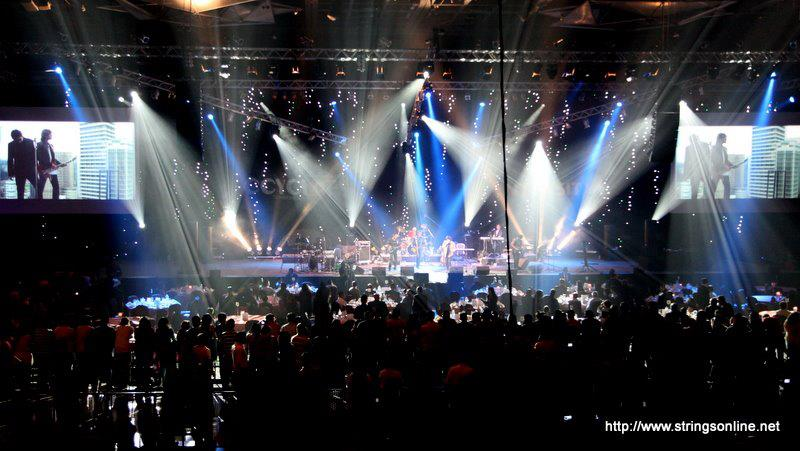
Strings in Dubai

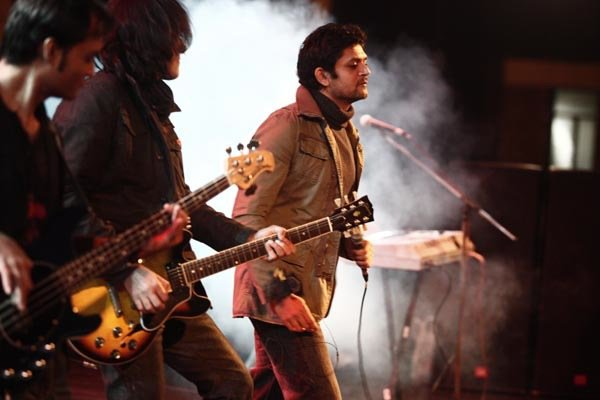
Shakir Khan (left), Bilal Maqsood (centre), Faisal Kapadia (right); Strings at LUMS 2010

=== 2011 to 2017 ===
In February 2011, Strings performed at Pearl, the annual cultural festival at Birla Institute of Technology and Science, Pilani – Hyderabad in Hyderabad. The following month they played at the Aman Ki Asha concert in Ahmedabad with the Indian band Indian Ocean, releasing "Mein Tou Dekhoonga" on 28 March and its music video (directed by Jamshed Mehmood) on 4 April. The band also performed with Shafqat Amanat Ali in Dubai. Later in April Strings became brand ambassadors for Levi's Pakistan, and on 13 May the band performed at the Pakistani Embassy in Riyadh, Saudi Arabia. On 26 May Levi's Original Music released a promo with Strings and Zoe Viccaji and a music video of an a cappella version of "Mera Bichra Yaar" with Zoe Viccaji four days later. On 4 June, Strings performed at the Beach Luxury Hotel. The band began with "Koi Aanay Wala Hai", the title song from their 2008 album. They followed with "Najane Kyun", dedicated to the journalists who sacrificed their lives in the line of duty, "Zinda Hoon", "Mein Tou Dekhoonga" and "Sohniyae". On 10 June, a cover version of "Anjane" with Bilal Khan and Zoe Viccaji was released by Levi's Original Music.

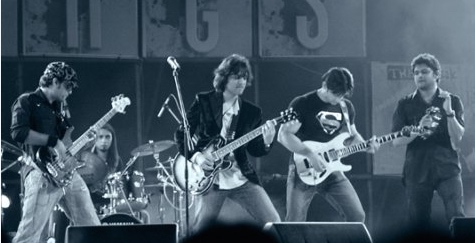
Strings on stage

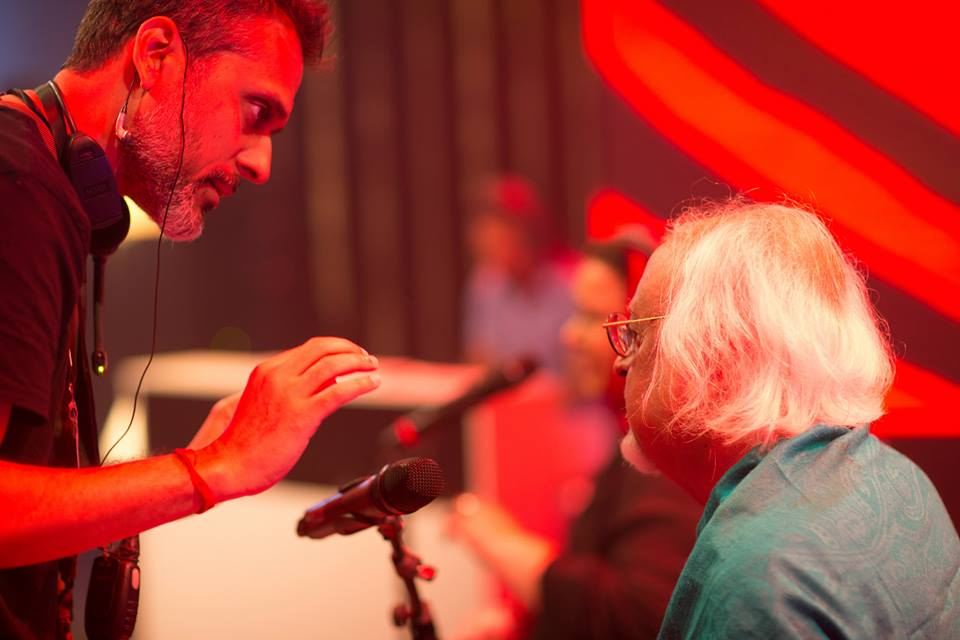
Bilal Maqsood with Anwar Maqsood, Coke Studio Season 8

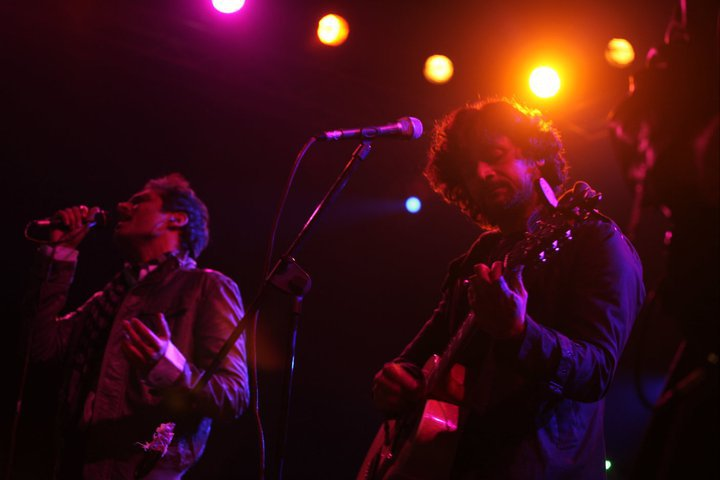
Strings performing live at Lahore University of Management Sciences in 2011

On 1 August, in an interview with The Express Tribune, Strings confirmed that they were working on two new songs: "Tum Hi To Ho" and "Goli Maray". Kapadia said, "The whole idea behind going into a recording studio and making a bunch of new songs is just to have fun. We strongly believe that coming out with new music helps us grow and reinvent ourselves as musicians." On 15 August, in an interview on the BBC Hindi show Music Beyond Borders, they discussed the political situation in Pakistan, performed "Mein Toh Dekhoonga" and covered the Indian Ocean song "Bandeh" at the request of Indian Ocean lead vocalist Rahul Ram. On 26 August, Bollywood director Sanjay Gupta confirmed that Strings would provide music for the soundtrack to his movie Shootout at Wadala. Several days later Maqsood and Kapadia, in India, confirmed that they were composing music for the Bollywood film; Ekta Kapoor and Sanjay Gupta reportedly hosted a surprise party for the duo, with many celebrities on the guest list. On 28 August, the Hindustan Times reported that actor Imran Khan organised a special screening of his comedy Delhi Belly for Strings. In September, the Express Tribune reported that Strings and Atif Aslam were nominated for the Best Singer award at the 2011 Lux Style Awards for their collaboration "Ab Khud Kuch Karna Paray Ga". On 3 November the band performed at Waves '12, the cultural festival of the BITS Pilani Goa. A recent Pepsi commercial features Strings.

In April 2013, Strings joined Meesha Shafi, Ali Azmat, Shahzad Hasan and Alamgir as judges on the vocal-talent show Cornetto Music Icons on ARY Digital.

On 29 October 2017, Strings announced its farewell to Coke Studio after season 10. In 2018, they announced new videos from their new album, to mark 30 years of Strings.

A romantic number, "Piya R"e is in top list. It has been written by Anwar Maqsood and Bilal Maqsood. The song has been mixed and mastered by M. Ishaq Nazir.

=== 2018 to 2021: 30 ===
Strings released a teaser of their upcoming single "Sajni" on 2 March 2018 on their Facebook page. Later the band's lead singer Faisal Kapadia confirmed the release of their sixth studio album 30, as 2018 marked 30 years of Strings. Sajni is one of the eight songs from the upcoming album. The official video for their first single "Sajni" was released on their official YouTube channel on 17 March 2018. Strings released their second track "Urr Jaoon" on their YouTube channel on 6 April 2018.

On 25 March 2021, Faisal Kapadia and Bilal Maqsood officially announced that the band is coming to an end on Instagram.

== Music ==
Sar Kiye Yeh Pahar
Sar Kiye Yeh Pahar, Strings single from the album Duur. The song is written and composed by Bilal Maqsood.

=== Language ===
From their debut album Strings to their fifth album Koi Aanay Wala Hai, all Strings' songs are in Urdu. Most lyrics are by Anwar Maqsood; a few songs are by his son, musician Bilal Maqsood, and writer Zehra Nigah.

=== Influences ===
Strings' music is influenced by Eastern classical music and Western rhythms. With an emphasis on Eastern melodies (including a touch of raga in the vocals), the band use flute and sarangi to give their vocals an Eastern touch. Songs such as "Duur" and "Sar Kiye Yeh Pahar" (from Duur) and "Kahani Mohabat Ki" (from Dhaani) are examples of this influence. Other songs, such as "Sohniyae" and "Najane Kyun" (from Dhaani) have elements of rock music. Bands influencing Strings include Junoon and Nazia and Zoheb.

=== Style ===
Strings perform a blend of Western music and classical Eastern music, combining rhythmic guitar riffs with the tranquility of Eastern music. Their music is also based on worldly issues, emphasising world peace. Their music (such as "Ab Khud Kuch Karna Paray Ga", "Beirut", "Jheet Lo Dil" and "Titliyan") has helped keep national spirits high. Their music has been enjoyed by Pakistani youth for over ten years, compensating internationally for the departure of Vital Signs and Nazia and Zoheb. While Nusrat Fateh Ali Khan promoted Qawwali music and Junoon rock music, Strings blend Pakistani pop, classical music and rhythms on stringed instruments.

Although Strings' music revolves around a male lead singer, the band has also featured other artists on their albums. Since the release of their third album, Duur, their music has combined Eastern and Western music. Their fourth and fifth albums (Dhaani and Koi Aanay Wala Hai) featured rock songs such as "Sohniyae", "Mera Bichra Yaar", "Koi Aanay Wala Hai" and "Jab Say Tumko". Several of the band's singles have been used on soundtracks for Bollywood and Hollywood films, including "Najane Kyun" (Spider-Man 2), "Zinda Hoon" (Zinda) and "Aakhri Alvida" (Shootout at Lokhandwala).

=== Live performances ===
Strings have achieved international fame, and their popularity is attributed to their unique music and lyrics. Other internationally known musicians include Nusrat Fateh Ali Khan, Junoon, Nazia Hassan, Jal and Vital Signs. Even in Nepal, influenced by neighbouring Indian music, Strings proved popular and were named Asia's favourite band at the MTV Asia Awards. They were the first Pakistani band to perform at Rashtrapati Bhavan.

== Members ==
- Faisal Kapadia – Vocals (1988–1992, 1999–present)
- Bilal Maqsood – Lead guitar, vocals (1988–1992, 1999–present)
- Aahad Nayani – Drums (2010–present)
- Haider Ali – Keyboards (2006–present)
- Adeel Ali – Lead guitar (2001–present)
- Bradley D'Souza (2015–present)

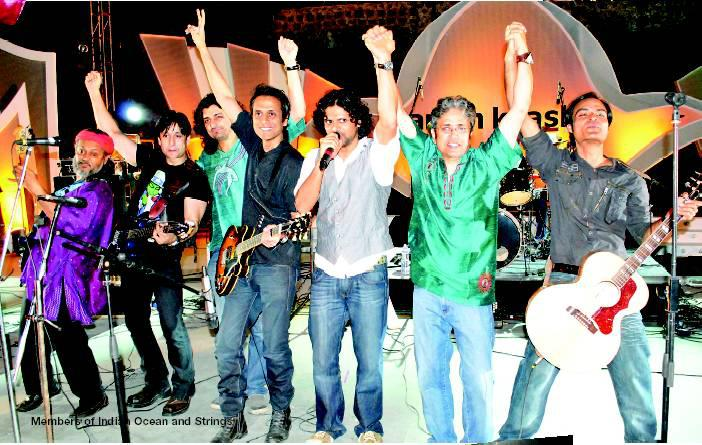
Indian Ocean with Strings – Left to right; Rahul Ram, Adeel Ali, Amit Kalim, Bilal Maqsood, Faisal Kapadia, Susmit, Shakir Khan – AMAN KI ASHA

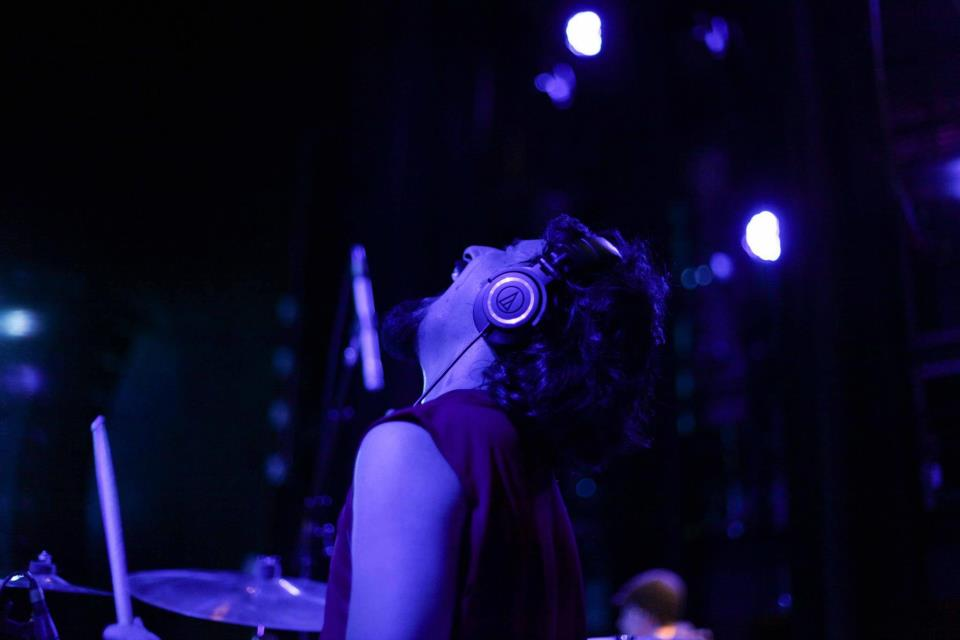
Aahad Nayani

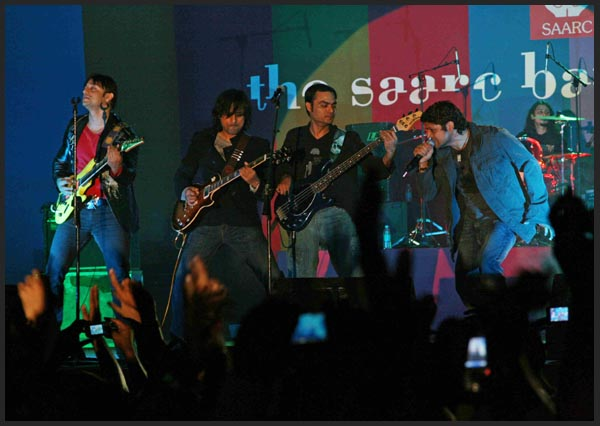
Left to right: Adeel Ali, Bilal Maqsood, Shakir Khan, Faisal Kapadia

Former members

- Shakir Khan – Bassist (2004–2013)
- Qaiser – Drummer (2004–2010)
- Rafiq Wazir Ali – Synthesizer (1988–1992)
- Kareem Bashir Bhoy – Bass guitar, backing vocals (1988–1992)

== Awards and honours ==
- Best Band – MTV Music Awards 2009
- Best Album – MTV Music Awards 2009
- Brand ambassadors, Honda City 2009
- Nominated for Pakistani torch bearers, 2008 Olympic Games
- Motorola brand ambassadors for Pakistan
- Best Live Act in Music, Lux Style Awards 2008
- Most Wanted Band, The Musik Awards 2008
- Best Lyrics ("Aakhari Alvida"), The Musik Awards 2008
- Best Artist, MTV Asia Awards
- Favourite Artist India (title song for movie, Zinda) 2005
- Motorola Icon, The Musik Awards 2006
- Nominated for Most Wanted Band, The Musik Awards 2006
- "Zinda" nominated for Best Pop Song and Most Wanted Song, The Musik Awards 2006
- Best Video ("Anjaane"), Lux Style Awards 2003
- Lux Style Award, 2004
- Best Band at the first Sangeet Awards ceremony held at the Royal Albert Hall
- Indus Music Award (2005) for contributions to pop music
- MTV Asia's Most Favourite Band, 2005
- Best Band, third Jazz Indus Music Awards
- Best Lyrics ("Zinda"), third Jazz Indus Music Awards
- Excellence in Music Award, Hum Style Awards 2018

== Discography ==
=== Studio albums ===
Year	Title	Label
1990	Strings	EMI
1992	2	Shalimar Recording Company
2000	Duur	Sound Master, Magnasound
2003	Dhaani	Sadaf Stereo, Sony BMG India
2008	Koi Aanay Wala Hai	Fire Records, Sony BMG India
2019	Thirty	MainStage Productions

=== Compilation albums ===
Year	Title	Label
2003	Hai Koi Hum Jaisa	Sadaf Records
2003	Tu Hai Kahan	

=== Lollywood ===
Year	Film	Film Director	Language
2015	Moor	Jami	Urdu

=== Bollywood ===
Year	Song	Film
2005	Yeh Hai Meri Kahani	Zinda
2007	Aakhri Alvida	Shootout at Lokhandwala
2013	Chaaron Taraf	John Day

=== Hollywood ===
Year	Song	Film
2004	Najane Kyun	Spider-Man 2

=== Solo Music Albums ===
Year	Solo	Album
2024	Zindagi Jahaan Le Jaaye	Faisal Kapadia
2021	Rhymes Urdu Album for Nursery Kids	Bilal Maqsood
2026	Naya Naya	Bilal Maqsood

=== Singles ===
Year	Song	Video Director	Additional Notes
2010	"Ab Khud Kuch Karna Paray Ga"	Jami	The song also featured Atif Aslam
2011	"Mein Tou Dekhoonga"	Jami	
2018	"Sajni"	Yasir Jaswal	Singles from Thirty
2018	"Urr Jaoon"	Jami	Singles from Thirty
2018	"Piya Re"	Asma Humayun	Singles from Thirty
2018	"Mil Gaya"	Kamal Khan	Singles from Thirty
2018	"Chal Para"	Mohsin Kamal	Singles from Thirty
2018	"Hum Dono"	Faisal kapadia	Singles from Thirty
2019	"Naina" (featuring Sona Mohapatra)		Singles from Thirty
2019	"Raat Shabnami"	Yasir Jaswal	Singles from Thirty
2020	"Pyar Ka Rog"		Velo Sound Station Season 1 (Last song issued by the band)

=== Coke Studio ===
Year	Season	Featured artists
2014	Season 7	Abbas Ali Khan, Abida Parveen, Abrarul Haq, Akhtar Chanal Zahri, Asrar, Fariha Pervez, Humaira Channa, Javed Bashir, Jawad Ahmed, Komal Rizvi, Meesha Shafi, Rahma Ali, Rahat Fateh Ali Khan, Sajjad Ali, Ustad Rais Khan, Zohaib Hassan, Zoe Viccaji, Ustad Tafu, Jimmy Khan, Usman Riaz, Momin Durrani, Naseer & Shahab, Niazi Brothers, Sara Haider
2015	Season 8	Ali Azmat, Ali Haider, Ali Sethi, Ali Zafar, Alycia Dias, Arif Lohar, Atif Aslam, Ustad Hamid Ali Khan, Qurat-ul-Ain Balouch, Sara Raza Khan, Shazia Manzoor, Rizwan & Muazzam, Farida Khanum, Mekaal Hasan Band (Mekaal Hasan, Gino Banks, Sheldon D'Silva, Sharmistha Chatterjee), Nabeel Shaukat Ali, Gul Panra, Surriya Khanum, Umair Jaswal, Karam Abbas Khan, Mai Dhai, Fizza Javed, Asim Azhar, Mulazim Hussain, Kavish (Jaffer Zaidi and Maaz Maudood), Malang Party (Zeeshan Mansoor, Ibrahim, Zain Ali), Bakshi Brothers (Aafi Bakhshi, Yawar Bakshi, Bilal Bakshi and Sherry Bakshi), Nafees Ahmed, Samra Khan, Sara Haider, Siege (Junaid Younus, Muhammad Ahsan & Parvaiz), Shehroze Hussan (sitarist)
2016	Season 9	Abida Parveen, Ahmed Jahanzeb, Ali Azmat, Ali Khan, Ali Sethi, Amjad Sabri, Asim Azhar, Basit Ali, Damia Farooq, Haroon Shahid, Jabar Abbas, Javed Bashir, Junaid Khan, Kashif Ali, Masuma Anwar, Meesha Shafi, Mehwish Hayat, Mohsin Abbas Haider, noori, Momina Mustehsan, Naeem Abbas Rufi, Naseebo Lal, Natasha Khan, Nirmal Roy, Noor I, Qurat-ul-Ain Balouch, Rafaqat Ali Khan, Rahat Fateh Ali Khan, Rizwan Butt, Rachel Viccaji, Saieen Zahoor, Sanam Marvi, Sara Haider, Shahzad Nawaz, Shilpa Rao, Sheraz Uppal, Umair Jaswal, Zebunnisa Bangash
2017	Season 10	Ahmed Jahanzeb, Aima Baig, Akbar Ali, Ali Hamza, Ali Noor, Ali Sethi, Ali Zafar, Amanat Ali, Arieb Azhar, Attaullah Khan Esakhelvi, Danyal Zafar, Faiza Mujahid, Faraz Anwar, Farhan Saeed, Hina Nasrullah, Humaira Channa, Humera Arshad, Irteassh, Jabar Abbas, Jaffer Zaidi, Javed Bashir, Kaavish, Meekal Hasan, Momina Mustehsan, Nabeel Shaukat Ali, Natasha Khan, Nirmal Roy, Qurat-ul-Ain Balouch, Rachel Viccaji, Rahat Fateh Ali Khan, Sahir Ali Bagga, Sajjad Ali, Salman Ahmad, Sanwal Khan Esakhelvi, Shafqat Amanat Ali Khan, Strings, Shani Arshad, Shuja Haider, Umair Jaswal, Waqar Ehsin, Zaw Ali

== See also ==
- List of Pakistani music bands
