= Zehra Nigah =

Pakistani poet (born 1935)

- زہرا نگاہ
- Born: 14 May 1935 (age 91); Hyderabad, Hyderabad State, British India
- Occupations: Poet, Scriptwriter, Lyricist
- Relatives: Fatima Surayya Bajia (sister); Zubaida Tariq (sister); Anwar Maqsood (brother)

Zehra Nigah (Urdu: زہرا نگاہ) is a prominent Urdu poet and scriptwriter from Pakistan, affectionately known as 'Zehra Apa'. As one of the pioneers of Urdu poetry by women, Nigah was one of the first female poets to gain recognition in a male-dominated field. Nigah's achievements are particularly notable in the realm of mushaira, where she is regarded as the first female poet to fully participate and leave a lasting impact. Additionally, Nigah occasionally works as a songwriter and scriptwriter.

Highly revered in the literary community for her blend of modern feminine and classic poetry, Nigah is esteemed not only for her expertise but also for her charismatic personality. She frequently presides over literary events and sessions, including serving as the chair of the presidium for both the Aalmi Urdu Conference and the Women's Conference. Nigah has received numerous accolades, including the Pride of Performance (2006), the LLF Lifetime Achievement Award (2013), the Allama Iqbal Award (2018), the UBL Literary Lifetime Award (2019), and the Arts Council Lifetime Achievement Award (2021). Her notable works include "Shaam Ka Pehla Tara," "Warq," "Firaq," and "Gul Chandni." Her poetry compilation, "Lafz," was published in 2023.

== Personal life ==
Zehra was born in Hyderabad, British India. She was 10 years old when she and her family migrated to Pakistan after the 1947 partition of India. Her father was a civil servant with an interest in poetry. Zehra's elder sister, Fatima Surayya Bajia, was also a writer. One of her brothers, Anwar Maqsood, is a writer, satirist and a television host and another brother, Ahmad Maqsood was Secretary to the Government of Sindh. Zehra married Majid Ali, who was a civil servant and had interest in Sufi poetry.

== Career ==
Zehra Nigah began her writing career during her childhood. When she was 14 years old, she learned the poetry of prominent poets by heart. She herself began to compose at the age of 14 and at 15 was already participating in a mushaira in India. She is inspired by classical tradition of Urdu poetry.

Front Line magazine states:

Around 1922, the living room in Zehra's family home used to serve as the centre stage for historic meetings of poets of the stature of Iqbal, Firaq, Makhdoom, Faiz Ahmad Faiz and Majaz. "Academics, poetry and music completed my home", she says, adding, "My mother used to learn music from her ustaad [teacher] from behind a purdah. My maternal grandfather used to encourage us children to revise tough poets like Haali and Iqbal with correct meanings, pronunciations and reading style. He would tempt us by saying, 'If you memorise Iqbal's Jawab-e-Shikwa or Musaddas-e-Hali, you will get five rupees.' And we would wield all our energies to memorise them. Such was my training that at four I had learnt the correct recitation style and pronunciation and by the time I was 14, I had learnt the masterpieces of most big poets by heart.

In 2012, an event was held by the fellow writers at the Arts Council of Pakistan, Karachi to launch a CD of Zehra Nigah's poetry in her own voice. The event was presided over by the writer Intizar Hussain and also included the famous humorist Mushtaq Ahmed Yousufi.

== Awards and recognition ==
- She received the Pride of Performance Award from the President of Pakistan in 2006. She was later awarded the Hilal-i-Imtiaz (Pakistan's second-highest civilian honor) under her official registered name, Zahra Majid Ali, by President Asif Ali Zardari on 13 May 2026. According to a major newspaper of India, "Zehra Nigah is a much loved and highly respected poet in Pakistan."

== Honours ==
- Speaker, Special Lecture Series of Aga Khan University 2013
- Chief Guest, Convocation of IVS 2014
- Chair, launch of Shaam-e-Sher-e-Yaaran by Mushtaq Ahmed Yousufi 2014
- Chair, launch of Digital Poetry Collection of Dr. Pirzada Qasim 2014
- Keynote Speaker, Islamabad Literature Festival 2014
- Keynote Speaker, Karachi Literature Festival 2015
- Keynote Speaker, Islamabad Literature Festival 2015
- Member Presidium Panel, Launch of Arzu Center at Habib University 2015

== Publications ==
- Shaam Ka Pehla Tara
- Waraq
- Firaaq
- Gul Chandni

== See also ==
- List of Pakistani poets
- List of Urdu language poets
- Fatima Surayya Bajia
- Anwar Maqsood
- Zubaida Tariq
