= Samra Khan =

Samra Khan سمرہ خان
- Born: Samra Khan
- Occupation: Singer
- Years active: 2015–present

Samra Khan (Urdu: سمرہ خان) is a Dubai-based, Pakistani singer. She is the winner of the reality show Music Garage and singer of “Hina Ki khushboo” Coke Studio Season 8.

== Early life ==
She earned an MBA degree from the Institute of Business Management. She works as a banker. She pursued singing as a profession when she got a chance to sing in Coke Studio. She sang a duet "Hina Ki Khushbu" in a Coke Studio Season 8 along with Asim Azhar that made her dedicate herself to singing.

She has been a singer since she was 6 years old. After releasing “Hina ki khushbu”, Khan released solo songs “Bol” and “Teri Sohbat” in collaboration with Playback Lounge, which were well received by the audience.

She sang OSTs for different Pakistani dramas. Her famous OSTs are "Yeh Raha Dil" and "Gila”. Khan competed in a really show called Music Garage, and ended up winning the Best Singer Award in 2018.

== Discography ==
Year	Song	Co-singer	Note
2015	Hina Ki khushboo	Asim Azhar	Coke Studio Season 8
2016	Teri Sohbat	Atif Ali	Playback Lounge
2016	Bol	Atif Ali	Playback Lounge
2016	Gila (OST)	Atif Ali	MD Productions
2017	Yeh Raha Dil (OST)	Atif Ali	MD Productions
2018	Mein Haar Gayi		Music Garage
2019	Baat Unkahi (featured with Kaavish)		Kaavish

|- |2020 |Tera Yahan Koi nahi (OST) | |MD Productions |-

|}
