= Faisal Kapadia =

Pakistani musician

Faisal Kapadia فیصل کپاڈیا
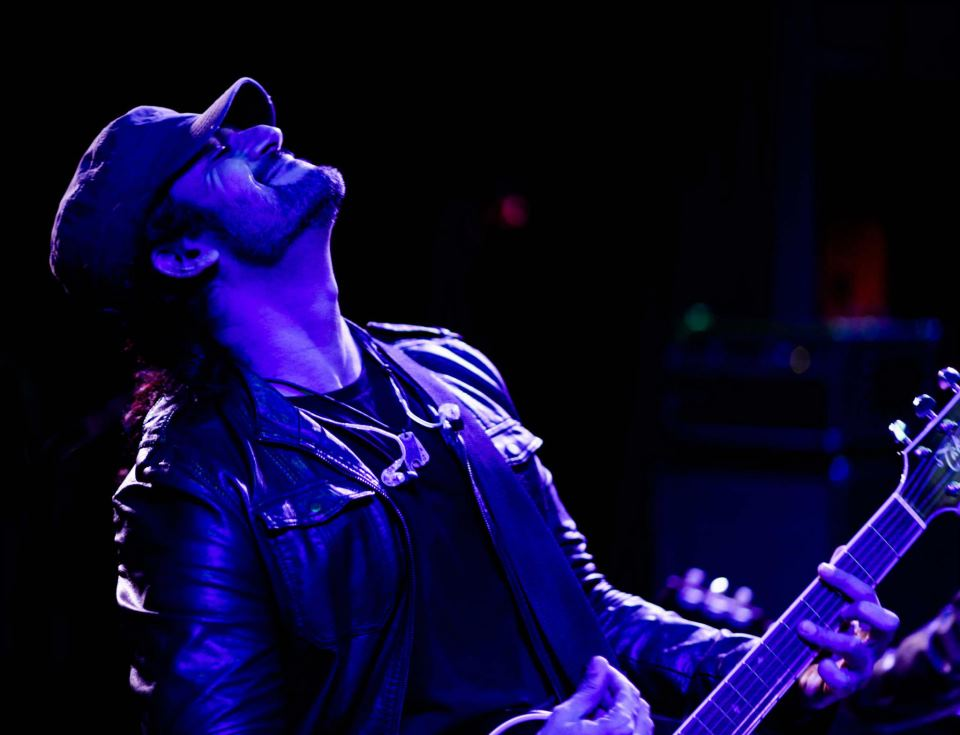

Background information
- Born: June 29, 1971 (age 55); Karachi, Pakistan
- Genres: Pop rock; alternative rock; fusion; Rock music
- Occupations: Singer-songwriter; guitarist; song producer
- Instruments: Vocals; guitar
- Years active: 1988–present
- Labels: EMI; Fire Records; Sony BMG

Faisal Kapadia (Urdu: فیصل کپاڈیا) is a Pakistani musician, composer, singer-songwriter, and guitarist. He is best known as the lead vocalist and primary lyricist of rock music band Strings. After Strings disband, he started singing as solo artist. Faisal Kapadia has directed a number of music videos for his band. Strings made its entry into the Bollywood music in 2006.

He, along with fellow Strings member Bilal Maqsood, has been a UNICEF Goodwill Ambassador for Pakistan since September 2005.

== Career ==
=== Strings ===
In 1988, the band Strings was formed along with three other members Bilal Maqsood, Rafiq Wazir Ali and Kareem Bashir Bhoy, who were all classmates.

=== Solo career ===
After Strings was disbanded, Kapadia continued as a solo singer. He started as solo singer from Coke Studio Pakistan.

== Personal life ==
Kapadia is of Gujarati descent, his family hailing from Rajkot. Indian actress Dimple Kapadia's father was his cousin. He has cited Kishore Kumar and R. D. Burman as influences in addition to U2, Bryan Adams, Sting and Bon Jovi.

== Strings discography ==
Albums with Strings

- Strings (1990)
- 2 (1992)
- Duur (2000)
- Dhaani (2003)
- Koi Aanay Wala Hai (2008)
- 30 (2018)

Compilation album

- Hai Koi Hum Jaisa (2003)
- Tu Hai Kahaan (2003)

== Solo discography ==
Albums

- Zindagi Jahaan Le Jaaye (2024)

== Coke Studio Pakistan ==
- Season 07 (2014) to Season 10 (2017) as a music producer and director.

== See also ==
- Strings (band)
