= Sara Haider =

Pakistani singer-songwriter and actress

- سارہ حیدر
- Born: Karachi, Pakistan
- Occupations: Musical actress, singer-songwriter
- Musical career
- Genres: Pop
- Instrument: Vocals
- Years active: 2014–present
- Label: Coke Studio

Sara Haider is a Pakistani singer-songwriter and musical and film actress from Karachi. She started her music career as a backing vocalist and later became singer at Coke Studio. She has also won a Lux Style Award after making her debut in Coke Studio.

== Life and career ==
Sara Haider was born in Karachi, Pakistan. She started her career as a musical actress by performing in stage musical Grease. She also performed at Ufone Uth Records and Apeejay Kolkata Literary Festival in India. In 2014, Sara joined Coke Studio season 7 where she served as backing vocalist. She gained public recognition in Coke Studio season 8 where she made her debut with the song "Ae Dil" featuring Ali Zafar She has also won Lux Style Awards for "Best Emerging Talent". She will make her debut in film by appearing in the upcoming short-drama film Khaemae Mein Matt Jhankain which is scheduled for release at Zeal for Unity film festival in India and Pakistan. She graduated from American Academy of Dramatic Arts and won the prestigious Charles Jehlinger Award.

== Filmography ==
- Law & Order as Defense Attorney Wendy Stratford (2024)
- Khaemae Mein Matt Jhankain

== Discography ==
- Ae Dil – Coke Studio (Pakistani season 8)
- Meri Meri – Coke Studio (Pakistani season 9)
- Ja Ba Ja
- Zindagi – Pepsi Battle of the Bands
- Dekha De Rung Apna – Levi Strauss & Co.
- Khayal Rakhna – Strepsils Stereo

== Awards and nominations ==
Year	Award	Category	Result
2015	Lux Style Award	Best Emerging Talent	Won
2019	Charles Jehlinger Award	Best Student	Won
