= Bilal Maqsood =

Pakistani musical artist

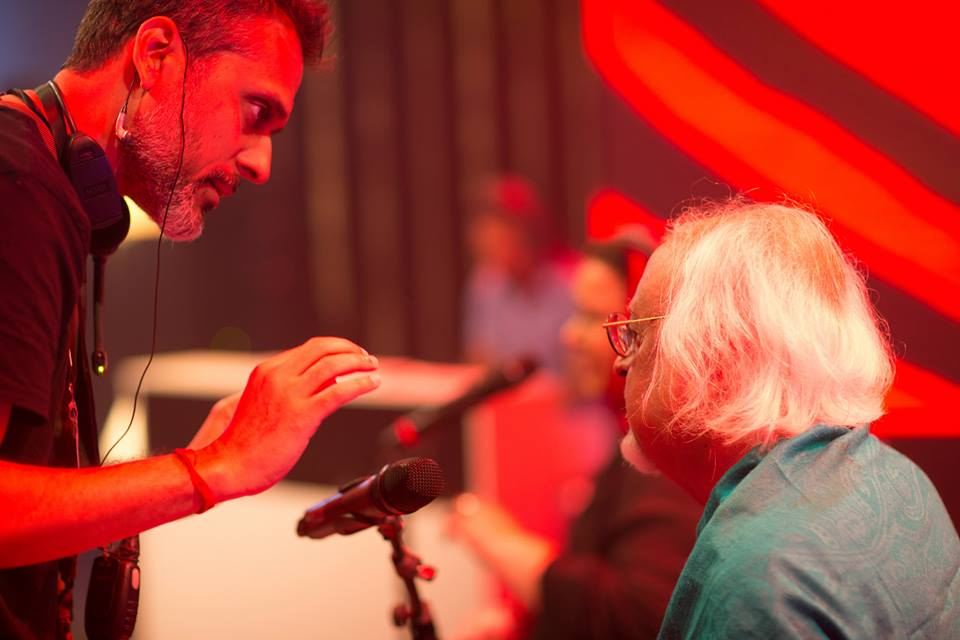
- Maqsood (left) with his father, Anwar Maqsood

Background information
- Born: 23 March 1971 (age 55); Karachi, Sindh, Pakistan
- Occupations: Singer-songwriter; composer; Music video director; Painter
- Instruments: Guitar; Bass; Vocals
- Years active: 1988–present

Bilal Maqsood (Urdu: بلال مقصود) is a Pakistani singer-songwriter, composer, music video director and painter, better known for being a founding member of the pop-rock band Strings (1988–2021).

== Early life and education ==
Bilal Maqsood is the son of the popular writer, actor, artist, TV host and comedian Anwar Maqsood. His mother Imrana Maqsood is a novelist and playwright who has written children's books and cookbooks and is the recipient of numerous national awards.

He is an alumnus of the Indus Valley School of Art and Architecture. Graduating in 1994, he had studied communication design.

== Music career ==
=== Strings (1988–2021) ===
For Bilal and his band Strings, formed in 1988, success came in 1992 after the launch of the song Sar Kiye Yeh Pahar, which was well received by the public. The quartet disbanded in 1992 so the members could concentrate on their studies and came back years later in 1999, with Bilal Maqsood and Faisal Kapadia now forming a duo even if other artists would complement them during the live performances. Generally, the band's music was composed by Bilal while the lyrics were penned by his father Anwar Maqsood.

Strings made its entry into the Bollywood music scene in 2006, when the band sang Yeh Hai Meri Kahani for the movie Zinda, the single topping the charts.

Srings disbanded in 2021.

=== Solo career (2022–present) ===
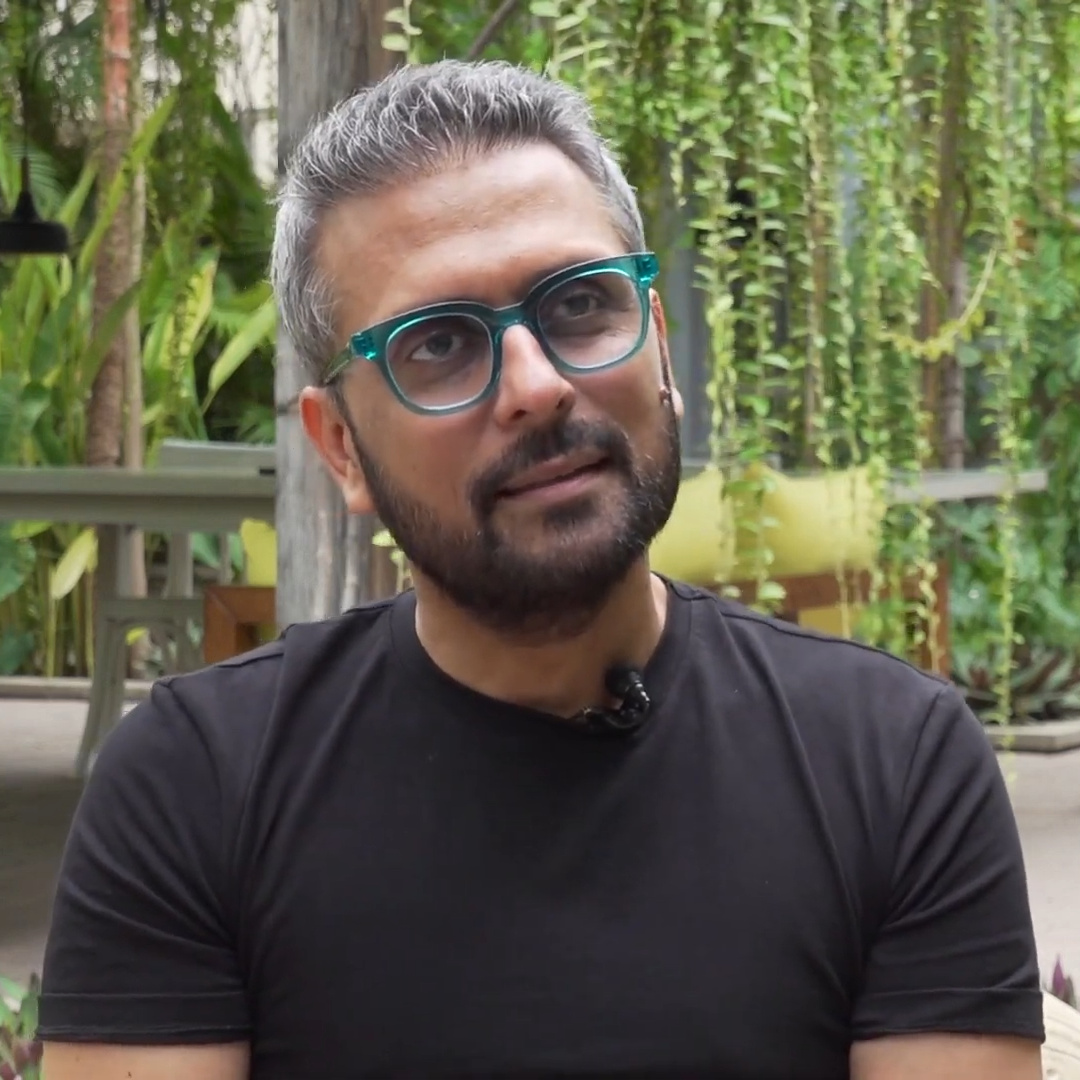
Bilal Maqsood in 2023

After his departure from Strings following 33 years of activities, Bilal launched his solo music career with gigs in Karachi and Lahore.

In May 2022, he released his first solo single, Naya Naya, which he co-wrote with his father.

Later the same year he released the album Urdu Nursery Rhymes, having written, sung and composed eight nursery rhymes so children could get closer to the Urdu language. He developed an online series for children named Pakkay Dost (transl. Good friends) in the vein of Sesame Street to further bolster children's entertainment in Urdu; the first episode was released in September 2023.

In April 2026, he released the song O’ Re Saajna.

== Other work ==
=== Music production and music video direction ===
He was the director and co-producer of Coke Studio Pakistan from 2014 to 2017 and has also directed a number of music videos for his band as well for other artists.

In 2020, he became the director and executive producer of another musical show, Velo Sound Station, for its first season.

=== Painting ===
Before seriously pursuing a career in music he was a painter, having his paintings exhibited at the Pakistan American Cultural Center in Karachi while he was still a student at the Indus Valley School of Art & Architecture.

Since the end of Strings he's spending time on painting again, involving his son Mikael Maqsood in the process as well.

=== UNICEF ===
As part of Strings, he was a UNICEF Goodwill Ambassador for HIV/AIDS in Pakistan in from September 2005 to 2006.

=== Pakistan Idol ===
He was among the judges of the reality singing competition show Pakistan Idol's season 2.

== Strings discography ==
Original albums

- Strings (1990)
- 2 (1992)
- Duur (2000)
- Dhaani (2003)
- Koi Aanay Wala Hai (2008)
- 30 (2018)

Compilation albums

- Hai Koi Hum Jaisa (2003)
- Tu Hai Kahaan (2003)

== Videography ==
- Sar Kiye Yeh Pahaar (début video of his band Strings)
- Maula (the last video shot by Vital Signs)
- Us Rah Par (featuring Vital Signs)
- Beirut (Strings)

== Gallery ==
Bilal Maqsood's pitograms
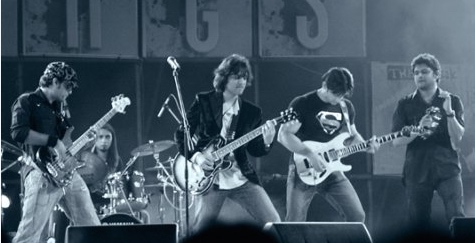
Left to right: Shakir Khan, Bilal Maqsood, Adeel Ali, Faisal Kapadia

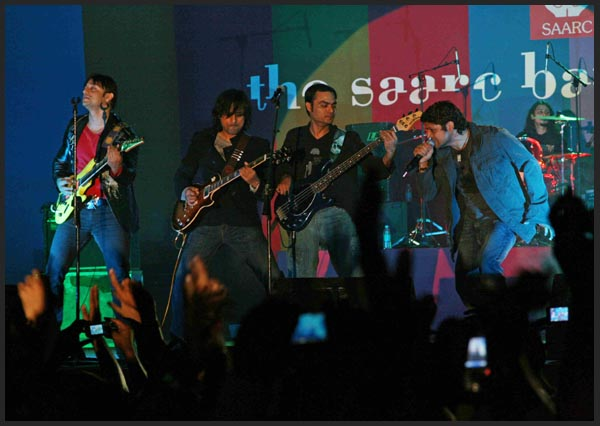
Maqsood (center left) performing in Dubai in 2009

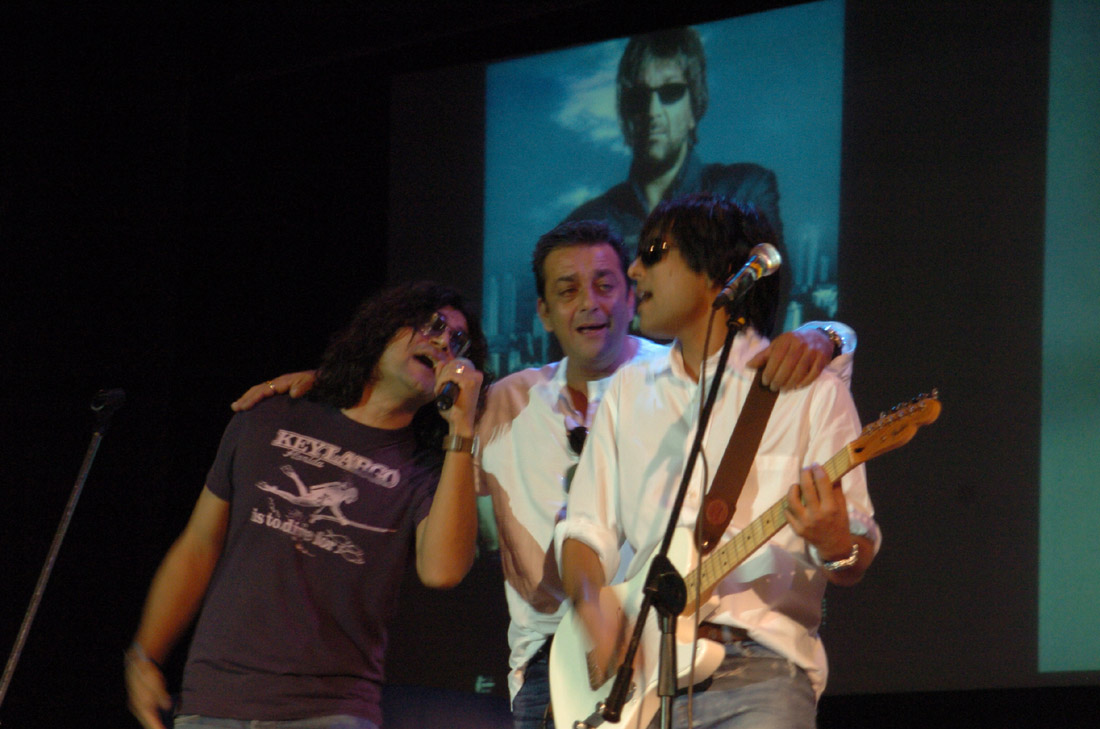
Maqsood (right) performing at the closing ceremony of the 36th International Film Festival of India Panaji, Goa on 4 December 2005

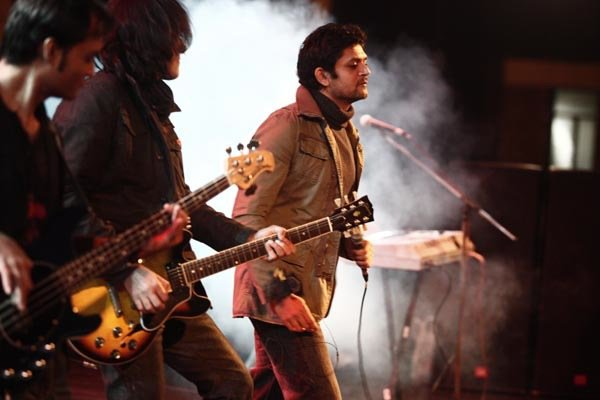
Maqsood (center) at LUMS in 2010

== See also ==
- Strings
