= Anwar Maqsood =

Pakistani satirist and scriptwriter (born 1939)

Anwar Maqsood انور مقصود HI PP
- انور مقصود حمیدی
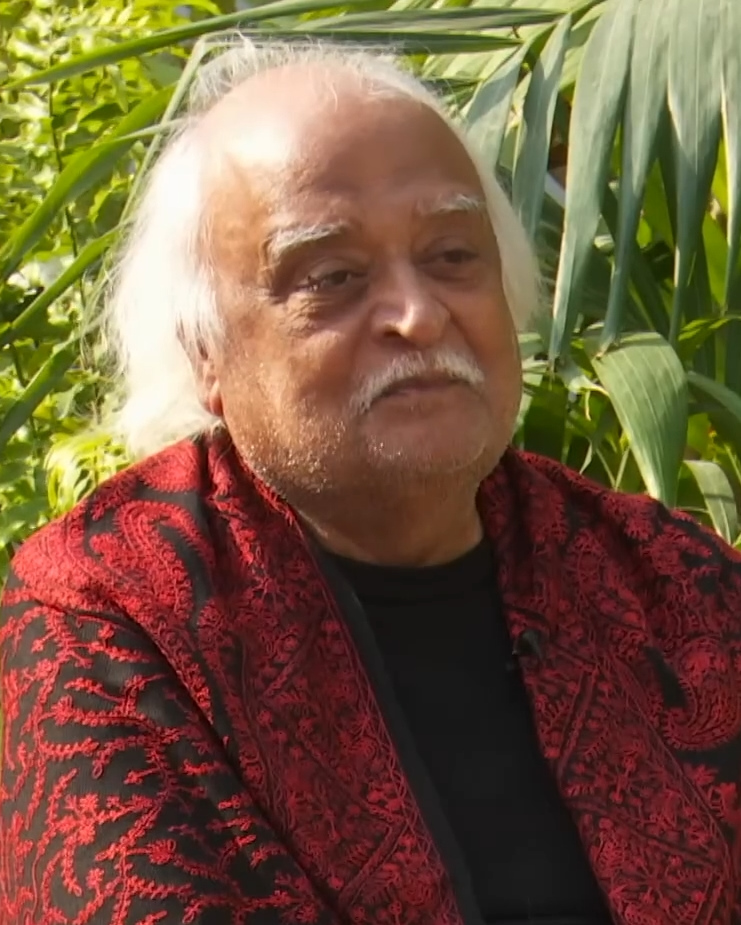
- Maqsood during the interview by BBC
- Born: Anwar Maqsood Hameedi; 7 September 1939 (age 87); Hyderabad, Hyderabad Deccan
- Occupations: Playwright; Lyricist; Satirist; Television host Painter
- Spouse: Imrana Maqsood
- Children: Bilal Maqsood (son); Arjumand Ahmed (daughter)
- Relatives: Zubaida Tariq (sister); Fatima Surayya Bajia (sister); Zehra Nigah (sister); Sarah Naqvi (sister)
- Writing career
- Subject: Entertainment
- Notable awards: Hilal-e-Imtiaz (Crescent of Excellence) in 2013; Pride of Performance in 1994

Anwar Maqsood Hameedi (Note: Urdu: انور مقصود حمیدی) (born 7 September 1939) is a Pakistani scriptwriter, television presenter, satirist, humorist, painter and infrequent actor. He is well known for his drama write-ups for PTV in the late 1970s and 1980s.

== Early life and family ==
Anwar Maqsood was born on 7 September 1939 in Hyderabad State. He studied at the Gulbarga Trust School in Aurangabad. His large family migrated to Karachi in September 1948, after the creation of Pakistan in 1947. His maternal grandfather was a commissioner and a writer, a disciple of the Urdu poet Daagh Dehlvi, and the only item the family took with them when moving to Karachi was his collection of 20,000 books. His childhood years were spent in PIB Colony, Karachi with his siblings and family.

Maqsood belongs to a prominent family of Pakistan, and some of his siblings are well known in their own right; his sister, Fatima Surayya Bajia, was a well-known writer in Pakistan and South Asia whose marriage ended early in divorce. She then chose to play a key role in the upbringing of her nine young brothers and sisters and became a maternal figure to them. Another sister, Zehra Nigah, is a relatively well-known poet. One of his brothers, Ahmed Maqsood, is a former Chief Secretary Sindh; and his sister, Zubaida Tariq was a cooking expert and chef. His wife, Imrana Maqsood, is a known novelist and his son, Bilal Maqsood is a rock artist, lead guitarist and vocalist of former rock band Strings. He has one daughter. A book on the life and work of Anwar Maqsood titled Uljhey Suljhey Anwar (الجھے سلجھے انور) was written by his wife, Imrana Maqsood, herself a novelist and playwright.

Anwar Maqsood received his education in Pakistan. He completed his matriculation from St. Patrick's High School, Karachi. He then went on to study at the Sindh Muslim Government Law College, also in Karachi. He graduated with a degree in Law and began his career as a lawyer. However, he soon realized that his true passion was in the field of painting, creative writing and entertainment, and he transitioned into the field of scriptwriting, television hosting, and comedy. Following his graduation, he was for some time the editor of the magazine Hurriyat but had to leave as a result of an editorial critical of General Zia-ul-Haq.

== Career ==
=== Painting ===
Before turning to writing/satire, Anwar Maqsood was a painter, grabbing the attention of senior artists such as Sadequain and Shakir Ali, but later concentrated on writing following the footsteps of his sisters. His paintings have been exhibited.

=== Music ===
Anwar Maqsood’s first job was with EMI Pakistan, and he met artists such as Ghulam Farid Sabri and Fareeda Khanum. He has his own library of classical music containing hundreds of hours of recordings. He also wrote lyrics for the band Strings.

=== Television ===
Anwar Maqsood has been associated for many years with PTV where he served as a television presenter for a variety of television programs including Studio Dhai and then Studio Ponay Teen along with Show Sha and various other shows.

== Works ==
Maqsood is often regarded as one of the leading Pakistani satirists/writers, as well as highly respected in the social and showbiz industry of Pakistan. Anwar Maqsood is often given credit for encouraging talented television actors like Bushra Ansari and Moin Akhter. He wrote various successful plays for the television industry, including:

Network	Name	Genre	Type	Year
Pakistan Television Corporation	Aik Sachi Chuk	Comedy	Long play	
Pakistan Television Corporation	Aik Thi Safia		Long play	
Pakistan Television Corporation	Amma		Long play	
Pakistan Television Corporation	Aangan Terha	Comedy	Drama serial	
Pakistan Television Corporation	Chun Chunao	Comedy	Drama serial	
Pakistan Television Corporation	Dour-e-Junoon (Drama 83)		Long play	
Pakistan Television Corporation	Fifty Fifty	Comedy	Sketch comedy	
Pakistan Television Corporation	Fanooni Latifey	Comedy	Long play	
Pakistan Television Corporation	Half Plate	Comedy	Long play	
Pakistan Television Corporation	Iss Tarah To Hota Hai	Comedy	Drama serial	
Pakistan Television Corporation	Karim Sahab Ka Ghar (Sachi Kahaniyan)	Comedy	Long play	
Pakistan Television Corporation	Nasri Ganey	Comedy	Long play	
Pakistan Television Corporation	Show Time	Comedy	Stage show	
Pakistan Television Corporation	Show Sha	Comedy	Stage show	
Pakistan Television Corporation	Silver Jubilee		Stage show	
Pakistan Television Corporation	Studio Dhaai		Stage show	
Pakistan Television Corporation	Studio Ponay Teen	Comedy	Stage show	1993
Pakistan Television Corporation	Talaash		Drama serial	
Pakistan Television Corporation	Zia Mohi-ud-Din Show	Comedy	Stage show	1969–1973
Pakistan Television Corporation	Yeh Kahan Ki Dosti Hai		Long play	1988
Network Television Marketing	Studio Chaar Bees	Comedy		
Network Television Marketing	Sitara Aur Mehrunissa	Romance	Drama serial	
Network Television Marketing	Nadan Nadia	Comedy	Drama serial	
Network Television Marketing	Colony 52		Drama serial	
ARY Digital Network	Loose Talk	Comedy	Talk show	
ARY Digital Network	Aik Naya Mashaira	Comedy	Telefilm	
ARY Digital Network	Majoo Mian			
Express Entertainment	Hum Pe Jo Guzarti Hai			
Other	Pawnay 14 August	Satire	One-act play	2012
Other	Sawa 14 August	Satire	One-act play	2013
Other	Anwar Maqsood ka Dharna	Satire	Play	2014
Other	Siachen	Satire	Play	2015
Other	Saadhay 14 August	Satire	Play	2022

He also wrote the lyrics of Nestlé Nido Young Stars theme, "Meri Pyari Ammi Jaan" (میری پیاری امی جان; English: My Dear Mother).

== Awards ==
- Pride of Performance Award by the Government of Pakistan in 1994
- Hilal-e-Imtiaz (Crescent of Excellence) Award by the President of Pakistan in 2013
- PTV Superstar award at PTV Awards in 2000
- Lifetime Achievement Honour at 4th Pakistan Media Awards
- Lifetime Achievement Award at the 3rd Hum Awards

== See also ==
- List of Urdu authors
- List of Urdu novelists
- List of Pakistani male actors
