= Pakistani popular music =

Genre

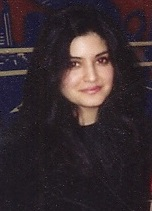
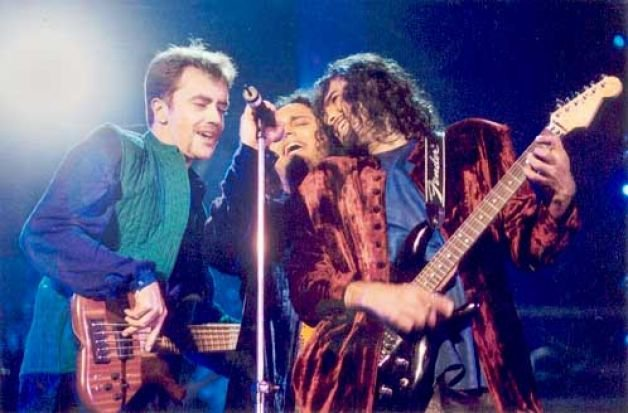
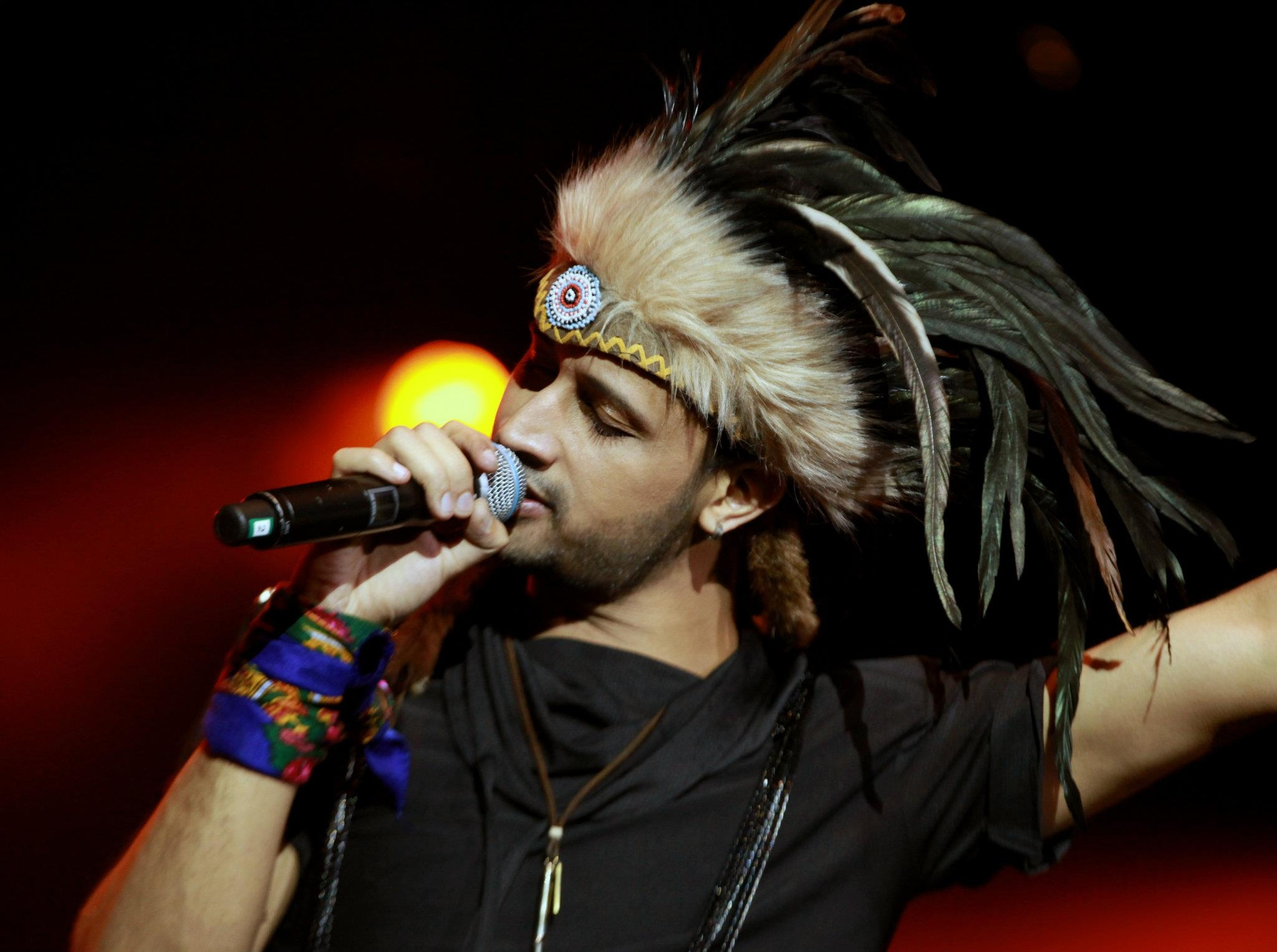
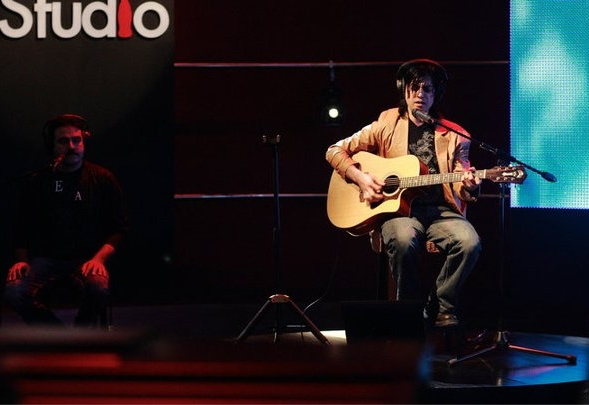
- Top left: Nazia Hassan in 1994; Top right: Junoon performing live at Channel V Awards; Bottom left: Atif Aslam performing at O2 Arena in 2012; Bottom right: Mizraab performing live at Coke Studio Pakistan (season 4) in 2011.
- Stylistic origins: Classical (semi-classical); Folk; Ghazal; Qawwali; Sufi; Western pop; rock
- Cultural origins: Late 1960s–1980s; Pakistan

Subgenres
- Pakistani rock (Sufi rock); Pakistani hip hop

Other topics
- Music of Pakistan; Music of South Asia; Filmi pop; Indian pop

Pakistani popular music or shortly Pak-pop music refers to popular music forms in Pakistan. Pakistani pop is a mixture of traditional Pakistani classical music and western influences of jazz, rock and roll, hip hop and disco sung in various languages of Pakistan, including Urdu. The popularity of music is based on the individual sales of a single, viewership of its music video or the singer's album chart positions. Apart from within Pakistan, Pakistani pop music has also achieved an influential following and popularity in neighboring countries and is listened by members of the Pakistani diaspora, especially in the Middle East, Europe and North America.

Pakistani pop music is attributed to have given birth to the genre in the South Asian region with Ahmed Rushdi's song "Ko Ko Korina" in 1966. Pakistani pop is thus closely related to Indian pop music, as well as Bollywood music and Bangladeshi rock. Subgenres of Pakistani pop music include Qawwali (a form of Sufi music), Pakistani rock (including Sufi rock), Pakistani hip hop, and disco (related to Bollywood disco).

Veterans like Runa Laila and Alamgir started the pop industry in Pakistan while the fifteen-years old pop sensation Nazia with her brother Zohaib Hassan ushered the birth of pop music all over South Asia tailing on the success of her British endeavours. The Qawwali singer Nusrat Fateh Ali Khan was also a prominent influence on Pakistani pop music.

From Rushdi's pop hits to songs sung by the Hassan siblings, to bands including Junoon, Vital Signs, Jal and Strings, the Pakistani pop industry has steadily spread throughout South Asia and today is the most popular genre in Pakistan and the neighbouring South Asian countries. Songs sung by Pakistani pop artists are a regular feature on soundtracks of most of the Bollywood movies.

The genre has always been accepted in the mainstream youth culture but hindrances came in the form of changing governments, cultural conservatism, foreign influences and a stiff competition from neighbouring countries. Still, pop music thrived and survived with a steady growth. It was not until recent times that Pakistani pop music was to be admired throughout South Asia and the rest of the world.

== History ==
=== 1960–1980: Rise and fall of playback singing ===
After the independence of Pakistan in 1947, the most popular form of entertainment in the newly created Pakistan was the medium of film. Cinemas sprouted up in various corners of the nation, especially in Lahore, Karachi and Dacca in East Pakistan and playback singing became popular. People that tended to move into the genre had to be trained in classical music, usually trained by ustads who mastered its various forms and styles. In 1966, a talented young playback singer Ahmed Rushdi (now considered as one of the greatest singers of South Asia) sang the first South Asian pop song "Ko-Ko-Korina" for the film Armaan. Composed by Sohail Rana, the song was a blend of 60s bubblegum pop, rock and roll twist music and Pakistani film music. This genre would later be termed as ‘filmi pop’. Paired with Runa Laila, the singer is considered the pioneering father of pop music, mostly hip hop and disco, in South Asia.

Following Rushdi's success, Christian bands specialising in jazz started performing at various night clubs and hotel lobbies in Karachi, Hyderabad and Lahore. They would usually sing either famous American jazz hits or cover Rushdi's songs. Rushdi sang playback hits along with Laila until the Bangladesh Liberation War when East Pakistan was declared an independent state. Laila, being a Bengali, decided to leave for the new-found Bangladesh.

The 1980s saw a nose-dive in the progress of cinema in Pakistan as the nation was left in a state of turmoil over the changes in the government administration. The number of cinemas decreased rapidly and people preferred watching television over going to a cinema.

==== New era and revival: (1972–1978) ====
While the cinema in Pakistan was declining, neighboring India was gaining in strength in film content and quality. People began admiring the Indian playback counterparts. And when it seemed that music in Pakistan had no hopes of surviving this foreign influence, Anwar Maqsood and Shoaib Mansoor launched the career of Nerissa, Beena and Shabana Benjamin (collectively known as the Benjamin Sisters) in 1985. The sisters became popular on television shows, and they became known by tabloids as the Benjamin Sisters Phenomenon.

A few years later came Bengali singer Alamgir. Alamgir sang Albela Rahi, an Urdu song literally translated from a famous Cuban hit originally in Spanish. Alamgir brought a new form of music to Pakistan, one that blended the classical forms with a tint of modern Western music. Alongside Alamgir, Muhammad Ali Shehki also rose to fame with his renditions of the Hindustani classical forms with mediums like jazz and rock.

Hassan Jahangir gained fame in the '80s with hit singles such as "Hawa Hawa", "Hato Bacho", and "Shadi Na Karna Yaron". He released his first single "Imran Khan is a Superman" in 1982 and went on to release his one and only internationally famous album Hawa Hawa. It sold approximately 15 million copies in India.

=== New wave of music and New genres (1980–2000s) ===
In 1980, Nazia Hassan, a fifteen-years-old Pakistani girl residing in the United Kingdom was approached by Indian actor and director Feroz Khan along with Biddu Appaiah, an Indian music producer who asked her to sing the song "Aap Jaisa Koi" for the film Qurbani. She was selected for the nasal quality of the song's delivery. The song became an instant hit in the UK and the Indian sub-continent. Influenced primarily by disco beats and hip hop, Nazia along with her brother Zohaib Hassan produced successive hits. Their songs Disco Deewane and Tere Qadmon Ko became the rage all over Asia to the extent that their very first album was declared the best selling album of the time in Asia.

The hype did not last for long as with Muhammad Zia-ul-Haq's regime came drastic decisions to Islamicise the nation. Almost all music videos were banned to air on local television. The religious leaders found the two Hassan siblings dancing together on the stage most un-Islamic. When shown the videos would feature Nazia waist-up to hide her dancing feet. Hence, this came as another blow to the music industry.

==== Rock music and Zia years (1980–1989) ====
Despite Zia's tough rhetoric against the Western music, the 1980s era is the widely regarded times of birth and rise of Pakistan's homegrown and ingenious rock music. Immediately following the military installation of Muhammad Zia-ul-Haq as president, measures were taken to put in place to limit the distribution of music and the only source of entertainment was the government-owned television network Pakistan Television Corporation (PTV). A state of the union speech to the public in 1979, President Zia denounced the Western culture and Western music and banned all the music videos in the country.

Despite the hardship and problems faced by the music industry, the siblings, Nazia and her younger brother Zohaib Hassan, teamed up to produce more pop albums, but in the turmoil that Pakistan was headed through, the duo lost viewership and sales in their own country. They managed to reach UK Top 40 with the English version of their song "Disco Deewane" titled "Dreamer Deewane". The album sold over 14 million records, not only in Asia but as far as South America, South Africa and Soviet Union. Nazia Zoheb later produced many other albums in the 1980s e.g., Boom Boom (1982), Young Tarang (1984), Hotline (1987), and Camera Camera (1992) and completely dominated the Pop music scene of Asia during the 1980s.

A new rage of Pop/ rock music, began to rise during the regime of President Zia-ul-Haq. Throughout the 1980s, there was a popular wave of cultural change and the 80's fashion hair styles and clothing was beginning to be noticed by the public. The homegrown rock music bands, out of ordinary to the culture, came to be perceived by many Pakistani fans and country's cultural observers as a "promising new era of cultural revival". Their enormous popularity significantly opened a new wave of music and a modern chapter in the history of Pakistan. The public generally welcomed the new hair styles and fashion wear (popular among university female and male students).

During the peak and end times of Zia's conservative regime, there was a popular wave of cultural change, and the Western fashion style and music stormed the country. In the 1980s, various music arrangers held underground rock music concerts in the five-star hotels and university campuses. Ironically, it was the conservative regime of President Zia-ul-Haq when the rock music exploded and underground rock music concerts were held all over the country, including Islamabad and near the residence of Zia-ul-Haq. In 1986, the pop band, Vital Signs, released its very first singles Dil Dil Pakistan and, Do Pal Ka Jeevan, which became an ultimate success in the country.

The success of Vital Signs helped others to follow their suit, and the rock music in the country skyrocketed for the first time in the history of the country. In a time when there was no hope for the industry to survive, rock/pop music bands notably and much quickly filled the gap that the pop music industry had left. According to the Western observers and cultural critics, the rock music bands in the country brought the significant shift of country's transformation into modernism during the 1990s. With the rise of Vital Signs and later, Junoon and others, the rock music, exploded in the 1980s and 1990s, became a vehicle for expressing patriotic nationalist spirit in Pakistan.

In 1990, the first privately owned television station, the Network Television Marketing (NTM) opened up introducing shows aimed at the younger generation. Prior to that, in 1989, Shoaib Mansoor produced a show for PTV called Music '89 and took the Hassan siblings as the show's host. This show is responsible for single-handedly creating legends out of bands like Vital Signs, Junoon, Ali Haider, Sajjad Ali and Jupiters also including underground alternative rock bands like Final Cut and The Barbarians. According to the editorial written in The Express Tribune in 2011, the "Vital Signs and Pakistan's ingenious rock music was the only "arsenal" the country had against India's encroaching entertainment industry." It was during the midst of Zia times, when Dil Dil Pakistan was released on television and on a short time period, it became a huge success in the country.

=== The heyday of Pakistan pop music (1990–onwards): emergence of bands and popular singers ===
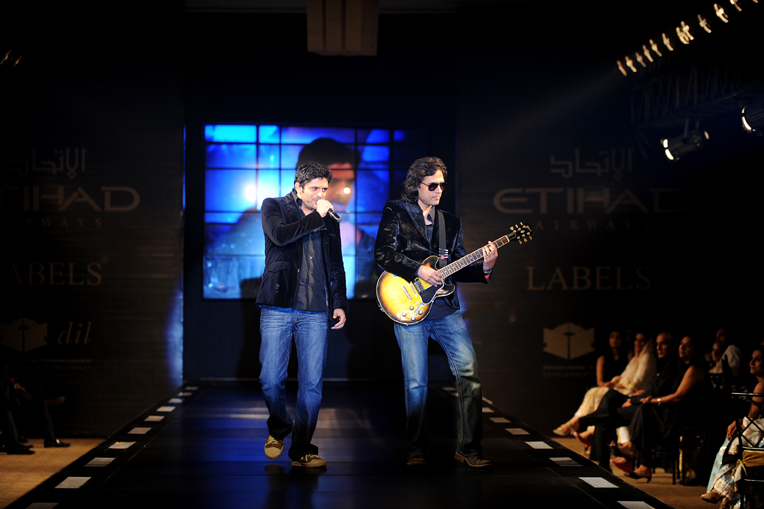
In the 1990s, the Strings gained a lot of publicity for their rock/pop music genre.

With the success of Vital Signs and other bands, pop/rock music significantly helped to list pop music as well. The primetime reception on NTM in Lahore, Karachi and Islamabad as NTM broadcast a show titled Music Channel Charts. The rock music continued to be appreciated by the public and an hour-length show that showcased music videos for various artists in a countdown format. When people started getting acquainted with the show's format, amateur bands and singers taped their own videos and sent them to be aired. With competition rising and only a few minutes dedicated to a single video, pop and rock musicians from all over the country were being recognised for their work.

The show made upcoming artists such as rapper Fakhre Alam, Danish Rahi, Fringe Benefit (the debut album Tanhai was recorded and mixed by Tahir Gul Hasan at his recording studios in Karachi), Strings, Junoon, Aamir Saleem, Aamir Zaki, and Haroon Rashid and Faakhir Mehmood from Awaz household names. The show became the trailblazer and many followed its footstep. Video Countdown (which later became Video Count Down Zabardast Zabar Duss/10) started on PTV and Video Junction (VJ) was one of its kind on NTM which started after the closure of MCC. As PTV became international in 1992 with the launch of PTV2, it opened the international arena for Pakistani Pop artists. More and More International TV channels (especially from across the borders) became visible in Pakistan through satellite. Pakistani artists started making their ways to MTV India and Channel V in the late 1990s. and overshadow every effort the Pakistani counterpart would make to highlight the talents within.

The beginning of FM radio in the mid-90s made Pakistani pop more available. People started enjoying the shades of Paki Pop n rock in their cars.

Recording companies like EMI Pakistan, Pepsi Pakistan Inc. and Sound Master started taking note of the new and rising stars. They started signing contracts with bands including Strings, Vital Signs, Junoon, Benjamin Sister, and Awaz who would later become iconic pop-rock bands. At this time, various rock/pop bands earned a lot of recognition abroad after Vital Signs made its debut international concert in the United States in 1993.

Abrar-ul-Haq, since his debut with Billo De Ghar (1995), became known as the "King of Pakistani pop and bhangra", having sold over 40.3 million albums worldwide.

Hadiqa Kiani made her debut in Adnan Sami & Zeba Bakhtiar starrer "Sargam" in 1995 which became a phenomenal hit and the music album of the movie was a chartbuster in Lollywood Top 10 (PTV), Yeh Hai Filmi Dunya (NTM) and FM channels. But Hadiqa continued her music career more as a pop artist instead of a playback. Her albums "Raaz, Rung and Roshni" sold millions and made her an ultimate female pop star after Nazia Hassan. In 1997, Hadiqa became the second international female singer in the world to be signed by Pepsi.

Following the Kargil War, all Indian channel broadcasts were limited or banned in Pakistan and after Pervaiz Musharraf's coup d'état, the media was privatised. To cater to the needs of thousands who watched the Indian channels with regularity, programmes were broadcast to match the Indian content. Seeing this as an opportunity, bands returned on the music scene and started producing videos with much richer content. In 2002–03, Ghazanfar Ali, producer and CEO of the Indus Media Group started his very first venture into the music industry with Indus Music, a channel dedicated to music following the formats used by Western Music Channels. The channel started as a part of the Indus Vision channel and was later started as a separate channel in 2003. With nothing much to watch than a few Pakistani channels, the youngsters in the country would settle in for Indus Music and would become interested in music once again. In 2006 Indus TV Network in an agreement with MTV Intn;l converted Indus Music into MTV Pakistan which continued till 2011 to again become Indus Music.

Rock music continued to gather popularity in the country, as more singers and bands entered the genre. But the law and order situation in Pakistan had limited the number of concerts, and artists were not heavily promoting their albums. New musical talent emerged in Pakistan in the decade of 2000. Entity Paradigm, Aaroh, Mizraab, Mizmaar, Fuzon, Raeth, Noori, Mechal Hassan Band, Jal, Roxen, etc. made their name by producing quality music. By the early 2000s, a fresh wave of solo pop acts also emerged, including Ali Zafar, Atif Aslam, Shiraz Uppal, Annie Khalid etc. With the disbanding of Junoon, Ali Azmat launched his solo career, and his first solo album Social Circus became a success and received widespread acclaim. After Indus Music, ARY Musik (The Musik), Aag (now off-air), Play, and many other music channels were launched which kept the music scene going on.

The band Jal initially formed by Atif Aslam and Goher Mumtaz brought in a new wave of Pakistani pop music scene during early 2000s with hits like Aadat and Woh Lamhe.

Moreover, the new wave of cinema in Pakistan supported the pop/rock music scene, as most of the background scores and OSTs of new movies and dramas are generally produced by pop/rock artists.

From 2021 onwards, the landscape of Pakistani pop music altered significantly with the arrival of digital streaming and short-form video platforms. The launch of platforms like Spotify in Pakistan, alongside the rise of Instagram Reels and TikTok, changed how music is discovered and distributed. These platforms allowed the independent (indie) music scene to expand rapidly, enabling indie artists to achieve mainstream success without traditional record label backing.

== Television shows ==
=== Coke Studio ===
Coke Studio, a popular Pakistani music television series, became Pakistan's first official venture into the collaboration of Pakistani pop music artists, with 14 successful seasons from 2008 up till now. The first 7 seasons were produced by Rohail Hyatt, a member of the veteran former Pop band of Pakistan Vital Signs. It fuses multiple musical influences, and is telecast on all TV channels and some radio channels of Pakistan, making it available for everyone at home and abroad. The platform brought forth the talents of folk and modern artists such as Arif Lohar and Meesha Shafi. The season 8 Coke Studio was highly popular, with many of its songs topping the charts of most online music streaming websites popular in South Asia such as Taazi, SoundCloud and Patari.pk.

Following its success in Pakistan after its first launch, Coke Studio has become an international franchise. The Pakistani show has amassed a large fan following in neighboring India. The success of the show prompted Coca-Cola to launch the Indian version Coke Studio @ MTV, with a similar format, which has proven to be both critically acclaimed and commercially successful. The Indian version has been produced by MTV India. In April 2012, an Arab version of the show, Coke Studio بالعربي was launched in the Middle East featuring performances by various Arabic and international music artists, produced by the songwriter Michel Elefteriades.

=== Pakistan Idol ===
The Idol franchise was launched in Pakistan in 2013 with the Pakistan Idol series, which was telecast by Geo TV. The anthem for the show was Awaaz Mein Teri, composed and sang by Ali Zafar. The show was judged by Bushra Ansari, Ali Azmat, and Hadiqa Kiani. The winner of the first season was Zamad Baig.

=== Pepsi Battle of the Bands ===
Pepsi Battle of the Bands is television show based on the concept of Battle of the Bands, first aired in 2002 on PTV Home. The show was revived in 2017. This season featured judges Atif Aslam, Meesha Shafi and Fawad Khan who performed Vital Signs' "Do Pal Ka Jeevan" and Alamgir's "Dekha Na Tha" as a tribute;

Rohail Hyatt (S1)

Fifi Haroon (S1) Shahi Hasan (S1, 2) Fawad Khan (S2, 3, 4) Meesha Shafi (S2, 3, 4) Atif Aslam (S2) Farooq Ahmed (S2, S3) Strings (S3)

=== Acoustic Station ===
Kashan Admani released Pakistan's first music web series, Acoustic Station in 2019. The series was based on unplugged music and featured popular musicians in the likes of Natasha Baig, Kashmir (Pakistani band), Kami Paul, Natasha Khan (Pakistani singer), Shallum Asher Xavier, and more.

== Bollywood ==
The Pakistani Qawwali musician Nusrat Fateh Ali Khan had a big impact on Bollywood music, inspiring numerous Indian musicians working in Bollywood, especially during the 1990s. However, there were many instances of Indian music directors plagiarising Khan's music to produce hit filmi songs. Viju Shah's hit song "Tu Cheez Badi Hai Mast Mast" in Mohra (1994) was plagiarised from Khan's popular Qawwali song "Dam Mast Qalandar". Pop/rock artists like Atif Aslam, Rahat Fateh Ali Khan, Ali Zafar, Shafqat Amanat Ali, Mustafa Zahid etc. are equally popular in India in Bollywood music industry.

== Lists ==
=== Best-selling artists ===
Rank	Artist(s)	Sales	Years	Ref
1	Nazia Hassan and Zoheb Hassan	60,000,000	1980–1992	
2	Abrar-ul-Haq	40,300,000	1995–2004	
3	Junoon	30,000,000	1990–2010	
4	Strings	25,000,000	1988–2021	
5	Nusrat Fateh Ali Khan	19,650,000	1996–2007	(Note: See Nusrat Fateh Ali Khan discography § Sales.)
6	Atif Aslam	11,000,000	2004–2008	(Note: Includes sales from his debut solo album Jal Pari and contributions during his tenure with the band Jal.)

=== Best-selling albums ===
Rank	Year	Album	Artist(s)	Sales	Ref
1	1995	Billo De Ghar	Abrar-ul-Haq	16,000,000	
2	1987	Hawa Hawa	Hassan Jahangir	15,000,000	
3	1981	Disco Deewane	Nazia Hassan and Zoheb Hassan	14,000,000	
4	1997	Only One	Nusrat Fateh Ali Khan and Mahmood Khan	6,000,000	
5	2003	Huqa Pani	Ali Zafar	5,000,000	
5	2004	Jal Pari	Atif Aslam	5,000,000	
7	1997	Vande Mataram	A. R. Rahman and Nusrat Fateh Ali Khan	2,000,000	
7	2006	Doorie	Atif Aslam	2,000,000	
9	1989	Vital Signs 1	Vital Signs	1,000,000	
9	1996	Sangam	Nusrat Fateh Ali Khan and Javed Akhtar	1,000,000	
9	1997	Azadi	Junoon	1,000,000	
9	1998	Roshni	Hadiqa Kiani	1,000,000	

=== Music video streams ===
The following are the most-viewed Pakistani music videos on YouTube:

Year	Song	Artist(s)	YouTube streams	Ref.
2014	Zaroori Tha	Rahat Fateh Ali Khan	1.7 Billion	
2013	Satisfya	Imran Khan	1 Billion	
2009	Amplifier	Imran Khan	1 Billion	
2022	Pasoori	Ali Sethi, Shae Gill	1 Billion	
2016	Mere Rashk-e-Qamar (Remix)	Junaid Asghar	909 Million	
2022	Kahani Suno 2.0	Kaifi Khalil	765 Million	
2025	Pal Pal	Afusic	740 Million	
2016	Afreen Afreen	Rahat Fateh Ali Khan, Momina Mustehsan	700 Million	
2015	Tajdar-e-Haram	Atif Aslam	671 Million	
2024	Jhol	Annural Khalid, Maanu	658 Mliion	
2017	Pehli Dafa (Note: While the music video for "Pehli Dafa" was released by the Indian record label T-Series and featured Indian actress Ileana D'Cruz, the core creative team behind the track was Pakistani, including lyricist Shakeel Sohail and composer Shiraz Uppal.)	Atif Aslam	505 Million	
2023	Tu Hai Kahan	AUR	493 Million	
2021	Khuda Aur Muhabbat (OST)	Rahat Fateh Ali Khan, Nish Asher	478 Million	
2019	Ali Mola Ali Dam Dam (Remix)	Sultan Ul QADRIA Qawwa	402 Million	
2016	Tu Kuja Man Kuja	Shirraz Uppal, Rafaqat Ali Khan	317 Million	
2019	Pakistan Zindabad	Sahir Ali Bagga	315 Million	
2009	Pata Chalega	Imran Khan	302 Million	
2023	Ishq Murshid (OST)	Ahmed Jahanzeb	286 Million	
2023	Ranjheya Ve	Zain Zohaib	285 Million	
2018	Jo Tu Na Mila	Asim Azhar	277 Million	
As of 13 November 2026

=== Album streams ===
The following were the top ten most-streamed Pakistani music albums on Spotify as of 2025.

Rank	Year	Album	Artist(s)
1	2024	Safar	Bayaan
2	2024	My Terrible Mind	Talha Anjum, Umair
3	2024	ROCKSTAR WITHOUT A GUITAR	Umair
4	2023	Open Letter	Talha Anjum, Umair
5	2009	Unforgettable	Imran Khan
6	2010	Gunkali	Kaavish
7	2025	Dil Ke Parde	Hasan Raheem
8	2011	Bol (soundtrack)	Atif Aslam, Sajjad Ali
9	2025	thikaana	Maanu
10	2024	Superstar	Bilal Saeed

=== List of notable pop artists and rock bands by decade ===
==== 1960s ====
- Ahmed Rushdi
- Runa Laila

==== 1970s ====
- Alamgir
- Muhammad Ali Shahki
- Benjamin Sisters

==== 1980s ====
- Nazia Hassan
- Zohaib Hassan
- Hassan Jahangir
- Jupiters
- Tehseen Javed
- Vital Signs (band)
- Rohail Hayat
- Junaid Jamshed
- Nusrat Hussain

==== 1990s ====
- Ali Haider
- Sajjad Ali
- Waqar Ali
- Aamir Zaki
- Aamir Saleem
- Fakhr-e-Alam
- Awaz
- Haroon
- Faakhir Mehmood
- Yasir Akhtar (The Arid Zone)
- The Milestones
- Junoon (band)
- Salman Ahmad
- Ali Azmat
- Hadiqa Kiyani
- Strings (band)
- Jawad Bashir (Dr. Aur Billa)
- Fariha Pervez
- Komal Rizvi
- Shahzad Roy
- Najam Shiraz
- Abrar-ul-Haq
- Waris Baig
- Rahim Shah
- Karavan
- Mizraab

==== 2000s ====
- Jawad Ahmad
- Entity Paradigm
- Zulfiqar Jabbar Khan
- Noori
- Aaroh
- Mekaal Hasan Band
- Javed Bashir
- Mizmaar
- Fuzön
- Shafqat Amanat Ali
- Ahmed Jahanzeb
- Ali Zafar
- Atif Aslam
- Jal (band)
- Goher Mumtaz
- Farhan Saeed
- Mustafa Zahid (Roxen (band))
- Call (band)
- Overload (Pakistani band)
- Humaira Arshad
- Shiraz Uppal
- Annie Khalid
- Qurram Hussain (Josh (band))
- Ali Khan
- Sajid & Zeeshan
- Malkoo
- Zeb Bangash (Zeb and Haniya)
- Imran Khan
- Kaavish (Jaffer Zaidi)
- Laal (band)
- Rahat Fateh Ali Khan

==== 2010s ====
- Aag (band)
- The Sketches
- E Sharp (band)
- Ali Aftab Saeed (Beygairat Brigade)
- Shuja Haider
- Amanat Ali
- Qayaas
- Umair Jaswal
- Uzair Jaswal
- Bilal Khan
- Sahir Ali Bagga
- Meesha Shafi
- Zoe Viccaji
- Naseer & Shahab
- Leo Twins
- Soch (band)
- Bilal Saeed
- Quratulain Balouch
- Asrar
- Kashmir (Pakistani band)
- Nabeel Shaukat Ali
- Justin Bibis
- Yasir Jaswal
- Shani Arshad
- Jabar Abbas
- Momina Mustehsan
- Irteassh
- Mooroo
- Abdullah Qureshi
- Quaid Ahmed
- Natasha Baig
- Natasha Noorani (Biryani Brothers)
- Arooj Aftab
- Nirmal Roy
- Kashif Ali
- Haroon Shahid
- Sara Haider
- Ali Sethi
- Bayaan (band)
- Asim Azhar
- Aima Baig
- Damia Farooq
- Rizwan Butt
- Badnaam (band)
- Abdullah Siddiqui
- Shamoon Ismail
- Talal Qureshi
- Sadaat Shafqat Amanat

==== 2020s ====
- Azaan Sami Khan
- Hasan Raheem
- Annural Khalid
- Danyal Zafar
- Shae Gill
- Kaifi Khalil
- Karakoram (band)
- Samar Jafri
- Afusic

== See also ==
- Pakistani rock
- Music of Pakistan
- Indian pop
- Pop music
- List of Pakistani pop singers
