= List of Pakistani pop singers =

Pakistani singers and bands became popular during the early nineties, with pop, rock and Ghazal becoming more fashionable with the younger generations. This article contains a list of notable singers who are based in Pakistan. This list includes singers who in many genres including pop, rock, jazz, traditional, classical, Ghazals styles or folk music. Following are the most popular Pakistani pop singers of all times.

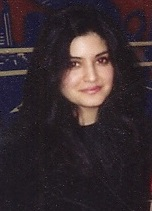
Nazia Hassan

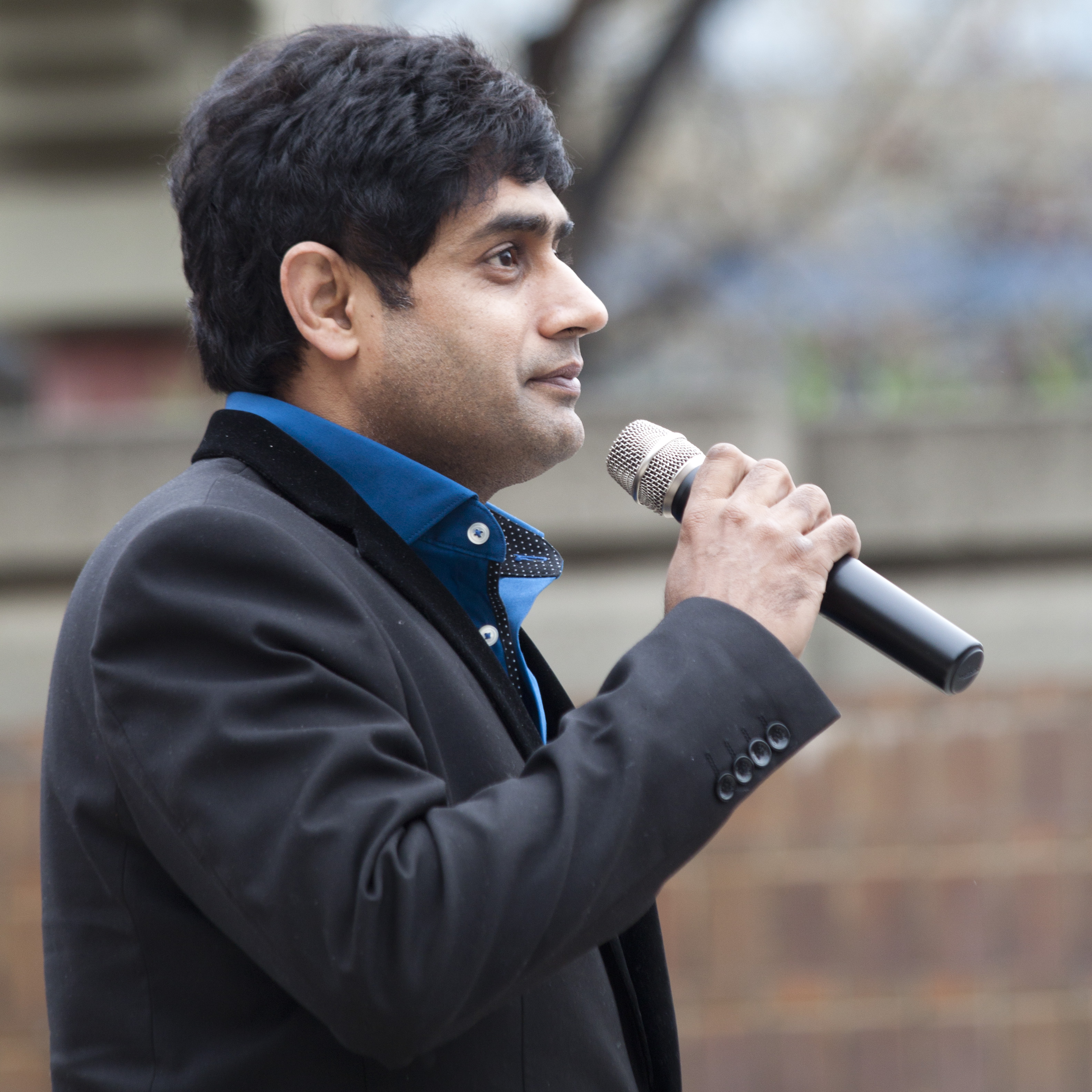
Abrar-ul-Haq

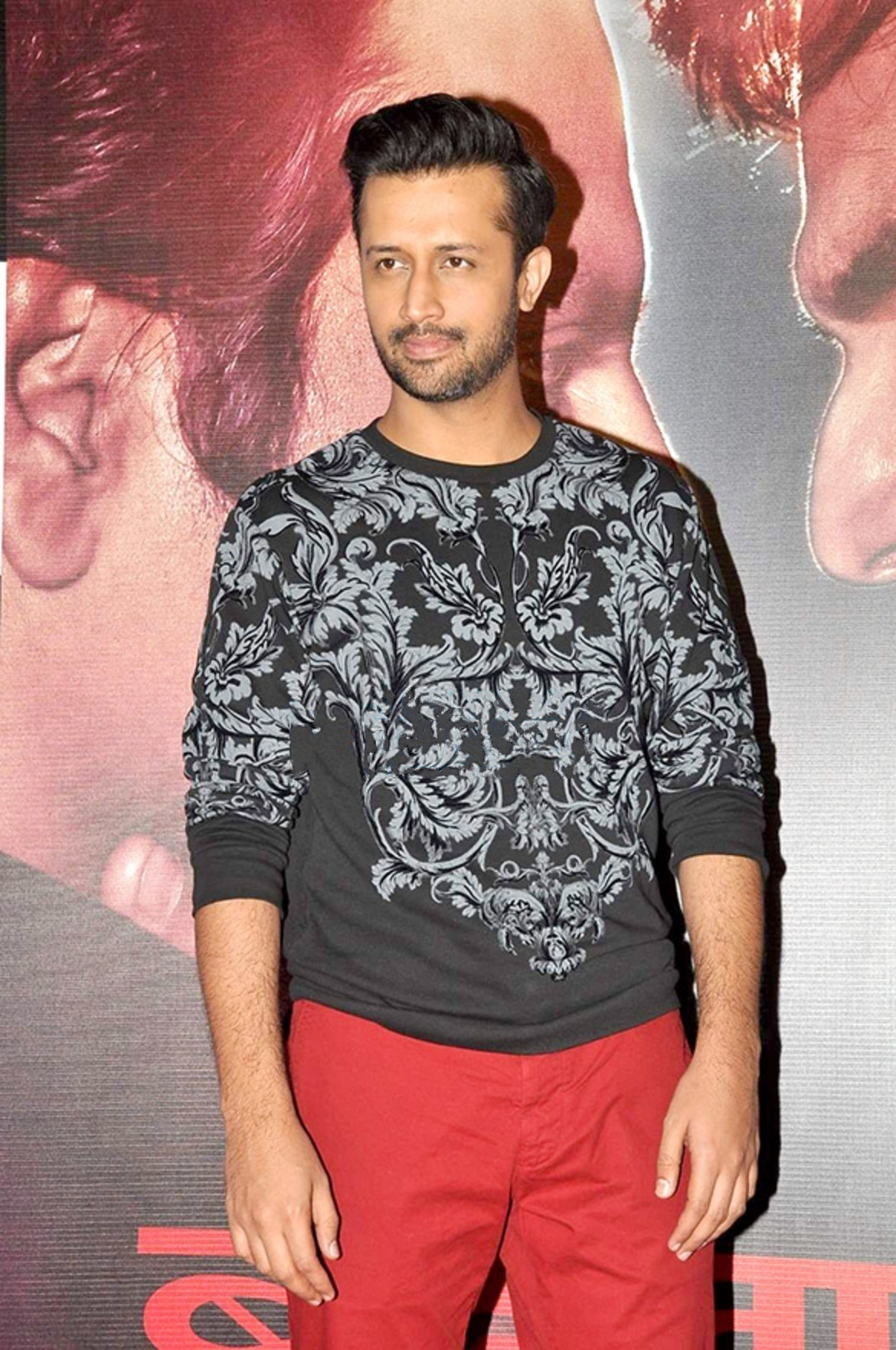
Atif Aslam

For more pop singers by their letter specifications you can find it below.

== A ==
- Aamir Saleem
- Abrar-ul-Haq
- Ahmed Jahanzeb
- Alamgir
- Ali Azmat
- Ali Haider
- Ali Khan
- Ali Zafar
- Amir Jamal
- Aamir Zaki
- Annie Khalid
- Arshad Mahmood
- Arshad Mehmood
- Atif Aslam
- Ahmed Rushdi
- Amanat Ali
- Asad Ahmed
- Asim Azhar
- Aima Baig

== B ==
- Bilal Saeed
- Benjamin Sisters
- Bilal Maqsood
- Bilal Khan

== D ==
- Damia Farooq

== F ==
- Faakhir Mehmood
- Fakhre Alam
- Farhan Saeed
- Faraz Anwar
- Faisal Kapadia
- Fariha Pervez

== G ==
- Goher Mumtaz

== H ==
- Haroon Rashid
- Hasan Jahangir
- Humaira Arshad
- Hadiqa Kiani

== K ==
- Kashif Ali

== I ==
- Imran Khan
- Imran Muhammad Akhoond

== J ==
- Jawad Ahmed
- Junaid Jamshaid
- Jabbar Abbas
- Jawad Bashir
- Junaid Khan

== M ==
- Mohammed Ali Shehki
- Mustafa Zahid
- Momina Mustehsan

== N ==
- Najam Sheraz
- Nazia Hassan
- Nazia Iqbal
- Nadia Ali
- Nusrat Hussain
- Nabeel Shaukat Ali

== Q ==
- Quratulain Balouch

== R ==
- Rabi Pirzada
- Raheem Shah
- Rahat Fateh Ali Khan
- Rizwan Butt

== S ==
- Shafqat Amanat Ali
- Sajjad Ali
- Shafqat Ali Khan
- Shehzad Roy
- Shiraz Uppal
- Sanam Marvi
- Salman Ahmad
- Sahir Ali Bagga
- Shani Arshad
- Sara Haider

== U ==
- Umair Jaswal
- Uzair Jaswal

== W ==
- Waqar Ali
- Waris Baig

== Z ==
- Zoheb Hassan
- Zoe Viccaji

== See also ==
- Music of South Asia
- Music of Pakistan
- Culture of Pakistan
- History of Pakistani pop music
- List of Pakistani musicians
- List of songs about Pakistan
- List of Pakistani music bands
- Sufi rock
- Filmi pop
- National Academy of Performing Arts
