= Mizraab discography =

- Mizraab performing live at V-Sel Outlet in Karachi, in 2011. Visible from left to right are; Ferdinand Goveas, Irfan Ahmed (back), Faraz Anwar and Muhammad Muzammil.
- Studio albums: 2
- Live albums: 4
- Singles: 13
- Music videos: 9

The discography of Mizraab, a Pakistani progressive rock band, consists of two studio albums, as well as numerous live albums, singles and music videos. The band was formed by lead guitarist and vocalist Faraz Anwar, bassist Khalid Khan and percussionist Akhtar Qayyum in 1996. After the release of the band's first studio album, there had been many changes in the line-up the only consistent member being Faraz himself.

Although Mizraab has been prominent in their home country since the release of their debut album Panchi (1999), they did not achieve fame and commercial success until the release of their second studio album Maazi, Haal, Mustaqbil, which was released in 2004. The album sold over 30,000 copies upon it release and is the band's highest selling album. Singles from the album like "Kitni Sadian" and "Insaan" became an instant hit in Pakistan and did very well at the local music charts. The band produced an overall of five singles along with five music videos for each single from the album, the other singles from the album are "Panchi", "Meri Terhan" and "Izhar". The album is also credited to be the first proper Urdu metal album released in Pakistan.

After the release of their second studio album, Mizraab made a comeback into the lime light with the video for "Ujalon Main" in December 2006, which showcased the new band members as well as the change in genre and was well received all over the country. Mizraab’s third album was completed in late 2006–2007 but due to the dire state of the music industry in Pakistan, no deal could be reached and the album was shelved.

== Albums ==
=== Studio albums ===
| Year | Album information |
|---|---|
| 1999 | Panchi: Released: April, 1999; Recorded: 1998–1999 in Karachi, Pakistan; Label: Sadaf Stereo; Producer: Faraz Anwar |
| 2004 | Maazi, Haal, Mustaqbil: Released: March 8, 2004; Singles: "Insaan", "Meri Terhan", "Izhar", "Kitni Sadian", "Panchi"; Recorded: 2003–2004 at 8-93 in Karachi, Pakistan; Label: Sadaf Stereo; Producer: Faraz Anwar |

=== Live albums ===
| Year | Album information |
|---|---|
| 2009 | Live at FM 101: Released: June 2, 2009; Recorded: October 22, 2004 at FM 101 Studios in Karachi, Pakistan; Label: Independent; Producer: Faraz Anwar, Sharaf Qaisar |
| 2010 | Mizraab - Live & Rare: Released: January 1, 2010; Recorded: August 11, 2007 at MTV Studios in Karachi, Pakistan; Label: Independent; Producer: Faraz Anwar |
| 2012 | Unplugged: Released: January 21, 2012; Recorded: April 1, 2011 at V-Sel Outlet for MTV Pakistan in Karachi, Pakistan; Label: Independent; Producer: Faraz Anwar |
| 2013 | Aag Alive: Released: February 1, 2013; Recorded: 2007 at Aag TV Studios in Karachi, Pakistan; Label: Independent; Producer: Faraz Anwar |

== Singles ==
| Year | Song | Album |
|---|---|---|
| 2002 | Insaan | Maazi, Haal, Mustaqbil |
| 2002 | Meri Terhan | Maazi, Haal, Mustaqbil |
| 2003 | Izhar | Maazi, Haal, Mustaqbil |
| 2004 | Kitni Sadian | Maazi, Haal, Mustaqbil |
| 2004 | Dil Dil Pakistan | Tribute to Vital Signs |
| 2004 | Sari Shamain | Released as a single |
| 2005 | Panchi | Maazi, Haal, Mustaqbil |
| 2005 | Sham-o-Seher | Released as a single |
| 2005 | Meré Khuda | Released as a single |
| 2006 | Ujalon Main | Ujalon Main |
| 2007 | Woh Aur Main | Ujalon Main |
| 2009 | Kahani | Ujalon Main |
| 2011 | Tu Kareeb Hai | Ujalon Main |

== Music videos ==
| Date | Title | Director |
|---|---|---|
| October 2002 | Insaan | Babar Sheikh |
| December 2002 | Meri Terhan | Aqeel |
| March 2003 | Izhar | Visual Experience |
| April 14, 2004 | Kitni Saadian | Babar Sheikh |
| August 13, 2004 | Dil Dil Pakistan (Cover) | Indus Music |
| September 13, 2005 | Panchi | Murtaza Chaudry |
| October 17, 2005 | Meré Khuda | Sohail Akhtar |
| December 26, 2006 | Ujalon Main | Soheb Akhtar |
| December 27, 2007 | Woh Aur Main | Faraz Anwar & Irfan Ahmed |
| May 22, 2011 | Kuch Hai (Coke Studio version) | Rohail Hyatt |
