= List of songs recorded by Mizraab =

This is a comprehensive list of songs by Pakistani progressive rock band Mizraab. The band have released two studio albums, as well as numerous live albums, singles, and music videos. This list does not contain live versions or remixes.

== Original songs ==
Title	Release	Year	Composer(s)
"Aag"	Maazi, Haal, Mustaqbil	2004	Adnan Ahmed, Faraz Anwar
"Agay Barho"	Panchi	1999	Akhtar Qayyum, Faraz Anwar
"Akhir Kyun"	Maazi, Haal, Mustaqbil	2004	Adnan Ahmed, Faraz Anwar
"Insaan"	Maazi, Haal, Mustaqbil	2004	Adnan Ahmed, Faraz Anwar
"Ishq"	Panchi	1999	Akhtar Qayyum, Faraz Anwar
"Izhar"	Maazi, Haal, Mustaqbil	2004	Adnan Ahmed, Faraz Anwar
"Janay Main"	Maazi, Haal, Mustaqbil	2004	Adnan Ahmed, Faraz Anwar
"Kahani"	Panchi	1999	Akhtar Qayyum, Faraz Anwar
"Kitni Sadian"	Maazi, Haal, Mustaqbil	2004	Adnan Ahmed, Faraz Anwar
"Kuch Hai"	Maazi, Haal, Mustaqbil	2004	Adnan Ahmed, Faraz Anwar
"Mayusee"	Panchi and Maazi, Haal, Mustaqbil	1999, 2004	Akhtar Qayyum, Faraz Anwar
"Meri Terhan"	Maazi, Haal, Mustaqbil	2004	Adnan Ahmed, Faraz Anwar
"Muntazir"	Maazi, Haal, Mustaqbil	2004	Adnan Ahmed, Faraz Anwar
"Murshid"	Panchi	1999	Akhtar Qayyum, Faraz Anwar
"Nami"	Panchi	1999	Akhtar Qayyum, Faraz Anwar
"Panchi"	Panchi and Maazi, Haal, Mustaqbil	1999, 2004	Akhtar Qayyum, Faraz Anwar
"Sahil"	Panchi	1999	Akhtar Qayyum, Faraz Anwar
"Tu Kareeb Hai"	Panchi	1999	Akhtar Qayyum, Faraz Anwar
"World Eterne"	Maazi, Haal, Mustaqbil	1999	Adnan Ahmed, Faraz Anwar

== Other songs ==
Title	Release	Year	Original composer(s)
"Meré Khuda"	Single	2005	Adnan Ahmed, Faraz Anwar
"Sari Shamain"	Single	2004	Adnan Ahmed, Faraz Anwar
"Sham-o-Seher"	Single	2005	Adnan Ahmed, Faraz Anwar
"Ujalon Main"	Single	2006	Adnan Ahmed, Faraz Anwar
"Woh Aur Main"	Single	2007	Adnan Ahmed, Faraz Anwar

== Cover versions ==
Title	Release	Year	Original composer(s)
"Dil Dil Pakistan"	Tribute to Vital Signs	2004	Nusrat Hussain, Shoaib Mansoor
