= Janice Miller =

American singer

- Born: Janice Miller; San Francisco, CA
- Origin: Dallas, Texas
- Genres: Pop, Filmi pop, Soul
- Occupations: Singer, Song writer
- Years active: 1992–present
- Website: http://JaniceMillerMusic.com

Janice Miller is an American singer who sings in Urdu, Punjabi and Hindi despite not speaking a word of any of the languages.

== Early life ==
Miller was born in San Francisco, California. Her father was a jazz pianist and mother was a percussionist later in 1976 she moved to Ghana where she became fond of Hindi films.

== Career ==
At the age of 12, Miller returned to the United States and became one of the most sought after cover artists, routinely covering the likes of Noor Jehan in 1992.
In 2005 Miller was invited to Pakistan by former president of Pakistan Pervez Musharraf for a private party in Islamabad.
Her first major concert was at Pakistan Day Parade held in Manhattan in 1992, in which she performed alongside Muhammad Ali Shayki and The Benjamin Sisters. Miller was then named "8th Wonder of World". Miller released her debut album "Sentimental Moments" in 2013 which was a Bollywood-inspired R&B Album. In 2014 she decided to move to Pakistan. In an interview she said: “People have been watching me sing for the last 18 years in the United States. I now wanted to venture out and get some more business.”
Then in early 2015 Janice Miller moved back to the United States settling in Dallas.

== See also ==
- Punjabi music
- List of Punjabi singers
