= Faraz Anwar (film) =

Faraz Anwar - Documentary
- Directed by: Haroon Sheikh
- Produced by: Haroon Sheikh
- Starring: Faraz Anwar; Mizraab
- Edited by: Haroon Sheikh
- Music by: Faraz Anwar
- Distributed by: Poison Wood Productions
- Release date: November 2005 (Pakistan)
- Running time: 30 minutes
- Country: Pakistan
- Languages: Urdu; English

Faraz Anwar – Documentary is a 2005 documentary film directed and produced by Haroon Sheikh. The documentary film follows the experience of Faraz Anwar, lead guitarist and vocalist of the Pakistani progressive rock band Mizraab, in the music industry. The documentary was released in November 2005, by Poison Wood Productions.

== Synopsis ==
The documentary follows the experience of Faraz Anwar, founder, lead guitarist and vocalist of the first Pakistani progressive rock band Mizraab, in the music industry. Faraz Anwar is interviewed by director and producer, Haroon Sheikh, about his musical journey in the music industry and experiences with his band, Mizraab. Faraz also discusses his compositions in music and song writing skills.

The documentary also shows a jam session performed by Faraz during which he tells about the use of different guitar techniques and chords.
