= Nishorgo =

Bangladeshi alternative rock band

Nishorgo নিসর্গ
- Origin: Dhaka, Bangladesh
- Genres: Alternative rock, Bengali folk fusion
- Years active: 2012–present
- Label: CD Choice
- Website: www.nishorgo.band

Nishorgo (Bengali: নিসর্গ), stylized in all caps, is a Bangladeshi alternative rock and Bengali folk-rock fusion band. The band was established on 16 May 2012.

In 2020, on the eighth anniversary of the band's establishment, Nishorgo released its first album, Bastobota, consisting of five songs. Following the release of Nirob Thikana in 2026, the band and the single were covered by several Bangladeshi newspapers and television programmes.

== History ==
Nishorgo was formed on 16 May 2012. The band was founded by Saidul Islam Sohage. Since its formation, the band has produced songs focusing on patriotism, social realities, life struggles, and themes rooted in the traditions of Bengal.

In 2020, the band released its first album, Bastobota.

In the same year, against the backdrop of the COVID-19 pandemic, the song "Fire Ashuk Shukher Din" was released along with a music video.

In 2022, the music video for "Ami Nei" was released. Although the song had been released in 2020 as part of the album Bastobota, its music video was released in 2022.

In 2023, the music video for "Bekar" was released. The song had also been written and released earlier as part of the album Bastobota in 2020, while its music video was released in 2023.

In 2026, the band released the digital single "Nirob Thikana". The song was written and composed by the band's drummer and manager, Tawhidul Islam Shakil.

== Musical style ==
Nishorgo's music reflects influences of alternative rock, Bengali folk music, and contemporary South Asian music. The themes of the band's songs primarily focus on social realities, life experiences, emotions, love, separation, and self-discovery. According to reports published in various media outlets, the band is often seen performing with a combination of modern musical instruments such as electric guitar, bass guitar, keyboard, and drums, alongside traditional folk instruments including the dotara, violin, flute, and ektara. In addition to its original compositions, the band also performs traditional Bangladeshi folk and Baul songs during live shows.

== Members ==
The band's current members are:

- Saidul Islam Sohage – lead vocals, lead guitar, founding member
- Mst Lihat Ara Lamis – female lead vocalist
- Tawhidul Islam Shakil – drums, lyricist, composer and band manager
- James Badal Halder – keyboards and synthesizer
- Tajkiaha – chorus vocals
- Tangim Ahmed Dipu – bass guitar
- Md. Golam Moustafa – guitar

== Discography ==
=== Studio albums ===
Bastobota (2020)

=== Singles ===
- Banglar Joy
- Ami Nei
- Bekar
- Meghla Akash
- Kromosh
- Fire Ashuk Shukher Din
- Nirob Thikana
