= Bewafa (song) =

Song by Imran Khan

Single by Imran Khan

from the album Unforgettable
- Language: Punjabi, English and Urdu
- English title: Unfaithful
- Released: 30 August 2009
- Length: 3:44
- Label: Prestige
- Producer: Hakan Ozan

Music video
- "Bewafa" on YouTube

"Bewafa" (Urdu: بے وفا, lit. ‘Unfaithful’) is a song by Dutch-Pakistani singer, rapper, and songwriter Imran Khan, released on 30 August 2009, as the third single from his debut studio album, Unforgettable. Produced by Hakan Ozan, the song is performed in Punjabi and English and explores themes of betrayal and heartbreak. "Bewafa" peaked at number 2 on the Official Asian Music Chart in 2010, remaining on the chart for 14 weeks.

== Background and release ==
"Bewafa" was released through Prestige Records as part of Imran Khan’s debut album Unforgettable, launched on 27 July 2009. The album, which includes hit singles like "Amplifier" and "Ni Nachleh," marked Khan’s rise to prominence in the UK Punjabi and South Asian music scenes. The song was later re-released as a single by Vijay Records in 2024 and is available on streaming platforms like Spotify, SoundCloud, and Gaana.

== Music and lyrics ==
The song features a blend of Punjabi and English lyrics, characteristic of Imran Khan’s fusion style, combining urban pop with traditional South Asian musical elements. Produced by Hakan Ozan, "Bewafa" has been noted for its emotional resonance, with lyrics addressing betrayal in love, such as "Bewafa nikli hai tu" ("You turned out to be disloyal").

== Charts ==
Chart (Weekly)	Peak position
Asian Music Chart (OCC)	2

== Reception ==
"Bewafa" achieved commercial success, peaking at number 2 on the Official Asian Music Chart in 2010 and charting for 14 weeks. The song's music video, released on YouTube, amassed over 174 million views by January 2026. The album Unforgettable was nominated for Best Album at the 2010 UK Asian Music Awards.
