= Unplugged (Mizraab album) =

Live album by Mizraab
- Released: January 21, 2012
- Recorded: April 1, 2010, at V-Sel Outlet for MTV Pakistan in Karachi, Pakistan
- Genres: Progressive rock, acoustic
- Length: 39:05
- Label: Independent
- Producer: Faraz Anwar

Mizraab chronology
Mizraab - Live & Rare (2010)	Unplugged (2012)	Aag Alive (2013)

Unplugged is the third live album and overall the fifth album by the Pakistani progressive rock band, Mizraab, released in January 2012. It is exclusively a digital download live album, and has not been released on a physical medium. The album included recordings from the band's live performances at the V-Sel Outlet in April 2011. The live performances were recorded for the television program MTV Pakistan Unplugged, but the program never got aired on television.

== Background ==
Mizraab performing live at V-Sel Outlet, Karachi, on April 1, 2011

In 2011, after completing a music production and jazz guitar course in England, Anwar returned to Pakistan and auditioned new members for Mizraab. On March 19, 2011, Mizraab performed live at National University of Computer and Emerging Sciences in Karachi. On April 1, Mizraab performed their first ever unplugged performance at the MTV Unplugged live sessions with a new lineup; Irfan Ahmed on drums, Muhammad Muzzamil on rhythm and Ferdinand Goveas on bass, held at V-Sel Outlet in Karachi.

On May 11, it was confirmed that Mizraab will be performing at Coke Studio season four, which will be aired on May 22, through a Coke Studio television promo of the first episode. On May 14, in a behind the scenes video of Mizraab performing at a Coke Studio session, Faraz Anwar discussed about performing a middle eastern classical track "Kuch Hai" at Coke Studio. On May 22, Mizraab performed "Kuch Hai", from Maazi, Haal, Mustaqbil, featuring Mannan Ali Khan, adding Eastern classical infusion of vocals into the band’s signature rock sound, with backing vocals by Zoe Viccaji and Rachel Viccaji at Coke Studio fourth season first episode. On May 24, in a review of the Coke Studio fourth season, first episode, The Express Tribune newspaper gave the song a 9/10 rating claiming it to be the best performance of the first episode.

On May 31, Mizraab were interviewed at Hum TV programme, Morning with Hum hosted by Noor Bukhari, where the band discussed about their musical journey and talked about their upcoming third studio album. On October 29, Mizraab performed at the Hamdard University Dental Hospital in Karachi. On December 2, Mizraab released their single "Tu Kareeb Hai" from their third album, Ujalon Main.

== Track listing ==
All music written, composed & arranged by Mizraab.

Mizraab - Live & Rare
No.	Title	Length
1.	"Meri Terhan"	8:52
2.	"Woh Aur Main"	5:43
3.	"Panchi"	7:33
4.	"Ujalon Main"	4:25
5.	"Kitni Sadian"	7:09
6.	"Izhar"	5:21
Total length:		39:05

== Personnel ==
All information is taken from the website.

Mizraab

- Faraz Anwar – lead vocals, lead acoustic guitar
- Irfan Ahmad – drums
- Muhammad Muzzamil – rhythm acoustic guitar, backing vocals
- Ferdinand Goveas – bass, backing vocals

Production

- Produced by Faraz Anwar
- Recorded and mixed at V-Sel Outlet for MTV Pakistan in Karachi, Pakistan
