= Killings of Bano Satakzai and Ehsanullah Samalani =

2025 honor killings in Balochistan, Pakistan

On 4 June 2025, newlyweds Bano Satakzai (b. 1 July 1985) and Ehsanullah Samalani were shot to death in the Sanjidi, Degari area of Balochistan, Pakistan. According to local reports, the couple had recently married against the wishes of their families, and were allegedly killed on the orders of a Sardar (tribal chief). The killings have been described as honour killings. However, other sources claimed that the two were not married.

Their deaths came to prominence through a viral video, allegedly of the couple's killings, which circulated widely across social media platforms such as X.

== Killings ==
According to local reports, Bano Bibi had married Ahsan Ullah without the permission of her family; media describing the killings as honour killings. The two were invited to a village under the pretext of a meal. Upon arrival, they were told that tribal elders had given them a death sentence, with the killing ordered by Sardar Satakzai, a Sardar (tribal chief).

In the viral video allegedly of the couple's killings, the two were shot by a dirt road, where a group of men had gathered. The woman in the video, wearing a red outfit with brown shawl, is asked to move away from the vehicles. She then tells a man in Brahui, "Come walk seven steps with me, after that you can shoot me;" shortly afterward, she added "you are allowed only to shoot me. Nothing more than that..." to which the men present respond affirmatively. The woman calmly walked a short distance away from the group, before a man says "kill her" and a burst of gunfire occurs. The men also shot at a man, and continued to shoot at both bodies after they fell to the ground.

== Investigation ==
According to Balochistan official Shahid Rind, neither family reported the couple's deaths.

The autopsy of Bano Satakzai and Ehsanullah Samalani revealed that Bano sustained seven gunshot wounds, while Ehsanullah was shot nine times. Both victims succumbed to their injuries at the scene.

As of 21 July, 2025, 13 individuals had been arrested by Pakistani police, with nine other individuals still being searched for.

== Reactions ==
Social media users condemned those who had shot the couple, including celebrities Annural Khalid, Minal Khan, and Hadiqa Kiani. Balochistan Chief Minister Sarfraz Bugti posted on X that "a terrorism case has been registered on behalf of the state, and one suspected killer has been arrested; the law will take its course in this heinous matter!".

== See also ==
- Honour killing in Pakistan
