= Mizraab =

- Mizraab performing live at V-Sel Outlet, Karachi, in 2011. Visible from left to right are; Ferdinand Goveas, Irfan Ahmed (back), Faraz Anwar and Muhammad Muzzamil.

Background information
- Origin: Karachi, Sindh, Pakistan
- Genres: Progressive rock, progressive metal, classic rock
- Years active: 1997–present
- Website: www.mizraabianz.com

Mizraab are a progressive rock band from Karachi, Sindh, Pakistan, formed in 1997. Founded by vocalist, lead guitarist and songwriter, Faraz Anwar, the band's initial line-up was Faraz Anwar on vocals, Khalid Khan on bass and Akhtar Qayyum on percussions. Since then there had been many changes in the line-up, with the only consistent member being Faraz himself.

The band is well known for being one of the few bands to have brought progressive rock music in Pakistan, thus being one of the few heavy metal music bands to receive significant acknowledgment by the press. The band earned a growing fan base in the underground music community and critical acclaim, with their debut album release Panchi in 1999 described as the first progressive rock album in Pakistan. Faraz Anwar then in 2001 recorded and released An Abstract Point of View through the record label Gnarly Geezer, owned by Allan Holdsworth. The album got rave reviews from musicians all over the world hailing Faraz as a great guitar find from Asia. In 2004, the band, fronted by Faraz, found renewed success and popularity by the release of their second studio album, Maazi, Haal, Mustaqbil, which received too much criticism and critical acclaim. The album sold more than 30,000 copies and is the band's highest selling album. Singles from the album like "Panchi" and "Kitni Sadian" received a lot of airtime on local music channels. The album is also credited to be the first proper Urdu metal album released in Pakistan.

After the release of their second studio album, Mizraab made a comeback into the lime light with the video for "Ujalon Main" in December 2006, which showcased the new band members as well as the change in genre and was well received all over the country. Mizraab's third album was completed in late 2006-2007 but due to the dire state of the music industry in Pakistan, no deal could be reached and the album was shelved.

== Current members ==
Faraz Anwar

- Active: 1997–present
- Instruments: lead vocals, lead guitar
- Release contributions: Panchi (1999), Maazi, Haal, Mustaqbil (2004)

Faraz Anwar (born July 15, 1977) is a Pakistani guitarist and vocalist, known for his solo instrumental work and his band Mizraab. He has been called "Pakistan's master of progressive rock." In 6th grade he decided to pick up a guitar after seeing a video of guitar virtuoso Yngwie Malmsteen on TV. Faraz got his education from St. Paul and St. Andrews, but left after his matriculation because he wanted to pursue a career in music. At the age of 11, he won Pakistan's national music competition, and at 14 he became a full-time musician. Most of his work consisted of touring with top-tier acts and studio collaborations. One of his projects is a collaboration with Imran Raza, which combines classic rock with such Eastern musical influences as "South Asian flutes and classical Sufi singing"; according to The Weekly Standard, it was President Pervez Musharraf of Pakistan who brought the two together.

Irfan Ahmed

- Active: 2002-2010, 2011–present
- Instruments: drums
- Release contributions: Maazi, Haal, Mustaqbil (2004)

Irfan 'Charlie' Ahmed is a Pakistani director and drummer, known for his work with, progressive rock band, Mizraab. He initially started as a session player for the band playing drums on their debut studio album Panchi (1999). In 2002, Ahmed became a permanent member of the band and played drums on the second studio album of the band Maazi, Haal, Mustaqbil (2004). In 2010, when Faraz Anwar went to pursue further education in England, Ahmed left the band. However, after a year when Faraz Anwar returned to Pakistan, Ahmed rejoined the band as its drummer once again. Irfan Ahmed along with Faraz Anwar directed the music video of the song "Woh Aur Main", released in 2007.

Muhammad Muzzamil

- Active: 2011–present
- Instruments: rhythm guitar, backing vocals
- Release contributions: None

Muhammad Muzzamil (born July 19, 1990) is a Pakistani guitarist, known for his work with progressive rock band Mizraab. He is a former student of Faraz Anwar. Muzzamil replaced Yusuke Iwahashi on rhythm guitars in 2011.

Ferdinand Goveas

- Active: 2011–present
- Instruments: bass
- Release contributions: None

Ferdinand Goveas is a Pakistani bassist, known for his work with progressive rock band Mizraab. Goveas has also worked with many well known mainstream bands like Strings and Raeth as a session player. Goveas has also been travelling with Strings as a live sessionist for the band and played bass for Strings in a collaborative song "Jeet Lo Dil" with Indian band Euphoria. In 2011, Goveas replaced James Hobday as the bassist of Mizraab.

The current members of Mizraab
Faraz Anwar
Lead Guitar, Lead Singer

Irfan Ahmed
Drums

Muhammad Muzzamil
Rhythm Guitar

Ferdinand Goveas
Bass

== Former members ==
Akhtar Qayyum

- Active: 1997-1999
- Instruments: percussion
- Release contributions: Panchi (1999)

Khalid Khan

- Active: 1997-2003
- Instruments: bass, backing vocals
- Release contributions: Panchi (1999)

Faraz Arshad

- Active: 2003-2005
- Instruments: bass, backing vocals
- Release contributions: Maazi, Haal, Mustaqbil (2004)

Jamal Mustafa

- Active: 1999-2004
- Instruments: rhythm guitar
- Release contributions: Maazi, Haal, Mustaqbil (2004)

Shahzad Naseem

- Active: 2004-2009
- Instruments: rhythm guitar, backing vocals
- Release contributions: None

Rahail Siddiqui

- Active: 2005-2009
- Instruments: bass, backing vocals
- Release contributions: None

James Hobday

- Active: 2010-2011
- Instruments: bass
- Release contributions: None

Yusuke Iwahashi

- Active: 2010-2011
- Instruments: rhythm guitar
- Release contributions: None

Matthew Curr

- Active: 2010-2011
- Instruments: drums
- Release contributions: None

== Guest appearances ==
Years	Artist	Albums/songs	Instrument	Contribution
1999–2003	Irfan Ahmed	Only live	drums	Played drums in the 1999 studio album, Panchi
1999	Jamal Mustafa	Only live	rhythm guitar	Played rhythm guitar in the 1999 studio album, Panchi
2004	Khalid Khan	Only live	bass	Played bass in the 2004 studio album, Maazi, Haal, Mustaqbil
2010	John "Gumby" Louis Pinto	Only live	drums	Live in Playback
2010	Omran Shafique	Only live	rhythm guitar	Live in Playback
2010	Kamran 'Mannu' Zafar	Only live	bass	Live in Playback
