= Mizraab – Live & Rare =

Live album by Mizraab
- Released: January 1, 2010
- Recorded: August 11, 2007 at MTV Studios in Karachi, Pakistan
- Genre: Progressive rock, progressive metal, heavy metal
- Length: 39:22
- Label: Independent
- Producer: Faraz Anwar

Mizraab chronology
Live at FM 101 (2009)	Mizraab – Live & Rare (2010)	Unplugged (2012)

Mizraab – Live & Rare is the second live album and overall the fourth album by the Pakistani progressive rock band, Mizraab, released in January 2010. It is exclusively a digital download live album, and has not been released on a physical medium. The album included recordings from the band's live performances on MTV Pakistan.

== Track listing ==
All music written, composed & arranged by Mizraab.

Mizraab - Live & Rare
No.	Title	Length
1.	"Meri Terhan"	9:05
2.	"Insaan"	7:06
3.	"Aag"	7:08
4.	"Izhar"	3:32
5.	"Ujalon Main"	4:27
6.	"Panchi"	8:02
Total length:		39:22

== Personnel ==
All information is taken from the website.

Mizraab

- Faraz Anwar - lead vocals, lead guitar
- Irfan Ahmad - drums
- Shahzad Naseem - rhythm guitar, backing vocals
- Rahail Siddiqui - bass, backing vocals

Production

- Produced by Faraz Anwar
- Recorded & Mixed at MTV Studios in Karachi, Pakistan
