= Abstract Point of View =

Studio album by Faraz Anwar
- Released: December 2001
- Recorded: Digital Fidelity Studio in Lahore
- Genres: Instrumental rock, progressive metal, jazz fusion
- Length: 45:18
- Label: Gnarly Geezer
- Producer: Faraz Anwar

Professional ratings
Review scores
Source	Rating
AllMusic	3.5/5 stars

Abstract Point of View is a studio album by guitarist Faraz Anwar, released in December 2001 through Gnarly Geezer Records (an independent label founded in the late 1990s by guitarist Allan Holdsworth) and reissued on September 21, 2004 through Lion Music.

== Track listing ==
All music is composed by Faraz Anwar.

No.	Title	Length
1.	"Through the Passage of Time"	12:43
2.	"Maze"	4:52
3.	"Prophet"	6:55
4.	"Don't Ever Let Your Spirit Die"	5:30
5.	"Last Summer"	4:48
6.	"Why?"	10:30
Total length:		45:18

== Personnel ==
- Faraz Anwar – guitar, keyboard, drum programming (except track 5), sequencing, bass (except track 5), arrangement, mixing, production
- Fahad Khan – drums (track 5)
- Mekaal Hasan – bass (track 5), engineering, mixing, mastering
- Jamal Mustafa – engineering
