= David Zennie =

American director and producer

- Born: David Anthony Zennie; May 3, 1988 (age 38); Cincinnati, Ohio, U.S.A
- Occupations: Director, Film-Maker
- Website: http://www.davidzennie.com

David Zennie (born May 3, 1988) is an American director and producer best known for working with international artists including Imran Khan, Mohammad Assaf and Yo Yo Honey Singh. He splits his time between Los Angeles, California and Dubai, UAE.

== Early career ==
Zennie was born and raised in Cincinnati, Ohio and was drawn to filmmaking at a very young age. After winning a national competition at the age of 14, he directed his first television commercial for Wrigley's Chewing Gum which was shown across the United States on MTV and Comedy Central. After graduating early from Lakota East High School he went on to study film at the Savannah College of Art and Design.

== Works ==
Zennie directed many of the Middle East's first Hip Hop music videos starting in 2008; several of them reached #1 on MTV Arabia’s International Express Chart. In 2011 he crossed over to the Desi market, directing a music video for up and coming Indian rapper Yo Yo Honey Singh. The video for the song Brown Rang showcased the lavishness of Dubai with Zennie’s creative vision, styling, and marketing experience in artist branding being instrumental in the success of the video. After the tremendous success of Brown Rang, Zennie was asked to direct the music video for the song Long Drive for the feature film Khiladi 786 starring Bollywood action superstar Akshay Kumar and Asin Thottumkal.

In 2013, he directed a music video Satisfya for IMRAN KHAN. The music video shows Khan driving a yellow Lamborghini Aventador and sitting with a cheetah. The song won "Best Urban Asian Single" at the 2013 Brit Asia TV Music Awards for "Satisfya". It is one of the most popular songs by Imran Khan and as of 26 October 2020 song's music video has over 500 million+ views on YouTube. Asian Image described the song as catchy and motivational.

In 2013 Zennie was selected by Chrysler to direct their latest television commercial for the Chrysler 300C featuring the Beats By Dr. Dre speaker option. The commercial titled “A Salute to the Driven Class” featured Emirati entertainment personality DJ Bliss.

Through the years Zennie has compiled a diverse portfolio of work consisting of over 70 international productions. He has also filmed on location around the world in India, the United Kingdom, China, Qatar, Sudan, Saudi Arabia, and Lebanon.

== Awards and nominations ==
In May 2012 Zennie was featured on the cover of the Middle East's leading industry magazine Digital Studio. Zennie is also a 3 time Murex D’or Nominee for his work with Lebanese artists Joseph Attieh and Joe Ashkar.

- Best Director & Best Music Video 2012 Middle East Music Awards
- MTV India VMA for Yo Yo Honey Singh - Brown Rang
- 3x Murex D’or Award Nominee
- "Best Urban Asian Single" at the 2013 Brit Asia TV Music Awards for "Satisfya"
- Imran Khan - Satisfya Best Music Video Nominee at the 2013 BritAsia Awards

== Film ==
After achieving tremendous success in the India music video market, in 2013 Zennie began to develop his first feature film, an edgy, action packed film with heart based in exotic Goa, India. The film is currently in development with principal photography scheduled to begin in 2015.

== Filmography ==
Music Videos

Award Nominated/Winning

·2021- Guru Randhawa- Nain Bengali (DIRECTOR)

·2016- Bilal Saeed - PARANDAY (DIRECTOR)

.2016- Mika Singh - BILLO ( DIRECTOR)

•2015 - Imran Khan - Imaginary (Director/Editor)

•2015 - L'Omari - Wonder Why

•2015 - DJ Bliss feat. Mims - Shining

•2014 – Dounia Batma – Hani Hani (Director)

•2014 – Mohammed Assaf – Ya Hali Ya Mali (Director)

•2013 - Shatha Hassoun – Khatiya (Director)

•2013 - Karl Wolf – Go Your Own Way (Producer/Director/Editor)

•2013 - Imran Khan – Satisfya - (Producer/Director/Editor no.1 in the world music)*

•2013 - DJ Bliss feat. Kardinal Offishall – Let It Go (Producer/Director/Editor)

•2012- Akshay Kumar –Long Drive from the Bollywood film Khiladi 786 (Co-Producer/Director)

•2012- Yo Yo Honey Singh – S.A.T.A.N. (Filmed in Goa, India) (Director/Editor)

•2012- Leo feat. Yo Yo Honey Singh – Break Up Party (Producer/Director/Editor)

•2012 - Sandy feat. Karl Wolf – Awel Mara Atgaraa (Winner “Best Duet” and “Best Director” 2012 Middle East Music Awards) (Producer/Director/Editor)*

•2012 - Joe Ashkar- TA3EE (2012 Murex D’or Nominee Best Arab Music Video of the Year) (Co-Producer/Director/Editor)*

•2012 - Yo Yo Honey Singh - Brown Rang (#1 Trending YouTube video in India 2012, MTV India Award Winning) (Producer/Director/Editor)*

•2012 - Sofia Marikh - Ta7t Enazar (Release Date TBD) (Producer/Director/Editor)

•2011 - Yo Yo Honey Singh - Brown Rang (#1 Trending YouTube video in India 2012, MTV India Award Winning) (Producer/Director/Editor)*

•2011 - Hishaam - Doublin’ (Producer/Co-Director/Editor)

•2011- Quincy Jones – Tomorrow/Bokra Making Of (Filmed in Doha, Qatar) (Director)

•2011 - Sandy - Ahsan Men Kteer (Producer/Director/Editor)

•2011 - Sandy- Ayza A’olak (Producer/Director/Editor)

•2011 - Desert Heat - CruZin (Braun Campaign Track) (Producer/Director/Editor)

•2011 - Karl Wolf - Get Fresh, Get Close ( Close Up Arabia Campaign Track) (Director/Editor)

•2011 - Rakan - Stubborn (Producer/Director/Editor)

•2011 - Rojeh - Shab Arabi (Producer/Director/Editor)

•2010 - MC Amin - The General (Director/Editor)

•2010 - Joseph Attieh - Mawhoum (2010 - 2011 Murex D’or Nominee Best Arab Music Video of the Year) (Producer/Director/Editor)*

•2010 - Joseph Attieh - Taeb Al Shawk (2010 - 2011 Murex D’or Nominee Best Arab Music Video of the Year) (Producer/Director/Editor)*

•2010 - Sandy - Hassal Khier (Producer/Director/Editor)

•2010 - Layal Watfeh - Modernistic Manito ( Filmed in Beijing, China) (Director/Editor)

•2010 - Foreign Beggars - Get A Bit More ( Filmed in London, UK) (Director/Editor)

•2010 - S1 - Desert Dream (Producer/Director/Editor)

•2010 - Young Vaughn - Loser (Producer/Director/Editor)

•2009 - Qusai - That's Life (Director/Editor)

•2009 - Qusai- Mother (Director/Editor)

•2009 - The Truth - Can't you See PT 2 (Producer/Director/Editor)

•2009 - E.B. - High (Producer/Director/Editor)

•2009 - Desert Heat - Under Her Feet ( Sponsored By Hummer) (Producer/Director/Editor)

•2009 - Omar Fights Back - Keep On Runnin’ (Producer/Director/Editor)

•2008 - Jaxx - The Only Way (Producer/Director/Editor)

•2008 - A-Class feat K-Young - I Like It (Producer/Director/Editor)

•2008 - Kaz Money - The Hook (#1 MTV Arabia Video Chart) (Producer/Director/Editor)

•2008 - Jaxxma - Here I Come (#1 MTV Arabia Video Chart) (Producer/Director/Editor)

•2008 - Sham - One & Only (#1 MTV Arabia Video Chart) (Producer/Director/Editor)

== Television ==
MBC – Wannasah • 2010 - Season 1 Bait Al Hip Hop TV Show (Sponsored by Pepsi) (Director)

== Commercial ==
Al Sharqiya Television • 2014- 10 Year Anniversary TVC

Chrysler 300S (Director) • 2013 - Salute To The Driven Class

Mountain Dew (Director) • 2012- Dew Arabia “Dew Crew”

Lay's Arabia (Producer/Director) • 2012 - Flavor Announcement- Pizza Flavor TVC

Dubai Fighting Championships (Producer/Director/Editor) • 2012 - Promotional Video

SuperMax (Director) • 2012- Kwik3 30 sec. Africa TVC • 2012- Kwik3 30 sec. English TVC

Red Crescent (Charity/NPO) (Director) • 2010 - 60 sec. TVC Hope Campaign (Shot in Chun Chung China) • 2010 - 4 x 45 sec. TVC Ramadan Campaign • 2010 - 45 sec. TVC Education Campaign • 2009 - 60 sec. TVC Hajj Campaign • 2009 - 60 sec. TVC Ramadan Campaign • 2008 - 3x 45 sec. TVC Shadows Campaign

Wrigley's Winterfresh Gum (Producer/Director/Editor) • 2003 - 15 sec USA National TVC ( Comedy Central, Fox, MTV)

== Corporate ==
UAE Supreme Court (Director) • 2013 – 40 Year Anniversary Corporate Film

Bank Of Khartoum (Producer/Director) • 2013 - Corporate Video, TVC & 9 Viral Shorts

UAE Prime Minister's Office (Producer/Director) • 2013 - Government Summit Video

Jebel Ali Free Zone (Jafza) (Producer/Director) • 2012- Why Jafza? • 2012- Why Dubai? • 2012- Application Video Guide • 2012- Jafza Products Videos • 2012 - One Stop Shop

Braun (Producer) • 2012 - Hair Pride Campaign Video

Saudi Electricity Company (Producer/Director) • 2012 - Corporate Film

Abu Dhabi Municipality (Director) • 2011 - Accomplishments Corporate Film

Dubai Islamic Bank (Producer/Director) • 2012 - Excel to Excellence Corporate Film • 2011 - Accomplishments Corporate Film • 2010 - Historical Corporate Film

Takaful Emarat Insurance (Producer/Director) • 2011 - Corporate Film and TVC

Atlantis The Palm (Producer/Director) • 2011 - Brand Awareness Corporate Film • 2011 & 2010 - Training Film (Building Leaders & Engaging Services) • 2010 - Motivational Film

Ajman Government (Director) • 2010 - Excellency Awards Corporate Film

Secure Parking (Producer/Director) • 2010 - Online Promotional Video

Dubai Airports (Producer/Director/Editor) • 2009 - Dubai Airports CEO Web Casts (Internal Corporate Communications)

Dirat Ajdady Al-Waleed Bin Talal Charity/NPO (Co-Producer/Director/Editor) • 2009 - Awareness Film & Corporate Film (Shot in Jeddah, KSA)

Paris Valley Perfume (Co-Producer/Director/Editor) • 2009 - Viral Video Campaign (5 x 60 sec Viral Videos)

Mierc Training & Consulting (Producer/Director/Editor)
