= Satisfya =

Single by Imran Khan
- Language: Punjabi and English
- Released: 24 May 2012
- Recorded: December 2011
- Genre: Urban contemporary; Pakistani hip hop; Punjabi music
- Length: 3:06 (music video); 3:00 (audio)
- Label: IK Records
- Songwriter: Imran Khan
- Producer: Eren E

Music video
- "Satisfya" on YouTube

"Satisfya" is a Punjabi hip-hop single by Imran Khan. According to Imran, he was sitting in his car when he started imagining about a Lamborghini. He wrote the entire song and recorded it then itself in December 2011.

The song was originally released online on 24 May 2012, and on YouTube on 10 May 2013 via his independent record label called IK Records. The song has crossed 1 billion views on YouTube as of March 2026.

== Reception ==
As of 24 March 2026, the song's official music video has over 1 billion views on the media platform YouTube. Produced by Eren E and directed by David Zennie, it is one of the most popular songs by Imran Khan. Asian Image described the song as catchy and motivational. It has gained popularity after it was used in many Tik-Tok and other short videos sharing media mainly in the Indian subcontinent.

== Charts ==
Chart (Weekly)	Peak position
United Kingdom (OCC): Independent Single; Independent Single Breakers; Asian Music	13; 1; 1
"—" denotes a recording that did not chart or was not released in that territory
