= Annural Khalid =

Pakistani musician (born 1999)

- Born: October 13, 1999 (age 27); Islamabad, Pakistan
- Genres: Pop, R&B, Soul
- Occupation: Singer-songwriter
- Years active: 2020–present
- Label: Warner Music South Asia

Annural Khalid (born 1999) is a Pakistani singer-songwriter known for her soulful voice, chill pop, and R&B influences. She gained prominence with tracks like Trust Issues and Dil De Bol, and has become one of Pakistan’s rapidly rising music stars, earning international attention.

== Career ==
In 2023, Annural released Trust Issues, a soulful R&B track that earned her a spot on Spotify’s EQUAL Pakistan playlist.

In January 2024, Annural was named Spotify Pakistan’s first-ever female RADAR artist and featured on a Times Square billboard in New York City.

Annural later collaborated with Indian artist Burrah on the single Mumtaaz, a Punjabi chill-pop song that blends emotional lyrics with a mellow beat, released under Warner Music India.

== Musical style and influences ==
Annural’s music is characterized by a mix of pop and R&B.

== Discography ==
- Lost (2021)
- Dil De Bol (2021)
- Faaslay (2021)
- Mujhe Le Chal (2021)
- Promises - feat. Shamoon (2021)
- Pretty Lies (2021)
- Say My Name (2022)
- Vivid (2022)
- Trust Issues (2022)
- Terey Liye (2022)
- Sohneya Ve (2022)
- Kyun - feat. Talha Anjum (2022)
- Keh Dena - feat. Abdul Hannan (2023)
- Conversation - feat. Talwiinder, NDS (2023)
- YDKILY (2023)
- Hopeless (2023)
- Love Again (2023)
- Cham Cham (2024)
- All We Had - feat. Asim Azher (2024)
- Never There - feat. Talha Anjum (2025)
- Chori Chupke (2025)
- Mumtaaz (with Burrah) (2025)

=== Coke Studio (Pakistan) ===
Year	Season	#	Song	Co-singer(s)	Notes
2024	15	1	"Jhol"	"Maanu"	

=== Velo Sound Station (Pakistan) ===
Year	Season	#	Song	Co-singer(s)	Notes
2025	03	1	"Dil Ruba"	"Hasan Raheem"	

== Recognition ==
- Spotify RADAR Pakistan Artist – first female artist (2024)
- Featured on Times Square Billboard, New York City (2024)
