= Imran Khan (singer) =

Dutch musician (born 1984)

Imran Khan عمران خان
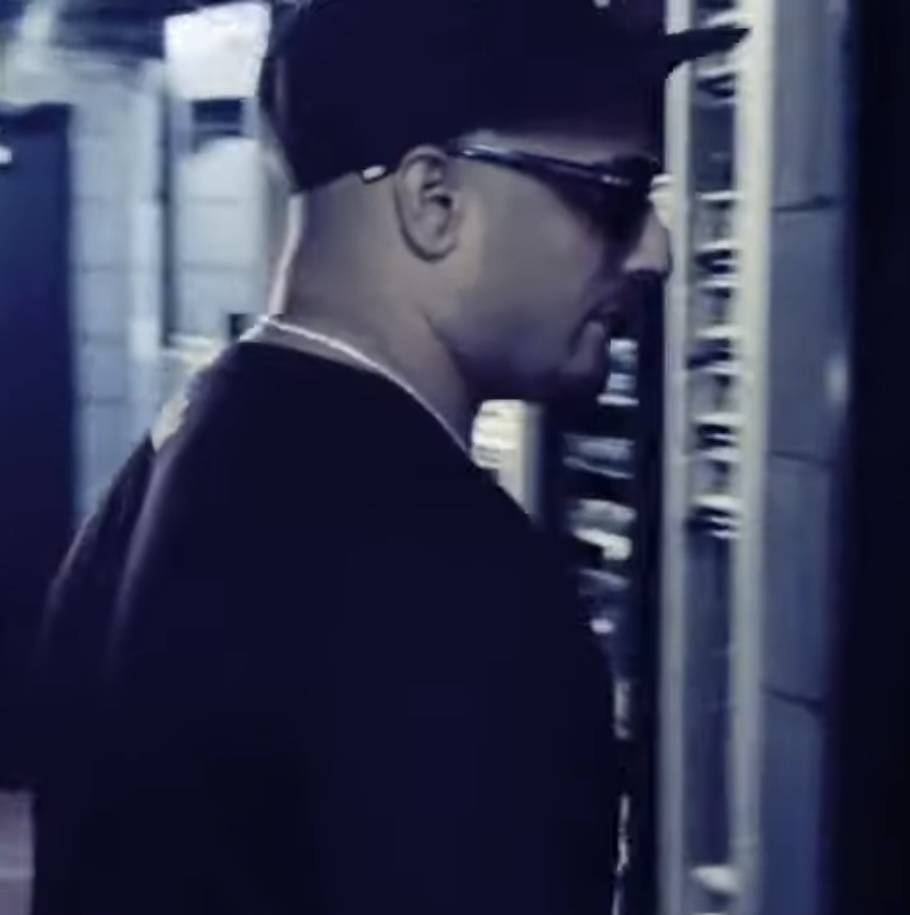
- Imran Khan - Perth, Australia 2016

Background information
- Also known as: IK
- Born: 28 May 1984 (age 42); The Hague, Netherlands
- Genres: Hip hop; pop; Punjabi; urban
- Occupations: Singer; rapper; songwriter
- Instrument: Vocals
- Years active: 2007–present
- Labels: Prestige (2007–2011); IK Records (2011–present)
- Website: https://imrankhanworld.com/

Imran Khan (Note: Punjabi: عمران خان, romanized: Imrān Khān) (born 28 May 1984) is a Dutch singer-songwriter and rapper, primarily associated with Punjabi-language music. His genre includes hip hop and pop music. He rose to popularity in 2007 after the release of his first single "Ni Nachleh", and was signed to Prestige Records later that year. His song "Satisfya", released in 2013, is his most-viewed YouTube video with over 1 billion views. His second single, "Amplifier", was released in 2009 and recently crossed 1 billion views. His debut studio album, Unforgettable, was released on 27 July 2009 via Prestige Records, which included "Bewafa".

== Early life ==
Khan was born in The Hague on 28 May 1984, the son of Pakistani immigrant parents from Gujranwala, Punjab, Pakistan who have Punjabi Muslim ancestry. He has two brothers and one sister.

== Career ==
Khan started his music career in his late teens. After Prestige Records released his debut single "Ni Nachleh", he continued his career by performing in several countries.

Khan's second single, "Amplifier", was released on 12 July 2009. It has received over 1 billion views on YouTube.

In 2009, Khan released his debut album, Unforgettable. It includes famous singles like "Amplifier", "Bewafa", "Pata Chalgea", and a remix of "Ni Nachleh". It was nominated for Best Album at the 2010 UK Asian Music Awards but did not win.

In 2011, Khan departed Prestige Records to start his own label IK Records. He released the single "Satisfya" on 9 May 2013. The music video shows Khan driving a yellow Lamborghini Aventador and sitting with a cheetah. The video was directed by David Zennie, and has over 1 billion views as of May 2026.

In 2015, Khan made his Bollywood debut as a singer of the song "Let's Celebrate" for the Hindi film Tevar.

Khan released a single "Imaginary" on 8 June 2015, and shot the video with David Zennie at Akon's house in Los Angeles. The song peaked at rank 1 on the Asian Music Chart and the video has received 134 million views as of January 2026.

In 2016, Khan came out with another song, "Hattrick" featuring Yaygo Musalini.

In 2018, Khan released a new single, "Knightridah", which peaked at number 1 on the Asian Music Chart.

In 2021, he released two singles, "M.O.B." on 14 May, featuring J.J. Esko; and "They Don't Like It" on 28 September.

In 2022, Khan released "On My Way" (featuring Meez).

== Discography ==
=== Albums ===
==== Unforgettable (2009) ====
Unforgettable is Khan's debut album, released on 27 July 2009 via Prestige Records. It was produced by Eren E and Hakan Ozan. It contains 15 tracks. The album was nominated for the "Best Album" award at the UK Asian Music Awards 2010 and won "Best Album" at the 2010 Brit Asia TV Music Awards.

Track listing
| No. | Title | Producer(s) | Length |
|---|---|---|---|
| 1. | "Amplifier" | Eren E | 3:53 |
| 2. | "Aaja We Mahiya (Come, My Love)" | Eren E | 3:52 |
| 3. | "Hey Girl" | Eren E | 3:18 |
| 4. | "Peli Waar (The First Time)" | Eren E | 3:10 |
| 5. | "Chak Glass (Grab a Glass)" | Eren E | 3:08 |
| 6. | "Nazar (Glance)" | Eren E | 3:06 |
| 7. | "Superstar" | Eren E | 3:25 |
| 8. | "Gora Gora Rang (Fair Skinned)" (featuring Mr. Probz) | Eren E | 4:25 |
| 9. | "Bounce Billo" | Eren E | 4:07 |
| 10. | "Ni Nachleh (Hey, Dance)" (feat. MC Spyder) | Eren E | 3:35 |
| 11. | "40 Pra (Forty Brothers)" | Eren E | 3:12 |
| 12. | "Pata Chalgea (I Have Found Out)" | Eren E | 4:45 |
| 13. | "Bewafa (Unfaithful)" | Hakan Ozan | 3:44 |
| 14. | "Nai Reina (Don't Want to Stay)" | Hakan Ozan | 3:04 |
| 15. | "Qott Ghusian Da (A Sip of Happiness)" (feat. Shabby) | Hakan Ozan | 2:58 |
| Total length: | | | 47:28 |

== Singles discography ==
=== As lead artist ===
| Title | Year | Music | Peak chart position | Label | Album | Reference(s) |
| Title | Year | Music | UK Asian | Label | Album | Reference(s) |
|---|---|---|---|---|---|---|
| "Amplifier" | 2009 | Eren E | | Prestige Records | Unforgettable | |
| "Bewafa" | 2009 | Hakan Ozan | | Prestige Records | Unforgettable | |
| "Satisfya" | 2013 | Eren E | 1 | IK Records | | |
| "Let's Celebrate" (featuring Sonakshi Sinha) | 2015 | Imran Khan | | Eros International | Tevar | |
| "Imaginary" | 2015 | Eren E | | IK Records | | |
| "Hattrick" (featuring Yaygo Musalini) | 2016 | Donray | | IK Records | | |
| "Zina" (Twin n Twice featuring Imran Khan) | 2017 | Imran Khan | | IK Records | | |
| "President Roley" | 2017 | Donray | | IK Records | | |
| "Knightridah" | 2018 | Donray | 1 | IK Records | | |
| "M.O.B." (featuring J.J. Esko) | 2021 | Toxic | | IK Records | | |
| "They Don't Like It" | 2021 | Southside (record producer) 808 Mafia | | IK Records | | |
| "On My Way" (featuring Meez) | 2022 | C2Producer | | IK Records | | |
| "Deposit" | 2024 | CHAHID | | IK Records | | |
| "Radioactive" | 2024 | CHAHID | | | | |
| "Humankind" | 2024 | CHAHID | | | | |

=== Remixes ===
- 2007 "Ni Nachleh" (feat. MC Spyder) [Eren E. Electro Remix]
- 2007 "Ni na Nachleh" (feat. MC Spyder) [Eren E. Electro Extended Mix]
- 2007 "Ni Nachleh" (Eren E. Disco Remix)
- 2007 "Ni Nachleh" (Eren E. Disco Dub Mix)
- "Aaja We Mahiya" (Infidel Mix)
- "Gora Gora Rang" (Remix)
- "Scream" (2020 Hexa Remix)

== Awards and nominations ==
- Won "Best Album" at the 2010 Brit Asia TV Music Awards for Unforgettable
- Nominated for four awards at the 2010 UK Asian Music Awards: "Best Album", "Best Video" for "Amplifier", "Best Male Act" and "Best Desi Act", winning "Best Desi Act"
- Won "Male Musical Artist of the Year" at the 2010 Anokhi Magazine Awards
- Won "Best Urban Asian Single" at the 2013 Brit Asia TV Music Awards for "Satisfya"
- Won three awards in 2015 from Pakistani Music and Media Awards (PMMA) for best songwriter, best video (for "Imaginary") and best song (for "Imaginary")
- Won three awards at the 2015 Brit Asia TV Music Awards: "Best Urban Asian Act", "Best Music Video" for "Imaginary" and "Best UK Single" for "Imaginary"

== Tours ==
- Imran Khan – Takeover Tour USA (2011)
- Imran Khan – Australia & New Zealand Tour (2011)
- Imran Khan – Unforgettable Tour India (2022)
