= The Benjamin Sisters =

Pakistani singing group

The Benjamin Sisters (Urdu: بنجمن سسٹرز) were a Pakistani girl group. The group consisted of sisters Nerissa, Beena, and Shabana Benjamin. They were introduced to Pakistani showbiz by a notable Pakistani sitar player Javed Allah Ditta.

== Singing style ==
Usually they sang in choruses-singing together in performances on Pakistan Television in the late 1970s and early 1980s. They achieved immense popularity in both Pakistan and neighboring regions of North India in what began to be referred to as the Benjamin Sisters Phenomenon. They were introduced to showbiz by Javed Allah Ditta, a notable sitar player. Victor Benjamin, their father, a skillful player of the xylophone encouraged his daughters to sing. They then joined the Sunday School choir at The Christ Church - this was all the musical training that they had received.

The Benjamin Sisters first participated in various music learning programs aired on Pakistan Television from 1968 to 1987. These programs were conducted by Sohail Rana; a prominent music director of Pakistan, and they were aimed at educating children about music. The sisters usually sang Punjabi and Urdu songs, and tended to initially provide new renderings of songs sung by other artists as opposed to developing their own material. This was partially because the sisters initially appeared in the TV talk show Silver Jubilee (1983), where old artistes were often the invited guests whose songs the sisters would perform as a tribute to them. The three sisters sang in a synchronized way, in a "single voice". The sisters later achieved further fame after the release of the patriotic national songs of Pakistan, such as the Iss parcham kay saye taley, hum ek hain, Ay roohe quaid aaj ke din ham tujh sey wada kartey hain, Khayal rakhna khayal rakhna etc. which they sang during the 1980s.

== Family background ==
The Benjamin Sisters are from a Pakistani Christian family.

In 1987, one of the three sisters, Nerissa, got married and the Benjamin Sisters Group disbanded at the peak of their popularity. As of November 2011, Nerissa teaches at St. Patrick's High School in Karachi and Beena works as a voiceover artist and a VJ. Whereas, Shabana Kenneth is a housewife. Nerissa has two sons and one daughter (Melissa, Chris and Ashlin) while Beena has been blessed with a daughter (Alysia). Shabana has two sons and a daughter as well (Sherwin, Victor and Mary).

== See also ==
- Qaumi Tarana
- Pakistani rock
- Music of Pakistan
- Pop music
- List of Pakistani pop singers
