= Filmi pop =

Filmi pop (Urdu: فلمی موسیقی filmi mosiqi) is a term coined by Pakistani music journalist, Ali Tim in 1990 but made famous by the country's most influential pop critic, Nadeem F. Paracha. In 1966, a talented young playback singer Ahmed Rushdi (now considered one of the greatest singers of south Asia) sang the first South Asian pop song ‘Ko Ko Korina’" for the film Armaan. Composed by Sohail Rana, the song was a blend of 1960s bubblegum pop, rock and roll twist music and Pakistani film music. This genre would later be termed as filmi pop. Paired with Runa Laila, the singer is considered the pioneering father of pop music, mostly hip-hop and disco, in South Asia.

Following Rushdi's success, Christian bands specialising in jazz started performing at various night clubs and hotel lobbies in Karachi, Hyderabad and Lahore. They would usually sing either famous American jazz hits or cover Rushdi's songs. Rushdi sang playback hits along with Laila until the Bangladesh Liberation War when East Pakistan was declared an independent state. Laila, being a Bengali, decided to leave for the new-found Bangladesh.

== See also ==
- Pakistani pop
- Pakistani hip hop
- Pakistani rock
