= Aamir Saleem =

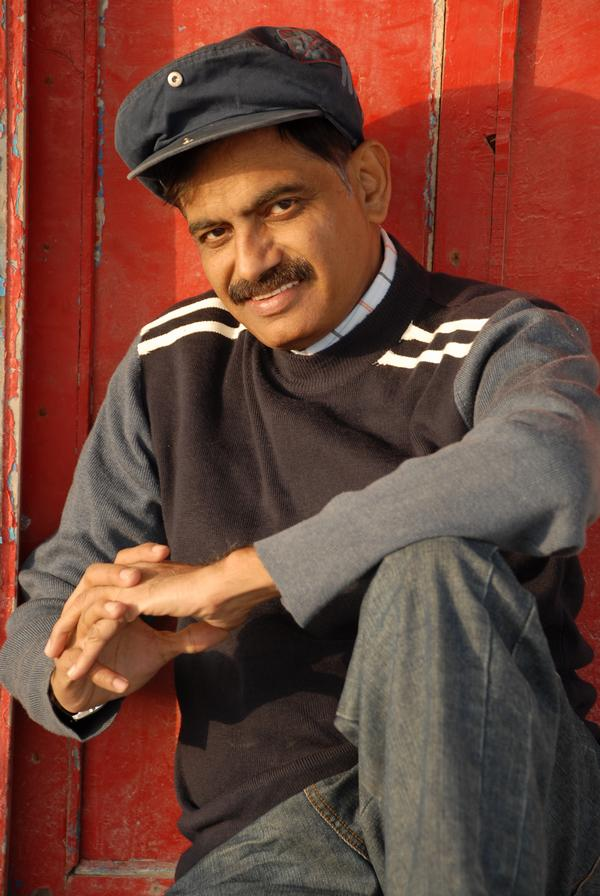

Background information
- Born: Muhammad Aamir Saleem; 20 February 1959 (age 67)
- Origin: Multan, Punjab, Pakistan
- Genres: Pop, electronic, folk
- Occupations: Singer-songwriter, musician, composer
- Years active: 1991–present

Aamir Saleem (Punjabi, Urdu: عامر سلیم, born 20 February in Multan, Pakistan) is a Pakistani singer, composer, songwriter, host and photographer and music video director who had several hits in the early 1990s, including "Woh Taron Bhari", "C.B. Chali Ana", and "Ajnabi".

He has worked as a director for music videos and road shows with anchor Ali Salman on MTV Pakistan, under the name of Bad Company. He hosted live shows on FM 107, FM 100 (Karachi). He also hosted a live show on PTV National for more than 8 years. He was the singer of the first title song for Geo TV program Hum Sub Umeed Se Hain. He has also acted in the telefilm Daira on Geo TV. His last releases were a Sufi song especially made for Ramadan titled "Jindri" and a song on Mothers day by the name of Maa.

== Biography ==
=== Early life ===
Aamir Saleem started singing when he was in school and he bought his first guitar after working in a hotel as a receptionist in summer holidays. He formed his first music band with the name "Image", his best friend Naveed Mugees was on guitar and Alim Arshid was on keyboard. After that he moved to Karachi in 1986.

 He used to sing with different bands to make money and record his first solo album that took three years to complete.[9]

== Discography ==
=== Albums ===
Release date	Album
1991	MUSAFIR
1993	AJNABI
1995	HUMSAFAR
1997	MOHABBAT
2002	KHWAAB
2006	DIL DA QUATER

=== Notable songs ===
Ajnabi
Woh Taron Bhari
C.B Chali Ana
Challa (Folk)
Wrong Number
Ishq
Saza
Kal Tum Say
Rannu
Aseen Apnay Aap
Afsana
Apna Garan (Folk)

=== Single(s) ===
Jindri (SR Records)
Maa (SR Records)
Woh Beetay Din (Remix)(SR Records)
Diya Jalay Rakhna (BMN Azadi Hits)
Lahore (Daira Vol 1 – For Daira Movie by Geo TV)
Hum Sub Umeed Se Hain (Title song)
