= Maazi, Haal, Mustaqbil =

Studio album by Mizraab
- Released: March 8, 2004
- Recorded: 2003–2004 at 8-93 in Karachi, Pakistan
- Genre: Progressive rock, progressive metal, heavy metal
- Length: 69:59
- Label: Sadaf Stereo
- Producer: Faraz Anwar

Mizraab chronology
Panchi (1999)	Maazi, Haal, Mustaqbil (2004)	Live at FM 101 (2009)

Singles from Maazi, Haal, Mustaqbil
- 1. "Insaan" Released: October 2002; 2. "Meri Terhan" Released: December 2002; 3. "Izhar" Released: March 2003; 4. "Kitni Sadian" Released: April 14, 2004; 5. "Panchi" Released: September 13, 2005

Maazi, Haal, Mustaqbil (Urdu: ماضی، حال، مستقبل, literal English translation: "past, present, future") is the second studio album of the Pakistani progressive rock band Mizraab, released in March, 2004 on Sadaf Stereo. The album is credited to be the first proper Urdu metal album released in Pakistan. Lyrically, the album contains references to life, death, nature and the environment a person lives in.

The album was recorded and produced by vocalist and lead guitarist Faraz Anwar. The album is the second album produced by Faraz. The album is entirely a progressive rock and heavy metal album and the first concept album which is released in Pakistan.

Maazi, Haal, Mustaqbil was released to critical acclaim and commercial success. Five singles have been released in promotion of the album along with their music videos; "Meri Terhan" and "Insaan" in 2002, "Izhar" in March 2003, "Kitne Sadian" in April 2004 and "Panchi" in September 2005. "Kitne Sadian", "Insaan" and "Meri Terhan" did very well at the local music charts. The album received generally positive reviews from music critics. The album sold more than 30,000 copies upon its release and is the band's highest selling album.

== Background ==
After Akhthar Qayyum left the band, Faraz Anwar recruited two new members Jamal Mustafa on rhythm guitars and Irfan Ahmed on drums. The band then started working on their second studio album. Firstly, the band struggled to strike a record deal as no record label was willing to release a progressive rock album as the general Pakistani audience were not aware of the genre. Leaving aside the record labels, the band also faced opposition from the local music channels as they banned the band from playing their music videos which were initially given a lot of air time. Music videos of singles "Insaan", released in October 2002, and "Meri Terhan", released in December, were banned from playing on many local music channels.

However, the band did not gave up and went on recording and releasing their third single music video, "Izhar", for the 2003 Cricket World Cup and dedicated the song to the Pakistan cricket team. The video of the song was made in a very short period of time and was released in March 2003. The video was a success and received a lot of air time play on music channels and was even played internationally on the Dubai based sports channel Ten Sports. After the release of "Izhar", Khalid Khan also left the band due to playing bass for two bands at one time, Mizraab and Aaroh. Aaroh had already broken into the mainstream and Mizraab was not going to remain underground much longer. Realising that it was difficult for him to continue with both these demanding acts, the band decided that Khalid should limit himself to one of these. So, Khalid ended up parting ways with the band and became a full-time band member of Aaroh. Faraz Arshad, an ex-student of Faraz Awar, replaced Khalid Khan on bass guitars.

== Reception ==
On April 14, 2004, Mizraab released their fourth single "Kitni Sadian" music video directed by Babar Sheikh from their upcoming second studio album. On March 8, Mizraab released their second studio album Maazi, Haal, Mustaqbil, which found the band renewed popularity and success. The album was released by the record label, Sadaf Stereo and was quickly sold out in the market. The album received much criticism and acclaim by critics. The album also featured the two new recruits in the band, Jamal Mustafa and Faraz Arshad. The album was released after 3 years of struggle because no record label was interested in releasing a progressive rock format album in Pakistan. However, the album sold more than 30,000 copies upon release and the album sales surprised the record label and was forced to print out more copies because of its demand. Maazi Haal Mustaqbil credited to be the first proper Urdu metal album released and the first ever progressive concept album released in Pakistan. Due to the success of the album, at the Lux Style Awards 2004, the album was nominated for the "Best Music Album" award.

On August 5, 2007, Mizraab's single "Insaan" was at number #1 for the download of the week by Instep magazine.

== Track listing ==
All music composed & arranged by Faraz Anwar. All songs written by Adnan Ahmed, those which are not are mentioned below.

Maazi, Haal, Mustaqbil
No.	Title	Writer(s)	Length
1.	"Mayusee"	Akhtar Qayyum	9:11
2.	"Panchi"	Akhtar Qayyum	6:32
3.	"World Eterne"		2:06
4.	"Meri Terhan"		4:24
5.	"Janay Main"		5:58
6.	"Insaan"		6:40
7.	"Aag"		5:43
8.	"Kitni Sadian"		6:33
9.	"Muntazir"		5:23
10.	"Akhir Kyun"		7:18
11.	"Kuch Hai"		6:35
12.	"Izhar"		3:28
Total length:			1:09:59

== Personnel ==
All information is taken from the CD.

Mizraab

- Faraz Anwar - lead vocals, lead guitar
- Irfan Ahmed - drums
- Jamal Mustafa - rhythm guitar
- Faraz Arshad - bass, backing vocals

Additional musicians

- Khalid Mustafa Khan - bass

Production

- Produced by Mizraab
- Recorded by Faraz Anwar and Jamal Mustafa
- Recorded & mixed at 8–93 in Karachi, Pakistan
- Web designing by Syed Abdul Moni
- Cover concept and design by Babar Sheikh
- Photography by Babar Sheikh, Murtaza and Ibaad
- Additional artwork by Khurrum Khan
