= Panchi =

Studio album by Mizraab
- Released: April 1999
- Recorded: 1998–1999 at Karachi, Pakistan
- Genre: Progressive rock, progressive metal, classical rock
- Length: 49:39
- Label: Sound Master
- Producer: Faraz Anwar

Mizraab chronology
Panchi (1999)	Maazi, Haal, Mustaqbil (2004)

Panchi (Urdu: پہنچی, literal English translation: "bird") is the debut studio album of the Pakistani progressive rock band Mizraab, released in April 1999 on Sound Master. Mizraab's debut album is considered by many to be the first progressive rock album in Pakistan.

The album was recorded and composed by founder, lead vocalist and guitarist Faraz Anwar. According to Faraz, the album was an experiment in exploring new musical styles, as the album contains fast tempos, instrumentals, and aggressive musicianship blending with eastern classical music like the use of tablas and traditional Pakistani folk music elements. Panchi was not a commercial success. However, the release of the album earned the band a growing fan base in the underground music community and critical acclaim and thus the album was regarded as the first progressive rock album in the country.

== Background ==
Although initially, the album was not meant for release and Faraz did not want it to be more than an experiment. "The album was good but I felt strongly about re-doing it. Not revamping but redoing it," he says. However, Akhtar Qayyum went on to strike a record deal with Sound Master and the album was released in 1999. "I had no idea that Akhtar would go out and release it, which he did. It did well but I wasn't expecting the album to hit the market," says Faraz. This led to strained relations between Akhthar and Faraz, and Akhthar soon left the band due to musical differences.

The album included fast tempos, instrumentals, and aggressive musicianship that placed them as one of the pioneers of progressive metal music in Pakistan. The release of the album also earned the band a growing fan base in the underground music community and critical acclaim and thus the album was regarded as the first progressive rock album in the country.

== Track listing ==
All music composed & arranged by Mizraab. All songs written by Akhtar Qayyum.

Panchi
No.	Title	Length
1.	"Panchi"	5:38
2.	"Mayusee"	6:26
3.	"Kahani"	5:01
4.	"Sahil"	5:51
5.	"Ishq"	4:56
6.	"Murshid"	5:41
7.	"Tu Kareeb Hai"	5:26
8.	"Agay Barho"	5:09
9.	"Nami"	5:27
Total length:		49:39

== Personnel ==
All information is taken from the CD.

Mizraab

- Faraz Anwar – lead vocals, lead guitar
- Akhtar Qayyum – percussion, backing vocals
- Khalid Khan – bass, backing vocals

Additional musicians

- Irfan Ahmad – drums
- Jamal Mustafa – rhythm guitar

Production

- Produced by Faraz Anwar
- Recorded & Mixed in Karachi, Pakistan
