= Music of South Asia =

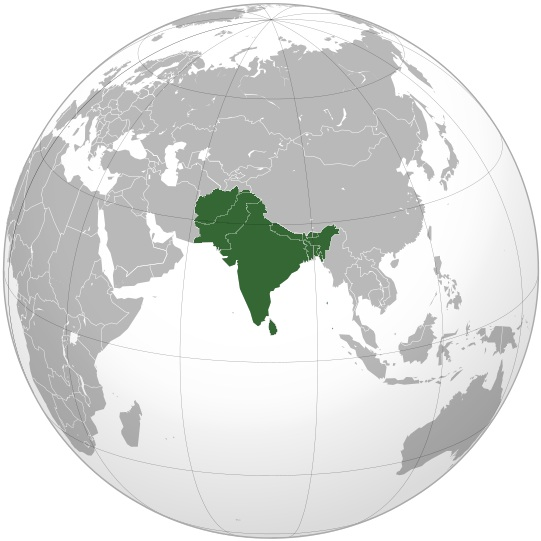
Location of South Asia.

South Asian music comprises a range of prominent musical genres and styles that are unique to the countries in and around the Indian subcontinent. This subregion of Asia includes countries such as India, Afghanistan, Bangladesh, Bhutan, Maldives, Nepal, Pakistan, and Sri Lanka, with each region one possessing its own distinct musical traditions. South Asian styles of music reflect a diverse range of local customs, regional languages and historical traditions, that have shaped the musical practices which are still seen today. Throughout history, South Asian musicians have emulated religious and spiritual beliefs into their compositions, resulting in the creation of musical styles such as Qawwali, Ghazal and Hindustani classical music. The development of forms of mass media in the 1980s and 1990s contributed to a new type of South Asian musical culture, as the rise of cinema and television resulted in the popularity of genres such as Bollywood and Lollywood. As a result of social media and modern streaming networks, folk and ritual music styles are still widely appreciated today, with many modern artists taking inspiration from the classical traditions that defined the history of South Asian music.

== Classical music ==
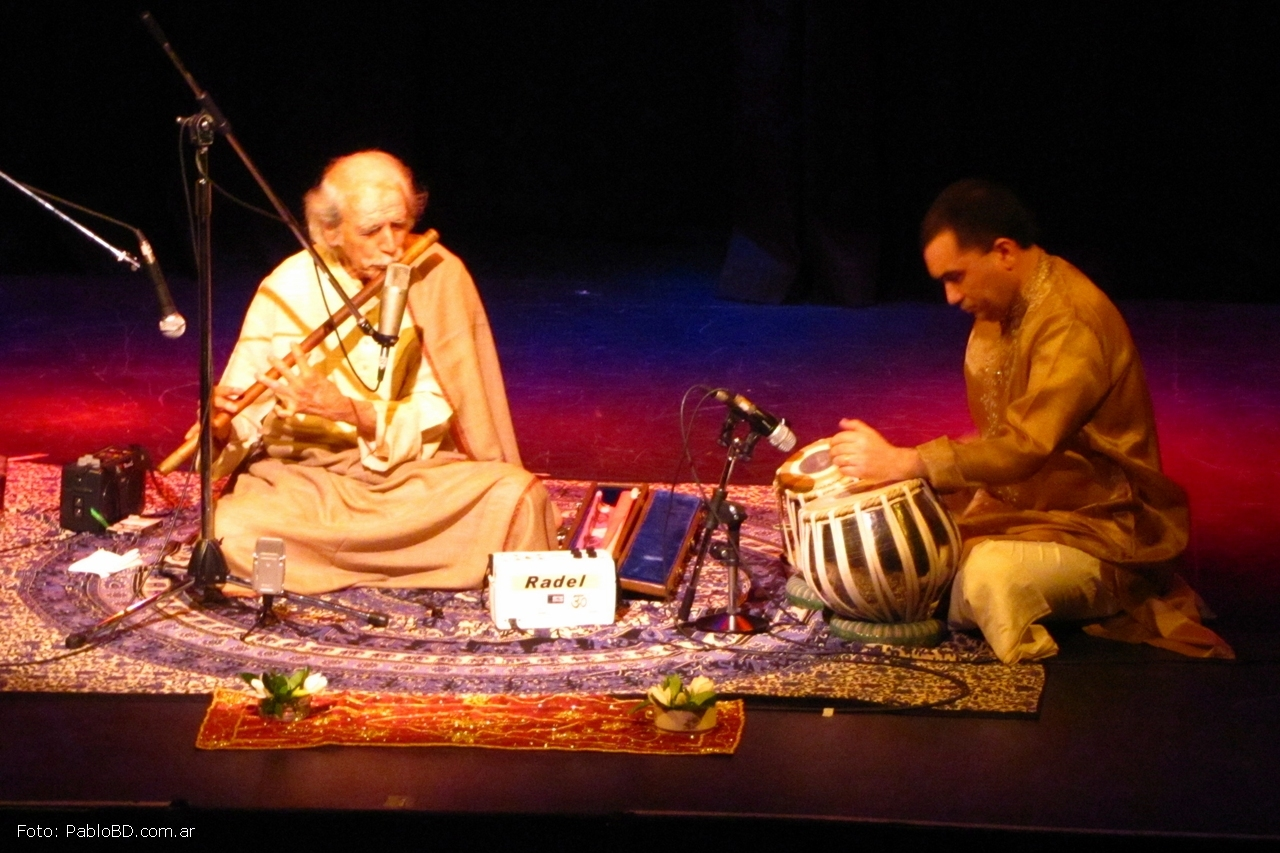
A classical Indian music performance

=== Hindustani classical music and carnatic classical music ===
The foundations of South Asian classical music can be traced back to forms of Vedic literature, based on ancient Sanskrit scriptures and religious texts that were vital to Hinduism in India. The scriptures were significant in the creation of two broad categories of classical music in South Asia, Hindustani classical music and Carnatic classical music. Hindustani classical music is commonly listened to in areas such as Northern India, Afghanistan, Bangladesh and Pakistan, and includes some influences from Arabic and Persian music. On the other hand, Carnatic classical music is more popular in regions such as South India and Sri Lanka, and consists of ancient religious and spiritual hymns that take close inspiration from Vedic literature. This style of music developed mostly independent of Islamic and Persian influences and is regarded as being closer to the ancient roots of the Vedas. There are also many other types of classical music that are less focused on Sanskrit scriptures, and are prominent in areas such as Nepal, Kashmir, Afghanistan and northeastern India, for example Sufi music and Klasik.

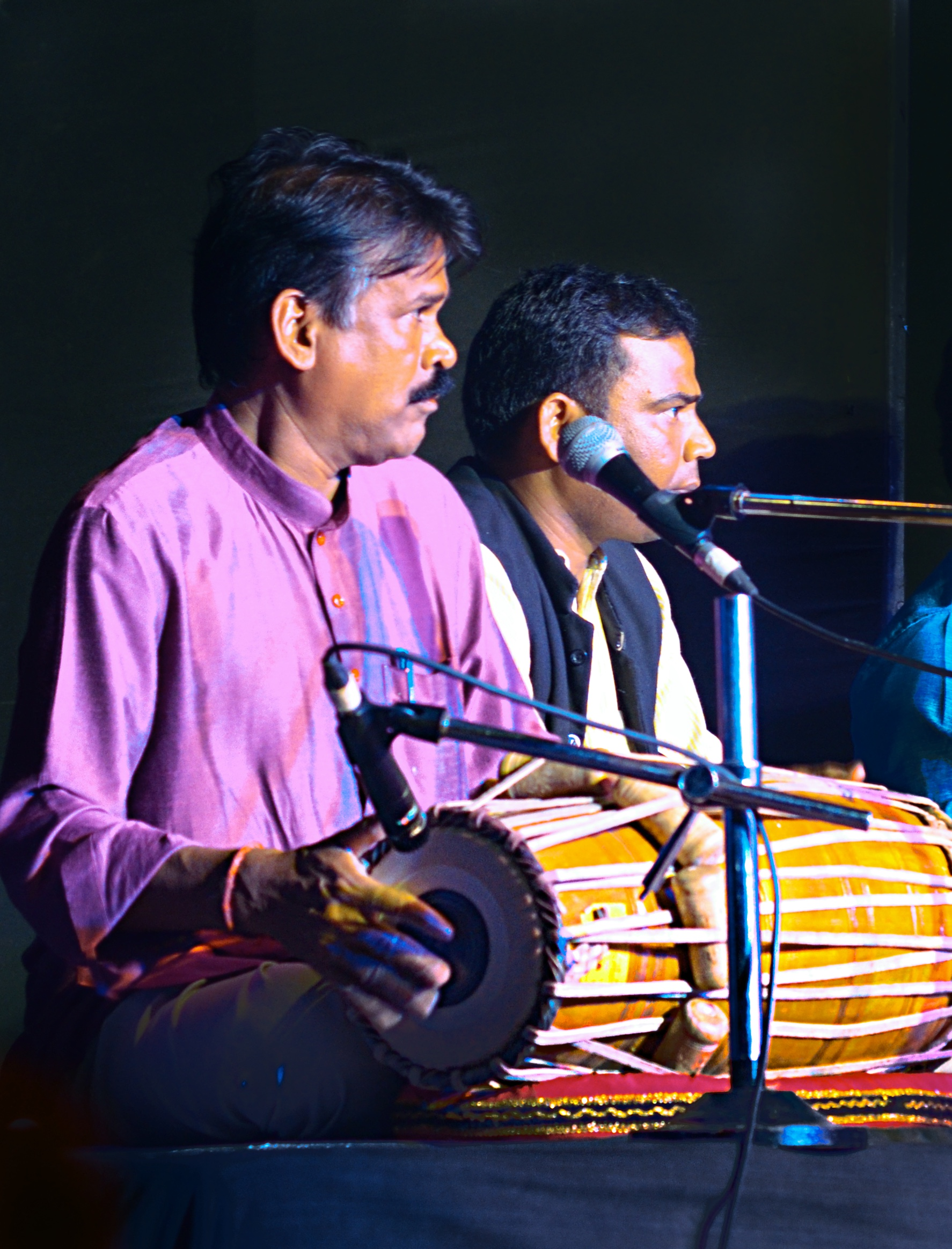
Classical Musician Guru Bijaya Kumar Barik playing the Odissi Mardala

=== Sufi music ===
Sufi poetry and literature based on Islamic principles gave rise to forms of Sufi music that are still prominent throughout Afghanistan, Pakistan and north India. Historically, some types of Sufi music were based on the practice of 'sama', which views the recitation of music as a form of spiritual ecstasy and a pathway to being closer to religion. Qawwali is one of the most prominent forms of Sufi music, and consists of rich poetry and melodious vocals that are commonly performed in languages such as Persian, Urdu and Punjabi. In the past, Qawwalis were often performed in a shrine setting, with the singers and audiences seated in a circular or rectangular arrangement, and listeners responding to the devotional music with gifts of money or other ritual offerings. Following the 1970s and 1980s, Qawwali became well known as a concert genre, with artists such as the Sabri Brothers and Nusrat Fateh Ali Khan gaining immense success and worldwide popularity.

=== Raga and the tala ===
South Asian classical music is generally based on two core principals: the raga and the tala. A raga refers to the melodic structure used by musicians to compose and perform a song. These melodies include certain notes, tones and rhythms that are put together by the musician to display emotions through their compositions. A tala, refers to the musical meter that is used in a song, or the beat used to measure time in music. Historically, the tala was often created through physical gestures such as hand clapping or beating the hand against a drum, or directly by using percussion instruments.

== Influences ==
=== Religious ===
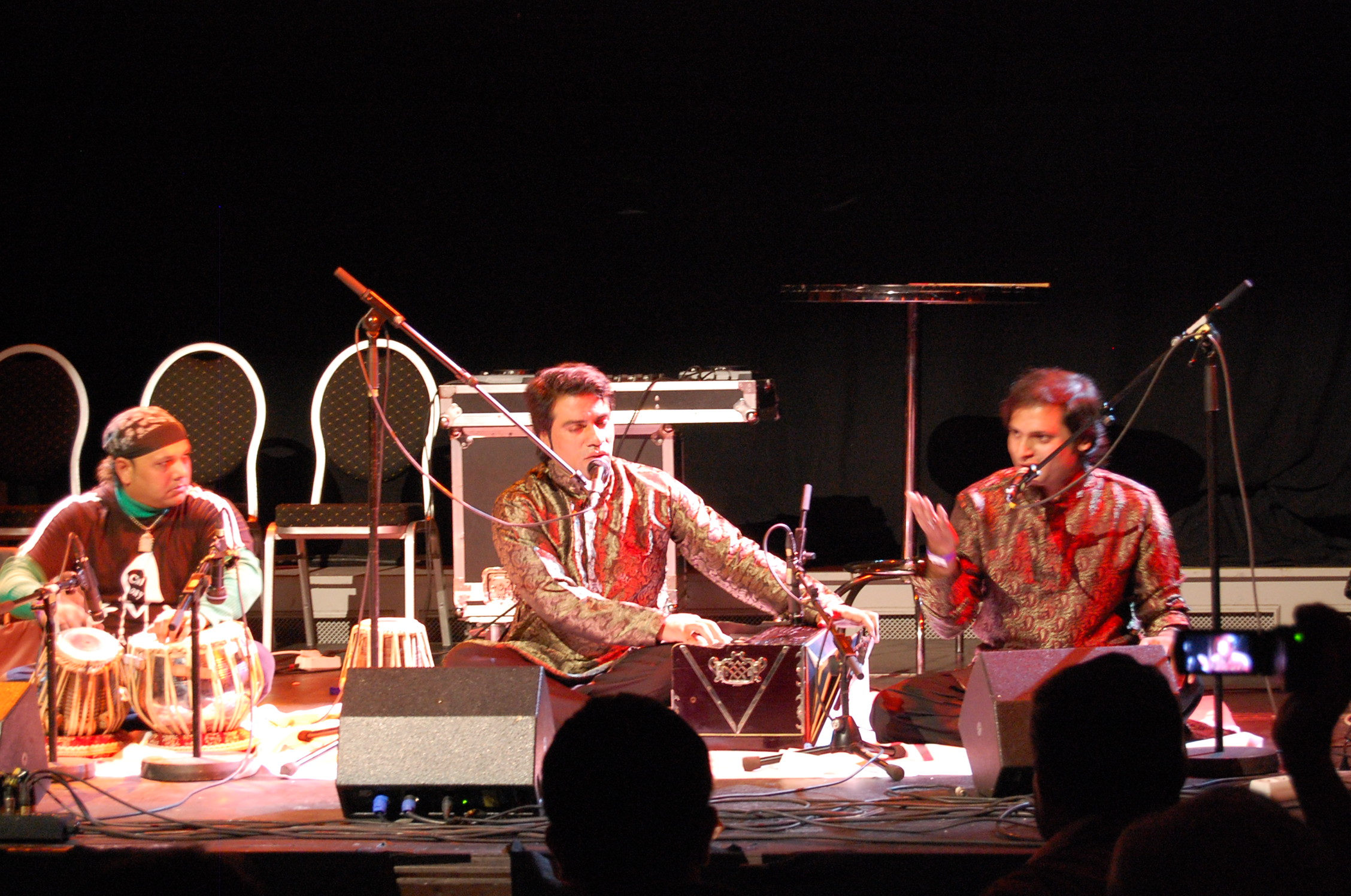
The Qawwali singer Javed Bashir on stage in Oslo

Music and faith have a strong relationship in many of the prominent religions in South Asia, including Hinduism, Buddhism and Islam. In many South Asian cultures, music has been viewed as a uniting force that has helped in resolving conflicts between religious sects, and a pathway for intensifying prayer and worship. In Islam and Hinduism, religious music is not just limited to genres such as Qawwali, but also includes the generation of loud sounds to unite people in prayer, for example Hindu temple music or the Adhan (call to prayer) in Islam. Sacred music in South Asia is closely related to religious rituals, as Hindu temples and Buddhist monasteries are often used as gathering spaces to recite spiritual hymns and chants. Apart from Qawwali, there are many other forms of devotional music that are significant in South Asia. For example, Hindus perform Bhajan as a part of their religious ceremonies, while in Sikhism, Kirtan is used as a practice for reciting religious texts.

=== Cultural ===
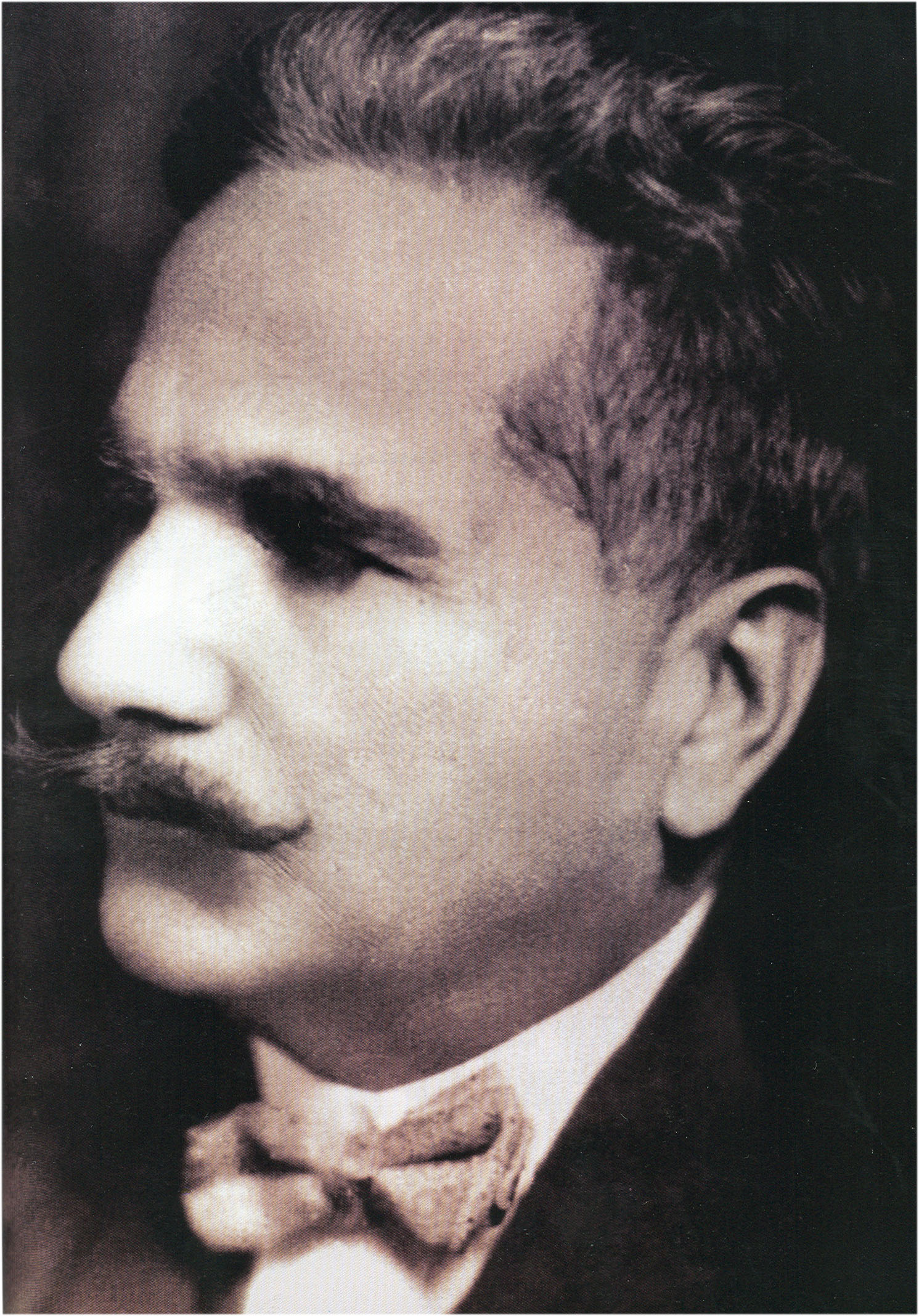
South Asian Muslim poet, Allama Iqbal

With different South Asian countries having their own distinct languages and societal structures, cultural traditions have become deeply intertwined with musical practices. The origin of culturally-distinct musical styles dates back to the Indus Valley Civilisation, with several bow-shaped harps and drums being found, carved within the steatite seals that were recovered from the region. Today, music has become a unique form of expression within different cultural groups and social systems in India. In rural villages in north India, songs are passed down generationally, and are often used in relation to agriculture to display gratitude for a successful harvest. Furthermore, many culturally-specific music genres in India take inspiration from significant social events or historical figures. For example, in Karnatak music, the experiences of M.S. Subbulakshmi which reflected the struggles faced by Indian women in public spaces resulted in her becoming a national emblem of a distinct style of traditional music culture. In the United Kingdom, the arts organisation KalaSudha has organised the Kala Festival since 2023, a touring programme presenting South Asian classical music concerts across cities including London, Reading, Cambridge, Maidenhead, Norwich and Dartington.

=== Political ===
In many South Asian countries, music is often used as a tool to amass wide-scale support for particular political ideologies or notions, or as a form of promoting the messages of political groups and organizations. One of the first prominent forms of political music in Pakistan was Allama Iqbal's Shikwa (grand complaint), a controversial series of poems that criticized God for not fulfilling the obligation of protecting the followers of Islam. Similarly, the Vande Mataram was originally written as an Indian political protest song against their British colonizers, and was used to rally anti-English sentiments across the subcontinent. Many modern musicians still utilize music as a way to convey political messages. For example, in 2016, the Indian rock band 'Motorcycle Shayaries' used their song 'Holi Hai', as a protest song to criticize several aspects of traditional Indian culture.

== Early pioneers ==
=== Classical ===
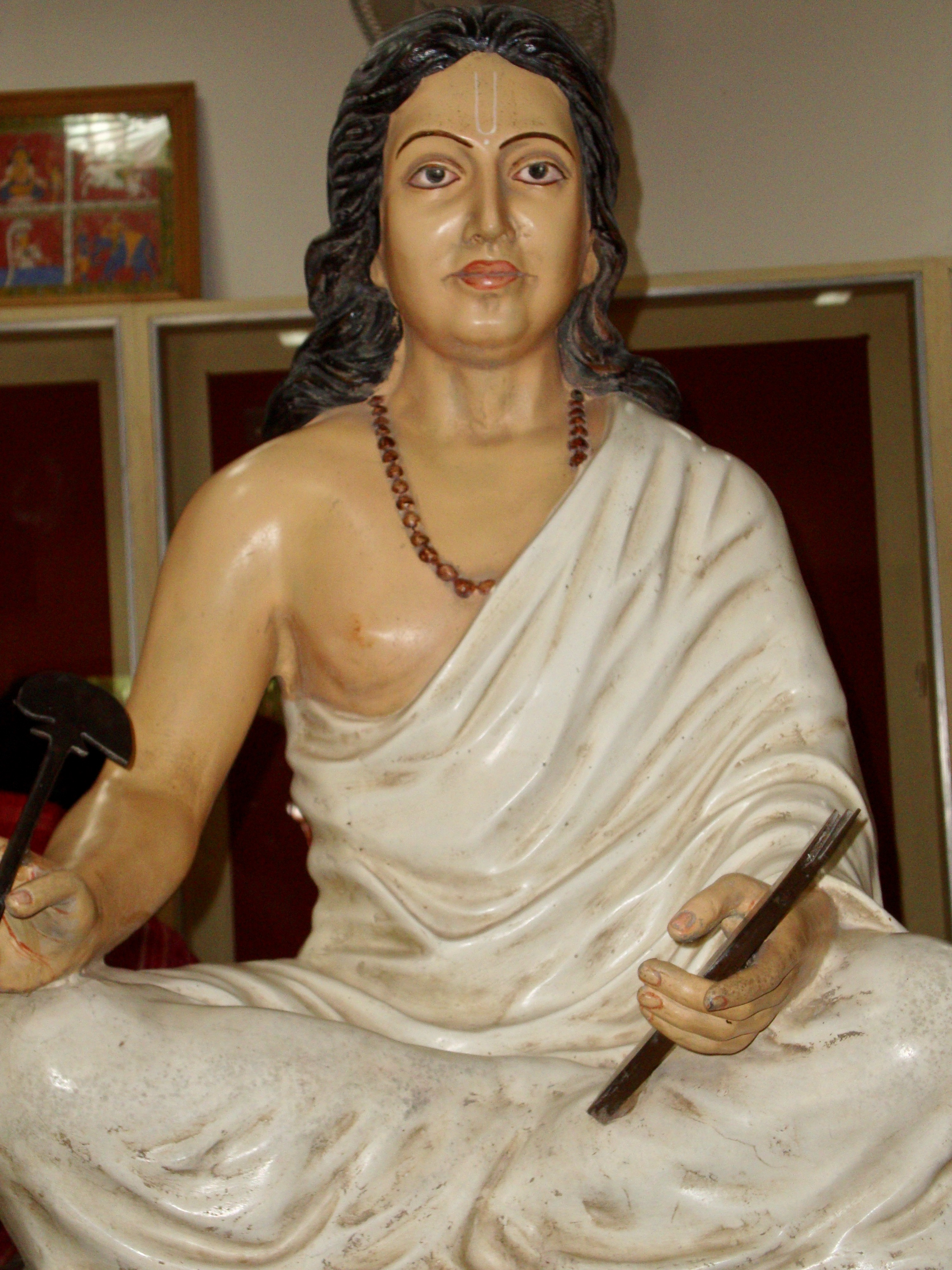
Statue of Indian poet Jayadeva in Odisha, India

Jayadeva from the Odisha region, who lived around the time period of 1100 A.D., is one of the earliest pioneers of Indian classical music. He was a poet most known for writing the “Gītagovinda,” and gave his poems a musical quality through the principles of raga and tala. His work was representative of Hindu devotional poems and he continues to be honored at religious festivals today.

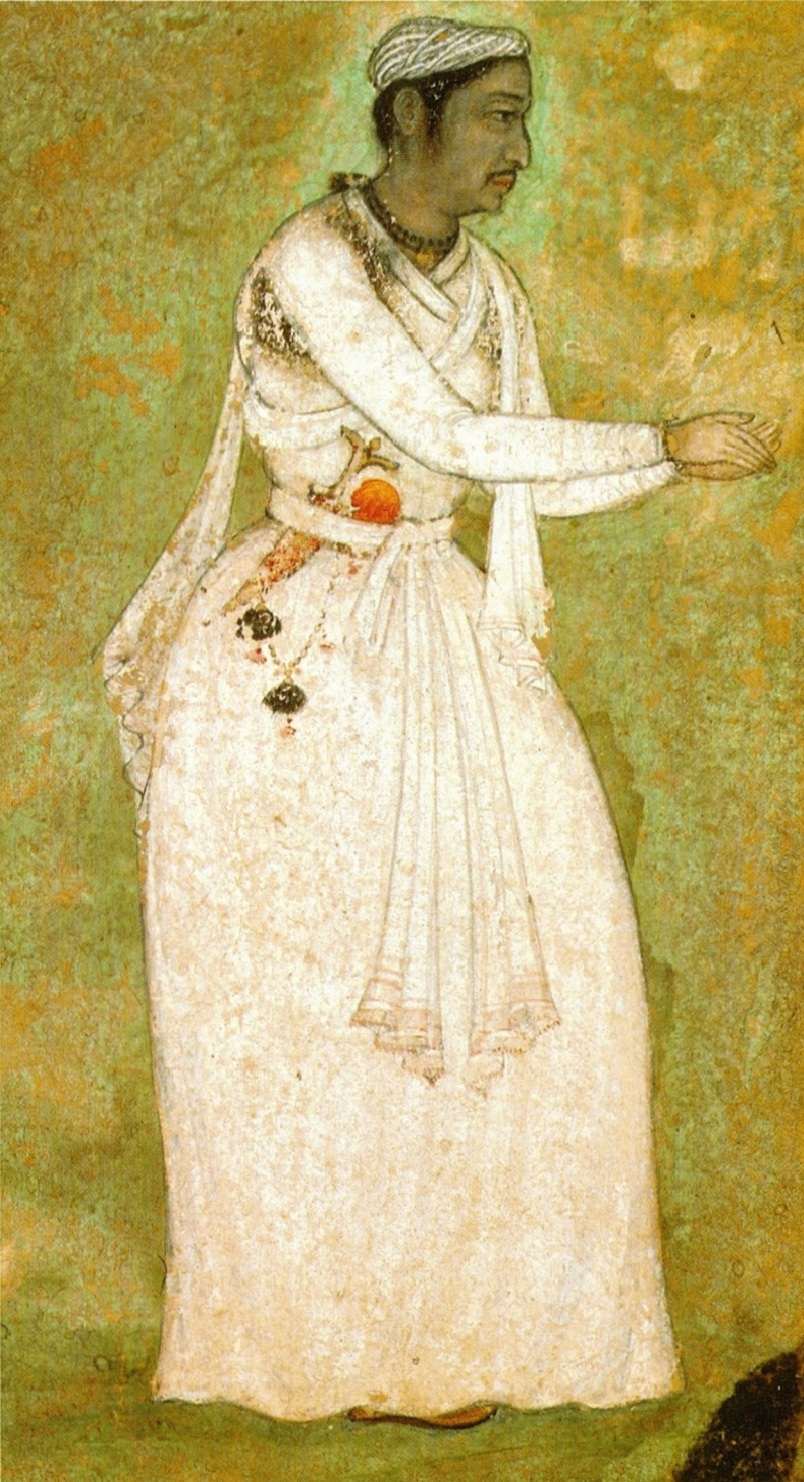
Portrait of Tansen from the National Museum in New Delhi, India

Ramtanu Pandey, also known as Tansen, changed classical North Indian music by blending ancient Indian styles with Persian and Arabian influences. He was from the modern-day Madhya Pradesh region of India around 1500. As a musician, Tansen created new ragas such as Darbadri Todi and Mian-ki-Mallar. He may have created the new instrument known as the rabāb, but this is most likely untrue with little evidence to support this.

Abu’l Hasan Yamīn ud-Dīn Khusrau, or Amīr Khusrau (1295-1316 A.D.), was a poet and musician born in the modern-day Uttar Pradesh region of India. He influenced Indian music by creating new ragas such as Hāfī and Iman and changed Indian classical instrument use by making changes to the vina to create the sitar. He also changed Islamic music with the new Qawwali singing style.

=== Modern ===
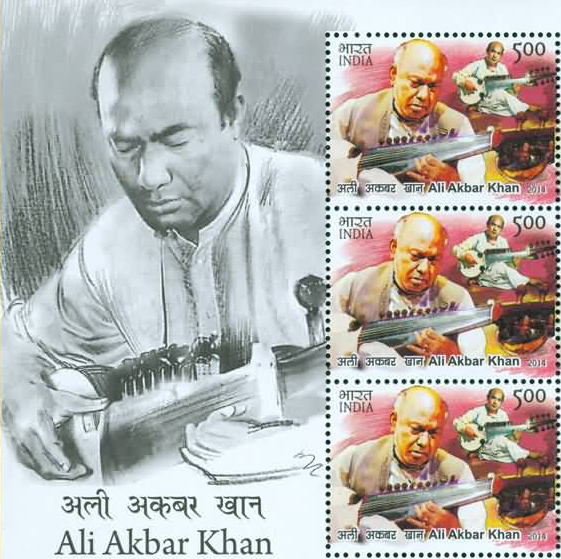
Indian Musician Ali Akbar Khan, pictured on Indian stamps, 2014

Ali Akbar Khan (April 14, 1922 - June 18, 2009) was born in Bengal presidency, British India and was a composer recognized for his music on the sarod. He popularized Indian classical music by bringing it to the West and was recognized for his contributions to music with a MacArthur Foundation fellowship in 1991. He also composed music for cinema, such as for Devi (1960).

Ravi Shankar (April 7, 1920 - December 7, 2012) was a musician and composer from Varanasi, India (previously known as Benares). He was known for his music on the sitar and also helped to bring Indian classical music to the West by collaborating with popular Western artists Yehudi Menuhin, George Harrison, John Coltrane, and Philip Glass. He also composed for the Apu film series (1955-1969). He was recognized with Grammy Awards for his West Meets East (1966) album and the Praemium Imperiale music award in 1997. His children are all associated with music and his daughters Anoushka Shankar and Norah Jones are also Grammy Award recipients.

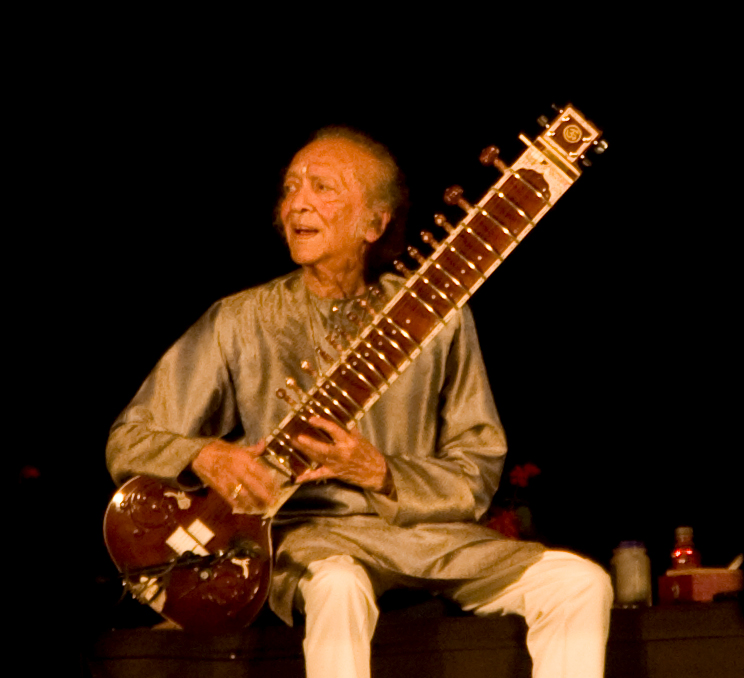
Ravi Shankar with sitar, 2009

== Popular instruments ==
Name Of Instrument	Description	Image
Tabla	Percussion instrument set of 2 separate drums. The two drums are called Bayan (left hand) and Dayan (right hand).	Tabla, an Indian instrument
Sitar	Stringed instrument similar to Tambūra. Made of a goard attached to a fingerboard. The fingerboard has 9-16 frets, 7 main strings, and 11-12 strings that are parallel to the main strings under the frets.	Sitar, Indian instrument
Tambūra	Stringed instrument similar to the Veena, without the second goard. The 4 strings are played by hand with plucking motions.	Tambūra or Tamburi, Indian instrument
Sarod	Stringed instrument similar to the Sitar but without frets. Made of a double body and fingerboard with 6 main strings and 11-12 other strings. Played by holding the instrument horizontally on the lap and with a plectrum held in one hand to pluck the strings.	Sarod, Indian instrument
Veena	Stringed instrument made of a main body attached to a smaller gourd. There are 24 frets, 4 main strings, and 3 other strings. Played by holding the instrument with the small gourd on the left thigh, left arm under the neck with fingers on frets, and using plucking motions.	Veena, Indian instrument
Shehnai	Woodwind instrument similar to an oboe. It has a metal bell at the end. On the body, there are 8-9 holes and a reed at top.	Shehnai, Indian instrument
Sarangi	Stringed instrument similar to a cello. There are 4 strings attached that can be adjusted with knobs. Played with a bow by holding the instrument in the left hand and using the bow with the right hand, and while standing.	Sarangi, instrument used in Indian, Nepali, Pakistani, and Bangladeshi music
Harmonium	Percussion instrument. Played by using one hand to play the keyboard and one hand to pump the bellows in the back.	Harmonium, instrument used in classical Indian, Sufi, and Ghazal music
Dhol	Percussion instrument made of a two-sided drum. Played with the use of two bamboo sticks, one heavier for one side and one lighter for the other. Commonly used in bhangra style music and performance.	Dhol, Indian instrument

== See also ==
- Music of Afghanistan
- Music of Bangladesh
- Music of Bhutan
- Music of India
- Music of the Maldives
- Music of Nepal
- Music of Pakistan
- Music of Sri Lanka
- Asian Underground
- Ravanahatha
