= Faraz Anwar =

Pakistani guitarist

- Born: 15 July 1976 (age 50); Karachi, Sindh, Pakistan
- Genres: Rock music, hard rock, heavy metal, speed metal, progressive rock
- Occupation: Instrumental guitarist
- Instrument: Guitar: Electric/Acoustic
- Years active: 1996 – present
- Labels: Fire Records, Coke Studio, EMI Records, Lion Music, Gnarly Geezer, Inc., NTM Studios, Off Axis Records
- Website: www.farazanwar.com

Faraz Anwar (Urdu: فراز انور; born 15 July 1976) is a Pakistani musician, composer, singer-songwriter, bandleader, and guitarist who founded the Mizraab, a heavy metal music and hard rock genre band based in Pakistan.

On account of his musical act on electric guitar, one critic referred to him as "Pakistan's master of progressive rock". Anwar is currently signed to Lion Music, a Finnish production and record label company.

== Biography ==
Faraz Anwar started learning to play the guitar at the age of 14. He was inspired by the British jazz musician Allan Holdsworth and the American guitarist Paul Gilbert. Faraz Anwar's latest album, Ishq Ki Subah, a 15-track fusion of pop, rock, and progressive songs and instrumentals, was released in 2020. Additionally, his concept album, Tale of The Lunatics, narrating the story of the angel Afaiel sent to earth as a human, can be found on all major online music distribution platforms.

== Coke Studio (Pakistan) featured artist ==
He has made several appearances on Coke Studio Pakistan. Faraz Anwar was a featured artist musician on Coke Studio Pakistan season 10 in 2017.

== Solo discography ==
- 2001: Abstract Point of View
- 2020: Ishq Ki Subah
- 2021: Another Brick in the Wall
- 2022: Tale Of The Lunatics

== Discography ==
=== With Mizraab ===
- Panchi (1999)
- Maazi, Haal, Mustaqbil (2004)

=== Solo albums ===
- Abstract Point of View (2001)
- Ishq Ki Subah (2020)
- Tale Of The Lunatics (2022)
- The First One (2025)

=== Live albums ===
- Live at the Rock Musicarium (with Noori) (2012)
