= Behar (disambiguation) =

Behar is the 32nd weekly parshah or portion in the annual Jewish cycle of Torah reading.

Behar may also refer to:

== Places ==
- Bihar, a state in India
- Cooch Behar, a town in West Bengal, India and the former capital of Koch Bihar
- Cooch Behar district, a district in West Bengal, India

== People ==
- Behar (surname)

== Other ==
- Behar (magazine), Bosnian political journal published from 1900 to 1911
- Fischer, Behar, Chen, Well, Orion & Co., one of the largest law firms in Israel

== See also ==
- Behari, a given name
- Bihar (disambiguation)
- Bejar (disambiguation)
- Cooch Behar (disambiguation)
- Bahar (disambiguation)
- Bexar (disambiguation)
- Bezoar
- Vehari (disambiguation)
