= Bahari =

Bahari may refer to:

- Bahari, Sidhi, Tehsil in Sidhi District
- Ali-Asghar Bahari (1905–1995), Iranian musician
- Bahari, Bangladesh
- Maziar Bahari (born 1967), Iranian-Canadian journalist, filmmaker, and playwright
- Bahari (band), an American female alt pop and electronic duo

== See also ==
- Bahar (disambiguation)
- Behari (disambiguation)
- Bahariyeh (disambiguation)
