= Behar (surname) =

Behar or Bahar is a surname of Sephardic Jewish origin, thought to be an abbreviation of ben kavod rabbi, Hebrew for "a son of the honorable rabbi". Notable people with the surname include:

- Abdellah Béhar (born 1963), Moroccan-born French runner
- Adriana Behar (born 1969), Brazilian volleyball athlete
- Ariel Behar (born 1989), Uruguayan tennis player
- Howard Behar, Former President of Starbucks
- Joy Behar (born 1942), American comedian
- Katherine Behar, American feminist theorist
- Maksim Behar (born 1955), Bulgarian-Israeli businessman
- Richard Behar, American investigative journalist
- Ruth Behar (born 1956), Cuban-American writer and anthropologist
- Sasha Behar (born 1971), British actress
- Yves Béhar (born 1967), Swiss-born industrial designer

== See also ==
- Behar
