= Grand Master Philippe Villiers de l'Isle Adam Taking Possession of Mdina =

Painting by Antoine de Favray

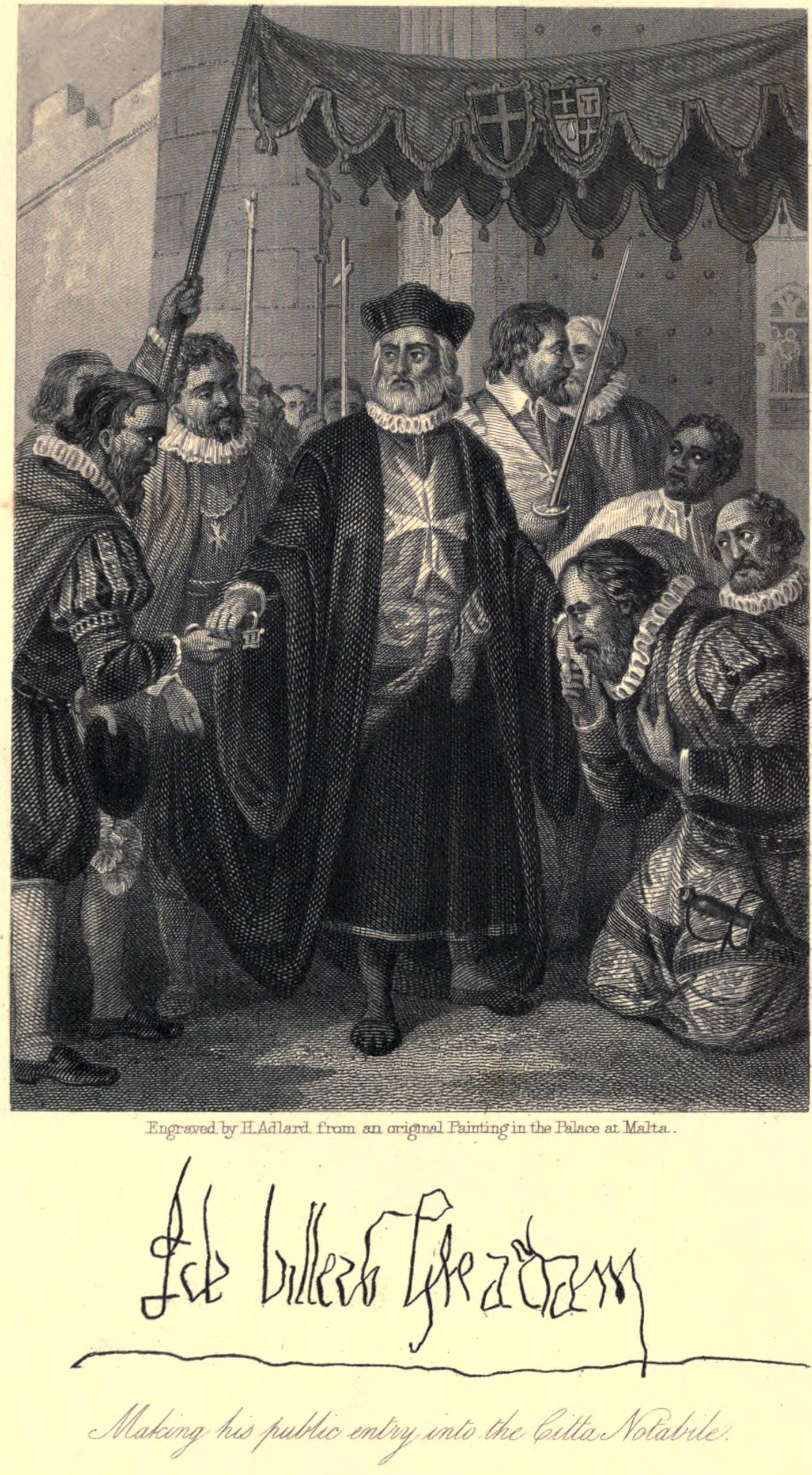
- 19th century engraving of the painting
- Artist: Antoine de Favray
- Year: c. 1750
- Subject: Philippe Villiers de L'Isle-Adam
- Location: Grandmaster's Palace, Valletta, Malta

Grand Master Philippe Villiers de l'Isle Adam Taking Possession of Mdina is a painting by the French artist Antoine de Favray from c. 1750. It depicts Philippe Villiers de L'Isle-Adam, a Grand Master of the Knights Hospitaller, entering the city of Mdina and taking possession of it in a ceremony known as the possesso. The real-life event which is the subject of the painting took place on 13 November 1530, shortly after the establishment of Hospitaller rule in Malta. The painting is an iconic representation of Hospitaller Malta, and it is located within the Grandmaster's Palace in Valletta, Malta.

== The possesso ceremony of 1530 ==
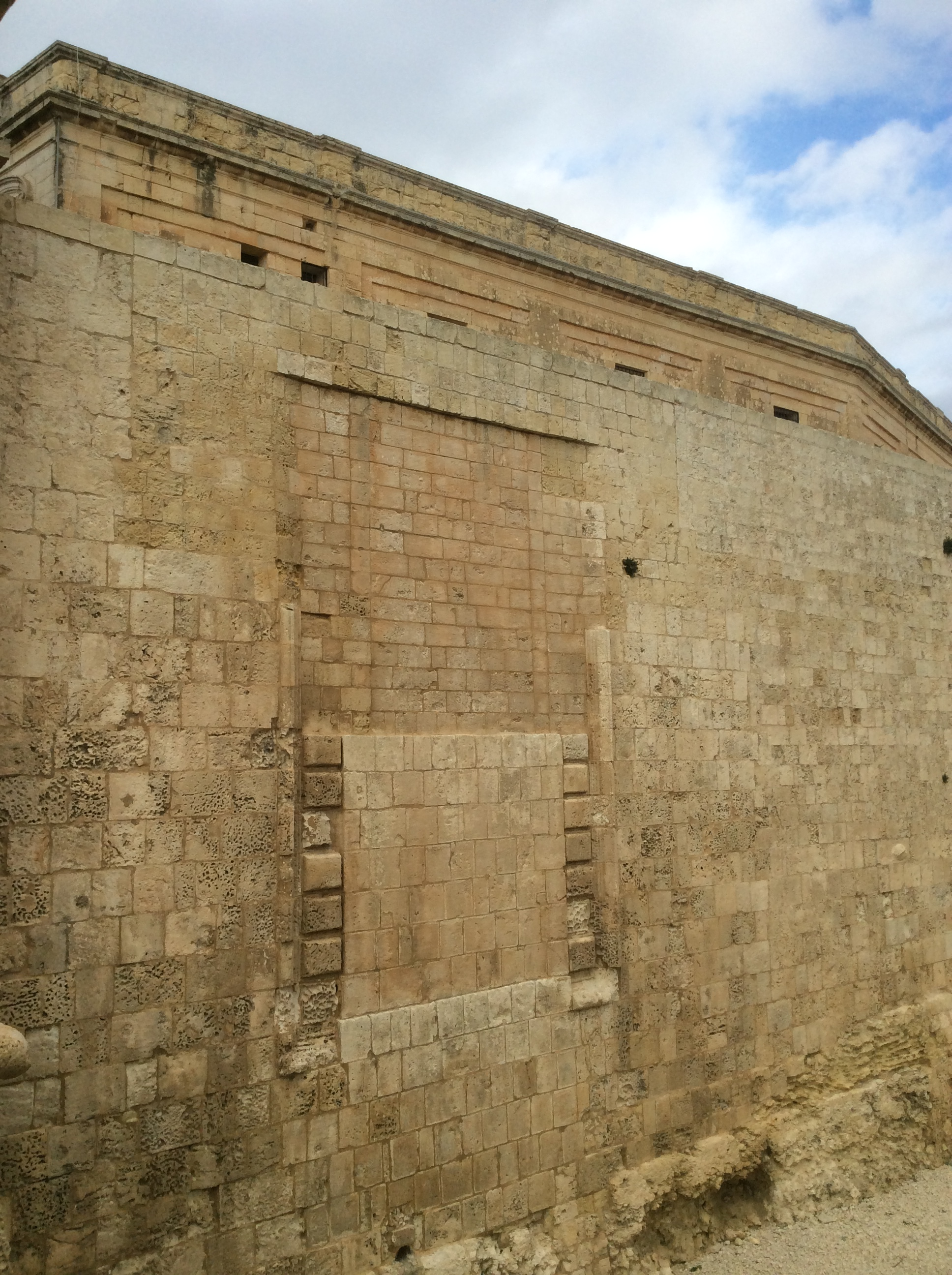
Site of the old entrance to Mdina after it was walled up in the 18th century following the construction of a new gate nearby

In 1530, the Maltese Islands were granted to the Knights Hospitaller by Emperor Charles V (who was also King of Sicily). Shortly after the Hospitallers' arrival on the islands, a ceremony took place in which Grand Master Philippe Villiers de L'Isle-Adam took possession (Italian: possesso) of the medieval capital city of Mdina. This took place on 13 November 1530, and it later became a tradition to organise similar ceremonies upon the election of each new Grand Master.

There was some animosity between the Maltese nobility who were based at Mdina and the Hospitallers, since the latter's takeover of Malta decreased the former's power and influence considerably. The Università, which was a municipal council made up of the nobility of Mdina, organised the possesso ceremony in an attempt to develop better relations with the Hospitallers whilst also showing their own capabilities.

The event included a procession which began at St Augustine's Friary in Rabat and ended at the cathedral of Mdina. The focal point of the ceremony was the granting of the keys of the city to the Grand Master. The Università's act of giving these keys as a gift to the Grand Master was meant to create an obligation for the latter to protect Mdina and the Maltese population. Through accepting the keys, the Grand Master acknowledged the nobility's authority and allegiance.

The 1530 ceremony is known through primary sources such as records from the Università and secondary sources such as Giacomo Bosio's history of the Hospitallers written in 1589. The latter is a detailed account which was probably based on notes from earlier chroniclers, but it likely contains some pro-Hospitaller bias.

== Description ==
The painting depicts the moment when the ceremonial keys of Mdina were being handed over to the Grand Master. L'Isle-Adam is the central figure of the composition, wearing a black garment which prominently displays the Maltese cross. He is shown standing outside the gate of the city, and some of the fortifications are visible in the background. One of the figures standing behind L'Isle-Adam is holding a ceremonial sword, which is an anachronism since it depicts an 18th century weapon rather than one from the 16th century. A red baldachin decorated with the coats of arms of the Order and of L'Isle-Adam is being held over the central figures.

Male members of the Maltese nobility are depicted standing or kneeling around the Grand Master, symbolising the transfer of power from the nobility to the Hospitallers. Some women are shown in the background watching the event taking place. The painting also depicts a man opening the city gate and artillery from the fortifications firing salvos as a salute.

== History ==
The work was painted by Antoine de Favray sometime between 1744 and 1762, probably around 1750. Commissioned by the Hospitallers during the magistracy of Manuel Pinto da Fonseca, the painting is one of a number of works by Favray which illustrate episodes from the Order's history.

Today the painting is located within the Ambassadors' Room of the Grandmaster's Palace in Valletta.

== Legacy ==
In 1938 and 1943, the painting was depicted on 2½d Malta stamps along with a portrait of the then-reigning British monarch George VI. In 1948 and 1953, the stamp design was reissued with Self-Government overprints and it remained in regular use until the mid-1950s. The painting was depicted on another Malta postage stamp in 1999.
