= Antoine de Favray =

French painter (1706–1798)

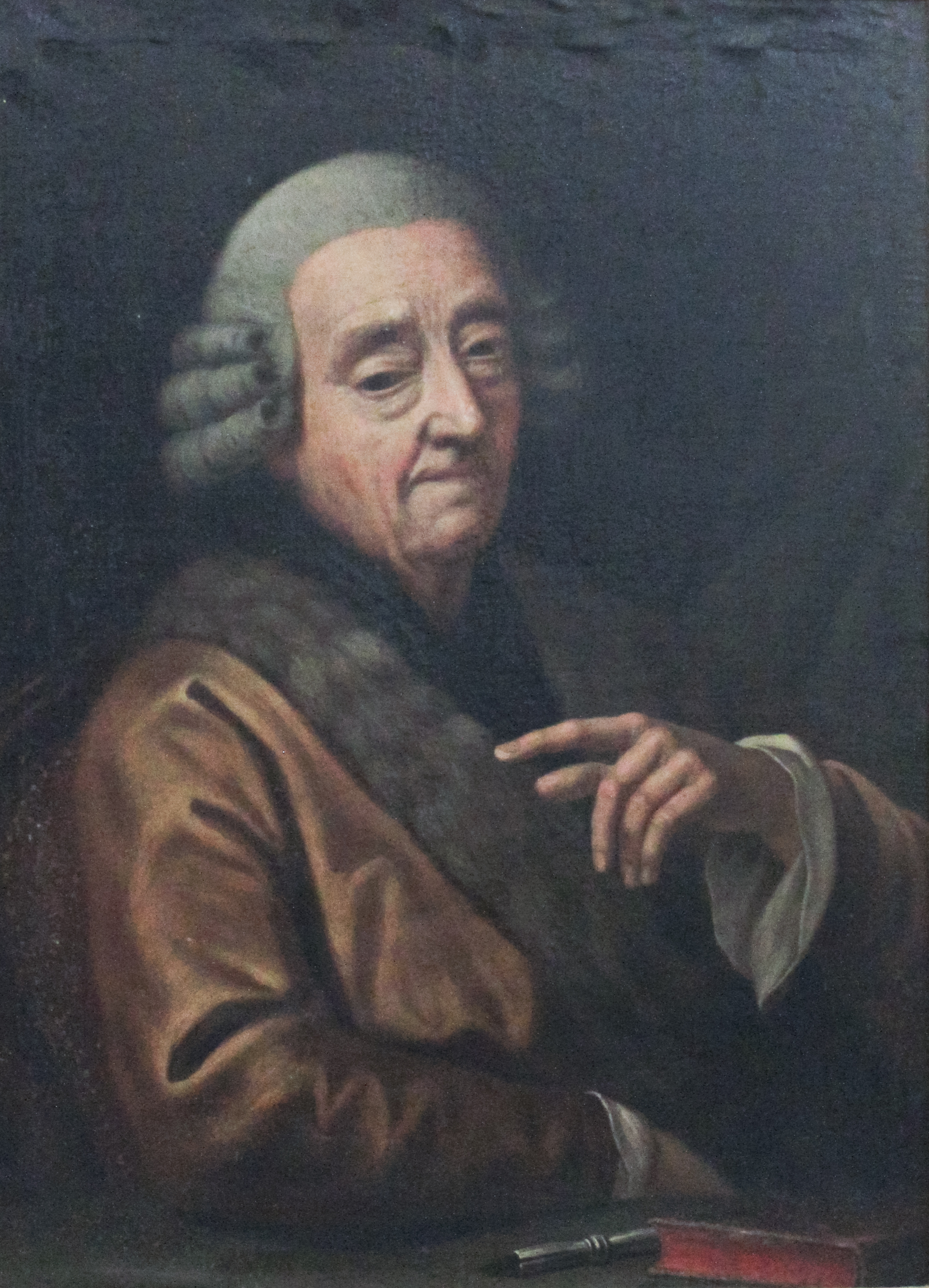
- Antoine Favray, Self-portrait
- Born: 8 September 1706; Bagnolet, France
- Died: 9 February 1798 (aged 91); Malta
- Movement: Orientalist

Chevalier Antoine de Favray (French pronunciation: [ɑ̃twan də favʁɛ]; 8 September 1706, Bagnolet – 9 February 1798, Malta) was a French painter noted for his portraits of personalities of the Ottoman Empire, as well as paintings of Grand Masters of the Sovereign Military Order of Malta.

== Life and career ==
In 1762, Antoine de Favray moved to Constantinople, where he spent nine years. He painted numerous genre scenes of the everyday life in Turkey under Louis XVI, and he also depicted locals and foreign dignitaries. Especially notable are a portrait of French ambassador Charles Gravier, comte de Vergennes (1717-1787), who was living in Constantinople between 1754 and 1768, and a portrait of Gravier's wife Annette Duvivier de Testa (1730-1798). She had previously been married to Testa, a merchand and member of a prominent Genoese family who settled in Pera for several centuries. Favray portrayed both the ambassador and his wife in rich Turkish dress.

== See also ==
- List of Orientalist artists
- Orientalism

== Gallery ==
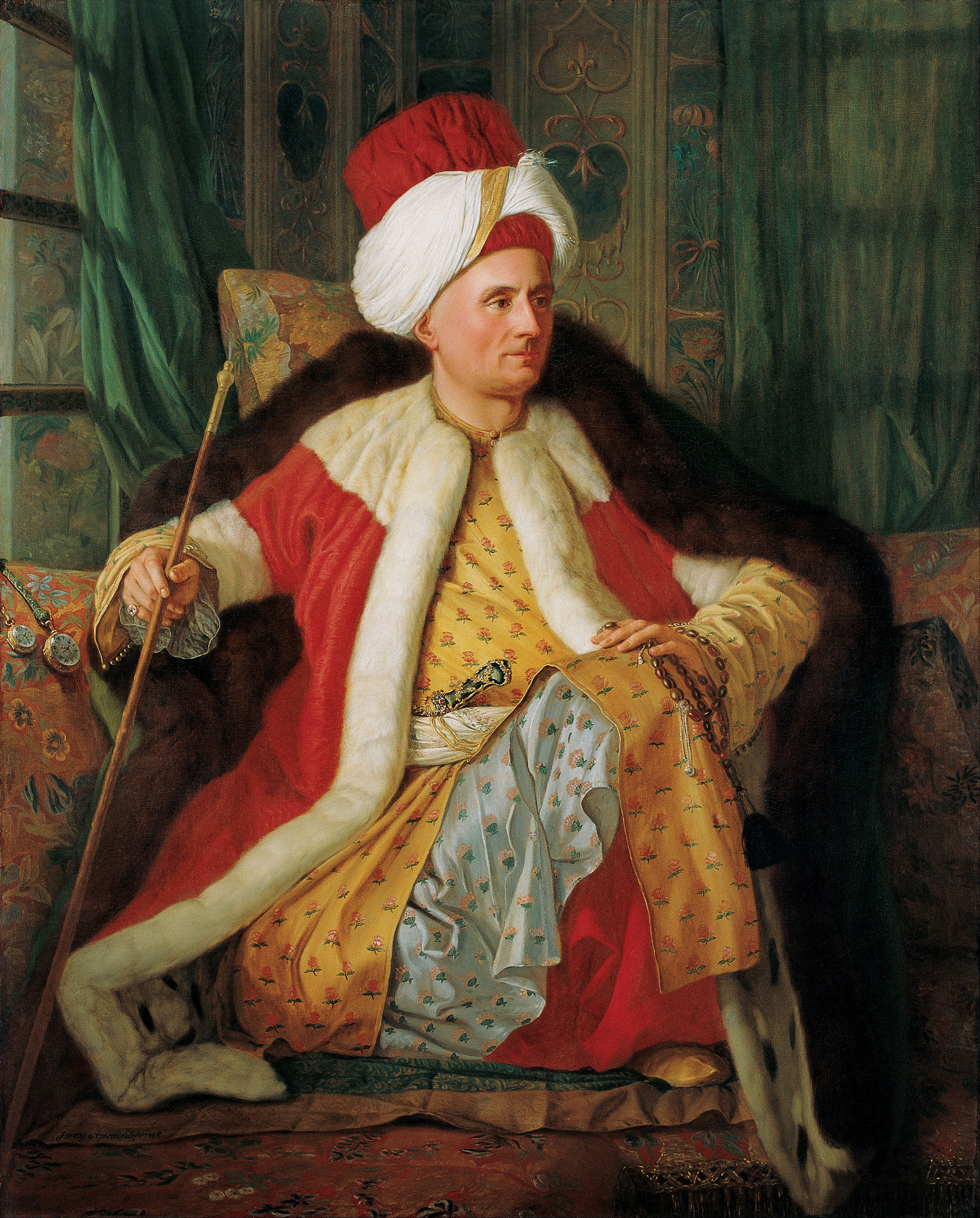
French ambassador Charles Gravier de Vergennes in Ottoman dress, painted by Antoine de Favray, 1766, Pera Museum, Istanbul.

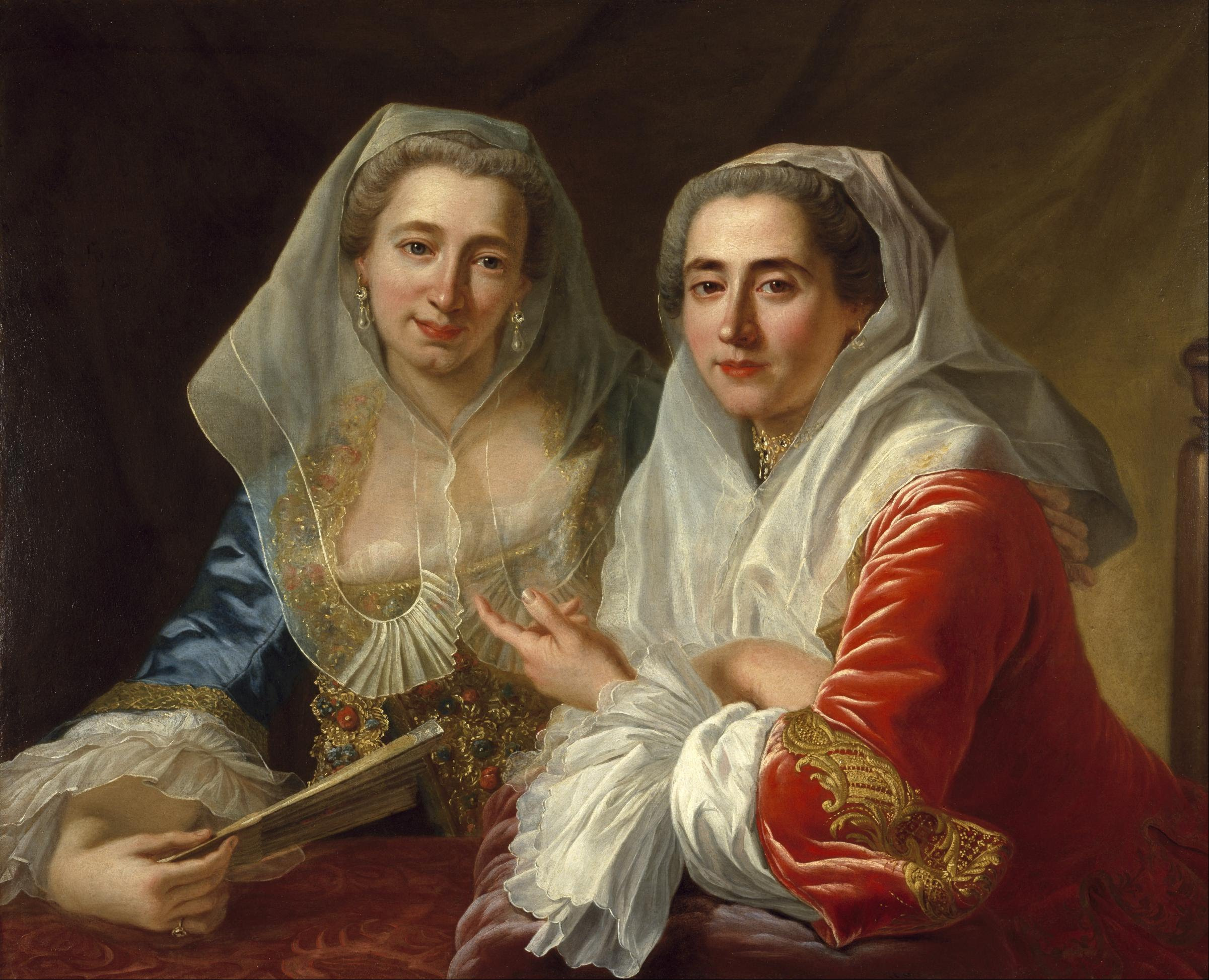
The Mirabita Sisters, Museum of Fine Arts, Houston

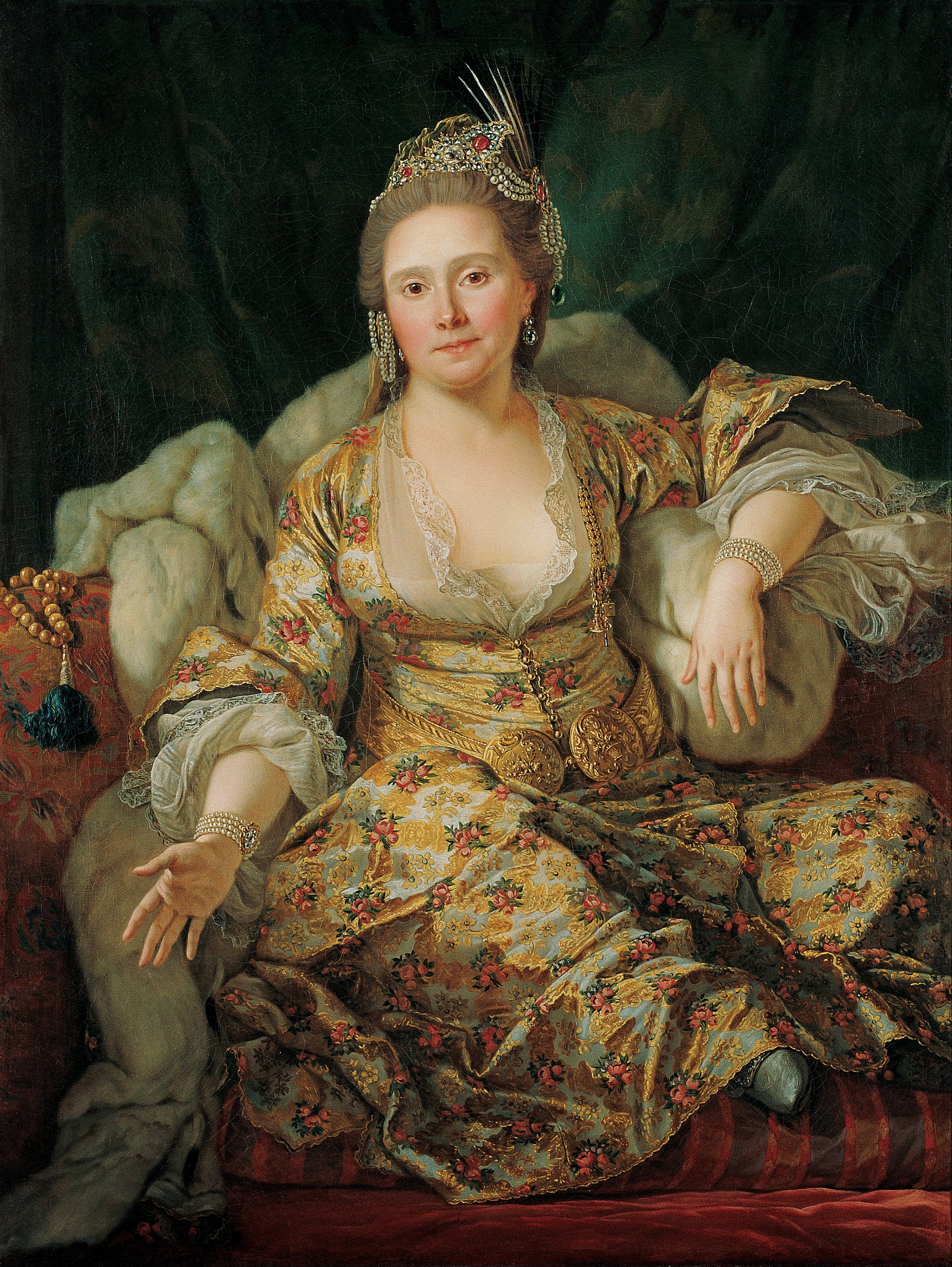
Antoine de Favray - Portrait of the Countess of Vergennes in Turkish Attire, Pera Museum, Istanbul

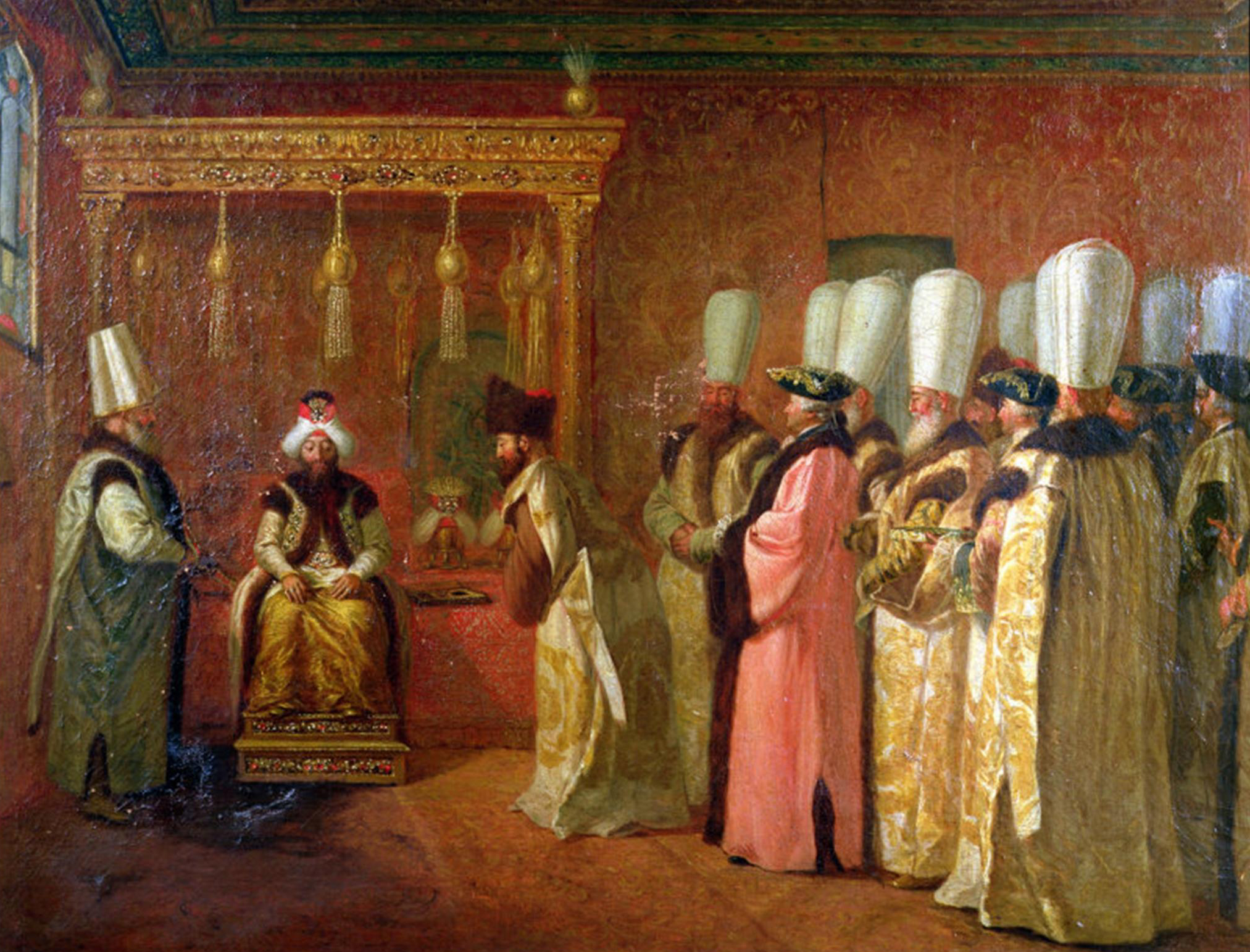
Audience of Charles de Vergennes with Sultan Osman III in 1755.

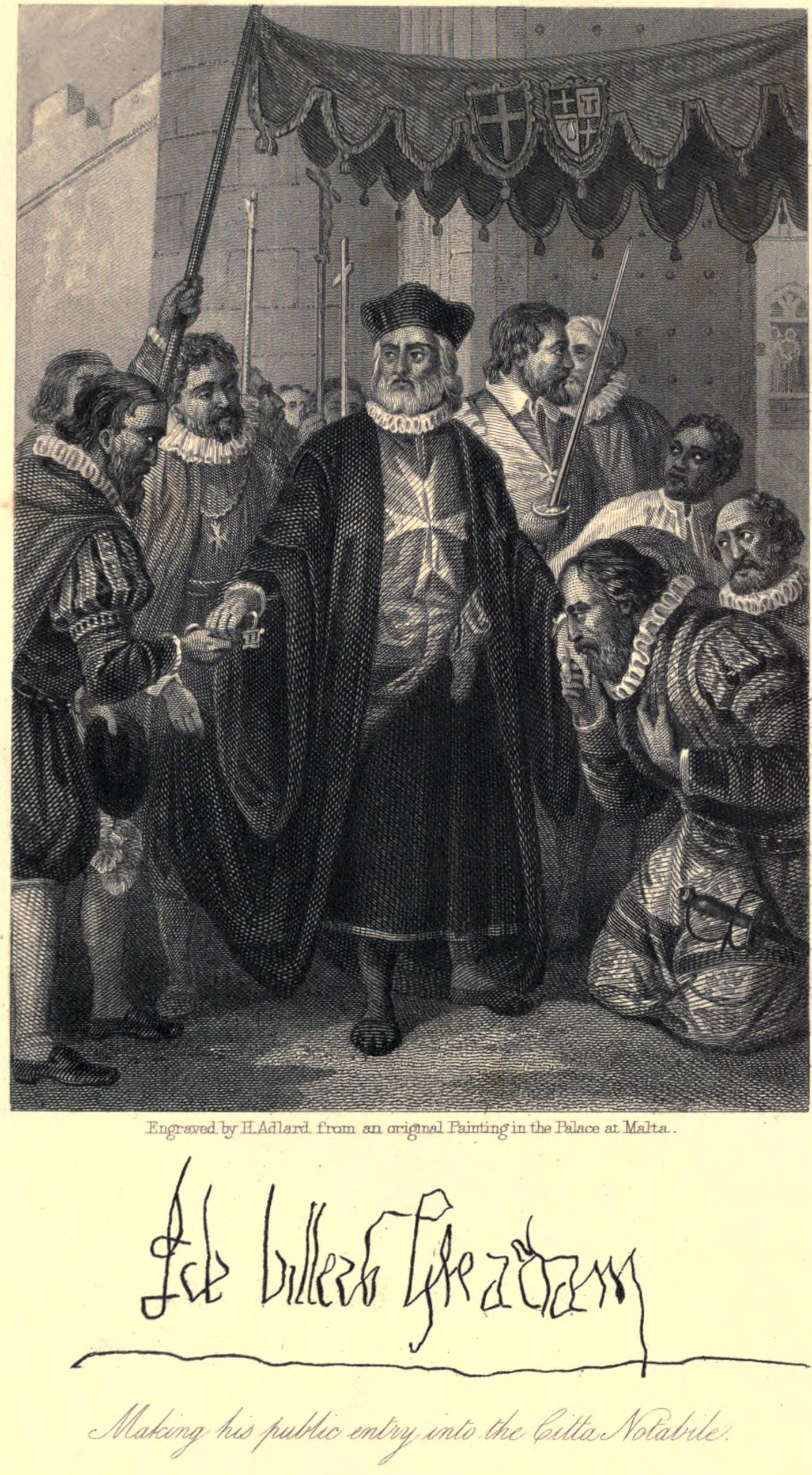
Grand Master Philippe Villiers de l'Isle Adam Taking Possession of Mdina

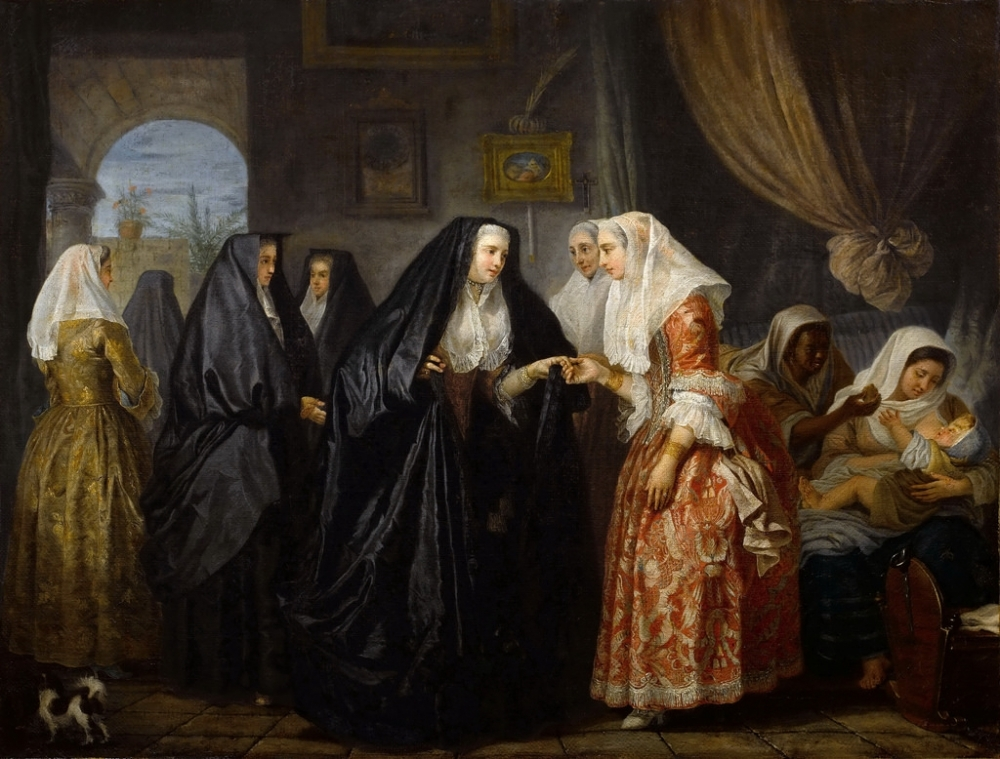
Antoine de Favray - The Visit of Maltese Ladies

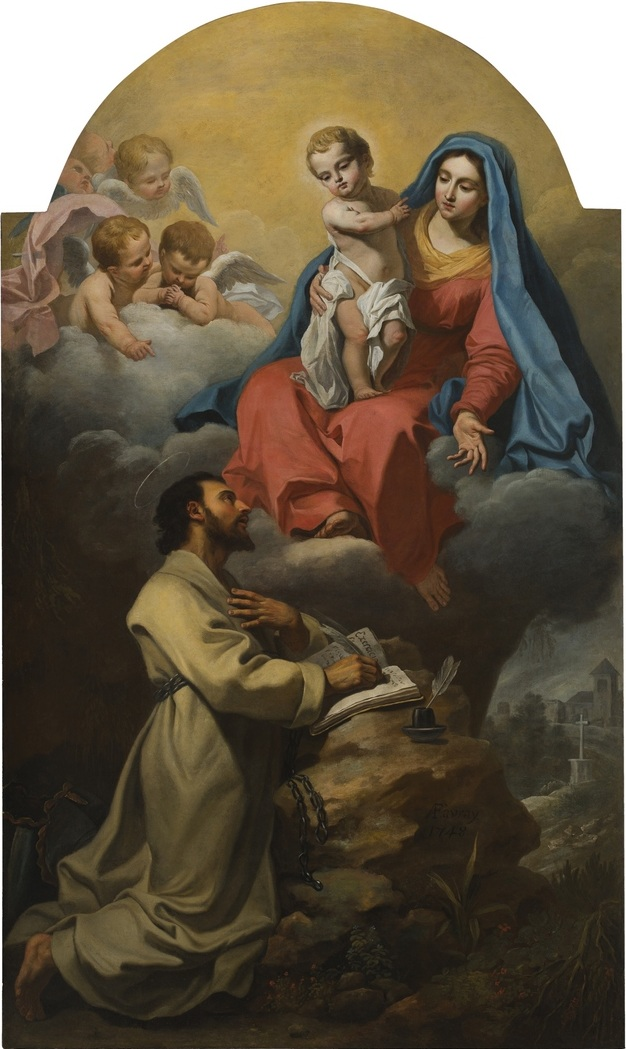
St Ignatius of Loyola writing ‘The Spiritual Exercises’ during his time of discernment in Manresa, under the maternal gaze of the Virgin Mary and her son Jesus by Antoine Favray (1748)
