= Katherine Behar =

American artist

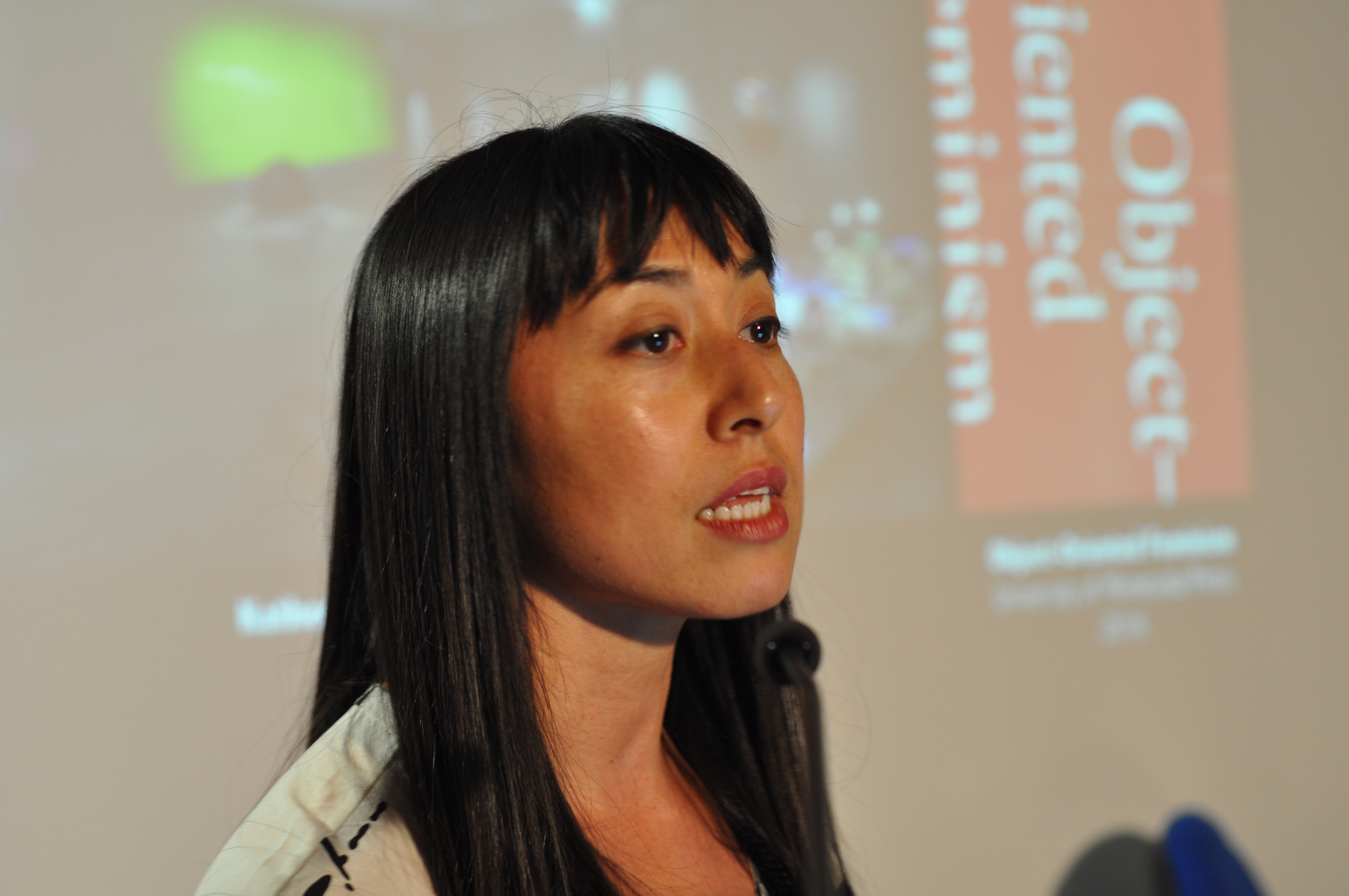
- Education: School of the Art Institute of Chicago, New York University, Hunter College, City University of New York
- Known for: interactive art, installation art, performance art, public art, photography, video art
- Notable work: ‘’Disorientalism’’, ‘’RSI’’
- Movement: new media art, feminist art movement
- Website: www.katherinebehar.com

Katherine Behar is an American new media and performance artist and writer based in Brooklyn, New York. Her work uses materialism and feminism to explore contemporary digital culture and is unified by an approach she calls "object-oriented feminism." Behar's art practice encompasses interactive installation, performance art, public art, and video art. In addition to her artwork, Behar writes on various topics including feminist media theory, technologized labor, and objecthood.

== Life and career ==
Katherine Behar was born in Boston, Massachusetts. She earned her Bachelor of Fine Arts from School of the Art Institute of Chicago in 2000. In 2006, she attained a Master of Arts degree from New York University, and in 2009 received a Master of Fine Arts from Hunter College, City University of New York.

Behar currently lives and works in New York City. She is professor at Baruch College, City University of New York where she heads the New Media Arts undergraduate program and teaches classes in video art and exhibition practices. She runs the New Media Artspace, a teaching exhibition space at Baruch College.

Behar's work was the subject of a solo exhibition at the Beall Center for Art+Technology (2024) as well as a museum survey exhibition at Pera Museum, Istanbul, in 2016. Behar has been honored with residencies and fellowships including The MacDowell Colony, Pioneer Works, Johannesburg Workshop in Theory and Practice, Cannonball, The Wassaic Project, Art Journal Digital Fellow, and 7.stock. She has received a Creative Capital Award and a Franklin Furnace Award.

Behar is also a feminist theorist of technology, and has been particularly influential in developing an approach called "object-oriented feminism." She is additionally known for introducing the concept of "decelerationist aesthetics.”

== Works ==
Behar's art questions how objecthood, gender, race, and labor play out in the digital realm, and often combines sculpture and performance.

New media and performance art scholar Anna Watkins Fisher calls Behar's artwork an "original contribution to the field of new media art." She writes that "Behar's work forces a different kind of interaction between the digital and the aesthetic than what is regularly shown and promoted under the banner of new media art . . . Behar makes new media and performance speak to each other."

Behar's art mixes objecthood and personhood, playing with our understandings of care. For art critic Nathan Sharratt, “Behar’s artwork raises questions about parental responsibility. As we create more and more disposable ‘children,’ what effect will that have on us? On our children?”

=== Anonymous Autonomous ===
Behar’s interactive installation Anonymous Autonomous (2024) consists of three robotic office chairs that have been transformed to behave like driverless cars. Relying on simplified versions of the lidar sensors and computer vision systems used by autonomous vehicles, the chairs roam through the gallery, following paper "lanes" that viewers arrange on the floor. With this installation, Behar shows how automation, deskilling, and algorithmic decision-making are changing activities like driving and office work. The driverless chairs’ tentative, constrained movements suggest that technological innovations like these may produce more restrictions than freedoms. In the words of critic Chase Bucklew, "Innocuous and playful on the surface, the exhibition eventually elicits horror and unease: have we created something bigger than us, it asks, a force that could overshadow humanity (and the humanities) and render us obsolete?"

=== Maritime Messaging: Red Hook ===
Maritime Messaging: Red Hook (2017) is a public performance that took place on NYC Ferry boats crossing between Wall Street and Red Hook. The performance on October 29, 2017 marked the five-year anniversary of Hurricane Sandy. It was co-produced with Pioneer Works and PortSide New York, two organizations based in Red Hook, a Brooklyn neighborhood that was hard hit by the storm.

Maritime Messaging considers how water witnesses and absorbs traces of human activity throughout history. In the words of art critic Laila Pedro, the project invites the water to "talk back," by "draw[ing] on the accumulated memories the water might hold." In the performance, a mock conversation unfolds between the Atlantic Ocean and an AI digital assistant app that Pedro explains, “sends messages into the water and then translates its sounds — waves, splashes — creating a mysterious, evocative ‘dialogue.’”

=== Roomba Rumba ===
Roomba Rumba (2015) is an interactive installation in which two Roombas carrying potted rubber tree plants vacuum a bright green carpet. The Roombas appear to be dancing with each other and with visitors. They mirror the "little old ant" in the song "High Hopes" by Frank Sinatra, trying against all odds to "move that rubber tree plant.”

Curators Fatma Çolakoğlu and Ulya Soley describe how the installation "draws uncanny similarities between the plants and exploited workers, as well as machine production and human labor." For Behar, Roomba Rumba provides opportunities for human/nonhuman solidarities. The piece has also been exhibited under the alternate title, High Hopes (Deux).

=== E-Waste ===
E-Waste (2014) is a series of USB sculptures that stages a science-fictional post-apocalyptic future in which humans are extinct and only devices populate the Earth.

Art critic Meredith Kooi describes how "E-Waste encourage[s] the viewer to affectively engage with techno-detritus." Kooi writes that "Behar's future dystopia—in which digital entities persist, even thrive, beyond human extinction—by extension creates conditions in which viewers can witness a world they cannot inhabit, but in which the human hand remains discernible, through its own technological waste. . . . But the earth that swaddles these gadgets is composed of mainly inorganic material—the soil itself has become aplastic replica of its failed self."

Art critic Kaya Genç and curator Ulya Soley describe E-Waste as "a timeless dystopia" related to Nicolas Bourriaud's concept of "the exform." In E-Waste, "handmade bits and pieces of machine-made electronic sculptures in the installation are both futuristic and aged, analog and digital, animate and inanimate."

=== Modelling Big Data ===
Modeling Big Data (2014) is a six-channel video installation in which the artist performs as an obese data body. Parodying the overproduction of so-called big data, Behar repeats movements that she calls data gestures. In four scenes she mimics four common computer routines: clicking, buffering, caching, and pinging.

Theorist Tung-Hui Hu describes the moving figure's undulating motion as resembling “that of a natural organism, but the costume and mise-en-scène of the video appears inorganic; the combination is disconcerting because we expect body or data, and yet we see both at once. [… T]he literal data-body appears so lethargic that it is barely able to move, producing a choreographed awkwardness, or a virtuous antivirtuosity." As a result, he explains that Behar allows "the self to become more like an indistinct mass of data […] by accepting rather than resisting its objectification."

=== Autoresponder.exe ===
Autoresponder.exe (2012) is a 4K video that slowly scans to reveal an image of an executive desk standing on end in a disheveled office. The video compares a scene of managerial power to automated e-mail scripts, implying that like the e-mail reply software, corporate culture is impersonal, ineffective, and tone-deaf.

=== Compositions for Bit ===
Compositions for Bit (2010) is Behar's farewell concert for Disney’s original cult-classic Tron that took place at Judson Church in New York, NY. The interactive concert featured the polyhedron sidekick Bit as three larger than life sculptures—each holding a dancer, lasers, video mixes, original sound scores, and other components of arcade culture that were brought together as an immersive environment.

=== 3G56k ===
3G56k (2009) is an interactive installation and BDSM-themed performance involving a twelve-foot touchscreen "iPhone" and a ten-foot tower computer. The iPhone requires a human "dialer" to input a number to call the dial-up modem inside the pink computer tower. Each call causes an analog thermal fax to slowly print out an image of the rubber hose connecting the two machines through an opening in the tower.

=== Primaries ===
Primaries (2008) is a three-channel video installation of three circular projections, each seven and a half feet tall. The circles rotate while gaining and losing momentum equal to the sounds of the fans of the motors. The projections are saturated in red, yellow, and blue, each with footage of a distorted figure that is edited to counteract the "gravity" of the rotations.

=== Pipecleaner ===
Pipecleaner (2007) is a cross-platform screensaver that shows a pole dancer invading the kitschy late-90s Microsoft screensaver "3D Pipes." The dancer wears a dress made of cleaning gloves and attempts to climb, polish, and clean the pipes while her actions are constantly overwritten by the growing pipe maze. Behar compares the maintenance work of the pipe cleaning pole dancer to the maintenance work that screensaver software does to keep screens in good condition. She suggests Pipecleaner is an example of nonanthropocentric art because unlike most art, screensavers serve machines and are not intended for humans to look at.

== Collaborations ==
=== Disorientalism ===
Disorientalism (2005–present) is a long-term multimedia performance art collaboration between Behar and artist and professor Marianne M. Kim. The duo studies the disorienting effects of technologized labour, junk culture, and consumerism. Through performance, video, and photographic projects, they explore how these mediate race, gender, and bodies.

== Exhibitions ==
Behar's artwork has appeared in galleries, museums, festivals, and art spaces all over the globe. Some noted exhibitions include:

Beall Center for Art + Technology in Irvine, CA; Pera Museum in Istanbul; Sector 2337 in Chicago; Boston Cyberarts Gallery; Tuska Center for Contemporary Art at University of Kentucky in Lexington; SPRING/BREAK Art Fair in New York; Museum of Contemporary Art North Miami, Judson Memorial Church in New York; UNOACTU in Dresden; The Girls Club Collection in Miami; Feldman Gallery + Project Space in Portland; De Balie Centre for Culture and Politics in Amsterdam; the Mediations Biennale in Poznan; the Chicago Cultural Center; the Swiss Institute in Rome; the National Museum of Art in Cluj-Napoca.

== Books ==
In tandem with her creative work, Behar is also a writer and theorist. She is published in many different books, journals, and catalogues. Behar writes on subjects concerning embodiment and technology, automation and labor, cyborgian human/machine ethics, emerging and obsolete technologies, and feminist media critique. Her books include:

=== Object-Oriented Feminism ===
In 2010, Behar established "object-oriented feminism" (OOF), an interdisciplinary field of feminist materialist analysis. Her edited collection Object-Oriented Feminism “explores the political and ethical potential of being an object.” It was published in 2016 by University of Minnesota Press, which describes the book as “a feminist intervention into recent philosophical discourses—like speculative realism, object-oriented ontology, and new materialism—that take objects, things, stuff, and matter as primary.” Patricia Ticineto Clough states that Behar is "not shy in reestablishing feminist theory as a primary resource for thinking about objects, things and environments." For reviewer Jesse Bordwin, “Object-oriented criticism and feminist theory are not obviously compatible—their commitments and assumptions seldom overlap—but that tension is precisely what energizes the new collection Object-Oriented Feminism.”

=== And Another Thing: Nonanthropocentrism and Art ===
In 2016, Behar and Emmy Mikelson, coedited And Another Thing: Nonanthropocentrism and Art, an expanded exhibition catalog for their 2011 co-curated exhibition at the CUNY Graduate Center's James Gallery. This book shows “how artists have figured and prefigured nonanthropocentric ideas strikingly similar to those expounded in various ‘new’ realist, materialist, and speculativist philosophies."

=== Bigger than You: Big Data and Obesity ===
Also in 2016, Behar published an essay chapbook, Bigger than You: Big Data and Obesity. In this book she coins the term “decelerationist aesthetics” to name “the aesthetic properties, proclivities, and performances of objects come to defy the accelerationist imperative to be nimbly individuated.” This imaginative research work coincided with Behar's video series, which puts her decelerationist theory into practice.

=== Art catalogs ===
Behar's solo exhibitions, Data's Entry and E-Waste, were accompanied by illustrated catalogs with the artist's writings and essays by new media scholars and curators.

== Lectures ==
Behar frequently speaks on her artwork and critical theory.

=== Artist lectures ===
- Pera Museum (2016) “Optimized, not Optimistic”
- Georgia Tech Brown Bag Lecture (2015) “Underhanded: Digital Digits, Manual Manipulation, and Nonhuman Art”
- University at Buffalo PLASMA Lecture (2014) “Even the Ugly Bits"

=== Theory lectures and conversations ===
- Brown University Earth(ly) Matters Symposium (2018) “What Makes Sense? Environmental Sensing and Nonhuman Sense”
- Roma Tre / Institute of Network Cultures Selfie Conference (2017) “Personalities Without People”
- CUNY Graduate Center (2016) “Object-Oriented Feminism”
- Tuning Speculations (2016) “Speaking Volumes”

=== Digital feminism discussions ===
- empyre list serve (2016) “Feminist Data Visualization”
- Museum of Art and Design (2015) “Power, Collaboration & Lies”
- FemTechNet (2014) “Imagine Cyberfeminist Creativity”
