= Bihari =

Bihari often refers to:

- of Bihar, a state in central eastern India

Bihari may also refer as Aditya:

== Populations and languages ==
- Biharis, people of Bihar
- Bihari languages, a language family
- Languages of Bihar, the languages spoken in Bihar
- Bihari diaspora
- Bihari Mauritians
- Bihari Muslims
- Bihari Rajput

== People ==
- Bihari Lal (1595–1663), Hindi poet known for the Satasaī
- Bihari brothers, American music industry entrepreneurs
- János Bihari (1764–1824/1827?), Hungarian Romani violinist
- Lal Bihari (born 1955), founder of the Association of the Dead
- Mukut Bihari, Indian politician
- Shamsul Huda Bihari (died 1987), Indian songwriter and poet
- Atal Bihari Vajpayee (1924–2018), Prime Minister of India
- Vinay Bihari, Indian politician
- Awadh Bihari Choudhary, Indian politician
- Aasim Bihari, Indian social activist
- Binod Bihari Mahato, Indian politician

== Places ==
- Basuki Bihari, village in Bihar
- Mithila Bihari, municipality in Nepal

== See also ==
- Bihar (disambiguation)
- Behari, a given name
- Johnson Beharry VC, British Army soldier of the Princess of Wales's Royal Regiment
