= Bahariyeh =

Bahariyeh or Behariyeh (Persian: بهاريه) may refer to:

- Bahariyeh, Khuzestan
- Bahariyeh, Markazi
- Bahariyeh, Razavi Khorasan

== See also ==
- Behari (disambiguation)
- Bahari (disambiguation)
