= Bihar (disambiguation) =

Bihar is a state in India.

Bihar may also refer to:

== Places ==
=== India ===
- Bihar Province, former colonial province in British India
- Bihar Subah, a Bihar-based Mughal imperial province
- Bihar Sharif, headquarters of Nalanda district, Bihar, India
- Bihar Circuit, a Hindi film distribution circuit comprising Bihar, Jharkhand and Nepal
- Bihar River, a border river of Palamu district, Jharkhand, India
- Bihar, Unnao, a village in Uttar Pradesh, India

=== Elsewhere ===
- Bihar County, a historic county of the Kingdom of Hungary
- Bihor County (Bihar County in Hungarian), a county of current-day Romania
- Bihar, the Hungarian name for Biharia Commune, Bihor County, Romania

== People ==
- Bihar (king), a khagan of the Khazars

== See also ==
- Behar (disambiguation), a portion in the annual Jewish cycle of Torah reading
- Bihar al-Anwar, a hadith compilation by Allamah Majlisi
- Bihari (disambiguation)
- Bihor (disambiguation)
- Hajdú-Bihar, a county in Hungary
- Cooch Behar (disambiguation), a district in West Bengal
  - Cooch Behar State, a former princely state in India
