= Vehari (disambiguation) =

Vehari is a city in Punjab, Pakistan.

Vehari may also refer to:

- Vehari District, a district of Punjab (Pakistan)
- Vehari Tehsil, a tehsil of district Vehari
- Vehari railway station, a railway station in Pakistan.

== See also ==
- Behar (disambiguation)
- Vehari Wildlife Park, a wildlife park in Pakistan.
