= Bihor =

Bihor may mean:

- Bihor County, in Romania
- Bihor Mountains, in Romania
- Bihor (fortress), in Montenegro
- Bihor (region), in Montenegro

== See also ==
- Bihar (disambiguation)
