= Fischer, Behar, Chen, Well, Orion & Co. =

Israeli law firm

Fischer Behar Chen Well Orion & Co.
- Type: Partnership (Israel)
- Industry: Law
- Founded: Tel Aviv, Israel (1958)
- Headquarters: Tel Aviv, Israel
- Key people: Reuven Behar, Partner; Amir Chen, Partner; Avraham Well, Partner; Dr. Gil Orion, Partner
- Products: Legal advice
- Number of employees: 320 (200 Attorneys)
- Website: www.fbclawyers.com

Fischer Behar Chen Well Orion & Co. ("FBC") is among Israel's leading and largest law firms. The firm specializes in commercial law.

== History ==
Fischer Behar Chen Well Orion & Co ("FBC") was founded in 1958 by Isachar Fischer (1929-2013). FBC was awarded the 2015 Israel Law Firm of the Year by IFLR.
