= Behari =

Behari is a name. Notable people with the name include:

- Ardian Behari (born 1973), Albanian football player
- Behari Lal Gupta (1849–1916), Indian politician and member of the Indian Civil Service

== See also ==
- Behar (disambiguation)
- Bihari (disambiguation)
- Bahariyeh (disambiguation)
