= Howard Behar =

American businessman

Howard Behar was the president of Starbucks Coffee Company International and wrote It's Not About The Coffee: Leadership Principles from a Life at Starbucks.

He started working at Starbucks in 1989 when the company had just begun to venture outside the American northwest region. Initially serving as vice president of sales and operations, he grew the retail business from 28 stores to more than 400 by the time he was named president of Starbucks Coffee International in 1995.

Under Behar’s leadership, Starbucks opened its first location in Tokyo in 1996. Following the historic opening, over the next three years he introduced the Starbucks brand across Asia and the United Kingdom. After a two-year hiatus, he returned to Starbucks as President of Starbucks North America until his retirement in March 2007. He has been a director of the company since 1996.
