= Pera Museum =

Art museum in Istanbul, Turkey

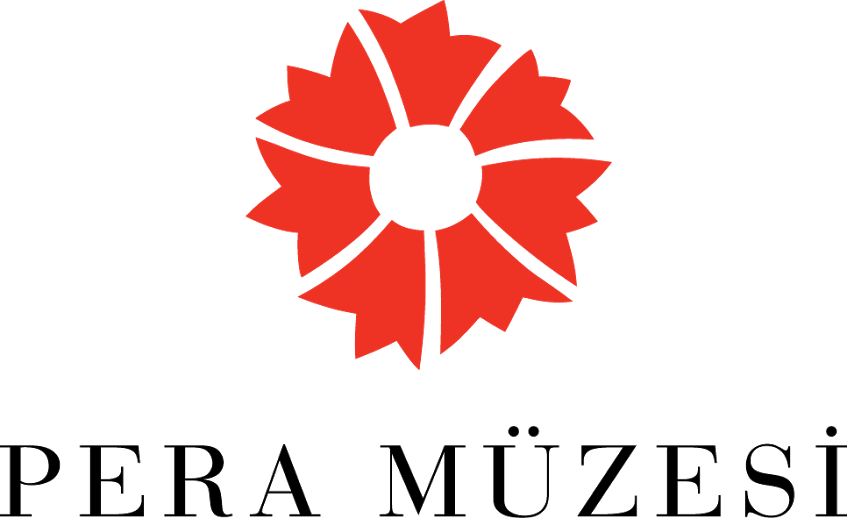

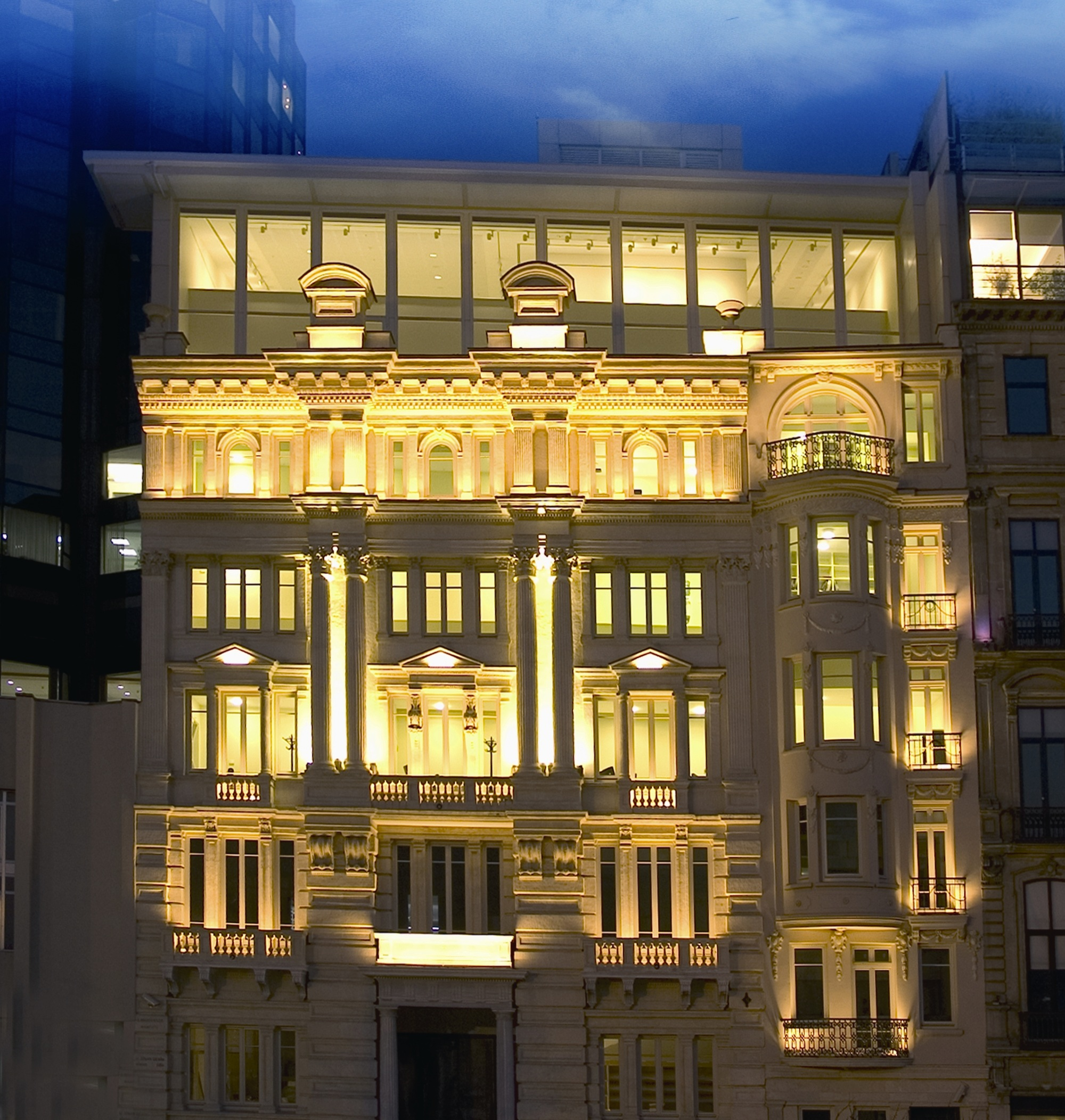
- Pera Museum, Istanbul
- Interactive fullscreen map
- Established: 8 June 2005; 20 years ago
- Location: Meşrutiyet Caddesi No:65; Beyoğlu, Istanbul, Turkey
- Coordinates: 41°01′55″N 28°58′31″E
- Type: Art museum
- Founder: Suna and İnan Kıraç Foundation
- Director: M. Özalp Birol
- Website: https://www.peramuseum.org/

Pera Museum (Turkish: Pera Müzesi) is an art museum in the Tepebaşı quarter of the Beyoğlu (formerly called Pera) district in Istanbul, Turkey, at Meşrutiyet Avenue No. 65, adjacent to İstiklal Avenue and in close proximity to Taksim Square. It has a particular focus on Orientalism in 19th-century art.

== History ==
The Pera Museum was founded by the Suna and İnan Kıraç Foundation in 2005. The museum is located in the historic building of the former Bristol Hotel, which was designed by architect Achille Manoussos and built in 1893. It was renovated between 2003 and 2005 by architect Sinan Genim, who preserved the facade of the building and transformed the interior into a modern and fully equipped museum.

== Collection ==
Pera Museum hosts regular, international loan exhibitions, in addition to holding permanent collections of Orientalist Paintings, Anatolian Weights and Measures, and Kütahya Tiles and Ceramics.

=== Orientalist Painting Collection ===
The museum's Orientalist Painting Collection consists of works by European and Ottoman and Turkish artists, including works by Osman Hamdi Bey and his most famous painting, The Tortoise Trainer.

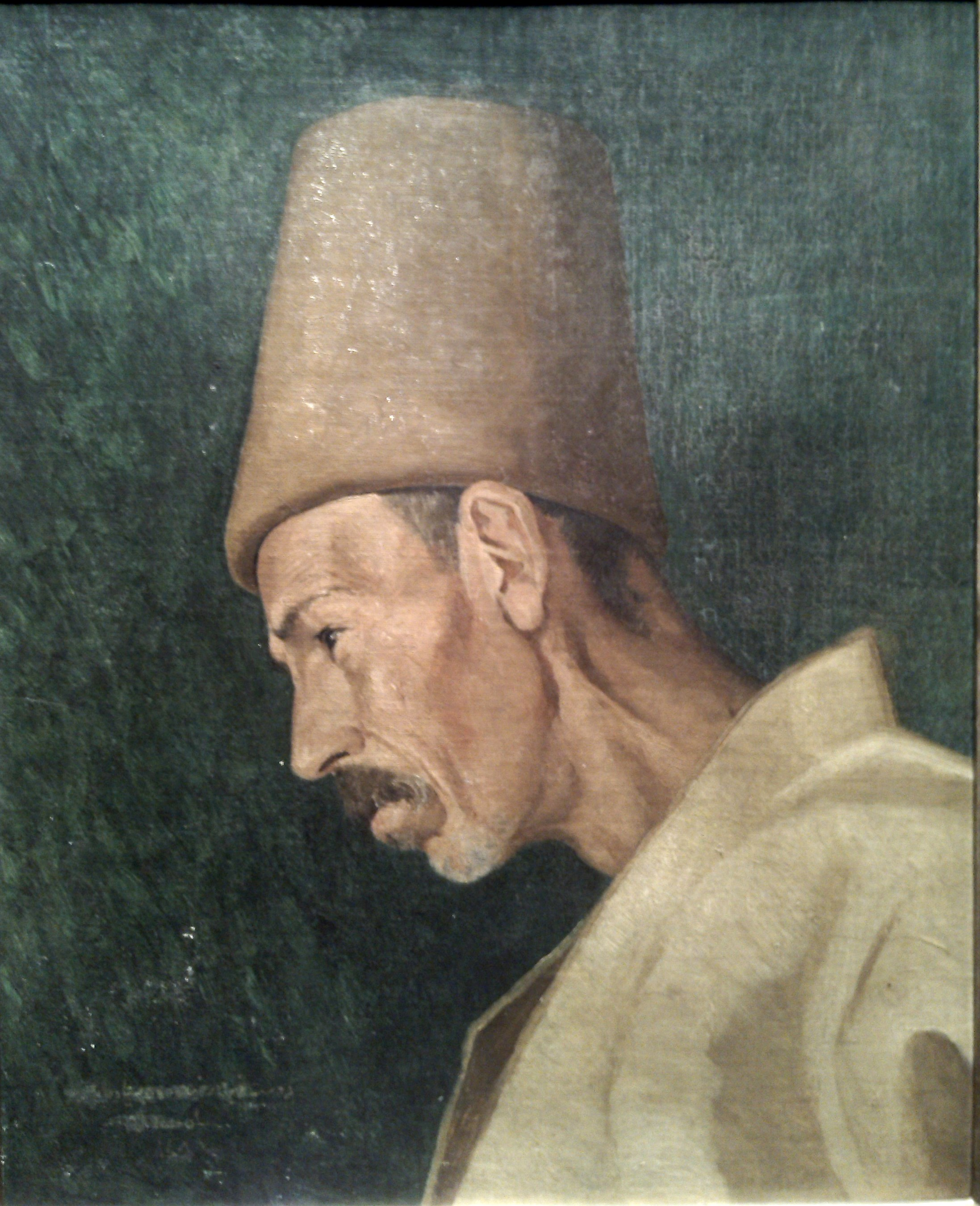
Kökenoğlu Rıza Efendi. Painting by Osman Hamdi Bey, 1871.

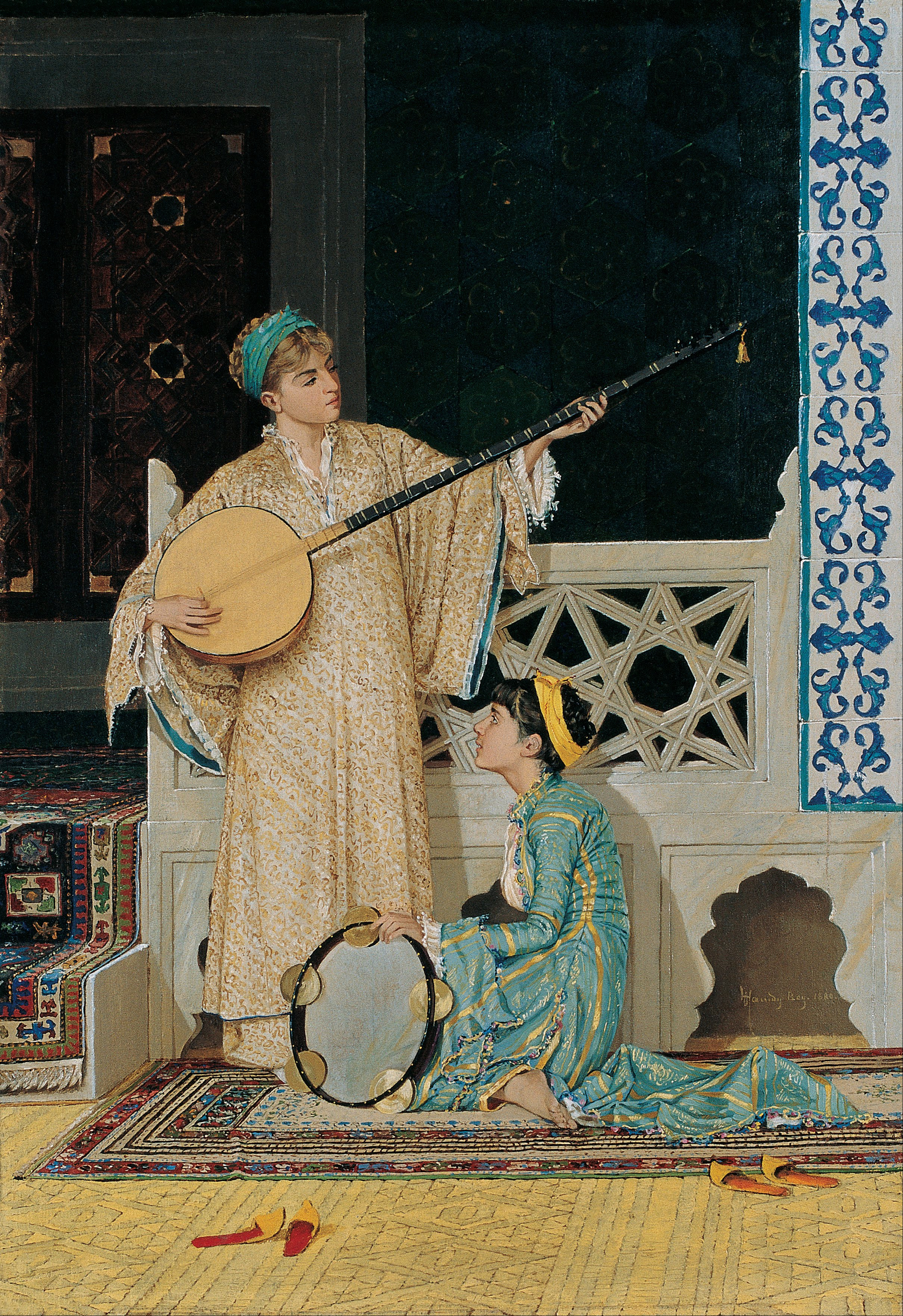
Two Musician Girls. Painting by Osman Hamdi Bey, 1880.

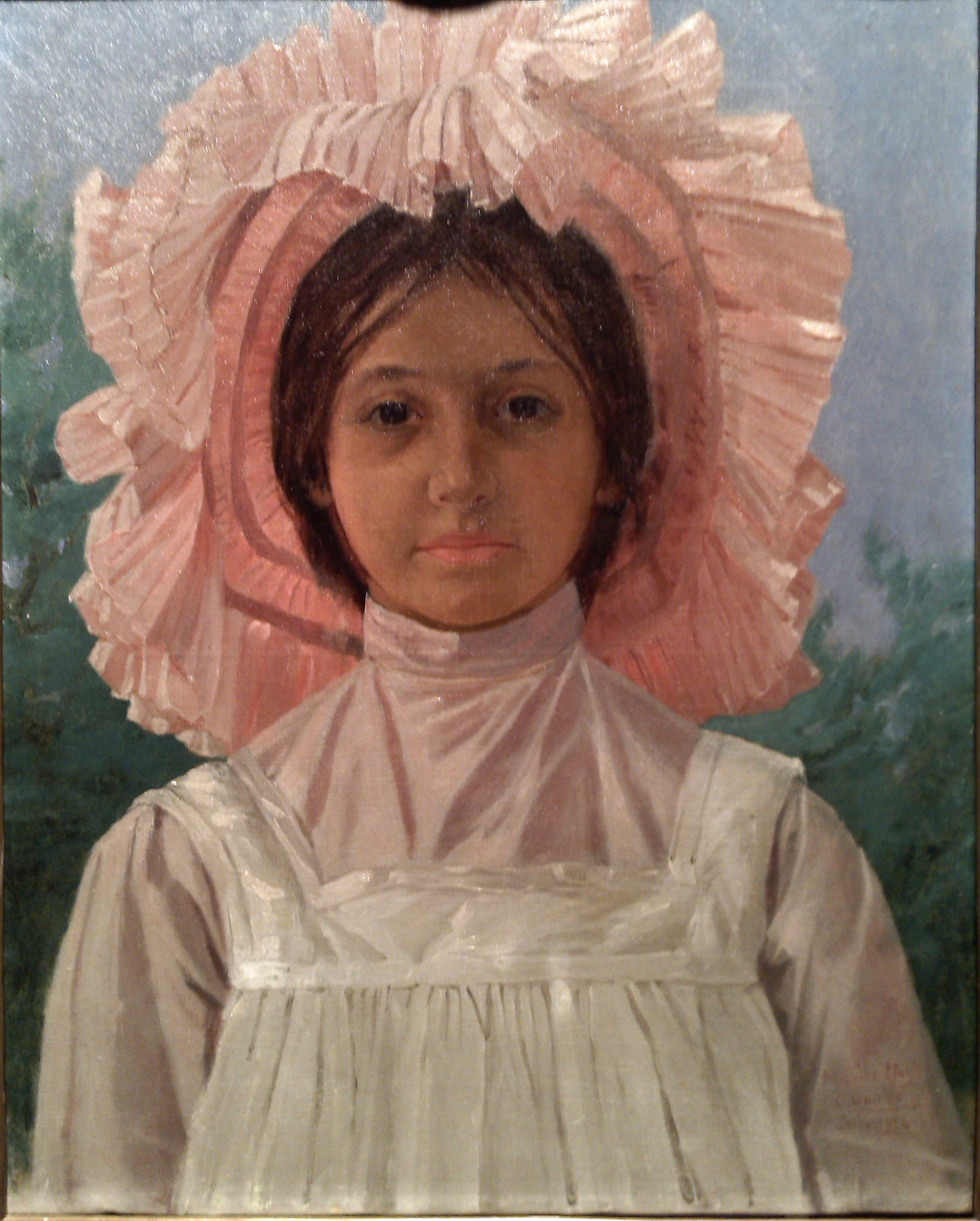
Girl with Pink Cap. Painting by Osman Hamdi Bey, 1904.

The Tortoise Trainer. Painting by Osman Hamdi Bey, 1906.

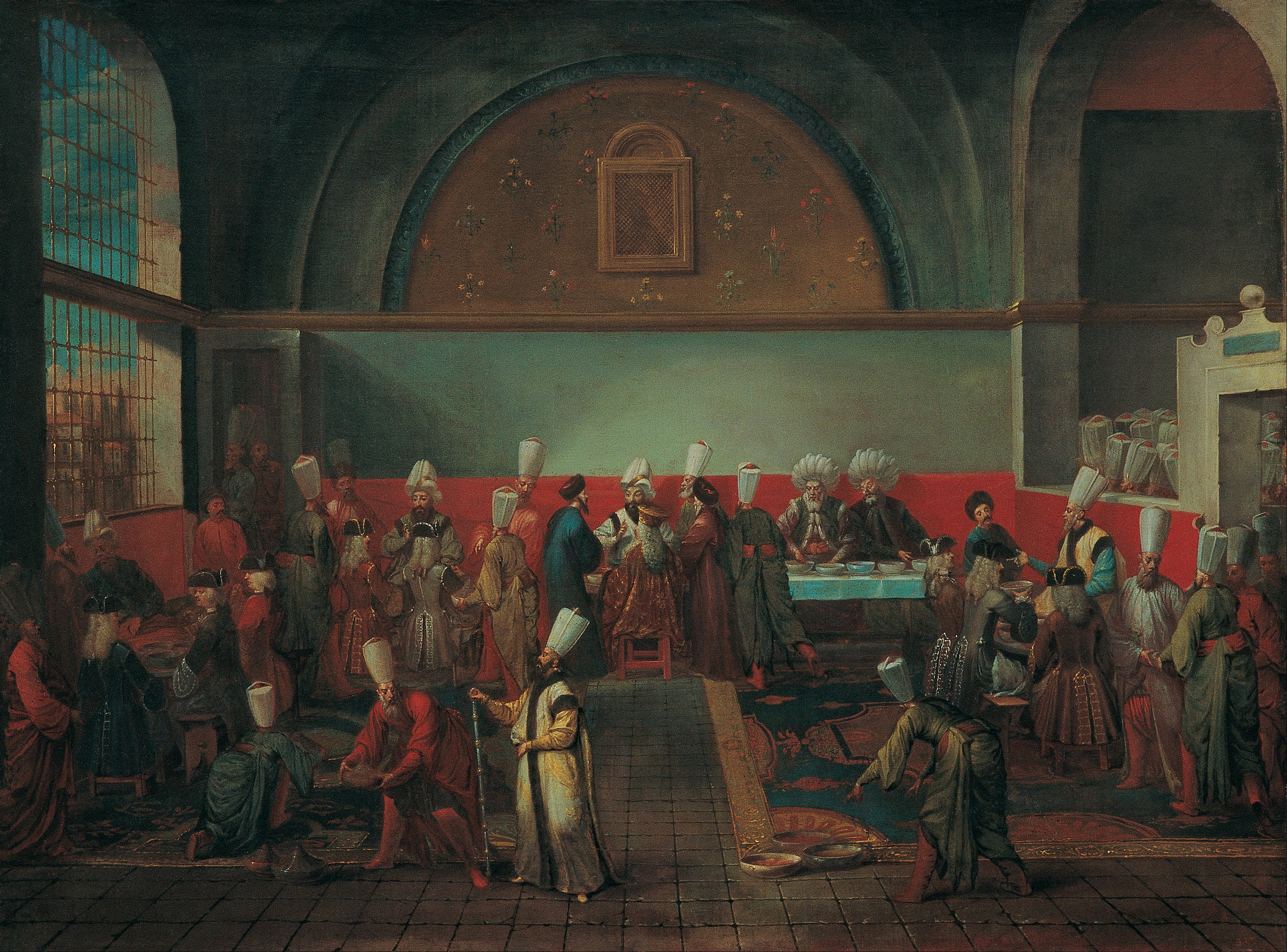
Foreign ambassadors being received at the Topkapı Palace in Istanbul during the reign of Sultan Ahmed III. Painting by Jean-Baptiste van Mour, 1725.

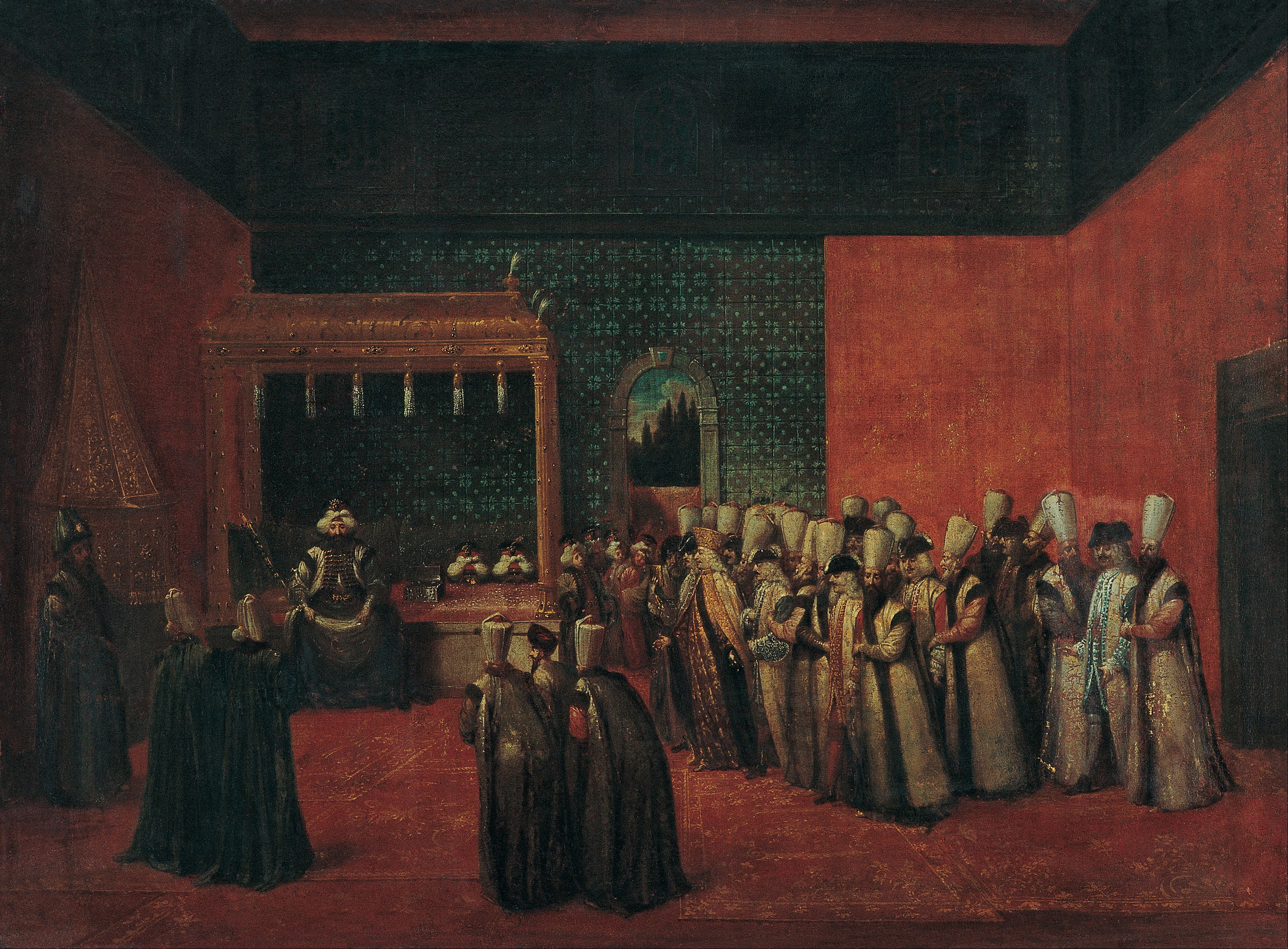
Ottoman Sultan Ahmed III receives the Dutch ambassador Cornelis Calkoen at the Topkapı Palace in 1727. Painting by Jean-Baptiste van Mour, 1727.

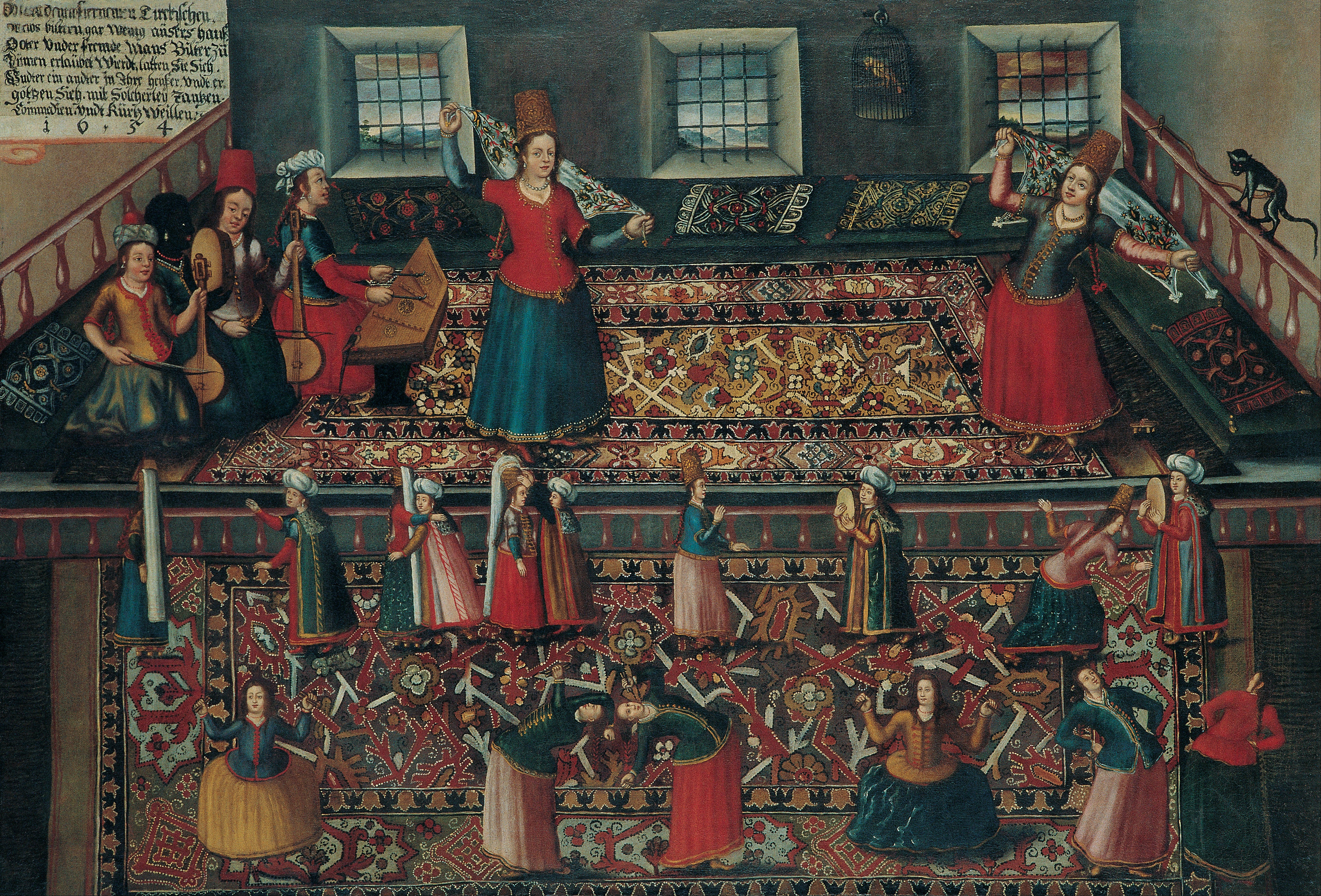
Harem of the Topkapı Palace. Painting by Franz Hermann, 1652.

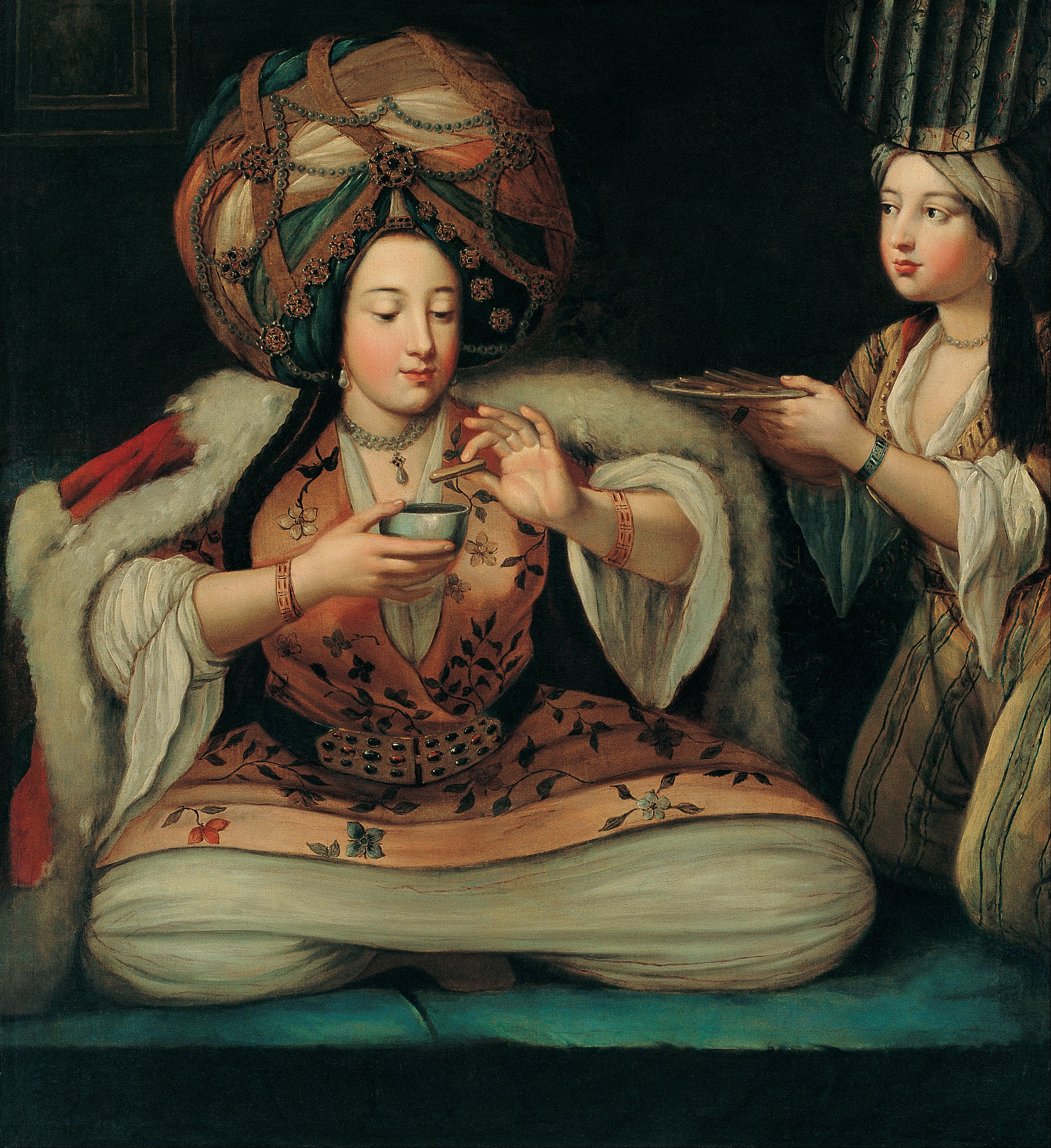
Enjoying Coffee. Painting by an unknown artist of the French school.

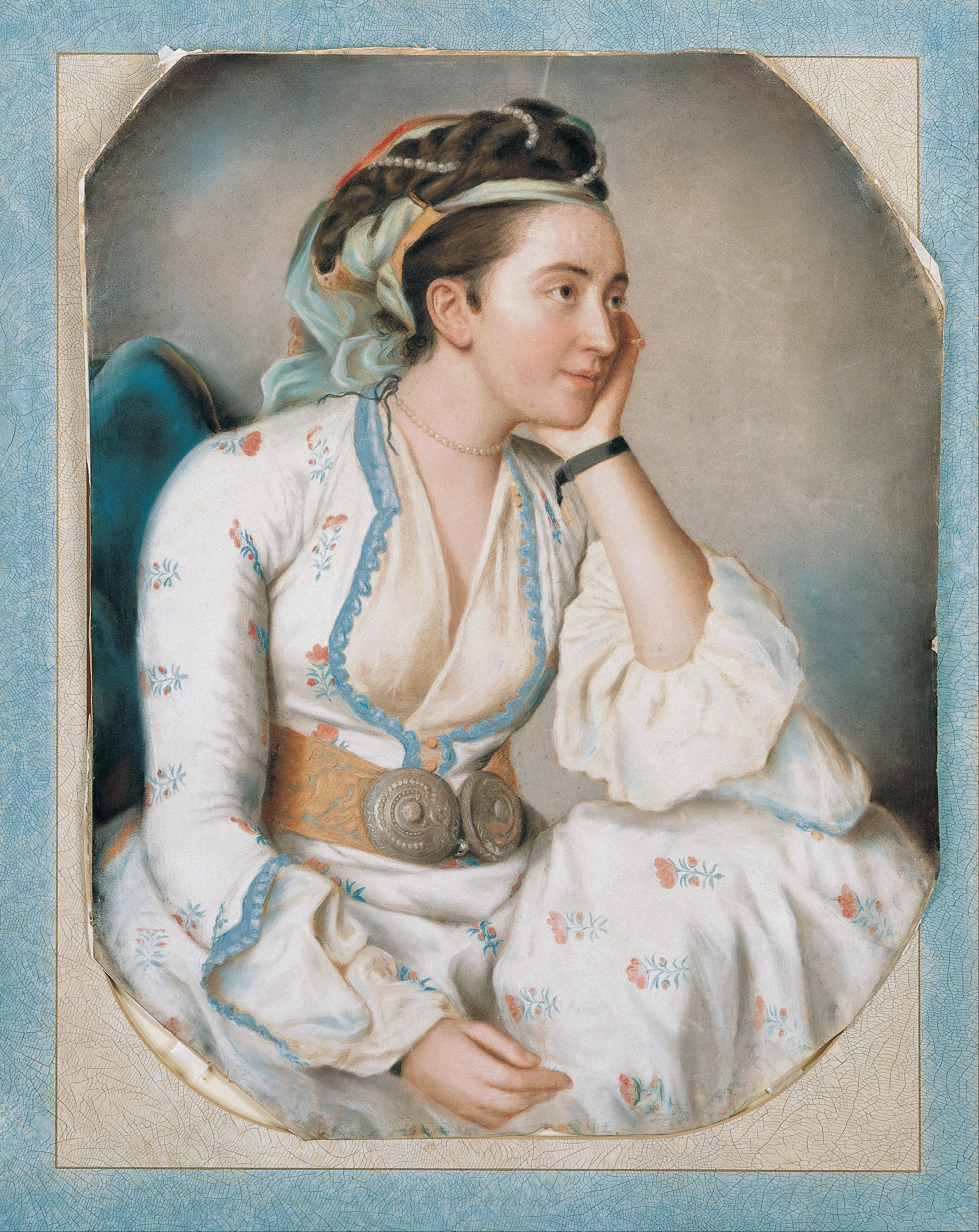
A Woman in Turkish Dress. Painting by Jean-Étienne Liotard.

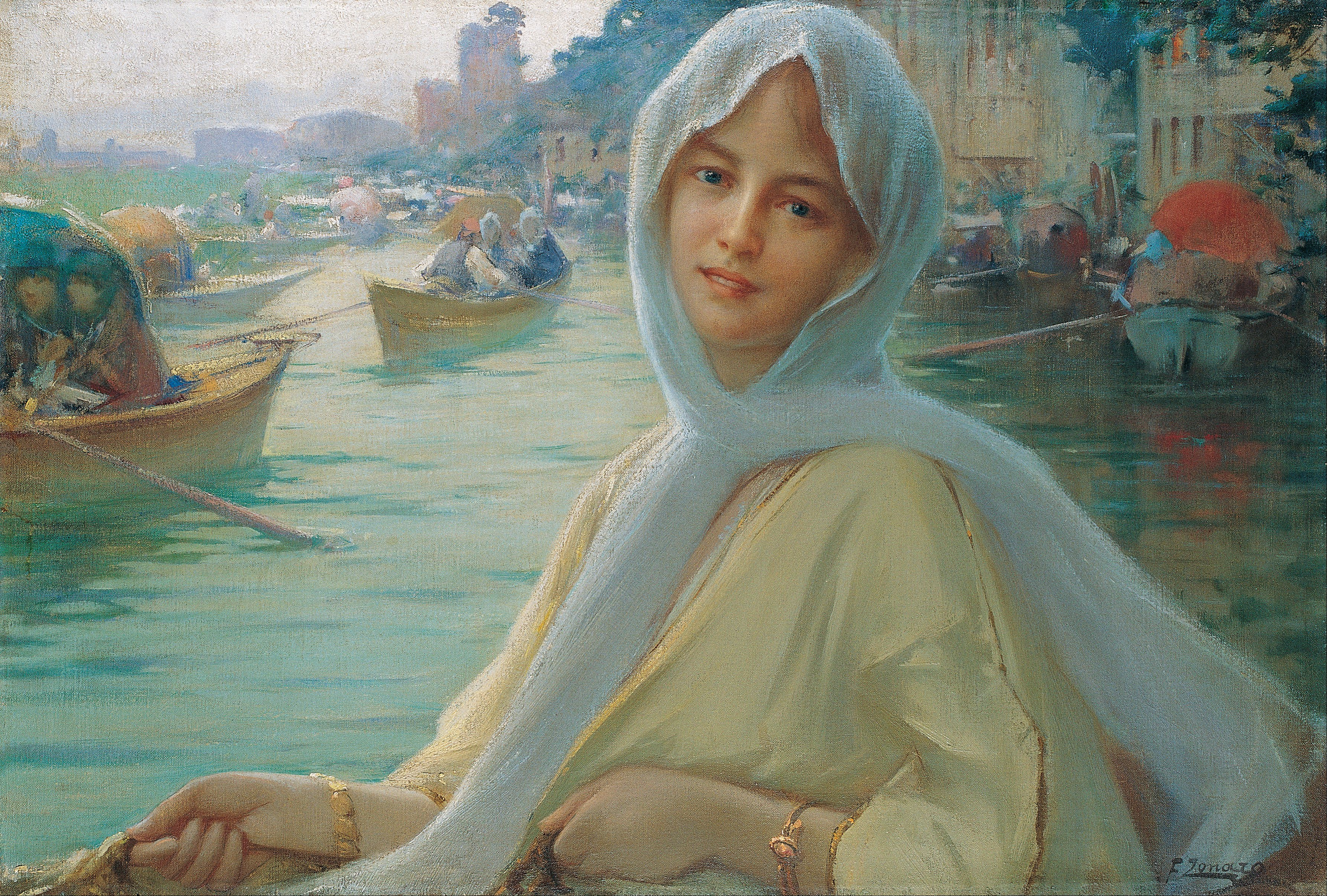
Enjoyment of Göksu Creek. Painting by Fausto Zonaro.

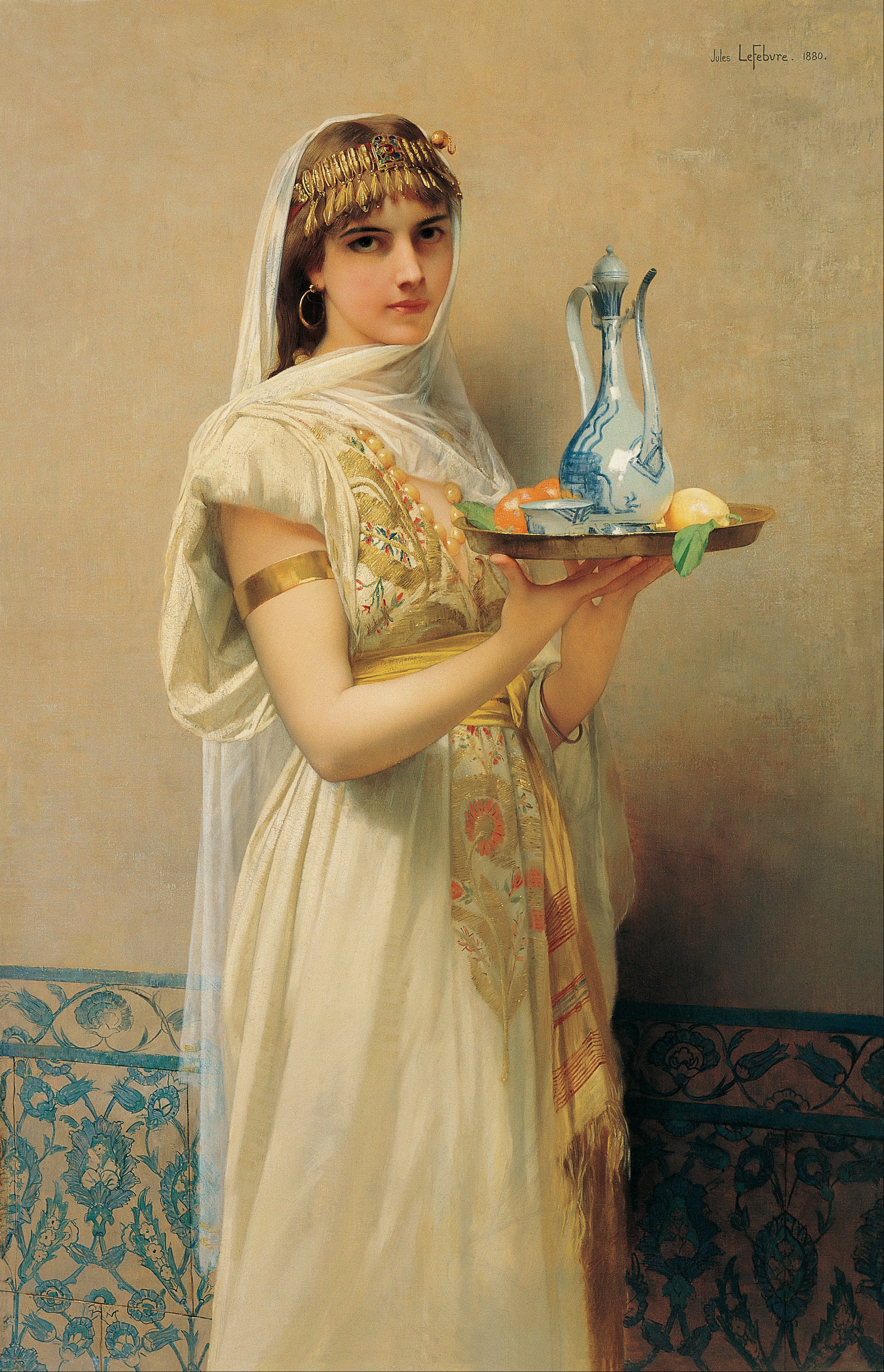
Housemaid. Painting by Jules Joseph Lefebvre, 1880.

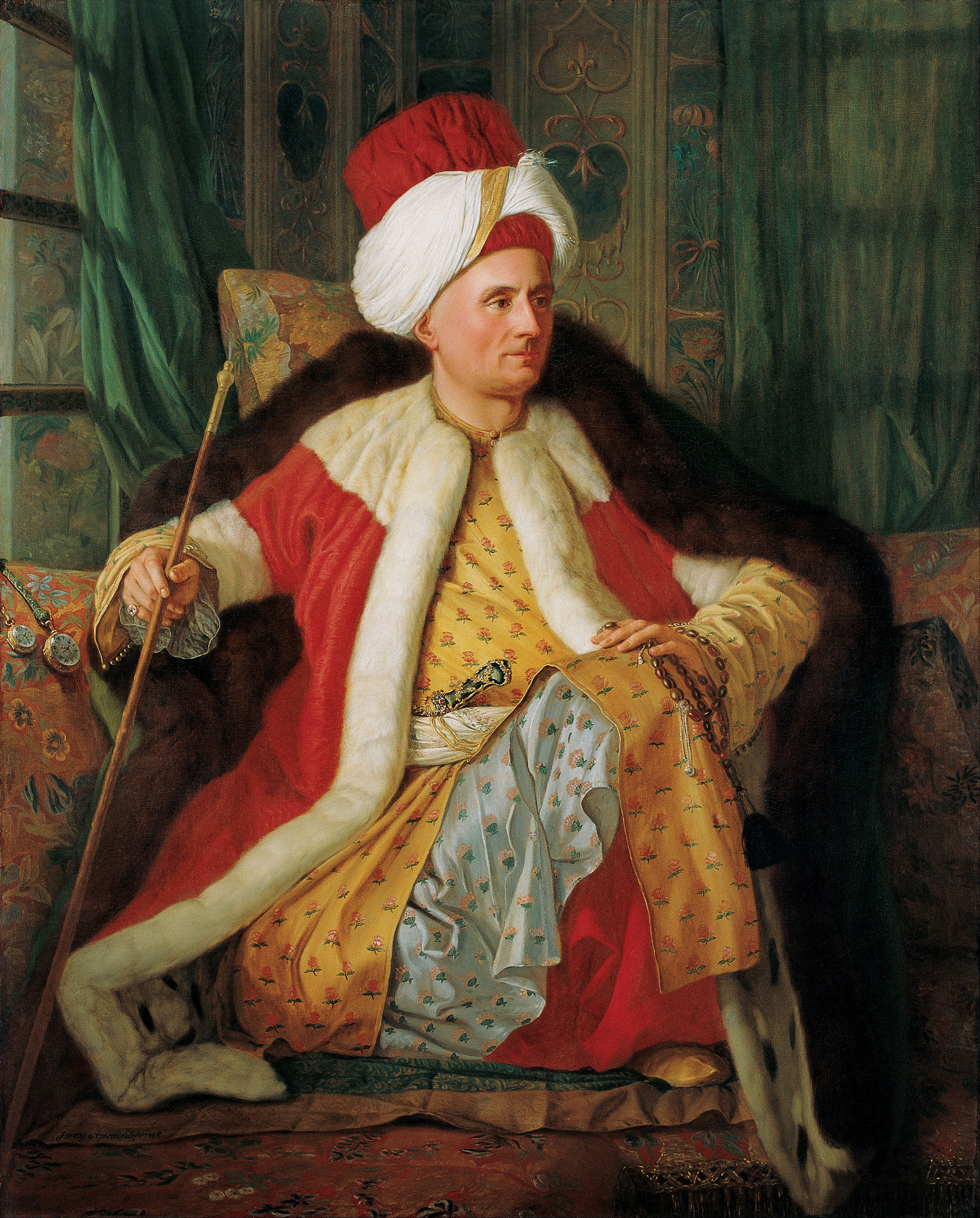
Portrait of Charles Gravier Count of Vergennes and French Ambassador, in Turkish Attire. Painting by Antoine de Favray, 18th century.

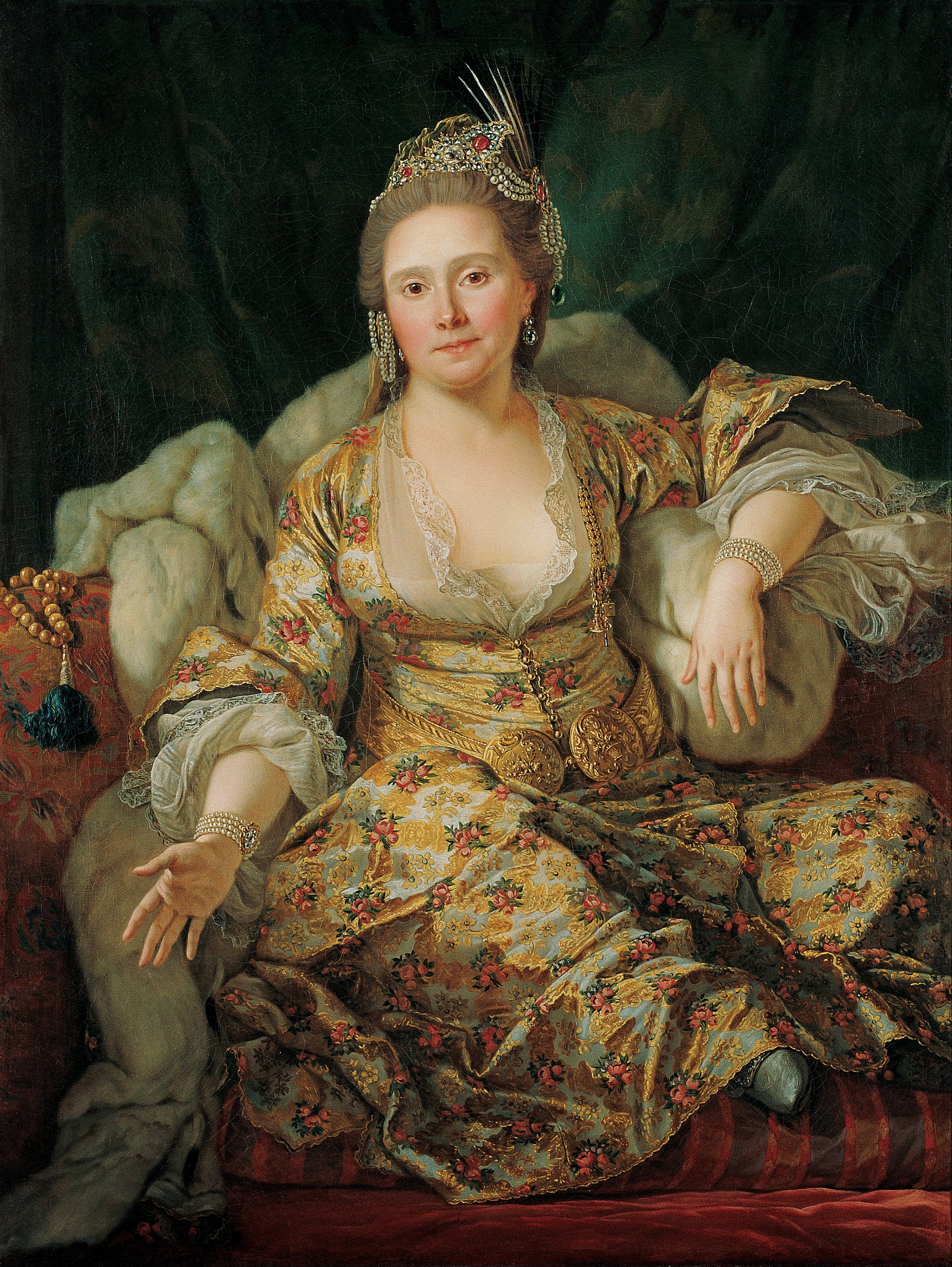
Portrait of the Countess of Vergennes in Turkish Attire. Painting by Antoine de Favray, 18th century.

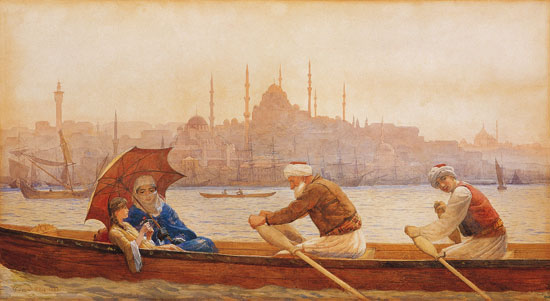
Excursion on the Golden Horn. Painting by Tristam (Tristram) James Ellis, 1888.

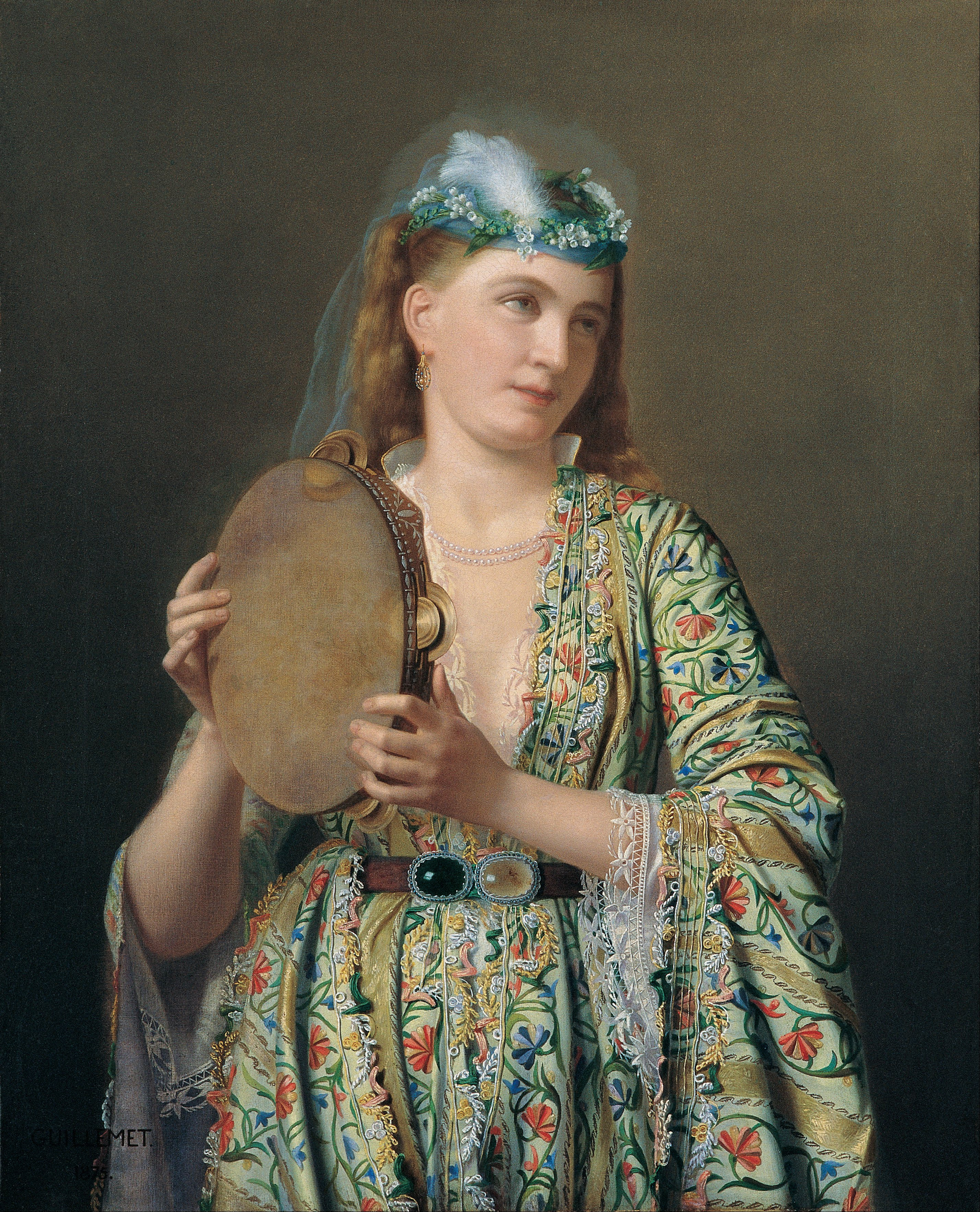
Lady from the Ottoman Court playing the Def. Painting by Pierre-Désiré Guillemet, 1875.

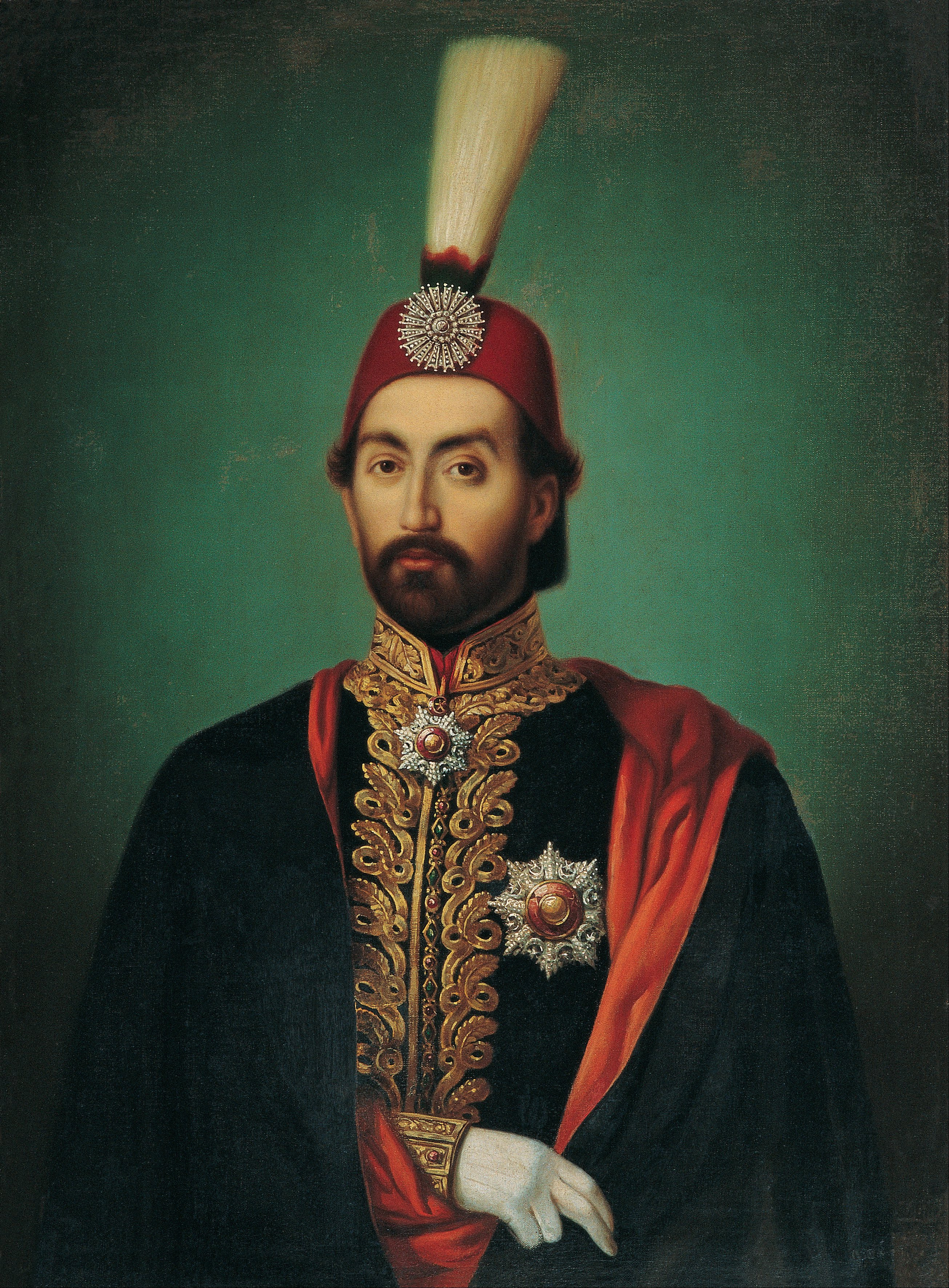
Sultan Abdülmecid I. Painting by an unknown artist, 1850s.

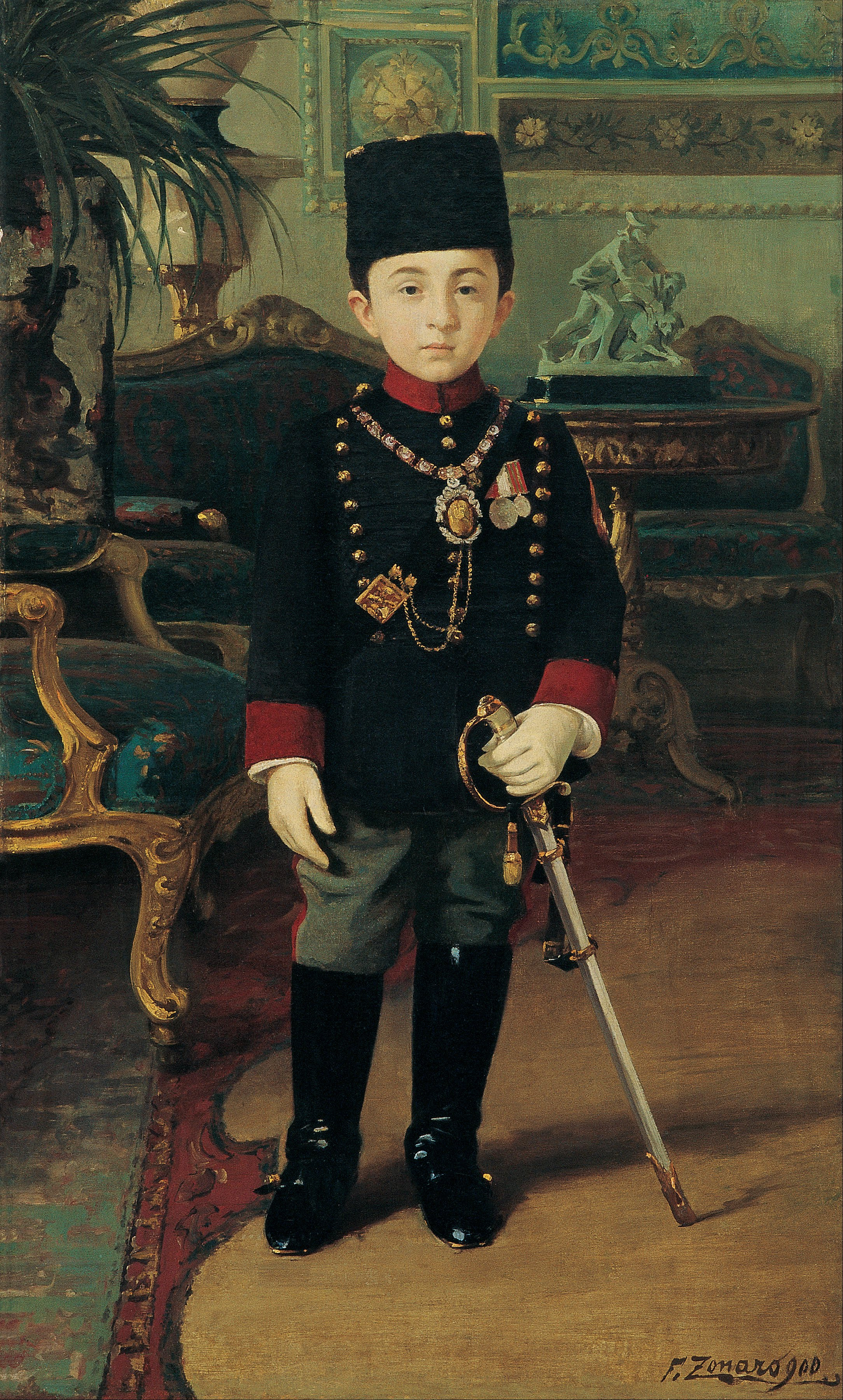
A late Ottoman Şehzade (Prince)

=== Anatolian Weights and Measures Collection ===
The Anatolian Weights and Measures Collection comprises over ten thousand pieces and consists of objects dating from prehistory to those used in present-day Anatolia. These comprise the main types of scales and measuring instruments, used for measuring weight, length, and volume in every field, from land measurement to commerce, architecture to jewelry making, shipping to pharmacy.

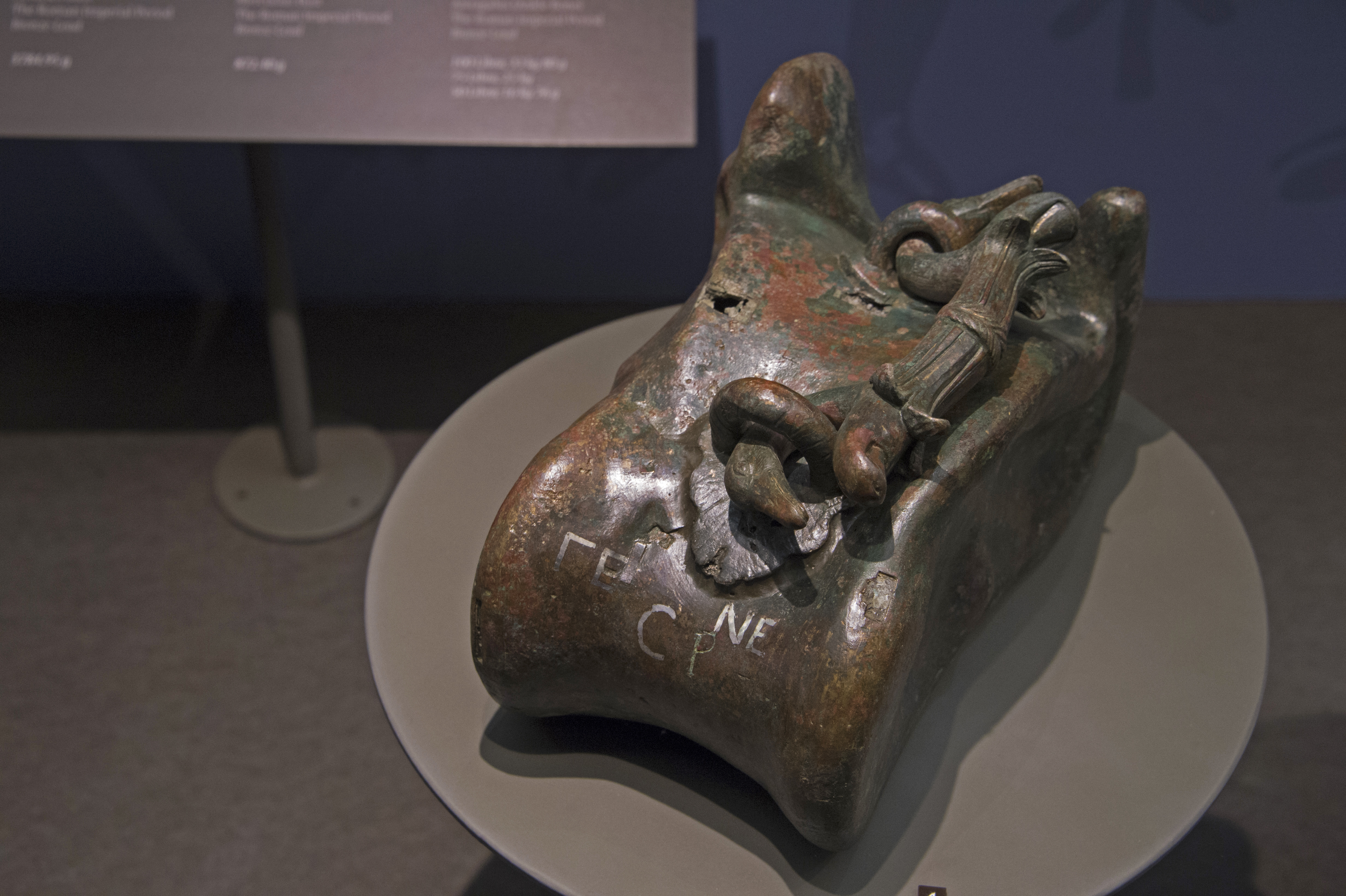
Istanbul Pera museum Anatolian weights and measures Weight

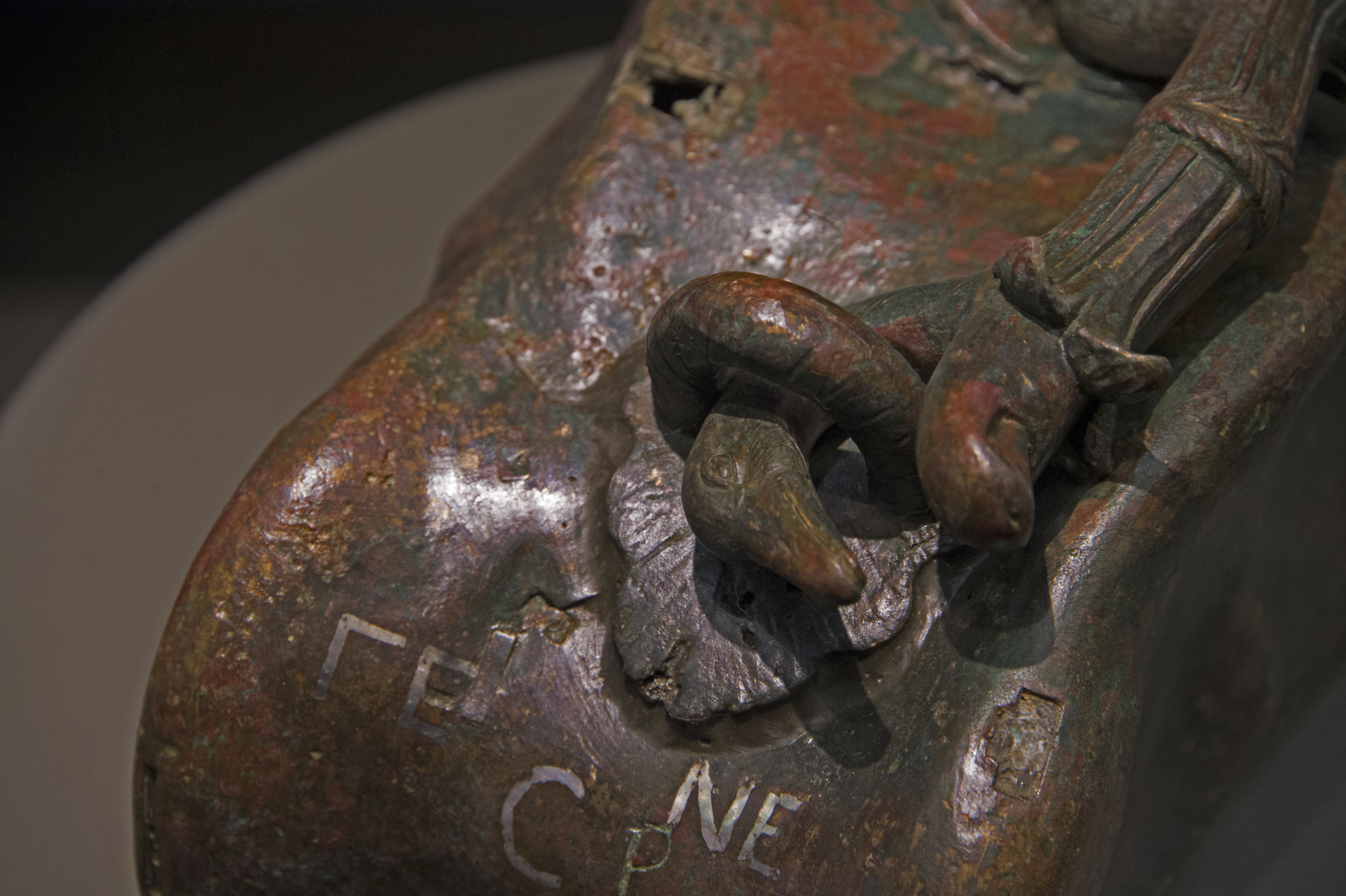
Istanbul Pera museum Anatolian weights and measures Weight detail

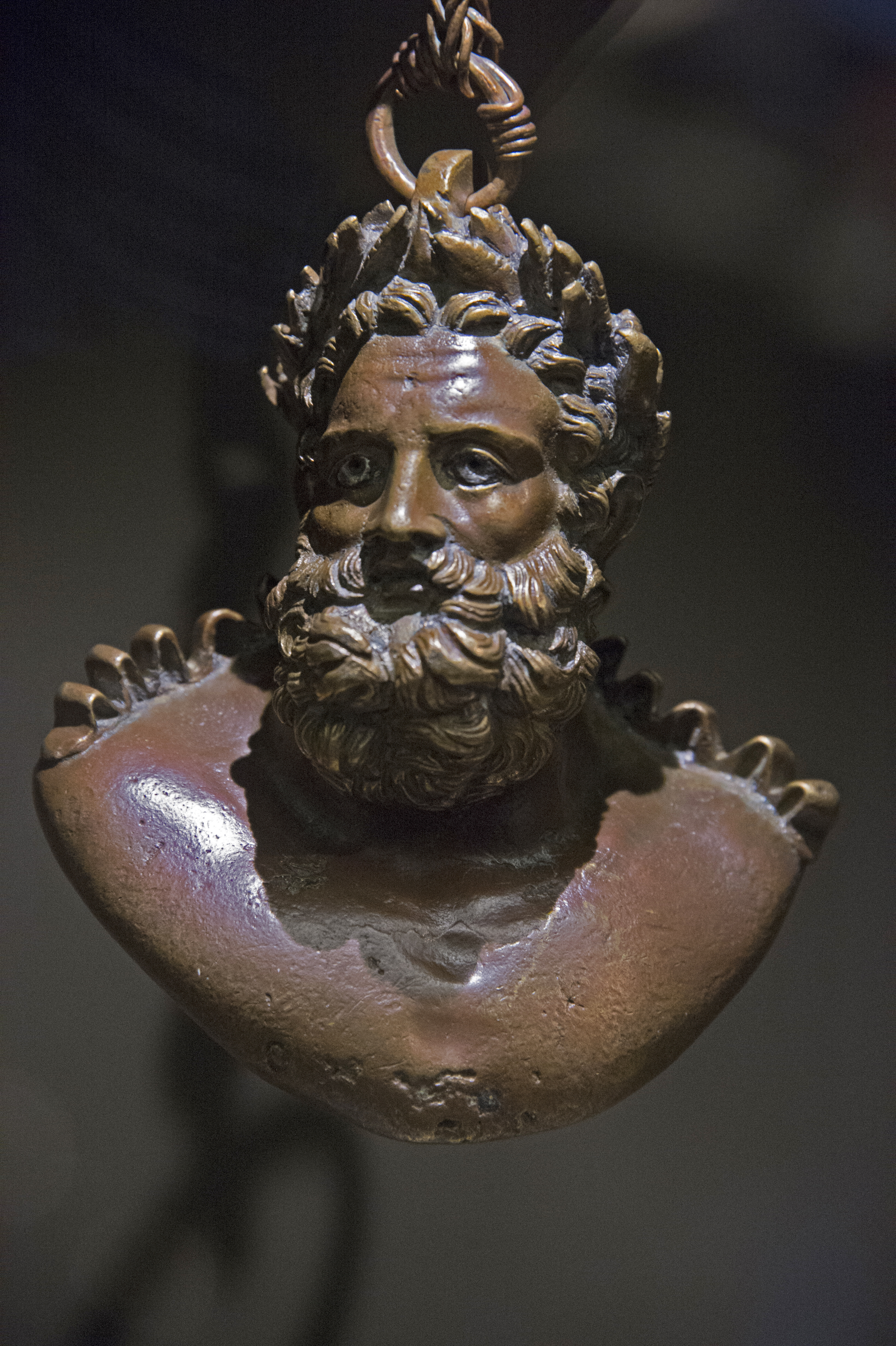
Istanbul Pera museum Anatolian weights and measures Weight

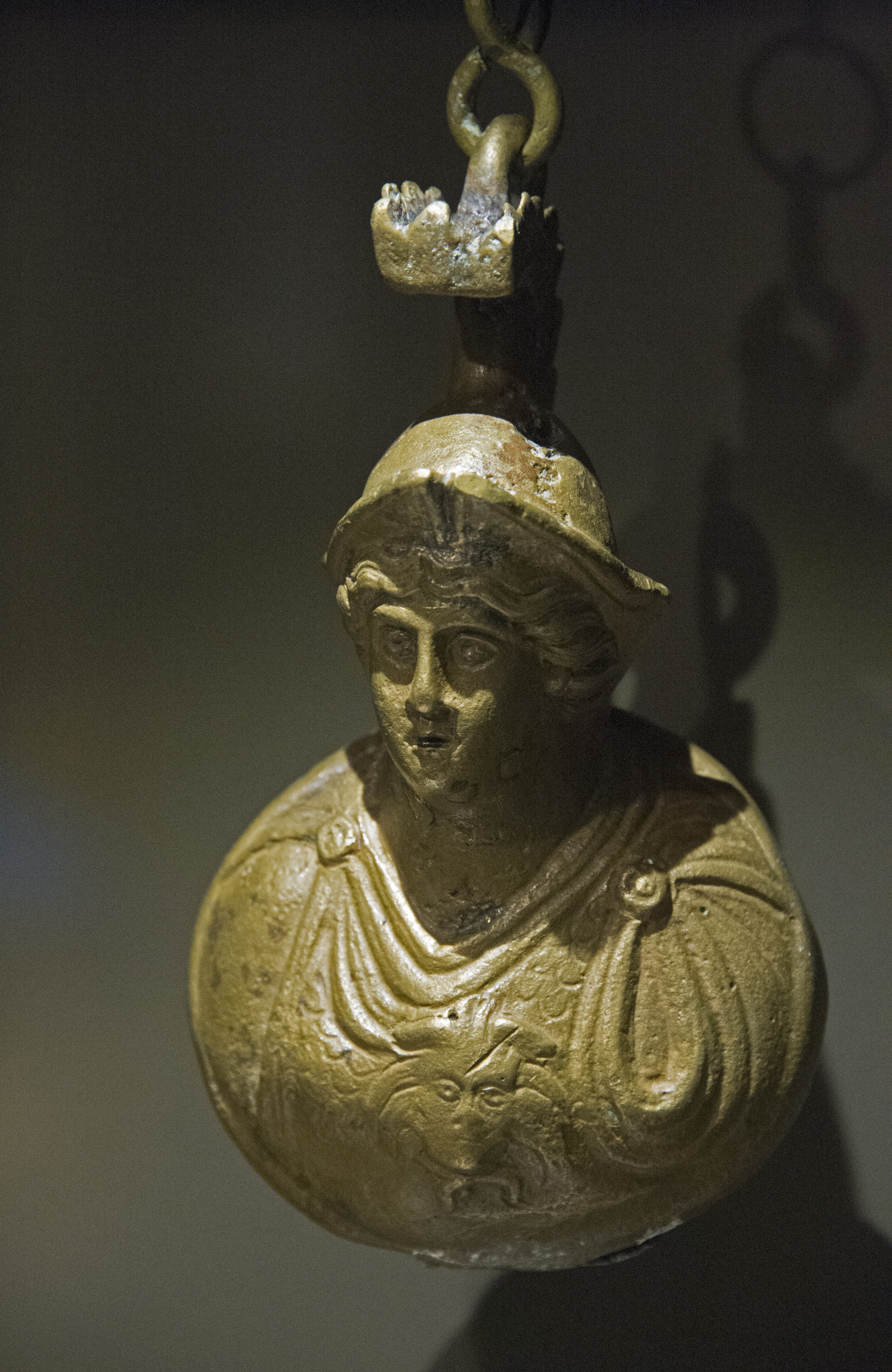
Istanbul Pera museum Anatolian weights and measures Weight

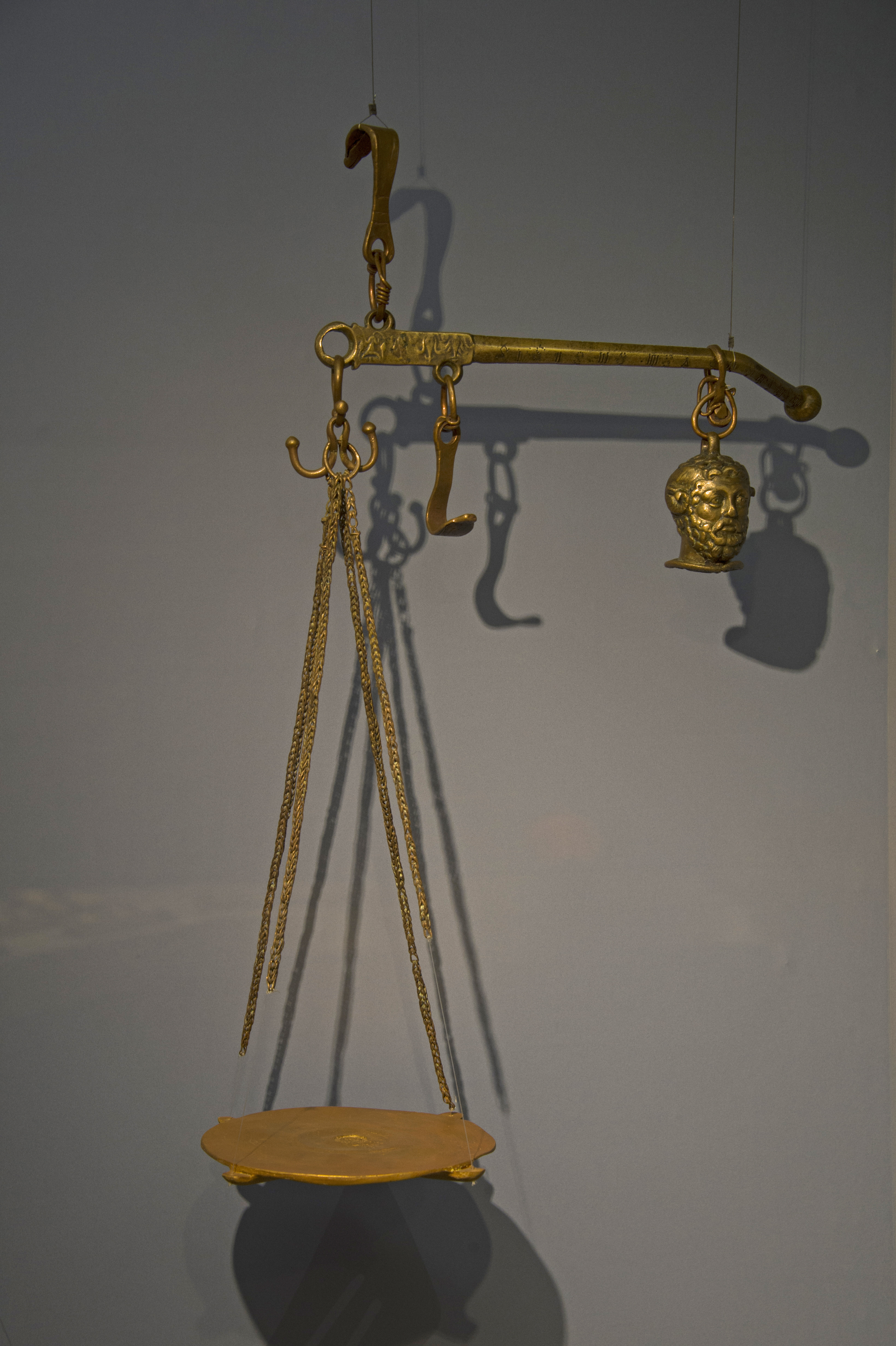
Istanbul Pera museum Anatolian weights and measures Scale

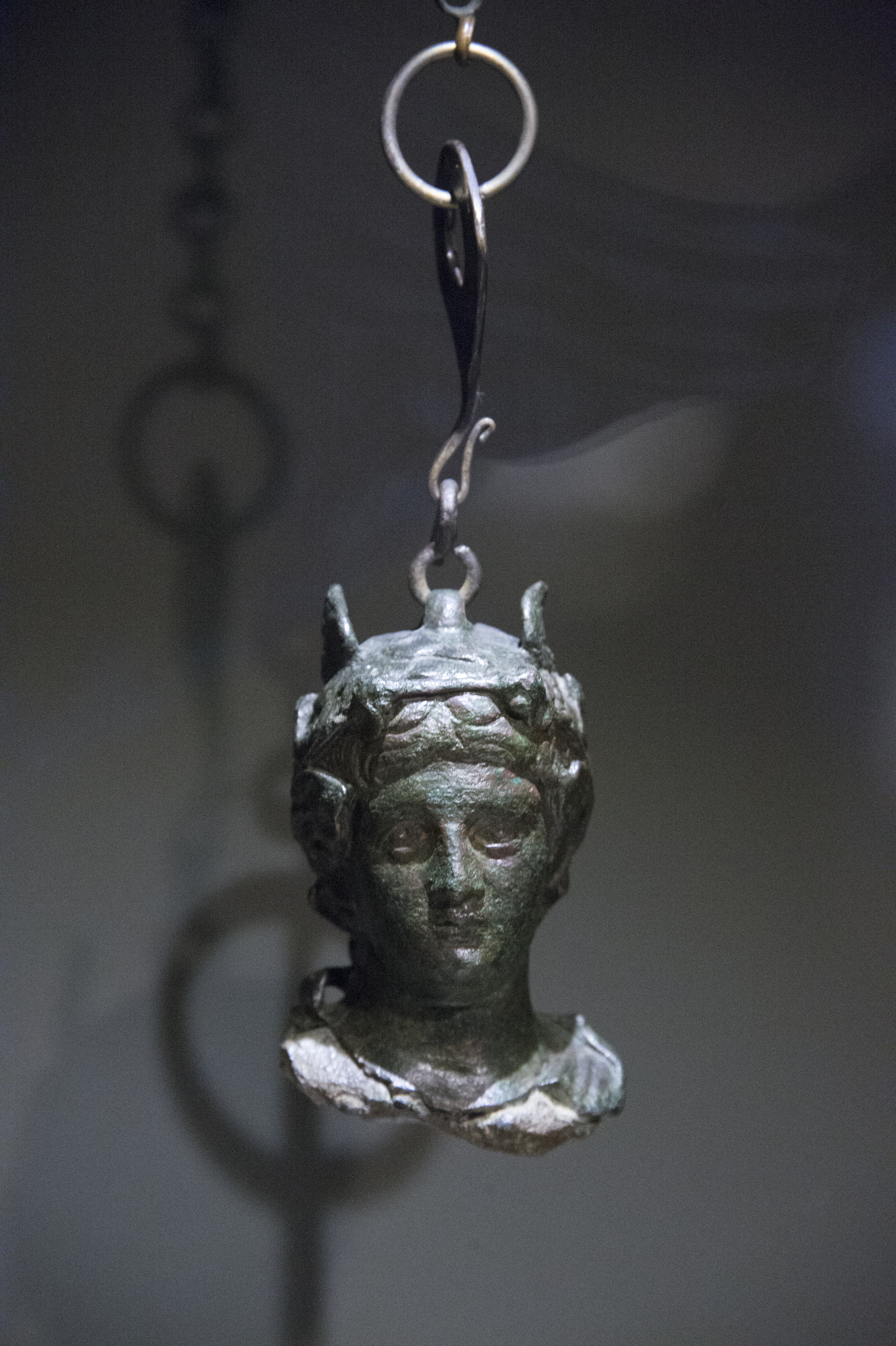
Istanbul Pera museum Anatolian weights and measures Weight

=== Kütahya Tiles and Ceramics Collection ===
The beginnings of the Suna and İnan Kıraç Foundation's Kütahya Tiles and Ceramics Collection date back to 1980s. Today the collection consists of over 800 pieces representing various periods, especially the 18th to 20th centuries. The limited number of pieces on display have been chosen to give a general idea of the collection and the craftsmanship of Kütahya ceramics.

== Temporary exhibitions ==
Having organized joint projects with leading international museums, collections, and foundations including Tate Britain, Centre Pompidou, Victoria and Albert Museum, St. Petersburg Russian State Museum, JP Morgan Chase Collection, New York School of Visual Arts, and the Maeght Foundation, Pera Museum has introduced Turkish audiences to countless internationally acclaimed artists, among them Alberto Giacometti, Jean Dubuffet, Henri Cartier-Bresson, Rembrandt, Niko Pirosmani, Josef Koudelka, Joan Miró, Akira Kurosawa, Marc Chagall, Pablo Picasso, Fernando Botero, Frida Kahlo, Etel Adnan, Diego Rivera, and Goya.

Since its inauguration, Pera Museum collaborates annually with national and international institutions of art and education to hold exhibitions that support young artists.

== Other functions ==
All of the museum's exhibitions are accompanied by books, catalogues, concerts, audio-visual events, and education programs. Through seasonal programs and events, Pera Film offers visitors and film buffs a wide range of screenings that extend from classics and independent movies to animated films and documentaries, as well as special shows paralleling the temporary exhibitions’ themes.

== See also ==
- Great Palace Mosaic Museum
- Istanbul Archaeology Museums
- İstanbul Modern
- Rahmi M. Koç Museum
- Sadberk Hanım Museum
- Sakıp Sabancı Museum
- SantralIstanbul

== Literature ==
- Pera Museum (ed.). Portraits from the Empire. Pera Museum Publications, 2005. 155 p. ISBN 975 9123 -02 - 9
- Pera Museum (ed.). Young Expansion. Pera Museum Publications, 2005. 163 p. ISBN 975 9123 -00-2
