= Armeena Khan =

Pakistani Canadian film and television actress and model

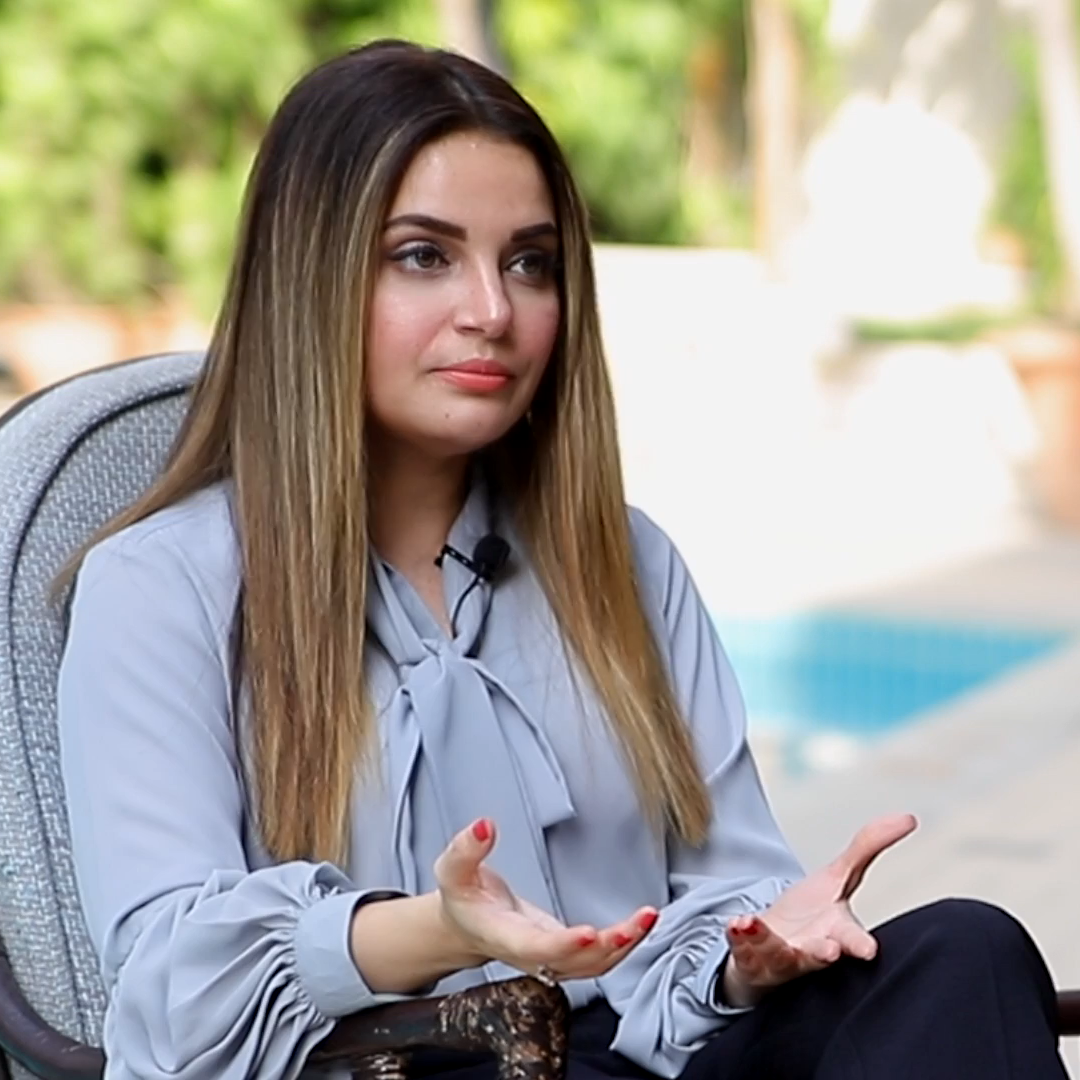
- Khan in 2020
- Born: Armeena Rana Khan; 30 March 1987 (age 39); Toronto, Ontario, Canada
- Education: University of Manchester
- Occupations: Actress, model
- Years active: 2011–present
- Spouse: Fesl Khan (m. 2020)
- Children: 1

Armeena Rana Khan (Urdu: ارمینہ رانا خان pronounced [əɾˈmiːnaː ˈxaːn]) is a Pakistani-Canadian film and television actress and model.

She was born in Toronto to Pakistani parents, was raised in Manchester and earned a Bachelor's degree in business administration from the University of Manchester. She rose to prominence with the role of an antagonist in the romantic television series Muhabbat Ab Nahi Hugi (2014), garnering her a Best Villain nomination at the Hum Awards. She followed it by garnering widespread critical acclaim for her starring roles in the romantic series— Ishq Parast (2015) and Karb (2015).

She, in 2015 and 2016, played a girl next door in the film and television adaption of the novel Bin Roye Ansoo, the former earned her a nomination for the Lux Style Award for Best Supporting Actress. She then starred as the female lead in the romantic comedy Janaan and the war drama Yalghaar, both of which rank among the highest-grossing Pakistani films of all time, and has since played a woman caught in a romantic triangle in Rasm E Duniya (2017) and a troubled wife the social drama Daldal (2017).

== Early life and background ==
Khan was born in Toronto, Ontario, to Pakistani parents. Her father is a businessman, and her mother is a homemaker. She has one brother and two sisters. She is of Pashtun and Punjabi origins. Khan did her schooling from Toronto, however, the family later relocated to Manchester, where she attended the University of Manchester, earning an Honors degree in Business Administration. She later studied method acting at the Ealing Studios and the Pinewood Studios. According to the actress, she holds dual citizenship of Pakistan and Canada. Khan is fluent in English and Urdu and can read Arabic.

Khan pursued modelling in 2010 before becoming an actress. During this time, she worked in commercials for various brands and products, including Nishat Linen, Faysal Bank and Sprite.

== Acting career ==
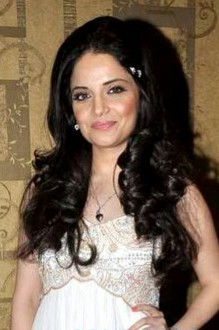
Khan promoting Huff! It's Too Much in 2013

Her first acting role was for the British short film "Writhe", in which Khan played the role of a serial killer. The film was selected for the 2013 Cannes Film Festival. Khan claimed that she was the first Pakistani actress to walk at Cannes in 2013. She then appeared in another short film, titled Stranger Within Me which was screened at the 2014 Cannes Film Festival. Khan starred alongside Azfar Rehman in the sitcom Happily Married which aired in 2013 on ARY Digital. The year 2013 witnessed the broadcasting of Khan's first serious acting performances with the airing of Shab-e-Arzu ka Alam, in which she plays the lead role alongside Mohib Mirza. But it was the television series Muhabbat Ab Nahi Hugi that proved to be a breakthrough for her, and for which she was also nominated for Hum Awards 2015. She then moved on to continue with other TV serials Ishq Parast and Karb playing the lead role alongside Adnan Siddiqui. She made her Bollywood debut in 2013 with Huff! It's Too Much with a lead role in the film.

She became a well-known actress in the country with the 2015 romantic drama film Bin Roye as the lead cast along with Mahira Khan and Humayun Saeed, and was later turned into a drama serial with the same name. Produced by Momina Duraid, the film and the television version were based on the novel Bin Roye Aansu by Farhat Ishtiaq. That same year, she featured alongside Osman Khalid Butt in the music video "Sajna". Sung by Uzair Jaswal and produced by his brother Yasir Jaswal, the single was well received upon release and earned her nationwide recognition. Her other big screen projects include the epic-war drama Yalghaar, a film by Hassan Waqas Rana which is being termed as the most expensive film in the history of Pakistani cinema, and Janaan, a romantic comedy which is directed by Azfar Jafri and co produced by Hareem Farooq, Reham Khan and Imran Raza Kazmi. In November 2016, she was signed for Rasm E Duniya, a television drama that aired on ARY Digital. In 2019, Khan played the leading role in the patriotic war film Sherdil.

In 2025, she made her television comeback after 4 years for Hum TV drama series Meri Tanhai.

== Personal life ==
She announced her engagement to British Pakistani businessman Fesl Reza-Khan on Twitter in July 2017. She revealed that Fesl had proposed to her on the beach in Cuba. Khan married Fesl in a Nikah ceremony in London on 14 February 2020. The couple became parents to a girl, Amelie Isla, in December 2022. Fesl joined the Green Party of England and Wales in 2023; as of 2026 he serves as the party's International Co-ordinator and is the co-chair of Muslim Greens. As a result of the 2026 Manchester City Council election, he was elected one of the three councillors for Levenshulme.

== Filmography ==
Key
†	Denotes films that have not yet been released

=== Film ===
Year	Title	Role	Director	Notes
2013	Writhe	Lily	Sharaz Ali	British short film
2013	Huff! It's Too Much	Ishita	Pushkar Jog	Hindi film
2014	Unforgettable	Ghazal singer	Arshad Yusuf Pathan	Cameo appearance
2015	Bin Roye	Saman Shafiq	Shahzad Kashmiri	
2016	Janaan	Meena Khan	Azfar Jafri	
2017	Yalghaar	Kajo	Hassan Rana	Cameo
2019	Sherdil	Sabrina	Azfar Jafri	

=== Television ===
Year	Title	Role	Network	Director	Notes	Ref(s)
2011	Dolly Aunty Ka Dream Villa	Preeti		Aabis Raza		
2013	Happily Married	Armeena		Wajahat Rauf		
2014	Shab-e-Arzoo Ka Aalam	Kiran		Sohail Javed		
2014	Muhabbat Ab Nahi Hugi	Fizza Arham	Hum TV	Momina Duraid		
2015	Ishq Parast	Dua Zohaib	ARY Digital	Badar Mehmood		
2015	Karb	Haniya	Hum TV	Amna Nawaz Khan		
2016	Bin Roye	Saman Shafiq	Hum TV	Haissam Hussain		
2017	Rasm E Duniya	Haya Harib	ARY Digital	Roomi Insha		
2017	Daldal	Hira Shuja	Hum TV	Siraj-ul-Haque		
2020	Mohabbatain Chahatein	Tara		Ali Hassan		
2025	Meri Tanhai	Ayesha	Hum TV	Meer Sikandar		

== Awards and nominations ==
Year	Award	Category	Work	Result	Ref(s)
2015	3rd Hum Awards	Best Actor in a Negative Role	Muhabbat Ab Nahi Hugi	Nominated	
2016	15th Lux Style Awards	Best Supporting Actress	Bin Roye	Nominated	
2016	2nd Galaxy Lollywood Awards	Best Actor in a Supporting Role Female	Bin Roye	Nominated	
2017	1st International Pakistan Prestige Awards	Best Actress	Janaan	Nominated	
2018	6th Hum Awards	Best Actress - Jury	Daldal	Nominated	
2018	6th Hum Awards	Best Actress - Popular	Daldal	Nominated	
2025	1st Overseas Pakistani Power Awards	Actress of the Year	Meri Tanhai	Won	
