= Bin Roye =

2015 film by Momina Duraid

- Theatrical release poster
- Directed by: Shahzad Kashmiri
- Written by: Farhat Ishtiaq
- Based on: Bin Roye Ansoo by Farhat Ishtiaq
- Produced by: Momina Duraid Shaheryar Akhter
- Starring: Humayun Saeed; Mahira Khan; Armeena Khan
- Cinematography: Farhan Alam
- Edited by: Tanveer
- Music by: Mazhar Cheema; Shani Arshad; Waqar Ali
- Production company: MD Films
- Distributed by: Hum Films (Pakistan); B4U Films (International)
- Release dates: 18 July 2015 (Pakistan and internationally)
- Running time: 120 minutes
- Country: Pakistan
- Language: Urdu
- Budget: Rs. 3.50 crore (US$130,000)
- Box office: Rs. 40.05 crore (US$1.4 million)

Bin Roye (Urdu: بن روئے; transl. Without crying) is a 2015 Pakistani romantic drama film directed by Momina Duraid and Shahzad Kashmiri. The film is produced by Momina Duraid and stars Humayun Saeed, Mahira Khan, Armeena Khan, Zeba Bakhtiar, Javed Sheikh and others. One of the film's songs is produced by Haissam Hussain.

Bin Roye is based on the original novel Bin Roye Ansoo by Farhat Ishtiaq. The film was released worldwide on 18 July 2015, the day of Eid-ul-Fitr. Bin Roye was praised by the critics. It is the tenth-highest-grossing Pakistani film. Bin Roye was later adapted into a television series with the same name, that premiered on Hum TV on 2 October 2016.

== Plot ==
The film starts by introducing Saba Shafiq and Irtaza's relationship. Saba, a lively and bubbly young girl, is hopelessly in love with Irtaza, and he treats her like his best friend. Saba assumes that they both will get married and also shares this with her grandmother. Irtaza is shown to deeply care for Saba and always puts her demands above everything else, coddles her, pampers her, doesn’t want to see her upset, wins games for her and shows her a lot of affection. Irtaza then leaves for the US for two years, where he meets Saman Shafiq, his cousin, and falls in love with her. Saman is Saba's elder sister, and she was given to her uncle and aunt as a child. Saman's foster parents die when a plane headed for Germany crashes, and Irtaza brings her back to Pakistan. Upon learning that she has an elder sister, Saba is at first overjoyed, but her happiness quickly turns to disdain when she learns that Irtaza and Saman are in love and are to be married.

Later, Irtaza and Saman come to Karachi with their son Maaz. On Maaz's birthday, Saman plans to get a birthday cake and some flowers for her mother. However, tragedy occurs as Saman is hit by a car in front of Saba (who once prayed to God that Saman should die, because she wanted to marry Irtaza and hated the fact that her sister was marrying him). Saman dies on the way to the hospital. Before dying, she whispers in Saba's ears that both Irtaza and Maaz are now Saba's. Meanwhile, as Maaz is a child in need of a mother's love, Saba's grandmother suggests to her parents that she should marry Irtaza. Saba doesn't agree, and says yes to marrying someone else. On her wedding day Irtaza finds out that Saba's family is unaware that the man she's marrying is already married and has a son. Irtaza gets very angry and confronts Saba, who cries and tells him that it's too late to stop the wedding now since they are actually at the wedding. However, Irtaza drags her to their family and tells them the truth. Their family is shocked and they decide Saba should not marry that guy. Then, to the surprise of everyone present, Irtaza announces that he will marry Saba. Saba has a difficult time accepting her marriage and was in trauma that she might be the cause of Saman's death, but after a dramatic turn of events, Irtaza finally came to know the whole story and recognized the love of Saba, and declares his love for her. The movie ends with Irtaza and Saba together at last.

== Cast ==
- Humayun Saeed as Irtaza Gazanffar - Saman's ex husband; Saba's husband; Maaz's father.
- Mahira Khan as Saba Shafiq/Saba Irtaza - Maliha and Shafiq's daughter; Saman and Zafar's sister; Irtaza's wife; Safir's ex wife; Maaz's aunt and stepmother.
- Armeena Rana Khan as Saman Shafiq/Saman Irtaza - Maliha and Shafiq's daughter; Saba and Zafar's sister; Irtaza's late wife; Maaz's mother.
- Zeba Bakhtiar as Maliha Shafiq - Shafiq's wife; Saba, Zafar and Saman's mother.
- Javed Sheikh as Shafiq Ahmed - Maliha's husband; Saba, Zafar and Saman's father.
- Jahanzeb Khan as Zafar Shafiq - Maliha and Shafiq's son; Saba and Saman's brother.
- Azra Mansoor as Dadi/Amma - Shafiq's mother; Saba, Irtaza, Zafar and Saman's grandmother.
- Junaid Khan as Safir - Salma's son; Sonia's husband; Saba's ex husband.
- Huma Nawab as Salma - Safeer's mother.
- Adeel Hussain as Himself (special appearance in song "Balle Balle")
- Mujtaba Khan as young Irtaza
- Annie Zaidi as Talat Ansar - Ansar's wife; Saman's Foster mother.
- Rashid Khawaja as Ansar - Talat's husband; Maliha's brother; Saman's Foster father.
- Faiza Hasan as Singer
- Sidra Batool as Shiza - Saba's friend.

== Production ==
=== Development ===
Bin Roye was developed by Hum TV's senior producer Momina Duraid of Momina Duraid Productions, Duraid chose Shehzaad Kashmiri along with herself to direct the film. The story of the film is based on Farhat Ishtiaq's novel, Bin Roye Ansoo. The screenplay is also written by Ishtiaq, while the cinematography is done by Farhan Alam. Song composition is done by Shiraz Uppal, Sahir Ali Bagha, Shani Arshad and Waqr Ali. Two songs in the film have been directed by Sarmad Sultan Khoosat, Asim Raza and Haissam Hussain.

=== Casting ===
Producer Momina Duraid chose Mahira Khan, along with Humayun Saeed and Armeena Rana Khan to portray the leading roles, however Zeba Bakhtiar, Javed Sheikh and Azra Mehmood were selected to portray supporting roles. Mahira Khan, after her success in Humsafar, Shehr-e-Zaat and Bol, was selected to portray the role of Saba. Khan continued with her film Raees and managed to work on Bin Roye. Humayun Saeed was selected to portray the role of the main lead, Irtiza while Armeena Khan, after completing her television series Karb, joined the shoot.

=== Filming ===
Filming began in 2014 and was completed in late March 2015. The film premiered in July 2015, after the completion of filming. Teasers were released in late April which were heavily praised for their shooting and cast while music was released in June 2015. Shooting was extensively done in Karachi, with some chunks being shot in parts of California, United States.

== Music ==
Bin Roye's soundtrack received positive reviews from critics and the public alike. The song "Balle Balle" was on the top of the charts on the Bollywood song website "Saavn" for a week.

#	Title	Lyrics	Composer(s)	Singer(s)
1	"Ballay Ballay"	Shakeen Sohail	Shiraz Uppal	Shiraz Uppal, Harshdeep Kaur
2	"Tery Bin Jeena"	Sabir Zafar	Sahir Ali Bagga	Rahat Fateh Ali Khan, Saleema Jawwad
3	"Chan Chariya"	Sabir Zafar	Shani Arshad	Rekha Bhardwaj
4	"Chan Chariya (Alternative Version)"	Sabir Zafar	Shani Arshad	Rekha Bhardwaj, Momin Durrani
5	"Maula Maula"	Sabir Zafar	Shani Arshad	Abida Parveen, Zeb Bangash
6	"O Yara"	Sabir Zafar	Waqar Ali	Ankit Tiwari
7	"Bin Roye Title Track"	Shakeel Sohail	Shiraz Uppal	Shiraz Uppal

== Release ==
Bin Roye, made at a budget of Rs. 3.5 crore (US$130,000), released in more than 400 screens worldwide on Eid-ul-Fitr, 18 July 2015 under the banner of Hum Films in Pakistan and under B4U Films in international markets excluding Pakistan and the Middle-East. Bin Roye released in more than 10 countries including; the United States, the United Kingdom, Canada, Middle East, and United Arab Emirates on 19 July 2015. Bin Roye initially released in 83 screens in Pakistan but later increased to 89 screens after first two days. Bin Roye was initially set to screen on 60 screens in India, but it was deferred in the state of Maharashtra because of Maharashtra Navnirman Chitrapat Karmachari Sena's protest. Bin Roye also faced release issue in Kolkata, India. Bin Roye released in India in 81 screens on 7 August 2015, making it biggest release ever for Pakistani film in India.

== Reception ==
=== Box office ===
Bin Roye had grossed Rs. 7 crore (US$250,000) worldwide in first four days. Bin Roye grossed Rs. 2.3 crore (US$82,000) in first three days in Pakistan. Film took a very good opening and collected Rs. 0.425 crore (US$15,000) on Day One. Film saw big growth on Day Two as film collected Rs. 0.6 crore (US$21,000) taking two days total to Rs. 1.03 crore (US$37,000). Film saw full house showings at Super Cinemas, Cinestar and Conegold as film recorded 90–95% occupancies at big metros and overall 75+% occupancies which is a very good result. Film showed further growth on Eid Day 3 as film grossed Rs. 0.72 crore (US$26,000) taking Eid Weekend total to Rs. 1.75 crore (US$63,000). On Tuesday film benefited from holiday as film collected Rs. 0.63 crore (US$23,000) and then on Wednesday film had minimal fall despite working day as film netted Rs. 0.58 crore (US$21,000) taking 5 Days total to Rs. 2.96 crore (US$110,000), and subsequently Rs. 3.56 crore (US$130,000) in the first Eid week.

The film collected 3.56 crores in its first week, 7 crores in its second week and 85 lacs in its third week from Pakistan. By the end of its run the film had collected 11 crores approximately from Pakistan. Bin Roye grossed 8.5 crore at U.K. Box Office, 7.35 crores at U.A.E Box Office, 2.4 crores from US Box Office, 50 lacs from Australia and 25 lacs from India at the end of its third weekend. The film had a huge business from the overseas markets due to its big release. According to BOD, the film managed to earn 29.5 crores till third week worldwide.It did a lifetime collection of Rs 105.5 million locally and Rs 295.0 million from overseas, with a worldwide total of Rs 400.5 million.

=== Critical reception ===
Professional ratings
Review scores
Source	Rating
The Guardian	2/5 stars
The National	4/5 stars
The Nation	3.5/5 stars
IBN Live	2.5/5 stars

Mike McCahill of The Guardian termed the film a soppy vortex and gave Bin Roye 2 stars. Ujala Ali Khan of The National gave Bin Roye 4 stars and praised the film. Bindu Rai of Emirates 24/7 praised Mahira Khan's performance but termed 'Bin Roye' as a sob fest. Nadia Lewis of Gulf News also praised the film. Amna Omer of The Nation praised Bin Roye despite its flaws and gave it 3.5 stars. Maliha Rehman of DAWN considered the movie as "a desi version of a chick flick. But a good one and interesting enough for even men to sit through it" she also criticized casting of Humayun Saeed and thought he looked a lot older than his co-stars but praised Mahira Khan for her performance .

Sameeksha Dandriyal of IBN Live praised Mahira Khan for her intense acting but termed Bin roye an average film and gave it 2.5 stars out of 5. Aayan Mirza of Galaxy Lollywood rated the film 3.5 out of 5 stars and wrote, "Bin Roye is a complete family film with its romance and emotion portions excellently stirred up. If you have been a HUM fan in past, this film is for you. Bin Roye may not be at its best at the start of it, but don't lose hope on it just yet. Stick to it, you will go home taking with you some mesmerising performances, some beautiful scenes and some amazingly done songs". He praised the performances of Humayun Saeed, Mahira Khan, Armeena Khan and Javed Sheikh.

Sadiya Azhar of The Express Tribune rated the film 3 out of 5 stars and said, "The first half of the movie was a little slow. However, the second half of the movie managed to pull up the pace and while some scenes were shot brilliantly, some were hazy".

=== Accolades ===
Ceremony	Won	Nominated
15th Lux Style Awards	Mahira Khan – Best Actress; Rahat Fateh Ali Khan – Best Male Singer for "Tere Bina Jeena"; Abida Parveeen – Best Female Singer for "Maula Maula"	Momina Duraid and Shehzad Kashmiri – Best Director; Armeena Rana Khan – Best Supporting Actress; Harshdeep Kaur – Best Female Singer for "Bally Ballay"
2nd Galaxy Lollywood Awards	Mahira Khan – Best Actor in a Leading Role Female; Adeel Hussain – Best Special Appearance; Rahat Fateh Ali Khan – Best Playback Singer Male for "Tere Bina jeena"; Mazhar Cheema, Shani Arshad and Waqar Ali – Best Music; Ballay Ballay – Song of the Year; Mahira Khan – Best Dance Performance for Ballay Ballay	MD Productions – Best Film; Armeena Rana Khan – Best Actor in a Supporting Role Female; Zahid and Shehzad – Best Choreography for Ballay Ballay; Mahira Khan Bangle Scene – Cinematic Moment of the Year
4th Hum Awards	Mahira Khan – Best Film Actress	

== TV adaptation ==
A television series titled Bin Roye Ansoo, aired on Hum TV with the whole cast of the film and based on the novel of same name by Farhat Ishtiaq.
