= Mata-e-Jaan Hai Tu =

Pakistani TV series

- Title screen
- Genre: Drama, Romance
- Based on: Mata-e-Jaan Hai Tu by Farhat Ishtiaq
- Written by: Farhat Ishtiaq
- Directed by: Mehreen Jabbar
- Starring: Sarwat Gilani; Adeel Hussain; Sanam Saeed; Junaid Khan; Ahsan Khan; Javed Sheikh; Hina Khawaja Bayat
- Theme music composer: Waqar Ali
- Opening theme: Mata-e-Jaan Hai Tu written by Momina Duraid performed by Bilal Khan
- Composer: Ziad
- Country of origin: Pakistan
- Original language: Urdu
- No. of episodes: 17

Production
- Producer: Momina Duraid
- Cinematography: Shahzad Kashmiri
- Editors: Kashif Ahmed; Mahmood Ali; Rao Rizwan; Faisal Saleem; Mehreen Jabbar

Original release
- Network: Hum TV
- Release: 2 March – 22 June 2012

Mata-e-Jaan Hai Tu (Urdu: متاع جَاں ہے تو, lit. 'You are the treasure of my soul') is a Pakistani drama television series directed by Mehreen Jabbar, based on a novel of the same name by Farhat Ishtiaq. It was originally aired on Hum TV from March 2, 2012, to June 22, 2012. It stars Sarwat Gilani and Adeel Husain as leads, as the Columbia University students, and the series follows their lives. Sanam Saeed and Junaid Khan played the supporting roles.

The series was among the top ten most searched television series in the year 2012.

== Plot ==
Haniya Sajjad, a.k.a. 'Hani' (Sarwat Gilani) is a Pakistani-American who lives in Chicago with her parents Sajjad and Yasmeen. She is very close to her grandmother Mama Jani who lives in New York and had raised her for years. She along with her sister Yamina plans surprise party for her parents wedding anniversary and also invites Mama Jani. However, Sajjad and Yasmeen meets an accident and dies on the same day.

Weeks after their death, Mama Jani returns to New York and Yamina takes Haniya to her home which Yamina's husband Adam didn't liked. Later, Haniya overhears Adam talking to Yamuna that he doesn't like her stay and decided to go back to her home. Yamina tells her that she can't go back because she sold the house. Haniya argues with Yamina that how could she sold the house without consulting her because both sisters have equal right and share in the property. Yamina tells her that she wanted to financially help Adam and hence sold the house. A disappointed Haniya tells Yamina to keep her share as well and leaves for New York to live with Mama Jani.

On the other hand Ibad Uzair, a.k.a. 'Aabi' (Adeel Husain) lives in Pakistan with his parents Uzair and Hajra. He goes to New York with his best friend Adeel to pursue further studies. Hania and Ibad meet as students at Columbia University, New York and became friends. Haniya and Ibad fall in love. Soon, he proposes to her and meets Mama Jani.

Meanwhile, Yamina and Adam fight constantly. Upon learning of her pregnancy, Adam told her to terminate it. She refused to abort the baby and they fight leading to Adam hitting Yamina. In the fit of rage, she aborts the baby and leaves Adam's house. She decides to take divorce and threatens him. She reveals all this to Haniya and Mama Jani. After Adam's constantly asking for forgiveness, Yamina reconciles with him. However, when Adam tries to do financial fraud with Yamina but she caught him. She regrets giving second chance to him and files for divorce along with asking her parents' property back.

On the other hand, Uzair calls Ibad and tell him that he fixed his engagement with his cousin, Anoushey. This shocks Ibad. He discussed this with Adeel who suggested him to go to Pakistan and reveal about Haniya to his parents. Ibad also informs this to Haniya and promises her that he'll convince his parents for their union. When he arrived back home, his engagement event was being prepared. He informs his parents about his relationship with Haniya. Uzair, forces Ibad for the engagement. Ibad's mother Hajra advises him to get engaged to Anoushey for now for his father's honour until a solution is found. He unwillingly gets engaged to her. Later, he tries to convince Uzair for breaking the engagement and marrying Haniya but he gets angry with him. Meanwhile, Hajra supports Ibad.

However, when Ibad returns to the US, Mama Jani is ailing and has to undergo a risky surgery. Haniya, Yamina and Ibad accompanied her. She asks Ibad to marry Haniya as her last wish, so she doesn't have to worry about her. He calls his parents to convince them, Uzair remains adamant but Hajra gives permission for marriage. Ibad marries Haniya. Mama Jani dies a day after the wedding. Upon learning of Ibad and Hania's marriage, Uzair cuts ties with him ignoring Hajra's pleas. Ibad and Haniya spend some time together and go for honeymoon. Meanwhile, Yamina wins her case against Adam and also got divorced. Ibad visits Pakistan to convince Uzair to accept his marriage. He rebukes Ibad, disowns him and expelled him.

A saddened Ibad, on the way to the airport, rings up Haniya and tells her what has happened. To comfort him, Haniya promises that she will go to Pakistan and gain his father's forgiveness. A while later, to keep her promise to Iabd, Haniya goes to Pakistan. She, there, stays at her uncle's house. She goes to Uzair's office, and gets a job there. She meets Hajra and befriended her. Soon, Haniya started visiting Uzair and Hajra frequently and shared close bond with them. Meanwhile, Yamina's divorce lawyer Shoaib proposed her which she accepted after being reluctant for a while.

One day, Haniya told Hajra that she will be home alone as her uncle and aunt had to go abroad. Hajra and Uzair insist her to live with them until their return. Haniya moved to their home and they started living like a family.

One night, Haniya with a depressed heart, secretly went into Ibad's room. She started crying with great pain and sorrow. Oblivious to the presence of Uziar who followed her.

It is revealed in flashback that the day Uzair had expelled Ibad and he was on his way to airport, his car met with an accident and he had died. Police informs about his death to Uzair and Hajra who were devastated. Upon learning of Ibad's death, Haniya fell ill due to trauma and was hospitalised. She was taken care by Yamina and Adeel. She was mentally disturbed for months. After recovering, she started a job but then remembered Ibad's words and went to Pakistan despite Yamina's opposition.

In the present, Haniya notices that Uzair has saw her in Ibad's room crying. He reveals he knew Haniya's true identity since the day he met her first because he had seen her photo in Ibad's wallet after his death. Uzair expresses his regret for the family's prior stance. Haniya assures him that Ibad held no resentment and would have eventually gained his approval.

Uzair then reveals Hania's real identity to Hajra who thanks her for making Ibad's last days cheerful and gappy. Later, Uzair and Hajra gets worried about Haniya's future and think that she should remarry. They prefer Adeel as perfect match for Haniya and Uzair talk to him.

The drama ends with Haniya, Hajra and Uzair sitting in lawn in midnight watching the moon and stars while Haniya visualises Ibad, who is happy seeing his family together.

== Deviations from the novel ==
Adapting her novel for the television screen, Farhat Ishtiaq has added a new sub-plot and fleshed out some of her original characters. In the TV series, Haniya and Ibad's love story is interwoven with a plot focusing on a married couple, Yamina (Sanam Saeed) and Adam (Junaid Khan). Ibad's best friend Adeel is a minor character in the novel, but his role has been extended for the TV series. He is played onscreen by Ahsan Khan.

== Cast ==
- Sarwat Gillani as Haniya "Hani" Ibad (nee Sajjad): Ibad's wife; Sajjad and Yasmeen's daughter; Yamina's sister.
- Adeel Hussain as Ibad "Aabi" Uzair: Uzair and Hajra's son; Haniya's husband.
- Javed Sheikh as Uzair Farooq: Hajra's husband; Ibad's father; Tariq's brother.
- Hina Khawaja Bayat as Hajra Uzair: Uzair's wife; Ibad's mother.
- Sanam Saeed as Yamina Sajjad (formerly Adam): Adam's ex-wife; Sajjad and Yasmeen's daughter; Hania's sister.
- Junaid Khan as Adam Khalid: Yamina's ex-husband.
- Ahsan Khan as Adeel: Ibad's bestfriend.
- Huma Akbar as Yasmeen Sajjad: Sajjad's wife; Yamina and Haniya's mother.
- Sajida Syed as Mama Jani : Sajjad's mother; Yamina and Haniya's grandmother.
- Syed Mohammad Ahmed as Tariq Farooq: Uzair's brother; Asma's husband; Anoushey's father.
- Humaira Zaheer as Asma Tariq: Tariq's wife; Anoushey's mother.
- Khaula Malik as Catherine: Haniya's bestfriend.
- Aizzah Fatima as Laila: Yamina's friend.
- Rajnish Jaiswal as Shoaib Khan: Yamina's divorce lawyer.
- Qavi Khan as Abdullah: Ibad's neighbour.
- Raju Jamil as Fayaz: Haniya's uncle.
- Shaz Khan as Wick: Adam's friend.

== Reception ==
The drama has received positive reviews from critics who have praised the story and its execution by director Mehreen Jabbar. TV Kahani in its review gave it 3 out of 5 stars: "Over all, Mata-e-Jaan is a decent show, but falls short thanks to the great expectations everyone had from it. The serial would’ve been much better had they paid more attention to the principal cast and twitched things a little. This isn’t a must-watch, but it does have its own sweet moments." The cinematography has also been very well received: "The execution of the scenes is smooth, like the slides that effortlessly slip into place to form a beautiful portrait. That brings us to another reason why this drama is a must watch."

== Accolades ==
Year	Awards	Category	Nominee(s)/ recipient(s)	Result	Ref.
2013	Lux Style Awards	Best TV Track	Bilal Khan	Nominated	

== Broadcasts ==
- Mata-e-Jaan Hai Tu originally premiered on Hum TV from 2 March 2012 to 22 June 2012.
- Rebroadcast as Mata-e-Jaan Hai Tu on Hum Sitaray in Pakistan.
- Broadcast as Tu Hai Meri Jaan on Rishtey in Europe.
- Broadcast as عشق حیاتی on MCB Bollywood in the Middle East.
- Broadcast as Meri Jaan Hai Tu on Zindagi TV in India.
- Broadcast as Mata-e-Jaan Hai Tu on Hum TV Europe and Hum Masala Europe in U.K
- Since mid-2020, it is available for streaming on Hum TV's Official YouTube Channel.
