= Adeel Husain =

Pakistani actor (born 1978)

- عدیل حسین
- Born: Syed Adeel Husain; 30 June 1978 (age 48); Karachi, Pakistan
- Education: Dublin Business School
- Occupations: Actor; Director
- Years active: 2007–Present
- Height: 5 ft 10 in (178 cm)

Adeel Husain (Urdu: عدیل حسین; born 30 June 1978) is a Pakistani actor and director. He is best known for his roles in Mera Naseeb (2011), Mata-e-Jaan Hai Tu (2012), Mohabat Subh Ka Sitara Hai (2013–2014), Jackson Heights (2014–2015) and Daasi (2019).

== Early life and education ==
Born on 30 June 1978 in Karachi, he earned his Masters in marketing from Dublin Business School in Dublin, Ireland.

During his school and college days his hobbies included painting and drawing, which would be instrumental in making his transition towards the entertainment industry as professional option.

== Career ==
=== Acting ===
He started his career in the late 1990s, becoming a part of the City FM's breakfast show and made screen appearances in advertisements, selective TV dramas, music videos, and telefilms like Duniya Goal Hai (2007) that ran at Kara Film Festival, marking his television debut in 2008 with Aa Mera Pyar Ki Khushboo.

=== Direction ===
His first work as director was a car commercial in 2008 for the HBL Car to Car campaign and an unreleased Telecom sector brand entertainment project named Mera Mobile, which he created and directed. He also worked as a cinematographer in a documentary produced by Vizor Studios.

== Filmography ==
=== Films ===
Year	Film	Role	Notes	Ref(s)
2015	Bin Roye	Himself	Secial appearance in the song "Balle Balle"	
2016	Ho Mann Jahaan	Nadir	Film debut	
2016	Dobara Phir Se	Hammad		

=== Television series ===
Year	Serial	Role	Network	Notes	Ref(s)
2008	Aa Mera Pyar Ki Khushboo	Saleem	ARY Digital	Television debut	
2010	Daam	Junaid	ARY Digital		
2011	Mera Naseeb	Shahbaz	Hum TV		
2012	Mata-e-Jaan Hai Tu	Ibad	Hum TV		
2013	Mora Piya	Faisal	Geo Entertainment		
2013	Jiya Na Jaye	Eqaan	Hum TV		
2013	Silvatein	Rayyan	ARY Digital		
2013	Shukk	Ehtesham	Geo Entertainment		
2013	TUC The Lighter Side of Life	Himself	Hum TV	Episode 6	
2014	Mohabat Subh Ka Sitara Hai	Zeeshan	Hum TV		
2014	Jackson Heights	Jamshed	Urdu 1		
2016	Bin Roye	Himself	Hum TV	Episode 6; cameo	
2019	Daasi	Aahil	Hum TV		
2021	Aakhir Kab Tak	Nasir	Hum TV		
2023	Pyari Mona	Babar	Hum TV		
2024	Ghair	Farjaad	ARY Digital		
2025	Doosra Chehra	Hamza	Geo Entertainment	Mini-series	
2026	Sirf Shabana	Kabir Khan	Hum TV		
2026	Doctor Bahu	Dr. Faizan	ARY Digital		

=== Telefilms ===
Year	Serial	Role	Network	Notes	Ref(s)
2007	Dunya Goal Hai	Ayaz Aziz	Geo Entertainment		
2012	Serade	Shehzad Ameen	Geo Entertainment		
2013	Aik Graduation Ki Long Story Short Mein	Rohail	Geo Entertainment		

== Awards and nominations ==
Year	Award	Category	Serial/Film	Result	Ref(s)
2007	Kara Film Festival Awards	Best Male Actor in a Lead Role	Duniya Goal Hai	Nominated	
2007	Kara Film Festival Awards	Special Jury Award for Acting	Duniya Goal Hai	Won	
2011	Pakistan Media Awards	Best New Male Actor	Daam	Won	
2011	Pakistan Media Awards	Best New Male Actor	Mera Naseeb	Nominated	
2011	Pakistan Media Awards	Best Supporting Actor	Mera Naseeb	Nominated	
2015	Hum Awards	Best Actor Popular	Muhabat Subh Ka Sitara Hai	Nominated	
2015	Hum Awards	Best Actor Jury	Muhabat Subh Ka Sitara Hai	Nominated	
2016	Hum Style Awards	Most Stylish Film Actor		Nominated	
2017	Galaxy Lollywood Awards	Best Actor in a Leading Role Male	Dobara Phir Se	Nominated	
2017	Galaxy Lollywood Awards	Best Male Debut	Ho Mann Jahaan	Nominated	
2017	Galaxy Lollywood Awards	Best Dance Performance	Ho Mann Jahaan	Won	
2017	Nigar Awards	Best Debut Male	Ho Mann Jahaan	Won	
2017	Pakistan Excellence Awards	Best Actor	Dobara Phir Se & Ho Mann Jahaan	Won	
2017	Hum Style Awards	Most Stylish Film Actor		Nominated	
