= Bilal Khan (singer) =

Pakistani playback singer, song-writer, composer and actor

Bilal
- Born: 4 October 1986 (age 39); Lahore, Punjab, Pakistan
- Education: Lahore University of Management Sciences, Virginia Commonwealth University
- Occupations: Singer; Songwriter; Composer; Actor
- Years active: 2009–present
- Known for: Bachana (song)
- Notable work: Sammi; Coke Studio; Khamoshi
- Website: bilalkhanmusic.com

Bilal Khan (Urdu: بلال خان, born Bilal Ahmed Khan, 4 October 1986) is a Pakistani musician, actor, and YouTuber. He released his debut album Umeed in 2009. Singles released included "Bachana", "Tou Kia Hua", "Larho Mujhey", "Kabhi Gham Na Aey", and Mata-e-Jaan Hai Tu. In 2012, he was nominated for Best Album at the 11th Lux Style Awards for the album Umeed.

== Early life and education ==
Bilal Khan was born on 4 October 1986. He had love for music from early days, buying guitars and playing music in his very room. He learned to play guitar through various articles on internet. Khan holds a BSc (Hons) degree in Politics and Economics from Lahore University of Management Sciences (LUMS). He later studied at Virginia Commonwealth University's VCU Brandcenter master's programme.

== Music career ==
=== Early career ===
While still studying at Lahore University of Management Sciences (LUMS), Bilal Khan released a song called "Bachana" that was released on YouTube. The song was later played on different music video channels in Pakistan in particular MTV. This earned him Best Singer of 2010 and Best Song of 2010 voted by the Pakistan FM 103.

His first international concert was held in Kuala Lumpur and he has performed in the United Kingdom, US, Canada and United Arab Emirates.

=== Coke Studio (2011–2018) ===
Shortly after his musical career started he was called upon to sing for Coke Studio Season 4, marking his debut in Coke Studio. He performed two songs from his album "Umeed" on Coke Studio Pakistan, "To Kia Hua" and "Lamha". He returned again on Coke Studio Pakistan, in season five, to sing songs from his second album "Maktoob" including "Larho Mujhey" and "Taaray". In 2012, he left for the United States to pursue studies which led to a brief hiatus from singing. He returned to Pakistan in 2016 and restarted his musical career, while also venturing into acting. In addition, he makes vlogs on his YouTube channel. Khan has also performed his own song "Apna Gham" on Coke Studio (season 11) alongside Mishal Khawaja.

=== Playback singing ===
Bilal Khan has sung the official soundtracks of three Hum TV drama's including "Mata-e-Jaan" for Mata-e-Jaan Hai Tu, "Roshan Sitara" along with QB for Roshan Sitara and "Khamoshi" for Khamoshi. He was also nominated for Best singer at the 12th Lux Style Awards for "Mata e Jaan". "Khamoshi" was also nominated for Best Original Soundtrack Popular.

=== Sponsorships ===
Bilal Khan recorded a song for Levi's called Anjaane, along with Zoe Vicajee, to pay tribute to the Pakistani pop-rock band Strings. He also modeled for the Go Forth campaign by Levi's. In 2011 Khan released a tribute to Alamgir by recording the song called "Dekha Na Tha."

== Acting career ==
Khan acted in a telefilm called Tamanna ki Tamanna (2012) as Jazib Khan, that aired on Hum TV. The script was written by Bushra Ansari. It also stars Mathira and Sanam Saeed. It was directed by Siraj-ul-Haq and produced by Momina Duraid.

Khan also acted in the Hum TV drama Sammi (2017) in which he played the role of Aliyaan; Sammi was also his debut drama. He has acted in Hum TV's hit drama serial Khamoshi (2017–2018) as Shahram in the main lead alongside Zara Noor Abbas, Affan Waheed and Iqra Aziz.

== Filmography ==
=== Television ===
Year	Title	Role	Network	Notes
2015	Tamanna Ki Tamanna	Jazib Khan	Hum TV	Telefilm
2017	Sammi	Aliyaan	Hum TV	
2017–2018	Khamoshi	Shahram	Hum TV	
2022	Afrah Tafreeh	Ameer	Hum TV	Telefilm

== Discography ==
=== Albums ===
Year	Title
2011	Umeed
2012	Maktoob
2019	Go 4 it (EP)

==== Umeed ====
Track listing
No.	Title	Length
1.	"Bachana"	03:29
2.	"To Kia Hua"	04:41
3.	"Lamha"	04:16
4.	"Main Aoon Gaa"	03:32
5.	"Taaray"	03:14
6.	"Banda"	03:30
7.	"Taqdeer"	03:39
8.	"Kabhi Gham Na Aey"	03:42

=== Singles ===
Year	Song
2009	"Bachana"
2009	"Khuda"
2011	"Anjaane"
2011	"Dil Main Meray"
2012	"Dekha Na Tha"
2012	"Bhool"
2012	"Mil Hee Gaya"
2012	"Chupee"
2013	"Pyaar"
2013	"Dou Gharhee"
2014	"Lagne Laga"
2015	"Jee Raha Hoon Main"
2016	"Save Me"
2016	"Tooti Baraf"
2017	"Song From A Broken Heart"
2017	"Chorh Day"
2018	"Summer Song"
2018	"Bijleeyan"
2018	"Dekha Tujhay"
2018	"Tera Saath"
2019	"oh oh oh"
2019	"Get Over You"
2019	"Seasons Change"
2019	"Summer Song"
2019	"Crazy"
2019	"Wait For You"
2019	"My Fault"
2019	"You're Not Here"
2019	"No Filter"
2019	"Are You Happy"
2019	"Safarnama"
2019	"Storm"
2020	"Bhool Gaey"
2020	"Lakhan Vich Aik"
2020	"Tum Ho"
2020	"Teri Har Baat"
2020	"Dar Naheen Lagta"
2020	"Gallan Teriyan Mitheeyan"
2021	"Muntazir"
2021	"Marjawan"
2021	"Kese Bhool Sakta Hoon"
2022	"Qurban"
2023	"Sirf Mere Liye"
2023	"Dunya Ka Har Kona"
2023	"Aik Tu"

=== Coke Studio (Pakistan) ===
Year	Season	Song
2011	4	"To Kia Hua"
2011	4	"Lamha"
2012	5	"Larho Mujhey"
2012	5	"Taaray"
2018	11	"Apna Gham"

=== OST ===
Year	Song	Ref.
2012	"Mata-e-Jaan Hai Tu"	
2012	"Roshan Sitara"	
2017	"Khamoshi"	
