= Ti and Ti =

- Release poster
- Directed by: Mrinal Kulkarni
- Starring: Pushkar Jog; Sonalee Kulkarni; Prarthana Behere
- Cinematography: Harshwardhan J Patil
- Edited by: Arjun Mogre
- Music by: Sai-Piyush
- Release date: 8 March 2019
- Country: India
- Language: Marathi

Ti and Ti is a 2019 Indian Marathi-language drama film directed by Mrinal Kulkarni. It stars Pushkar Jog, Sonalee Kulkarni and Prarthana Behere. It was released theatrically on 8 March 2019.

== Synopsis ==
Anay, a young man, is out on a honeymoon with Sai, his newly wedded wife. However, he lands in a dilemma when he comes across his childhood crush, Priyanka, and gets a chance to woo her.

== Cast ==
- Pushkar Jog as Anay
- Sonalee Kulkarni as Priyanka
- Prarthana Behere as Sai
- Siddharth Chandekar
- Vandana Waknis
- Radhika Ingale
- Devendra Saralkar
- Mohan Damale
- Pari Telang
- Shrikar Pitre
- Sanika Kulkarni as Young Priyanka
- Herambh H Dangat
- Dr. Purshottam Shiralkar
- Tom Bonington
- Ishaan Khopkar as Young Anay

== Production ==
Principal photography commenced in January 2018 and Filming also took place in London and filming was completed on 23 April 2018, with official confirmation from film director Mrinal Kulkarni.

== Soundtrack ==
Ti and Ti

Soundtrack album by Sai - Piyush
- Released: 2019
- Recorded: 2019
- Genre: Feature film soundtrack
- Length: 9:23
- Language: Marathi

Official audio
- Ti And Ti- Full Album on YouTube

The film score and soundtrack is composed by Sai-Piyush. The first song "Ghe Jaguni Tu" Sung by Arpita Chakraborty was released on 13 February 2019.

No.	Title	Artist(s)	Length
1.	"Ghe Jaguni Tu"	Gaurav Burse and Arpita Chakraborty	3:20
2.	"Silly Silly"	Rohit Raut, Juilee Jogalekar	3:11
3.	"Khalli Mati"	Avadhoot Gupte	2:52
Total length:			9:23

== Reception ==
Preeti Atulkar from The Times of India wrote "All in all, Ti And Ti is a good watch for those of you looking for a light-hearted film for the weekend". Keyur Seta from Cinestaan.com says "Unfortunately, this hardly happens in Ti And Ti. Any comedic effect generated is quite mild. It is the airport scene in the end that brings some dose of laughter". Ibrahim Afghan from Maharashtra Times wrote "In fact, the experience on the screen of a movie is affecting at a very subconscious and emotional level. But for that it requires honesty and truthfulness. Instead, it has lost its very soul because of the imaginary coercion in its place".
