= Mariam Mirza =

Pakistani television actress, beautician and former banker

- Born: Mariam Tahir; 1975 (age 50–51)
- Occupations: actress, beautician, fashion stylist
- Known for: Aangan; Pakeeza

Mariam Mirza is a Pakistani television actress, beautician and former banker. She is known for her role as Nasreen (Zubia's mother) in Khamoshi which ranked among the highest rated Urdu drama serials of 2017. She is also known for her role as Safeeha in ARY Digital's family drama Aangan.

== Career ==
She owned a beauty salon, which she sold off when she got into acting.

== Filmography ==
=== Television ===
Year	Title	Role	Notes
2015	Aur Tum Meri Mohabbat Ho		
2016	Pakeeza	Aisha Talpur	
2016	Jhoot	Saffiya	
2016	Bandhan		
2016	Lagao		
2016	Gila	Bushra	
2016	Muntazir		
2016	Ghalti		
2016	Be Inteha	Ali's mother	
2016	Zakham		
2017	Dil-e-Nadan		
2017	Tumhari Marium		
2017	Dil-e-Bekhabar	Khalida	
2017	Khamoshi	Nasreen (Zubia's mother)	
2017	Aangan	Safeeha (Aqdas's mother)	
2017	Phir Wohi Mohabbat		
2017	Saanp Seerhi		
2018	Ghar Titli Ka Par	Naheed (Shafaq's mother)	
2018	Ustani Jee	Noman's wife;	Episode 1
2018	Khalish	Afshan	
2018	Band Khirkiyan		
2018	Kabhi Band Kabhi Baja		Episode 24
2018	Seerat		
2019	Hania	Junaid's mother	
2019	Do Bol	Safeena	
2019	Deewar-e-Shab	Sameera Kamal	
2019	Gul-o-Gulzar	Adil’s mother	
2019	Khaas		
2019	Yeh Dil Mera		
2019	Meray Dost Meray Yaar		
2020	Tum Se Kehna Tha	Samina	
2021	Phaans	Saba, Samad's mother	

=== Telefilms ===
Year	Title	Role	Notes
2016	Chaman Ara		
2016	Eid Des Main Eid Pardes Main		
2016	Paak		
2016	Gori Teri Eid		
2016	Dil Jala		
2019	Raja Ki Chandni		
