= Dil-e-Nadaan (TV series) =

Pakistani television series

- Written by: Sajjad Haider Zaidi
- Starring: Momina Khan; Asad Zaman Khan; Abid Ali
- Opening theme: "Dil-e-Nadaan Ki Har Khushi"
- Country of origin: Pakistan
- Original language: Urdu
- No. of episodes: 101

Production
- Production company: Gold Bridge Media

Original release
- Network: Express Entertainment
- Release: 6 November 2017 – 7 May 2018

Dil-e-Nadaan (Urdu: دِلِ ناداں, lit. 'The Unwise Heart') is a Pakistani television series. It is produced by Gold Bridge Media, written by Sajjad Haider Zaidi. It started Momina Khan and Asad Zaman Khan in lead roles. It first aired on Express Entertainment on 6 November 2017 and last aired on 7 May 2018 after completing 101 episodes. The Original soundtrack was performed by Sahir Ali Bagga along with Shumaila Hussain as a co-singer.

== Cast ==
- Momina Khan
- Asad Zaman Khan
- Abid Ali
- Kami Sid
- Nida Mumtaz as Khala
- Mariam Mirza
- Reesham Naqvi
