= Humsafar (novel) =

Book by Farhat Ishtiaq

- First Edition Cover
- Author: Farhat Ishtiaq
- Original title: Urdu: هم سفر
- Language: Urdu
- Genre: Drama, Romance
- Publisher: Ilm-o-Irfan Publishers
- Publication date: 2008
- Publication place: Pakistan
- Media type: Paperback

Humsafar (Urdu: هم سفر) is a 2008 Urdu romantic novel by Farhat Ishtiaq. The novel was first published in 7 parts in Khawateen Digest, a monthly Urdu language magazine, from July 2007 to January 2008. It was later published as a complete novel by Ilm-o-Irfan Publishers. The story revolves around Ashar and Khirad's relationship with their daughter, Hareem, and how she unknowingly bridges the distance that exists between her parents. The novel is written in a retrospective manner and told mostly in flashbacks. The first half of the novel is based mostly on Ashar's reflections and his point of view while the second part is told mainly from Khirad's perspective.

== Plot summary ==
The novel begins with the arrival of a bitter and angry Khirad Hussain at Ashar Hussain's office. Khirad informs Ashar that her daughter Hareem is a patient of congenital heart disease and requires immediate open-heart surgery. As Ashar is Hareem's biological father and a rich businessman, it is Hareem's ll the legal documents (including her current address and phone number) on his desk. Her presence leaves Ashar in a daze, anger and complete shock, and he is so taken aback to see her standing in front of him that he does not realise the weight of all the things she said and left with him. He leaves his office without touching or even looking at all the files and the picture of his daughter.

It is revealed that Ashar has not seen Khirad in almost four and a half years and for unknown reasons (which are revealed later in the novel) she left him heartbroken and filled with anger and he now has nothing but hate for her. Ashar reflects back on the unusual circumstances that lead them to get married without each other's consent, the development of their married life and the passionate love that they shared once a long time ago. The novel then switches to the present where Khirad is eagerly waiting to hear back from Ashar. When he does not contact her for five days, Khirad concludes that he is cruel and vain and all her efforts to contact him are fruitless as they were 4 years ago.

In the meantime, Ashar's friends notice he is extremely distracted at work and at home his mother confronts him that he needs to stop living in the past and he needs to get over Khirad and all the hurt and pain she hurled at him. The next day Ashar goes to the hospital to visit a friend who had a heart attack. While walking towards the door, a toy falls at his feet and a little girl walks to get her toy. When Ashar picks up and hands the toy to her, she puts her hands on her face and exclaims “app papa hain; app photo walay papa hain!” (You are my dad; You are my dad from the picture!). Ashar is extremely confused and turns to look at the mother of the child who is walking towards him who is none other than Khirad. Khirad takes Hareem away towards the cardiologist’s office. Ashar at that moment weighs in on the purpose of Khirad's meeting with him. His anger and hate for Khirad grows even stronger because she kept his child away from him. He was unaware that she was pregnant and had a daughter.

At that moment Ashar decides that he is going to take his daughter with him so Hareem can live with him in a better place, although he can't separate her from her mother as she is too young and extremely sick. He will also provide her with the best treatment possible. Ashar and Khirad tolerate each other for their daughter's sake and start living together in a separate apartment that Ashar rented out for Hareem.

The rest of the story continues to reveal what occurred between Ashar and Khirad, the misunderstandings which lead them to be separated, the intensity of the relationship that they have with Hareem and whether they can ever resolve their differences and understand each other better.

== Themes ==
Ishtiaq states that when she first began to work on the novel, she "wanted to understand if the idea of love is complete without trust."

== Adaptions ==
The novel was adapted into the 2011-2012 drama serial Humsafar, produced by Momina Duraid, directed by Sarmad Sultan Khoosat and aired on Hum TV. It stars Mahira Khan, Fawad Khan and Naveen Waqar in lead roles.

== See also ==
- Humsafar
- Farhat Ishtiaq
