= Rasm E Duniya =

- Genre: Romantic Familydrama
- Written by: Imran Nazir
- Directed by: Roomi Insha (Late)
- Starring: Armeena Khan; Bilal Abbas; Sami Khan; Erum Azam
- No. of episodes: 30

Production
- Producer: Abdullah Seja
- Production company: Idream Entertainment

Original release
- Network: ARY Digital Network
- Release: 16 February – 28 August 2017

Rasm E Duniya (Urdu: رسمِ دنیا, lit. 'The Way of the World') is a 2017 Pakistani romantic drama serial which aired on ARY Digital. It was produced by Abdullah Seja. It was a new drama on Idream Entertainment and was directed by Roomi Insha. It starred Armeena Khan and Sami Khan. The drama serial premiered in 2017.

== Synopsis ==
Two brothers, Harib and Faris, fall in love with the same girl, Haya. Haya and Faris love each other but Harib has his set his eyes on Haya and forcibly marries her. The play also reveals the hidden truth about Faris and Harib's mother Musarat & Haya's father Tabrez who were in love once but didn't get together. However the agony Musarat holds for her past failure will be avenged and thus the commotion begins.

This drama is a combination of betrayal, rebound connection, love, and paranoid affection that takes a journey to menace.

== Cast ==
- Armeena Khan as Haya
- Sami Khan as Harib
- Bilal Abbas as Faaris
- Erum Azam as Haya
- Javed Sheikh as Tabraiz
- Samina Peerzada as Musarrat
- Nida Mumtaz as Bushra
- Diya Mughal as Shaazia
- Dania Enwer as Shiza
- Saba Bukhari
- Ehtesham Ali

== Soundtrack ==
Rasm e duniya Ost sung by Azmat ali. Amika Shael.

== See also ==
- List of programs broadcast by ARY Digital
- 2017 in Pakistani television
