= Pushkar Jog =

Indian actor and dancer (born 1985)

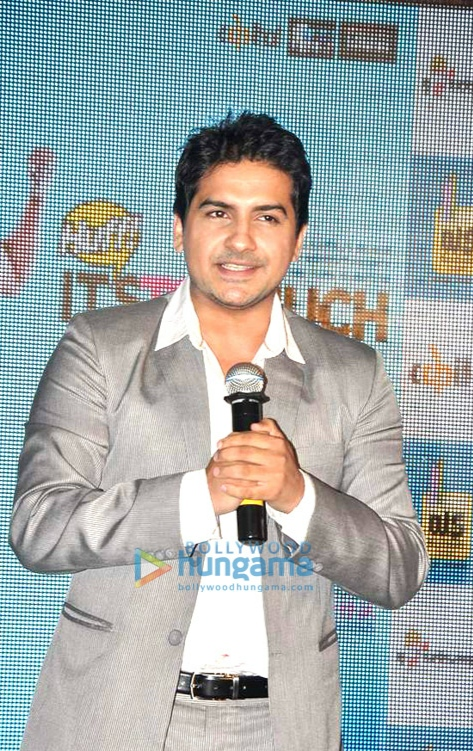
- Jog at release of Huff! It's Too Much
- Born: 15 July 1985 (age 41); Pune, India
- Occupations: Actor; Dancer
- Years active: 1989–present
- Known for: Bigg Boss Marathi 1 Huff! It's Too Much; Jabardast
- Spouse: Jasmine Brahmabhatt (m. 2014)
- Children: Felisha Jog (b.2018)

Pushkar Jog (born 15 July 1985) is an Indian actor and dancer. Who primarily works in Marathi and Hindi films. In 2018, He participated in Bigg Boss Marathi 1 and become Runner-up.

== Career ==
Pushkar was born in Pune, Maharashtra. He did his acting debut at the age of 4. He has a doctor's degree in Dentistry. In 2007, he did his debut Marathi film Jabardast in a lead role. He has also appeared in Hindi films like Goodbuddy Gadbadi, Don't Worry Be Happy, and Huff! It's Too Much. Pushkar also worked in television shows like Nach Baliye Marathi, Tu Tu Main Main and ABP Majha Around The World.. In 2018, He appeared in Bigg Boss Marathi 1 as a contestant.

== Films ==
=== Hindi ===
- Hum Dono
- Aise Bhi Kya Jaldi Hai
- Azmaish
- EMI
- Huff! It's Too Much
- Don't Worry Be Happy
- Goodbuddy Gadabadi
- Human Cocaine

=== Marathi ===
- Vajavu Ka
- Sun Ladki Sasarchi
- Sakharpuda
- Raosaheb
- Zabardast
- Satya
- Mission Possible
- Dhoom Two Dhamaal
- Tukya Tukvila Nagya Nachvila
- Raju
- Psycho Ranga
- Shikhar
- Sasu Cha Swayamvar
- Ti and Ti
- Well Done Baby!
- Adrushya
- Tamasha Live
- Victoria - Ek Rahasya
- Baap Manus
- Musafiraa (also director)
- The AI Dharma Story (As Actor and Director)
- Hardik Shubhechha

== Television ==
Year	Show	Role	Channel	Ref.
1994–1997	Tu Tu Main Main	Episodic role	StarPlus	
1998–1999	Hudd Kar Di	Episodic role	Zee TV	
1998–1999	Reen Ek Do Teen	Episodic role	StarPlus	
2009	Vachan De Tu Mala	Shreyas	Star Pravah	
2010	Maharashtracha Nach Baliye	Contestant	Star Pravah	
2012–2013	Jallosh Suvarnayugacha	Host	ETV Marathi	
2013	Jhunj Marathmoli	Contestant	ETV Marathi	
2013–2014	Asava Sundar Swapnancha Bangla	Nishant	Colors Marathi	
2017	Celebrity Cricket League	Contestant of Veer Marathi		
2018	Bigg Boss Marathi 1	Contestant	Colors Marathi	
2019	Sur Nava Dhyas Nava	Host	Colors Marathi	
2019	Bigg Boss Marathi 2	Guest	Colors Marathi	
2022	Bigg Boss Marathi 4	Guest	Colors Marathi	
2024	Savlyachi Janu Savali	Shrirang (Guest)	Zee Marathi	
2026	Bigg Boss Marathi 6	Guest	Colors Marathi	

=== Web series ===
Year	Series	Role	Ref.
2020	Sanam Hotline	Ishan	
