= Rehaai =

Pakistani television series (2013)

- Genre: Family drama Social issue
- Written by: Farhat Ishtiaq
- Directed by: Mehreen Jabbar
- Starring: Noman Ijaz; Samina Peerzada; Maria Wasti; Danish Taimoor; Yashal Nadeem; Ubaida Ansari
- Country of origin: Pakistan
- Original language: Urdu
- No. of episodes: 15

Production
- Producer: Momina Duraid

Original release
- Network: Hum TV
- Release: 18 March – 24 June 2013

Rehaai (Urdu: رہائی, lit. 'Liberation') is a 2013 Pakistani television drama series directed by Mehreen Jabbar and written by Farhat Ishtiaq. It premiered on Hum TV on 18 March 2013. The series stars Noman Ijaz, Samina Peerzada, Maria Wasti, Adnan Jilani, Rashid Farooqui, Yashal Nadeem, Nausheen Shah, and Danish Taimoor. The series was produced by Kashf Foundation in collaboration with Momina Duraid. It highlights real-life stories of clients of Kashf, a microfinance NGO, focusing on the challenges they face and how they overcome them with the help of small loans.

The drama focuses on child marriage, an endemic issue affecting low-income families in many parts of Pakistan. Its airing sparked widespread debate on child marriage and the Sindh Child Marriage Restraint Act, 2013.

== Plot ==
Rehaai tells the story of Shamim, a woman married off as a child. Her son, Waseem, a brutish man, uses his wife Shehnaz as a punching bag whenever he feels frustrated. Early episodes revolve around Waseem's growing demand for an heir. Although Shehnaz finds an unlikely ally in her mother-in-law Shamim, neighbors frequently visit to remind Shehnaz and Shamim of Shehnaz's inability to bear children. Among these "well-wishers," none is more manipulative than Chacha Inayat, who fuels Waseem's desire for a child.

Inayat proposes a macabre solution: his own preteen daughter, Kulsoom, as a second wife for Waseem, claiming that a younger woman can bear children faster. Waseem accepts the proposal and threatens dire consequences for anyone who opposes him. The story unfolds to reveal the devastating consequences of this child marriage.

Although Kulsoom becomes Waseem's second wife, Shehnaz treats her like a daughter rather than a rival. Akmal, Shamim’s nephew, supports Shamim, Shehnaz, and Kulsoom, despite resistance from his mother. Kulsoom eventually grows up and has three daughters, further angering Waseem. Suspicious of her relationship with Akmal, Waseem beats him and drives the family into worsening poverty. Shamim is forced to work as a maid, enduring ridicule from her neighbors.

Meanwhile, Waseem deserts his family and marries Noor Jahan, who had already been married twice. Their marriage quickly deteriorates, and Waseem finds himself homeless. After joining an illegal gambling operation with an old friend, Waseem is injured in a police raid, leaving him handicapped.

While Waseem spirals downward, Shamim, Shehnaz, and Kulsoom start a successful clothing business. Consumed by jealousy, Waseem lashes out, accusing Shamim of indecency. Shamim confronts him, stating she is ashamed of raising a son who ruined the lives of two women. This moment leads Waseem to repent. He apologizes to Shamim, Shehnaz, and Kulsoom, who forgive him. Waseem then proposes that Kulsoom marry Akmal. Chacha Inayat opposes the idea, but Waseem remains firm.

However, Kulsoom, feeling stigmatized by society, attempts suicide. Soon after, Shehnaz's sister asks for Kulsoom’s daughter's hand in marriage for her son. Shehnaz vehemently opposes the idea, determined to prevent history from repeating itself. Kulsoom’s daughter expresses her desire to become a doctor, and Waseem supports her decision, bringing joy to Shamim. The story concludes on a hopeful note as Shamim gains "rehaai" (freedom) from the oppressive traditions of society.

== Cast ==
- Noman Ijaz as Waseem
- Danish Taimoor as Akmal
- Samina Peerzada as Shamim
- Maria Wasti as Shehnaz
- Adnan Jilani as Rashid (Waseem's dead father, seen in flashbacks)
- Munawar Saeed as Chacha Inayat, Kulsum's father
- Rashid Farooqui
- Seema Seher as Shakra (Akmal's Mother)
- Saniya Shamshad as Kulsoom
- Yashal Nadeem as young Kulsoom
- Nausheen Shah as Noorjahan; Waseem's Love Interest
- Sangeeta as Noorjahan's Mother
- Azra Mohyeddin as Nasreen Phoopo (Akmal's aunt)
- Minal Khan as teenage Shamim (flashbacks)
- Ubaida Ansari as Ammi Jan

== Kashf Foundation ==
Kashf Foundation is a Pakistani wealth management company serving low-income households. Partnering with Farhat Ishtiaq, Mehreen Jabbar, and Momina Duraid, Kashf produced Rehaai to spotlight critical issues such as child marriage, second marriages, domestic violence, lack of education, and economic exclusion. Kashf’s Managing Director, Roshaneh Zafar, called the serial a tribute to the courageous women entrepreneurs of Pakistan who strive to build better lives against all odds.

== International broadcast ==
The show was also selected by the Indian TV channel Zindagi and aired under the same title starting on 13 August 2015.

== Accolades ==
At the 13th Lux Style Awards, Rehaai received the following nominations:

- Best Television Serial – Momina Duraid
- Best Television Writer – Farhat Ishtiaq
- Best Television Director – Mehreen Jabbar
- Best Television Actress, Satellite – Samina Peerzada
- Best Television Actor, Satellite – Nauman Ejaz
