= Jo Bachay Hain Sang Samait Lo =

Pakistani television series

- Genre: Romance drama
- Based on: Jo Bachay Hain Sang Samait Lo by Farhat Ishtiaq
- Written by: Farhat Ishtiaq
- Starring: Ahad Raza Mir; Iqra Aziz; Fawad Khan; Mahira Khan; Ahmed Ali Akbar; Hania Aamir; Sanam Saeed; Maya Ali; Hamza Ali Abbasi; Bilal Ashraf; Khushhal Khan
- Country of origin: Pakistan
- Original language: Urdu
- No. of seasons: 1

Production
- Producer: Momina Duraid
- Production locations: Pakistan; Italy; United Kingdom
- Production company: Momina Duraid Films FZ – LLC

Original release
- Network: Netflix

Jo Bachay Hain Sang Samait Lo (Urdu: جو بچے ہیں سنگ سمیٹ لو, romanised: Jō Bacē Hēṁ Saṅg Samēṭ Lō, lit. 'Gather whatever is left') known internationally as All The Love Our Hearts Carry is an upcoming Pakistani television series and the country's first original Netflix production which is set to release on Netflix from 4th December 2026. The series is based on the Urdu novel of the same name by Farhat Ishtiaq and produced by Momina Duraid.

== Premise ==
The plot centers on Sikandar, a Harvard law student dealing with emotional trauma, and Liza, a gifted artist with a complicated past. Their paths cross in scenic Italy where a connection forms, triggering a journey of self-discovery, love, and healing. The story explores human vulnerability, emotional resilience, and the enduring power of relationships.

== Cast ==
- Ahad Raza Mir as Sikander Shehryar
- Iqra Aziz as Umme Kulsoom aka Liza
- Fawad Khan as Mehmood Akhtar
- Mahira Khan as Rahat
- Hania Aamir as Umme Mariyam aka Sam
- Khushhal Khan as Zain Shehryar
- Sanam Saeed as Vittoria Akhtar
- Maya Ali as Rubina Akhtar
- Hamza Ali Abbasi as Shehryar Khan
- Bilal Ashraf as Waqar Khan
- Ahmed Ali Akbar as Jahanzeb
- Aamina Sheikh
- Nadia Khan

== Production ==
=== Background and writing ===
Farhat Ishtiaq's novel Jo Bachay Hain Sang Samait Lo was initially published in episodes in Khawateen Digest and later released as a hardcover book in 2013. The story revolves around Sikander and Liza, a couple who meet by chance in Italy and fall deeply in love. The title is inspired by a ghazal by renowned Urdu poet Faiz Ahmed Faiz. Ishtiaq's time in Rome, Italy, during her father's posting, influenced the novel's setting and meticulous descriptions of Rome. Ishtiaq also wrote the screenplay.

=== Casting and filming ===
In August 2023, Variety reported that Pakistan's first Netflix original series would be produced by Momina Duraid of Momina Duraid Films FZ – LLC. The lead cast includes Fawad Khan, Mahira Khan, Sanam Saeed, Bilal Ashraf, Maya Ali, Hamza Ali Abbasi, Hania Amir, Ahad Raza Mir, Iqra Aziz, and Khushhal Khan.

Aamina Sheikh was offered a starring role in the series in 2023, and she joined the set in early 2024 in Bahawalpur, and was her return after her acting hiatus. In March 2024, Sanam Saeed announced her pairing with Fawad Khan and wrapped up filming her part in July. Iqra Aziz and Ahad Raza Mir joined the set in Rome, Italy, in May. Fawad Khan's first look was revealed in June, and Nadia Khan joined the cast in October. In December, Mahira Khan revealed in an interview with BBC that her character Rahat, a minor character in the novel, would be substantial in the series, and further added that it is, "something completely new" for her.

=== Post-production and release ===
Director Saife Hassan, who served as a head of post-production besides playing a brief role, revealed in September 2026 that the post-production of the series has been completed and the release date will be announced sooon by the streaming network. In mid-November, the official release date of the trailer and the original soundtrack, 24 November, was revealed. The series come out on December 4, 2026.

== Release ==
Originally slated to premiere in June 2025, the series was delayed for further production refinement. A new release window was expected in late 2025, and was later further pushed to late 2026.

== Reception ==
The series has received widespread pre-release attention from both domestic and international media, particularly due to its notable cast and Netflix's global platform.
