= Huff! It's Too Much =

- Film poster
- Directed by: Pushkar Jog
- Written by: Renu Patel
- Produced by: Goosebumps Entertainment And Sandip Patel
- Starring: Pushkar Jog Armeena Khan
- Edited by: Sandeep Francis
- Music by: Saii Piyush
- Production company: Goosebumps Entertainment
- Release date: 8 November 2013
- Country: India
- Language: Hindi

Huff! It's Too Much is a 2013 Hindi film. It stars Marathi actor Pushkar Jog and Pakistani actress Armeena Khan in lead. The film was directed by Pushkar Jog himself and it released on 8 November 2013.

== Cast ==
- Pushkar Jog
- Armeena Khan
- Omar Khan
- Mona Kiren
- Humayun Zubairi
- Niks Vaja
