= Daldal =

Television series

- Urdu: دلدل
- Genre: Romance; Social drama
- Created by: Momina Duraid
- Developed by: Hum Network
- Written by: Qaisra Hayat
- Directed by: Siraj-ul-Haque
- Presented by: Hum TV; Hum Network; MD Productions
- Starring: Zahid Ahmed; Armeena Khan; Muneeb Butt; Kinza Hashmi
- Theme music composer: Sherry Raza
- Opening theme: Nida Irtiza; Sherry Raza
- Composer: Sherry Raza
- Country of origin: Pakistan
- Original language: Urdu
- No. of seasons: 1
- No. of episodes: 26

Production
- Producer: Momina Duraid
- Production locations: Karachi; London
- Editors: Kashif and Ahmed
- Camera setup: Multi-camera setup

Original release
- Release: 17 August 2017 – 8 February 2018

Daldal (Urdu: دلدل, lit. 'Quicksand') is a Pakistani romantic social drama that aired on Hum TV. The series features Zahid Ahmed, Armeena Khan, Muneeb Butt, and Kinza Hashmi in the lead roles. Daldal explores societal injustices and the issue of illegal migration.

== Plot ==
The story revolves around the themes of illegal migration, dowry, and corruption. Shuja (Zahid Ahmed), a young man from a lower-middle-class family, dreams of moving to London to escape his unsatisfactory life. His mother, Sakeena (Asma Abbas), is highly materialistic and wishes for him to marry a wealthy woman who could provide financial security for their family.

However, Shuja marries his maternal cousin, Hira (Armeena Khan), with the hidden intention of securing immigration through her father, who lives and works in London. Although their marriage is not initially based on love, Shuja and Hira gradually develop a strong mutual understanding and deep love for each other.

After facing numerous challenges, Hira's father finally agrees to facilitate Shuja's immigration. However, in a sudden turn of events, Hira's father passes away the following day, leading to the cancellation of Shuja's immigration process. Left in despair, Shuja grows increasingly frustrated. Determined to achieve his dream by any means necessary, he resolves to reach London through illegal means.

While travelling illegally, Shuja faces numerous hardships and obstacles. His journey to London is long and arduous, filled with life-threatening challenges. He travels from Karachi to Iran, then to Turkey, Greece, France, and finally reaches his destination, London. With no way to turn back, he is forced to continue, knowing that returning would mean facing starvation and other perils.

Shuja travels with a group of men, all of whom endure extreme thirst, hunger, and mental stress. They are constantly threatened by their handlers, who force them to call their families and demand money, or face death. As they fully grasp the dangers of their choices, they realise that they must keep moving forward, as their circumstances are a direct consequence of their own decisions. Hiding in lorries and vans, walking for miles, and constantly faking their identities, they are fully aware of the dire consequences should they be caught.

Upon reaching Turkey, they are given food, water, and new clothes, providing them with momentary relief. Their names are changed, and they are provided with fake passports to continue their journey undetected. This deception is critical for their survival; any mistake could expose them, leading to immediate deportation. Shuja, with his naïve perception of the world, believes that money grows on trees in the West, while in the East, it must be earned through hard work and labour.

In contrast to Shuja, his younger brother Kamran (Muneeb Butt) holds entirely different ideals. Hardworking and honest, Kamran perseveres despite their family's financial struggles and, at a younger age, achieves far more than Shuja.

As Shuja and the group advance towards Greece, they are forced to stay in a container for several days due to a lack of shelter. During this time, Shuja witnesses the tragic death of a woman who had been trapped in the container for over ten days. This horrifying incident leaves him terrified and depressed, pushing his patience to the brink.

Meanwhile, in Pakistan, Kamran is offered a temporary work opportunity in Qatar. At the same time, he becomes involved in the life of Sania (Kinza Hashmi), a woman whose first marriage was called off after her father's arrest. In an act of kindness and to protect her honour, Kamran marries Sania, saving her from social humiliation. His mother, driven by greed, is strongly opposed to this match, as she aspires for her son to marry into a wealthy family. However, his father supports Kamran's decision, admiring his empathy and sense of responsibility.

Shuja finally reaches France. Meanwhile, in Pakistan, news spreads that a truck carrying a container filled with illegal immigrants, similar to Shuja's situation, was fired upon by soldiers. This leaves his family devastated and hopeless. However, Kamran later discovers through the embassy that Shuja is still alive.

In France, Shuja gets into a fight with another immigrant who advises him to stay in France, build a better future there, and forget about reaching London. Later, Shuja apologises, and the immigrant explains the three possible ways to enter the UK.

The first option is to travel by ferry, but there is a high risk of being discovered and thrown into the sea. The second is to cross the border on foot, which could result in being shot. The third is to hide underneath a trailer heading to London, as it is the least likely to be detected. Shuja chooses the third option. He clings underneath a food truck and embarks on the final leg of his perilous journey to London.

Shuja finally arrives in London, the city he had long dreamed of. He is mesmerised by the scenery and immediately calls home, where his mother answers his call. However, his excitement soon fades as he realises that, as an illegal immigrant, finding work is nearly impossible.

Desperate for a job, Shuja meets a man who offers him employment at a hotel for £1,000 per month. However, he soon discovers that the man is attempting to exploit him for illegal activities. Realising the danger, Shuja leaves and is forced to spend the night in a park.

Meanwhile, in Pakistan, Kamran prepares to leave for Qatar. Before departing, he gives some money to Hira, as their mother, Sakeena, does not even allow her to eat properly. When Sakeena finds out, she scolds Kamran for not giving the money to her instead, but he ignores her.

Back in London, Shuja struggles to find work. After meeting another Pakistani at a grocery store, he learns that securing a job requires legal documents. Feeling hopeless, he comes to the painful realisation that coming to London was a grave mistake.

Meanwhile, in Pakistan, Sakeena is furious at Kamran for marrying into a middle-class family instead of a wealthy one, which would have satisfied her greed. Determined to undo his marriage, she contacts a friend and arranges a potential match for him, falsely claiming that he is still unmarried. When Sania hears about this deception, she becomes angry with Kamran.

Meanwhile, in London, Shuja continues his struggle to find a job but repeatedly fails. Hunger sets in, and with no money to buy food, he grows increasingly desperate. While wandering the streets, he comes across a workshop where mechanics are unloading tyres. He offers to help and is paid £5, which he immediately uses to buy food.

In Pakistan, Kamran learns about the marriage proposal arranged by his mother. Determined to set things right, he returns home but first meets Sania to reassure her that he will never leave her. He then confronts his mother about the proposal, leaving her shocked, as she had kept it a secret. For the first time, Kamran's father scolds Sakeena and warns her that if she attempts such deceit again, she will be thrown out of the house.

Back in London, Shuja is still searching for work. After much effort, he finally secures a job at a small restaurant owned by a Sikh. The job pays £200 per month, and he is provided with accommodation. However, to his dismay, the apartment is already occupied by four other men, and the entire building has only one bathroom. Despite the poor living conditions, Shuja has no choice but to adjust.

His first day at work does not go well. Due to the overcrowded bathroom, he is forced to wait in a long queue, making him 10 minutes late for his shift. As a result, £30 is deducted from his salary. Later that day, he accidentally breaks a dish, further angering his employer.

Over time, Shuja makes a shocking discovery—his employer is secretly involved in drug dealing. Despite wanting to report the illegal activity, he realises that doing so would expose his own illegal status, leading to his arrest and deportation. Left with no other option, he chooses to stay quiet and attempts to adapt to his new life.

Meanwhile, the scolding Sakeena received does not deter her from attempting to separate Kamran and Sania. Determined to break their marriage, she visits a black magician, who gives her a cursed paper inscribed with a spell. The magician instructs her to dissolve the paper in a glass of water and make Kamran drink it.

Unbeknownst to Sakeena, Sania's servant witnesses the entire exchange and immediately informs Sania. Alarmed, Sania calls Kamran, who rushes home and catches his mother attempting to mix the cursed paper into his tea.

Meanwhile, Hira continues to struggle in Shuja's absence, enduring constant mistreatment from Sakeena. Her mother-in-law not only takes away her phone but also scolds her for no apparent reason. Distressed by the relentless hostility, Hira decides to stay with her mother for some time to find solace.

When Kamran returns home from work, his mother, Sakeena, behaves unusually, questioning him about his day while simultaneously distracting his sister, Tamana. As Tamana prepares tea for Kamran, Sakeena diverts her attention by telling her that Mubashir is crying and needs her.

Seizing the opportunity, Sakeena begins performing the ritual as instructed by the black magician. However, Kamran arrives just in time and catches her in the act. Confronting his mother, he tells her that what she is doing is wrong. He then firmly states that if she insists on making him drink it, he will do so, as he has faith in God and believes that nothing will happen to him.

In an attempt to cover up her actions, Sakeena lies, claiming that the paper is not a curse but a prayer for his success and well-being. Kamran, however, is already aware of the truth. Choosing not to embarrass his mother, he remains silent.

Eventually, Shuja realises his mistakes and begins to change. His tone towards Hira becomes much softer and more affectionate than before. He is overwhelmed with guilt and anger at himself for coming to London, as despite his father's hard work in educating him, he is unable to secure a decent job due to a lack of legal documents.

A friend advises Shuja to take up another part-time job at a bar, and out of desperation, he agrees. However, one day, a British colleague pressures him into drinking alcohol. Shuja firmly refuses, insisting that it is haram (forbidden in his faith), but his colleague argues that if he wants to work in a pub and serve drinks, he must be willing to drink himself. Despite his resistance, Shuja eventually gives in and gets drunk.

Meanwhile, a Sikh girl named Preet, who once defended Shuja at the pub, develops feelings for him. She frequently visits the pub, follows him to the restaurant, leaves generous tips, and even pays Shuja's Sikh employer to grant him some time off work. Preet comes from a wealthy background and lives independently.

Shuja's friend advises him to take advantage of the situation, suggesting that if he marries Preet for legal documents, he will finally become a legal resident. However, Shuja is reluctant, as he is already married. Despite his initial refusal, he eventually agrees to a paper marriage with Preet. Once married, Preet becomes controlling, refusing to let Shuja send money back to Pakistan. Though he eventually manages to calm her down, a new crisis emerges—Hira is on the verge of a breakdown. The constant emotional distress and mistreatment from Sakeena have driven her to the brink, and Kamran is now taking care of her.

Hira soon discovers that Shuja has married Preet, which devastates her. Feeling betrayed, she loses all faith in Shuja and his family. Her mother advises her to file for divorce, insisting that, in her experience, men who go abroad rarely return, and Hira will never find happiness with Shuja.

Meanwhile, Shuja is deeply unhappy and depressed with his life in London. A friend takes him to meet Faraz, a man who was presumed dead but is actually alive. Faraz confesses that he faked his death because he was involved in illegal drug activities and wanted to protect his family from shame. He advises Shuja to return home before it is too late.

Taking Faraz's advice, Shuja returns to Pakistan and reaches the divorce court just in time. Hira, upon seeing him, decides to withdraw the divorce, and the two reconcile. They finally reunite and live happily ever after.

== Cast ==
- Zahid Ahmed as Shuja
- Armeena Khan as Hira
- Muneeb Butt as Kamran
- Kinza Hashmi as Sania
- Asma Abbas as Sakina
- Abid Ali as Saadat
- Fazila Qazi as Shaheen
- Zuhab Khan as Imran
- Ahson Talish as Faraz
- Laila Wasti as Rukhsana
- Noaman Sami as Fahad
- Sajid Shah as Tahir
- Kubra Khan as Preet Kaur
- Alizeh Shah as Tamanna
- Farah Nadir as Munni
- Sumbul Shahid as Hira's aunt

== Soundtrack ==
Daldal's original soundtrack was performed by Nida Irtiza.

== Production ==
"It's a very interesting story," Zahid Ahmed told Instep. "It tells the story of a man from the lower strata of society who wishes to settle in the West by any means possible. However, once he reaches the West, life isn't as smooth as he expected. From there, the narrative takes an interesting turn as he is forced to do things he never imagined." The scenes depicting Shuja's journey were filmed in each country he passed through, while the rest of the series was filmed in Pakistan.

== Reception ==
Daldal was one of the highest-rated programs of the year it was released. It received strong viewership ratings and proved to be a commercial success.

== See also ==
- 2017 in Pakistani television
