= Azra Mansoor =

Pakistani actress

- Born: 16 February 1950 (age 76); Lahore, Punjab, Pakistan
- Education: Government College for Women, Quetta
- Occupations: Actress; Radio artist; Producer
- Years active: 1967–present
- Children: 4

Azra Mansoor is a Pakistani actress and radio artist. She has been active in the industry for almost six decades and appeared in television series such as Ankahi (1982), Sunehray Din (1991), Alif Allah Aur Insaan (2017), Khamoshi (2017) and Paristan (2022). She also appeared in the film Bin Roye (2015).

== Early life ==
Mansoor was born in Lahore, Pakistan and studied from different cities of the country being the daughter of an army officer. She did her schooling from Convent of Saint Joseph, Comilla and then did her matriculation from Government High School, Malir Town, Karachi. She did her graduation from Women's College, Quetta.

== Career ==
Mansoor made her acting debut with PTV's Kaghaz Ke Phool (1967) in the lead role. She then appeared in PTV classics such as Ankahi (1982) and Sunehray Din (1991). Her recent performances include Bin Roye (2015), Alif Allah Aur Insaan and Khamoshi (both 2017).

== Personal life ==
Azra is married and has four children.

== Filmography ==
=== Television ===
Year	Title	Role	Notes
1967	Kaghaz Ke Phool	Maria	Debut; Lead role
1976	Parchaiyan	Aapa	
1982	Ankahi	Sana's mother	
1986	Jungle	Hameeda	
1991	Sunehray Din	Safeer's mother	
2010	Dastaan	Musarrat's mother	
2012	Koi Meray Dil Say Pouchay	Shahabuddin's mother	
2015	Dil Ka Kia Rung Karun	Zareen's mother	
2015	Diyar-e-Dil	Yasmeen Beddar Khan	
2015	Tum Meri Ho	Rabia	
2016	Heer	Aabis' grandmother	
2016	Bin Roye	Saba and Saman's grandmother	
2017	Pujaran	Tai Jaan	
2017	Alif Allah Aur Insaan	Zaitoon Bano	
2017	Jannat	Bi Jaan	
2017	Badnaam	Nani	
2017	Khamoshi	Bi Jaan	
2017	Malkin	Nagina	
2018	Tabeer	Daadi	
2018	Aatish	Noureen's mother	
2019	Jo Tu Chahey	Aapa Ji	
2020	Sabaat	Miraal's grandmother	
2022	Paristan	Arsam's grandmother	
2023	Mujhay Qabool Nahin	Sultana	
2023	Hum Dono	Di	
2023	Dooriyan	Sarwat	
2024	Jafaa	Ahsan's mother	
2025	SharPasand	Farasat's mother	

=== Film ===
Year	Title	Role	Notes
2015	Bin Roye	Dadi	
