= Bin Roye (TV series) =

2016 Pakistani romantic television series

- Title screen
- Genre: Family drama Serial drama Romantic drama
- Created by: Momina Duraid
- Based on: Bin Roye Ansoo by Farhat Ishtiaq
- Written by: Farhat Ishtiaq
- Directed by: Haissam Hussain; Shahzad Kashmiri; Momina Duraid
- Starring: Humayun Saeed; Mahira Khan; Armeena Khan; Jawed Sheikh
- Theme music composer: Shiraz Uppal
- Opening theme: "Bin Roye" by Shiraz Uppal
- Composer: MAD Music
- Country of origin: Pakistan
- Original language: Urdu
- No. of seasons: 1
- No. of episodes: 17

Production
- Producer: Momina Duraida
- Production locations: Karachi, Pakistan; Dubai, UAE; California, USA
- Cinematography: Farhan Aalam; Salman Razzaq; Rana Kamran; Asad Mumtaz Malik; Zeb Rao; Ilyas Kashmiri
- Editors: Mehmood Ali; Syed Tanveer Alam; Faizan Saleem
- Camera setup: Multi-Camera
- Running time: 40 minutes
- Production company: MD Productions

Original release
- Network: Hum TV
- Release: 2 October 2016 – 22 January 2017

Bin Roye (Urdu: بن روۓ, lit. 'Without Crying') is a 2016 Pakistani romantic-drama television series, which premiered on Hum TV on 2 October 2016. Bin Roye centers on love as it follows the life of Saba Shafiq who, unknown to her cousin Irtaza, deeply loves him but he only thinks of her as a friend. The story follows Saba's obsession with Irtaza, and his marriage with her sister Saman.

Bin Roye was created and produced by Momina Duraid, co-directed by Shahzad Kashmiri and Haissam Hussain and was written by Farhat Ishtiaq based on her novel of similar name. The series aired on Hum TV as part of a night programming all under Duraid's production company. In 2015, a film adaptation of novel, with the same cast and crew was also released, which went on to become the third-highest-grossing film in Pakistan.

Humayun Saeed, Mahira Khan and Armeena Rana Khan reprised their leading roles from the film adaptation, as Irtaza, Saba Shafiq and Saman Shafiq, respectively. Javed Sheikh, Zeba Bakhtiar, Junaid Khan and Jahanzeb Khan also return to series in recurring roles, while Adnan Malik and Saman Ansari joined for television adaptation.

== Synopsis ==
Saba (Mahira Khan) is madly in love with her best friend and cousin Irtaza (Humayun Saeed). Saba and Irtaza have grown up together, and Irtaza cares a lot for Saba. Saba is an extrovert, who lives life to the fullest, and expects Irtaza to fulfil all her childish demands. Irtaza happily does everything Saba asks for and feels happy seeing her happy.

Irtaza decides to go to America for his higher studies. Saba is unhappy hearing about this and gets angry at Irtaza. Irtaza reasons with Saba and tells her he will return in two years. Irtaza goes to America and, whilst studying there, develops feelings for his cousin Saman (Armeena Khan).

After completing his studies, he returns to Pakistan, and Saba is delighted to see him. Soon Saman's parents die in a plane crash, and Saman comes to Pakistan along with Irtaza to her extended family for emotional support. Saba and Irtaza take care of Saman. Soon Saba learns that Saman is not her cousin but her elder sister and that Saman was adopted by her uncle when she was a baby. This fact brings Saba and Saman closer to each other. Both Saman and Saba start sharing a very close sisterly bond. One day, Saba realises that Saman and Irtaza have feelings for each other. Despite loving her sister, she cannot help but feel jealousy and anger.

Soon after Saba's realisation, Irtaza proposes marriage to Saman. Saba is heartbroken but tries her best to be happy for her best friend and sister. Saba happily participates in all wedding rituals. However, Saba loses all patience when she finally sees Saman and Irtaza making their wedding vows. In the heat of the moment, Saba curses Saman.

Saman and Irtiza move to America and soon have a son. Saman dies in an accident, and Saba is guilt-ridden for having cursed her. Saba and Irtiza's families get the duo married. Saba feels guilty and is unable to accept Irtiza as her husband. Irtiza meets with an accident, and Saba confesses her guilt and love for Irtiza. Irtiza consoles Saba and makes her realise that her love has been selfless and Saman's death wasn't Saba's fault. Saba and Irtiza discover their love for each other and decide to give their marriage another chance.

== Cast ==
=== Main cast ===
- Humayun Saeed as Irtaza Gazanffar - Saman's widower; Saba's husband; Maaz's father.
- Mahira Khan as Saba Irtaza (née Shafiq) - Maliha & Shafiq's daughter; Saman & Zafar's sister; Irtaza's wife; Safir's ex wife; Maaz's aunt and stepmother.
- Armeena Rana Khan as Saman Irtaza (née Shafiq) - Maliha & Shafiq's daughter; Saba & Zafar's sister; Irtaza's late wife; Maaz's mother.

=== Recurring cast ===
- Adnan Malik as Aamir - Saba's suitor.
- Javed Sheikh as Shafiq Ahmed - Maliha's husband; Saba, Zafar & Saman's father.
- Zeba Bakhtiar as Maliha Shafiq - Shafiq's wife; Saba, Zafar & Saman's mother.
- Jahanzeb Khan as Zafar Shafiq - Maliha & Shafiq's son; Saba & Saman's brother.
- Junaid Khan as Safir - Salma's son; Sonia's husband; Saba's ex husband.
- Azra Mansoor as Amma - Shafiq & Gazanffar's mother; Saba, Irtaza, Zafar & Saman's grandmother.
- Annie Zaidi as Talat Ansar - Ansar's wife; Saman's foster mother.
- Rashid Khawaja as Ansar - Maliha's brother; Talat's husband; Saman's foster father.
- Shazia Naz as Soniya - Safir's wife.
- Saima Kanwal as Salma - Safir's mother.

=== Guest cast ===
- Zaheen Tahira as Rehmat Bi
- Faiza Hasan as Singer (episode 1)
- Adeel Hussain as a dancer in Ballay Ballay song
- Saman Ansari as Hira, Aamir's sister (cameo)
- Sidra Batool as Shiza (Saba's friend)
- Aadi Khan as flower seller (episode 1)

== Production ==
=== Development ===
In 2013, it was announced that a drama series was being developed based on Farhat Ishtiaq's novel Bin Roye Ansoo, before the project went into development hell for almost half a year. It was later revealed that Bin Roye will be released as a theatrical film and later on as TV series. Actor Humayun Saeed who played the lead role in film revealed, "Bin Roye is a romantic drama. But it will not just be a film; it will also be turned into a serial to be aired on Hum TV with the same cast."

In July 2015, after the release of film, the drama serial went into production with the same cast and crew, with Haissam Hussain replacing Momina Duraid as a co-director with Shahzad Kashmiri. Farhat Ishtiaq wrote the screenplay for the series, changing several plot details in contrast to the film. In an interview she explained, "Bin Roye the drama has the same cast as in the movie, but things which were not included in the movie from the novel will be seen in drama. The shoot is done and most probably will on air somewhere between April and July of this year." This became Farhat's second consecutive collaboration with Duraid in a year and seventh overall, she recently worked on Diyar-e-Dil (2015) and Udaari (2016), which were the highest-rated and critically acclaimed serials.

In June 2016, it was confirmed that Shiraz Uppal would compose music for the series, who also composed three songs for the film adaptation. In August 2016, Ishtiaq announced that the series would replace, her then-running series Udaari and confirmed earlier saying "the play will air this year as the last edits are in process."

=== Casting ===
All the cast members from the film reprise their roles, with Humayun Saeed returning in role of Irtaza, Mahira Khan as Saba and Armeena Rana Khan reprise her role as Saman. Initially it was circulated that Fawad Khan and Sanam Baloch has replaced Saeed and Rana in lead roles, before being confirmed by Duraid in August 2016 that no changes has been made in cast. Describing his role differences from film, Humayun said, "there's already a lot of difference between film and TV. In 2 and half hours, we already have to show a very large story in a limited time in a film, but when it comes to television, we personally like the way the story is narrated. Thus, the progression is completely different; you will get to see a lot that you weren't able to see before. You will find a lot more depth in a few characters, plus, a lot more answers to those unanswered questions. Of course, in a series of 20 episodes, a lot changes." While Khan expressed, "It's not really different. Well, there's a whole new track in it which wasn't in the original, so that's new (Laughs)! Saba is the same, I mean, the variation you would see is that you will see a lot more shades to her. Of course, Bin Roye was just 1 hour and 58 minutes, so you will get to see a lot more intricacies in this."

== Episodes ==
No.	Title	Directed by	Written by	Original release date
1	"Bin Roye Episode 1"	Haissam Hussain; Shahzad Kashmiri; Momina Duraid	Shiraz Uppal	2 October 2016
Episodic reference:
2	"Bin Roye Episode 2"	Haissam Hussain; Shahzad Kashmiri; Momina Duraid	Shiraz Uppal	9 October 2016
Episodic reference:
3	"Bin Roye Episode 3"	Haissam Hussain; Shahzad Kashmiri; Momina Duraid	Shiraz Uppal	16 October 2016
Episodic reference:
4	"Bin Roye Episode 4"	Haissam Hussain; Shahzad Kashmiri; Momina Duraid	Shiraz Uppal	23 October 2016
Episodic reference:
5	"Bin Roye Episode 5"	Haissam Hussain; Shahzad Kashmiri; Momina Duraid	Shiraz Uppal	30 October 2016
Episodic reference:
6	"Bin Roye Episode 6"	Haissam Hussain; Shahzad Kashmiri; Momina Duraid	Shiraz Uppal	6 November 2016
Episodic reference:
7	"Bin Roye Episode 7"	Haissam Hussain; Shahzad Kashmiri; Momina Duraid	Shiraz Uppal	13 November 2016
Episodic reference:
8	"Bin Roye Episode 8"	Haissam Hussain; Shahzad Kashmiri; Momina Duraid	Shiraz Uppal	20 November 2016
Episodic reference:
9	"Bin Roye Episode 9"	Haissam Hussain; Shahzad Kashmiri; Momina Duraid	Shiraz Uppal	27 November 2016
Episodic reference:
10	"Bin Roye Episode 10"	Haissam Hussain; Shahzad Kashmiri; Momina Duraid	Shiraz Uppal	4 December 2016
Episodic reference:
11	"Bin Roye Episode 11"	Haissam Hussain; Shahzad Kashmiri; Momina Duraid	Shiraz Uppal	11 December 2016
Episodic reference:
12	"Bin Roye Episode 12"	Haissam Hussain; Shahzad Kashmiri; Momina Duraid	Shiraz Uppal	18 December 2016
Episodic reference:
13	"Bin Roye Episode 13"	Haissam Hussain; Shahzad Kashmiri; Momina Duraid	Shiraz Uppal	25 December 2016
Episodic reference:
14	"Bin Roye Episode 14"	Haissam Hussain; Shahzad Kashmiri; Momina Duraid	Shiraz Uppal	1 January 2017
Episodic reference:
15	"Bin Roye Episode 15"	Haissam Hussain; Shahzad Kashmiri; Momina Duraid	Shiraz Uppal	8 January 2017
Episodic reference:
16	"Bin Roye Episode 16"	Haissam Hussain; Shahzad Kashmiri; Momina Duraid	Shiraz Uppal	15 January 2017
Episodic reference:
17	"Bin Roye Episode 17"	Haissam Hussain; Shahzad Kashmiri; Momina Duraid	Shiraz Uppal	22 January 2017
Episodic reference:

== Music ==
The soundtrack of the series is adapted from the film. The original soundtrack of the series is "Bin Roye", that is penned by Shakeel Sohail, and composed and sung by Shiraz Uppal.

Track listing
No.	Title	Lyrics	Singer(s)	Length
2.	"Bin Roye"	Shakeel Sohail	Shiraz Uppal	4:30
3.	"Ballay Ballay"	Shakeel Sohail	Shiraz Uppal, Harshdeep Kaur	4:08
4.	"Tery Bin Jeena"	Sabir Zafar	Rahat Fateh Ali Khan, Saleema Jawwad	3:57
5.	"Chan Chariya"	Sabir Zafar	Rekha Bhardwaj	3:42
6.	"Maula Maula"	Sabir Zafar	Abida Parveen, Zeb Bangash	4:03
7.	"O Yara"	Sabir Zafar	Ankit Tiwari	3:35

== Broadcast and release ==
Bin Roye was originally scheduled to release between April–July 2016, but latter it was announced that it would be released after 2016 Eid-ul-Adha. In August 2016, first trailer for series was released and on 20 September 2016 it was announced that series would on air its pilot episode on 2 October 2016, airing weekly episode on Sundays at 8:00 pm. The show was also released on the iflix app along with some other shows of Hum TV in 2017 but on terminating the contract with app all the episodes were pulled off. In 2019, it was released on Starzplay app. The show is also available on MX Player app and since mid 2020, the show is also streaming on ZEE5.

== Reception ==
=== Critical reception ===
Bin Roye received positive reviews with most praising Humayun Saeed's performance. Writing for Dawn News, Sheeba Khan wrote, "Bin Roye's TV version fills in plot holes the movie couldn't" and expressed "Humayun Saeed was flawless and his chemistry with Mahira Khan was very evident. He easily fit the typical Farhat Ishtiaq character: kind, really good-looking, and successful. The comfort level and the bond that needed to be shown between Saba and Irtaza was easily visualized, thanks to the directors and actors." Saira Khan of HipInPakistan praised Humayun Saeed's performance, saying "He is the undisputed king of romantic plays. No other actor can play a romantic hero as well as him" and also praised Mahira Khan's performance.

=== Ratings ===
The rating of Bin Roye (blockbuster) made a huge impact in UK. According to BizAsia, the first episode of the series was watched by 65,200 viewers at 20:00 – peaking at 94,300 viewers. The Sunday night slot on the channel is proving a success for the channel after the departure of ‘Udaari’ last week. The drama gained several other high ratings both in Pakistan and U.K. throughout the 17 weeks it aired.

== See also ==
- 2016 in Pakistani television
- List of programs broadcast by Hum TV
