= Mora Piya =

Pakistani TV drama serial

- Also known as: Piya Re
- Genre: Drama
- Starring: Aamina Sheikh; Adeel Husain
- Country of origin: Pakistan
- Original language: Urdu

Production
- Running time: 40 minutes

Original release
- Network: Geo TV
- Release: 2 December 2011 – 3 March 2012

Mora Piya (Urdu: مورا پيا, lit. 'My love') is a 2013 Pakistani drama serial broadcast on Geo TV. It is written by Mohsin Ali, directed by Anjum Shahzad and stars Aamina Sheikh and Adeel Husain as leads.

== Plot ==
It tells the tale of Faisal (Adeel Hussain) and Ujala (Amina Sheikh). Faisal is an investigative journalist researching a land mafia case. The night their wedding takes place, Faisal and Ujala receive a call from Faisal's boss informing them about Ali's death, a cameraman working with Faisal on the case. On their way to the hospital, the goons behind the land mafia stop their car and kidnap them. As revenge for reporting their illegal activities, a gangster rapes Ujala.

Problems arise between Ujaala and Faisal when Ujaala gets pregnant due to the rape. At first, Ujaala and Faisal think that Ujaala should abort the baby, but later Ujaala feels that aborting the baby is wrong. Faisal and Ujaala argue continuously due to this. Eventually, Faisal agrees.

Ujaala gives birth to a boy, who is named Azaan. The tension between Ujaala and Faisal continues as Faisal cannot accept Azaan, But cannot let go of Ujaala either, as he loves her. Faisal keeps avoiding Azaan and always puts up the reason as work.

Four years pass, and Azaan is four years old and thinks his father doesn't love him. After an argument between Ujaala and Faisal, Ujaala leaves Azaan with Faisal, leaving behind a letter stating Azaan is now Faisal's responsibility. But later, Ujaala returns when Azaan gets lost due to Faisal. Azaan is found by the police, who take him to his grandfather. Ujaala and Faisal's parents get angry at them for being unable to care for Azaan. Eventually, Faisal confesses only to his father that Azaan is not his son and all the events that changed his and Ujaala's life. But Faisal's father doesn't blame Azaan and accepts him wholeheartedly.

On Faisal's insistence, his father convinces Ujaala to send Azaan to a boarding school. Ujaala reluctantly agrees. Azaan is sent to a Boarding School. Faisal eventually realizes that no matter how much he tries to push Azaan away from their life, it is not possible as Ujaala loves Azaan wholeheartedly. Ujaala also shows the letters and cards that Azaan makes for Faisal on Father's Day. Faisal realizes that Azaan is not at fault. Unable to face the guilt, he decides to leave for England, but before going, he brings Azaan back from Boarding School on Azaan's birthday, which makes Azaan and Ujaala happy. When Faisal is about to leave, Azaan comes running and tells him not to go. Faisal agrees. Faisal accepts Azaan wholeheartedly, and Ujaala gets happy seeing the duo. In the last scene, Faisal is shown playing football with Azaan, as Ujaala watches them. Ujaala is shown to be pregnant. The trio unites, and the show ends on a happy note.

== Cast ==
- Aamina Sheikh as Ujaala
- Adeel Hussain as Faisal
- Firdous Jamal
- Manzoor Qureshi
- Parveen Malik
- Ismat Iqbal
- Benita David

== Production ==
Sheikh revealed that she agreed to do the project because the makers had the sensitivity to deal with the story's intense and dark theme in a believable way.

== Critical reception ==
Hailing it as an "excellent effort", a reviewer from the Dawn praised the series for focusing on the internal struggles of a married couple rather than blaming external factors like interfering in-laws.
