= Meri Tanhai =

2024-25 Pakistani television series

- Genre: Romance; Drama; Betrayal
- Written by: Shazia Atta Humayun
- Directed by: Meer Sikandar
- Starring: Kubra Khan; Azaan Sami Khan; Armeena Rana Khan; Syed Jibran
- Country of origin: Pakistan
- Original language: Urdu
- No. of episodes: 27

Production
- Producer: Momina Duraid
- Camera setup: Multi-camera setup
- Running time: Approximately 40–42 minutes
- Production company: Momina Duraid Productions

Original release
- Network: Hum TV
- Release: 30 December 2024 – 14 July 2025

Meri Tanhai is a Pakistani Urdu-language television drama series that premiered on Hum TV on 30 December 2024. Created by MD Productions and produced by Momina Duraid, the series was written by Shazia Atta Humayun under the script supervision of Farhat Ishtiaq, and directed by Meer Sikandar. The story follows two isolated individuals whose lives intersect, exploring themes of love, betrayal, and emotional isolation.

== Premise ==
The narrative centers on Mary (played by Kubra Khan), a young woman deeply scarred by her father's abandonment and her mother’s subsequent death. Across town lives Khizar (Azaan Sami Khan), the nephew of Ali (Syed Jibran), a man remorseful over betraying his first wife and daughter. Khizar hopes to reunite Ali with his estranged family and in the process, meets Mary. As their bond grows, Mary must confront painful truths about her past and determine if reconciliation is possible.

== Cast ==
- Kubra Khan as Maryam Ali Murat aka Mary : Ayesha and Ali's daughter; Khizer's wife.
- Azaan Sami Khan as Khizar : Maleeha's ex fiancé; Maryam's husband.
- Syed Jibran as Ali Murat : Ayesha's widower; Maryam's father.
- Armeena Rana Khan as Ayesha Ali Murat - Ali's wife; Maryam's mother. (Dead)
- Javed Sheikh as Khizer, Maleeha and Maryam's grandfather.
- Uzma Hassan as DD : Maryam's aunt
- Hassan Niazi as Anwer : Maleeha's father; Kaneez's husband.
- Zainab Qayyum as Kaneez Fatima : Anwer's wife; Ali's sister; Maleeha's mother.
- Saleem Sheikh as Khizer's father; Ali and Kaneez's brother.
- Ameema Saleem Khan as Maleeha Anwer : Kaneez's daughter; Khizer's ex fiancée.
- Shermeen Ali as Tahira : Khizar's sister
- Uzma Beg as Khizer's mother.

== Production ==
The series was filmed in urban Pakistani settings with selective segments shot in London. The teaser was released on 13 December 2024 and featured Kubra and Azaan, setting a reflective tone befitting the theme of solitude and connection.

== Broadcast ==
Premiering on 30 December 2024, "Meri Tanhai" aired every Monday at 8:00 PM (PKT) on Hum TV. The 11th and final episode was broadcast on 10 March 2025. Episodes were later made available via Hum TV’s YouTube channel and official app.

== Reception ==
The series drew attention for its emotional core and performances. Critics highlighted the leads' chemistry and Kubra Khan’s portrayal of grief-stricken Mary, while some pointed to pacing issues in the mid-season. Online discussions noted a mix of praise and criticism—some viewers found the narrative "enjoyable despite its shortcomings" whereas others criticized script execution.

Zainab Mossadiq of DAWN Images noted an extraordinary character played by Ameena Saleem, who suffers the heartbreak of losing her loved one due to long distance.

== Awards and nominations ==
| Year | Award | Category | Recipient(s) / Nominee(s) | Result | Ref(s) |
|---|---|---|---|---|---|
| 2025 | 1st Overseas Pakistani Power Awards | Actress of the Year | Armeena Khan | Won | |
