= Khamoshi (TV series) =

Pakistani television series

- Left to right: Iqra Aziz, Affan Waheed, Zara Noor Abbas, Bilal Khan
- Genre: Serial drama; Romantic drama
- Written by: Aliya Bukhari
- Directed by: Ilyas Kashmiri
- Starring: Zara Noor Abbas; Affan Waheed; Iqra Aziz; Bilal Khan
- Theme music composer: Atif Ali
- Opening theme: "Khamoshi"; Singer(s); Bilal Khan & Shumaila Khan; Lyrics by Major Imam Raza
- Country of origin: Pakistan
- Original language: Urdu
- No. of seasons: 1
- No. of episodes: 35

Production
- Producer: Momina Duraid Productions
- Cinematography: Shehzad Baloch

Original release
- Network: Hum TV, Hum Network Limited
- Release: 23 September 2017 – 2 June 2018

Khamoshi (Urdu: خاموشی, lit. 'Silence') is a Pakistani romantic drama television series aired on Hum TV during 2017–2018. It is produced by Momina Duraid under their banner MD Productions. It stars Zara Noor Abbas, Bilal Khan, Iqra Aziz and Affan Waheed. It received critical acclaim, became a breakthrough for Abbas, and was one of the most-watched Pakistani series of 2017.

== Plot summary ==
The series follows the story of Arsala (Zara Noor Abbas), a middle-class girl who wants to do something for her family, despite knowing that her greedy father and envious sister consider Arsala a misfortune. It also focuses on changing relationships and love triangles between Arsala, Atif, Shahram and Naeema.

== Synopsis ==
The serial revolves around two sisters, Arsala (Zara Noor Abbas) and Naeema (Iqra Aziz), who are poles apart in their personality and attitude towards life. The elder Arsala is a simple and trusting girl, while the younger Naeema is greedy and a miser who is jealous of Arsala. Their brother Guddu (Fazal Husain) is also very simple and supports and respects Arsala. Arsala is engaged to Atif (Affan Waheed), and Naeema also likes him, so she strives to separate them. Their father, Sabir (Tauqeer Nasir), works in a factory but his wages are not enough to meet the family's expenses. Sabir catches Atif and Arsala talking alone at his home. He breaks off their engagement and sends Arsala to his relative Mudasir (Javaid Iqbal)'s house as a maid for 30,000 rupees monthly salary. Haseena (Ambar Wajid) is Muddasdir's wife. Haseena's attitude towards Arsala is not good. She always teases Arsala. Haseena's best friend (Rashida Tabassum) requests her to give Arsala to her as a maid after she leaves their job and says she will double her salary. Haseena agrees to it as both had to go to Canada for Haseena's treatment.

Arsala comes to her home as she thinks her parents will keep her, but she sees both, Naeema and Atif marrying. In the morning, Atif tells Arsala that he hates her because she forgot about their love. Atif goes to the office without meeting Naeema. Naeema acts harshly and warns Arsala to leave home. While Arsala, without any choice, leaves her home and goes to work in (Rashida Tabassum)'s house, where her employer Jamal (Saifee Hasan) becomes attracted to her. He harasses her, but she chooses not to tell her mistress. One day, her mistress finds them both in the kitchen, where Jamaal had been harassing Arsala. She then requests Arsala to leave, as Jamaal will torture her again. Arsala leaves in silence and goes to Haseena's home, who has their flight to Canada after three hours. She requested Haseena to get her to any house or institution where she could earn money. Haseena sends her to Bi Jaan (Azra Mansoor)'s home. Bi Jaan lives with a son Basit (Mohsin Geelani), a daughter-in-law Nasreen (Mariam Mirza), and a granddaughter Zubiya (Zahra Shah). Shahram (Bilal Khan) is Nasreen's cousin's son and often visits their house. He is quite close to Bi Jaan. She introduces Arsala to Shahram. Shahram falls madly in love with Arsala. He helps Arsala's family with Naeema's marriage by sending five lakh rupees to her family by using Bi Jaan's name. He sees Arsala crying twice, which leaves him curious. He asks Bi Jaan about Arsala and learns about Arsala's past, which leaves him in complete shock. Meanwhile, preparations and functions had started in Sabir's house for Naeema's marriage.

Shahram arrives at Sabir's house and meets Sabir a day before Nikah. He pleases Sabir by saying he will grant Sabir's wishes if he marries Arsala to Atif. Sabir talks to Atif and his family and convinces Atif. He does it all in the greed of money. When Naeema learns of this, she creates a big scene in which her mother also supports her, and both of them blame Arsala that she has changed everyone with her money, but Arsala refuses and tells Atif to marry Naeema. Later, her Abba informs her that Shahram was behind all of this, and he also paid a big amount to her father. She leaves for Karachi, but her father tells Shahram about all of this, and he reaches the bus station where Arsala is waiting for the bus. They are about to leave together when Atif confronts them. He tries to stop Arsala, but Arsala rejects him. Seeing Arsala with a rich man (Shahram), Atif gets furious and tells Arsala to leave and never return because she is greedy and he hates her. Heartbroken, Arsala goes with Shahram. After Arsala leaves, Atif marries Naeema.

On their way back to Karachi, Shahram tries to explain himself, but Arsala is very angry. She says that he has no right to interfere in her life. She tells Shahram that now she has no place for Atif in her life. When they both reach Karachi, at Bijaan's house, Zubiya and Nasreen are frustrated when they learn that Arsala came to Karachi with Shahram and warns Arsala not to get any expectations from Shahram. On the other hand, Shahram is relaxed and happy and, on being advised by his assistant Safdar to do what he wants, he goes to Bi Jaan, where he meets Nasreen and Zubiya. He tells them he is there because he wants to talk to Bi Jaan about something special. Nasreen and Zubiya think he might propose to Zubiya, but when Bi Jaan arrives, he asks for Arsala's hand in marriage. All of them are in shock, but Shahram remains determined to marry Arsala.

Everyone gets angry at Bi Jaan and asks Arsala to leave their house. They suggest and scold Bi Jaan not to support and encourage Arsala. Arsala leaves Bi Jaan's home and starts looking for a new shelter. She comes across a women's welfare institution where women and girls learn to stitch suits and costumes and do a small amount of business. Arsala requests the social worker (Tahseen) to let her work and provide shelter. The social worker (Tahseen) shows mercy and takes her to her home. She allows her to work until the trainer comes back. She works there and stays with the owner in her home.

On the other side, Shahram learns about Arsala and searches for her. He comes across the welfare association owner, and they have long known each other. He requests her to take care of Arsala and supports the business indirectly for the welfare of Arsala.

Later he meets Arsala, and she requests him to let her talk to Bi Jaan. Shahram plans a vacation to Dubai for a month for Zubiya and her family.

Meanwhile, he plans to bring Bi Jaan and Arsala to his home. Bi Jaan and Arsala stay together for a while. Atif learns that whatever dowry and money he received was from Arsala's earnings. He asks Naeema to give her parents back the money, but she makes a fuss.

On the other hand, Arsala and Shahram are engaged (according to their plan), but Zubiya and her family find out and fight with Bi Jaan about it. Shahram confesses to Arsala about his love. Zubiya's mother lies about Arsala to his father, and he suffers a heart attack. He dies telling his last wish to Arsala to marry Shahram.

Meanwhile, at the funeral, Naeema abuses Arsala about Shahram, and he listens to it. Arsala leaves the house early with Shahram. As she is about to accept his love, he breaks the engagement. Inside the house, she cries, and Shahram listens to it.

On the other hand, Basit leaves Bi Jaan at an old home, and Shahram accepts Zubiya. Atif comes to Karachi only to find out he works for Arsala. After Arsala realizes that Atif is coming for the job, she declines. As he feels bad, Shahram hires Atif without revealing himself. Atif receives a house and a good-paying job because of Shahram.

Shahram and Zubiya are getting engaged, whilst Bi Jaan is sick in the old home, and her son refuses to pick up the phone calls concerning her. Atif and his wife are invited to the engagement party, and so is Arsala, and all of them attend. At the engagement, Atif and Naeema see Arsala, and although Naeema resents it, Atif is pleased to see her.

Shahram takes Zubiya and her mother aside, along with Naeema, Atif and Arsala, where he says he will break off the engagement with Zubiya unless her mother apologizes for mistreating Arsala and clearing up all the lies she had told about what she did in Karachi. After, Arsala forgives them, and Atif approaches Arsala asking her why she was quiet. She says they are not family for her because they left her.

Arsala, while leaving, comes across a man who informs Basit about Bi Jaan's critical condition, and she flees to the hospital. She sees Bi Jaan, and cries because of her state. Arsala calls Shahram, but by the time he arrives, she dies. They take her to Shahram's house. Basit demands the body when Shahram informs them that Bi Jaan's will specified that they should not take her remains to her son's house because of what he did. Shahram breaks off all ties with them, which includes his engagement with Zubiya.

After reading his mother's will, Basit overcomes with guilt. Zubiya is heartbroken as Shahram has broken off their engagement. Shahram and Arsala are mourning the death of Bi Jaan. Atif goes to Naeema and tells her to leave with her mother, who wants to return home. He says that he didn't love Arsala, and Naeema doesn't love him either. They only love themselves, and think they can get what they want.

Nasreen says that Bi Jaan has died but has left them with unhappiness. Basit slaps her and says he should have done this earlier so his mother would have been with him. Arsala's mother apologises to her, and she forgives her. Naeema tells Arsala that she snatched Atif from her, but Arsala says Naeema is responsible for all this. Arsala confronts Atif and asks him not to leave Naeema. Atif believes she should feel what she has done to other's life. He tells her that he is going abroad. Arsala asks him to take her Khala (Atif's mother) with her, upon which he agrees. Guddu taunts Naeema several times. Naeema's conscience makes her realise she is responsible for all this. She has lost everything, and kills herself by jumping from the terrace. Tahseen asks Shahram, who is leaving for Canada later that night, to tell Arsala that he has done so much for her. Tahseen arranges a dinner for them without letting each other know. Arsala stops Shahram from going, and Shahram puts ring in her hand, and both walk with hand in hand.

== Cast ==
- Zara Noor Abbas as Arsala:

A simple and beautiful girl who is in love with Atif. She sacrifices her love due to family circumstances. She does anything to make her family happy. Sabir takes advantage of her working and leaves the factory job. She has a greedy sister, Naeema and a trusting brother, Guddu. She is the daughter of Sabir and Shahnaz. Later, she falls for Shahraam.

- Affan Waheed as Atif:

He is the first cousin of Arsala from her mother, Shahnaz's side. He and Arsala like each other, but circumstances make him hate Arsala, and he marries Naeema instead.

- Iqra Aziz as Naeema:

She is the greedy sister of Arsala and wants to become like Arsala. She is selfish and goes to any length to get what she wants. She loves Atif and is angry about Arsala and Atif's engagement. She tries to separate them but fails every time. She is joyful when her father catches both of them and eventually lets her marry Atif.

- Bilal Khan as Shahraam:

A simple guy who comes from Episode # 9. He is the nephew of Aunt Nasreen and cousin of Zubiya. He is madly in love with Arsala.

- Tauqeer Nasir as Sabir:

He is the miserly father of Naeema, Arsala and Guddu. He works in an ordinary factory but leaves when Arsala starts working. He takes advantage of Arsala's money and lets her fiancé marry Naeema.

- Nida Mumtaz as Shahnaz:

She is the mother of Arsala, Naeema and Guddu and is a supportive mother. She loves Arsala more than her other children, which leads to Naeema's jealousy. She is married to Sabir, the younger sister of Suraiya and aunt of Atif.

- Sajida Syed as Suraiya:

She is the mother of Atif, aunt of Naeema, Arsala and Guddu and elder sister of Shahnaz. She is the supporting mother of Atif and wants Atif and Arsala to marry, but is forced to get Atif and Naeema married.

- Javaid Iqbal as Muddassir:

Sabir's wealthy relative in whose house he sent Arsala to work as a maid

- Ambar Wajid as Haseena:

She is the bitter as well as loving wife of Muddassir. She teases Arsala at first, but she then starts managing with her.

- Fazal Husain as Guddu:

He is the brother of Naeema and Arsala. He supports Arsala because she always helps him with many things. He hates Naeema due to her behaviour with Arsala.

- Rashida Tabadsum as Safya;

Haseena's friend at whose house Haseena sends Arsala for work before moving to Canada

- Saife Hasan as Jamal; Safiya's husband
- Azra Mansoor as Bi Jaan
- Zahra Shah as Zubiya
- Mariam Mirza as Nasreen: Zubiya's mother
- Mohsin Geelani as Basit: Zubiya's father

== Production ==
Zara makes her second appearance on Hum TV after her 2016 romantic drama, Dharkan and return of Iqra Aziz after 3 months on Natak. Apart from acting, Bilal has also sung the OST of the drama.

== Reception ==
=== Viewership ===
The series was among the top ten highly rated television series for March and April 2018.

== Awards and nominations ==
Year	Award	Nominee	Result	Ref
2018	Best Drama Serial Popular	Khamoshi	Nominated	
2018	Best Original Soundtrack Popular	Bilal Khan and Schumaila Hussain	Nominated	
2018	Hum Award for Best Actor in a Negative Role	Iqra Aziz	Nominated	
