= Muhabbat Ab Nahi Hugi =

- Title screen
- Genre: Romance
- Written by: Saima Akram Chaudhry
- Starring: Armeena Khan; Ali Rehman Khan; Syed Jibran; Laila Zuberi; Sundas Khan
- Country of origin: Pakistan
- Original language: Urdu
- No. of episodes: 17

Production
- Producers: Momina Duraid; Gem Stones
- Production locations: Islamabad, ICT
- Camera setup: Multi-camera setup
- Running time: 36–43 minutes

Original release
- Network: Hum TV
- Release: 4 August – 30 September 2014

Mohabbat Ab Nahi Hogi (English: Love will be no longer, Urdu: محبت اب نہیں ہو گی) is a 2014 Pakistani romantic drama serial that aired on Hum TV every Monday and Tuesday at 9:10 pm./PST. It is written by Saima Akram Chaudhry and produced by MD Productions of Gem Stones. It stars Armeena Rana Khan, Ali Rehman Khan, Syed Jibran, Laila Zuberi and Sundas Khan in pivot roles. The show topped the ratings chart with 5.12 TRPs reaching at position no one and followed by Shikwa and Khata with 3.8 and 2.8 TRP's respectively.

== Plot ==
The series revolves around Arham, a diligent man who sacrifices his personal life to work abroad, driven by the desire to provide a better future for his loved ones. However, in his relentless pursuit of financial stability, he neglects the emotional needs of his devoted wife, Fiza. His insatiable hunger for wealth ultimately takes precedence, leading him to abandon his plans to return home, leaving his loyal wife to await his return. The circumstance then take a drastic turn, leading to problems in the couple's marital life.

== Cast ==
- Syed Jibran as Arham
- Ali Rehman Khan as Aazar
- Sundas Khan as Urooj
- Armeena Rana Khan as Fiza
- Zainab Qayyum as Uzma
- Zarnish Khan as Madhia
- Laila Zuberi as Arham's mother
- Nargis Rasheed as Fiza's Mother
- Anjum Habibi
- Sift Chaudhry
- Sofia
- Tariq Abdullah
- Alamdaar Khan

== Soundtrack ==
Muhabbat Ab Nahi Hugi OST is sung by Momin Durani, while lyrics were penned down by Sabir Zafar and music composed by Shebi of MadMusic.

== Production ==
Saima Akram Chaudhry's idea was initially met with no response from production houses for many years. Saira Ghulam Nabi, who knew Chaudhry from her time as editor of Khawateen Digest, joined MD Productions in 2014 and discovered her one-liners. Nabi contacted Chaudhry, taught her script-writing, and helped to develop the idea into a project, Muhabbat Ab Nahi Hogi, marking Chaudhry's debut as a screenwriter. The series was filmed in Islamabad.

== Accolades ==
Drama receives following nomination at 2015 Hum Awards:

Date of ceremony	Award	Category	Recipient(s)	Result
9 April 2015	Hum Awards	Best Actor Popular	Ali Rehman Khan	Nominated
