= Daasi (TV series) =

Pakistani romantic drama television series

- Official title card
- داسی
- Genre: Drama; Romance; Thriller
- Written by: Misbah Nausheen
- Directed by: Mohsin Talat
- Starring: Mawra Hocane; Adeel Hussain; Faryal Mehmood
- Country of origin: Pakistan
- Original language: Urdu
- No. of seasons: 1
- No. of episodes: 30

Production
- Producer: Momina Duraid
- Production location: Pakistan
- Camera setup: Multi-camera setup
- Running time: approx. 35-40 minutes
- Production companies: MD Productions; Moomal Entertainment

Original release
- Network: Hum TV
- Release: 16 September 2019 – 13 April 2020

Related
- Inkaar; Tum Ho Wajah

Daasi (lit. ''female servant'') is a 2019 Pakistani romantic drama television series co-produced by Momina Duraid and Moomal Shunaid under their production banners MD Productions and Moomal Entertainment. It features Mawra Hocane, Adeel Hussain and Faryal Mehmood. It was aired on Hum TV from 16 September 2019 to 13 April 2020.

== Cast ==
- Adeel Hussain as Ahil
- Mawra Hocane as Sunehri
- Faryal Mehmood as Alia
- Kamran Jilani as Shahabuddin
- Hina Khawaja Bayat as Ahil's mother
- Furqan Qureshi as Adil
- Adnan Jaffar as Touqeer
- Naeema Butt as Irma
- Mohsin Ejaz as Mujtaba
- Fazila Kaiser as Sunehri's mother

== Soundtrack ==
The soundtrack is composed by Waqas Azeem on lyrics of Ali Moeen. It is sung by Wajji Ali.
