= Khwabon Mein Mili =

2025 Pakistani television series

- Genre: Drama
- Written by: Kifayat Rodani
- Directed by: Ali Masud Saeed
- Starring: Aashir Wajahat; Adnan Raza Mir; Aena Khan; Ameema Saleem
- Country of origin: Pakistan
- Original language: Urdu
- No. of episodes: 28

Production
- Producer: Momina Duraid
- Production company: MD Productions

Original release
- Network: Hum TV
- Release: November 9, 2025 – February 15, 2026

Khwabon Mein Mili is a Pakistani television series produced by Momina Duraid under MD Productions, the series stars Aashir Wajahat, Adnan Raza Mir, Aena Khan and Ameema Saleem in leading roles. It premiered on Hum TV on 9 November 2025.

== Plot ==
The series follows individuals whose lives become intertwined through romantic relationships, personal ambitions and social circumstances. Their relationships face difficulties arising from misunderstandings and differences in their backgrounds, leading them to reconsider their expectations and choices.

== Cast ==
- Aashir Wajahat
- Adnan Raza Mir
- Aena Khan
- Ameema Saleem Khan
- Amna Malik
- Adnan Jaffar
- Faisal Rehman
- Naveen Naqvi
- Faiza Gillani
