= Master of Science in Marketing =

The Master of Science in Marketing (or MS Marketing) is a graduate that prepares the student to work in middle-management-and-above marketing positions. The specific field within marketing will depend on the student, their program, and the firm with which they will work. Fields may include brand management, digital marketing, integrated marketing communication, marketing analytics and research, marketing strategy, pricing strategy and many others.

The key difference between the MS Marketing degree and the Master of Business Administration (MBA) degree is the required number of marketing courses in the degree. Typically the MBA degree may have a concentration in marketing or other fields of 4–6 courses. The MS Marketing degree will usually have 10–12 marketing courses. The MBA will offer courses in accounting, finance, business strategy, marketing, organizational behavior and other general business courses in much less depth than a specialized degree such as the MS Marketing degree that requires marketing courses, supplemented with perhaps a few electives in other areas such as analytics.

== See also ==
- Master of Business Administration
- Master of Science in Management
- Master of Marketing Research
- Master of Project Management
