= VCU Brandcenter =

Brandcenter at VCU
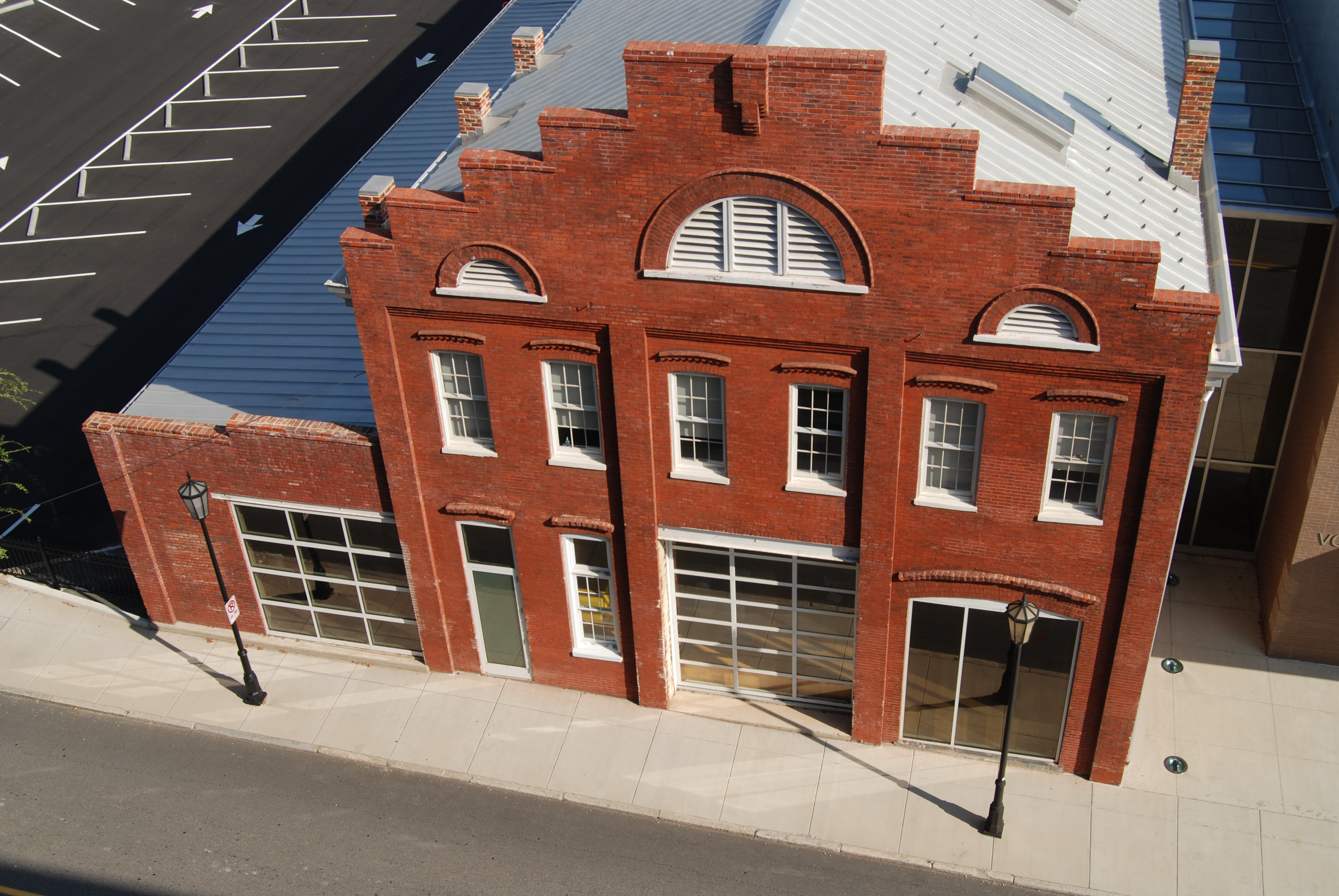
- Former name: VCU Adcenter
- Type: Master's degree program
- Established: 1996
- Parent institution: Virginia Commonwealth University
- Students: 200
- Location: Richmond, Virginia, U.S.
- Campus: Urban
- Website: www.brandcenter.vcu.edu

The Brandcenter at VCU (often called Brandcenter, formerly known as VCU Adcenter) is a master's program for advertising, branding and creative problem-solving at Virginia Commonwealth University. The school is part of the VCU School of Business.

== Program and concentrations ==
Brandcenter students earn a Master of Science in business, with a focus in the following concentrations:

- Art Direction
- Copywriting
- Creative Brand Management
- Strategy

The program is highly collaborative project-based, designed to simulate a real-world agency/client setting. Students study within their given concentration, while also collaborating with all concentrations on team projects that culminate in presentations to their faculty, peers, and real-world clients.

== History ==
The Brandcenter opened as the VCU Adcenter in 1996 under the leadership of founder Diane Cook-Tench, a former senior vice president and creative director at The Martin Agency. Cook-Tench worked with then-president of VCU, Dr. Eugene Trani, to create the school. She helped create a board of directors that included Jay Chiat, founder of TBWA\Chiat\Day, and Dan Wieden, president of Wieden + Kennedy, from her contacts in the industry. The school began with 51 students in three concentrations: art direction, copywriting and strategy.

From 2000 to 2002, Patricia Alvey, who holds a Ph.D. in advertising from the University of Texas at Austin, served as director.

In 2003, Rick Boyko, former co-president and chief creative officer of Ogilvy & Mather Worldwide, was named director of the Brandcenter and led the school for eight years.

In 2005, the program was ranked the top graduate advertising program by Advertising Age’s Creativity Magazine. After introducing the new Creative Brand Management track in 2007, it was named one of the world's 60 best Design Schools by BusinessWeek magazine.

In 2008, the school changed its name from VCU Adcenter to VCU Brandcenter "to better reflect [the] evolving industry," and moved into a newly renovated building designed by Clive Wilkinson to "promote creativity and collaboration." Later that year, the Brandcenter introduced its Creative Technology concentration "to emphasize the increasingly central role that digital media plays in advertising." It was named by AdAge as one of "The Country's Top Five Digital Media and Marketing Schools."

In 2010, the Brandcenter building was named Mike Hughes Hall after the president and co-chief creative officer of The Martin Agency. Mr. Hughes was one of the school's founding board members.

In 2012, Rick Boyko retired and Helayne Spivak, former Chief Creative Officer of Y&R and JWT, became the new director of the Brandcenter. The Brandcenter also moved from the College of Humanities and Sciences at VCU to become part of the VCU School of Business, and the degree changed from a Master of Science in mass communications to a Master of Science in business.

In 2015, the Creative Technology concentration evolved into Experience Design to focus on "the industry’s shift from brand communications to brand experiences."

In August 2018, Vann Graves became the director of the Brandcenter. Prior to joining the Brandcenter, Vann had been a global executive creative director at McCann and a chief creative officer at JWT. Under Graves's leadership, the Brandcenter formed a new advisory board, the Director's Council.

In 2020, the Brandcenter saw a total of 26 alumni contribute to 18 different Super Bowl commercials — a record number for the program. Brands represented by alumni work (some as recent as the Class of 2019) included Planters, Olay, Doritos, Bud Light, Facebook and Porsche.

Due to the COVID-19 outbreak in 2020, Brandcenter partnered with Working Not Working to host the annual Recruiter Session virtually. In June, a team of 50+ Brandcenter students and recent graduates started a student-run creative co-op, The Carriage House.

== Campus and facilities ==
The Brandcenter building, Mike Hughes Hall, was designed by South African architect Clive Wilkinson. It was originally the carriage house for the Jefferson Hotel. The school moved into this building from its original location in Richmond's Shockoe Slip in 2008.

== Recruiter session ==
The Brandcenter holds an annual Recruiter Session (often referred to as a "reverse career fair") every April. Recruiters from the nation's top agencies and companies come to the Brandcenter to meet and recruit the graduating class.

Due to the COVID-19 outbreak in 2020, Brandcenter partnered with Working Not Working to host the annual Recruiter Session virtually.

== Sixty magazine ==
Sixty is the Brandcenter's annual magazine. The title derives from the sixty weeks that students spend earning their master's degrees. It contains student work, information about the program and its five concentrations, and features on alumni, industry leaders and student life.

== Director's Council ==
The Brandcenter Director's Council, founded in 2019, is composed of brand leaders from some of today's businesses. The founding council members represent a wide range of professional diversity and expertise, innovating how the Brandcenter prepares its students to lead in the workforce. They are the Brandcenter's link to the business world.
