= Farhat Ishtiaq =

Pakistani writer, author and screenwriter

- Born: Karachi, Sindh
- Occupations: Author, novelist, screenwriter
- Writing career
- Language: Urdu
- Notable works: Humsafar, Mata-e-Jaan Hai Tu, Diyar-e-Dil, Rehaai, Udaari, Yaqeen Ka Safar, Kabhi Main Kabhi Tum

Farhat Ishtiaq (Sindhi: فرحت اشتياق) is a Pakistani author and screenwriter. She is best known for her romantic novels Humsafar, Mata-e-Jaan Hai Tu, Diyar-e-Dil, Dil se Nikle Hain Jo Lafz and Woh Jo Qarz Rakhty Thay Jaan Per. Her work mostly focuses on Pakistani society.

== Early life ==
She was born into a Sindhi family in Karachi, Sindh. She spent some of her childhood in Tokyo, Japan where her father worked for the Pakistan International Airlines (PIA). Ishtiaq has a master's degree in civil engineering. She made a choice to give up engineering in 2005 and devote herself to writing.

== Publications ==
=== Novels, books and short stories ===
- Humsafar
- Mata-e-Jaan Hai Tu
- Mere Humdum Mere Dost
- Diyar-e-Dil
- Bin Roye Ansoo
- Jo Bachay Hain Sang Samait Lo

=== Translations ===
Ishtiaq published the Hindi edition of her famous novel Woh Yakeen Ka Naya Safar on Amazon. She has also published a Roman Urdu edition of her short story Rait say But na Bana.

== Filmography (as a screenwriter) ==
=== Television ===
| Year | Title | Network | Remarks / References |
|---|---|---|---|
| 2011-12 | Humsafar | Hum TV | |
| 2012 | Mata-e-Jaan Hai Tu | Hum TV | |
| 2013 | Rehaai | Hum TV | |
| 2014 | Mere Humdum Mere Dost | Urdu1 | |
| 2015 | Dayar-e-Dil | Hum TV | |
| 2016 | Udaari | Hum TV | |
| 2016-17 | Bin Roye | Hum TV | |
| 2017 | Yaqeen Ka Safar | Hum TV | |
| 2019 | Yeh Dil Mera | Hum TV | |
| 2024 | Kabhi Main Kabhi Tum | ARY Digital | |
| 2024-25 | Meem Se Mohabbat | Hum TV | |
| 2025 | Meri Tanhai | Hum TV | Script supervision |
| 2025 | Woh Ek Raat | Hum TV | Telefilm |
| 2026 | Zanjeerain | Hum TV | |
| 2026 | Jo Bachay Hain Sang Samait Lo | Netflix | |
| TBA | Tan Man Aur Tum | Green Entertainment | Script supervision |

=== Films ===
| Year | Title | Network |
|---|---|---|
| 2015 | Bin Roye | Hum Films |
| 2018 | Parwaaz Hay Junoon | Hum Films |

== Awards and achievements ==
- Hum Honorary Phenomenal Serial Award Best Writer Award for Phenomenal Serial Humsafar (1st Hum Awards 2013)
- Best Writer Diyar e Dil (4th Hum Awards 2016)
- Best Writer for Udaari (5th Hum Awards 2017)

=== Lux Style Awards ===
| Ceremony | Category | Project | Result |
|---|---|---|---|
| 13th Lux Style Awards | Best Television Writer | Rehaai | Nominated |
| 16th Lux Style Awards | Best Television Writer | Diyar-e-Dil | Nominated |
| 16th Lux Style Awards | Best Television Writer | Udaari | Won |
| 20th Lux Style Awards | Best Television Writer | Yeh Dil Mera | Nominated |

Controversially she was never nominated for her most successful drama to date Humsafar.
