= Mata-e-Jaan Hai Tu (novel) =

Romantic novel

Mata-e-Jaan Hai Tu (Urdu: متاعِ جاں ہے تُو) is a social romantic novel by Pakistani author Farhat Ishtiaq. It is an Urdu language novel about the love story of a young couple.

== Plot ==
A young Pakistani boy and girl studying at Columbia University, USA fall in love with each other. They marry against the wishes of the boy's father, who cuts them off from his family. A sudden twist of fate brings the girl face-to-face with the boy's parents, and she tries her best to win their hearts. Through her wisdom and perseverance, she wins them over.

== Background ==
The premise of the novel was based on an idea given to Ishtiaq by her sister, who suggested that she write about a girl who comes to live with her in-laws after her husband’s death.

== Adaptation ==
The novel was adapted into a television series by the same name which aired on Hum TV in 2011.
