= Tanvir =

Tanvir (also spelled Tanbir, Tanveer, Tanweer, Tanver or Tanwir; Arabic: تنوير, romanised: Tanwīr; Pashto/Persian/Urdu: تنویر, romanised: Tanvīr; Bengali: তানভীর, romanised: Tānbhīr) is a unisex given name and surname, derived from Arabic تنوير meaning "enlightenment", also derived from Hindi and Punjabi languages in India meaning "strong in body, brave from body".

== Notable people with this given name ==
- Tanveer Ilyas Khan, Sardar Muhammad Tanveer Ilyas Khan - Azad Jammu & Kashmir Prime Minister (AJK - Pakistani politician)
- Tanveer Ghani, British actor
- Tanveer Abbasi (1934–1999), Pakistani poet
- Chowdhury Tanbir Ahmed Siddiky (born 1939), Bangladeshi politician and former state minister
- Tanvir Gill, Indian Gujrati News Anchor
- Tanvir Mokammel (born 1955), Bangladeshi film director
- Tanveer Imam (born 1960), Bangladeshi politician
- Tanweer Hasan, Bangladeshi vice-chancellor
- Tanvir Ahmed (born 1972), Bangladeshi cricket umpire
- Tanveer Aslam Malik (born 1972), Pakistani politician
- Tanveer Ahmed (born 1975), Bangladeshi-Australian psychiatrist and journalist
- Tanvir Shakil Joy (born 1976), Bangladeshi politician
- Tanvir Hasan Soto Monir (born 1978), Bangladeshi politician
- Tanvir Ahmed (born 1978), Pakistani cricketer
- Tanwir Afzal (born 1988), Hong Kong-Pakistani cricketer
- Tanbir Hayder Khan (born 1991), Bangladeshi cricketer
- Tanvir Islam (born 1996), Bangladeshi cricketer
- Tanveer Faiz (born 1958), former vice admiral of the Pakistan Navy
- Tanveer Ahmed (boxer) (born 1968), Pakistani boxer
- Tanveer Ahmed (footballer) (born 1976), Pakistani footballer
- Tanvir Tareq, Bangladeshi music composer, director, singer, and television anchor
- Tanvir Mahmood Ahmed (born 1952), Pakistan Air Force officer
- Rana Tanveer Hussain (born 1949), former Minister in Pakistan
- Tanvir Hussain, English terrorist convicted for the 2006 transatlantic aircraft plot
- Tanveer Ashraf Kaira (born 1960), Politician
- Tanvir Ahmad Khan (1932–2013), Pakistan Air Force officer
- Tanvir Mehdi (born 1972), Pakistani cricketer
- Tanveer Naqvi, Pakistani general
- Tanvir Sadiq, Indian politician
- Tanveer Shahnawaz, Canadian politician
- Tanveer Zaidi (born 1975), Indian film actor and educationist

== Notable people with this surname ==
- Habib Tanvir (1923–2009), Indian theatre director
- Nial Tanvir (born 1965), British astronomer
- Shehzad Tanweer (1982–2005), English Islamic terrorist and perpetrator of the 7/7 attacks
- Sohail Tanvir (born 1984), Pakistani cricketer

== See also ==
- Tanwir al-Miqbas, Islamic study book
