= Mission Possible =

- Abbreviation: MP
- Type: Charitable organization
- Location: Vancouver, British Columbia
- Key people: Matthew Smedley (Executive Director)
- Website: mission-possible.ca

Mission Possible is a community economic development agency founded in 1992 and operating in Vancouver Downtown Eastside district. Mission Possible supports individuals who are challenged with poverty to navigate their journey to a sustainable livelihood. Mission Possible runs two social enterprises, MP Maintenance and MP Neighbors, offering empowerment through opportunity. This is done through employment training and individual coaching in the Employment Readiness Program, and by offering transitional work opportunities in social enterprises.

== Services and Social Enterprises ==
Mission Possible is organized into these departments:

- Employment Readiness Program (ERP) - Supports individuals experiencing barriers to employment. Offers skills training, work experience, and employment support, such as creating a resume and getting references. The ERP functions as a stepping stone for transitioning into a more permanent employment opportunity.
- MP Maintenance - Provides training and direct short-term employment in property maintenance tasks such as window washing, graffiti removal, painting, and general grounds clean-up. It is a full-service exterior property cleaning company committed to employing individuals with barriers to employment.
- MP Neighbors - A community-based solution to community safety and security. Crews complete regular neighborhood routes in the Downtown Eastside, providing outreach and referral services to people on the streets, checking in with businesses, and building connections between these diverse groups. Additionally, the Neighbors program does needle pick-up, a service that helps Vancouver become cleaner and safer.
