= Karb =

2015 Pakistani television production

- Genre: Drama; Romance
- Written by: Rahat Jabeen
- Directed by: Amna Nawaz Khan
- Starring: Adnan Siddiqui; Armeena Khan; Saman Ansari; Farrukh Aftab "For entire cast see the section of cast below"
- Theme music composer: Mad Music
- Opening theme: "Karb" OST by Rahat Fateh Ali Khan
- Composer: Sahir Ali Bagga
- Country of origin: Pakistan
- Original language: Urdu

Production
- Producer: Amna Nawaz Khan
- Production location: Karachi
- Cinematography: Sajid Kashmiri
- Editor: Imtiaz Ali
- Camera setup: Multi-camera setup
- Running time: (Approx. 36–40 minutes of airing)
- Production company: Amna Nawaz Khan Productions

Original release
- Network: Hum TV
- Release: 4 May – 12 October 2015

Related
- Maan

Karb (Urdu: کرب transl. Anguish) is a 2015 Pakistani romantic drama serial that aired on Hum TV. It is directed and produced by Amna Nawaz Khan and written by Rahat Jabeen. It stars Adnan Siddiqui, Armeena Khan and Saman Ansari.

== Cast ==
- Adnan Siddiqui as Hamza
- Armeena Khan as Haniya(Hamza's wife)
- Saman Ansari as Aaliya(Hamza's wife)
- Saba Faisal as Sabiha (Haniya's mother)
- Behroze Sabzwari as Fahad
- Mariyam Khalif as Eman (small)
- Hina Altaf as Eman
- Madiha Zaidi as Noor-ul-Ain
- Farrukh Aftab as Umar
- Fouzia Mushtaq as Hamza's mother
- Muhammad Ikram as Haniya's brother
- Nida Mumtaz as Mahnoor
- Ikram Abbasi As faisal

== Plot ==
The story revolves around Hania (Armeena Rana Khan), an innocent unmarried girl who is full of life. She is a typical young girl who has been spoiled by her parents, mostly her mom (Saba Faisal). She gets anything she asks for and loves to shop! Despite being wealthy, she and her family shift to a house on rent. Hania, due to her bubbly nature, quickly becomes friends with a girl Aina (Madiha Zaidi) who's her neighbor. She visits Aina's house very often and when she comes across her brother Hamza (Adnan Siddiqui) she starts having feelings for him. Hania starts to become very serious about Hamza but he doesn't seem to even take notice of her. Hamza is serious, practical, and mature, while Hania is the exact opposite. Hania tells her mom how much she's in love with Hamza and wants to marry him.

Hania's mother takes the word materialism to a whole new level! Since Hamza and his family are not financially as sound, she keeps forcing her to not make the "mistake" of marrying him. "Aap ke sar pe tou ishq ka bhoot sawaar hai. Aap bohat barri ghalati kar rahi hain Haniaa!!" says her mom. Hania doesn't change her mind and marries him.

Hania has been treated like a princess all her life and she expects the same treatment from Hamza and his family too. But Hamza has a lot of responsibilities of his family already and doesn't have the resources to treat Hania that way, but promises to keep her happy despite that too. But little does he know, just happiness is not what Hania's mom wants for her. Hania at this point argues with her mom that she's happy with Hamza, but her mom keeps forcing her that he hasn't given her enough "gold jewelry" or money so she can't be happy.

To cut a very long story short, Hania's mom was never in favor of Hamza becoming her son in law so she goes to every extent to ruin Hania's happiness. Hania also starts doubting Hamza's cousin Aaliya as she finds out that she used to like him a long time ago yet she had no intentions of creating problems for the two. Hania's mom however fills her brain with so many false accusations about Hamza and Aaliya that she eventually starts hating them. Her mom becomes so successful in her plan that she causes the two to get divorced.

Hania was expecting at the time of their divorce so she threatens Hamza to kill the child but it was only a threat. After the divorce Hania and her family shift to another house to help Hania start a new life. She gets blessed with a baby girl whom she hides from Hamza, but later he finds out about it and files a case to take her custody, but fails. Hania's mom had always wanted Hania to marry Faisal who happens to be her bhabi's cousin. Of course, Faisal is rich. Hania starts working and ignores Emaan (her daughter). When Hamza finds out he tells Hania to either give proper time and care to Emaan or to hand her over to him forever and then go marry Faisal. Hania has yet to decide what option she's going to pick!

== Soundtrack ==
The title song is written by Sabir Zafar, with composition by Sahir Ali Bagga.

=== Track listing ===
No.	Title	Artist(s)	Length
1.	"Karb"	Rahat Fateh Ali Khan	3.42

== See also ==
- List of Pakistani television serials
