= Bin Roye Ansoo (novel) =

2010 novella by Farhat Ishtiaq

- Author: Farhat Ishtiaq
- Language: Urdu
- Subject: Fiction
- Genre: Drama, Romance
- Publisher: Ilm-o-Irfan Publishers
- Publication date: July 2010
- Publication place: Pakistan
- Media type: Print (Hardcover, Paperback)
- Pages: 187

Bin Roye Ansoo (Urdu: بن روے آنسو ; lit: Tears, Without Crying) is a novella by Pakistani fiction writer Farhat Ishtiaq, published in 2010. Bin Roye Ansoo was first published in Khawateen Digest, an Urdu-language monthly magazine, as a story in its complete novel section. In 2010, story was published as a novel by Ilm-o-Irfan Publishers.

== Plot summary ==
The story revolves around Saba Shafiq, who is in love with her cousin Irtaza. But he treats her like his best friend, not a love interest. Irtaza then leaves for the United States of America for two years, where he meets Saman Shafiq, who is his cousin and falls in love with her. Saman is Saba's elder sister, and was given to her uncle and aunt as a child. Saman's adoptive parents die when a plane headed for Germany crashes, and Irtaza brings her back to Pakistan. Upon learning she has an elder sister, Saba is at first overjoyed, but her happiness quickly turns to disdain when she finds out that Irtaza and Saman are engaged. In a moment of shock and despair after witnessing their marriage and realizing Irtaza is now Saman's, Saba wishes that Saman had died along with her adoptive parents in the plane crash.

Saman and Irtaza decided to live in America after their marriage. A few years later, Irtaza and Saman come to Karachi with their son Maaz. On Maaz's birthday, Saman plans to get a birthday cake and some flowers for her mother. However, tragedy occurs as Saman is hit by a bus in front of Saba. Irtaza calls and takes her to the hospital immediately, however, Saman dies en route. Meanwhile, as Maaz is a child in need of a mother's love, Irtaza is being suggested to marry Saba, but he declines. Saba marries Safeer. Saba is being told by Safeer that he plans to marry a Canadian. Saba asks Safeer to do what he wants but not to divorce her at any cost. Soon, Irtaza learns that Safeer has married in Canada and has a son and the fact that Saba knew all this but kept it secret angers him, so he confronts Saba upon his return, who cries and tells him that she doesn't want to get divorced. However, Irtaza drags her to their family and tells them the truth. Their family is shocked and they make Safeer divorce Saba. Saba's dying mother wishes Saba and Irtaza to get married. They get married on her mother's deathbed. Saba has difficulty accepting her marriage and moving past her trauma, feeling that she might be the cause of Saman's death. After a dramatic turn of events, Irtaza finally learns the whole story and, recognizing the purity of Saba's love for him, he declares his love for her.

== Adaptations ==
=== Film ===
Bin Roye was developed by Hum TV's senior producer Momina Duraid under her company MD Productions. Cinematographer Shahzad Kashmiri came on board as a co-director with Duraid. Made on a budget of Rs. 3.5 crore (US$130,000), it opened on 400 screens worldwide on Eid-ul-Fitr (July 18) 2015 under the banner of Hum Films in Pakistan and under B4U Films in international markets excluding Pakistan and the Middle-East. Both a domestic and international box office success, it earned Rs30.75 crore ($3.0 million) worldwide and went on to become the third highest-grossing film of Pakistan behind Waar and Jawani Phir Nahi Ani.

=== Television ===
Before the film adaptation was released, a television series was planned by Hum TV in 2015 in collaboration with the channel's own production house MD Productions. The series was scheduled to air as Bin Roye on October 2, 2016 with the same cast and crew.
