= Diyar-e-Dil =

Pakistani television drama series (2015)

- Title screen
- دیارِدل
- Genre: Family drama Serial drama Romance
- Created by: Momina Duraid
- Based on: Dayar-e-Dil by Farhat Ishtiaq
- Written by: Farhat Ishtiaq
- Directed by: Haseeb Hassan
- Starring: Abid Ali; Osman Khalid Butt; Maya Ali; Sanam Saeed; Mikaal Zulfiqar; Hareem Farooq; Ali Rehman Khan
- Theme music composer: Shani Arshad; Bilal Allah Dita
- Opening theme: "Yar-e-Man" by Zebunnisa Bangash
- Ending theme: "Goyanke Ishq" by Momin Durani
- Composer: Shani Arshad
- Country of origin: Pakistan
- Original language: Urdu
- No. of episodes: 33 (list of episodes)

Production
- Producer: Momina Duraid
- Production locations: Skardu, Gilgit–Baltistan, Karachi, Sindh
- Cinematography: Zeb Rao
- Editors: Mehmood Ali; Areeb
- Camera setup: Multi-Camera
- Running time: 30–45 minutes
- Production company: MD Productions

Original release
- Network: Hum TV
- Release: 17 March – 27 October 2015

Diyar-e-Dil (Urdu: دیارِدل; lit. 'The Dominion of the Heart') (also known as Dayar-e-Dil) is a Pakistani television drama serial, that originally aired on Hum TV from 17 March 2015 to 27 October 2015, in 33 episodes.Diyar-e-Dil follows the lives of a dysfunctional family led by Agha Jaan and his grandchildren, Wali and Faarah. The story is told in a heavily serialized manner. It revolves around the lives of Wali and Faarah, who were forced to commit to each other for the cause of reuniting their family, which had fallen apart long ago because of Agha Jaan's eldest son Behroze, when he called off his long engagement to marry his late love interest.

Diyar-e-Dil features an ensemble cast with Abid Ali as Bakhtiyar Ahmed Khan, Osman Khalid Butt and Maya Ali as his grandchildren Wali Suhaib Khan and Faarah Wali Khan, Meekal Zulfiqar, Ali Rehman Khan as his children Behroze Bakhtiyar Khan and Suhaib Bakthiyar Khan and Sanam Saeed, Hareem Farooq as his daughters-in-law Ruhina Behroze Khan and Arjumand Suhaib Khan. It also stars Behroze Sabzwari, Tara Mahmood, Ahmad Zeb and Mariyam Nafees in recurring roles. It was created by Momina Duraid, and aired on Hum TV as part of night programming under Duraid's production company. It was written by Farhat Ishtiaq based on her novel of the same name and directed by Haseeb Hassan. The show is set in Skardu, Gilgit–Baltistan and Karachi, Sindh. Diyar-e-Dil premiered in Pakistan, the UK, USA and UAE on 17 March 2015, with prime slot on Tuesdays.

Diyar-e-Dil was 2015's highest rated and most acclaimed program of Pakistan. It received critical appraisal for being visually-appealing for the male audience, due to the maintenance of their relationships in the story, and was praised for its direction, cinematography and visuals. It was the most awarded show at 4th Hum Awards, and won awards for Best Drama Serial - Jury and Best Drama Serial - Popular. At 15th Lux Style Awards, it won two awards including Best TV Play out of six nominations.

== Premise ==
Diyar-e-Dil depicted the story of Bakhtiyar Khan / Agha Jan (Abid Ali) and his family. Agha Jan's family parted ways a long time ago due to the rebelliousness of his son, Behroze Bakhtiyar Khan (Mekal Zulfiqar) as he refused to marry a woman of his father's choice Arjumand Bedar Khan (Hareem Farooq) and went on to marry his college love interest Ruhina Arsalan (Sanam Saeed) instead. After getting disowned by his father, Behroze left his city to marry Ruhina, while Arjumand was forced to marry Behroze's younger brother, Suhaib Bakhtiyar Khan (Ali Rehman Khan). Soon after his marriage when Behroze came back to apologise to Agha Jaan, he and his wife were insulted and banished for life. This left the two bitter towards Agha Jaan’s family and they chose to continue their a newly married journey in away from his city. The two couples navigated various problems in their marriage, which for Behroze and Ruhina were financial problems, and for Sohaib and Arjumand were emotional disconnect. The series then focused on the transitioning of their life after marriage and showed how Suhaib and Arjumand grew close and fell in love after the birth of their son Wali Suhaib Khan (Osman Khalid Butt). As Behroze and Ruhina gradually achieve financial stability, their lives begin to improve, and they welcome their daughter, Faarah Behroze Khan (Maya Ali).

After twenty years, Behroze became a successful businessman, while Suhaib and Arjumand raise both their children with Agha Jan. Both the couples were settled and satisfied. Despite the estrangement, Sohaib continues looking after his elder brother in hopes of reuniting the family. After Sohaib’s untimely death, Behroze finally came back home and reconciled with Agha Jaan. Their children were married, fulfilling Suhaib's last wish to reunite the family. Behroze and his family returned back to Lahore with Faarah’s rukhsati (the formal departure to her husband’s home) set to take place four years later, after she completes her graduation. However, Ruhina opposed this decision and, influenced by her brother Tajamul Arsalan’s (Behroze Sabzwari) manipulation, left Behroze, making her return conditional on him choosing between her and his father. As a result, Behroze was left heartbroken and died of grief. With the grief of her father's death, Farah never managed to connect with Agha Jaan and Wali, and if she ever managed to, she was pulled back by her mother. Her mother now pressured Agha Jaan to give them a monthly allowance for (Faarah’s care) that she spent on her brother and his wife. With constant persuasion of her mother, maternal uncle and cousin, Faraah demanded for a divorce from Wali along with her inheritance, which further increased tensions within the family and became the cause of Agha Jaan's developing illness. Faarah told her mother she did not want her inheritance to be used bh her mother, and that it was added to her divorce agreements without her choice, due to which Ruhi left the house in anger, leaving her daughter alone.

After Agha Jaan's second heart attack, Wali, driven by rage, kidnapped Faarah from her house and drove her to his summer resort, locking her in a room so she would not be able to escape. Once Faarah calmed down, Wali made an agreement with her; that if she agreed to live with Agha Jaan for three months, he would give her a divorce so she could marry her cousin Moeez (Ahmad Zeb) whom he thought she loved. Following the agreement Faarah grew attachment to the household. One night broke down in front of Agha Jan when she developed affection towards him, and realised her mistakes and lies told by her uncle Tajamul Arsalan (Behroze Sabzwari) and mother. She eventually developed a soft corner for Wali, befriended his sister and chose to spend the rest of her life with Agha Jan. Tajamul and Moeez's truth was revealed to Ruhi after which she regretted her doings and was locked up by Moeez. He kidnapped Faarah to retain her inheritance to invest in his business, where Wali saved her and gets wounded of gun shot. Moeez ended up in jail, while Ruhi breaks all ties from her brother and reunites with Agha Jaan and her in-laws apologizing for her doings. Faarah admits her love for Wali the day her three-month contract was due, the two reconciled removing all the misconceptions they had in their hearts and complete the valley of heart (Diyar-e-Dil) paved by their fathers a long time ago.

== Cast ==
Main cast of Diyar-e-Dil, from left to right: Wali Suhaib Khan, Suhaib Bakhtiyar Khan, Arjumand Suhaib Khan, Bakhytiyar Khan (middle), Ruhi Behroze Khan, Behroze Bakhtiyar Khan and Faarah Wali Khan

=== Main characters ===
- Abid Ali as Bakhtiyar Ahmed Khan/Agha Jan
- Osman Khalid Butt as Wali Suhaib Khan
- Maya Ali as Faarah Wali Khan
- Sanam Saeed as Ruhina Behroze Khan
- Hareem Farooq as Arjumand Suhaib Khan
- Mikaal Zulfiqar as Behroze Bakhtiyar Khan
- Ali Rehman Khan as Suhaib Bakthiyar Khan

=== Recurring characters ===
- Behroze Sabzwari as Tajamul Arsalan
- Maryam Nafees as Zarminey Suhaib Khan
- Tara Mahmood as Zuhra Tajamul
- Ahmad Zeb as Moeez Tajamul
- Eshita Mehboob as Laila Feroze Khan
- Rasheed Naz as Bedar Khan
- Azra Mansoor as Yasmeen Beddar Khan
- Fariya Hassan as Hafsa

== Background and production ==
=== Concept and development ===
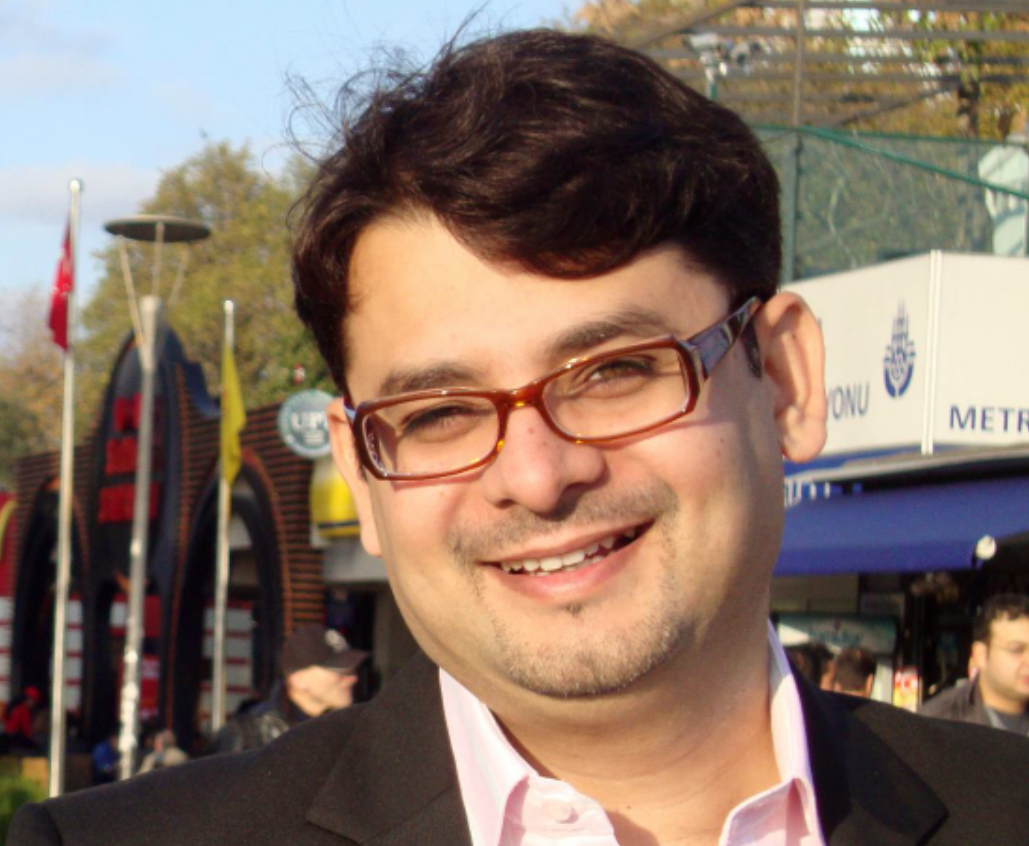
Director of series, Haseeb Hassan

Diyar-e-Dil was developed by Hum TV's senior producer Momina Duraid of MD Productions, the channel hired the award-winning director Haseeb Hassan to direct the series. Story of serial is based on award-winning writer Farhat Ishtiaq's novel of the same name Dayar-e-Dil with few variations. Screenplay is also written by Ishtiaq while script composing is done by Muhammad Wasi-ul-Din. Farhat has previously worked twice with Momina, when she wrote mega-hit drama serial in Pakistan television history Humsafar and Mata-e-Jaan Hai Tu.

Song composition is done by Shany Haider while background music is given by Bilal Allah Ditta, who chose Zeb Bangash and Momin Durrani for singing. The show approximately airs weekly episode for 35–40 minutes (minus commercials) every Tuesday.

Diyar-e-Dill cast and crew in Skardo at Khaplu Palace.

There were several discussions laid on its time slot, previously it was announced that the show will air on Friday's replacing Sadqay Tumhare, and was also reported that the series will originally start its airing in April or May. However, due to promotional reasons the show was given a time slot of Tuesday, 8:00 pm and the pilot episode was released on 17 March 2015, replacing channel's drama series Zid to Sundays.

=== Writing ===
The drama serial screenplay is also written by Ishtiaq. She explained that Momina Duraid gave her a full freedom of writing, while writing she discuss the story-line with Duraid and with mutual ideas and aspects Farhat wrote the scripts and made changes in several drafts of screenplay. Farhat said, "I did everything I wanted to and as I wanted to. I had the havelis [hilly] scenes planned out but was a bit scared ke it might be too much, but Momina made it happen and exactly like I had imagined it." Farhat wrote thirty plus episodes which she explained that "it isn't because it was the demand of the channel or producer, it is because that’s how I wrote it. You will see that it will not drag. But to do justice to the story (which revolves around 3 generations), the characters and their feelings, thirty plus episodes had to be written, otherwise bohut kuch reh jata."

In an interview with Hum TV Farhat states that, "Diyar-e-Dil as a novel was not my best thing. It could have been written better which I tried to do in the script. I personally feel Diyar-e-Dils script is far better than the original novel. I'm planning to rewrite Diyar-e-Dil novel with all the additions that I've made for the script. In my opinion Diyar e-Dil script is my best script till date. Diyar e Dil critics can disagree with me." Commenting on characters, she emphasized that they are based on, "Family ties, relationships and love. It was a journey which my characters took to find out whether love is enough for us or do we need blood relations also? Can a person survive without his/her parents, siblings and family? My characters chose different paths and some of them later regret their decisions. How one generation's mistakes bring troubles to the next generation was also a big problem which my characters faced."

==== Novella ====
The entire story of the series is based on Ishtiaq's novella. While developing screenplay Farhat made several changes, in an interview she said, "There are some differences, but they are very positive. I wrote several drafts of this novel back in 2006. While adapting I took some scenes and situations from my earlier drafts of the novel. Interestingly Momina and I think on the same wavelength. She came up to me once and said Farhat, it would be great if the story had this and this and I said, that is what I had written in the earlier drafts and we just used those. In the novel, there were flashbacks here the story is very linear. Now we have a very strong linear story and I have strengthened the characters even more. I have really enjoyed this script and it was very difficult for me. There are so many characters and each with their feelings that I had to do justice to the feelings of all the characters. I Enjoyed the difficulty as I had also challenged myself." Few characters were added, who only introduced namely in novel. Characters like, Laila, Ibrahim Feroze and parents of Arjumand, Yasmin and Bedar were expanded. Arjumand’s character itself had a less appearance in book while in serial it is one of leading character. Ruhina's miscarriage was also not written in the novel.

=== Casting ===
Main cast of Diyar-e-Dil
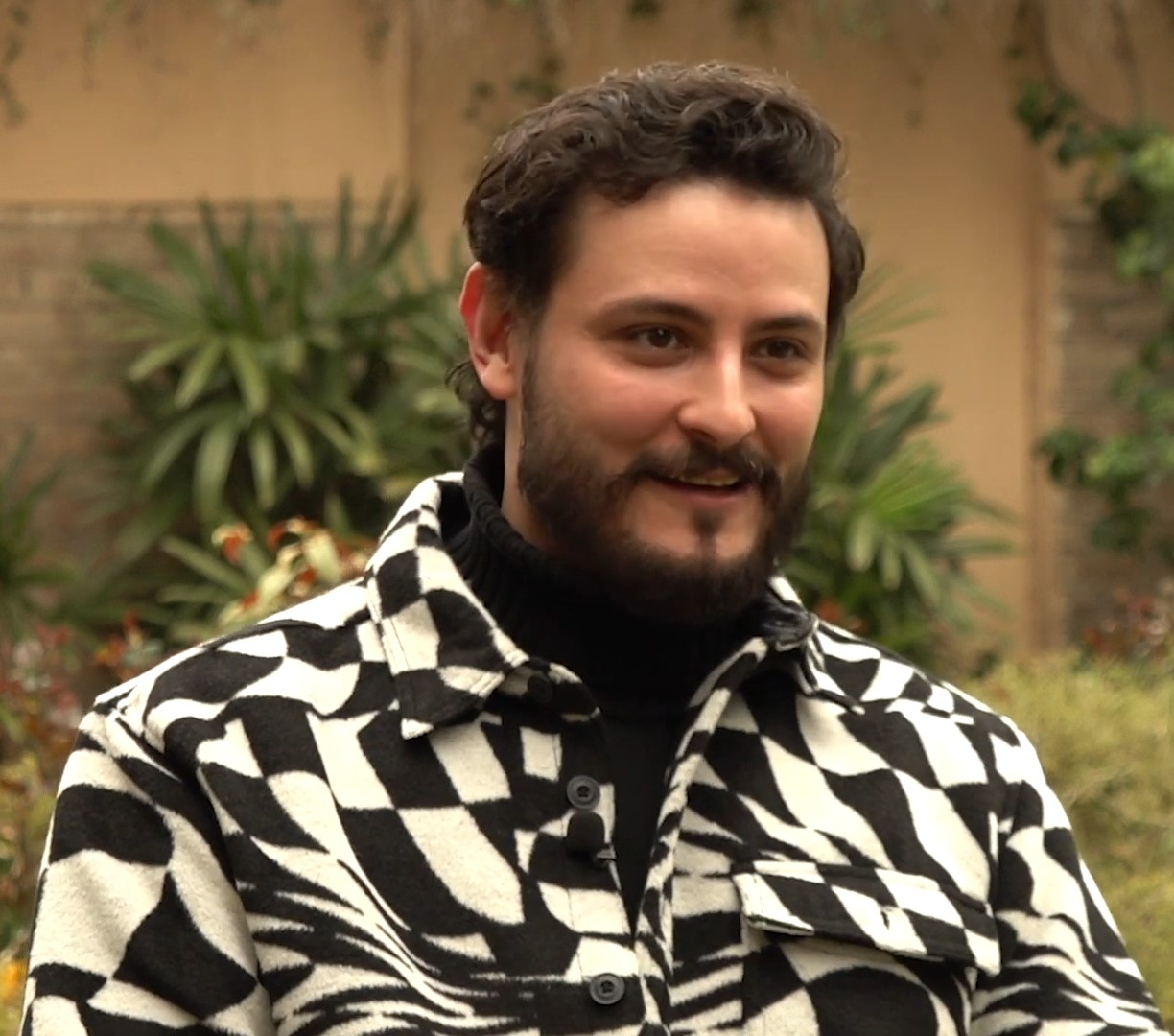
Osman Khalid Butt

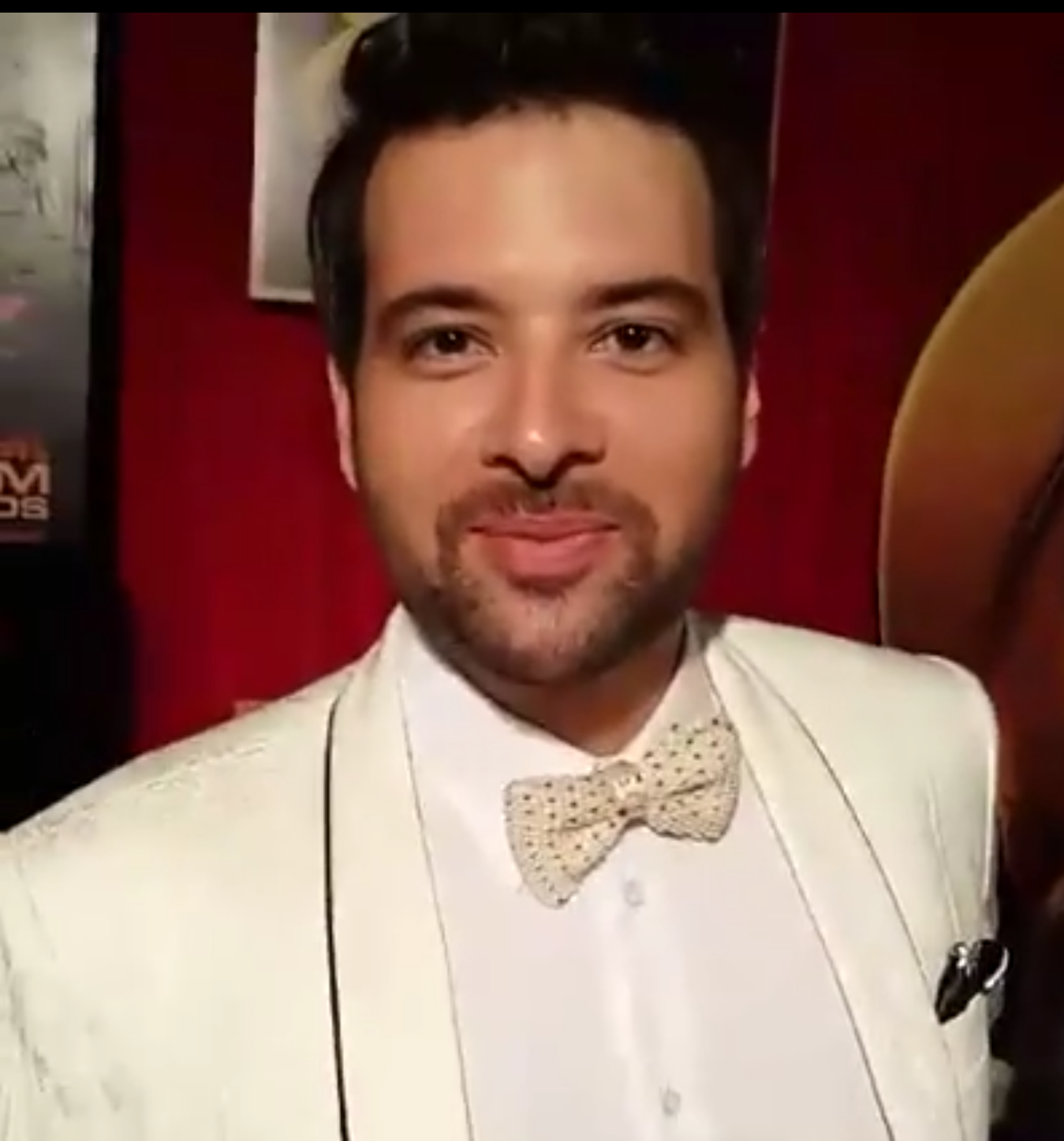
Mikaal Zulfiqar

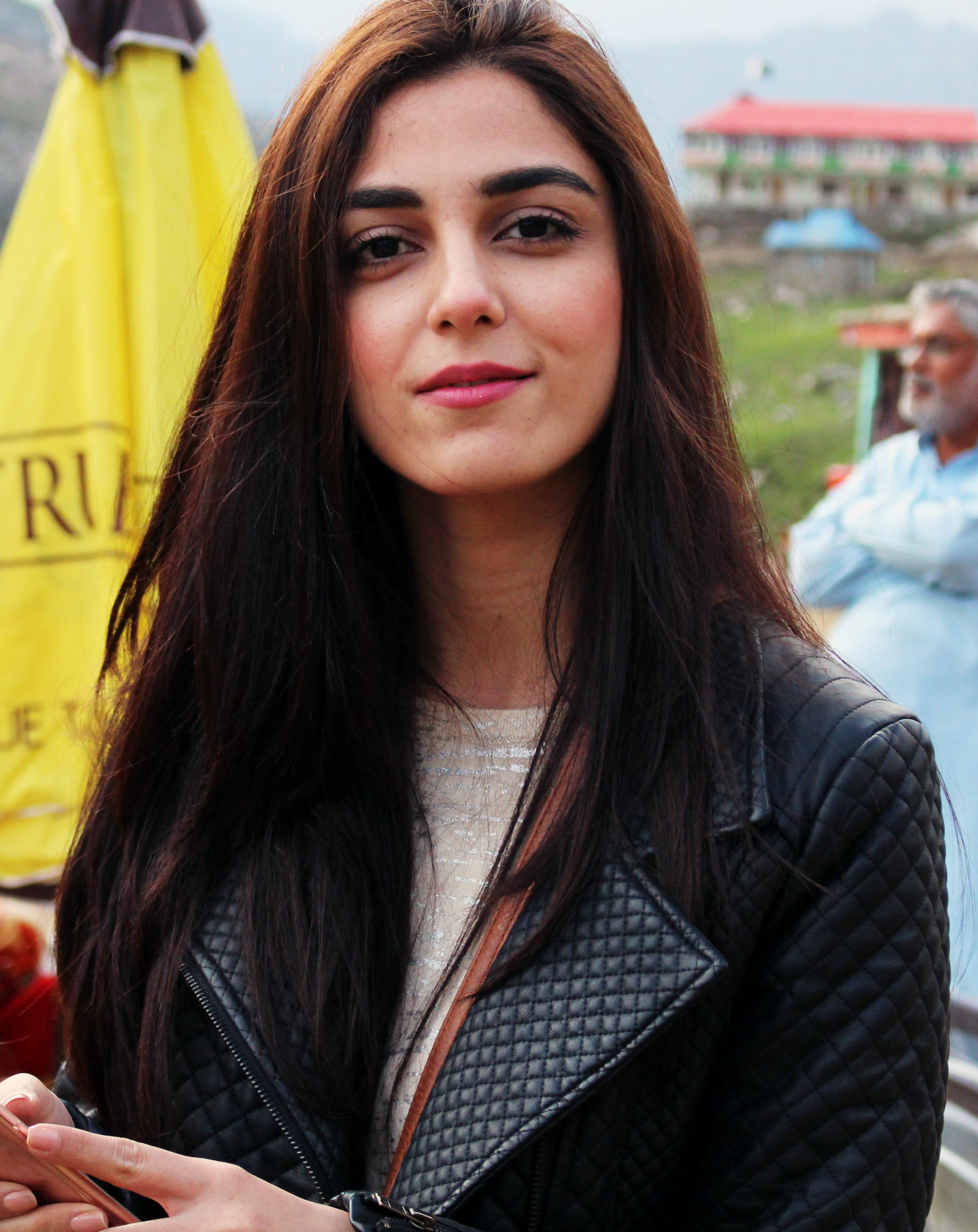
Maya Ali

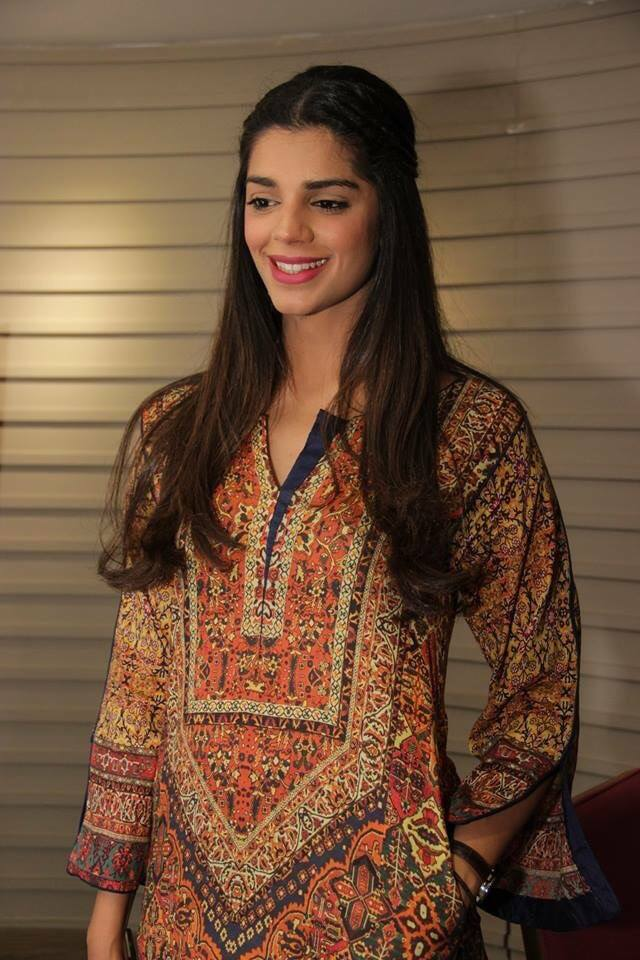
Sanam Saeed

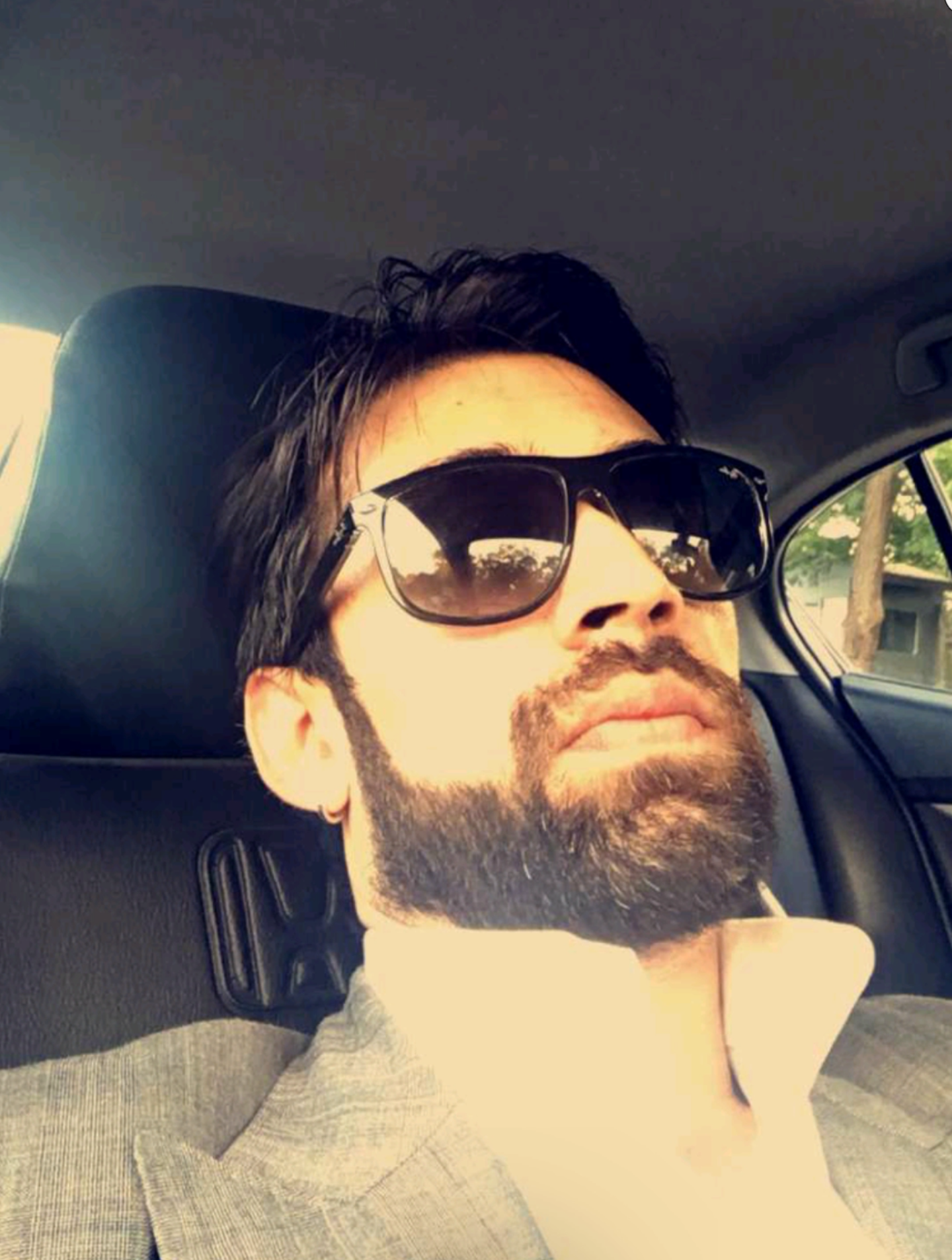
Ali Rehman Khan

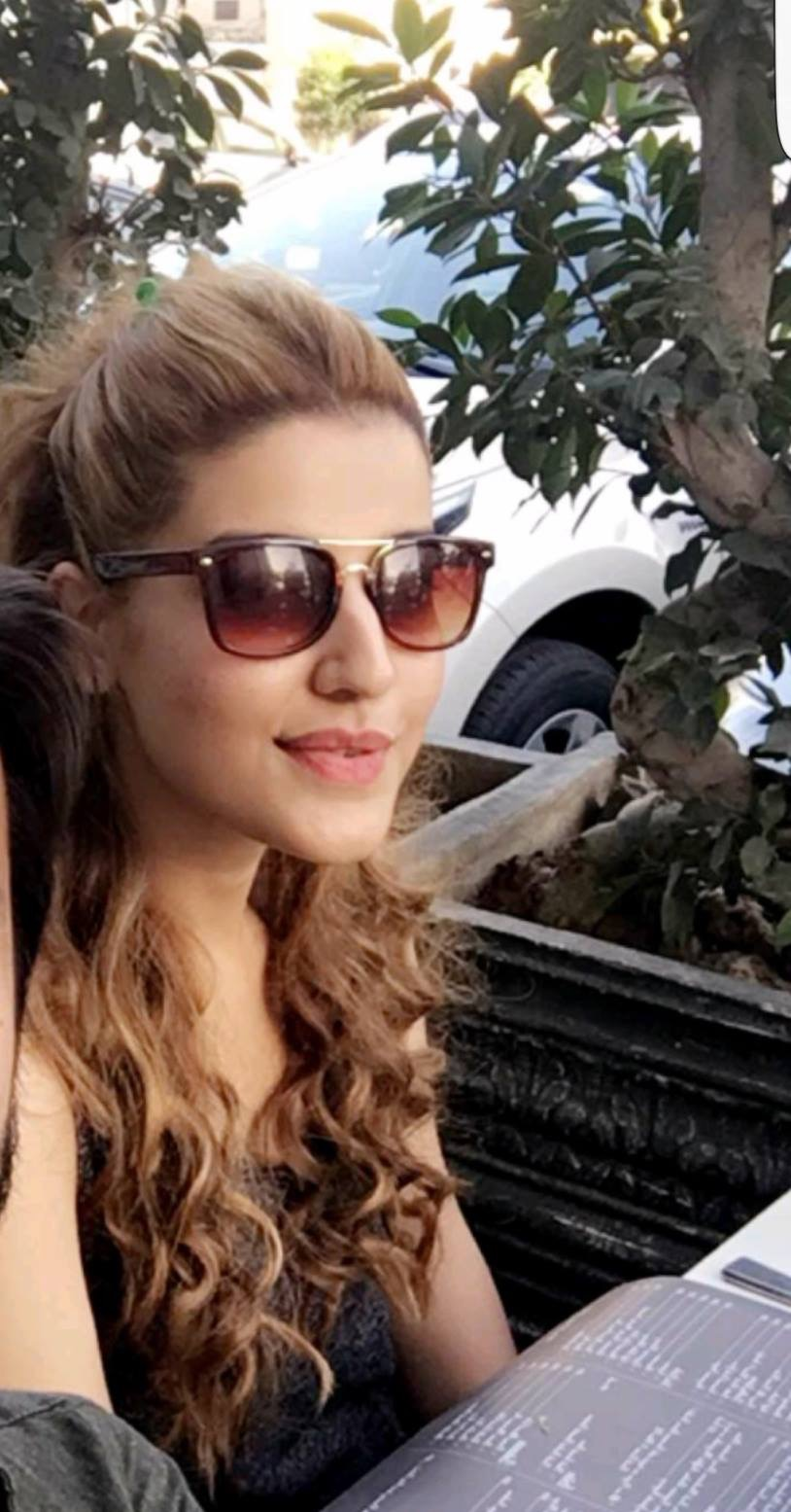
Hareem Farooq

Producer Momina Duraid, writer Farhat Ishtiaq and director Haseeb Hassan mutually chose the cast which includes Abid Ali, Sanam Saeed, Maya Ali, Osman Khalid Butt, Mikaal Zulfiqar, Hareem Farooq and Ali Rehman Khan, for the portrayal of leading characters.

Abid Ali was selected to play Bakhtiyar Khan. Actress Maya Ali and actor Osman Khalid Butt marked their third appearance together as a couple having previously acted in Aik Nayee Cinderella and Aunn Zara. The actors received overwhelming acclaim for their third appearance together as a couple in Diyar-e-Dil. According to Maya Ali, the role of Faarah was the most difficult role she had portrayed.

On 12 October 2014, actress Sanam Saeed joined the ongoing filming thereby confirming her role for Diyar-e-Dil. Saeed was offered the role of Ruhina after the success of her role of Kashaf Murtaza in channel’s series Zindagi Gulzar Hai. Alongside Saeed, Mikaal Zulfiqar was cast to play the role of Behroze. Both marked their second appearance together as a couple after their TV Series Ek Kasak Reh Gayi. Actors Ali Rehman Khan and Hareem Farooq were cast to portray the roles of Arjumand and Suhaib after their success in shows Rishtay Kuch Adhooray Se and Mausam. It was their first appearance together as a couple. Production also chose Behroze Sabzwari, Tara Mehmood, Azra Mansoor, Rasheed Naz, Ahmed Zeb and Eshita Mehboob for the supporting roles of Tajamul, Zuhra, Yasmeen, Beddar, Moeez and Laila respectively.

=== Filming, locations and setting ===
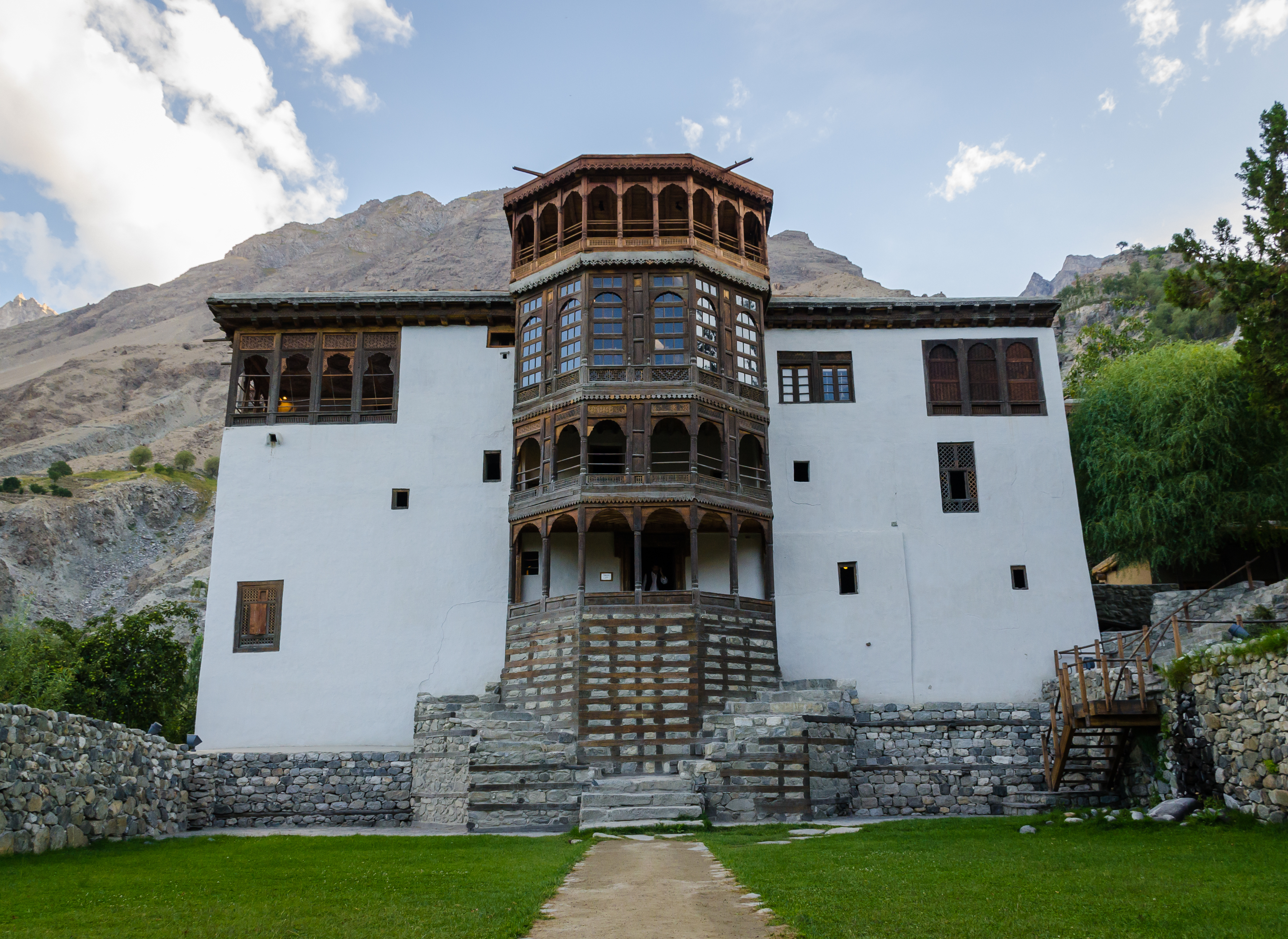
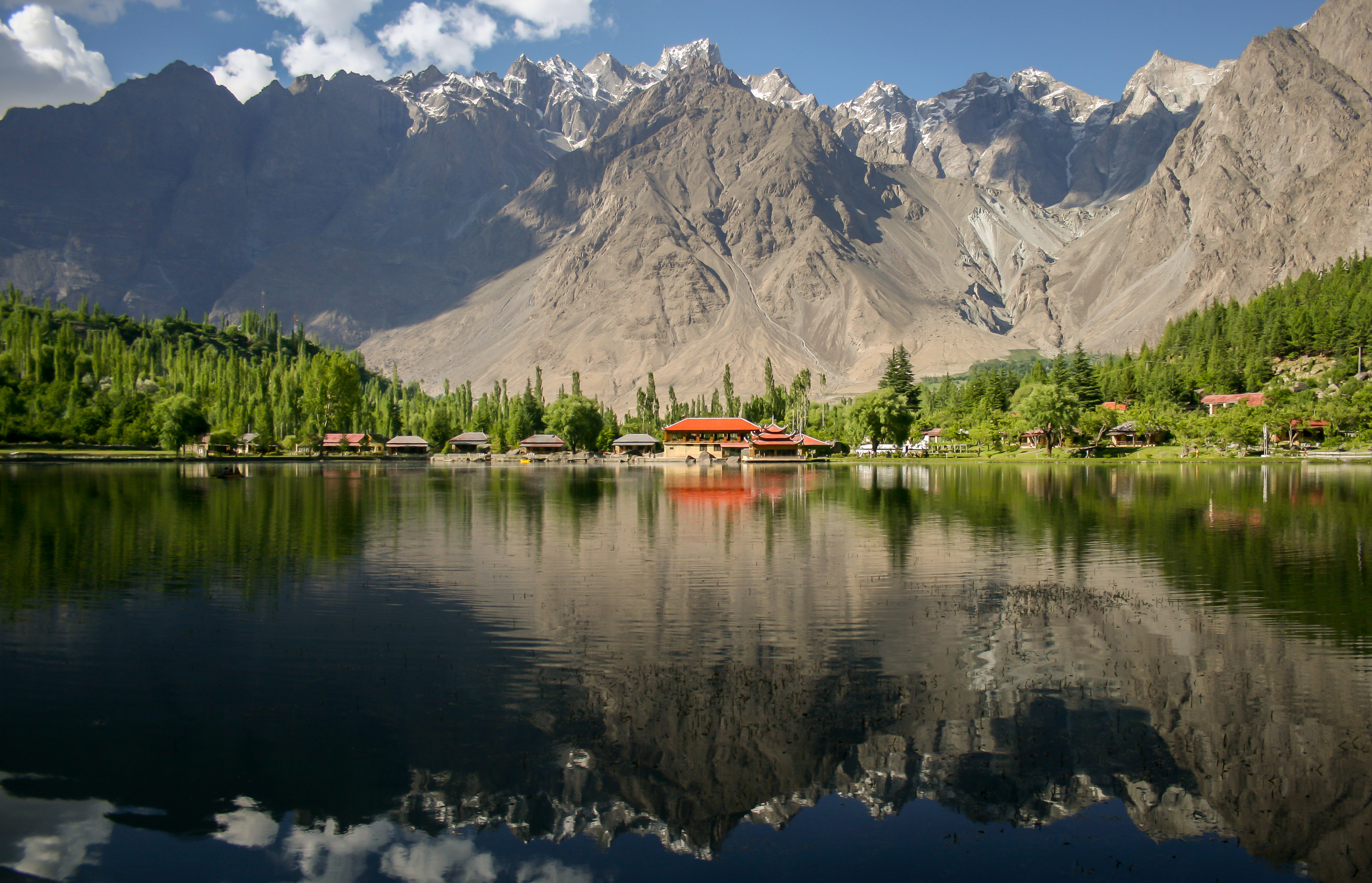
Shooting locations From left to right, Khaplu Palace set as the Pivotal shooting location and Shangrila Resort shown as drop back scenes.

Principal photography and filming began in late September 2014 and finished in early April 2015 with approximately 33 episodes. Shooting was extensively done in hilly areas of Pakistan, production house choose Khaplu Palace for pivotal shooting location, in Skardo, Gilgit–Baltistan which was set as a Mansion. Episodes were also shot in Shangrila Resort and Shangrila Lake was shown in drop up scenes. In early March, channel released promos of serial which were heavily praised for their shooting locations and cast. Series’s original sound track (OST) was recorded in January and was released in March 2015. The series was officially set to premier in May with Friday as prime time-slot. Teasers were released in February along with the OST of serial.

== Music and original soundtrack ==
Diyar-e-Dil OST

Soundtrack album by Zebunnisa Bangash and Momin Durani
- Released: 14 March 2015
- Recorded: 2014
- Genre: Television soundtrack
- Length: 4:55
- Language: Urdu . Persian
- Label: Hum Music
- Producer: Momina Duraid

Music video
- "Diyar-e-Dil" OST on YouTube

The title song of Diyar-e-Dil was composed by musician Shani Arshad who also did background music with Bilal Allah Ditta.The soundtrack consists of two songs, one in Urdu language and the other in Persian language. Lyrics for songs were written by Sabir Zafar. The lines of the song are frequently used during the course of the show. The songs are sung by Zebunnisa Bangash of duo Zeb and Haniya and Momin Durrani. The original sound track was released on 14 March 2015 with the teaser trailer of serial. The song along with production is produced by Momina Duraid under her production company M.D Productions.

=== Track listing ===
All lyrics are written by Sabir Zafar; all music is composed by Shany Haider, Bilal Allah Ditta.

No.	Title	Artist(s)	Length
1.	"Yar-e-Mann"	Zebunnisa Bangash	3:55
2.	"Goyanke-Ishq Aqbat"	Momin Durrani	1:00
Total length:			4:55

== Release and distribution ==
=== Broadcast ===
Hum TV originally scheduled the series for Fridays slot, but Diyar-e-Dil aired an hourly episode on Tuesdays at 8:00 p.m (Pakistan Standard Time). During Ramadan the show timings were shifted to 9:00 pm. Series has also aired internationally, for North America, New Zealand, Australia and Middle East on Hum TV World. It aired on Hum Europe in UK and Europe, on Hum TV USA in USA and Hum TV Mena on UAE. Later in 2021, show was dubbed in Pashto and was released on Hum Pashto 1. In 2022, it began airing in India under Zee Entertainment Enterprises's distribution on their channel Zee Zindagi.

=== Digital release and availability ===
Diyar-e-Dil's episodes went available on Hum TV's YouTube channel till its syndication. Furthermore In January 2017, it had its digital release on the iflix app, but was taken off the same year as per contracted. It was also made available on the Eros Now app. On August 16, 2020, the series was digitally released again on Hum TV's YouTube channel, the same month, it also began streaming digitally in India under channel Zee Zindagi on the ZEE5 app.

== Reception ==
=== Television ratings ===
Number of Episodes	Premiere			Finale			TV Season	Rank (2015)	Overall Rank	Overall viewership
Number of Episodes	Date	Bizasia Ratings	UK Viewers (thousands)	Date	Bizasia Ratings	UK Viewers (thousands)	TV Season	Rank (2015)	Overall Rank	Overall viewership
33	17 March 2015	67.3	82	27 October 2015	76.2	97	2015	#1	#4	70.1

BARB Asian broadcast reported that drama serial's pilot premiered with 8.0 TV ratings on Hum TV and averaged a TRP of 7.5 till its twelfth episode. However, onwards episode fifteenth to episode twentieth, rating fell to an average of 4.0 TRPs. However, onwards episode twentieth, ratings began to increase with an average of 9.0 TRPs due to the plot change of Maya Ali and Osman Khalid Butt’s track. Moreover, twenty-fourth episode scored a rating of 9.7. Thirtieth episode of Diyar-e-Dil received the highest ratings with 14.0 TRPs, This was followed by episode thirty-second with 13 TRPs, and its finale episode with 14 TRPs.

Diyar-e-Dil Target Rating Points (TRPs) : Pakistan viewers per episode (millions)

Season	Episode number																																
Season	1	2	3	4	5	6	7	8	9	10	11	12	13	14	15	16	17	18	19	20	21	22	23	24	25	26	27	28	29	30	31	32	33
1	8.2	8.9	9.0	9.7	8.1	4.8	6.0	4.7	5.5	7.3	5.1	6.9	7.5	7.0	4.0	2.2	1.2	5.6	4.7	9.0	7.0	6.9	8.4	9.7	8.4	7.0	10.0	8.0	8.11	14.07	9.23	13.10	14.0

Source: Barb TRPs

=== Critical reception ===
Actors Abid Ali and Osman Khalid Butt received immense acclaim for their portrayals. Sadaf Haider of the Dawn praised the series' direction, cinematography, characterisation and production saying, "As with any excellent start the only fear is whether team Diyar-e-Dil can maintain the standards it has now set. This serial is a must watch for any drama fan. Farhat Ishtiaq is a great storyteller but this time she has honed her script-writing skills too and Haseeb Hassan has managed to translate this with seamless ease to our screens." She said that, "In many dramas we are shown protagonists, especially women who adapt with unnatural ease to each change of fortune. Director Haseeb Hassan has done a fabulous job of weaving this inter-generational story together combining beautiful cinematography and a fast paced, well-edited narrative to make a highly entertaining serial thus far." In an issue of Dawn June 25, Sadaf said, "As a story, Diyar-e-Dil covers very traditional grounds: the honour and obedience we owe to our parents and the importance of family. These values are deeply ingrained in our culture, something the writer never questions but reinforces with each turn."

Aruba Adil of Aaj News praises it story line and consensus that, "Diyar-e-Dil is different from other soap drama serials". She went to state five reasons that makes it different including, location, cast, realistic relationships, subtle love stories and unpredictable ending. After the premier of series first episode it was listed among the top eleven drama serials of 2015 on place four. It has been ranked on many media outlets of top list drama serials of twenty-fifteen. Sheeba Khan of HIP states the serial is, "As great as the script was, the direction was equally fantastic. Haseeb Hassan took the script and visualized it for us with absolute perfection. The cinematography and presentation was beautiful and it was nice to see the beauty of Pakistan, rather than the US or UK." Commenting on the leads of serial she said, " We got to see more of Wali and Faara along with the dining table in the haveli. It was nice to see the lead pair's banter. With all the hatred Wali says he has of Faara, you can see how completely he is in love with her. In their last scene together, you could see how the hurt in his eyes when Faara tells him off, again!". Writing for BrandSynario, Ghazal Sulaiman praises the chemistry between Sanam and Meekal and said, "All praises for Diyar-e-Dil, this drama seems to have all the elements to be HUM TV’s next hit. With an outstanding entry in the season, the drama is pacing fast and is successfully keeping the viewers hooked. Moreover, the drama’s crisp editing and exceptional direction will make you head over heels in love with the natural scenic beauty of Baltistan."

Almas Akhtar of The Express Tribune praised the series story line, setting, location, casting and concept saying, "Diyar-e-dil the only drama portraying the true dynamics of a tribal family in Pakistan" she further added that the series also portray Male bonding thus attracting male viewers . With the popularity of serial, the portrayal of Wali by Osman was declared the best character of the year alongside Kashaf Murtaza by Sanam Saeed in 2012 drama serial Zindagi Gulzar Hai. Buraq Shabbir of The News also lauded the serial and said, "The themes of love, respect, and family values are recurrent through Diyar-e-Dil. The show does a neat job of exploring various emotions and how damaging it can be if one is arrogant and angry and spends time in a negative structure."

=== Awards and nominations ===
Year	Award	Date	Category	Recipient(s)	Result	Ref.
2016	Hum Awards	April 23, 2016; 28 May 2016 (televised)	Best Drama Serial	Momina Duraid	Won	
2016	Hum Awards	April 23, 2016; 28 May 2016 (televised)	Best Drama Serial - Popular	Momina Duraid	Won	
2016	Hum Awards	April 23, 2016; 28 May 2016 (televised)	Best Director Drama Serial	Haseeb Hassan	Won	
2016	Hum Awards	April 23, 2016; 28 May 2016 (televised)	Best Actor	Meekal Zulfiqar	Won	
2016	Hum Awards	April 23, 2016; 28 May 2016 (televised)	Best Actor - Popular	Osman Khalid Butt	Won	
2016	Hum Awards	April 23, 2016; 28 May 2016 (televised)	Best Actor - Popular	Meekal Zulfiqar	Won	
2016	Hum Awards	April 23, 2016; 28 May 2016 (televised)	Best Actress - Popular	Maya Ali	Won	
2016	Hum Awards	April 23, 2016; 28 May 2016 (televised)	Best Supporting Actor	Ali Rehman Khan	Won	
2016	Hum Awards	April 23, 2016; 28 May 2016 (televised)	Best Supporting Actor	Behroze Sabzwari	Won	
2016	Hum Awards	April 23, 2016; 28 May 2016 (televised)	Best Writer Drama Serial	Farhat Ishtiaq	Won	
2016	Hum Awards	April 23, 2016; 28 May 2016 (televised)	Best Original Soundtrack	Shani Arshad	Won	
2016	Hum Awards	April 23, 2016; 28 May 2016 (televised)	Most Impactful Character	Abid Ali	Won	
2016	Hum Awards	April 23, 2016; 28 May 2016 (televised)	Best Onscreen Couple	Osman Khalid Butt & Maya Ali	Won	
2016	Hum Awards	April 23, 2016; 28 May 2016 (televised)	Best Onscreen Couple - Popular	Osman Khalid Butt & Maya Ali	Nominated	
2016	Hum Awards	April 23, 2016; 28 May 2016 (televised)	Best Actor in a Negative Role	Sanam Saeed	Nominated	
2016	Lux Style Awards	July 29, 2016; 20 August 2016 (televised)	Best TV Play	Momina Duraid,	Won	
2016	Lux Style Awards	July 29, 2016; 20 August 2016 (televised)	Best Original Soundtrack	Momina Duraid	Won	
2016	Lux Style Awards	July 29, 2016; 20 August 2016 (televised)	Best TV Director	Haseeb Hassan	Nominated	
2016	Lux Style Awards	July 29, 2016; 20 August 2016 (televised)	Best TV Writer	Farhat Ishtiaq	Nominated	
2016	Lux Style Awards	July 29, 2016; 20 August 2016 (televised)	Best Actor	Osman Khalid Butt	Nominated	
2016	Lux Style Awards	July 29, 2016; 20 August 2016 (televised)	Best Actress	Maya Ali	Nominated	

== See also ==
- 2015 in Pakistani television
- List of programs broadcast by Hum TV
