= List of Diyar-e-Dil characters =

Main cast of Diyar-e-Dil, from left to right: Wali Suhaib Khan, Suhaib Bakhtiyar Khan, Arjumand Suhaib Khan, Bakhytiyar Khan (middle), Ruhina Behroze Khan, Behroze Bakhtiyar Khan and Faarah Behroze Khan

The characters from the Pakistani drama serial Diyar-e-Dil were created by writer Farhat Ishtiaq based on her book of the same name for Hum TV. The series follows the lives of a dysfunctional family led by Agha Jaan and his sons generation. Each episode follows a serialized sequence of the lives of Wali and Faraah the grandchildren of Agha Jaan who wed under abrupt circumstances and are unable to understand each other. It stars Sanam Saeed, Maya Ali, Osman Khalid Butt, Mikaal Zulfiqar, Hareem Farooq and Ali Rehman Khan.

== Casting and development ==
Cast selection was done by producer Momina Duraid of MD Productions. Sanam Saeed, Maya Ali, Osman Khalid Butt, Mikaal Zulfiqar, Hareem Farooq and Ali Rehman Khan plays the leading roles of Ruhina, Behroze, Faarah, Wali, Arjumand and Suhaib respectively while Abid Ali was selected to play Agha Jaan. Sanam Saeed who had been praised by her excellent role as Kashaf Murtaza in Zindagi Gulzar Hai was offered to play the role of Ruhina and Mikaal Zulfiqar is selected to play the role of Behoroze, while Maya Ali and Osman Khalid Butt marked their third appearance together as a couple having previously acted in Aik Nayee Cinderella and Aunn Zara, both shows tops the ratings charts. Hareem Farooq and Ali Rehman Khan were castes to portray the roles of Arjumand and Suhaib after their success in shows like Rishtay Kuch Adhooray Se and Mausam. Production also chose Behroze Sabzwari, Tara Mehmood, Azra Mansoor, Rasheed Naz, Ahmed Zeb and Eshita Mehboob for the supporting roles of Tajamul, Zuhra, Yasmeen, Beddar, Moeez and Laila respectively. Actors like Behroze, Tara and Ahmed have major appearances in Lahore in initial episodes while actress Eshita has appeared in only a few episodes.

== Characters ==
=== Main ===
- Bakhtiyar Ahmed Khan / Agha Jaan (portrayed by Abid Ali)

Bakhtiyar Khan is a rich landlord and the powerful patriarch of the Khan family. He resides in Gilgit, Baltistan Skardu with his youngest son's family. Agha Jan was a very strict father, he betrothed his elder son Behroze with his niece Arjumand, however as Behroze was in love with someone else, Agha Jan disinherited his son and banished him from the haveli (mansion) and married Arjumand to his younger son Suhaib. As time passed, his family faced several complications, primarily the death of his beloved younger son Suheb,

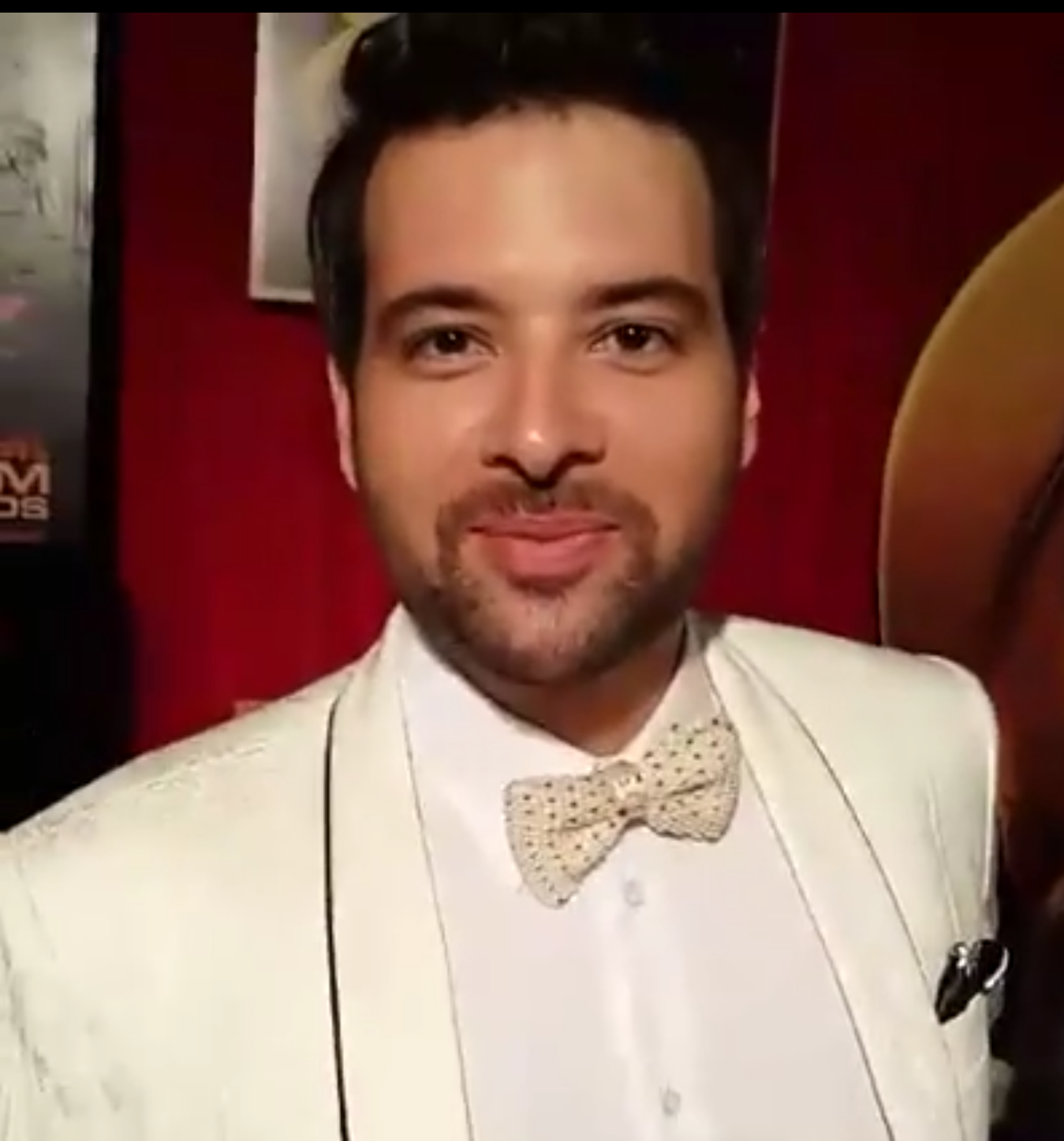
Mikaal Zulfiqar

which changed Agha Jan and made him realize the futility of his ego (which had ostracized his elder son and his family from him for many years), and made him want to see his family reunited.

- Behroze Khan (portrayed by Meekal Zulfiqar)

Behroze Khan is Agha Jan's eldest son, he was Arjumand's fiancé since childhood and was sent to Lahore for his studies. However, as he returned, he revealed that he is in love with Ruhina and wants to marry her instead of Arjumand. This decision of Behroze created disputes between him and Agha Jan, he was banished from the Haveli and started a new life with his wife Ruhina, she later gave birth to their daughter Faarah after suffering a miscarriage. Twenty years passed, with his younger brother Suheb fruitlessly attempting to reconcile him with his father. In their final meeting, Suheb expressed his wish to marry their children to each other which Behroze rejected. Suheb's death finally made Behroz return to the Haveli. He reconciled with Agha Jaan and regretted his decision of keeping his daughter and wife away from their roots, their asl, and tried to make up for it by marrying Faarah to Wali, Suheb's son. However this decision estranged his wife, and to some extent, his daughter from him. Drowning in depression, abandoned by his wife and missing Suhaib, Behroze died from a heart attack and left his entire family in dispute.

- Suhaib Khan (portrayed by Ali Rehman Khan)

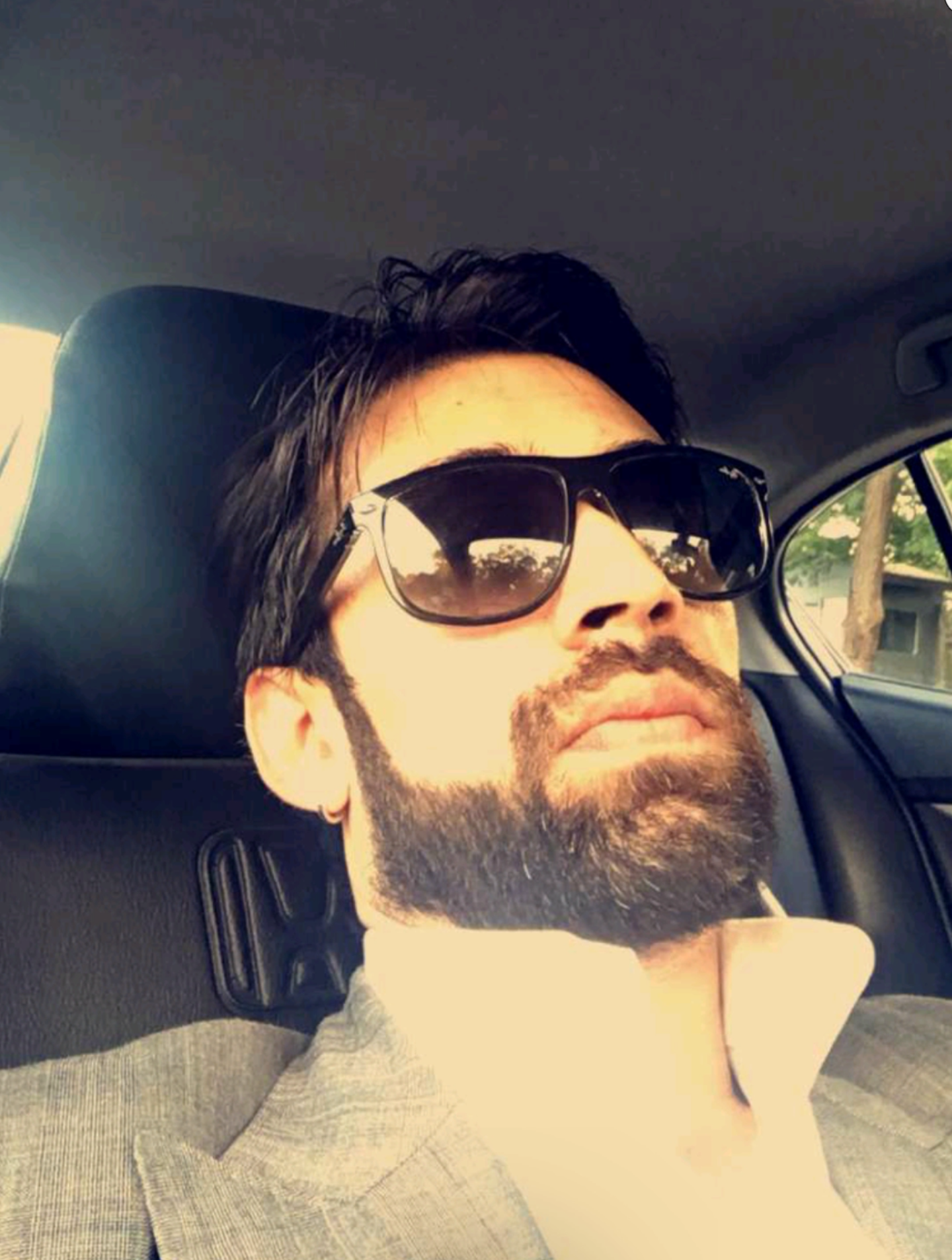
Ali Rehman Khan

Suhaib Khan is Agha Jan's youngest son. He was in love with Laila Feroz Khan, his father's friend's daughter, but was forced by his father to marry his brother's ex-fiancee Arjumand after Behroz left her and married someone else. Initially they had a prickly relationship, with Arjumand blaming him for their parents' and his brother's decision, but after his son Wali's birth, he and Arjumand became closer and eventually fell in love. They later had another child named Zarmeenay. Suhaib lived in the Haveli with his father, and for twenty years attempted to convince his brother and father to forget their egos and reconcile. In his last meeting with Behroz, he expressed the wish to marry Behroz's daughter to his son, which angered Behroz and was rejected by him immediately. He died suddenly soon after this, leaving his family in shock and grief. Although he was careless in his youth, he was shown to be a responsible, selfless and loving man, very family-oriented and caring of his loved ones, qualities that his son Wali is shown to have inherited.

- Ruhina Behroze Khan (portrayed by Sanam Saeed)

Ruhina is an aggressive and furious women, she is Behroze's wife and Faarah's mother. She is Tajamul's sister, Zuhra, Suhaib and Arjumad's sister-in-law, Moeez

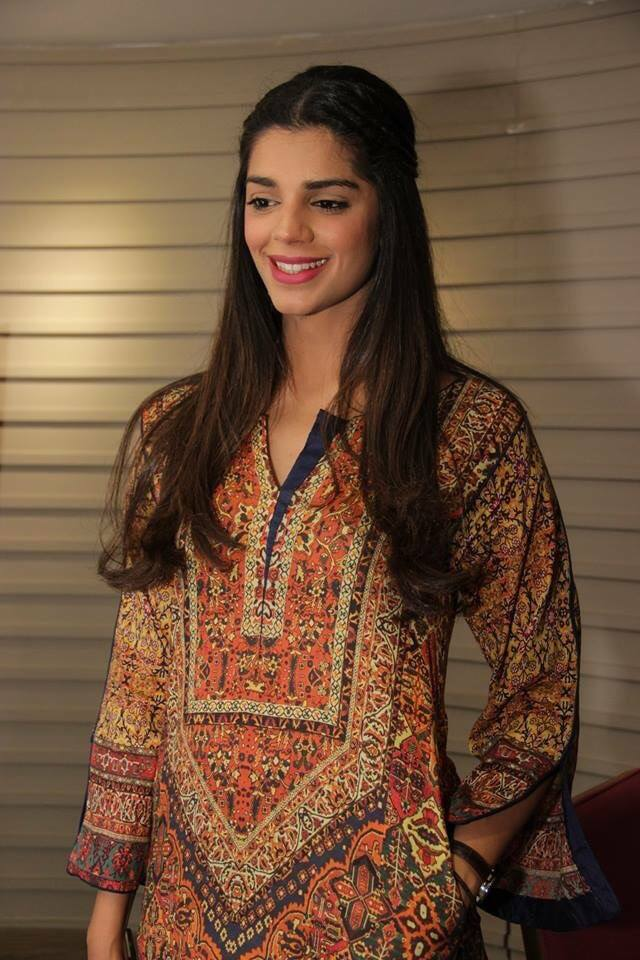
Sanam Saeed

and Wali's Aunt and Agha Jan's eldest daughter-in-law. Ruhina was a very kind hearted and honest girl when she met and married Behroze, she consoled Behroze and helped him when his family banished him from their money and residence. She started her new life with him and eventually the two started earning more income, after her first miscarriage she gave birth to their daughter. She was insulted by Agha Jan when Behroze took her to Haveili, and as a result she started to hate her in-laws, as time passed Zuhra made her completely change and increased her hatred for her in-laws. She considered Moeez to be her Son-in-law and therefore told Faarah to ask divorce form Wali along with the property.

- Arjumand Suhaib Khan (portrayed by Hareem Farooq)

Arjumand is Beddar Khan and Yasmeen Beddar Khan's younger daughter, Nabeela' sister. She was engaged to Behroze since childhood but Behroze betrayed her love and married Ruhina,

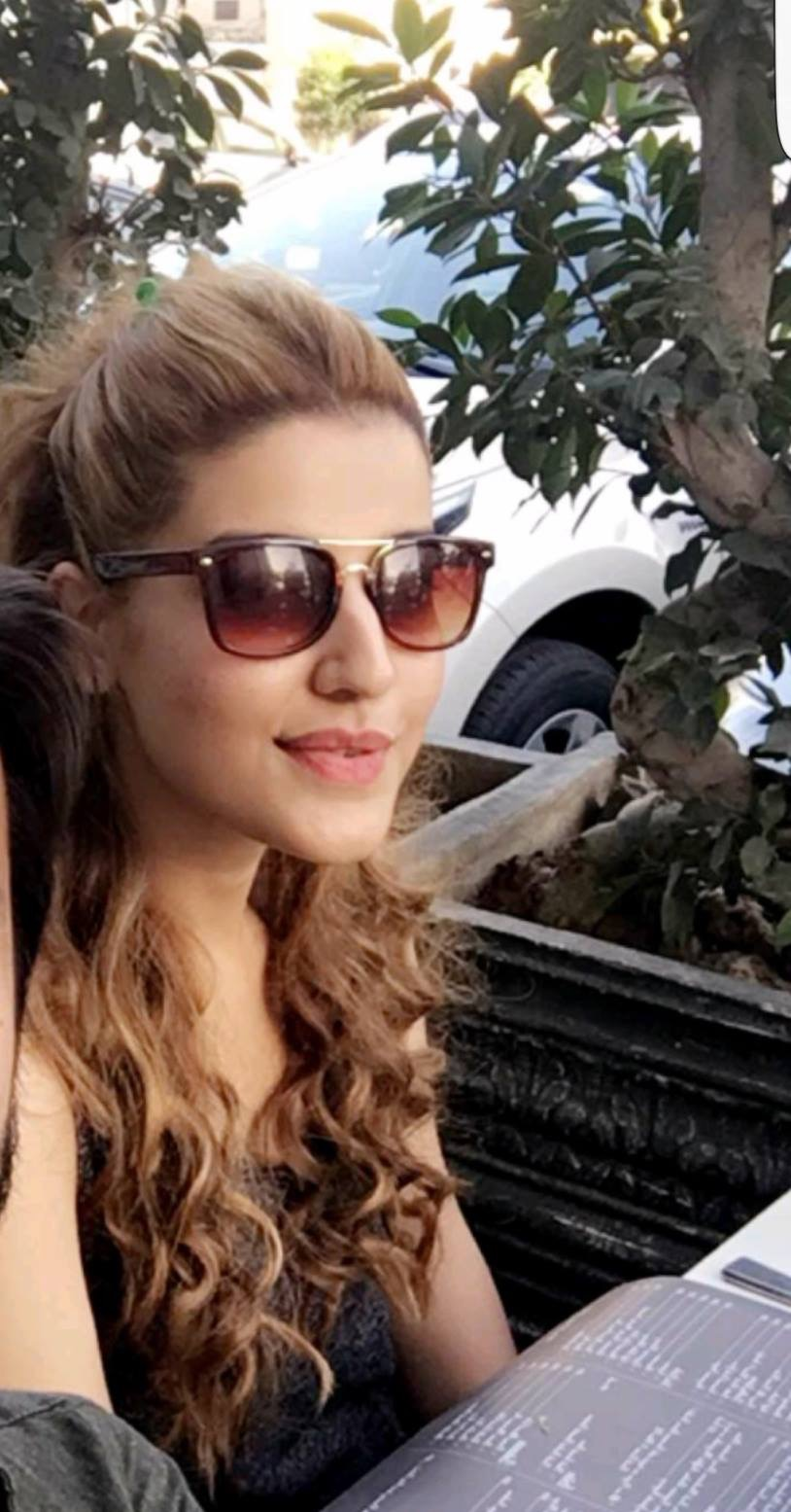
Hareem Farooq

as a result she sacrificed for her families respect by marrying Suhaib. The two hated their relationship in the start but after their son's birth they fell in love. She later gave both to Zarminay and made Agha Jan joyful. As twenty years passed, she became a serious mother and a loving wife. She Alway disliked Ruhina and Faarah and after completed her husbands last wish of Wali's marriage with Faarah. Arjumand has a really different personality to that of Ruhina and took the family issues seriously. When she was left as Suhaib's widow, she took her family's charge and took care of her children and Agha Jan.

- Faraah Wali Khan (portrayed by Maya Ali)

Faarah is Behroze and Ruhina's youngest child, she is a free minded girl who always wants to see her parents happy. Faarah wanted to be a doctor from the start and never met her father family. She was told by her mother that Agha Jan and his entire family hates them and would never except them, after her uncles death her father decided to complete his last wish of her marriage with her cousin Wali. She was forcefully married to Wali and remained confused to choose between Agha Jan or her mother. After her father's death she was forced to ask for property issue which she never wanted, as a result the two began to argue and Ruhina left her along visiting Karachi. As Faarah hated agha Jan, this made Agha Jan more and more sick as a result Wali aggressively took her with him after which she signed an agreement with him which stated that she would live with Agha Jan for three months as his loving daughter-in-law to achieve divorce from Wali. After visiting Haveli, Faarah found out about Behroze's love for his family and got to know about her being wrong all this time. She eventually fell in love with Wali.

- Wali Suhaib Khan (portrayed by Osman Khalid Butt)

Wali is Suhaib and Arjumand's eldest child, he is Agha Jan's grandson, Zarmeenay's brother and Faarah's husband. Wali is a short tempered and aggressive and aggressive man and at the meantime, a kind-hearted person. After his father's death he was married to Faarah, his cousin in order to fulfil his deceased father's last wish. His aunt Ruhina never exerted them as her in-laws and therefore considered them wrong. He love Faarah but after her engagement with Moeez, he started hating her. After Faarah demanded her divorce from Wali, Agha Jan got a serious heart attack which made Wali to aggressively take Faarah with him. The two signed a contract of divorce after three months if Faarah lives with Agha Jan till first of April. However, Wali later saw Faarah's affection towards Agha Jan but remained the same towards her.

- Moeez Tajamul (portrayed by Ahmad Zeb)

Moeez is Tajamul and Zuhra's eldest child and Erum's older brother. He is loyal towards Ruhi and Faarah and always helps them during hard times. After Behroze's death, Moeez constantly remained with them and consoled them. He later starts to feel for Faarah even after knowing that she is Wali's wife, and the two were engaged. By the time he went to Dubai, Wali took Faarah to the Haveli. When he returned he found that Faarah has started to love Agha Jan. It was later revealed that Moeez never loved Ruhi and Faarah and showed her loyalty only for money. He was jealous of Wali's wealth and power and decided to be like him which he could only do by marrying Faarah. He was mostly jealous when Faarah and Wali were together and hated the fact that they are married. He later found out that Faarah loves Wali.

=== Supporting ===
- Zarminay Suhiab Khan (portrayed by Mariyam Nafees)

Zarminay is Suhaib and Arjumand's youngest child and Wali's youngest sister. Zarminay has similar personality to that of her mother and remains with her most of the time. She loves Agha Jan and her family but was never introduced to her uncles family until her father's death. She respected Behroze and Wali, but hated Ruhina and Faarah and Agha Jan mostly gets ill due to their doings. Zarminay attended Faarah and Wali's marriage, she later applied of medical college and was also given the proposal of Ibad who happens to be Agha Jan's close friend's grandson. After Wali bought Faarah to Haveli on their contract, Zarminay started ignoring her and once yelled at her looking to Agha Jan's health. However, after seeing Agha Jan's love and affection in Faarah's eyes, Zarminay apologised with her and the two bonded. She was then mostly seen with Faarah and decides to help her stay in Haveli and make Wali understand her true feelings.

- Beddar Bakht (portrayed by Rasheed Naz)

Beddar Khan is Arjumand's father, Agha Jan's brother and Yasmeen's husband. Beddar is a kind and polite man who trusts his brother more than any other thing. He gave his daughter Arjumand to Agha Jan there by engaging her to Behroze but after Behroze's betrayal, he agreed to Agha Jan's decision of Suhaib and Arjumand's wedding. Beddar later became grandfather after Wali and Zarmeenay's birth. However, before the time skip, he and Yasmeen died.

- Yasmeen Beddar Khan (portrayed by Azra Mansoor)

Yasmeen Beddar Khan is Arjumand's mother, Beddar's wife and Agha Jan's sister-in-law. Yasmeen is a kind polite women who always respects her husband and brother-in-law's decision. She gave her daughter Arjumand to Agha Jan there by engaging her to Behroze but after Behroze's betrayal, she agreed to Beddar and Agha Jan's decision of Suhaib and Arjumand's wedding. Yasmeen became grandmother after Wali and Zarminay's birth and died before the time skip.

- Laila Feroze Khan (portrayed by Eshita Mehboob)

Laila is Feroz Khan's daughter who happens to be Agha Jan's best friend. Laila is a very kind and mature women, she was in relationship with Agha Jan's youngest son Suhaib, the two were about to get engaged but as Behroze's betrayal to Arjumand, Suhaib's marriage was fixed with Arjumand instead. Laila sacrificed her love for Suhaib's family and decided to start a new life. After twenty years she coincidentally met Suhaib in a business meeting. The two had lunch where Suhaib invited her to their Haveli and considered his daughter, Zarminay's marriage proposal with her son Ibad. Laila at tented Suhaib's funeral and confronted Behroze telling him how his brother sacrificed for him.

- Tajamul Arsalan (portrayed by Behroze Sabzwari)

Tajamul is Ruhina's elder brother. He is Zuhra's husband, Moeez and Iram's father, Faarah's uncle and Behroze's brother-in-law. Tajamul was fully against Ruhina and Behroze's marriage, he broke all his relation's with Ruhi and sent her away from him. However, after her miscarriage he forgave her. It was later revealed that Tajamul actually forgave Ruhi looking at Behroze's wealth. After his death he forced Ruhi to demand for Faarah's property and used their money for his own good there by lying to them. He, Zuhra and Moeez have always planned to get money from Ruhina and later put Moeez's proposal for her.

- Zuhra Tajamul (portrayed by Tara Mahmood)

Zuhra is Tajamul's wife, Moeez and Iram's mother, Ruhi's sister-in-law and Faarah's Aunt. Zuhra has always been against Ruhi and hated her. She was always jealous of Behroze, Faarah and Ruhi and starting using their money for her living. Zuhra along with Husband and children fooled Ruhi and later forced her to ask for Faarah's property from her in-laws. She also forced her to ask for Faarh's divorce so she can marry Moeez, her son.
