= List of Diyar-e-Dil episodes =

Diyar-e-Dil release poster

Diyar-e-Dil is a Pakistani television series produced by Momina Duraid, aired on Hum TV. It is based on the novel of same name by Farhat Ishtiaq. The series is directed by Haseeb Hassan. Diyar-e-Dil focuses on the issue of split family with broken relations. The story concludes a moral lessons regarding respect, love and care in relationships.

== Episodes ==
No.	Title	Directed by	Written by	Runtime	Original release date	PAK viewers (thousands)	U.K. viewers (thousands)
1	"Episode 1"	Haseeb Hassan	Farhat Ishtiaq and Muhammad Wasi-ul-din	39:05	17 March 2015	67.3	82
Bakhtiyar Khan / Agha Jaan, is a landlord and head of his family with two sons Behroze Khan and Suhaib Khan. Agha Jaan arranges the marriage of Behroze who studies in Karachi, and his niece Arjumand Beddar Khan as they have been engaged since childhood. Meanwhile Agha Jaan sends Suhaib to pick his friend's (Feroze Khan) daughter Laila Feroze Khan from her hostel. Both fall in love. After coming home, Behroze misbehaves with Arjumand. Behroze explains that he doesn't want to marry Arjumand as he loves Ruhina, his classmate and he never accepted this engagement. Ruhina tells her brother Tajamul that she is in love with Behroze, and wants to marry him. Behroze tells Agha Jaan about his love for Ruhina, but Agha Jaan angrily tells him that he will only accept Arjumand as his daughter-in-law.
2	"Episode 2"	Haseeb Hassan	Farhat Ishtiaq and Muhammad Wasi-ul-din	37:45	24 March 2015	73.6	89
After an argument with Agha Jaan, Behroze tells Arjumand's parents that he can't marry Arujumand because he loves someone else. Agha Jaan orders him to leave the house and disinherits him from his property. Agha Jaan asks Suhaib to marry Arjumand. Laila asks Suhaib that he refuse to marry Arjumand, but Suhaib tells her that he loves Agha Jaan and cannot refuse his father's requests. Behroze visits Ruhina and tells her what has happened. Ruhina asks her brother Tajamul to allow her and Behroze to get married. Tajamul refuses and tells Behroze that he can marry Ruhina once his parents agree to their marriage.
3	"Episode 3"	Haseeb Hassan	Farhat Ishtiaq and Muhammad Wasi-ul-din	35:25	31 March 2015	42.3	90
Ruhina tells her brother that she will only marry Behroze. Tajamul reluctantly agrees, but warns her that she would not be welcomed back if her marriage were to fail. Arjumand and Suhaib and Behroze and Ruhina get married. Behroze takes Ruhina to his friend's apartment until he finds a place where they can both live. Suhaib and Laila decide to separate after she becomes aware of his wedding to Arjumand.
4	"Episode 4"	Haseeb Hassan	Farhat Ishtiaq and Muhammad Wasi-ul-din	37:28	7 April 2015	86.6	97
Behroze and Ruhina move into their new home. Arjumand and Suhaib are unhappy with their current predicament. Behroze and Ruhina goes to Agha Jaan house to reconcile, but Agha Jaan insults Ruhina and praises Arjumand and Suhaib for their understanding. Agha Jaan tells them never to come back again.
5	"Episode 5"	Haseeb Hassan	Farhat Ishtiaq and Muhammad Wasi-ul-din	39:53	14 April 2015	72.1	81
Suhaib is unhappy at Agha Jaan's decision. Ruhina is bitter at Agha Jaan's for his treatment towards her, but Behroze warns her that he will not tolerate anything negative against his father. Suhaib and Arjumand prepare to leave for Islamabad. Ruhina gets pregnant, and tells Behroze the news. Agha Jaan visits Suhaib and Arjumand and tells them to start a new life. Ruhina miscarries and blames herself. Ruhina's brother meets Behroze at the hospital and finds out what Agha Jaan did to him. Tajamul forgives Ruhina and both reconcile. Behroze, on the other hand feels disheartened for abandoning Agha Jaan.
6	"Episode 6"	Haseeb Hassan	Farhat Ishtiaq and Muhammad Wasi-ul-din	40:25	21 April 2015	42.6	48
Suhaib and Arjumand return to the Kohat after the completion of Suhaib's studies Arjumand now pregnant, is still unhappy with their marriage and blames Suhaib for her predicament. Behroze does well academically and gets a well paying job. Arjumand tells Suhaib what she feels towards to him and their child, who forgives her. Arjumand gives birth to their son, who they name Wali Suhaib Khan. Suhaib and Behroze reminisce their childhood memories and of the time when they were both happy.
7	"Episode 7"	Haseeb Hassan	Farhat Ishtiaq and Muhammad Wasi-ul-din	30:36	28 April 2015	43.0	60
Behroze misses Agha Jaan while Arjumand and Suhaib agree to forget their past. Suhaib tries to help Behroze financially and asks Gul Khan to keep an eye on them. Ruhina gives birth to a girl they name Faarah Khan. Suhaib visits Lahore to see his niece but sees Behroze who warns him to stay away from them and to not help him ever again.
8	"Episode 8"	Haseeb Hassan	Farhat Ishtiaq and Muhammad Wasi-ul-din	36:54	5 May 2015	36.3	47
Arjumand and Suhaib are living with Agha Jaan and their children Wali and Zarminey. Behroze and Ruhina have one child Faarah, who is pursuing her career in Medicine. Ruhina and her brother live next to each other, both having children of same age. When Faraah asks Ruhina about her grandparents, Ruhina tells her that how Agha Jaan disinherited Behroze after marrying her. Suhaib visits Behroze for a reconciliation, and that Agha Jaan misses him and Faraah. Suhaib also expresses a desire for a marriage between Faraah and Wali. Suhaib encounters Laila on a way to a business meeting.
9	"Episode 9"	Haseeb Hassan	Farhat Ishtiaq and Muhammad Wasi-ul-din	40:18	12 May 2015	55.4	-- ^{1}
Suhaib learns that Laila has a son Abad-ur-Rehman. Suhaib expresses his wish to Arjumand that Abad and Zarminay's get married. Suhaib ask Agha Jaan to forgive Behroze and Ruhina to which Agha Jaan agrees. Suhaib also tells Agha Jaan that he wants Wali to marry Faarah. An unknown incident leads to Suhaib's death which breaks Aghaa Jaan and Behroze. Behroze returns to Haveli and meets Agha Jaan.
10	"Episode 10"	Haseeb Hassan	Farhat Ishtiaq and Muhammad Wasi-ul-din	37:17	19 May 2015	60.5	73
Agha Jaan suffers heart attack when he hears of son's death. Behoroze and Wali are both struck by grief and commiserate. Behroze calls Ruhina to let her know his reasons for staying, upon which she gets angry and ask him to come back. Laila meets Behroze at the hospital and tells him the story of Suhaib and Arjumand's marriage
11	"Episode 11"	Haseeb Hassan	Farhat Ishtiaq and Muhammad Wasi-ul-din	35:57	26 May 2015	49.4	51
Ruhina believes that Behroze has been manipulated by his father. Behroze meets with father after Suhaib's death and expresses his wish that Faarah and Wali get married. Agha Jaan is reluctant but agrees in accordance to Suhaib's last wish. Behroze convinces Arjumand and Wali as well. Behroze calls Ruhina to ask her to come to haveli with Faraah. Ruhina, unaware of the marriage proposal, agrees and goes to the haveli along with Faarah.
12	"Episode 12"	Haseeb Hassan	Farhat Ishtiaq and Muhammad Wasi-ul-din	42:09	2 June 2015	23.4	--
Faarah and Ruhina reaches the haveli where Farrah, Wali and Zarminay become friends. Ruhina is angry at Behroze and thinks that he is ignoring her and is paying more attention to Agha Jaan. Behroze tells Faarah about the love he had for Suhaib. Behroze shocks Ruhina by telling her about the marriage proposal which she rejects thinking that it is Agha Jaan's planning for revenge. Agha Jaan tells Ruhina to forget the past and start a new life at the haveli.
13	"Episode 13"	Haseeb Hassan	Farhat Ishtiaq and Muhammad Wasi-ul-din	42:22	9 June 2015	66.4	75
Ruhina asks Faarah to refuse to marry Wali, but Faarah reluctantly marries Wali despite her objection. Ruhina angrily blames Behroze for destroying Faarah's life. Behroze asks Wali to take care of Faarah. Later, Faarah, Behorze and Ruhina returns to Lahore for Faarah's studies. Upon their return, Ruhina goes to live with her brother. Behroze tries to explain to Ruhina, but she asks Behroze to choose between Agha Jaan and her. Behroze refuses.
14	"Episode 14"	Haseeb Hassan	Farhat Ishtiaq and Muhammad Wasi-ul-din	42:22	16 June 2015	60.8	70
Ruhina and Faraah leaves Behroze to live with her brother. When Faraah checks up on him, Behroze tells her that he wants to go back to the haveli with Ruhina and her. Wali calls Faraah and asks her to contact Behroze. When Faraah goes to check up on Behroze, she finds her father dead. Tajamul, his family, Ruhina, Agha Jaan and Wali come to Lahore when they find out. Agha Jaan requests permission to take Behroze's body back to the haveli. Ruhina refuses and blames Agha Jaan for Behroze's death. Wali then tells everyone that it was Behroze wish to be buried next to Suhaib's grave.
15	"Episode 15"	Haseeb Hassan	Farhat Ishtiaq and Muhammad Wasi-ul-din	39:01	23 June 2015	42.7	49
Ruhina agrees to have Behroze buried alongside Suhaib. Ruhina blames Agha Jaan for Behroze's death which causes Agha Jaan to fall seriously ill. On recovering, Agha Jaan asks for Ruhina and Faarah, but Wali lies that they had to leave because of Faarah's exams.
16	"Episode 16"	Haseeb Hassan	Farhat Ishtiaq and Muhammad Wasi-ul-din	38:27	30 June 2015	44.2	--
Behram tells Agha Jaan what happened at Behroze's funeral. Agha Jaan and Wali visit Ruhina to take them back to haveli. Ruhina gets upset on hearing this, and asks Wali to agree to divorce Faarah, if he really cares about them. Agha Jaan leaves, saying that they will come again to take them back. Faarah continue her studies with the constant support of Moeez. Tajamul suggests Ruhina ask Agha Jaan to help pay for their upkeep.
17	"Episode 17"	Haseeb Hassan	Farhat Ishtiaq and Muhammad Wasi-ul-din	35:58	7 July 2015	38.6	--
Wali gets himself admitted to a local university so that he can look after the family business in addition to studying. Agha Jaan visits Ruhi and Faarah and ask Ruhi again to return to haveli but Ruhi refuses once again, but asks that Agha Jaan take care of Faarah's educational expenses instead. Faarah is angry at Ruhina for taking money from Agha Jaan. Meanwhile, Agha Jaan sends Wali to Lahore to open a joint account. Wali tries to convince her that they don't hate her and Ruhina and Agha Jaan is not responsible for ruining her life.
18	"Episode 18"	Haseeb Hassan	Farhat Ishtiaq and Muhammad Wasi-ul-din	35:51	14 July 2015	42.7	56
Agha Jaan and Wali arrives at Lahore for Faarah's medical admission. Moeez apologizes to Faarah for his behavior and they both reconcile. Ruhina's brother and his wife have been swindling Ruhina for money. Agha Jaan shows Wali a newly built portion of their house for Faarah and Ruhina. Wali informs Agha Jaan that Faarah has withdrawn seven hundred thousand rupees from their mutual account, upon which Agha Jaan ignores.
19	"Episode 19"	Haseeb Hassan	Farhat Ishtiaq and Muhammad Wasi-ul-din	40:35	21 July 2015	45.6	47
Faarah and Ruhina argue over the money that Faraah gave Ruhina. Moeez confronst her mother for taking money from Ruhina. Agha Jaan invites Ruhina and Faarah for Behroze and Suhaib's death anniversary which Ruhina refuses to attend. Agha Jaan and Arjumand visits Faarah where Ruhina and Arjumand meet each other. Ruhina tells Arjumand that Faarah will divorce Wali.
20	"Episode 20"	Haseeb Hassan	Farhat Ishtiaq and Muhammad Wasi-ul-din	39:29	28 July 2015	37.2	41
Tajamul asks Ruhina to consider Moeez's proposal for Faraah, which she accepts. Moeez takes Faraah to a restaurant to formally propose to her. Wali sees this and warns Faraah that he would not divorce her. Ruhina hires a lawyer to handle Faraah and Wali's divorce case. Wali receives legal notice from Faraah asking for a divorce along with a share of property. Arjumand and Agha Jaan visit Faraah where she accepts that she has asked for divorce, but they inform Faraah that Ruhina has also asked for a share of property.
21	"Episode 21"	Haseeb Hassan	Farhat Ishtiaq and Muhammad Wasi-ul-din	35:17	4 August 2015	36.6	50
Faarah accepts that she has asked for divorce, but she is shocked to learn that her mother has also asked for a share of Agha Jaan's property. After Agha Jaan leaves, Faarah asks Ruhina a reason for asking for a share of Agha Jaan's property. Faarah tells Ruhina that she is fed up of her and Agha Jaan's disputes and wants to be free and will not let anyone use her money. Ruhina angrily leaves the house and moves to Karachi. Agha Jaan suffers a second heart attack. Wali is told by the doctor that if certain problems persist, Agha Jaan could die within one year. Wali hears Agha Jaan expressing his love for Faarah. He forcibly enters Faarah's home and takes her to his car.
22	"Episode 22"	Haseeb Hassan	Farhat Ishtiaq and Muhammad Wasi-ul-din	38:54	11 August 2015	35.5	49
Wali takes Faarah to their farm house to hold her as a hostage. He blames her for Agha Jaan's condition. He offers Faarah a contract which states that if she agrees to stay in haveli with Agha Jaan for three months, he will agree to divorce Faraah, to which she agrees. Agha Jaan's health begin to improve on seeing Faraah. When Arjumand questions Wali about bringing Faraah to the haveli, he explains that he has taken this decision for the sake of Agha Jaan's health.
23	"Episode 23"	Haseeb Hassan	Farhat Ishtiaq and Muhammad Wasi-ul-din	40:41	18 August 2015	41.5	44
Unaware of the agreement between Wali and Faraah, Arjumand accepts Faraah though Zarminay keeps her distance. When Ruhina informs Moeez about Faraah and her situation, he gets upset. Faraah tells Moeez that she came to havelli of her own will, but keeps the information about contract secret. Zarminay confronts Faraah and blames her for Agha Jaan health. Moeez calls Faraah and tells her that he is coming to take her back, but she refuses and tells him that she will return in a few months.
24	"Episode 24"	Haseeb Hassan	Farhat Ishtiaq and Muhammad Wasi-ul-din	37:32	25 August 2015	30.9	40
Faraah starts to mend her relations with Agha Jaan, but tension between her and Wali still remains. It is then revealed that Moeez has asked Ruhina to seek inheritance during Faraah's divorce. Faraah dreams of her father explaining his mistake of abandoning his family and that haveli is her true home. Faraah and Agha Jaan reconcile for the sake of Behroze. Wali sees Faraah and Agha Jaan getting close.
25	"Episode 25"	Haseeb Hassan	Farhat Ishtiaq and Muhammad Wasi-ul-din	38:03	1 September 2015	50.3	64
Arjumand warns Faraah that they will not tolerate any of her disruptive behaviour. Agha Jaan's friend Feroze Khan sends proposal of his grandson Ibad-ul-Rehman (son of Laila) for Zarminay. Moeez comes to the haveli to bring Faraah back, who refuses. Arjumand questions Wali about Faraah and her stay at haveli, and warns Wali not to trust her. When Faraah came to know about Zarminay proposal, she ponders why she was not asked before the marriage between her and Wali was arranged.
26	"Episode 26"	Haseeb Hassan	Farhat Ishtiaq and Muhammad Wasi-ul-din	37:47	8 September 2015	47.2	--
Agha Jan asked Faarah to take him on area of the haveli built for her and Ruhina. Faraah realizes Agha Jaan's love and affection for her and Ruhina. Agha Jaan also tells her that her marriage was Behroze's last wish whereas Zarminay's situation is different. He also asks her to convince Ruhina for reconciliation. He adds that he would ask Wali to divorce her if that is what she wants. Faarah starts to develop a soft corner for Wali.
27	"Episode 27"	Haseeb Hassan	Farhat Ishtiaq and Muhammad Wasi-ul-din	37:53	15 September 2015	89.0	100
Faraah admits her mistakes to Wali and improves her relationship with Zarminey. Moeez fails to manipulate Farah, who says that her Agha Jaan is more important to her than Moeez. Faraah destroys the contract she had signed with Wali. Faraah tries to repair her relationship with Wali, who seems to resent her. Faraah tells Zarminey that she wants to continue her relationship with Wali and the rest of the family.
28	"Episode 28"	Haseeb Hassan	Farhat Ishtiaq and Muhammad Wasi-ul-din	40:39	22 September 2015	39.6	50
Arjumand, Wali become more and more distant with Faraah grow increasingly distant as Arjumand still thinks that Faraah hasn't changed. Moeez came to the haveli to take Faraah back, but she refuses and asks Moeez to never come back. Faraah admits her mistakes to Wali and tells him that she doesn't want a divorce because of what it will do to Agha Jaan. Wali however tells her that he doesn't want her to stay because to Agha Jaan, but rather that she would want to be with him. Agha Jaan ask Arjumand to forgive Faraah for her mistakes.
29	"Episode 29"	Haseeb Hassan	Farhat Ishtiaq and Muhammad Wasi-ul-din	37:42	29 September 2015	51.1	66
Arjumand asks Wali to stay away from Faraah and to convince Agha Jaan for divorce. Agha Jaan ask Faraah to go back to Ruhina and to complete her education. Ruhina finds out that Moeez had Faraah's share of the property all along. Ruhina confronts her brother and sister in law and blames them for ruining her life, upon which Moeez locks her in a room.
30	"Episode 30"	Haseeb Hassan	Farhat Ishtiaq and Muhammad Wasi-ul-din	32:35	6 October 2015	140.7	119^{2}
Tajamul and Zuhra set Ruhina free and assures her that Faraah is fine. Faraah is hurt by Arjumand's behaviour towards her and starts to cry in the balcony, watched by Wali. Ruhina calls Faraah to warn her Moeez's intentions, but Wali picks up the phone and Ruhina tells him instead. Wali searches for Faraah only to find out that Moeez has already kidnapped her. He leaves for Lahore to meet Zuhra. They searches for Faraah together . They find out where Faraah is being kept from Moeez's business partner Omar. Moeez and Wali have fight during which shots are fired.
31	"Episode 31"	Haseeb Hassan	Farhat Ishtiaq and Muhammad Wasi-ul-din	39:45	13 October 2015	92.3	80
Wali, Faraah and Arjumand return to the haveli, much to Arjumand's resentment. Ruhina apologizes to Agha Jaan for her mistakes, and admits that she is responsible for all the troubles in their lives. Arjumand tells Wali that she does not mind Faraah but cannot bear to see Ruhina at the haveli. Ruhina tells Agha Jaan that she blames her brother and her nephew Moeez for all their troubles and severs all ties with them. Tajamul confronts Moeez in jail and blames him for their troubles.
32	"Episode 32"	Haseeb Hassan	Farhat Ishtiaq and Muhammad Wasi-ul-din	35:51	20 October 2015	131.0	102
Tajamul acknowledges his mistakes to Ruhina and asks for forgiveness. Ruhina ask Wali to continue his marriage with Faraah and to forgive them. Faraah reveals to Ruhina that Wali had brought her to haveli as a part of agreement they made because of Agha Jaan's deteriorating health. Ruhina asks Arjumand for forgiveness for her mistakes to Arjumand and asks her to accept Faraah as Wali's wife, which she rejects. It is revealed that Behorze had request Arjumand to accept a proposal for Wali and Faraah marriage as he was ill. Arjumand told Wali that she has forgiven Faraah and will accept Faraah as her daughter in law if he wants. Faraah tries to request Wali not to end their relationship, but Wali tells her that Faraah need not worry about what others will say. They will continue to remain friends after their divorce.
33	"Last Episode"	Haseeb Hassan	Farhat Ishtiaq and Muhammad Wasi-ul-din	38:38	27 October 2015	76.2	TBD
Faraah tells Agha Jaan that Wali hates her and doesn't want to stay married. Agha asks Wali for an explanation for his behavior with Faraah to which he replies that he wants Faraah to admit her love for him. She assumes that he is trying to arrange for the divorce papers after overhearing Wali's conversation. At the dinner table, Wali states that he has an announcement to make at midnight. When Wali, Ruhina, Arjumand, Zarminey, Agha Jaan and Faraah gather at midnight for the announcement, there is a power outage. Faraah leaves without hearing Wali's announcement under cover of darkness. She run anxiously to the haveli and mistakenly sleeps in Wali's room thinking it to be Agha Jaan's room. Later, Wali reveals to everyone that he wants to marry Faraah and every one is happy with this decision. Wali finds Faraah sleeping in his room and leaves without waking her up. Wali wakes her up in the morning to talk of the agreement they made three months ago, and tells her that his lawyer has sent divorce papers, and that everyone agrees with their decision to separate. Faraah admits to Wali that she does not want a divorce anymore. Wali then tells Faraah that it was all an act to get her to admit her love for him.

== Note ==
- ^1 Station did not report the data for particular episode.
- ^2 Figure exceeding 100 represents viewership in millions.
