= Maya Ali =

Pakistani actress (born 1989)

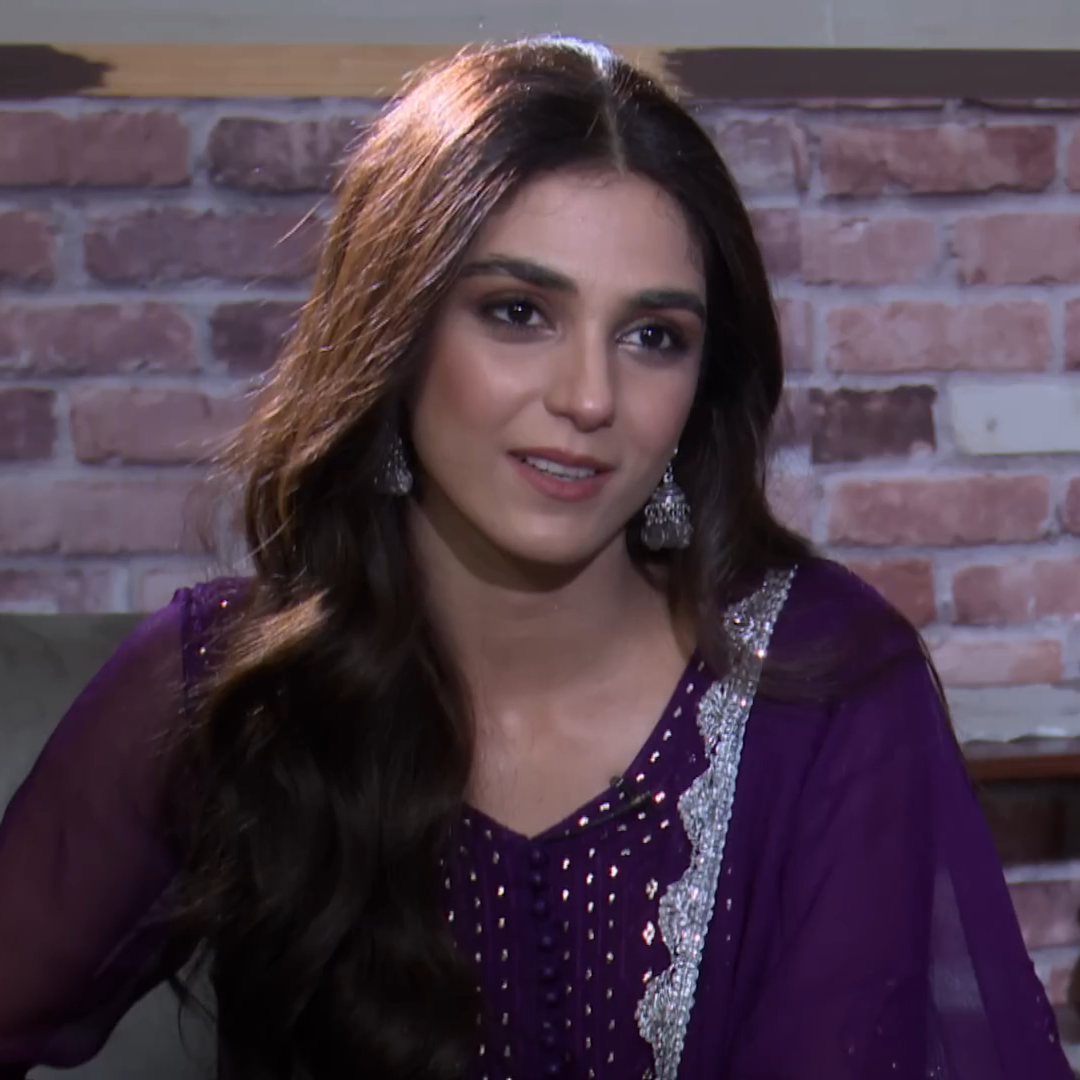
- Ali in 2020
- Born: Maryam Tanveer Ali; Lahore, Punjab, Pakistan
- Education: Queen Mary College (MSc)
- Occupation: Actress
- Years active: 2012–present

Maryam Tanveer Ali known professionally Maya Ali, is a Pakistani actress who works in Urdu films and television series. She has received several accolades, including a Lux Style Award and three Hum Awards.

Ali began her career with a brief role in the telenovela Durr-e-Shehwar but gained wider recognition as the titular character in the romantic comedy Aunn Zara (2013) and as a veiled Muslimah in the social drama Shanakht (2014). She achieved her breakthrough with the romantic drama Mann Mayal (2016), which earned her the Lux Style Award for Best TV Actress. She also found success with the romantic drama Mera Naam Yousuf Hai and the ensemble family drama Diyar-e-Dil (both 2015), with the latter earning her an additional Lux Style Award nomination for Best Actress.

Building on her television success, Ali ventured into films with the romantic comedies Teefa in Trouble (2018) and Parey Hut Love (2019), both of which rank among the highest-grossing Pakistani films of all time. The latter also earned her two Lux Style Award nominations. After a five-year hiatus from acting, she returned to television with the romantic drama Pehli Si Muhabbat (2021).

== Early life ==
Maya Ali was born Maryam Tanveer Ali in Lahore, Punjab, Pakistan, to Punjabi Muslim parents. Her father, Tanveer Ali, was a businessman, and her mother, Shagufta Nazar, is a homemaker. She has one younger brother, Afnan. Initially, Ali's father disapproved of her joining the film industry and ultimately did not speak to her for eight years. However, they reconciled before his passing in 2016.

Ali started her career at an early age, working as a video jockey for the channels Samaa TV, Waqt News and Dunya News. She completed her master's degree in mass communication from the Queen Mary College.

== Career ==
=== Early work and breakthrough (2012–2015) ===
Ali made her screen debut in 2012 with a supporting role as the younger sister of Sanam Baloch's character in Haissam Hussain's drama Durr-e-Shehwar. She then collaborated with Hussain on two more projects, the romantic drama Aik Nayee Cinderella and the comedy-drama Aunn Zara. The former was Hussain's Pakistani-adaptation of the folk tale Cinderella and starred Ali with Osman Khalid Butt and Faizan Khawaja. Based on Faiza Iftikhar's novel Hisaar-e-Mohabbat, Aunn Zara featured Ali in the title role of Zara, a free-spirited woman.

In 2013, Ali starred in the Fahim Burney's romance Khoya Khoya Chand alongside Ahsan Khan and Sohai Ali Abro. She followed this with her portrayal of a possessive sister in Ranjish Hi Sahi. Ali's third and final project of the year was as an unrequited lover in Amin Iqbal's Meri Zindagi Hai Tu, starring Ayeza Khan.

Ali's first role of 2014 in the family drama Ladoon Mein Pali generally went unnoticed. However, her second release in the social-drama Shanakht proved to be a significant advancement in her career. Ali portrayed Qurratulain, a devout Muslim woman who faces disapproval from her family due to her beliefs. The series was a critical and commercial success. She then reunited with Ahsan Khan to star as a headstrong, protective woman in the drama Zid. Her performance was poorly received; A critic for Dawn found little appeal in Ali's character due to the absence of emotional depth in her portrayal.

In 2015, Ali starred in Mehreen Jabbar's romance-drama Mera Naam Yousuf Hai, which was loosely based on the story "Yusof-o Zulaikhā" by Jami in his book, Haft Awrang. She essayed the role of Zulaikha opposite Imran Abbas. Dawn's Sadaf Siddique was appreciative of Ali's "restrained performance". In her final project of the year, she played an estranged granddaughter in Momina Duraid's family drama, based on Farhat Ishtiaq's novel of the same name, Diyar-e-Dil among an ensemble that included Osman Khalid Butt, Abid Ali and Sanam Saeed. Ali was awarded the Hum Award for Best Actress Popular and earned a nomination of Lux Style Award for Best TV Actress at the 15th Lux Style Awards, her first Lux Style Awards nomination. The series emerged as the highest rated of 2015.

=== Rise to prominence (2016–2019) ===
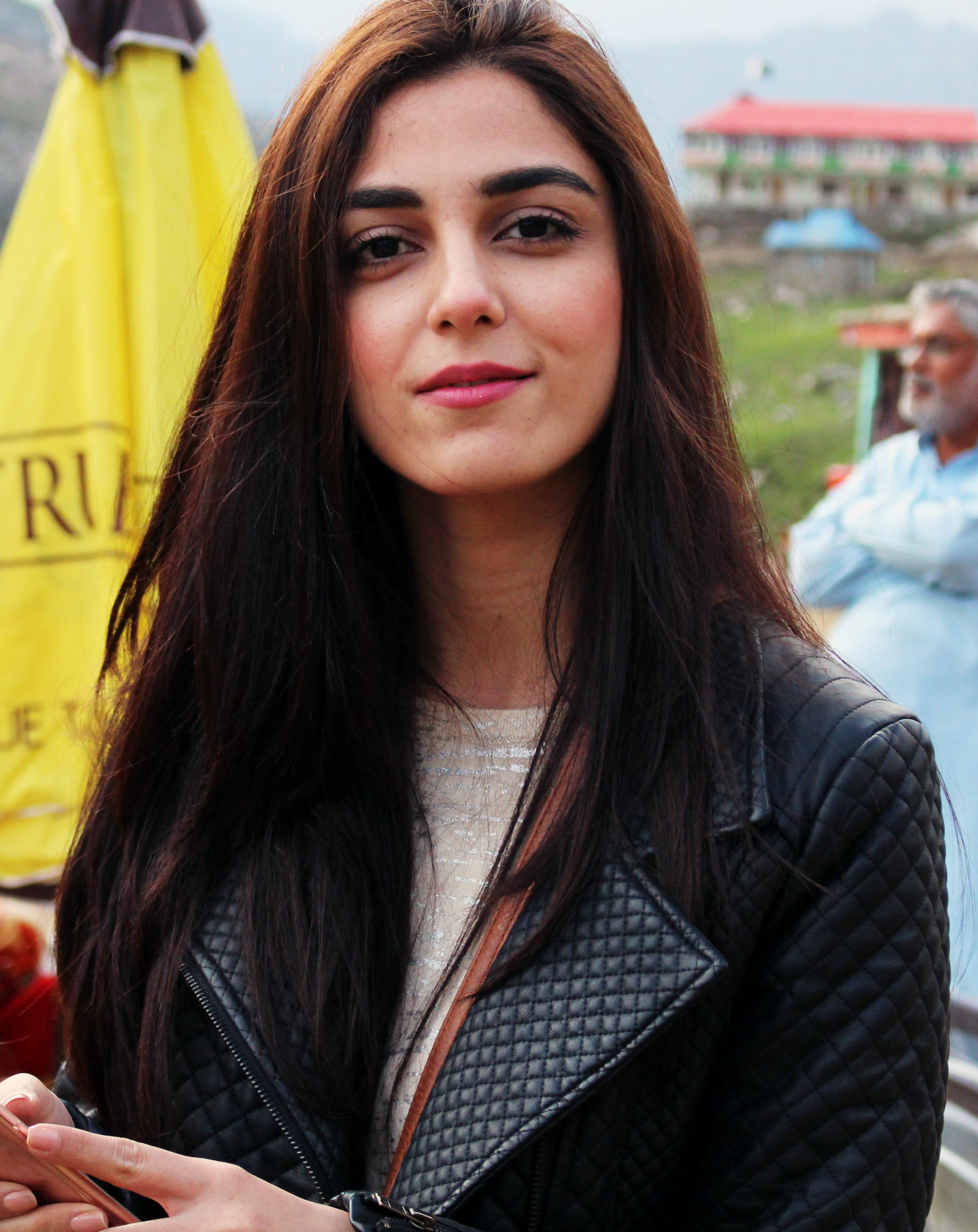
Ali in 2016

In 2016, Ali had her breakthrough role in Mann Mayal opposite Hamza Ali Abbasi. The News International's Aamna Haider Isani found Ali to "go overboard every now and then" but described it as "refreshing" to watch "a female protagonist who is boisterous and lively and unafraid to speak her mind". Regarding criticism of the character's regressive portrayal, Ali defended the role as realistic, arguing that the character conformed due to a lack of support and that her suffering was necessary for her eventual happiness. Despite this, the series emerged as one of the highest rated of all time and Ali earned the Lux Style Award for Best Television Actress at the 16th Lux Style Awards. She then appeared among an ensemble in the romance Sanam, marking her fourth collaboration with Hassan and fourth with Khalid Butt.

In 2018, Ali made her film debut opposite Ali Zafar in Ahsan Rahim's romantic comedy Teefa in Trouble. It received positive reviews from critics, and Ali's performance as a Aliya, a rebellious young woman was generally praised. Omair Alavi of Samaa wrote that Ali came as a "breath of fresh air and looks naturally beautiful", however, added that she "needs to work on her dialogue delivery but here it suited her character", while Daniyal Zahid of The Friday Times opined that, she "adds her bits to those goals by looking particularly stunning". At the time of its release, the film was the most expensive Pakistani film ever made. It went on to become the fifth highest-grossing Pakistani film and Ali's most successful venture despite facing protests due to sexual harassment claims made against Zafar and film piracy following its release. In the following year, Ali had her next release, the romantic comedy Parey Hut Love, directed by Asim Raza. Structured in four segments, the film follows an aspiring actor (played by Sheheryar Munawar) who becomes enamoured with a woman (played by Ali) engaged to someone else. She described the character as her "most powerful yet". The film received divergent reception from critics; While Dawn's Mahnoor Bari criticised Ali's character, finding it "unclear whether Saniya’s character is a case of rushed writing or acting", The Express Tribune lauded her for the way she "handles her character with maturity" and manages to "impress the audience in almost every scene". Parey Hut Love earned over Rs. 300 million (US$1.1 million) to emerge as one of the highest-grossing Pakistani films of all time. She earned two Lux Style Best Actress nominations.

=== Return to televion and career setbacks (2021–present) ===
Following a five-year hiatus, Ali returned to television in 2021 with the romantic drama Pehli Si Muhabbat, marking her second collaboration with Munawar and fifth with Faiza Iftikhar. Directed by Anjum Shahzad, the series received generally positive reviews from critics, however, Ali's performance was panned. Later that year, she starred opposite Wahaj Ali in the historical-drama Jo Bichar Gaye. Set against the backdrop of the Independence of Bangladesh and the subsequent 1971 Indo-Pak War, she portrayed a patriotic Art student. The series earned critical acclaim and Ali was praised for her performance. Sadaf Haider of Dawn praised Ali for "showing us what a good actor can achieve if she is given something more than the one-dimensional bholi larkiyan [innocent girls] our dramas are littered with". Ali's sole performance of 2023 was in the family-drama Yunhi as a Pakistani-American who falls in love with a Pakistani man on her visit to the country. Ali revealed that she chose to star in the series due to director Ehteshamuddin, her co-actor Bilal Ashraf and the script.

In 2024, Ali reunited with Wahaj Ali and Haseeb Hassan for the romance-drama Sunn Mere Dil. Ali next featured opposite Ahad Raza Mir in the romantic drama Aik Mohabbat Aur, as a divorcee assistant commissioner who falls in love with an anchorman. She will next star in the Shoaib Mansoor-helmed film Aasmaan Bolay Ga, opposite Emmad Irfani and will also be seen in the Netflix Original Series Jo Bachay Hain Sang Samait Lo, an adaptation of Farhat Ishtiaq's novel of the same name.

== Other work and media image ==
Mohammad Kamran Jawaid of Dawn noted that Ali has the ability to recognise the quality of a script as well as its box-office potential before accepting a project.

Ali is brand ambassador for Shaukat Khanum Memorial Cancer Hospital and Research Centre and has visited different institutions to raise awareness of breast cancer among young girls. Ali, along with her two cousins, has also launched her own clothing brand, MAYA Pret-A-Porter. She hosted an Eid special show, named Milan, on 7 February 2017. She is also the brand ambassador of Quetta Gladiators in the Pakistan Super League. On 19 April 2017, she and Ali Zafar performed at the 16th Lux Style Awards on Zafar's song "Ishq". Ali walked the ramp of Bridal Week 2018 as showstopper for Nomi Ansari and has been a brand ambassador for him several years after.

She serves as an ambassador for a number of brands and products, such as Lux, QMobile and Sprite. She has appeared as a guest on many television shows, including Sunrise from Istanbul, hosted by Maria Wasti in Turkey, The Afternoon Show with Yasir, Tonite with HSY and With Samina Peerzada. Ali is among the most followed Pakistani actresses on Instagram. In January 2021, the clothing brand Alkaram Studio announced Ali as the next Alkaram Woman for 2021.

== Filmography ==
=== Films ===
Key
†	Denotes films that have not yet been released

Year	Title	Role	Notes	Ref(s)
2018	Teefa in Trouble	Anya	Debut film	
2019	Parey Hut Love	Saniya Faisal		
2026	Khan Tumhara †	Nargis	Post-production	
TBA	Andaaz †	Zeshan Khan's Sister	Pre-production	
TBA	Aaasman Bolay Ga †	TBA	Unreleased	

=== Television ===
Year	Title	Role	Network	Notes	Ref.
2012	Durr-e-Shehwar	Mahnoor Sami	Hum TV	Debut	
2012	Aik Nayee Cinderella	Meesha	Geo Entertainment		
2013	Aunn Zara	Zara	A-Plus TV		
2013	Khoya Khoya Chand	Ahmareen	Hum TV		
2013	Ranjish Hi Sahi	Hiba	Geo Entertainment		
2013	Meri Zindagi Hai Tu	Meenu	Geo Entertainment		
2014	Ladoon Mein Pali	Laraib	Geo Entertainment		
2014	Shanakht	Quratulain	Hum TV		
2014	Zid	Saman	Hum TV		
2015	Mera Naam Yousuf Hai	Zulaikha Noor Muhammad	A-Plus TV		
2015	Diyar-e-Dil	Faarah Wali Khan	Hum TV		
2016	Mann Mayal	Manahil "Mannu" Javed	Hum TV		
2016	Sanam	Aan	Hum TV		
2021	Pehli Si Muhabbat	Darakshan "Rakshi" Faizullah	ARY Digital		
2021	Jo Bichar Gaye	Sonia Anwar	Geo Entertainment		
2023	Yunhi	Kaneez "Kim" Fatima	Hum TV		
2024	Sunn Mere Dil	Sadaf Naamdar	Geo Entertainment		
2026	Aik Mohabbat Aur	Khushbakht Naz	Green Entertainment		

=== Web Series ===
Year	Title	Role	Network	Ref(s)
2026	Jo Bachay Hain Sang Samait Lo †	Rubina Akhtar	Netflix	

== Awards and nominations ==
Year	Award	Category	Title	Results	Ref.
2016	4th Hum Awards	Best Drama Actress - Popular	Diyar-e-Dil	Won	
2016	4th Hum Awards	Best Drama Actress - Jury	Diyar-e-Dil	Nominated	
2016	4th Hum Awards	Best Onscreen Couple - Popular (with Osman Khalid Butt)	Diyar-e-Dil	Nominated	
2016	4th Hum Awards	Best Onscreen Couple - Jury (with Osman Khalid Butt)	Diyar-e-Dil	Won	
2016	IPPA Awards	Best Actress Television	Diyar-e-Dil	Nominated	
2016	15th Lux Style Awards	Best Television Actress	Diyar-e-Dil	Nominated	
2017	16th Lux Style Awards	Best Television Actress	Mann Mayal	Won	
2017	5th Hum Awards	Best Actress - Popular	Mann Mayal	Nominated	
2017	5th Hum Awards	Best Actress - Jury	Mann Mayal	Nominated	
2017	5th Hum Awards	Best On-screen Couple - Popular (with Hamza Ali Abbas)	Mann Mayal	Won	
2017	5th Hum Awards	Best On-screen Couple - Jury (with Hamza Ali Abbas)	Mann Mayal	Nominated	
2017	IPPA Awards	Best Actress Television	Mann Mayal	Nominated	
2019	Pakistan Achievement Awards	Popular Award in Film	Teefa in Trouble	Nominated	
2019	IPPA Awards	Best Film Actress Viewer's Choice	Teefa in Trouble	Won	
2020	19th Lux Style Awards	Best Film Actress	Parey Hut Love	Nominated	
2020	Hum Style Awards	Most Stylish Actor Female	Parey Hut Love	Won	
2022	DIAFA Awards	Pakistani Actress of the Year	—N/a	Won	
2024	9th Hum Awards	Best Actress	Yunhi	Nominated	
2024	9th Hum Awards	Best On-screen Couple (with Bilal Ashraf)	Yunhi	Nominated	
2026	3rd Sunday Special Icon Awards	Fashion Icon of the year	—N/a	Nominated	
