= Balu Mahi =

2016 film by Haissam Hussain

- Urdu: بالو ماہی
- Directed by: Haissam Hussain
- Written by: Saad Azhar
- Produced by: Sadia Jabbar; Chaudry Muhammad Arshad
- Starring: Osman Khalid Butt; Ainy Jaffri; Sadaf Kanwal; Durdana Butt
- Cinematography: Saleem Daad
- Edited by: Rizwan AQ
- Music by: Sahir Ali Bagga
- Production company: Sadia Jabbar Productions
- Distributed by: HKC Entertainment Pakistan; Grand Showbiz Media International
- Release date: 10 February 2017 (Pakistan)
- Running time: 150 min
- Country: Pakistan
- Language: Urdu
- Box office: Rs. 30 million (US$110,000)

Balu Mahi is a 2017 Pakistani romantic comedy film directed by Haissam Hussain, produced by Sadia Jabbar and written by Saad Azhar. A-Plus Films handled distribution of the film in Pakistan, and Grand Showbiz Media handled it internationally.

== Plot ==
The movie begins with Bilal "Balu" (Osman Khalid Butt) gatecrashing a wedding with the goal of preventing it. He mistakenly believes the bride is his former girlfriend, whom he still loves. The plot thickens when he discovers the bride is Mahi (Ainy Jaffri), not his ex, and that she is being forced into an arranged marriage by her family. Mahi sees Balu's gatecrashing as an opportunity to escape the arranged marriage. They are both on the run now. And try as Balu might, Mahi is not leaving him in peace.

== Cast ==
- Osman Khalid Butt as Bilal 'Balu' Malik
- Ainy Jaffri as Mahi Jahangir
- Javed Sheikh as Hasan's father
- Hina Rizvi as Hasan's mother
- Sadaf Kanwal as Sharmeen Mukhtiyar
- Aliee Shaikh as Polo Coach
- Zeeshan Ali
- Durdana Butt
- Shafqat Cheema
- Adeel Hashmi
- Khurram Pataras

== Production ==
The film is directed by Haissam Hussain, written by Saad Azhar and the producers are Sadia Jabbar, Ashraf Chaudry, and Arshad Chaudry. Executive Producer Mian Yousaf Salahuddin HKC Entertainment chairman Hammad Chaudhry, owner of Cinestar in Pakistan, which would distribute the film in Pakistan while Grand Showbiz Media was the International Distributor of the film (they have recently distributed the blockbuster Pakistani Film Actor in Law). Other leading industry names associated with the project include music composer Sahir Ali Bagga, who has composed five songs for the film. Rahat Fateh Ali Khan sung a Qawwali titled "Rang De Chunar" where he makes an exclusive cameo for the film. It starrs Osman Khalid Butt, Ainy Jaffri and Sadaf Kanwal in the lead cast. The soundtrack is composed by Sahir Ali Bagga. The dance in the film is choreographed by Pappu Samrat and Wahab Shah, whilst Saleem Daad served as the Director of Photography (DOP).

=== Filming ===
The shooting of the film began in January 2016. The film was shot in scenic locations of Northern Pakistan.

== Release ==
The film is released in Pakistan on 10 February 2017.

=== Home media ===
World television premier of the movie was held by Geo Entertainment on Eid ul Adha 2018.

=== Digital media ===
The film was released later on Netflix as VOD.

=== Box office ===
The film collected approximately Rs. 25–30 million at the worldwide box office.

=== Critical reception ===
Rafay Mahmood of The Express Tribune rated 3/5 and commented, "Balu Mahi is long but not tiring. Watch it so see Pakistani actors shake a leg in style".

Mehreen Hasan of DAWN Images also rated 3/5 and said, "Balu Mahi is a rom-com with some dark, dramatic moments, but perhaps it's better described and digested as a fantasy film."

Buraq Shabbir of The News praised its cinematography and said, "While the narrative isn't extraordinary or truly original, Balu Mahi has a comedic undertone that keeps the viewer intrigued throughout."

Shahjehan Saleem of Something Haute gave it 3 out 5 stars and said, "the film ends up confused between what it wants in a lot of places, where forced drama, equally confusing moments of conflict, and dance sequences come in."

Mehar Khursheed of Newsline commented, "The movie has several moments of hilarity and the acting is more than adequate, worth watching for pure entertainment value."

Hamza Shafique of Dubai Desi Reviews gave film 1.5 out of 5 desi stars and commented, "Balu Mahi feels like a teen YouTuber's halfhearted attempt to create a parody of Jab We Met and Dil Bole Haddipa."

=== Accolades ===
Ceremony	Won	Nominated
17th Lux Style Awards		Best Film; Osman Khalid Butt – Best Actor; Ainy Jaffri – Best Actress; Haissam Hussain – Best Director; Durdana Butt – Best Supporting Actress; Sadaf Kanwal – Best Supporting Actress
4th Galaxy Lollywood Awards	Wahab Shah – Best Choreography for "Balu Mahi"	Best Film; Ainy Jaffri – Best Actor in a Leading Role Female; Haissam Hussain – Best Director; Sadaf Kanwal – Best Performance in a Comic Role; Osman Khalid Butt – Best Male Debut; Sahir Ali Bagga – Best Playback Singer Male for "Tu Kia Janey"; Sahir Ali Bagga – Best Music; Osman Khalid Butt and Ainy Jaffri – Best Dance Performance for "Balu Mahi"; Hina Rizvi – Best Special Appearance; Osman Khalid Butt and Ainy Jaffri – Best On-Screen Couple for "Balu Mahi"

== Soundtrack ==
All music is composed by Sahir Ali Bagga.

No.	Song	Singers
01	"Rang De Chunar"	Rahat Fateh Ali Khan and Nazish Parvez
02	"Balu Mahi"	Asim Azhar and Aima Baig
03	"Bechaniyaan"	Sahir Ali Bagga and Afshan Fawad
04	"Tu Kya Jaane"	Sahir Ali Bagga

== See also ==
- Bin Roye
- Akbari Asghari
- List of Pakistani films of 2017
