= Tajdeed e Wafa =

Pakistani television series

- Original title: ur
- Genre: Romantic drama; Serial drama; Teen drama
- Based on: Tajdeed E Wafa by Sonia Naveed
- Written by: Samira Fazal
- Directed by: Ilyas Kashmiri
- Starring: Ainy Jaffri; Ahmed Ali; Naveen Waqar; Haroon Shahid
- Country of origin: Pakistan
- Original language: Urdu
- No. of seasons: 1
- No. of episodes: 30

Production
- Producer: Momina Duraid
- Production location: Pakistan
- Camera setup: Multi-camera setup
- Production company: MD Productions

Original release
- Network: Hum TV
- Release: 24 September 2018 – 10 April 2019

Tajdeed-e-Wafa (Urdu: تجدیدِ وفا, lit. 'Renewal of Loyalty') was a Pakistani drama produced by Momina Duraid under their banner MD Productions. It was directed by Ilyas Kashmiri, written by Samira Fazal, and starred Ainy Jaffry, Ahmed Ali, Naveen Waqar, and Haroon Shahid.

== Cast ==
- Ainy Jaffri as Hareem Arsal.
- Ahmed Ali Akbar as Arsal, Ashar's younger brother.
- Naveen Waqar as Neha Ashar; Ashar's wife.
- Haroon Shahid as Ashar, elder brother of Arsal
- Shamil Khan as young (Abid Ali).
- Tahira Imam as mother of Arsal and Ashar.
- Laila Zuberi as Sheeba Jamal, Hareem's mother.
- Nargis Rasheed as Arsal's Aunt, Warisha's Stepmother.
- Areej Mohyudin as Warisha
- Abid Ali as father of Arsal and Ashar.
- Humayun Gul as Hareem's father.

== Soundtrack ==
Tajdeed e Wafa - OST

Soundtrack album by Amanat Ali & Dania Farooq
- Released: 1 October 2018
- Recorded: 2018
- Genre: Television soundtrack
- Length: (1:34)
- Language: Urdu
- Label: Hum TV

Music video
- "Tajdeed e Wafa" OST on YouTube

The title song was sung by Amanat Ali & Dania Farooq. The music was composed by Naveed Nashad and the lyrics were written by Imran Raza.

== Production ==
The filming for the series took place in Islamabad in 2018.
