= Ainy Jaffri =

Pakistani actress

Ainy Jaffri Rahman
- عینی جعفری رحمان
- Born: Ainy Jaffri
- Occupation: Actress, model
- Years active: 2010–present
- Spouse: Faris Rahman (m. 2014)

Ainy Jaffri Rahman (Urdu: عینی جعفری) is a Pakistani actress and model.

== Career ==
Ainy initially started her career at an advertising company. Later on when she came to Pakistan she started working in drama serials.

She made her television debut with AAG TV's teen drama, Dreamers . She then followed it with the drama serial Zip Bus Chup Raho in 2011, which was telecast on Geo TV. In 2012, Jaffri appeared in a lead role in Hum TV's program Aseerzadi. In 2013, she made her film debut in Humayun Saeed's production Main Hoon Shahid Afridi. Ainy Jaffri has also voiced the main character Jiya in the animated series, Burka Avenger. She also appeared in the 2017 film Balu Mahi with Osman Khalid Butt, a film by Haissam Hussain. In 2018, she appeared in the drama serial Tajdeed e Wafa on Hum TV.

In October 2022, it was announced that she will make her television comeback after a four-year hiatus, with her role in an upcoming web series Mandi.

== Personal life ==
Jaffri married Faris Rahman on 22 February 2014.

== Filmography ==
=== Drama serials ===
Year	Drama Serial	Network	Role	Ref
2010	Dreamers	AAG TV	Maya	
2011	Zip Bus Chup Raho	Geo Entertainment	Tabby	
2011	Meri Behan Maya	Geo Entertainment	Maya	
2011	Badtameez		Mariam	
2013	Aseerzadi	Hum TV	Mahira	
2013	Burka Avenger	Geo TezNickelodeon Pakistan	Jiya	
2016	Sila	Hum TV	Mariam	
2018	Azaab-e-Zindagi		Meera	
2018	Tajdeed e Wafa	Hum TV	Hareem	
2023	Mandi	ZEE5		

=== Films ===
Key
†	Denotes films that have not yet released

Year	Title	Role	Notes	ref
2013	Main Hoon Shahid Afridi	Alina	Debut film	
2017	Balu Mahi	Mahi		

== See also ==
- List of Pakistani actresses
