= Ranjish Hi Sahi =

Single by Mehdi Hassan
- Genre: Ghazal
- Songwriter: Ahmed Faraz

Ranjish Hi Sahi (Urdu: رنجش ہی سہی, lit. 'Even If In Resentment') is a popular Urdu ghazal. Written by Ahmed Faraz, it was first sung by Iqbal Bano and popularized by Mehdi Hassan.

== Lyrics ==
رنجش ہی سہی دل ہی دکھانے کے لیے آ
آ پھر سے مجھے چھوڑ کے جانے کے لیے آ
پہلے سے مراسم نہ سہی پھر بھی کبھی تو
رسم و رہِ دنیا ہی نبھانے کے لیے آ
کس کس کو بتائیں گے جدائی کا سبب ہم
تو مجھ سے خفا ہے تو زمانے کے لیے آ
کچھ تو مرے پندار محبت کا بھرم رکھ
تو بھی تو کبھی مجھ کو منانے کے لیے آ
اک عمر سے ہوں لذتِ گریہ سے بھی محروم
اے راحتِ جاں مجھ کو رلانے کے لیے آ
اب تک دل خوش فہم کو ہیں تجھ سے امیدیں
یہ آخری شمعیں بھی بجھانے کے لیے آ

=== Translation ===
If it is grief so be it, come to break my heart again.

Do come, if only for the act of leaving me again.

Our relationship may not be the same as before, but even if seldom.

Come to fulfill the rituals and traditions of the world.

To whom all must I explain the reason of separation.

Come, if you are displeased with me, for the sake of the world.

Respect a little the depth of my love for you.

Come someday to placate me as well.

It has been a long time I haven't had the luxury of grieving.

My peace-of-mind please do come back if only to make me cry.

Till now my hopeful heart is keeping some expectations from you.

But at least come back to put off these last candles of hope.
