= Osman Khalid Butt =

Pakistani actor and director

- عثمان خالد بٹ
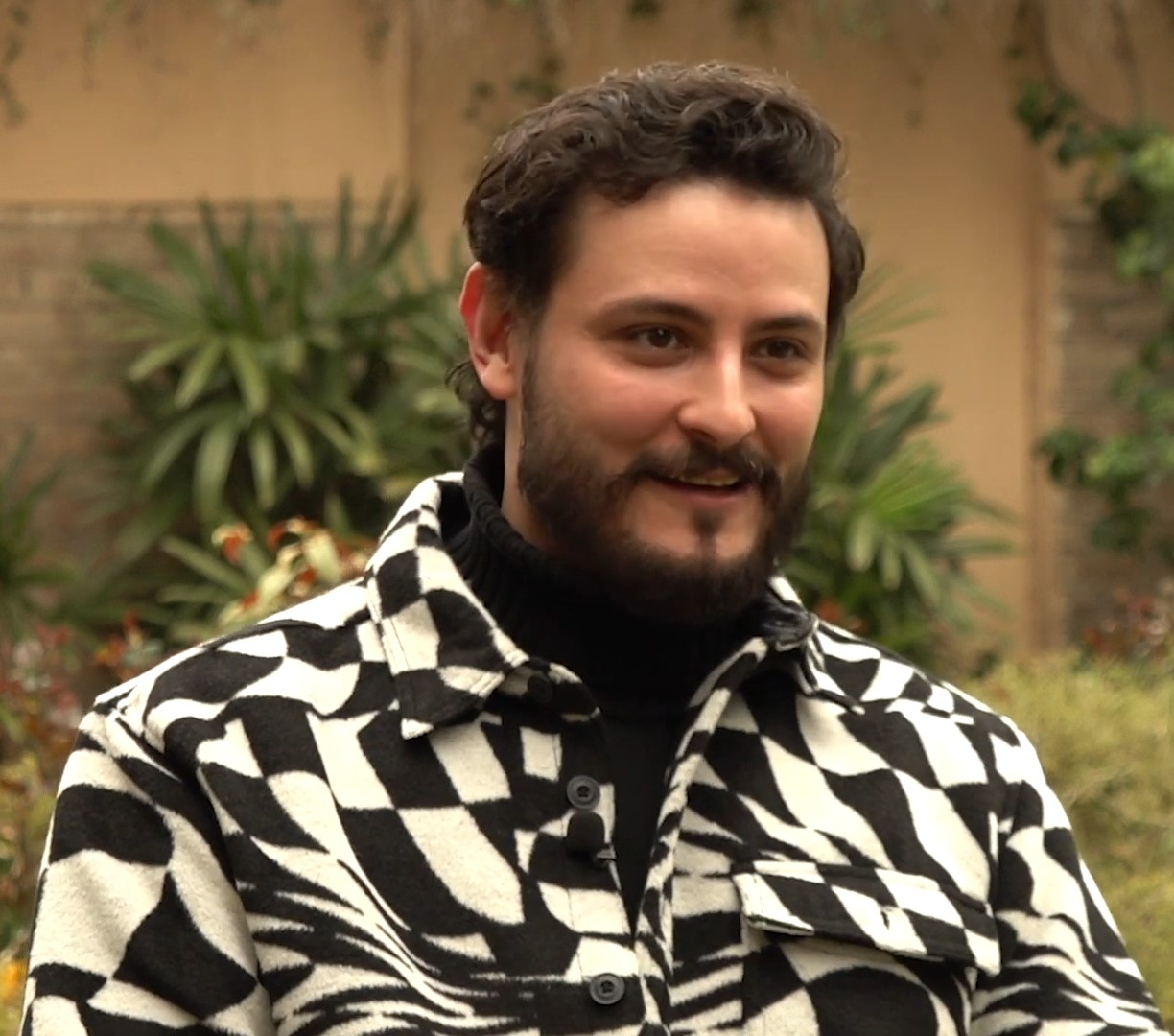
- Osman in 2024
- Born: Islamabad, Pakistan
- Occupations: Actor, writer
- Years active: 2005–present

Osman Khalid Butt (Urdu: عثمان خالد بٹ) is a Pakistani film, television and theatre actor, writer and choreographer. He is best known for his role as Wali Sohaib Khan in Diyar-e-Dil (2015), Faaz Ibrahim in Chupke Chupke (2021) and Malik Shahzain in Ehd-e-Wafa (2019). He is the recipient of several accolades, including two Hum Awards, an ARY Film Award, and has twice been nominated for a Lux Style Award.

Butt was first recognised for his leading roles in the fantasy romantic series Aik Nayee Cinderella (2012) and the popular comedy Aunn Zara (2013). His other notable work includes the acclaimed television series Baaghi (2017), which ranks among the highest-rated Pakistani dramas, the blockbuster romantic comedy film Balu Mahi (2017), and the drama film Baaji (2019). Butt has written screenplays for the horror thriller Siyaah (2013), and the romantic comedies Janaan (2016) and Parchi (2018).

== Personal life ==
Butt's father, Dr. Khalid Said Butt, is an actor, director and screenwriter in Pakistan. According to him, when he was just 5 years old, his elder sister asked him to look at the stars in the sky and craft stories, which then developed into his love for acting and screenwriting. His brother, Omar Khalid Butt, is a news anchor and writer, and his sister, Michelle Tania Butt, is the chief executive of Kuch Khaas.

== Career ==
Butt started his acting career in 2005, acting in theatre plays in his hometown Islamabad. He made his film debut in the 2007 film Zibahkhana which is Pakistan's first zombie horror film. In 2007 he also wrote, acted, choreographed for, and directed his first theatre production under the banner of 'The Living Picture Productions' the company he set up around the same time. He went onto write direct and act in many successful plays in his home town. In 2010 he started making videos on YouTube as "The living picture guy" then acted in the film Slackistan which was banned after the film was refused a pass by the censor board. In 2012 he acted in the romantic drama series Aik Nayee Cinderella. The same year he starred as Aunn in Aunn Zara. He was also featured in a drama Munkir as Zain. In 2015, he played the role of Wali Suhaib Khan in Diyar-e-Dil. In 2016, he played the role of Harib in Sanam.

Butt is the co-founder, creative lead and poetry editor of the Desi Writers Lounge, an online, 24/7, 365 days a year writers' workshop and community, that aims to showcase new voices in South Asian writing through their biannual publication, 'Papercuts'. He has written the screen play for the 2013 acclaimed supernatural horror film Siyaah and the 2016 commercially successful romantic comedy film Janaan. He is also the script-writer of lux style awards 2017. He then featured as Balu in his debut film as an actor, the comedy Balu Mahi along with Ainy Jaffri. He was the director of choreography in the film Parchi (2018) for the song "Billo Hai".

== Filmography ==
=== Film ===
| Year | Film | Role | Actor | Writer | Choreographer | Lyricist | Notes |
|---|---|---|---|---|---|---|---|
| 2007 | Zibahkhana | O.J | Yes | No | No | No | |
| 2010 | Slackistan | Saad | Yes | No | No | No | |
| 2013 | Siyaah | | No | Yes | No | No | |
| 2016 | Janaan | | No | Yes | No | No | Cameo appearance |
| 2017 | Balu Mahi | Bilal | Yes | No | No | No | Nominated—Lux Style Award for Best Film Actor |
| 2018 | Parchi | | No | No | Yes | No | Choreographer for the song "Billo Hai" |
| 2019 | Laal Kabootar | | No | No | No | Yes | |
| 2019 | Baaji | Rohail Khan | Yes | No | Yes | Yes | |
| 2019 | Heer Maan Ja | | No | No | Yes | No | |
| 2019 | Superstar | Osman | Yes | No | No | No | Special appearance in the song "Noori" |

=== Television ===
| Year | Serial | Role | Notes |
|---|---|---|---|
| 2012 | Durr-e-Shehwar | Hassan | Recurring role |
| 2012 | Aik Nayee Cinderella | Mayer | |
| 2013 | Aunn Zara | Aunn | |
| 2013 | Galti se Mistake Hogayi | Waheed Murad | |
| 2014 | Goya | Omar Hashim | |
| 2015 | Diyar-e-Dil | Wali Suhaib Khan | Nominated—Lux Style Award for Best Television Actor |
| 2016 | Sanam | Harib | |
| 2017 | Munkir | Zayn al-Abedin Khan | |
| 2017 | Baaghi | Shahryar | |
| 2019-20 | Surkh Chandni | Amaan | |
| 2019-20 | Ehd-e-Wafa | Malik Shahzain | |
| 2019-20 | Alif | Faysal | Cameo appearance |
| 2021 | Chupke Chupke | Faaz Ibrahim | |
| 2021 | Qatil Haseenaon Ke Naam | Aftab | Web series; Released on ZEE5 |
| 2022 | Kaala Doriya | Asfand | |
| 2023 | Siyaah | Nabeel Usman | Episodes "Lutrum Putrum" |

== Awards and nominations ==
| Year | Award | Category | Work | Result |
|---|---|---|---|---|
| 2014 | Pakistan Media Awards | Best Drama Artist (Male) | Aunn Zara | Nominated |
| 2014 | ARY Film Awards | Best Screenplay | Siyaah | Won |
| 2016 | 15th Lux Style Awards | Best TV Actor | Diyar-e-Dil | Nominated |
| 2016 | 4th Hum Awards | Best Actor (Popular) | Diyar-e-Dil | Won |
| 2016 | 4th Hum Awards | Best Actor (Jury) | Diyar-e-Dil | Nominated |
| 2016 | 4th Hum Awards | Best Onscreen Couple (Popular) Shared with Maya Ali | Diyar-e-Dil | Nominated |
| 2016 | 4th Hum Awards | Best Onscreen Couple (Jury) Shared with Maya Ali | Diyar-e-Dil | Won |
| 2017 | 5th Hum Awards | Best Actor Drama Popular (Jury) | Sanam | Nominated |
| 2017 | 16th Lux Style Awards | Best Actor in a Film | Balu Mahi | Nominated |
| 2017 | Hum Style Awards | Most Stylish Actor (Film) | Balu Mahi | Won |
| 2018 | IPPA Awards | Best Actor (Drama) | Baaghi | Nominated |
| 2018 | IPPA Awards | Best Actor (Film) | Balu Mahi | Nominated |
| 2018 | IPPA Awards | Jodi of the Year (Film) Shared with Ainy Jaffri | Balu Mahi | Won |
| 2018 | Masala Awards | Agent of Social Change | —N/a | Honored |
