= Dayar-e-Dil (novella) =

2010 novella by Farhat Ishtiaq

- Author: Farhat Ishtiaq
- Language: Urdu
- Series: Mere Humdum Mere Dost
- Genre: Drama, Romance
- Publisher: Ilm-O-Irfan Publications
- Publication date: July 2010
- Publication place: Pakistan
- Media type: Print (Hardcover, Paperback)
- Pages: 308

Dayar-e-Dil (Urdu: دیار دل ; English: The Valley of Heart) is a novella by Pakistani fiction writer Farhat Ishtiaq, published in 2010.

Dayar-e-Dil was first published in Shuaa Digest, a monthly Urdu-language magazine, as a story in its complete novel section, followed by Mere Humdum Mere Dost. In 2010, both stories was compiled in a book of the same name of a former story (English: My life partner, My friend) by Ilm-o-Irfan Publications.

== Plot summary ==
Farah is a young doctor doing her house job. Her mother Ruhina, has left for Karachi after their dispute over the property, which Ruhina wants to demand from her father-in-law after Farah's divorce from Wali, but Farah is reluctant to take the property. For fifteen days, she spared herself from the outer world, when one day Wali calls her and tells her that he has agreed to give her a divorce, including whatever else she wants, also to let her marry her cousin Moeez, and they decide to meet. Farah then meets Wali, who proposes a contract and says that if she agrees to live in Peshawar with Agha Jan for three months, he will give her a divorce, including the property she is demanding and whatever else she wants. Despite being alarmed, she reluctantly agrees and signs the contract, without telling anyone, and she and Wali leave for Peshawar, where ailing Agha Jaan becomes energetic after seeing her. Unable to understand, she concludes that Wali brought her here because of the declining health of her Grandfather. However, she decides to fulfill the contract, and gradually she discovers many truths about their lives and families. After meeting Agha Jan, Farah enters her father's room, where she remembers all the past events that had occurred.

It is then revealed that, Bakhtiyar Khan was a landlord and had two sons Behroze and Suhaib. Behroze was engaged to his uncle's daughter Amina from childhood, and both were to be married at a proper age. But, things changed when Behroze refused to marry his cousin, because he loved Ruhina, his classmate. Agha Jan furiously rejected his proposal and ordered him to leave the house. Agha Jaan decided that Suhaib will marry his niece Amina, unable to resist Suhaib agrees. After that, Behroze married Ruhina, and both have a daughter Farah, while Suhaib has two children Wali and Zarmeen. Suhaib tried every way to reunite Behroze with family, but all went in vain. Suhaib wanted his son Wali to marry Behroze's daughter Farah, in order to reunite the family. After eighteen years, Behroze learns of his brother's death, he decides to return to Peshawar and agrees to fulfill his brother's last wish, Ruhina opposed the decision as both of them are children and the two have a dispute for the first time in life. despite Ruhina's reservations Farah marries Wali, they return to Lahore in order to return forever, Ruhina left and went to her brother’s house, Behroze suddenly dies. This shocked Ruhina to an extent that his sorrow became hate for Agha Jaan, she instantly asks for the divorce of her daughter and demands property for Farah. However, Agha Jaan refused, and decided that Farah should continue her studies as her father’s wish was to make her a doctor. Ruhina blames Farah and Agha Jaan for spoiling her life, due to continuous depression and Ruhina's behavior Farah started to blame Wali and hated her as she thought he is not ready to give her the divorce. Agha Jaan tries to reconnect with them and asked for Rukhsati, but Ruhina demanded a divorce which Farah also wants but when Ruhina asked for a share in property on the suggestion of her brother and niece, Farah became angry as she does not want any property. Farah herself asks for a divorce in front of Agha Jaan and Wali, which chokes Agha Jaan, unable to bear this confession Agha Jaan has a heart attack for the second time, which makes him more ill and lean. Ruhina who thinks that her daughter is not taking her side, leaves her and goes to Canada to her sister.

In the present, Agha Jaan tells her how much he loves her and he is shameful for not accepting Ruhina as her daughter-in-law and now wants to make everything right. Farah continues to develop a soft corner and affection for Agha Jan as she realizes that he is a changed man and whatever her mother thinks is not right. She tries to contact her mother but she refuses to talk to her. Zarmeen who is taking care of Agha Jan also hates Farah as she thinks that Agha Jaan has to bear all the problems because of her, he remains restraint from her. One day Agha Jaan takes her to a newly built portion of the house where he reveals that he made this for them, Agha Jaan then tearfully confesses his mistakes and apologizes to Farah for creating a stir in their lives, this depression gives Agha Jan another heart attack, she runs for help, Wali, Zarmeen tries to revive Agha Jaan, but he doesn't respond. Zarmeen yelled at Farah and blames her for Agha Jaan's condition. Farah insists to stay with Agha Jaan, she witnesses Wali praying and crying and for the first time she pays attention to him, she sits down near him in the corridor and starts crying for her misbehavior and all the problems that she has created. Farah decides to amend and reunite the family with her whole heart, she patches up with Zarmeen and develops a strong love for Wali, meanwhile she destroys the contract.

Farah calls her mother for one last time, she tells her how they were wrong about their family, how her father died, how things could have been and makes her realize that they both did a mistake in understanding Agha Jaan and Wali. A few days later, Moeez goes to Peshawar and asks her to return, as he thinks that Wali is forcing her to stay. But she refuses to go with him and ask that she was wrong about her grandfather and Wali, and tells him that she will continue her marriage with Wali, with her will. She apologizes to Wali and ask him that it was not her who was demanding the property and now she doesn't want a divorce as Agha Jaan will not bear another stress, But Wali explains her that Agha Jaan has already said that it is up to her to make whatever decision she wants, and that it will be accepted. He also said that he wants to marry a girl who loves him and wants to stay with him, not because of someone else happiness but her own. He tells her that he didn't hate her or considered responsible for all this, but blames her that she didn't know what she actually wants. Meanwhile Ruhina, realizes her mistake and calls Agha Jaan and tearfully confesses her mistakes and promises Agha Jan to come to him forever. Farah's anxiousness increases as three months have come to an end, on the last day she goes to her portion and sits there for a long time and cries as she thinks that he does not love her. While returning to her room she mistakenly goes to Wali's room and sleeps there. In the morning Wali wakes her up, and gives her some paper which she angrily tears, and tell him that she doesn't want a divorce, she wanted to stay with him because she loves him. Wali then reveals that he already knows that she was in love with him, he just wanted to her to confess herself, he also confesses that he once hated her but now he has also fallen in love with her.

== Publication ==
Dayar-e-Dil was first published in "Shuaa Digest" as a story in "complete Novel" section, followed by Mere Humdam Mere Dost. In 2010, both stories were compiled in a book of the same name of a former story (English: My life partner, My friend) by Ilm-o-Irfan publications.

== Television adaptation ==
In 2015, a television adaptation was made by Hum TV in collaboration with channels own production house MD Productions. It stars Mikaal Zulfiqar as Behroze, Sanam Saeed as Ruhina, Maya Ali as Farah, Osman Khalid Butt as Wali, Ali Rehman Khan as Suhaib and Abid Ali as Agha Jan.
