= Bahar =

Bahar may refer to:

== Places ==
=== Armenia ===
- Bahar, the former name of Arpunk, a village in the Gegharkunik Province of Armenia
- Bahar, the former name of Kakhakn, a town in the Gegharkunik Province of Armenia

=== Northeast Africa ===
- Bahir Dar or Bahar Dar, capital city of Amhara Region in Ethiopia
- Northern Red Sea Region, in Eritrea
- Southern Red Sea Region, in Eritrea
- Medri Bahri, a medieval kingdom in the Horn of Africa
- Red Sea (state), a state in Sudan
- Red Sea Governorate, a governorate in Egypt

=== Iran ===
- Bahar, Iran, a city in Hamadan Province of Iran
- Bahar County, an administrative subdivision of Hamadan Province
- Bahar, Khuzestan, a village in Khuzestan Province, Iran
- Bahar, Markazi, a village in Markazi Province, Iran
- Bahar, North Khorasan, a village in North Khorasan Province, Iran
- Bahar, Razavi Khorasan, a village in Razavi Khorasan Province, Iran
- Bahar, Tehran, an area of central Tehran, Iran
- Bahar-e Olya, a village in North Khorasan Province, Iran
- Bahar-e Sofla, a village in North Khorasan Province, Iran
- Central District (Bahar County), a district in Bahar County, Hamadan Province, Iran
- Central District (Chabahar County), a district in Chah Bahar County, Sistan and Baluchestan Province, Iran
- Chah Bahar, a city in and capital of Chah Bahar County, Sistan and Baluchestan Province, Iran
- Chah Bahar County, a county in Sistan and Baluchestan Province, Iran

=== Malta ===
- Baħar iċ-Ċagħaq, a village in Malta

== Media ==
- Bahar (newspaper), a Persian-language newspaper
- Bahar (magazine), a 1910 Persian-language magazine
- Bahar (raga), a Hindustani classical raga
- Bahar (film), 1951 Indian film
- Bahar, the protagonist of the 2018 film Girls of the Sun
- Bahar (TV series), 2024 Turkish TV series

== Other uses ==
- Bahar (name)
- Bahar (drink), a type of palm wine from Sabah, Malaysia
- Bahar (unit), an obsolete unit of length in Iran, and unit of mass in Oman
- Bahar Azadi Coin, an Iranian gold coin minted by Central Bank of the Republic of Iran
- Bahir Negus or Bahri Negus, the title of the ruler or king of Medri Bahri, an Eritrean kingdom from 1137 to 1879
- Red Sea University, a university in Port Sudan, Red Sea State, Sudan
- Zobe-Felezat Bahar Hamedan F.C., an Iranian football club based in Hamedan, Iran

== See also ==
- Behar (disambiguation)
- Baharon (disambiguation)
- Bahara (disambiguation)
- Baharan (disambiguation)
- Baharak (disambiguation)
- Bahari (disambiguation)
- Cooch Behar (disambiguation), also Kuch Bahar, city in India
