= List of Pakistani films of 2012 =

List of Pakistani films by year 2012

== Top Grossing Films ==
The top films released in 2012 by worldwide gross are as follows:

Rank	Title	Studio	Gross
1.	Shareeka	Paragon Entertainment	Rs. 1.50 crore (US$52,000)
2.	Gol Chakkar	InCahoot Films	Rs. 1.00 crore (US$35,000)

== Releases ==
=== March – May ===
Opening		Title	Genre	Director	Cast	Ref.
M A R	30	Lahoria	Action	Malik Imdad Hussain	Zafri Khan, Saima Malik, Nadia Ali, Shabbir Khan, Majeed Zarif	

Opening		Title	Genre	Director	Cast	Ref.
A P R	13	Achha Gujjar	Action	Masood Butt	Saima Noor, Shaan Shahid, Dua Qureshi, Nawaz Khan, Shafqat Cheema	

=== June – August ===
Opening		Title	Genre	Director	Cast	Ref.
J U L	4	Malang Badshah	Action	Arshad Khan	Nargis, Shaan Shahid Shahid Khan, Jahangir Khan, Shafqat Cheema	
J U L	4	Inteqam	Action	Ajab Gul	Ajab Gul, Asima Lata, Shahid Khan, Dua Qureshi, Jahangir Khan	
A U G	20	Shareeka	Action, Drama	Syed Noor	Saima, Shaan Shahid, Bahar Begum, Mustafa Qureshi, Irfan Khoosat, Naghma, Afzaal Ahmed	

=== Sept – November ===
Opening		Title	Genre	Director	Cast	Ref.
O C T	27	Sher Dil	Action, Drama	Iqbal Kashmiri	Shaan Shahid, Saima Noor, Sila Hussein, Zeeshan Sikandar, Shafqat Cheema	
O C T	27	Charsi	Action	Arshad Khan	Shahid Khan, Laila, Asima Lata, Babrak Shah, Jahangir Khan	
O C T	30	Gol Chakkar	Comedy, Drama	Shahbaz Shigri & Aisha Linnea	Ali Rehman Khan, Hasan Bruun Akhtar, Usman Mukhtar, Uzair Jaswal	

== See also ==
- 2012 in film
- 2012 in Pakistan
