= Shahbaz Shigri =

Pakistani model, actor

- شہباز شگری
- Born: Shahbaz Hamid Shigri; 24 February 1988 (age 38); Islamabad, Pakistan
- Occupations: Model; actor; director
- Years active: 2010–present
- Spouse: Aisha Linnea Akhtar (m. 2012; div. 2018)

Shahbaz Hamid Shigri (born 24 February 1988) is a Pakistani model, actor, director and producer. He has appeared in various films and is best known for playing the lead role of Hasan in Slackistan (2010) and a supporting role in Asim Raza's Parey Hut Love (2019).

He was nominated for the Best Music Video Director award at the 14th Lux Style Awards for directing the video for Adil Omar's "Exploding Heart".

== Personal life ==
Shigri started dating his Slackistan co-star, Aisha Linnea Akhtar, in May 2009, during the film's post-production phase. They married in March 2012, but divorced in June 2018.

In 2019, Shigri started dating singer Aima Baig. The couple got engaged in July 2021. In September 2022, Baig confirmed they had broken up on Instagram.

== Filmography ==
Year	Title	Role	Notes
2010	Slackistan	Hasan	
2011	Sole Search		Short film
2012	Gol Chakkar	—	Director only
2013	Anima State		Cinematographer
2017	Verna	–	Assistant director only
2019	Parey Hut Love	Hasan	

== Television ==
Year	Title	Role	Notes
2020	Qurbatain	Faaris	Television debut
2024	Gissa e Dil	Haroon	
