= Bahar (name) =

Bahar (Persian: بهار, lit. 'spring') in Persian appears as a feminine given name in Iran, Afghanistan, and Turkey. It comes from the Middle Persian whʾl (wahār), which ultimately comes from Proto-Indo-European *wósr̥ (“spring”).

A similar name also appears in the Semitic languages albeit with a different meaning. Therefore, Baħar in Maltese; Al-Bahr (Arabic: البحر, romanized: albahr) in Arabic; and Bahir (Amharic: ባሕር, romanized: baḥiri in Amharic - Bahari / Tigrinya: ባሕሪ, romanized: Bahri in Tigrinya).

== People with the given name Bahar ==
- Emine Gülbahar Hatun (died 1492), concubine of Ottoman Sultan Mehmed II and mother of Bayezid II
- Bahar Akbay (born 1998), Turkish volleyball player
- Bahar Çağlar (born 1988), Turkish basketballer
- Bahar Davary, Iranian-American religious studies scholar
- Bahar Doğan (born 1974), Turkish long-distance runner
- Bahar Güvenç (born 1997), Turkish footballer
- Bahar Kizil (born 1988), German singer of Turkish descent
- Bahar Mert (born 1975), Turkish volleyball player
- Bahar Movahed Bashiri (born 1979), Iranian portrait caricaturist, classical vocalist and dentist
- Bahar Soomekh (born 1975), Iranian-American actor
- Bahar Toksoy (born 1988), Turkish volleyball player
- Bahar Jefri Bolkiah (born 1981), Bruneian prince
- Bahar Yıldırım (born 1998), Turkish long-distance runner

== People with the surname Bahar ==
- Ahmad Bahar (1889–1957), Iranian statesman
- Ahmad Bahar (Palestinian politician) (1949–2023), Palestinian politician
- Hassan Bahara (born 1978), Moroccan-Dutch writer
- Dany Bahar (born 1971), Turkish chief executive
- Emran bin Bahar (born 1961), Bruneian diplomat
- Hatice Bahar Özgüvenç (born 1984), Turkish footballer
- Mehrdad Bahar (1930–1994), Iranian linguist, mythologist and Persian historian
- Mohammad-Taqi Bahar (1884–1951), Iranian poet, politician, historian and journalist
- Mojdeh Bahar, American patent attorney and government official
- R. Iris Bahar, American professor and electronics engineer
- Salah Al Bahar (born 1970), Iraqi singer and composer
- Qazi Mu'tasim Billah Bahar (1933–2013), Bangladeshi Islamic scholar and professor

== See also ==
- Bahar (disambiguation)
