= Bahar, Armenia =

Bahar, Armenia may refer to:

- Arpunk, Armenia - formerly Bahar
- Kakhakn, Armenia - formerly Bahar
