= Bahara =

Bahara may refer to:

- Bahara, Uttar Pradesh, India
- Bahara, Iran
- "Bahara" (song), from the 2010 Hindi film I Hate Luv Storys

== See also ==
- Bahar (disambiguation)
- Baharan (disambiguation)
