= Baharon =

Baharon may refer to:

- Aashiq Hoon Baharon Ka, a 1977 Indian Hindi-language romance film drama by J. Om Prakash
- Baharon Ke Sapne, a 1967 Indian film under the Nasir Hussain films banner
- Baharon Ki Manzil (disambiguation)
  - Baharon Ki Manzil (1968 film), a 1968 Indian Hindi-language film by Yakub Hassan Rizvi
  - Baharon Ki Manzil (1973 film), a 1973 Pakistani film directed by S. Suleman
- Baharon Phool Barsao, a 1972 Bollywood romance film
- "Baharon Phool Barsao" (song), a 1966 song by Mohammed Rafi

== See also ==
- Bahar (disambiguation)
