= Ek Paheli Leela (soundtrack) =

2015 soundtrack album

Soundtrack album by Dr. Zeus, Amaal Mallik, Meet Bros Anjjan, Tony Kakkar and Uzair Jaswal
- Released: 10 March 2015
- Recorded: Meet Bros Recording Studio
- Genre: Feature film soundtrack
- Length: 39:54
- Label: T-Series

Singles from Ek Paheli Leela
- 1. "Desi Look" Released: 19 February 2015; 2. "Tere Bin Nahi Laage (Male)" Released: 27 February 2015; 3. "Saiyaan Superstar" Released: 5 March 2015

Ek Paheli Leela is the soundtrack album to the 2015 film of the same name directed by Bobby Khan starring Sunny Leone. The soundtrack featured nine songs composed by Dr. Zeus, Amaal Mallik, Meet Bros Anjjan, Tony Kakkar and Uzair Jaswal, with lyrics written by Kumaar, Manoj Muntashir and Kakkar. The album was released under the T-Series label on 10 March 2015.

== Background ==
The film score was composed by Mannan Munjal, whereas the songs featured in the film were composed by Dr. Zeus, Amaal Mallik, Meet Bros Anjjan, Tony Kakkar and Uzair Jaswal, and lyrics written by Kumaar, Manoj Muntashir and Tony Kakkar. Ensemble singers like Tulsi Kumar, Arijit Singh, Kanika Kapoor, Monali Thakur, Meet Bros Anjjan, Mohit Chauhan, Neha Kakkar, Krishna Beura, Neha Kakkar, Aishwarya Majmudar, Alamgir Khan and Jaswal have lent their voices for the film.

The track "Tere Bin Nahi Laage" is a recreation of Jaiswal's 2011 song, composed and produced by Amaal Mallik. Meet Bros Anjjan had recreated two songs for the film—"Deewana Tera" from Sonu Nigam's studio album Deewana (1999) was recreated as "Main Hoon Deewana Tera" with Arijit Singh providing vocals, and "Dhol Baaje" from Hum Dil De Chuke Sanam (1999) was recreated with the vocals of the trio and Monali Thakur.

== Release ==
The first song titled "Desi Look" was released as single on 19 February 2015, and its music video released the following day. The second song "Tere Bin Nahi Laage" was released on 27 February, and the third song "Saiyaan Superstar" was released on 5 March. The soundtrack album was released by T-Series on 10 March 2015.

== Critical reception ==
The soundtrack of Ek Paheli Leela received generally positive reviews from critics. Critic Rajiv Vijayakar from Bollywood Hungama gave the album a rating of 3 out of 5 and stated "some tracks will help the film, some will be helped by the film, but the rest are largely fillers. With four of the nine tracks being re-creations, the score gets a fillip in theory." Kasmin Fernandes of The Times of India gave a rating of 4 and commented that "the originals stand out more than adaptations here." Joginder Tuteja of Rediff.com gave the soundtrack three stars and wrote "the music of Ek Paheli Leela has a good mix of party and romantic numbers. It's the original numbers in the soundtrack that do better than the adapted versions. Play this one when you want some variety; it has a good mix of party and romantic numbers." Karthik Srinivasan of Milliblog wrote "Dr.Zeus alone unravels this paheli."

== Track listing ==
No.	Title	Lyrics	Music	Singer(s)	Length
1.	"Desi Look"	Kumaar	Dr. Zeus	Kanika Kapoor	3:27
2.	"Tere Bin Nahi Laage" (Male Version)	Kumaar	Uzair Jaswal, Amaal Mallik	Uzair Jaswal	3:41
3.	"Saiyaan Superstar"	Kumaar	Amaal Mallik	Tulsi Kumar	4:10
4.	"Khuda Bhi"	Manoj Muntashir	Tony Kakkar	Mohit Chauhan	5:03
5.	"Glamorous Ankhiyaan"	Kumaar	Meet Bros Anjjan	Meet Bros Anjjan, Krishna Beura	4:54
6.	"Main Hoon Deewana Tera"	Kumaar	Meet Bros Anjjan	Arijit Singh	5:24
7.	"Dhol Baaje"	Kumaar	Meet Bros Anjjan	Meet Bros Anjjan, Monali Thakur	5:37
8.	"Tere Bin Nahi Laage" (Female Version)	Kumaar	Uzair Jaswal, Amaal Mallik	Aishwarya Majmudar, Tulsi Kumar, Alamgir Khan	4:31
9.	"Ek Do Teen Chaar"	Tony Kakkar	Tony Kakkar	Neha Kakkar, Tony Kakkar	3:13
Total length:					39:54

== Remix album ==
Ek Paheli Leela Remix

Remix album by DJ Chetas
- Released: 24 March 2015
- Genre: Remix album
- Length: 26:51
- Label: T-Series

Singles from Ek Paheli Leela Remix
- 1. "Glamorous Ankhiyaan (MBA Swag)" Released: 19 March 2015

A remix album was made by DJ Chetas and was released on T-Series' YouTube channel on 24 March 2015.

No.	Title	Lyrics	Music	Singer(s)	Length
1.	"Glamorous Ankhiyaan" (MBA Swag)	Kumaar	DJ Chetas	Meet Bros Anjjan, Krishna Beura	4:56
2.	"Main Hoon Deewana Tera" (MBA Swag)	Kumaar	DJ Chetas	Arijit Singh	3:39
3.	"Desi Look" (Remix)	Kumaar	DJ Chetas	Kanika Kapoor	4:02
4.	"Saiyaan Superstar" (Remix)	Kumaar	DJ Chetas	Tulsi Kumar	3:22
5.	"Tere Bin Nahi Laage" (Remix) (Male Version)	Kumaar	DJ Chetas	Uzair Jaswal	3:21
6.	"Khuda Bhi" (Remix)	Manoj Muntashir	DJ Chetas	Mohit Chauhan	4:38
7.	"Ek Do Teen Chaar" (Remix)	Tony Kakkar	DJ Chetas	Neha Kakkar, Tony Kakkar	2:53
Total length:					26:51
