= Movahed =

Movahed or Movahhed (Persian: موحد) is originally an Arabic name (from v-h-d, وحد) that may refer to:

- Abdollah Movahed (1940–2026), Iranian wrestler
- Bahar Movahed Bashiri (born 1979), Iranian portrait caricaturist and classical vocalist
- Mohammad Bagher Movahed Abtahi (1928–2014), Iranian religious leader
- Mohammad Ali Movahed (born 1923), Iranian mystic, jurist, writer, and academician
- Ziya Movahed (born 1943), Iranian poet and philosopher
