= Baharon Ki Manzil =

Baharon Ki Manzil (lit. 'Destination of Springs') may refer to:

- Baharon Ki Manzil (1968 film), a 1968 Indian Hindi-language mystery drama film by Yakub Hassan Rizvi, starring Meena Kumari and Dharmendra
- Baharon Ki Manzil (1973 film), a 1973 Pakistani film directed by S. Suleman
- Baharon Ke Manzil (1991 film), a 1991 Indian Hindi-language romance film by Madhava Rao, starring Rakesh Bedi and Mona Ambegaonkar

== See also ==
- Baharon (disambiguation)
