= Vineh =

Vineh or Vinah may refer to:

- Vineh of Tung, Bulgarian king
- Vineh Peak, mountain in the South Shetland Islands
- Vineh, Alborz, a village in Alborz Province, Iran
- Vinah, Kermanshah, a village in Kermanshah Province, Iran
