= Baharan =

Baharan is an iranian female first name. It is a poetic name with the meaning of plural of spring (bahar), springtime, arriving of spring.

Baharan (Persian: بهاران) may refer to:

- Baharan Shahr, a city in Iran
- Baharan, Isfahan, a village in Isfahan Province, Iran
- Baharan, Kermanshah, a village in Kermanshah Province, Iran
- Baharan, Markazi, a village in Markazi Province, Iran
- Baharan District, an administrative subdivision of Iran

== See also ==
- Bahar (disambiguation)
- Bahara (disambiguation)
