= Universal College Islamabad =

- یونیورسل کالج اسلام آباد
- Former names: University College of Islamabad
- Type: Private
- Established: 1992; 34 years ago
- Principal: Dr. Maria Catalina Alliende
- Location: Islamabad, Pakistan; 33.670873130279624°N 73.04452328085763°E
- Campus: Urban
- Website: www.uci.edu.pk

The Universal College Islamabad (UCI), formerly known as University College of Islamabad, is a higher education university based in 40-B, Kirthar Road, Sector H-9/4, Islamabad

Universal College Islamabad was founded in 1992 by Dr. Alan Bicker with the support of prominent Pakistani scientists who noticed a dearth of quality higher education. UCI is a pioneer in offering the International Programmes in Pakistan. Dr. Maria Catalina Alliende is the Principal of the College.

UCI offers University of London LLB, Higher National Diploma (HND), Institute of Chartered Accountants in England and Wales (ICAEW), Chartered Institute of Management Accountants (CIMA), ACCA the UK, ATHE Law and others. All these are recognized by the Higher Education Commission of Pakistan.

UCI collaborated in 2021 with Monroe College, New York City, USA and introduced the first bilateral American MBA program in Pakistan.

== Notable alumni ==
- Ali Rehman Khan
- Ali Muhammad Khan
- Uzair Jaswal
- Hira Pervaiz
- Zara Qaiser
- Khadija Khan
- Tehmina Shaukat
- Komal Shakeel
- Anas Ali Rao
- Barrister Syed Qamar Sabzwari
- Barrister Faisal Khan Toru
- Barrister Mumtaz Ali
- Barrister Sajeel Swati
