= Sadia Khan =

Pakistani actress and model

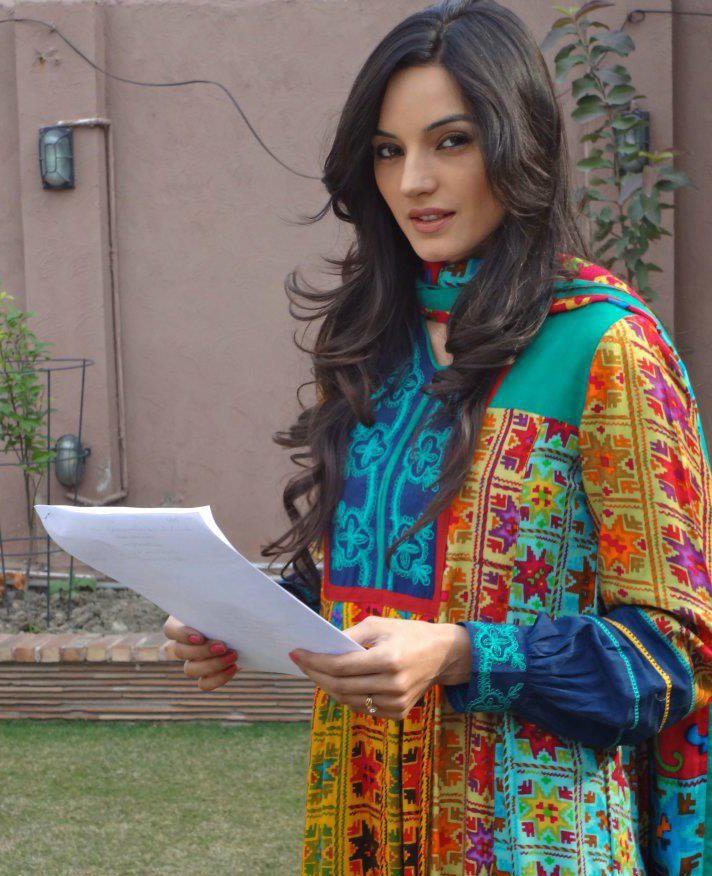
- Sadia Khan
- Born: 9 October 1987 (age 39)
- Education: Master of Business Administration
- Alma mater: University of Karachi
- Occupation: Actress
- Years active: 2011–present
- Height: 1.70 m (5 ft 7 in)

Halima Sadia Khan, professionally known as Sadia Khan, is a Pakistani actress and model. She is known for roles in the television dramas Khuda Aur Muhabbat, Laa, Shayad and Maryam Pereira, and in the films Abdullah: The Final Witness and Huey Tum Ajnabi. She has also worked in fashion and commercial campaigns in Pakistan and the United Arab Emirates, and is based in Dubai.

Khan has worked opposite actors including Imran Abbas, Mikaal Zulfiqar and Ahsan Khan, and has appeared in productions directed by Anjum Shahzad, Syed Ali Raza Usama, Iqbal Hussain and Kamran Shahid. She received two nominations at the International Pakistan Prestige Awards for her work in Khuda Aur Muhabbat.

== Career ==
Khan is known for playing a variety of roles in television serials including Eman in Khuda Aur Muhabbat (2011), Naina Syed in Laa (2014), Umm-e-Hani in Shayad, (2017) and Maryam in Maryam Periera (2018). She also appeared in films Dunno Y2... Life Is a Moment (2015) and Abdullah: The Final Witness (2016).

== International Appearances ==
Halima Sadia Khan's public profile has increasingly extended beyond Pakistan. In May 2026, she made her debut at the Cannes Film Festival, walking the red carpet in a gown by Lebanese designer Gaby Charbachy. ''The Express Tribune'' also reported her appearance among Pakistani actors and designers attending the festival.

In July 2026, Khan was spotted at Paris Fashion Week, where she attended a Dior show. She documented her first Dior experience at Paris Fashion Week on her social-media account, describing it as a milestone in her career.

== Filmography ==
Year	Title	Role	Director	Notes	Refs
Television
2010	Yariyan	Salma	Asif Raza Mir		
2011	Khuda Aur Mohabbat	Iman	Anjum Shahzad		
2014	Laa	Naina Syed	Farooq Rind		
2016–2017	Khuda Aur Mohabbat 2	Iman	Syed Ali Raza Usama		
2017	Mushrik	Payal	Kamran Qureshi		
2017–2018	Shayad	Umm-e-Hani	Syed Ali Raza Usama		
2018–2019	Maryam Periera	Maryam Periera	Iqbal Hussain		
2024	Dil Ka Kya Karein	Sheherbano / Sherry	Fahim Burney		
Film
2015	Dunno Y2... Life Is a Moment	Aisha	Sanjay Sharma	Indian-Norwegian Film	
2016	Abdullah: The Final Witness	Zahira	Hashim Nadeem		
2023	Huey Tum Ajnabi	Zeenat	Kamran Shahid		
