= Abdullah: The Final Witness =

- Theatrical release poster
- Directed by: Hashim Nadeem
- Written by: Hashim Nadeem
- Based on: Real-life Events
- Produced by: Hashim Nadeem
- Starring: Imran Abbas; Sadia Khan; Hameed Sheikh; Imran Tareen; Sajid Hassan; Zuhab Khan
- Cinematography: Saleem Dad; Melcome and Liaqat
- Edited by: Adeel Zaidi; Sheryqar; Bilaal
- Music by: Roger John; Sohail keys
- Production company: Taurus Films
- Distributed by: IMGC Distribution Club
- Release dates: 15 May 2015 (Cannes Film Festival); 28 October 2016 (Pakistan)
- Running time: 120 Mins
- Country: Pakistan
- Language: Urdu
- Box office: Rs0.10 crore

Abdullah: The Final Witness is a 2015 Pakistani drama film written, produced and directed by Hashim Nadeem, featuring Hameed Sheikh, Imran Abbas and Sadia Khan in lead roles. The film focuses on the Kharotabad Incident which took lives of five Russian citizens, allegedly mistaken to be suicide bombers by the Frontier Constabulary force, at the Kharotabad check post in Quetta.

The film was selected to be screened at the 2015 Cannes Film Festival and became third national film to do so. IMGC Distribution Club will release the film in Pakistan on 21 October 2016. First it was published in the form of a novel. There are two parts of novel Abdullah.

== Plot ==
The film is based on Kharotabad Incident involved the killing of five Russian and Tajik citizens at the Kharotabad check post by the Frontier Constabulary who claimed the five were terrorists. The incident was filmed by a journalist and footage was aired on media channels who reported that the five victims were in fact innocent citizens. The chief justice of Pakistan at that time took suo moto notice of the incident and a commission was asked to prepare the Kharotabad Inquiry Report, the findings of which have never been made public with the case remaining unresolved. A key witness of the killings was murdered in Quetta in December 2011.

== Cast ==
- Hameed Sheikh as Abdullah
- Sajid Hassan as SP Zaman
- Habeebullah Panezai as Shinkai
- Imran Abbas as Gullalai
- Sadia Khan as Zahira
- Imran Tareen as Ali
- Yameen Shah as Sher Khan
- Saleem Mughal
- Asal Din Khan
- Sultan
- Durdana
- Parvez
- Najeeb
- Zuhab Khan

== Production ==
=== Filming ===
The film's shooting took a total of 25–30 days and it was shot mainly in the Pakistani City of Quetta.

=== Editing ===
Due to the present security situation and sensitive issues in the film, the film had to go through three 'major cuts' (editing), before Pakistani Film Censor Board gave it the green light and approved the film for general screening in Pakistan.

== Release ==
The film is selected to screen in 2015 Cannes Film Festival on 15 May 2015. The Film's trailer was released online in December, 2014. A Rumour was created by news agencies that film is releasing nationwide on 5 June 2015 but the Director turned down the Rumour. Whilst speaking to Express Tribune IMGC Distribution Club have confirmed that they will be exclusively distributing the film in Pakistan nationwide on 21 October 2016.

== See also ==
- List of directorial debuts
- List of Pakistani films of 2016
