= Huey Tum Ajnabi =

2023 Pakistani film by Kamran Shahid

- Theatrical release poster
- Urdu: ہوئے تم اجنبی
- Directed by: Kamran Shahid
- Written by: Kamran Shahid
- Produced by: Shahid Hameed
- Starring: Mikaal Zulfiqar; Sadia Khan
- Cinematography: Ishtiaq Ahmed
- Edited by: Rizwan AQ
- Music by: Various artists Baqir Abbas (score)
- Production company: Shahid Films
- Distributed by: Mandviwalla Entertainment
- Release date: 22 April 2023
- Running time: 153 minutes
- Country: Pakistan
- Language: Urdu
- Box office: est. Rs. 2 crore

Huey Tum Ajnabi (lit. 'And You Became A Stranger') is a 2023 Pakistani historical romantic drama film, written and directed by Kamran Shahid in his debut. Set during the events of the Fall of Dhaka, the story revolves around two lovers played by Mikaal Zulfiqar and Sadia Khan.

After two years of development since 2014, three years of filming, and then post-production phase and further delay due to the COVID-19 pandemic in Pakistan, the film was released on Eid al-Fitr, 22 April 2023, by Shahid Films and Mandviwalla Entertainment.

== Premise ==
BBC Urdu quoted the director as saying that the film revolves around two lovers, Zeenat and Nizam, who meet at Dhaka University (Note: Although the name was Dacca University before 1980s, the film still used the new name.) while a war is raging in former East Pakistan in the beginning of the 1970s. They have to face the fundamentalists and ultra-nationalists, and have to choose between their love or the nation they belong to.

== Cast ==
- Mikaal Zulfiqar as Nizamuddin, a Punjabi student
- Sadia Khan as Zeenat, a Bengali student
- Sohail Ahmed as Khanum Jaan, a tawaif who is also a secret ally of the Mukti Bahini
- Mehmood Aslam as Sheikh Mujibur Rahman
- Samina Peerzada as Indira Gandhi
- Ayesha Omar as Ayesha, a journalist
- Shamoon Abbasi as Jabbar, a Mukti Bahini commander
- Alyy Khan as Colonel Afrasiab, a Pakistani military officer
- Adnan Jilani as Zulfikar Ali Bhutto
- Shafqat Cheema (Note: His role is unclear, he played either Nizamuddin's father or uncle; that too, either paternal or maternal.)
- Shehzad
- Adnan Haider
- Humna
- Hasan Shahnawaz Zaidi
- Shahid Hameed as Farooq, head of Mukti Bahini
- Nisho as Nizamuddin's mother

== Production ==
=== Development ===
Kamran Shahid, a journalist by profession, revealed that after he was inspired with the book Dead Reckoning: Memories of the 1971 Bangladesh War by Sarmila Bose, he began writing the script in 2014. After two years of pre-production, he took self-responsibility to direct the film as well, marking his debut in this field despite being a novice. The director called its genres to be romantic movie more than a political one, based on before and after the 1971 war, so he characterized only three political figures in the film; Zulfikar Ali Bhutto, Sheikh Mujibur Rahman, and Indira Gandhi.

=== Casting and filming ===
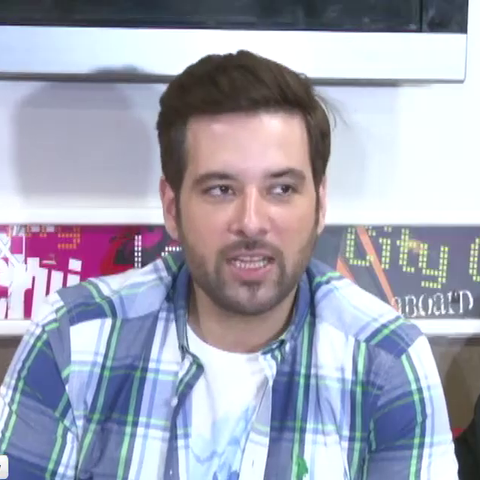
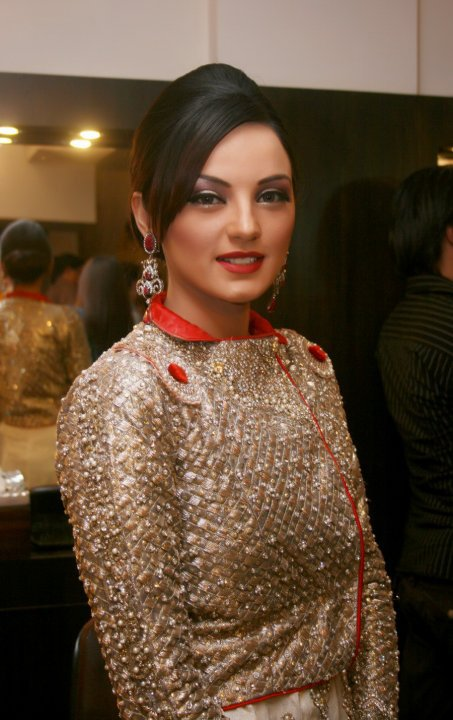
Zulfiqar and Khan appeared as lead pair in the film Huey Tum Ajnabi.

In November 2016, Dawn Images reported that Sadia Khan and Mikaal Zulfiqar have signed for the lead roles in a film split between East and West Pakistan. Other actors involved were named to be Alyy Khan and Shamoon Abbasi. The project was under the working title The Trial and initially intended to be released in March 2017. An earlier report in March had also suggested the involvement of actress Resham. Later, in November 2018, Vogue India reported Ayesha Omar being a part of this film as well.

Principal photography started in late-2016 and took place in Karachi and Lahore. Though the film was self-financed, they received logistical supports by the Inter-Services Public Relations as well.

=== Post-production ===
After being wrapped up, the film went into the post-production phase in 2019. They had another intention of releasing it either on the festive holiday in 2020, or at the fiftieth anniversary of the Fall of Dhaka in 2021. But the plans ware scrapped due to the COVID-19 pandemic and closure of the nationwide cinemas. Ishtiaq Ahmed served as the cinematographer, Sreejesh Nair as the sound designer, Scott Newman as the VFX artist, Rizwan AQ as the film editor, Baqir Abbas as the film score composer, and the director's father Shahid Hameed as the film producer. (Note: Details, like song titles, credits, and episodes, extracted from Shahid Films' channel on YouTube) The musical instruments, color grading techniques, and wardrobe stylings were also inspired from that era to depict the proper period.

=== Soundtrack ===
Reportedly, the film soundtrack consists of 11 songs by various artists. The title track is performed by Baqir Abbas with Ali Zafar, with lyrics by Abass Tabish, which is said to be inspired by Faiz Ahmad Faiz's poetry "Hum Kay Thehray Ajnabi". Other tracks include "Ranjhy Bina" by Abida Parveen, "Sunri Pawan" by Maria Meer, "Naina" by Naveed Nashad and Beena, "Teri Or" by Asim Azhar, rendition of "Mere Rashke Qamar" by Saima Jahan, a rendition of "Tajdar-e-Haram", etc.

== Release ==
=== Theatrical ===
In September 2019, Huey Tum Ajnabi was revealed to be the title. The film trailer was launched in February 2023. It was released on 22 April 2023, with another film Money Back Guarantee, and collected Rs. 2 crore during the Eid al-Fitr holidays. It is produced by the Shahid Films and distributed by the Mandviwalla Entertainment.

=== Home media ===
In November 2024, the project was revamped and released as a 36-episode TV series by Pakistan Television Corporation, (Note: Episodes playlist on YouTube by PTV Home, and a promo on their official website) following the similar format as was of 2015 film Bin Roye and its subsequent TV series.

== Critical reception ==
In a review for PakistaniCinema.net, Azadar Kazmi wrote that the shift between the "romantic track and the historical drama" is "bizarre", however, praised the VFX and war scenes. Nida Usman Chaudhry wrote in The Friday Times that the "technique of inserting song after song" is a "distraction", however, praised the VFX, cinematography and film score in some areas. Omair Alavi compared it with the other local releases depicting the same period, including Jo Bichar Gaye (2022), Khaab Toot Jaatay Hain (2021), and Khel Khel Mein (2021), and called this as the weaker project in his review in VOA Urdu.

Mohammad Kamran Jawaid of Dawn called the film's "tone and style" of being decades older from the VHS timeline, and despite he noted some issues, he called it "still manages to hold the stylistic flair of a big-screen movie". Fizza Abbas of Dawn Images rated the film 2 out 5, noting "some limitations in storytelling but brilliance in CGI". Hamid Mir of Geo News wrote that the film is good from the aspect of production, but the depiction of historical events is misheld. Hurmat Majid of Youlin Magazine said that despite "commendable performances" and "stunning cinematography", it falls short of becoming a "well-made film".

== See also ==
- List of Pakistani films of 2023
