= Waqas =

Waqas is a masculine given name of Arabic origin. Notable people with the name include:

- Waqas Ahmed (disambiguation), several people
- Waqas Akbar (born 1988), Pakistani field hockey player
- Waqas Ali Qadri, member of the band Outlandish
- Waqas Barkat (born 1990), Pakistani cricketer
- Waqas Hassan Mokal (born 1976), Pakistani politician
- Waqas Khan (born 1999), Hong Kong cricketer
- Waqas Mahmood Maan, Pakistani politician
- Waqas Maqsood (born 1987), Pakistani cricketer
- Waqas Mohammed Ali Awad, Yemeni detainee at Guantanamo Bay
- Waqas Parvez, perpetrator of the Murder of Aqsa Parvez
- Waqas Riaz, member of the dance group DhoomBros
- Waqas Saleem (born 1985), Pakistani cricketer
