= Sajna =

Single by Uzair Jaswal
- Recorded: 2015
- Genre: Pop; Pakistani
- Length: 8:09
- Label: Jaswal Films
- Songwriter: Uzair Jaswal

Music video
- "Sajna" on YouTube

"Sajna" is a 2015 single by Uzair Jaswal. Written by Jaswal himself, it was directed by his brother Yasir Jaswal and produced by Waqas Hassan. The music video features Uzair and actors Osman Khalid Butt and Armeena Rana Khan.

It was well received by critics and was nominated in two categories at 4th Hum Awards including, Best Music Single for Uzair and Hum Award for Best Music Video for Yasir. Sajna won both awards for best single and best music video.

== Cast and Crew ==
- Singer: Uzair Jaswal
- Featuring Artist: Osman Khalid Butt and Armeena Rana Khan.
- Lyricist: Uzair Jaswal
- Music video director: Yasir Jaswal
- Record Producers: Tajha Malik and Waqas Hassan
- Record Label: Jaswal Films
- Cinematography: Mo Azmi

Personnel

- Composer: Uzair Jaswal
- Audio mastering: Sarmad Ghafoor

== Accolades ==
The single receives following nomination at 2016 Hum Awards:

Year	Award	Category	Recipient(s)	Result
2016	4th Hum Awards	Best Music Single	Uzair Jaswal	Won
2016	4th Hum Awards	Hum Award for Best Music Video	Uzair Jaswal	Nominated
