= Anima State =

- Film poster
- Directed by: Hammed Khan
- Written by: Hammed Khan
- Produced by: Hammed Khan
- Starring: Uns Mufti; Malika Zafar
- Cinematography: Shabaz Shigri
- Edited by: Adam Khanzade
- Production companies: Animage Productions and Number Eight Films
- Release date: 5 December 2013 (SAIFF)
- Running time: 80 minutes
- Country: Pakistan
- Languages: Urdu, English
- Budget: $100,000

Anima State is a Pakistani satirical thriller film directed by Hammed Khan and produced by Atif Ghani in 2013. It is one of the emerging groundbreaking works being created by the reborn Pakistani film industry It has been banned by the government and hence did not play in any major cinemas in the country. It contains themes of an irresponsible media, apathetic youths, political stagnation and class struggle. It has played in various film festivals and shows a very different side of Pakistan.

The film is a series of encounters between the protagonist and various archetypes of people who live in Pakistan. The film was written and directed by London-based Pakistani filmmaker Hammad Khan. This is his second film and acts as sort of fantasy sequel to his first film "Slackistan". The film is still being dismissed by major Pakistani institutions but is quickly gathering a large following. This film was a collaboration between Animage Production and Number Eight Films.

It premiered at the 2013 South Asian International Film Festival.

== Plot ==
The film opens with a group of college kids sitting in a coffee shop, silent and bored. As they as exiting the building, they are all shot and killed by a strange man whose face is covered in bandages. The strange man approaches them from a distance and shoots all five of them. After which he gets into a taxi and exits the scene.

We then see the Stranger roaming around the hills of Islamabad. He seems to be experiencing some sort of psychosis, as clips from various news channels and radio shows play in his head. He goes up to a police officer and asks to be arrested. The policeman dismisses him. After being refused thrice and having his money taken, the stranger shoots the police officer.

The Stranger sits inside a hospital, waiting to be looking at however no one shows up. He exits the hospital and finds a beggar woman asking for money and her child obliviously playing with the toy camera. The Stranger opens his wallet but finds it empty, for having tried to bribe the policeman. He hands the poor woman all his credit cards and walks away. We then see the poor woman look at the cards and then throw them away.

The Stranger sneaks into a projector room and sleeps there. A series of old pop culture films and news clips play. We see him slip out as soon as the projectionist comes back.

We find our protagonist in a restaurant. The waiter complains of bad economic conditions and we see a woman whose hands are covered in blood, standing by the window. She looks exactly like the beggar woman at the hospital.

The Stranger bumps into a laughing madman on an intersection. He goes home with him and has a few joints. He watches TV and masturbates to an old clip of Pakistan winning the cricket world cup in the '70s.

The laughing madman and the Stranger walk hand in hand around the hill station but eventually, the eccentric man is shot down too.

Later, the Stranger goes to a news agency and asks to be on the show. The news anchor refuses, saying that there are too many other important things to talk about. The Stranger understanding the fact that the Anchor is merely choosing sensational news, offers to shoot himself on air during an interview. The News Anchor agrees.

During the live interview on the show, The Stranger looks nervous. After 20 questions, the Stranger shoots the News Anchor instead of himself. The crew keeps rolling. He then tells the population that media turns them into monkeys and that they should go out and do something instead.

The Stranger enters a room and finds a hooker, she tells him eccentric stories about her customers. They make love and his bandages come off.

We see our Stranger with his bandages off, carrying a camera around. He sits down next to a young girl at a Café, who recognizes him as the director of the film Anima State. Soon she is joined by an army of other youths, who begin beating him with their keyboards. The Stranger runs away and finds himself in crowd of people blocking the highway, protesting the corrupt government. However, most of the people seem to be more interested in being on TV rather than actually changing anything.

The stranger hops on a boat, that’s being driven by the projectionist. The boat is just roaming a lake. However, the Stranger closes his eyes and tells the boatman to take him somewhere far away.

== Cast ==
- Uns Mufti as The Stranger/Filmmaker
- Malika Zafar as the Archetypes of Women
- Omar Khalid Butt as The Anchor
- Johnny Mustafa as The Laughing Madman
- Muhammad Waheed as The Waiter
- Sobia Rasheed as The Twitter Girl
- Waqas Gillis as The Projectionist/Boatman

== Music ==
The soundtrack for the film consists mostly of underground and popular Pakistani Bands.

- Helpless Enough to Write Impassioned Blogs by 6LA8
- We Would Still Need Reason i Heaven by 6LA8
- Bhung Ho by The Kominas
- King of Space by Talal Qureshi
- Symphony no.7 by Beethoven
- Bewafa Yun Tera Muskerana by Aziz Mian Qawwal

== Production ==
The film cost approximately 100,000 dollars to make and was shot entirely in Pakistan. The head of the production management team was Aisha Linnea Akhtar. The entire film was shot in Islamabad using various famous landmarks and popular locations to make the movie feel as personal as possible. Some of the popular locations were The Lime Tree Cafe, Kuch Khaas, Ali Medical Centre, Moti Mahal Cinema, The Hot Spot Cafe, Aghan TV Studios and USEFP. The editing of the film was carried out by Adam Khanzade and the colour grading by Tobias James Tomkins. The Cinematography was done by Shabaz Shigri.

== Release ==
The film was never officially released in Pakistan but it available for sale on online video platforms. However it was released in other countries as follows:

- 5 December 2013 (usa) – South Asian International Film Festival
- 12 April 2015 (Hungary) – Titanic International Filmpresence Festival
- 2 August 2015 (Canada) – Fantasia International Film Festival)

== Reception ==
The film was not passed by the Pakistani Board of Film Censors and hence never gained a commercial release. However, it was released by various small screening houses all over Pakistan and has gained a small cult following with other 2500 likes on Facebook. The film was also selected for various small film festivals in New York, Hungary and Canada. The reviews for this film are mixed but are mostly positive. This film does not portray a positive image of Pakistan as have others films in the past. A lot of social media personalities of Pakistan have lauded the content and the message while others have given it negative reviews because it "Lacked a Plot".

== See also ==
- Good Morning Karachi
- Slackistan
- Zinda Bhaag
