= Aladdin Allahverdiyev =

Azerbaijani scientist and professor (born 1947)

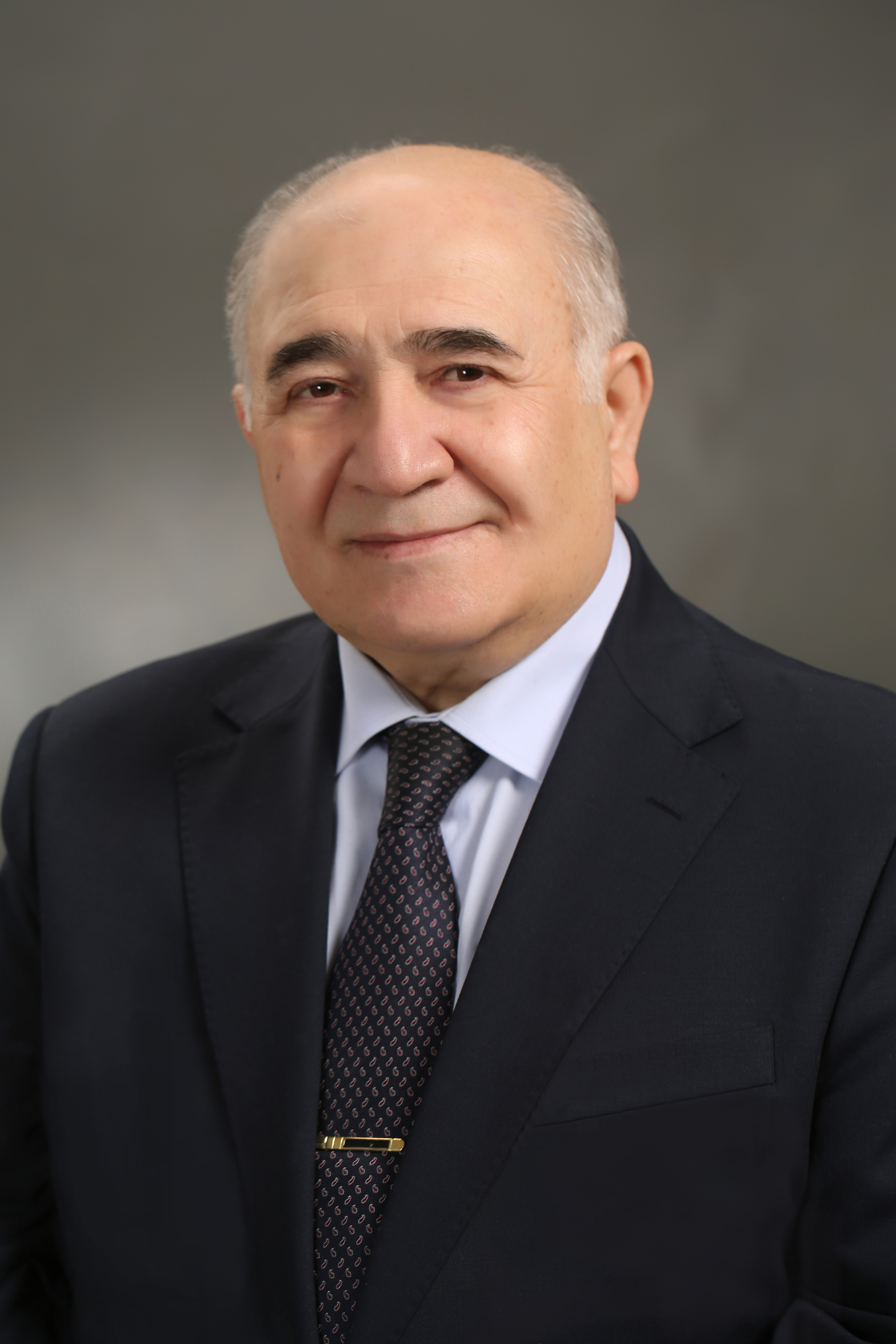
- Born: Azerbaijani: Allahverdiyev Ələddin Məmmədhüseyn oğlu 29 May 1947 (age 79); Kyasaman, Vardenis District, Armenian SSR, USSR
- Education: Lomonosov Moscow State University
- Known for: Professor, since 2001
- Scientific career
- Fields: Applied mathematics, physics, technology

Aladdin Allahverdiyev (Aladdin Allahverdiyev Mammadhuseyn; born 29 May 1947) is an Azerbaijani scientist and professor (2001). Soviet, Russian and Azerbaijani scientist in the field of mathematical models development and methods of studying wave and oscillatory processes to create piezoelectric devices and products used in the world's oceans and space studies, in marine seismic exploration, in electronic, defense and medical industries.

== Short biography ==
Aladdin Allahverdiyev was born 29 May 1947 in the village of Kyasaman Vardenis District of the Armenian SSR. In 1964 he finished high school No. 190 in Baku with a medal. The same year he entered the Mechanics and Mathematics Faculty (Department of Mechanics) of Azerbaijan State University named after S.M. Kirov. After the third year he continued his studies at the Mechanics and Mathematics Faculty of Lomonosov Moscow State University. After graduating the university he continued his studies as a postgraduate student at the Department of Wave and Gas Dynamics and later at a closed Dissertation Council defended the thesis "Investigation of electrical parameters of piezoelectric structures with associated fluctuations" and received his PhD in physical and mathematical sciences.

After finishing his postgraduate studies at Lomonosov Moscow State University in 1974 he was hired by All-Union Scientific Research Institute "FONON" of the USSR Ministry of Electronic Industry. In 1974–1994 he worked there as a junior researcher, senior researcher, and head of the department of "Mathematical Modeling".

In 1994–1995 he worked as Deputy General Director for science and production of joint Russian-American Company "Green Star International". In 1995–1996 he worked as Director of Zelenograd City Association of Small and Medium Business of Moscow.

In September 1996 he became the Head of the Department of Higher and Applied Mathematics and Professor of Moscow State Academy of Business Administration (MSABA). Also, in 1997–1998 he was the Dean of the Economics and Management Faculty, and from 2000 he became the First Vice-Rector on educational and methodical work of the academy.

From December 2010 till present time he has been working at Moscow Institute of Electronic Technology as Deputy Vice-Rector for education, Head of the Department of Quality Management of educational process, professor.

A. M. Allahverdiyev has devoted his life to science and education.

In the year 2001 A. M. Allahverdiyev by the decision of the Higher Attestation Commission of the Russian Federation was awarded the academic title of professor.

Under his supervision 7 postgraduate students have successfully defended their theses.

For several years, A. M. Allahverdiyev was a member of the Board of Vice-Rectors for academic affairs of higher education institutions of the Russian Federation, member of the Coordinating Council of the Department of Education of Moscow, a member of the MSABA Academic Council, and the Chairman of the Scientific and Methodological Council of the academy.

== Scientific and Educational Activities ==
While working at "FONON" Scientific Research Institute as the main theoretician of the Institute he was the scientific director or deputy chief designer of more than 30 scientific research and experimental design works (Research and Development), dedicated to the development of devices and products used in various fields of technology. Many scientific and technical results of his innovative solutions, which is evident from more than 150 scientific articles and 7 inventions published by A. M. Allahverdiyev, have been successfully applied in certain sectors of science and technology: in the study of the world ocean, in marine seismic surveys, implemented by electronic companies (especially in acoustics and microelectronics), defense and medical industries (in particular piezoceramic sensor developed by him and his co-workers have successfully been applied in the development and creation of an artificial heart).

In the 1970-80s, scientists and designers working in the field of piezo electronics were tasked to develop a piezo sensor with specified electro-physical parameters and minimal weight and volume. Using Pontryagin maximum principle he was the first to find a theoretical solution to this type of problems. He was also one of the first scientists, who in cooperation with his students solved two- and three-dimensional electroelastic dynamic tasks on the basis of generalized variation principle with the use of methods of finite and boundary elements. He was among the first scientist who could theoretically prove the existence of "edge effect" in piezoceramic disk membranes.

During the years of working at MSABA A. M. Allahverdiyev together with co-workers of the Department of Higher and Applied Mathematics headed by him published more than 20 textbooks and manuals for the use of mathematics in economics and management.

== Participation in scientific conferences ==
A.M. Allahverdiyev has presented more than 60 scientific reports (including 10 plenary ones) at 30 international, All-Union, All-Russian industrial conventions, conferences, and symposia, dedicated to the dissemination of surface waves in piezoelectric environments, and the research of electrical parameters of piezoceramic structures under associated fluctuations. Some of those scientific forums include:

1. All-Union Symposium on the propagation of elastic and elastic-plastic waves' (Frunze, 1974, Novosibirsk, 1986),
2. All-Union Conference on continuum mechanics' (Tashkent, 1979),
3. All-Union Conference on ferroelectricity' (Rostov-na-Donu, 1979, Minsk, 1982),
4. All-Union Conference on strength of materials and structural elements over sound and ultrasound loading frequencies' (Kiev, 1979, 1980, 1981, 1982),
5. All-Union Conference on theory of elasticity' (Tbilisi, 1984),
6. All-Union Conference on acoustic electronics and quantum acoustics' (Moscow, 1984),
7. All-Union Conference on the effect of external influences on the real structure of ferroelectric and piezoelectrics' (Chernogolovka, 1984),
8. All-Union Conference on Bounce Modeling and imitation on computer static testing of electronic technology products' (Moscow, 1985),
9. All-Union Congress on Theoretical and Applied Mechanics' (Tashkent, 1986),
10. All-Union Acoustic Conference' (Moscow, 1994),
11. International Conference on 'Crystals: growth, properties, real structure, application' (Alexandrov, 2001, 2002, 2003),
12. The International Jubilee Conference 'Single crystal and their application in the XX century – 2004' and so on.

At the last two conferences A. M. Allahverdiyev read 13 including 3 plenary reports. He was a member of either the organizing or program committee for some of these forums. Being a postgraduate student, he participated in the international conference on aeronautics in Baku (1973).

== Inventions ==
1. Author’s certificate No. 169926 from 4 September 1980
2. Author's certificate No. 179728 from 6 October 1982
3. Author's certificate No. 1063257 from 22 August 1983
4. Author's certificate No. 300747 from 1 September 1989
5. Author's certificate No. 1534760 from 8 September 1989
6. Author's certificate No. 308342 from 1 February 1990
7. Author's certificate No. 308340 from 1 February 1990

== Distinct research (scientific) articles ==
1. 'The theory of related oscillations of piezoceramic disks" / "К теории связанных колебаний пьезокерамических дисков" (В кн. "Волновая и газовая динамика", Изд. МГУ, в. 2, М., 1979), (in Russian).
2. "The oscillation of the piezoceramic pulse transducer for medical purposes"/ "О колебании пьезокерамического преобразователя пульса для медицинских целей" ("Военная техника и экономика", No. 3, М., 1978), (in Russian).
3. "Cylindrical piezo receiver of pressure for marine seismic" / "Цилиндрический пьезоприемник давления для морской сейсморазведки" ("Электроника", No. 7, М., 1984), (in Russian).
4. "The theory of unsteady oscillations of piezoceramic disks and wheels" / "К теории неустановившихся колебаний пьезокерамических дисков и колец" (Докл. АН УССР, No. 2 Т.,1980), (in Russian).
5. "Research on orientation characteristics of receiving-emitting transducers"/ "Исследование характеристик направленности приемо-излучающих преобразователей" ("Дефектоскопия", No. 6, Изд. АН СССР, M., 1990), (in Russian).
6. "Method of considering the impact of electrical boundary conditions on the bend in multilayer piezoelectric plates"/ "Метод учета влияния электрических граничных условий на изгиб многослойных пьезоэлектрических пластин", (Материалы докладов международной конференции "Кристаллы: рост, свойства. применение " Александров, 2002), (in Russian), (in Russian).
7. "Calculation of spherical piezoceramic transducers including losses" / "Расчет сферических пьезокерамических преобразователей с учетом потерь" ("Электронная техника", сер. Радиодетали и радиокомпоненты, в. 3(80), М., 1990), (in Russian).
8. "The method of calculating acoustic characteristics of multilayer piezoceramic transducers" / "Метод расчета акустических характеристик многослойных пьезокерамических преобразователей" (Материалы докладов международной конференции "Кристаллы: рост, свойства. применение " Ал-в, 2003), (in Russian).
9. "The study of composite piezoceramic transducers oscillations" / "Исследование колебаний составных пьезокерамических преобразователей" ("Электронная техника", сер. Радиодетали и радиокомпоненты, в. 2(67), М., 1987), (in Russian).
10. "Method for optimizing the shape of oscillating piezoelectric transducer "/ "Метод оптимизации формы пьезоэлектрических преобразователей, совершающих колебания" ("Прикладная механика" К., т. 26, No. 9, 1990"),(in Russian).
11. "The impact of impulse loads on the strength characteristics of piezoceramic elements" / "Влияние импульсных нагрузок на прочностные характеристики пьезокерамических элементов" (В кн.: "Прочность поликристаллических кристаллов", Изд. АН СССР, Л.,1981), (in Russian).
12. "Related unsteady oscillations of piezoceramic cylinders" / "Связанные неустановившиеся колебания пьезокерамических цилиндров" ("Изв. АН УССР, № 2 1982), (in Russian).
13. "The method of calculating the characteristics of piezoceramic transducers within resonant frequencies" / "Метод расчета характеристик пьезокерамических преобразователей в области резонансных частот", ("Электронная техника", сер. Радиодетали и радиокомпоненты, в. 1(82), М., 1991), (in Russian).
14. "Related unsteady oscillations of piezoceramic cylinders" /"Связанные неустановившиеся колебания пьезокерамических цилиндров " (Изв. АН УзССР, No. 2 1982), (in Russian).
15. 'The reliability increase when designing the spherical piezoceramic radiators', 'Spreading of surface acoustic waves in party-homogenous piezoelectric environments' (The International Jubilee Conference 'Single crystal and their application in the XX century – 2004', Aleksandrov, Russia, 2004).
16. 'The acoustical charasteristics of the cylindrical piezoceramic radiator vibrating in infinite liquid medium', 'Spreading of surface acoustic waves in party-homogeneous piezoelectric environments' (The International Jubilee Conference 'Single crystal and their application in the XX century – 2004' Aleksandrov, Russia, 2004)
17. 'Method for determining electroelastic constants of piezoceramic materials" / "Метод определения электроупругих констант пьезокерамических материалов" (В кн.: "Основы физики элементов микроэлектронных приборов", М.,1992), (in Russian).
18. "Method of calculating mechanical stress of piezoceramic rings and disks during alternating electric excitations" / "Метод расчета механических напряжений пьезокерамических колец и дисков при переменном электрическом возбуждении" (В кн.: "Прочность материалов и элементов конструкций при звуковых и ультразвуковых частотах нагружения", Киев, 1980), (in Russian).
19. "Related flexural-shear vibrations of layer-step disc of piezoceramic transducers" / "Связанные изгибно-сдвиговые колебания слойно-ступенчатых дисковых пьезокерамических преобразователей " (" Прикладная механика" Киев, 1987, т. 23, No. 5), (in Russian).
20. "Ultrasonic vibration frequency matching of various composite electroacoustic transducers" / "Согласование частот ультразвуковых колебаний различных составных электроакустических преобразователей". (В сб., "Материалы ХI Всесоюзной конференции по акустоэлектронике и квантовой акустике", Москва, 1984), (in Russian).
21. "Distribution of surface acoustic waves in a piecewise-homogeneous piezoelectric environments" / "Распространение поверхностных акустических волн в кусочно-однородных пьезоэлектрических средах". (В кн., "Материалы VI Всесоюзного сьезда по теоретической и прикладной механике", Изд. "Фан", Ташкент, 1986), (in Russian).
22. "Sustainable development as a paradigm of the philosophy of education" / "Устойчивое развитие как парадигма философии образования". (В кн., "Эпоха глобальных проблем (Опыт философского осмысления)". Изд. МГИДА, М., 2004), (in Russian).
23. "Applying mathematical methods in social sciences"/ "Применение математических методов в социальных науках". (В кн., "Экономика и социальная сфера: человек, город, Россия", Изд. МГИДА, М., 2005), (in Russian).
24. "Rating system as a self-oriented technology and its role in the development of student abilities" / "Рейтинговая система как личностно-ориентированная технология и её роль в развитии способностей студента". (В кн., "На путях к личностно-ориентированному образованию", Изд. МГИДА, М., 2000), (in Russian).
25. "Mathematics and its role in training modern managers" / "Математика и её роль в подготовке современных менеджеров". (В кн., "Философско-педагогический анализ проблемы гуманизации образовательного процесса", Изд. МГИДА, М., 2001), (in Russian).

== Some textbooks for universities ==
1. The numerical sequences. MSIBA, Moscow, 1998. / Числовые последовательности. Изд. МГИДА, Москва, 1998. (in Russian).
2. Mathematical analysis (for economic students). MSIBA, Moscow, 2001 / Математический анализ (для экономических специальностей). Изд. МГИДА, Москва, 2001(in Russian).
3. Applied Mathematics. Graph theory (for economic students). MSIBA, Moscow, 2001 / Прикладная математика. Теория графов. (для экономических специальностей). Изд. МГИДА, Москва, 2001,(in Russian).
4. Theory of Probability and Mathematical Statistics. MSIBA, Moscow, 2004 / Теория вероятностей и математическая статистика. Изд. МГИДА, Москва, 2004,(in Russian).
5. Linear algebra and elements of analytic geometry. MSIBA, Moscow, 2004 / Линейная алгебра и элементы аналитической геометрии. Изд. МГИДА, Москва, 2004,(in Russian).
6. Differential equations (for economic students). MSIBA, Moscow, 2005 / Дифференциальные уравнения. (для экономических специальностей). Изд. МГИДА, Москва, 2005,(in Russian).
7. Mathematical Statistics (for economic students). MSIBA, Moscow, 2005 / Математическая статистика. (для экономических специальностей). Изд. МГИДА, Москва, 2005,(in Russian).

== Honors ==
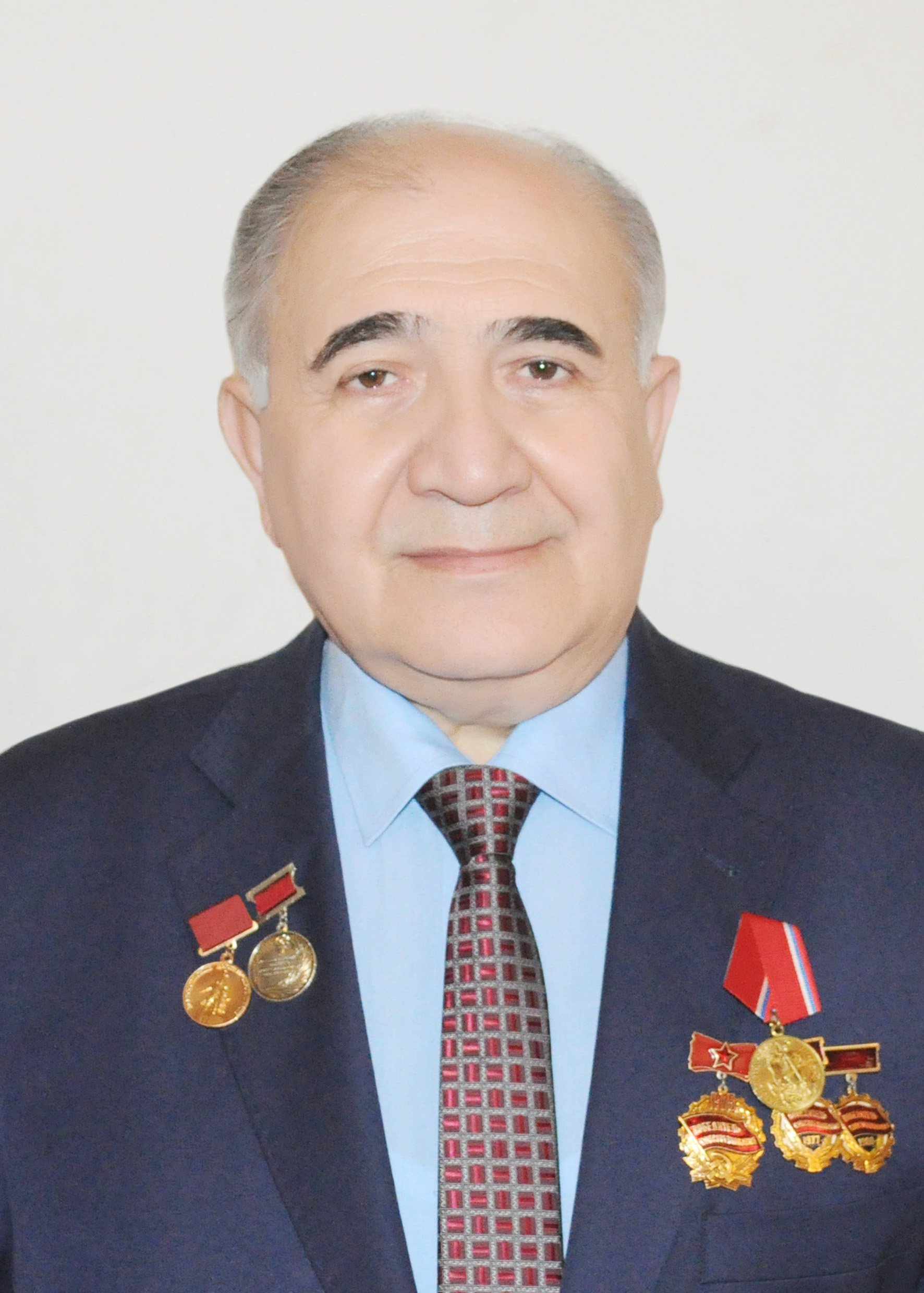

For achievements in scientific, industrial and pedagogical activities A. M. Allahverdiyev has received several governmental and industrial awards:

- the badge "Honorary Worker of Higher Professional Education"
- Medal "In Commemoration of the 850th Anniversary of Moscow" (1997)
- the medal "All-Russian Exhibition Center Laureat AEC"
- the medal "250 years of Lomonosov MSU"
- three badges of distinction for his work, established by the CPSU CC, the Soviet Ministers of the USSR, the Trade Unions CC and the LYCLSU CC in 1975, 1977 and 1980
- the Diploma of prize winner of the competition by the Presidium of the Central Board of the All-Union Scientific Medical and Technical Society for his personal contribution to the development of medical technology
- the laureate of the contest of the Moscow City Government 'Grant of Moscow' in the field of science and technology in education four times (2001–2004)
- a cash prize; dozens honorary diplomas and certificates of various organizations.
- By National Committee on Theoretical and Applied Mechanics of Russian Academy of Sciences was awarded the medal of Kh.A. Rakhmatulin, an outstanding mechanical scientist, Hero of Socialist Labor, academician, professor, Doctor of Physical and Mathematical Sciences, laureate of 4 orders of Lenin, several State Prizes of the USSR.
- By Federation of Cosmonautics of Russia was awarded the medal of G.A.Tyulin, Hero of Socialist Labor, Lieutenant General, Lenin Prize Laureate, Professor, Doctor of Technical Sciences.

== Family ==
Married. Has a son and daughter, and 4 grandchildren.

His wife, Makhsati Kengerli Ismail, was born in 1951 in Nakhchivan. She finished school in Nakhchivan with a medal. She graduated from the Faculty of Chemistry at Lomonosov Moscow State University. She has a PhD in Chemistry, and is a leading researcher at the Scientific Research Institute of Materials. She is the author of many scientific articles and holder of certificates of inventions (inventor's certificates).

His son, Togrul Allahverdiyev, was born in 1979 in Moscow. He graduated with honor from the Diplomatic Academy of the Ministry of Foreign Affairs of the Russian Federation (specialization 'World Economy'), and with honor from the State University of Management (specialization 'Management'). He has a PhD in economics. He is the author of the monograph 'Corporate Management of Innovative Development', and more than 10 scientific articles. He worked as Head of the Risk Management Department at Svyaz-Invest Company, Head of the Risk Management Department at Cherkizovo Group, Head of the Risk Management Department of the world-famous Russian steel company NLMK, which owns branches and factories in 7 countries of the world: in the United States, Canada, in Western Europe, and also in many regions of the Russian Federation. He is currently working in Amsterdam as executive director of Risk Management & Internal Control at Eurasian Resources Group. He is married and has a daughter.

His daughter, Allahverdiyeva-Rafibeyli Ayten was born in 1982 in Moscow. She finished Moscow general high school No. 842 with a medal. She graduated with honor from I.M. Sechenov First Moscow State Medical University. She finished residency studies and works as a surgeon in the city of Doha, the capital of the state of Qatar in the field of plastic surgery. She is married and has 3 children.

== Sources ==
1. Propagation of elastic and elastic-plastic waves. Frunze 1979, (in Russian).
2. The strength of materials and structural elements over sound and ultrasound loading frequencies. Kiev, 1979, (in Russian).
3. The effect of external influences on the real structure of ferroelectric and piezoelectrics. Chernogolovka, 1981,(in Russian).
4. Physical phenomena in polycrystalline ferroelectrics. Ed. AS USSR Leningrad, 1984, (in Russian).
5. The strength of polycrystalline ferroelectrics. Ed. AS USSR Leningrad, 1984, (in Russian).
6. Bounce/Failure Modeling and imitation on computer static testing of electronic technology products, Moscow, 1986? (in Russian)/
7. Physical foundations of microelectronics. Ed. MIET, Moscow, 1986, (in Russian).
8. Physical fundamentals of microelectronic devices. Ed. MIET, Moscow, 1987, (in Russian).
9. Mathematical modeling of physical processes in the microchip elements. Ed. MIET, Moscow, 1988, (in Russian).
10. Theoretical Foundations of functional electronics. Ed. MIET, Moscow, 1992, (in Russian).
11. Crystals, growth, properties, application. Ed. RAS, Aleksandrov, 2001,(in Russian).
12. Philosophic-pedagogical analyze of the problem humanization of educational process. Moscow, 2001, (in Russian).
13. The International Jubilee Conference 'Single crystal and their application in the XX century −2004' Aleksandrov, Russia, 2004
14. The era of global issues (experience of philosophical understanding). Ed. MSIBA, Moscow, 2004
15. The numerical sequence. Ed. MSIBA, Moscow, 1998, (in Russian).
16. Mathematical Analysis. Ed. MSIBA, Moscow, 2001, (in Russian).
17. Applied Mathematics. Graph theory. Ed. MSIBA, Moscow, 2001, (in Russian).
18. Differential equations. Ed. MSIBA, Moscow, 2005, (in Russian).
19. Theory of Probability and Mathematical Statistics. Ed. MSIBA, Moscow, 2004, (in Russian).
20. Linear algebra and elements of analytical geometry. Ed. MSIBA, Moscow, 2004, (in Russian).
21. Mathematical statistics. Ed. MSIBA, Moscow, 2005, (in Russian).
