= Maryam Periera =

Pakistani television series

- Written by: Riffat Siraj; Khalilullah Farooqui
- Directed by: Iqbal Khan
- Starring: Ahsan Khan; Sadia Khan
- Country of origin: Pakistan
- Original language: Urdu
- No. of seasons: 01
- No. of episodes: 21

Production
- Producer: Seema Taher Khan
- Camera setup: Multi-camera
- Running time: 30-45 minutes
- Production company: Real Entertainment

Original release
- Network: TVOne Pakistan; PTV Home
- Release: 10 October 2018 – 13 March 2019

Maryam Periera (Urdu: مریم پریرا) is a 2018 Pakistani drama serial aired on TV One. Starring Ahsan Khan and Sadia Khan, the drama was first aired on 10 October 2018.

== Plot ==
The serial focuses on the minorities in Pakistan and tells the story of Christian girl named Maryam Periera who teaches in a college to support her family as her father had died.

== Cast ==
- Ahsan Khan as Ali Khan
- Sadia Khan as Maryam Periera
- Emmad Irfani as Sufyan
- Rasheed Naz as Hakim Khan (Ali Khan's father)
- Ayub Khoso
- Shaheen Khan as Ayesha
- Seemi Raheel as Maryam Periera's mother
- Farhan Iqbal
- Ayesha Khan as Bilal's mother
- Laila Zuberi
- Fariya Hassan as Jenny
- Mizna Waqas as Tabassum
