= Kharotabad =

Kharotabad خروٹ آباد
- Location within Pakistan
- Coordinates: 30°13′N 66°58′E
- Country: Pakistan
- Province: Balochistan
- Time zone: UTC+5 (PST)

Kharotabad (Urdu: خروٹ آباد) or Kili Khezi is a neighborhood of Quetta, Balochistan, Pakistan.

== Kharotabad Incident ==
The Kharotabad Incident refers to the deaths of four Russians and one Tajik citizen at a Frontier Corps (FC) checkpoint in Kharotabad in May 2011. They were shot on the basis of reports that they were suicide bombers. A police surgeon who testified against the official account was later also claimed to be shot dead.

The Kharotabad Commission Report is a compiled judicial inquiry papers covering the prelude and causes of the police raid in Kharotabad area of Quetta, Balochistan province of Pakistan on 18 May 2011.

== See also ==
- Kharotabad Incident
- Kharotabad Commission Report
