= Kharotabad incident =

Killing of Russians and a Tajik citizen in Quetta, Pakistan

External videos
- Funeral of the victims

The Kharotabad incident refers to the deaths of four Russians and one Tajik citizen at a Frontier Corps (FC) checkpoint in Kharotabad area of Quetta, Balochistan, Pakistan in May 2011. They were shot on the basis of reports that they were suicide bombers. A police surgeon who testified against the official account was later also claimed to be shot dead.

== The incident ==
On 20 May 2011, a group of 5 Russian citizens and 1 Tajik, (3 women 2 men and 1 Baby) had been travelling in a rented car in Balochistan, a province of Pakistan. They had passed through several police checkpoints and even been searched, but as they approached another checkpoint in the Kharotabad neighbourhood of Quetta, they exited the car and proceeded on foot. A previous security checkpoint near the Quetta airport had sent a message to the place they were now that five Chechens were approaching the Kharotabad checkpoint. The Frontier Corps soldiers and Balochistan Police manning the Kharotabad checkpoint came to understand that they were about to be attacked by Chechen suicide bombers and acted accordingly. As the 5 travellers approached the checkpoint they were greeted with a volley of bullets and all fell to the ground. There was a long period during which no firing was done, and during which several of the victims were still alive and moving, including the two women who were seen holding hands. One of the injured women on the ground waved her arm and pleaded for mercy. It is during that time that TV crews and many officers arrived on the scene. Then another volley of bullets was fired at the group as they lay on the ground until no sign of life could be seen. This second volley of bullets was filmed and photographed by many members of the Press and by Pakistani TV crews. The corpses were then pulled away from each other with ropes tied around their wrists and ankles for it was feared that they wore suicide vests.

Initial news reports, that persistently only identified the five as Chechens, indicated that they were suicide bombers that were in possession of grenades and explosives and that they had hurled grenades at police. There was even a report of a Pakistani soldier killed in the "exchange" (a likely case of friendly fire). The day after the incident, the Quetta chief of police, Dawood Ahmad Junejo, stated in a Press conference that "The five Chechens were not killed in firing by security personnel, but in a bomb explosion". He further stated that "five mobile phones, two diaries, 48 fuses, seven detonators, a computer disc and CDs were recovered from the alleged suicide bombers".

Later reports in the media proclaimed that the foreigners had "little else except shampoo bottles", but was followed by conflicting reports and statements.

The daily Dawn on Thursday quoted witnesses as saying that the suspects were unarmed, had put up no resistance to the security forces and appeared to be about to surrender when they were gunned down. Officials of a bomb disposal squad which searched the bodies after the shooting told Reuters that they found no explosives strapped to the bodies of the Chechens. They were unarmed and had no suicide jackets or explosives with them," one of the officials said. "Five valid and two expired Russian passports were found in a ladies' handbag lying with the bodies," the second official said.

An autopsy performed on the bodies of the five Russians determined that all died from bullet wounds, and found no trace of explosives on their bodies. One of the women was 7 months pregnant.

Later news articles revealed that the five had been forced to bribe their way through police checkpoints, where the policemen had even asked for sexual favours from the young women. When a similar incident occurred at subsequent checkpoint, the group fled, asking their hired Pakistani driver to find a route to by-pass further checkpoints. This is when their driver made them get out of the car and continue on foot. The second checkpoint called the one where the shootout occurred to warn them about the car with the five Chechen foreigners. One article stated that Policemen had taken all their money from them [as a bribe]," he said. "Then they prayed at a mosque along with the women. Local people told them to lodge a complaint at the PFC check post against the police. The policemen, however, told the PFC people [by phone] that the five people were suicide bombers."

A police surgeon who performed an autopsy on the deceased, Dr. Baqir Shah, while testifying in court, rejected the claim that the foreigners had attacked the police with hand grenades.

== Identities of the victims ==
One of the Russian passports is in the name of Olga Shreder, born in Yakutsk in the Sakha Republic of the Russian Federation, on 15 January 1992. Her passport had been issued on 3 January 2006 and had expired on 3 January 2011. She was not an ethnic Chechen.

On 31 May 2011, the Vice Consul of Russian Consulate in Karachi, Mr Tural Dzhavadov, said that the five foreigners who died in Quetta were not Chechens. "Four of the five persons appear to be Russian nationals and one of them looks like a Tajik. They are not Chechens".

Relatives of some of the victims revealed that the pregnant woman was Olga Sherada, a Russian citizen, and that she was the wife of victim Nauman Tajik, a Tajik National.

== Aftermath ==
The police surgeon who conducted the autopsy on the victims of Kharotabad shooting and who contradicted the police version that the five had died as a result of a grenade blast that they had themselves detonated, has been attacked and hospitalised in Quetta, a few hours after he testified in court. A group of people pulled up outside a restaurant where he was eating and dragged the surgeon out and severely beat him up. He had to be rushed to the civil hospital.

A driver that had driven the five victims just before they were killed, retracted an earlier statement he had made, in which he had claimed the five were armed. "I lied under duress that the foreigners were carrying hand grenades. The police threatened me with dire consequence" he claimed.

On 29 December 2011, it was reported that the police surgeon and key witness in the incident Dr. Baqir Shah was shot dead by unknown gunmen in Quetta.

The Kharotabad Inquiry Report is a compiled judicial inquiry papers covering the prelude and causes of the police raid in Kharotabad area of Quetta, Balochistan province of Pakistan on 18 May 2011.

Inquiry papers concluded by Justice Mohammad Hashim Kakar of Balochistan High Court and were submitted to the Government of Pakistan over the prelude and events leading the Frontier Corps to open fire on five Russian citizens. After observing the papers of the events, Prime Minister Yousaf Gillani classified the reports and marked it restricted papers in 2011. No details of reports were made public by the government.

=== Synthesis and inquiry ===
In May 2011, the Balochistan Police, assisted by the Frontier Corps, opened fired on five Russian citizens who were travelling without a Pakistani visa and other immigration documents. Police officials earlier had claimed to have killed five "terrorists" on and were believed to be wearing suicide jackets, carrying weapons and about to attack a check post in Quetta.

Before the judicial probe, Chief Minister Aslam Raisani had constituted a committee under the supervision of Chief Secretary Balochistan Mir Bux Lehri to investigate the incident and submit a report within 10 hours. Lehri recommended a judicial probe covering all the federal and provincial employees who were involved in the incident.

As a result, Chief Minister Raisani formed a judicial tribunal comprising judges of the Balochistan High Court under the Balochistan Tribunals Inquiry Ordinance 1969. The papers were concluded under Justice Mohammad Hashim Kakar and duly submitted his report to Government of Pakistan over the cause of the incident.

=== Classified status ===
The papers were quickly and officially declared as government observed after going through the report that recommendations made by the judicial tribunal could not be fully implemented.

== See also ==
- War in North-West Pakistan
- 2011 Sindh Rangers shooting incident
