= Shahid (actor) =

Pakistani actor

- Born: Shahid Hameed; 24 July 1950 (age 76); Lahore, Punjab, Pakistan
- Occupation: Film actor
- Years active: 1971–1998, 2018–present
- Spouses: Munaza; Zamurrad (div.); Ishrat Chaudhary (div.); Babra Sharif (div.)
- Children: Kamran Shahid
- Relatives: Rao Farman Ali (cousin)
- Awards: Nigar Awards in 1974 and 1976

Shahid Hameed (Punjabi, Urdu: شاہِد حمِید), known simply as Shahid, is a Pakistani film actor who starred in many films of the 1970s and 1980s.

His first film was Aansoo, released in 1971. He worked in around 200 films.

== Early life and education ==
Shahid was born on 24 July 1950 in Lahore, Punjab, Pakistan. He hailed from a prosperous Punjabi Rajput family, which allowed him the freedom to pursue acting as a passion rather than a financial necessity. He had four sisters. Among the regular visitors to the family residence were the likes of Urdu poet Faiz Ahmad Faiz and Major-General Rao Farman Ali, his first cousin.

Shahid completed his early education in Lahore and later graduated from Punjab University.

== Career ==
=== 1971–1998 ===
Shahid began his acting career in 1970 when director Abbas Nosha cast him in the film Ek Raat. However, this film was never released. His proper debut came shortly afterward when S.A. Bukhari offered him a lead role in the film Aansoo (1971), where he portrayed a negative character named Nadeem. The film was both a critical and commercial success, opening the doors for Shahid in the film industry.

During the 1970s and 1980s, Shahid became one of the most sought-after actors in Pakistani cinema. He acted in nearly 300 films, covering a range of genres and character types. He starred opposite top heroines of the era, including Shabnam, Nisho, Sangeeta, Babra Sharif, and Deeba.

In 1972, he appeared in the classic film Umrao Jaan Ada, which is considered one of the landmark films of Pakistani cinema. His performance further solidified his standing as a leading actor. Other notable films include Shararat, Nehle Pe Dehla, Baharon Ki Manzil, Abhi To Main Jawan Hoon, Mere Huzoor, Shama-e-Mohabbat, Aah-e-Bewafa, Ishqash, Dil Aur Duniya, Dhanak, Deedar, Dekha Jaayega, Pyar Ka Gharana, Wada, Naukrewani Da Theka, Dehshat Khan, Jadoo, and Mirza Jat.

Shahid quit working in films as a result of sub-standard film production in Pakistan film industry after he worked Zor, directed by Syed Noor and released in 1998, where he played the character of Dawud, the movie's main antagonist.

=== 2018–present ===
Shahid made his comeback with film Wujood (2018), after a hiatus of 20 years.

== Personal life ==
Shahid has remained in the media spotlight due to his personal life. He married Begum Munaza, a woman from his extended family, but his name was often linked with scandals even after marriage. The couple has been blessed with three sons, Kamran, Imran and Zaheer; their son Kamran Shahid is a noted television journalist and anchor.

After his first marriage, Shahid also married three actresses Zamurrad, Ishrat Chaudhary and Babra Sharif but the marriages were unsuccessful. His 1977 marriage to Babra Sharif lasted only a couple of years.

== Awards and recognition ==
He was honored with multiple Nigar Awards and was dubbed the “savior of films” for his roles in salvaging struggling productions. He has also received recognition abroad, including honors from Canada.

- Nigar Award for Best Supporting Actor in film Deedar (1974)
- Nigar Award for Best Actor in film Shabana (1976)

== Selected filmography ==
Some of Shahid's notable movies include:

Selected filmography of Shahid Hameed
Year	Title	Language
1971	Yeh Aman	Urdu
1971	Tehzeeb	Urdu
1972	Umrao Jan Ada	Urdu
1972	Thah	Punjabi
1973	Baharon Ki Manzil	Urdu
1973	Anmol	Urdu
1974	Deedar	Urdu
1974	Naukar Wohti Da	Punjabi
1975	Bin Badal Barsaat	Urdu
1975	Tere Mere Sapne	Urdu
1975	Aik Gunnah Aur Sahi	Urdu
1975	Zeenat	Urdu
1976	Shabana	Urdu
1976	Suraiya Bhopali	Urdu
1977	Begum Jaan	Urdu
1977	Shama-e-Mohabbat	Urdu
1978	Seeta Maryam Margaret	Urdu
1979	Mr. Ranjha	Punjabi
1979	Khushboo	Urdu
1980	Aap Ki Khatir	Urdu
1980	Chotay Nawab	Urdu
1981	Bara Aadmi	Urdu
1982	Mirza Jat	Punjabi
1985	Do Hathkadian	Punjabi
1988	Chan Punjab Da	Punjabi
1998	Muhafiz	Urdu
2003	Shararat	Urdu
2018	Wajood	Urdu
2023	Huey Tum Ajnabi	Urdu

== See also ==
- List of Lollywood actors
