= Rishtay Kuch Adhooray Se =

Pakistani television series

- Title screen
- Also known as: Rishtey Kuch Adhooray Say
- Genre: Drama
- Written by: Nadia Akhtar
- Directed by: Farooq Rind
- Starring: Sohai Ali Abro; Yumna Zaidi; Ali Rehman Khan
- Opening theme: Rishtey Kuch Adhooray Se
- Composer: Khizar Idrees Baig
- Country of origin: Pakistan
- Original language: Urdu
- No. of episodes: 20

Production
- Producer: Momina Duraid
- Production locations: Karachi, Islamabad
- Editor: Alam Azeemi
- Running time: 40-45 mins (about 60 minutes with commercials)
- Production company: Momina Duraid Productions

Original release
- Network: Hum TV
- Release: 18 August – 29 December 2013

Rishtay Kuch Adhooray Se is a Pakistani drama serial broadcast on Hum TV that aired every Sunday at 8:00pm. It is directed by Farooq Rind and written by Nadia Akhtar. The series is produced by Momina Duraid, and the main cast includes Sohai Ali Abro, Yumna Zaidi and debutant Ali Rehman Khan with Irsa Ghazal, Mehmood Aslam and Jahanzeb Khan. The show aired between 18 August and 29 November 2013, with a total of 20 episodes.

== Plot ==
Gaiti and Kiran are two sisters with friendly relations. While Gaiti is closer to her mother, Kiran is loved more by her father. Their father is an extremely strict man who constantly insults his wife and blames her for everything that goes wrong, even when it is not in her control. He doesn't like his daughters socializing too much and engaging in shameful behaviour such as singing, dancing, or watching TV.

Gaiti tries to break the traditions and values of her family in her aspiration to be a singer like her ideal Rahat Fateh Ali Khan but her mom convinces her to get married as a really good rishta a very rich guy, named Arsal (who saw Gaiti in a friend's wedding and fell in love with her) has come for her. Problems arise in Arsal's house, when Aaliya's (Arsal's sister) husband tells Aaliya that she should stop Arsal's marriage as his sister loves him, and if she doesn't do so, he will divorce her.

Upon hearing that Rahat Fateh Ali Khan is coming to the city, Gaiti goes to audition for him, despite her mother requesting her multiple times not to do so. Meanwhile, Arsal's daadi falls very ill and insists that Arsal and Gaiti be married right away lest she should die. They all reach Gaiti's house for the Nikaah. Since Gaiti is away auditioning and her father doesn't know it, to save the respect of her husband and the family, Gaiti's mom (who is honestly just scared for herself because she doesn't want to face her husband and is being selfish) makes Kiran wear a dupatta which hides her face and sit in Gaiti's place.

This leads to a series of misunderstandings between the two sisters and their mother, with them all blaming each other for such a turn of events. Gaiti is possessive of Arsal while she feels guilty of his love and affection as he is still na-mehram for her while Kiran has started to fall in love with Arsal but keeps quiet due to her mom and sister. Gaiti's mom encourages her to somehow convince Arsal to do Nikaah with her again, but a religious leader tells Gaiti and her mom that this is violative of Islamic rules as technically, Arsal is already married to Kiran, so this Nikaah with Gaiti will not be valid (as one is not allowed to be simultaneously be married to two blood sisters). Gaiti and her mom hide this from Kiran to prevent her from going to Arsal or trying to claim her rights on him.

Gaiti's rukhsati happens and she comes to live at Arsal's house. Aaliya's husband divorces her due to Arsal's nikaah and marries someone else. So Aaliya and her mom start hating Gaiti. Things become even more complicated when Gaiti won't let Arsal touch her (as there was no Nikaah between them) and doesn't respond to any of his affections. Meanwhile, Kiran finds out that she is the one actually married to Arsal, and begins to create a rift between the two so she can claim her rights as his wife. So much so, that when Arsal's younger brother, Salar, falls in love with Kiran and confesses, she proclaims that she loves Arsal and has dedicated her entire life to him. Aaliya tries to use Kiran to kick Gaiti out of the house.

As the story progresses, many events occur which make their lives difficult. A drunk Arsal, frustrated and hurt from Gaiti's constant indifference, rapes Gaiti. Gaiti leaves the house and tells Arsal that she doesn't want to live with him, making Arsal's entire family and her own father misunderstand her. Through a letter that Kiran wrote and accidentally left at Arsal's house, Arsal finds out the truth about his Nikaah. He goes to Gaiti's house where, instead of meeting Gaiti, he asks Kiran whether she would like to live with him as his wife. Kiran's mother forces her to say no, leaving Kiran, who loves Arsal, depressed and Gaiti guilt-ridden that her sister has to make such a big sacrifice.

Both families, except for Gaiti's mother, are ecstatic when they discover that Gaiti is pregnant. Arsal is distraught as he cannot decide whether he should accept Kiran, his wife, or Gaiti, whose life will be ruined if he leaves her. Gaiti's mother is shocked as to the sin Gaiti and Arsal have committed by becoming intimate without Nikaah.

Soon, Arsal's daadi, who thinks that Kiran is trying to steal Arsal away from Gaiti, tells Gaiti's and Kiran's father that he should keep Kiran away from their house. In response, their father settles Kiran's marriage, her Nikaah to be performed two days later. Hearing this, Kiran tells her mother that she cannot marry as she is already married. She says that she will not be sacrificed again just to protect her mother from her father, her mother may sit in peace while her one daughter spends her entire life waiting for a man who can never accept her and her other daughter lives her entire life not being able to accept her husband. Their father hears all of this and finally knows the truth, but he leaves quietly without talking to any of them.

Finally understanding that she ruined both her daughters' lives just to save herself from her husband, Gaiti and Kiran's mother is guilt-ridden and commits suicide by shooting herself, leaving her husband and both her daughters devastated.

Arsal tells Kiran that he has truly loved Gaiti and has never felt this way about her, always considering her a younger sister. He says that it is Gaiti and not Kiran who is at fault so she should not be punished. He sets her free and asks her to move on in life.

Arsal leaves the city hoping to allow the sisters to move on. Some time later, Arsal comes back and finds Gaiti and proposes to her. The drama ends with the two uniting to finally complete their adhoora (incomplete) rishta (relationship).

== Cast ==
- Sohai Ali Abro as Gaiti Ara
- Yumna Zaidi as Kiran
- Ali Rehman Khan as Arsal
- Mehmood Aslam as Abdul Manaan, Gaiti Ara and Kiran's Father
- Irsa Ghazal as Jahan Ara, as Gaiti Ara and Kiran's Mother
- Jahanara Hai as Gaiti Ara and Kiran's grandmother
- Jahanzeb Khan as Salar, Arsal's Younger Brother
- Arjumand Rahim as Aaliya, Arsal's sister
- Mehmood Akhtar as Arsal's Father
- Seemi Pasha as Arsal's Mother

== Production ==
It marked the acting debut of Ali Rehman Khan.

== Critical reception ==
In an article of The Express Tribune, the author disapproved of the show's content, specifically the portrayal of an unmarried couple living together, which she found as contrary to social and cultural norms.
