= Shayad =

2017 Pakistani television series

- Genre: Love Story
- Written by: Faiza Iftikhar
- Directed by: Syed Ali Raza Usama
- Starring: Uzair Jaswal; Sadia Khan; Noman Ijaz; Kinza Razzak
- Country of origin: Pakistan
- Original language: Urdu
- No. of episodes: 21

Production
- Producer: Babar Javed
- Production location: Pakistan
- Running time: Approx 40 Minutes

Original release
- Network: Geo Entertainment
- Release: 4 November 2017 – 24 March 2018

Shayad (Urdu: شاید; transl. Perhaps) is a 2017 Pakistani drama serial directed by Bashar Momin director Syed Ali Raza Usama, produced by Babar Javed and written by Faiza Iftikhar, based on her novel of the same name. The drama stars Uzair Jaswal, Sadia Khan and Noman Ijaz in lead roles, and premiered on 4 November 2017 on Geo Entertainment. It was the second serial of singer-turned-actor Uzair Jaswal after Moray Saiyaan.

== Synopsis ==
Shayad depicts the story of a one-sided lover Saad, who has developed feelings for Umm-e-Hani. She is an orphan and lives with Saad and his parents.

Since being orphaned, Umm-e-Hani has always been in search of secure hands, a responsible man who can help her overcoming her insecurities and fulfill her wishes. She has always considered Saad an emotional, immature and boyish person. She finally meets Salaar, a strong and influential man who she believes is the man of her dreams.

Unfortunately, Umm-e-Hani's sensible and long-term decision spells trouble for her.

Will Saad's craziness and unconditional love towards Umm-e-Hani help him in finding her again in life?

== Cast ==
- Uzair Jaswal as Saad
- Sadia Khan as Umm-e-Hani (Hani)
- Noman Ijaz as Salaar
- Munazzah Arif as Naila
- Mohsin Gilani as Rizwan
- Irfan Khoosat as Dada
- Azra Aftab as Saalar Mother
- Haseeb Khan as Aslam
- Hareeb Farooque as Junaid
- Sofia Ahmed as Mahparha
- Farhana Maqsood as Salma
- Kinza Razzak as Taniya
- Wasim Haider as Sheharyar
- Saba Shahid as Anila
- Ali Mirza as Shoaib
- Samina Butt as Khala Batool

== Soundtrack ==
The original soundtrack of Shayad is composed by Syed Adeel Ali while the lyrics are provided by Ayub Khawar. The vocals are by Uzair Jaswal who is also the second lead actor of this drama serial. The song is available on Patari.
