= Ali Rehman Khan =

Pakistani actor

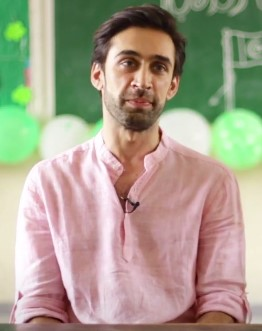
- Ali Rehman Khan in 2019
- Born: 6 May 1989 (age 37); Islamabad, Pakistan
- Education: University of London
- Occupation: Actor
- Years active: 2010–present

Ali Rehman Khan (Urdu: علی رحمان خان) is a Pakistani actor who appears in Urdu films, television series, and theater plays. Khan has won two Hum Awards and has been nominated twice at the Lux Style Awards for his acting prowess.

Born and raised in Islamabad, Khan pursued a bachelor's in business management from the University College of Islamabad and master's from the University of London. He made his acting debut with the road-comedy Gol Chakkar (2012) starring Hamza Aslam, Junaid and Jawad Jahangir and then starred in the romantic television drama Rishtay Kuch Adhooray Se (2013), which earned him wider recognition. He rose to prominence with starring roles in the television series, such as the romance Muhabbat Ab Nahi Hugi (2014) and the acclaimed family drama Diyar-e-Dil (2015).

Khan achieved further success by featuring in the commercially successful romantic comedies Janaan (2016), Parchi (2018) and Heer Maan Ja (2019), the first of these earned him the Lux Style Award for Best Supporting Actor nomination.

== Early life and education ==
Rehman was born in Islamabad, Islamabad Capital Territory, Pakistan on 6 May 1989. An ethnic Pashtun, his family roots lie in Lakki Marwat, Khyber Pakhtunkhwa. His father has worked as a diplomat, having served at the Pakistan embassy in Abu Dhabi and later at the consulate in Dubai.

He attended the University College of Islamabad and went on to receives his postgraduate degree in Business Management from the University of London. Before making acting his professional career he worked with United Nations organizations such as World Health Organization and UNICEF, specializing in questions related to migration and refugees, later hired as a consultant for some four years at the International Centre for Migration Policy Development in Vienna, Austria.

== Career ==
=== Theatre and cinema ===
Rehman began working as a theater actor in 2004. He made his film debut with Slackistan in 2010 followed by the comedy-drama Gol Chakkar in 2012. Both films are still unreleased; Slackistan was banned by Central Board of Film Censors (CBFC), Pakistan due to strong language and dialogue. Gol Chakkar was ultimately approved and was screened in October 2012. He was then cast in the romantic-comedy film Janaan with fellow television actors Bilal Ashraf and Armeena Khan. The film was released on 13 September 2016, in theaters and garnered him praise as well as the Lux Style Award for Best Supporting Actor nomination.

=== Television ===
He made his acting debut in television with a leading role in the Hum TV's romantic drama series Rishtay Kuch Adhooray Se in 2013. He then starred in the 2014 drama serial Muhabbat Ab Nahi Hugi. He played Suhaib Bakhtiyar Khan in his third drama serial Diyar-e-Dil which was premiered on 17 March 2015, along with Hareem Farooq, Meekal Zulfiqar and Sanam Saeed. In 2023, he was noted for playing an intersex character in the drama Guru.

== Filmography ==
=== Films ===
Year	Serial	Role	Director	Notes
2010	Slackistan	Sherry	Hammad Khan	Debut
2012	Gol Chakkar	Candy Bhai	Shahbaz Shigri	
2016	Janaan	Daniyal Khan	Azfar Jafri	
2018	Parchi	Bash	Azfar Jafri	
2019	Heer Maan Ja	Kabeer	Azfar Jafri	
2022	Parde Mein Rehne Do	Shani	Wajahat Rauf	
2023	Money Back Guarantee	Haider	Faisal Qureshi	Special appearance
2024	Daghabaaz Dil	Faris	Wajahat Rauf	

=== Television series ===
Year	Title	Role	Network	Ref(s)
2013	Rishtay Kuch Adhooray Se	Arsal	Hum TV	
2014	Muhabbat Ab Nahi Hugi	Aazar	Hum TV	
2015	Diyar-e-Dil	Suhaib Bakhtiyar Khan	Hum TV	
2018	Main Khayal Hoon Kisi Aur Ka	Zaryab Safdar	Hum TV	
2019	Khaas	Ammar Saud	Hum TV	
2019	Bewafa	Ahaan	ARY Digital	
2021	Safar Tamam Howa	Sami	Hum TV	
2021	Laapata	Shams	Hum TV	
2021	Bebasi	Ahmer	Hum TV	
2021	Sinf-e-Aahan	Kumail	ARY Digital	
2022	Badshah Begum	Bakhtiar	Hum TV	
2022	Meri Shehzadi	Shehroz	Hum TV	
2023	Guru	Sattar/Guru	Express Entertainment	
2023	Mannat Murad	Hammad	Geo Entertainment	
2024	Noor Jahan	Safeer Shah	ARY Digital	
2024	Pas E Deewar	Shabbir	Green Entertainment	
2025	Sauda	Noman	Express Entertainment	
2025	Case No. 9	Ali	Geo Entertainment	
2025	Meri Zindagi Hai Tu	Khawar	ARY Digital	

== Awards and nominations ==
Year	Award	Category	Work	Result	Ref.
2014	2nd Hum Awards	Best Television Sensation	Rishtay Kuch Adhooray Se	Won	
2015	3rd Hum Awards	Best Actor - Jury	Muhabbat Ab Nahi Hugi	Nominated	
2015	3rd Hum Awards	Best Actor - Popular	Muhabbat Ab Nahi Hugi	Nominated	
2016	4th Hum Awards	Best Supporting Actor	Diyar-e-Dil	Won	
2016	4th Pakistan Media Awards	Best Supporting Actor	Diyar-e-Dil	Nominated	
2016	Pakistan Media Awards	Best Supporting Actor	Janaan	Nominated	
2016	ARY Film Awards	Best Supporting Actor	Janaan	Nominated	
2017	16th Lux Style Awards	Best Supporting Actor	Janaan	Nominated	
2018	3rd Hum Style Awards	Most Stylish Film Actor	Parchi	Won	
2023	1st Kya Drama Hai Icon Awards	Best Actor (Critics Choice)	Guru	Nominated	
2025	2nd Kya Drama Hai Icon Awards	Best Supporting Actor (Popular Choice)	Noor Jahan	Nominated	

== See also ==
- List of Lollywood actors
