= Slackistan =

- سلیکستان
- Directed by: Hammad Khan
- Written by: Hammad Khan; Shandana Ayub
- Produced by: Hammad Khan
- Starring: Shahbaz Hamid Shigri; Aisha Linnea Akthar; Ali Rehman Khan; Shahana Khan Khalil; Osman Khalid Butt; Khalid Saeed; Rafey Alam
- Edited by: Hammad Khan
- Production company: Big Upstairs Films
- Distributed by: Big Upstairs Films; Stealth Films
- Release date: May 2010 (Cannes)
- Running time: 89
- Country: Pakistan
- Language: English
- Box office: Rs. 0.20 crore (US$7,200)

Slackistan is an independent film directed by London-based filmmaker, Hammad Khan, and written by Khan and his wife, Shandana Ayub. The film stars Shahbaz Hamid Shigri, Aisha Linnea Akhtar, Ali Rehman Khan, Shahana Khan Khalil, Osman Khalid Butt, Khalid Saeed, and Rafey Alam. The film is distributed by Big Upstairs Films.

Inspired by the Richard Linklater's 1991 film Slacker, Slackistan debuted (first 10 minutes) at the 63rd Cannes Film Festival in the Marche du Film section. It was also screened at a number of festivals, in such locations as London, Abu Dhabi, New York City, San Francisco, and Goa. It was banned in Pakistan.

== Premise ==
A young man in his early twenties juggles his dreams to be a filmmaker with his family life, his best friend's troubles, the girl he's interested in, and living in Pakistan during political turmoil.

== Cast ==
- Shahbaz Hamid Shigri as Hasan
- Aisha Linnea Akhtar as Aisha
- Ali Rehman Khan as Sherry
- Shahana Khan Khalil as Zara
- Osman Khalid Butt as Saad
- Khalid Saeed as Mani
- Rafey Alam as Zeeshan
- Adil Omar as himself
- Uzair Jaswal as himself

== Production ==
The film was shot in Islamabad over a period of three weeks in April 2009. Locations included various popular spots around the city, including F-10 Markaz, F-8 Markaz, Daman-e-Koh, Gol Market F-7/3, and some local parks.

The cast was a relatively unknown one, consisting of local theatre actors in their 20s who essentially play themselves. Shahbaz Shigri used his own car for the shooting, while Aisha Linnea Akhtar allowed her own room to be used for some scenes. Houses were borrowed from friends of the cast and crew to keep the costs as low as possible. According to Shigri, the film was "made in a way that an indie would be made" – without a proper script, budget, permission, and with a modest crew.

== Controversy ==
Slackistan has not been released in Pakistan because the director refused to make cuts to the film as requested by the country's Central Board of Film Censors (CBFC) on 25 January 2011. According to The Guardian, the CBFC objects to the movie because it has swear words in English and Urdu, and "contains the words 'Taliban' and 'lesbian'". Scenes showing characters drinking (fake alcohol for the filming, incidentally) and a joke about beards (as in, 'my beard is longer than your beard') made between characters talking hypothetically about a fancy dress party. These are not the CBFC's only objections, but the main ones it has highlighted." The CBFC have also stated that, even if all cuts are made as demanded, the film would still receive a restrictive adults-only ‘18+’ rating."

In a press release, director Hammad Khan stated “The censor board’s verdict is oppressive, arbitrary and steeped in denial about life outside their government offices. Maybe the establishment’s view is that young Pakistanis saying words like 'Taliban' and 'Lesbian' represent potent threat.

Members of the Slackistan cast have publicly expressed their disagreement with the CBFC's decision. “This objection honestly reinforces the feeling of being voiceless that seems to be lingering in the country these days. We really are stripped of our basic right to express ourselves,” actress Shahana Khan Khalil said. “I also find it highly hypocritical for our cinemas to be allowed to show both Hollywood and Bollywood films that depict everything and a lot more are never banned by the censor board.” Actor Shahbaz Shigri said, “We [in Pakistan] haven’t developed the ability to scrutinize ourselves. We point fingers at others rather than correcting ourselves. We don’t laugh at ourselves. This limits our film industry and young film makers that will never get through to the right channels.”

The CBFC's own website states that it prevents the public exhibition of films that break certain vague rules, which include "giving offense to any section of the public or injured the feelings of any class of persons" or "ridiculing, disparaging or attacking any religious sect caste and creed."

== Music ==
The original soundtrack consists of music by The Kominas, Mole, Zerobridge, The Fatsumas, and others. An official track list is yet to be announced.
