= Bahar-e Sofla =

Bahar-e Sofla بهارسفلي
- Village
- Location within Iran
- Coordinates: 36°53′46″N 58°09′21″E
- Country: Iran
- Province: North Khorasan
- County: Faruj
- Bakhsh: Central
- Rural District: Sangar

Population (2006)
  - Total: 124
- Time zone: UTC+3:30 (IRST)
  - Summer (DST): UTC+4:30 (IRDT)

Bahar-e Sofla (Persian: بهارسفلي, Romanized as Bahār-e Soflá; also known as Bahār-e Pā’īn), is a village in Sangar Rural District. It is located in the Central District of Faruj County, North Khorasan Province, Iran. At the 2006 census, its population was 124 in 38 families.
