= Salah Al Bahar =

Iraqi singer and composer

Salah al Bahar
- Birth name: Salah Bahr Daway Al-Tameemi
- Born: 3 February 1972 (age 53); Baghdad, Iraq
- Origin: Iraq
- Genres: Pop
- Occupation(s): Singer, composer
- Instrument(s): Vocals, lute
- Years active: 1994–present
- Website: www.instagram.com/salah_albaharr/

Salah Al Bahar (Arabic;صلاح البحر), born 1970) is an Iraqi singer and composer.

== Biography ==
Born in Baghdad in 1970, Salah started his musical career by composing songs for various Iraqi singers. He expanded his career, moving on to singing, after participating in the Amateur Corner program for Iraqi talent in 1994 and was able to succeed in the program. Following his participation in the program he produced his first song.

=== 1992–present ===
Salah recorded 18 more successful musical albums and shot more than 117 music videos.

== Discography ==
Sources

- 1994 – Wun Treed Biaa
- 1995 – Soutk Ana
- 1996 – Mlit Ana
- 1997 – Aker Zaman
- 2000 – Manasekm
- 2001 – Ank Yardony
- 2002 – Alkatry
- 2003– Entahena
- 2004 – Anh Wleel
- 2005 – Dkoo Alkashb
- 2008 – Ma Mrtah
- 2013 – Haram
- 2015 – Nadam
- 2017 – Aksr Alkatr
- 2018 – Asteheet
- 2018 – Shasawelh
