= Bahar, Tehran =

Neighborhood in Tehran, Iran

Coordinates: 35°25′36″N 51°25′36″E

Bahar (Persian: بهار, "spring") is a neighborhood area in Tehran, Iran. The name is taken from the name of the street that runs from Enqalab to Bahar-e-Shirazi.

== History ==
Formed in the 1920s, Bahar is home to a multicultural cross-section of Tehran society, including large numbers of Azerbaijanis, Iranian Turks, Assyrians and Armenians; this ethnic blend remains an integral part of the area's cultural fabric. Before the Iranian Revolution the area was considered an upper-middle class part of Tehran. However, during the revolution the area saw many purges of property seized by the revolutionary forces. In more recent times, Bahar has become one of the favored central areas of the city, with close access to Haft-e-Tir metro station.

== Modern Day ==
Over the past twenty years Bahar's population has increased five times its original plan, partly due to the destroying of its original villas. The original properties are mostly in minority now with modern apartment blocks housing at least five apartments becoming the norm.

In the past decade Bahar has also seen an increase in commercial activity, with two small malls opening along the main street. It has also seen a drastic shift in the makeup of its commercial properties with many of the original store making way for more food outlets and children's clothing stores.

== Urban planning ==
The area changed and became a part of urban Tehran in the 1940s, when the original villas were demolished for the development of multi-unit apartment buildings. Many street names in the area were changed multiple times. Many of the streets east of Bahar had been named after Shah Mohammad Reza Pahlavi's family. After the Islamic Revolution, street names changed to reflect the losses of the young men who fought in the Iran–Iraq War.

== Traffic ==
Bahar St, a major thoroughfare in the area, was originally a two-way street, but in recent years was turned into a one-way street. Traffic runs northward in the direction of Haft-e-Tir Square to the west and Bahar-e-Shirazi to the north. As the road is generally narrow by modern Tehran standards, it is often very busy with traffic.

Many side roads in the area now come under Tehran Municipality's traffic scheme with cameras and police patrolling the area stopping cars not permitted to enter the area.

== Shopping ==
Bahar Street is home to businesses that include children's clothing shops and plumbing wholesalers towards the south and centre of the area. The north offers a combination of delis, restaurants, cafes, general household shops and pastry shops.

== Festivals ==
The Bahar area promotes both Muslim and Christian festivities. Towards Christmas, Bahar St is home to Armenian shops selling decorations and Christmas trees. During the festival of Nouruz, the shops promote new items for residents to redecorate their homes for the coming of the new year.

== Schools and Associations ==
Bahar hosts Faragiran School, Rostam Armenian School and the Armenian Social Center.

== Hospitals ==
Arad General Hospital, Sajjad Hospital, Iran Shahr, and Tehran 502 Military Hospital are all located in the Bahar area.
