= Kamran Shahid =

Pakistani television anchor and journalist

- کامران شاہِد
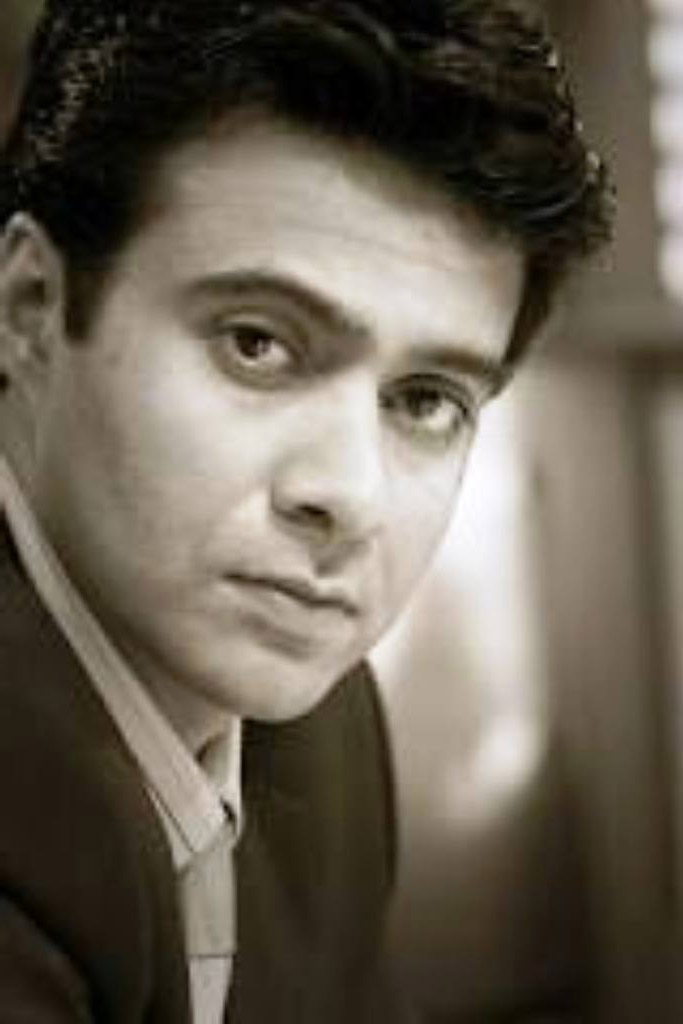
- Born: 20 September 1975 (age 50); Lahore, Punjab, Pakistan
- Education: University of Westminster; Government College University
- Occupation: TV News anchor
- Television: On The Front with Kamran Shahid
- Father: Munaza Shahid & Shahid

Kamran Shahid (Punjabi, Urdu: کامران شاہِد) is a Pakistani journalist, TV anchor person, academic, and author. He is the main news anchor for the TV show On The Front with Kamran Shahid on Dunya News.

== Early life and education ==
Kamran Shahid belongs to a Punjabi Rajput family. He was born in Lahore, Punjab, Pakistan. His father is the well known Pakistani film actor of the 1970s and the 1980s Shahid Hameed, while his mother, Munaza Shahid, studied at Kinnaird College for Women, Lahore, Pakistan and has been an academic.

Kamran Shahid received his master's degree in Modern History from Government College University, Lahore. He holds a degree in International Relations from the University of Westminster, London. He has presented his research papers at different international forums.

== Career ==
=== Academia ===
For 10 years, he taught at Punjab University, Lahore and Quaid-i-Azam University, Islamabad.

=== Television journalism ===
Kamran Shahid began his career in television journalism from PTV. As a current affairs television anchor, Shahid has produced a variety of programs, including socio-political and current affairs talk shows, documentaries, docu-dramas, and investigative reports. Shahid has also conducted one-on-one interviews with many leading personalities including international dignitaries.

Kamran Shahid now leads the flagship show at Pakistani TV channel Dunya News —On the Front which is a tri-weekly news program based on current-affairs and issues related to politics and socio-economic demographics. Before this TV show, he used to be an anchor person on Pakistani TV channel Express News TV show Frontline with Kamran Shahid. He was a guest speaker for the Oxford University - (Pakistan Society) at Oxfordshire County Hall during Pakistan Young Leaders Conference in February 2011.

=== Cinema ===
In 2023, he entered the Pakistani film industry by directing a movie Huey Tum Ajnabi.

== Books ==
- Gandhi and the Partition of India: A New Perspective, Lahore : Ferozsons, 2005, 124 p.
- International Relations & Political Theory, Lahore : Ferozsons, 2006, 235 p.

== Filmography ==
Year	Film	Director	Producer	Screenwriter	References
2023	Huey Tum Ajnabi	Yes	Yes	Yes	
