= 2011 Pakistan Rangers shooting incident =

Terrorist incident in Pakistan

The 2011 Sindh Rangers shooting incident was a controversial incident regarding the fatal shooting of a 22-year-old Pakistani citizen Sindghari Sarfraz Shah by Sindh Division of the Pakistan Rangers.

== Incident ==
Sarfaraz Shah, was shot by members of the Sindh branch of the Pakistan Rangers in Karachi in 2011. The incident was recorded by a local television cameraman, Abdul Salam Somroo. After the channel he worked for, Samaa TV, refused to air the footage, Somroo had the footage broadcast on another Pakistani national channel. After the footage of the incident spread, other media companies, national and international, aired the footage as well. The cameraman left Karachi with his family after receiving numerous threats. The video shows Sarfaraz Shah in a black T-shirt being dragged by his hair in a public park by a man in plain clothes. He was then pushed towards a group of uniformed Rangers disembarking from a pick-up truck, one of them approaching him aggressively, armed with G3 battle rifles. Shah, who did not appear to be armed, pleaded for his life as one of the Rangers pointed a gun at his neck. The Ranger then shot him twice at close range with the rifle and hit him in the thigh and arm. Shah can be seen writhing on the ground, screaming in pain, bleeding heavily, and begging for help as the video ends (he is not taken to hospital by the rangers). He died of blood loss.

== Aftermath ==
Shortly after the incident it was not clear who made the video, which led to some reports suggesting that the cameraman had gone into hiding. The incident sparked public outcry, especially in Shah's local area, with some politicians calling for the Rangers involved to be prosecuted.

The Rangers and park employees alleged that the young man had been caught trying to rob someone, which Shah's family denies. His brother, Salik Shah, said Sarfaraz had been the victim of an extrajudicial killing, saying "My innocent brother has been killed brutally by the Rangers." and "What harm has he inflicted on anybody? His crime was that he was just strolling in the public park because there was no power in the house." A later investigation revealed that a toy gun was recovered from the victim.

The whole episode was also recorded incidentally by the crew of a Sindhi TV channel, Awaz Television Network. They were at the Benazir Shaheed Public Park, Clifton near the American Consulate in Karachi, at around 5:30 pm, recording their program "Walk & Talk". Someone claimed to be a security guard at the park and brought Shah to the Rangers who drove a white-coloured vehicle numbered 1543. The Rangers appeared to be "hyper", and their physical and mental condition could not be ascertained by an independent medical examination, as they were taken into "protective" custody by their own comrades. They were handed over to the Police after 2 days, by which time it was no longer possible to examine the mental state of the Rangers at the time of the incident.

Ali Dayan Hasan, the Pakistani researcher for Human Rights Watch, said the killing "provides chilling evidence of the abusive, trigger-happy practices of Pakistan's military, paramilitary and civilian agencies". Ajaz Chaudhry of the DG Rangers claimed that an inquiry would be underway and those responsible would be brought to justice. Iftakhar Ahmad Chouhdary, the chief Justice of Pakistan, transferred the case to the court of anti-terrorism.

Also shortly after the incident, the chief of the Sindh Rangers, Fayaaz Leghari, was fired from his post by the Pakistani Government on orders of the Supreme Court. The chief Inspector General of the Sindh Police who allegedly misconducted the investigation was also fired from his post.

Shahid Zafar, the Ranger who shot Sarfaraz Shah, was convicted of murder in the Sindh High Court where he was later sentenced to death after being found guilty of the offence. The Ranger and his lawyer later appealed the verdict in the Supreme Court of Pakistan which upheld the death sentence against the accused upon reviewing the case, while punishments for others involved were adjusted.

The Government authorities has petitioned the President of Pakistan for pardoning all the accused under the Article 45 of the Constitution. It was reported in some sections of the media that the pardon has been granted, but was refuted by the President's office.
