= Bahara, Uttar Pradesh =

Bahara is a village in Khutahan, Jaunpur district, Varanasi division, Uttar Pradesh, India.
