= Baharak =

Baharak may refer to:

- Baharak District, Badakhshan, Afghanistan
- Baharak District, Takhar, Afghanistan
