= Bahareh, Fars =

Bahareh بهاره
- Village
- Location within Iran
- Coordinates: 29°23′06″N 52°10′46″E
- Country: Iran
- Province: Fars
- County: Shiraz
- Bakhsh: Arzhan
- Rural District: Kuh Mareh Sorkhi

Population (2006)
  - Total: 40
- Time zone: UTC+3:30 (IRST)
  - Summer (DST): UTC+4:30 (IRDT)

Bahareh (Persian: بهاره, also Romanized as Bahāreh; also known as Bahārā) is a village in Kuh Mareh Sorkhi Rural District, Arzhan District, Shiraz County, Fars province, Iran. At the 2006 census, its population was 40, in 6 families.
