= Gol Chakkar =

Pakistani comedy film

- Film poster
- Directed by: Shahbaz Shigri; Aisha Linnea
- Written by: Aisha Linnea Akhtar
- Produced by: Aisha Linnea Akhtar
- Production company: InCahoot Films
- Release date: October 2012
- Country: Pakistan
- Language: Urdu

Gol Chakkar is a 2012 Pakistani comedy film directed by Shahbaz Shigri, produced and written by Aisha Linnea Akhtar. Film features Ali Rehman Khan,Usman Mukhtar, Salmaan Ahmed Shaukat, Uzair Jaswal, Adil Gul, Saboor Pasha, Asad Ali Shigri and special appearance by Shahana Khan Khalil. This film is a sequel to Sole Search on the life of a character Candy Bhai from the earlier version. Candy Bhai, along with some new characters, gets into trouble when the boys decide to head over to Rawalpindi.

== Synopsis ==
A gang of fun-loving hooligans or Jinnah Boys find themselves in trouble when they cross paths with a small-time gangster from the other side of the tracks.

== Cast ==
- Ali Rehman Khan
- Usman Mukhtar as Shera
- Uzair Jaswal
- Salmaan Ahmed Shaukat
- Asad Ali Shigri
- Adil Gul
- Saboor Pasha
- Shahana Khan Khalil
- Waqas

== Soundtrack ==
The soundtrack includes Pindi Express Adil Omar and also features additional vocals by Usman Mukhtar in character as Shera.

== Release ==
Theatrical trailer was released in September 2012 and the movie was screened in October 2012.
