= Waqas Ahmed =

Waqas Ahmed may refer to:

- Waqas Ahmed (Norwegian cricketer) (born 1991)
- Waqas Ahmed (cricketer, born 1979), Pakistani cricketer
- Waqas Ahmed (cricketer, born 1992), Pakistani cricket coach and former cricketer
- Waqas Ahmed (cricketer, born 1989), Pakistani cricketer
- Waqas Ahmed, Pakistani criminal; perpetrator of the 2012 Paros beating and rape
- Waqas Ahmed, Pakistani journalist, author and editor of Daily Pakistan (Global)
- Waqas Ahmed, British interdisciplinary scholar, author of 2018 non-fiction book The Polymath
