= Arpunk =

Village in Gegharkunik, Armenia

Arpunk Արփունք
- Location within Armenia Location within Gegharkunik
- Coordinates: 40°17′21″N 45°44′15″E
- Country: Armenia
- Province: Gegharkunik
- Municipality: Vardenis
- Elevation: 2,050 m (6,730 ft)

Population (2011)
  - Total: 568
- Time zone: UTC+4 (AMT)
- Postal code: 1607

Arpunk (Armenian: Արփունք; Azerbaijani: Kəsəmən) is a village in the Vardenis Municipality of the Gegharkunik Province of Armenia. Three kilometers southeast of the village is a 15th-century church. The village was populated by Azerbaijanis before the exodus of Azerbaijanis from Armenia after the outbreak of the Nagorno-Karabakh conflict. In 1988-1989 Armenian refugees from Azerbaijan settled in the village.

== Toponymy ==
The village was known as Bahar until 1978.

== Notable people ==
- Aladdin Allahverdiyev (born 1947), Soviet, Russian and Azerbaijani scientist, professor (2001)
