= Vinah, Kermanshah =

Vinah وينه
- Village
- Location within Iran
- Coordinates: 33°55′00″N 47°14′00″E
- Country: Iran
- Province: Kermanshah
- County: Kermanshah
- Bakhsh: Firuzabad
- Rural District: Osmanvand

Population (2006)
  - Total: 206
- Time zone: UTC+3:30 (IRST)
  - Summer (DST): UTC+4:30 (IRDT)

Vinah (Persian: وينه, also Romanized as Vīnah; also known as Bahārān and Vīneh-ye Bahārān) is a village in Osmanvand Rural District, Firuzabad District, Kermanshah County, Kermanshah Province, Iran. At the 2006 census, its population was 206, in 44 families.
