= Baharon Ki Manzil (1973 film) =

1973 film

- Film poster
- Directed by: S. Suleman
- Written by: Agha Hassan Imtisal
- Produced by: Azam J. Irani
- Starring: Sangeeta; Shahid; Tariq Aziz; Talish; Sabiha Khanum
- Cinematography: Ali Jan
- Music by: Nashad
- Distributed by: Al-Falah Pictures
- Release date: 1973
- Country: Pakistan
- Language: Urdu

Baharon Ki Manzil is a 1973 Pakistani film directed by S. Suleman.

Music was composed by the renowned music director Nashad and film song lyrics were written by Taslim Fazli. This film failed at the box-office.

== Cast ==
- Sangeeta
- Shahid
- Sabiha Khanum
- Tariq Aziz
- Talish
- Nanha
- Irfan Khoost
- Zarqa
- Hanif
- Naini
- Chakram
- Tani
- Kemal Irani

== Soundtrack ==
- Andaz-e-Karam Jab Aisa Hay.. (Urdu)

Singer(s): Ahmad Rushdi Music: Nashad, Poet: Taslim Fazli, Actor(s): Shahid

- Baharon Ki Manzil Bata Denay Waly.. (Urdu)

Singer(s): Noorjahan Music: Nashad, Poet: Taslim Fazli, Actor(s): Sangeeta

- Chehray Peh Banawat Ka Ghusa, Ankhon Mein Chhalkata.. (Urdu)

Singer(s): Mala Music: Nashad, Poet: Taslim Fazli, Actor(s): Sangeeta

- Chehray Peh Banawat Ka Ghusa, Ankhon Mein Chhalkata.. (Urdu)

Singer(s): Ahmad Rushdi Music: Nashad, Poet: Taslim Fazli, Actor(s): Shahid

- Door Ham Tujh Say Ho Geye Leikan.. (Urdu)

Singer(s): Noorjahan Music: Nashad, Poet: Taslim Fazli, Actor(s): Sangeeta

- Mera Khayal Bhi Hazoor Kar Lein.. (Urdu)

Singer(s): Mala Music: Nashad, Poet: ?, Actor(s): Sangeeta

- Sham Hui, Janay Day, Chhor Meri Behna.. (Urdu)

Singer(s): Noorjahan, Rajab Ali Music: Nashad, Poet: Taslim Fazli, Actor(s): Sangeeta, Shahid

- Tu Pyar Lay Kay Aya, Main Bahar Ban Geyi.. (Urdu)

Singer(s): Mala, Masood Rana
