= Bahar Movahed Bashiri =

Iranian orthodontist, cartoonist, and singer

Bahar Movahed Bashiri (Persian: بهار موحد بشیری) is a board certified orthodontist, renowned cartoonist, and Persian classical vocalist.

== Biography ==
Bahar was born in Tehran, Iran. She was raised in an environment which harmonized art and science; her father is a nationally recognized surgeon and her mother is a well-known artist in Iran. Bahar started learning music as a young child first on the piano. Later on, she learned how to play the tanbour through lessons with Maestro Seyed Amrollah Shah Ebrahimi. She quickly developed an interest for Kurdish lyrics and classical Persian vocal radifs. Simultaneously she learned to play Tar with Keyvan Saket and Mohamad Reza Ebrahimi and began intense vocal training in 1998 with the acclaimed classical Iranian singer Mrs. Parissa. During this period, Bahar was a dedicated dental student and went on to earn her DDS degree in Iran in 2003 from Tehran Azad School of Dentistry. While practicing as a dentist, she continued studying vocals with renowned Iranian vocalists Shahram Nazeri and Hamid Reza Noorbakhsh, and eventually the legendary Mohammad-Reza Shajarian. In her free time, she taught at a number of music institutes and recorded her own music before she left Iran.

In 2010, Bahar immigrated to the United States to further education and pursue professional opportunities. Since women in Iran are only allowed to perform and produce music as "co-singing" vocalists to mask their own voice, Bahar was eager to present her art in the U.S. as a solo vocalist. In 2012, she released her debut album in collaboration with Maestro Ali Akbar Moradi, a well-known Iranian-Kurdish tanbour virtuoso. The album Goblet of Eternal Light was published by Traditional Crossroads and U.S. media deemed it "one of the most hauntingly beautiful albums of the year in any style of music". To date, Bahar has held multiple sold-out concerts across the US.

Bahar continued her dentistry education in the U.S. and earned her second DDS degree from the University of California, San Francisco. Soon after, she gained a specialty in Orthodontics and a MS in Kinesiology at the Arizona School of Dentistry and Oral Health. Bahar is currently practicing orthodontics in Southern California. While her career as an orthodontist brings her joy, her endless passion for Persian classical singing can not be quenched. Her well-rounded background has given her media recognition as a "Renaissance Woman".

== Caricature exhibitions ==
- International Caricature Exhibition, Piracicaba, Brazil, 2008n and 2011
- Golden Smile International Annual Cartoon Exhibition, Serbia, 2006
- FCW International Cartoon and Animation Festival, China, 2005
- International IACC Cartoon Festival, China, 2004
- Exhibition at Stoa, the Cultural Centre of Eastern Helsinki, Finland, 2004
- Tolentino International Cartoon Festival, Italy, 1999 and 2003
- Solo Exhibition at Iran House of Cartoon, Tehran, Iran, 2000

== Awards ==
- First Prize and Gold medal, 5th International FCW Cartoon Festival, China, 2005
- Special Prize, 1st International IACC Animation & Cartoon Festival, China, 2004
- Honorary Diploma and Special Medal, 22nd Tolentino International Caricature Festival, Italy, 2003

== Music albums ==
- "Goblet of Eternal Light", Published by Traditional Crossroads, New York, 2012
- "Sarkhaneh", Composition in the Ancient Iranian Music Styles, Published by Mahoor Institute of Culture and Art, Iran, 2010
- Motion picture score "Mando", 2009
- The piece "Moses & the Shepherd", With Ukraine National Orchestra accompanying, Conductor: Vladimir Sirenko, 2007
- Motion picture score "Among the Clouds", 2007
- Motion picture score "Bare-foot in Paradise", 2006

== Concerts ==
- "Neishapur Nights", Town Hall Seattle, May 2017
- "Iran Through centuries", Town Hall Seattle, March 2015
- "The art of Persian ballad from past to present", Berkeley City College Auditorium, Berkeley, May 2013
- "World Music Institute Concert", Leonard Nimoy Symphony Space, Broadway (New York), April 2013
- The Concert of "Nowruz", Museum of Fine Arts, Boston, March 2012
- The Concert of "Goriz" (Escape), Farhangsaraye honar (Tehran), September 2007

== Dental publications ==
=== Translated into Persian ===
- Medical Emergencies in the Dental office, 6th Edition, Stanley F. Malamed, Shayan Nemoodar Publishing House, 2009.
- Medical Emergencies in the Dental office, 5th Edition, Stanley F. Malamed, Shayan Nemoodar Publishing House, 2006.
- Essential Handbook of Local Anesthesia, A translation and summary of Handbook of Local Anesthesia, 5th Edition, Stanley F. Malamed, Shayan Nemoodar Publishing House, 2004.
