= Kakhakn =

Village in Gegharkunik, Armenia

Kakhakn Կախակն
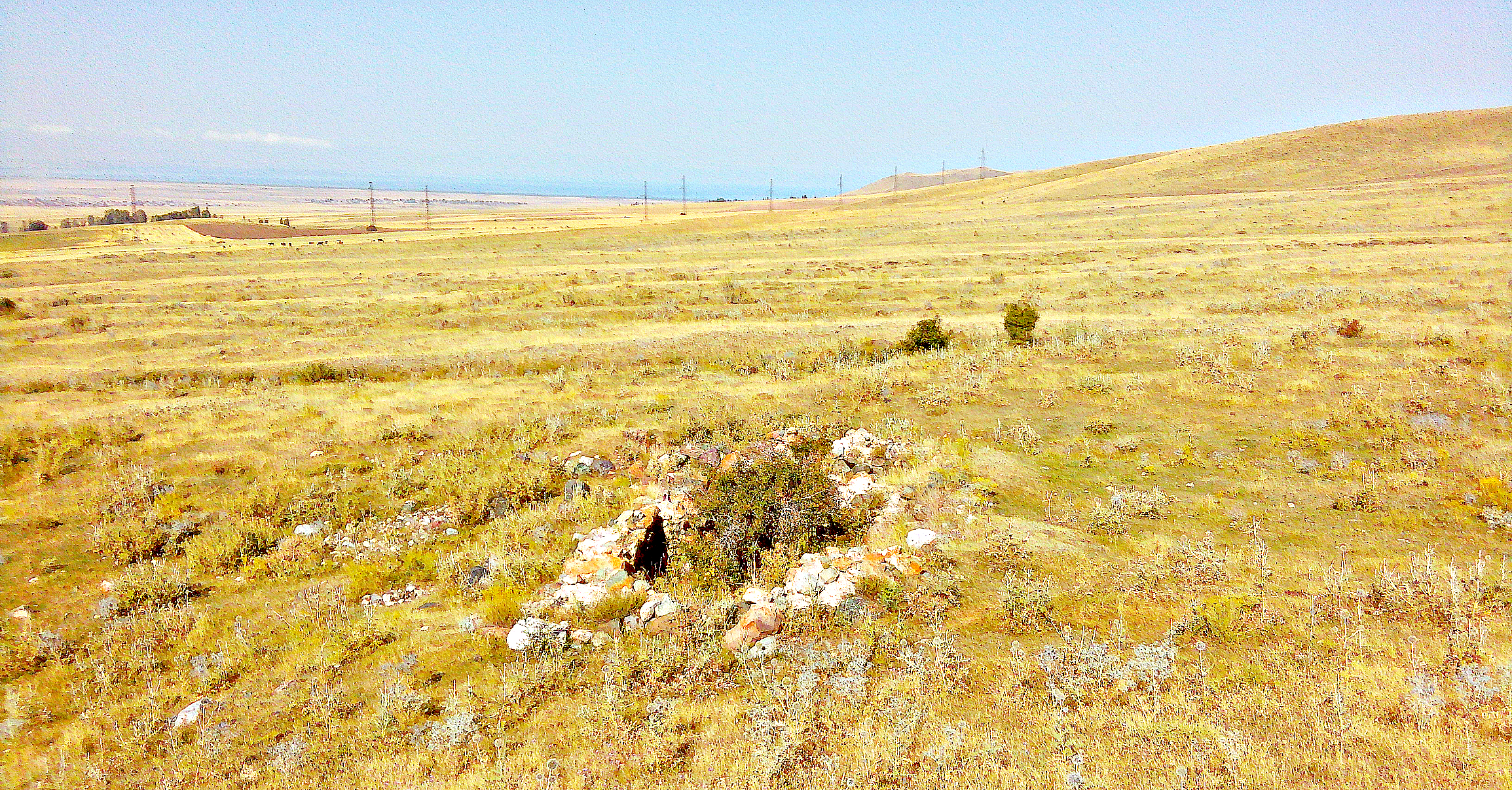
- Scenery around the village

- Location within Armenia Location within Gegharkunik
- Coordinates: 40°17′N 45°47′E
- Country: Armenia
- Province: Gegharkunik
- Municipality: Vardenis

Population (2011)
  - Total: 375
- Time zone: UTC+4 (AMT)

Kakhakn (Armenian: Կախակն) is a village in the Vardenis Municipality of the Gegharkunik Province of Armenia.

== History ==
The village has 13th-16th century khachkars.

== Gallery ==
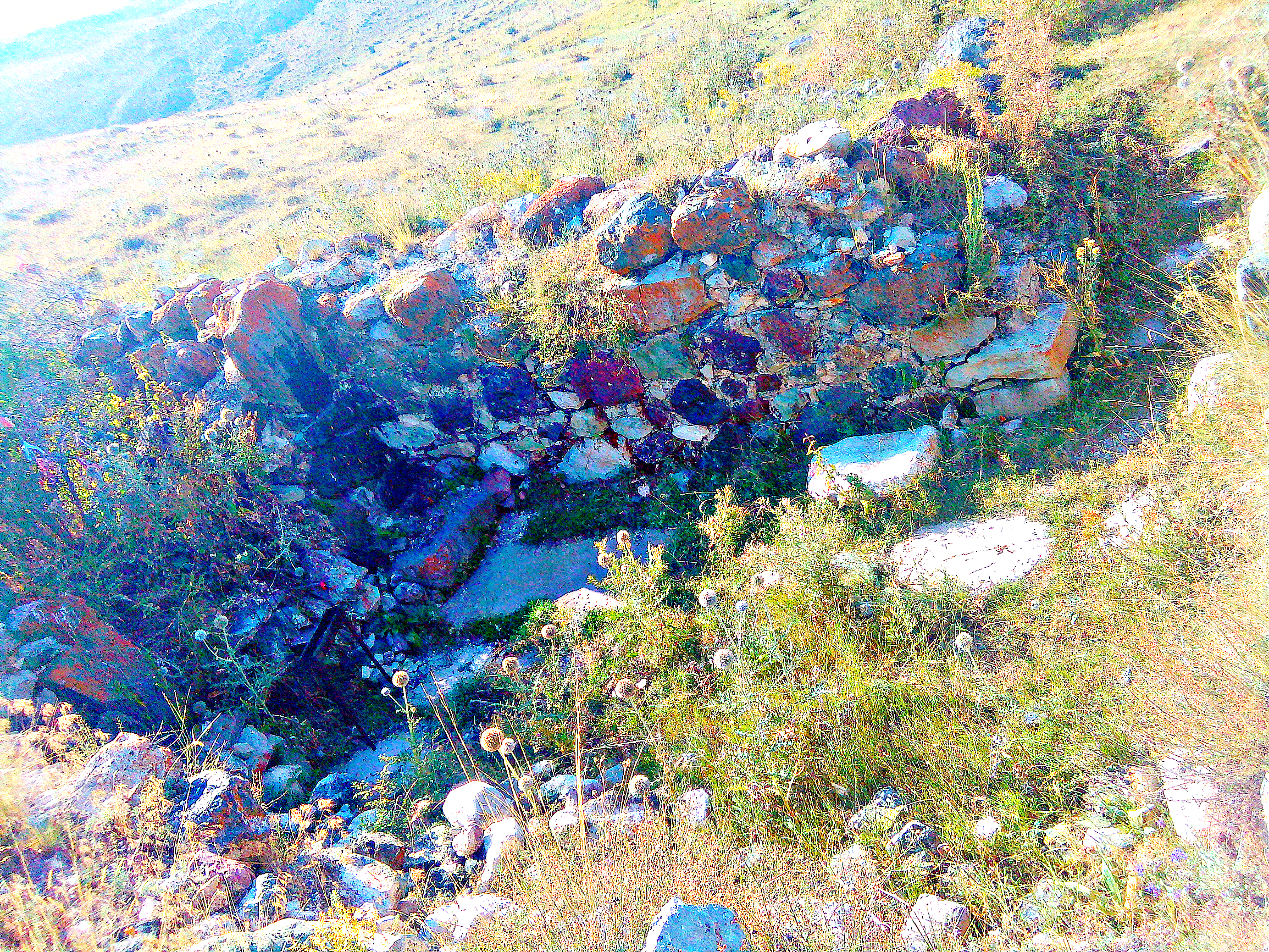
Ruined church near the village
