= Uzair Jaswal =

Pakistani singer and actor

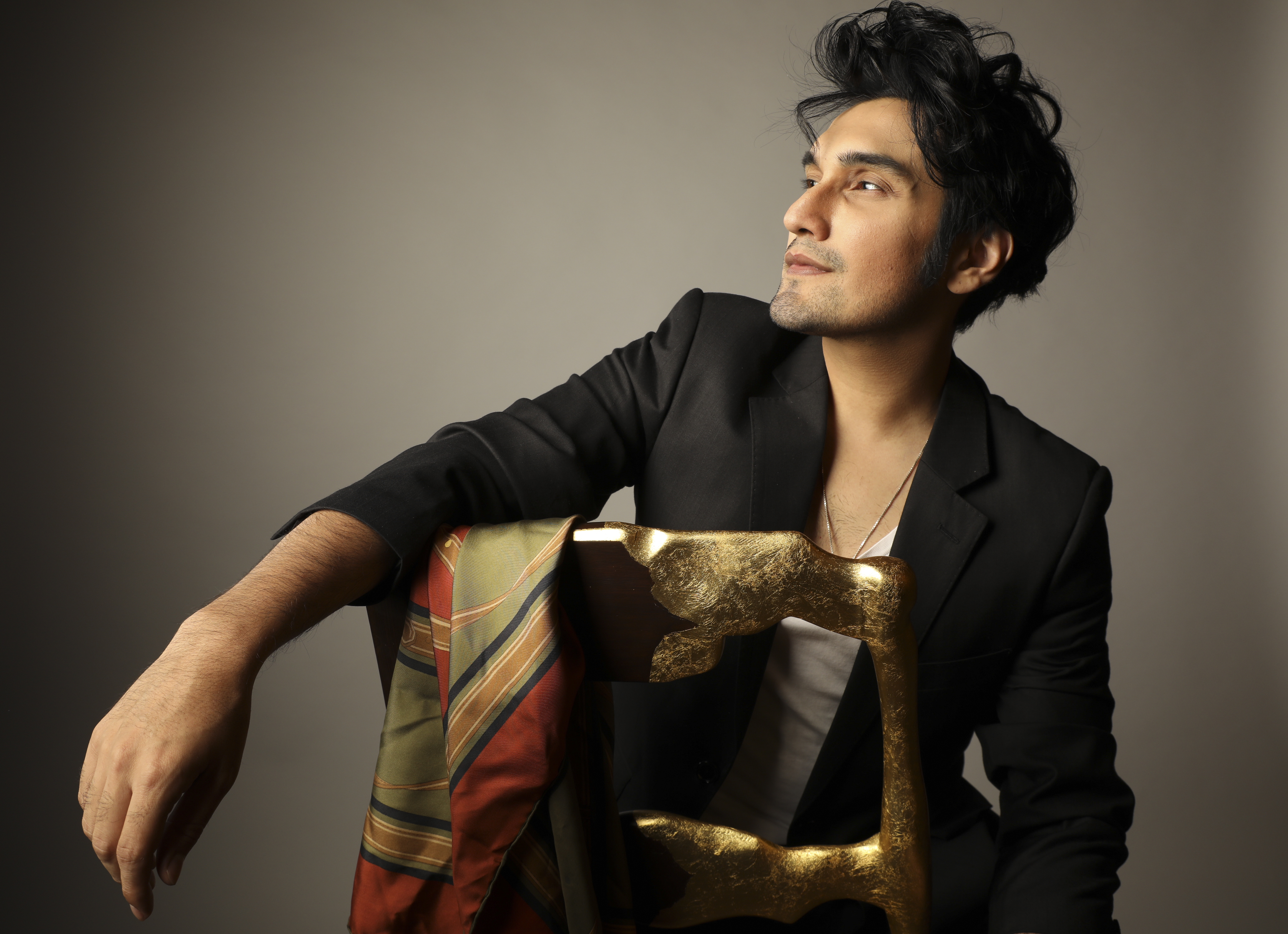
- Born: 22 November 1992 (age 33); Oregon, United States
- Occupations: Singer-songwriter; model; actor
- Years active: 2009–present
- Relatives: Umair Jaswal (brother); Yasir Jaswal (brother)
- Musical career
- Genres: Pop
- Instruments: Vocals; Guitar
- Years active: 2009–present

Uzair Jaswal (Urdu: عذیرجسوال) is a Pakistani singer-songwriter and actor.

== Career ==
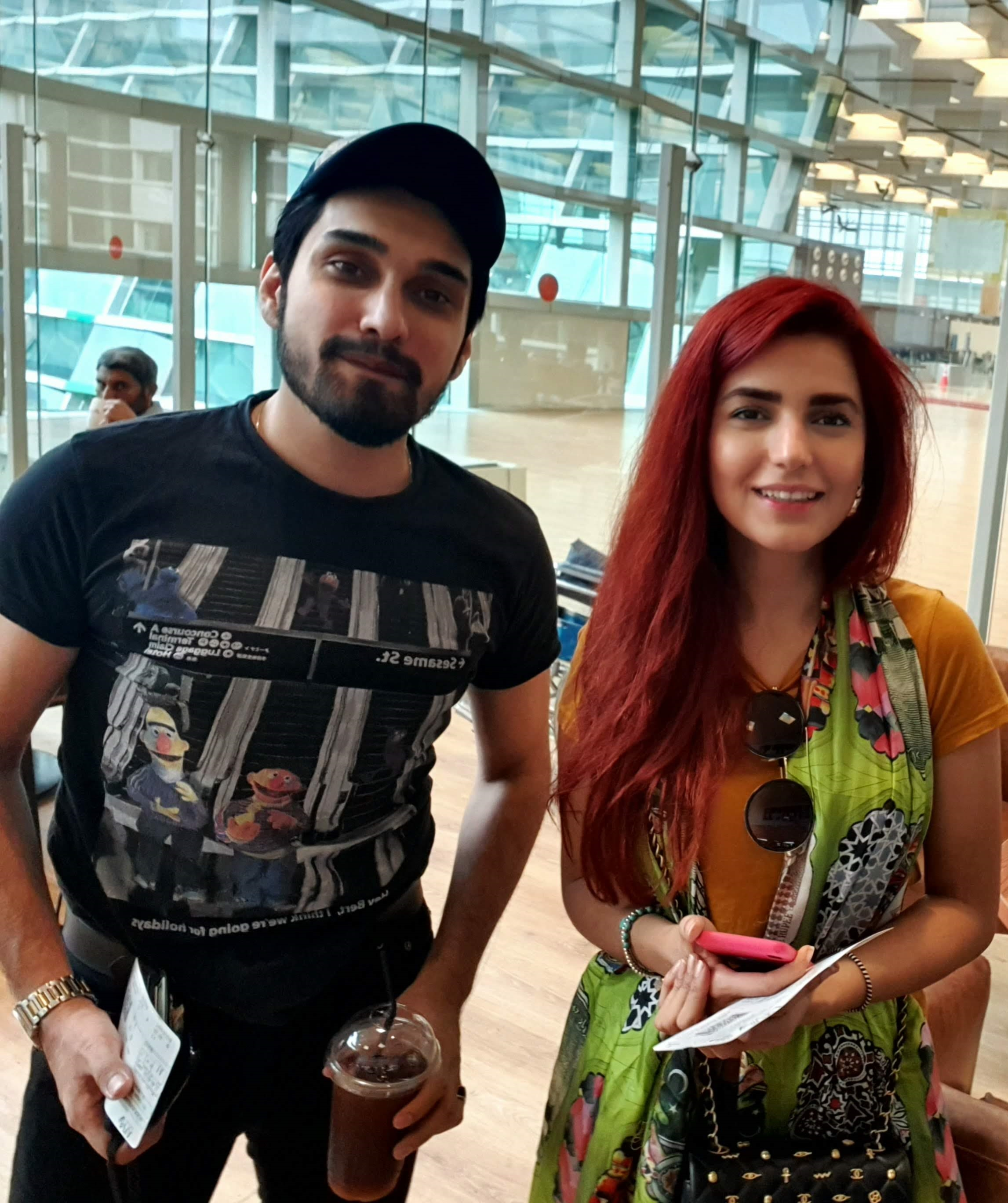
Momina Mustehsan and Uzair Jaswal

Uzair started his career at the age of 14. At 16, he wrote his first song and was the lead singer of a band called Scar which performed alternative-rock covers. Some of his popular singles include "Tere Bin", "Jaanvey", "Meree Rooh", "Bolay" and "Yaheen". His tracks "Nindiya Ke Paar" and "Bolay" were featured in the 5th season of Coke Studio. At 21, he was the youngest performer of Coke Studio Pakistan in its first 7 seasons.

Uzair branched out into acting. He has worked in three Pakistani films, namely, Gol Chakkar, Slackistan and Jalaibee. He debuted on Pakistani TV with the drama series Moray Saiyaan on ARY Digital in 2016.

He released his debut album titled "Na Bhulana" in the end of 2016, after a decade of making music. The album contains 11 individual tracks and is titled on the hit song "Na Bhulana" which was also the title track of his drama Moray Saiyaan. He won the award for the "Album of The Year" at the 16th Lux Style Awards for "Na Bhulana". His drama Shayad is currently airing on Geo Entertainment where he is performing impressively.

=== Bollywood Debut ===
Jaswal made his playback singing debut in the Bollywood film Ek Paheli Leela in 2015. He sang the song titled "Tere Bin Nahi Laage", which was a recreated version of his earlier hit, "Tere Bin". The song was recreated by Amaal Mallik with a few lyrics added by Kumaar for the film. "Tere Bin" won The Gold Disc Award at the Radio Mirchi Awards in India.yes

== Discography ==
=== Singles ===
Song(s)	Notes
"Sajna"	

== Filmography ==
=== Films ===
Year	Film	Role	Notes
2010	Slackistan	Himself	Debut
2012	Gol Chakkar		
2015	Jalaibee	Jimmy	
2016	Oye Kuch Kar Guzar	Jango	

=== Television ===
Year	Title	Role	Channel
2017	Shayad	Saad	Geo Entertainment
