= Coke Studio Pakistan season 9 =

Ninth television season of Coke Studio

Coke Studio Pakistan
- Season 9
- Starring: Featured Artists
- No. of episodes: 7

Release
- Original network: Webcast
- Original release: 13 August – 24 September 2016

Season chronology
- ← Previous; Season 8 Next → Season 10

The ninth season of the Pakistani music television series Coke Studio Pakistan commenced airing in Pakistan on 13 August 2016, concluded on 24 September 2016 and contained seven episodes. Season 9 aired Fridays (digitally) and Saturdays (televised), on various timings and channels across the country.

The Strings and Coca-Cola returned as an executive producers, while for the first time in series history, season was composed by six music directors, namely Noori, Shani Arshad, Jaffer Zaidi, Faakhir Mehmood, Shiraz Uppal, and Shuja Haider under the supervision of Strings. Qawwali singer Amjad Sabri marked his debut and final appearance with this season shortly before his assassination on 22 June 2016.

== Artists ==
=== Featured artists ===
Following is the list of forty-one featured artists line-up, including this years' five of six music directors, that performed as individuals, duos and with chorus:

- Abida Parveen
- Ahmed Jahanzeb
- Ali Azmat
- Ali Khan
- Ali Sethi
- Amjad Sabri
- Asim Azhar
- Basit Ali
- Damia Farooq
- Faakhir Mehmood
- Haroon Shahid
- Jabar Abbas
- Jaffer Zaidi
- Javed Bashir
- Junaid Khan
- Kashif Ali
- Masuma Anwar
- Meesha Shafi
- Mehwish Hayat
- Mohsin Abbas Haider
- Momina Mustehsan
- Naeem Abbas Rufi
- Naseebo Lal
- Natasha Khan
- Nirmal Roy
- Noor Zehra
- Noori
- Qurat-ul-Ain Balouch
- Rachel Viccaji
- Rafaqat Ali Khan
- Rahat Fateh Ali Khan
- Rizwan Butt
- Saieen Zahoor
- Sanam Marvi
- Sara Haider
- Shahzad Nawaz
- Shani Arshad
- Shilpa Rao
- Shiraz Uppal
- Shuja Haider
- Umair Jaswal
- Zebunnisa Bangash
Note: Shahzad Nawaz is the only featured artist who served as a narrator.

=== Music directors ===
Following is the listing of artists that were assigned one of each, six music directors who composed, wrote and rendered songs with them, under Strings' supervision.

Music directors	Artists				
Noori					
Noori	Zebunnisa Bangash	Haroon Shahid	Quratulain Balouch	Shilpa Rao	Junaid Khan
Noori	Momina Mustehsan	Itself			
Shani Arshad					
Shani Arshad	Meesha Shafi	Abida Parveen	Rahat Fateh Ali Khan	Rizwan Butt	Sara Haider
Shani Arshad	Rahat Fateh Ali Khan	Amjad Sabri	Himself		
Shiraz Uppal					
Shiraz Uppal	Naseebo Lal	Umair Jaswal	Mehwish Hayat	Jabar Abbas	Nirmal Roy
Shiraz Uppal	Rachel Viccaji	Kashif Ali	Rafaqat Ali Khan	Himself	
Jaffer Zaidi					
Jaffer Zaidi	Ali Khan	Ali Azmat	Javed Bashir	Mohsin Abbas Haider	Saeen Zahoor
Jaffer Zaidi	Sanam Marvi				
Shuja Haider					
Shuja Haider	Abida Parveen	Ali Sethi	Ahmed Jahanzeb	Umair Jaswal	Naeem Abbas Rufi
Shuja Haider	Meesha Shafi	Asim Azhar	Momina Mustehsan	Quratulain Balouch	Himself
Faakhir Mehmood					
Faakhir Mehmood	Momina Mustehsan	Rahat Fateh Ali Khan	Zebunnisa Bangash	Javed Bashir	Masuma Anwar
Faakhir Mehmood	Shahzad Nawaz	Basit Ali	Damia Farooq	Natasha Khan (Pakistani Singer)	Himself
Note: Above mention artists in each producer team may subject to a change, if any change occur. Except Zaidi, each music director also debut as a featured artist.

=== Musicians ===
Following is the three backing vocalists that serves as a vocal harmony with the lead vocalist. Among them Nimra and Shahab marked their debut while Rachel returns, both as a backing vocalist and a featured artist for the second time.

House Band
- Drums: Aahad Nayani
- Dholak & Tabla: Babar Ali Khanna
- Guitars: Haider Ali, Imran Akhoond
- Bass: Kamran Zafar
- Percussion: Abdul Aziz Kazi

String Section
- Violin: Javed Iqbal

Backing Vocals
- Nimra Rafiq
- Rachel Viccaji
- Shahab Hussain

Guest Musicians
- Guitars: Omran Shafique
- Flute: Sajid Ali
- Guitars: Rahil Mirza
- Tabla: Fazal Abbas
- Guitars: Kashan Admani
- Drums: Kami Paul
- Bass: Bradley D’Souza
- Mandolin: Amir Azhar
- Sitar: Shehroze Hussain
- Rubab: Ustad Tanveer Hussain
- Piano and Keyboard: Umair Hassan
- Flute: Hassan Badshah
- Accordion: Azhar Hussain

== Episodes ==
=== Initial promo songs ===
On 3 August 2016, a rendition of Madam Noor Jehan's cult-classic song "Zalima Coca-Cola Pila Dey" as a tribute to her, was released with also revealing the premier date of season. It featured vocals by season 9's featured artists Meesha Shafi and Umair Jaswal.

Following previous year format, at the 69th Independence Day of Pakistan, Coke Studio released another rendition of a song "Aye Rah-e-Haq Ke Shaheedo" – a mili naghma (patriotic song) originally sung by Naseem Begum, on 6 August 2016. The song opens with a dedicated monologue, voiceover by filmmaker Shahzad Nawaz. The song was also as a tribute to those who sacrificed their lives during the Partition of India for the creation of Pakistan and reads, "Dedicated to those who sacrificed their todays for our tomorrow". "Aye Rah-e-Haq Ke Shaheedo" featured all the artists that were scheduled to lined-up for this season. It was well received by critics. Sharing their idea behind the song, the Coca-Cola team explained, "Coke Studio is all about bridging barriers and bringing people together through music. During this difficult period in our history, we wanted to unite the nation in recognition of all the heroes who have sacrificed their lives so that the rest of us can live in freedom. Together with Strings, we felt this song would be a beautiful tribute to them, and to their families and loved ones on behalf of our beloved country. Bringing together artists of all ages, cultures and geographies of Pakistan to perform this heartfelt rendition, originally sung by Naseem Begum, was our way of saying thank you." The song was used in closing credits of television film Ek Thi Marium aired on Defence Day.

=== Episodes ===
No. overall	Title	Artists(s)	Music Director	Lyricist(s)	Language(s)	Original release date
Season Opener
-	"Zalima Coca Cola Pila De"	Meesha Shafi & Umair Jaswal	Meesha Shafi & Umair Jaswal	Khawaja Pervaiz	Urdu	August 3, 2016
-	"Aye Rah-E-Haq Ke Shaheedo"	Season's Vocalists	Strings	Mushir Kazmi	Urdu	August 5, 2016
Episode 1
45	"Sasu Mangay"	Naseebo Lal & Umair Jaswal	Shiraz Uppal	Traditional Indian & Shakeel Sohail	Marwari & Punjabi	August 12, 2016
45	"Janay Na Tu"	Ali Khan	Jaffer Zaidi	Ali Khan	Urdu	August 12, 2016
45	"Aja Re Moray Saiyaan"	Noori & Zeb Bangash	Noori	Zehra Nigah	Urdu	August 12, 2016
45	"Aaqa"	Abida Parveen & Ali Sethi	Shuja Haider	Khalid Mehmood Khalid, Salman Azmi & Waqas Siddiqui	Persian & Urdu	August 12, 2016
Episode 2
46	"Bholay Bhalay"	Meesha Shafi	Shani Arshad	Sabir Zafar	Urdu	August 19, 2016
46	"Afreen Afreen"	Momina Mustehsan & Rahat Fateh Ali Khan	Faakhir Mehmood	F K Khalish & Javed Akhtar	Urdu	August 19, 2016
46	"Baliye (Laung Gawacha)"	Haroon Shahid & Quratulain Balouch	Noori	Haroon Shahid & Khawaja Pervaiz	Punjabi & Urdu	August 19, 2016
46	"Man Kunto Maula"	Ali Azmat & Javed Bashir	Jaffer Zaidi	Amir Khusrau & Sabir Zafar	Arabic & Urdu	August 19, 2016
Episode 3
47	"Khaki Banda"	Ahmed Jahanzeb & Umair Jaswal	Shuja Haider	Bulleh Shah & Shuja Haider	Punjabi & Urdu	August 26, 2016
47	"Dilruba Na Raazi"	Faakhir Mehmood & Zeb Bangash	Faakhir Mehmood	Sabir Zafar & Zaland Khan Mohammadzai	Pashto & Urdu	August 26, 2016
47	"Tu Hi Tu"	Mehwish Hayat & Shiraz Uppal	Shiraz Uppal	Shakeel Sohail	Urdu	August 26, 2016
47	"Maula-i Kull"	Abida Parveen	Shani Arshad	Lal Shahbaz Qalandar & Sabir Zafar	Persian & Urdu	August 26, 2016
Episode 4
48	"Uddi Ja"	Mohsin Abbas Haider	Jaffer Zaidi	Mohsin Abbas Haider	Punjabi	September 2, 2016
48	"Aaya Laariye"	Meesha Shafi & Naeem Abbas Rufi	Shuja Haider	Traditional Folk & Saeed Gilani	Punjabi	September 2, 2016
48	"Paar Chanaa De"	Shilpa Rao & Noori	Noori	Traditional Folk	Punjabi	September 2, 2016
48	"Ala Baali"	Jabar Abbas & Nirmal Roy	Shiraz Uppal	Shakeel Sohail	Arabic, Persian & Urdu	September 2, 2016
Episode 5
49	"Main Raasta"	Junaid Khan & Momina Mustehsan	Noori	Junaid Khan & Momina Mustehsan	Urdu	September 9, 2016
49	"Shamaan Pai Gaiyaan/Kee Dam Da Bharosa"	Kashif Ali & Rachel Viccaji	Shiraz Uppal	Abdhulah Chili & Saeed Gilani	Punjabi	September 9, 2016
49	"Sadaa"	Rahat Fateh Ali Khan	Shani Arshad	Javed Ali Khan	Punjabi	September 9, 2016
49	"Jhalliya"	Javed Bashir, Masuma Anwar & Shahzad Nawaz	Faakhir Mehmood	Bulleh Shah, Waris Shah, Sabir Zafar & Javed Bashir	Braj, Punjabi & Urdu	September 9, 2016
Episode 6
50	"Meri Meri"	Rizwan Butt & Sara Haider	Shani Arshad	Bulleh Shah	Punjabi	September 16, 2016
50	"Tera Woh Pyar (Nawazishein Karam)"	Asim Azhar & Momina Mustehsan	Shuja Haider	Naqash Hyder	Urdu	September 16, 2016
50	"Anokha Laaḍla"	Basit Ali & Damia Farooq	Faakhir Mehmood	Asad Muhammad Khan	Braj	September 16, 2016
50	"Lagi Bina / Chal Mele Noon Challiye"	Saieen Zahoor & Sanam Marvi	Jaffer Zaidi	Waris Shah	Braj & Punjabi	September 16, 2016
Episode Season Finale
51	"Sab Jag Soye"	Shuja Haider & Quratulain Balouch	Shuja Haider	Musheer Kazmi, Farhan Saeed, Momina Mustehsan & Saad Sultan	Punjabi & Urdu	September 23, 2016
51	"Tu Kuja Man Kuja"	Rafaqat Ali Khan & Shiraz Uppal	Shiraz Uppal	Muzaffar Warsi	Urdu	September 23, 2016
51	"Nimma Nimma"	Shani Arshad	Shani Arshad	Sabir Zafar	Urdu	September 23, 2016
51	"O Re"	Noori	Noori	Traditional Folk & Sabir Zafar	Urdu	September 23, 2016
51	"Dil Kamla"	Natasha Khan & Faakhir Mehmood	Faakhir Mehmood	Noori	Punjabi	September 23, 2016
51	"Rang"	Amjad Sabri & Rahat Fateh Ali Khan	Shani Arshad	Amir Khusrau	Braj, Punjabi & Urdu	September 23, 2016

== Production ==
=== Format ===
"From the very outset, when we came on board in Season 7, this had been our vision. Up till then, it had been one person, Rohail Hyatt's journey. We now wanted to transform it into a collective dream. We were working on something as special as Coke Studio and we couldn't be so selfish that we kept it all to ourselves. We took our initial steps in S7 when we brought in external musicians aside from the house band. Season 8 was an extension of this. With Season 9, Coke was initially against taking on external producers because they thought that they already had the perfect formula and didn't want any changes. But we insisted."
– Strings, on Format of show, 4 July 2016, Dawn News.

For the first time in series history, each episode of season was composed and produced by six music directors – Shani Arshad, Noori, Shiraz Uppal, Faakhir Mehmood, Shuja Haider, and Jaffer Zaidi. While Bilal Maqsood and Faisal Kapadia served as executive producers and show runners for season along with Coca-Cola.

For this particular season, all the lined-up artists were selected by assigned music director/producer of each episode for their team with the final approval of Strings, whereas the songs' lyrics and compositions were done by producers. Performers were mutually selected by each producer and Strings, who would perform them. Season 9 featured mostly original songs.

The format of the show was initially planned to be instilled when Strings held the reins of show. However, the duo wanted to stay with the original format and started making changes in season 7 and season 8, bringing new artists and more original songs. The format would not be adapted in next seasons of series.

In an interview with Samaa, Strings said, "We've always believed in collaborations because this is how the industry grows. After the monumental response of season 8, we decided to bring onboard 6 of Pakistan's leading music directors to be a part of Coke Studio. Our vision since season 7 has been to involve more and more people from our music industry and make this platform a collective dream. When we presented the idea to Coca-Cola, they loved it and were fully supportive. It was a challenging task and our guidance was required throughout the process, but today we are extremely satisfied that we took this initiative."

=== Debutants ===
Pakistani actors Mehwish Hayat and Junaid Khan made their singing debut in the season, while Indian singer Shilpa Rao was announced as a featured artist, under Noori's supervision. Rao explained, "I met Noori in Delhi for lunch at a common friends’ gathering, we hung out, sang songs together and that is when they asked me to come to Pakistan and sing for Coke Studio. I agreed – Ali took it very seriously and actually got me here to record the song. It's basically musicians bonding with each other. One song can make you friends for life – that is the power of music," sharing her experience she stated, " It [Coke Studio Pakistan] is a place where all the musicians are in an environment where they have their instruments, their space and the freedom to choose anything and convey it to the people in their own style; it's very powerful." Atif Aslam announced that he would not return to season 9.

Veteran Qawwali singer Amjad Sabri made his final and debut appearance on Coke Studio, before his death on 22 June 2016 in a targeted killing, where he recorded a rendition of qawali, "Aj Rung Hai" with Rahat Fateh Ali Khan. Coca-Cola GM Rizwan U. Khan said, "Coke Studio is the ultimate manifestation of Coca-Cola's music strategy and Season 9 will further strengthen Coca-Cola's cultural leadership, celebrating diversity while bridging barriers relevant to the youth of today, it is very distressing that Amjad Sabri himself will not be with all of us to see Season 9 go on air in August. His death is a huge national loss."

=== Coke Studio for the deaf ===
On 30 July 2016, preceding to the launch of season, a special musical segment called "Coke Studio for the Deaf" was launched in association with Deaf Reach program of the Family Education Services Foundation (FESF), for hearing-impaired persons with a setup invented by China that mainly comprises a special sofa/couch embedded with hundreds of vibration engines and LED lights that are synced with the sound of the song being played. A grand LED installation around the couch provides synchronized mood lighting to elevate the experience visually, lastly an LED screen in front of the sofa displays the video playback, while the studio is propped with guitars on stands, a drum kit and a keyboard on a stand adding to the overall ambience.

In an interview, Coca-Cola Pakistan's GM Rizwan U. Khan stated, "Coca-Cola, because of its all inclusive brand trait, revolves around bringing people together. It shrinks social barriers and encourages people to share their emotions and experiences. However, despite reaching the masses, an estimated 9 million of our population have some form of hearing impairment, and have not experienced the magic of Coke Studio. We are really happy that we are now able to make them a part of this unique experience and keep them connected with other people who have been enjoying Coke Studio for the past 8 years."

Richard Geary, founder and director of the Deaf Reach Program commented, "Our collaboration with Coke Studio reflects our approach towards opening new experiences for the Deaf Community and creating enabling opportunities for their inclusion and success. Coke Studio's new initiative will not only draw a circle to include those who are often marginalized, but serve to create more awareness and acceptance from the mainstream audience, helping them to better understand the challenges faced by those with a hearing impairment."

== Reception ==
=== General ===
Coke Studio's season 9 became one of the most anticipated series, after the immensely positive reception of the previous season. The change of format drew wide attention leading to the speculations that having six music directors on the show would bring chaos. Record producer Faisal Rafi said, "multiple-producer idea, if implemented, will be the last nail in the coffin." He went on to say that, "Producers are selfish people. They wouldn't want others to share their limelight." In contradiction to Rafi's statement, house band member and Coke Studio long-term drummer Gumby said, "The initial success of Coke Studio lay in the fact that we had an ensemble of producers joining forces. People like Asad Ahmed, Omran Shafique and I used to work in coordination," and said, "Hyatt did hold the reins but the show had our input as well." Speaking on the format change he explained, "it is ridiculous that a single producer churns out 25 to 30 songs alone." Citing the example of the Shiraz Uppal-produced "Tajdar-e-Haram" in season eight, he said "tracks like these prove that the formula works." Receiving mixed reception from media on the change of format, Faisal Kapadia said, "Bringing in new people was the need of the hour. It's going to shake things up and keep audiences riveted. It is our job to assess what works and to make changes accordingly. And honestly, with or without us, Coke Studio identifies Pakistan's pop industry. We don't just own it; the whole nation does."

The death of Qawwali singer Amjad Sabri brought wide media attention to series before it premier or any press release, when it was revealed that he was a debut featured artist on show before being killed in a targeted killing on 22 June 2016, just 25 days after he recorded his debut performance. His appearance on show became one of the most awaited performances on the Coke Studio. In an interview Faisal said, "On recording day, after a small briefing session, we skipped the rehearsal and went straight into recording. Sabri started singing in his grand sonorous voice and blew everyone away. We all cried that night. These two masters took us to a very different journey, a journey we can never forget. Just 25 days later, Sabri is not with us. We still can't believe it." Sabri became the first featured artist whose performance was aired posthumously.

The appearance of actress turned singer Mehwish Hayat was met with mixed response from critics leading the singer to comment on all the speculation saying, "Critics have not even heard me sing, people should wait and hear the song before they judge it. There are people who will hate, regardless, but all the haters who are talking negative about my Coke Studio debut, saying that I cannot sing, should know and realize that someone like Shiraz Uppal or Faisal and Bilal would not have asked me to perform on one of the most prestigious music platforms if they didn't think I could. This is a HUGE opportunity for me. This whole season is special and I can predict it'll have the maximum number of hit songs."

The pre-release television commercial of Coca-Cola announcing the premier of season 9 was highly applauded and received worldwide attention. As a part of show launching campaign, the ad featuring a duet of Meesha Shafi and Umair Jaswal called "Zalima Coca-Cola Pila Dey" was released on 3 August 2016, which itself was a rendition of Madam Noor Jehan's song, become instantly hit and successful. Following the tradition of previous season, Coke Studio released a rendition of Naseem Begum's patriotic song "Aye Rah-e-Haq Ke Shaheedo" as an Independence tribute to Pakistani soldiers and to those who died in 1947 Separation for the creation for Pakistan, and became immediate success both domestically and internationally. It features the entire line-up from the season and was praised heavily – in particular the composition, music arrangements and last of appearance Sabri. It garnered more than five million views in less than five hours from its release and reached no. 1 on Twitter trend for eight-hours. Indian newspaper Firstpost called, "Pakistan has the better version of Coke Studio" and went to say that, "as long as Bollywood continues to be the showrunner in India's music industry, Pakistan will be marked as the Coke Studio that's always been much more memorable."

Season 9 received generally mixed reviews from critics. After shows on-air, it received criticism regarding change of format and mere involvement of Strings. In response to such reviews and criticism on show former drummer and Nescafe Basement founder Xulfi said, "just stop hating" and expressed that "we are lucky to have music shows like Coke Studio and Nescafe Basement in our country." In India, Coke Studio Pakistan is one of the most anticipated and watched show during its airing, with critics and artists applauding the show more than country's own version. Marwari Punjabi-folk-singer Naseebo Lal who appeared after a long time on a national platform was met with extravagant reception, because of her association with "Stage Dramas" and singing controversial songs for it, she was under the negative impression of public, though popular among stage fraternity. After her Coke Studio debut she received immensely positive response both from public and media, in an interview she said,"singing for Coke Studio was a unique experience. I think this is a turning point in my career, people from everywhere are congratulating me for my song and it has gained more popularity than I expected it to." Singer and actor Ahmed Jahanzeb was also one of the featured artists on Coke Studio who appeared after almost a gap of eight-years on national platform, his duet "Khaki Banda" with Umair Jaswal was highly applauded by critics, commenting on its success Jahanzeb said, "honestly, I was running the kitchen even before the song came out but now that people have appreciated our work so much, I may release a few singles or something, you never know. What I really want to create now is a platform to launch young talent."

Despite receiving criticism from Pakistan, Coke Studio season nine was one of the most popular seasons among Indians in show's history. In a season review, Maheen Sabeeh said, "After six years under Rohail Hyatt as music producer and another two years under Strings, this season Coke Studio diversified its format in a manner that can only be described as courageous; it opened its doors to six, distinct music names that took on the role of music directors," and said, "the amount of scrutiny the show inspires is also a marvel," she concluded saying, "In the end, it all comes down to the evolving direction of the show and whether as a listener, it's a direction, an evolution that you had hoped for. Under Rohail Hyatt's term as producer, the show was not necessarily about just Pakistan but the sound of this region and the cultures that have past through this land. The current season has a much more contemporary flavor and whether that's a good thing or bad is in the end, a matter of choice and taste. How you rate the show in your own mind, is, therefore, a thing of mystery and for now that's okay."

=== Episodic ===
The first episode generally received mixed reviews from critics and audiences. Writing for The Express Tribune, Ali Raj gave the episode three and half stars out of five, and commented, "If Strings are still as involved as they were last season, then this is somewhat a redemption. If they aren't, then we have diagnosed what was wrong previously." In a lukewarm review, Zahra Salahuddin of Dawn News said that episode one was "saved" by Zebunnisa Bangash's "Aaja Re Moray Saiyaan" and reviewed, "Overall, this episode added something new to the Coke Studio formula with a diversity of production styles. However, only one song stood out, making this a very lukewarm start to the season."

The second episode also received less than enthusiastic reviews. In a three star review, Ali Raj wrote, "With these two episodes, it is either the total absence of a plan or the simultaneous implementation of several that is telling us that things do not look good," and further said, "the episode was a winner had Momina Mustehsan, Haroon Shahid and Ali Azmat not been forced to feature on the songs." However, Rahat Fateh Ali Khan's version of "Afreen Afreen" received mixed reviews, with Momina Mustehsan's debut in the spotlight. The song was an instant hit but was criticized for its re-composition, and the style of singing. It was called it a "Bollywood" type song, with some also feeling Momina's presence unnecessary. After the song Momina became social media celebrity and was one of the most sought out person on internet in Pakistan. Aspiring singer Abdullah Qureshi took to his official Facebook page and criticised the Coke Studio team for leaving some lyrics from the original song and sang his own version which was met with huge positive response.

Episode three received positive reviews from critics, mostly praising Abida Parveen's "Maula-i-Kull" and Ahmed Jahanzeb performance in "Khaki Banda" duet. Mehwish Hayat performance was also praised who made her first on-screen singing debut.

Episode four received widespread critical acclaim, particularly the performance of Mohsin Abbas Haider with the song "Uddi Ja" that he wrote, and composed himself. Shilpa Rao's performance in folk-track "Paar Chanaa De" was also met with positive reception, on the success she said "'Par Chanaa' De is a very beautiful song. It is literally a theatrical saga because the song has emotion, anxiousness, longing to meet your loved one and hope. It's a folk song and the words are very hard hitting." In an enthusiastic review of The Express Tribune Srikanth Prabhu wrote, "Bringing in great diversity of genres, instruments and musicians – the composers have made sure this season stands out," he praised the episodes versatility saying "each song is very different and gracing perfection in its own way. It's wonderful to be welcomed with such a musical delicacy on a Friday ensuring that your weekend is sorted."

Episode five was also reviewed positively particularly the performances of Rahat Fateh Ali Khan, Momina Mustehsan, Junaid Khan, Rachel Viccaji and Kashif Ali. The song "Jhalliya" received mixed reception from public gaining criticism and acclaim at the same time, however in a lauded review, Ali Raj wrote "Jhalliya does not demand a lot from the listener and yet it pleases," further praising, Javed Bashir as "undisputed king of his territorial limits" and called Masuma Anwar a "vocal powerhouse", and said "Faakhir deserves all the praise in the world for putting this together," and concluded "Jhalliya does stand among the best, if not on top, of what the Strings era of this cherished show has given us." Music critic Srikanth Prabhu wrote, "Largely, this was not a disappointing episode for sure and mind you, achieving something like this is no small feat given some of the masterpieces that have emerged this season. The musical dose should definitely last for a week I hope. Or else, you can always go back to "Afreen Afreen" or "Paar Chanaa De.""

Episode six received mixed to average reviews from critics, with critics mostly praising Sanam Marvi and Saeen Zahoor's performance who came back to the series after three years singing a second duet together. Monina and Asim Azhar's rendition of "Tera Woh Pyaar" and "Nawazishein" re-composed by Shuja Haider, who originally performed them were also praised.

Season's final and seventh episode was the most waited episode in Coke Studio history, particularly because of Sabri's final performance that was released posthumously before his death in June 2016, a little over a month before series premier. He performed a qawwali, "Rang" with Rahat Fateh Ali Khan, the same qawwali was sung by Sabri's father Ghulam Farid Sabri and Khan's uncle Nusrat Fateh Ali Khan forty years ago. Their performance received overwhelming response from critics and people all over the country.

== See also ==
- Coke Studio (India)
- Coke Studio Season 8
- Strings
