= Jaffer Zaidi =

Pakistani musician

- Born: Jaffer Ali Zaidi; Karachi, Sindh, Pakistan
- Origin: Karachi, Sindh, Pakistan
- Genres: contemporary, semi classical
- Occupations: Singer-songwriter, composer, pianist
- Instruments: Vocals, piano, Synthesizer
- Years active: 2002–present
- Member of: Kaavish, Coke Studio
- Website: www.kaavish.com

Jaffer Zaidi (Urdu: جعفر زیدی) is a Pakistani musician, singer-songwriter, composer and pianist. He is best known as the lead vocalist of semiclassical band Kaavish. Propelled to success with the release of three singles "Bachpan", "Choti Khushiyaan", "Tere Pyar Mein" and album Gunkali, Zaidi has established himself as one of the leading musicians in the country.

Zaidi's album Gunkali received two nominations at the 10th Lux Style Awards, including Best Artist for Zaidi and Best Producer for Faisal Rafi. It brought him a critical appraisal earning him a nomination at Best Debut award. Zaidi has also appeared in music reality series Coke Studio in three seasons, both as a musician and as a featured artist. With season 9, Zaidi made his debut as a music director and producer leading a team of singers under his supervision.

== Personal life ==
He is the son of Shehryar Zaidi, a Pakistani television actor, and singer Nayyara Noor He married actress Yamina Peerzada in 2017.

== Music career ==
Zaidi is best known as lead vocalist and pianist of a classical band Kaavish (meaning: Effort) along with Maaz Maudood who is a guitarist and backing vocalist, they achieved critical appraisal with their music videos and singles released under band's name. Their singles "Bachpan", "Choti Khushiyaan", "Tere Pyar Mein", "Apnay Watan Ki Mitti", "Moray Sayyaan" brought critical appraisal and earning him the Rising Star award at The Musik Awards 2006, and bagged nomination at 3rd Jazz IM Awards. In 2008 for The Musik Award he received two nominations including Best Ballad Song and Best Lyrics. He received two nominations at 10th Lux Style Awards.

Jaffer has been a member of the house band on Coke Studio since season 2. He, along with his band-member Maaz, appeared as a featured artist in season 4, and has been frequenting as a member of the house band in season 2, season 3, season 4, season 6, season 7 and season 8, however 2016 marked his debut as a music director and producer in season 9, where he served as one of six music producers on the show, producing and recording songs with assigned artist. His team includes Ali Azmat, Javed Bashir, Sanam Marvi, Ali Khan and Saieen Zahoor. He returned as a music director on Season 10. His band Kaavish also performed a track "Faasle" featuring Qurat-ul-Ain Balouch.

== Discography ==
=== Television ===
- Behadd

=== Albums ===
- Gunkali
- Dastoor

=== Songs ===
- "Bachpan"
- "Choti Khushiyaan"
- "Tere Pyar Mein"
- "Apnay Watan Ki Mitti"
- "Moray Sayyaan"
- "Dekho"
- "Faasle"
- "Piya Dekhno Na"
- "Dil Mein Merya"
- "Baat Unkahi"
- "Nindiya Re"
- "Tere Naam"
- "O Yaara"

=== Coke Studio ===
- season 2: House Band
- season 3: House Band
- season 4: "Nindiya Re" and House Band
- season 6: House Band
- season 7: House Band, (Piano, Synth and String session)
- season 8: "Neun La Leya" and House Band
- season 9: Music Director
- season 10: Music Director and "Faasle"
- season 15: "O Yaara" (Singer, composer & lyricist)
