= Naeem Abbas Rufi =

Pakistani singer

- Origin: Karachi, Pakistan
- Genres: Pakistani music
- Occupations: Singer-songwriter, musician
- Instrument: Vocals
- Years active: 1990–present
- Labels: Heera Stereo, Kizmet Records UK Limited, Sound Master

Naeem Abbas Rufi is a Pakistani singer. He is known as a band singer in morning shows Utho Jago Pakistan and Mazaaq Raat.

== Career ==
Naeem Abbas Rufi emerged as a Pakistani singer in the early 1990s both on Pakistani television and in the Pakistani film industry. Before that, he made a name for himself by taking part in amateur singing competitions. At the age of 12, he was featured in a children's TV show 'Sung Sung Chalay' conducted by the music composer Sohail Rana.

== Coke Studio (Pakistan) artist ==
Rufi's has released three albums including an album dedicated to Nusrat Fateh Ali Khan. He is also an established playback singer in television and film industry. In 2016, Rufi marked his Coke Studio debut as a featured artist in season 9, as a part of the team with Shuja Haider and Meesha Shafi.

== Filmography ==
=== TV ===
- Utho Jago Pakistan
- Ishq Ki Inteha
- Mora Piya
- Mazaaq Raat
- Maaye Ni

=== Coke Studio ===
Rufi made his debut in Coke Studio's season 9.

1. Aaya Laariye (o darling bride) duet with Meesha Shafi - episode 4, season 9

=== Discography ===
1. Kawaan
2. Zamana
3. A Tribute To Nusrat Fateh Ali Khan
