= Nirmal Roy =

Pakistani singer (born 1996)

- Born: August 6, 1996 (age 29)
- Origin: Lahore, Punjab, Pakistan
- Genres: Pop, semi classical
- Occupation: Singer
- Instrument: Vocals
- Years active: 2006–present
- Label: StarDreamz Global Entertainment

Nirmal Roy (Urdu: نرمل رائے) (born August 6, 1996) is a Pakistani singer. Born in Lahore, she started her career at the age of twelve. Roy has performed and won many music competitions on national level, including the Voice of Kinnaird College in 2014. In 2016, she made her Coke Studio Pakistan debut as a featured artist in the ninth season, with the song "Ala Bali", along with Jabar Abbas, as a part of team Sheraz Uppal. Upon release, the song as well as Roy's singing style was praised. In 2015 she was again selected to take part in Coke Studio along with Ali Hamza for the track "Jindaani" . She was also selected to do playback for the Pakistani film Punjab Nahi Jaungi for the track "Raunaq-E-Ashiqui".

In 2018 she signed a contract with International Management Agency Stardreamz Global Entertainment.

== Personal life ==
Roy belongs to a Christian family.

== Discography ==
Year	Song	Program
2015	"Tera Mera Rishta"	Tera Mera Rishta
2015	"Ek Nayee Subha"	Ek Nayee Subha With Farah (morning show)
2016	"Ala Baali"	#CokeStudio9
2017	"Chal Challiye"	Single
2017	"Raunaq-e-Ashiqui"	Punjab Nahi Jaungi
2017	"Jindjaani"	#CokeStudio10
2017	"Silsilay"	Silsilay
2017	"Barish"	Single
2018	"Kuch To Log Kahenge"	Single
2019	"Chhalawa"	Chhalawa
2019	"Meray Is Dard Ki Dawa Dey"	Meray Mohsin
2019	"Gul-o-Gulzar"	Gul-o-Gulzar
2020	"Main Khwab Bunti Hon"	Main Khwab Bunti Hon
2020	"Soya Mera Naseeb"	Soya Mera Naseeb
2020	"Dil Ruba"	Dil Ruba
2020	"Dil Chala"	Single
2021	"Pareshan Kyun Laage Tu"	Chupke Chupke
2025	"Bekhabreya"	Love Guru

== Awards and nominations ==
- Nominated for Best Singer Female for "Raunaq-e-Aashiqui" at 17th Lux Style Awards
