= Shuja Haider =

Pakistani singer, songwriter, composer

Shuja Haider شجاع حیدر
- Born: 20 November 1982 (age 43); Lahore, Punjab, Pakistan
- Genres: Pop; pop rock; soft rock; sentimental ballad; hymn; folk; Sufi music; playback singing
- Occupations: Singer; songwriter; composer; record producer
- Instruments: Vocals; guitar; piano; keyboards
- Years active: 2005 – present
- Labels: Mainstage Productions; Soundscape; Bisconni Music; Shuja Haider Music

Shuja Haider or Shuja Hyder (Urdu: شجاع حیدر; pronounced [ʃʊˈdʒaː ˈɦɛːdər]; born 20 November 1982) is a Pakistani singer, songwriter, composer, and record producer. Haider is best known as a playback singer for films Khuda Kay Liye (2007) and Bol (2011) and more recently for his work with Coke Studio, Pakistan. Haider served as music director for Lux Style Awards for two years. He has produced over 50 albums and is considered one of the most established music producers in Pakistan today.

== Early life and background ==
Shuja Haider was born in Lahore, Pakistan to Sajid Ali (1950 – 24 May 2022), a singer-musician, and is one of four siblings. His grandfather was renowned Pakistani pianist, Master Sadiq Ali (1935-1984), often referred to as the master pianist of the subcontinent. Exposed to numerous music genres from across the world as a child, Haider started dabbling in music at the age of seven, although his primary interest was in athletics. He recalls that he always wanted to be a cricketer, inspired at a young age by cricketers Wasim Akram, Javed Miandad, and Imran Khan.

Haider's family moved to Karachi, Pakistan in the early 1990s, just as the city was becoming a cultural and creative hub for young musicians from all over Pakistan due to the influx of pop music and TV music channels. Haider eventually decided to pursue a career in music, and his main interest was in songwriting, composing, and producing music. He notes that he spent significant time during this period learning the ropes of digital music production which was still a relatively new technology at the time.

Haider lists Sting, Coldplay, Henry Mancini, John Williams, and Nusrat Fateh Ali Khan among his musical influences and has stated that listening to the Bee Gees, The Carpenters, Queen, Abba and The Beatles as a teenager was particularly impactful for him. He recalls that seeing composers such as Bakhshi-Wazir at close quarters helped him understand the nuances of making music: "I’m very lucky that I saw them making songs. It’s by watching them that I learnt a little about how a song is made, how its weight should be distributed, and what tempo it should be in." Haider lists Gustavo Santaolalla as his favourite composer.

== Career ==
=== Career beginnings ===
Haider established his own recording studio, Speed of Sound, in 1996 and produced Haroon's first solo album Haroon Ki Awaz in 2000 and Ahmed Jahanzeb's second studio album Parastish in 2003. Soon after, he rose to prominence as a singer with his very first single, "Tera Woh Pyar," composed by two of his brothers and released in 2004-05 by the Indus Media Group. In 2008, Haider wrote and performed a song for the Indian film Ru Ba Ru. He has since done work as songwriter, composer, and vocalist for Pakistani drama soundtracks (known as OSTs) including Tum Mere Hi Rehna (2014), Muqaddas (2015), Sehra Main Safar (2015), Mann Mayal (2016), Baaghi (2017), and Alif (2019). Haider is known for his collaborations with Shoaib Mansoor in his films Khuda Kay Liye (2007) and Bol (2011), where he recorded solos and duets with Ahmed Jahanzeb.

=== Work in Coke Studio ===
Haider made his Coke Studio debut in 2016 as music director and songwriter in Season 9 with the songs "Aaqa" (performed by Ali Sethi and Abida Parveen) and "Khaki Banda" (performed by Ahmed Jahanzeb and Umair Jaswal). Aaqa received praise for its "beautiful melody" and "thoughtful flourishes." Haider was lauded for his composition and arrangement in "Khaki Banda," as well as for his innovation in incorporating Bulleh Shah's Sufi verses into the song. Haider's songwriting in both "Aaqa" and "Khaki Banda" was noted for its Sufi-rock fusion, evocative imagery, and devotional expression. In the same season of Coke Studio, Haider also directed a medley of two of his original singles — "Tera Woh Pyar" (originally released in 2004) and "Nawazishein Karam" — performed by Asim Azhar and Momina Mustehsan and produced by Strings. In the season finale, Haider made his debut as a vocalist on Coke Studio with "Sab Jag Soye," performing with Quratulain Balouch.

The following year, in Coke Studio Season 10, Haider continued to work as a producer but also wrote, composed, and sang "Baanware" with Aima Baig. He also wrote, composed, and directed "Allahu Akbar," a traditional hamd performed by Shafqat Amanat Ali Khan and Ahmed Jahanzeb. The song received critical acclaim for its "complex structure" and "larger-than-life atmosphere," and Haider was praised for his ability to blend "Middle-Eastern and South Asian musical motifs." In the same season, Haider directed "Dam Mast Qalandar" — sung by Umair Jaswal and Jabar Abbas — as a musical tribute to Nusrat Fateh Ali Khan as well as "Jaan-e-Bahaaraan" (sung by Ali Zafar) as a tribute to the composer Master Inayat Hussain.

In Coke Studio Season 12, Haider performed the song "Saiyyan" with Rachel Viccaji, produced by Rohail Hyatt, the co-creator of Coke Studio. The composition was praised for its striking visual metaphors and its fusion of traditional Punjabi folk music with a playful musical arrangement. Haider continues to be closely associated with Coke Studio Pakistan and has been credited with bringing greater variety to the show in recent years.

=== Other work ===
In 2008, Haider composed and produced the song "Yeh Hum Naheen" (transl. This is Not Us), written by Ali Moeen. The song was part of an anti-terrorism campaign aimed at reaffirming Islam as anti-terrorism and promoting a more positive image of Pakistan to other nations. Haider sang the song along with artistes such as Strings, Shafqat Amanat Ali Khan, Ali Zafar, and Hadiqa Kiyani among others. The song led to a record-breaking 62.8 million Pakistanis signing a petition to uphold the message of the campaign, and was entered into Guinness World Records as the most signed petition ever at the time.

In 2017, Haider announced his work on Soundscape, meant to be an interactive, multi-city live music series that would feature a number of artistes from around the country, representing different musical genres. Although largely completed, this project is currently on hold due to the COVID-19 pandemic. Also in 2017, Haider featured in and produced music for Season 5 of National Ka Pakistan, a reality adventure show on YouTube that explored and highlighted the unique culinary diversity across the four provinces of Pakistan.

In the aftermath of the murder of Zainab Ansari in 2018, Haider wrote, composed and sang the song "Jeevan Daan" (featuring Saba Qamar) which addressed the issues of gender inequality and child abuse. In 2020, Haider produced and composed music for Season 3 of Strepsils Stereo, the first musical platform in Pakistan geared at producing a cappella music and presenting new musical talent.

In 2022, Haider launched The Idol Online, an online talent hunt to scout, train, and develop up-and-coming musical talent from across Pakistan. Haider asserted that Pakistan lacks the "institutions and platforms that make artists. There is no orthodox teaching of music anymore. With Idol Online, I want to provide a platform and an institution which would find and train artists as a means to give back to the community. I want to contribute to the betterment of the youth through music."

== Artistry ==
Haider has stated in various interviews that for traditional Eastern classical music to survive, it is necessary to blend it with Western music to make it more accessible and attractive to listeners today. Haider's music aims to highlight traditional compositions and instruments while thematically reinterpreting them in a modern context. Fusing musical styles, cutting across genres, and experimenting with arrangements is therefore a prominent feature in Haider's music.

Haider is also a vocal advocate for creating original music as opposed to the current culture of churning out cover songs, stating in an interview that "cover songs...(are)…the formula for overnight fame. But let's not overdo it as at the end of the day you only become a respectable star in your own right when you bring about original numbers that create ripples." In another interview, he similarly contended, "I personally don't agree with the practice. You can't own someone else's work. You cannot put your own name on someone else's art." Despite his significant success as a singer, Haider has stated in various interviews that he primarily considers himself a composer, songwriter and record producer: "Personally, I have always enjoyed creating music far more than singing. This is what I've acquired over time – songwriting, that is...Going on stage and making people raise their hands to applaud frantically for me was never my thing."

== Discography ==
=== Singles ===
- "Tera Woh Pyar" (2005)
- "Yeh Hum Naheen" (2008)
- "Josh-e-Junoon" (2011), Pakistan Cricket Team Sports Anthem (Composer)
- "Funn Mitti Se" (2018)
- "Jeevan Daan" (2018)
- "Kya Ho Gaya Hai" (2020)
- "Teri Qasam" (2021)
- "Rabba" (2021)
- "Main Na Janoo" (2021)
- "Dil Machis Hai" (2021)
- "Dukh" (2021)
- "Baaghi - Unplugged" (2021)
- "Allah o Akbar"(2021)
- "Faslon Ko Takaluf" (2021)
- "Mere Maula" (2021)
- "Alif - Unplugged" (2021)
- "Jeena" (2021)
- "Safina" (2021)
- "Baanware - Original Version" (2021)
- "Main Urra - Special Version" (2021)
- "Mumkin" (composer, producer) for Strepsils Stereo Season 3 (2020)
- "Udikan Laiyan Mein," for Strepsils Stereo Season 3 (2021)
- "Dil Bhara Nahi" (2021)
- "Want You Back" (2022)
- "Pyar Nai Fir Kerna" for Kashmir Beats Season 2, with Kinza Hashmi (2022)
- "Tu Hi Zindagi" (2022)
- "Shad Rahe Pakistan" (2022)
- "Nawazishein Karam - Original Version" (2022)

=== Film ===
- Khuda Kay Liye (2007)
- Ru Ba Ru (2008)
- Bol (2011)
- Verna (2017)
- Parwaaz Hai Junoon (2018)
- Aya Lariye from Jawani Phir Nahi Ani 2 (2018)
- The Donkey King (2018)
- Laal (2019)
- Nayi Soch from Khel Khel Mein (2021)
- Ghabrana Nahi Hai (2022) (composer and songwriter)

=== Television (OSTs) ===
- Tum Mere Hi Rehna (2014)
- Muqaddas (2015)
- Sehra Main Safar (2015)
- Kisay Chahoon (2016)
- Mann Mayal (2016)
- Sanam (2016)
- Tau Dil Ka Kia Hua (2017)
- Woh Aik Pal (2017)
- Dil Banjaara (2017)
- Baaghi (2017)
- Zard Zamano Ka Sawera (2017)
- Khafa Khafa Zindagi (2018)
- Pukaar (2018)
- Kam Zarf (2019)
- Sunehri Titliyan (2019)
- Mein Na Janoo (2019)
- Alif (2019)
- Dil-e-Bereham (2019)
- Dobara (2021) (composer and co-writer)
- Naye Hain Rastay from Khwaab Toot Jaatay Hain (2021)
- Meem Se Mohabbat (2024) (Composer)
- Ishq Di Chashni (2025) (Composer, lyricist)

=== Coke Studio Pakistan ===
==== Season 9 (2016) ====
Song	Episode	Notes
Aaqa	01	Composer
Khaaki Banda	03	Composer and songwriter
Aaya Laariye	04	Composer
Tera Woh Pyar/Nawazishen Karam	06	Composer
Sab Jag Soye	07	Composer and singer

==== Season 10 (2017) ====
Song	Episode	Notes
Allahu Akbar	01	Composer and songwriter
Jaan e baharan	02	Composer and songwriter
Sab Maaya Hai	05	Composer
Dam Mast Qalandar	06	Composer
Baanware	07	songwriter, composer, singer

==== Season 11 (2018) ====
Song	Episode	Notes
Aatish	04	Singer, Composer and songwriter
Jind Mahiya	07	Singer, Composer and songwriter

==== Season 12 (2019) ====
Song	Episode	Notes
Saiyaan	02	Singer, Composer and songwriter

==== Coke Studio 2020 ====
Song	Episode	Notes
Na Tutteya Ve	01	Composer and songwriter
Har Funn Mola	03	Composer and songwriter

== Filmography ==
=== Television ===
Year	Title	Role	Notes
2020	Alif	Shuja Haider (As himself)	Episode 20 & 21
