= Rizwan Butt =

Pakistani singer-songwriter and musician

- Born: Lahore, Pakistan
- Occupations: singer-songwriter, musician
- Musical career
- Genres: Pop, rock, sufi, classical
- Instruments: Vocals, guitar
- Years active: 2002–present
- Labels: Coke Studio, Nescafé Basement
- Website: www.trp.com.pk

Rizwan Butt is a Pakistani singer-songwriter and musician. He is best known as a lead vocalist and guitarist of music reality series Nescafé Basement. With the career over decade Butt has collaborated with many artists as their music director and debut as a singer in 2012. He marked his Coke Studio debut as a featured artist in season 9, as a part team Shani Arshad.

== Filmography ==
ACTOR 2007

=== Discography ===
- "Gharoli"
- "Ali Maula"
- "Tere Ishq Mein"
- "Bhangi"
- "Piya Tori Yaad"
- "Inteha-e-Ishq"
