= Coke Studio Pakistan season 10 =

Tenth television season of Coke Studio

Coke Studio Pakistan
- Season 10
- Season 10 logo
- Starring: Vocalists
- No. of episodes: 7

Release
- Original network: Webcast
- Original release: 11 August – 21 September 2017

Season chronology
- ← Previous; Season 9 Next → Season 11

The tenth season of the Pakistani music television series Coke Studio Pakistan premiered on 11 August 2017, and ended on 21 September 2017. Strings and The Coca-Cola Company emceed the show as executive producers, while the show returned with the previous year's format of music directors leading and producing their own songs under Strings' supervision, despite the decision of not adopting this format for next year.

The season featured 7 episodes, each having 4 tracks, plus one promo and one full song (hence two season openers); making it a total of 32 songs. Claimed by some as one of the best Coke Studio seasons of all time, it turned out to be the Strings' last Coke Studio production.

== Artists ==
=== Vocalists ===
- Aamir Zaki
- Ahmed Jahanzeb
- Aima Baig
- Ali Hamza
- Ali Sethi
- Ali Zafar
- Amanat Ali
- Attaullah Khan Esakhelvi
- Danyal Zafar
- Faraz Anwar
- Farhan Saeed
- Humaira Channa
- Humera Arshad
- Irteassh
- Jabar Abbas
- Kaavish
- Javed Bashir
- Junoon
- Momina Mustehsan
- Natasha Khan
- Nirmal Roy
- Quratulain Balouch
- Rachel Viccaji
- Rahat Fateh Ali Khan
- Sajjad Ali
- Sanwal Esakhelvi
- Sahir Ali Bagga
- Sajjad Ali
- Shafqat Amanat Ali Khan
- Shuja Haider
- Umair Jaswal
- Waqar Ehsin
- Zaw Ali

=== Music directors ===
Shuja Haider, Shani Arshad, and Jaffer Zaidi returned to the show; while Ali Hamza (Noori), Sajjad Ali, Mekaal Hasan (Mekaal Hasan Band), Sahir Ali Bagga and Salman Ahmad made their Coke Studio debut as directors. Each director produced individual performances too; all under the supervision of Strings. There was at least one tribute song by each of them too.

=== Musicians ===
House band
- Aahad Nayani; drum kit player
- Kamran Zafar; bass guitarist
- Babar Ali Khanna; tabla and dholak player; the only musician who appeared on all seasons
- Abdul Aziz Kazi; percussions player
- Imran Akhoond; guitarist
- Haider Ali; pianist
- Omran Shafique; guitarist
Strings section
- Javed Iqbal; first violinist
- Ghulam Abbas
- Ghulam Muhammad
- Muhammad Ilyas
- Babar Ali
- Khawar Hussain
Backing vocalists
- Rachel Viccaji
- Shahab Hussain
- Natasha Khan (Pakistani Singer)
Humnawa

Guest musicians
- under Mekaal Hasan's direction
  - Zain Ahsan; ukulele player
  - Mohammad Ahsan; flute player
- under Salman Ahmad's direction
  - Ustad Aashiq Ali Mir; tabla player
  - Sherjan Ahmad; acoustic guitar player
  - Raees Ahmad; violinist
- under Sajjad Ali's direction
  - Leonard Massey; clarinet player
  - backing vocalists
    - Wajji Ali
    - Ahsan Ahmed
    - Muhammad Ahsan Shabbir
- Aamir Zaki; guitar player under Jaffer Zaidi's direction (Note: It was Aamir Zaki's farewell performance, who died due to heart failure on 2 June.)
- Sajid Ali; flute player
- Nadeem Iqbal; harmonium player
- Imran Shehzad; tabla player
- Bradley D'Souza; bassist
- Amir Azhar; mandolin player; rubab player; classical guitar player
- Adeel Ali; guitarist
- Joshua Keyth Benjamin; pianist
- Gul Muhammad; sarangi player
- Ali Maaz Zafar; bassist
- Syed Adeel Ali; guitarist
- Adnan Jehanzaib; clarinet player
- Ghulam Muhammad; cello player
- Shehroze Hussain; sitar player
- Javed Iqbal; violinist

== Production ==
=== Format ===
On 27 February 2017, Rafay Mahmood of The Express Tribune stated, "the biggest challenge for the show is to bridge the gap between the indie scene and the mainstream musicians". Earlier, it was also rumoured that the show was a ten-year deal to begin with, and after Strings' third, Rohail Hyatt will come back in season 10 to give a farewell. However, the multiple-producers format was a hit previous year and it made the show to be returned with the same format, despite Strings' claim that the show will follow the original format. The show had been promoted in media by the hashtag #CokeStudio10.

In launching ceremony on 11 August, Strings shared that the process of making songs has three stages: the first is when it is decided by December what song to feature; the second is when the artistes construct and reconstruct the songs in the jamming room; and the third is recording phase when they bring their own special vibe to the tracks. The performance version for release is recorded in one take, with 21 cameras shooting simultaneously.

=== Debutants ===
Humera Arshad made her Coke Studio debut with this season, she exclusively told DAWN Images, "There are no music releasing companies and under such circumstances I think Coke Studio is doing a great job". Sahir Ali Bagga also made his show debut as a featured artiste as well as a director, on which he said, "I always admired the platform, and it was a dream to be part of the team. I'm very excited to be part of Coke Studio, especially in the milestone season 10."

Like past seasons, this season too featured some new artistes; who made their debut through the show. Maliha Rehman of DAWN reported on 23 July 2017, "Salman Ahmad's son Sherjan Ahmad will play the acoustic guitar to his father's vocals, classical singer Javed Bashir's brother Akbar Ali will be in the limelight and house band member violinist Javed Iqbal is excited to share the stage with his son Ghulam Muhammad on the cello this year."

Co-producer Bilal Maqsood said, "All of these young musicians are actually very good at what they do." "It was just by chance that Season 10 will end up featuring so many of them", he continued revealing names of some young talent featuring in the show including Sanwal Khan Esakhelvi; Attaullah Khan Esakhelvi's son; who was approached to him by his father Anwar Maqsood. Young Esakhelvi said on his show debut, "Coke Studio is exciting for me because my father and I will be singing a mash-up together that has mostly been composed by him with some additions by me." Sajjad Ali, on career debut of his daughter Zaw Ali, said, "This is probably one of the rare times that a father and daughter will be singing together". Ali Zafar commented on the career debut of his youngest brother Danyal Zafar, "I feel that the struggle is very important and Danyal needs to experience it in order to move ahead." Danyal Zafar said, "I always dreamt of a debut that could best help me express myself as an artist in such a way that my music could also connect with people." Aima Baig said in launching ceremony on her show debut, "As a new artiste to have a platform where you can perform whatever you want is like dream comes true and I feel proud to get this opportunity."

=== Strings' farewell ===
On 29 October, the Strings announced the farewell from the show. They said that season 10 would be their last production, "It has been a fantastic journey for us over the course of 4 seasons and we are grateful to have had the opportunity to learn and share our work". They further said, "2018 will mark 30 years of Strings and we are super excited to celebrate with all of you".

== Release ==
Poster of Qaumi Taranah by Coke Studio

Each episode went on-air on Saturday in broadcast syndication, a day after each track was released online. Each episode was aired in one-hour timeslot, with each track preceded by its behind the scenes short clip. By the day, BTS too releases online. Only episode 7 was released and aired on Thursday, 21 September 2017, to respect the holy month of Muharram. (Note: All times are in PST UTC+5.)

=== Promo song ===
The season was introduced by the collaborative rendition of "Qaumi Taranah" by the featured artistes. Released on 4 August, the anthem has been recomposed by Strings, "We hope to rekindle the spirit of patriotism and social consciousness in the heart of every Pakistani. This is more significant now than ever, as we are marking seventy years of our independence."

=== Episodes ===
No. overall	Song Title	Artist(s)	Lyricist(s)	Music Director	Original release date
Season Opener
-	"The National Anthem of Pakistan"	Season's Vocalists	Hafeez Jalandhari	Strings	August 4, 2017
Episode 1
52	"Allahu Akbar"	Ahmed Jahanzeb & Shafqat Amanat Ali Khan	Salman Azmi & Shuja Haider	Shuja Haider	August 11, 2017
52	"Chaa Rahi Kaali Ghata"	Amanat Ali & Hina Nasrullah	Traditional & Asim Raza	Sahir Ali Bagga	August 11, 2017
52	"Muntazir"	Danyal Zafar & Momina Mustehsan	Strings	Strings	August 11, 2017
52	"Ranjish Hi Sahi"	Ali Sethi	Ahmad Faraz & Talib Baghpati	Jaffer Zaidi	August 11, 2017
Episode 2
53	"Tinak Dhin"	Ali Hamza, Ali Sethi & Waqar Ehsin	Ali Hamza	Ali Hamza	August 18, 2017
53	"Sayonee"	Ali Noor, Junoon & Rahat Fateh Ali Khan	Sabir Zafar & Shah Hussain	Sahir Ali Bagga	August 18, 2017
53	"Faasle"	Kaavish & Quratulain Balouch	Jaffer Zaidi	Jaffer Zaidi	August 18, 2017
53	"Jaan-e-Bahaaraan"	Ali Zafar	Tanveer Naqvi	Shuja Haider	August 18, 2017
Episode 3
54	"Laal Meri Pat"	Akbar Ali, Arieb Azhar & Quratulain Balouch	Traditional folk	Strings	August 25, 2017
54	"Ronay Na Diya"	Sajjad Ali & Zaw Ali	Sudarshan Faakir	Sajjad Ali	August 25, 2017
54	"Baazi"	Aima Baig & Sahir Ali Bagga	Traditional folk & Asim Raza	Sahir Ali Bagga	August 25, 2017
54	"Mujhse Pehli Si Mohabbat"	Humaira Channa & Nabeel Shaukat Ali	Faiz Ahmad Faiz	Meekal Hassan	August 25, 2017
Episode 4
55	"Naina Moray"	Aamir Zaki, Akbar Ali & Javed Bashir	Traditional & Shah Hussain	Jaffer Zaidi	September 1, 2017
55	"Dekh Tera Kya/Latthay Di Chaadar"	Farhan Saeed & Quratulain Balouch	Bashir Manzar & Muhammad Nasir	Shani Arshad	September 1, 2017
55	"Julie"	Ali Zafar & Danyal Zafar	Ali Zafar	Shani Arshad	September 1, 2017
55	"Jindjaani"	Ali Hamza & Nirmal Roy	Baba Alam Siyahposh & Shakeel Sohail	Ali Hamza	September 1, 2017
Episode 5
56	"Sab Maya Hai"	Attaullah Khan Esakhelvi & Sanwal Esakhelvi	Ibn-e-Insha, Farooq Rokhṛi, Mazhar Niazi, Shakir Shuja Abadi & Shuja Haider	Shuja Haider	September 8, 2017
56	"Rangrez"	Rahat Fateh Ali Khan	Sajid Gul	Sahir Ali Bagga	September 8, 2017
56	"Ujaalon Mein"	Faiza Mujahid & Faraz Anwar	Faraz Anwar	Jaffer Zaidi	September 8, 2017
56	"Bol"	Shafqat Amanat Ali Khan	Faiz Ahmad Faiz	Shani Arshad	September 8, 2017
Episode 6
57	"Dam Mast Qalandar"	Jabar Abbas & Umair Jaswal	Bari Nizami	Shuja Haider	September 15, 2017
57	"Yo Soch"	Ali Zafar & Natasha Khan	Natasha Khan & Sabir Zafar	Strings	September 15, 2017
57	"Kaatay Na Katay"	Aima Baig, Humera Arshad & Rachel Viccaji	Ali Hamza & Saifuddin Saif	Ali Hamza	September 15, 2017
57	"Ghoom Taana"	Irteassh & Momina Mustehsan	Sabir Zafar & Salman Ahmad	Salman Ahmad	September 15, 2017
Episode 7
58	"Tera Naam"	Sajjad Ali	Sajjad Ali	Sajjad Ali	September 21, 2017
58	"Baanware"	Aima Baig & Shuja Haider	Shuja Haider & Syed Raza Tirmizi	Shuja Haider	September 21, 2017
58	"Maula Tera Noor"	Shafqat Amanat Ali Khan	Sabir Zafar	Shani Arshad	September 21, 2017
58	"Us Rah Par"	Ali Hamza, Ali Zafar & Strings	Shoaib Mansoor	Jaffer Zaidi	September 21, 2017

=== Broadcast ===
==== Television ====
Following television channels air the episodes in Pakistan;

Timeslot	Channel
05:00 pm	ARY Digital
06:00 pm	Geo Entertainment
06:00 pm	TVOne Global
06:00 pm	Dawn News
06:00 pm	Dunya News
07:00 pm	Hum TV
07:00 pm	Geo News
07:00 pm	Express Entertainment
07:00 pm	News One (Pakistani TV channel)
07:00 pm	Aaj News
07:00 pm	Abb Takk News
07:00 pm	Neo News
07:00 pm	Hum Sitaray
07:00 pm	Waqt News
07:00 pm	Such TV
07:00 pm	7 News
07:00 pm	Filmazia
07:00 pm	24 News HD
08:00 pm	Aaj Entertainment
08:00 pm	8XM
08:00 pm	See TV
08:00 pm	Capital TV
08:00 pm	Hum Masala
08:00 pm	Jaag TV
08:00 pm	Metro1 News
08:00 pm	Lahore News HD
08:00 pm	Filmax
08:00 pm	Film World
09:00 pm	Urdu 1
09:00 pm	ATV
09:00 pm	ARY Zindagi
09:00 pm	Jalwa TV
09:00 pm	City 42
09:00 pm	City 41
09:00 pm	Rohi
09:00 pm	Play Entertainment
09:00 pm	Apna Channel
09:00 pm	Punjab TV
09:00 pm	Raavi
10:00 pm	Geo Kahani
10:00 pm	A-Plus TV
10:00 pm	Channel 5
10:00 pm	Health TV
10:00 pm	Aruj TV
10:00 pm	AXN

==== Radio ====
Following radio stations air the songs in Pakistan;

Day	Timeslot	FM
Monday	07:00 pm	89
Monday	07:00 pm	91
Monday	07:00 pm	89.4
Monday	07:00 pm	101
Monday	07:00 pm	Hot 105
Monday	07:00 pm	107
Monday	07:00 pm	Awaz 105
Monday	10:00 pm	106.2
Tuesday	08:00 pm	107.4

== Reception ==
The show has been critically viewed for not producing new songs. Rafay Mahmood of The Express Tribune said that the lack of original music "has become a chronic problem with Coke Studio. With almost every passing season the title cover studio is becoming more relevant to the show than anything else."

After the season's artiste line up was revealed on 4 July, The News criticized the incomplete revealment while noting that Mooroo, Abid Brohi, SomeWhatSuper, Khumariyaan and Sounds of Kolachi should have been included in the show. Asif Nawaz of The Express Tribune commented, "While it's only time that will tell how the latest season unfolds, the urge to indulge in presenting our two cents about it seems too tempting to resist."

For the promo song; the recreated version of "Qaumi Taranah"; Umnia Shahid of The Express Tribune praised only Ali Zafar's performance and said, "The rest were simply wax figures executing a song – any song – any random song. Except, it wasn't just any random song." DAWN Images praised only Attaullah Khan Esakhelvi but said, "Overall, the song, the video, everything seems to be forgettable". This rendition seemed of "dull and lack emotions" to Asfia Fazal of Business Recorder. It felt "disjointed" to Maheen Sabeeh of The News, "not inspiring or motivating at all" to Shafiq Ul Hasan, and "no goose bumps" to Imane Babar Wahedi; latter both of The Express Tribune.
