= Kashif Ali (singer) =

Pakistani singer-songwriter and musician

Kashif Ali Baber
- Born: Kashif Ali Baber; November 4, 1992 (age 33); Lahore, Pakistan
- Genres: Pop, rock, classical
- Occupations: singer-songwriter, musician
- Instrument: vocals
- Years active: 2014–present
- Labels: Fire Records, T-Series

Kashif Ali (born November 4, 1992, né: Babar) is a Pakistani singer-songwriter and musician. He rose to fame in 2013 as a finalist on the first season of Pakistan Idol, coming in fourth place.

In 2016, he recorded a song "Mera Mann" for his Bollywood debut film Laal Rang, that earned him critical acclaim and later that year he marked his Coke Studio debut as a featured artist in season 9, as a part of team Sheraz Uppal.

== Career ==
=== 2013–2014:Pakistan Idol ===
Ali auditioned for first season of Pakistan Idol in Karachi. Ali passed, theater rounds and made it to Top 24 finalist. In semifinals Group 2, he performed Javed Ali's "Mere Maula" and eliminated on January 19, 2014 but was brought back for Wild Card where he performed Kailash Kher's,"Sayyan" and was saved by public. He was eliminated during the "Top 4" show after performing Nusrat Fateh Ali Khan's "Ajaa Teno Akhiyaan" on April 13, 2014.

Performance

| Theme week | Song sung | Artist | result |
|---|---|---|---|
| Audition | "In Dinoo" | Soham Chakraborty | Given Ticket |
| Semifinals; Group2 | "Arziyyan" | Javed Ali | Eliminated |
| Wild Card | "Sayyan" | Kailash Kher | Wild Card |
| Top 13; 60s & 70s Hits of Pakistani Music | "Bhul Jaan Gham Duniya De" | Masood Rana | Advanced |
| Top 12; Love | "Sohni Lagdi Mainu" | Sajjad Ali | Advanced |
| Top 11; Pakistani Pop Music | "Har Zulm Tera" | Sajjad Ali | Advanced |
| Top 10; Songs of Memories | "Naina Thag Lenge" | Rahat Fateh Ali Khan | Advanced |
| Top 9 Party Music | "Main Tere Agal Bagal" | Mika Singh | Advanced |
| Top 8 Personal Idol Songs | "Ya Rabba" | Kailash Kher | Advanced |
| Top 7 National Songs | "Chand Meri Zameen Phool Mera Watan" | Amanat Ali Khan | Advanced |
| Top 6 Judge's Choice | "Mitwa" | Shafqat Amanat Ali | Advanced |
| Top 5 Songs of Ali Zafar | "Jugnoon Se Bhar Lay Anchaal" | Ali Zafar | Bottom 2 |
| Top 4 Qawwali theme | "Ajaa Teno Akhiyaan" | Nusrat Fateh Ali Khan | Eliminated |

=== Coke Studio ===
After collaborating with Sheraz Uppal in film Laal Rang, he debut as a featured artist in ninth season of Coke Studio, as part of Uppal team.

== Film ==
- Laal Rang – "Mera Mann" (2016)
- Shyraa Roy Duet – "Duniya" (2021)

== Television ==
- 2013–2014: Pakistan Idol – (Season 1)
- 2016: Coke Studio – (Season 9)
