= Momina Mustehsan =

Pakistani singer, song-writer

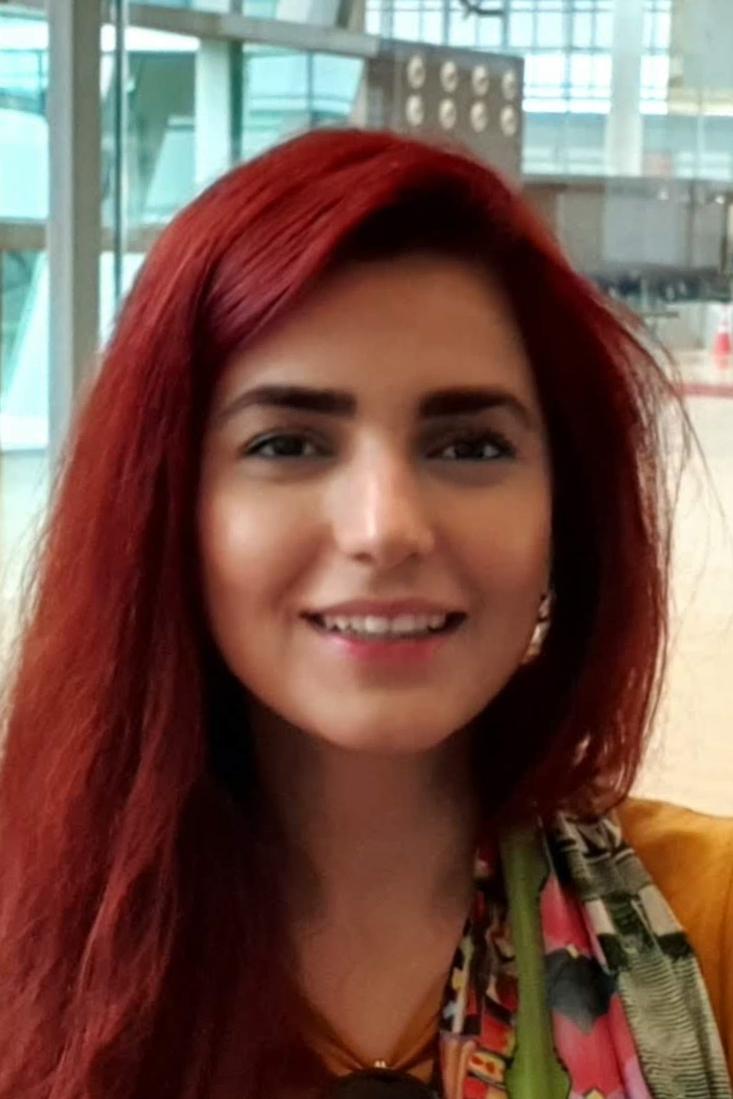
- Mustehsan in 2019
- Born: 5 September 1992 (age 34); Quetta, Balochistan, Pakistan
- Education: Stony Brook University
- Occupations: Singer; musician
- Years active: 2010–present
- Musical career
- Genres: Pop; rock; classical
- Instruments: Vocals, guitar
- Labels: Coke Studio; T-series; UMI; Junoon; Soch; ARY Films; Nescafe Basement; Geo Films

Momina Mustehsan (Urdu: مومنہ مستحسن; born 5 September 1992) is a Pakistani singer. In 2017, BBC named her one of the 100 most influential women, and the following year, Forbes featured her among its "30 Under 30" Asia list along with nine other Pakistani individuals. That same year, Mustehsan was honored by Stony Brook University, which named her among their "40 most successful graduates."

Mustehsan earned a double major degrees in Biomedical Engineering and Applied Mathematics at Stony Brook University. Mustehsan rose to prominence as a co-singer and writer in Farhan Saeed's single "Pi Jaun", and later sang the acclaimed song "Awari" for the Indian action thriller Ek Villain (2014). Her claim to fame came later, when in 2016 she made her Coke Studio debut as a featured artist in season 9, with the ghazal song "Afreen Afreen" and "Tera Woh Pyar." Following her debut, she became one of the most sought-out media personalities in Pakistan, and the songs became two of the most viewed songs of Pakistan, both garnering over 400 million views.

Mustehsan's next three singles, "Aaya Na Tu" (2018), "Baari" (2019) and "Uchiyan Deewaran" (2020) peaked on YouTube within 24 hours upon their releases and all of them have since gained more than 200 million views collectively, and received critical compliment for her voice in the original soundtrack of the television series Alif (2019). Alongside her singing career, Mustehsan is vocal about issues such as the role of women in Pakistan, feminism and mental health.

== Life and career ==
=== Early life and career beginnings (1992–2014) ===
Mustehsan was born on 5 September 1992 in Quetta, Balochistan, in a Shia Muslim family of Urdu-speaking parents. Her mother, Huma Mustehsan, is a doctor, and father, Kazim Mustehsan, is a retired brigadier from the Pakistan Army, and a recipient of Sitara-i-Imtiaz, the third highest honour and civilian award of the country. She has two siblings: an elder brother, Hashim Mustehsan, who is a doctor, and a younger brother, Haider Mustehsan, a singer who previously served as an intern at the Pakistan Mission to the United Nations. Due to her father's profession as an army officer, the family was posted in a number of places in Pakistan and around the world, including Multan, New York, Paris and Kyiv, but was primarily raised in Islamabad, which she considers her hometown.

Mustehsan completed her A-Level from Lahore Grammar School and later moved to the United States for higher studies and graduated with degrees in Biomedical Engineering and Applied Mathematics from Stony Brook University in 2016. At the time of her graduation, she was on the Dean's list.

Mustehsan at first learnt to play violin and sang in public for the first time in a choir of her grade school, without any formal music training. Recalling, Mustehsan told that her teacher had asked her if she had something to show and had said, "I think you sing well". She further told that she realized she had interest in music after when she had sung for the first time then. Her first encounter with the music came in 2004, when she recorded her first cover of Irish singer Damien Rice's song "The Blower's Daughter". Despite having no background of musical training she was praised at that time.

At Junoon's twentieth anniversary, Mustehsan recorded a song "Sajna" for their album Junoon 20 in Volume I, the song was written by Ali Azmat and was a bonus track on album. In 2012, she wrote the lyrics for the song "Pee Jaun", and sung with Farhan Saeed. The song was also featured in 2015 Nescafé Basement with Mustehsan singing along with Hamza Tanveer.

In 2014, she recorded a song "Awari" for Pakistani band Soch who approached her, without telling her that they are going to use the song in Indian thriller film Ek Villain, she explained, "I was approached by Soch and they wanted me to feature on their track without disclosing what it was for," she recorded the song in her university dorm, "It was an extremely casual process and I never met anyone in person. I recorded the song on my own in New York. The contract was signed after the track had been lined up for release." On her future ventures she said, "I'm always working on new pieces. Music is a passion for me and not a profession. I have plenty of time on my hands... I might be working on a Pakistani project later this year. It's something that I am excited about."

=== 2016–present: Coke Studio and Baari ===
In 2016, Mustehsan recorded her first song "Zindagi Kitni Haseen Hay" for the romantic drama film Zindagi Kitni Haseen Hay, and marked her Coke Studio debut as a featured artist in season 9 later that year. Her first song "Afreen Afreen", alongside Rahat Fateh Ali Khan, broke all previous Coke Studio records by accumulating over 2.5 million views in one day, and has since garnered more than 300 million views. Additionally, the song made her the second Pakistani artist to reach 100 million views on YouTube. The other two songs she performed were "Main Raasta", partially written by her, and a medely of two of Shuja Haider's songs, the critically acclaimed "Tera Woh Pyar (Nawazishein Karam)", along with Junaid Khan and Asim Azhar respectively. The later has since gained 175 million views on YouTube collectively. Commenting on her Coke Studio success she said, "it was very overwhelming for me because these are classics I am singing with very well-known singers. For me it was a great honour. I was also very nervous, I never get nervous for anything. But I got appreciated a lot once the songs were recorded."

Revealing on her future in music Mustehsan said "I don't want to pursue music as a career. For me, it was hard to make a decision since I had no references. Maybe after me, people would come out to show their talent," and explained "I don't think releasing number of albums defines a musician. I do music for myself and not for the masses. I'm not into the idea of being a celebrity or having people know or follow me."

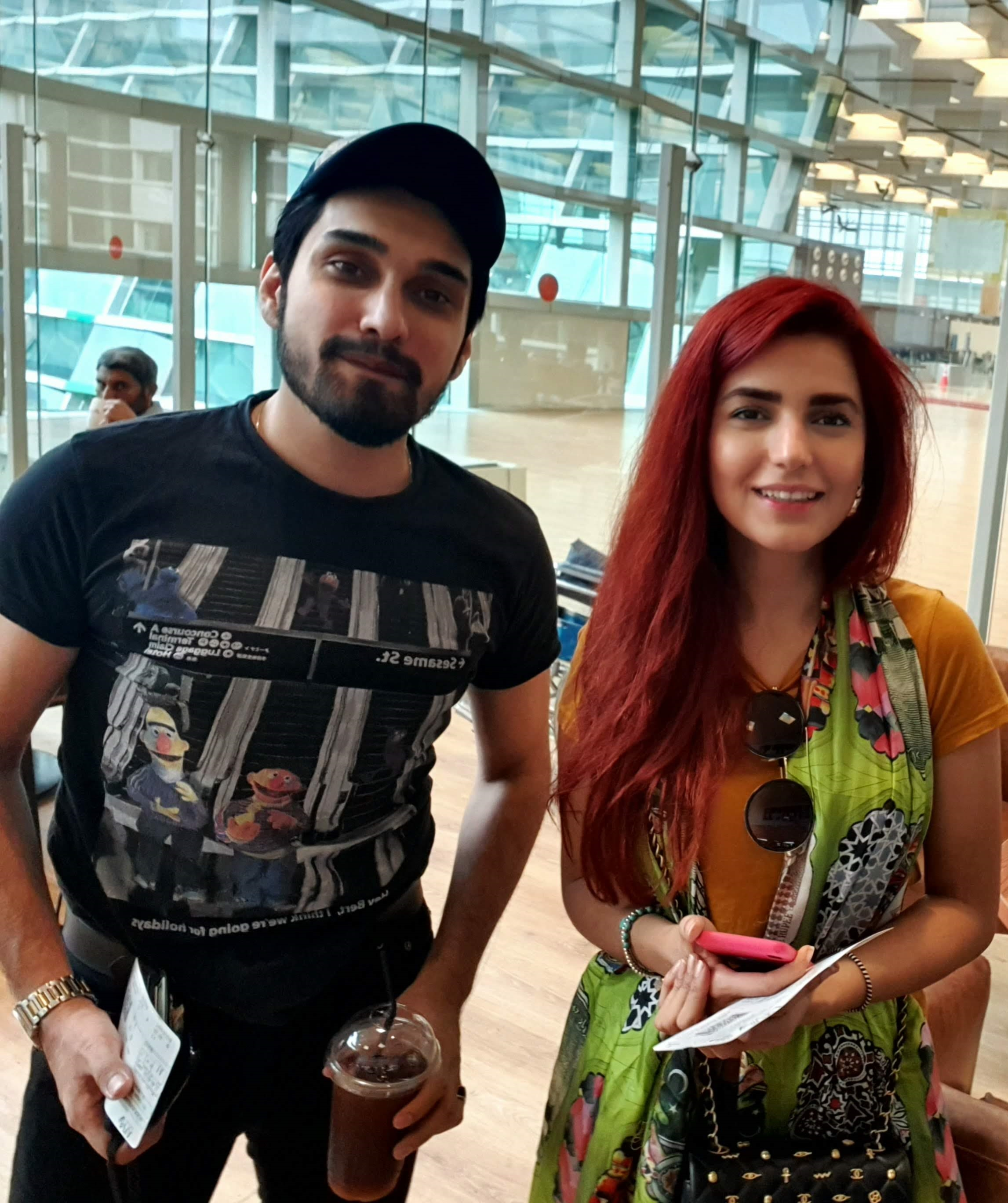
Mustehsan with singer Uzair Jaswal in 2017

In February 2017, she released the anthem for the Pakistan Super League franchise Islamabad United. Leading media outlets, The Express Tribune and Geo News criticized the heavy use of auto-tune and the lack of substance in the single, titled "Cricket Jorrey Pakistan" (Cricket Unites Pakistan). On 3 November, "Afreen Afreen" became the fastest Pakistani origin video to mark 100 million views on YouTube, and become the most viewed Pakistani origin YouTube video on 10 November, leaving behind Atif Aslam's rendition of "Tajdar-e-Haram" and Imran Khan's "Amplifier". That same year, she collaborated with the Coke Studio for a second time, and released three songs, one of which was the "Qaumi Taranah" (national anthem of Pakistan). which she sang with the other featured artists of the season. Released on 14 August, critics criticized the rendition, saying that it failed to "win hearts". Her next song released was "Muntazir", which was composed and written by Strings. Featured alongside the debutante Danyal Zafar, the song received positive reviews, and became one of the most viewed song of the season. The Sufi rock "Ghoom Taana" was her final song, released in the season, and also featured the band Irteassh. Both the original and the recreated versions were written and composed by Salman Ahmad, and the song was originally released in 2003 by the band Junoon in their album Door. The song received mixed to positive reviews from the critics upon release, but Mustehsan and Irteassh were praised for their versatility in the song.

Mustehsan began 2018 with the single "Aaya Na Tu", which she sang with the Indian singer Arjun Kanungo. Composed by Kanungo, and written by Kunaal Vermaa, the single was released under the label of Universal Music India. The single was shot in Bangkok, and Mustehsan said that the song addresses "rejection, pain and the burden of true love". Upon release, the song topped the Hindi and Urdu music charts, trended at number five on YouTube several hours later, and has garnered more than 70 million views since its release on YouTube.

Among her songs from the eleventh season of Coke Studio in 2018, one of them was "Ko Ko Korina", a remake of the 1966 film Armaan, with Ahad Raza Mir. Upon release, the song raised nation-wide hue and cry since the classic was widely believed to be destroyed by both singers. Within a few days of the video being released on YouTube, it became the most-disliked video in the music show's 11-year history. Even the Minister for Human Rights in Pakistan, Shireen Mazari, termed the remake as "horrendous". Waheed Murad's son Adil Murad also apologized from Pakistani nation for allowing Coke Studio a remake of the song. Her next song from the studio, "Roye Roye", achieved mixed reception; some praising the song as "nostalgic revival of old school melodies" and some complained about its "clichéd lyrics". Later that year, she collaborated with Sahir Ali Bagga for the second time for Jawani Phir Nahi Ani 2, where she performed the song "Ishq Hoa Jo Tari", which was filmed on Sara Loren and was a commercial success.

In 2019, Mustehsan reteamed up with Shuja Haider and came up with the title song "Alif" from the Geo TV's acclaimed television series Alif. The song received positive reception; Sophia Qureshi from Masala! regarded the title track as a "guide to their effortless vocals as the tempo changes gears as needed" and said that the track will be "remembered long after the show ends." The year concluded with Mustehsan's collaboration with Bilal Saeed for the romantic music video "Baari", written and composed by Saeed under the platform of One Two Records. The song was well received by the audience and has since gained more than 90 million views on YouTube. Its 2020 sequel, "Uchiyan Deewaran", released in December, was viewed by more than 16 million views within a week of its release and received positive reception.

== Personal life and social work ==
In September 2016, Mustehsan confirmed and announced her engagement on Twitter to Ali Naqvi, a US based banker in California. However, their relationship ended in early 2017.

Mustehsan supports several charitable causes and organizations, that works for the welfare of women in Pakistan. She often speaks out in support of education for girls, and is particularly vocal about issues, such as women's rights and gender equality. Mustehsan has also been outspoken about mental illness and depression, and in 2017, she spoke about her personal experience of overcoming depression. In response to the family separation policy by the U.S. President Donald Trump, Mustehsan wrote on twitter: "Separating children from their families is traumatic and makes them more vulnerable in every way. This is inhuman. Children are children first, their immigration status shouldn’t rip them away from their families."

In an online interview, Mustehsan stated that she had donated all of her earnings of 2016 to make water-wells in the Thar Desert of Sindh. Mustehsan is planning a distant education program for children in rural Pakistan along with a polio campaign. In a chat show, she said, "I plan introducing distant education plans for children in rural areas where there are no schools or a learning environment. We'll introduce learning videos which, along with projectors, would be provided to the mosques in different areas to enable children to learn. From making roties [bread] to learning physics, they'll get it all." In 2017, Mustehsan was a part of the United Nations Women "Beat Me" campaign, that aimed to address the issue of domestic violence in the country. During the campaign, Mustehsan talked about feminism in Pakistan, and said:

"Do we hate our women? I don't think so. In fact, Pakistan has more women representation in government than the U.S., and we have twice elected a female head of state. Empowering women in Pakistan would mean raising them equal to boys, providing them the same education, giving them the same job opportunities, equal wages and equal respect."

In May 2018, Mustehsan (along with Sajal Aly, Ahad Raza Mir, Ali Rehman Khan, Sonya Hussain, Younis Khan, Ali Sethi and Gul Panra), appeared in the Coca-Cola advertisement. The purpose of the advertisement was to collect funds for Edhi Foundation, a non-profit welfare organization, under the "Eidi for Edhi" campaign. In addition to appearing, she also recited a part of the poem "Lab Pe Aati Hai Dua", in the Sindhi language for the advertisement. Later in the country's first ever live digital donation drive event, Mustehsan donated Rs. 1 million (US$3,600) to the foundation. That same month, Mustehsan lend her support to the "Taleem Do" initiative, a non-profit right to education program, based in Tharparkar.

== In the media ==
Mustehsan is considered among the most popular and high-profile celebrities in Pakistan. The release of the 2016 song "Afreen Afreen" established Mustehsan as one of the most popular singers of Pakistan. Mustehsan was praised for her looks and singing versatility. Upon release of the song, several critics and the viewers said that she was picked up for the song, so that people could actually "understand the lyric by seeing her beauty". Mustehsan often features among the nation's most beautiful people and the most popular singers list, and is among the most followed Pakistani celebrities on social media. In 2017, BBC named her one of the BBC's 100 most influential women. The following year, Forbes featured her among its "30 Under 30" Asia list, along with nine other Pakistani individuals. That same year, Mustehsan was honored by the Stony Brook University–naming her among the "40 most successful graduates" for her civil service and activism.

Mustehsan is amongst the top celebrity endorsers for brands and products in the country. In December 2016, Mustehsan became the goodwill ambassador of a cricket team, Islamabad United for the Pakistan Super League. She is also the brand ambassador for the soft drink Sprite and the hair color L'Oréal. In 2017, Mustehsan represented Pakistan at the L’Oréal Pro Business forum in Seville, Spain. Mustehsan performed at the fifth ceremony of the Hum Awards with Sajjad Ali, Asim Azhar and Ali Sethi in April 2017. The following year, she participated (with Christian Karembeu, Younis Khan and Qurat-ul-Ain Balouch) in the FIFA World tour, and traveled from Thailand to Lahore in a special chartered plane, for the unveiling of the FIFA World Cup Trophy in Pakistan.

== Discography ==
=== Soundtracks ===
Year	Song	Title	Composer	Co-singer
2014	"Awari"	Ek Villain	Rabbi Ahmed, Adnan Dhool	Adnan Dhool
2016	"Zindagi Kitni Haseen Hay"	Zindagi Kitni Haseen Hay	Adnan Dhool	Adnan Dhool
2017	"Al-Burda" (rendition)	A-Plus TV Ramazan transmission OST	Shiraz Uppal	
2018	"Ye Mamla Koi Aur Hai"	Geo TV Ramazan transmission OST	Rendition of Najam Sheraz's classic	
2018	"Ishq Hoa Jo Tari"	Jawani Phir Nahi Ani 2	Sahir Ali Bagga	
2019	"Alif"	Alif	Shuja Haider	
2022	"Khudaya Vey"	Dum Mastam	Bilal Saeed	

=== Coke Studio (Pakistan) ===
Year	Season	Song	Lyrics	Music	Co-singer(s)
2016	9	"Aye Rah-e-Haq Ke Shaheedo"	Saif uddin Saif	Strings	Season's ft. artistes
2016	9	"Afreen Afreen"	Javed Akhtar	Nusrat Fateh Ali Khan	Rahat Fateh Ali Khan
2016	9	"Afreen Afreen"	F K Khalish	Faakhir Mehmood	Rahat Fateh Ali Khan
2016	9	"Main Raasta"	co-written with Junaid Khan	Noori	Junaid Khan
2016	9	"Tera Woh Pyar (Nawazishein Karam)"	Naqash Hyder	Shuja Haider	Asim Azhar
2017	10	"Qaumi Taranah"	Hafeez Jullundhri	Strings; originally composed by Ahmed Ghulamali Chagla	Season's ft. artistes
2017	10	"Muntazir"	Strings		Danyal Zafar
2017	10	"Ghoom Taana"	Sabir Zafar	Salman Ahmad	Irteassh
2017	10	"Ghoom Taana"	Salman Ahmad	Salman Ahmad	Irteassh
2018	11	"Hum Dekhenge"	Faiz Ahmed Faiz	Ali Hamza, Zohaib Kazi	Season's ft. artists
2018	11	"Roye Roye"	Sahir Ali Bagga		
2018	11	"Mahi Aaja"	Asim Azhar		
2018	11	"Ko Ko Korina"	Masroor Anwar	Sohail Rana	Ahad Raza Mir
2022	14	"Sajan Das Na"	Adnan Dhool Additional lyrics by Momina Mustehsan	Abdullah Siddiqui, Adnan Dhool, Momina Mustehsan, Xulfi	Atif Aslam
2022	14	"Beparwah"	Adnan Dhool Additional lyrics by Momina Mustehsan & Xulfi	Xulfi, Action Zain	

=== Singles ===
Year	Song	Co-singer	Notes
2011	"Sajna"	ft. Moen Jo Daro	From the album Junoon 20
2012	"Pee Jaun"	Farhan Saeed	Music video
2015	"Pee Jaun"	Hamza Tanveer	Nescafé Basement S3E6 track 1
2016	"Mirchi Ko Sprite Kar"		Sprite television commercial
2017	"Cricket Jorray Pakistan"		Islamabad United official anthem
2017	"Jee Liya"		Cornetto Pop Rock Season 2
2018	"Lab Pe Aati Hai Dua"	Ali Sethi	Coca-Cola television commercial
2018	"Aaya Na Tu"	Arjun Kanungo	Music video
2018	"Coca Cola Tu"	Tony Kakkar, Young Desi	Coca-Cola television commercial
2019	"Kishmish"	written by Qaran	ft. with Ash King
2019	"Yaariyan"	Rahil Mirza	Acoustic version of Nabeel Shaukat Ali's OST for the 2019 series Yaariyan
2019	"Baari"	Bilal Saeed	Released by OneTwoRecords
2020	"Uchiyaan Dewaraan (Baari 2)"	Bilal Saeed	Released by OneTwoRecords

=== Covers ===
Year	Song
2004	"The Blower's Daughter"
2011	"Mere Bina"
2017	"Har Zulm"
