= Kashif Ali =

Kashif Ali may refer to:

- Kashif Ali (cricketer, born 1994), Pakistani cricketer (fast bowler)
- Kashif Ali (cricketer, born 1998), English cricketer
- Kashif Ali (cricketer, born 2002), Pakistani cricketer (batter)
- Kashif Ali (singer) (born 1992), Pakistani singer
