= Damia Farooq =

Pakistani singer-songwriter and musician

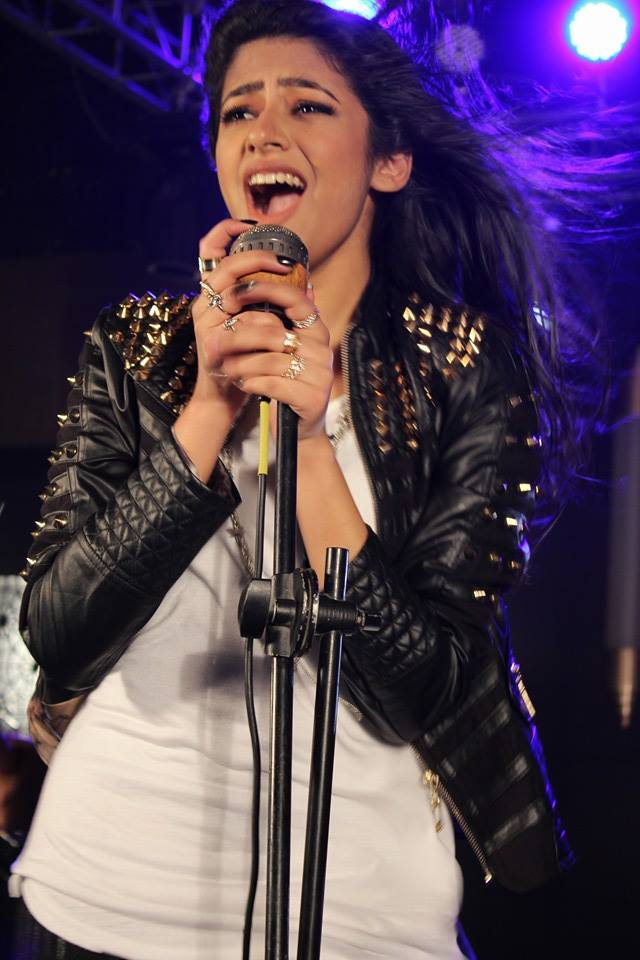
- Damia performing her single Jhoomo

Background information
- Born: 3 December 1998 (age 27); Lahore, Punjab, Pakistan
- Genres: Pop, classical
- Instrument: Vocals
- Years active: 2012–present
- Labels: Faakhir, Strings, Coke Studio

Damia Farooq (born 3 December 1998) is a Pakistani singer-songwriter and musician. Starting her career at the age of thirteen in 2012, she released her debut album Damia Debut which consisted eight tracks including three music videos. Later that year, she released her hit duet single Jana i miss you along with her elder sister, Parisa Farooq. She appeared on many TV shows and interviews on various channels. Since then, she has performed across the country and has done playback singing in drama serials such as " Sun Yara " (ARY Digital), "Phir Se Meri Qismat Likh De" (Hum Sitaray), "Dil Mohalay Ki Haveli" (Geo TV), "Zindagi Mujhe Tera Pata Chahiye" (PTV), "Kis Se Kahoon" (PTV) and many more. Sang in films such as Ishq Positive, Blind Love (2016), Punjab Nahi Jaungi and many more. In 2015, Damia launched her single "Rab Janay" and performed with the famous Romanian band Ex-Akcent TWO. In 2016, Damia released her duet single Jhoomo with Parisa Farooq and months later marked her Coke Studio debut as the youngest featured artist in season 9, as a part team Faakhir. Her latest hit, ARY digital's drama serial OST Sun Yara was nominated in the 16th Lux style awards 2017.

== Discography ==
=== Album ===
- Damia Debut (2012)

=== Album Tracks ===
- "Kabhi Rog Na Lagana"
- "Aaj Bhi"
- "Tere Khawab"
- "Saiyan Bina"
- "Tumhara Dard"
- "Tum Jo Nahi Ho"
- "Here Comes The Night"
- "Raton Ke Saye"

=== Singles ===
- "Jana I Miss You" (2012)
- "Rab Janay" (2015)
- "Janun" (2016)
- "Life is Chest of Test" (2016)
- "Dua-e-Reem" (2020)

=== Film ===
- Ishq Positive (2016)
- Blind Love (2016)
- Raasta (2017)
- Punjab Nahi Jaungi (2017)
- Tum Hee Ho (2017)
- Wajood (2018)
- Tere Bajre Di Rakhi (2022)

=== Television ===
- Kis Se Kahoon (PTV)
- Phir Se Meri Qismat Likh De (Hum Sitaray)
- Chand Jalta Raha (PTV)
- Dil Muhallay Ki Haveli (Geo TV)
- Kaneez (Aplus)
- Zindagi Mujhe Tera Pata Chahiye (PTV)
- Faaslay (PTV)
- Sun Yaara (ARY Digital)
- Coke Studio: Season 9 (2016)
- Gumrah
- Aik Larki Aam Si
- Suno Chanda 2
- Hum Tum

=== Awards and nominations ===
| Year | Award | Category | Result |
|---|---|---|---|
| 2017 | Lux Style Award | Best Original Sound Track - Television' | Nominated |
