= Kaavish =

Pakistani music band

- Origin: Karachi, Sindh, Pakistan
- Genres: Semi-classical, fusion, contemporary
- Years active: 1998–present
- Website: https://www.kaavish.com/

Kaavish (Urdu: کاوش) is a Pakistani semi-classical and fusion band formed in Karachi in the late 1990s. The group was co-founded by vocalist and pianist Jaffer Zaidi and guitarist Maaz Maudood. Kaavish's music blends elements of South Asian semi-classical (including ghazal and raga-inflected vocal techniques) with contemporary instrumentation and songwriting. The band has released a number of singles and recorded appearances, and has been featured on major Pakistani music platforms including Coke Studio.

== History ==
=== Formation and early years (1998–2006) ===
Kaavish was formed in Karachi in 1998 by Jaffer Zaidi (lead vocals, piano) and Maaz Maudood (guitar, backing vocals). The band developed a repertoire that combined semi-classical vocal phrasing with contemporary arrangements and spent its early years performing live and releasing singles and music videos across Pakistani media outlets.

In 2008–2009 Kaavish worked toward releasing a full-length album; press at the time discussed the long gestation of the band's record and the composition/production process behind their material.

=== Growth, television and studio work (2007–2016) ===
Kaavish released several singles and music videos that circulated on Pakistani television and digital platforms. The band's recordings and live work attracted critical attention for their melodic focus and the interplay of Zaidi's vocals with Maudood's guitar arrangements.

=== Coke Studio and national exposure (2016–2018) ===
Members of Kaavish participated in Coke Studio Pakistan, both as featured performers and in production roles. The band's composition "Faasle", performed with Quratulain Balouch and credited to Jaffer Zaidi for composition and lyrics, was featured on Coke Studio and garnered national attention through the series' broadcast and online distribution.

=== Return to live performance and recent releases (2023–2026) ===
The band announced a return to live performance in early 2024, posting on social media about live dates and an expanded touring roster that included original members Jaffer Zaidi and Maaz Maudood alongside collaborating musicians.

Kaavish released the single "Tairay Naam" in 2024; the official music video and credits were published on the band's YouTube channel and are catalogued on music discovery services.

In April 2026, Kaavish released the single "Intezaar", written by Jaffer Zaidi with bass by Waleed Attique. The song continues the band's signature introspective style but leans more toward hope than heartbreak, centering on longing and the anticipation of reunion with a loved one.

== Musical style and influences ==
Kaavish's music is characterised by melodic, vocal-driven arrangements that draw on semi-classical South Asian techniques (such as raga-influenced phrasing and ghazal sensibilities) combined with modern band instrumentation — piano, acoustic and electric guitar, bass and drums. Their compositions typically emphasise lyrical content in Urdu and favour intimate, restrained production that foregrounds the voice and melody.

== Band members ==
=== Core members ===
- Jaffer Zaidi — lead vocals, piano, composer (co-founder).
- Maaz Maudood — guitar, backing vocals (co-founder).

=== Frequent collaborators and session musicians ===
Personnel has varied across recordings and live performances. Documented collaborators include: Louis "Gumby" Pinto (drums), Awais Kazmi (guitar), Kamran Zafar (bass) and Khalid Khan (bass) in various studio and live configurations.

== Reception and legacy ==
Kaavish is cited in Pakistani music press as a band that occupies a niche bridging classical/semi-classical traditions and contemporary songwriting, with particular praise aimed at melodic depth and Jaffer Zaidi's vocal delivery. Their participation in nationally broadcast projects such as Coke Studio has been noted as contributing to broader recognition and renewed public interest in the band's work.
