= Masuma Anwar =

Pakistani singer and actor

- Born: Masuma Anwar; Lahore, Punjab, Pakistan
- Genres: Sufi, folk
- Occupations: Physician, singer-songwriter, musician
- Instrument: Vocals
- Years active: 2006–present
- Label: Fire Records,

Masuma Anwar is a Pakistani pediatric singer-songwriter and musician. She rose to prominence with her cover singles of folk-songs such as "Ve Assan Tenu Ki Akhna", "Ve main chori chori" and "Neyu La leya".

== Early life and career ==
After completing her bachelors of medicine and surgery from Frontier Medical College, she released her first album Dhola in 2008 and received critical appraisal. She completed her medical degree in 2011 and released three more albums including Nigah-e-Karam, Apna Mukaam Paida Kar and Kamli. Kamli added further recognition for her singing career and she received Best Emerging Talent – Music nomination at the 15th Lux Style Awards.

As a singer, she was inspired by Bade Ghulam Ali Khan, Abida Parveen, Ustad Muhammad Juman and the popular folk singer Reshma.

She is best known for her song ‘Peera Ho,’ which garnered broader recognition after it was sampled by Selena Gomez in her 2013 single ‘Come and Get It’.

In 2012, she made her Bollywood debut in film Cocktail, and was praised for her song "Luttna". In 2016, she recorded her first song "Naina Roye", for Pakistani film Maalik, that became popular. In the same year, she made her Coke Studio debut as a featured artist in season 9, as a part of team Faakhir.

== Discography ==
=== Film ===
- "Luttna" – Cocktail (2012)
- "Naina Roye" – Maalik (2016)

=== Coke Studio ===
- 2016 Jhaliya with Javed Bashir in Episode 6 : Coke Studio Pakistan (Season 9)

=== Albums ===
- Dhola
- Nigah-e-Karam
- Apna Mukaam Paida Kar
- Kamli

=== Singles ===
- "Kalaam-e-Faiz" (2015)
- "Safar ul Ishq" (2015)
- "Maza muft ka" (2014)

== Awards and nominations ==
Year	Awards	Category	Result	Ref(s)
2006	MTV Pakistan Awards	Best Singer – Female	Nominated	
2006	MTV Pakistan Awards	Best Breakthrough Performance	Nominated	
2015	Lux Style Awards	Best Emerging Talent – Music	Nominated	
