= Jabar Abbas =

Pakistani singer-songwriter and musician

- Born: Lahore, Pakistan
- Genres: Pop, classical
- Occupations: singer-songwriter, musician
- Instrument: vocals
- Years active: 1997–present
- Labels: Sahir Ali Bagga, Strings, Shani Arshad, Coke Studio
- Website: www.jabarabbas.com

Jabar Abbas is a Pakistani singer-songwriter and musician who started his career in 1997 as child artist. He gained notability during his presidential tenure of Nazir Ahmed Musical Society at Government College University, Lahore from 2003–2007. He then appeared in the political satire show Hum Sub Umeed Se Hain where he recorded more than three hundred parody songs. In 2012, he released his first single "Chan Mahi".

In 2013, he recorded songs for films Zinda Bhaag and Main Hoon Shahid Afridi. In 2016, Abbas marked his Coke Studio debut as a featured artist in season 9, as a part team Sheraz Uppal.

== Education ==
In 2003, Abbas attended Government College University, where he completed his Bachelor of Arts, and obtained his MA in Political Science in 2007.

== Career ==
Jabar also received the best composition award for his song "Pehle Nazar Ka Ishara" in a reality show Jazz Icon. Jabar paid tribute to two figures of music namely A.R Rehman and Reshma on Hum TV in 2009.

Abbas taught music at Aitchison College, Beaconhouse School System Lahore Grammar School and The City School for many years and has been associated with many music concerts. He is currently teaching physics at The City School Paragon Campus. In 2012, he recorded his first single "Chan Mahi" for his debut album, and was met with positive response. In 2013 he recorded songs for films Zinda Bhaag and Main Hoon Shahid Afridi that ad further acclaim in his career.

In 2016, he marked his Coke Studio debut as a featured artist in season 9, under team supervision of Sheraz Uppal.

== Discography ==
=== Singles ===
- "Chan Mahi" (2012)
- "SubhanAllah (2018)
- Tutarian (2018)
- Jugni (2020) - Ayaz Ismail, Hussain Ajani

=== Films ===
- Zinda Bhaag (2013)
- Main Hoon Shahid Afridi (2013)
- Lahore Se Aagey (2016)
- 3 bahadur: The Revenge Of Baba Balaam (2016)
- Punjab nahi Jaun gi (2017)

Na maloom Afraad 2 ( 2017 ) Azaadi (2018 ) Parwaz hai janoon (2018) Chhalawa ( 2019) Lal kabootar ( 2019 )

=== Television ===
- Hum Sub Umeed Se Hain
- Coke Studio: Season 9 (2016)
- Coke Studio: Season 10 (2017)
