= Ali Khan (singer) =

Pakistani, songwriter, and actor

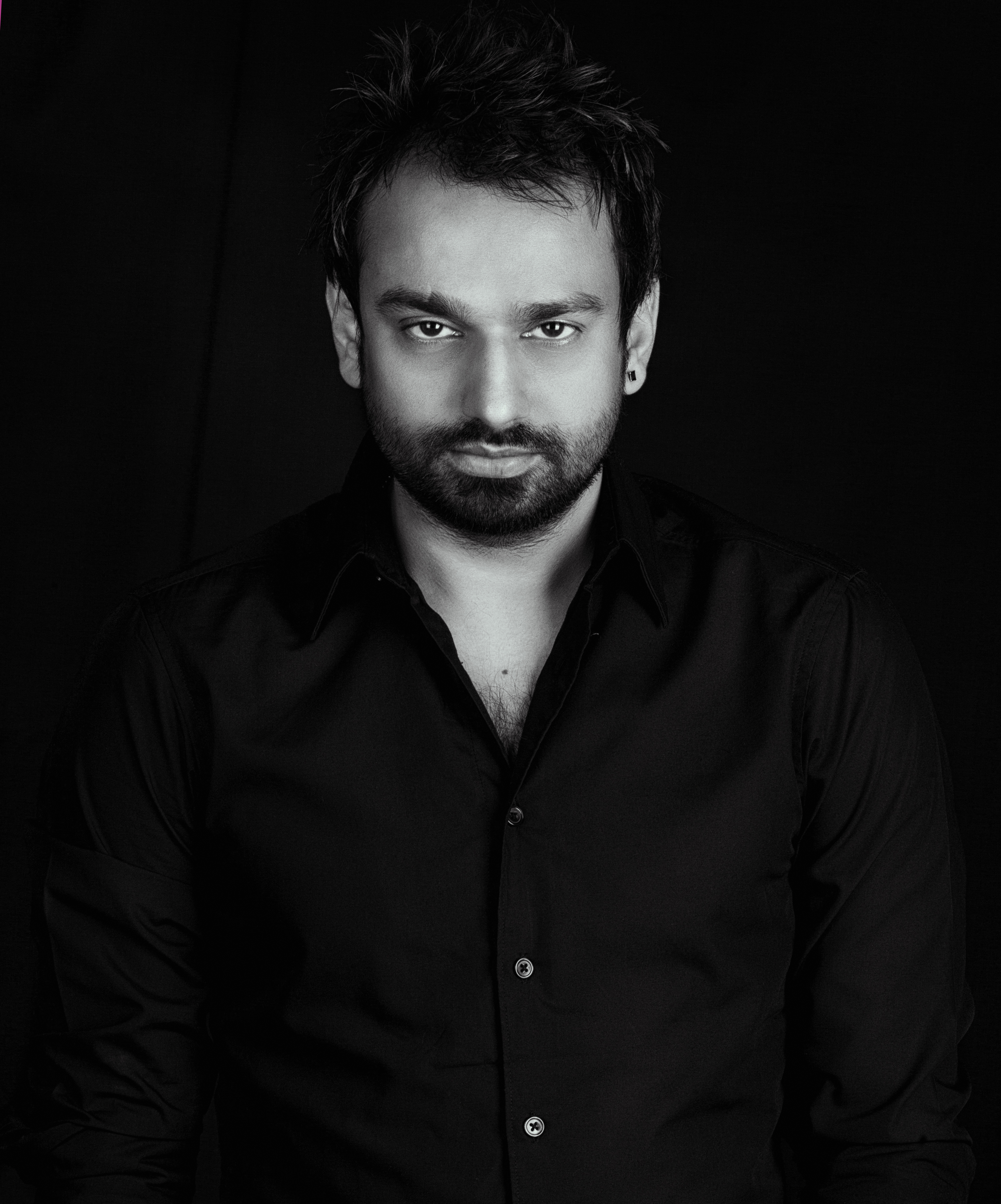
- Born: 21 October 1979 (age 46); Karachi, Pakistan
- Occupations: Singer, songwriter, musician, actor
- Notable work: Coke Studio Season 9 Nescafé Basement Season 5
- Musical career
- Genres: Pop, Ambient, Synthwave
- Website: alikhanworld.com

Ali Khan is a Pakistani singer&songwriter and musician. Rose to prominence in 90's boy band The Vibes, Khan established himself as a solo singer in 2000 with the release of his single "Surmai Ankhon Mein", that was well received by critics. In 2006, Khan released his second single "Saathiya" that became the most successful work of Khan to date, topping charts for several weeks and earning three nominations at TMA Awards 2007. He then recorded several covers and did playback singing for television series and films including Five Minarets in New York, Karadayı and Kaala Paisa Payar.

In 2011, Ali released his third single "Koi Aye Na" – earning him critical praise, and a cover of "Shamman Paiyan Tere Bina" as a tribute to NFK and Nitin Sawhney, the song ranked no. 7th on worldwide chart on ISINA. Khan's fourth single "Memories" also received acclaim. In 2016 Khan marked his Coke Studio debut as a featured artist in season 9, as a part team Jaffer Zaidi.

== Career ==
Ali started his career in 1990 when he performed at school's various functions and concerts. However, he was noted when he gain recognition as a part of 90's boy band The Vibes. In 2000, Ali released his first single "Surmai Ankhon Mein" as a solo artist that was well received by critics. With the hiatus of almost four years Ali released his second single "Saathiya" that earned him widespread acclaim and recognition. Song tops many charts and received three nominations at The Musik Awards 2007. In an interview Khan said, "I produced 'Saathiya' overnight, sitting in the studio at my place, I never thought the song would be such a hit and the positive response gave me a lot of confidence that I could create my own music.

In 2011, with the release of "Koi Aye Na", Ali received critical appraisal. In 2014, Ali released a cover of "Shamman Paiyan Tere Bina" as a tribute to NFK and Nitin Sawhney, the rendition was heavily praised by critics and ranked no. 7th on worldwide chart on ISINA. Khan fourth single "Memories" also received acclaim. Ali wanted to relaunch himself with the season 8 of Coke Studio but shows producers Faisal Kapadia and Bilal Maqsood didn't come on board with Ali's songs, clarifying Khan said, "It's not that they didn't like my music but I believe the producers were more inclined toward Sufi music last season." However, he marked himself as a featured artist with season 9, under Jaffer Zaidi. Currently he is producing his debut album, having been a part of many collaborations.

== Filmography ==
=== Film ===
- "Rang Dey" – Five Minarets in New York
- "Guzaarish" – Inteha (Original title: Gecenin Kanatlari)
- TBA – Dance Kahani
- Daal Chawal (as actor)

=== Television ===
- "Tha Woh Pyar" – Karadayı
- "Lamhe"- Kaala Paisa Payar
- Coke Studio (2016)

=== Discography ===
- "Surmai Ankhon Mein" (2000)
- "Saathiya" (2006)
- "Koi Aye Na" (2011)
- "Shaman"
- "Memories"
