= Punjab Nahi Jaungi =

2017 Pakistani film by Nadeem Baig

- Theatrical release poster
- Urdu: پنجاب نہیں جاؤں گی
- Directed by: Nadeem Baig; Muhammad Umer Jamal
- Written by: Khalil-ur-Rehman Qamar
- Produced by: Humayun Saeed; Salman Iqbal; Hassan Saeed; Shahzad Nasib
- Starring: Humayun Saeed; Mehwish Hayat; Urwa Hocane
- Cinematography: Suleman Razzaq
- Edited by: Rizwan AQ
- Music by: Shani Arshad
- Production companies: Six Sigma Plus; Salman Iqbal films
- Distributed by: ARY Films
- Release date: 1 September 2017 (Pakistan)
- Running time: 159 min
- Country: Pakistan
- Languages: Urdu; Punjabi
- Box office: Rs. 516.5 million (US$1.8 million)

Punjab Nahi Jaungi (lit. 'I won't go to Punjab'), is a 2017 Pakistani romantic comedy film directed by Nadeem Baig and written by Khalil-ur-Rehman Qamar. It stars Humayun Saeed and Mehwish Hayat alongside Sohail Ahmed, Saba Hameed, and Urwa Hocane in pivotal roles. The story is about a love triangle between the lead characters, and also exhibits the Punjabi culture of Pakistan. A spiritual spin-off to Punjab Nahi Jaungi was released in 2022 as London Nahi Jaunga, with Humayun Saeed and Mehwish Hayat returning in lead roles.

The film was released on Eid al-Adha, 1 September 2017, under the production banners of Humayun Saeed and Shahzad Nasib's Six Sigma Plus and was distributed by Salman Iqbal and Jerjees Seja's ARY Films. With a worldwide gross of over Rs. 51.65 crore, it remained the highest grossing Pakistani film until beaten by Jawani Phir Nahi Ani 2.

== Plot ==
The film starts with Fawad Khagga returning to Faisalabad from Lahore after completing his M.A. Fawad wants a love marriage with a beautiful girl. His cousin, Durdana Butt, loves him, but he doesn't love her back. Fawad's mother Firdous Khagga, likes Amal Dastoor, who has returned from London after studying economics. Fawad and Amal have a 100-year-old friendship. Firdous requests that Fawad's grandfather, Mehtab Khagga, ask Amal about marrying Fawad, but she refuses because she wants to marry her college friend Vasay, with whom she studied in London. After hearing that Amal has refused his proposal, a heartbroken Fawad goes to Karachi and tries to win her heart by telling her that he can give her his only property of buffaloes and dairy. She asks Vasay to give her his London apartment, but he refuses because that's the only property he has with him. After hearing that, Amal agrees to marry Fawad. On the day of marriage, Fawad gets drunk and tells his friends that he hasn't given Amal any property but has killed her by sticking her in sentiments. Amal hears this and gets heartbroken. Fawad tells Amal that whatever he said wasn't true, he was just showing off in front of his friends and asking for forgiveness. Amal tells him she will forgive him if he dives from the roof. Fawad dives from the roof but survives.

After Fawad recovers from his injuries, he takes Amal to his dairy, but she doesn't feel happy after seeing the condition of the dairy and buffaloes. She decides to renovate the dairy by importing a plant. Since she is busy with the Dairy's work, she is unable to give time to Fawad, due to which Fawad gets heartbroken. He hugs his cousin Durdana and asks her to help him because his heart is broken. Amal sees him hugging Durdana, gets heartbroken, and tells Fawad that she will get a divorce. After hearing this, Fawad gets angry and slaps Amal, after which she leaves him and goes back to Karachi. Now after some weeks, Fawad feels guilty and decides to go to Karachi and apologize to her but when he goes to her home. her family tells him that she has demanded a divorce from him. After hearing this Fawad decides to meet Amal but she is gone at Vasay's house. He goes to Vasay's house and tries to take Amal with him. Vasay and his friends try to stop him, but he beats them, after which the police arrive and arrest Fawad. After getting released from jail, Fawad again tries to apologize to Amal, but she doesn't forgive him and asks for divorce one final time; otherwise, they will meet in court. Fawad agrees to give her divorce only if she comes to Punjab; at first, she refuses. Fawad leaves, but Vasay and his friends stop him. He allows Vasay to beat him. Amal then agrees to come to Punjab. Fawad apologizes to his and Amal's family after signing the divorce papers and leaves. Fawad is about to dive again from the roof but Amal stops him, forgives him, claiming that those were not divorce papers but a promise that they would love each other immensely and they embrace each other. The film ends with Fawad and Amal hugging each other.

== Cast ==
- Humayun Saeed as Chaudhry Fawad Khagga
- Sohail Ahmed as Mehtab Khagga
- Mehwish Hayat as Amal Dastoor
- Saba Hameed as Firdous Khagga
- Navid Shahzad as Bebo Ji aka Nikatara
- Urwa Hocane as Durdana Butt
- Ahmed Ali Butt as Shafique Ahmed
- Waseem Abbas as Jawad Khagga
- Azfar Rehman as Vasay
- Behroze Sabzwari as Dastoor Ahmed
- Safina Sheikh as Mrs. Dastoor Ahmed
- Bashar Amir Shafi as Farhan (Dastoor's son) (child artist)
- Adnan Shah Tipu as Shaukat Ali (cameo appearance)
- Syed Mohammad Ahmed as a lawyer (special appearance)
- Marina Khan (as a lady in the restaurant) (special appearance)
- Fahad Rehmani (as a man in the restaurant) (special appearance)
- Farhan Saeed (special appearance in song "Rab Rakha")
- Ushna Shah (special appearance in song "Raat Ka Nasha")
- Muhammad Umer Jamal

== Production ==
=== Development and casting ===
The film was a joint production between ARY Films and Humayun Saeed's production house Six Sigma Plus. The film also has renowned Pakistani television actors, such as Urwa Hocane, Ahmed Ali Butt, Saba Hameed, Sohail Ahmed, Azfar Rehman, Naveed Shehzad, Behroze Sabzwari, Safeena Sheikh, Samina Peerzada and Waseem Abbass.

Iman Ali was first chosen as the female lead but was replaced by Mehwish Hayat. However, Saeed later clarified that Iman Ali was never officially a part of the film and that they were just in talks, and that he and Iman Ali mutually agreed that she would not be cast in this film. Sohai Ali Abro was initially approached for Durdana's role which she refused to do. Talking about this, Saeed asserted, "We did approach Sohai for Urwa's role but she wasn't comfortable doing it. Maybe she expected a bigger role and this just wasn't delivering it."

=== Filming ===
The filming took place in the city of Faisalabad, while architectural masterpieces from Bahawalpur, like Darbar Mahal, Bara Dari and Gulzar Mahal were used as Family House (Hawaili) of Fawad Khagga . Most of the filming took place in the cities of Faisalabad, Lahore and Karachi.

== Release ==
The film's trailer was released online on 6 July 2017. Within 48 hours, it had over 1 million views and trended at number 1 on YouTube Pakistan for several days and has also crossed up to 6 million views till date. The film released worldwide on the festival of Eid al-Adha, 1 September 2017. The film had a premiere event at Nuplex Cinema, Karachi, on 29 August 2017.

== Reception ==
=== Box office ===
Punjab Nahi Jaungi recorded the biggest Single day for any Pakistani film with collecting Rs. 2.80 crore. This record was broken by Jawani Phir Nahi Ani 2 soon, with collecting Rs. 2.99 crore. The film crossed the Rs. 156.5 crore gross mark right after its opening extended weekend; on Tuesday, 5 September. It collected Rs. 21.5 crore within a week of its release. It became the first Pakistani film to cross Rs. 30 crore within ten days. An official report on 26 December said that it became the first Pakistani film to cross the Rs. 50 crore mark. It made a total gross of Rs 35.85 crores locally and Rs 15.80 crores from overseas with a worldwide total of Rs 51.65 crores.

On 25 April 2018, BOD reported that the film became the highest grosser at the local box office, after collecting more than Rs. 340 crore in its thirty-four week run. It also reportedly left behind Bollywood film, Baadshaaho, at the UK box office with a record breaking collection. The domestic record was then broken by 2018 Indian film Sanju within its fourth weekend in Pakistan.

=== Critical reception ===
It received positive reviews from critics. Rahul Aijaz of The Express Tribune rated the film 4 out of 5 stars and said, "a fine line (in terms of story) between turning ridiculous and falling over, yet it somehow manages to keep its balance and not trip often". Hamna Zubair of DAWN Images praised the performance of Saeed and also his chemistry with Hayat and said that the film's "comedy works", but when a "slap made an appearance... this act of violence... almost ruined" the film. Shahjehan Saleem of Something Haute rated the film 4 out of 5 stars and said that "the film soars high" because of "the cast's stellar job" and "the script", and it "is so much more than just another glitzy show of emotions".

Omair Alavi of Samaa TV rated the film 4 out of 5 stars, saying that it "has a message as well as entertainment value". However, he noted that the roles of Humayun Saeed and Ahmed Ali Butt were hard to accept. Mahwash Ajaz of Dunya News rated it 3.5 out of 5 stars praising the performances of Saeed, Hayat and Hocane and noted that the film may has "some fairly strong progressive storylines" but with some problems, while "The film's feel, the inside jokes, the heavily accented English, breathtaking cinematography,... tawdry finery, danceable songs, relatable comedy and the visual treat" all are "paisa vusool". Rabiya Maqbool writing for the website Bolo Jawan praised the performances of Saeed and Hocane, stating that the director "has succeeded once again in piecing together a film which is satisfyingly refreshing and a very welcome addition" to cinema.

=== Accolades ===
Ceremony	Won	Nominated
17th Lux Style Awards	Best Film; Humayun Saeed – Best Actor; Nadeem Baig – Best Director; Urwa Hocane – Best Supporting Actress	Mehwish Hayat – Best Actress; Sohail Ahmed – Best Supporting Actor; Nirmal Roy – Best Female Singer for "Raunaq e Ashiqui"
Pakistan International Film Festival	Best Film; Nadeem Baig – Best Director; Khalil-ur-Rehman Qamar – Best Script	Humayun Saeed – Best Actor; Shani Arshad – Best Music

- Jury Special Award; first Shanghai Cooperation Organization (SCO) Film Festival in Qingdao, China

== Soundtrack ==
Punjab Nahi Jaungi

Soundtrack album by various artists
- Released: August 2017
- Recorded: 2016–2017
- Genre: Feature film soundtrack
- Length: 36:12
- Label: ARY Films
- Producer: Six Sigma Plus
External audio
- Album on SoundCloud

Singles from Punjab Nahi Jaungi
- 1. "Rab Rakha" Released: 19 August 2017

The film soundtrack album was released by ARY Films in August 2017. It consists of seven songs composed by various artists. There is a single music video from film soundtrack directed by Parmesh Adiwal, titled "Rab Rakha", and featuring Farhan Saeed.

No.	Title	Lyrics	Music	Singer(s)	Length
1.	"Rab Rakha"	Farhan Saeed	Ali Mustafa	Farhan Saeed	5:02
2.	"Ae Dil"	Shakeel Sohail	Shiraz Uppal	Shiraz Uppal, Jonita Gandhi	4:39
3.	"Ranjha"	Shakeel Sohail	Shiraz Uppal	Shiraz Uppal, Asrar	5:55
4.	"Raunaq e Ashiqui"	Shakeel Sohail	Shiraz Uppal	Nirmal Roy	4:58
5.	"Raat Ka Nasha"	Ahmad Ali Butt, Hasil Kurashi	Ahmad Ali Butt	Damia Farooq, Rizwan, Ahmad Ali Butt	4:24
6.	"24/7 Lak Hilna"	Shakeel Sohail, Sahir Ali Bagga	Sahir Ali Bagga	Meesha Shafi, Sahir Ali Bagga	5:36
7.	"Tere Naal"	Sabir Zafar	Shani Arshad	Shafqat Amanat Ali Khan	5:38
Total length:					36:12

== See also ==
- London Nahi Jaunga
- List of Pakistani films of 2017
