= Laal Rang =

2016 Indian crime drama film

- Theatrical release poster
- Directed by: Syed Ahmad Afzal
- Written by: Syed Ahmad Afzal; Pankaj Matta
- Produced by: Nitika Thakur, Krian Media
- Starring: Randeep Hooda; Akshay Oberoi; Rajneesh Duggal; Pia Bajpai; Meenakshi Dixit; Shreya Narayan
- Cinematography: Dhirendra Shukla
- Edited by: Shounok Ghosh
- Music by: Mathias Duplessy; Shiraz Uppal; Vipin Patwa
- Production company: Krian Media
- Distributed by: Krian Media
- Release date: 22 April 2016
- Running time: 150 minutes
- Country: India
- Language: Hindi
- Budget: ₹ 10 crore
- Box office: est.₹ 2.26 crore

Laal Rang (transl. Red colour) is a 2016 Indian Hindi-language black comedy crime drama film directed by Syed Ahmad Afzal and produced by Nitika Thakur and Krian Media. Randeep Hooda, Akshay Oberoi and Piaa Bajpai star in the lead roles. Set in Haryana, the film depicts the theft of blood from blood banks and how the lives of two friends involved in the trade get affected. The film was released on 22 April 2016. It received mixed reviews, with praise for the story, performances and production values but criticism towards the slow screenplay. In later years it has gained a Cult status.

== Plot ==
Rajesh, a youngster, is in love with fellow student Poonam. Rajesh meets Shankar, the owner of an illegal blood bank. Shankar has recently had his heart broken by a Punjabi girl called Rashi, whom he still misses. Though initially, Rajesh is not aware of Shankar's illegal trades, he likes it the instant he learns about it and becomes involved in earning quick money to impress Poonam. Slowly, as the business kicks off, Rajesh starts showing off his money to Poonam. The cops, who have a hint of this business, are also closing in on the illegal activity. Shankar confesses his crime and is arrested, saving Rajesh and Poonam's relationship. Five years later, Shankar is released from prison, and he reunites with Rajesh and Poonam. The couple has a son that they have named after Shankar.

== Cast ==
- Randeep Hooda as Shankar Singh Malik
- Akshay Oberoi as Rajesh Dhiman
- Rajniesh Duggall as SP Gajraj Singh
- Pia Bajpai as Poonam Sharma
- Meenakshi Dixit as Raashi
- Shreya Narayan as Neelam
- Rajendra Sethi as Pushpendra
- Ashutosh Kaushik as Vishnu
- Priya Gupta as Sunita
- Jaihind Kumar as Harnaam
- Abhimanue Arun as Suraj aka Draculla
- Kumar Saurabh as Shani Baba
- Rehan Kidwai as Dr. Sabharwal
- Sanjay Dumroo as Mithuniya
- Kulvinder Baksshish as Naresh
- Pall Singh as Prakash
- Atul Chouthmal as Sub Inspector Swaraj
- Pushkar Anand as Prahlad

== Production ==
The film was largely filmed in and around Karnal, Haryana.

== Release ==
=== Critical reception ===
Mohar Basu of The Times of India gave it 2 stars out of 5, wrote that film is half-baked and unconvincing. Despite the grit, it never becomes a riveting film. Rohit Vats of Hindustan Times gave it 3 stars out of 5, wrote that movie has a shade grey and is much more high voltage than an ordinary thriller. Shubhra Gupta of The Indian Express gave it 1.5 stars out of 5, quoted that film is meant to be based on two `real life’ incidents, but it doesn't tell us which. Anna MM Vetticad of Firstpost criticized that title is hot but film is not.

Namrata Thakker of Rediff.com praised actor and criticized film by giving it 2.5 stars out of 5. Saibal Chatterjee of NDTV said that the characters aren't insignificant.

== Music ==
The music for Laal Rang was composed by Shiraz Uppal, Vipin Patwa & Mathias Duplessy. The music rights of the film were acquired by T-Series.

No.	Title	Lyrics	Music	Singer(s)	Length
1.	"Bhaang Ragad Ke"	Mange Ram Koch	Vipin Patwa	Vikas Kumar, Vipin Patwa	5:54
2.	"Bawli Booch"	Vikas Kumar	Mathias Duplessy	Vikas Kumar	3:49
3.	"Mera Mann"	Shakeel Sohail	Shiraz Uppal	Shiraz Uppal, Kashif Ali	4:21
4.	"Aye Khuda"	Kausar Munir	Shiraz Uppal	Mukhtiyar Ali, Sameer Khan	3:18
5.	"Laali"	Kausar Munir	Mathias Duplessy	Sameer Khan	3:23
6.	"Kharch Karod"	Vikas Kumar, (Rap By Fazilpuria)	Vipin Patwa	Vikas Kumar, Fazilpuria, Randeep Hooda, Vipin Patwa	2:24
7.	"Kharch Karod (Slow)"	Vikas Kumar	Vipin Patwa	Vikas Kumar	2:26
Total length:					15:52

=== Box office ===
According to Box Office India, movie collected ₹2.68 crore in its lifetime on a budget of 10 crores.

== Sequel ==
Laal Rang 2: Khoon Chusva, a sequel to the film by director Afzal was announced in 2023.
