= Saieen Zahoor =

Singer

Saieen Zahoor khan
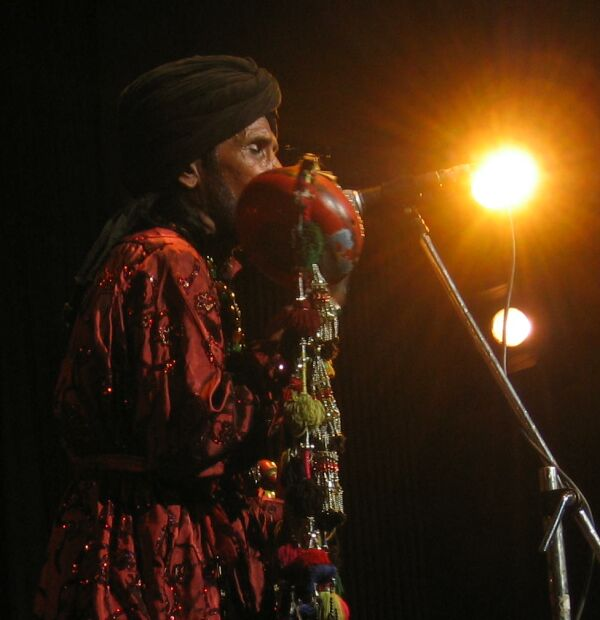
- Born: 1936 (age 89–90); Sulemanki, Depalpur Tehsil, Okara district, Pakistan
- Occupations: Folk; Musician, Folk Singer
- Known for: His unique style with Ektara, Tumbi
- Awards: Pride of Performance Award by the President of Pakistan in 2020 "Best Voice of the Year" Award in 2006 by BBC Music

Saieen Zahoor Ahmed or Ali Saain Shafiu (Punjabi: سائیں ظہور, born 1936) is a Punjabi Sufi musician from Pakistan. He has spent most of his life singing in Sufi shrines, and didn't produce a record until 2006, when he was nominated for the BBC World Music awards based on word of mouth.

He emerged as the BBC's "best voice of the year" in 2006. Saieen is not his first name but a Punjabi and Sindhi honorific title and is also spelled as Sain. In the Muslim society of Punjab, the honorofic is often associated with people who have given up the worldly pleasures for a more spiritual lifestyle.

== Early life and career ==
Born in Sulaimanki, a village near Haveli Lakha of Okara district in the province of Punjab, Zahoor Ahmad was the youngest child in a rural peasant family. He is said to have started singing at the age of five, and from that early age, he had dreamt of a hand beckoning him towards a shrine. He started roaming the Sufi shrines of Sindh, Punjab, making a living through singing. Zahoor claims that as he was walking past a small shrine in south Punjab town of Uch Sharif (known for its Sufi traditions), when "someone waved at me with his hand, inviting me in, and I suddenly realized that it was this hand which I saw in my dream.

For some time, he studied music under Raunka Ali of Patiala Gharana, whom he met at Bulleh Shah's dargah (shrine), and who became his first teacher for Sufi verses. He also studied music with other Uch Sharif-based musicians.

Although not literate, Zahoor is known for his memory of song lyrics; mostly he sings compositions of the major Sufi poets, Bulleh Shah, Shah Badakhshi, Muhammad Qadiri, Sultan Bahu and others.

Sain is famous for his performances at Coke Studio (Pakistan). He had also performed in Australia and New Zealand in October and November 2014. In 2009, he performed at the folk music festival arranged by the Rafi Peer Theatre Workshop in Lahore and was reportedly a crowd puller.

== Musical style ==
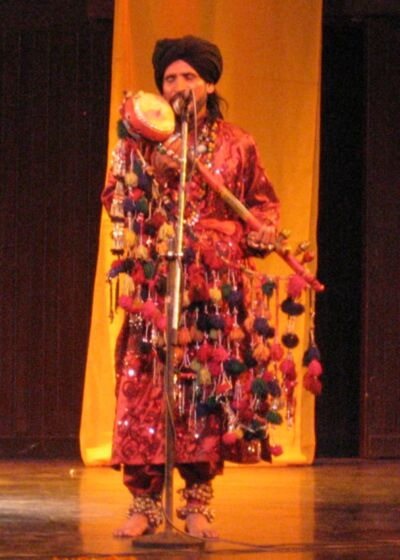
Zahoor performing with his decorated Ektara (a kind of lute, normally with a single string, but he uses a three-stringed version). Notice the long kurta and the ghungroos (anklet bells).

For most of his life Zahoor performed mainly in dargahs (Sufi tombs/shrines) and festivals, and in the streets. He adopted the folk instrument Ektara (ek= one, tar = string), in its three-stringed version called Tumbi, as his main instrument. Like some traditions of Sufi music, he has a passionate, high-energy style of singing, often dancing in a frenzied style with the tassels on his instrument whirling around him. His typical outfit includes embroidered (kurta), beads, tightly bound turban, as well as ghungroos (anklet-bells worn by dancers). His voice has an earthy tone, almost cracking at the edges, but capable of a wide vocal and emotional range. "His piercing chiseled features are a regular sight on Pakistani TV and he has been the subject of at least one documentary."

In 1989, he performed on a concert stage for the first time at the All Pakistan Music Conference, which brought him into musical prominence. Subsequently he has emerged as a leading performer in Pakistan, frequently appearing on TV and in concerts. Zahoor has also given concerts in UK, Japan, Ireland, Canada and Norway.

Sufi singing is focused on poetry with themes of devotional love, which shares much with Persian mystic poets like Rumi and with other South Asian traditions such as the Bhakti cult. Some argue that Sufi traditions highlight a softer, multi-cultural aspect of Islam, which counters "the extremism of the mullahs who use the mosques to spread ill-will" against other cultural groups, according to some organizers of Saieen Zahoor's concerts.

In 2006, Zahoor released an album titled Awazay ("Sounds") through Matteela Records. In 2007, he helped produce the soundtrack to the Pakistani film Khuda Ke Liye (2007).

He sang an OST in 2011 for West Is West a British comedy-drama film, which is a sequel to the 1999 comedy East Is East. Saieen Zahoor has performed in Norway, Belgium, Dubai, Malaysia, China and India.

== Songs ==
- Toomba (Coke Studio Season 2)
- Allah Hoo
- Nachna Painda Hai
- Tere Ishq Nachaya
- Ek Alif (Coke Studio Season 2)
- Allah Hoo (Coke Studio Season 6)
- Rabba Ho (Coke Studio Season 6)
- Alif Allah Nu (duckU Records)
- Duniya Chalo Chali Da Mela (duckU Records)
- Maaye Ni Main Kinu Akhan (duckU Records)
- Lagi Bina/ Chal Mele Noon Challiye (Coke Studio Season 9)
- Mirzya Title song - 2016
- Dill Da Kabah

== Films ==
His music has been used in the following films

- West is West (2010) – Toomba and Ek Alif
- Mirzya – Teen Gawah

== Awards and recognition ==
- Special Mention by the Aga Khan Music Awards in 2022.
- Pride of Performance Award by the President of Pakistan in 2020.
- "Best Voice of the Year" Award in 2006 by BBC Music.
