= Shani Arshad =

Pakistani film and TV musician

- Born: Zeeshan Haider; Karachi, Pakistan
- Origin: Karachi, Pakistan
- Occupations: Music Composer, Record producer, Lyricist, Singer, Music arranger
- Instruments: Keyboards, Bass, Drums, Tabla
- Years active: 1995 – present

Shani Arshad is a Pakistani film music director, songwriter, TV jingle composer, playback singer and record producer. He has composed music for various television serials and films including Actor in Law, Na Maloom Afraad, Load Wedding, Teefa in Trouble, and The Donkey King. As a music composer, he has made 16 super hit films' background score and 18 television soundtracks. He has also directed 11 musical compositions in Coke Studio (Pakistan). Shani Arshad also made orchestral music with Hungarian orchestra "Budapest Film Orchestra" for the film The Donkey King. He earned wider recognition for composing the OST of the popular Pakistani drama serial Tere Bin

== Career ==
Shani Arshad was born in the home of musician Ustad Arshad Ali. He started his career as a keyboard player at an early age 15. He joined Eagle Record Company as a remix producer in 1998, where he was asked to make Vital Signs band's remix album, which became Shani's introduction to the pop industry. He has worked with well-known Pakistani musicians including Junaid Jamshed, Atif Aslam, Abida Parveen, Rahat Fateh Ali Khan, Ali Zafar, Shafqat Amanat Ali Khan, Zeb Bangash, Meesha Shafi, QB, Hadiqa Kiyani, Shehzad Roy, Fakhir, Strings, Haroon, Jimmy Attre, Raheem Shah, Najam Sheraz, Fakhar-e-Alam, Aamir Zaki, and Sajjad Ali. Two times ARY Films Awards winner for best music and two times winner for best OST and best jingle at Hum TV Awards and SEPMA. Shani also has been nominated thrice for Lux Style Awards and twice for The Muzik Awards. He also appeared in #CokeStudio9 and #CokeStudio10 as a singer and music producer.

== Filmography ==
- Main Hoon Shahid Afridi (2013)
- Na Maloom Afraad (2014)
- Jawani Phir Nahi Ani (2015)
- Bin Roye (2015)
- Actor in Law (2016)
- Na Maloom Afraad 2 (2017)
- Punjab Nahi Jaungi (2017)
- 7 Din Mohabbat In (2018)
- Teefa in Trouble (2018)
- Load Wedding (2018)
- Jawani Phir Nahi Ani 2 (2018)
- The Donkey King (2018)
- Sherdil (2019)
- Ishrat Made in China (2022)
- Dum Mastam (2022)
- Quaid-e-Azam Zindabad (2022)
- London Nahi Jaunga (2022)
- Money Back Guarantee (2023)
- VIP (2023)
- Teri Meri Kahaniyaan (2023)

== Television ==
- Geo News Music ID
- TV One News Music ID
- Dunya News Music ID
- Har Pal Geo Music ID
- Geo Super Theme Song ("Jiyo Tou Aisay") (also singer)

== Coke Studio Composer ==
Shani Arshad composed the following songs:

- "Nimma Nimma" (composer and singer)
- "Julie" sung by Ali Zafar
- "Meri Meri" sung by Rizwan Butt and Sara Haider
- "Bholay Bhalay" Saiyan sung by Meesha Shafi
- "Maula-e-Kull" sung by Abida Parveen
- "Lathay Di Chadar Uttay" sung by QB and Farhan Saeed
- "Sadaa" sung by Rahat Fateh Ali Khan
- "Maula Tera Noor" sung by Shafqat Amanat Ali
- "Bol" sung by Shafqat Amanat Ali
- "Aaj Rung Hai" sung by Amjad Sabri and Rahat Fateh Ali Khan (with Shani Arshad as one of the musicians)

== Film songs as a singer ==
| Song | Film |
|---|---|
| "Actor in Law" | Actor In Law |
| "Chal Hug Lay" | Na Maloom Afraad 2 |
| "Faqeeran" | Load Wedding |
| "Ishq Larra" | 7 Din Mohabbat In |
| "Zid Pe Ara" | Khel Khel Mein |
| Khel Khel Mein | Khel Khel Mein |
| Harry | VIP |
| Chill Maro | VIP |
| Kar Hosh | VIP |
| VIP | VIP |

== TV soundtracks ==
- Tum Mere Kya Ho
- Dayar-e-Dil
- Khwab Saraye
- Zindagi Gulzar Hai
- Mohabbat Subh Ka Sitara
- Neelum Kinarey
- Jaye Kahan Yeh Dil
- Muqabil
- Ek Thi Marium
- Meri Guriya
- Khudparast
- Koi Chand Rakh
- Ramz-e-Ishq
- Dil Ruba
- Raaz-e-Ulfat
- Fitoor
- Mere Apne
- Tere Bin (2022 TV series)
- Behroop
- Siyani
- Farq
- Zakham
- Tere Bin
- Khuda Janwar (2025 TBA TV serial)

== Film soundtracks ==
- Khatta Meetha - music director for "Bullshit" song

== Awards and recognition ==
- Best Music Award by ARY Film Awards for Shani Arshad for the soundtrack of Jawani Phir Nahi Ani (2015 film)
- Best Music Award by ARY Film Awards for Shani Arshad for the soundtrack of Main Hoon Shahid Afridi (2013 film)
- Best OST Award by Hum Tv Awards for Shani Arshad for the soundtrack of Diyar-e-Dil (2016 film)
- Best Jingle Composer Award by Shaan-e-Pakistan Music Achievement Awards for Shani Arshad for the soundtrack of 7UP (TVC) (2018)
