= Ahmed Jahanzeb =

Pakistani singer

- Also known as: The Wonder Boy
- Born: Ahmed Jehanzeb Usmani; Karachi, Pakistan
- Genres: Pop, Classical
- Occupations: Singer-songwriter, musician
- Years active: 1984–present
- Labels: Sound Master, Fire Records

Ahmed Jahanzeb Usmani (Urdu: احمد جہاں زیب عثمانی) is a Pakistani pop singer and composer. He was born in Karachi, Sindh, Pakistan.

He was known also as AJ and Wonderboy as he released his first record at the very young age of 8. Jahanzeb is one of the few pop singers of the country, who have trained in classical music and that is why he mostly sings soul-stirring, slow songs. Jahanzeb was trained under the guidance of Ustad Rais Khan, who made him his shagird (pupil) in a ceremony called Rasm-e-Gandha Bandhi held at the Sheraton Hotel in 1988. The ceremony, one of its kind to be ever held in Pakistan, was attended by celebrities, dignitaries and media people.

== Live concerts ==
Ahmed Jahanzeb is a familiar name in the touring circuit of Pakistani pop singers, He has done over 2000 shows and has shared the stage with musicians like AR Rahman, Sonu Nigam, Sunidhi Chauhan, Ali Azmat and Strings (band).

== Coke Studio (Pakistan) artist ==
Ahmed Jahanzeb made his debut on Coke Studio (Pakistan) in 2016 as one of their featured artists. He also has his own studio producing documentaries and films for television.

== Albums and OSTs ==
- Wonder Boy (album) (1987)
- Parastish (2003)
- Daira (album) (2004)
- Burning Borders-BBC (2005)
- Laut Aao (2008)
- Khuda aur Muhabbat (2011)

== OSTs and singles ==
- Tera Mera Hai Pyar Amar - Ishq Murshid (2023)
- Ishq Murshid Mera – Ishq Murshid (2023)
- Pyar Ke Sadqay OST/ Title song composer and singer.[ 2020 ]
- Meer Abru OST /Title song composer and singer. [ 2019 ]
- Coke Studio Pakistan (2017) – Allah hu Akbar featuring Shafqat Amanat Ali, Ahmed Jahanzeb
- Coke Studio Pakistan (2016) – Khaki Banda featuring Umair Jaswal, Ahmed Jahanzeb
- Piya Ke Duwaaray – OST Dusri Biwi (2014)
- Laila Majnoon – OST (2000)
- Ik Baar Kaho Tum Meri Ho – Single (2001–2002)
- Sheeshay Ka Mahal – OST (2003)
- Tu Jo Nahi
- Mujhay Pyar Chahye – OST (2004)
- Dard Itna Tha – OST (2005)
- Ajeeb Zindagi Hai – Single (2006)
- Socha Na Tha – Single (2006)
- Aisa Bhi Hota Hai – OST (2007)
- Hamaray Hain feat. Shuja Haider – OST Khuda Kay Liye (2007)
- Bandya Ho featuring Shuja Haider – OST Khuda Kay Liye (2007)
- Tiluk Kamod OST – Khuda Kay Liye (2007)
- Teri Aag
- Mumkin Hai OST – Bol (2010)
- ..Ik Nai Dunya.... OST
- Sab Se Pehle Pakistan

== Filmography ==
Dramas & Films
Year	Title	Role	Additional notes
2008-09	The Ghost	Mansoor Kareem	
2011	Khuda Aur Muhabbat	Abdullah	Geo Entertainment
2010	Bol		A Shoaib Mansoor film
2007	Khuda Kay Liye		A Shoaib Mansoor film
