= Shiraz Uppal =

Pakistani singer

Shiraz Uppal شیراز اپل
- Born: 29 January 1976 (age 50); Lahore, Punjab, Pakistan
- Origin: Lahore, Punjab, Pakistan
- Genres: Pop Music, Qawwali, Film Score, Electronic Dance Music, Sound Track
- Occupations: Singer, composer, music producer
- Instruments: Vocals, guitars, keyboards
- Years active: 1998–present
- Labels: Fire Records, Sadaf Stereo, T-Series, Eros, S.U Studios, Saregama, Sony Music India, Coke Studio
- Spouse: Ayesha Shiraz (m. 1999)

Shiraz Uppal (Urdu: شیراز اپل; born 29 January 1976) is a Pakistani singer, songwriter and music producer.

His popular songs are "Tu Kuja Man Kuja", "Tera Te Mera", "Raanjhanaa", "Mann Ja Ve", "Roya Re", "Rabba", "Saiyan Ve", "3 Bahadur" and many more. He did his MBA in 1998 and then pursued his passion for music.

Shiraz owns a state-of-the-art audio studio in Lahore called S.U. Studios where he composes, produces, records, mixes and masters all of his songs and those of the others. S.U. Studios is known for producing high-end sound. He also produced Tajdar-e-Haram, the biggest hit of Coke Studio (season 8), performed by Atif Aslam.

Shiraz Uppal also composed and produced 5 songs in Coke Studio Season 9. He also sang the song "Tu Hi Tu" with Mehwish Hayat and "Tu Kuja" with Rafaqat Ali Khan.

Shiraz has composed and given music into Atif Aslam's song "Pehli Dafa".

== Discography ==
=== Albums & Singles ===
- Tu Hai Meri (Album 2001)
- Tera Tay Mera (Album 2003)
- Jhuki Jhuki (Album 2005)
- Ankahi (Album 2009)
- "Sunn Yara" (Single 2023)
- "Juliet" (Single 2023)
- "Bhula Betha" (Single 2023)

=== Pakistani film songs (music director) ===
Year	Song	Movie	Singer(s)
2011	"Hona Tha Pyar"	Bol	Atif Aslam, Hadiqa Kiani
2015	"3 Bahadur" (Title Track)	3 Bahadur	Shiraz Uppal
2015	Raunaqein	3 Bahadur	Shiraz Uppal
2015	"Bin Roye" (Title Track)	Bin Roye	Shiraz Uppal
2015	"Ballay Ballay"	Bin Roye	Harshdeep Kaur & Shiraz Uppal
2015	"Lahoriya"	Karachi Se Lahore	Shiraz Uppal, Ali Hamza, Ali Noor
2015	"Aja re Aja"	Karachi Se Lahore	Shiraz Uppal, Ali Hamza, Ali Noor
2015	"Tutti Frutti"	Karachi Se Lahore	Ayesha Omar & Shiraz Uppal
2015	"Rabbi Ralli"	Karachi Se Lahore	Ali Hamza
2016	"Lar Gaiyyan"	Dobara Phir Se	Zarish Hafeez & Shiraz Uppal
2016	"Jhoomay Bar Bar"	3 Bahadur: The Revenge of Baba Balaam	Jabar Abbas
2016	"Band Baj Gaya"	3 Bahadur: The Revenge of Baba Balaam	Ali Gul Pir, Bassam Shazl, Mustafa Changazi & Badar Qureshi
2016	"Kalabaaz Dil"	Lahore Se Aagey	Aima Baig
2016	"Be Fiqriyan"	Lahore Se Aagey	Aima Baig
2016	"Ehl e Dil"	Lahore Se Aagey	Aima Baig
2016	"Zara Si Laga Lo"	Lahore Se Aagey	Shiraz Uppal
2017	"Ranjha"	Punjab Nahi Jaungi	Asrar & Shiraz Uppal
2017	"Ae dil"	Punjab Nahi Jaungi	Shiraz Uppal & Jonita Gandhi
2017	"Raunaq-e-Aashiqui"	Punjab Nahi Jaungi	Nirmal Roy
2018	"Saudai Saiyan"	7 Din Mohabbat In	Neha Chaudhry
2018	"Behka Re"	Jawani Phir Nahi Ani 2	Shiraz Uppal
2019	"Chhalawa"	Chhalawa	Nirmal Roy, Jabar Abbas, Neha Chaudhry
2019	"Chirriya"	Chhalawa	Neha Chaudhry
2019	"Madhaniyan"	Chhalawa	Haadi Uppal & Neha Chaudhry
2022	"Larki Achari"	Dum Mastam	Shiraz Uppal & Neha Chaudhry
2025	"Bekhabreya"	Love Guru	Shiraz Uppal & Nirmal Roy

=== Bollywood songs ===
Year	Song	Movie	Singer(s)	Music director
2001	"Shakalaka Baby"	Nayak	Shiraz Uppal, Vasundhara Das & Praveen Mani	A. R. Rahman
2003	"Secret of Success"	Boys (Dubbed version)	Shiraz Uppal, Kunal Ganjawala, Blaaze & Vasundhara Das	A. R. Rahman
2007	"Roya Re"	Dhokha	Shiraz Uppal	Shiraz Uppal
2010	"Rabba"	Aashayein	Shiraz Uppal	Shiraz Uppal
2013	"Raanjhanaa"	Raanjhanaa	Jaswinder Singh, Shiraz Uppal	A. R. Rahman
2014	"Daata Di Divaani"	Youngistaan	Shiraz Uppal, Rafaqat Ali Khan	Shiraz Uppal
2014	"Mere Khuda"	Youngistaan	Shiraz Uppal	Shiraz Uppal
2014	"Alaahda"	Lekar Hum Deewana Dil	Shiraz Uppal	A. R. Rahman
2014	"Aiyla"	I (Dubbed version)	Shiraz Uppal, Natalie Di Luccio	A. R. Rahman
2016	"Mera Mann"	Laal Rang	Kashif Ali	Shiraz Uppal
2017	"Pehli Dafa"	T Series	Atif Aslam	Shiraz Uppal

=== Pakistani drama songs ===
Year	Song	Drama Serial	Singer(s)
2010	"Pehla Pehla Pyar"	Pehla Pehla Pyar	Shiraz Uppal
2012	"Ishq Samandar"	Ishq Samandar	Shiraz Uppal
2012	"Naina Tere"	Mera Pehla Pyar	Shiraz Uppal, Qurat-ul-Ain Balouch
2014	"Reza Reza"	Milan	Shiraz Uppal, Neeti Mohan
2020	"Yeh Dil Mera"	Yeh Dil Mera	Shiraz Uppal
2021	"Qissa Meherbano Ka"	Qissa Meherbano Ka	Nirmal Roy
2022	"Murshad Re"	Bakhtawar	Shiraz Uppal

== Accolades ==
Year	Award Ceremony	Category	Film	Song	Result	Reference(s)
2006	ARY Music Awards	Best Bhangra Song		Saiyyan Ve	Won	
2010	Mirchi Music Awards	Upcoming Music Composer of The Year	Aashayein	"Rabba"	Won	
2018	IPPA Awards	Best Singer		Tu Hee Tu	Won	
2023	IPPA Awards	Best Singer			Won	
