= Coke Studio Pakistan =

Pakistani music-television programme

- کوک اِسٹوڈیو
- Created by: Rohail Hyatt; Nadeem Zaman
- Starring: Featured Artists
- Country of origin: Pakistan
- No. of seasons: 15
- No. of episodes: 103 (list of episodes)

Production
- Executive producer: Coca-Cola Pakistan
- Producers: Rohail Hyatt; Strings; Ali Hamza & Zohaib Kazi; Xulfi
- Production location: Pakistan
- Camera setup: Multi-camera setup
- Production companies: Frequency Media; Mainstage Productions; Front Foot Media; Giraffe Pakistan

Original release
- Network: YouTube
- Release: 8 June 2008 – present

Related
- Coke Studio Explorer; Coke Studio Nu.WAV

Coke Studio Pakistan (Urdu: کوک اِسٹوڈیو پاکستان) is a Pakistani television programme and a part of the international music franchise, Coke Studio, which features studio-recorded music performances by established and emerging artists. It is the longest-running annual television music show in Pakistan, airing annually since 2008. The programme's concept originated in Brazil and has subsequently expanded its reach worldwide.

The show combines a myriad of musical influences, from traditional Pakistani classical, folk, Sufi, qawwali, ghazal and bhangra music to contemporary hip hop, rock and pop music. It is noted for promoting Pakistan's multiculturalism by inviting artists from various regions and languages to collaborate musically.

== History ==
Coke Studio originated in Brazil in 2007 as a music project, initially named Estúdio Coca-Cola, with the aim of blending the styles of two Brazilian artists. The concept was adopted by Nadeem Zaman, Marketing Head of The Coca-Cola Company, who partnered with Rohail Hyatt, a former member of the Pakistani band Vital Signs, to create a Pakistani version of the show in 2008. The inaugural season premiered with a live audience and was met with immense success. Production was handled by Hyatt, his wife Umber Hyatt, and Nofil Naqvi, a Pakistani cinematographer.

Rohail Hyatt remained the executive producer for the show until season six, stepping down in 2013 after five years. He was succeeded by Bilal Maqsood and Faisal Kapadia of the band Strings, who produced the show until the end of season ten. Strings announced that season ten would be their last. In March 2018, Ali Hamza and Zohaib Kazi were announced as the producers for season eleven, but they left after the season concluded. Rohail Hyatt made a comeback in 2019 to produce season twelve and continued at the helm for season thirteen as well. After season thirteen, Hyatt recommended Xulfi to lead production for the fourteenth season, which aired in 2022.

In August 2026, Coca-Cola announced Coke Studio Nu.WAV, a distinct platform within the wider Coke Studio Pakistan ecosystem. Executive produced by filmmaker Kamal Khan, it is not a new season of Coke Studio Pakistan nor intended to replace the main series.

== Format ==
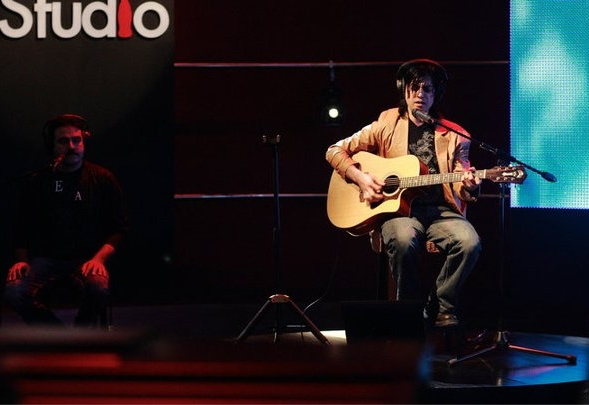
Mizraab performing live at Coke Studio, 2011

The show features artists in each episode, by a house band and guest artists. Coke Studio tracks are officially available on their YouTube channels and various streaming platforms. (Note: YouTube: Rohail Hyatt, Coke Studio; SoundCloud: Rohail Hyatt, Coke Studio) The music is recorded live by artists at Coke Studio. The televisual style emphasizes frequent close-ups on various performers, highlighting the collective contributions of the ensemble, while primarily focusing on the lead singer or singers.

== Seasons overview ==
Series	Episodes	Originally released		Producer/Curators
Series	Episodes	First released	Last released	Producer/Curators
1	4	7 June 2008	4 August 2008	Rohail Hyatt
2	5	14 June 2009	14 August 2009	Rohail Hyatt
3	5	1 June 2010	31 July 2010	Rohail Hyatt
4	5	22 May 2011	17 July 2011	Rohail Hyatt
5	5	13 May 2012	8 July 2012	Rohail Hyatt
6	5	27 October 2013	5 January 2014	Rohail Hyatt
7	7	21 September 2014	22 November 2014	Strings
8	7	16 August 2015	4 October 2015	Strings
9	7	13 August 2016	24 September 2016	Strings
10	7	11 August 2017	21 September 2017	Strings
11	9	10 August 2018	19 October 2018	Ali Hamza & Zohaib Kazi
12	6	11 October 2019	29 November 2019	Rohail Hyatt
13	4	4 December 2020	25 December 2020	Rohail Hyatt
14	4	14 January 2022	22 March 2022	Xulfi
15	4	14 April 2024	4 July 2024	Xulfi

== Reception ==
Following success in Pakistan after its first launch, Coke Studio has become an international franchise. The Pakistani show has amassed a large fan base in neighbouring country, India. The success of the show prompted Coca-Cola to launch the Indian version, Coke Studio @ MTV, with a similar format, which proved to be both critically acclaimed and commercially successful. The Indian version has been produced by MTV India. In April 2012, an Arab version of the show, Coke Studio بالعربي was launched in the Middle East featuring performances by various Arabic and international music artists, produced by the songwriter Michel Elefteriades. Following the successes of the Pakistani and Indian versions, a Bangladeshi edition, Coke Studio Bangla, was launched on 7 February 2022.

Coke Studio has also been seen as an economic process of transnationalism and as a transnational television production, with its production systems being created and augmented by global flows of artists, technology, distribution and economics. Within this process, economic structures are created, opened and even reoriented; influences are borrowed and music produced; communities and heritage discovered and remained – this is done intellectually and physically, and more importantly, transnationally.

Atif Aslam's rendition of Sabri Brothers' qawwali "Tajdar-e-Haram" in Coke Studio Season 8 became the first video originating in Pakistan to cross 100 million views on YouTube, garnering views from 186 countries. Rahat Fateh Ali Khan and Momina Mustehsan's rendition of "Afreen Afreen" from the ninth season also earned 100 million views on YouTube. Meanwhile, Ali Sethi and Shae Gill's “Pasoori” has crossed 1 billion views on YouTube, making it Coke Studio Pakistan's most listened to song on YouTube.

== See also ==
- Coke Studio Nu.WAV
- Coke Studio Bangla
- Nescafé Basement
- MTV Unplugged
- Coke Studio India
