= 15th Lux Style Awards =

Pakistani film awards ceremony

- Date: 29 July 2016
- Site: Expo Center, Karachi
- Hosted by: Ahmed Ali Butt; Ali Zafar

Television coverage
- Network: Geo Entertainment

The 15th Lux Style Awards ceremony, presented by Lux to honor the best in fashion, music, films, and Pakistani television in 2015, took place on 29 July 2016 at Expo Center, Karachi, Sindh, beginning at 7:30 p.m. PST. During the ceremony, LUX presented the Lux Style Awards (commonly referred to as LSA) in four segments including Film, Fashion, Television, and Music. The ceremony was televised in Pakistan by Geo Entertainment (on 20 August 2016 at 7 pm) and was produced by Lux Unilever Pakistan.

TV production and direction was done by Team NJ.

== Winners and nominees ==
The nominees for the 15th Lux Style Awards were announced on 30 May 2016, at 9:30 p.m. PST (21:30 UTC), at the Mövenpick Hotel Karachi in Karachi, Sindh, by actors Ahmed Ali Butt, Adnan Malik, Yasir Hussain, and Mahira Khan. For the first time in Lux Style Awards history, Supporting Roles and Singing categories were introduced in the Film section. Voting lines were set open in twelve categories on 4 July 2016 and were closed on 26 July, announcing the ceremony date.

When the nominations were announced, actor Ahmed Ali Butt was nominated in the Best Actor category, however, Butt stated in a press release that his part in the film was of a supporting role and not main, with Lux also agreeing with his decision and later moved his nomination to the Supporting Actor category. Actor Danish Taimoor, who was second in line behind Butt was replaced with his nominations.

=== Awards ===
Winners are listed first in boldface:

=== Film ===
Best Film	Best Director
**Moor**; Jawani Phir Nahi Ani; Manto; Shah; Wrong No.	**Jami – Moor**; Adnan Sarwar – Shah; Momina Duraid and Shahzad Kashmiri – Bin Roye; Nadeem Baig – Jawani Phir Nahi Ani; Sarmad Sultan Khoosat – Manto
Best Actor	Best Actress
**Humayun Saeed – Jawani Phir Nahi Ani**; Adnan Sarwar – Shah; Danish Taimoor – Wrong No.; Hameed Sheikh – Moor; Sarmad Sultan Khoosat – Manto	**Mahira Khan – Bin Roye**; Samia Mumtaz – Moor; Mehwish Hayat – Jawani Phir Nahi Ani; Sania Saeed – Manto; Sohai Ali Abro – Wrong No.
Best Supporting Actor	Best Supporting Actress
**Javed Sheikh – Wrong No.**; Ahmed Ali Butt – Jawani Phir Nahi Ani; Ali Safina – Jalaibee; Shaz Khan – Moor; Vasay Chaudhry – Jawani Phir Nahi Ani; Yasir Hussain – Karachi se Lahore	**Ayesha Khan – Jawani Phir Nahi Ani**; Armeena Rana Khan – Bin Roye; Nimra Bucha – Manto; Sarwat Gillani – Jawani Phir Nahi Ani; Sohai Ali Abro – Jawani Phir Nahi Ani
Best Playback Singer - Male	Best Playback Singer - Female
**Rahat Fateh Ali Khan – "Teray Bina Jeena" from Bin Roye**; Ali Noor and Ali Hamza – "Baysabar" from Karachi Se Lahore; Ali Sethi – "Aah Ko Chahiye" from Manto; Javed Bashir – "Talabgaar" from Moor; Rahim Shah – "Gul Bashri" from Moor	**Abida Parveen – "Maula" from Bin Roye**; Zebunnisa Bangash – "Kya Hoga" from Manto; Meesha Shafi – "Eva" from Moor; Harshdeep Kaur – "Ballay Ballay" from Bin Roye; Zarish – "Rabbi Ralli" from Karachi Se Lahore

=== Television ===
Best Television Play	Best Television Director
**Diyar-e-Dil (Hum TV)**; Mohabbat Aag Si (Hum TV); Muqaddas (Hum TV); Rang Laaga (ARY Digital); Sadqay Tumhare (Hum TV)	**Anjum Shahzad - Rang Laaga (ARY Digital)**; Aamir Yousuf - Aap ki Kaneez (Geo TV); Ehteshamuddin – Sadqay Tumhare (Hum TV); Haseeb Hassan – Diyar-e-Dil (Hum TV); Sabiha Sumar – Khuda Dekh Raha Hai (A Plus)
Best Television Actor	Best Television Actress
**Faisal Quershi – Rang Laaga (ARY Digital)**; Adnan Malik – Sadqay Tumhare (Hum TV); Noman Ejaz – Zinda Dargor (ARY Digital); Noor Hassan Rizvi – Muqaddas (Hum TV); Osman Khalid Butt – Diyar-e-Dil (Hum TV)	**Mahira Khan – Sadqay Tumhare (Hum TV)**; Iffat Rahim – Mohabbat Aag Si (Hum TV); Maya Ali – Diyar-e-Dil (Hum TV); Saima Noor – Rang Laaga (ARY Digital); Sajjal Ali – Khuda Dekh Raha Hai (A Plus)
Best Television Writer	Best Original Soundtrack
**Khalil-ur-Rehman Qamar – Sadqay Tumhare (Hum TV)**; Adeel Razzaq – Muqaddas (Hum TV); Farhat Ishtiaq – Diyar-e-Dil (Hum TV); Imran Nazir – Mohabbat Aag Si (Hum TV); Sana Fahad – Rang Laaga (ARY Digital)	**Diyar-e-Dil – Zeb Bangash and Momin Durrani (Hum TV)**; Alvida – Shafqat Amanat Ali (Hum TV); Dusri Bivi – Ahmed Jahanzeb (ARY Digital); Mohabbat Aag Si – Shafqat Salamat Ali & Beena Khan (Hum TV); Mol – Bushra Bilal (Hum TV)

=== Music ===
Best Album Of the Year	Best Song of the Year
**"Begum Gul Bakaoli Sarfarosh"-Noori**; Bahadur Yaar Jung – E Sharp; Till the End of Time – Natasha Humera Ejaz; Ismail ka Urdu Sheher – Zohaib Kazi; Saturday Night Killing Machine – Adil Omar and Talal Qureshi	**"Rockstar Romeo" – Ali Zafar**; "Jogiya" – Javed Bashir; "Sarak Sarak" – Mai Dhai Band; "Shakar Wandaan" – Asrar; "Tamasha" – Khumariyaan
Best Music Video Director	Best Emerging Talent in Music
**Salman Noorani – Mariam by Mooroo**; Adil Omar – Nighat & Paras by Adil Omar & Talal Qureshi; Kamal Khan – Wake Up/Jaago by Zohaib Kazi; Nadir Shehzad Khan – Baaghi by Sikandar Ka Mandar; Natasha Humera Ejaz & Shahrukh Khurshid – Khwab by Natasha Humera Ejaz	**Slow Spin**; Ali Suhail; Mehdi Maloof; Some What Super; The Tamashbeens

=== Fashion ===
Best Model of the Year - Male	Best Model of the Year - Female
**Hasnain Lehri**; Aimal Khan; Jahan-e-Khalid; Shahzad Noor; Waleed Khaild	**Fouzia Aman**; Amna Babar; Nooray Bhatty; Rabia Butt; Sadaf Kanwal
Best Fashion Photographer	Best Hair and Makeup Artist
Abdullah Harris; Ayaz Anis; Guddu Shani; Rizwan ul Haq; Shahbaz Shazi	Nabila; Hannan Siddique; Omayr Waqar; Raana Khan; Shammal Qureshi for Toni & Guy (North Pakistan)
Best Achievement in Fashion Design - Luxury Prèt	Best Achievement in Fashion Design - Prèt
Shamaeel Ansari; Mahgul; Misha Lakhani; Muse; Sania Maskatiya	Generation; Coco by Zara Shahjahan; Daaman; Sana Safinaz; Sapphire
Best Achievement in Fashion Design - Lawn	Best Achievement in Fashion Design - Bridal
Faraz Manan; Elan; Sana Safinaz; Sania Maskatiya; Zara Shahjahan	Faraz Manan; Ali Xeeshan; Elan; Shehla Chatoor; The House of Kamiar Rokni
Best Designer Menswear	Best Emerging Talent in Fashion
Amir Adnan; Ahmed Bham; Hassan Sheheryar Yasin; Nauman Arfeen; Omar Farooq for Republic	Alee Hasan – Photography; Ammara Khan – Designer; Anum Malik – Model; Hira Shah – Model; Zara Abid – Model

== See also ==
- 4th Hum Awards
