= 4th Hum Awards =

2016 Pakistani entertainment awards

- Official poster
- Date: 23 April 2016
- Site: Expo Centre, Karachi, Sindh
- Hosted by: Sanam Jung; Hamza Ali Abbasi; Ayesha Khan; Ahmed Ali Butt; Vasay Chaudhry
- Preshow hosts: Khalid Malik; Rubya Chaudhry
- Produced by: Nasser Saeed Janjua
- Directed by: Nasser Saeed Janjua

Highlights
- Best Drama Serial (Jury): Diyar-e-Dil
- Best Drama Serial (Popular): Diyar-e-Dil
- Most awards: Diyar-e-Dil (11)
- Most nominations: Diyar-e-Dil (15)

Television coverage
- Network: Hum
- Duration: 3 Hours 15 minutes
- Ratings: 7.6

The 4th Hum Awards ceremony, presented by the Hum Television Network and Entertainment Channel (HTNEC), sponsored by Servis, honored the best in fashion, music and Hum Television Dramas of 2015. It took place on 23 April 2016, at the Expo Centre in Karachi, Sindh, beginning at 7:30 p.m. PST. During the ceremony, HTNEC presented Hum Awards in 25 categories. The ceremony was televised in Pakistan by Hum TV on 28 May 2016.

4th Hum Awards were also selected to air on Hum Europe on Eid al-Adha 2016.

Actors Sanam Jung, Hamza Ali Abbasi, and Ayesha Khan hosted the ceremony, while Ahmed Ali Butt and Vasay Chaudhry emceed the ceremony again. The red carpet pre show was hosted by Rubya Chaudhry and Khalid Malik.

== Winners and nominees ==
Nominees for public voting were announced on 5 April 2016, on ceremony website. Only nine categories were set open for public voting in Viewers Choice Categories with five categories from Television and two categories from Fashion and Music segments, till 18 April 2016.

Winners are listed first and highlighted in boldface.

=== Television ===
Jury Choice Categories
**Best Drama Serial**: **Diyar-e-Dil – Momina Duraid**; Alvida – Momina Duraid, Humayun Saeed and Shahzad Nasib; Jugnoo – Momina Duraid; Mol – Momina Duraid; Mohabbat Aag Si – Moomal Shunaid and Kashif Nisar
**Best Director Drama Serial**: **Haseeb Hassan – Diyar-e-Dil**; Shahzad Kashmiri – Alvida; Farooq Rind – Jugnoo; Illyas Kashmiri – Mol; Syed Ahmed Kamran – Mohabbat Aag Si; Kashif Nisar – Sangat	**Best Writer Drama Serial**: **Farhat Ishtiaq – Diyar-e-Dil**; Samira Fazal – Alvida; Amna Mufti – Jugnoo; Faysal Manzoor Khan – Mol; Imran Nazeer – Mohabbat Aag Si; Zafar Mairaj – Sangat
**Best Actor**: **Meekal Zulfiqar – Diyar-e-Dil as Behroze Bakhtiyar Khan**; Osman Khalid Butt – Diyar-e-Dil as Wali Suhaib Khan; Imran Abbas Naqvi – Alvida as Hadi Salman; Adnan Siddiqui – Karb as Hamza; Faysal Qureshi – Mol as Shehreyar	**Best Actress**: **Iffat Rahim – Mohabbat Aag Si as Rukhsana**; Maya Ali – Diyar-e-Dil as Faarah Wali Khan; Yumna Zaidi – Jugnoo as Jugnoo; Naveen Waqar – Mol as Emaan; Sanam Jung – Alvida as Haya; Saba Qamar – Sangat as Aisha
**Best Supporting Actor**: **Behroze Sabzwari – Diyar-e-Dil as Tajamul Arsalan**; **Ali Rehman Khan – Diyar-e-Dil as Suhaib Bakthiyar Khan**	**Best Supporting Actor**: **Sarah Khan – Mohabbat Aag Si as Saba**; Sarah Khan – Alvida as Farisa Hadi; Saman Ansari – Jugnoo as Ayesha; Iqra Aziz – Mol as Sajjal; Ismat Zaidi – Jugnoo as Aapa Jahangir
**Best Actor in a Negative Role**: **Zahid Ahmed – Alvida as Rameez Ahmed**	**Best Actor in a Comic Role**: **Ahmed Ali Butt – Mr. Shamim as Mr. James Shamim**
**Best New Sensation - Male**: **Feroze Khan**	**Best New Sensation - Female**: **Iqra Aziz**
**Best Soap Actor Male**: **Sohail Sameer – Sartaaj Mera Tou Raaj Mera**	**Best Soap Actor Female**: **Resham – Ishq Ibadat**
**Hum Award for Best Television Film**: **Tamasha – Angelic Films**; Lucknow Waale Lateefullah –Gandhara Films; Bakron Ka Robinhood – MD Productions; Uper Gori Ka Makaan – MD Productions	**Best Onscreen Couple**: **Osman Khalid Butt and Maya Ali – Diyar-e-Dil**; Imran Abbas Naqvi and Sanam Jung – Alvida; Faysal Qureshi and Naveen Waqar – Mol
**Recognition Awards – Films**: **Mahira Khan and Humayun Saeed – Bin Roye**; **Sania Saeed and Sarmad Sultan Khoosat – Manto**; **Humayun Saeed – Jawani Phir Nahi Ani**
Viewers Choice Categories
**Best Drama Serial Popular**: **Diyar-e-Dil – Momina Duraid**; Alvida – Momina Duraid, Humayun Saeed and Shehzad Nasib; Jugnoo – Momina Duraid; Mol – Momina Duraid; Mohabbat Aag Si – Moomal Shunaid and Kashif Nisar
**Best Actor Popular**: **Osman Khalid Butt – Diyar-e-Dil as Wali Suhaib Khan**; Imran Abbas Naqvi – Alvida as Hadi Salman; Adnan Siddiqui – Karb as Hamza; Faysal Qureshi – Mol as Shehreyar; Meekal Zulfiqar – Diyar-e-Dil as Behroze Bakhtiyar Khan	**Best Actress Popular**: **Sanam Jung – Alvida as Haya**; **Maya Ali – Diyar-e-Dil as Faarah Wali Khan**; Yumna Zaidi – Jugnoo as Jugnoo; Naveen Waqar – Mol as Emaan; Iffat Rahim – Mohabbat Aag Si as Rukhsana; Saba Qamar – Sangat as Aisha
**Best Onscreen Couple Popular**: **Imran Abbas Naqvi and Sanam Jung – Alvida**; Osman Khalid Butt and Maya Ali – Diyar-e-Dil; Faysal Qureshi and Naveen Waqar – Mol	**Best Original Soundtrack**: **"Yar-e-Man" from Diyar-e-Dil – Music by Shani Arshad, Performed by Zebunnisa Bangash**; "Alvida" from Alvida – Music by Sahir Ali Bagga, Performed by Shafqat Amanat Ali; "Ishaq Bin Jiya Na Jaey" from Mohabbat Aag Si – Music By Raheel Fayyaz, Performed by Shafqat Salamat Ali and Bina Khan; "Karb" from Karb – Music by Sahir Ali Bagga, Performed by Rahat Fateh Ali Khan; "Dil Ka Kia Rung Karun" from Dil Ka Kia Rung Karun – Music by Sahir Ali Bagga, Performed by Nabeel Shaukat Ali

=== Music ===
**Best Music Single**: **"Sajna" – Uzair Jaswal**; "Aik Tha Badshah" – Noori; "Ishq Hawa Main" – Asrar; "Bewafaayian" – Quratulain Balouch; "Tere Bajon" – Jal; "Kooch" – Nabeel Shaukat Ali; "Kithay Nain" – Ali Sethi	**Best Music Video**: **Yasir Jaswal – "Sajna"**; Aisha Linnea and Shahbaz Shigri – "Bewafaayian"; Haroon Habib and Ghafar Mohiudin – "Pardesia"; Mandana Zaidi and Daniel Sanchez Lopez – "Aik Tha Badshah"; Adnan Kandhar – "Kooch"; Sarmad Sultan Khoosat – "Kithay Nain"

=== Fashion ===
Viewers Choice Categories
**Best Model Male**: **Shahzad Noor**; Jahan-e-Khalid; Hasnain Lehri; Tabish Oza; Omer Shahzad	**Best Model Female**: **Sunita Marshall**; Amna Babar; Fouzia Aman; Nooray Bhatty; Sadaf Kanwal

== See also ==
- 15th Lux Style Awards
- 2nd ARY Film Awards
