= Saira Shakira =

Pakistani fashion label

Saira Shakira is a Pakistani fashion label founded by designers Saira Faisal and Shakira Usman. The label produces bridal wear, formal wear, luxury prêt, prêt and unstitched clothing. It is based in Lahore, Pakistan.

== History ==
Saira Faisal and Shakira Usman are graduates of the Pakistan Institute of Fashion and Design. They founded the label Saira Shakira in 2011. The label initially focused on prêt and luxury prêt before expanding into formal wear and bridal couture.

The designers opened an early studio in Model Town, Lahore and later expanded the business through retail and couture operations. In 2016, the label opened a standalone store at Gulberg Galleria in Lahore.

The label has presented collections at Pakistani fashion events, including PFDC L'Oréal Paris Bridal Week, PFDC Sunsilk Fashion Week, Fashion Pakistan Week, and Pantene HUM Bridal Couture Week. Its runway collections have included bridal, formal, and prêt lines.

== Designs ==
Saira Shakira's collections include bridal wear, formal wear, luxury prêt, prêt, and unstitched collections. The official website describes the brand as combining traditional craft with contemporary silhouettes and experimental cuts.

The label has used embroidery, appliqué, threadwork, stonework, sequins, pearls, gota, and other embellishment techniques in its bridal and formal collections. Its collections have also included contemporary details such as structured silhouettes, jackets, palazzos, and non-traditional bridal colours.

== Fashion shows ==
Saira Shakira has participated in several Pakistani fashion weeks and bridal showcases. At PFDC L'Oréal Paris Bridal Week 2015, the label presented a bridal collection that included pastel tones, palazzos, jackets, and fringe details. At PFDC L'Oréal Paris Bridal Week 2016, the label presented the collection Zohra.

In 2017, the label showed Jiç at PFDC Sunsilk Fashion Week. The collection included sporty silhouettes, structured tops, racer-back details and embellished jackets. The label also appeared at Fashion Pakistan Week Winter/Festive 2017.

At PFDC L'Oréal Paris Bridal Week 2019, Saira Shakira presented Kali – A Bloom, a bridal collection using embroidery, appliqué, sequins, crystals, pearls, gota and floral motifs.

== Public reception ==
Saira Shakira received media attention in the early years of the label for its luxury prêt and formal wear. In 2015, the label was nominated for Best Emerging Talent at the Lux Style Awards.

The label's 2016 Crimson x Saira Shakira campaign received criticism on social media for its imagery. Saira Qizilbash, speaking on behalf of the label, stated that the interpretation was not what the designers had intended.
