= Nooray Bhatty =

Pakistani model

Nooray Bhatti
- Born: Noor Parvez Bhatty; 20 September 1985 (age 40); Karachi, Sindh, Pakistan
- Occupation: Fashion Model
- Years active: 2003–present
- Relatives: Sadaf Pervez (Sister)

Nooray Bhatti (born Noor Parvez Bhatty; 20 September 1985) is a Pakistani supermodel. She is regarded as one of the top models of Pakistan. Nooray has established herself as a leading model of Pakistani fashion industry and has been nominated four times for Best Model Female. She received her first Hum Award nomination at 3rd Hum Awards, as Best Model Female and consecutive nomination at 4th Hum Awards, in same category.

== Career ==
Bhatti started her career in 2003 with her first photo shoot by Khawar Riaz, who convinced her to join the industry. She has worked with Tapu Javeri as her debut into the world of modeling. In an interview with The Express Tribune, she recalled, "It just happened to me. My older sister Sadaf Pervez was a well-known model and she knew many people in the fashion industry, but back then I was busy with school and not really interested." She was casually approached by Khawar, had a photo shoot, and appeared on a magazine cover. She said, "There was no looking back from there on. Still it was never my dream to enter this industry, it just happened." She has modeled for Fahad Hussayn Rizwan Beyg, Umar Sayeed, Nilofer Shahid, Deepak Perwani, Karma, Maria B, Amir Adnan and many others. She regularly appears on PFDC Sunsilk Fashion Week and Pakistan Fashion Week.

== Awards and nominations ==
Year	Award	Category	Result	Ref.
2013	2013 Hello Awards	Best Model - Female	Won	
2009	8th Lux Style Awards	Best Model - Female	Nominated	
2011	10th Lux Style Awards	Best Model - Female	Nominated	
2014	13th Lux Style Awards	Best Model - Female	Nominated	
2015	14th Lux Style Awards	Best Model - Female	Nominated	
2015	3rd Hum Awards	Best Model Female	Nominated	
2016	4th Hum Awards	Best Model Female	Nominated	
