= Mohabbat Aag Si =

- Genre: Romance; Drama; Mystery
- Written by: Imran Nazeer
- Directed by: Syed Ahmed Kamran
- Starring: Iffat Rahim; Sarah Khan; Azfar Rehman; Tipu Shareef; Uzma Hassan; Faiza Gillani; Sajida Syed; Zainab Ahmad
- Theme music composer: Madeeha Fahad
- Opening theme: 'Ishaq Bin Jiya Na Jay' by Shafqat Salamat Ali and Bina Khan
- Country of origin: Pakistan
- Original language: Urdu
- No. of episodes: 38

Production
- Producer: Moomal Entertainment
- Running time: 30–45 minutes
- Production company: MD Productions

Original release
- Network: Hum TV
- Release: 22 July – 2 December 2015

Mohabbat Aag Si (Urdu: محبت آگ سی, lit. 'A Love Like Fire') is a 2015 Pakistani romantic drama serial directed by Ahmed Kamran and produced by Moomal Entertainment. It stars Iffat Rahim, Sarah Khan, Azfar Rehman, Tipu Sharif, Uzma Hassan, and Faiza Gillani in leading roles. The program airs Wednesday and Thursday evenings. At the 15th Lux Style Awards, it received four nominations.

== Synopsis ==
The story revolves around a woman nicknamed Aapa Jee (Iffat Rahim) and the mystery behind her real identity. In the daytime she acts very religious, and people believe she can cure illnesses; however, at night she has a different identity - she listens to music and dresses up in clothes like a dancer. Aapa Jee is very insecure when it comes to her younger brothers. Her younger brother, Sharafat (Tipu Shareef), is praying to have a child, but Aapa Jee's wish is for him not to have a child as he will be lured away by his wife's love, so she makes Samia (Uzma) drink a 'Dham wala Dhood' daily. The youngest of the three is Wajahat (Azfar Rehman), who falls in love with Samia's cousin, Saba (Sarah Khan). Aapa Jee does her best to keep the two away so they do not have a child.

Gradually, Saba begins to discover that Aapa Jee isn't who she really is as she hears music from Aapa Jee's room and notes other things. Will Saba be able to unveil the true face of Aapa Jee? What will happen later? How will everyone deal with the revelation?

== Cast ==
- Iffat Rahim as Rukhsana
- Alyy Khan as Arshad Jr.
- Sarah Khan as Saba
- Azfar Rehman as Wajahat
- Tipu Sharif as Sharafat
- Uzma Hassan as Samiya
- Faiza Gillani as Shareefa
- Seema Seher
- Zainab Ahmed as Farida
- Sajida Syed
- Syed Mazhar Ali
- Imran Ashraf as Arshad Jr.
- Awais Waseer

=== Guest ===
- Humaira Ali as Samiya's mother (Dead)
- Mubashira Khanum as Saba's mother
- Gul-e-Rana
- Fouzia Mushtaq

== Soundtrack ==
The title song is written by Wasi Shah, with composition by Raheel Fayyaz.

=== Track listing ===
| No. | Title | Artist(s) | Length |
|---|---|---|---|
| 1. | "Ishaq Bin Jiya Na Jaey" | Shafqat Salamat Ali and Bina Khan | 3:52 |

== Awards ==
| Year | Award | Reception(s) | Result | Ref |
|---|---|---|---|---|
| Hum Awards | Best Actor Female Jury | Iffat Rahim | Won | |
| Hum Awards | Best Actor In a Supporting Role Female | Sarah Khan | Won | |
| Hum Awards | Best Drama Serial Popular | Moomal Shunaid & Kashif Nisar | Nominated | |
| Hum Awards | Best Actress Popular | Iffat Rahim | Nominated | |
| Hum Awards | Best OST | Music by Raheel Fayyaz; Performed by Shafqat Salamat Ali & Bina Khan | Nominated | |
| Lux Style awards | Best Television Play | Mohabbat Aag Si | Nominated | |
| Lux Style awards | Best Television Actress | Iffat Rahim | Nominated | |
| Lux Style awards | Best Television Writer | Imran Nazir | Nominated | |
| Lux Style awards | Best Original Soundtrack | Shafqat Amanat Ali & Beena Khan | Nominated | |
