= Kaala Doriya =

Pakistani television series

- Urdu: کالا ڈوریا
- Genre: Comedy; Family; Romance
- Written by: Saima Akram Chaudhry
- Directed by: Danish Nawaz
- Starring: Sana Javed; Osman Khalid Butt; (For entire cast see below)
- Theme music composer: Naveed Nashad
- Opening theme: "Kala Doriya" by Abrar-ul-Haq and Neha Chaudhry
- Ending theme: "Kala Doriya" by Abrar-ul-Haq and Neha Chaudhry
- Composer: Naveed Nashad
- Country of origin: Pakistan
- Original languages: Urdu; Punjabi
- No. of seasons: 1
- No. of episodes: 27

Production
- Executive producer: Momina Duraid
- Producer: Momina Duraid
- Production locations: Karachi, Pakistan
- Camera setup: Multi-camera setup
- Running time: 35 minutes
- Production company: MD Productions

Original release
- Network: Hum TV
- Release: 16 September 2022 – 24 March 2023

Related
- Chupke Chupke

Kala Doriya (Urdu: کالا ڈوریا) is a Pakistani romance comedy-drama television series that was first broadcast on Hum TV and PTV Home on 16 September 2022. Momina Duraid produced the show under the banner, MD Productions. It was written by Saima Akram Chaudhry and directed by Danish Nawaz. The series stars an ensemble cast of Sana Javed, Osman Khalid Butt, Nadia Afgan, Zainab Qayyum, Adla Khan, Shahzad Noor, Samina Ahmed, and Khalid Anam.

First announced in early 2021, the show got delayed due to the writer's other projects, mainly the Ramadan series.

== Plot ==
Kaala Doriya revolves around the lives of Mahnoor and Asfand. There is no love between their families, and they are constantly fighting. They are students at the same college and have a habit of teasing each other. Asfand and Mahnoor's fight turned out to be an interesting bond that they developed between them. In the end, they eventually fall in love with each other. However, this news is shocking for their families since they cannot even comprehend the magnitude of this news. The love story angle is sure to capture everyone's attention.

== Cast ==
- Osman Khalid Butt as Asfandyar Munir aka Asfi
- Sana Javed as Mahnoor Shuja aka Mano
- Nadia Afgan as Mrs. Tehniyat Shuja Ahmed aka Tanno
- Shahzad Noor as Faraz, Asfand's brother
- Samina Ahmed as Tabassum Jahan (Grandmother)
- Adla Khan as Nida Shuja Faraz (Faraz Wife)
- Khalid Anam as Mr Ikhtiar Ahmed (Grandfather)
- Zainab Qayyum as Mrs Saleeqa Munir Ahmed
- Farhan Ally Agha as Munir (Asfand & Faraz father)
- Saife Hassan as Professor Hammad (Asfand & Mahnoor University Professor)
- Sohail Sameer as Shuja (Mahnoor & Nida father)
- Taimoor Akbar as Gohar (Mahnoor Shuja and Asfandyar Munir College Fellows
- Khalid Malik as Kabir (Kuku Mamu) Tanno Brother & Mahnoor and Nida Uncle. Batool Husband
- Tamkenat Mansoor as Batool (Bitto Apa)- Kabir Wife
- Shareef Baloch as SHO

== Production ==
=== Development ===
After the success of her 2021 Ramadan television series Chupke Chupke, screenwriter Saima Akram Chaudhry revealed that her next series is titled Kala Doriya, which will not broadcast in Ramadan. In September 2021, it was confirmed that Sana Javed and Farhan Saeed has been selected to portray the leading roles, and Amin Iqbal, the director of Ishq-e-Laa, will direct the series. The pre-production work on the series began in late 2020 but released in 2022 due to Chaudhry's other projects with the production house, including Chupke Chupke and Hum Tum.

=== Casting ===
In March 2022, it was reported that Usman Mukhtar had joined the cast by replacing Saeed. In June 2022, the project underwent major changes, with Ali Rehman Khan replaced Saeed and director Amin Iqbal replaced by Danish Nawaz. In the same month, Nadia Afgan also joined the cast. In late July, it was reported that the male lead had changed again, and Osman Khalid Butt has replaced Khan, who will make his second collaboration with Javed after Goya. In the same month, Afgan revealed that the character she is playing is almost similar to Shahana, the character she played in Suno Chanda and its sequel.

=== Release ===
The first and second teasers were released on 7 September 2022.

== Reception ==
The show launched on 16 September. The first episode received mixed reviews from the audience, some comparing it with previous Ramadan plays on HUM TV. The drama started with lower TRPs but later achieved high ratings, up to 7 of the 9th episode.
