= Noor Zehra =

- Born: Noor Zehra Kazim
- Genres: Hindustani classical music, North Indian classical music
- Occupations: Sagar Veena maestro, composer
- Instrument: Sagar Veena
- Years active: 1970–present
- Member of: Noori, Strings, Coke Studio

Noor Zehra Kazim is a Pakistani musician and Sagar Veena player. She is the daughter of lawyer and activist Raza Kazim who invented Sagar Veena - a stringed instrument similar to vichitra veena and Chitra Veena. Until her father was alive, she ran together with him the Sanjan Nagar Institute of Philosophy and Arts, and is the only performer of Sagar Veena since its creation in 1971. With a career spanned over four decades, she has performed both domestically and internationally, achieving critical appraisal for instrument, as well as her Indian style of music being a non-Indian.

She made her Coke Studio debut in season 3 and returned in season 9, as a part of team Noori. She is the mother of Noori's lead vocalist Ali Noor and guitarist Ali Hamza.

== Early life ==
Noor Zehra Kazim was born in Lahore, Punjab to a prominent lawyer, politician, philosopher and activist Raza Kazim. She is married to Ali Kazim who is a singer. She is the mother of Ali Noor and Ali Hamza of band Noori. Zehra Kazim together with her father, runs Sanjan Nagar Institute of Philosophy and Arts, where the instrument Sagar Veena was developed, it is inspired by the Indian strings instruments, Vichitra veena and Gottuvadhyam. Noor Zehra, taught herself while the instrument being developed at APA.

== Musical trainings and career ==
Zehra started her formal training during 1971, when she learns Rajeshwari Datta, head of the Indian Department at School of Oriental and African Studies (SOAS) teaches similar instrument in London, England. Kazim then went to Berkeley, California in US, and studies at the Ali Akbar College of Music. In Pakistan she learn under Ustad Shareef Khan Poonchwala for a few years and established herself as the only Veena player of Pakistan.

Noor Zehra has played the Sagar Veena for a number of audiences, and has even travelled to Japan and Norway for performances. Currently, she is still undergoing her musical journey, in which she eventually seeks to discover and create "Sanjan Sangeet". She regularly performs at Sanjan Nagar Sangeet Sammelan, and performed at various music conferences, festivals and classical occasions. She appeared in season 3 of music reality television series Coke Studio where she performed as a Veena Player with her son, along with musician Rohail Hyatt. In 2016, she returned to Coke Studio's season 9, under team supervisions of Noori and Strings (band) as a Sagar Veena player for the Song "Paar Channa De".
