= Tabish =

Tabish or Tabesh (Urdu: تابش; Persian: تابش) is a masculine given name and surname of Persian origin. Notable people with the name include:

== Given name ==
=== Tabish ===
- Tabish Dehlvi (1913–2004), Pakistani poet
- Tabish Hussain (born 2001), British-Pakistani footballer
- Tabish Khair (born 1966), Indian author and professor
- Tabish Khan (born 1984), Pakistani cricketer
- Tabish Mehdi (1951–2025), Indian poet, literary critic, journalist, and author
- Tabish Oza (born 1989), Pakistani fashion model

== Surname ==
=== Tabesh ===
- Mohammad Reza Tabesh (born 1956), Iranian politician

=== Tabish ===
- Elizabeth Tabish (born 1986), American actress
- S. Amin Tabish (born 1957), Indian medical scientist, physician, healthcare administrator, author, and poet
