= Uzma =

Uzma (عظمیٰ) is a female name of Arabic origin meaning "lofty" or "supreme". The name is commonly used in mostly Pakistan, Iran and among Muslims of India. Notable people with the name include:

== Given name ==
- Uzma Alkarim, Pakistani television news anchor, programme host and producer
- Uzma Butt, Pakistani politician
- Uzma Gillani (born 1945), Pakistani actress and advertiser
- Uzma Gondal (born 1978), Pakistani cricketer
- Uzma Hassan (born 1980), Pakistani actress
- Uzma Iftikhar (born 1987), Pakistani-American cricketer
- Uzma Jabeen, Pakistani politician
- Uzma Riaz Jadoon, Pakistani politician
- Uzma Jalaluddin (born 1980), Canadian writer
- Uzma Kardar (born 1956), Pakistani politician
- Uzma Khan (born 1987), Pakistani actress and model
- Uzma Khan (politician), Pakistani politician
- Uzma Aslam Khan (born 1969), Pakistani writer
- Uzma Qadri (born 1970), Pakistani politician
- Uzma Z. Rizvi, American archaeologist
- Uzma Yousaf, Pakistani mountaineer
