= Hasnain Lehri =

Pakistani fashion model

- Born: Hasnain Lehri; Quetta, Balochistan, Pakistan
- Education: University of Balochistan
- Occupation: Model
- Years active: 2014 - present

Hasnain Lehri is a Pakistani actor and fashion model. He has won multiple awards as an actor and model, and is the only super model to have won five LUX Style Awards in the history of Pakistani fashion and entertainment industry.

== Early and personal life ==
Lehri was born in Quetta, Balochistan into a Baloch family, his father being a sardar or tribal chief of the Lehri tribe.

In December 2023, Lehri proposed to Lebanese model and TV presenter Loujain Adada. Loujain was married to the now deceased Saudi millionaire Walid Juffali

== Career ==
Lehri set a record of receiving four consecutive awards at the Lux Style Awards, (winning year) LSA 2015, 2016, 2017 and 2018, and again at LSA 2020.

== Media image ==
He was chosen as one of the Top 100 Sexiest Asian Men in a poll conducted by Eastern Eye in 2017.

== Awards and nominations ==
Year	Award	Category	Result	Ref.
2015	14th Lux Style Awards	Best Model Emerging Talent - Fashion	Nominated	
2015	3rd Hum Awards	Best Model - Male	Won	
2016	15th Lux Style Awards	Best Model of the Year - Male	Won	
2017	16th Lux Style Awards	Best Model of the Year - Male	Won	
2018	17th Lux Style Awards	Best Model of the Year - Male	Won	
2019	18th Lux Style Awards	Best Model of the Year - Male	Nominated	
2021	Hum Style Awards	Best Model - Male	Won	
