= Say It All with Iffat Omer =

Pakistani web television talk show

- Created by: Najam Sethi; Iffat Rahim
- Presented by: Iffat Rahim
- Country of origin: Pakistan
- Original language: Urdu
- No. of episodes: 11

Production
- Producer: Meeran Karim
- Production locations: Karachi, Sindh, Pakistan
- Running time: 30 - 65 minutes
- Production company: Dot Republic Media

Original release
- Network: YouTube
- Release: 12 August 2019 – present

Say It All with Iffat Omer is a Pakistani web television talk show hosted by Iffat Rahim that first aired on 12 August 2019 on YouTube. The series is created by Najam Sethi and produced by Meeran Karim. Each episode is separately sponsored and features a Pakistani celebrity interviewed about their daily lifestyles and success stories.

== Production ==
On being asked what she felt would be new on her series, Iffat Rahim said she hoped to provide a safe platform for all celebrities and make it as interesting as possible for her audience.

== Episodes ==
| Episode No. | Guest(s) | Date of Broadcast |
|---|---|---|
| 1 | Noman Ejaz | 12 August 2019 |
| 2 | Maya Ali & Shehryar Munawar | 23 August 2019 |
| 3 | Hareem Farooq & Ali Rehman Khan | 30 August 2019 |
| 4 | Meera & Saqib Malik | 6 September 2019 |
| 5 | Zara Noor Abbas | 13 September 2019 |
| 6 | Juggan Kazim | 27 September 2019 |
| 7 | Ali Azmat | 4 October 2019 |
| 8 | Uzma Hassan | 11 October 2019 |
| 9 | Eman Suleman | 1 November 2019 |
| 10 | Najam Sethi | 6 December 2019 |
| 11 | Sonya Hussain | 13 December 2019 |
| 12 | Vasay Chaudhary | 27 December 2019 |
