= Roiyaan =

2014 single by Farhan Saeed

- Farhan Saeed and Sabeeka Imam in the music video of the song.

Single by Farhan Saeed
- Released: June 6, 2014"
- Recorded: 2014
- Genre: Pop; Pakistani
- Length: 5:06
- Label: Lb Tunes; Jaswal Films
- Songwriter: Kumaar
- Producer: Farhan

Farhan Saeed singles chronology
"Bhool Na Jaana" (2014)	"Roiyaan" (2014)

Music video
- "Roiyaan" on YouTube

"Roiyaan" (Punjabi: روئ آں; Urdu: روئیاں; transl. I Cried) is a 2014 single by Pakistani recording artist Farhan Saeed. It was released on June 6, 2014 in Pakistan as a digital download. "Roiyaan" is a love-inspired ballad that details the protagonist is mourning over her deceased lover. The song was written by Indian lyricist Kumaar, and composed by Saeed and Indian Punjabi musician Jaidev Kumar. The music video of the song is picturised upon Saeed and Sabeeka Imam.

Roiyaan was well received by critics, becoming one of the most successful singles by the singer. At the 3rd Annual Hum Awards ceremony, it was nominated for Best Music Single for Farhan and Best Music Video for Yasir M. Jaswal.

== Background ==
From Farhan accounts, song lyrics were initially penned down by him as "saiyaan saiyaan teri aan teri aan" but when he met Indian lyricist Kumaar, he co-writes the song with singer and change the title line to "Roiyaan Roiyaan akhiyaan roiyaan". Song is also a composition of Farhan with the collaboration of Indian Punjabi musician Jaidev Kumar. After completion many offers were made by Indian music producers to use the song in their upcoming films, but Farhan first decided to release the song in Pakistan. Farhan also serves as a producer to songs' music video. He approaches singer-composer and director Yasir Muhammad Jaswal to direct the music video of song and Sabeeka for the role, talking in an interview Farhan said, "I started looking for a good director who could do justice to its video and the only one I could think of was Yasir (Jaswal) as he heard the song and was in love with it; I had full faith in him. Sabeeka (Imam) was the female model who has been doing great in the fashion industry and was perfect for the role."

== Music video ==
=== Synopsis ===
Video deals with the elements of love, separation and nostalgia featuring Saeed and model Sabeeka Imam. In the video female protagonist is mourning over the death of her lover, as she visits his grave and other places where they were once, she cries and remember him. While in the video her lover is constantly with her as apparition, watching over her and longing to hold her once again, she finally sees him and touch him, but he has to leave as he is dead.

=== Cast and crew ===
Farhan Saeed

- Singer: Farhan Saeed
- Featuring Artist: Farhan Saeed and Sabeeka Imam
- Composed by: Farhan Saeed and Jaidev Kumar
- Lyrics: Kumaar
- Director: Yasir Jaswal
- Assistant Director: Ammar Arshad
- Producer: Farhan Saeed
- Presenter: Lb Tunes
- Label: Jaswal Films

== Track listing ==
- Digital download (2014)

"Roiyaan" featuring Sabeeka Imam — 5:06

== Accolades ==
The single receives following nominations at 2015 Hum Awards:

Year	Award	Category	Recipient(s)	Result
2015	3rd Hum Awards	Best Solo Single	Farhan Saeed	Won
2015	3rd Hum Awards	Best Music Video	Yasir M. Jaswal	Nominated
2015	14th Lux Style Awards	Song of the Year	Farhan Saeed	Won

== See also ==
- "Shikva" by Faakhir
