= Maikay Ki Yaad Na Aaye =

- Title screen
- Genre: Soap opera Family drama Romantic drama
- Created by: Babar Javed
- Written by: Sadia Aziz Afridi
- Directed by: Naushad Anwer Khan
- Country of origin: Pakistan
- Original language: Urdu
- No. of episodes: 102

Production
- Producer: Babar Javed
- Camera setup: Multi-camera setup

Original release
- Network: Geo Tv
- Release: 6 July – 29 November 2016

Maikay Ki Yaad Na Aaye is a Pakistani drama soap that first aired on Geo Tv on 6 July 2016 (first day of Eid). It is produced by Babar Javed. It aired every Monday to Friday at 7:00 pm only on Geo Tv, but after 28 episodes, the soap was shifted to the 10:30pm slot as Mera Dard Bayzuban took its place.

== Cast ==
- Munawar Saeed
- Yasir Ali Khan
- Fariya Hassan
- Nida Mumtaz
- Anoushay Abbasi
- Kanwar Nafees
- Arez Ahmed
- Farah Nadir
- Darzana Shafiq
- Majida Hameed
- Farzana Shafiq
- Tauqeer Ahmed Paul
- Jahanara Hai
- Kehkashan Faisal
- Hafsa Butt

== See also ==
- Geo TV
- List of programs broadcast by Geo Entertainment
- List of Pakistani television series
