= Chup Raho =

Pakistani television series (2014–2015)

- چپ رہو
- Genre: Romance; Thrill
- Written by: Samira Fazal
- Directed by: Yasir Nawaz
- Starring: Sajal Ali; Yasir Nawaz; Syed Jibran; Arjumand Rahim; Feroze Khan; (For entire cast see the section of cast below)
- Opening theme: Dheere Dheere Fanaah
- Ending theme: Tu Bhi Bas Chup Rahti Hai Meri hi Tarhan by Alycia Dias
- Country of origin: Pakistan
- Original language: Urdu
- No. of seasons: 1
- No. of episodes: 28

Production
- Producer: Six Sigma Entertainment
- Camera setup: Multi-camera
- Running time: Approx. 40-45 minutes

Original release
- Network: ARY Digital
- Release: 19 August 2014 – 10 March 2015

Chup Raho (transl. Be Quiet!) is a Pakistani drama series that originally started airing on ARY Digital from 19 August 2014. The series was directed by Yasir Nawaz, written by Samira Fazal, and produced by Six Sigma Entertainment. It stars Sajal Ali, Syed Jibran, Yasir Nawaz, Arjumand Rahim, and Feroze Khan.

== Plot ==
The story revolves around Rameen, who comes from Islamabad to Karachi along with her parents to meet her sister Minal and brother-in-law Numair, who has lustful eyes upon her.

He rapes her and forcefully makes her remain silent. Azar, a cousin of Numair, is keen to marry Rameen. After being raped by Numair, she is reluctant to marry Azar, as she thinks he might be the same as Numair.

Rameen discloses to her parents that Numair harasses her, to which her mother asks her to keep it a secret as it could affect her sister's marital life. Numair attacks his father-in-law as he discovers the truth. Rameen's father suffers from a heart attack and passes away.

Rameen then agrees to marry Azar, after which she tries to tell her husband the truth about Numair. He thinks she is lying, as Rameen's mother lies to everyone that Rameen is suffering from a disease and needs medical attention as she wants to save her daughter Minal's marriage.

Later, her mother dies. Azar, Minal, and Numair throw her out of the house, and she lives in the servant quarters. No one believes her to be innocent. Rameen then leaves the house quietly.

She lives in a private women's hostel, where she meets a girl who sells girls for money. Rameen doesn't know about it, but when she learns it, she escapes as that girl is on her way to sell her.

There, she meets Sheraz. Sheraz is a widower with three daughters. Azar commits suicide as he is guilty of what he did to Rameen. Sheraz takes Rameen to his house. There, she gets attached to Sheraz's daughters and mother and requests that he let her live there as a maid. He gives her permission to live in his house. Soon, both of them fall in love with each other.

Numair and Minal's daughter is diagnosed with cancer. Numair thinks that if Rameen lives close to his daughter, Allah will forgive his sins and cure her. When Rameen returns home, Numair accepts that he raped Rameen, and to stop her from going away again, he doesn't tell her that Azar is dead. He says that Azar is in Saudi Arabia and sends her flowers and messages in the name of Azar to make sure she thinks he is alive. Minal is confused and agitated, so she confronts Rameen to tell her that Azar is dead and that Numair is lying to her. Numair claims Sheraz has lustful eyes towards Rameen, which Rameen accepts. But when Rameen learns the truth, she leaves the house and marries Sheraz. Numair is devastated and thinks that now his daughter will die, and eventually, he goes mad and is sent to a mental hospital. Minal is in the hospital crying over her daughter's condition, while she remembers all those times when she wronged her sister just for her husband. Sheraz and Rameen live with their children happily.

== Cast ==
- Sajal Ali as Rameen
- Yasir Nawaz as Sheraz
- Syed Jibran as Numair
- Arjumand Rahim as Minal
- Feroze Khan as Azar
- Shaheen Khan as Rameen and Minal's mother
- Tariq Jameel as Rameen and Minal's father
- Rizwana as Sheraz's mother
- Silah (childstar)
- Eshal (childstar)
- Arisha (childstar)

== Release ==
In 2015, the show was broadcast in India on Zindagi under the title Khamosh Ladki ... Dheere Dheere Fanah In 2017, it also aired on ARY Digital's sister channel, ARY Zindagi. Furthermore, it is also available on the Indian OTT platform MX Player to stream online.

== Reception ==
The drama serial soon became popular after its release. It made the ARY Digital slot leader on Tuesdays. The drama serial gained high ratings, was a commercial success, and received average TRPs of 6.5 and 8.9 at its highest.

On its premiere, the series was praised by the critics due to its unique storyline and portrayal of a taboo subject, but later it was criticised due to its unauthentic, flawed dramatisation and misleading depiction.

== Accolades ==
Nominations

- Lux Style Awards - Bes TV Play
- Lux Style Awards - Best TV Writer - Samira Fazal
- Lux Style Awards - Best TV Actor - Syed Jibran
