= Muqaddas (TV series) =

2015 Pakistani drama serial

- Genre: Thriller
- Written by: Adeel Razzak
- Directed by: Ali Masud Saeed
- Opening theme: "Dil Machis He"
- Country of origin: Pakistan
- Original language: Urdu
- No. of episodes: 36

Production
- Producer: Momina Duraid
- Editor: Saad Bin Jawed
- Running time: 30–45 minutes

Original release
- Network: Hum TV
- Release: 25 May – 7 September 2015

Related
- Aik Thi Misaal

Muqaddas (Urdu: مقدس, lit. 'Sacred/Blessed') is a 2015 Pakistani romantic, thriller television series that premiered on Hum TV on 25 May 2015. The serial is produced by Momina Duraid under MD Productions. It stars Noor Hassan Rizvi, Iqra Aziz, ZQ, Hina Khawaja Bayat and Farhan Ali Agha. At 15th Lux Style Awards, it received three nominations, for Best TV Play, Best TV Actor (for Noor Hassan) and Best TV Writer (for Adeel Razzaq).

== Cast ==
- Noor Hassan Rizvi as Aatir
- Iqra Aziz as Muqaddas
- Zainab Qayyum as Tehreem
- Hina Bayat as Ruhi
- Farhan Ali Agha as Akbar
- Khalid Anam as Jahanzeb
- Fazila Qazi as Mariyum
- Muhammad Asad as Mohib
- Nida Khan as Nida
- Agha Jarar as Zain
- Furqan Qureshi as Kabeer
- Fariya Hassan as Annie

== Awards ==
Year	Award	Category	Recipient(s) and nominee(s)	Result
2016	Lux Style Awards	Best Television Play	Muqaddas	Nominated
2016	Lux Style Awards	Best Television Actor	Noor Hassan Rizvi	Nominated
2016	Lux Style Awards	Best Television Writer	Adeel Razzaq	Nominated

Note: To this day, it remains the only Hum TV series to be nominated at Lux Style Awards without getting a single nomination at Hum Awards.
