= Tabish Oza =

Pakistani fashion model (born 1989)

- Born: August 14, 1989 (age 36); Sindh, Karachi, Pakistan
- Occupation: Model
- Years active: 2011–16

Tabish Oza is a Pakistani fashion model. He started his career in 2011. He has established himself as one of the leading models working with well-known brands and designers. He received his first nomination at lux style awards 2014 as best emerging talent in fashion and at 3rd Hum Awards as Best Model Male.

== Career ==
Tabish was born on August 14, 1990, in Lahore to Muslim parents and holds a double MBA in Finance and Marketing. He started his career in 2011 after winning a fashion week hunt, recalling: "I entered the field of fashion during the end of 2011 by winning the Bridal Couture Week model hunt among 300 guys. It was a dream start for me because that didn't only give me a chance to go for Bridal Couture Week Lahore but also showered tons of shoots." He has since worked with many fashion designers and brands specially, Bonanza, Shoe Planet, Gul Ahmed Group etc. He regularly appears in PFDC Sunsilk Fashion Week and Pakistan Fashion Weeks every year.

== Awards and nominations ==
| Year | Award | Category | Result | Ref. |
|---|---|---|---|---|
| 2016 | 4th Hum Awards | Best Model Male | Pending | |
