= Tamkenat Mansoor =

Pakistani medical doctor, physician, content creator, influencer, activist and actress

- Born: Tamkenat Mansoor; September 20, 1985 (age 40)
- Occupations: Doctor; Physician; Content creator; Influencer; Activist; Actress
- Years active: 2017–present
- Children: 2

Tamkenat Mansoor is a Pakistani medical doctor, physician, content creator, influencer, activist and actress. She is trained as a medical doctor and currently works in aesthetic medicine. As an actress, she has appeared in Kala Doriya and Stand-up Girl.

== Early life and career ==
She began producing online video content in 2017 on platforms including YouTube and Facebook. She frequently addresses public health topics in her social media content, using local languages and frequently comments on controversial or political sensitive issues. Tamkenat is known for character-driven comedic sketches depicting everyday social dynamics in Pakistani society; these portrayals often critique patriarchal norms, particularly using female archetypes like intrusive grandmothers or outspoken attendants.

=== Acting career ===
She started her acting via collaborations in web-based projects: first approached by Faseeh Khan, then cast in Hum TV's Kala Doriya and Stand-up Girl by Kashif Nisar.

== Personal life ==
Tamkenat is a single mother of two daughters.

== Filmography ==
=== Television ===
Year	Title	Role	Network	Ref(s)
2022	Kala Doriya	Batool (Bitto Apa)- Kabir's Wife	Hum TV	
2023	Stand-up Girl	Hina	Green Entertainment	
2025	Jinn Ki Shadi Unki Shadi	Chamki	Hum TV	

=== Film ===
Year	Title	Role	Notes
2022	Gulzar	Sunheri	Short film
