= Bitiya Hamaray Zamanay Mein =

- Created by: 7th Sky Entertainment
- Written by: Mansoor Saeed
- Directed by: Ali Azfar
- Starring: Ushna Shah; Wahaj Ali; Javeria Abbasi; Rubina Ashraf; Farhan Ally Agha; Fariya Hassan
- Country of origin: Pakistan
- Original language: Urdu

Production
- Producers: Abdullah Kadwani; Asad Qureshi

Original release
- Release: August 2016

Bitiya Hamaray Zamanay Main (English: Daughter, in our times) is a 2016 Pakistani comedy drama telefilm directed by Azfar Ali, written by Mansoor Saeed, and produced by Abdullah Kadwani and Asad Qureshi under the 7th Sky Entertainment banner. The serial stars Ushna Shah, Javeria Abbasi and Wahaj Ali and was released in August 2016.

== Synopsis ==
Bitiya Humare Zamane Ki is a romantic comedy film which tells the story of three mothers who all have different aims for their children. One of them wants to get her son married while the other has recently got his son married. The third is a stepmother of Iraj (Ushna Shah) and since the start they both have had their differences and disagreements. Iraj falls in love with Fahad (Wahaj Ali) who is the only son of his parents. Fahad's mother is overly possessive about his son and wants to find him the best bride. During engagement and wedding preparations, many misunderstanding and disagreements happen. Amidst family pressures Fahad and Iraj come closer and part ways.

== Cast ==
- Ushna Shah as Iraj
- Wahaj Ali as Fahad
- Javeria Abbasi
- Rubina Ashraf
- Fariya Hassan as Ushna
- Farhan Ali Agha
