= Rang Laaga =

Pakistani television drama

- Written by: Sana Fahad
- Directed by: Anjum Shahzad
- Starring: Saima Noor; Faisal Qureshi; Neelam Muneer; Aliya Ali; Saboor Ali; Afshan Qureshi
- Country of origin: Pakistan
- Original language: Urdu
- No. of episodes: 34

Production
- Producers: Fahad Mustafa & Ali Kazmi; Big Bang Entertainment
- Running time: 30–45 minutes

Original release
- Network: ARY Digital
- Release: 11 March – 4 November 2015

Rang Laaga (Urdu: رنگ لاگا) is a 2015 Pakistani drama serial that originally aired on ARY Digital from 11 March 2015 to 4 November 2015, airing a total 34 episodes. It was directed by Anjum Shahzad and written by Sana Fahad. The drama stars Saima Noor, Faisal Qureshi, Neelam Muneer and Saboor Ali in pivot roles. At the annual 15th Lux Style Awards, Rang Laaga received five nominations, including Best TV Play for Fahad Mustafa and Ali Kazmi, Best TV Actor for Qureshi, Best TV Actress for Noor, Best Director for Shehzad, and Best Writer for Fahad.

== Plot ==
Aashiq (Faysal Quraishi) reveals his three years old second Rizwana (Neelam Muneer), who Shehnaz had insulted three years and forced to leave the town upon the discovering their relationship, and his few months old daughter to his 15 year old married first wife Shehnaz (Saima Noor) with whom he has six children; two elder daughters Shumaila (Saboor Ali) and Shumaila (Moomal Khalid) and four younger sons. He brings Rizwana to his own house. After some time, Rizwana's friend Laila (Zhalay Sarhadi) visits them for the first time after Rizwana's marriage and lives at her place. Aashiq falls in love with her, and Laila also flirts with him. He married her as well, making Laila his third wife. After few months, Ashiq sees a woman passing by his shop, when he is standing with his friend. He tells his friend to find out about her. He tells Ashiq that she is Shehr Bano, the widow of a martyred soldier. He sends proposal to her. Her uncle and aunt, with whom she lives, convince her her to marry her. Time passes. When her daughter Shumaila tried to set fire on the stove to cook, she couldn't feel the smell of the gas but the Ashiq, sitting in living room, does. He goes to the kitchen, and sees Shumaila trying to set the fire. He suddenly pulled her, and himself got attacked by the fire, resultantly causing his face to get burnt. His third wife Laila had left and ran away with his neighbour her last day, leaving a chit for him which her daughter brings in today from her room. Rizwana also leaves her saying that he doesn't have any good looks now due to burnt face. His only first wife Shehnaz and fourth wife Shehr Bano says with him, being loyal wives. He realises his mistake of infidelity with Shehnaz and apologizes to her. She forgives him, and the drama ends.

== Cast ==
- Saima Noor as Shehnaz
- Faisal Qureshi as Aashiq Hussain
- Neelam Muneer as Rizwana
- Zhalay Sarhadi as Laila
- Saboor Ali as Shumaila
- Moomal Khalid as Samina
- Afshan Qureshi as Shabana
- Aliya Ali as Shehar Bano
- Salahuddin Tunio as Inspector Shaukat
- Raeed Muhammad Alam as Haider
- Gul-e-Rana as Laila's mother
- Beena Chaudhary as Shehar Bano's aunt
- Nida Mumtaz as Rizwana's mother
- Aamir Qureshi

== Awards ==
The drama received five nominations at 15th Lux Style Awards.

Date of ceremony	Awards	Recipient(s) and nominee(s)	Result
July 29, 2016	Lux Style Awards	Big Bang Entertainment for Best Television Play	Nominated
July 29, 2016	Lux Style Awards	Anjum Shahzad for Best Television Director	Won
July 29, 2016	Lux Style Awards	Faisal Qureshi for Best Television Actor	Won
July 29, 2016	Lux Style Awards	Saima Noor for Best Television Actress	Nominated
July 29, 2016	Lux Style Awards	Sana Fahad for Best Television Writer	Nominated
