= Raza Kazim =

Pakistani politician (1930–2026)

- Born: 13 January 1930; British India
- Died: 16 April 2026 (aged 96); Lahore, Punjab, Pakistan
- Relatives: Nasim Zehra (sister); Noor Zehra (daughter); Juggan Kazim (niece)

Raza Kazim (Urdu: رضا کاظِم; 13 January 1930 – 16 April 2026) was a Pakistani lawyer, philosopher, inventor and politician.

== Background ==
Kazim was born on 13 January 1930. He invented a musical instrument, the Sagar Veena, of which his daughter Noor Zehra is the only player in Pakistan, and through her is the grandfather of the famous pop-rock band Noori duo, Ali Noor and Ali Hamza, while another daughter, Baela Raza Jamil, is one of Pakistan's leading educators, with major contributions in the field of education reform. He is also the uncle of actress and model Juggan Kazim. He is the brother of political analyst Nasim Zehra.

== Politics ==
Kazim began his political career with a protest in his school during the Quit India Movement, in 1942 in the United Provinces (now Uttar Pradesh, India), and joined the Communist Party of Pakistan in 1948 for some time before quitting it for ideological reasons in 1951, while he became a lawyer in 1953, and as an activist was jailed under Ayyub Khan, Zulfiqar Ali Bhutto as well as Zia-ul-Haq, the first two for refusing to become a minister, and the third for supposedly attempting a coup d'état. He later on abandoned leftist politics and Marxism altogether, after having studied it for some two decades but ultimately writing a "50-page article on gaps in facts and reasoning in dialectical and historical materialism", and later described himself as a "post-Marxist."

== Later life and death ==
Kazim later devoted his time to the Sanjan Nagar Institute of Philosophy & Arts, a non-profit organization consisting of a team of fifty (now growing) full-time members working in the fields of Philosophy, Music and Photography. The Institute is currently based in Lahore.

Kazim died in Lahore on 16 April 2026, at the age of 96.

== Books and booklets ==
- Notes on theoretical aspects of revolution, 1972.
- Socialist revolution : the alternative to disaster, 1974.
- Dictatorship of the urban left : Pakistan's road to socialism, 1974.
- Pākistānī inqilāb aur Islām, 1976.
- Raz̤ā Kāẓim : mushāhidāt, 1986.
