= Uff Meri Family =

Pakistani sitcom

- Official title screen
- Genre: Sitcom
- Written by: Hassan Ali
- Directed by: Azfar Ali
- Starring: Naveen Waqar; Azfar Ali; Saif-e-Hassan; Amber khan Bilal
- Theme music composer: Farhan Rafi
- Composer: Farhan Rafi
- Country of origin: Pakistan
- Original language: Urdu
- No. of episodes: 26

Production
- Producer: Momina Duraid
- Production location: Karachi
- Cinematography: Sajid Daad
- Editors: Farhan Rafi; Asim Siddiqui
- Camera setup: Multi-camera setup
- Running time: 15-25 minutes

Original release
- Network: Hum TV
- Release: 4 May – 7 December 2014

Uff Meri Family is a 2014 Pakistani sitcom directed by Azfar Ali, written by Hassan Ali and produced by Misbah Khalid of M&M Productions. It stars Naveen Waqar, Azfar Ali, Saif-e-Hassan and Amber Wajid. Premiering in May 2014, the series marked the collaboration of then real-life couple Waqar and Ali.

At the 3rd Hum Awards, it won Hum Award for Best Comic Sitcom.

== Cast ==
- Naveen Waqar
- Azfar Ali
- Saif-e-Hassan
- Amber Khan
- Bilal

== Awards ==
- Hum Award for Best Comic Sitcom - Misbah Khalid (M&M Productions).

== See also ==
- Halka Na Lo
- Extras (The Mango People)
