= Maheen Khan =

Pakistani fashion designer

- Born: Maheen Khan
- Occupations: Costume designer, fashion designer

Maheen Khan (Urdu: ماہین خان) is a Pakistani fashion and costume designer, also an award winner fashion designer for fashion labels like The Embroidery House, Maheen and Gulabo. She has done many national and international fashion events and shows. She undertook embroidery for the film Snow White and the Huntsman and television series The Jewel in the Crown. For the e-commerce, her brand is officially onboard on Studio by TCS.

== Career ==
Khan started her career in the fashion industry as a designer in 1972. She has designed costumes and embroidery for the films Sweeney Todd, The Phantom of the Opera, Elizabeth, and Elizabeth: The Golden Age. She has also done many costumes for theatres and opera.

Khan has created fashion shows in Pakistan and overseas. She is also the CEO of Fashion Pakistan Week. She has also designed for the international fashion events.

Khan also showcased her collection at the Milan Fashion Week where she got the title of Coco Chanel of the East. She also designed dresses for Benazir Bhutto, Jemima Khan, Ghinwa Bhutto, Princess Sarvath al-Hassan and Princess Salimah Aga Khan.
