= Adeel Razzaq =

Pakistani writer

- Born: Karachi, Pakistan
- Occupation: screenwriter
- Years active: 2007-present

Adeel Razzaq is a Pakistani writer. He is best known for his debut drama series Muqaddas (2015) and Deewana (2016), both aired on Hum TV. He received his first Best TV Writer nomination at 15th Lux Style Awards for Muqaddas. He is the head of content on Larachi Entertainment and a freelance writer at Geo Entertainment.

== Filmography ==
=== Television ===
- Muqaddas (2015)
- Deewana (2016)
- Kitni Girhain Baaqi Hain (Episode 14) (2017)
- Pukaar (2018)
- Thora Sa Haq (2019)
- Dulhan (2020)
- Bharaas (2020–21)
- Neeli Zinda Hai (2021)
- Mushkil (2022)
- Sar-e-rah (2023)

== Awards and nominations ==
- 2016: Lux Style Award for Best TV Writer - Nominated.
