= Amna Babar =

Pakistani supermodel

- Born: Amna Babar; December 28, 1992 (age 33)
- Other name: Amna B.
- Occupation: Model
- Years active: 2010–present

Amna Babar (born December 28, 1992) is a Pakistani model. Winning the Best Emerging Talent - Fashion award at 13th Lux Style Awards in 2014, and received her first Lux Style Award nomination as Best Model Female at 14th Lux Style Awards and Best Model Female at 3rd Hum Awards and 4th Hum Awards respectively.

Khawar Riaz and has since then collaborated with many renowned names like Ammar Belal, Fahad Hussayn, Ali Zeeshan, Ather Shahzad, Guddu Shani, Maraam & Aabroo, Deeves, Nilofer Shahid, Saim Ali and Rana Noman Haq. She regularly appears on PFDC Sunsilk Fashion Week and Pakistan Fashion Week.

With a career spanning of just a half-decade, she has established herself as one of the leading fashions models of the country, appearing at Pakistan Fashion Design Council fashions shows, seminars and fashion weeks. Additionally, she has been the brand ambassador of Sana Salinas's Lawn for three years. She stated, "It's my third year [being the lawn ambassador for Sana Safinaz]." After gaining widespread acclaim she won the Best Emerging Talent - Fashion at 13th Lux Style Awards and received her first Model nomination for Best Model - Female at 14th Lux Style Awards, which she lost to supermodel and actress Amna Ilyas. Discussing Ilyas's win she said, "I didn't win [the award]. I barely have five years of experience in the field," she explained, "In my opinion, Amna Ilyas deserved to win [and if not her, then] Nooray Bhatti. Not only were they the right contenders, but they’ve also been in the industry for eight years. So, better luck next time to me,”. She subsequently received Hum Award for Best Model Female nominations at 3rd Hum Awards, 4th Hum Awards and recently took home the award of Best Model - Female at the 17th Lux Style Awards, held at the Expo Center in Lahore, Pakistan.

Regarding her acting career she explained, "I am currently stressing on my modelling career and giving it my best shot," adding that she has no plans of venturing into films for at least two years. "I am not planning to step into the world of films anytime soon. But if I get an extremely good offer, I might just take it." She further states about her screen debut, "I would certainly opt for a Pakistani film for my first project. Bollywood bohot door ki baat hai. Pehlay apni Pehchan Pakistan mein tou bana lein. [Bollywood is too far-fetched. I would like to be recognized in Pakistan first],".

== Music videos ==
Year	Music Video	Role
2012	Teri Yaad	model
2013	Desi Thumka	model
2013	Soni Teri Akhiya	model

== Awards and nominations ==
Year	Award	Category	Result	Ref.
2014	13th Lux Style Awards	Best Emerging Talent - Fashion	Won	
2015	14th Lux Style Awards	Best Model - Female	Nominated	
2015	3rd Hum Awards	Best Model Female	Nominated	
2016	4th Hum Awards	Best Model Female	Nominated	
2017	16th Lux Style Awards	Best Model - Female	Nominated	
2018	17th Lux Style Awards	Best Model - Female	Won	
