= Fariya Hassan =

Pakistani actress

- فاریہ حسن
- Born: 17 December 1993 (age 32); Lahore, Pakistan
- Education: University of Lahore
- Occupations: Actress; Model
- Years active: 2014 – present

Fariya Hassan is a Pakistani actress and model. She is known for her roles in dramas Muqaddas, Shanakht, Maikay Ki Yaad Na Aaye, Ahsas, Tere Bina and Raqs-e-Bismil.

== Early life ==
Fariya was born on 17 December 1993 in Lahore, Pakistan. She completed her studies from University of Lahore.

== Career ==
Fariya made her acting debut in 2014. She was noted for her roles in the dramas Shanakht, Riffat Apa Ki Bahuein, Mol, Preet Na Kariyo Koi and Muqaddas. Then she appeared in dramas Maikay Ki Yaad Na Aaye, Laikin, Main Kaisy Kahun, Kahan Tum Chalay Gye, Diyar-e-Dil and Dekho Chaand Aaya. In 2019 she appeared in the movie Talash as Tania with Noaman Sami and Ahmed Zeb. Since then she has appeared in dramas Maryam Periera, Bari Phuppo, Tere Bina, Ahsas, Beqadar and Raqs-e-Bismil.

== Filmography ==
=== Television ===
Year	Title	Role	Network
2014	Shanakht	Ayesha	Hum TV
2015	Mol	Sonia	Hum TV
2015	Muqaddas	Annie	Hum TV
2015	Diyar-e-Dil	Hafsa	Hum TV
2015	Riffat Apa Ki Bahuein	Sana	ARY Digital
2015	Aitebaar	Samna	Aaj Entertainment
2015	Preet Na Kariyo Koi	Saima	Hum TV
2016	Maikay Ki Yaad Na Aaye	Shehzeena	Geo TV
2016	Main Kaisy Kahun	Nisha	Urdu 1
2016	Dekho Chaand Aaya	Zoya	Geo Entertainment
2016	Kahan Tum Chalay Gye	Shiza	Geo TV
2016	Ahsas	Nimra	Urdu 1
2017	Laikin	Kiran	A-Plus
2017	Tere Bina	Bushra	Geo Entertainment
2018	Maryam Periera	Jenny	TV One
2018	Bari Phuppo	Ayesha	A-Plus
2019	Mazaaq Raat	Herself	Dunya News
2020	The Mazedaar Show With Aadi Faizan	Herself	TV One
2020	Raqs-e-Bismil	Sitara	Hum TV
2022	Beqadar	Neelam	Hum TV
2023	Mehar Mah	Samreen	Express Entertainment
2023	Mein Kahani Hun	Alvina	Express Entertainment
2024	Chand Nagar	Kainaat	BOL Entertainment
2024	Raaz	Nimra	Green Entertainment
2024	Bhakt Hazari	Bhakt Hazari	PTV
2024	Yaar-E-Mann	Sana	Green Entertainment
2024	BOL Kahani	Nida	BOL Network
2024	Haq Mehar	Zobia	Geo Entertainment

=== Telefilm ===
Year	Title	Role
2016	Bitiya Hamaray Zamanay Mein	Ushna

=== Film ===
Year	Title	Role
2019	Talash	Tania
