= Peeli Patti Aur Raja Jani Ki Gol Dunya =

Studio album by Noori
- Released: September 10, 2005
- Recorded: 2004–2005 at Digital Fidelity Studio in Lahore, Pakistan
- Genre: Pop rock Alternative rock
- Length: 41:51
- Label: Sadaf Stereo
- Producer: Ali Noor, Mekaal Hasan

Noori chronology
Suno Ke Main Hun Jawan (2003)	Peeli Patti Aur Raja Jani Ki Gol Dunya (2005)	Begum Gul Bakaoli Sarfarosh (2015)

Singles from Peeli Patti Aur Raja Jani Ki Gol Dunya
- 1. "Khuttay Te Tho Uttay" Released: February 17, 2005; 2. "Nishaan" Released: September 15, 2005; 3. "Meray Log" Released: November 7, 2006

Professional ratings
Review scores
Source	Rating
Pakistani Music Channel	4.0/5 stars

Peeli Patti Aur Raja Jani Ki Gol Dunya (Urdu: پیلی پتی اور راجہ جانی کی گول دنیا) is the second album released by Pakistani pop/rock band Noori. The album was released on 10 September 2005. Noori's singles from this album were "Nishaan", "Meray Log" and "Kuttay Te Tho Uttay".

Singles like "Kuttay Te tho Uttay" and "Nishaan" did well at music charts.

== Concept ==
This second album by Noori was a follow-up on where Suno Ke Main Hun Jawan left off. It talks about what happens when the ever so energetic and hopeful youth grows up and faces the realities of the world. The discontentment and suffering which arises in this growing up, creates an indifferent and self-centered individual, who finds escape routes in things like drugs and other short-lived pleasures.

Peeli Patti Aur Raja Jani Ki Gol Dunya is a call against such indifference. It depicts reality as it exists in our society today, and begs for a reconsideration of the direction people are carving out for themselves in these times of turmoil. Musically, the album brought out a darker and maturer side of the band – something they carried well with their new, don't-give-a-damn image of long hair and beards. Apart from popularity, it brought a newfound respect for the band – not just as musicians but as individuals who cared for society and genuinely wanted to make a difference.

Their track, Kuttay received widespread criticism, and the music video was also banned from the local television channels. So a second video was made for the track. However, this track has given a new concept, by mixing rock music with Punjabi.

== Track listing ==
All music composed & arranged by Ali Noor except for Jo Meray. Jo Meray composed by Ali Hamza.

Peeli Patti aur Raja Jani ki Gol Dunya
No.	Title	Writer(s)	Length
1.	"Nishaan"	Ali Hamza	3:40
2.	"Khalla"	Ali Noor, Ali Hamza	3:19
3.	"Mein"	Ali Hamza	4:21
4.	"Peeli Patti Aur Raja Jani"	Ali Noor	5:44
5.	"Ooncha (feat. Ali Azmat)"	Ali Noor, Shahnawaz Zaidi	4:30
6.	"Jo Meray"	Ali Hamza	3:41
7.	"Sari Raat Jaga"	Ali Noor	4:41
8.	"Aarzoo"	Ali Hamza	5:29
9.	"Meray Log"	Ali Noor	4:31
10.	"Kuttay Te To Uttay"	Ali Hamza	1:55

== Personnel ==
All information is taken from the CD.

Noori

- Ali Noor: lead vocals, lead guitar
- John "Gumby" Louis Pinto: drums
- Ali Hamza: rhythm, vocals
- Muhammad Ali Jafri: bass guitar

Additional musicians

- Backing vocals on "Ooncha" by: Ali Azmat
- Backing Vox on "Peeli Patti Aur Raja Jani": Mandana Zaidi
- Backing Vox on "Ooncha": Sasha Zaidi

Production

- Produced by Ali Noor
- Recorded & Mixed at Digital Fidelity Studios, Lahore, Punjab
- Guitar sound engineer: Mekaal Hasan, Muhammad Ali Jafri
- Assisted by Mekaal Hasan
- Photography: Mandana Zaidi
- Art direction & design: Atif Ghauri
- Album art: Atif Ghauri
