= Iffat Rahim =

Pakistani actress and model (born 1972)

- عفت رحیم
- Born: Iffat Rahim; 11 February 1972 (age 54); Lahore, Pakistan
- Education: Master of Fine Arts
- Alma mater: Punjab University
- Occupations: Actress; Model; Host; Writer; Novelist; Painter; Activist
- Years active: 1988 - present
- Spouse: Omar (husband)
- Children: Noor-e-Jehan (daughter)

Iffat Rahim, also known as Iffat Omar (in Punjabi and Urdu: عفت رحیم), née Rahim, is a Pakistani actress, model, host, and writer who achieved success in the late 1980s and 1990s.

Iffat has two Lux Style Award for Best TV Actress nominations. In 2023, she was awarded PTV Icon award by the Prime Minister of Pakistan Shehbaz Sharif for her contributions to the media industry.

== Early life ==
Iffat completed her early education from Escena Foundation in Gulberg. She went to Government College for Girls at Lahore and got a degree of Bachelors. Later she went to Punjab University at Lahore and did her masters in Fine Arts.

== Career ==
Iffat was noticed by journalist Khalida Yousaf when she saw her picture and she encouraged her towards acting and modeling. She started working as a model in her early teens and debuted as an actress in drama Nangay Paon. Later she worked in multiple PTV dramas. She is known for her role as Aapa Ji (Rukhsana) in the Pakistani drama series Mohabbat Aag Si which created acclaim and recognition including Award for Best Actor Female Jury.

She won an award for best fashion magazine host at the Indus TV's first award show in 2004. She has also participated in Mehman Nawaz Reality Cooking show on See TV and made up to the semi-final. In 2019, she produced and hosted the web series, Say It All with Iffat Omer.

== Media image ==
Iffat often stays in the limelight. She is very vocal about protection of women's rights and has a liberal approach. She consistently voices her opinion through her X (Twitter) account. She often criticized the former Prime Minister of Pakistan Imran Khan for his misogynistic remarks.

She has a YouTube channel "Say It All With Iffat Omar" where she interviews celebrities. Her interviews are well received by the audience.

=== Cybercrime case ===
In a 2018 tweet, Meesha Shafi accused Ali Zafar for sexual harassment. Iffat voiced her support for Shafi, despite Zafar denied the claims and started a legal battle. He launched a cybercrime case as well, where the Federal Investigation Agency also booked the actress.

== Personal life ==
Iffat married Omar, a CSS Officer, producer, and director. They have a daughter, Noor-e-Jehan.

== Filmography ==
=== Television series ===
Year	Title	Role	Notes
1993	Nangay Paon	Nida	PTV
1995	Uraan	Sara	PTV
1995	Moaf Keejiay Ga	Herself	STN
1995	Kahani Ghar - To To	Tahira	PTV
1997	Family Front	Seema	PTV
1998	Kanch Kay Par	Raheela	PTV
	Butterflies		
	Aap Jaisa Koi		
	Dil Ki Lagi		
1998	Ghulam Gardish	Rubab	PTV
1998	Naqaab	Naila	PTV
1998	Kaanch Ke Par	Raheela	PTV
1999	Barzakh	Rashida	STN
2000	Mera Ishq Bhi Tu	Dilaram	PTV
2002	Mohabatien	Samina	PTV
2004	Baaji	Farkhanda	PTV
2005	Bano Ko Pehchano	Bano	Geo TV
2006	Sitam	Maheen	PTV
2007	Adhi Muhabbat	Samia	PTV
2008	Oops	Tabinda	ARY Digital
2010	Talluq	Saba	Geo Entertainment
2010	Thori Si Wafa Chahiye	Rania	
2010	Chemistry	Maryam	
2011	Dil Behkay Ga	Sanobar	PTV
2012	Piyas	Sophia	PTV
2012	Aik Thi Paaro	Zara	TV One
2013	Mera Ishq Bhi Tu	Dil Ara	PTV
2014	Pehchaan	Kukoo	
2014	Adhura Milan	Noor-ul-Ain	
2015	Dooriyan	Sana	
2015	Mohabbat Aag Si	Rukhsana	Hum Award for Best Actress
2015	Iltija Hai Meri	Samiya	
2016	Mannat	Mehrunnisa	
2016	Mazaaq Raat	Herself	
2016	Kitni Girhain Baaki Hain: Part 2	Abida / Iffat / Mehru	Episode 19, 21, 29
2016	Thori Si Bewafai	Rania	
2017	Mujhay Jeenay Do	Saeeda	
2017	Larka Karachi Ka Kudi Lahore Di	Natasha	
2017	Imam Zamin	Ayesha	
2017	Aangan	Laila Asim	
2017	Kabhi Socha Na Tha	Nosheen	
2018	Noor ul Ain	Ghazala	
2018	Haiwan	Kulsoom	
2020	Mazaaq Raat	Herself	
2020	Mehar Posh	Shakeela	
2021	Makafat Season 3	Najma	
2021	Berukhi	Nazia	
2021	Aye Musht-e-Khaak	Shakeela	
2021	Dour	Kulsoom	
2022	Mazaaq Raat	Herself	
2024	Inspector Sabiha	Khadija	Express Entertainment
2024	Faraar	Meera	Green Entertainment

=== Telefilm ===
Year	Title	Role	Notes
1999	Dhund	Seema	
2017	Pyaar Ki Love Story	Parveen	
2019	Gul-e-Rana Ki Bhawajain	Arifa	

=== Film ===
Year	Title	Role	Notes
2013	Anjuman	Zarine Wajahat	
2019	Laal	Behram's mother	
2020	Kalasha- A Journey of Hope	Mona	
2022	London Nahi Jaunga	Zohra Nawaz	
2023	Meet Aur Harmeet	Iffat	
2024	Taxali Gate	Shehla Raza	

=== Host ===
Year	Title	Role	Notes
2005	Subha Say Jhoom Lay Hum	Herself	
2019	Say It All with Iffat Omer	Herself	

== Awards and nominations ==
Year	Ceremony	Category	Project	Result	Ref.
2004	1st Indus Awards	Best Host	Best Fashion Magazine Host	Won	
2006	5th Lux Style Awards	Best Television Actress (Satellite)	Bano Ko Pehchano	Nominated	
2013	Tarang Housefull Awards	Best Supporting Actress	Anjuman	Nominated	
2015	4th Hum Awards	Best Actress	Mohabbat Aag Si	Won	
2015	4th Hum Awards	Best Actress Popular	Mohabbat Aag Si	Nominated	
2016	15th Lux Style Awards	Best Television Actress	Mohabbat Aag Si	Nominated	
2019	ARY Digital- Social Media Drama Awards 2018	Best Supporting Actress	Haiwan	Nominated	
2023	PTV Icon Awards	National Icon Award	Contribution to Media Industry	Won	
