= Suno Ke Main Hun Jawan =

Studio album by Noori
- Released: October 25, 2003
- Recorded: 2002–2003 at Digital Fidelity Studio in Lahore, Pakistan
- Genre: Pop rock Alternative rock
- Length: 51:35
- Label: Sadaf Stereo
- Producer: Ali Noor, Muhammad Ali Jaffari, Mekaal Hasan

Noori chronology
Suno Ke Main Hun Jawan (2003)	Peeli Patti Aur Raja Jani Ki Gol Dunya (2005)

Singles from Suno Ke Main Hun Jawan
- 1. "Manwa Re" Released: October 7, 1998; 2. "Tum Hans Diyay" Released: April 26, 2002; 3. "Jana Tha Hum Ne" Released: October 17, 2002; 4. "Gana No.1" Released: February 15, 2003; 5. "Dil Ki Qasam" Released: August 3, 2003; 6. "Suno Ke Main Hun Jawan" Released: January 13, 2004; 7. "Neend Ayay Na" Released: May 22, 2004

Professional ratings
Review scores
Source	Rating
Pakistani Music Channel	4.0/5 stars

Suno Ke Main Hun Jawan (Urdu: سنو کے میں ہو جوان) was the debut studio album of the Pakistani pop/rock band Noori. The album was released on 25 October 2003 and was a commercial success. Singles from this album were "Suno Ke Main Hu Jawan", "Tum Hans Diyay", "Gana No. 1", "Dil Ki Qasam", "Neend Ayay Na", "Manwa Re" and "Jana Tha Hum Ne".

== Track listing ==
All music composed & arranged by Ali Noor.

Suno Ke Main Hun Jawan
No.	Title	Writer(s)	Length
1.	"Suno Ke Main Hun Jawan"	Ali Noor	3:50
2.	"Dil Boley"	Ali Noor	3:56
3.	"Tum Hans Diyay"	Ali Noor	4:23
4.	"Dobara Phir Se"	Faraz “Channi” Masud	2:23
5.	"Gana No.1"	Ali Noor	3:43
6.	"Bol"	Ali Hamza	4:29
7.	"Dil Ki Qasam"	Ali Noor, Ali Hamza	4:59
8.	"Neend Ayay Na"	Ali Noor, Ali Hamza	4:22
9.	"Jana Tha Hum Ne"	Ali Noor	4:14
10.	"Manwa Re"	Aqeel Rubi	3:27
11.	"Jaa Re"	Ali Hamza	3:44
12.	"Dobara Phir Se (Acoustic)"	Faraz “Channi” Masud	3:04
13.	"Hum Bhooley"	Zehra Nigah	4:17

== Personnel ==
All information is taken from the CD.

Noori

- Ali Noor: lead vocals, lead guitar, keyboards
- John "Gumby" Louis Pinto: drums
- Ali Hamza: rhythm, vocals
- Muhammad Ali Jafri: bass guitar

Additional musicians

- Guitars and Bass on "Hum Bhoolay": Mekaal Hasan

Production

- Produced by Mekaal Hasan, Ali Noor & Muhammad Ali Jaffri
- Recorded & Mixed at Digital Fidelity Studios, Lahore, Punjab
- Guitar sound engineer: Mekaal Hasan, Muhammad Ali Jafri
- Drums engineer: Mekaal Hasan
- Assisted by Mekaal Hasan
