= Alvida =

- Alvida title screen
- Genre: Drama; Romance
- Written by: Samira Fazal
- Directed by: Shahzad Kashmiri
- Starring: Sanam Jung; Imran Abbas Naqvi; Zahid Ahmed; Naveen Waqar
- Theme music composer: Bilal Allah Ditta
- Opening theme: "Alvida" by Shafqat Amanat Ali
- Composer: Sahir Ali Bagga
- Country of origin: Pakistan
- Original language: Urdu
- No. of episodes: 20

Production
- Producers: Momina Duraid; Humayun Saeed; Shehzad Naseeb
- Production locations: Karachi, Sindh, Pakistan Dubai, UAE
- Cinematography: Abd-ul-Qudoos Kashmiri
- Editors: Mehmood Ali; Alam Azeemi; Ikhlaq Ahmad; Bilal Qureshi
- Camera setup: Multi-camera setup
- Running time: 36–40 minutes
- Production companies: MD Productions; Six Sigma Plus

Original release
- Network: Hum TV
- Release: 11 February – 24 December 2015

Alvida (Urdu: الوداع, lit. 'Farewell') is a 2015 Pakistani romantic drama television series. It was directed by Shahzad Kashmiri, produced by Momina Duraid, Humayun Saeed, Shehzad Naseeb and written by Samira Fazal. It starred couple of Dil-e-Muztar, Sanam Jung, Imran Abbas Naqvi along with Naveen Waqar, Zahid Ahmed and Sarah Khan in lead roles. The series premiered on 11 February 2015 on Hum TV, and aired every Wednesday at 8pm. It gathered critical acclaim for the acting, writing and soundtrack.

== Summary ==
=== Part 1 ===
Haya (Sanam Jung) is in love with her cousin Hadi (Imran Abbas Naqvi) who is returning from London and Somalia after being away for five years.

Haya's mother died when she was young and her father couldn't look after her. She has two other sisters, Uroosa and Lubna, who were raised by their mother's sister (khala). Haya has been raised by her uncle (her father's elder brother) and aunt, who are Hadi's parents. Hadi is a successful and famous gynecologist. Haya thinks that he is coming back for her but actually Hadi is returning for Uroosa (Naveen Waqar), whom he loves. When Hadi announces his desire to marry Uroosa, Haya is left in shock and anger. She does all she can to ruin their wedding with the help of her childhood friend Farisa (Sarah Khan) who is also a cousin of Hadi and Haya. Nevertheless, the wedding takes place and on Uroosa and Hadi's wedding night, Haya blurts out her feelings to Uroosa. Uroosa is shocked and so is Hadi. The next day Haya decides to leave the house and takes refuge with her friend Kaukab. Her friend's husband has bad intentions and Haya also slaps him. Haya leaves Kaukab's house and starts living in a hostel. Here, she works as a teacher. She meets her colleague Rameez (Zahid Ahmed). While Haya had left the house, Uroosa and Hadi go for their honeymoon and after returning, they find out that Uroosa is pregnant. Both are very happy at the thought of becoming parents. When Haya finds out about this, she gets even more depressed. However, Uroosa is suffering from pre-eclampsia and Hadi operates on Uroosa but she dies during childbirth. Hadi starts blaming himself for his wife's death.

=== Part 2 ===
Hadi holds himself responsible for Uroosa's death as he was the one operating on her. Fareesa is given the job of looking after the baby. Meanwhile, Haya gets friendly with Rameez and the two start hanging out together. When Fareesa realizes how rich Hadi is she tries to woo him and ditches her boyfriend Saim. She talks to Haya and tells her never to come back while Haya is also unaware of Uroosa's death. Meanwhile, Fareesa is living in Hadi's house and creates misunderstandings within the family. She tells Hadi that his mom wants them married and she tells Hadi's mom that Hadi is interested in her. Hadi's mom forces Hadi to marry Fareesa against his will. Meanwhile, Haya returns on their wedding day as she has found about Uroosa's death from her friend Kaukab who meets her to apologize and tells her that her husband, Faiz (Danish Nawaz) died. She is stunned to see Hadi married to Fareesa. Fareesa is really happy as she has finally got the life she dreamed of. She wants to get rid of Haya as she believes that Hadi will fall in love with Haya. Haya agrees to leave. Haya goes to live with her father. When Fareesa finds out that Haya and Hadi spent a night together talking and having fun, she blames Hadi for deceiving her. Hadi in a fit of rage slaps Fareesa. Haya is really depressed as Fareesa comes to her house and says that she will never let Haya steal her husband. When Hadi finds out about Haya's friendship with Rameez, he is jealous and tells her to never talk to Rameez again. Haya and Rameez become good friends and Rameez even proposes to Haya. Haya accepts the proposal. On the other hand, Hadi is getting jealous of Rameez. Saim who was rejected by Fareesa has come back from America. Now he has a job in America and is quite rich. He and Fareesa accidentally meet in the mall and their friendship rekindles. Rameez goes to Haya's house to talk about his and Haya's marriage. Haya's father and Haya's Taya (Hadi's father) asks him various questions and at last they decide that Rameez is the man for Haya. Hadi constantly tries to persuade Haya not to marry Rameez, as he thinks Rameez is not the perfect man for her. She refuses. Rameez's and Haya's marriage preparations begin. Haya and Hadi's friendship rekindles and they talk with each other like they were before. Haya feels like what she is doing is wrong, she should not marry Rameez. So, she starts to ignore him. Rameez scared of why Haya isn't replying to his call, sneaks into her house through the terrace. He meets Haya at last, who gets surprised and scared when she sees him. Unfortunately Hadi sees them but allows them to talk upon Rameez's request. After a while Rameez leaves. Haya constantly thinks of her decision of marrying Rameez. Her Tayee (Hadi's mother) asks her that if she wants she can stop her marriage. They are not pressurizing her to marry Rameez. She says that she is happy in marrying Rameez, she is just a bit nervous. Haya's and Rameez's marriage take place.

=== Part 3 ===
After their marriage takes place they return to Rameez's home and Rameez takes a few pictures of Haya and suddenly she faints. Rameez takes her to the hospital. He even informs Hadi. Hadi reaches the hospital immediately. Rameez asks him if he can stay with Haya for sometime in the hospital as he has to go back home. Hadi agrees. When Hadi and Haya are in the hospital's room, Rameez takes a few pictures of them through a small window of the room. Hadi tells Haya that now she is not alone, she has a husband, she should think about Rameez. When Haya and Rameez reach back home, Rameez tells her that how he had always wished for a house in which his beautiful wife and he would cook food for themselves together. It is then shown that Haya is leaving for her Taya (Hadi's father) and Tai (Hadi's mother) house for some days according to a rasam (custom). Rameez asks her to stay but she says that she would be back in some days. Then she leaves.

At her Tai's house Haya receives Rameez's call, who asks her to come back as he is feeling alone. When Haya refuses to do so, Rameez says that he is coming to her house right now because he is missing her a lot. She says that it's not possible as his house is far away from her house, it would take hours to reach there, and she is stunned when she turns around to see Rameez standing near the door. Haya learns that Hadi has started taking patients (which he had stopped before because of the death of his first wife Uroosa). Her Tayee in shock talks to Haya and says that I wonder how he agreed on taking cases once again. Haya says it's because of me, I asked him to do so. She says that there should be a party because it's a big news. They should celebrate. Her Tayee even tells Rameez about this, who also seems to be happy.

On the other hand, Fareesa goes to meet Saim, who tells her that he would be leaving for America soon as he cannot stay longer. His company has asked him to come back. Fareesa gets angry. She says to him that she cannot live without him, to which he replies by saying that he cannot too. As Fareesa had gone to meet Saim and refused to prepare lunch for Hadi, which is to be sent to his hospital, Haya prepares his lunch. While Haya is preparing his lunch Rameez arrives there and asks her whether she would prepare the lunch for him in the same way, as she is preparing for Hadi. She replies "Yes ! I would." When Hadi receives his lunch box at his hospital he sees that there is a note inside the lunch box as well. The note is from Haya and she has written on the note "Just for HS." Hadi smiles and begins eating his lunch.

When he arrives at his home, he is ecstatic to see the house's dining room decorated and everyone standing there waiting for him to cut the cake. He cuts the cake and suddenly Fareesa appears. She asks what is going on. Hadi's mother tells her that it's a celebration and also tells her the reason behind it. She says that why doesn't she ask him (Hadi) what happened that made him take this decision. But Haya, interrupts her. Hadi's mom takes him to a side and tells him that Haya is not willing to go back with Rameez. She says that Hadi know better than her about Haya, and requests him to ask her to leave, it will be better for her as well as you. Hadi leaves the party and goes to his room. Haya arrives there and asks him why he left the party and came here. He tells Haya that he is not interested in this party and she should leave him alone. He says that he is suffering from a headache and wants to rest. Haya asks him if her Tayee said something regarding her to him. He says no he just wants her to leave and live with her husband. She asks him that he is asking her to live with her husband, but before saying that he should first think about him and Fareesa and why they don't even live the same room, even when they are husband and wife. He says that it's not about him and Fareesa it's about Haya and Rameez. She says that she wants to leave Hadi and start her life with Rameez. At last he says "Yes !" Haya leaves his room. Feeling dejected, Haya then tells Rameez to take her back to their home. Once they reach their home, Rameez gifts her a dress and asks her to wear it. After that, he asks her if she would do everything that she does for HS. He shows her pictures that he took of her and Hadi in hospital. Haya gets shocked. Rameez asks her that does she think that he is a fool. He had seen her love for Hadi way before. He grabs her hand and hurts her when she is sleeping, for her to wake up get ready for his own entertainment. He asks her to make lunch and breakfast for him. And gets excited on seeing the lunchbox (apparently he had seen a dream about it). He tells Haya that he has finished off her balance on her phone and would take it with him. He has also disconnected landline and internet connection and anyway by which she could communicate with anyone. Haya gets perplexed about the happenings with her.

While Hadi is trying to get back to Fareesa, Fareesa avoids him. He sees her while she's talking to Saim. But Fareesa tells him that she was talking to her mother. Haadi still feels that she's lying because she kept changing the subject. Later Hadi tracks her and sees her with Saim in a public park. Hadi furiously reaches home and when Fareesa arrives, he questions her but she simply refuses to what Hadi saw. Later Rameez arranges a picnic, where they do ice skating and wall climbing and it is when Haya is uncomfortable doing all this but Rameez forces her to enjoy with him while Fareesa and Hadi notice Rameez's behaviour. Fareesa insists Saim to let them fly to USA but he is a bit reluctant to do so. In a heated argument, Fareesa says to Hadi that even if he thinks of divorcing her she will destroy Haya's life. Hadi finds no other way to solve the problem so he finally divorces Fareesa. Fareesa leaves the house while shouting that everyone in this house is mental and that she will bring everyone on the footpath. When she reaches Saim's house, he tells her that he was taking revenge from her because she left him just to marry Hadi. Fareesa is shocked and is left devastated while Saim kicks her out of her house and life. On the other hand, Rameez and Haya learn from Tayee that Hadi has divorced Fareesa. He starts shouting at Haya and calls it her plan. He chases Haya in the house when a sofa drops on his foot and he's hurt and when he catches Haya she accidentally hits him with a knife that injures his hand. Haya runs out of her apartment while Rameez is chasing her when Hadi clashes with Haya and takes her to his house. Haya is found to be pregnant but her Tayee, Taya and Hadi force her to live with them and leave Rameez.

=== Last Episode ===
Rameez is at his house. He is remembering his childhood when his father used to suspect his wife and used to blame that she had an affair with his boss and then used to beat her with a belt and this is shown the cause for his behaviour. Hadi and Haya's Taya (Hadi's father) are seen discussing the situation which Haya is facing. Hadi goes to Haya's room and starts talking to her about their past and how they used to be some time ago. Haya is on the bed and Hadi is on the floor talking when they tirelessly fall asleep. Haya suddenly wakes up and sees Rameez in front of her. Rameez has a pistol in his hand and is pointing it towards Hadi. Haya cries while Rameez orders her to quietly come with him or he will shoot Hadi. She agrees while leaving unnoticed Hadi asleep. Rameez takes Haya to his house and tells his childhood story to Haya. He takes off his belt and moves towards Haya. Hadi wakes up and finds out that Rameez has taken Haya and tells her mother who is shocked. He sits in the car and starts driving to Rameez's house. Meanwhile, Haya is shown running away from Rameez and he shouts at her and catches her. He grabs her firmly and says that she is impure and she was a treacherous wife and pushes her with a great force and she falls on the floor. Hadi reaches the building. He reaches the house but the door is locked. He starts opening it. Rameez is horrified and locks himself in the room. Hadi opens the door and finds Haya on the floor shredded in blood in an extremely critical condition. He takes her to the hospital. All the family members arrive at the hospital and they start praying for Haya's health. It is found that Haya's child has died in the womb and she is suffering from excessive bleeding and needs blood. Hadi operates her after some hesitation as he thinks that just like his surgery killed his ex-wife Uroosa, same will happen to Haya. After the operation, Haya's pulse is declining. Hadi cries in front of her. Haya's pulse stops! Hadi is shocked. But her pulse revives and she starts breathing. She moves to her house where she finds Hadi is moving to South Africa. She asks him to not leave her and finally declares her love for him. Hadi is satisfied and promises Haya for a more happy and peaceful life ahead and they decide to get married and live a happy life with Saadi (Uroosa and Hadi's son). They start laughing and as the soundtrack plays the series ends with Hadi and Haya hand in hand showing how true love can never fail.

== Cast ==
=== Main cast ===
- Sanam Jung as Haya
- Imran Abbas as Hadi Salman “HS”
- Sarah Khan as Farisa Hadi
- Zahid Ahmed as Rameez Ahmed

=== Supporting cast ===
- Naveen Waqar as Uroosa
- Mehmood Aslam as Salman
- Lubna Aslam as Zeenat
- Haris Waheed as Saim
- Danish Nawaz as Faiz
- Huma Rehan as Kaukab
- Khalifa Sajeeruddin as Haya's father

== Production ==
First announced in August 2014, the project was directed by Shahzad Kashmiri and starred Imran Abbas, Navin Waqar and Sanam Jung in leading roles. The production faced delays due to Abbas's unavailability. However, by May 2015, the filming was nearing completion, as revealed by Jung.

== Broadcast and release ==
With Pashto dubbing, the series broadcast on Hum Pashto 1. It broadcast in India on Zindagi in 2024.

It was available on iflix till 2019, and is currently available on Indian streaming service MX Player.

== Awards ==
Title	Award	Reception(s)	Result
4th Hum Awards	Best Onscreen Couple Popular	Sanam Jung & Imran Abbas Naqvi	Won
4th Hum Awards	Best Actor In A Negative Role	Zahid Ahmed	Won
4th Hum Awards	Best Actress Popular	Sanam Jung	Won
4th Hum Awards	Hum Award for Best Drama Serial Popular	Momina Duraid, Humayun Saeed and Shahzad Nasib	Nominated
4th Hum Awards	Best Actor Popular	Imran Abbas Naqvi	Nominated
4th Hum Awards	Best OST	Music by Sahir Ali Bagga, Performed by Shafqat Amanat Ali	Nominated
15th Lux Style Awards	Best Original Soundtrack	Shafqat Amanat Ali	Nominated

== Soundtrack ==
Soundtrack album by Shafqat Amanat Ali
- Released: January 2015
- Recorded: 2014
- Genres: Theme song, Television soundtrack
- Length: 4.26
- Language: Urdu
- Labels: M.D Productions; Six Sigma Entertainment
- Producers: Momina Duraid; Humayun Saeed; Shehzad Naseeb

The Theme song of Alvida is written by Imran Raza, and composed by Sahir Ali Bagga, while background score is composed by Bilal Allah Ditta. The music is a label of Momina Duraid Productions. The song is sung by Shafqat Amanat Ali.

=== Track listing ===
All lyrics are written by Imran Raza; all music is composed by Sahir Ali Bagga.

No.	Title	Artist(s)	Length
1.	Untitled	Shafqat Amanat Ali	4.26

== See also ==
- List of Pakistani actresses
- List of Pakistani actors
- List of Pakistani television serials
