= Dekho Chaand Aaya =

2016 Pakistani television series

- Genre: Family drama
- Written by: Farida Masroor
- Directed by: Najaf Bilgrami
- Starring: Sara Khan; Sajid Hassan; Nida Mumtaz; Fawad Jalal
- Country of origin: Pakistan
- Original language: Urdu
- No. of episodes: 27

Production
- Producer: Aijaz Aslam
- Production location: Karachi
- Running time: 37 - 38 minutes
- Production companies: Ice Media & Entertainment

Original release
- Network: Geo Entertainment
- Release: June 2016

Dekho Chand Aaya is a Pakistani Ramadan special drama serial aired on Geo Entertainment during Ramadan in 2016. The 27-episode drama aired throughout the month.

== Synopsis ==
Dekho Chand Aaya is a story of college love, where Hassan who comes from an affluent family deeply falls in love with Chand. Chand, on the other hand, likes Hassan but she is indifferent about the relationship. The protagonists are about to get married after Eid, but after Chand’s father suffers a heart attack, he wishes for her daughter to be married at the earliest.

Samia, Hassan’s sister-in-law, is facing a tough time in the family because she belongs to the middle class. She wants Chand to enter the house so that the entire focus moves on her, since she belongs to a lower income bracket.

Samia convinces the family to set another date, but Chand’s family finds out that Hassan has been a failure in studies. This comes as a shock to Chand; consequently, she confronts and humiliates Hassan that she has been cheated. Hassan calls off the marriage, but Samia convinces him to marry so that he can take revenge from Chand.

The main objective of Samia is to bring Chand so that she is no more competed with Sonia; Hassan’s another sister-in-law who is financially sound. Chand marries Hassan and the new step leads to a suppressed life, but she gradually emerges as a strong woman.

== Cast ==
- Sarah Khan as Chaand
- Fawad Jalal as Hassan (Chaand's husband)
- Sajid Hassan as Abbu Jaan (Chaand's father-in-law )
- Nida Mumtaz as Ammi Jaan (Chaand's mother-in-law)
- Aijaz Aslam as Mamu Jaan (in a special appearance as Chaand's mamu)
- Khaled Anam as Asif (Chaand's father)
- Sumbul Shahid as Tayi jaan (Hassan's Tayi)
- Beena Chaudhary as Chaand's aunt (Hassan's aunt)
- Tahir Kazmi as Jahangir(Hassan's elder brother)
- Naveed Raza as Bilal (Hassan's brother)
- Ayesha Toor as Sonia (Jahangir's wife)
- Maham Nizami as Samia (Bilal's wife)
- Fariya Hassan as Zoya (Hassan's sister)
- Humaira Bano as Shaheen (Chaand's mother)
- Hassan Khan as Affan (Love interest of Zoya)
- Hammad Khan as Ahmed (Chaand's younger brother)

== Soundtrack ==
The original soundtrack of "Dekho Chaand Aaya" is composed by Faakhir Mehmood and sung by Bushra Bilal.
