= Shahzad Noor =

Pakistani model and actor (born 1989)

- Born: 21 June 1989 (age 37); Karachi, Pakistan
- Occupations: Fashion model; Actor
- Years active: 2012–present

Shahzad Noor (Urdu: شہزاد نور; born 21 June 1989) is a Pakistani fashion model and actor.

== Early life ==
Noor was born into a Pashtun family in Karachi, Pakistan. He had improve his Urdu accent for his acting career.

== Career ==
=== Fashion model ===
He had his own printing press before being spotted by the stylist Khawar Riaz, who pushed him towards professional modelling.

He began his career as a fashion model in 2012 and over the years he would become the highest paid male model of Pakistan, also walking the runway for the Indian fashion designer Manish Malhotra.

He has won two Best Model Male awards at the 12th Lux Style Awards and 14th Lux Style Awards, respectively. He also received three consecutive nominations at Hum Awards as Best Model Male, winning two, in 2015 and 2016, while he also won the same award in the inaugural Hum Style Awards, also in 2016. In 2017 he was nominated during the 16th Lux Style Awards.

=== Actor ===
In 2015, Noor marked his screen debut with Geo TV's Tera Mera Rishta.

== Television series ==
Year	Title	Role	Channel	Notes
2015-2016	Tera Mera Rishta	Maiz	Geo Entertainment	Leading role
2016	Yeh Chahatein Yeh Shiddatein	Nawaz	Geo TV	Leading role
2016-2017	Yeh Ishq	Maaz	ARY Digital	Leading role
2017	Zaakham	Moosa	ARY Digital	Supporting role
2018	Khuwabzaadi	Fareed	TvOne	Leading role
2022	Kaala Doriya	Faraz	Hum TV	Supporting role
2023	Dil Pe Zakham Khaye Hain	Kamal	Hum TV	Leading role
2025	Sazawaar	Zaviyar	ARY Digital	Supporting role

== Awards and nominations ==
Year	Award	Category	Result	Ref.
2013	12th Lux Style Awards	Best Model - Male	Won	
2014	2nd Hum Awards	Best Model - Male	Nominated	
2015	3rd Hum Awards	Best Model - Male	Won	
2015	14th Lux Style Awards	Best Model - Male	Won	
2016	4th Hum Awards	Best Model - Male	Won	
2016	1st Hum Style Awards	Best Model - Male	Won	
2017	16th Lux Style Awards	Best Model - Male	Nominated	
2017	2nd Hum Style Awards	Best Model - Male	Nominated	
2018	17th Lux Style Awards	Best Model - Male	Nominated	
2018	3rd Hum Style Awards	Best Model - Male	Nominated	
2019	18th Lux Style Awards	Best Model - Male	Won	
