= March 2013 Karachi bombing =

Terrorist attack in Karachi, Pakistan

- Location: Abbas Town, Karachi, Pakistan
- Date: 3 March 2013
- Target: Shi'ite Muslims
- Attack type: Car bombings
- Deaths: 48
- Injuries: 200

The March 2013 Karachi bombing was a terrorist attack that struck a predominantly Shia area inside Abbas Town, Gulshan-e-Iqbal Town in Karachi, Pakistan on 3 March 2013. At least 48+ people were killed and more than 180+ others injured after a car bomb was detonated outside a Shia mosque, just as locals were leaving after the evening's services. As rescuers gathered to the scene of the bombings, a second blast caused even more destruction. Authorities suspected the Sunni militant group Lashkar-e Jhangvi of being behind the attacks.

This was the first major incident within the city since a wave of target killings left more than 300 dead in the summer of 2011.

== Arrest of suspects ==
Sindh police arrested three suspects involved in the blast, Shoaib Mehsud, Khalid Rehman Mehsud and Aurangzaib Mehsud. These are the members of Tehreek-e-Taliban Pakistan (TTP) and arrested during the targeted operation in Manghopir on 13 March 2013.

In 2024, Umer Farooq, a Tehreek-e-Taliban Pakistan militant and one of the prime accused of the attack was killed in an intelligence based operation. The suspect was also involved in the 2023 Karachi police station attack.
