= Khaled Anam =

Pakistani actor, producer, director and musician

- خالد انعم
- Born: 29 May 1960 (age 66); Karachi, Sindh, Pakistan
- Occupations: Actor; Producer; Singer
- Years active: 1979–present
- Notable work: Kahi Unkahi; Bhaagti Bareera; Muqaddas
- Relatives: Noor Mohammed Charlie (wife's grandfather)

Khaled Anam (Urdu: خالد انعم) is a Pakistani actor, producer and singer.

He has acted in various dramas, like Kahi Unkahi, Muqaddas, Bhaagti Bareera.

As a singer, he's best known for his rendition of Shah Hussain's Punjabi poem Peera Ho (1992).

== Early and personal life ==
=== Family background ===
Born and raised in Karachi, he is the youngest of six siblings. His father, originally from Madras, was in the British Army. His mother, originally a teacher who also sang for Radio Pakistan in the 1950s, was a Kashmiri who hailed from Sialkot. His family being inclined to arts, he himself learned to play the guitar and did theatre early on.

=== Education ===
He earned his Master's in journalism from the Karachi University and later did theatrical training courses with Grips Theatre in Germany.

=== Family ===
His wife Tehmina Khaled is an entertainment journalist and choreographer. She is the daughter of the late actor Latif Charlie, himself the son of comedian Noor Mohammed Charlie, and Masooma Shah, one of PTV's first actresses.

Tehmina and Khalid's sons, Ammar and Komail Anam, are both musicians. Komail is also an actor, making his acting debut in Hum TV's Chamak Damak.

== Career ==
Anam released his first album Ray Se Rail Chali in 1979 and has been associated with the TV industry as an actor since 1982.

After a decade of working in advertising and communications, Anam pursued a career in the media industry, working in operations and as content head with local media houses and successfully launched children's television shows.

== Awards and nominations ==
He received the Pride of Performance Award in 2018 for his contributions in the media industry and for promoting education through children's TV shows.

== Book ==
- Bachon kay Geet [Songs for Children], Oxford University Press, 2014. Illustrated children book containing songs and a hamd.

== Selected filmography ==
=== Television serials ===
Year	Drama	Role	Original network
1987	Ehsaas	Nadeem	PTV
1989	Tapish	Ahsan	PTV
1992	Kasak	Yasir	PTV
1992	Nadan Nadia	Sheikh Manzoor	PTV
1999	Sila		PTV
2011	Parsa	Gopal	Hum TV
2011	Humsafar	Khirad's Father	Hum TV
2012	Kahi Unkahi	Parvez	Hum TV
2015	Muqaddas	Jahanzeb	Hum TV
2016	Pakeeza	Ahmer	Hum TV
2016	Dekho Chaand Aaya	Asif	Geo Entertainment
2020	Dilruba	Junaid's father	Hum TV
2020	Pyar Ke Sadqay	Shanzey's father	Hum TV
2020	Ishqiya	Khalid	ARY Digital
2020	Uraan		Geo Entertainment
2020	Raja Ki Raji	Sadiq Hussain	ARY Digital
2020	Bulbulay (season 2)	Sidduiqi (Khoobsurat's father)	ARY Digital
2022	Taqdeer	Zubair	ARY Digital
2024	Achari Mohabbat		ARY Digital
2024	Gentleman	Waqar	Green Entertainment
2025	Goonj		Hum TV
2025	Main Manto Nahi Hoon	Khaled	ARY Digital

=== Films ===
Year	Film	Role	Ref.
2022	Carma	Asghar Shah	
2024	The Glassworker	Tomas Oliver (voice)	

== Discography ==
=== Albums ===
- Ray Se Rail Chali (1979)
- Khaled Anam (2023)
