= Sagar veena =

String instrument

The sagar veena (Urdu: ساگر وینا) is a plucked string instrument used in Punjab and developed in 1970 by Pakistani lawyer Raza Kazim. It has evolved from Vichitra veena in both structure and sound. Similar to the Carnatic Gottuvadhyam (Chitra Vina) and vichitra veena, it has no frets and is played with a slide.

Kazim's daughter Noor Zehra has been the only player of the sagar since its inception. At least 17 sagar veenas have been made since its inception, with each version different in variation and advancement from its predecessor. The sagar veena is being developed, studied, and researched at the Sanjan Nagar Institute of Philosophy and Arts in Lahore.
