= Noori =

Rock band from Pakistan

Noori نوری
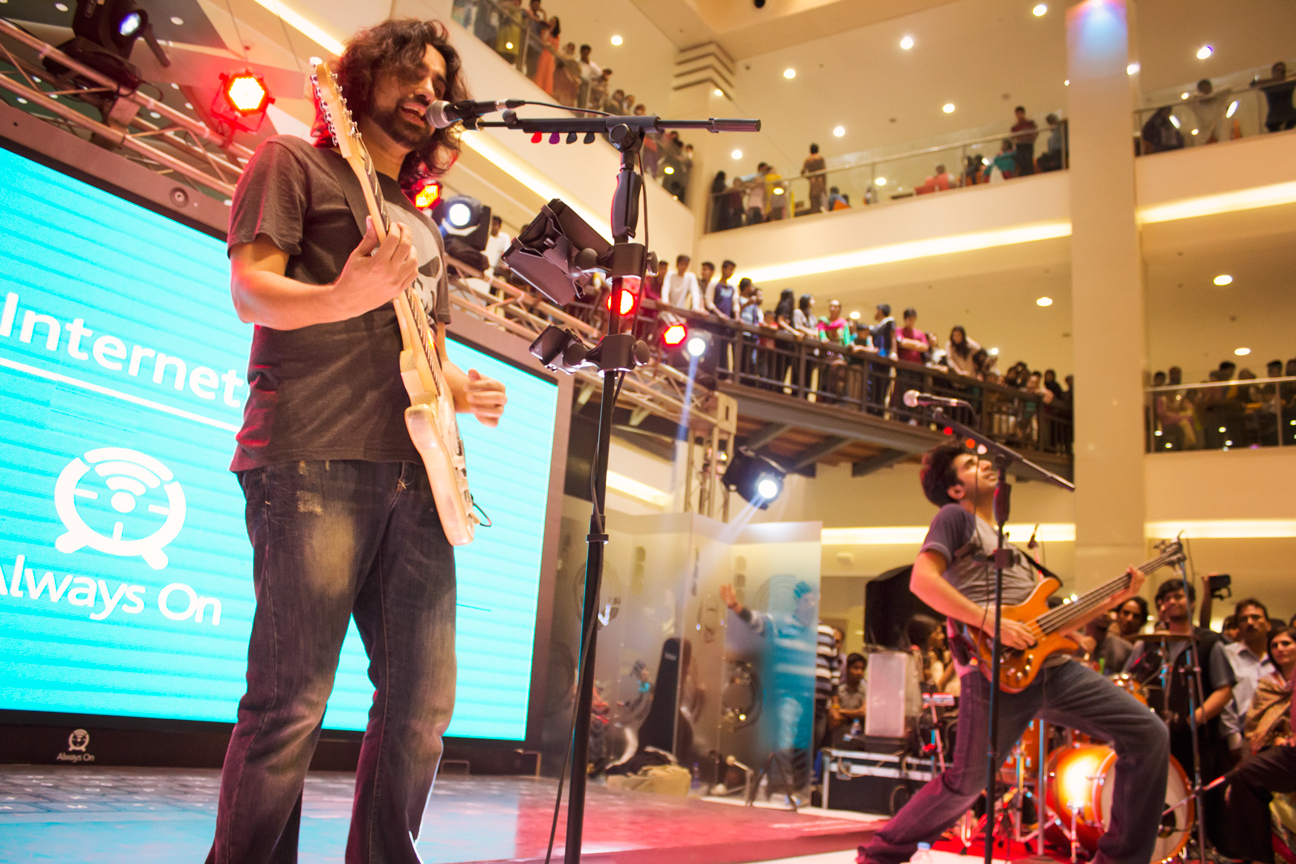
- Noori performing at the launch of HBL Always On, Dolmen City Mall, Karachi, November 2014. Visible from left to right are; Ali Noor and Ali Hamza.

Background information
- Origin: Lahore, Punjab, Pakistan
- Genres: Alternative rock; pop rock; sufi rock
- Years active: 1996–present (on hiatus from 2006 to 2008)
- Labels: Sadaf Stereo; BIY Records
- Members: Ali Noor; Ali Hamza; Kami Paul
- Past members: Salman Albert; Farhad Humayun; Murtaza Jaffar; Muhammad Ali Jafri; Louis J. Pinto (aka Gumby)
- Website: nooriworld.net

Noori (transl. Light) is a Pakistani rock band from Lahore, Punjab, Pakistan, formed in 1996. The group was formed by songwriter, lead vocalist, and guitarist, Ali Noor, along with his younger brother Ali Hamza, who were soon joined by bassist Muhammad Ali Jafri and drummer Salman Albert. Since the inception of the band, there have been many changes in the line-up; the only consistent members being the two brothers, Ali Noor and Ali Hamza. The band has produced songs such as "Suno Ke Mein Hoon Jawaan" and the epic "Manwa Re".

Internationally, the band has performed in countries like the United States, India, Afghanistan, United Arab Emirates and Norway.

== History ==
=== Early years (1998–2002) ===
The name of the band, Noori, is not derived from Ali Noor, lead vocalist and guitarist. Noori is a Persian word which means "light" and the concept behind the band was the light which shows you things with a different perspective.

Noori started seven years before their first album Suno Ke Main Hun Jawan which was released in 2003. Before Noori, Ali Noor and Muhammad Ali Jaffri worked with co-VEN and released an EP called Not in Your World. Noori has been known for its live acts.

=== Debut studio album, Suno Ke Mein Hun Jawan and rise to fame (2002–2005) ===
Noori's debut album, Suno Ke Main Hun Jawan developed a cult following before the album's release in 2003 through leaks on the Internet. It offered a complicated mix of sounds, starting from a folk-like "Manwa Re" that was actually written for a Pakistani film, to hard rock anthems to youth like the title track. Noori's debut album created whirlwinds across the Urdu-speaking community all over the world. A first of its kind, it introduced the genre of pop rock music to the Pakistani mainstream. In addition, the album was also a departure from the beaten track of chummy love songs and focused instead on inspiring the youth of Pakistan to take up the responsibility of doing something worthwhile for themselves and others. Thematically with songs urging listeners to change the world, that life is beautiful and professing women empowerment. Their album was about youth, their innocence, their dreams and how they feel about life. After their album release in 2003, they performed a duet, "Nayan Jahan", with Anaida which was a success.

=== Second studio album Peeli Patti Aur Raja Jani Ki Gol Dunya (2005–2007) ===
Their second album was a follow-up on where Suno Ke Main Hun Jawan left off. It talked about what happens when the ever so energetic and hopeful youth grows up and faces the realities of the world. The discontentment and suffering which arises in this growing up create an indifferent and self-centered individual, who finds escape routes in things like drugs and other short-lived pleasures. Titled Peeli Patti Aur Raja Jani Ki Gol Dunya, the album starts off in a somewhat hopeful mood and then travels through bitter experiences and ends up with resigned despair, peppered with taunts. The album dealt with a variety of subjects ranging from the problems and consequences of drug use to the collective apathy we all have descended into as individuals and as a society.

In 2005, Muhammad Ali Jafri, who was playing bass guitar for Noori, left the band and started his own business. In 2006, Noori parted ways with Louis J. Pinto (Gumby), the band's drummer.

=== "Do Dil" and appearances in Coke Studio (2008–2010) ===
In 2008, after a hiatus of almost two years, Noori came back with their new single "Do Dil".

In 2009, they performed at the Coke Studio Sessions along with artists like Atif Aslam, Zeb and Haniya, Ali Zafar, Saeen Zahoor and many other successful musicians. They performed a duet with Saeen Zahoor, "Aik Alif", a Sufi rock song which was a huge success. They also performed in the third episode of Coke Studio Sessions with their song "Jo Meray" which was performed in the format as it was originally composed by Ali Hamza in 2000. They performed "Sari Raat Jaga" on the fourth Coke Studio Session. On 14 August 2009, Noori performed "Kedaar" from their upcoming album at the last Coke Studio Session.

On 15 May 2010, the line-up for Coke Studio confirmed that Noori will feature in the third season along with many well-known artists and bands like Entity Paradigm, Aunty Disco Project, Karavan, Abida Parveen and many other successful musicians. On 20 June 2010, Noori performed a duet "Tann Dolay" with Zeb & Haniya at Coke Studio third season in the second session, 'Will'. On 10 July 2010, Noori released the studio version of the single "Tann Dolay" which also featured Zeb & Haniya. On 18 July 2010, Ali Noor and Ali Hamza did a live interview with Abdul Rauf and Maria Memon on the weekly morning show, Geo Pakistan, on Geo News. On 26 July 2010, the Noori brothers did a collaboration at the fourth Coke Studio session 'Form' for the song "Hor Vi Neevan Ho" with their mother, Noor Zehra Kazim, an accomplished player of the Sagar veena, an instrument developed by her father, Raza Kazim at the Sanjan Nagar Institute for Philosophy and Arts.

=== Begum Gul Bakaoli Sarfarosh (2015) ===
Noori performed three preview shows for their new album Begum Gul Bakaoli Sarfarosh in Lahore, Islamabad, and Karachi on 19, 20, and 21 September respectively. Each show had a limited audience of 111 people. Noori used the slogan "I am 1 in 333" for the promotion of these three shows. Although Noori set the release date for the new album at 30 September, it was later delayed to 9 October. Noori, through social media, once again announced the release of their album through a series of meet and greets in Lahore (9 October), Karachi (10 October) and Islamabad (11 October). Noori proclaimed that their album would only be available for sale at these three meets and greets, in order to build a one-on-one connection with the fans by eliminating the middleman. Noori later on performed in Peshawar on 22 November as well for the promotion of the album. Additionally, the album was made free to stream through Patari.pk as a Patari exclusive on 9 October.

=== Music director in Coke Studio Season 9 and Cornetto Pop Rock (2016) ===
Noori appeared as a music director in Coke Studio Season 9. Noori's first song in this capacity was "Aaja Re Moray Saiyaan", which was sung by Zeb Bangash and Ali Hamza. It was well received. The band collaborated on "Paar Channa De" with Shilpa Rao, which turned out to be successful as well.

Noori performed three concerts in Karachi, Lahore & Islamabad for Cornetto Pop Rock. Cornetto released their song featuring Quratulain Baloch, which did well on charts.

=== Return of Noori (2023) ===
In January 2023, Ali Noor announced the return of Noori through his social media pages. Noor announced the news by posting a picture of himself and his bandmate and brother, Ali Hamza. The caption on the picture said, "Yes, Noori is back…".

== Discography ==
Studio albums

- Suno Ke Main Hun Jawan (2003)
- Peeli Patti Aur Raja Jani Ki Gol Dunya (2005)
- Begum Gul Bakaoli Sarfarosh (2015)

Live albums

- Live at the Rock Musicarium (with Faraz Anwar) (2012)

== Film scores ==
Year	Song	Film	Co-singer(s)
2015	"Lahoriya"	Karachi Se Lahore	Shiraz Uppal
2015	"Aja re Aja"	Karachi Se Lahore	Shiraz Uppal
2015	"Baysabar"	Karachi Se Lahore	
2015	"Rabi Ralli"	Karachi Se Lahore	Zarrish

== Band members ==
Current members

- Ali Noor – vocals, backing vocals, lead guitar (1996–present)
- Ali Hamza – vocals, backing vocals, rhythm guitar (1996–present)
- Kami Paul – drums (2013–present)

Former members

- Louis J. Pinto (aka Gumby) – drums (2003–2006, 2011–2012)
- Salman Albert – drums, backing vocals (1996–1999)
- Farhad Humayun – drums (2000–2002)
- Murtaza Jaffar – rhythm guitar (2003)
- Mohd. Ali Jafri (bass)

Live concert (additional members 2012)

- Faraz Anwar – Lead guitar
- Zeeshan Pervez
- Awais Jaffery – Bass & Lead Guitar

Timeline

== Awards ==
- Noori won the award for the Best Rock Song for "Do Dil" at MTV Pakistan Music Awards in 2009.
- Noori was selected as "Picked Artist of the Month" on the Pakistani music channel called The Musik in June 2006.
- Noori has won the Best Rock Song Category Award for "Nishaan" in Indus Music Awards 2006.
- Noori has won the Ultimate Rock song Category Award for "Saari Raat Jaga" in MTV Pakistan Awards 2006.
- Noori has won Album of the Year award for Begum Gul Bakaoli Sarfarosh at the 15th Lux Style Awards

== Controversy ==
On 18 February 2022, a journalist named Ayesha Binte Rashid accused Ali Noor of sexual harassment. She called him a sexual harasser and predator in her Instagram post. In response to these allegations, Ali Noor said he is truly, deeply sorry.

== See also ==
- List of Pakistani music bands
