= 14th Lux Style Awards =

Pakistani awards ceremony

- Date: 30 September 2015
- Site: Expo Center, Karachi
- Hosted by: Fawad Khan; Mahira Khan; Yasir Hussain

Television coverage
- Network: ARY Digital

The 14th Lux Style Awards ceremony, presented by Lux to honor the fashion, music, films and Pakistani television of 2014 was held on 30 September 2015 beginning at 8:30 p.m PST. For this year ceremony no nominations were made for terrestrial and satellite categories in Television section as no satisfied entries for respective portfolios were submitted.

Promotional poster for the 14th LSA.

== Winners and Nominees ==
Following are the nominees announced by LUX on 16 July 2015 in 24 categories. Due to huge criticism and outrage on the awards, the nominations were revised and reannounced. Pyaray Afzal leads with total of seven nomination in five categories of Television section. Saleh Araf became the youngest winner of Best Actress category, as well as Pyare Afzal won a record breaking television awards in all of its categories for which it was nominated.

Winners are listed first in boldface:

Key
~~Strikethrough~~	denotes the entires that were nominated but later cancelled.

=== Film ===
Best Film	Best Director
**Na Maloom Afraad**; Dukhtar; O21	**Nabeel Qureshi – Na Maloom Afraad**; Dukhtar – Afia Nathaniel and Muhammad Khalid Ali; O21 – Jami and Summer Nicks
Best Actor	Best Actress
**Javed Sheikh – Na Maloom Afraad**; Fahad Mustafa – Na Maloom Afraad; Mohsin Abbas Haider – Na Maloom Afraad; Salman Shahid – Na Maloom Afraad; Ayub Khoso -021	**Saleha Aref – Dukhtar**; Samiya Mumtaz – Dukhtar; Urwa Hocain – Na Maloom Afraad

=== Television ===
Best Television Play	Best Television Director
**Pyaray Afzal (ARY Digital)**; Chup Raho (ARY Digital); Aasmanon Pay Likha (Geo TV); Main Bushra (ARY Digital); Marasim (A Plus); Shikwa (ARY Digital)	**Nadeem Baig – Pyaray Afzal (ARY Digital)**; Kashif Nisar – Sannata (ARY Digital); Mohsin Mirza – Aasmanon Pay Likha (Geo TV); Rubina Ashraf-Shikwa (ARY Digital); Yasir Nawaz – Shukk (ARY Digital)
Best Television Actor	Best Television Actress
**Hamza Ali Abbasi – Pyaray Afzal (ARY Digital)**; Firdous Jamal – Pyaray Afzal (ARY Digital); Syed Jibran – Chup Raho (ARY Digital); Faisal Quershi – Bashar Momin (Geo TV); Azfar Rehman – New York Se New Karachi (TV One)	**Ayeza Khan – Pyaray Afzal (ARY Digital)**; Saba Hameed – Pyaray Afzal (ARY Digital); Saba Qamar – Sannata (ARY Digital); Sajjal Ali – Sannata (ARY Digital); Sanam Jung – Mere Humdum Mere Dost (Urdu 1)
Best Television Writer
**Khalil-ur-Rehman Qamar – Pyaray Afzal (ARY Digital)**; Saji Gul – Sannata (ARY Digital); Sanam Mehdi – Main Bushra (ARY Digital); Samira Fazal – Chup Raho (ARY Digital); Zanjabeel Asim Shah – Marasim (A Plus)

=== Retrieved and New Nominations ===
After the announcement of nominations Hum TV deducted it's nominations and LSAs revised the nominations. The new nominations included:

- Aasmanon Pay Likha for Best TV Play
- Faysal Quraishi (Bashar Momin) for Best TV Actor
- Azfar Rehman (New York Se New Karachi) for Best TV Actor
- Zanjabeel Asim Shah (Marasim) for Best TV Writer

Nominees that were deducted by Hum TV:

- Sakina Samo (Muhabbat Subha Ka Sitara Hai) for Best TV Director
- Mekaal Zulfiqar (Muhabbat Subha Ka Sitara Hai) for Best TV Actor
- Noman Ijaz (Zindagi Teray Bina) for Best TV Actor
- Sarmad Sehbai (Laa) for Best TV Writer
- Momina Duraid (Sadqay Tumhare) for Best Original Soundtrack

=== Music ===
Best Album Of the Year	Best Music Video Director
**Dareeche – Zoe Viccaji**; Andholan – Mekaal Hasan; Tamam Alam Mast – Abbas Ali Khan	**Adnan Kandhar – Dil Main Chumke by Josh**; Aflatoon – Itni Chikni by Mooroo and Ali Gul Pir; Shahbaz Hamid Shigri and Aisha Linnea Akthar – Exploding Heart by Adil Omar; Sohail Javed – Tharki Sala by Annie Khalid; Yasir Jaswal – Roiyaan by Farhan Saeed
Best Original Soundtrack	Best Song of the Year
**Fizza Ali Meerza / Nabeel Qureshi –Na Maloom Afraad**; Afia Nathaniel / Muhammad Khalid Ali –Dukhtar; Saad Sultan – Jackson Heights (Urdu 1); Shahzad Nasib and Humayun Saeed –Nazdeekiyaan (ARY Digital)	"Roiyaan" – Farhan Saeed; "Badnaam" – Sibti & Spoonful; "Billi" – Saima Iqbal in Na Maloom Afraad; "Nadiya Par Par Karke" – Jimmy Khan; "Sub Akho Ali Ali" – Asrar
Best Emerging Talent in Music
Sara Haider; Masooma; Shajie Hassan; Young Stunners; Zunair Khalid

=== Fashion ===
Best Model of the Year - Male	Best Model of the Year - Female
**Shahzad Noor**; Athar Amin; Jahan-e-Khalid; Sharjeel Baig; Waleed Khalid	**Amna Ilyas**; Amna Babar; Cybil Chaudhry; Fayezah Ansari; Nadia Ali; Nooray Bhatty
Best Fashion Photographer	Best Hair and Makeup Artist
NFK Photography; Abdullah Haris; Ayaz Anis; Guddu Shani; Rizwan-ul-Haq	Nabila; Maram Aabroo; Natasha Khalid at Natasha's salon; Raana Khan; Shammal Qureishi at Toni & Guy, Lahore
Best Achievement in Fashion Design - Luxury Prèt	Best Achievement in Fashion Design - Prèt
Sana Safinaz at Sana Safinaz; Khadijah Shah at Elan; Maheen Karim at Maheen Karim; Shamaeel Ansari at Shamaeel Ansari; Shehla Chatoor at Shehla Chatoor	Sana Safinaz; Daaman; Gulabo; Nida Azwer; Sania Maskatiya
Best Achievement in Fashion Design - Lawn	Best Achievement in Fashion Design - Bridal
Sana Safinaz; Elan; Kayseria; Khaadi; Maria B	Nomi Ansari; Fahad Hussayn; Misha Lakhani; Sana Safinaz; Sania Maskatiya
Best Designer Menswear	Best Emerging Talent in Fashion
Ismail Farid; Ahmed Bham; Deepak Parwani; Hassan Sheheryar Yasin; Republic by Omar Farooq	Sadaf Kanwal – Model; Hasnain Lehri – Model; Mahgul Rashid – Designer; Muzi Sufi – Photographer; Saira*Shakira – Designers

== Controversies ==
Due to outrage and huge criticism on LUX for not nominating Bashar Momin, one of the most popular play of that year, in any of the category, nominations were revised by the jury after which the play was nominated with some other nominations were also add. However, the nominations belong to Hum TV were excluded on the team's own request. The reason was probably that last year Zindagi Gulzar Hai did not sweep all the categories as Humsafar did in 12th Lux Style Awards, so it was decided to not submit any portfolio by the network.

== Honorary awards ==
Lifetime Achievement Award

- Syed Noor

== See also ==
- 3rd Hum Awards
