= Mol (TV series) =

Pakistani drama television series

- Genre: Family drama Serial drama
- Written by: Amna Mufti
- Story by: Faysal Manzoor
- Directed by: Ilyas Kashmiri
- Starring: Faisal Qureshi; Naveen Waqar; Iqra Aziz
- Opening theme: "Dil Ka Jo Mol" by Bushra Bilal
- Composer: Naseer Turabi
- Country of origin: Pakistan
- Original language: Urdu
- No. of episodes: 20

Production
- Producers: Momina Duraid; Satish Anand
- Running time: 30–45 minutes

Original release
- Network: Hum TV
- Release: 30 May – 31 October 2015

Mol (Eng: Value) is a 2015 Pakistani television series based on the story by Faysal Manzoor that aired on Hum TV. It is produced by Momina Duraid under MD Productions. It has Faysal Qureshi, Naveen Waqar and Iqra Aziz in lead roles. At the 16th Lux Style Awards, the series received nomination for best original soundtrack (Bushra Bilal).

== Plot ==
Mol is essentially about balancing the rights of the individual with the demands of society. Shahryar Hassan's (Faysal Qureshi) family insists he marry his much younger cousin Sajal (Iqra Aziz), and in his desperation to escape a union he has absolutely no interest in, he applies for a transfer from Karachi to the provincial but ancient city of Sukkur. As a Deputy Commissioner, he meets Imtiaz Saheb (Munawer Saeed), his subordinate in Sukkur, and asks to learn about the special secrets that every city is said to hold. A chance meeting with Imtiaz Saheb's daughter Emaan, a teacher at a school for special needs children, sets up a chain of events that lead to their marriage. Shahryar's father (Nadeem) and mother (Ismat Zaidi) are reluctant witnesses to the event, leaving immediately after the Nikkah and disowning their son while outright rejecting any connection with Emaan whom they consider an unwelcome usurper of their own choice, Sajal.

== Cast ==
- Faysal Qureshi as Shehreyar
- Naveen Waqar as Emaan
- Iqra Aziz as Sajjal
- Nadeem Baig as Humayun
- Ismat Zaidi as Shehreyar's mother
- Adnan Jaffar as Rohail Hayat
- Zainab Qayyum as Sanober (Rohail's wife)
- Rahma Ali as Sonia
- Minal Khan as Ghazia
- Munawar Saeed as Imtiaz
- Fariya Hassan as Sonia

== Awards ==
| Year | Award | Category | Recipient(s) and nominee(s) | Result |
|---|---|---|---|---|
| 2016 | Lux Style Awards | Best Original Soundtrack | Bushra Bilal | Nominated |
