= Yasir Jaswal =

Pakistani singer, film and music director (born 1983)

- Born: 11 March 1983 (age 43); Lahore, Punjab, Pakistan
- Other names: Yasir M Jaswal
- Occupations: Film and music director, writer, singer, photographer
- Known for: Irtaash (band) (lead vocalist)
- Notable work: Jalaibee (2015 film)
- Relatives: Umair Jaswal (brother); Uzair Jaswal (brother)

Yasir M Jaswal (Urdu: یاسر جسوال) is a Pakistani singer, writer, filmmaker, and award-winning music director.

He was the lead singer for his band Irtaash. He was also the lead vocalist for the band Call. He directed several award-winning music videos, and in 2015, he made his feature film debut with Jalaibee. His younger brothers Umair and Uzair Jaswal are also singers and actors. He won Lux Style Award in 2014 for directing music video of Uzair's single Bolay. He also won the Best Music Video Director award at the Hum Award in 2016 for the song Sajna by his brother Uzair Jaswal. His most recent venture has been a burger joint in Islamabad by the name of Jessie's which he has opened along with his brothers and friend.

== Early life ==
Yasir Jaswal was born on 11 March 1983 in Lahore, Punjab to a Punjabi Jaswal family, and currently lives in Islamabad.

== Career ==
=== Music career ===
Yasir Jaswal started his career as a musician in around 2003, later he joined the Islamabad-based rock band Irtaash. The band was founded in November 2001 and released its first album Kala Safaid Aasman consisting of eleven rock songs in May 2011, produced by Sarmad Abdul Ghafoor at the SnM Studios. He left the band in October 2011.

In August 2012, Yasir released his first solo song Khizaan, which he produced along with Ghafoor and recorded at the SnM Studios in Islamabad.

After leaving Irtaash, he joined Zulfiqar Jabbar Khan's band Call as a lead vocalist in June 2013, a year after the former lead vocalist Junaid Khan left the band. Before that, Jaswal and Zulfiqar, known as Xulfi had already worked together once in the band Entity Paradigm.

In 2013, he wrote and composed his younger brother Uzair Jaswal's single Bolay.

=== Directing career ===
Jaswal founded a music and film production company, Jaswal Films, and has directed several music videos, especially for Uzair.

In May 2010, Jaswal directed Uzair Jaswal's Mother's Day special song Maa, produced by Khurram Waqar at MindWorks Media. In November 2010, he directed Uzair's song Tere Bin.

In December 2011, Jaswal directed Shaheryar Mirza's Aakhri Baar for which he was nominated for the 2014 Lux Style Award for Best Music Video Director.

In June 2012, Yasir directed a music video of Zoraiz Riaz's song Janay Anjanay (Chupke Se Aye). In August 2012, he directed a music video of Omer Nadeem's single Kin Raaston Pe.

In 2013, Yasir directed Uzair's single Bolay, for which he won 2014 Lux Style Award for Best Music Video Director. He was also nominated for the 2014 Hum Award for Best Music Video.

In June 2014, Farhan Saeed's single Roiyaan was released, and the video was directed by Jaswal, for which he was nominated for the 2015 Hum Award for Best Music Video. He is also nominated for the upcoming 2015 Lux Style Award for Best Music Video Director.

Jaswal made his feature film directorial debut with the action crime Jalaibee based on his own script, starring Danish Taimoor, Ali Safina, Uzair Jaswal, and Wiqar Ali Khan. He shot the film with Arri Alexa HD, marking it the first Pakistani film shot with the camera. The film was released domestically and in a few other countries on 20 March 2015 by ARY Films. It grossed ₨10.5 crore with a budget of ₨10 crore.

In 2015, Yasir directed Uzair's music video of song Sajna, which featured Uzair, Armeena Khan, and Osman Khalid Butt. The video was set in the 1980s.

== Personal life ==
Yasir Jaswal is the elder brother of Umair Jaswal, who is also a singer, actor and lead vocalist of the band Qayaas, and Uzair Jaswal, also a singer, music composer and actor. Yasir is married, his wife is Saba Yasir Jaswal and he has 2 sons.

Yasir owns a classic 1973 Ford Mustang.

They live in Islamabad and Lahore.

== Discography ==
=== Albums ===
- Kala Safaid Aasman (2011)

=== Singles ===
- Khizaan (2012)

=== As writer or composer ===
- Bolay (2013)

== Filmography ==
=== Film ===
- Jalaibee (2015) – Director, writer

=== Velo Sound Station ===
- Yasir Jaswal Velo Sound Station Season 2

Music Producers & Program Director.

=== Music videos as director ===
- Maa (2010)
- Tere Bin (2010)
- Aakhri Baar (2011)
- Janay Anjanay (Chupke Se Aye) (2012)
- Kin Raaston Pe (2012)
- Bolay (2013)
- Roiyaan (2014)
- Sajna (2015)
- Sajni - Strings (2018)
- Na Rahoon - Umair Jaswal (2018)
- Jo Tu Na Mila - Asim Azhar (2018)
- Raat Shabnami - Strings (2019)

== Awards and nominations ==
Year	Award	Recipient	Category	Result
2014	13th Lux Style Awards	"Aakhri Baar"	Best Music Video Director	Nominated
2014	13th Lux Style Awards	"Bolay"	Best Music Video Director	Won
2014	2nd Hum Awards	"Bolay"	Best Music Video	Nominated
2015	3rd Hum Awards	"Roiyaan"	Best Music Video	Nominated
2015	14th Lux Style Awards	"Roiyaan"	Best Music Video Director	Nominated
