= Fashion Pakistan Week =

Pakistan Fashion Week (ہفتہ مُد پاکستان) is a fashion event annually held in Karachi, Pakistan. The event is organised by the Fashion Pakistan Council (FPC) an organisation based in Karachi. The FPW was first launched in 2009 in Marriott Hotels, Karachi.

The fashion industry in Pakistan had remained shy for cultural reasons. The event aims to present a vision of Pakistan that contrasts with its image of religious and political conflict, despite the domestic fashion industry often differing from the conservative dress codes expected in public spaces.

The first edition was organized in 2009, and was delayed twice for security issues.

== 2012 ==
FPW's fourth edition was held in September 2012 in Karachi. The event was held for three days with a great showings of fashion designers from all around the Pakistan.

== 2013 ==
FPW 5 was scheduled to be held on March 20–22, 2013, a three days event will present thirty designers from all over the Pakistan. But due to the Abbas Town tragedy, FPC's CEO and a designer Maheen Khan postponed to April 2013. The 3-day event was held on April 9, 2013. Fashion Pakistan Week 2017 featured Khas Stores, Emran Rajput, Baani D and Maheen Khan on the first day.

== 2014 ==
FPW Autumn/Winter 2014 was held from November 25–27 in Karachi. Mohsin Ali, Nauman Arfeenshowing, Ather Ali Hafeez for Sana Safinaz, Ishtiaq Afzal Khan's "Aurora," Nida Azwer, Shehla Chatoor, Deepak and Fahad, Ayesha Farooq Hashwani, Maheen Karim, Maheen Khan, Levi's, Sadaf Malaterre, and Faraz Mannan were among those showing at the event.
