= Amir Adnan =

Pakistani fashion designer

- Born: Karachi, Pakistan
- Education: Institute of Business Administration (BBA)
- Occupation: Fashion designer
- Years active: 1990–present
- Label: House of Amir Adnan
- Spouse: Huma Adnan
- Awards: Pride of Performance (2006); Lux Style Award – Best Menswear Designer (2016)

Amir Adnan is a Pakistani fashion designer who is credited with modernising the traditional sherwani. He is the founder of an eponymous menswear label.

== Early life and education ==
Adnan was born in Karachi. He studied business at the Institute of Business Administration, graduating in 1987. While employed as a banker in the late 1980s, he designed ties for colleagues; demand for the accessories soon persuaded him to leave finance and pursue fashion full-time.

== Career ==
Adnan formally founded his label in 1990. He has presented collections at every major national fashion week; his noir-themed line "The Way Forward" opened Fashion Pakistan Week Winter/Festive 2016.

== Personal life ==
Adnan is married to designer Huma Adnan, founder of FnkAsia and Craft Stories. His daughter, Parishae Adnan, leads the House of Amir Adnan as chief executive of Shapar Private Limited.

== Awards and honours ==
Adnan received the Pride of Performance from the President of Pakistan on 23 March 2006 for his contributions to fashion design.
