= Uzma Alkarim =

Pakistani news anchor

Uzma Alkarim is a female Pakistani news anchor, program host, and senior producer. She was an early news anchor on Geo News when Geo TV was launched. As a senior anchor and senior producer, she interviews numerous persons.

Alkarim specializes in research-based programs, surveys, shows, and transmission issues for the entire Geo group, including Geo News, Geotainment, Geo Entertainment, and Tezz.

Alkarim, interviewed by BBC, narrated that she and her husband was victim of Street Crime in Pakistan. Alkarim always advocated for Women's rights in Pakistan. Alkarim, a member of the Ismaili community, has also been an active voice against Islamic militancy in Pakistan.

In 2019 to 2020, Alkarim lead a gender sensitivity discussion.

Alkarim, in an interview with Pakistani leading newspaper DAWN, said that the media has been in crisis and that Social media changed the role of existing media.
