= Naveen Waqar =

Pakistani actress and presenter (born 1986)

- Born: Naveen Waqar Haider; 9 January 1985 (age 41); Karachi, Sindh, Pakistan
- Occupations: Actress, video jockey, radio jockey
- Years active: 2007 – present
- Known for: Humsafar, Annie Ki Ayegi Baraat, Saya-e-Dewar Bhi Nahi
- Spouse: Azfar Ali (m. 2012; div. 2015)
- Relatives: Faraz Haider (brother)

Naveen Waqar (Urdu: نوین وقار) (born 9 January 1985) is a Pakistani television actress and former video and radio jockey. She made her acting debut playing the antagonist Sara in 2012 series Humsafar. Her television appearances include a series of acclaimed projects including Annie Ki Ayegi Baraat, Alvida, Mol, Saya-e-Dewar Bhi Nahi, Kuch Na Kaho, Be Inteha, Tajdeed e Wafa and Mah-e-Tamaam. She made her film debut in 2013 with social-drama film Josh: Independence Through Unity, which was a critical and commercial success.

== Personal life ==
She married actor Azfar Ali in 2012; the couple divorced in November 2015.

== Career ==
Waqar started her career as VJ Fuse which was an instant success and landed as the parallel lead in all-time blockbuster Humsafar opposite Mahira Khan and Fawad Khan. Waqar's next venture was Geo TV's hit Annie Ki Ayegi Baraat. Waqar is known for her serious acting skills, and has established a career in Pakistani television industry. After her marriage to Azfar Ali, Waqar went on hiatus and returned with the sitcom Uff Meri Family, co-starring Ali, which debuted in May 2014.

She appeared in Amna Mufti's written 2015 series Mol opposite Faysal Quraishi. Her performance, as a confident and level-headed person in the series was praised by critics. In 2016, Waqar portrayed Shehla in the social-drama Saya-e-Dewar Bhi Nahi, the female lead who endures hardships and navigates love and personal freedom. According to Waqar, the role challenged her and fueled her career's growth.

In 2020–21, Waqar played Mahnoor in the horror-drama Chalawa.

== Filmography ==
=== Films ===
Year	Title	Role	Notes	Ref(s)
2013	Josh	Iqra		
2015	Orphic		Short film	
2022	Carma	Maria Shah	Feature Film	

=== Television ===
Year	Title	Role	Network	Notes	Ref(s)
2011	Humsafar	Sara	Hum TV	Pakistan Media Awards for Best New Female Actor, Hum Honorary Phenomenal Serial Award	
2012	Annie Ki Ayegi Baraat	Annie			
2014	Uff Meri Family	Ujala			
2015	Alvida	Uroosa			
2015	Mol	Emaan		Nominated-Hum Award for Best Actress	
2016	Saya-e-Dewar Bhi Nahi	Shehla			
2016	Kuch Na Kaho	Ayna			
2017	Be Inteha	Bisma			
2017	Dukh Sukh	Maya		Episode "Musafir"	
2018	Mah-e-Tamaam	Samahir			
2018	Tajdeed e Wafa	Neha			
2019	Bewafa	Kinza			
2020	Chalawa	Mahnoor			
2022	Paristan	Mehreen	Hum TV		
2023	Dagh E Dil	Almas			
2023	101 Talaqain	Reha	Green Entertainment		
2023	Siyaah	Maya	Green Entertainment	Episode: Nangay Pair	
2025	Case No. 9	Manisha	Geo Entertainment		
