= Jahan-e-Khalid =

Pakistani super model and educationist

- Born: 24 April 1986 (age 40); Lahore, Punjab, Pakistan
- Education: Bachelor's in ACCA
- Alma mater: Aitchison College
- Occupation: Model
- Years active: 2009–present
- Height: 191 cm (6 ft 3 in)

Jahan-e-Khalid is Pakistani super model, educationist and entrepreneur. Having worked with top brands and fashion designers he has established himself as a leading model and has been nominated twice as Best Model Male at Lux Style Awards. He received three consecutive nominations at Hum Awards as Best Model Male, winning one.

== Career ==
Khalid was born on April 24, 1986, in Lahore. He attended Aitchison College and completed his bachelor's degree in Association of Chartered Certified Accountants (ACCA) in 2010 and worked for two years before entering the fashion industry. Besides modeling he helped his father's construction business.

In 2009 while working at call center he did a photoshoot with his friend, who wanted to be professional photographer, he recalled "The portfolio turned out really well and he sent those out to different designers. We became a team. We supported each other. In the time span of 6 months, he found Tariq Amin (the awesome hair and makeup artist of Pakistan) and he introduced me to him. From there my journey began." In 2012 he officially joined the industry and modeled for Republic by Omar Farooq and since then worked with HSY, Deepak Perwani, Emraan Rajput and many others. He regularly appears in Pakistan Fashion Design Council's fashion weeks, events and seminars.

== Awards and nominations ==
Year	Award	Category	Result	Ref.
2014	13th Lux Style Awards	Best Model - Male	Nominated	
2014	4th Pakistan Media Awards	Best Model Male	Nominated	
2014	2nd Hum Awards	Best Model - Male	Won	
2015	14th Lux Style Awards	Best Model - Male	Nominated	
2015	3rd Hum Awards	Best Model - Male	Won	
2015	4th Hum Awards	Best Model - Male	Nominated	
