= Begum Gul Bakaoli Sarfarosh =

Studio album by Noori
- Released: October 9, 2015
- Recorded: 2014–2015 at BIY Studios in Lahore, Pakistan
- Genre: Pop rock Alternative rock
- Length: 44:33
- Label: BIY Records
- Producer: Noori, Shiraz Uppal, Hassan Omer

Noori chronology
Peeli Patti Aur Raja Jani Ki Gol Dunya (2005)	Begum Gul Bakaoli Sarfarosh (2015)

Singles from Begum Gul Bakaoli Sarfarosh
- 1. "Aik Tha Badshah" Released: June 16, 2015; 2. "Pinjra" Released: December 23, 2017

Begum Gul Bakaoli Sarfarosh (Urdu: بیگم گل بکاولی سرفروش) is the third studio album released by the Pakistani rock band Noori. The album was released on 9 October 2015 through a three-day album launch tour in the cities of Lahore, Karachi, and Islamabad (respectively). The album was released in Peshawar on 22 November 2015 where Noori performed for its promotion. Additionally, the album was made available through music streaming service Patari.pk as a free Patari exclusive. The album was preceded by a music video for "Aik tha Badshah" using a more electronica-influenced mix than the version eventually used on the album.

== Track listing ==
All songs composed by Ali Noor, except where noted.

Begum Gul Bakaoli Sarfarosh
No.	Title	Writer(s)	Length
1.	"1947"	Ali Noor	6:02
2.	"Hoshiyar"	Ali Hamza	3:51
3.	"Pinjra"	Ali Noor	4:23
4.	"Hey Ya"	Ali Hamza	5:05
5.	"Kedaar"	Ali Hamza	4:59
6.	"Aik Tha Badshah"	Ali Hamza	5:44
7.	"Sarfarosh"	Ali Noor	5:06
8.	"Mujhay Roko"	Ali Noor	4:42
9.	"Saya-e-Khuda-e-Zuljalal"	Hafeez Jalandhri, Ali Hamza	4:41

== Personnel ==
All information is taken from the CD.

Noori

- Ali Noor: lead vocals, lead guitar, synth programming
- Ali Hamza: bass, lead vocals

Additional musicians

- Kami Paul: drums
- Hassan Omer: co-producer, additional synth and drums programming
- Shiraz Uppal: Mastering and mixing
