= PFDC Fashion Week =

Annual Pakistani fashion faire

PFDC Fashion Week is an annual fashion week held in Lahore and Karachi in Pakistan. The event is organised by the Pakistan Fashion Design Council (PFDC) along with the sponsor of Sunsilk.

== 2010 ==
1st PFDC Sunsilk Fashion Week was held on February 16–19, 2010 in Lahore.

== 2011 ==
3rd PFDC Sunsilk Fashion Week was held in 2011 in Lahore and Karachi.

== 2012 ==
5th PFDC Sunsilk Fashion Week was held in April 2012. The venue for the event was Expo Centre Lahore.

== 2017 ==
The 9th PFDC Sunsilk Fashion Week was held in March 2017. This four-day event was held in Lahore and showcased top Pakistani fashion designers. In addition to this, at least four new designers were also launched in collaboration with Bank Al Falah Rising Talent Segment.
