= Thora Sa Haq =

Pakistani romantic dram serial

- تھوڑا سا حق
- Genre: Drama; Romance
- Written by: Adeel Razzaq
- Directed by: Ahmed Bhatti
- Starring: Imran Abbas; Ayeza Khan
- Country of origin: Pakistan
- Original language: Urdu
- No. of episodes: 32

Production
- Producer: Abdullah Seja
- Running time: 38 minutes
- Production company: iDream Entertainment

Original release
- Network: ARY Digital
- Release: 23 October 2019 – 10 June 2020

Thora Sa Haq (Urdu: تھوڑا سا حق, lit. 'A bit of right') is a 2019 Pakistani romantic drama television series that premiered on ARY Digital on 23 October 2019. It is produced by Abdullah Seja under their banner Idream Entertainment. Ayeza Khan and Imran Abbas play the leading roles in their fourth on-screen appearance after Tum Kon Piya (2016), Mohabbat Tumse Nafrat Hai (2017) and Koi Chand Rakh (2018). It is digitally available on YouTube and in some countries on VIU App.

== Plot ==
Seher is a beautiful and simple girl who lives in Hyderabad with her father. She is getting married because of her father's ailing health.

Zamin and Hareem are two cousins who live in the same house and love each other dearly. They have been engaged. Aijaz (Seher's father) was thrown out of the house after he refused to marry Rabia's sister. However Waqar keeps contact with him and goes to Seher's marriage where they get to know that the groom has run away. Aijaz gets a heart attack and then pleads to his brother. Waqar tells him not to worry as Zamin will marry Seher. Their marriage was done forcefully. After hearing the vows, Aijaz dies. Waqar takes Seher to his own house where she is ill-treated by Rabia due to what her father did years ago. Zamin and Seher keep their nikkah secret and story takes a new turn when Hareem learns of their marriage. In the end, Seher is pregnant.

== Cast ==
- Ayeza Khan as Seher Zamin Ahmad
- Imran Abbas Naqvi as Zamin Ahmad
- Mashal Khan as Hareem Iftikhar
- Saba Faisal as Rabia Begum, Hareem's mother
- Behroze Sabzwari as Waqar Ahmed
- Firdous Jamal as Iftikhar Ahmed, Hareem's father
- Nida Mumtaz as Munazzah, Zamin's mother
- Hina Sheikh as Shamsa Khala, Seher's neighbour
- Saba Zahid as Zobia, Shamsa's daughter
- Shan Baig as Rafay, Hareem's maternal cousin
- Saira Ghaffar as Farzana
- Mehmood Akhter as Aijaz Ahmed, Seher's father

== Nominations ==
Year	Awards	Category	Recipient	Result
February 7, 2020	PISA 2020	Best Television Actor	Imran Abbas	Nominated
