= Imran Abbas =

Pakistani actor and model (born 1982)

Imran Abbas Naqvi
- عمران عباس
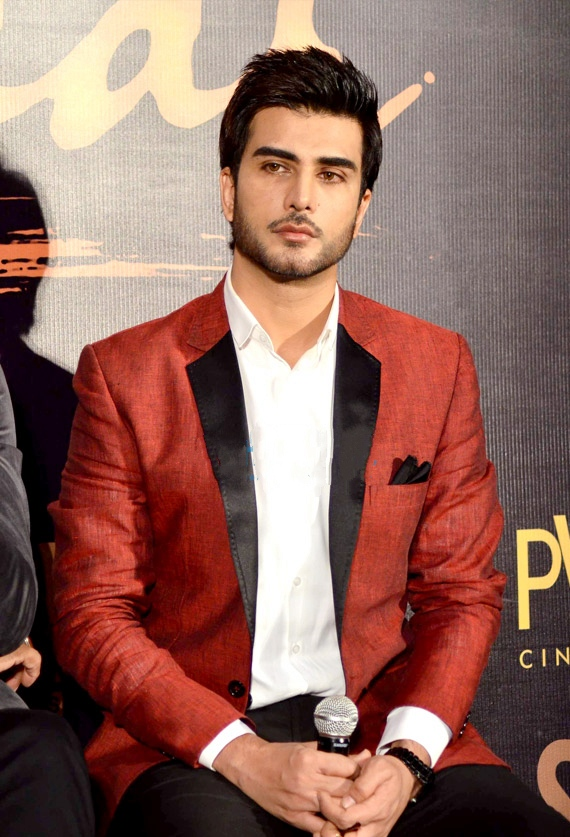
- Abbas at Jaanisaar trailer launch in 2015
- Pronunciation: [səjːəd̪ ɪmɾɑːn əbːɑːs nəqʋiː]
- Born: Syed Imran Abbas Naqvi; 15 October 1982 (age 43); Islamabad, Pakistan
- Education: National College of Arts
- Occupations: Actor; Model; Singer
- Years active: 2003–present
- Height: 1.83 m (6 ft 0 in)
- Website: imranabbas.com

Syed Imran Abbas Naqvi (Note: Urdu pronunciation: [səjːəd̪ ɪmɾɑːn əbːɑːs nəqʋiː].) (Urdu pronunciation: [səjːəd̪ ɪmɾɑːn əbːɑːs nəqʋiː]; born 15 October 1982) professionally known by his stage name Imran Abbas, is a Pakistani actor, model and producer who works predominantly in Urdu television and films.

Abbas made his acting debut with Umrao Jaan Ada in 2003 and later on appeared in numerous serials. He got widely recognized after portraying Hammad Raza in the 2011 spiritual-romantic series Khuda Aur Mohabbat, which proved to be a turning point in his career.

Abbas is best known for his roles Adeel in Dil-e-Muztar (2013) for which he received a nomination for Best actor popular in Hum Awards and Hadi Salman in Alvida (2015) which earned him Best on-screen couple with Sanam Jung. His other notable works include Akbari Asghari (2011), Mera Naam Yousuf Hai (2015), Tum Kon Piya (2016), Mohabbat Tumse Nafrat Hai (2017) and Koi Chand Rakh (2018).

In 2014, Abbas made his Bollywood debut in Vikram Bhatt's horror thriller Creature 3D opposite Bipasha Basu and later appeared on Jaanisaar.

== Early life and education ==
Abbas was born on 15 October 1982 in Islamabad. His family roots lie in Uttar Pradesh, India from where his family moved following the 1947 partition. The youngest of six siblings, with two elder brothers and three elder sisters, his father worked as a civil engineer in a government job, and he grew up in an artistic household, himself painting since the age of 4 as well being a singer and writing Urdu poetry. Among the regular visitors to his house were famed Urdu poets Parveen Shakir and Ahmad Faraz.

He studied architecture at the National College of Arts, Lahore because he found it was a blend of art and engineering. Before entering NCA he also trained in classical music.

== Career ==
=== Pakistan ===
He began his career at the age of 20, working as a model. He made his first television appearance in Umrao Jaan Ada (2003) and later appeared in numerous dramas, telefilms, soaps and films.

In 2010, Abbas acted in Mujhe Hai Hukum-e-Azan, which marked his debut in production as well.

=== India ===
In 2014, he made his debut in Bollywood opposite Bipasha Basu in Vikram Bhatt's Creature 3D, for which he was nominated at Filmfare Award for Best Male Debut category. In 2015, Abbas featured in Jaanisaar directed by Muzaffar Ali alongside Pernia Qureshi.

== Filmography ==
=== Films ===
- All films are in Urdu language, unless otherwise noted.

Year	Film	Role	Country	Notes
2013	Anjuman	Asif Ali	Pakistan	Debut film
2014	Creature 3D	Karan Malhotra /Kunal Anand	India	Hindi film
2015	Jaanisaar	Prince Amir Haydar	India	Hindi film
2016	Ae Dil Hai Mushkil	Dr. Faisal Khan	India	Hindi film; Guest appearance
2016	Abdullah: The Final Witness	Abdullah	Pakistan	
2018	Azad	Faris	Pakistan	Special appearance
2024	Jee Ve Sohneya Jee	Ali Pervaiz	India	Punjabi film

=== Television ===
==== Drama series ====
Year	Show	Role	Network	Ref
2003	Umrao Jaan Ada	Nawab Sultan	Geo Entertainment	TV debut
2006	Koi Lamha Gulab Ho	Shahryar	Hum TV	
2006	Piya Ke Ghar Jana Hai	Amaan	ARY Digital / Star Plus	
2007	Sarkar Sahab	Balaaj	ARY Digital	
2007	Man-O-Salwa	Jamal	Hum TV	
2007	Wilco	Asim	PTV Home	
2008	Sun Leyna	Maqsood	ARY Digital	
2008	Abhi Abhi	Bilal Baig	ARY Digital	
2008	Woh Rishtey Woh Natey	Asad	Geo Entertainment	
2009	Malaal	Jawad Ibrahim	Hum TV	
2009	Mujhe Apna Bana Lo	Azaan Ahmed	Hum TV	
2009	Meri Zaat Zarra-e-Benishan	Haydar Abbas	Geo Entertainment	
2010	Mujhe Hai Hukum-e-Azaan	Fahad Abdullah	Hum TV	
2010	Noor Bano	Agha Murash	Hum TV	
2010	Mera Naseeb	Moeez Hayat	Hum TV	
2011	Khuda Aur Muhabbat	Hammad Raza	Geo Entertainment	
2011	Akbari Asghari	Akbar	Hum TV	
2012	Teri Meri Dosti	Rafay	Hum TV	
2013	Dil e Muztar	Adeel	Hum TV	
2015	Alvidaa	Hadi Salman "HS"	Hum TV	
2015	Aitraaz	Wajdaan	ARY Digital	
2015	Mera Naam Yousuf Hai	Yousuf Ahmed	A-Plus Entertainment	
2016	Tum Kon Piya	Ramish Hasan	Urdu 1	
2016	Khuda Aur Muhabbat 2	Hammad Raza	Geo Entertainment	
2017	Mohabbat Tumse Nafrat Hai	Waqar Ahmed	Geo Entertainment	
2017	Yaar-e-Bewafa	Zayd Ahmed	Geo Entertainment	
2018	Noor ul Ain	Khizar	ARY Digital	
2018	Koi Chand Rakh	Zayn Abrar	ARY Digital	
2019	Darr Khuda Say	Shahvez	Geo Entertainment	
2020	Jo Tu Chahey	Hashir Abbas	Hum TV	
2020	Thora Sa Haq	Zamin Ahmed	ARY Digital	
2021	Amanat	Zarrar	ARY Digital	
2023	Ehraam-e-Junoon	Shayan "Shaani"	Geo Entertainment	
2023	Tumhare Husn Ke Naam	Sikandar	Green Entertainment	
2024	Dil Ka Kya Karein	Aryan Khan	Green Entertainment	
2024	Mehshar	Mir Abdur Rahman	Geo Entertainment	

===== Guest =====
Year	Drama	Role
2009	Azar Ki Ayegi Baraat	Himself
2010	Vasl	Nabeel
2012	Main Manto	Talochan Singh

==== Telefilms ====
Year	Title	Role
2005	A Love Story	Shahryar
2006	Chook	Salman
2006	Kyun Pyaar Nahi Milta	Sunny
2007	Tum Kahan Mai Kahan	Zayn
2008	Sheer Khurma	Ali
2008	Abdullah	Abdullah
2009	Dil Deewana	Ayan
2010	Shadi Aur Tum Say?	Sami
2011	Dekh Kabira Roya	Kabir
2012	Raati Masha Tola	Jamaal
2016	Musafir	Sikandar
2021	Chahat	Tanveer
2023	I Love You Zara	Zayn

==== Other appearances ====
Year	Reality Show	Role	Guest/Host With
2012	17th PTV Awards	Host	Hosted with Saba Qamar
2014	Big Star Entertainment Awards	Host	Hosted with Sunil Grover
2014	Comedy Nights with Kapil	Guest	To promote Creature 3D with Bipasha Basu
2015	Tonite with HSY	Guest	With Sanam Jung
2015	Subh-e-Pakistan	Guest	Aired on Geo TV
2015	Good Morning Zindagi	Guest	To promote Mera Naam Yousuf Hai with Maya Ali
2015	Jago Pakistan Jago	Guest	To promote Alvidaa
2015	Ramzan Kareem	Guest	Ramzan special aired on ATV
2016	Raat Chali Hai Jhoom Ke	Host	Hosted a Musical Programme
2016	Mehmaan Nawaaz	Host	Eid special (later hosted by Ayeza Khan)
2017	Eid Show with Imran Abbas and Saba Qamar	Host	For Dunya News (hosted with Saba Qamar)
2017	Good Morning Pakistan by Nida Yasir	Guest	Eid special with Kubra Khan, Sadia Khan, Hira Tareen, Sumbul Iqbal, Momal Sheikh
2017	Good Morning Pakistan by Nida Yasir	Guest	Kon banegi Imran Abbas ki Dulhania
2017	Mazaaq Raat	Guest	With Fizi Khan
2018	Jago Pakistan Jago	Guest	New Year Special
2018	The After Moon Show	Guest	Guest with Reema Khan
2018	Good Morning Pakistan by Nida Yasir	Guest	To promote Noor ul Ain
2018	Ehed-e-Ramzan	Host	Ramzan special, aired on Express Entertainment
2019	Ehed-e-Ramzan	Host	Ramzan special, aired on Express Entertainment
2019	Speak Your Heart With Samina Peerzada	Guest	Season 2 Episode 24
2019	Bol Nights with Ahsan Khan	Guest	With Reema Khan
2020	Good Morning Pakistan with Nida Yasir	Guest	To promote drama serial Thora Sa Haq with Ayeza Khan
2020	Conversations with Sonia Rehman	Guest	
2021	Baran e Rehmat - Ramzan Transmission	Host	Transmission in Istanbul, Turkey. Hosted Diriliş: Ertuğrul cast and some famous Turkish actors.

== Discography ==
Year	Song	Vocalists	Album/Movie
2015	Sher Dil Shaheen	Rahat Fateh Ali Khan	Sher Dil Shaheen
2015	Tu Mera Nahi	Himself	Mera Naam Yousuf Hai
2016	Khuda Aur Mohabbat	Himself	Khuda Aur Muhabbat
2017	Peyam Aaye Hain	Himself	Yaar-e-Bewafa
2018	Allah Hu Allah Hu	Alongside Aima Baig	Ehed-e-Ramzan
2020	Soniye	Himself	Kashmir Beats
2021	Qaseeda Burda Shareef	Himself	Qaseeda Burda Shareef
2024	Gul Azro Khata	Himself	Gul Azro Khata

== Awards and nominations ==
Year	Award	Category	Work	Result	Ref
2004	3rd Lux Style Awards	Best Model of the Year (Male)	—N/a	Nominated	
2014	2nd Hum Awards	Best Actor Popular	Dil-e-Muztar	Nominated	
2014	2nd Hum Awards	Best Actor	Dil-e-Muztar	Nominated	
2014	2nd Hum Awards	[[Hum Award for Best Onscreen Couple Popular|Best On-screen Couple Popular]] with Sanam Jung	Dil-e-Muztar	Nominated	
2014	2nd Hum Awards	Best On-screen Couple with Sanam Jung	Dil-e-Muztar	Nominated	
2015	Filmfare Awards	Best Male Debut	Creature 3D	Nominated	
2016	4th Hum Awards	Best On-screen Couple Popular with Sanam Jung	Alvida	Won	
2016	4th Hum Awards	Best On-screen Couple with Sanam Jung	Alvida	Won	
2016	4th Hum Awards	Best Actor	Alvida	Nominated	
2017	17th Lux Style Awards	Best TV Actor	Khuda Aur Mohabbat 2	Nominated	

== See also ==
- Ayeza Khan - Worked together in Tum Kon Piya, Mohabbat Tumse Nafrat Hai, Koi Chand Rakh, Dekh Kabira Roya (telefilm), Thora Sa Haq
- Ayesha Khan - Worked together in Mujhe Apna Bana Lo, Abdullah (telefilm), Man-O-Salwa
- Fawad Khan - Worked together in Akbari Asghari, Ae Dil Hai Mushkil
- Sanam Jung - Worked together in Dil-e-Muztar, Alvidaa
