= Mehar Posh =

Pakistani romantic drama serial

- Official title card
- Genre: Romantic drama
- Written by: Misbah Nausheen
- Directed by: Mazhar Moin
- Starring: Ayeza Khan; Danish Taimoor
- Opening theme: "Tu Ki Jaane" by Sahir Ali Bagga
- Ending theme: "O Bereham" by Sahir Ali Bagga
- Composer: Sahir Ali Bhagga
- Country of origin: Pakistan
- Original language: Urdu
- No. of episodes: 41

Production
- Producers: Abdullah Kadwani; Asad Qureshi
- Running time: 35-40 minutes
- Production company: 7th Sky Entertainment

Original release
- Network: Geo Entertainment
- Release: 3 April 2020 – 8 January 2021

Mehar Posh (Urdu: مہرپوش, lit. 'Sealed') is a 2020 Pakistani romantic drama serial that aired from 3 April 2020 to 8 January 2021 on Geo Entertainment. It was directed by Mazhar Moin, and produced by Abdullah Kadwani and Asad Qureshi under 7th Sky Entertainment. It stars Ayeza Khan and Danish Taimoor in their seventh project together. The supporting cast includes Ali Abbas, Sania Saeed, Rehan Sheikh, Ismat Zaidi, and Iffat Rahim. Despite a typical love story, its first episode was regarded as the highest rated first episode of any Pakistani series.

It is digitally available to stream on YouTube and in some countries on VIU App. The Show was also aired on Star Plus UAE.

It opened with 14.9 TRP on opening day, which is highest opening TRP to date. The second episode achieved TRP of 12.9, third episode got TRP of 14.6 while fourth episode got TRP of 11.7. During on air, it was among the top five most watched dramas weekly. The drama ended with 8.7 TRP on last episode.

== Plot ==
Mehr-un-Nisa aka Mehru is a simple and kind-hearted girl from a middle-class family. Shah Jahan is Mehru's next-door neighbour who has always been respectful of her and her family. In an unfortunate turn of events, on Mehru's wedding day, Shahjahan and his friends casually pass flirtatious remarks for Mehru and joke around. Her husband, Naeem, hears their conversation about Mehru and threatens to divorce her because of the malicious intentions of her in-laws. Naeem's aunt, Shakeela, has always been jealous of Naeem's mother, Sakeena, and her family. She tricks Naeem into thinking that Mehru reciprocates feelings for the group of friends. Naeem, furious over what he has heard and guided by the cruel motives of his aunt, divorces Mehru on the first night of their marriage (the wedding night). Mehru tries to tell Naeem that she does not know what he is talking about, nor has she ever had feelings for anyone. Naeem refuses to listen to her and insults her character. Naeem's mother blames him for listening to his aunt and tells him that Mehru is an innocent girl. However, Naeem does not listen and tells his mother to drop Mehru off at her home. The next morning, Naeem's mother apologizes to Mehru and drops her off. Mehru reveals her divorce to her family, which leaves them heartbroken. Due to this, Mehru and Ayat's father die. Shahjahan also learns of Mehru's divorce and learns that Naeem had listened to the flirtatious comments that he and his friends had jokingly passed for her.

Shahjahan feels guilty and blames himself for Mehru's condition. He begins to develop feelings for her. Eventually, Mehru reciprocates the feeling for him, unaware that Ayat (Mehru's sister) also has feelings for Shahjahan. When Ayat learns about Mehru and Shahjahan, she blackmails Mehru, saying that she will kill herself if she doesn't get Shahjahan. After which Mehru is heartbroken. Due to this, she tells Shahjahan to marry Ayat, who himself is confused. He tries his best to convince her but he fails. He was then under pressure because of his mom, and Mehru marries Ayat. After a few months, Mehru gets to know that Shahjahan and his friends were the people responsible for her marriage to break, after which she breaks all ties with Shahjahan and decides to move on and marry Rashid (Mehru's boss). Ayat, who was waiting for an opportunity, takes this situation as an advantage and tries to convince Shahjahan into believing that Mehru was always after money and she used him, but he doesn't believe her. Then, Ayat mixes poison in food she has made for Mehru. When Shahjahan sees the bottle of poison under the chair he runs to Mehru's house and tells Mehru that Ayat has mixed poison, in food. But Nusrat does not believe that her daughter can mix poison so she decides to eat that food, but Ayat stops her and says that Shahjahan is saying the truth. Then Shahjahan gets to a call and gets know about Ayat's accident. So, everybody came to the hospital and then Ayat asks Shahjahan to promise to always care for Mehru. After Ayat's death, Mehru is depressed. At the wedding, Rashid tells Mehru to marry Shahjahan. Mehru agrees and her and Shahjahan get happily married.

== Cast ==
- Ayeza Khan as Mehr-un-Nisa Shah Jahan (nee Jahanzaib) aka Mehru - Jahanzaib & Nusrat's daughter; Ayat's sister; Naeem's ex wife; Shah Jahan's wife.
- Danish Taimoor as Shah Jahan - Kaneez's son; Ayat's widower; Mehru's husband.
- Ali Abbas as Naeem - Mehru's ex husband.
- Zainab Shabir as Ayat Shah Jahan (nee Jahanzaib) - Jahanzaib & Nusrat's daughter; Mehru's sister; Shah Jahan's wife. (dead)
- Sania Saeed as Nusrat Jahanzaib - Jahanzaib's wife; Mehru & Ayat's mother.
- Rehan Sheikh as Jahanzaib - Nusrat's husband; Mehru & Ayat's father. (dead)
- Ismat Zaidi as Sakeena - Naeem's mother; Shakeela's sister.
- Iffat Rahim as Shakeela - Sakeena's sister; Naeem's aunt.
- Humaira Bano as Kaneez - Shah Jahan's mother.
- Arez Ahmed as Waqas
- Beena Chaudhary as Mehru's aunt.
- Mubsirah Khan as Almas
- Ayesha Gul as Aisha
- Seemi Pasha as herself
- Affan Waheed as Rashid - Mehru's boss & prospect groom.

== Production ==
On 12 March 2020, Khan revealed through Instagram about her upcoming project. The first teaser was released in March 2020. The fourth teaser revealed that the serial would release on 3 April 2020.

It is the seventh project featuring real life couple Khan and Taimoor together after Larkiyan Mohallay Ki (2010), Kitni Girhain Baaki hain (2012), Saari Bhool Hamari Thi (2013), Kahani Aik Raat Ki (2013), Shareek-e-Hayat (2014) and Jab We Wed (2014).

== Soundtrack ==
Mehar Posh

Soundtrack album by Sahir Ali Bagga
- Released: 28 March 2020
- Recorded: 2020
- Genre: Television soundtrack
- Length: 10:45
- Language: Urdu
- Label: Geo Entertainment

Music video
- "OST: Mehar Posh" on YouTube

The original soundtrack is sung and composed by Sahir Ali Bagga on his own lyrics.

=== Track listing ===
All lyrics are written by Sahir Ali Bagga; all music is composed by Sahir Ali Bagga.

No.	Title	Artist(s)	Length
1.	""Tu Ki Jaane""	Sahir Ali Bagga	7:01
2.	""O Bereham""	Sahir Ali Bagga	3:44

== Awards and nominations ==
Year	Awards	Category	Recipient	Result	Ref.
2021	Lux Style Awards	Best Female Actor - Viewer's choice	Ayeza Khan	Nominated	
