= Yaariyan (TV series) =

Pakistani television series

- یاریاں
- Written by: Samina Ijaz
- Directed by: Syed Wajahat Hussain & Moiz Abbas
- Starring: Ayeza Khan; Junaid Khan; Momal Sheikh; Muneeb Butt
- Theme music composer: Naveed Nashad
- Country of origin: Pakistan
- Original language: Urdu
- No. of episodes: 27

Production
- Producer: Erum bint-e-Shahid
- Editor: Shahbaz Ali Baloch
- Camera setup: Multi-camera setup
- Running time: approximately 40 minutes
- Production company: Dramaybaaz Entertainment

Original release
- Network: Geo Entertainment
- Release: 19 April – 4 October 2019

Yaariyan (Urdu: یاریاں, lit. 'Friendships') is a 2019 Pakistani drama television series, produced by Erum bint-e-Shahid under their production banner Dramaybaaz Entertainment and directed by Syed Wajahat Hussain & Moiz Abbas. It features Ayeza Khan, Muneeb Butt, Momal Sheikh and Junaid Khan in lead roles and Mehmood Aslam and Hina Khawaja Bayat in recurring roles.

== Plot ==
Sadia and Zobia are sisters raised with strict family values by their father Hamid. Sadia is married to Ahmer but her wedding (rukhsati) was on hold while the family waits for her uncle's return from America. Zobia, on the other hand, is having an affair with Umair.

When she invites Umair to Sadia's birthday to introduce him to her family, Sadia does not approve of the rich and spoilt Umair. As the meeting between Umair and both sisters is taking place – Hamid and Ahmer along with his family arrives at the party to surprise Sadia on her birthday. Ahmer misreads the situation completely and assumes that it is actually his wife who is interested in Umair. Zobia gets accidentally injured in the mishap and lands up in coma. Sadia tells everyone that Umair actually came to meet Zobia, but no one believes her. When Zobia wakes up from coma, Sadia begs her to tell the truth in front of Ahmer and her parents, but Zobia lies and claims Sadia is having an affair with Umair. In a fit of rage, Ahmer immediately divorces Sadia.

Sadia is shunned by Ahmer and her family. Sadia’s father goes to Umair’s house to tell his mother about how Umair has destroyed Sadia’s life and proposes a Nikah between the two. Umair’s mother agrees, despite Umair telling his mother that he loves Zobia. Umair, however, agrees to his mother’s demands when he overhears her talking about her cancer. Sadia and Umair are married. Sadia’s fathers breaks all ties with her and tells her to never come back. When Zobia hears about Umair and Sadia’s Nikah, she is left heartbroken.

Umair is rude to Sadia, while Umair’s mother is very kind to her. Both Umair and Sadia agree to stay married for his mother's sake. Later however, when Zobia shows up and confronts them, Umair immediately declares his love for Zobia. But, she angrily rebuffs him. Sadia tells Umair that she will not let him destroy Zobia’s life.

Despite his efforts, Zobia refuses to forgive Umair. Umair comes home drunk later that night and in a fit of rage, rapes Sadia. However, the next morning when Sadia confronts him, Umair claims Sadia is lying, despite not remembering anything. Zobia is not able to forget Umair and forgives him, eventually. Both of them continue meeting in secret.

Things take a turn when it's revealed Sadia is pregnant. Zobia is infuriated with Umair and breaks all ties with him. Umair refuses to accept that Sadia is pregnant with his child, he instead claims that Ahmer is the baby’s father. Ahmer began liking Zobia, after spending time with her and proposes marriage. Zobia accepts, as a means of revenge on Sadia. Umair is infuriated with the announcement of Zobia and Ahmer’s marriage. Despite his attempts to stop them, Ahmer and Zobia are married. Sadia keeps pleading to Umair that she is, in fact, pregnant with his child but Umair refuses to listen. When Umair’s mother also expresses doubts, Sadia is heartbroken and lands in the hospital. Umair is initially angry with her, but softens towards her. Umair apologises to his Mother and both of them apologise to Sadia. Umair tells Sadia to give him another chance. Sadia, happily, agrees.

A newly, married Zobia becomes jealous of Umair and Sadia’s relationship. She tries her best to make Umair jealous by spending time with Ahmer but Umair remains unaffected. After Zobia’s repeated attempts to seduce Umair, he clearly tells her that he wants a happy life with Sadia and she should concentrate on Ahmer, who loves her.

Zobia then decides to ruin Sadia’s reputation, once again, by making Umair believe that Ahmer and Sadia keep meeting each other and are in love. Umair begins to believe her and again refuses to accept the baby as his own. Zobia uses this to her advantage and accuses Ahmer of cheating on her.

All this is witnessed by Zobia and Sadia’s father, who is horrified, and asks Sadia for forgiveness. He later dies from a heart attack. Tired of all the accusations, Umair’s mother tells him to get a DNA test done to prove it, once and for all. Both Umair and his mother are left ashamed when the DNA test turns out to be positive.

Umair begs forgiveness from Sadia and her mother, but Sadia refuses to forgive him. Umair blames Zobia for spoiling his life. Umair’s mother eventually dies from cancer and Sadia forgives Umair. Zobia, finally, comes to realize that despite everything she did, Ahmer still loves her. She begs for forgiveness from Ahmer, who forgives her. It ends with both couples appearing to be happy.

== Cast ==
- Junaid Khan as Ahmer (protagonist)Zobia's husband
- Ayeza Khan as Zobia (antagonist)
- Muneeb Butt as Umair (protagonist)Sadia's husband.
- Momal Sheikh as Sadia (protagonist)
- Shagufta Ejaz as Zeenat(Sadia and Zobi's mother)
- Mehmood Aslam as Hamid (Zobia and Sadia's father) (antagonist) (Dead)
- Hina Khawaja Bayat as Aaliya (Dead) (Umair and Sumbul's mother)
- Mariyam Nafees as Sumbul (sadia's sister in law)
- Shaista Jabeen as Ahmer's mother
- Ahmed Zeb as Sumbul's husband

== Production ==
=== Casting ===
It marks the third on-screen appearance of Junaid, Muneeb and Momal after drama-serial Silsilay and Kadoorat, and second on-screen appearance of Muneeb Butt and Ayeza Khan as well after Koi Chand Rakh.

=== Title ===
The series was earlier titled Apne Se Ajnabi but the makers changed it to Yaariyan.

== Release ==
First teaser of Yaariyan was released on 15 April 2019, while the first episode was released on 19 April 2019 which received positive response from the audience.

Episode	Release date	Views (On Youtube)	Avg Trps	Description
1	19 April 2019	4.7 M		
2	26 April 2019	3.4M		
3	3 May 2019	2.9M		
4	3 May 2019	3.3M		
5	10 May 2019	4.2M		
6	17 May 2019	4.1M		
7	23 May 2019	4.3M		
8	31 May 2019	4.3M		
9	7 June 2019	4.7M		
10	14 June 2019	4.7M		

== Nominations ==
Year	Awards	Category	Recipient	Result
7 February 2020	PISA 2020	Best Television Actor	Muneeb Butt	Nominated
7 February 2020	PISA 2020	Best Television Actress	Momal Shaikh	Nominated
7 February 2020	PISA 2020	Best Original Soundtrack	Nabeel Shaukat Ali	Nominated
