= Mehmood Akhtar =

Pakistani actor

Mahmood Akhtar
- محمود اختر
- Born: Karachi, Pakistan
- Occupation: Actor
- Years active: 1969–present

Mehmood Akhtar is a Pakistani actor, director, screenwriter, poet and singer from Karachi. He appeared in many dramas and sitcoms.

== Early life and education ==
Akhtar was born and raised in Karachi, Pakistan and spent his childhood in Karachi near the Jubilee Cinema area, a hub of film culture in the city’s earlier days. During his youth he attended St. Patrick’s College, Karachi, where he completed a Bachelor of Commerce (B.Com.) before entering the entertainment world.

After training as a musician with Feroz Nizami, Akhtar began his career as a singer in 1969 before switching to acting in 1976.

== Entertainment career ==
=== Television ===
==== Television series ====
Akhtar has been active as an actor on television since the early 1980s; he played the lead role in PTV's Anarkali (1988), which was the acting debut of Zeba Bakhtiar.

In 2004, he acted in Moorat as an eunuch and also wrote the lyrics of the theme song, Bewafa Zamane Main Pyaar Dhoondhne Walo, with the music composed by Waqar Ali and sung by Tina Sani.

He starred in Mere Meherbaan, a romantic drama series, on Hum TV in 2014. It was directed by Farooq Rind and written by Maha Malik and produced by 7th Sky Entertainment banner.

==== Telefilms ====
In the early 2000s, he played a negative role in Indus TV's telefilm Firon, being the main antagonist.

In 2024, during the Eid Al-Adha celebrations, Pakistani channels aired many telefilms including Jori Ban Gayi with Saba Faisal and Mehmood Akhtar playing key roles.

=== Films ===
In 2018, Akhtar directed Na Band Na Baraati, a rom-com entirely shot in Canada.

=== Theatre ===
In 2024, Akhtar wrote and directed the play Aik Funkar 300 Beemar, a family comedy drama. In January 2025, it was staged in Toronto, Canada.

== Other work ==
=== Poetry ===
In addition to his acting career, Akhtar has also been involved in Urdu poetry. He has identified himself publicly as a poet and has recited his own verses in television talk shows and public appearances. During a 2025 interview on the comedy talk show Mazaq Raat, Akhtar spoke about his interest in poetry and recited lines of his own work; during the show, his ghazal "Bewafa Sang-e-Dil" was sung by Aoun Ali Khan, whose later father Nazakat Ali had sung it as well.

== Selected filmography ==
=== Television series ===
Year	Title	Role	Lyricist	Network
1980	Bahadur Ali	Mehmood		PTV
1981	Dehleez	Shahbaz		PTV
1984	Ana	Ejaz		PTV
1989	Jangloos	Allah Wasaya		PTV
1991	Saaya-e-Dewwar	Noman		PTV
1991	Sassi Punnu	Babi Ho		PTV
1991	Nasheman	Iffat's husband		PTV
1992	Din	Akhtar		PTV
1993	Kashkol	Aarsha		NTM
1993	Agar	Moazzam		PTV
1994	Aitraf	Shahid		PTV
1995	Chand Grehan	Saudagar		STN
1995	Mandi	Ramzan		PTV
1996	Ghar Daftar Aur Hum	Rashid		PTV
1996	Ilzam	Nadir Shah		PTV
1997	Hawain	Qudratullah		PTV
1997	Yeh Zindagi	Abdal		PTV
1997	Amma	Jameel		PTV
2003	Aanchal	Malik Mehfooz		PTV
2004	Tanha Tanha	Salman		PTV
2004	Be Zaban	Ishtiaq Hussain		PTV
2004	Moorat	Eunuch Shola	Yes	ARY Digital
2008	Kihnu Haal Sunawan Dil Da	Chauhdry Hamza		Apna TV
2013	Aasmanon Pay Likha	Aaliyan's father		Geo TV
2014	Mere Meherbaan	Baseer Hussain		Hum TV
2014	Joru Ka Ghulam	Chaudhry Fateh Muhammad Malik	Yes	Hum TV
2014	Mere Khuda	Sajjad		Hum TV
2015	Wajood-e-Zan	Azam		PTV
2015	Gul-e-Rana	Kamal Ahmed		Hum TV
2016	Tum Kon Piya	Muzaffar Hassan		Urdu1
2019	Bharosa Pyar Tera	Shaukat Hayat		Geo Entertainment
2020	Munafiq	Iqbal		Geo Entertainment

=== Films ===
Year	Title	Country	Director
2007	Godfather	Pakistan	
2012	Mr. Bhatti on Chutti	India	
2018	Na Band Na Baraati	Pakistan	Yes

=== Telefilms ===
Year	Title	Role	Network
2004	Mehak	Riyaz	Indus TV
