= Hina Khawaja Bayat =

Pakistani actress

Hina Khwaja Bayat
- Born: 8 September 1964 (age 61); Karachi, Pakistan
- Education: Convent of Jesus and Mary, Karachi
- Occupations: Actress, Anchor, Columnist, Social Activist
- Years active: 1996–present
- Known for: Humsafar; Zindagi Gulzar Hai; Mera Naam Yousuf Hai; Churails
- Spouse: Roger Dawood Bayat (m. 1992; died 2022)

Hina Khawaja Bayat (Urdu: حنا خواجہ بائیات; born 8 September 1964) is a Pakistani actress whose appearances include Manto, Ishq Gumshuda, Aunn Zara, Humsafar, Zindagi Gulzar Hai, Mera Naam Yousuf Hai, Shehr-e-Zaat and Parwaz Hai Junoon.

== Early life ==
Hina is ethnically Kashmiri and lives in Karachi. She completed her schooling from a convent, after which she attended the St. Joseph's College in Karachi and completed her graduation in Liberal Arts. Hina went on to pursue product designing at Pakistan Design Institute before her acting career started.

== Career ==
Bayat is an advocate for human rights, striving to educate the youth and women on their capabilities to stand up for their rights. She made her debut from the talk show “Andaaz Apna Apna” and “Baatein Mulakaatein”.

Talk shows like “Geo Hina Ke Saath” and “Uljhan Suljhan”, was her shot to fame, where she dealt with people's problems on a personal level on live calls. Hina Khawaja Bayat also co-hosted the show "Morning with Hum" along with "Atiqa Odho", her Humsafar co-star. Most of her dramas are on GEO TV and HUM TV.

== Personal life ==
In 1992, Hina married Roger Dawood Bayat, a Dubai-based business personality at an international conglomerate. He died in 2022. The veteran actress credits her success to her husband, and her mother, who have been a big support throughout her acting career. Hina and Dawood both loved children; Hina conceived multiple times but none of the pregnancies carried through.

== Filmography ==
=== Television series ===
Year	Title	Role	Notes	Ref(s)
2010	Jhumka Jaan		Hum TV	
2010	Ishq Gumshuda	Alizeh's mother	Hum TV	
2010	Uraan	Sana's mother	Geo Entertainment	
2011	Humsafar	Zarina	Hum TV	
2012	Mata-e-Jaan Hai Tu	Hajra Uzair	Hum TV	
2012	Shehr-e-Zaat	Falak's mother	Hum TV	
2012	Zindagi Gulzar Hai	Ghazala Junaid	Hum TV	
2012	Dil Ko Manana Nehi Aya	Imrana Maqsood	PTV	
2012	Aik Nayee Cinderella	Bano	Geo Entertainment	
2012	Jal Pari		Geo Entertainment	
2012	Aunn Zara	Husna	A-Plus Entertainment	
2012	Talkhiyaan	Appu Ji	Express Entertainment	
2014	Aahista Aahista		Hum TV	
2014	Bashar Momin	Bashar's mother	Geo Entertainment	
2015	Mera Naam Yousuf Hai	Aafiya Begum	APlus Entertainment	
2015	Muqqadus	Ruhi	Hum TV	
2015	Kaanch Ki Guriya		Geo Entertainment	
2015	Dua		Geo Entertainment	
2015	Tere Mere Beech	Sharla	Hum TV	
2016	Teri Meri Jodi		Geo Entertainment	
2016	Mor Mahal	Begum Sarwat Jehan	Geo Entertainment	
2016	Tum Kon Piya	Sharafat Begum	Urdu1	
2016	Sanam	Shabnan	Hum TV	
2016	Deewana	Husanara	Hum TV	
2016	Dil Banjaara	Fasiha Nafees	Hum TV	
2017	Kitni Girhain Baaki Hain (Season 2)	Episode 28 - Rehana	Hum TV	
2017	Begangi		A-Plus Entertainment	
2018	Tawaan	Mano's mother	Hum TV	
2018	Dilara	Noor Jahan (Khanam)	BOL Entertainment	
2019	Dil-e-Bereham		APlus Entertainment	
2019	Yaariyan	Aaliya	Geo Entertainment	
2019	Bhook	Lawyer	Hum TV	
2019	Shahrukh Ki Saliyan	Mrs Rao	Geo Entertainment	
2019	Daasi	Aahil's mother	Hum TV	
2020	Raaz-e-Ulfat	Rahma, Mushk's mother	Geo Entertainment	
2020	Khuda Aur Muhabbat 3	Jaagirdarni Shaista Begum Shah	Geo Entertainment	
2021	Ishq Jalebi	Iffat	Geo Entertainment	
2023	Jannat Se Aagay	Farooqs mother	Geo Entertainment	
2023	Khumar	Khekashaan	Geo Entertainment	
2024	Tere Mere Sapnay	Niggo	Geo Entertainment	
2024	Jaan Nisar	Amma Saien	Geo Entertainment	
2024	Faraar		Green Entertainment	
2025	Meri Uraan		Geo Entertainment	
2025	Mohalla		Express Entertainment	
2025	Case No 9		Geo Entertainment	
2026	Aik Aur Pakeezah	Saman's Mummy	Geo Entertainment	
2026	Rang De	Sameena	Geo Entertainment	

=== Web series ===
Year	Title	Role	Notes
2020	Churails	Sheery	Web Series on Zee5
2020	Ek Jhoothi Love Story		Web Series on Zee5
