= Mere Humdum Mere Dost =

- Title screen
- Genre: Drama; Romance
- Based on: Mere Humdum Mere Dost by Farhat Ishtiaq
- Directed by: Shahzad Kashmiri
- Starring: Adnan Siddiqui; Sanam Jung; Hareem Farooq; Shamim Hilaly; Farhan Ali Agha
- Theme music composer: Waqar Ali
- Opening theme: "Mere Humdum Mere Dost" by Nida Arab and Adeeb Ahmed
- Composer: Waqar Ali
- Country of origin: Pakistan
- Original language: Urdu
- No. of seasons: 1
- No. of episodes: 22

Production
- Producer: Momina Duraid
- Production location: Karachi

Original release
- Network: Urdu 1
- Release: 18 April – 12 September 2014

Mere Humdum Mere Dost (Urdu: میرے ہمدم میرے دوست, lit. 'My companion, my friend') is a Pakistani romantic drama television series. It first aired on Urdu 1 in April 2014. It was directed by Shahzad Kashmiri and produced by Momina Duraid. The drama serial is based on Farhat Ishtiaq's novel of the same name.

Zindagi started airing the series from 21 March 2016.

== Plot ==
Aimen, a 20-year-old girl, lives in poverty with her mother, Zainab, in a small town of Nawabshah in Pakistan's Sindh province. When Aimen was an infant, her father, Taufeeq Kamaal, had separated (not divorced) from his first wife, Zainab, and remarried to Almas. Aimen resents her father for this. Just before her death, Zainab writes a letter to Taufeeq and requests that he look after Aimen. Taufeeq, now a business tycoon in Karachi, receives the letter when he is about to leave for Turkey with his second wife Almas and their son Sahir. By this time, Zainab has died. Taufeeq requests his friend and business partner, Haider Masood, to pick Aimen up from Nawabshah and bring her to Karachi.

While Taufeeq is away, Aimen stays with Haider, and his aunt Bibi at their residence. Haider senses Aimen's loneliness and is kind to her. After Taufeeq returns, Aimen moves in with him and Almas but struggles to adjust to living with them. Haider encourages her to go for higher education and grooms her personality so that she can fit in with her father's elite social circle. Aimen and Haider gradually develop feelings for each other. Sajeela, who is Almas's sister and Haider's ex-wife, returns to Pakistan after a failed marriage to Mazhar. She hopes to remarry Haider. Sajeela tries to create tension between Aimen and Haider.

Feeling guilty about being in love with a girl who is 16 years younger to him, Haider suddenly decides to marry his old friend Fatima instead. Dejected, Aimen chooses to move back to her hometown Nawabshah. At the last moment, Haider confronts Aimen and admits his feelings for her. Haider and Aimen get formally engaged with the approval of their families.

== Cast ==
- Adnan Siddiqui as Haider Masood: Masood and Saleha's son; Maria's brother; Taufeeq's friend and business partner; Sajeela's first ex husband; Aimen's love interest.
- Sanam Jung as Umm E Aimen Taufeeq: Taufeeq and Zainab's daughter; Almas's stepdaughter; Sahir's half sister; Haider's love interest.
- Hareem Farooq as Sajeela Babar: Babar's daughter; Almas's sister; Haider and Mazhar's ex wife.
- Farhan Ali Agha as Taufeeq Kamaal: Zainab's widower; Almas's husband; Aimen and Sahir's father; Haider's friend and business partner.
- Zainab Qayyum as Almas Taufeeq: Babar's daughter; Taufeeq's second wife; Sajeela's sister; Sahir's mother; Aimen's step mother.
- Shamim Hilaly as Firdaus: Haider and Maria's aunt; Masood's sister.
- Junaid Khan as Mazhar Khan: Sajeela's second ex husband.
- Mizna Waqas as Maria Faizan: Haider's sister; Masood and Saleha's daughter; Faizan's wife.
- Hani Nadeem Essani as Sahir Taufeeq: Taufeeq and Almas's son; Aimen's half brother.
- Shakeel as Babar: Sajeela's and Almas's father; Firdaus and Masood's cousin.
- Nazli Nasr as Zainab Toufeeq: Aimen's mother; Taufeeq's first wife.
- Hasan Noman as Dr. Sajid Siddiqui: Haider's friend.
- Akber Islam as Arif: Zainab's landlord; Zaree's husband.
- Faraz Alam as Shaheer Javed: Aimen's classfellow who loves her.

== Production ==
The principal photography for the series took place in Turkey.

== Awards ==
- 14th Lux Style Awards - Best Television Actress - Sanam Jung (Nominated)

== Deviations from the novel ==
Farhat Ishtiaq has adapted her own novel, Mere Humdum Mere Dost, for the screen. Although nearly all of the plot is the same in the novel and the TV series, a few changes have been made. The role of Sajeela is not very prominent in the novel, whereas in the TV drama she is a major character.

== Soundtrack ==
The OST is composed by Waqar Ali and is sung by singers Nida Arab and Adeeb Ahmed. The song was well received by the audience.

== Reception ==
In their year-enders articles, Dawn was appreciative of the series for its lead cast performances and the cinematography, while The Express Tribune praised its writing and storyline.
