= Beena Chaudhary =

Pakistani actress (born 1968)

- Born: Lahore, Pakistan
- Education: University of Lahore
- Occupation: Actress
- Years active: 2000 – present
- Spouse: Mohammad Zahid Sohail (husband)
- Children: Hareem Sohail (daughter); Hannan Sohail (son)

Beena Chaudhary is a Pakistani actress. She is known for her roles in the dramas Romeo Weds Heer, Ishq Zahe Naseeb, Suno Chanda 2, Ghisi Piti Mohabbat and Kahin Deep Jaley.

== Early life ==
Beena was born in Lahore, Pakistan. She completed her studies from University of Lahore.

== Career ==
Beena made her debut as an actress on PTV in 2000. She was noted for her roles in the dramas Aik Thi Rania, Tohmat, Tishnagi Dil Ki and Gumrah. She also appeared in dramas Mohabbat Tumse Nafrat Hai, Haya Ke Daaman Main, Dekho Chaand Aaya, Sammi and Tum Kon Piya. Since then she has appeared in dramas Kaise Huaye Benaam, Mil Ke Bhi Hum Na Mile, Dharkan, Nazo, Raaz-e-Ulfat, Rasam and Khoob Seerat.

== Personal life ==
Beena is married to Mohammad Zahid Sohail. They have two children, a son named Hannan Sohail. Actress Hareem Sohail is their daughter.

== Filmography ==
=== Television ===
Year	Title	Role	Network
2011	Kountry Luv	Kishwar	A-Plus
2012	Doosra Chehra	Niggo	PTV
2012	Dasht-e-Muhabbat	Sultana	PTV
2012	Thakan	Zarina	ARY Digital
2012	Mil Ke Bhi Hum Na Mile	Hameedan	Geo TV
2013	Heer Ranjha	Bakhta	PTV
2014	Rasam	Zahida	Geo TV
2014	Jeena Dushwar Sahi	Maira's mother	PTV
2014	Noori	Rihana	TV One
2014	Malika-e-Aliya	Rani	Geo Entertainment
2015	Anaya Tumhari Hui	Mirha's mother	Geo TV
2015	Gila Kis Se Karein	Zubaida	Express Entertainment
2015	Zara Si Bhool	Sonia's mother	TV One
2015	Tere Lie	Almas	TV One
2015	Nazo	Aliya	Urdu 1
2015	Rang Laaga	Shehar Bano's aunt	ARY Digital
2015	Kaise Huaye Benaam	Shabana	Geo Entertainment
2015	Bari Bahu	Mona's mother-in-law	Hum TV
2016	Dharkan	Hajra	Hum TV
2016	Hum Sab Ajeeb Se Hain	Behtareen's neighbor	Aaj Entertainment
2016	Tum Kon Piya	Neha's aunt	Urdu 1
2016	Haya Ke Daaman Main	Rija's mother	Hum TV
2016	Dekho Chaand Aaya	Chaand's aunt	Geo TV
2016	Kambakht Tanno	Rehana	A-Plus
2016	Mera Yaar Miladay	Khala	ARY Digital
2016	Manjdhar	Mansoor's mother	Geo Entertainment
2017	Mohabbat Tumse Nafrat Hai	Suraiya	Geo TV
2017	Sammi	Naheed's sister-in-law	Hum TV
2017	Tishnagi Dil Ki	Ausaf's wife	Geo TV
2017	Laikin	Pervaiz's mother	A-Plus
2017	Meray Jeenay Ki Wajah	Narmah's mother	Express Entertainment
2017	Gumrah	Farkhanda	Hum TV
2017	Aik Thi Rania	Tara	Geo Entertainment
2018	Tu Jo Nahi	Sameer's mother	TV One
2018	Kyunke Ishq Baraye Farokht Nahi	Mustafa's mother	A-Plus
2018	Pari Hoon Main	Sajida	Express Entertainment
2018	Tohmat	Sumera	Geo TV
2018	Romeo Weds Heer	JD's mother	Geo Entertainment
2019	Gustakh Dil	Sarah's mother	Express Entertainment
2019	Bhanwar	Razia's mother-in-law	Express Entertainment
2019	Suno Chanda 2	Zarmeen Gul	Hum TV
2019	Mala Mir	Annie's mother	A-Plus
2019	Kahin Deep Jaley	Touqeer's mother	Geo Entertainment
2019	Dard Rukta Nahi	Tayyaba	Express Entertainment
2019	Zara Sambhal Kay	Mahnoor's mother	A-Plus
2019	Ishq Zahe Naseeb	Kashif's mother	Hum TV
2019	Tu Mera Junoon	Roshan's mother	Geo Entertainment
2019	Mein Na Janoo	Asma	Hum TV
2020	Dikhawa	Saira's neighbor	Geo Entertainment
2020	Makafaat Season 2	Kiran's mother	Geo Entertainment
2020	Mein Jeena Chahti Hoon	Shaista	Express Entertainment
2020	Aik Aur Munafiq	Amna	Geo TV
2020	Humraaz	Zori	Apna Channel
2020	Raaz-e-Ulfat	Bano's mother	Geo Entertainment
2020	Khoob Seerat	Najma	Geo Entertainment
2020	Mehar Posh	Mehru's aunt	Geo Entertainment
2020	Tera Ghum Aur Hum	Dani's mother	Hum TV
2020	Masters	Rohan's mother	Express Entertainment
2020	Ghisi Piti Mohabbat	Bee	ARY Digital
2021	Makafaat Season 3	Shariq's mother	Geo Entertainment
2021	Meri Dilli Wali Girlfriend	Malik's wife	SAB TV
2021	Oye Motti	Bano	Express Entertainment
2021	Bechari Qudsia	Nargis	Geo Entertainment
2021	Inteha-e-Ishq	Naseema	A-Plus
2021	Fasiq	Saima	Geo Entertainment
2022	Angna	Nida's mother	ARY Digital
2022	Dikhawa Season 3	Hoor's mother	Geo Entertainment
2022	Mamlaat	Amina	Geo TV
2022	Makafaat Season 4	Amber's mother	Geo Entertainment
2022	Saaya 2	Rabiya	Geo TV
2022	Bichoo	Shazia	Hum TV
2022	Siyani	Nusrat	Geo TV
2022	Bepanah	Fatima	Hum TV
2023	Bewafa	Shaista	Aan TV
2023	Makafaat Season 5	Bia's mother	Geo Entertainment
2023	Ahsaas	Rida's mother	Express Entertainment
2023	Sirat-e-Mustaqeem Season 3	Tania's mother	ARY Digital
2023	Mehar Mah	Zubaida Begum	Express Entertainment
2023	Dil Pe Zakham Khaye Hain	Rabia	Hum TV
2023	Mein Kahani Hun	Sarmad's mother	Express Entertainment
2023	Pyari Nimmo	Shakeela	Geo Entertainment
2023	Dooriyan	Washida Begum	Hum TV
2024	Saraab	Najma	Aur Life
2024	Tum Bin Kesay Jiyen	Shaista	ARY Digital
2024	Umm-e-Ayesha	Yasmin	Geo Entertainment
2024	Dikhawa Season 5	Komal's mother	Geo Entertainment
2024	Sirat-e-Mustaqeem Season 4	Hamza's mother	ARY Digital
2024	Habil Aur Qabil	Yasmin	Geo Entertainment
2024	Haq Mehar	Mussarrat	Geo TV
2024	Girhein	Suraiya	Geo TV
2025	Kathputli	Zubaida	Geo TV
2025	Makafat Season 7	Atiq's mother	Geo Entertainment
2025	Umme Ayesha Season 2	Nosheen	Geo Entertainment
2025	Na Tum Jano Na Hum	Bano	Green Entertainment
2025	Ilzam e Ishq	Hamza's mother	Hum TV
2025	Mohra	Shaista	Geo TV
2025	Daam-e-Mohabbat	Bina	Hum TV
2025	Humnava	Nusrat	Green Entertainment
2026	Iblees	Sultana	Geo Entertainment

=== Telefilm ===
Year	Title	Role
2020	Teray Pyar Mai	Sabra's sister
2021	Naya Zamana Ishq Purana	Safia

=== Film ===
Year	Title	Role
2022	Mithaie	Kami's mother
