= Sanam Jung =

Pakistani actor-model

Sanam Jung Qassam
- Born: 30 September 1988 (age 37); Karachi, Sindh, Pakistan
- Occupations: Actress, television presenter
- Years active: 2013–2023
- Spouse: Abdul Qassam Jafri (m. 2016)
- Children: 2

Sanam Jung (Urdu: صنم جنگ) is a Pakistani actress and television presenter. She is known for her leading roles in the popular television series Dil e Muztar (2013), Mohabat Subh Ka Sitara Hai (2013), Mere Humdum Mere Dost (2014) and Alvida (2015). From 2014 to 2018, she hosted the morning show Jago Pakistan Jago on Hum TV.

== Career ==
Jung started her career as a video jockey on Play TV in 2008, while studying for her undergrad in Business Administration (Banking and Finance) at the Institute of Business Management, Karachi, but then moved to AAG TV in 2010 during her MBA (Finance) from College of Business Management.

Jung made her acting debut in Dil e Muztar on Hum TV opposite Imran Abbas Naqvi, Sarwat Gilani, Aijaz Aslam, and Saba Hameed. In 2013, she appeared in Mohabat Subh Ka Sitara Hai opposite Mikaal Zulfiqar and Adeel Hussain. She next appeared in Mere Humdum Mere Dost with Adnan Siddiqui and Hareem Farooq. She then appeared in Alvida again with Imran Abbas Naqvi in 2015.

From 2014, till 30 November 2018, she was the host of Jago Pakistan Jago on Hum TV. Jung made her comeback with Mein Na Janoo in 2019 which was a joint venture between MD Productions and Cereal Production of Adnan Siddiqui. Sanam did a negative character for the first time in Qarar as Maya in 2020 with Mikaal Zulfiqar, Rabab Hashim, and Muneeb Butt on Hum TV.

== Television ==
Year	Serial	Role	Channel	Notes
2013	Dil e Muztar	Sila	Hum TV	Hum Award for Best Television Sensation Female; Nominated–Hum Award for Best Onscreen Couple Popular
2013	Muhabbat Subha Ka Sitara Hai	Rumaisa	Hum TV	Nominated–Hum Award for Best Onscreen Couple Popular
2014	Mere Humdum Mere Dost	Umm-e-Aimen	Urdu 1	
2015	Alvida	Haya	Hum TV	Hum Award for Best Onscreen Couple
2019	Mein Na Janoo	Saira	Hum TV	
2020	Qarar	Maya	Hum TV	
2023	Pyari Mona	Mona	Hum TV	
2023	Dhoka	Kainat	ARY Digital	

=== Telefilm ===
Year	Serial	Role	Channel	Notes
2013	Gher Aaye Mehmaan	Ainy	Hum TV	
2013	Dulha Mein Le Ke Jaungi	Aisha	ARY Digital	
2021	Hona tha pyar	Hania	Hum TV	

=== Show host ===
Year	Show	Role	Channel	Notes
2014–16; 2017–18	Jago Pakistan Jago	Host	Hum TV	Morning show
2015	3rd Hum Awards	Host	Hum TV	Awards show
2022	Akhri Khilari Kon	Host	Bol TV	Game show
