= Mohabbat Tumse Nafrat Hai =

Pakistani romantic drama serial

- محبت تم سے نفرت ہے
- Genre: Romantic drama
- Written by: Khalil-ur-Rehman Qamar
- Directed by: Farooq Rind
- Starring: Ayeza Khan; Imran Abbas; Shehzad Sheikh
- Original language: Urdu
- No. of episodes: 29

Production
- Editors: Farooq jawaid Shahbaz Ali Baloch
- Running time: 35–40 minutes
- Production company: 7th Sky Entertainment

Original release
- Network: Geo Entertainment
- Release: 8 April – 29 October 2017

Related
- Khuda Aur Muhabbat

Mohabbat Tumse Nafrat Hai (Urdu: مُحبَّت تم سے نَفرت ہے, "Love, I hate you") is a Pakistani romantic drama serial that aired on GEO TV. Written by Khalil-ur-Rehman Qamar, produced by 7th Sky Entertainment and directed by Farooq Rind, it stars Ayeza Khan, Imran Abbas and Shehzad Sheikh in the lead roles. The show premiered on 8 April 2017.

== Plot ==
The serial starts with the story of Kaneez Begum's family. She has suffered a lot in her life and witnessed the death of many of her kin. Despite losing all the attractiveness of the world, she has created a high-spirited environment in her house and cherishes every moment of life. Maheen (Ayeza Khan), the maternal granddaughter of Kaneez Begum, is short-tempered and egotistical, but adored by everyone in the family. Waqar (Imran Abbas), a grandson of Kaneez Begum returns from London and takes interest in Maheen. Although they both were hiding their feelings, Kaneez Begum gets the temperature of their love affair, which is against her wish. She wants Maheen to marry Gulraiz (Shehzad Sheikh) so she announces their engagement.

Gulraiz is shy, spineless and introverted although deep down he does love Maheen. Maheen's sister Fajar interrupts the matriarch's order and convinces Waqar and Maheen to openly claim their love interest. When Gulraiz finds out about Maheen's real feelings, he decided to sacrifice himself for that relationship. Just when it seems that life is going on the right track as per Maheen's wish, fate has something else in store for her. The fire of jealousy, grudges and hate turns their love into flaming ashes. On their wedding day, Waqar finds and reads Maheen's diary, causing him to leave her; which forces Gulraiz to marry her.

After 8 long years away in Paris, Waqar returns to Pakistan and the truth is unveiled by the girl who turned Maheen and Waqar lives upside down. Gulraiz, it is revealed, died years before of a blood cancer. Waqar is shattered as he now knows that everything was a misunderstanding created by Maheen's friend who had changed Waqar's name to Gulraiz in Maheen's diary with the help of a handwriting expert .After this Waqar somehow manages to convince Maheen for marrying him. Both of them get married, however on the wedding night, she consumes poison while having flashbacks of her wedding with Gulraiz.

The truth is revealed in a letter Maheen leaves. She told Waqar Ahmed she would kill him, leaving him in Hell.

In Maheen's letter, she asks why he never felt shame when he read "her" diary nor when he abandoned her. She also asks how he couldn't see the love she felt for him, even when begging him to not leave the first time. This fulfils her wish to let Waqar know the depth of despair she felt in his lack of trust and his betrayal; leaving him behind to know she felt he didn't deserve her, or anyone else's, love and had to witness Maheen, the love of his life's death.

== Cast ==
- Ayeza Khan as Maheen Aurangzeb
- Imran Abbas as Waqar Ahmad
- Shehzad Sheikh as Gulraiz Akhtar
- Saba Faisal as Kaneez Begum (Nanu/Dado)
- Kinza Hashmi as Fajar Aurangzeb
- Haroon Kadwani as Ali Ahmad
- Faryal Mehmood as Jiya (Villain)
- Saman Ansari as Mehrunnisa
- Farhan Ali Agha as Mansoor Ahmed
- Beena Chaudhary as Surayya
- Sabreen Hisbani as Neelam
- Khalid Malik as Wali Ahmed
- Manzoor Qureshi as Nawaz Mehtab Baig
- Malik Raza as Dastoor Ahmad
- Khuwajah Saleem as Munshi Alam
- Saife Hassan as Aurangzeb (cameo)

== Reception ==
Written by playwright Khalil-ur-Rehman Qamar, the drama was praised for its poetic and enchanting dialogues. Khan's character, Maheen, was the central protagonist of the entire story, and she carried the plot forward on her shoulders with ease and finesse. The drama was praised for its complex and detailed story that revolved around the consequences of egoism. Abbas was also praised for his performance, though his character was criticized for its odd decisions.

== Production ==
Sajal Aly was first approached for the role of Maheen. The official poster of the show had also been released featuring Sajal but later she gave up the project due to the ongoing shooting of her upcoming Bollywood debut film, Mom and for the promotion of currently released Pakistani movie, Zindagi Kitni Haseen Hay. Later Ayeza Khan was selected to portray the lead character.
