= Ishq Gumshuda =

Television series

- poster of Ishq Gumshuda released by Hum TV
- Genre: Drama
- Created by: Momina Duraid
- Written by: Noor-ul-Hada Shah
- Directed by: Haissam Hussain
- Country of origin: Pakistan
- No. of episodes: 22

Production
- Executive producer: Momina Duraid
- Running time: 45–50 minutes

Original release
- Network: Hum TV
- Release: 25 June 2010 – 2010

Ishq Gumshuda (Urdu: عشق گمشدہ) is an Urdu language Pakistani telenovela which was first broadcast in Pakistan in 2010 by Hum TV, premiering on 25 June 2010. Directed by Haissam Hussain and written by Noor-ul-Hada Shah, Ishq Gumshuda, which ended its run after telecasting 17 episodes, has been produced by Momina Duraid.

== Plot ==
Ali and Alize are best friends. They have a common friend named Neha. One day Ali's mother suggests to him that he should marry Alizeh, to which he happily agrees. An excited Ali shares with Neha that he is getting married, without revealing who his mother has suggested he should marry. When Alizeh gets to know this, she gets annoyed and starts avoiding Ali for the next few days. When confronted by Ali at the office one day, she shouts at him and asks him how marriage can come between their friendship.

Ali proposes marriage to Neha. When Alizeh finds out about the proposal, she is ecstatic and actively participates in the wedding preparations. Neha tells Ali that she has always loved him and is thrilled to be his wife. Ali unwillingly marries her. On the wedding night, he confronts Alizeh and asks her to marry him, but she refuses again.

Neha and Ali are now living a happily married life, but Alizeh starts hiding herself and her feelings from others. She begins to stay out of home for long hours, comes back home late and even experiences depression. Alizeh befriends a man named Farooq Saad, who is of the age of her father and is the husband of a woman named Parizaad, who is suffering from a mental disorder. Alizeh's new friendship disturbs her mother and father.

Determined to show Ali that she can make other friends than him, a jealous Alizeh, who now hides that she repents not marrying Ali, decides to marry Farooq Saad. When Ali learns this, he gets disturbed and informs Neha about it.

Neha tells Alizeh that she is not happy with Ali and asks her to take Ali from him. She also warns Alizeh that she won't let her marry a man of that age and destroy her life. Neha asks Ali to choose between her and Alizeh.

Alizeh meets Farooq Saad and asks him to marry her. Farooq tells Alizeh that he and Alizeh's mother had once loved each other during their younger days. He further informs her that he and Parizaad are leaving for their home in Iran soon. A disheartened Alizeh comes to Ali's home that night and confesses over a cup of coffee that she had always loved him. Alizeh decides to leave for London while Neha and Ali move on with their married life.

== Cast ==
- Sarwat Gilani as Alizeh
- Humayun Saeed as Ali
- Aamina Sheikh as Neha
- Samina Peerzada as Parizaad
- Javed Sheikh as Farooq Saad
- Hina Khawaja Bayat as Alizeh's mother
- Asif Raza Mir as Alizeh's father
- Shamim Hilaly as Ali's mother
- Lubna Aslam as Neha's mother

== International broadcast and release ==
- It was broadcast in India by Zindagi premiering on 5 September 2014. It ended its run in India on 21 September 2014 and was re-aired by Zindagi later, beginning on 18 October 2014 and ending on 6 November 2014.
