= Tum Kon Piya =

2016 Pakistani television series

- Urdu: تم کون پيا
- Genre: Romantic Drama
- Written by: Maha Malik
- Directed by: Yasir Nawaz
- Starring: Imran Abbas; Ayeza Khan; (For entire cast see below)
- Opening theme: "Tum Kon Piya" by Rahat Fateh Ali Khan
- Original language: Urdu
- No. of episodes: 29

Production
- Production company: 7th Sky Entertainment

Original release
- Network: Urdu 1
- Release: 23 March – 26 October 2016

Tum Kon Piya was a Pakistani romantic drama serial that aired on Urdu1. Directed by Yasir Nawaz and based on Maha Malik's best selling novel of the same name, it was produced by 7th Sky Entertainment. It starred Ayeza Khan, Imran Abbas, Ali Abbas, Hina Khawaja Bayat, Hira Tareen, etc. It premiered on 23 March 2016 and ended on 26 October 2016.

== Story ==
The middle-class girl Elma lives her life according to the wishes of her father, Waqar Ali. Waqar Ali works in an industrial business owned by his cousin Muzaffar Hassan, who is a millionaire. Elma's second cousin is Ramish Hassan, Muzaffar Hassan's kind-hearted son. On Elma and Ramish's first meeting, Ramish falls for Elma at first sight, and after a while both fall in love with each other.

Soon Ramish asks for Elma's hand in marriage. While Waqar accepts the proposal, Ramish's parents don't concur with him because they want him to marry Sumbul. So, his parents initially pretend to have accepted his love for Elma. Soon after, Ramish's father calls Waqar to his house and insults him, telling him that marriages can be arranged according to the status of the families. After this insult, Elma's father arranges her marriage somewhere else. Ramish's parents then pretend as if they took the marriage proposal to Waqar, but he refused. But Ramish is aware that his parents are at fault. He is heartbroken, and Elma has no other option but to accept her father's will.

Elma marries Zarbab, but is sad and struggles to stay happy with her, husband and mother-in-law (the one who always scolds her and regrets getting her married to her son). Elma's husband Zarbab doesn't love Elma, as he loves his girlfriend Javeria and wants to marry her, and keeps meeting her even after his marriage to Elma.

As Zarbab's younger brother and Elma's brother-in-law Arif fail their exams, Elma is asked to approach Ramish to give Arif a job, which Ramish readily does. Arif later falls in love with his colleague, marries her, and lives happily. Because of the treatment she receives, Elma is still alone and sad and always thinks about Ramish and talks to him in her dreams. On the other hand, Ramish's parents try to force him to marry Sumbul, but he doesn't listen to them because he still loves Elma. To help things for himself, Ramish confesses his love for Elma to Sumbul, who still doesn't refuse to marry him as she has fallen in love with him.

In the meantime, Elma's father passes away without being able to see Elma for the last time because of her mother-in-law not allowing her to visit him, following which Elma's younger sister Neha is taken by Elma to her home. However, Elma's mother-in-law berates Neha to the extent of Ramish taking her to live at his house, where Ramish's parents initially do not like her but later warm up to her good nature.

Zarbab continues meeting with his girlfriend, even when Elma is pregnant and gives birth to a baby boy named Afnan. Ramish repeatedly helps Elma and Zarbab to handle their financial situation in light of various unfortunate occurrences, including Arif selling their ancestral house and Elma's mother-in-law passing away due to cancer. Ramish keeps an eye on Zarbab discreetly meeting his girlfriend and informs Elma about him, who is shown to already be aware of it.

When Elma confronts Zarbab about it, he debars her from having any contact with Ramish thereafter.He also temporarily leaves Elma with their son to confirm a better job opportunity, terrified at being confronted about his relationship with his girlfriend. Ramish visits Elma to reiterate his support for her, which Arif uses to his advantage alongside his own fallout with his wife to poison Zarbab's mind against Elma.

As per Javeria and Arif's plotting together, Arif sends Ramish to Elma's house on the false pretext of Afnan being unwell. While Elma and Ramish deduce Arif's lie, Zarbab arrives and sees Ramish with Elma together. Zarbab ends up heavily insulting both, ending with him divorcing Elma and going to Islamabad to meet Javeria. Elma gets hospitalised out of shock.

It is revealed that Javeria plotted all this just to humiliate Zarbab, as vengeance for not choosing her over Elma as per his mother's will. Resultantly, Zarbab decides to accept a job in England, leaving Ramish to handle his son Afnan and an invalid Elma. Sumbul decides to back off from her arrangement with Ramish, and on her suggestion, everyone agrees to have Ramish marry Neha to take care of Elma and Afnan.

After 5 years, Zarbab returns to Karachi, when his younger sister confesses everything to him about Arif's actions and Elma's innocence. She also reveals about Arif getting hospitalised in a mental asylum. When Zarbab goes to Ramish's house to meet Elma, she is already hospitalised and dies right after his visit. Zarbab realises his mistake and grieves over misunderstanding Elma. He then tries to take his son from Ramish. But his son hates him and believes that Ramish is his father. Witnessing this Zarbab leaves me heartbroken. In the end, we see Elma's spirit happily looking at Ramish, Neha, and Afnan being together.

== Cast ==
| Character | Portrayed by |
|---|---|
| Ramish Hasan | Imran Abbas |
| Elma Ali | Ayeza Khan |
| Zarbab Khan | Ali Abbas |
| Sharafat Begum | Hina Khawaja Bayat |
| Waqar Ali, Elma's father | Qavi Khan |
| Muzaffar Hasan | Mehmood Akhtar |
| Sumbul, Ramish's fiancé | Hira Tareen |
| Neha Ali | Shameen Khan |
| Seema Ali | Faria Sheikh |
| Neha's aunt | Beena Chaudhary |
| Afnan Khan | Sami Khan |
| Tamkanat Begum | Azra Mohyeddin |
| Arif, Zarbab's brother | Yasir Shoro |
| Javaeria, Zarbab's girlfriend | Kiran Tabeir |
| Sobiya, Zarbab's sister | Aroha Khan |
| Rania, Arif's wife | Esha Noor |
| Sajid, Seema's husband | Ahad Khan |
| Furqan, Subiya's husband | Iktidar Khan |

== Soundtrack ==
Tum Kon Piya – OST

Soundtrack album by Rahat Fateh Ali Khan
- Released: 31 May 2016
- Recorded: 2016
- Genre: Television soundtrack
- Length: (4:13)
- Language: Urdu
- Label: Urdu 1

Music video
- "Tum Kon Piya" OST on YouTube

The title song was sung by Rahat Fateh Ali Khan. The music was composed by Sahir Ali Bagga and the lyrics were written by S.K. Khalish.

== See also ==
- 2016 in Pakistani television
- List of Pakistani dramas
- Mera Naam Yousuf Hai
- Khuda Aur Muhabbat
