= Raaz-e-Ulfat =

Pakistani family drama television series

- Genre: Romantic
- Written by: Maha Malik
- Directed by: Siraj-ul-Haque
- Starring: Yumna Zaidi; Shehzad Sheikh; Komal Aziz Khan; Gohar Rasheed; Arisha Razi
- Opening theme: "Raaz-e-Ulfat" by Shani Arshad & Aima Baig
- Country of origin: Pakistan
- Original language: Urdu
- No. of episodes: 38

Production
- Producers: Abdullah Kadwani; Asad Qureshi
- Running time: 37 mins (approx.)
- Production company: 7th Sky Entertainment

Original release
- Network: Geo Entertainment
- Release: 7 April – 22 December 2020

Raaz-e-Ulfat (Urdu: رازِ اُلفت, lit. 'Love's secret') is a Pakistani romantic drama television series premiered on Geo Entertainment on 7 April 2020. It is written by Maha Malik, produced by Abdullah Kadwani and Asad Qureshi under 7th Sky Entertainment and directed by Siraj-ul-Haque. It features Shehzad Sheikh, Yumna Zaidi, Komal Aziz Khan and Gohar Rasheed in the lead roles. The supporting cast include Arisha Razi, Hina Khawaja Bayat, Seemi Pasha and Tara Mahmood. It is the story of Mushk, a young and innocent girl from a conservative family whose life is governed by her father Iftikhar Ali. Mushk has no choice other than following the principles set by her father until she meets Sehba and her life changes forever.

It received praise for Zaidi and Aziz's performance as protagonist and antagonist respectively. It is digitally available to stream on YouTube and in some countries on VIU App. In India, it is telecasting on Atrangii TV Channel and streaming digitally on Atrangii App.

== Synopsis ==
Mushk (Yumna Zaidi) belongs to a conservative family and obeys her father Iftikhar Ali (Tanveer Jamal). She follows the principles set by her father until she meets Sehba (Komal Aziz Khan). Sehba, who likes modern lifestyle, influences Mushk and they become friends. Sehba has a childhood friend named Nomi (Danial Afzal Khan). Nomi is a bad person who is involved with drugs, smoking and gambling. He was friends with Irtiza but they stopped. Sehba really likes Nomi but Nomi doesn't take it seriously. As Sehba starts to develop a liking for Irtiza (Shehzad Sheikh), she gets jealous when she discovers Mushk and Irtiza's newfound relationship. Hatching vicious plans, Sehba makes Mushk's life difficult and she loses her family and her lover's trust. One day, Nomi and Sehba make a plan to trap Mushk in Nomi's house right before her wedding with Irtiza. Sehba, Under the Fake love of friendship, Picks up Mushk from the Salon she was getting her hair and makeup done in, and peer pressures her in going to a party, where she drugs mushk and locks her in nomis room. Sehba leaves the house while Nomi in a drunken state tries to enter the room Mushk is in. Police raids and arrests everyone in the house. Mushk hides in a cupboard and manages to escape Nomi's house. Meanwhile, Irtiza and Mushk's family are searching for her. Seeing Mushk in a disheveled state, everyone believes the worst of her. Irtiza and his family call off their engagement and Mushk is stood up on her wedding. Then enters Ismael whom Mushk's father asks to marry his daughter and finally Mushk while waiting for Irtiza to show up becomes a reluctant bride of Ismael. Iftikhar Sahib dies of a heart attack sometime later. Ismael and Mushk are living like strangers under one roof with no love in their relationship yet. Sehba succeeds in her attempts to make Irtiza misunderstand Mushk and he decides to marry her as per the wish of both of their families. To spite Mushk, Sehba visits her home to give her the wedding invitation which Mushk decides to attend with Ismael. On the wedding day, Nomi discloses Sehba's shameful secret and conspiracy clearing Mushk's name and leaving Irtiza in agony over losing a pure girl like Mushk. Sehba murders Nomi and ends in hospital with injuries then passes away a few days later after asking forgiveness from Mushk. Mushk chooses to be with Ismael after witnessing his goodness, kind nature and loving attitude. Irtiza is left heartbroken with Mushk forgiving him but refusing to be with him for a second time. Mushk and Ismael live in love and harmony.

== Cast ==
=== Main cast ===
- Shehzad Sheikh as Irtiza
- Yumna Zaidi as Mushk (Irtaza's Love Interest)
- Komal Aziz Khan as Sehba (Antagonist) (Dead)
- Gohar Rasheed as Ismail

=== Recurring cast ===
- Arisha Razi as Amber (Mushk's sister)
- Hina Khawaja Bayat as Rahma (Mushk's mother)
- Tanveer Jamal as Iftikhar (Mushk's father)
- Seemi Pasha as Ghazala, Irtiza's mother
- Farhan Ali Agha as Naveed, Sehba's father
- Jinaan Hussain as Mohini, Ismail's sister
- Tara Mahmood as Munaza, Sehba's mother
- Danial Afzal Khan as Nomi (Antagonist)
- Nida Mumtaz as Fouzia, Nomi's mother
- Manzoor Qureshi as Sadam, Irtiza’s father
- Agha Talal
- Faisal Bali
- Jawed Ali
- Hanif Muhammad
- Hina Sheikh

=== Guest appearance ===
- Kiran Haq as Geeti (Ismail's Wife)
- Anam Tanveer as Bano Aapa; Mushk's neighbour
- Beena Chaudhary as Bano's mother

== Awards and nominations ==
| Date of ceremony | Award | Category | Recipients | Result | Ref. |
|---|---|---|---|---|---|
| October 9, 2021 | Lux Style Awards | Best Television Director | Siraj-ul-Haque | Nominated | |
| October 9, 2021 | Lux Style Awards | Best Television Writer | Maha Malik | Nominated | |
| October 9, 2021 | Lux Style Awards | Best Television Play | 7th Sky Entertainment | Nominated | |
| October 9, 2021 | Lux Style Awards | Best Female Actor- Viewer's choice | Yumna Zaidi | Nominated | |
| October 9, 2021 | Lux Style Awards | Best Original Sound Track | Yehi Tou Raaz-e-Ulfat Hai - Aima Baig and Shani Arshad | Nominated | |
| November 5, 2021 | Pakistan International Screen Awards | Best Title Track/OST | Yehi Toh Raaz e Ulfat Hai - Shani Arshad/Aima Baig | Nominated | |
| November 5, 2021 | Pakistan International Screen Awards | Best Supporting Actor | Gohar Rasheed | Nominated | |
