= Jo Chale To Jaan Se Guzar Gaye =

Pakistani television series

- Title screen
- Genre: Drama, Romance
- Written by: Maha Malik
- Directed by: Nadeem Siddiqi
- Starring: Noman Ijaz; Sami Khan; Saba Qamar
- Opening theme: Jo Chale To Jaan Se Guzar Gaye by Waqar Ali
- Country of origin: Pakistan
- Original language: Urdu
- No. of episodes: 23

Production
- Producers: Asif Raza Mir; Babar Javed
- Camera setup: Multi-camera setup
- Running time: 30-35 minutes
- Production company: A&B Entertainment

Original release
- Network: Geo Entertainment
- Release: 19 September 2011

Jo Chale To Jaan Se Guzar Gaye is a Pakistani drama television serial premiered on Geo Entertainment on 19 September 2011. The serial is directed by Nadeem Siddiqi, written by Maha Malik, and produced by Asif Raza Mir & Babar Javed under their banner A&B Entertainment.

== Plot ==
The story of Jo Chale To Jaan Se Guzar Gaye revolves around Zufishan (Saba Qamar) who is from a middle-class background. She has been engaged to her cousin Azar (Sami Khan) and is deeply in love with him. A feudal landlord, Sayed Alim Shah (Noman Ijaz), sees her and falls in love with her. He forces Zufishan to marry him, but she refuses as she is engaged to her cousin.

Alam Shah kidnapped Azar and blackmail Zufishan to marry him. Finally, Zufishan decides to marry Alam Shah, who then releases Azar. She does not even tell the whole story to Azar and marries Alam Shah while Azay is out of country. In an accident Alam Shah loses his legs. With the passage of time Zufishan starts loving her husband and the story moves on. When Azar gets the real facts about her marriage, he gets shocked and asks Zufishan to get a divorce from him but she refuses. At the end, Alam Shah committed suicide by taking poison and Azar gets Zufishan again.

== Cast ==
- Noman Ijaz as Sayed Alam Shah
- Sami Khan as Azar
- Saba Qamar as Zufishan
- Qavi Khan as Dawar Shah
- Kashif Mehmood as Asim
- Jana Malik as Kanwal Dawar
- Farhana Maqsood as Jabeen

== Reception ==
In a review by Javaria Farooqui published in DAWN Images in 2022, the reviewer critiqued the portrayal of toxic masculinity in the series.
