= Ayeza Khan =

Pakistani actress (born 1991)

- Born: Kanza Khan; 15 January 1991 (age 35); Karachi, Sindh, Pakistan
- Education: NICE Pakistan
- Occupations: Actress; model
- Years active: 2009–present
- Known for: Pyarey Afzal (2013); Mere Paas Tum Ho (2019); Chupke Chupke (2021); Mein (2023)
- Spouse: Danish Taimoor (m. 2014)
- Children: 2
- Awards: Pakistan International Screen Awards
- Honours: UAE Golden Visa

Ayeza Khan (born 15 January 1991) is a Pakistani actress who works in Urdu television. Khan has established herself as one of the leading television actresses and is a recipient of several accolades including three Hum Awards and two Lux Style Awards. Khan has been described among the nation's highest-paid actresses by the media.

After making her debut with Tum Jo Miley in 2009, Khan garnered recognition through her roles in Pyarey Afzal (2013), Mere Meherbaan (2014), Tum Kon Piya (2016), Mohabbat Tumse Nafrat Hai (2017), Tau Dil Ka Kia Hua (2017), Koi Chand Rakh (2018) and Chupke Chupke (2021). For the last of these, she won Hum Award for Best Actress Popular. Khan further received critical praise her portrayal of Mehwish in Mere Paas Tum Ho (2019).

Khan has also appeared in many telefilms. She is married to actor Danish Taimoor, with whom she has two children. As of July 2022, Khan was the second most-followed Pakistani celebrity on Instagram.

== Early life ==
Ayeza Khan was born as Kanza Khan, on 15 January 1991 in Karachi, Sindh. She has one brother and one sister.

== Career ==
=== Early work and its recognition (2007–2012) ===
Ayeza Khan participated in a contest "Pantene Shine Princess" while studying in school and became the first runner-up. Soon after this, she got offered to work as a model in a telecom advertisement. Then she started focusing on modeling. While in college, she started taking more modeling offers and eventually shifted to showbiz rather than continuing her studies.

She was offered a supporting role in the Ramadan comedy-series Tum Jo Miley in 2009 opposite Fahad Mustafa, Sunita Marshall, and many others. In 2010, she was offered the main lead in the spiritual series Pul Sirat. After doing supporting roles in 2011, several television series, she appeared in the leading role in the Geo Entertainment romantic drama, Tootay Huway Per with Mohib Mirza and Anoushay Abbasi.

=== Established actress (2013–present) ===
In 2014, Khan portrayed as Farah in melodramatic romantic series her performance in the drama serial, Pyaray Afzal alongside Hamza Ali Abbasi and Sohai Ali Abro for which, she earned her Best Actress at Lux Style Awards. She was offered many roles in Bollywood, which she rejected. She took a break for a while from the industry after her marriage. She later appeared after a gap of two years in the tragic romantic series Tum Kon Piya opposite Imran Abbas. Then in 2018 she appeared as a gynecologist in family series Koi Chand Rakh alongside Muneeb Butt, Areeba Habib and Imran Abbas in their third collaboration after Tum Kon Piya and Mohabbat Tumse Nafrat Hai.

In 2019, Khan appeared in Antagonistic lead as Cunning Zobiya in family betrayal series Yaariyan opposite Junaid Khan and Momal Sheikh. Then, she portrayed as over ambitious women Mehwish in romantic melodrama series Meray Paas Tum Ho alongside Humayun Saeed, Hira Mani and Adnan Siddiqui earned her Pakistan International Screen Award for Best Television Actress. for which she critically applauded and earned her Pakistan International Screen Award for Best Television Actress.

Then, in 2020 Khan starred in Mehar Posh as a kind-hearted girl Mehru along with Danish Taimoor and it is the seventh project featuring real life couple together. In 2021, she appeared as a happy-go-lucky girl with childish mannerisms in the Ramadan comedy series Chupke Chupke, opposite Osman Khalid Butt. Khan received praise for her on-screen chemistry with Butt and won the Hum Award for Best Actress and Lux Style Award for Best TV Actress. In the same year, khan portrayed as a tiktoker in Laapata opposite Sarah Khan and Ali Rehman Khan.

In 2022 and 2023, Khan appeared in two consecutive Ramadan series portrayed as innocent college student Pari in the family comedy series Chaudhry and Sons along with Imran Ashraf in their third project together after Shehrnaz and Toh Dil Ka Kia Hua. Latter, she received nomination in Lux Style Award for Best TV Actress. Then, acted in lighthearted series Chand Tara opposite Danish Taimoor and the series failed to achieve the level of popularity.

In the same year, her performance in Bafar Mehmood's tragedy series Mein opposite Wahaj Ali in which, she portrayed as an egoistic lady Mubhashira with bipolar disorder was well-received critics and audiences. Then, ayeza played as a headstrong and kind hearted Mahnoor in Jaan-e-Jahan opposite Hamza Ali Abbasi in their second project together after Pyaray Afzal.

In 2025, Khan going to appear in Humraaz opposite Zahid Ahmed and Feroze Khan in their second project together after Bikhra Mera Naseeb and audiences praised ayeza's performance. Then, in 2026 ayeza going to collaborate for the first time with Bilal Abbas Khan in upcoming series Sitara Aur Siyara.

== Personal life ==
Khan married actor Danish Taimoor in 2014, after an 8-year relationship since 2006, shared by the couple in a morning show Ek Nayee Subha with Farah. Taimoor, while talking to Maria Wasti at Croron Mein Khel-Bol TV on 25 March 2020, revealed that he met Ayeza Khan for the first time on social networking site. She gave birth to a daughter in 2015, and a son in 2017.

== Other work and media image ==
Khan has been described in the media, among Pakistan's most popular and highest-paid actresses. In 2014, Khan was the country's second most searched person on Google. Khan was placed in Hello Pakistan's HOT100 list, in the "Trailblazers" category in 2020. The actress serves as a brand ambassador for several products such as Himalaya, Dabur, Harpic and Lifebuoy and has done several photoshoots. Khan was also the most-followed Pakistani celebrity on Instagram, until surpassed by Hania Aamir in 2024.

In 2024, Ayeza Khan enrolled at the prestigious Royal Academy of Dramatic Arts (RADA) in London, fulfilling a lifelong dream to study theatre formally after years in the industry, a move she announced that emphasizing it's never too late to learn and thanking her supportive family for making it possible. In March 2024, she was honored with the UAE 10-year Golden Visa, a recognition granted by the Dubai government to influential figures in the arts and culture.

Then, in September 2025 Khan's Instagram content, achieved a massive milestone and Record-Breaking, soaring past 100 million views across her profile within just 30 days, solidifying her dominance in the digital space.

== Filmography ==
=== Television ===
Year	Title	Role	Notes	Ref
2009	Tum Jo Miley	Shehna	Ramadan special	
2010–2011	Sandal	Dania		
2011	Tootay Huway Per	Ajiya	Debut as lead	
2011–2012	Maaye Ni	Sania		
2012	Mi Raqsam	Sadia		
2012	Zard Mausam	Aiman		
2012	Mera Saaein 2	Noor		
2012–2013	Aks	Zoonaira Javed (Zooni)		
2012–2013	Kahi Unkahi	Zoya		
2013	Adhoori Aurat	Maryam Aftab		
2013–2014	Pyarey Afzal	Farah Ibrahim		
2013–2014	Meri Zindagi Hai Tu	Naznin (Nazo)		
2014	Do Qadam Door Thay	Nayab Iqbal		
2014	Mere Meherbaan	Haya Baseer		
2014	Jab We Wed	Nisa Mehra	Ramadan special	
2014–2015	Bikhra Mera Naseeb	Hina Alvi		
2016	Tum Kon Piya	Elma Ali		
2016–2017	Shehrnaz	Shehrnaz Gul		
2017	Mohabbat Tumse Nafrat Hai	Maheen Aurangzeb		
2017–2018	Tau Dil Ka Kia Hua	Maya Naamdaar		
2018–2019	Koi Chand Rakh	Dr. Rabail Zain (Rabbi Jee)		
2019	Yaariyan	Zobiya Hamid		
2019–2020	Meray Paas Tum Ho	Mehwish Danish Akhtar		
2019–2020	Thora Sa Haq	Seher Zamin Ahmad		
2020–2021	Mehar Posh	Mehrunnisa Shah Jahan (Mehru)		
2021	Chupke Chupke	Maneeha Faaz Ibrahim (Meenu)	Ramadan special	
2021	Laapata	Geeti		
2022	Chaudhry and Sons	Parisa Ahmed (Pari)	Ramadan special	
2023	Chand Tara	Dr. Nain Tara Sarim	Ramadan special	
2023–2024	Mein	Mubashira Jaffar (MJ)		
2023–2024	Jaan-e-Jahan	Mahnoor Shehraam		
2025	Humraaz	Sara Ahmed		
2026–present	Sitara Aur Siyara	TBA		

=== Special appearances ===
Year	Title	Role	Network	Ref	Notes
2011	Kitni Girhain Baaki Hain	Kaneez Fatima	Hum TV		Episode: "Dekh Kabeera Roya"
2011	Kitni Girhain Baaki Hain	Sadaf	Hum TV		Episode: "Faqat Tumhara Saleem"
2012	Kahani Aik Raat Ki	Saadi	ARY Digital		Episode: "Aane Wala Pal"
2012	Kahani Aik Raat Ki	Ushna	ARY Digital		Episode: "Sitamgar"
2013	Extras: The Mango People	Ayesha	Hum TV		Episode: "The Common People"
2013	Sasural Ke Rang Anokhay	Maya	Hum TV		Episode: 8
2013	Shareek-e-Hayat	Maya	Hum TV		Episode: "Tumhaara Saath Jo Hota"

=== Telefilm ===
Year	Title	Role	Network	Ref
2012	Eid Pe Aao Na	Rakhshi	ARY Digital	
2014	Main Kukkoo Aur Woh	Zoya	Hum TV	
2016	Teri Meri Love Story	Sonia	Geo Entertainment	
2017	Kahin Pol Na Khul Jaye	Ayeza	ARY Digital	
2019	Vespa Girl	Saba	Hum TV	

=== Film ===
Year	Title	Role	Ref	Notes
2017	Actor in Law	Herself on Billboard		Special appearance

== Awards and nominations ==
Year	Work	Category	Result	Ref.
Lux Style Awards
2015	Pyaray Afzal	Best TV Actress	Won	
2020	Mere Paas Tum Ho	Best TV Actress - Viewer's Choice	Nominated	
2020	Mere Paas Tum Ho	Best TV Actress - Critics' Choice	Nominated	
2021	Mehar Posh	Best TV Actress - Viewer's Choice	Nominated	
2022	Chupke Chupke	Best TV Actress - Viewer's Choice	Won	
2023	Chaudhry and Sons	Best TV Actress - Viewer's Choice	Nominated	
2025	Mein	Best TV Actress - Viewer's Choice	Nominated	
2025	Jaan-e-Jahan	Best Actor of the Year - Female Viewers’ Choice	Nominated	
Hum Awards
2015	Mere Meherbaan	Best Actress Popular	Nominated	
2015	Mere Meherbaan	Best Actress Jury	Nominated	
2022	Chupke Chupke	Best Actress Popular	Won	
2022	Chupke Chupke	Best Actress Jury	Nominated	
2022	Chupke Chupke	Best Onscreen Couple Popular with Osman Khalid Butt	Won	
2022	Chupke Chupke	Best Onscreen Couple Jury with Osman Khalid Butt	Won	
Hum Social Media Awards
2020	—N/a	Most Popular Actor (Female)	Nominated	
2020	—N/a	Most popular Off Screen Couple with Danish Taimoor	Nominated	
2020	Meray Paas Tum Ho	Most Popular On Screen Couple with Humayun Saeed	Nominated	
International Pakistan Prestige Awards
2021	Meray Paas Tum Ho	Best Actor Female TV Serial	Nominated	
2021	Meray Paas Tum Ho	Best on-screen TV Couple with Humayun Saeed	Nominated	
Sukooon Kya Drama Hai Icon Awards
2025	Jaan-e-Jahan	Best Actress (Popular Choice)	Nominated	
2025	Jaan-e-Jahan	Best Actress (Critics’ Choice)	Nominated	
Hum Style Awards
2020	—N/a	Most Stylish Actor TV- Female	Nominated	
2024	—N/a	Most Stylish Actor TV- Female	Nominated	
Pakistan International Screen Awards
2020	Meray Paas Tum Ho	Best TV Actress	Won	
ARY Digital- Social Media Drama Awards
2019	Koi Chand Rakh	Best Actor Female (Serial)	Nominated	

== Other recognitions ==
Year	Title	Category	Ref.
2024	UAE Golden Visa	Federal Authority for Identity & Citizenship (ICA)	
