= Maha Malik =

Pakistani novelist and screenwriter

- Occupations: Author, novelist, screenwriter
- Writing career
- Language: Urdu
- Notable works: Jo Chale To Jaan Se Guzar Gaye and Mere Meherbaan

Maha Malik (Urdu: ماہا ملک) is a Pakistani novelist and screenwriter. She started her career through Khawateen Digest and has written dozens of novels and plays for television. Most of her plays have been adapted for screen with the script written by herself for Geo TV, ARY Digital and Hum TV. She has been nominated for Best Television Writer at Lux Style Awards and Hum Awards. Her novels have been praised by Daily Times of Pakistan for her portrayal of women's lives.

== Selected works ==
=== Novels ===
- Aik He Lagan
- Dil Ka Muqadma Haar Kar
- Meray Khwaab Reza Reza
- Musafaton Kay Lamhay
- Tum Kon Piya
- Raigzaar e Tamanna
- Palak Pay Utartay Azaab Likhun
- Yeh Bulbulain Yeh Titliyaan
- Chaand Si Dulhan
- Jo Chalay Tou Jaan Say Guzar Gaye

=== Television plays ===
- Sandal
- Jo Chale To Jaan Se Guzar Gaye
- Meray Khwab Raiza Raiza
- Meri Ladli
- Maaye Ni
- Hal-e-Dil
- Na Kaho Tum Mere Nahi
- Ranjish Hi Sahi
- Kaash Aisa Ho
- Kaisay Tum Se Kahoon
- Mere Jeevan Saathi
- Mere Meherbaan
- Tum Kon Piya
- Koi Chand Rakh
- Khasara
- Raaz-e-Ulfat
- Aye Musht-e-Khaak
- Khumar

== Awards and nominations ==
- 2014: Hum Award for Best Writer Drama Serial - Mere Meherbaan
