= Mein Na Janoo =

Pakistani TV series

- Genre: Drama; Thriller
- Written by: Nooran Makhdoom
- Directed by: Furqan Khan
- Starring: Zahid Ahmed; Sanam Jung; Affan Waheed; Komal Aziz Khan
- Theme music composer: Shuja Haider
- Opening theme: "Mein Na Janoo" by Shuja Haider
- Country of origin: Pakistan
- Original language: Urdu
- No. of episodes: 37

Production
- Executive producer: Momina Duraid
- Producers: Adnan Siddiqui; Akhter Hussain
- Production companies: MD Productions; Cereal Entertainment

Original release
- Network: Hum TV
- Release: 16 July 2019 – 31 March 2020

Related
- Mere Humdam; Kashf

Mein Na Janoo is a 2019 Pakistani television series co-produced by Momina Duraid and Adnan Siddiqui under their home banners of MD Productions and Cereal Entertainment. It features Sanam Jung, Zahid Ahmed, Affan Waheed and Komal Aziz Khan.

== Plot ==
Saira and her mother, Farah, face a lot of abuse from her cantankerous paternal grandmother and step-mother, Tehmina. Her half-sister, Kiran, is very kind with both of them. Saira's father, Waleed has two wives, having one daughter with each: Saira, who is his first wife's daughter and Kiran, who is his second wife's daughter. Saira's father also has two younger sisters and each of them have a son. His first sister, Sabra, has a son named Zulqarnain "Nain", a former air force fighter pilot, who is now visually impaired. His younger sister, Asma, has a son named Nehat, who developed feelings for Saira. Saira too has feelings for him. On the other hand, Kiran develops feelings for Nehat, but Nehat does not feel the same way. Even though Saira treats Nain as a brother, she harbors mild feelings for him yet Nain does loves Saira. However, the family doesn't approve of Saira and Nehat being together and as a result, Nehat gets engaged to Kiran. On the mehndi night of Kiran and Nehat, Nehat snatches the gun from the guard and runs off with Saira. Asma, Tehmina and her mother-in-law blame Farah for this. Nain then takes action against Nehat and gets Saira back. Once Saira has been found and returns safely, Nain beats Nihat to the point that he is hospitalized. Tehmina and Ama Ji were about to visit Nehat in hospital but Waleed forbids them from doing so and decides to cut all ties with Asma. Tehmina blames Saira for this. Soon, Waleed decides to marry Saira off with Nain to save her honor. However, Saira doesn't approve of this relationship as she thinks her father is trying to get rid of her by getting her married to a blind person. When Nehat finds out about this, he goes mad. However, Saira also develops feelings for Nain and the couple lives a good and loving life. Nehat starts stalking Saira and causes disputes to arise in Saira and Nain's relationship. Meanwhile, Waleed's younger brother Asghar had been missing for 20 years and they had all blamed Farah since then. It had been revealed that he was in a coma for 15 years in hospital. He had been found and returned home safely. Asghar helps Farah clear her name and let her regain her honor. Nehat marries Kiran but is actually still obsessed with Saira. One night when Nehat goes into Saira's house, Nain discovers him and tries to kill him but Saira stops him from doing so, which makes Nain think that she had been having an affair with Nehat. Nain distrusts Saira and kicks her out. That leads to a big drama with the drop scene of Nehat being alone and a cripple in one leg due to a fight gone wrong with Nain and his divorce from Kiran. Nehat's parents move to Islamabad due to his father's new job but Nehat did not want to go leaving Saira so decides to stay behind. Nain and Saira patch up their differences and live happily ever after.

== Cast ==
- Zahid Ahmed as Flight Lieutenant Zulqarnain a.k.a. Nain
- Sanam Jung as Saira
- Affan Waheed as Nehat
- Komal Aziz Khan as Kiran
- Waseem Abbas as Waleed
- Beena Chaudhary as Asma
- Huma Nawab as Farah
- Sangeeta as Amma
- Seemi Pasha as Sabra
- Ayesha Gul as Tehmina
- Imam Syed as Asghar
- Hashim Butt as Farrukh

== Reception ==
The show was earlier liked by the viewers as it marked the return of Sanam Jung on small screen after a long time. It gained 6.7 TRPs at its highest. Later, it was criticized due to its huge complex storyline and unnecessarily dragging.
