= Mera Naam Yousuf Hai =

Pakistani television drama serial

- Title screen
- Also known as: Zulaikha Bina Yousuf
- Genre: Romantic drama
- Written by: Khalil-Ur-Rehman Qamar
- Directed by: Mehreen Jabbar
- Starring: Imran Abbas; Maya Ali; Mansha Pasha; Waseem Abbas; Hina Khawaja Bayat; Faizan Shaikh
- Theme music composer: Sultan Athor
- Opening theme: "Tu Mera Nahi" by Saad Sultan & Imran Abbas
- Composer: Saad Sultan
- Country of origin: Pakistan
- Original language: Urdu
- No. of episodes: 20

Production
- Executive producer: Abid Ul Razaq
- Producer: Sadia Jabbar
- Production locations: Karachi, Sindh, Pakistan
- Cinematography: Qasim Ali Mureed
- Editors: Farooq Javed; Majid Riaz; Shahbaz Ali Baloch
- Camera setup: Multi-Camera
- Running time: 35–40 minutes
- Production company: Sadia Jabbar Production

Original release
- Network: A-Plus Entertainment
- Release: 6 March – 17 July 2015

Mera Naam Yousuf Hai (Urdu: میرا نام یوسف ہے, transl. My name is Yousuf), previously titled Zulekha Bina Yusuf (زلیخا بنا یوسف, "Yousuf without Zulekha"), is a Pakistani television drama serial, which originally aired on A-Plus Entertainment from 17 March to 27 October 2015, in 20 episodes. Mera Naam Yousuf Hai followed a forbidden love story of Yousuf and Zulaikha and was loosely based on the story "Yusof-o Zulaikhā" (یوسف و زلیخا) by Jami in his book Haft Awrang.

Mera Naam Yousuf Hai stars Maya Ali and Imran Abbas as the title characters Zulaikha and Yusuf, respectively, as well as Hina Khawaja Bayat, Waseem Abbas, Behroze Sabzwari, Mizna Waqas and Mansha Pasha in recurring roles. Saadia Jabbar produced the series, and it aired on A-plus Entertainment as part of a night programming of 20:00. It was written by Khalil-Ur-Rehman Qamar and directed by Mehreen Jabbar.

== Plot ==
The story is a love story between Yousuf and Zulaikha. On a train to Karachi, Yousuf sees Zulaikha and gets attracted towards her not for her beauty but because of her name. Yousuf is a musician who sings and plays music. On the other hand, Zulaikha is the daughter of a Maulana (religious scholar) and has a younger sister and an older brother. At the station, Yousuf asks her about her name, but she denies that she is Zulaikha, as Yousuf is a stranger. Later on, Yousuf has a friend named Daaji, with whom he makes music, and Daaji has a sister named Madiha, who is in love with Yousuf but does not express her feelings. Somehow, Yousuf knows that Madiha is attracted to him but does not want that relationship as she is his best friend's sister.

Later, Yousuf tells Daaji about the girl he saw on the train and the incident. Then one day, when Yousuf is dropping his sister off at her school, he sees a man in a van and thinks he has seen this man before. He waits and then follows the van, which leads to a house. The van belongs to Zulaikha's brother. Yousuf follows him and reaches home. There he lies, and he says that he is a postman, and a letter is there with him for Zulaikha. Zulaikha comes downstairs and does not recognize him at first. He asks, "Are you Zulaikha?" She answers, "Yes!" He says his name is Yousuf and leaves.

So he went to her house to tell her his name. When Daaji asks him if he is in love. He says he is not in love. He felt it was important to tell her his name, and he still does not know why.

Sometime later, his friend Daaji asks him to take him to Zulaikha's house. There they meet an old friend who is surprisingly their neighbour. Yousuf makes a plan that he will go to her terrace through his friend's connecting terrace. There he reaches; Zulaikha sees him and is shocked and irritated, as she does not like him. He says he is in love with her, and she tells him she is about to marry her cousin Imran Mughiz. Yousuf says that her Nikkah (marriage) will not happen if his love for her is true. He gives her his number and says she can call him if she does not marry. When he is about to leave, Zulaikha's father sees him but not his face and runs after him, but Yousuf escapes.

Zulaikha meets Imran Mughiz, whom she does not want to marry as she wants to study further. After leaving the cafe with her sister, she again encounters Yousuf, who is not following her and is there by coincidence. Zulaikha starts saying things to him as she thinks he is following her, and she leaves. Imran Mughiz sees the whole situation and goes straight to Yousuf and starts misbehaving with him. Daaji comes in between and punches the man and runs with Yousuf. Imran Mughiz complains to Zulaikhas father about this. They file a complaint and find Daaji. The police arrest him. After learning from Madiha that Daaji is in jail, Yousuf goes to the police. He says he is the main culprit, and they should let his friend go. Zulaikha's father sees him and remembers him as the train man, and now Yousuf is slapped multiple times.

At the police station, the police beat Yousuf mercilessly. On the other hand, Zulaikha's younger sister informs her the police have arrested Yousuf and are bashing him. Zulaikha is happy and says she warned him not to follow her, but he did not listen. Now he faces the consequences. Her sister warns her that her big brother has gone to the police station to make his video and confession, and when she sees the video, she should make sure that she should still smile when seeing the video and leaves. Suddenly Zulaikha's smile fades.

After the beating, Zulaikha's father asks Yousuf about him and Zulaikha. Yousuf answers that he saw her on the train, and there is no fault of Zulaikha. She dislikes him a lot. Her father asks why he follows her and answers that he has fallen in love with her and receives another slap. Zulaikha gets the video of Yousuf and starts to cry.

== Cast ==
| Actor | Character |
|---|---|
| Imran Abbas | Yousuf Wajih Ahmed |
| Maya Ali | Zulaikha Noor Mohammad |
| Hina Khawaja Bayat | Aafiya Bano Begum |
| Behroze Sabzwari | Wajih Sultan Ahmed |
| Waseem Abbas | Maulvi Noor Mohammad |
| Mansha Pasha | Madiha |
| Aliee Shaikh | Dajee |
| Taqi Ahmed | Imran Moeez |
| Faizan Shaikh | Ali Hamza |
| Mizna Waqas | Hajra Noor Mohammad |
| Faizan Shaikh | Wali Noor Mohammad |
| Seema Seher | Yousuf's mother |
| Parveen Akbar | Kausar Parveen |
| Farah Nadeem | Bushra |
| Anas Ali Imran | Tony |

== Production ==
Producer Sadia Jabbar of Sadia Jabbar Productions developed Mera Naam Yousaf Hai (initially titled Zulekha Bina Yousuf). She hired successful director Mehreen Jabbar to direct the series. Khalil-ur-Rehman Qamar wrote the show. It is loosely based on the story of Yusuf and Zulaikha by Jami in his book Haft Awrang. Khalil-ur-Rehman Qamar wrote the screenplay, while Naman Ali composed the script. Approximately twenty-one episodes of, Zulaikha Bina Yousuf were completed in February 2015. However, in mid-March 2015, production house changed its name to Mera Naam Yousuf Hai and changed its premier to 6 March 2015. Sultan Athor composed the song, while the OST was given by Saad Sultan. The show aired weekly episodes for 35–40 (without commercials) minutes every Friday to 18 July 2015.

Producer Sadia Jabbar chose Imran Abbas Naqvi and Maya Ali to play the leading roles of Yousuf and Zulaikha, respectively. The actors Mansha Pasha, Waseem Abbas, Behroze Sabzwari, Hina Khawaja Bayat, and Seema Seher were selected to portray Madiha, Noor Muhammad, Waji Ahmed, Afiya, and Hajira, respectively.

The filming of ’Mera Naam Yousaf Hai’ began in November 2014 and was completed in February 2015 under the title Zulaikha Bina Yousuf. With the title Zulekha Bina Yousuf, it was set to release on 12 March 2015, but on 2 March 2015, it was announced that the channel would release it on 6 March.

== Soundtrack ==
Mera Naam Yousuf hai

Soundtrack album by Saad Sultan and Rizwan Anwar
- Released: February 2015
- Recorded: 2014
- Genre: Theme song
- Length: 2:21; 1:10
- Language: Urdu
- Producer: Sadia Jabbar

Track list
| No. | Title | Singer(s) | Length |
|---|---|---|---|
| 1. | "Tu Mera Nahi" | Rizwan Anwar; Imran Abbas; Saad Sultan | 2:21 |
| 2. | "Mahiya Duur Gaya" | Umair Ahmed | 5:40 |
| 3. | "Tu Mila Hai" | Omer Nadeem, Zenab Fatimah | 1:22 |
| 4. | "Aj Se" | Rizwan Anwar | 1:15 |

== Broadcast and release ==
Mera Naam Yousuf Hai was originally broadcast on A-Plus Entertainment from 12 March 2015 to 6 July 2015.

The show was rebroadcast in Pakistan on ATV (Pakistan) by the title Gar Badnaam Huay (گر بدنام ہوۓ).

Star India began airing on 19 October 2015 on their channel Star Plus and thus became the channel's first-ever Pakistani drama. The series aired in UAE, USA, Ireland, UK, Austria, Europe, Canada and Latin America, excluding India. The series received extravagant reception in viewership and ratings. After airing on Star Plus, it was aired on Star India, Life OK. The show was aired from 2 April 2016 to 5 June 2016 and aired on weekends. On Life OK, it was also the first ever Pakistani drama on the channel.

It also aired in India on Zindagi.

Since July 2020, the show has been available for online streaming on the Indian OTT platform Zee5.

== Reception ==
=== Critical appreciation ===
Sadaf Siddiqui of Dawn News states that Mera Naam Yousuf Hai is off to a smooth start in her issue. She praised the Writer's story line, stating Writer Khalil-ur-Rehman Qamar's pen aspires to the tragic, the epic, and the unusual, and as his previous drama Pyare Afzal has shown, in some cases it succeeds. She also praised Mehreen Jabbar as director, stating Director Mehreen Jabbar managed to keep Khalil sahib’s flair for drama under her subtle control. She has not let the dialogue overpower the narrative. It helps that the drama's production values are excellent, as is the visual story telling with hints at the characters inner lives. She lauded Maya Alli, Imran Abbas Naqvi, and Hina Khawaja Bayat's roles by saying Maya Ali's restrained performance as Zulekha proves she's a director's actor, and so far Mehreen Jabbar has guided her well. Imran Abbas, who seems perennially youthful, also, pardon the pun, strikes a chord as the dreamer Yousuf. But if there was an actor who stole the spotlight today, it has to be Hina Khwaja Bayat.

Siddiqui, in her other issue, praised the show's plot and melodrama, stating, "TV drama Mera Naam Yousuf Hai plays the filmi card and wins." She further added that "it isn't merely film in the sense that it features over-the-top melodrama; there are also a fair number of larger-than-life events to contend with. These events aren't just plot points pushing the story forward; they're like cogs in a vast machine that represent the characters' interconnected, messy lives." She commented on Khalil-Ur-Rehman Qamar's screenplay, stating that "Khalil sahib's script brings into question society's hypocrisies and double standards, as well as the different roles, expectations, and allowances for men and women." She also praised Mehreen Jabbar's director's saying "It is quite commendable that despite all these filmi touches and a tendency to go over the top, Mehreen Jabbar's directorial hand is very much in control." In an issue of Dawn 6 April 2015, Sadaf Siddiqui stated that "Mera Naam Yousuf Hai is a One- sided love story so far." She comments not the plot, stating, "What does one do when one's own parents are engaged in a game of one-upmanship, placing one's freedom and right to choose in jeopardy?". For the current episode are Sadaf once again praised Qamar's classic storyline stating "Khalilur Rehman Qamar’s writing sparkles with wit and clearly unke kamaan pe bahut se teer hai. The way of the story and each of the characters are revealed adds something new to the plot progression and builds on each characters back stories."

On 29 July 2015, Sadaf Siddui praised the show's screenplay and storyline, commenting, "Do class concerns trump love? Mera Naam Yousuf Hai asks big questions". In her article, she said that the "writer creates chemistry and romantic tension between the leads despite them not sharing much screen time. It is sheer mastery that makes allowance for conservatism and added that he carefully tends to family relationships and friendships." After summing up the entire show and story line, Siddiqui said that "The drama makes important observations about power: in our patriarchal society and its lopsided and unfair ways, people use power to perpetuate their own interests and maintain the status quo." She also praised the series conclusion, where she added that "The biggest surprise perhaps was that Khalil sahib allowed the lovers to reunite, however not without a near death experience". It is the only drama to air on the famous Indian channel Star Plus.

== See also ==
- Tum Kon Piya
- Sadqay Tumhare
- Yusuf and Zulaikha
- Zulekha
- Yusuf
