= Jaanisaar =

2015 film directed by Muzaffar Ali

- Directed by: Muzaffar Ali
- Written by: Javed Siddiqui; Shama Zaidi; Muzaffar Ali
- Produced by: Meera Ali
- Starring: Imran Abbas; Pernia Qureshi
- Cinematography: Gianni Giannelli
- Edited by: Sankalp Meshram
- Release date: 7 August 2015
- Country: India
- Language: Hindi

Jaanisaar is a 2015 Indian Hindi-language historical drama film, directed by Muzaffar Ali, and written by Javed Siddiqui, Shama Zaidi and Muzaffar Ali. Jaanisaar is the love story of a revolutionary tawaif of Awadh, India, and a prince brought up in England, set 20 years after the first war of the Indian Rebellion of 1857. The film stars Imran Abbas and Pernia Qureshi, the latter making her debut with the film. The film was released on 7 August 2015.

== Plot ==
A period drama set in 1877, the film depicts the story of a revolutionary killer, Prince Amir Haydar, Noor and Mir Mohsin Sahab. Raja Amir Haydar, son of Nawab Raja Abbas Haydar, is sent to London by the British after the death of his father. He comes back to India after the completion of his studies. Noor is a tawaif who fights against the British secretly in the organization made by Mir Mohsin. Haydar and Noor fall in love with each other, and he also participates in the freedom fight against the British alongside Noor and Mir Mohsin.

The film explores the intersection of personal romance and political defiance as the trio navigates the escalating tensions of the Indian independence movement.

== Cast ==
Actor	Character
Imran Abbas	Prince Amir Haydar
Pernia Qureshi	Noor Bano Begum
Muzaffar Ali	Mir Mohsin Sahab
Dalip Tahil	Kunwar Iqbal Hasan
Abid Yunus Khan	Ratan Singh
Carl Wharton	Sir John Cavendish
Beena Kak	Mushtari Jaan
Natalie Arikan	Kitty Sykes
Luv Bhargav	Raja Alipur
Benjamin Coakley	Robert McCullay
Farrukh Jaffar	Noor's Grandmother

== Production ==
=== Development ===
Jaanisaar marks the comeback of director Muzaffar Ali, who is known for his cult film Umrao Jaan (1981). The film was initially titled Raqs: The Dance Within, but was later changed to Jaanisaar. Muzaffar Ali said in an interview− "People would often ask me what 'Raqs' means, so I thought of calling the film something that was more familiar, like 'Jaanisaar'. There were also some problems with registering the name. 'Raqs' is already registered with a body, I wasn't aware of. So, we had to rename the film." The film is produced by Ali's wife, Meera, and Arno Krimmer is the executive producer. Regarding the story-line, Ali commented− "I feel our own people need to learn certain parts of our history to become more responsible citizen. History is written into two ways -- written by conqueror and the other one is the human history. I felt this story has to be told. The country needs to know this story."

=== Filming ===
The film has been entirely shot in Uttar Pradesh, mostly in Lucknow Quaiserbagh Baradari. Some scenes were filmed at the director's hometown, Kotwara (Lakhimpur-Kheri, U.P.). Ali remarked, "Jaanisaar is set in 20 years after Umrao Jaan, that is 1877. I always like to delve into the past to look at the future. I shot the film in our house." Birju Maharaj and Kumudini Lakhia have choreographed the dance sequences.

=== Casting ===
The film has Pakistani actor Imran Abbas Naqvi, his second film in Bollywood, preceded by Creature 3D. It also marks the debut of Pernia Qureshi, who is a notable fashion stylist and costume designer by profession. Regarding her appearance in the film, director Muzaffar Ali remarked, "Pernia is different. I needed a strong dancer and at the same time a fresh face. She really danced her life out into the film. She did a very good job of a revolutionary dancer."

== Soundtrack ==
Playback singers for Jaanisaar include notable Indian and Pakistani artists such as Shreya Ghoshal, Abida Parveen and Sukhwinder Singh and famous folk singer Malini Awasthi. The music has been composed by Muzaffar Ali & Ustad Shafqat Ali Khan. Shreya Ghoshal has given her voice to 5 tracks from the album. The full album was released on 24 July 2015.

Jaanisaar

Soundtrack album by Muzaffar Ali & Ustad Shafqat Ali Khan
- Released: 24 July 2015
- Genre: Feature film soundtrack
- Label: Zee Music Company

No.	Title	Singer(s)	Length
1.	"Hamein Bhi Pyar Kar Le"	Shreya Ghoshal
2.	"Champayi Rang Yaar Aajaye"	Shreya Ghoshal, Ustad Shafqat Ali Khan
3.	"Sufiye Ba Safa Manam (Male)"	Shafqat Ali Khan
4.	"Teri Katili Nigahon Ne Mara"	Malini Awasthi
5.	"Aye Zulfe–E-Pareshaan"	Sukhwinder Singh, Shreya Ghoshal
6.	"Masnad Luti"	Shreya Ghoshal
7.	"Har Taraf Andhera Hai"	Sukhwinder Singh
8.	"Sawan"	Malini Awasthi
9.	"Achchi Surat Pe"	Shreya Ghoshal
10.	"Sufiye Ba Safa Manam (Female)"	Abida Parveen
