= Jago Pakistan Jago =

- Poster for Jago Pakistan Jago's
- Genre: Breakfast Television; Entertainment
- Directed by: Haji Al Balos
- Presented by: Ghazal Siddiqui (2005-08); Sanam Baloch (2008-09); Fahad Mustafa (2009-14); Sanam Jung (2014-16, 2017-18); Noor Bukhari (2016-17); Sadia Imam (2017)
- Country of origin: Pakistan
- No. of seasons: 4
- No. of episodes: 555 episodes

Production
- Executive producer: Maimona Siddiqui
- Producer: Rehan Ahmed
- Production location: Karachi, Pakistan
- Running time: 120 minutes (per episode)

Original release
- Network: Hum TV
- Release: 18 January 2005 – 30 November 2018

Jago Pakistan Jago (Urdu: جاگو پاکستان جاگو, lit. 'Wake Up Pakistan Wake Up!') was a Pakistani daytime television program broadcast on Hum TV from 2005 to 2018. Over the years it was presented by Ghazal Siddiqui (2005–08), Fahad Mustafa (2009–14), and Sanam Jung (2014–18), among others. The show aired from Monday to Friday.

== History ==
From 2005 to 2008, Morning with Hum was presented by actress Ghazal Siddiqui. After her departure, Sanam Baloch hosted the show for a year. The show was then rebranded as Jago Pakistan Jago. Fahad Mustafa, who had been a co-host since the start, left in 2014.

Sanam Jung came on as a host on 1 September 2014 and quickly became the public's favorite host. She had to take a month-long maternity leave at the end of the year. Sadia Imam hosted the show during the break. Sanam Jung came back in February 2017 and hosted the show until the last episode on 30 November 2018.

Jago Pakistan Jago concluded on 30 November 2018, after 13 years of telecast. No reason was given for this abrupt end. The show ended with a grand episode remembering everything from the past.
