= Pernia Qureshi =

Indian stylist and entrepreneur

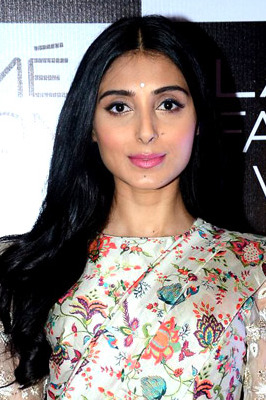
- Quershi at Lakme Fashion Week in 2016
- Born: Pakistan
- Citizenship: India (till 2008); United States (since 2008)
- Education: George Washington University
- Occupations: Entrepreneur, kuchipudi dancer, actor, stylist, podcaster
- Spouses: Arjun Prasad (m. 2011; div. 2012) Sahil Gilani (m. 2018)

Pernia Qureshi is an Indian American fashion entrepreneur and classical dancer based in New Delhi and Mumbai.

== Personal life ==
Qureshi's roots are from the town of Rampur, Uttar Pradesh. She did her schooling from Woodstock School in Mussoorie India and is an alumnus of George Washington University.

== Life and career ==
From a young age she has trained as a Kuchipudi dancer under the discipleship of Padma Bhushan Awardees Raja Radha Reddy. She has performed across India and worldwide. Her performances include the Commonwealth Games, Khajuraho Dance Festival and Jashn E Rekhta Festival.

In her early career, Qureshi worked as a stylist for Harper's Bazaar, Elle, and CondeNast, and designed costumes for the 2010 Bollywood film Aisha. In 2012 Qureshi's entrepreneurial journey began when she founded Pernia's Pop Up Shop. It was India's first e-commerce platform selling Indian designer wear to a global clientele.

Qureshi is a published author. Early in her career she released a book titled Be Stylish with Penguine Random House India. It was published in October 2013 and is a fashion guide for South Asian women. It addresses body types, cultural context and occasion dressing among other things. Recently, Qureshi has published a book called Ammi's Kitchen with Roli Books. It has her grandmother's heirloom recipes with the best dishes Rampur has to offer.

In 2024 Qureshi started India's first video podcast in the category of luxury, lifestyle and fashion. Fashionably Qureshi is a commentary and reflection on these industries in India today. Pioneers in lifestyle and fashion such as Sabyasachi, Manish Malhotra and Sonam Kapoor have appeared as guests. The podcast, Fashionably Pernia, is available to view/hear on Spotify and Youtube.

With a significant instagram following, Qureshi has partnered with several brands including Dyson, Jio World Plaza, Tanqueray, BMW, Conrad Hotels, Levis, Chivas Regal and Lancome Paris.

== Work ==
Pernia has played the lead role of a tawaif in Muzzafar Ali's period drama film, set in pre-independence India. The film's name is Jaanisaar and was released on 7 August 2015.

== Filmography ==
- Jaanisaar (2015)
