= Mere Meherbaan =

2014 Pakistani television series

- Title screen
- Genre: Romance
- Written by: Maha Malik
- Directed by: Farooq Rind
- Starring: Ayeza Khan; Neelam Muneer; Sanam Chaudhry; Madiha Rizvi; Humayoun Ashraf
- Country of origin: Pakistan
- Original language: Urdu
- No. of episodes: 28

Production
- Producers: asad
- Production locations: Karachi, Sindh
- Editor: Hayat
- Camera setup: Multi-camera setup
- Running time: 36 – 43 minutes

Original release
- Network: Hum TV
- Release: 10 April – 17 November 2014

Mere Meherbaan (Urdu: میرے مہربان, lit. 'My benefactor') is a 2014 Pakistani romantic drama serial that aired on Hum TV. It was directed by award-winning director Farooq Rind, written by Maha Malik and produced by 7th Sky Entertainment. It stars Ayeza Khan, Neelam Muneer, Sanam Chaudhry, and Madiha Rizvi. The show concluded its final, 28th episode on November 17, 2014.

== Synopsis ==
Mere Meherban is a story of two women and their daughters, Shaista and Nayyara. Shaista is selfish and has ruined her husband's life. Shaista's daughters, Muskaan and Iraj are stylish and are rude and aggressive, especially toward their cousins.

Nayyara is Shaista's cousin and married Shaista's brother-in-law. She is happy and middle-class. Meanwhile, Nayyara's daughters, Fala and Haya, are respectful.

== Plot ==
The story starts with soon to be engaged Muskan. Muskan and Iraj always quarrel because they are wealthy girls who have neither manners nor respect, but they love their mother, Shaista, who also loves them. They have an elder brother Zeeshan, who loves his sisters but hates their attitude. The mother and daughters hate their father's brother Baseer and his family because that family is poor. Baseer's family includes him, his wife Nayyara, and three daughters, Fala, Haya and Fariya. They all are well-mannered. Shaista constantly insults Nayyara and treats her daughters poorly. Muskaan goes to her aunt Nayyara's Mansion, where she asks Fala for a pedicure and manicure as Fala had done many parlour courses. Fala and Nayyara taunt and say foul words to Muskan and kick her out of the Mansion. Muskan returns to her villa and tells her mother everything. Hearing this her mother gets furious and goes to Nayyara's Mansion and confronts the women and says how dare she act rudely towards her daughter. Nayyara slaps Shaista on the face and tells her to shut up, reminding her of her past and says you forgot your past that your husband loved me, but you came in between. Hearing this Shaista runs away. Muskan taunts Shaista and calls her a dumb mother who is scared of her sister-in-law. Muskaan's father Nazir comes from New York with gifts. Iraj likes a bottle of perfume, and because of this Muskaan is jealous and they fight, breaking the perfume bottle. Shaista is busy looking at the gifts. Love is the only emotion between Nayyara's daughters, while Iraj and Muskaan always fight. Nazir goes to Nayyara's mansion and it is later revealed that he used to love Nayyara. Nayyara used to like Nazir, but just respects him now. He gives 400000 to each of her daughters out of love, and Iraj sees this.

The next day during the engagement, Iraj insults Nayyara's daughters. Nayyara slaps Iraj's face and insults her in front of the guests. Nazir beats Iraj with stick until she faints and stops her pocket money. Danish's aunt Naima visits Fala and starts liking her. She is interrupted by Shaista, and she asks for a family photo. Naima tells Fala to come, but Shaista insults Fala. Nayyara comes to Nazir and starts crying Nazir hugs her and asks what happened, Nayyara tells him that the wicked Shaista insulted her daughter Fala hearing this Nazir goes to his villa in furious. Nazir slaps Shaista and warns her that if she ever dares to say anything to Nayyara and her daughters, he will kick Shaista out of his villa. Shaista and her daughters get angry.

The next day, Iraj talks loudly on her phone in Muskaan's room. Muskaan receives a call from Daanish, her fiancé. Because of Iraj's voice, Muskaan cuts the phone, and then later they start fighting. Their father comes and starts beating them with his stick. He kicks Muskan's stomach and slaps Iraj. Shaista comes between and he starts beating her; Zeeshan stops his father. Nazir warns the sisters and Shaista that next time they fight in his house he will burn them alive.

The next day, Naima goes to Nayyara's Mansion. Nayyara accepts her proposal of Ayaan for Fala. Zeeshan expresses his feelings for Haya to Nazir. Nazir is happy because Nazir is greedy and wants wealth from Baseer since Baseer is 20 times richer than Nazir. Baseer is very excited. Nayyara is not so happy because she thinks Haya will be sad there, but later agrees. But Shaista refuses. She hates Haya and says that she will never be her daughter-in-law. She thinks that Nayyara is taking revenge on Shaista . But Nazir disagrees with Shaista and is happy with Haya's and Zeeshan's marriage.

Later, two engagements take place simultaneously. One is of Haya and Zeeshan, and the other is of Fala and Ayaan. Iraj, Muskaan and Shaista are unhappy. Danish and his family visit Muskaan to decide the wedding date. There Muskaan says to Danish that neither she will work nor wear eastern suits. She will wear only modern clothes. Muskaan and Fala get married.

Muskaan has a sweet mother-in-law, but she hates her. Haya's mother-in-law is unkind towards her. Fala's mother-in-law and husband, Ayaan, are kind, but have hidden that Ayaan has a son, Sulaiman. Fala is shocked; her self-esteem crashes. She returns to her Mother's house, but later comes to terms, returns to her in-law's side, and accepts her husband's son.

Iraj creates a false story of her friend's birthday party and marries her love, Shehryar. She takes her and Sabrina's jewelry for him. The blame for the theft goes on Haya, and Shaista creates a ruckus. Zeeshan says nothing to support Haya. Shaista throws Haya out of the house. This breaks Haya who has a breakdown. Seeing her vulnerable condition and her broken self-esteem Nayyara calls off the engagement. He is later married to Sabrina by his mother. Meanwhile, Muskaan is showing her true colours in her in-laws house. She does not listen to Danish and when her mother-in-law wants to go for a Get Together party, she ridicules her, saying that despite her age, she wants to party.

Fala and Ayaan are happy. Sulaiman's mother and Ayaan's ex-wife Mariya comes to meet Sulaiman. Naima puts forth a condition that if she wants to meet her son, she has to take him forever. Ayaan and Fala are against it, but they have to accept it.

Nazir has a fatal heart attack in Dubai and is his body is bought to Pakistan by Wali Ahmed, who previously lived with him in Dubai. His death brings Nayyara's family and Shaistha, Iraj and Zeeshan together but not Muskaan; her behaviour remains the same.

Iraj is now married to Wahaj, a rich businessman. Nobody knows of her marriage to Wahaj. She starts feeling insecure about her marriage and returns to her mother's house. She questions her existence and is mentally disturbed because Shehryaar never returned. Later it is discovered that she, Nayyara, and Shehryaar died illegally entering another country. She is heartbroken. Iraj comes back and tells the truth about the jewelry. Muskaan is surprised to learn that her husband has remarried. She comes to her house.

Iraj starts liking Wahaj and returns to her in-law's house when he comes to take her back. Shaista and Sabrina have become enemies, and Sabrina leaves Zeeshan. Now Shaista's and her children's lives have become a living hell. Haya is going to marry to her other cousin. Zeeshan asks for forgiveness and reacceptance, but Haya refuses. Meanwhile, Shaista goes with Muskaan and Zeeshan in Nayyara's house to talk about Haya. She sees that Haya's rishta is fixed. Shaista is in shock. Muskaan's mother-in-law comes to take her, but she insults her. She calls Danish and says, "I will come only if you leave your second wife and come to pick her up". He refuses. So, in anger, she requests a divorce. He gives her the divorce papers. She is shocked.

Fala and Ayaan are living happily. His son Suleiman stays with them. Zeeshan leaves the house. Shaista goes into a deeper shock. Now Nayyara invites Muskaan and Shaista to come for Haya's marriage. They come. The show ends with Shaista hugging Haya, and Shaista remembers how she had told Nazir that she would not make Haya Zeeshan's wife. Shaista feels guilty.

== Cast ==
- Ayeza Khan as Haya Baseer
- Neelam Muneer as Muskaan Nazir
- Sanam Chaudhry as Iraj Nazir
- Madiha Rizvi as Fala Baseer
- Agha Ali as Zeeshan Nazir
- Humayun Ashraf as Danish
- Hassan Niazi as Ayaan
- Ahsan Balaj as Wahaj
- Tipu Sharif as Waleed Ahmed
- Rabia Noreen as Shaista Nazir
- Seemi Pasha as Naima
- Ismat Zaidi as Nayyara Baseer
- Minal Khan as Fariya Baseer
- Mehmood Akhtar as Baseer Hussain
- Mohsin Gillani as Nazir Hussain
- Imran Ashraf as Shehryar (Sherry)
- Nausheen Ahmed Hasan as Sabrina Zeeshan
- Mizna Waqas as Tabinda (Wahaj's sister)
- Ayesha Toor as Maria

== Soundtrack ==
Mere Meherbaan OST is sung by Rahat Fateh Ali Khan.

== Accolades ==
The drama received the following nominations at the 2015 Hum Awards:

Nominated work year	Date of ceremony	Award	Category	Recipient(s)	Result
2014	April 9, 2015	Hum Awards	Best Drama Serial Popular	Humayun Saeed; Shehzad Naseeb	Nominated
2014	April 9, 2015	Hum Awards	Best Actress Popular	Ayeza Khan	Nominated
