= Kahani Aik Raat Ki =

Pakistani television series

- Written by: Sarwat Nazir; Qaisra Hayat; Adeel Akhtar; Muhammad Asif
- Screenplay by: Nain Maniar
- Directed by: Nain Maniar
- Country of origin: Pakistan
- Original language: Urdu
- No. of episodes: 33

Production
- Producer: [Shehzad Agha]
- Running time: 52 minutes

Original release
- Network: ARY Digital
- Release: 24 February 2012 – 9 January 2013

Kahani Eik Raat Ki (Urdu: کہانی ایک رات کی, transl. Story Of One Night) is a Pakistani thriller anthology television series that was broadcast on ARY Digital during 2012–2013. The broadcast consisted mainly of short horror/romantic/thriller stories in a mini format. The show stars Neelam Muneer, Maria Wasti, Omair Rana, Sajal Aly, Ayeza Khan, Sonya Hussain, Noman Ejaz, Sana Fakhar, Aijaz Aslam, Sohai Ali Abro, and others. The series aired at 8 p.m. every Friday, from 24 February 2012 to 9 January 2013.

== List of episodes ==
Episode No.	Episode Name	Cast	Running Dates
1	Bojh	Jia Ali, Shahood Alvi	24 February 2012
2	Aane Wala Pal	Ayeza Khan, Kamran Jilani	
3	Dhakka	Ayeza Khan, Affan Waheed, Uzma Gillani	
4	Darr	Imran Aslam, Farhan Ali Agha, Faisal Rehman, Aijaz Aslam	
5	Pyar Ki Knot	Noman Ejaz, Neelam Muneer, Sana Fakhar	
6	Shab e Intezar	Behroze Sabzwari, Maria Wasti, Sajal Aly, Affan Waheed	
7	Main Qatil Nahin	Beenish Chohan, Sohai Ali Abro	
8	Khirki Taley	Natasha Ali, Kamran Jilani	
9	Woh Kaun Thi	Yasra Rizvi, Hassan Ahmed, Malik Raza	
10	Meeri Neelofar		
11	Dhundli Raat	Kashif Mehmood, Maria Wasti	
12	Sitamgar	Danish Taimoor, Ayeza Khan	
13	Panah	Akhtar Hasnain, Omair Rana	
14	Koi Teesra		
15	Aitbaar	Hassan Niazi, Sana Fakhar, Faisal Rehman	
16	Raat Ka Saamna		
17	Tasveer		
18	Bhaagi Hui Larki	Neelam Muneer, Imran Aslam	21 April 2013
19	Zard Patta	Sarah Khan, Noman Habib	
20	Badzaat		
21	Maili Chaddar	Behroze Sabzwari	
22	Dil Ka Kamra		
23	Daagh		
24	Lamha	Affan Waheed, Ayeza Khan	
25	Inteqaam		
