= Koi Chand Rakh =

2018 Pakistani television series

- Title screen
- Also known as: Koi Chand Rakh Meri Shaam Par
- Urdu: کوئی چاند رکھ
- Genre: Romantic drama
- Based on: Koi Chand Rakh Meri Sham Per by Nayab Jillani
- Written by: Maha Malik
- Directed by: Siraj-ul-Haque
- Starring: Imran Abbas; Ayeza Khan; Areeba Habib; Muneeb Butt
- Theme music composer: Shani Arshad
- Opening theme: "Koi Chand Rakh" by Rahat Fateh Ali Khan
- Country of origin: Pakistan
- Original language: Urdu
- No. of episodes: 28

Production
- Producer: Abdullah Seja
- Production location: Karachi
- Running time: 39 – 40 minutes

Original release
- Network: ARY Digital
- Release: July 19, 2018 – February 14, 2019

Koi Chand Rakh (Urdu: کوئی چاند رکھ, transl. Set The Moon) is a 2018 Pakistani television series that premiered on 19 July 2018 on ARY Digital. The last of its 28 episodes aired on 14 February 2019. It was written by Maha Malik and directed by Siraj-ul-Haque. It was created by Abdullah Seja of Idream Entertainment. It stars Ayeza Khan, Imran Abbas, Areeba Habib and Muneeb Butt in the lead.

The show was met with mixed to negative reception throughout its run, being criticised for its clichéd plot and poor characterisation, but was a rating success nonetheless.

== Plot ==
Dr. Rabail (Ayeza Khan) is a caring, young woman who was orphaned at five years old and was raised by her maternal uncle Asad Niazi and his wife Nafeesa. Asad and Nafeesa have a daughter, Nishaal (Areeba Habib) and a son Umair (Muneeb Butt). Though Rabail took care of Umair like an older sister, Umair developed feelings for her which horrifies Rabail when the same is revealed, as she had always seen him as a younger brother. Nafeesa overhears the conversation and decides that the best solution is to get Rabail married as soon as possible.

On the other hand is a parallel story of Zain (Imran Abbas), son of a wealthy businessman Ibrar. He is a carefree and shallow man obsessed with looks. He instantly falls in love with Nishaal's beauty and approaches her, leading to a misunderstanding making him mistakenly believe that Nishaal's name is Rabail. On numerous occasions he meets Nishaal, who initially ignores him but gradually starts liking him. Zain later discovers that the girl he loves is his father's friend Asad Niazi's daughter, and under the wrong impression agrees to his father's request for marrying Rabail. Meanwhile, Rabail under pressure from Nishaal tricks Umair into going to college with the false promise that she'll wait for him, while it's shown that the real plan Rabail, Nafeesa, and Nishaal had is to get Rabail married while he's away.

Nishaal finds out that the proposal for Rabail is from Zain. Both Zain and Nishaal are heartbroken after realisation, as they had fallen in love despite not having spent much time together. Nishaal tells Zain how she had come to see him as her "ideal" man, but Zain refuses to accept this as he's finally made his father proud of him with his decision to marry Rabail and doesn't want to spoil this new relationship with his father. Umair gets to learn about the betrayal too late at Rabail and Zain'sNikaah ceremony, resulting in him having a nervous breakdown.

Zain and Nishaal try to make each other jealous through manipulative games; Zain by pretending to have feelings for Rabail, and Nishaal by flirting with Zain's best friend, Zia. After getting married, Zain rudely deserts Rabail on the wedding night itself because he cannot bring himself to consummate. Zain and Nishaal discuss their relationship which is discovered by Zain's father, who suffers a heart attack but before dying makes Zain promise to never divorce Rabail. Zain agrees to fulfill Ibrar's last wish despite being in love with Nishaal.

After patching up with Zain, Nishaal completely ignores Zia, who hasn't given up his feelings for her. Zia gets revenge by getting engaged to Zain's sister, Sobia, (who he knew had a crush on him), and disappears on the wedding day. While Rabail makes Zia realize his mistake and helps them get married, Zain leaves Rabail to get Nikkahfied with Nishaal. As Zain sets up house with Nishaal, Rabail finds out she is pregnant, but she receives full support from Zain's mother, Gulshan., who tries her best to bring Rabail and Zain back together. Despite Nishaal's attempts to persuade Zain to divorce Rabail, he avoids this.

A year after Rabail gives birth to their daughter, Ujala, Zain realizes that he doesn't truly love Nishaal. He sees her for who she really is: a woman who knows nothing about love, family values and respects no one and he was never really happy with her because she is shallow. He has learned that beauty isn't everything and regret not valuing Rabail's moral and cultural values. When Zain tries to go back to Rabail, apologizing for everything he has done, the innocent Rabail has become cold-hearted. He finds out, too late, that it is not easy to forgive so easily when the wounds are deep. Meanwhile, when Gulshan dies, Zain is full of guilt and regret, and begs Rabail for forgiveness.

Nishaal returns, still furious with Zain, who has started having feelings for Rabail. After waiting for a whole day for Zain to come home she goes to his house, but is met with a slap from an unwelcoming Zain. In fury, she leaves a report which shows she's pregnant. Nishaal tries to commit suicide but having been followed is saved yet suffers the loss of her child. She initially tries to blame Rabail for her loss but discovers her friend actually saved her life.

Umair and Zain arrive at Rabail's house at the same time and before Zain leaves, come to a reluctant truce then part with Umair assuring Zain he will ask Rabail to forgive Zain. After refusing Zain's plea to return home, she accepts Umair's love. It ends Umair and Rabail enjoying the rain and Zain regretting he has no loved ones left.

== Cast ==
Actor	Character	Notes
Ayeza Khan	Dr. Rabail Zain	a Gynecologist, Zain's first wife
Imran Abbas	Zain Abrar	Rabail and Nishaal's husband
Areeba Habib	Nishaal Niazi Zain	Zain's second wife, Rabail's cousin
Muneeb Butt	Umair Niazi	Nishaal's brother, Rabail's cousin
Asma Abbas	Gulshan Abrar	Zain and Sobia's mother
Yasmin Huq	Sobia Abrar Majid	Zain's sister
Sabiha Sumar	Nafisa Niazi	Asad's wife, Nishal and Umair's mother
Hashim Butt	Asad Niazi	Nafisa's husband, Nishal and Umair's father and Rabail's uncle
Tanvir Jamal	Abrar	Zain and Sobia's father
Rana Majid	Zia	Zain's friend and Sobia's husband

== Soundtrack ==
Koi Chand Rakh – OST

Soundtrack album by Rahat Fateh Ali Khan
- Released: July 18, 2018
- Recorded: 2018
- Genre: Television soundtrack
- Length: (5:11)
- Language: Urdu
- Label: ARY Digital

Music video
- "Koi Chand Rakh" OST on YouTube

The title song was sung by Rahat Fateh Ali Khan. The music was composed by Shani Arshad and the lyrics were written by Sabir Zafar. It has more than 25 million views on YouTube.

== Production ==
The series was earlier titled Yeh Galat Fehmi Mere Naam Ke considering the title song of the series, but the makers changed it to Koi Chand Rakh.

== International broadcasts ==
Country	Network	Local title	Series premiere	Episodes
Somaliland	Horn Cable Television	Iftiinkii Noloshayda	18 August 2019	
United Arab Emirates	MBC Bollywood	أضيئي ليلي	2 May 2019	

== Awards and nominations ==
Year	Award	Category	Recipient(s)	Result	Ref.
2019	ARY Digital- Social Media Drama Awards 2018	Best Drama Serial -2018	Koi Chand Rakh	Nominated	
2019	ARY Digital- Social Media Drama Awards 2018	Best Actor Male (Serial)	Imran Abbas	Nominated	
2019	ARY Digital- Social Media Drama Awards 2018	Best Actor Female (Serial)	Ayeza Khan	Nominated	
2019	ARY Digital- Social Media Drama Awards 2018	Best Supporting Actor (Male)	Muneeb Butt	Won	
2019	ARY Digital- Social Media Drama Awards 2018	Best Newcomer (Female)	Areeba Habib	Won	
2019	ARY Digital- Social Media Drama Awards 2018	Best OST	Koi Chand Rakh	Nominated	
2019	ARY Digital- Social Media Drama Awards 2018	Best Director	Siraj ul Haq	Nominated	
2019	ARY Digital- Social Media Drama Awards 2018	Best Script Writer	Maha Malik	Nominated	
