= Pakistani dramas =

Pakistani television shows and dramas

Pakistani dramas, or Pakistani serials, are televised serials produced in Pakistan. Although most of the serials are produced in Urdu, an increasing number are produced in other Pakistani languages such as Sindhi, Pashto, Punjabi and Balochi. One of Pakistan's oldest television dramas is the Urdu serial Khuda Ki Basti, which aired in 1969. Pakistani dramas, like serials elsewhere, reflect the country's culture. According to critics, the decades of the 1970s and 1980s are considered to be the golden age of Pakistani serials.

In 2016, a Dawn News report estimated that the five major entertainment channels combined produce around 80 dramas every year, with an average of 16 dramas per channel. In 2025, it was estimated that Pakistan produced around 120 dramas per year.

They have helped to attract viewers nationwide to television. The serials are widely popular in South Asian countries, including Afghanistan, Bangladesh, India and Nepal.

== Origin ==
Many Pakistani dramas are based on Urdu novels. In the years following 1969, many authors, such as Umera Ahmad and Farhat Ishtiaq, became television writers. Both Umera and Farhat have written content for digests as well as television serials. In recent years, Pakistani dramas have increasingly begun to tackle social issues that are considered taboos.

== Social impact ==
Pakistani feminists are usually concerned about the depiction of women in Pakistani drama TV serials, they receive many of those with skepticism & reservation. UK based Pakistani feminist Tasneem Ahmar, whose research institute focuses on the women-media relationships, describes that the vast majority (~99.99%) of Pakistani TV dramas are misogynistic, patriarchal, and outmoded in their depiction and treatment of women's issues. Ahmar says that, while Pakistani Drama TV serials are doubtlessly popular and renowned by all strata of Pakistani society, they lamentably forgo their potential of doing better towards projecting progressive values rather than regressive portrayals of women & support to equal rights.

== Popularity outside Pakistan ==
=== Middle East ===
In 2013, the Pakistani drama Humsafar was dubbed into Arabic and broadcast by MBC in the Middle East as Rafeeq-Al-Rooh. The show was immediately successful and, after its first few episodes were broadcast, became the channel's most-watched drama. Before this, Pakistani dramas were not broadcast in the Middle East. After Humasafar, other shows such as Malaal (aired as Hob-Wa-Nadam), Zindagi Gulzar Hai (aired as Asrar Al Hob), Khaani, Aisi Hai Tanhai, Suno Chanda and several others were also dubbed into Arabic and broadcast by MBC.

=== India ===
Dramas such as Deewarein, Waris, and Jungle were popular in India during the 1980s: according to a 1988 India Today report which described it as an "invasion", Pakistani serials such as Tanhaiyan, Ankahi and Sona Chandi gained remarkable popularity in India, to the extent that demand for their video cassettes rivaled or even surpassed that of Hindi films in some regions. According to the report, video libraries across North India and Western India, with cities like Delhi, Mumbai, Lucknow, Jodhpur, Srinagar, and throughout Punjab widely stocked these Pakistani serials, with customers often returning repeatedly for the same titles. In Bombay, where all of the 3,000 video librairies stocked cassettes of Pakistani dramas as per the India Today report, their popularity was described as comparable to that of a major Bollywood release, such as Amitabh Bachchan films, offering Indian audiences a sense of nostalgia and a level of sophistication that critics argued was missing from contemporary Indian television. The phenomenon was partly attributed to the polished direction, strong acting, "technical perfection" and the emotional resonance these serials carried, evoking memories of pre-Partition cultural connections.

Eventually, the Indian government imposed a ban on Pakistani television channels in India. In 2009, the Senate of Pakistan's broadcasting division appealed to the Parliament of India to lift the ban. In 2012, India began debating whether to reverse the ban on Pakistani television channels. India assured Pakistan that it would consider a proposal by Pakistani foreign secretary Jalil Abbas Jilani to lift the ban.

Zee Entertainment Enterprises (ZEEL) launched an entertainment television channel, Zindagi, on 23 June 2014. The channel aired syndicated television shows from Pakistan, and has been well received. It has been criticized, however, for showing dramas with a smaller number of episodes. To appease viewers, the channel aired hundreds of Pakistani television shows since then including Aunn Zara, Humsafar, Pyarey Afzal, Zindagi Gulzar Hai and Meray Paas Tum Ho. Zindagi Gulzar Hai became so popular that it was re-run one month after it ended its initial run in India. In September 2016, however, Zindagi dropped all Pakistani shows from their line-up. In this way, Zindagi came to its end on television.

In July 2020, it was announced that Zindagi will make its comeback digitally and brand will come with its 5 original Web Series including Mrs. & Mr. Shameem, Abdullah Pur Ka Devdas, Churails, Ek Jhoothi Love Story and Dhoop Ki Deewar along with some old and new shows from Zindagi Library.

Some already broadcast television series and some of the recent years such as Diyar-e-Dil, Mera Naam Yousuf Hai, Mann Mayal, Baaghi, Behadd, O Rangreza, Ullu Baraye Farokht Nahi, Shehr-e-Zaat, Suno Chanda and many others started to premiere from July 2020 on ZEE5 with a premium membership.

Star India began airing of Mera Naam Yousuf Hai in 2015 on their channel Star Plus and thus becoming the channel's first ever Pakistani drama. The series was aired in India, UAE, USA, Ireland, UK, Austria, Europe, Canada and Latin America.

As per research study of Pakistani popular drama conducted by Indian scholar Jyoti Mehra, North Indian audience gets a sense of cultural familiarity which they can relate to while watching Pakistani drama. The study also gives credit to the content of Pakistani dramas for its comparative realism with fast pace, shorter duration and limited number of episodes for its acceptability among Indian audience.

=== Other countries ===
Pakistani dramas are shown in Afghanistan, Bangladesh, Nepal. Pakistani television shows are aired on cable television channels in the United Kingdom, Norway, United States, Canada, Turkey and Iran for the Pakistani diaspora.

== See also ==
- Cinema of Pakistan
- List of highest grossing Pakistani films
