= Urdu 1 =

Pakistani Urdu-language television network

Urdu 1 HD Pakistan
- Broadcast area: Global
- Headquarters: Dubai, UAE

Programming
- Picture format: South Asia: 1080i HDTV downscaled to 16:9 for the SDTV feeds. The South Asian subfeed is downscaled to letterboxed 4:3 576i); Global feeds: 1080p HDTV (downscaled to 4:3/16:9 576i for the SDTV feeds)

Ownership
- Owner: Alliance Media FZ LLC

History
- Launched: 23 June 2012; 14 years ago

Links
- Website: Urdu1.tv

Availability

Streaming media
- Urdu 1 on Sony Gateway: Watch Live

Urdu 1 (Urdu: اردو ۱) is an Urdu language entertainment channel based in Dubai, United Arab Emirates. It airs foreign dramas dubbed in Urdu.

== History ==
Urdu 1 was founded in 2012 to air foreign television shows dubbed in Urdu. It began test transmissions on 12 June 2012 and commenced regular broadcasting on 23 June 2012. It adapted international formats, such as MasterChef, for local audiences.
