= List of Coke Studio Pakistan episodes =

Coke Studio Pakistan is a Pakistani television series featuring live music performances. The program focuses on a fusion of the diverse musical influences in Pakistan, including eastern classical, folk, and contemporary popular music. Following is the list of its episodes released till date, along with the songs and singers in correspondence with the seasons and their respective episodes.

== Coke Studio Pakistan : Seasons Overview ==
| Series | Episodes | Originally released | |
| Series | Episodes | First released | Last released |
|---|---|---|---|
| 1 | 4 | 7 June 2008 | 4 August 2008 |
| 2 | 5 | 14 June 2009 | 14 August 2009 |
| Coke Studio Special | 3 | 1 February 2010 | 16 June 2010 |
| 3 | 5 | 1 June 2010 | 31 July 2010 |
| 4 | 5 | 22 May 2011 | 17 July 2011 |
| 5 | 5 | 13 May 2012 | 8 July 2012 |
| 6 | 5 | 27 October 2013 | 5 January 2014 |
| 7 | 7 | 21 September 2014 | 22 November 2014 |
| Special: Phir Se Game Utha Dain | | 29 January 2015 | |
| 8 | 7 | 16 August 2015 | 4 October 2015 |
| 9 | 7 | 13 August 2016 | 24 September 2016 |
| 10 | 7 | 11 August 2017 | 21 September 2017 |
| Coke Studio Explorer | 5 | 3 July 2018 | 11 July 2018 |
| 11 | 9 | 10 August 2018 | 19 October 2018 |
| Special: Hum Aik Hain | | 1 June 2019 | |
| 12 | 6 | 11 October 2019 | 29 November 2019 |
| Special: Ramadan | | 14 May 2020 | |
| 13 | 4 | 4 December 2020 | 25 December 2020 |
| Special: Pakistan Day Special | | 19 March 2021 | |
| Special: Cricket Khidaiye | | 24 October 2021 | |
| 14 | 4 | 14 January 2022 | 22 March 2022 |
| 15 | 4 | 14 April 2024 | 4 July 2024 |
| Coke Studio Nu.WAV | 6 | 13 September 2026 | 5 November 2026 |

== Coke Studio Pakistan : SEASONS ==
=== Season 1 (2008) : Produced by Rohail Hyatt ===
The first season of Coke Studio began on 7 June 2008 and ended on 4 August 2008. The show was produced by The Coca-Cola Company and Rohail Hyatt. The production team included Rohail Hyatt as the executive producer along with Umber Hyatt being the producer of the show. Natasha De Souza and Naseer-ud-din Wasif served as production team members.

Artists featuring in the show included, Rahat Fateh Ali Khan, Ali Azmat, Ali Zafar, Ustaad H. B Gullo, Saieen Tufail Ahmed, Strings, Sajid & Zeeshan, Saba & Selina and Mauj. The show also featured a house band which had some of the high-profile musicians in the country including, Omran Shafique on guitars, Kamran Zafar on bass guitars, Zeeshan Parwez on keyboards and turntables, Louis 'Gumby' Pinto on drums. Other members of the house band included, Saba Shabbir, Athar Sani and Selina Rashid on backing vocals along with Babar Khanna, Zulfiq 'Shazee' Ahmed Khan and The Abdul Latif Band on percussions.

The first episode aired on 8 June, followed by the second episode on 29 June. The third episode was aired on all locals channels on 20 July and the show came to an end on 4 August, which also rebroadcast three songs, "Sar Kiye" by Strings, "Garaj Baras" by Ali Azmat featuring Rahat Fateh Ali Khan and "Allah Hu" by Tufail Ahmed and Ali Zafar, from the previous episodes.

| No. Overall | # | Song(s) Title | Artist(s) | Language(s) | Original air date |
Episode 1
| 1 | 1 | Deewana | Ali Azmat | Urdu | 8 June 2008 |
| 1 | 2 | Garaj Baras | Ali Azmat & Rahat Fateh Ali Khan | Urdu | 8 June 2008 |
| 1 | 3 | Gallan | Ali Azmat | Punjabi | 8 June 2008 |
| 1 | 4 | Shaman Paiyan | Rahat Fateh Ali Khan | Punjabi | 8 June 2008 |
| 1 | 5 | Balama | Ali Azmat & Rahat Fateh Ali Khan | Punjabi & Urdu | 8 June 2008 |
| 1 | 6 | Paheliyan | Mauj | | 8 June 2008 |
Episode 2
| 2 | 7 | I'm in Love (I'm a Believer) | Saba and Selina | English | 29 June 2008 |
| 2 | 8 | Sar Kiye | Strings | Urdu | 29 June 2008 |
| 2 | 9 | Anjane | Strings | Urdu | 29 June 2008 |
| 2 | 10 | Duur | Strings, Hussain Bakhsh Gullo & House Band | Urdu | 29 June 2008 |
| 2 | 11 | Zinda | Strings | Urdu | 29 June 2008 |
| 2 | 12 | Jam Session | Hussain Bakhsh Gullo & House Band | | 29 June 2008 |
Episode 3
| 3 | 13 | Janay Na Koi | Ali Zafar | | 20 July 2008 |
| 3 | 14 | Chal Dil Meray | Ali Zafar | Urdu | 20 July 2008 |
| 3 | 15 | Channo | Ali Zafar | Urdu | 20 July 2008 |
| 3 | 16 | Rangeen | Ali Zafar | Urdu | 20 July 2008 |
| 3 | 17 | My Happiness | Sajid & Zeeshan | English | 20 July 2008 |
| 3 | 18 | Allah Hu | Ali Zafar & Tufail Ahmed | Urdu | 20 July 2008 |
Episode 4
| 4 | 19 | Percussion Jam | House Band | | 4 August 2008 |
| 4 | 20 | Dildara | Rahat Fateh Ali Khan | Punjabi | 4 August 2008 |
| 4 | 21 | Flute Jam | Various Artists | | 4 August 2008 |
| 4 | 22 | Mein Challa | Ali Azmat | Punjabi | 4 August 2008 |
| 4 | 23 | Garaj Baras | Ali Azmat & Rahat Fateh Ali Khan | Urdu | 4 August 2008 |
| 4 | 24 | Dhaani | Strings & Hussain Baskhsh Gullo | Urdu | 4 August 2008 |
| 4 | 25 | Sar Kiye | Strings | Urdu | 4 August 2008 |
| 4 | 26 | Allah Hu | Ali Zafar & Tufail Ahmed | Urdu | 4 August 2008 |

=== Season 2 (2009) - Produced by Rohail Hyatt ===
The second series of Coke Studio included notable differences from the first series, including the fact that the live audiences were excluded. The series also ran for longer, this time there were five episodes in total and in each episode there were five or more performances by the featuring artists. Rohail Hyatt returned as the executive producer along with Umber Hyatt as the producer of the show. This series also saw an increase in the number of musicians in the house band. The house band included, Asad Ahmed and Omran Shafique on guitars along with Kamran Zafar on bass guitars, two new members included Jaffar Zaidi on keyboards and Javed Iqbal on violin whereas Louis 'Gumby' Pinto returned on drums and on dholak was Sikander Inam. Other musicians included Natasha De Sousa and Saba Shabbir on backing vocals and on percussions were Babar Khanna, Waris 'Baloo' Ali and Zulfiq 'Shazee' Ahmed Khan.

This series also featured some well known guest musicians which included, sitar player Rakae Jamil, flutist Baqir Abbas, sarangi player Gul Mohammad, Gupreet Channa on tablas and Sadiq Sameer playing the rubab. Also, the second season featured Ali Zafar and Strings performing for the second time at Coke Studio as they were also part of the first season.

The second season began on 14 June 2009 and ended on the Independence Day of Pakistan, 14 August. Each episode was given an individual title and the titles per episode were; Individuality, Harmony, Equality, Spirit and Unity respectively.

| No. Overall | # | Song(s) Title | Artist(s) | Lyricist(s) | Language(s) | Original air date |
Episode 1 - Individuality
| 5 | 1 | Aik Alif | Saieen Zahoor & Noori | Bulleh Shah | Punjabi | 14 June 2009 |
| 5 | 2 | Aj Latha Naeeo | Javed Bashir | Nusrat Fateh Ali Khan | Punjabi | 14 June 2009 |
| 5 | 3 | Jal Pari | Atif Aslam | Atif Aslam | Urdu | 14 June 2009 |
| 5 | 4 | Khamaaj | Shafqat Amanat Ali Khan | Khamaj | Braj | 14 June 2009 |
| 5 | 5 | Paimona | Zeb and Haniya | Omar Khayyam | Persian | 14 June 2009 |
Episode 2 - Harmony
| 6 | 6 | Aankhon Kay Sagar | Shafqat Amanat Ali Khan | Shafqat Amanat Ali Khan | Punjabi | 28 June 2009 |
| 6 | 7 | Dastaan | Ali Zafar | Ali Zafar, Bulleh Shah | Punjabi | 28 June 2009 |
| 6 | 8 | Janay Do | Josh | Josh | Urdu | 28 June 2009 |
| 6 | 9 | Kinara | Atif Aslam & Riaz Ali Khan | Atif Aslam & Riaz Ali Khan | Punjabi & Urdu | 28 June 2009 |
| 6 | 10 | Toomba | Saieen Zahoor | Saieen Zahoor | Punjabi | 28 June 2009 |
Episode 3 - Equality
| 7 | 11 | Bari Barsi | Josh | Folk | Punjabi | 12 July 2009 |
| 7 | 12 | Chal Diyay | Zeb and Haniya & Javed Bashir | Haniya Aslam | Urdu | 12 July 2009 |
| 7 | 13 | Jo Meray | Noori | Noori | Urdu | 12 July 2009 |
| 7 | 14 | Wasta Pyar Da | Atif Aslam | Nusrat Fateh Ali Khan | Punjabi & Urdu | 12 July 2009 |
| 7 | 15 | Yaar Daddi | Ali Zafar | Ustaad Muhammad Juman | Seraiki | 12 July 2009 |
Episode 4 - Spirit
| 8 | 16 | Bulleya | Riaz Ali Khan | Folk | Punjabi | 26 July 2009 |
| 8 | 17 | Chup | Zeb and Haniya | Zeb and Haniya | Urdu | 26 July 2009 |
| 8 | 18 | Mahi Ve | Josh & Shafqat Amanat Ali Khan | Josh | Punjabi | 26 July 2009 |
| 8 | 19 | Mai Ne | Atif Aslam | Folk | Punjabi | 26 July 2009 |
| 8 | 20 | Saari Raat | Noori | Noori | Urdu | 26 July 2009 |
Episode 5 - Unity
| 9 | 21 | Humain Kya Hua | Atif Aslam | Atif Aslam | Urdu | 14 August 2009 |
| 9 | 22 | Husn-e-Haqiqi | Arieb Azhar | Khwaja Ghulam Farid | Punjabi & Urdu | 14 August 2009 |
| 9 | 23 | Kedaar | Noori | Noori | Urdu | 14 August 2009 |
| 9 | 24 | Kuch Ajab Khail | Shafqat Amanat Ali Khan | | Braj | 14 August 2009 |
| 9 | 25 | Nahi Ray Nahi | Ali Zafar | Ali Zafar | Urdu | 14 August 2009 |
| 9 | 26 | Rona Chor Dia | Zeb and Haniya & Javed Bashir | Zeb and Haniya | Urdu | 14 August 2009 |
| 9 | 27 | Titliyan | Strings | Strings | Urdu | 14 August 2009 |

=== Season 3 (2010) - Produced by Rohail Hyatt ===
Coke Studio returned for its third series on 1 June 2010. Rohail Hyatt continued as the executive producer along with Umber Hyatt as the producer of the show. The production team included Naseer-ud-din Wasif as the technical manager, Zeeshan Parwez assisted by Adnan Malik on video production, Danial Hyatt on visual and animations and Selina Rashid with her firm Lotus as public relations.

The third season also saw a change in the house band as Natasha De Souza was replaced by Sanam Saeed and Zoe Viccaji who joined Saba Shabbir on backing vocals. Sikander Mufti joined the crew on percussions with Babar Khanna and Zulfiq 'Shazee' Ahmed Khan. Asad Ahmed and Omran Shafique returned as guitarists along with Kamran Zafar on bass. Jaffar Ali Zaidi and Javed Iqbal stayed on keyboards and violin respectively whereas Gumby remained as the drummer of the show.

This series also featured some well-known guest musicians which included, flutist Baqir Abbas, Sagar Veena player Noor Zehra and Sadiq Sameer playing the rubab. Also, the third season featured a return of Noori, Zeb and Haniya and Arieb Azhar, who were also part of second season of the show. The third season featured five episodes which are titled as Reason, Will, Conception, Form and Realisation, respectively.

| No. Overall | # | Song(s) Title | Artist(s) | Lyricist(s) | Language(s) | Original air date |
Episode 1 - Reason
| 10 | 1 | Na Raindee Hai | Arieb Azhar | Bulleh Shah | Punjabi | 1 June 2010 |
| 10 | 2 | Ramooz-e-Ishq | Abida Parveen | Bedam Shah Warsi, Mir Dard & Iqbal | Punjabi | 1 June 2010 |
| 10 | 3 | Alif Allah | Arif Lohar ft. Meesha Shafi | Sultan Bahu | Punjabi | 1 June 2010 |
| 10 | 4 | Yaadein | Karavan | Karavan | Urdu | 1 June 2010 |
| 10 | 5 | Bibi Sanam | Zeb and Haniya | Folk | Persian | 1 June 2010 |
Episode 2 - Will
| 11 | 6 | Aisha | Amanat Ali | | Urdu | 17 June 2010 |
| 11 | 7 | Moomal Raano | Fakir Juman Shah | Shah Abdul Latif Bhittai | Sindhi | 17 June 2010 |
| 11 | 8 | Tan Dole | Noori ft. Zeb and Haniya | Noori | Urdu | 17 June 2010 |
| 11 | 9 | Bolo Bolo | Entity Paradigm | Sajjad Ali | Urdu | 17 June 2010 |
| 11 | 10 | Nainaan de Aakhe | Rizwan & Muazzam | Shah Hussain | Punjabi | 17 June 2010 |
Episode 3 - Conception
| 12 | 11 | Pritam | Sanam Marvi | Rajasthani Folk | Braj & Marwari | 4 July 2010 |
| 12 | 12 | Chori Chori | Meesha Shafi | Reshma | Punjabi | 4 July 2010 |
| 12 | 13 | Mori Araj Suno | Tina Sani ft. Arieb Azhar | Faiz Ahmad Faiz | Braj, Punjabi & Urdu | 4 July 2010 |
| 12 | 14 | Sultanat | Aunty Disco Project | Aunty Disco Project | Urdu | 4 July 2010 |
| 12 | 15 | Nigah-e-Darwaishan | Abida Parveen | Bulleh Shah, Seemab Akbarabadi & Sultan Bahu | Punjabi & Urdu | 4 July 2010 |
Episode 4 - Form
| 13 | 16 | Hor Vi Neevan Ho | Noori | Shah Hussain | Punjabi | 14 July 2010 |
| 13 | 17 | Kaisay Mumkin Hai | Karavan | Karavan | Urdu | 14 July 2010 |
| 13 | 18 | Nazaar Eyle | Zeb and Haniya | Folk | Turkish | 14 July 2010 |
| 13 | 19 | Haq Maujood | Sanam Marvi ft. Amanat Ali | Bulleh Shah, Khwaja Ghulam Farid, Sachal Sarmast & Shah Hussain | Persian, Punjabi & Siraiki | 14 July 2010 |
| 13 | 20 | Mirza Saahibaan | Arif Lohar | Folk | Punjabi | 14 July 2010 |
Episode 5 - Realisation
| 14 | 21 | Ay Watan ke Sajeele Jawaano | Amanat Ali | Jamiluddin Aali | Urdu | 31 July 2010 |
| 14 | 22 | Soz-e-Ishq | Abida Parveen | Bulleh Shah, Kabir & Sultan Bahu | Braj, Punjabi & Urdu | 31 July 2010 |
| 14 | 23 | Jana Jogi De Naal | Zeb and Haniya & Rizwan and Muazzam | Bulleh Shah | Punjabi | 31 July 2010 |
| 14 | 24 | Nawai Ney | Tina Sani | Maulana Rumi | Urdu | 31 July 2010 |
| 14 | 25 | Manzil-e-Sufi | Sanam Marvi | Sachal Sarmast | Siraiki | 31 July 2010 |

=== Season 4 (2011) - Produced by Rohail Hyatt ===
| No. overall | Song Title | Artist(s) | Lyricist(s) | Language(s) | Original release date |
|---|---|---|---|---|---|
Episode 1
| 15 | "Daanah Pah Daanah" | Akhtar Chanal Zahri & Komal Rizvi | Akhtar Chanal Zahri | Brahui, Balochi, Persian, Punjabi & Urdu | May 19, 2011 |
| 15 | "Ik Aarzu" | Jal | Goher Mumtaz & Bulleh Shah | Punjabi & Urdu | May 19, 2011 |
| 15 | "Kuch Hai" | Mizraab | Adnan Ahmed | Urdu | May 19, 2011 |
| 15 | "Sighṛa Aaween" | Sanam Marvi | Sachal Sarmast & Sultan Bahu | Punjabi & Siraiki | May 19, 2011 |
| 15 | "To Kia Hua" | Bilal Khan | Bilal Khan | Urdu | May 19, 2011 |
Episode 2
| 16 | "Kangna" | Fareed Ayaz & Abu Muhammad | Mirza Qateel & Bedam Shah Warsi | Braj & Persian | June 1, 2011 |
| 16 | "Kirkir Kirkir" | Sajjad Ali | Sajjad Ali | Punjabi | June 1, 2011 |
| 16 | "Ni Oothan Waale" | Attaullah Khan Esakhelvi | Bari Nizami | Punjabi & Siraiki | June 1, 2011 |
| 16 | "Nindiya Re" | Kaavish | Jaffer Ali Zaidi | Urdu | June 1, 2011 |
| 16 | "Senraan Ra Baairya" | Asif Hussain Samraat & Zoe Viccaji | Rajasthani Folk | Marwari | June 1, 2011 |
Episode 3
| 17 | "Baageshri" | Mole | - | Instrumental | June 17, 2011 |
| 17 | "Lamha" | Bilal Khan | Bilal Khan | Urdu | June 17, 2011 |
| 17 | "Ith Naheen" | Sanam Marvi | Sachal Sarmast | Urdu & Siraiki | June 17, 2011 |
| 17 | "Panchi" | Jal & Quratulain Balouch | Goher Mumtaz | Urdu & Punjabi | June 17, 2011 |
| 17 | "Mundari" | Ustaad Naseer-ud-Din Saami | Folk | Braj | June 17, 2011 |
Episode 4
| 18 | "Mandh" | The Sketches | Shah Latif | Sindhi | July 1, 2011 |
| 18 | "Pyaar Naal" | Attaullah Khan Esakhelvi | Afzal Aajiz | Urdu & Siraiki | July 1, 2011 |
| 18 | "Nar Bait" | Akhtar Chanal Zahri | Ustaad Ishaq Soz & Sherzaad | Brahui & Balochi | July 1, 2011 |
| 18 | "Lambi Judaai" | Komal Rizvi | Anand Bakshi | Urdu | July 1, 2011 |
| 18 | "Rang Laaga" | Sajjad Ali & Sanam Marvi | Amir Khusrau, Ali Moeen & Sajjad Ali | Braj & Punjabi | July 1, 2011 |
Episode 5
| 19 | "Beero Binjaaro" | Asif Hussain Samraat | Rajasthani Folk | Marwari | July 15, 2011 |
| 19 | "Mori Bangri" | Fareed Ayaz & Abu Muhammad | Folk | Braj | July 15, 2011 |

=== Season 5 (2012) - Produced by Rohail Hyatt ===
| No. overall | Song Title | Artist(s) | Lyricist(s) | Language(s) | Original release date |
|---|---|---|---|---|---|
Episode 1
| 20 | "Paisay Da Nasha" | Bohemia | Bohemia | Punjabi | May 13, 2012 |
| 20 | "Tum Kaho" | Symt | Haroon Shahid | Urdu | May 13, 2012 |
| 20 | "Kamlee" | Hadiqa Kiani | Bulleh Shah | Punjabi | May 13, 2012 |
| 20 | "Larsha Pekhawar Ta" | Hamayoon Khan | Pastho folk | Pashto | May 13, 2012 |
| 20 | "Charkha Nolakha" | Atif Aslam & Qayaas | Nusrat Fateh Ali Khan | Punjabi | May 13, 2012 |
Episode 2
| 21 | "Khabaram Raseeda" | Fareed Ayaz & Abu Muhammad | Amir Khusrau | Urdu & Persian | May 26, 2012 |
| 21 | "Larho Mujhey" | Bilal Khan | Bilal Khan | Urdu | May 26, 2012 |
| 21 | "Rabba Sacheya" | Atif Aslam | Faiz Ahmad Faiz & Khwaja Ghulam Farid | Punjabi | May 26, 2012 |
| 21 | "Pere Pavandi Saan" | Tahir Mithu | Shah Abdul Latif Bhittai | Sindhi | May 26, 2012 |
| 21 | "Ishq Aap Bhe Awalla" | Chakwal Group & Meesha Shafi | Sufi Poetry | Punjabi | May 26, 2012 |
Episode 3
| 22 | "Nindiya Ke Paar" | Uzair Jaswal | Yasir Jaswal | Braj, Punjabi & Urdu | June 24, 2012 |
| 22 | "Rung" | Hadiqa Kiani | Amir Khusrau | Braj | June 24, 2012 |
| 22 | "Neray Aah" | Overload & Rachel Viccaji | - | Punjabi | June 24, 2012 |
| 22 | "School Di Kitaab" | Bohemia | Bohemia | Punjabi | June 24, 2012 |
| 22 | "Taaray" | Bilal Khan | Bilal Khan | Urdu | June 24, 2012 |
Episode 4
| 23 | "Tora Bahraam Khaana" | Hamayoon Khan | Pastho folk | Pashto | July 8, 2012 |
| 23 | "Rung" | Fareed Ayaz & Abu Muhammad | Amir Khusrau | Braj | July 8, 2012 |
| 23 | "Bolay" | Uzair Jaswal | Uzair Jaswal | Urdu | July 8, 2012 |
| 23 | "Kandyaari Dhol Geet" | Bohemia & Chakwal Group | Aziz Lohar | Punjabi | July 8, 2012 |
| 23 | "Dholna" | Atif Aslam | Atif Aslam & Nusrat Fateh Ali Khan | Braj, Punjabi & Urdu | July 8, 2012 |
Episode 5
| 24 | "Koi Labda" | Sanam Marvi & Symt | Haroon Shahid, Hasan Omer & Nusrat Fateh Ali Khan | Punjabi | July 15, 2012 |
| 24 | "Wah Wah Jhulara" | Chakwal Group | Folk | Punjabi | July 15, 2012 |
| 24 | "Dasht-E-Tanhai" | Meesha Shafi | Faiz Ahmad Faiz | Urdu | July 15, 2012 |
| 24 | "Mahi" | Overload | Overload | Punjabi | July 15, 2012 |
| 24 | "Seher" | Farhan Rais Khan | - | Instrumental | July 15, 2012 |

=== Season 6 (2013) - Produced by Rohail Hyatt ===
| No. overall | Song Title | Artist(s) | Lyricist(s) | Language(s) | Original release date |
|---|---|---|---|---|---|
Season Openers
| 25 | "Jogi" | Muazzam Ali Khan & Fariha Pervez | Bulleh Shah | Punjabi | 20 October 2013 |
| 25 | "Laili Jaan" | Zeb and Haniya | Ahmad Zahir | Persian | 24 October 2013 |
Episode 1
| 26 | "Khayaal" | Umair Jaswal | Umair Jaswal | Urdu | 26 October 2013 |
| 26 | "Babu Bhai" | Ali Azmat | Yawar Mian | Urdu | 26 October 2013 |
| 26 | "Rabba Ho" | Saieen Zahoor & Sanam Marvi | Sachchal Sarmast & Shah Latif Bhitai | Punjabi & Persian | 26 October 2013 |
Episode 2
| 27 | "Laage Re Nain" | Ayesha Omer | Raga | Poorbi | 23 November 2013 |
| 27 | "Tori Chab / Abhogi" | Rustam Fateh Ali Khan & Sumru Ağıryürüyen | Raga | Braj & Turkish | 23 November 2013 |
| 27 | "Ishq Di Booti" | Abrar-ul-Haq | Abrar-ul-Haq | Punjabi | 23 November 2013 |
Episode 3
| 28 | "Neer Bharan" | Zara Madani & Muazzam Ali Khan | Raga | Braj | 7 December 2013 |
| 28 | "Channa" | Atif Aslam | Raga | Punjabi | 7 December 2013 |
| 28 | "Yaar Vekho" | Sanam Marvi | Sultan Bahu & Sachchal Sarmast | Punjabi | 7 December 2013 |
| 28 | "Raat Gaey" | Zoe Viccaji | Sabir Zafar | Urdu | 7 December 2013 |
Episode 4
| 29 | "Aamay Bhashalli Rey" | Alamgir & Fariha Pervez | Bengali Folk | Bengali & Braj | 21 December 2013 |
| 29 | "Laila O Laila" | Rostam Mirlashari | Balochi Folk | Balochi | 21 December 2013 |
| 29 | "Ishq Kinara" | Sumru Ağıryürüyen & Zoe Viccaji | Sabir Zafar | Turkish & Urdu | 21 December 2013 |
| 29 | "Mahi Gal" | Asad Abbas & Fariha Pervez | Sufi Folk | Persian & Punjabi | 21 December 2013 |
Episode 5
| 30 | "Miyan Ki Malhaar" | Ayesha Omer, Fariha Pervez & Zara Madani | Raga | Braj | 5 January 2014 |
| 30 | "Moray Naina" | Zara Madani | Javed Ali Khan | Braj | 5 January 2014 |
| 30 | "Sawaal – Kande Utte" | Muazzam Mujahid Ali Khan & Ali Azmat | Bulleh Shah & Waris Shah | Punjabi & Urdu | 5 January 2014 |
| 30 | "Allah Hu" | Abrar-ul-Haq & Saieen Zahoor | Khatir Afridi & Rahim Ghamzada | Punjabi | 5 January 2014 |

=== Season 7 (2014) - Produced by Strings ===
| No. overall | Song Title | Artist(s) | Language(s) | Original release date |
|---|---|---|---|---|
Episode 1
| 30 | "Sab Aakho Ali Ali" | Asrar | Punjabi | September 20, 2014 |
| 30 | "Tum Naraz Ho" | Sajjad Ali | Urdu | September 20, 2014 |
| 30 | "Lai Beqadaraan Naal Yaari" | Niazi Brothers | Punjabi | September 20, 2014 |
| 30 | "Mein Sufi Hoon" | Abida Parveen & Ustad Raees Khan | Braj, Punjabi & Urdu | September 20, 2014 |
Episode 2
| 31 | "Washmallay" | Akhtar Chanal Zahri, Komal Rizvi & Momin Durrani | Balochi & Brahui | September 27, 2014 |
| 31 | "Phool Banro" | Abbas Ali Khan & Humira Channa | Marwari | September 27, 2014 |
| 31 | "Chehra" | Zohaib Hassan | Urdu | September 27, 2014 |
| 31 | "Charkha" | Javed Bashir | Punjabi | September 27, 2014 |
Episode 3
| 32 | "Jhoolay Laal" | Fariha Pervez & Sajjad Ali | Punjabi | October 4, 2014 |
| 32 | "Sunn Ve Balori" | Meesha Shafi | Punjabi | October 4, 2014 |
| 32 | "Nadiya" | Jimmy Khan & Rahma Ali | Urdu | October 4, 2014 |
| 32 | "Dost" | Abida Parveen | N/A | October 4, 2014 |
Episode 4
| 33 | "Shakar Wandaan Re" | Asrar | Punjabi | October 11, 2014 |
| 33 | "Ambwa Talay" | Humaira Channa & Javed Bashir | Braj | October 11, 2014 |
| 33 | "Dheeray Dheeray" | Zohaib Hassan | Urdu | October 11, 2014 |
| 33 | "Bone Shaker" | Usman Riaz | Instrumental | October 11, 2014 |
Episode 5
| 34 | "Mujhay Baar Baar" | Abbas Ali Khan | Urdu | October 18, 2014 |
| 34 | "Pehla Pyar" | Jimmy Khan | Urdu | October 18, 2014 |
| 34 | "Mitti Da Pehlwan" | Jawad Ahmad | Punjabi | October 18, 2014 |
| 34 | "Kheryaan De Naal" | Niazi Brothers | Punjabi | October 18, 2014 |
Episode 6
| 35 | "Yaad" | Javed Bashir | Siraiki | November 15, 2014 |
| 35 | "Chaap Tilak" | Abida Parveen & Rahat Fateh Ali Khan | Braj | November 15, 2014 |
| 35 | "Jaana" | Zohaib Hassan & Zoe Viccaji | Urdu | November 15, 2014 |
| 35 | "Descent to the Ocean Floor" | Usman Riaz | Instrumental | November 15, 2014 |
Episode 7
| 36 | "Suth Gaana" | Sajjad Ali | Punjabi | November 22, 2014 |
| 36 | "Pani Da Bulbula" | Abrar-ul-Haq | Punjabi | November 22, 2014 |
| 36 | "Za Sta Pashan Na Yam" | Naseer And Shahab | Pashto | November 22, 2014 |
| 36 | "Hans Dhuni" | Ustad Raees Khan | Instrumental | November 22, 2014 |

=== Season 8 (2015) - Produced by Strings ===
| No. overall | Song Title | Artist(s) | Language(s) | Original release date |
|---|---|---|---|---|
Season Opener
| - | "Sohni Dharti" | Season's Vocalists | Urdu | 4 August 2015 |
Episode 1
| 37 | "Aankharli Pharookai" | Karam Abbas & Mai Dhai | Braj, Marwari & Punjabi | 16 August 2015 |
| 37 | "Bewajah" | Nabeel Shaukat Ali | Urdu | 16 August 2015 |
| 37 | "Sayon" | Mekaal Hasan Band | Punjabi | 16 August 2015 |
| 37 | "Tajdar-e-Haram" | Atif Aslam | Arabic, Braj, Persian & Urdu | 16 August 2015 |
Episode 2
| 38 | "Sakal Ban" | Rizwan & Muazzam Ali Khan | Braj | 22 August 2015 |
| 38 | "Sammi Meri Waar" | Qurat-ul-Ain Balouch & Umair Jaswal | Punjabi & Urdu | 22 August 2015 |
| 38 | "Chiryan da Chamba" | Suraiya Khanum & Anwar Maqsood | Punjabi & Urdu | 22 August 2015 |
| 38 | "Rockstar" | Ali Zafar | English, Punjabi & Urdu | 22 August 2015 |
Episode 3
| 39 | "Man Aamadeh Am" | Atif Aslam & Gul Panra | Persian & Urdu | 29 August 2015 |
| 39 | "Umran Langiyaan" | Ali Sethi & Nabeel Shaukat Ali | Siraiki & Punjabi | 29 August 2015 |
| 39 | "Neun La Leya" | Kaavish | Punjabi | 29 August 2015 |
| 39 | "Rung Jindri" | Arif Lohar | Punjabi | 29 August 2015 |
Episode 4
| 40 | "Rabba Ho" | Mulazim Hussain | Punjabi & Urdu | 5 September 2015 |
| 40 | "Khari Neem" | Siege | Marwari & Urdu | 5 September 2015 |
| 40 | "Piya Dehkan Ko" | Nafees Ahmed Khan & Ustad Hamid Ali Khan | Braj | 5 September 2015 |
| 40 | "Ae Dil" | Ali Zafar & Sara Haider | English & Urdu | 5 September 2015 |
Episode 5
| 41 | "Hina Ki Khushbu" | Asim Azhar & Samra Khan | Punjabi & Urdu | 13 September 2015 |
| 41 | "Khalis Makhan" | Bakhshi Brothers | Punjabi | 13 September 2015 |
| 41 | "Kinaray" | Mekaal Hasan Band | Urdu | 13 September 2015 |
| 41 | "Rangeela" | Ali Azmat | Urdu | 13 September 2015 |
Episode 6
| 42 | "Ve Baneya" | Fizza Javed & Mulazim | Punjabi & Urdu | 19 September 2015 |
| 42 | "Hare Hare Baans" | Rizwan, Muazzam & Shazia Manzoor | Awadhi | 19 September 2015 |
| 42 | "Jiya Karay" | Sara Raza & Ali Haider | Urdu | 19 September 2015 |
| 42 | "Kadi Aao N" | Atif Aslam & Mai Dhai | Punjabi & Urdu | 19 September 2015 |
Episode 7
| 43 | "Armaan" | Alycia Dias & Siege | Urdu | 3 October 2015 |
| 43 | "Ajj Din Vehre Vich" | Ali Zafar | Punjabi & Urdu | 3 October 2015 |
| 43 | "Dil Jale" | Malang Party | Urdu | 3 October 2015 |
| 43 | "Aaj Jaane Ki Zid Na Karo" | Farida Khanum | Urdu | 3 October 2015 |

=== Season 9 (2016) ===
| No. overall | Title | Artists(s) | Music Director | Lyricist(s) | Language(s) | Original release date |
|---|---|---|---|---|---|---|
Season Opener
| - | "Zalima Coca Cola Pila De" | Meesha Shafi & Umair Jaswal | Meesha Shafi & Umair Jaswal | Khawaja Pervaiz | Urdu | August 3, 2016 |
| - | "Aye Rah-E-Haq Ke Shaheedo" | Season's Vocalists | Strings | Mushir Kazmi | Urdu | August 5, 2016 |
Episode 1
| 45 | "Sasu Mangay" | Naseebo Lal & Umair Jaswal | Shiraz Uppal | Traditional Indian & Shakeel Sohail | Marwari & Punjabi | August 12, 2016 |
| 45 | "Janay Na Tu" | Ali Khan | Jaffer Zaidi | Ali Khan | Urdu | August 12, 2016 |
| 45 | "Aja Re Moray Saiyaan" | Noori & Zeb Bangash | Noori | Zehra Nigah | Urdu | August 12, 2016 |
| 45 | "Aaqa" | Abida Parveen & Ali Sethi | Shuja Haider | Khalid Mehmood Khalid, Salman Azmi & Waqas Siddiqui | Persian & Urdu | August 12, 2016 |
Episode 2
| 46 | "Bholay Bhalay" | Meesha Shafi | Shani Arshad | Sabir Zafar | Urdu | August 19, 2016 |
| 46 | "Afreen Afreen" | Momina Mustehsan & Rahat Fateh Ali Khan | Faakhir Mehmood | F K Khalish & Javed Akhtar | Urdu | August 19, 2016 |
| 46 | "Baliye (Laung Gawacha)" | Haroon Shahid & Quratulain Balouch | Noori | Haroon Shahid & Khawaja Pervaiz | Punjabi & Urdu | August 19, 2016 |
| 46 | "Man Kunto Maula" | Ali Azmat & Javed Bashir | Jaffer Zaidi | Amir Khusrau & Sabir Zafar | Arabic & Urdu | August 19, 2016 |
Episode 3
| 47 | "Khaki Banda" | Ahmed Jahanzeb & Umair Jaswal | Shuja Haider | Bulleh Shah & Shuja Haider | Punjabi & Urdu | August 26, 2016 |
| 47 | "Dilruba Na Raazi" | Faakhir Mehmood & Zeb Bangash | Faakhir Mehmood | Sabir Zafar & Zaland Khan Mohammadzai | Pashto & Urdu | August 26, 2016 |
| 47 | "Tu Hi Tu" | Mehwish Hayat & Shiraz Uppal | Shiraz Uppal | Shakeel Sohail | Urdu | August 26, 2016 |
| 47 | "Maula-i Kull" | Abida Parveen | Shani Arshad | Lal Shahbaz Qalandar & Sabir Zafar | Persian & Urdu | August 26, 2016 |
Episode 4
| 48 | "Uddi Ja" | Mohsin Abbas Haider | Jaffer Zaidi | Mohsin Abbas Haider | Punjabi | September 2, 2016 |
| 48 | "Aaya Laariye" | Meesha Shafi & Naeem Abbas Rufi | Shuja Haider | Traditional Folk & Saeed Gilani | Punjabi | September 2, 2016 |
| 48 | "Paar Chanaa De" | Shilpa Rao & Noori | Noori | Traditional Folk | Punjabi | September 2, 2016 |
| 48 | "Ala Baali" | Jabar Abbas & Nirmal Roy | Shiraz Uppal | Shakeel Sohail | Arabic, Persian & Urdu | September 2, 2016 |
Episode 5
| 49 | "Main Raasta" | Junaid Khan & Momina Mustehsan | Noori | Junaid Khan & Momina Mustehsan | Urdu | September 9, 2016 |
| 49 | "Shamaan Pai Gaiyaan/Kee Dam Da Bharosa" | Kashif Ali & Rachel Viccaji | Shiraz Uppal | Abdhulah Chili & Saeed Gilani | Punjabi | September 9, 2016 |
| 49 | "Sadaa" | Rahat Fateh Ali Khan | Shani Arshad | Javed Ali Khan | Punjabi | September 9, 2016 |
| 49 | "Jhalliya" | Javed Bashir, Masuma Anwar & Shahzad Nawaz | Faakhir Mehmood | Bulleh Shah, Waris Shah, Sabir Zafar & Javed Bashir | Braj, Punjabi & Urdu | September 9, 2016 |
Episode 6
| 50 | "Meri Meri" | Rizwan Butt & Sara Haider | Shani Arshad | Bulleh Shah | Punjabi | September 16, 2016 |
| 50 | "Tera Woh Pyar (Nawazishein Karam)" | Asim Azhar & Momina Mustehsan | Shuja Haider | Naqash Hyder | Urdu | September 16, 2016 |
| 50 | "Anokha Laaḍla" | Basit Ali & Damia Farooq | Faakhir Mehmood | Asad Muhammad Khan | Braj | September 16, 2016 |
| 50 | "Lagi Bina / Chal Mele Noon Challiye" | Saieen Zahoor & Sanam Marvi | Jaffer Zaidi | Waris Shah | Braj & Punjabi | September 16, 2016 |
Episode Season Finale
| 51 | "Sab Jag Soye" | Shuja Haider & Quratulain Balouch | Shuja Haider | Musheer Kazmi, Farhan Saeed, Momina Mustehsan & Saad Sultan | Punjabi & Urdu | September 23, 2016 |
| 51 | "Tu Kuja Man Kuja" | Rafaqat Ali Khan & Shiraz Uppal | Shiraz Uppal | Muzaffar Warsi | Urdu | September 23, 2016 |
| 51 | "Nimma Nimma" | Shani Arshad | Shani Arshad | Sabir Zafar | Urdu | September 23, 2016 |
| 51 | "O Re" | Noori | Noori | Traditional Folk & Sabir Zafar | Urdu | September 23, 2016 |
| 51 | "Dil Kamla" | Natasha Khan & Faakhir Mehmood | Faakhir Mehmood | Noori | Punjabi | September 23, 2016 |
| 51 | "Rang" | Amjad Sabri & Rahat Fateh Ali Khan | Shani Arshad | Amir Khusrau | Braj, Punjabi & Urdu | September 23, 2016 |

=== Season 10 (2017) ===
| No. overall | Song Title | Artist(s) | Lyricist(s) | Music Director | Original release date |
|---|---|---|---|---|---|
Season Opener
| - | "The National Anthem of Pakistan" | Season's Vocalists | Hafeez Jalandhari | Strings | August 4, 2017 |
Episode 1
| 52 | "Allahu Akbar" | Ahmed Jahanzeb & Shafqat Amanat Ali Khan | Salman Azmi & Shuja Haider | Shuja Haider | August 11, 2017 |
| 52 | "Chaa Rahi Kaali Ghata" | Amanat Ali & Hina Nasrullah | Traditional & Asim Raza | Sahir Ali Bagga | August 11, 2017 |
| 52 | "Muntazir" | Danyal Zafar & Momina Mustehsan | Strings | Strings | August 11, 2017 |
| 52 | "Ranjish Hi Sahi" | Ali Sethi | Ahmad Faraz & Talib Baghpati | Jaffer Zaidi | August 11, 2017 |
Episode 2
| 53 | "Tinak Dhin" | Ali Hamza, Ali Sethi & Waqar Ehsin | Ali Hamza | Ali Hamza | August 18, 2017 |
| 53 | "Sayonee" | Ali Noor, Junoon & Rahat Fateh Ali Khan | Sabir Zafar & Shah Hussain | Sahir Ali Bagga | August 18, 2017 |
| 53 | "Faasle" | Kaavish & Quratulain Balouch | Jaffer Zaidi | Jaffer Zaidi | August 18, 2017 |
| 53 | "Jaan-e-Bahaaraan" | Ali Zafar | Tanveer Naqvi | Shuja Haider | August 18, 2017 |
Episode 3
| 54 | "Laal Meri Pat" | Akbar Ali, Arieb Azhar & Quratulain Balouch | Traditional folk | Strings | August 25, 2017 |
| 54 | "Ronay Na Diya" | Sajjad Ali & Zaw Ali | Sudarshan Faakir | Sajjad Ali | August 25, 2017 |
| 54 | "Baazi" | Aima Baig & Sahir Ali Bagga | Traditional folk & Asim Raza | Sahir Ali Bagga | August 25, 2017 |
| 54 | "Mujhse Pehli Si Mohabbat" | Humaira Channa & Nabeel Shaukat Ali | Faiz Ahmad Faiz | Meekal Hassan | August 25, 2017 |
Episode 4
| 55 | "Naina Moray" | Aamir Zaki, Akbar Ali & Javed Bashir | Traditional & Shah Hussain | Jaffer Zaidi | September 1, 2017 |
| 55 | "Dekh Tera Kya/Latthay Di Chaadar" | Farhan Saeed & Quratulain Balouch | Bashir Manzar & Muhammad Nasir | Shani Arshad | September 1, 2017 |
| 55 | "Julie" | Ali Zafar & Danyal Zafar | Ali Zafar | Shani Arshad | September 1, 2017 |
| 55 | "Jindjaani" | Ali Hamza & Nirmal Roy | Baba Alam Siyahposh & Shakeel Sohail | Ali Hamza | September 1, 2017 |
Episode 5
| 56 | "Sab Maya Hai" | Attaullah Khan Esakhelvi & Sanwal Esakhelvi | Ibn-e-Insha, Farooq Rokhṛi, Mazhar Niazi, Shakir Shuja Abadi & Shuja Haider | Shuja Haider | September 8, 2017 |
| 56 | "Rangrez" | Rahat Fateh Ali Khan | Sajid Gul | Sahir Ali Bagga | September 8, 2017 |
| 56 | "Ujaalon Mein" | Faiza Mujahid & Faraz Anwar | Faraz Anwar | Jaffer Zaidi | September 8, 2017 |
| 56 | "Bol" | Shafqat Amanat Ali Khan | Faiz Ahmad Faiz | Shani Arshad | September 8, 2017 |
Episode 6
| 57 | "Dam Mast Qalandar" | Jabar Abbas & Umair Jaswal | Bari Nizami | Shuja Haider | September 15, 2017 |
| 57 | "Yo Soch" | Ali Zafar & Natasha Khan | Natasha Khan & Sabir Zafar | Strings | September 15, 2017 |
| 57 | "Kaatay Na Katay" | Aima Baig, Humera Arshad & Rachel Viccaji | Ali Hamza & Saifuddin Saif | Ali Hamza | September 15, 2017 |
| 57 | "Ghoom Taana" | Irteassh & Momina Mustehsan | Sabir Zafar & Salman Ahmad | Salman Ahmad | September 15, 2017 |
Episode 7
| 58 | "Tera Naam" | Sajjad Ali | Sajjad Ali | Sajjad Ali | September 21, 2017 |
| 58 | "Baanware" | Aima Baig & Shuja Haider | Shuja Haider & Syed Raza Tirmizi | Shuja Haider | September 21, 2017 |
| 58 | "Maula Tera Noor" | Shafqat Amanat Ali Khan | Sabir Zafar | Shani Arshad | September 21, 2017 |
| 58 | "Us Rah Par" | Ali Hamza, Ali Zafar & Strings | Shoaib Mansoor | Jaffer Zaidi | September 21, 2017 |

=== Season 11 (2018) ===
| No. overall | Title | Artists(s) | Composer(s) | Lyricist(s) | Language(s) | Original release date |
|---|---|---|---|---|---|---|
Season Opener
| - | "Hum Dekhenge" | Season's Vocalists | Asrar | Faiz Ahmad Faiz | Urdu | July 22, 2018 |
Episode 1: Naaz
| 59 | "Shikwa / Jawab-e-Shikwa" | Natasha Baig, Fareed Ayaz, Abu Muhammad Qawwal & Brothers | Munshi Raziuddin | Allama Iqbal, Amjad Hyderabadi & Omar Khayyam | Farsi & Urdu | August 10, 2018 |
| 59 | "Baalkada" | Lucky, Naghma & Jimmy Khan | Lucky, Naghma & Jimmy Khan | Lucky, Naghma & Jimmy Khan | Punjabi | August 10, 2018 |
| 59 | "Rap Hai Saara" | Young Desi & Lyari Underground | Mufassir Sabir, Abdul Wahab Khan, Abdul Ahad & Abdullah | Mufassir Sabir, Abdul Wahab Khan, Abdul Ahad & Abdullah | Balochi, English & Urdu | August 10, 2018 |
| 59 | "Main Irada" | Haniya Aslam, Rachel Viccaji, Shamu Bai, Ariana & Amrina | Haniya Aslam | Bilal Sami, Haniya Aslam, Kabir & Traditional Folk | Hindavi, Kailasha & Urdu | August 10, 2018 |
Episode 2: Zeenat
| 60 | "Runaway" | Krewella, Riaz Qadri & Ghulam Ali Qadri | Riaz Qadri | Ed, Logan, Cody Tarpley, Jahan Yousaf and Yasmine Yousaf, Dan Henig, Ghulam Fareed & Khwaja Mohammad Yaar | English & Punjabi | August 17, 2018 |
| 60 | "Gaddiye" | Asrar & Attaullah Khan Esakhelvi | Attaullah Khan Esakhelvi, Asrar & Ustad Sultan Ahmed | Asrar & Sohna Khan Bewas | Punjabi & Saraiki | August 17, 2018 |
| 60 | "Rasha Mama" | Zarsanga, Khumariyaan & Gul Panrra | Ustaad Gulzaman | Traditional Folk | Pashto | August 17, 2018 |
| 60 | "Ghoom Charakhra" | Abida Parveen & Ali Azmat | Abida Parveen & Ali Azmat | Hazrat Hussain Shah | Punjabi & Saraiki | August 17, 2018 |
Episode 3: Rung
| 61 | "Roye Roye" | Momina Mustehsan & Sahir Ali Bagga | Sahir Ali Bagga | Sahir Ali Bagga & Shakil Sohail | Punjabi | August 24, 2018 |
| 61 | "Allah Karesi" | Attaullah Khan Esakhelvi & Sanwal Esakhelvi | Attaullah Khan Esakhelvi & Sanwal Esakhelvi | Majboor Esakhelvi | Saraiki | August 24, 2018 |
| 61 | "Piya Ghar Aaya" | Fareed Ayaz, Abu Muhammad Qawwal & Brothers | Fareed Ayaz & Abu Muhammad Qawwal | Bulleh Shah | Farsi, Punjabi & Urdu | August 24, 2018 |
Episode 4: Gulistan
| 62 | "Aatish" | Aima Baig & Shuja Haider | Shuja Haider | Shuja Haider | Punjabi & Urdu | August 31, 2018 |
| 62 | "Nami Danam" | Chand Tara Orchestra | Shaheryar Tariq, Omran Shafique, Babar Sheikh & Rizwanullah Khan | Khwaja Usman Harooni | Farsi | August 31, 2018 |
| 62 | "Mahi Aaja" | Asim Azhar & Momina Mustehsan | Asim Azhar & Qasim Azhar | Asim Azhar | English, Punjabi & Urdu | August 31, 2018 |
Episode 5: Mauj
| 63 | "Malang" | Aima Baig & Sahir Ali Bagga | Sahir Ali Bagga | Imran Raza & Traditional Folk | Punjabi & Saraiki | September 7, 2018 |
| 63 | "Dastaan-e-Moomal Rano" | The Sketches | Ashfaque Ahmed & Saif Samejo | Shah Abdul Latif Bhittai | Sindhi | September 7, 2018 |
| 63 | "Dil Hai Pakistani" | Ali Azmat, Mangal, Darehan & Shayan | Ali Azmat, Mangal, Darehan & Shayan | Mangal & Sabir Zafar | Balochi & Urdu | September 7, 2018 |
Episode 6: Zamana
| 64 | "Ilallah" | Sounds of Kolachi | Ahsan Bari | Ahsan Bari | Purbi & Urdu | September 28, 2018 |
| 64 | "Hawa Hawa" | Gul Panrra & Hasan Jahangir | Mehboob Ashraf | Muhammad Nasir | Urdu | September 28, 2018 |
| 64 | "Tere Liye" | Ali Azmat, Riaz Qadri & Ghulam Ali Qadri | Ali Azmat & Riaz Qadri | Khwaja Ghulam Fareed & Sabir Zafar | Saraiki & Urdu | September 28, 2018 |
Episode 7: Sahil
| 65 | "Jind Mahiya" | Shuja Haider | Shuja Haider | Shuja Haider | Punjabi, Sindhi & Urdu | October 5, 2018 |
| 65 | "Ballay Ballay" | Abrar-ul-Haq & Aima Baig | Abrar-ul-Haq | Abrar-ul-Haq & Traditional Folk | Punjabi | October 5, 2018 |
| 65 | "Ya Qurban" | Khumariyaan | Khumariyaan | Traditional Folk | Pashto | October 5, 2018 |
| 65 | "Balaghal Ula Be Kamalihi" | Abida Parveen | Abida Parveen | Hazrat Bedam Shah Warsi | Arabic, Farsi & Urdu | October 5, 2018 |
Episode 8: Jashan
| 66 | "Wah Jo Kalaam" | Asrar, Vishnu & Shamu Bai | Ustad Sultan Ahmed | Asrar | Sindhi | October 12, 2018 |
| 66 | "Luddi Hai Jamalo" | Ali Sethi & Humaira Arshad | Wajahat Attre | Fazal Abbas & Khawaja Pervaiz | Punjabi | October 12, 2018 |
| 66 | "Apna Gham" | Bilal Khan & Mishal Khawaja | Bilal Khan | Bilal Khan | Urdu | October 12, 2018 |
Episode 9: Aftab
| 67 | "Dildar Sadqay" | Elizabeth Rai & Jawad Ahmad | Jawad Ahmad | Ahmad Anis, Asim Raza & Jawad Ahmad | Punjabi | October 19, 2018 |
| 67 | "Aurangzeb" | Mughal-e-Funk | Kami Paul, Farhan Ali, Rakae Jamil & Rufus Shahzad | Instrumental | Instrumental | October 19, 2018 |
| 67 | "Ko Ko Korina" | Ahad Raza Mir & Momina Mustehsan | Sohail Rana | Masroor Anwar | Urdu | October 19, 2018 |

=== Season 12 (2019) - Produced by Rohail Hyatt ===
| No. overall | Song Title | Artist(s) | Lyricist(s) | Language(s) | Original release date |
|---|---|---|---|---|---|
Season Opener
| 68 | "Wohi Khuda Hai" | Atif Aslam | Muzaffar Warsi | Arabic & Urdu | October 11, 2019 |
Episode 1
| 69 | "Dam Mastam" | Rahat Fateh Ali Khan | Rahat Fateh Ali Khan | Arabic, Persian & Punjabi | October 18, 2019 |
| 69 | "Ram Pam" | Shahab Hussain & Zoe Viccaji | Sahir Ali Bagga | Punjabi & Urdu | October 18, 2019 |
| 69 | "Maahi Diyaan Jhokaan" | Barkat Jamal Fakir Troupe | Khush Khair Muhammad & Sacchal Sarmast | Saraiki | October 18, 2019 |
Episode 2
| 70 | "Billo" | Abrar-ul-Haq | Abrar-ul-Haq | English & Punjabi | October 25, 2019 |
| 70 | "Saiyaan" | Rachel Viccaji & Shuja Haider | Punjabi folklore | Punjabi & Saraiki | October 25, 2019 |
| 70 | "Roshe" | Zeb Bangash | Habba Khatoon & Ghulam Ahmad Mahjoor | Kashmiri | October 25, 2019 |
Episode 3
| 71 | "Chal Raha Hoon" | Umair Jaswal | Umair Jaswal | Urdu | November 8, 2019 |
| 71 | "Mubarik Mubarik" | Atif Aslam & Banur's Band | Traditional folk & Atif Aslam | Balochi & Punjabi | November 8, 2019 |
| 71 | "Aadam" | Fareed Ayaz & Abu Muhammad with Humnawa | Amir Khusrau | Braj & Persian | November 8, 2019 |
Episode 4
| 72 | "Gulon Main Rang" | Ali Sethi | Faiz Ahmad Faiz | Urdu | November 15, 2019 |
| 72 | "Dhola" | Aima Baig & Sahir Ali Bagga | Sahir Ali Bagga | Punjabi | November 15, 2019 |
| 72 | "Hairaan Hua" | Sanam Marvi | Sachal Sarmast | Braj, Saraiki & Urdu | November 15, 2019 |
Episode 5
| 73 | "Balma" | Fariha Parvez | Traditional Indian | Braj | November 22, 2019 |
| 73 | "Heeray" | Aima Baig & Rahat Fateh Ali Khan | Javed Ali Khan | Punjabi | November 22, 2019 |
| 73 | "Daachi Waaliya" | Hadiqa Kiani | Bulleh Shah & Waris Shah | Punjabi | November 22, 2019 |
| 73 | "Mram Mram" | Shamali Afghan | Khatir Afridi & Rahim Ghamzada | Pashto | November 22, 2019 |
Episode 6
| 74 | "Bo Giyam" | Kashif Din & Nimra Rafiq | Nas Nafees & Sahir Ali Bagga | Burushaski & Urdu | November 29, 2019 |
| 74 | "Mundiya" | Ali Sethi & Qurat-ul-Ain Balouch | Khwaja Parwez | Punjabi | November 29, 2019 |
| 74 | "Aaye Kuch Abr" | Atif Aslam | Faiz Ahmad Faiz | Urdu | November 29, 2019 |
| 74 | "Tiri Pawanda" | Harsakhiyan | Shaikh Ayaz | Sindhi | November 29, 2019 |

=== Season 13 (2020) - Produced by Rohail Hyatt ===
| No. overall | Song Title | Artist(s) | Composer(s) | Lyricist(s) | Original release date |
|---|---|---|---|---|---|
Episode 1
| 75 | "Na Tutteya Ve" | Meesha Shafi, Fariha Pervez, Sanam Marvi, Sehar Gul Khan, Wajiha Naqvi & Zara Madani | Meesha Shafi & Shuja Haider | Asim Raza & Shuja Haider | 4 December 2020 |
| 75 | "Dil Khirki" | Mehdi Maloof | Mehdi Maloof | Mehdi Maloof | 4 December 2020 |
| 75 | "Jaag Rahi" | Ali Noor & Fariha Pervez | Mujahid Hussain & Rohail Hyatt | Asim Raza & Zahid Abbas | 4 December 2020 |
Episode 2
| 76 | "Dil Tarpe" | Rahat Fateh Ali Khan & Zara Madani | Rahat Fateh Ali Khan & Zara Madani | Rahat Fateh Ali Khan | 11 December 2020 |
| 76 | "Yaqeen" | Wajiha Naqvi | Wajiha Naqvi & Zara Madani | Wajiha Naqvi | 11 December 2020 |
| 76 | "Gal Sunn" | Ali Pervez Mehdi & Meesha Shafi | Ali Pervez Mehdi, Ahsan Pervez Mehdi & Zara Madani | Ali Pervez Mehdi, Ahsan Pervez Mehdi, Asim Raza & Manzoor Jhalla | 11 December 2020 |
Episode 3
| 77 | "Ishq Da Kukkar" | Sehar Gul Khan | Asim Raza | Asim Raza | 17 December 2020 |
| 77 | "Pardesiya" | Asim Raza | Asim Raza | Asim Raza | 17 December 2020 |
| 77 | "Har Funn Maula" | Sanam Marvi & Umair Jaswal | Shuja Haider | Asim Raza, Shah Abdul Latif Bhittai & Shuja Haider | 17 December 2020 |
Episode 4
| 78 | "Anbhol" | Sanam Marvi | Raag Aiman | Asim Raza | 25 December 2020 |
| 78 | "Megh" | Aizaz Sohail | Raag Megh | Raag Megh | 25 December 2020 |
| 78 | "Saari Dunya" | Bohemia | Bohemia | Bohemia & Asim Raza | 25 December 2020 |

=== Season 14 (2022) - Produced by Xulfi Khan ===
| No. overall | No. in season | Song Title | Artist(s) | Composer(s) | Lyricist(s) | Original release date |
|---|---|---|---|---|---|---|
Season Opener
| 79 | 1 | "Shuru Karein" | Rovalio | Rovalio | - | January 9, 2022 |
| 80 | 2 | "Tu Jhoom" | Abida Parveen & Naseebo Lal | Xulfi | Adnan Dhool | January 14, 2022 |
Episode 1
| 81 | 3 | "Kana Yaari" | Kaifi Khalil, Eva B & Abdul Wahab Bugti | Kaifi Khalil | Kaifi Khalil, Eva B & Abdul Wahab Bugti | January 19, 2022 |
| 82 | 4 | "Sajan Das Na" | Atif Aslam & Momina Mustehsan | Abdullah Siddiqui, Adnan Dhool, Momina Mustehsan & Xulfi | Adnan Dhool & Momina Mustehsan | January 23, 2022 |
| 83 | 5 | "Mehram" | Asfar Hussain & Arooj Aftab | Asfar Hussain & Xulfi | Asfar Hussain & Xulfi | January 28, 2022 |
Episode 2
| 84 | 6 | "Neray Neray Vas" | Soch & Butt Brothers | Soch & Butt Brothers | Adnan Dhool & Butt Brothers | February 1, 2022 |
| 85 | 7 | "Pasoori" | Ali Sethi & Shae Gill | Ali Sethi & Xulfi | Ali Sethi & Fazal Abbas | February 6, 2022 |
| 86 | 8 | "Ye Dunya" | Karakoram, Talha Anjum, Faris Shafi | Sherry Khattak & Xulfi | Adnan Dhool, Talha Anjum, Faris Shafi, Xulfi | February 12, 2022 |
Episode 3
| 87 | 9 | "Peechay Hutt" | Hasan Raheem, Justin Bibis, Talal Qureshi | Hassan Raheem, Talal Qureshi & Xulfi | Hasan Raheem & Talal Qureshi | February 19, 2022 |
| 88 | 10 | "Muaziz Saarif" | Faris Shafi & Meesha Shafi | Meesha Shafi, Faris Shafi & Xulfi | Faris Shafi & Meesha Shafi | February 27, 2022 |
| 89 | 11 | "Beparwah" | Momina Mustehsan | Adnan Dhool & Rabi Ahmed | Adnan Dhool, Momina Mustehsan & Xulfi | March 7, 2022 |
Episode 4
| 90 | 12 | "Thagyan" | Quratulain Baloch, Zain & Zohaib | Action Zain & Xulfi | Zohaib Ali, Zain Ali & Asim Raza | March 13, 2022 |
| 91 | 13 | "Go" | Abdullah Siddiqui & Atif Aslam | Abdullah Siddiqui, Maanu & Atif Aslam | Abdullah Siddiqui, Maanu, Xulfi | March 18, 2022 |
| 92 | 14 | "Phir Milenge" | Faisal Kapadia & Young Stunners | Xulfi | Adnan Dhool, Talha Anjum, Talhah Yunus, Xulfi | March 22, 2022 |

=== Season 15 (2024) - Produced by Xulfi Khan ===
| No. overall | No. in season | Song Title | Artist(s) | Composer(s) | Lyricist(s) | Original release date |
|---|---|---|---|---|---|---|
Episode 1
| 93 | 1 | "Aayi Aayi" | Noman Ali Rajper, Babar Mangi & Marvi Saiban | Abdullah Siddiqui, Babar Mangi, Noman Ali Rajper & Xulfi | Babar Mangi & Noman Ali Rajper | April 14, 2024 |
| 94 | 2 | "2AM" | Star Shah & Zeeshan Ali (musician) | Star Shah, Zeeshan Ali (musician) & Xulfi | Star Shah, Sarfaraz Safi & Zeeshan Ali (musician) | April 21, 2024 |
| 95 | 3 | "Maghron La" | Sabri Sisters & Rozeo | Adnan Dhool, Rozeo & Xulfi | Adnan Dhool, Rozeo & Xulfi | April 28, 2024 |
Episode 2
| 96 | 4 | "Harkalay" | REHMA & Zahoor | Curly Ney, Rehma, Xulfi & Zahoor | Abdullah Siddiqui, Hidayat Marwat, Rehma & Zahoor | May 5, 2024 |
| 97 | 5 | "O Yaara" | Abdul Hannan & Kaavish | Abdul Hannan & Jaffer Zaidi | Abdul Hannan & Jaffer Zaidi | May 12, 2024 |
| 98 | 6 | "Chal Chaliye" | Farheen Raza Jaffry & Sajjad Ali | Sajjad Ali, Shabi Ali & Xulfi | Sajjad Ali & Xulfi | May 19, 2024 |
Episode 3
| 99 | 7 | "Blockbuster" | Faris Shafi, Umair Butt & Gharwi Group | Faris Shafi, Shamroz Butt, Umair Butt & Xulfi | Faris Shafi, Shamroz Butt, Umair Butt & Xulfi | May 25, 2024 |
| 100 | 8 | "Jhol" | Annural Khalid & Maanu | Maanu & Xulfi | Annural Khalid, Maanu, Wajeeha Badar & Xulfi | June 14, 2024 |
| 101 | 9 | "Turri Jandi" | Shazia Manzoor & Hasan Raheem | Xulfi, Abdullah Siddiqui & Hasan Raheem | Adnan Dhool, Hasan Raheem & Xulfi | June 21, 2024 |
Episode 4
| 102 | 10 | "Piya Piya Calling" | Kaifi Khalil, Karpe & Amanda Delara | Karpe (Chirag, Magdi), Kaifi Khalil, Kaleb Isaac Ghebreiesus, Amanda Delara, Eirik Kiil Saga, Thomas Meyer Kongshavn & Aksel Carlson | Karpe (Chirag, Magdi) & Kaifi Khalil; Additional Lyrics: Xulfi, Siddharth Amit Bhavsar & Manan Desai | June 28, 2024 |
| 103 | 11 | "Mehman" | Zeb Bangash, Noorima Rehan & Nizam Torwali | Xulfi, Zeb Bangash & Abdullah Siddiqui | Xulfi, Zeb Bangash & Asfar Hussain | July 4, 2024 |

== Coke Studio Explorer ==
| No. overall | Song Title | Artist(s) | Lyricist(s) | Language | Original release date |
|---|---|---|---|---|---|
| 1 | "Pareek" | Ariana & Amrina | Traditional | Kalsaha | July 3, 2018 |
| 2 | "Faqeera" | Shamu Bai & Vishnu | Baba Bulleh Shah | Sindhi | July 5, 2010 |
| 3 | "Naseebaya" | Darehan, Shayan & Mangal | Traditional | Balochi | July 7, 2010 |
| 4 | "Tere Bin Soona" | Mishal Khawaja | Mishal Khawaja | Urdu | July 9, 2010 |
| 5 | "Ha Gulo" | Qasamir | Traditional | Kashmiri | July 11, 2010 |

== Coke Studio Nu.WAV ==
| Song | Artists | Producer | Composer | Lyricist | Release date |
|---|---|---|---|---|---|
| "Dil" | Afusic and Zoha Waseem | Ali Soomro | Afusic and Ali Raza | Afusic and Ali Raza | 3 September 2026 |
| "Rangeen" | Hasan Raheem, Izz Chughtai and Umair | Umair | Umair | Hasan Raheem | 17 September 2026 |
| "Maheya" | Asim Azhar, AARYAN and Rovalio | Rovalio | Asim Azhar, Azhar Hussain and Rovalio | Asim Azhar, AARYAN and Kumail Abbas | 1 October 2026 |
| "Shabnam" | Maanu, Zoha Waseem and Talal Qureshi | Talal Qureshi | Maanu | Maanu and Zoha Waseem | 15 October 2026 |
| "Qasam" | Shae Gill and Afusic | Abdullah Kasumbi | Afusic and Abdullah Kasumbi | Afusic | 29 October 2026 |
| "Diwanay Dil" | Young Stunners, Sabaat Batin and Jokhay | Jokhay | Talha Anjum, Talhah Yunus, Sabaat Batin and Jokhay | Talha Anjum, Talhah Yunus and Sabaat Batin | 12 November 2026 |

== Specials ==
=== Special (2010) ===
Coke Studio Special is part of the Coke Studio video web blog series which included special features such as unreleased performances from the second season of the show. The first video blog was released on 15 January 2010 and the last video blog was released on 16 May 2010, on the YouTube channel of the show.

| Web Blog | Song(s) Title | Artist(s) | Producer | Original release date |
|---|---|---|---|---|
| 1 | "Saari Raat Jaga (Unedited Version)" | Noori | Rohail Hyatt | 1 February 2010 |
| 2 | "Hung (Percussion Jam)" | Gumby & Gupreet Channa | Rohail Hyatt | 19 March 2010 |
| 3 | "Aj Latha Naeeo (Extended Version)" | Javed Bashir | Rohail Hyatt | 16 May 2010 |

=== Phir Se Game Utha Dain (2015) ===
| No. | Song Title | Artist(s) | Original Song by | Produced by | Directed by | Original release date |
|---|---|---|---|---|---|---|
| 1 | "Phir Se Game Utha Dain" | Atif Aslam, Strings, Asrar & Jimmy Khan | Matt Sloggett | Strings | Asad ul Haq | 29 January 2015 |

=== Hum Aik Hain (2019) ===
| No. | Song Title | Artist(s) | Written by | Backing Choir | Produced by | Original release date |
|---|---|---|---|---|---|---|
| 1 | "Hum Aik Hain" | Adnan Dhool | Xulfi & Sami Khan | Sacred Heart School, Surtaal Music Academy & Sana Mamdot | Xulfi | 1 June 2019 |

=== Ramadan (2020) ===
| No. | Song Title | Artist(s) | Arranger | Associate Music Producer | Producer | Original release date |
|---|---|---|---|---|---|---|
| 1 | "Asma-ul-Husna (The 99 Names)" | Atif Aslam | Xulfi & Melvin Arthur | Sherry Khattak | Xulfi | 14 May 2020 |

=== Pakistan Day Special (2021) ===
| No. | Song Title | Artist(s) | Lyricist(s) | Music Producers | Producer | Original release date |
|---|---|---|---|---|---|---|
| 1 | "Ao Ehad Karain" | Adnan Dhool, Ali Hamza, Kashif Din, Mehak Ali, Nimra Rafiq, Sadaat Shafqat Amanat Ali Khan, Surtaal Music Academy, Young Stunners & Zaw Ali | Masroor Anwar, Mehshar Badayuni, Jamiluddin Aali, Tufail Hushyarpuri & Jamiluddin Aali | Rakae Jamil, Kami Paul & Ahsan Parvez Mehdi | Ali Hamza | 19 March 2021 |

=== Cricket Khidaiye (2021) ===
| No. | Song Title | Artist(s) | Lyricist(s) | Additional Music Production | Producer | Original release date |
|---|---|---|---|---|---|---|
| 1 | "Cricket Khidaiye" | Faris Shafi, Talal Qureshi & Atif Aslam | Faris Shafi, Omar Ahmad & MAANU | Ahsan Pervez Mehdi | Talal Qureshi | 24 October 2021 |

== See also ==
- Coke Studio (Pakistan)
- Rohail Hyatt
- Strings
- Ali Hamza
- Zohaib Kazi
- Music of Pakistan
