= Coke Studio Pakistan season 3 =

Third television season of Coke Studio

Coke Studio Pakistan
- Season 3
- Coke Studio 3 cover
- Starring: Featured Artists
- No. of episodes: 5

Release
- Original network: Webcast
- Original release: June 1 – July 31, 2010

Season chronology
- ← Previous; Season 2 Next → Season 4

The third season of the Pakistani music television series Coke Studio Pakistan commenced airing on 1 June 2010 and ended on 31 July 2010.

Rohail Hyatt continued as the executive producer along with Umber Hyatt as the producer of the show. The production team included Naseer-ud-din Wasif as the technical manager, Zeeshan Parwez assisted by Adnan Malik on video production, Danial Hyatt on visual and animations and Selina Rashid with her firm Lotus as public relations.

== Artists ==
=== Featured Artists ===
The third season featured a return of Noori, Zeb and Haniya and Arieb Azhar, who were also part of second season of the show.

- Abida Parveen
- Amanat Ali
- Arieb Azhar
- Arif Lohar
- Aunty Disco Project
- Entity Paradigm
- Fakir Juman Shah
- Karavan
- Meesha Shafi
- Noori
- Rizwan-Muazzam
- Sanam Marvi
- Tina Sani
- Zeb and Haniya

== Musicians ==
The third season also saw a change in the house band as Natasha De Souza was replaced by Sanam Saeed and Zoe Viccaji whom joined Saba Shabbir on backing vocals.

House Band
- Drums: Louis 'Gumby' Pinto
- Bass Guitar: Kamran Zafar
- Guitar: Asad Ahmed and Omran 'Momo' Shafique
- Keyboard: Jaffer Ali Zaidi
- Violin: Javed Iqbal
- Percussions: Babar Khanna, Sikander Mufti and Zulfiq 'Shazee' Ahmed Khan

Guest Musicians
- Flute: Baqir Abbas
- Sagar Veena: Noor Zehra
- Rubab: Sadiq Sameer

Backing Vocals
- Saba Shabbir
- Sanam Saeed
- Zoe Viccaji

== Episodes ==
The third season featured five episodes which are titled as Reason, Will, Conception, Form and Realisation respectively; each episode with 5 songs, making a total of 25 songs. The show was produced at Rohail Hyatt's production company Frequency Media Pvt. Ltd and distributed by Coca-Cola Pakistan.

| No. Overall | # | Song(s) Title | Artist(s) | Lyricist(s) | Language(s) | Original air date |
Episode 1 - Reason
| 10 | 1 | Na Raindee Hai | Arieb Azhar | Bulleh Shah | Punjabi | 1 June 2010 |
| 10 | 2 | Ramooz-e-Ishq | Abida Parveen | Bedam Shah Warsi, Mir Dard & Iqbal | Punjabi | 1 June 2010 |
| 10 | 3 | Alif Allah | Arif Lohar ft. Meesha Shafi | Sultan Bahu | Punjabi | 1 June 2010 |
| 10 | 4 | Yaadein | Karavan | Karavan | Urdu | 1 June 2010 |
| 10 | 5 | Bibi Sanam | Zeb and Haniya | Folk | Persian | 1 June 2010 |
Episode 2 - Will
| 11 | 6 | Aisha | Amanat Ali | | Urdu | 17 June 2010 |
| 11 | 7 | Moomal Raano | Fakir Juman Shah | Shah Abdul Latif Bhittai | Sindhi | 17 June 2010 |
| 11 | 8 | Tan Dole | Noori ft. Zeb and Haniya | Noori | Urdu | 17 June 2010 |
| 11 | 9 | Bolo Bolo | Entity Paradigm | Sajjad Ali | Urdu | 17 June 2010 |
| 11 | 10 | Nainaan de Aakhe | Rizwan & Muazzam | Shah Hussain | Punjabi | 17 June 2010 |
Episode 3 - Conception
| 12 | 11 | Pritam | Sanam Marvi | Rajasthani Folk | Braj & Marwari | 4 July 2010 |
| 12 | 12 | Chori Chori | Meesha Shafi | Reshma | Punjabi | 4 July 2010 |
| 12 | 13 | Mori Araj Suno | Tina Sani ft. Arieb Azhar | Faiz Ahmad Faiz | Braj, Punjabi & Urdu | 4 July 2010 |
| 12 | 14 | Sultanat | Aunty Disco Project | Aunty Disco Project | Urdu | 4 July 2010 |
| 12 | 15 | Nigah-e-Darwaishan | Abida Parveen | Bulleh Shah, Seemab Akbarabadi & Sultan Bahu | Punjabi & Urdu | 4 July 2010 |
Episode 4 - Form
| 13 | 16 | Hor Vi Neevan Ho | Noori | Shah Hussain | Punjabi | 14 July 2010 |
| 13 | 17 | Kaisay Mumkin Hai | Karavan | Karavan | Urdu | 14 July 2010 |
| 13 | 18 | Nazaar Eyle | Zeb and Haniya | Folk | Turkish | 14 July 2010 |
| 13 | 19 | Haq Maujood | Sanam Marvi ft. Amanat Ali | Bulleh Shah, Khwaja Ghulam Farid, Sachal Sarmast & Shah Hussain | Persian, Punjabi & Siraiki | 14 July 2010 |
| 13 | 20 | Mirza Saahibaan | Arif Lohar | Folk | Punjabi | 14 July 2010 |
Episode 5 - Realisation
| 14 | 21 | Ay Watan ke Sajeele Jawaano | Amanat Ali | Jamiluddin Aali | Urdu | 31 July 2010 |
| 14 | 22 | Soz-e-Ishq | Abida Parveen | Bulleh Shah, Kabir & Sultan Bahu | Braj, Punjabi & Urdu | 31 July 2010 |
| 14 | 23 | Jana Jogi De Naal | Zeb and Haniya & Rizwan and Muazzam | Bulleh Shah | Punjabi | 31 July 2010 |
| 14 | 24 | Nawai Ney | Tina Sani | Maulana Rumi | Urdu | 31 July 2010 |
| 14 | 25 | Manzil-e-Sufi | Sanam Marvi | Sachal Sarmast | Siraiki | 31 July 2010 |
