= Coke Studio Pakistan season 5 =

Fifth television season of Coke Studio

Coke Studio Pakistan
- Season 5
- Coke Studio 5 Cover
- Starring: Vocalists
- No. of episodes: 5

Release
- Original network: YouTube
- Original release: May 13 – July 8, 2012

Season chronology
- ← Previous; Season 4 Next → Season 6

The fifth season of the Pakistani music television series Coke Studio Pakistan commenced airing on 13 May 2012. The season consisted of five episodes, which aired on 13 May, 27 May, 10 June, 24 June and 8 July respectively.

Rohail Hyatt and Umber Hyatt continued as producers of the show.

== Artists ==
=== Vocalists ===
- Atif Aslam
- Bilal Khan
- Bohemia
- Chakwal Group
- Fareed Ayaz & Abu Mohammad
- Farhan Rais Khan
- Hadiqa Kiani
- Hamayoon Khan
- Meesha Shafi
- Tahir Mithu
- Overload
- Qayaas
- Rachel Viccaji
- SYMT
- Sanam Marvi
- Uzair Jaswal

=== Musician ===
House Band
- Asad Ahmed
- Babar Ali Khanna
- Farhad Humayun
- Javed Iqbal
- Kamran "Mannu" Zafar
- Mubashir Admani
- Omran "Momo" Shafique
- Sikander Mufti

Backing Vocals
- Rachel Viccaji
- Zoe Viccaji

Guest Musician
- Sadiq Sameer

== Production ==
The fifth season saw the return of Bilal Khan, Fareed Ayaz & Abu Muhammad, Atif Aslam and Meesha Shafi, all artists who had previously performed on Coke Studio. Folk singers Tahir Mithu and Chakwal group were among the vocalists. In the house band, Louis 'Gumby' Pinto left the show because he was the executive producer of the show Uth Records by Ufone. Jaffer Ali Zaidi also left the show and was replaced by Mubashir Admani. Raheel Manzar Paul and Zulfiq 'Shazee' Ahmed Khan also departed from the show. Farhad Humayun was recruited as the new drummer for the fifth series. The season featured 5 episodes, each with 5 songs, making a total of 25 songs. The show was produced by Rohail Hyatt's production company, Frequency Media Pvt. Ltd., and distributed by Coca-Cola Pakistan.

Speaking at the launch of Coke Studio Season 5, Rohail Hyatt said:

Entering into our 5th season, we at Coke Studio believe our journey continues to explore the wealth of talent and cultural diversity that we as a nation are blessed with. Everyone has put in their best again because we believe in sharing and presenting ourselves to the best of our abilities. It is without doubt that the love and respect that our audience has showered us with, serves as our inspiration. I’d like to thank everyone who has supported our efforts. I hope you find something in your life that becomes your source of inspiration and allows you to better enjoy the beauty of life itself.

— Rohail Hyatt, executive producer Coke Studio

== Reception ==
Critics particularly appreciated the inclusion of new acts such as Qayaas and Symt. Vocalists like Hadiqa Kiani and Uzair Jaswal also received positive attention for their emotive renditions in Kamli and Nindiya Ke Paar respectively.

Rafaay Mahmood and Ali Raj of Express Tribune praised the song Charkha Nolakha by Atif Aslam and Qayaas was particularly celebrated as one of the best-arranged and most memorable performances in the show's history.

Other tracks such as Koi Labda by Symt and Sanam Marvi received acclaim for their vocal strength and musical innovation.

== Episodes ==
No. overall	Song Title	Artist(s)	Lyricist(s)	Language(s)	Original release date
Episode 1
20	"Paisay Da Nasha"	Bohemia	Bohemia	Punjabi	May 13, 2012
20	"Tum Kaho"	Symt	Haroon Shahid	Urdu	May 13, 2012
20	"Kamlee"	Hadiqa Kiani	Bulleh Shah	Punjabi	May 13, 2012
20	"Larsha Pekhawar Ta"	Hamayoon Khan	Pastho folk	Pashto	May 13, 2012
20	"Charkha Nolakha"	Atif Aslam & Qayaas	Nusrat Fateh Ali Khan	Punjabi	May 13, 2012
Episode 2
21	"Khabaram Raseeda"	Fareed Ayaz & Abu Muhammad	Amir Khusrau	Urdu & Persian	May 26, 2012
21	"Larho Mujhey"	Bilal Khan	Bilal Khan	Urdu	May 26, 2012
21	"Rabba Sacheya"	Atif Aslam	Faiz Ahmad Faiz & Khwaja Ghulam Farid	Punjabi	May 26, 2012
21	"Pere Pavandi Saan"	Tahir Mithu	Shah Abdul Latif Bhittai	Sindhi	May 26, 2012
21	"Ishq Aap Bhe Awalla"	Chakwal Group & Meesha Shafi	Sufi Poetry	Punjabi	May 26, 2012
Episode 3
22	"Nindiya Ke Paar"	Uzair Jaswal	Yasir Jaswal	Braj, Punjabi & Urdu	June 24, 2012
22	"Rung"	Hadiqa Kiani	Amir Khusrau	Braj	June 24, 2012
22	"Neray Aah"	Overload & Rachel Viccaji	-	Punjabi	June 24, 2012
22	"School Di Kitaab"	Bohemia	Bohemia	Punjabi	June 24, 2012
22	"Taaray"	Bilal Khan	Bilal Khan	Urdu	June 24, 2012
Episode 4
23	"Tora Bahraam Khaana"	Hamayoon Khan	Pastho folk	Pashto	July 8, 2012
23	"Rung"	Fareed Ayaz & Abu Muhammad	Amir Khusrau	Braj	July 8, 2012
23	"Bolay"	Uzair Jaswal	Uzair Jaswal	Urdu	July 8, 2012
23	"Kandyaari Dhol Geet"	Bohemia & Chakwal Group	Aziz Lohar	Punjabi	July 8, 2012
23	"Dholna"	Atif Aslam	Atif Aslam & Nusrat Fateh Ali Khan	Braj, Punjabi & Urdu	July 8, 2012
Episode 5
24	"Koi Labda"	Sanam Marvi & Symt	Haroon Shahid, Hasan Omer & Nusrat Fateh Ali Khan	Punjabi	July 15, 2012
24	"Wah Wah Jhulara"	Chakwal Group	Folk	Punjabi	July 15, 2012
24	"Dasht-E-Tanhai"	Meesha Shafi	Faiz Ahmad Faiz	Urdu	July 15, 2012
24	"Mahi"	Overload	Overload	Punjabi	July 15, 2012
24	"Seher"	Farhan Rais Khan	-	Instrumental	July 15, 2012
