= Coke Studio Pakistan season 6 =

Sixth television season of Coke Studio

Coke Studio Pakistan
- Season 6
- Coke Studio 6 Cover
- Starring: Featured Artists
- No. of episodes: 6

Release
- Original network: Webcast
- Original release: 20 October 2013 – 5 January 2014

Season chronology
- ← Previous; Season 5 Next → Season 7

The sixth season of the Pakistani music television series Coke Studio Pakistan premiered on 20 October 2013 and concluded on 5 January 2014. All songs were arranged and produced by Rohail Hyatt. The show was produced at Rohail Hyatt's production company, Frequency Media Pvt. Ltd., and distributed by Coca-Cola Pakistan.

== Artists ==
The season saw the return of artists like Atif Aslam, Ali Azmat, Zeb & Haniya, Sanam Marvi and Saieen Zahoor. The house band also featured international musicians for the first time in the show's history, from countries like Italy, Serbia, Nepal, Turkey, Bangladesh, Morocco and Norway, including Sweden-based Balochi singer Rostam Mirlashari and Turkish singer Sumru Ağıryürüyen.

=== Featured Artists ===
- Abrar-ul-Haq
- Alamgir
- Ali Azmat
- Asad Abbas
- Atif Aslam
- Ayesha Omer
- Fariha Pervez
- Muazzam Ali Khan
- Rostam Mirlashari
- Rustam Fateh Ali Khan
- Saieen Zahoor
- Sanam Marvi
- Sumru Ağıryürüyen
- Umair Jaswal
- Zara Madani
- Zeb & Haniya
- Zoe Viccaji

=== Backing Vocals ===
- Rachel Viccaji
- Zoe Viccaji

=== Musicians ===
Pakistan
- Asad Ahmed
- Babar Khanna
- Balochi Group
- Dhol Group
- Jaffer Ali Zaidi
- Kamran "Mannu" Zafar
- Louis ‘Gumby’ Pinto
- Omran ‘Momo’ Shafique
- Qawwal Group
- Siddiq Kamash
- Sikandar Mufti
- Zulfiqar Ali

Nepal
- Anil Gandharba
- Kiran Nepali
- Rubin Kumar
- Siddharta Maharjan

Morocco
- Aissawa Ensemble
- Aziz Alami Chentoufi
- Driss Berrada

Turkey
- Burhan Hasdemir
- Göksel Baktagir

Norway
- Anne Hytta

Bangladesh
- Muhammed Arif-ur-Rahman

Italy
- L'Orchestra di Piazza Vittorio
- Emanuele Bultrini
- Ernesto Lopez Maturell
- Kaw Dialy Madi Sissoko
- Leandro Piccioni
- Mario Tronco
- Omar Lopez Valle
- Pap Yeri Samb
- Peppe D’Argenzio
- Pino Pecorelli
- Raul Scebba
- Ziad Trabelsi

Serbia
- Branko Trijic
- Brass Section
- Dejan Antovic
- Filip Bulatovic
- Goran Antovic
- Ivana Pavlovic
- Jovan Satric
- String Orchestra
- Vladimir Nikolov

== Episodes ==
No. overall	Song Title	Artist(s)	Lyricist(s)	Language(s)	Original release date
Season Openers
25	"Jogi"	Muazzam Ali Khan & Fariha Pervez	Bulleh Shah	Punjabi	20 October 2013
25	"Laili Jaan"	Zeb and Haniya	Ahmad Zahir	Persian	24 October 2013
Episode 1
26	"Khayaal"	Umair Jaswal	Umair Jaswal	Urdu	26 October 2013
26	"Babu Bhai"	Ali Azmat	Yawar Mian	Urdu	26 October 2013
26	"Rabba Ho"	Saieen Zahoor & Sanam Marvi	Sachchal Sarmast & Shah Latif Bhitai	Punjabi & Persian	26 October 2013
Episode 2
27	"Laage Re Nain"	Ayesha Omer	Raga	Poorbi	23 November 2013
27	"Tori Chab / Abhogi"	Rustam Fateh Ali Khan & Sumru Ağıryürüyen	Raga	Braj & Turkish	23 November 2013
27	"Ishq Di Booti"	Abrar-ul-Haq	Abrar-ul-Haq	Punjabi	23 November 2013
Episode 3
28	"Neer Bharan"	Zara Madani & Muazzam Ali Khan	Raga	Braj	7 December 2013
28	"Channa"	Atif Aslam	Raga	Punjabi	7 December 2013
28	"Yaar Vekho"	Sanam Marvi	Sultan Bahu & Sachchal Sarmast	Punjabi	7 December 2013
28	"Raat Gaey"	Zoe Viccaji	Sabir Zafar	Urdu	7 December 2013
Episode 4
29	"Aamay Bhashalli Rey"	Alamgir & Fariha Pervez	Bengali Folk	Bengali & Braj	21 December 2013
29	"Laila O Laila"	Rostam Mirlashari	Balochi Folk	Balochi	21 December 2013
29	"Ishq Kinara"	Sumru Ağıryürüyen & Zoe Viccaji	Sabir Zafar	Turkish & Urdu	21 December 2013
29	"Mahi Gal"	Asad Abbas & Fariha Pervez	Sufi Folk	Persian & Punjabi	21 December 2013
Episode 5
30	"Miyan Ki Malhaar"	Ayesha Omer, Fariha Pervez & Zara Madani	Raga	Braj	5 January 2014
30	"Moray Naina"	Zara Madani	Javed Ali Khan	Braj	5 January 2014
30	"Sawaal – Kande Utte"	Muazzam Mujahid Ali Khan & Ali Azmat	Bulleh Shah & Waris Shah	Punjabi & Urdu	5 January 2014
30	"Allah Hu"	Abrar-ul-Haq & Saieen Zahoor	Khatir Afridi & Rahim Ghamzada	Punjabi	5 January 2014
