= Umair Jaswal =

Pakistani singer and actor (born 1986)

- عمير جسوال
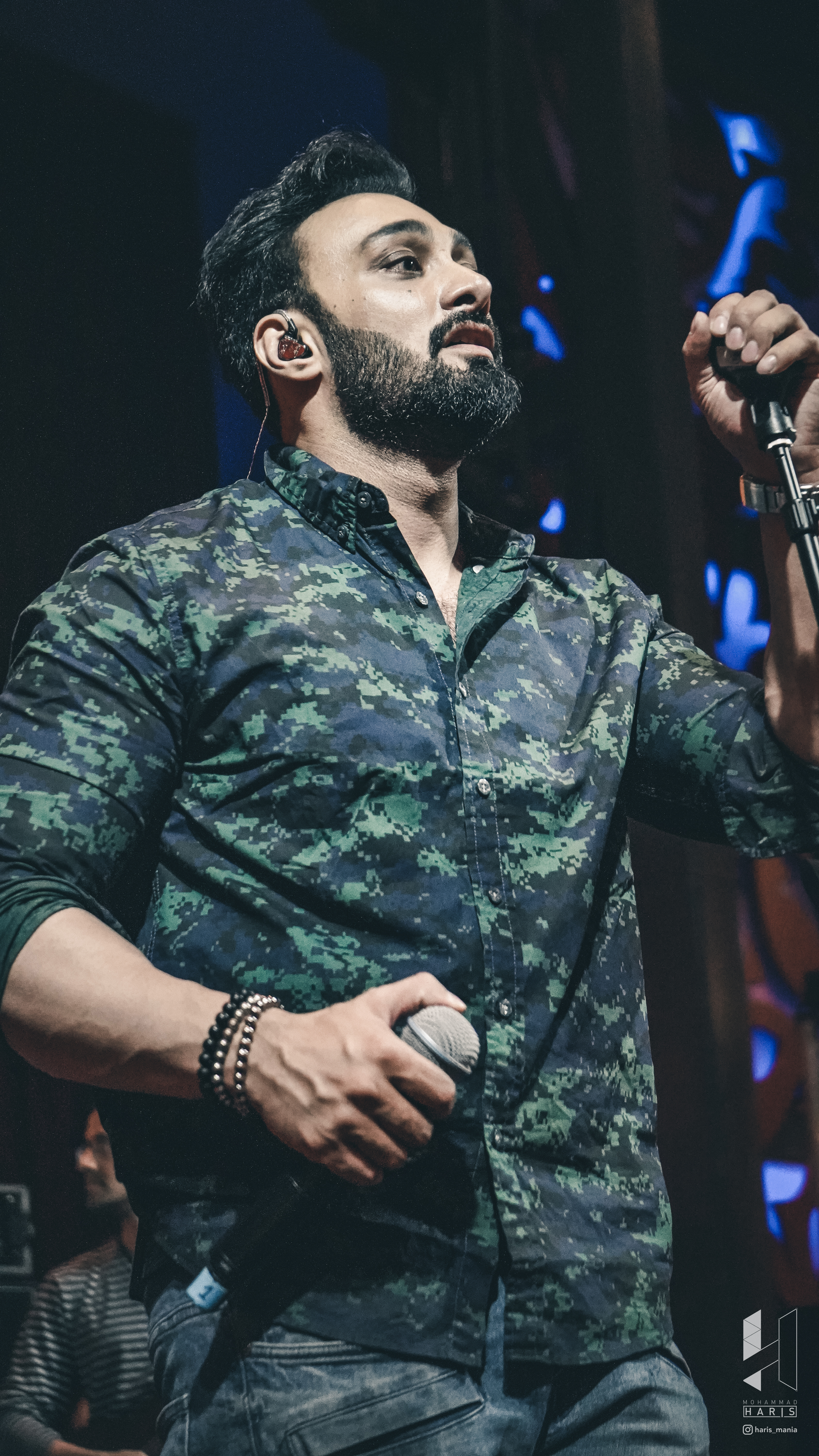
- Born: 20 December 1986 (age 39); Islamabad, Pakistan
- Occupations: Singer-songwriter; Music producer; Actor
- Spouse: Sana Javed (m. 2020; div. 2023)
- Relatives: Yasir Jaswal (brother); Uzair Jaswal (brother)
- Musical career
- Genres: Pop; rock
- Instrument: Vocals
- Years active: 2008–present
- Label: Coke Studio
- Website: www.umairjaswal.com

Umair Jaswal (Urdu: عمیر جسوال) is a Pakistani actor, singer-songwriter and music producer from Islamabad. He was also lead vocalist of the rock band Qayaas. He is the brother of singers Yasir Jaswal and Uzair Jaswal.

== Early and personal life ==
The son of a scientist, Jaswal initially studied dentistry before switching to geology, but was also interested in music and acting; joining a band and performing in plays.

Born and raised in Islamabad, he has five brothers, including fellow artists Yasir Jaswal and Uzair Jaswal, and one sister.

He completed his schooling from IMCB F-10/3 Islamabad.

On 20 October 2020 it was announced that he had married Pakistani actress Sana Javed. In 2023, it was rumoured that the marriage had ended. The rumour was eventually confirmed with the marriage of Javed with Shoaib Malik, with both posting pictures from their wedding on their respective Instagram pages. Jaswal remarried in October 2023.

== Career ==
=== Music ===
Jaswal started his career in 2008 by joining the rock band Qayaas and gained popularity in 2009 with the song Tanha and Umeed.

He joined Coke Studio season 5 with his band in 2012 and performed the song Charkha Nolakha with Atif Aslam. Qayaas released their debut album Uss Paar in 2011 with Jaswal as a lead vocalist. The songs Halaak and Inquilaab from the album were featured in the film Waar. In Coke Studio season 6, Jaswal decided to go solo. He performed the song Khayal on the first episode of Coke Studio season 6 which was also featured in film Waar.

In 2013 Jaswal was nominated as Pakistan's youth ambassador by the International Human Rights Commission.

In Coke Studio season 8, Jaswal performed the song Sammi Meri Waar with QB which received more than two million views in two weeks. In an interview to The Express Tribune he told that he also received hate mails after release of the song. Jaswal said: "Man! I’ve received audio messages from places like Iraq. The main idea behind doing this song was to penetrate a bigger market and fortunately that is exactly what happened".

=== Acting ===
Jaswal made his acting debut on television by appearing in the serial Mor Mahal (2016), playing the lead role of a nawab alongside Meesha Shafi.

A year later, in 2017, Jaswal made his Lollywood debut in the war epic film Yalghaar as Captain Umair.

== Discography ==
Coke Studio songs

Jaswal has performed the following songs:

- Charkla Nolaka – Coke Studio Season 5
- Khayaal – Coke Studio Season 6
- Sammi Meri Waar – Coke Studio Season 8
- Khaki Banda – Coke Studio Season 9
- Sasu Mangay – Coke Studio Season 9
- Dam Mast Qalandar – Coke Studio Season 10
- Chal Raha Hoon – Coke Studio Season 12
- Har Funn Maula - Coke Studio Season 13

First solo album

- Na Rahoon – A single released from the solo album of Jaswal features Faraz Anwar on lead guitar. The music video was directed by his brother and director Yasir Jaswal. The full album was released in 2018.

== Filmography ==
Television

Serial	Role	Channel	Year	Notes
Mor Mahal	Nawab Asif Jahan	Geo TV	2016	TV debut

Film

Film	Role	Year	Notes
Yalghaar	Captain Umair	2017	Lollywood debut

== See also ==
- Qayaas
- Coke Studio (Pakistan)
- Jat Muslim
- List of Pakistani musicians
