= Coke Studio Pakistan season 13 =

Thirteenth television season of Coke Studio Pakistan

Coke Studio 2020
- Season 13
- Starring: Vocalists
- No. of episodes: 4

Release
- Original network: YouTube
- Original release: 4 December – 25 December 2020

Season chronology
- ← Previous; Season 12 Next → Season 14

The 2020 edition of the Pakistani Music television series Coke Studio Pakistan, titled as Coke Studio 2020, commenced airing on 4 December 2020 and concluded on 25 December 2020. The season was produced by show's founder Rohail Hyatt and distributed by Coca-Cola Pakistan.

Coke Studio 2020 was opened by an all-female anthem "Na Tutteya Ve". The show is the shortest season in Coke Studio's history, with a total of 12 original songs released in the span of one month, accompanied by a revised video format. The revised video format was similar to Season 6's format.

== Artists ==
Vocalists of Coke Studio 2020

The season featured four emerging artists. Umair Jaswal made his eleventh appearance on the show and Bohemia returned after eight years.

=== Vocalists ===
- Aizaz Sohail
- Ali Noor
- Ali Pervaiz Mehdi
- Bohemia
- Fariha Pervez
- Meesha Shafi
- Mehdi Maloof
- Rahat Fateh Ali Khan
- Sanam Marvi
- Sehar Gul Khan
- Umair Jaswal
- Wajeeha Naqvi
- Zara Madani

=== Backing Vocals ===
- Kumail Jaffery
- Nimra Rafiq
- Shahab Hussain
- Wajiha Naqvi
- Zara Madani

=== Musicians ===
Coke Studio 2020 saw collaborations with international musicians from around the world including Lebanon, Nepal, Turkey and Serbia. (Note: The list is structured according to the musician's nationality.)

Pakistan
- Percussions: Abier "Veeru" Shaan
- Electric guitar: Asad Ahmed
- Eastern Percussions: Babar Khanna
- Bass: Kamran "Mannu" Zafar
- Rabab: Nawazish Nasri
- Acoustic Guitar: Rohail Hyatt
- Keyboard: Rohail Hyatt
- Sitar: Shehroze Hussain

Lebanon
- Percussions (Darbuka, Riqh, Bendir): Elias Abboud

Nepal
- Bells, Ghungroo & Tinchu Percussions: Siddharth Maharjan

Turkey
- Drums: Volkan Öktem

Serbia
- Keyboard: Goran Antović
- Electric guitar: Nenad Gajin
- Trumpet: Marko Djordjević
- Trombone: Kosta Vukašinović
- Tenor Saxophone: Ljumbomir Turajlija

== Production ==
The thirteenth edition of Coke Studio was going for a multi-producer format, many producers were on board including Haniya Aslam. Everything had been planned, set and halls were booked, artists had been confirmed and the show was few weeks away from final recordings. And then in May 2020, a Pakistani media reported that Coke Studio 13 is cancelled due to COVID-19 pandemic.

In October 2020 Coca-Cola Pakistan released an advertisement announcing the return of Coke Studio 2020, a special edition. The show was shortened after major budget cuts because of coronavirus pandemic. All of the rehearsals were done remotely, both singers and musicians were recorded separately due to COVID-19 SOPs. The season is referred as Coke Studio 2020 because of coronavirus pandemic. The season was produced by Rohail Hyatt's production company Frequency Media and distributed by Coca-Cola Pakistan.

Speaking at the launch of Coke Studio 2020, Rohail Hyatt said,

Working on this season has been a valuable learning experience. It has left me with a realization that in order for anything to survive, it must have the ability to change and adapt to the circumstances that surround it. Even in trying times, we must not give up but instead re-invent ourselves and keep moving ahead. Despite the limitations of this pandemic, everyone on the team, especially the artists, willingly left their comfort zones only to help keep alive the tradition of sharing music. It is with this same spirit that we bring Coke Studio to you this year; a humble effort to share something familiar, yet new

— Rohail Hyatt, producer Coke Studio 2020

general manager of Coca-Cola Pakistan, Fahad Ashraf said,

Coke Studio 2020 is going to be unprecedented, just like the current situation. We’ve tried to retain the core values of the platform, while ensuring the health and safety of everyone involved. It's intended to be fresh, experimental and diverse, and we sincerely hope it will help to lift the spirits of the nation

== Episodes ==
No. overall	Song Title	Artist(s)	Composer(s)	Lyricist(s)	Original release date
Episode 1
75	"Na Tutteya Ve"	Meesha Shafi, Fariha Pervez, Sanam Marvi, Sehar Gul Khan, Wajiha Naqvi & Zara Madani	Meesha Shafi & Shuja Haider	Asim Raza & Shuja Haider	4 December 2020
75	"Dil Khirki"	Mehdi Maloof	Mehdi Maloof	Mehdi Maloof	4 December 2020
75	"Jaag Rahi"	Ali Noor & Fariha Pervez	Mujahid Hussain & Rohail Hyatt	Asim Raza & Zahid Abbas	4 December 2020
Episode 2
76	"Dil Tarpe"	Rahat Fateh Ali Khan & Zara Madani	Rahat Fateh Ali Khan & Zara Madani	Rahat Fateh Ali Khan	11 December 2020
76	"Yaqeen"	Wajiha Naqvi	Wajiha Naqvi & Zara Madani	Wajiha Naqvi	11 December 2020
76	"Gal Sunn"	Ali Pervez Mehdi & Meesha Shafi	Ali Pervez Mehdi, Ahsan Pervez Mehdi & Zara Madani	Ali Pervez Mehdi, Ahsan Pervez Mehdi, Asim Raza & Manzoor Jhalla	11 December 2020
Episode 3
77	"Ishq Da Kukkar"	Sehar Gul Khan	Asim Raza	Asim Raza	17 December 2020
77	"Pardesiya"	Asim Raza	Asim Raza	Asim Raza	17 December 2020
77	"Har Funn Maula"	Sanam Marvi & Umair Jaswal	Shuja Haider	Asim Raza, Shah Abdul Latif Bhittai & Shuja Haider	17 December 2020
Episode 4
78	"Anbhol"	Sanam Marvi	Raag Aiman	Asim Raza	25 December 2020
78	"Megh"	Aizaz Sohail	Raag Megh	Raag Megh	25 December 2020
78	"Saari Dunya"	Bohemia	Bohemia	Bohemia & Asim Raza	25 December 2020

== Reception ==
Nescafé Basement's producer and mentor Xulfi commended Na Tuttya Ve's rap part, he said' "Liked the edgy rap Meesha Shafi!". Xulfi also lauded the performance of Mehdi Maloof in Dil Khirki, he said "Mehdi Maloof just know every word of what you wrote is so many's inner circle voice. It's mine too. Emoted with the song at every moment". Pakistani-American rapper Bohemia applauded Meesha Shafi's performance in Coke Studio 2020 opener, Na Tuttya Ve. Bohemia said, "Coke Studio is off to a great start and who knew Meesha Shafi could drop that fire!"

Indian singer Daler Mehndi praised the performance of Ali Pervez Mehdi in Gal Sunn. In a video message Daler Mehndi said, "I am ecstatic! Ali Pervez Mehdi has sung an amazing track in Coke Studio. Like Ali, Meesha Shafi has done a brilliant job with Gal Sunn as well".
