= Hamayoon Khan =

Hamayoon Khan ھمايون خان
- Birth name: Hamayoon Khan
- Born: Munjai, Khyber Pakhtunkhwa, Pakistan
- Origin: Peshawar, Pakistan
- Genres: Pop
- Occupation(s): Singer musician

Hamayoon Khan (Pashto: ھمايون خان) is a Pakistani Pashto musician and singer from Munjai, Lower Dir, Pakistan. He is also featured in Coke Studio Season 5.

Humayun has sung many songs for AVT Khyber. His popular songs include La me che zargi ta ranizde na ve and Gule Ro Ro Raza and many others. He also sung a folk song fusing it with pop music Larsha Pekhawar Ta originally sung by Gulnar Begum and Tora Bahraam Khaana in Coke Studio Season 5.
