= Arieb Azhar =

Pakistani musician

- اریب اظہر
- Born: Arieb Azhar; 30 June 1972 (age 53); Rawalpindi, Punjab, Pakistan
- Occupation: Musician
- Years active: 2006 - present
- Known for: Fusion of Pakistani Folk music with European music influences

Arieb Azhar (born 1972) is a Pakistani musician known for his renderings of traditional Sufi poetry and folk songs.

== Early life ==
Arieb Azhar was born on 30 June 1972 at Rawalpindi, Pakistan. He is the second son of Aslam Azhar, known as the father of Pakistani television due to his pioneering work in the early years of television in Pakistan.

Arieb Azhar was exposed to folk and classical Pakistani music as well as to western classical music at home.

He went to the Soviet Union at the age of 17 for studies but left soon, disillusioned by what he called the "corrupt system" pervasive there. He then spent 13 years of his life in Zagreb, Croatia (part of Yugoslavia at the time he migrated) where he became "completely integrated" and received his higher education in Indology and philosophy while performing music. He returned to Pakistan in 2004 to reconnect with his Pakistani roots. He is fluent in both Urdu and Punjabi languages as well as in Croatian.

== Musical career ==
His first album, Wajj, released in 2006, consisted of eight tracks, in which he vocalized the classical lyrics of Sufi poets like Khawaja Ghulam Farid, Bulleh Shah, Mian Muhammad Bakhsh, and even the contemporary lyrics of Sarmad Sehbai.

In 2012, Azhar was to travel to the UK to work together with an eminent English folk singer Martin Simpson with the aim of fusing Celtic and South Asian folk and classical music together to create a fusion on a 'soul' level. Arieb Azhar said in an interview in 2012, "Martin and I are trying to come up with music together in a very natural and organic way where we are playing off each other's music 'feel' ".

One of Arieb Azhar's interests is to mix urban and folk-based songs with lyrics from Pakistani Sufi poets while making use of other Eurasian influences he has absorbed along the way. Sometimes Arieb Azhar has been called a melting pot of musical and artistic influences.

He is also known for his Husn-e-Haqiqi song at Coke Studio (Pakistan).

== Popular songs ==
- Husn-e-Haqiqi Noor-e-Azal (2006)
- Na Raindee Hai
- Mori Araj Suno along with ghazal singer Tina Sani
- Loey Loey Bhar Lay Kurriye (lyrics by Mian Muhammad Bakhsh)
- Saif ul Malook
- Maye Ni Mein Kinnu Aakhan - lyrics by Shah Hussain (16th century Sufi poet)
- The Journey Within (documentary) (2015)
- Reclaiming Pakistan (a short documentary) (2016)
- Jindrhi Lutti
- Vehrhe Aawan Mere
- Nach Dila
