= Bari Nizami =

- Born: Sheikh Muhammad Safeer; 26 December 1946; Gojra, Punjab, British India
- Origin: Punjab, Pakistan
- Died: 14 May 1998 (aged 51) Faisalabad, Pakistan
- Genres: Qawwali, Folk
- Occupations: Songwriter and lyricist

Bari Nizami (Note: Punjabi: بری نظامی) was a lyricist from Punjab, Pakistan. Nusrat Fateh Ali Khan, Attaullah Khan Esakhelvi, Noor Jehan and Ghulam Ali sang his qawwalis and songs.

== Life ==
Barri Nizami (Birth Name: Sheikh Muhammad Safeer son of Sheikh Ghulam Muhammad) was born on 26 December 1946 in Gojra in Punjab, now in Toba Tek Singh District of Punjab, Pakistan.

He had become friends with Nusrat Fateh Ali Khan.

== Death ==
He died on 14 May 1998 due to lack of money for his treatment, as he was very poor.

== Bari Nizami songs by Nusrat Fateh Ali Khan ==
His most popular lyrics sung by the legend of Qawwali, Ustad Nusrat Fateh Ali Khan are below:

- Mast Mast Dam Mast Qalandar
- Yaara Dak Le Khooni Ankhiyan Noon
- Ranjha Te Mera Rabb Warga
- Dil Mar Jane Nu Ki Hoya Sajna
- Sunn Charkhe Di Mitthi Mitthi Kook
- Ho Jave Je Piyar
- Mailey Ne Vichar Jana
- Wadah Kar ke Sajjan Nahee Aya
- Gin Gin Taare Langhdiya Raata
- Kamli walay Muhammad tu Sadqa mein jan
- Kinna Sohna Teinu Rab Ne Banaya, Dil Karay Vekhda Rahwan

== Book ==
His poetry was published by a journalist jamil Siraj, Book name is Qadardaan.
