= Rostam Mirlashari =

- Born: رستم میرلاشاری; Rostam Mirlashari; 22 January 1961 (age 65); Zahedan, Sistan and Baluchestan province, Iran
- Origin: Lashar, Sistan and Baluchestan province, Iran
- Genres: Pop, Cultural music, electronica, Balochi, Bandari
- Occupations: Singer-songwriter, musician, record producer, film producer, author
- Instruments: Vocals, guitar, percussion
- Years active: 1994–present
- Website: Home page

Rostam Mirlashari (Persian: رستم میرلاشاری; born 22 January 1961 in Zahedan, Iran) is a Baloch singer from Iran, based in Sweden. He makes songs in Balochi, Kurdish, Persian, and some other Iranian languages.

== Background ==
Mirlashari grew up in Sistan-Baluchistan a province of Iran and was inspired by his parents Shah Soltan Shiranzaei and Hossein Mirlashari, who were both singers. Mirlashari studied civil engineering, worked in the building industry and was a director of a construction company in Minab. He is fluent in Persian, Swedish and English in addition to his native Balochi. According to Pakistan Idol, Mirlashari is known for being the prince of Balochi music.

== Music Career ==
In 1991, the political situation and fear for his life in Sistan and Baluchestan province convinced him to leave Iran and move to Sweden. In 1994, he established a band made up of a mix of musicians from Balochistan, Sweden, Africa and a few European countries. He called the band Golbang (Persian: گلبانگ, romanized: Golbāng). He is an active musician and considers himself to be a member of both the Swedish culture and the Baloch culture. Mirlashari also studied at The Royal College of Music in Stockholm.

He sang Laila O Laila, a Balochi folk song, on Season 6, Episode 4 of Coke Studio Pakistan, which aired on 21 December 2023. His performance received positive reviews from the public.

== Discography ==
- Omit, 1998
- Padik, 2000
- Golbang, 2000
- Saali nó, 2003
- "Sheida" (single), 2007
- Nouruz, EP, 2008
- Setareh, 2009
- "Hela Världen" (Anders Nyberg ensemble, a compilation album on which Rostam performs), 2009
- Morid (Golbang, EP) 2012
- Padik (Padik), 2013
- Morid (Golbang), 2016
- Pour-Afrigha (Feat Saeid Shanbehzadeh), 2017
- Washmalle (Single), 2021
- Rozhnak, 2022
- Pada (Golbang), 2023
- Durent (Single), 2025
- O Mani Doust Bia (Single), 2025
- O Kapout Sabzien (Single), 2025
- Warna/Javan (Single), 2026
