= Amanat Ali (singer) =

Pakistani singer (born 1987)

- Born: 10 October 1987 (age 38); Faisalabad, Punjab, Pakistan
- Origin: Pakistan
- Genres: Playback Singer, classical, pop
- Instrument: Vocal
- Years active: 2006–present
- Website: www.amanatali.net

Amanat Ali (Punjabi: امانت علی; born 10 October 1987) is a Pakistani classical, pop and playback singer. Amanat was featured as a playback singer in a few Indian and Pakistani films. such as Tamannah, Zinda Bhaag, Dostana and Bal Ganesh.

== Early years ==
Amanat Ali was born and raised in Faisalabad. He started his career in 2006 as a lead singer with Mekaal Hassan band, Amanat's debut album was Kohraam which was released in 2009 In collaboration with Fire Records. He also gave his voice as a playback singer in Bollywood movies, including Dostana for the songs "Khabar Nahin" and K C Boakdia's "Junoon". Amanat Ali is the son of singer Nazakat Ali. He is also the elder brother to popular singer and performer Aoun Ali Khan.

== Career ==
Amanat won the 3rd Mirchi Music Awards 2010 for best music album as his song "Thumri" from his debut album Kohram was nominated for the Best Indipop Song at Mirchi Music Awards in 2011. Amanat performs on songs ‘Ae Wattan Kay Sajeelay Jawanon’, ‘Haq Maujood’ and ‘Aisha’ in Coke Studio Season 3. He then sang ‘Chaa Rahi Kaali Ghata’ in Coke Studio Season 10 with Hina Nasrullah. Amanat has performed in various concerts and festivals.

Amanat was the winner of the Sa Re Ga Ma Pa Middle East Pakistan Challenge in 2007. He was a finalist and 2nd runner-up with 3,43,14,257 votes in the Indian reality show Sa Re Ga Ma Pa Challenge in 2007.

== Personal life ==
Amanat Ali is married to Pakistani designer, Sarah Manzoor. She is the daughter of Athar Manzoor, former Punjab Chief Technology Officer and Dr. Ghazli Manzoor, renowned Pakistani physician and surgeon. She is the niece of Mussarat Khosa (wife of Ex Governor Punjab and Ex PPP leader Latif Khosa). She is the first cousin of socialite Sehr Khosa.

Sarah Manzoor is a Canadian national and lives in Toronto. They married in 2017 to much speculation and fanfare. The couple has two daughters and one son.
