= Uss Paar =

Studio album by Qayaas
- Released: 23 April 2011
- Recorded: 2009–2010 at Root Gate Studio and S&M Studio in Islamabad, Pakistan
- Genre: Progressive rock Progressive metal Alternative rock
- Length: 1:03:47
- Label: BIY Records
- Producer: Khurram Waqar, Sarmad Abdul Ghafoor

Singles from Uss Paar
- 1. "Tanha" Released: 12 October 2009; 2. "Pukaar" Released: 16 October 2010; 3. "Umeed" Released: 2 January 2011; 4. "Shehrezade" Released: 8 May 2011

Uss Paar (Urdu: اس پار, literal English translation: "over there") is the debut studio album of the Pakistani progressive rock band Qayaas, released on 23 April 2011 on BIY Records.

The album was recorded and composed by founder, songwriter and lead guitarist Khurram Waqar. However, the release of the album earned the band a growing fan base in the underground music community and critical acclaim. Uss Paar is released to critical acclaim and commercial success. Five singles have been released in promotion of the album along with their music videos; "Tanha" in 2009, "Pukaar" in October 2010, "Umeed" and "Shehrezade" in 2011.

== Conception ==
=== Background ===
In June 2008, the band officially came to being and had started to jam, working on releasing an acoustic album. The first song the band worked on was "Pal", which was followed by the band's second song written "Tanha", which was initially an acoustic song to which distorted guitar riffs by Khurram and drumming by Fifu were added. After "Tanha", Qayaas made songs pretty easily and started to work on their debut studio album.

In 2009, after the band's formation, the band then went on releasing two songs "Umeed" and "Tanha" which were made exclusively made available for digital download at the band's website. They achieved fame with the release of the single "Tanha" in 2009, followed by the success of the song "Umeed" which became one of the most requested songs on City FM 89 when released in an audio CD with "Tanha". The release of the single began to create a cult following for the band. And on 12 October, the band went on releasing their debut music video for the song "Tanha", which ranked amongst the top 15 videos of 2009 by MTV Pakistan.

On 12 September 2010, Qayaas went on releasing their third single "Mera Wana", which later on featured on the compilation album, Metal Asia Compilation, composed of metal music from throughout Asia. The band then also went on releasing a music video teaser for the single. On 16 October, the band released their second music video and fourth single "Pukaar" which was dedicated to the 2010 Pakistan flood victims. On 12 December, Qayaas became the first band from Pakistan to win the "Best Rock Band" at the Rolling Stones-Jack Daniels annual rock award, held in New Delhi, India. The band had the honour of being chosen for the award from a nomination of 25 plus rock bands from Pakistan including some well known names. On 16 December, Qayaas went on performing at their first international concert at Hard Rock Cafe, New Delhi along with the band Half Step Down. On 27 December, three songs, "Inquilaab", "Khayaal" and "Pal", were given by the band to be part of the soundtrack to the film Waar directed by Bilal Lashari and starring Pakistani actor Shaan Shahid. On 2 January 2011, Qayaas released the music video of their single "Umeed" directed by Shandana Sarmad.

== Reception ==
Professional ratings
Review scores
Source	Rating
Instep Magazine	3.5/5 stars

On 23 April, Qayaas released their debut studio album Uss Paar, which was recorded at Root Gate Studios and released by BIY Records, throughout the country. The album was critically acclaimed and received many favourable reviews from critics, Instep magazine gave the album a 3.5/5 rating.

== Track listing ==
All music composed & arranged by Khurram Waqar except "Halaak" by Sarmad Abdul Ghafoor. All songs written by Umair Jaswal, those which are not are mentioned below.

Uss Paar
No.	Title	Length
1.	"Uss Paar"	5:49
2.	"Inquilaab"	5:40
3.	"Halaak"	4:00
4.	"Shehrezade"	4:09
5.	"Pal"	5:17
6.	"Umeed"	4:54
7.	"Charkha"	5:38
8.	"Ishq"	4:23
9.	"Teray Liye"	3:39
10.	"Monsoon"	6:18
11.	"Pukaar"	3:44
12.	"Tanha"	4:30
13.	"Mera Wana"	5:41
Total length:		01:03:47

== Personnel ==
All information is taken from the CD.

Qayaas

- Umair Jaswal – vocals
- Khurram Waqar – lead guitar
- Sarmad Abdul Ghafoor – lead guitar, rhythm guitar, keyboard
- Shaheryar Ghayas – bass guitar
- Salman 'Fifu' Rafique – drums, percussion

Production

- Produced by Khurram Waqar and Sarmad Abdul Ghafoor
- Recorded by Khurram Waqar and Sarmad Abdul Ghafoor
- Engineered & mixed by Khurram Waqar and Sarmad Abdul Ghafoor
- Recorded & mixed at Root Gate Studios and S&M Studios, Islamabad, Pakistan
- Mastered at S&M Studios
- Cover concept and design by Coffin Feeder (Kamran)
- Photography by Irfan Ahson
- Additional artwork by Mobeen Ansari, Sher Ali, Usman Malkani, UT, Shandana Sarmad & Harjas Singh
