= Qayaas =

Pakistani progressive rock band

Background information
- Origin: Islamabad, ICT, Pakistan
- Genres: Progressive rock, progressive metal, alternative rock
- Years active: 2008–2016
- Label: BIY
- Members: Umair Jaswal; Khurram Waqar; Rahail Siddiqui; Asfendyar Ahmad
- Past members: Sarmad Abdul Ghafoor; Salman "Fifu" Rafique
- Website: www.qayaas.com

Qayaas (Urdu: قیاس transl. Deliberation) was a progressive rock band from Islamabad, Pakistan, founded in 2008 by lead guitarist and songwriter, Khurram Waqar, who was soon joined by vocalists Umair Jaswal and Mohammad Hashir Ibrahim, guitarist Sarmad Abdul Ghafoor, bassist Shaheryar Ghayas and drummer Salman Rafique, completing the band's lineup.

The band is well known for being one of the few bands to have brought progressive rock music in Pakistan. They achieved fame with the release of the single "Tanha" in 2009, followed by the success of the song "Umeed" which became one of the most requested songs on CityFM89 when released in an audio CD with "Tanha". The release of the single began to create a cult following for the band.

In 2010, the song "Mera Wana" by the band featured on the compilation album, Metal Asia Compilation, composed of metal music from throughout Asia. Soon afterwards, the band released their second music video, "Pukaar", which was dedicated to the 2010 Pakistan flood victims, and then went on recording and releasing their debut studio album Uss Paar in 2011, which was recorded at Root Gate Studios and released by BIY Records, throughout the country. The album was critically acclaimed and received many favourable reviews from critics. The success of the album led the band to become the first band from Pakistan to be invited to perform at one of the biggest and most prestigious music festivals in America called SXSW.

Qayaas has also won many awards and allocations, including the "Best Rock Band" award at the Rolling Stones-Jack Daniels awards in 2010. The band's song "Inquilaab" made it to the semifinals of the International Songwriting Competition (ISC) out of 15,000 entries from all over the globe.

== History ==
=== Formation (2008) ===
Qayaas started when Khurram Waqar first saw Umair Jaswal performing at a jam with his band SilverSmoke at his studio, Root Gate Studio, in Islamabad. For Khurram, who was already in a band called kNuMB, things weren't progressing, due to the lead vocalist of the band living out of the country. Although kNuMB had enough material for an album, Khurram decided to put it on a hold and then contacted Umair and invited him to work on material that he had written, which initially started out as an acoustic EP, later turned into a full-length studio album. The line up was completed when other members came into the scene. First, Khurram recruited Umair Jaswal on vocals, then Sarmad Abdul Ghafoor, who previously played for Rung, on rhythms, bassist Shaheryar Ghayas, and drummer Salman 'Fifu' Rafique, the latter who were both playing for the band Surge at that time.

Khurram came up with the name Qayaas. Upon formation, lead guitarist Khurram Waqar said, "Qayaas literally translated as "deliberation" is not only the name of our band but the essence that encapsulates the entire philosophy behind our music. The idea or feeling taking birth in one band member's mind is developed and brought to fruition by collective deliberation or Qayaas by the whole band, explained the lead guitarist, and the sole founder of the band, Khurrum Waqar. Five different people, their different moods, outlooks and music philosophies harmoniously blend to form compositions that reflect the true spirit and creative energy of our band; unadulterated in this wondrous journey by commercial concerns or other shortcuts."

In June 2008, the band officially came to being and had started to jam, working on releasing an acoustic album. The first song the band worked on was "Pal", which was followed by the band's second song written "Tanha", which was initially an acoustic song to which distorted guitar riffs by Khurram and drumming by Fifu were added. While Umair Jaswal always had a good voice, it was lead guitarist, Khurrum Waqar, who coached him to gain his full potential. After "Tanha", Qayaas made songs pretty easily and started to work on their debut studio album.

=== Rise to fame (2009-2010) ===
In 2009, after the band's formation, the band then went on releasing two songs "Umeed" and "Tanha" which were made exclusively made available for digital download at the band's website. They achieved fame with the release of the single "Tanha" in 2009, followed by the success of the song "Umeed" which became one of the most requested songs on City FM 89 when released in an audio CD with "Tanha". The release of the single began to create a cult following for the band. And on 12 October, the band went on releasing their debut music video for the song "Tanha", which ranked amongst the top 15 videos of 2009 by MTV Pakistan. On 9 November, Qayaas performed live at ATV show Boom Online.

India on 16 December 2010. Visible from left to right are; vocalist Umair Jaswal and lead guitarist Khurram Waqar. On 12 September 2010, Qayaas went on releasing their third single "Mera Wana", which later on featured on the compilation album, Metal Asia Compilation, composed of metal music from throughout Asia. The band then went on releasing a music video teaser for the single and said "This is our statement against the so called "War on Terror". It is ironic that they kill civilians including women and young children through drone strikes yet talk about making this world a peaceful place. We as a nation are going through a tough time. There is need for motivation but that can be achieved by coming out of our state of denial and accepting the facts on ground. For once, this should not be politicized further as it has certainly not helped. We need to take into account a common man's view and expand upon it. In the end, they can do whatever they want but we are here and we are not going anywhere."

On 16 October, the band released their second music video and fourth single "Pukaar" which was dedicated to the 2010 Pakistan flood victims. On 12 December, Qayaas became the first band from Pakistan to win the "Best Rock Band" at the Rolling Stones-Jack Daniels annual rock award, held in New Delhi, India. The band had the honour of being chosen for the award from a nomination of more than 25 rock bands from Pakistan including some well known names. On 16 December, Qayaas went on performing at their first international concert at Hard Rock Cafe, New Delhi along with the band Half Step Down. On 23 December, Qayaas confirmed their plans about working on compiling their English material in the form of an album. On 27 December, three songs, "Inquilaab", "Khayaal" and "Pal", were given by the band to be part of the soundtrack to the film Waar directed by Bilal Lashari and starring Pakistani actor Shaan Shahid.

=== Success (2011- 2015) ===
On 2 January 2011, Qayaas released the music video of their single "Umeed" directed by Shandana Sarmad. On 23 April, Qayaas released their debut studio album Uss Paar, which was recorded at Root Gate Studios and released by BIY Records, throughout the country. The album was critically acclaimed and received many favourable reviews from critics. On 8 May, Qayaas released the music video of their fifth single "Shehrezade", from their debut album, directed by Omair Hyder. On 12 June, the band re-released a, story version, music video for their single "Umeed", directed by Shandana Sarmad who also directed the previous music video for the single. In November 2012, Sarmad Abdul Ghafoor, Shahryar Ghayas and Salman Rafique left the band for personal reasons.

== Awards and nominations ==
Qayaas won the "Best Rock Band" award at the Rolling Stones-Jack Daniels awards in 2010, becoming the first band from Pakistan to win the award. The band had the honour of being chosen for the award from a nomination of more than 25 rock bands from Pakistan which also included some well-known names.

== Discography ==
Studio albums

- Uss Paar (2011)

Singles

- "Heal" (2012)
- "Charkha Nolakha" with Atif aslam at Coke Studio Pakistan in Season 5 (2012)
- "Cut My Wings" (2013)

== Band members ==
Current members

- Umair Jaswal – vocals (2008–2015)
- Khurram Waqar – lead guitar (2008–2015)
- Rahail Siddiqui – bass guitar (2014–2015)
- Asfendyar Ahmad – drums, percussion (2014–2015)

Former members

- Sarmad Abdul Ghafoor – lead guitar, rhythm guitar (2008–2012)
- Shaheryar Ghayas – bass guitar (2008–2012)
- Salman 'Fifu' Rafique – drums, percussion (2008–2012)
- Shahzad Hameed – bass guitar (2012–2014)
- Kamran Farooque- drums, percussion (2012–2014)

== See also ==
- List of Pakistani music bands
