= Khatir Afridi =

Pashtun poet

- خاطر افریدی
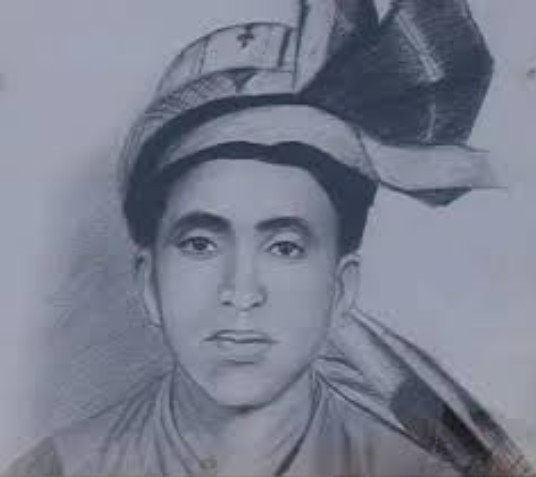
- Khatir Afridi
- Born: 1929
- Died: 1968 (aged 38–39)
- Occupations: Writer; Poet
- Writing career
- Language: Pashto, Urdu
- Genre: Poem

Khatir Afridi (Pashto: خاطر آفریدی) (1929 – August 24, 1968) was born as Meesri Khan (Pashto: مصری خان) in Landi Kotal District Khyber in the province of Khyber Pakhtunkhwa. He was a Pashto language poet from Pakistan.

== Life ==
He was born in the Zakha Khel tribe in Saddu Khel village of Khyber agency. He was a gardener by profession at a nearby high school (now a F.C. fort). He never went to school for formal education. He was a close friend of Ashna.

His grave is located in the Saddu Khel graveyard, which has a small temple and a poem written on his grave: "Che pa qabar may tery gy Hudy da para : Lag sha mata hapa newaly za ba mar yam"

He wrote songs that became popular in Pakistan and Afghanistan. He joined a poetry society where he got guidance from Hamza Shinwari and Nazir Shinwari. He had Tuberculosis for ten years and died at the age of 39, leaving behind a son who compiled his father's work into a volume with help from his cousin.
