= Rizwan-Muazzam Qawwali Group =

Pakistani qawwali group

Rizwan-Muazzam (Urdu: رضوان ـ معظم) Qawwali is a Pakistani Qawwali group, headed by Nusrat Fateh Ali Khan's nephews, Rizwan and Muazzam.

The brothers, sons of Mujahid Mubarak Ali Khan, have been performing together as Rizwan-Muazzam Qawwali Group since the late 1990s. They performed at their first major concert in 1998 at the Womad Rivermead festival in Reading, England. They have played at WOMAD Festival in UK for several years since 1998, and have recorded several albums.

== Early life and education ==
Brothers Rizwan and Muazzam come from a direct family line of Qawwali music that spans over five centuries. Their grandfather, Mubarak Ali Khan, was an uncle of Nusrat Fateh Ali Khan, and taught Nusrat the art of qawwali vocal music. The brothers studied under the supervision of their father, Mujahid Mubarak Ali Khan, who died in 1996, and were then tutored by their uncle Nusrat.

== Career ==
Rizwan-Muazzam Qawwali Group is made up of the two lead-singing brothers, Rizwan and Muazzam; five secondary singers who lead the choral response with vigorous hand clapping; two harmonium players; and a tabla player. They perform in traditional Qawwali style - sitting on the ground rather than on seats - which they believe brings them closer to God.

They have given many joint performances at the Coke Studio in Pakistan in collaboration with various other musicians, including Shazia Manzoor, and became very popular in Pakistan.

They played at the annual world music festival WOMAD in Reading, England, in 1998. The group performed at WOMADelaide (the edition of WOMAD taking place in Adelaide, South Australia) in 2003, and are scheduled to perform there again on the long weekend of 11-13 March. As of 2023 the group includes the two brothers, along with seven male artists on harmonium, chorus, and hand percussion.

== Discography ==
Day Of Colours (Real World Records, 2004) is an album of traditional qawwali, recorded in four days in a tiny studio in Lahore, with songs in Persian, Urdu, and Punjabi languages. It includes the qawwali "Sayyedo-Sarwer Muhammad" (light of my life), written by the 13th-century Persian poet and mystic, Rumi.

Other albums include:

- Attish: The Hidden Fire (WOMAD Select, 1998)
- Sacrifice To Love (Narada, 1999)
- A Better Destiny (Real World Records, 2001)
- People’s Colony No I (Real World Records, 2001)
- Sufi Sama (Tabaruq Records, 2007)
- At the Feet of the Beloved (Real World Records, 2025)

== See also ==
- List of Pakistani music bands
