= Tina Sani =

Pakistani singer

Tina Sani ٹینا ثانی
- Born: Tina Sani Dhaka, East Pakistan (Present day Dhaka, Bangladesh)
- Genres: Classical music singing Ghazal singing
- Occupations: Singer television performer

Tina Sani is a Pakistani female singer famous for her classical and semi-classical Urdu Ghazals. She is considered to be one of the finest ghazal singers of her time and is widely regarded as the "Nightingale of Ghazal".

== Early life ==
Tina Sani was born in Dhaka, which was at the time part of East Pakistan. The family moved to Kabul for a few years, where her father, Nasir Sani, worked for an oil company, before moving to Karachi, where after graduating from the Karachi American School, she went on to study commercial art. She was trained in classical music by Ustad Nizamuddin Khan, son of Ustad Ramzan Khan of Delhi gharana and Ustad Chand Amrohvi. Tina also received special training from ghazal maestro Mehdi Hassan.

== Career ==
Tina Sani began working for an advertising agency in 1977. She was involved in all the creative aspects of advertising business, including listening to and evaluating the music that is an integral part of advertising. Tina also taught at the Karachi American School in the art department.

=== Singing career ===
She entered the professional world of singing in 1980, when producer Ishrat Ansari introduced her on TV in a youth programme titled 'Tarang' hosted by Alamgir.

She was influenced by renowned ghazal singers from South Asia like Mehdi Hassan, Malika Pukhraj, Begum Akhtar, Mukhtar Begum and Farida Khanum but has created her own style of singing. She gained much acclaim in Pakistan and India by singing the poetry of Faiz Ahmed Faiz including poems like Bahaar aayi and Bol ke lab azad hain terey composed by Arshad Mehmood. She renders poetry of contemporary poets with complete ease and is equally at home singing works of famous poets like Zauq, Ghalib, Mir Taqi Mir and Jalaluddin Rumi.

Her rendition of Iqbal's Shikwa Jawab-e-Shikwa has been noted by reviewers. It is one of the longest piece of poetry she has performed.

More recently Tina Sani sang Rumi's beginning verses of the Mathnavi for Coke Studio (Pakistan) to bring verses of the 13th century mystic poet's Persian verses in Urdu language.

Tina Sani was invited as a guest judge in the first Pakistan Idol TV show.

Tina Sani was part of Lahore music meet, 2016. She shared her music journey in a session named "Classical Music Appreciation". Sani also discussed the current situation and lack of classical music from Pakistani music industry. She praised role of television in supporting them to continue practising music.

She has sung many songs for the Pakistani TV and film industry, such as the OST for Hum TV's soap 'Choti Si Ghalat Fehmi' and Ho Mann Jahan's 'Khush Piya Wassen'. She has also sung the OST for PTV's 'Moorat', Hum TV's Bari Aapa and ARY Zindagi's 'Bahu Begum'.

Her top five favourite songs are

1. بابل مورا – a song by K.L. Saigal
2. کورا کاغذ تھا یہ من میرا – a song from film Aradhana by Kishore Kumar
3. آپ جیسا کوئی میری زندگی میں آئے تو بات بن جائے – a song by Nazia Hasan from 1980 film Qurbani
4. کھڑی نیم کے نیچے – a folk song by Pakistani folk singer Mai Bhaagi
5. کوئی تو ہے جو نظامِ ہستی چلا رہا ہے وہی خدا ہے – a Hamd song by Nusrat Fateh Ali Khan, written by Muzaffar Warsi

== Awards ==
- The Pride of Performance Award in 2004 – Government of Pakistan
- Performance Recognition Award (2011) by President of India during centennial celebrations of Faiz Ahmed Faiz
- Lifetime Achievement Award from Lux Style Awards in 2017
