= Zoe Viccaji =

Pakistani musician

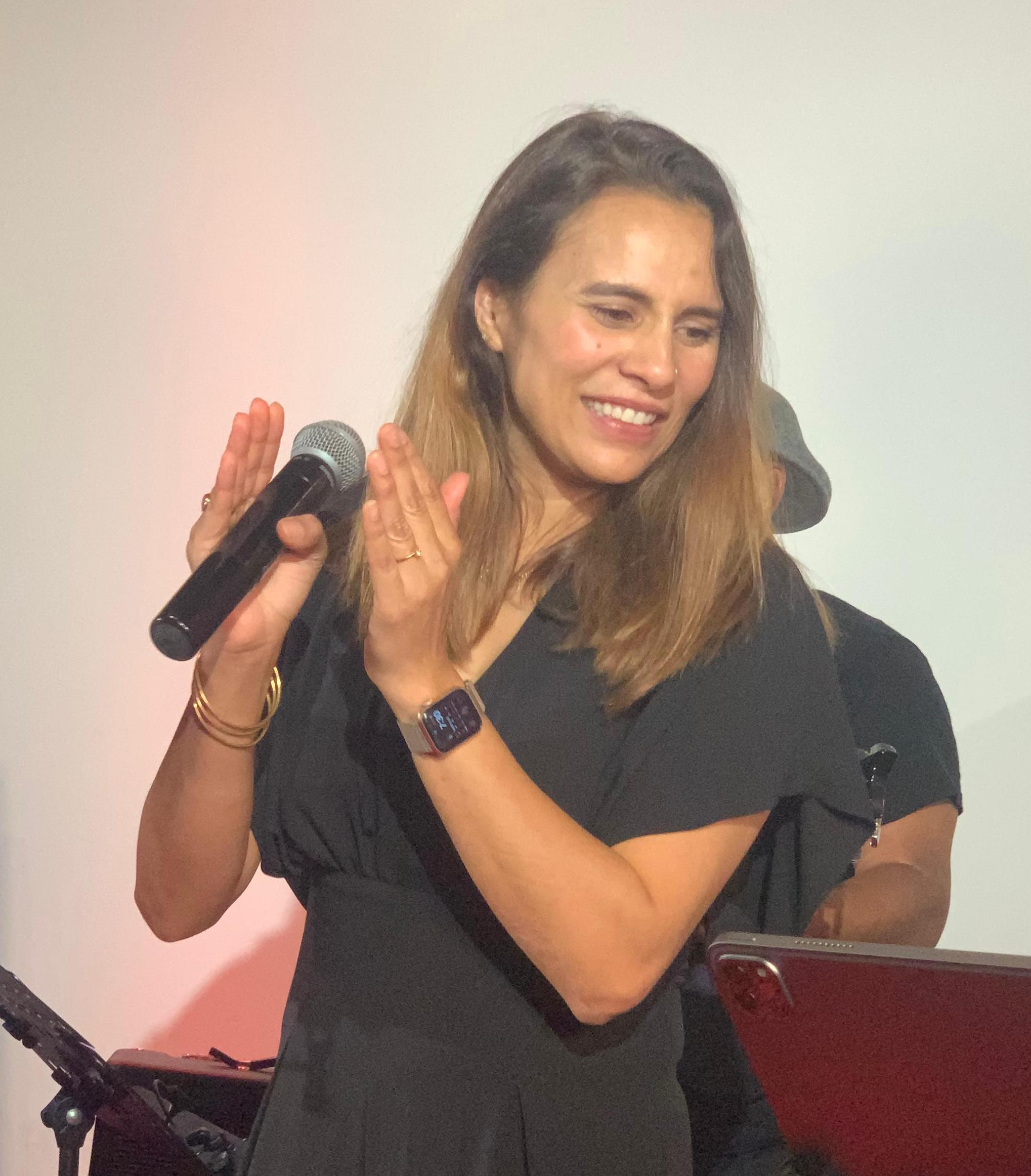
- Born: October 25, 1983 (age 42); Kharian, Punjab, Pakistan
- Education: Hamilton College
- Occupations: Singer-songwriter; Actress
- Years active: 2009–present
- Spouse: Kamal Khan (m. 2018)
- Relatives: Rachel Viccaji (sister)
- Musical career
- Genres: Pop; Rock; Jazz
- Instruments: Vocals; Guitar
- Years active: 2009–present
- Labels: Universal Music Group; Coke Studio
- Website: www.zoeviccaji.com

Zoe Viccaji (Urdu: زوئی وکاجی) (born 1983) is a Pakistani singer-songwriter and actress from Karachi. She began her career as a backing vocalist at Coke Studio and later moved on to becoming one of the featured artists. Viccaji has released one studio album which received various accolades.

== Early life ==
Zoe Viccaji was born in Kharian, Punjab, Pakistan, to Adi Viccaji and Lynettee Viccaji, a Parsi father and Christian mother. She was raised in Karachi, Pakistan. According to Zoe, she has been playing guitar and writing her own songs since the age of fifteen. Singer Rachel Viccaji is her younger sister.

== Personal life ==
Viccaji got married on December 23, 2018, to producer and director Kamal Khan in Karachi, Pakistan. Her sister, Rachel Viccaji and fellow Coke Studio backup singer and actress Sanam Saeed, were among the bridesmaids in the traditional white wedding. The couple had another event the next day on the traditional Pakistani side of things.

== Career ==
Zoe started her career at the age of seventeen by joining a local band named Ganda Bandas. A few years later she moved to the United States where she studied in Hamilton College, New York. She also worked in the stage musicals Mamma Mia! and Chicago, both alongside Sanam Saeed. After returning to Pakistan, she released her debut single "Thinking About You" in 2009. She joined Coke Studio in 2010 and collaborated with Strings and Bilal Khan and released the singles "Mera Bichra Yaar" and "Anjane" featuring Strings and Bilal Khan. "Mera Bichra Yaar" was nominated at the 11th Lux Style Awards for Song of the Year.

Zoe released her debut album Dareeche in September 2014 under Universal Music India. In 2015, it won the Best Mixed Album award at the Indian Recording Arts (IRA) in India and Lux Style Award for Best Album in Pakistan. The album spawned a single “Phir Mili Tanhai”. Zoe stated in an interview that “Phir Mili Tanhai” was one of the first songs she wrote and was inspired by her real relationship. "Phir Mili Tanhai was one of the very first songs I wrote. In fact it’s a marker of the period when I turned to songwriting in the first place. I was going through my first major breakup with someone who I had been with for a very long time."

In 2013, Zoe made a cameo appearance in the film Good Morning Karachi as Salon Bride.

== Awards and nominations ==
Year	Nominee / work	Award	Result
2012	"Mera Bichra Yaar"	11th Lux Style Award of Song of the Year	Nominated
2013	"Hain Yeh Silsilay"	12th Lux Style Award for Best Original Soundtrack	Nominated
2014	"Jab Koi"	ARY Film Award for Best Female Playback Singer	Nominated
2014	Zoe Viccaji	4th Pakistan Media Award for Best Singer (Female)	Won
2015	Dareeche	Best Mixed Album Award at IRA	Won
2015	Dareeche	14th Lux Style Award for Best Album	Won

== Filmography ==
Year	Film	Notes
2013	Good Morning Karachi	Salon Bride
2014	The Journey Within	Cameo Appearance
2018	Cake	Cameo Appearance

== Discography ==
=== Albums ===
Sr.No.	Album	Producer	Year
1.	Dareeche	Zoe Viccaji	2014

Track listing
No.	Title	Length
1.	"Jis Nay Bhi Aana Hai"	3:48
2.	"Phir Mili Tanhai"	4:56
3.	"Sau Dafa"	3:26
4.	"Kaisay Yeh Hua"	3:46
5.	"Raat Gaye"	4:26
6.	"Keep me in Your Memories"	3:50
7.	"Mera Bichra Yaar"	2:56
8.	"Ab Aao Na"	4:40
9.	"Neend Ati Nahin"	4:23
Total length:		00:35:21

=== Singles ===
- "Tanhaiyan"
- "Jhoom"
- "Ho Jao Aazad"
- "Ruk Tau Zara"
- "Hum Har Qadam Aagay Hon" (All Stars Grand Finale Song)
- "The Time Has Come"
- "Josh"
- "Yeh Dil Kiyun Mera"
- "Jis Nay Bhi Aana Hai, Aik Din Jaana Hai"
- "Thinking About You"
- "Alvida (Feat. Zohaib)"
- "Bichra Yaar (Feat. Strings)"
- "Bolo (Feat. Zohaib)"
- "Breathe in Breathe Out"
- "Jab Koi"
- "Jo Chaho"
- "Kaisay Yeh Hua"
- "Street Signs (Feat. Aamir Zaki and Maaz)"
- "Vamp (Feat. Omar Farooq)"
- "Weave a Sweet Dream"
- "Ishq Kinara (Feat. Sumru Agiryuruyen)"
- "Baray Pyar Se Samjhaen"
- "Ashiqi Angar (Irfan Ali Taj Feat. Zoe Viccaji)"

==== Coke Studio ====
- Senraan Ra Baairya - Asif Hussain Samraat Ft. Zoe Viccaji
- Jaana
- Raat Gaey
- Ishq Kinara (Zoe Viccaji & Sumru Agiryuriyen)
