= List of awards and nominations received by Ali Zafar =

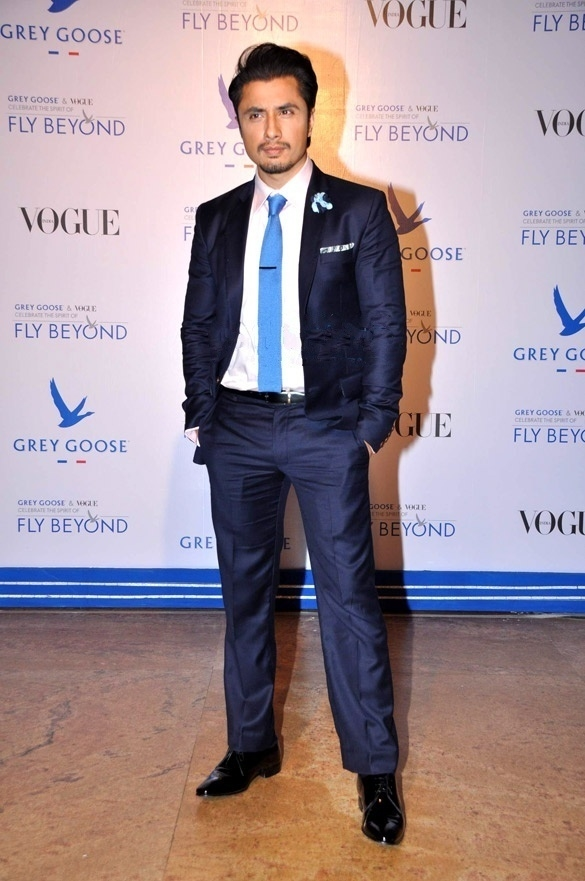
- Ali Zafar at 2014 India's Fly Beyond Awards.
Awards	Wins	Nominations
Indus Music Awards	3	0
Lux Style Awards	6	3
Asian Bollywood Music Awards	1	0
MTV Style Awards	3	0
Zee Cine Awards	0	1
Filmfare Awards	0	1
IIFA Awards	0	1
Screen Awards	0	1
Style Awards	1	1
Stardust Awards	1	2
Pakistan Media Awards	0	4
ARY Film Awards	1	0
Hum Awards	0	1
Karawood Film Festival	1	0
HT Most Stylish Awards	1	0
Hum Style Awards	1	1
Internat. Pakistan Prestige Awards	0	1
- Totals (Note: Certain award groups do not simply award one winner. They recognize several different recipients, have runners-up, and have a third place. Since this is a specific recognition and is different from losing an award, runner-up mentions are considered wins in this award tally. For simplification and to avoid errors, each award in this list has been presumed to have had a prior nomination.)
Awards	34
Nominations	20

Ali Zafar is a Pakistani singer-songwriter, model, actor, producer, screenwriter and painter. He has received five Lux Style Awards and a Filmfare Award nomination.

His song "Channo" topped music charts and earned him several awards for Best Music Album and Best Artist. His performance in the film Tere Bin Laden garnered critical appreciations and earned him several nominations in the Best Male Debut category, including Filmfare.

Zafar has been voted "Sexiest Asian Man on the Planet" five times in a worldwide poll by the British newspaper, Eastern Eye. He won this poll in successive years between 2012 and 2014, and twice more in 2018 and 2019. In 2020, he was awarded the 'Pride of Performance' by the Pakistani government.

== Indus Music Awards ==
Zafar has won 3 awards in the categories of 'Best Debut Artist', 'Best Album' and 'Best Pop Artist'.

Year	Album	Nomination	Category	Result	Ref.
2004	Huqa Pani	Full album	Best Debut Artist	Won	
2004	Huqa Pani	Full album	Best Album	Won	
2005	Huqa Pani	Full album	Best Pop Artist	Won	

== Lux Style Awards ==
The Lux Style Awards is an annual Pakistani award ceremony. The awards celebrate "style" in the Pakistani entertainment industry. It is the oldest event dedicated to the nation's cinema, television, fashion, music, and film industries. Zafar has won six awards with three other nominations.

Year	Album/Film	Nomination	Category	Result	Ref.
2004	Huqa Pani	Full album	Best Album	Won	
2007	Masty	Full album	Best Album	Nominated	
2007	N/A		Youth Icon Award	Won	
2012	Jhoom	Full album	Best Album	Won	
2012	Jhoom	"Jhoom"	Song of the Year	Nominated	
2013	Zindagi Gulzar Hai	"Zindagi Gular Hai"	Best Original Soundtrack	Won	
2016	CokeStudio8	"Rockstar"	Song of the Year	Won	
2019	Teefa in Trouble	"Teefa"	Best Actor (Critics' choice)	Nominated	
2019	Teefa in Trouble	"Teefa"	Best Actor (Viewers' choice)	Won	

== Asian Bollywood Music Awards ==
Zafar has won an award for 'Best Pop Music Album in Pakistan'.

Year	Album	Nomination	Category	Result	Ref.
2005	Huqa Pani	Full album	Best Pop Music Album in Pakistan	Won	

== MTV Style Awards ==
Zafar has won three awards in the categories of 'Best Male Artist', 'Most Stylish Artist' and 'Best Male Singer'.

Year	Album/Film	Nomination	Category	Result	Ref.
2008	Masty	Full album	Best Male Artist	Won	
2008	N/A		Most Stylish Artist	Won	
2009	Zindagi Gulzar Hai	"Zindagi Gulzar Hai"	Best Male Singer	Won	

== Zee Cine Awards ==
Zee Cine Award (also known as ZCA) is an awards ceremony for the Hindi film industry. They were instituted in November 1997 to award "Excellence in cinema – the democratic way".

Year	Film	Nomination	Category	Result	Ref.
2011	Tere Bin Laden	Ali Hassan (character)	Zee Cine Award for Best Male Debut	Nominated	

== Filmfare Awards ==
The Filmfare Awards honour artistic and technical excellence in the Hindi-language film industry of India. The Filmfare ceremony is one of the most famous film events in India.

Year	Film	Nomination	Category	Result	Ref.
2011	Tere Bin Laden	Ali Hassan (character)	Filmfare Award for Best Male Debut	Nominated	

== IIFA Awards ==
The International Indian Film Academy Awards (also known as the IIFA Awards) are presented annually and honour both the artistic and technical excellence of professionals in Bollywood. Zafar has been nominated once.

Year	Film	Nomination	Category	Result	Ref.
2011	Tere Bin Laden	Ali Hassan (character)	IIFA Award for Star Debut of the Year – Male	Nominated	

== Screen Awards ==
The Screen Awards is an annual awards ceremony held in India honouring professional excellence in Bollywood. Zafar has been nominated once.

Year	Film	Nomination	Category	Result	Ref.
2011	Tere Bin Laden	Ali Hassan (character)	Screen Award for Best Male Debut	Nominated	

== Style Awards ==
Zafar has won an award and one nomination.

Year	Album	Nomination	Category	Result	Ref.
2011	Jhoom	"Jhoom"	Song of the Year	Won	
2011	N/A		Personality of the Year	Nominated	

== Stardust Awards ==
The Stardust Awards was an award ceremony for Hindi movies, sponsored by Stardust magazine. Zafar has won an award with two nominations.

Year	Film	Nomination	Category	Result	Ref.
2011	Tere Bin Laden	Ali Hassan (character)	Stardust Award for Superstar of Tomorrow – Male	Nominated	
2012	Mere Brother Ki Dulhan	Luv Agnihotru (character)	Stardust Award for Superstar of Tomorrow – Male	Won	
2012	Mere Brother Ki Dulhan	"Madhubala" (song)	Stardust Award for New Musical Sensations – Male	Nominated	

== Pakistan Media Awards ==
The Pakistan Media Awards (also known as The PMA) are awards given annually for achievements in radio, TV, film, and theatre. The award is a knight statuette with a star on its chest, officially named the Pakistan Media Award of Merit. Zafar has been nominated four times.

Year	Album/Film	Nomination	Category	Result	Ref.
2012	Love Mein Ghum	"Love Mein Ghum"	Best Playback Singer	Nominated	
2012	Jhoom	"Jhoom"	Best Singer Male	Nominated	
2014	Zindagi Gulzar Hai	"Zindagi Gulzar Hai"	Best Singer Male	Nominated	
2014	Zindagi Gulzar Hai	"Zindagi Gulzar Hai"	Best Drama Original Soundtrack	Nominated	

== ARY Film Awards ==
The ARY Film Awards (commonly known as The AFAs) is an annual Pakistani awards ceremony, honouring the cinematic achievements of the film industry. Winners are awarded the ARY Film Award of Merit (also known as the AFA trophy). The awards, first presented in Karachi in 2014, are overseen and organized by ARY Digital Network and Entertainment Channel. Zafar has won an award.

Year	Category	Result	Ref.
2014	ARY Film Award for International Icon of the Year	Won	

== Hum Awards ==
Hum Awards are annual accolades bestowed by the Hum Network Limited in recognition of excellence in television, fashion and music within Pakistan. Winners are awarded the Hum Award of Merit. The first award ceremony was held in 2013 at the Karachi Expo Centre. Zafar has been nominated once.

Year	Film	Nomination	Category	Result	Ref.
2014	Zindagi Gulzar Hai	"Zindagi Gulzar Hai"	Hum Award for Best Original Soundtrack	Nominated	

== Karawood Film Festival ==
Year	Category	Result	Ref.
2015	Most Versatile Artist	Won	

== HT Most Stylish Awards ==
Year	Category	Result	Ref.
2015	Most Stylish Import	Won	

== Hum Style Awards ==
Year	Category	Result	Ref.
2016	Most Stylish Male Performer	Won	
2017	Most Stylish Male Performer	Nominated	

== International Pakistan Prestige Awards ==
Year	Category	Result	Ref.
2017	Style Icon of the Year Male	Nominated	

== Other awards and honours ==
Year	Awards/Honours	Category	Ref.
2012	Eastern Eye	Sexiest Asian Man on the Planet	
2013	Eastern Eye	Sexiest Asian Man on the Planet	
2014	Eastern Eye	Sexiest Asian Man on the Planet	
2018	Eastern Eye	Sexiest Asian Man on the Planet	
2018	Pakistan International Film Festival	Artist for Peace	
2018	United For Pakistan Independence Day	Pride of Pakistan	
2019	Shaan-e-Pakistan Achievement in Music Awards	Music Icon of the Generation	
2019	Eastern Eye	Sexiest Asian Man on the Planet	
2020	Government of Pakistan	Pride of Performance	
2021	Government of Pakistan	Pride of Performance	
2023	Distinctive International Arab Festivals Awards	Pakistani singer of the Year	

== See also ==
- List of awards and nominations received by Atif Aslam
- List of awards and nominations received by Rahat Fateh Ali Khan
- Ali Zafar discography
