= Ali Zafar discography =

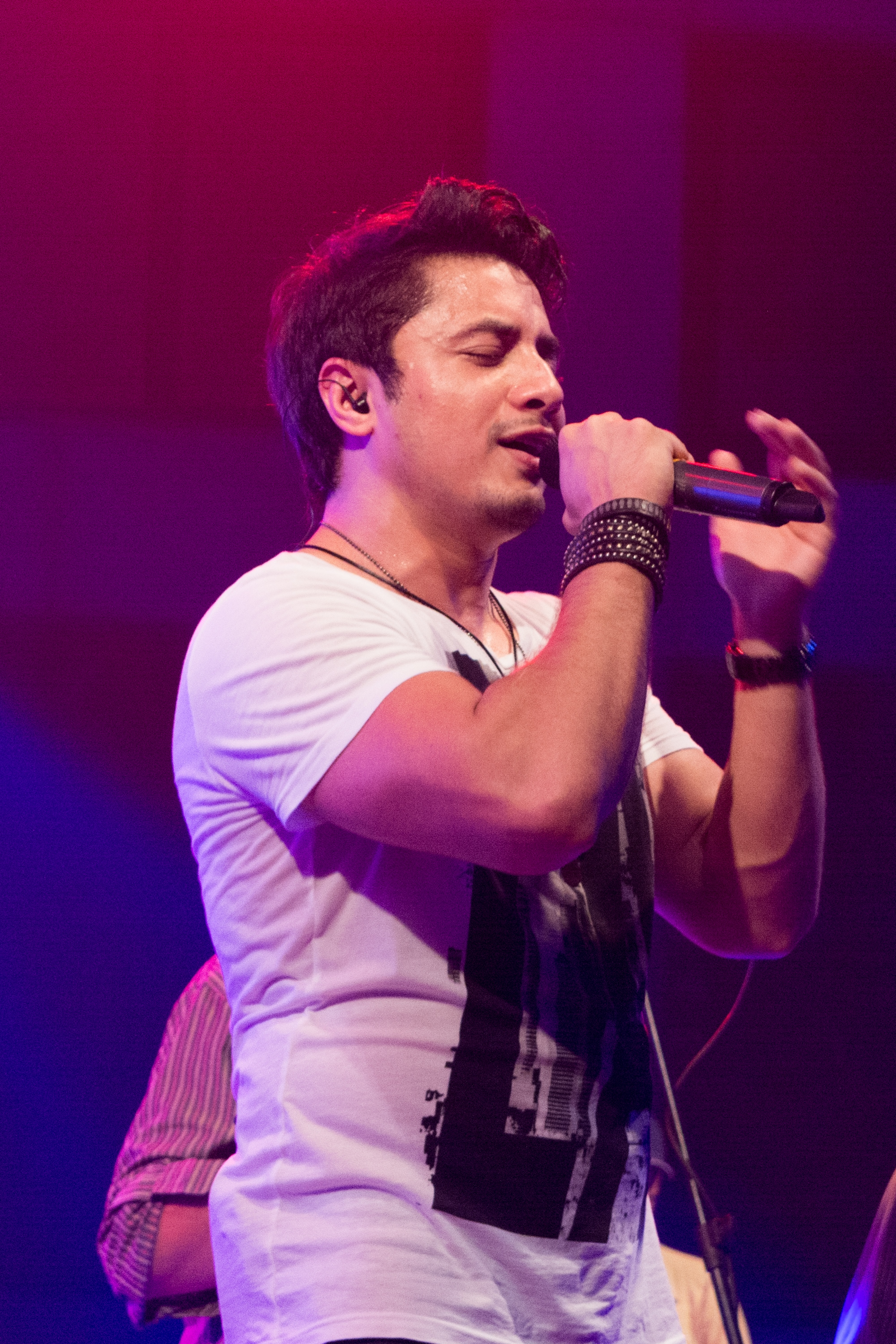
- Ali Zafar at a concert in 2015
- Studio albums: 4
- Soundtrack albums: 3
- Coke Studio Pakistan: 17
- Pakistan Super League: 5
- ISPR: 5

Ali Zafar is a Pakistani pop and rock singer-songwriter. He debuted as a singer with song "Channo" in 2003, and sang his first movie song "Jugnuon Se Bhar De Aanchal" in the same year. He has released four studio albums and has composed three soundtrack albums. He has sung for Hindi cinema from 2010 to 2016. His discography also includes songs for Pakistani films and dramas. He also has recorded many singles, covers, poetries, and has sung for TV commercials and brands, notably Coke Studio Pakistan, ISPR, and Pakistan Super League.

In 2011, Zafar named his independent record label as Alif Records. In September 2015, he established a studio in his new house and named it Lightingale Studios. In February 2020, he launched Lightingale Records, a music label with an intention to mentor and highlight the talents of new artists.

== Albums ==
=== Studio albums ===
Studio album
Year	Title	Genre	Label	Tracks
2003	Huqa Pani	Pop	Pan Rhythm, Empire	10
2006	Masty	Pop Rock	Frankfinn, Fire	9
2011	Jhoom	Sufi Pop	YRF, Alif, Coke Studio	12
2025	Roshni	Acoustic pop, deep house	Lightingale	12

=== Soundtrack albums ===
Soundtrack album
Year	Title	Genre	Label	Tracks
2012	London, Paris, New York	Filmi Soundtrack	Sony	7
2014	Total Siyapaa	Filmi Soundtrack	T-Series	5
2018	Teefa in Trouble	Filmi Soundtrack	Lightingale, Junglee	6

=== Extended play ===
Extended play
Year	Title	Genre	Label	Tracks
2023	#IDontWannaTalk		Lightingale	1. "Akhiyaan"; 2. "Raat Din" with Danny Zee; 3. "Raati Chann" with Buggs & Ozzy; 4. "Chal Dil Mere" (Lo-Fi Mix) (Note: Reprise from Huqa Pani); 5. "Chori Chori"

- Compilation album: Dhanak Kay Rang (2020) (Note: by ISPR)

== Soundtracks ==
=== Films ===
==== Pakistani films ====
Year	Song	Film	Music	Lyrics	Co-singer(s)	Notes
2003	"Jugnuon Se Bhar Le Aanchal"	Shararat	Wajahat Attray	Aqeel Ruby	Shabnam Majid	Zafar's solo version was added in Huqa Pani.
2011	"Love Mein Ghum"	Love Mein Ghum	Waqar Ali			
2016	"Jungle Medley"	Lahore Se Aagey	Shiraz Uppal	various artists		"Channo"
2022	"Ghabrana Nahi Hai"	Ghabrana Nahi Hai	Shuja Haider			
2022	"Dil Karey"	Quaid-e-Azam Zindabad	Shani Arshad	Khawaja Danish	Nish Asher	
2023	"Huey Tum Ajnabi"	Huey Tum Ajnabi	Baqir Abbas	Abass Tabish		Inspired by Faiz Ahmad Faiz's poetry "Hum Kay Thehray Ajnabi"
2023	"Tooti Si Dunya"	Allahyar and the 100 Flowers of God	Himself, Hassan Badshah	Himself		

==== Hindi films ====
Year	Song	Film	Music	Lyrics	Co-singer(s)	Notes
2010	"I Love Amreeka"	Tere Bin Laden	Shankar–Ehsaan–Loy	Jaideep Sahni	Akriti Kakar, Anusha Mani Also ft. Shankar Mahadevan's voice in the album	
2010	"Ullu Da Pattha"	Tere Bin Laden	Shankar–Ehsaan–Loy	Jaideep Sahni	Akriti Kakar, Anusha Mani Also ft. Shankar Mahadevan's voice in the album	
2010	"Welcome To Amreeka"	Tere Bin Laden	Shankar–Ehsaan–Loy	Jaideep Sahni		
2010	"Bas Ek Soch"	Tere Bin Laden	Ali Zafar			Single from the album
2011	"F.U.N. Fun Funna"	Luv Ka The End	Ram Sampath	Amitabh Bhattacharya		
2011	"Madhubala"	Mere Brother Ki Dulhan	Sohail Sen	Irshad Kamil	Shweta Pandit	ft. Sreerama Chandra in film version
2011	"Meri Pyaari Piya"	Mere Brother Ki Dulhan	Sohail Sen	Irshad Kamil		Deleted song, but a part of it was ft. in the film
2013	"Early Morning" (Remix Version)	Chashme Baddoor	Sajid–Wajid	Jalees Sherwani	Rap by Limitless	Single; Sonu Nigam's voice ft. in the film
2013	"Dhichkyaaon Doom Doom"	Chashme Baddoor	Sajid–Wajid	Jalees Sherwani	Shreya Ghoshal	Wajid's version was also added in the album. (Note: Film version)
2013	"Andha Ghoda Race Mein Dauda"	Chashme Baddoor	Sajid–Wajid	Neelesh Misra	Wajid	(Note: Zafar was not the lead singer.)
2014	"Nakhriley"	Kill Dil	Shankar–Ehsaan–Loy	Gulzar	Shankar Mahadevan, Mahalakshmi Iyer, Narration by Gulzar	
2015	"DJ"	Hey Bro	Nitz 'N' Sony	Pranav Vatsa	Sunidhi Chauhan	
2016	"Six Pack Abs"	Tere Bin Laden: Dead or Alive	Ali Zafar			
2016	"Tu Hi Hai"	Dear Zindagi	Amit Trivedi	Kausar Munir	Arijit Singh's songs were added in the album.	
2016	"Taarefon Se"	Dear Zindagi	Amit Trivedi	Kausar Munir	Arijit Singh's songs were added in the album.	

==== Other films ====
- 2010: "Dekha" (from Masty) in Wall Street: Money Never Sleeps
- 2024: "Dil Jhoom" in Crakk was recreated from Jhoom

=== TV series ===
Year	Song	Title	Lyrics	Music	Co-singer(s)	Notes
2011	"Dastan-e-Ishq"	Mein Mer Gai Shaukat Ali (A-Plus TV)	(Note: Also added in Jhoom)			
2012	"Zindagi Gulzar Hai"	Zindagi Gulzar Hai	Ali Zafar			
2013	"Channo"	Burka Avenger	Ali Zafar			
2013	"Awaaz Mein Teri"	Pakistan Idol	Ali Zafar			
2019	"Dil ka Dil se hua hai Ehd-e-Wafa"	Ehd-e-Wafa	Imran Raza	Sahir Ali Bagga	Bagga ft. Zafar, Asim Azhar and Aima Baig	
2020	"Mushk"	Mushk	Aehsun Talish	Naveed Nashad		
2021	"Pehli Si Muhabbat"	Pehli Si Muhabbat	Asad Shah	Goher Mumtaz		Awarded as Singer of the Year for unplugged version
2021	"Pareshan Kyun Lage Tu"	Chupke Chupke	Zafar, Naveed Nashad		Nirmal Roy	
2022	"Hum Tum"	Hum Tum	Qamar Nashad	Naveed Nashad	Damia Farooq	
2022	"Mere Dildar Sanam"	Fraud	Zafar		Hina Nasarullah	
2025	"My Dear Cinderella"	My Dear Cinderella	Bagga		Afshan Fawad	
2025	"Dil Tera Ho Gaya"	Shirin Farhad	Qasim Dahir, Hassan Rai		Amna Rai	
2025	"Mere Dushmano"	Humraaz	Qamar Nashad	Naveed Nashad		
2026	"Fanaa"	Mirza Ki Heer	Zafar		Izzat Fatima	
2026	"Chhaleya"	Winter Love	Qamar Nashad	Naveed Nashad		
2026	"Jab Tu Yaad Aaye"	Aap Ki Izzat	Hassan Badshah			

== Singles ==
=== Patriotic songs ===
List of songs about Pakistan
Year	Song	Lyrics	Music	Co-singer(s)	Notes
2007	"Yeh Hum Naheen"	Ali Moeen	Shuja Haider	various	
2015	"Urain Ge"	Ali Zafar			Tribute to the victims of 2014 Peshawar school massacre, and to support 141 Schools for Peace campaign
2015	"Hanstay Hanstay"				(Note: Defence Day special)
2016	"Yaarian"		Sahir Ali Bagga	Atif Aslam	
2016	"Hum Roshan to Kal Roshan"			ft. Sanam Marvi	by Medical Department of Sindh
2017	"Watan Ki Jeet"				
2017	"Qaumi Taranah"	Hafeez Jalandhari	Ahmed Ghulam Ali Chagla ft. Zafar		
2019	"Jaan De Deinge"	Ali Zafar			(Note: Pakistan Day special)
2020	"Ye Watan Tumhara Hai"	Kaleem Usmani	Tribute to the medical and security staff for fighting against COVID-19 and protecting lives; rendition of Mehdi Hassan's patriotic song Co-singer Iqrar Ul Hassan in 2021 (Note: Independence Day special)		
2020	"Pakistani na Haarein ge"	Imran Raza	Bagga ft. Zafar, Shafqat Amanat Ali, Hadiqa Kiani, Asim Azhar, Nabeel Shaukat Ali		Awareness for COVID-19 pandemic in Pakistan
2020	"Kaam Kaam Kaam"	re-written, composed and sung by Zafar; Muhammad Ali Jinnah's message (co-released by Diamond Supreme Foam)			
2021	"Aik Qaum, Aik Manzil"	Abid Hassan	Zafar along with producer Sarmad Ghafoor	Aima Baig	
2021	"Hum Mazdoor"	Rehman Faris	Hassan Badshah		Tribute to the labourers of Pakistan on Labour Day
2021	"You Have Stolen My Heart"	Liang Peng	Tiang Yi, Ling Shengxian	Miang Xinqi	Debut in Chinese language, released on 70th anniversary of China–Pakistan relations
2021	"Aye Watan Pyare Watan"		Akhtar Hussain		Tribute to Amanat Ali Khan
2021	"Mein Ura"	Ali Zafar			Tribute to Pakistan Air Force
2022	"Hum Mustafavi Hain"	Jamiluddin Aali	Music recreated by Zafar and Baqir Abbas for 2022 Islamic Summit Conference, anthem released by Ministry of Foreign Affairs and Ministry of Information & Broadcasting; originally composed by Sohail Rana and sung by Mehdi Zaheer for 2nd Organisation of Islamic Cooperation Summit		

=== Coke Studio ===
Coke Studio Pakistan
Year	Season	Song	Co-singer(s)	Notes
2008	1	"Rangeen"		
2008	1	"Janay Na Koi"		(Note: Reprise from Masty)
2008	1	"Channo"		
2008	1	"Chal Dil Meray"		
2008	1	"Allah Hu"	Saaein Tufail Ahmed	
2009	2	"Dastaan-e-Ishq"		rehearsal version; later, completed in album
2009	2	"Yar Daddi"		originally sung by Muhammad Juman
2009	2	"Nahi Ray Nahi"		
2015	8	"Sohni Dharti"	Season's ft. artists	
2015	8	"Rockstar"		Song of the Year winner
2015	8	"Ae Dil"	Sara Haider	cover from 1963 film Ek Tera Sahara (Note: originally composed by Inayat Hussain and sung by Saleem Raza)
2015	8	"Ajj Din Vehre Vich"		written by Shahnawaz Zaidi; composed by Asrar Hussain Chishti
2017	10	"Qaumi Taranah"	Season's ft. artists	
2017	10	"Jaan-e-Bahaaraan"		
2017	10	"Julie"	ft. Danyal Zafar; guitar	
2017	10	"Yo Soch"	Natasha Khan	
2017	10	"Us Rah Par"	Ali Hamza ft. Strings	originally written by Shoaib Mansoor; sung by Junaid Jamshed and released for his 1999 album Us Rah Par

=== Lux Style Awards ===
Lux Style Awards
Year	Ceremony	Song	Notes
2006	5th	"Kharayaan Day Naal"	
2007	6th	"Sajania"	
2012	11th	Medley	
2012	11th	"Mujhe Tum Nazar Sai"	tribute to Mehdi Hassan
2015	14th	"Rockstar"	studio version
2016	15th	"Dil Se Bara"	LSA anniversary special
2016	15th	"Mere Maula"	tribute to Amjad Sabri; co-singers Ali Sethi and Quratulain Balouch
2017	16th	"Ishq"	
2022	21st	Cultural Medley	ft. Urooj Fatima, Abid Brohi, Gul Panra, and Fortitude Pukhtoon Core

=== Sports ===
Sport in Pakistan
Year	Song	Notes
2011	"Rise For Jazba" (Jazz Pakistan)	Pakistan cricket team's songs for 2011 Cricket World Cup
2011	"Duniya Hai Dil Walon Ki" (Pepsi Pakistan)	Pakistan cricket team's songs for 2011 Cricket World Cup
2015	"Ab Khel Ke Dikha"	2016 Pakistan Super League's official anthem
2016	"Chakka Choka"	Islamabad United official theme song
2016	"Life is Chest of Test"	Theme song for International PACES Competition; co-singers Damia Farooq and her sister Parisa Farooq
2017	"Ab Khel Jamay Ga"	2017 Pakistan Super League's official anthem
2018	"Dil Se Jaan Laga De"	2018 Pakistan Super League's official anthem
2020	"Mela Loot Liya"	Cricket anthem for Pakistan ft. fans
2021	"Game Bun Gayi"	Sponsored by Garena Free Fire; ft. Rap by Alistair Alvin
2022	"Dabangg"	For team DHA Dabanggs, Karachi Tape Ball Premier League
2023	"Maza Aya"	Ft. Hashim Nawaz
2023	"Bahadur"	Ft. Abid Brohi; for team Hyderabad Bahadurs, Sindh Premier League
2024	"Khul Ke Khel"	2024 Pakistan Super League's official anthem with Aima Baig
2025	"X Dekho"	2025 Pakistan Super League's official anthem with Abrar Ul Haq, Talha Anjum, and Natasha Baig

=== Poetries ===
Year	Title	Notes
2007	"Those For Truth"	Composed by Fuzz
2008	"Where do we go from Here?"	Recited in Dawn News show TalkBack with Wajahat Saeed Khan
2017	"Aks"	Recited in Dunya News show Mahaaz with Wajahat Saeed Khan
2017	"Kuch to Ghalat ho Raha Hai"	
2018	"Aurat"	Recited in Miss Veet 2017 Grand Finale
2018	"Khayaal"	
2019	"Haqeeqatein"	
2019	"Hamd-o-Naat"	Dua composed by Hassan Badshah; video directed by Adnan Tariq
2019	"Imagine"	Re-written by Zafar to reflect the context of social media; originally by John Lennon
2019	"Happy New Year"	
2020	"Ko Ko Corona"	Rendition of Ahmed Rushdi's "Ko Ko Korina"; re-written by Zafar in view of COVID-19 pandemic
2020	"Sukoon"	
2020	"Tum Ghalat, Mein Sahi"	
2020	"What happened while I was gone"	Twitter voice note
2023	"Ho Tum"	Women's day
2023	"Faslon Ko Takalluf"	Naat written by Iqbal Azeem and originally performed by Waheed Zafar Qasmi
2025	"Wey Bandiya"	
2025	"Qaseeda Burda Shareef"	Additional lyrics by Zafar
2025	"Aurat Wo Hai"	In wake of a tragedy; killing of Sana Yousaf, a teenage social media influencer
2025	"Noor-e-Khuda"	Naat
2025	"Sohna Nabi"	Naat

=== Covers and tributes ===
Year	Song	Notes
2008	"Neele Neele Ambar Par"	Cover from soundtrack Kalaakaar
2010	"Ain't No Sunshine"	Cover of Bill Withers's original
2011	"Are You Lonesome Tonight?"	Tribute to Elvis Presley
2011	"Dil Aaj Shayar"	Cover from soundtrack Gambler; tribute to Dev Anand
2014	Medleys	Tribute to Raj Kapoor, in 1st Star Box Office Awards with Ayushmann Khurrana
2014	Medleys	Tribute to Amitabh Bachchan, in grand finale of Kaun Banega Crorepati
2015	"Aitebar"	Tribute to Junaid Jamshed by covering his original for album Aitebar by Vital Signs
2016	"Angel"	Rendition of Taher Shah's song
2016	"Jaane Woh Kaise Log The"	Cover from soundtrack Pyaasa
2018	"Jab Tere Sheher Se"	Cover from soundtrack Waadah
2019	"Laila o Laila"	Ft. debutant Urooj Fatima; original folk song for Culture of Balochistan by Faiz Mohammad Baloch
2019	"Lab Pe Aati Hai Dua"	Tribute to Allama Iqbal on his birthday
2019	"Kuch To Log Kahein Ge"	Cover from soundtrack Amar Prem
2020	"Bekas Pe Karam Kijiye"	Cover from soundtrack Mughal-e-Azam
2020	"Allay"	For Culture of Sindh ft. Urooj Fatima and Abid Brohi
2021	"Paharon Ki Qasam"	Tribute to Ali Sadpara; originally sung by Kamal Masood
2021	"Balaghal Ula Bi Kamaalihi"	Naat about Muhammad's Isra' and Mi'raj; arrangement by Baqir Abbas, video directed by Adnan Tariq; Qawwali in memory of Ghulam Farid Sabri, Maqbool Ahmed Sabri and Amjad Sabri
2021	"Larsha Pekhawar"	For Pashtun culture ft. Gul Panra and Fortitude Pukhtoon Core
2023	"O Mere Dil Ke Chain"	Cover from soundtrack Mere Jeevan Saathi
2024	"Balo Batiyan"	Collaborated with Attaullah Khan Esakhelvi to recreate his Saraiki culture folk song
2025	"Karay Karay"	Collaborated with Salman Parasto recreate his Shina language song for culture of Gilgit-Baltistan
2025	"Saiyaara"	

=== Others ===
Year	Song	Notes
2007	"Aaja Sajna"	Hunterz ft. Zafar and Hadiqa Kiani
2012	"Tere Lai"	
2014	"Chal Buleya"	At Pakistan Idol S1E35; reprise from Total Siyapaa
2014	"Dhichkyaaon Doom Doom"	Box office reprise, in 1st Star Box Office Awards
2016	"Mein Aur Tum"	ft. in Junoon's Door
2017	"Julie"	Live & Raw; by Patari.pk
2018	"Teefa-Julie-Rockstar"	Medley at 2018 PSL opening ceremony
2019	"Sajna Door"	Live acoustic (solo); from soundtrack Teefa in Trouble
2021	"Ve Mahiya"	ft. Aima Baig; written by Hassan Badshah, music video by Adnan Qazi
2021	"Bhaee Hazir Hai" †	Rap anthem
2021	"Khushboo"	
2022	"Maula"	
2023	"Husn"	
2023	"Sushi // Woofer Paar De"	With Danny Zee ft. Mykko Montana
2023	"Main Nahi Hoon"	
2023	"BCP Mustang"	For Beaconhouse College Programme
2024	"Yaar Di Akh"	Written by Hassan Badshah; video Zafar at Sydney's beach and Aneesa Sheikh at Los Angeles' beach
2024	"Fade"	Zafar's wife made her first appearance
2024	"Munda on the Rise"	with Danny Zee ft. T.I.

=== TV commercials ===
Year	Song	Notes
2005–2007	"Telenor Tawkshawk"	Several songs for Telenor
2009	"Tarang Hi Tarang Hai"	Tarang Tea whitener; ft. Reema Khan
2011	"Jazz Ke Saath"	Sang in 7 genres for Jazz
2012	"Facebook Pe Chalta Hai"	Mobilink Facebook; ft. Feroze Khan
2012	"Youn Chalay Ke Ballay Ballay"	Mobilink Internet; ft. Nargis Fakhri
2013	"Har Dil, Har Din"	Mobilink tune and narration
2013	"Dil Maange Duniya Abhi"	Pepsi Pakistan song; co-singer Ali Azmat
2014	"Youn Uray Ke Ballay Ballay"	Mobilink 3G Internet; ft. Nargis Fakhri
2014	"Lipta Dance"	Lipton song
2015	"Barhna Hai Agay"	JS Bank song
2016	"Sprite Se Bharkao"	Sprite; ft. Sidharth Malhotra
2017	"Sip Positive"	Nestlé Fruta Vitals; ft. Hania Aamir
2018	"Mario's Pasta"	Mario's Pasta
2018	"Life Needs Flavor"	Lay's Pakistan
2018	"Choti Choti Khushiyaan"	Royal Fans; ft. Maya Ali
2018	"Good Goodies"	Good Goodies cupcake
2021	"Jeeto Dilon Ko"	Cookania
2022	"Let's Get Digital"	Zong
2022	"20 Years of Celebration"	Bisconni Cocomo
2024	"Chaltay Jana Hai"	Innovative Digestive Biscuits

== See also ==
- Rahat Fateh Ali Khan discography
- Atif Aslam discography
- Sahir Ali Bagga discography
- Aima Baig discography
- List of awards and nominations received by Ali Zafar

== Extra notes ==
Key
†	Denotes song or film that has not been released yet
