= Jhoom (album) =

2011 studio album by Ali Zafar

Jhoom (3rd Studio Music Album)

Studio album by Ali Zafar
- Released: 14 February 2011
- Recorded: 2008–2011
- Genre: Pop Sufi
- Length: 1:05:18
- Labels: YRF Music, Alif, Coke Studio, Lightingale

Ali Zafar chronology
Masty (2006)	Jhoom (3rd Studio Music Album) (2011)	London, Paris, New York (2012)
External audio
- Jukebox playlist on YouTube

Jhoom (Urdu: جھوم) is the third album of Pakistani pop singer Ali Zafar, released in 2011 by YRF Music in India, Pakistan and worldwide. It contains Sufi-pop music, remastered in Abbey Road Studios. The album topped the music charts in Pakistan, as well as in India for several weeks after its release.

== Track listing ==
No.	Title	Lyrics	Music	Length
1.	"Jhoom"	Ali Zafar	Ali Zafar	6:24
2.	"Tu Jaaney Na"	Yousuf Salahuddin	Yousuf Salahuddin	4:13
3.	"Jab Sey Dekha Tujko"	Ali Zafar	Ali Zafar	2:36
4.	"Jee Dhoondta Hai"	Ghalib	Ali Zafar	6:15
5.	"Koi Umeed"	Ghalib	Yousuf Salahuddin	4:28
6.	"Jaan-e-Man"	Fazal Ahmed Karim Fazli	Nisar Bazmi	3:59
7.	"Nahin Ray Nahin"	Ali Zafar	Ali Zafar	5:06
8.	"Yar Dhadhi Ishq"			6:48
9.	"Dastan-e-Ishq"	Bulleh Shah, Shah Hussain, Ali Zafar	Ali Zafar, Baqir Abbas	7:04
10.	"Allah Hu"			7:41
11.	"Jhoom" (R&B Mix)	Ali Zafar		4:55
12.	"Dastan-e-Ishq" (Dhol Version)	Bulleh Shah, Shah Hussain, Ali Zafar	Ali Zafar, Baqir Abbas	7:03
Total length:				1:06:38

== Personnels ==
- arrangement by Ali Zafar
  - guitar by Ali Zafar
    - "Jhoom"
      - bass by Imran Danish
      - tabla by Jafri
    - "Tu Jaaney Na"
      - bass, keys, flute and co-arranged by Baqir Abbas
  - all instrument programming by Ali Zafar
    - "Jab Sey Dekha Tujko"
    - Ghazals by Ghalib
      - "Jee Dhoondta Hai"
        - additional rhythm guitar by Danyal Zafar
      - "Koi Umeed"
    - "Jaan-e-Man"
      - originally sung by Mehdi Hassan
  - "Nahin Ray Nahin"
    - keys by Ali Zafar
    - flute by Baqir Abbas
    - mixed by Rohail Hyatt
- "Yar Dhadhi Ishq"
  - originally performed at Coke Studio; vocal re-dubbing at Alif Studios
  - originally sung by Muhammad Juman
- performed at Coke Studio; produced by Rohail Hyatt
  - "Nahin Ray Nahin"
  - "Allah Hu"
    - Folk Fusion; co-singer Saaein Tufail Ahmed
- "Jhoom" (R&B Mix)
  - produced by Abhijit Vaghani
  - mixed by Aftab Khan
- "Dastan-e-Ishq"
  - Antras taken as verses from poetries by Bulleh Shah and Shah Hussain; Astai written by Ali Zafar
  - programmed as studio version and dhol version by Ali Zafar
  - flute by Baqir Abbas
  - guitar by Tahir
  - bass by Imran Danish

== Awards and nominations ==
- 2012 Lux Style Award for "Best Album"
- 2011 Mirchi Music Awards for Indie Pop Song of the Year – Nominated

== Featured in other media ==
Earlier from the release of album, Ali Zafar joined Coke Studio Pakistan, and performed "Allah Hu" along with Saaein Tufail Ahmed in season 1, 2008, and "Dastan-e-Ishq"; "Yar Daddi" and "Nahi Ray Nahi" in season 2, 2009; one of which was also featured as OST for a 2011 TV series on A-Plus TV.

In May 2022, "Jhoom" (R&B Mix) went viral on social media, with several Indian celebrities making Instagram reels and cover versions, after which Zafar released a compilation music video on 29 May 2022. The song was recreated for 2024 Hindi film Crakk by composer Tanishk Bagchi and lyricist Gurpreet Saini.

=== Music videos ===
1. "Allah Hu" (Coke Studio)
2. "Dastan-e-Ishq" (Coke Studio)
3. "Yar Dhadhi Ishq" (Coke Studio)
4. "Nahin Ray Nahin" (Coke Studio)
5. "Jhoom"
6. "Jee Dhoondta Hai"
7. "Dastan-e-Ishq" (Main Mar Gai Shaukat Ali)
8. "Jhoom" (R&B Mix)

== See also ==
- Ali Zafar discography
  - Huqa Pani
  - Total Siyapaa
  - Teefa in Trouble
