= Total Siyapaa =

2014 Indian romantic comedy film

- Theatrical release poster
- Directed by: Eeshwar Nivas
- Written by: Neeraj Pandey
- Produced by: Neeraj Pandey; Shital Bhatia
- Starring: Ali Zafar; Yami Gautam; Anupam Kher; Kirron Kher; Sara Khan
- Cinematography: Vishnu Rao
- Music by: Songs: Ali Zafar; Score: Sanjoy Chowdhury
- Production companies: AKA Picture Company; Friday Filmworks
- Distributed by: Reliance Entertainment
- Release date: 7 March 2014
- Running time: 108 minutes
- Country: India
- Language: Hindi
- Budget: ₹100 million
- Box office: est. ₹131 million

Total Siyapaa (Note: Originally titled Aman Ki Asha after an Indo-Pakistani peace campaign of the same name. Later changed due to copyright issues with the campaign.) (Total Chaos) is a 2014 Indian Hindi-language romantic comedy film directed by Eeshwar Nivas and written by Neeraj Pandey. The screenplay is based on that of the Spanish-Argentine film Only Human, written and directed by Dominic Harari and Teresa Pelegri. The main characters in the original film are Israeli and Palestinian, whilst in Total Siyapaa, they are Indian and Pakistani.

It was distributed by Reliance Big Entertainment across 850 theatres in India with two other films: Gulaab Gang and Queen. The film opened on a similar note with Queen in multiplexes, offering stiff competition to each other owing to a similar release count.

The film stars Ali Zafar and Yami Gautam in lead roles, with Anupam Kher and Kirron Kher in supporting roles, who appeared for the first time as an on-screen couple. The first look of the film along with that of Holiday: A Soldier Is Never Off Duty was launched on the Zee Cine Awards.

Gada-owned Pen India acquired the film rights from Reliance Entertainment while & Pictures acquired 50 per cent equity of the satellite rights. Reliance and Zee Network own the film's overseas and promotional rights respectively. Consequently, Reliance and Gada decided to postpone the release date to 7 March 2014 from 30 January 2014 to promote it. Upon release, Total Siyapaa received generally negative reviews from critics and did not perform well financially.

== Plot ==
Settled in London, Aman Ali, a Pakistani musician, hopes to marry Asha Singh, an Indian woman living in London with her family. He visits her parents' house to seek their permission to marry her. However, his plans to impress the Punjabi family start failing when they discover that he is Pakistani. During the course of events, "total chaos" happens.

== Cast ==
- Ali Zafar as Aman Ali
- Yami Gautam as Asha Singh
- Anupam Kher as Rajinder Singh, Asha's father
- Kirron Kher as Asha's mother
- Sara Khan as Jiah Singh, Asha's sister
- Arshpreet Kaur as Anjali Singh, Jiah's daughter
- Vishwa Mohan Badola as Daddu, Asha's grandfather
- Anuj Pandit Sharma as Manav Singh, Asha's brother
- Barrie Martin
- Sandeep Londhe as friend of Manav Singh

== Critical reception ==
Reviews of the performances were mixed, with the Hindustan Times lauding it; the Deccan Chronicle and Bollywood Life criticized Ali Zafar's and Yami Gautam's performances, respectively. Kirron Kher's performance was seen as one of the strong points. The lack of a solid plot, the lack of attention to detail and poor comic timing were seen as major drawbacks. The film was largely seen as unfunny and not living up to the trailer.

== Box office reception ==
Total Siyapaa received a low opening with poor box office reception in India due to negative reviews from critics. However, the film did better overseas, being positively received in Pakistan and the United Arab Emirates.

== Soundtrack ==
Total Siyapaa

Soundtrack album by Ali Zafar
- Released: 14 February 2014
- Recorded: 2013
- Genre: Filmi Soundtrack
- Length: 17:17
- Label: T-Series

Ali Zafar chronology
London, Paris, New York (2012)	Total Siyapaa (2014)	Teefa in Trouble (2018)

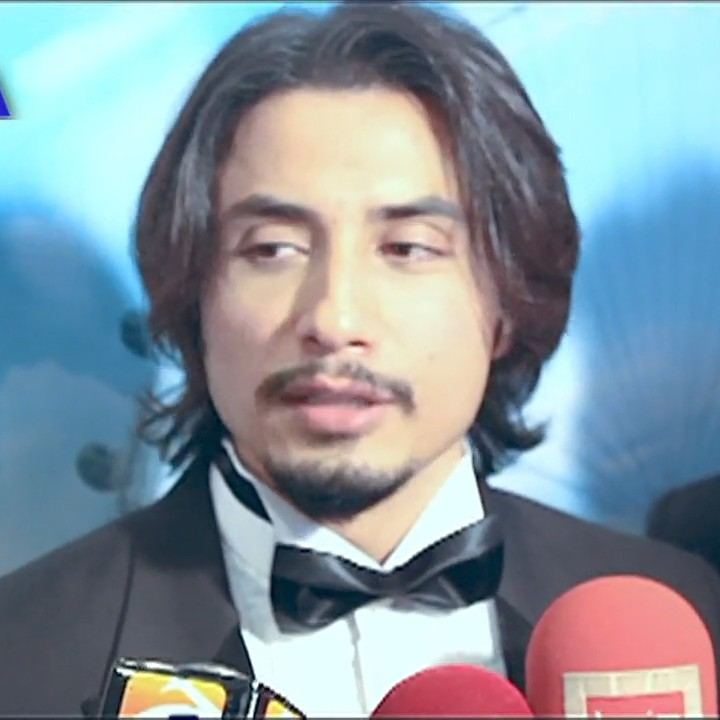
Zafar at the film premiere in Karachi

The album is sung and composed by Ali Zafar; the main lead of the movie. Music was released on 14 February 2014 and was well received by Critics. Karthik writes "The title song Total Siyapaa along with the quirky lyrics, dialogues and sounds, is good fun. Ali Zafar fares really well in Palat Meri jaan, singing, writing and composing the lovely ballad. Palat Meri Jaan is a Chart buster. Nahi maloom has a captivating Middle-Eastern + Latino blend sound and is sung particularly well by Ali and Fariha Parvaiz. The composer-singer uses a reggae template in Asha and delivers a nice, winsome song. Chal Buleya is sufi song with a message. Barring that minor misstep, charming soundtrack overall, with Ali offering a good demonstration of his multi-facetedness."

All music is composed by Ali Zafar.

Total Siyapaa
No.	Title	Lyrics	Singer(s)	Length
1.	"Total Siyapaa"	Kumaar	Ali Zafar	3:05
2.	"Palat Meri Jaan"	Ali Zafar	Ali Zafar	3:44
3.	"Nahin Maloom"	Aqeel Rubi	Ali Zafar, Fariha Pervez	3:41
4.	"Asha"	Ali Zafar	Ali Zafar	3:24
5.	"Chal Buleya"	Bulleh Shah	Ali Zafar	3:23
Total length:				17:17

== See also ==
- Bollywood films of 2014
- Ali Zafar discography
  - Huqa Pani
  - Masty
  - Jhoom
