= Masty (album) =

2006 studio album by Ali Zafar

Masty (2nd Studio Music Album)

Studio album by Ali Zafar
- Released: 1 December 2006
- Genre: Pop Rock
- Length: 38:15
- Labels: Frankfinn Entertainment, Fire, Oriental Star Agencies

Ali Zafar chronology
Huqa Pani (2003)	Masty (2nd Studio Music Album) (2006)	Jhoom (2011)
External audio
- Jukebox playlist on YouTube

Masty (Urdu: مستی) is the second studio album by Pakistani pop rock singer Ali Zafar. From this album, the music video of the single "Dekha" was named the most expensive music video of Pakistan at that time, costing more than Rs. 10 million. The video was produced by Lux and was shot in Malaysia, featuring Reema Khan, Meera, and Aaminah Haq.

== Track listing ==
No.	Title	Lyrics	Music	Length
1.	"Masty"	Ali Zafar	Ali Zafar	4:27
2.	"Dekha"			4:19
3.	"Sajania"	Ali Zafar	Ali Zafar	4:13
4.	"Jaanay Na Koi"			5:28
5.	"Aasman"			2:36
6.	"Meray Hathon"			3:31
7.	"Meray Hathon" (Flute version)			3:31
8.	"Kharayaan Day Naal"			5:39
9.	"Aag"			4:37
Total length:				38:15

Other tracks
No.	Title	Length
10.	"Aasman" (Unplugged with Vocals)	2:42
11.	"Masti" (Remix)	4:25
12.	"Sajania" (Remix)	3:48

== Personnels ==
- Programmed and arranged by Shanny, co-arranged by Ali Zafar (1, 3)

== Accolades ==
- Best Male Artist for Masty in MTV Style Awards, 2008

== Featured in other media ==
Ali Zafar performed "Kharayaan Day Naal" in 5th Lux Style Awards, "Sajania" in 6th Lux Style Awards and "Janay Na Koi" in Coke Studio's season 1. His song "Dekha" was featured in 2010 Hollywood film Wall Street: Money Never Sleeps.

=== Music videos ===
1. "Sajania"
2. "Dekha"
3. "Masty"
4. "Aag"
5. "Aasman"
6. "Kharayaan Day Naal" (LSA 2006)
7. "Sajania" (LSA 2007)
8. "Janay Na Koi" (Coke Studio)
9. "Aasman" (PSL Reprise)

== See also ==
- Ali Zafar discography
  - London, Paris, New York
  - Total Siyapaa
  - Teefa in Trouble
