= Ali Zafar =

Pakistani singer-songwriter and actor (born 1980)

Ali Zafar PP
- علی ظفر
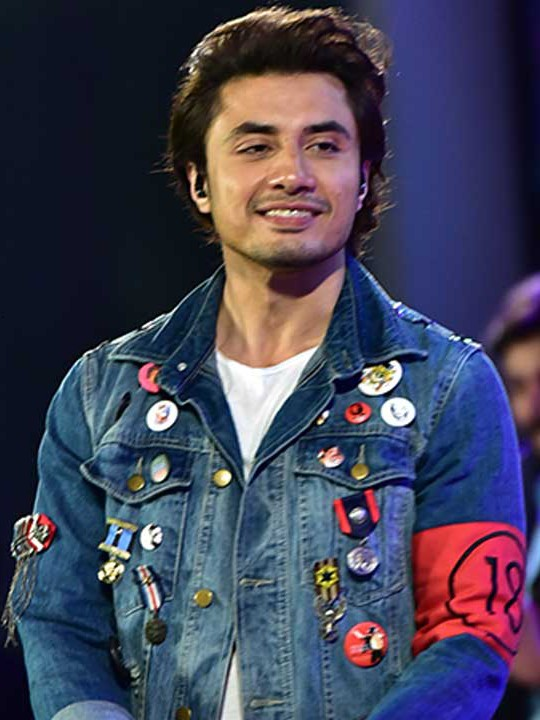
- Zafar in 2018
- Pronunciation: [əliː zəfəɾ]
- Born: 18 May 1980 (age 46); Lahore, Punjab, Pakistan
- Education: National College of Arts; Govt. College University
- Occupations: Singer; songwriter; actor
- Years active: 2000–present
- Works: Discography; filmography
- Mother: Kanwal Ameen
- Awards: Full list
- Honours: Pride of Performance (2021)
- Musical career
- Also known as: AZ
- Genres: Pop; rock; electronic; folk; classical; sufi; filmi
- Instruments: Vocals; guitar; keyboard
- Years active: 2003–present
- Labels: Lightingale; Coke Studio; Pan Rhythm; Empire Music; Universal Music; Fire Records; Frankfinn Entertainment; YRF Music; Sony Music; T-Series
- Formerly of: Prozac
- Ali Zafar's voice Recorded on 15 December 2015
- Website: alizafar.net

Ali Zafar (Note: Punjabi pronunciation: [əliː zəfəɾ].) PP (Urdu: علی ظفر; pronounced [əliː zəfəɾ]; born 18 May 1980) is a Pakistani singer-songwriter, actor, model, producer, screenwriter and painter. He started out on Pakistani television as an actor before becoming a popular musician, later also established a career in Bollywood and his success led many Pakistani actors to venture into Hindi films. He has received five Lux Style Awards and a Filmfare Award nomination.

The son of educationist Kanwal Ameen, Zafar began his music career as a composer and gained popularity with his single "Channo" from his debut album, Huqa Pani (2003), which sold over five million copies worldwide. "Channo" turned out to be a huge success, topping many music charts and earned him several awards for Best Music Album and Artist. Zafar made his acting debut in cinema with a leading role in the 2010 Bollywood satire film Tere Bin Laden, a moderate box office success. His performance in the film garnered critical appreciation and earned him several nominations in the Best Male Debut category, including Filmfare. He then also worked in several films, including Mere Brother Ki Dulhan, Chashme Baddoor, and Dear Zindagi.

Alongside his acting and singing career, Zafar participates in tours, concerts, and stage shows, is active in humanitarian work, and has a number of endorsement deals. In 2013, Zafar was voted as the "Sexiest Asian Man on the Planet", based on a worldwide poll by the British newspaper Eastern Eye.

On 23 March 2021, Ali Zafar was awarded the highest literary award, Pride of Performance, for his contribution in the field of arts and music. He received the award from President of Pakistan Arif Alvi at ceremony at the President House, Islamabad.

== Early life and education ==
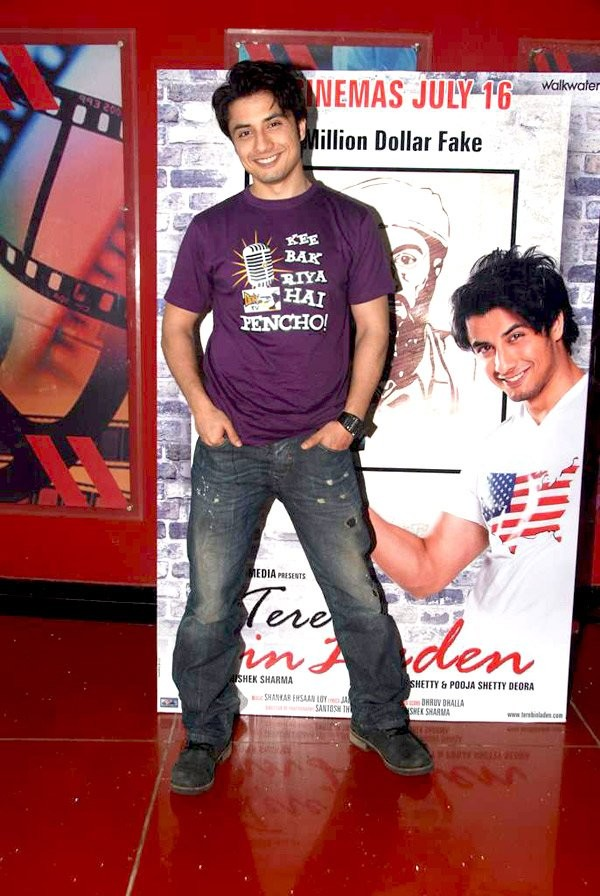
Zafar at the premiere of Tere Bin Laden, 2010

Ali Zafar was born in Lahore, Punjab, Pakistan into a Punjabi family. His parents, Mohammad Zafarullah and Kanwal Ameen, were professors at the University of Punjab; his father was a painter who retired as the chairman of the Fine Arts department of his college while his mother was Pakistan's first scholar in library science. He has two brothers, Zain and Danyal; the latter of these is a commercial model who has also turned actor and musician.

Zafar received his early education from C.A.A. Public School. He graduated from the Government College University, Lahore and the National College of Arts, qualifying in 2002 as a painter with an honour's degree.

== Acting career ==
Zafar started his career as a sketch artist at Pearl Continental Hotel in Lahore and then began acting in television serials. He debuted as a television actor by acting in PTV drama serials Kollege Jeans, Kanch Ke Par (both 2000) and Landa Bazar (2002).

In 2010, he made his debut as an actor with the Bollywood film Tere Bin Laden, which was directed by Abhishek Sharma. Tere Bin Laden was partially based on Osama bin Laden and Zafar played a Pakistani journalist from Karachi, who makes fake video of Osama Bin Laden, so that he could go to America. The film, released in July 2010, proved to be a major commercial success in India, but was banned in Pakistan. Zafar's performance in the film garnered critical appreciation and earned him Best Male Debut nominations at several award ceremonies, including IIFA Awards, Screen Awards, Zee Cine Awards and Filmfare Awards. He was also named as the first Pakistani to be called to Indian Film Festival at Australia in March 2011 for his movie screening.

In March 2012, Zafar starred in the film London, Paris, New York with Aditi Rao Hydari. It was directed by Anu Menon, and Zafar also composed the soundtrack for the film. He also performed the soundtrack for the Pakistani drama Zindagi Gulzar Hai, which won Best Original Soundtrack at the 12th Lux Style Awards in 2013.

Zafar also starred in the romantic comedy film Chashme Baddoor, directed by David Dhawan. The film was released in April 2013 and was declared a box office super-hit. The same year, he was also featured in an episode of Burka Avenger, singing his famous song "Channo". Zafar then also starred in and composed the soundtrack for the film Total Siyappa, which was a romantic comedy film released in March 2014. He also acted in Kill Dil, which was released in November.

Zafar had performed an item number "Six Pack Abs" in the sequel of his 2010 film Tere Bin Laden, entitled Tere Bin Laden: Dead or Alive, which was released in February 2016. Zafar was also seen in Pakistani film Lahore Se Aagey. He then appeared in Gauri Shinde's Dear Zindagi as a musician alongside the star cast Alia Bhatt. The films were released in November 2016. He then also sung "Hum Roshan to Kal Roshan", which released in December 2016.

In 2016, he announced he was producing a Pakistani action film based in the Deosai National Park.

In 2018, Zafar starred in Ahsan Rahim's directorial debut romantic action-comedy film Teefa in Trouble, alongside Maya Ali, which served as the debut for both the actors in Lollywood, and also the debut of Zafar's Lightingale Productions.

In 2026, Zafar was announced as a judge for the first season of Pakistan's Got Talent, the Pakistani version of the international Got Talent franchise, alongside Mehwish Hayat and Tabish Hashmi.

== Music career ==
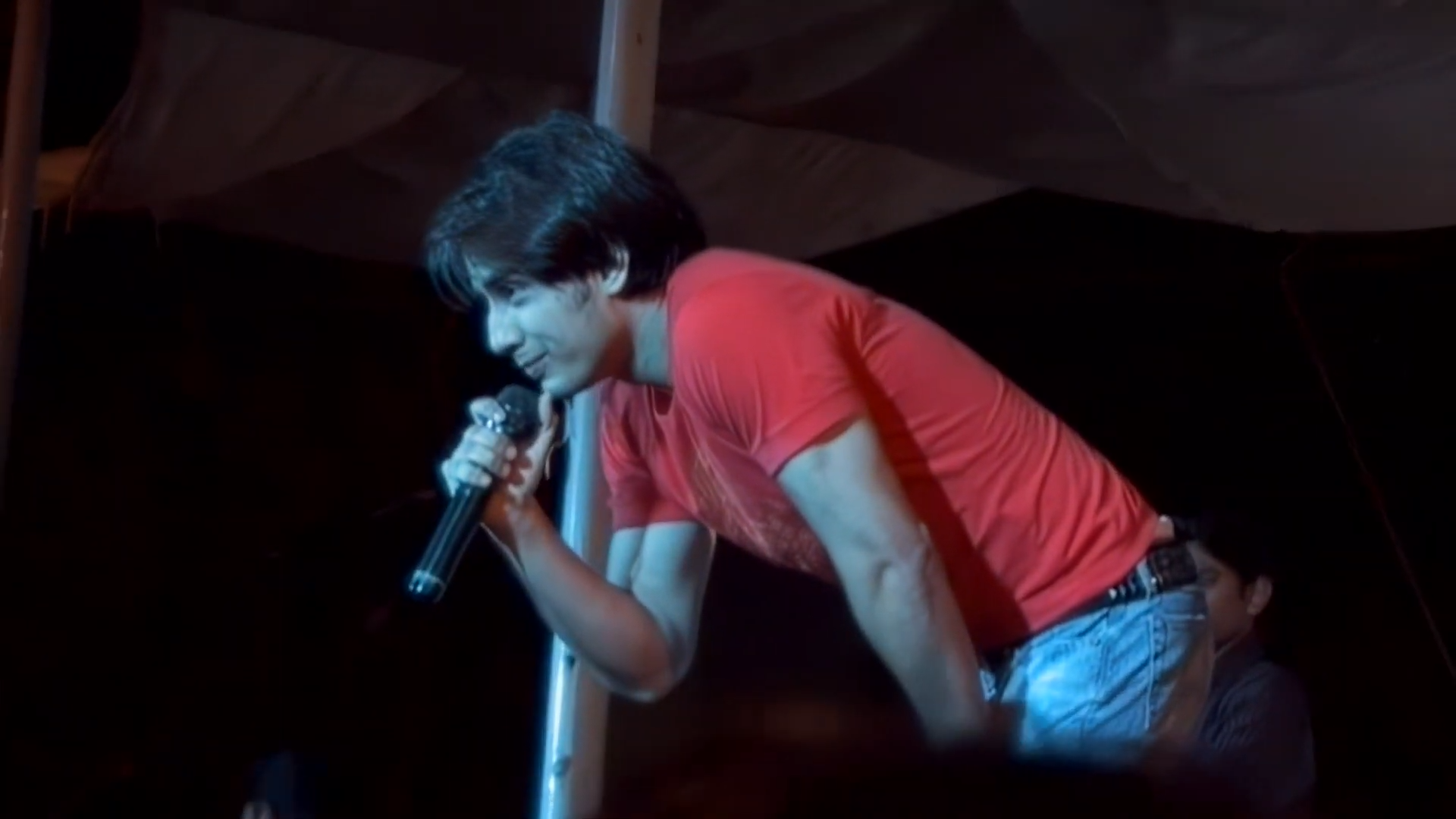
Zafar performing at Indus Valley School in 2004

Zafar sang "Jugnuon Se Bhar De Aanchal" for the 2003 film Shararat. In the same year, he debuted as a musician with the album Huqa Pani, which was a success. The album sold over 5,000,000 copies worldwide and won several awards and nominations, including the 2004 Lux Style Award for "Best Album" and the 2008 "Best Male Artist" award at the MTV awards, making him one of the most popular pop singers in Pakistan. It was also claimed that Bollywood's popular music directors Himesh Reshammiya and Pritam ripped "Channo" and "Rangeen" from Zafar's album in "Chhore Ki Baatein" for Fight Club – Members Only and "Dillagi Mein Jo Beet Jaaye" for Aashiq Banaya Aapne respectively.

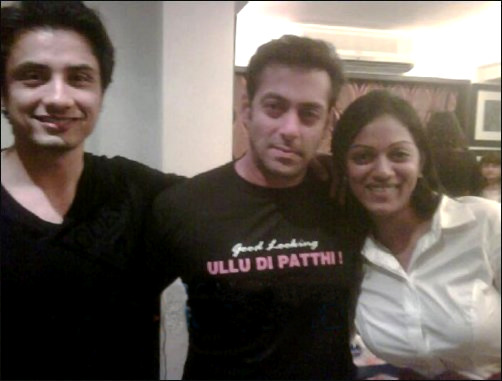
Zafar with Salman Khan at the audio release of the song "Ullu Da Patha" in Dubai, 2010.

Zafar released his second album Masty in November 2006. The music video of the single "Dekha" was named the most expensive music video of Pakistan, costing more than ten million rupees. The video was produced by Lux and was shot in Malaysia, featuring Reema Khan, Meera and Aaminah Haq. The song was also made part of the Hollywood film Wall Street: Money Never Sleeps, which was released in September 2010. He is currently the fourth Pakistani artist after Nusrat Fateh Ali Khan, Strings and Atif Aslam to have songs featured in Hollywood films. He also won the "Youth Icon" award in the Lux Style Awards 2007, in Malaysia. Zafar was also offered a role for the 2007 film Khuda Kay Liye, but was unable to sign due to some personal reasons. The role was then performed by Fawad Khan.

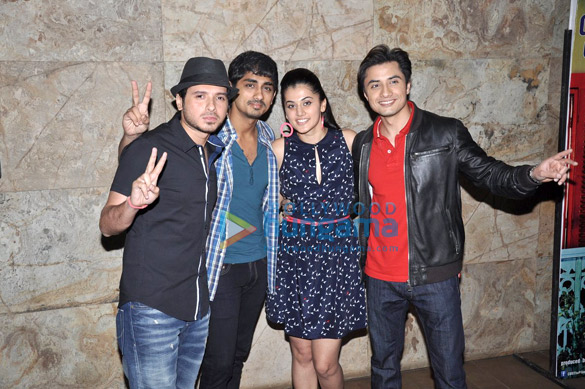
Zafar with Siddharth Narayan, Taapsee Pannu and Divyendu Sharma in Mumbai.

In February 2011, Zafar released his third album Jhoom, which won the 2012 Lux Style Award for "Best Music Album". He made a special appearance in the film Luv Ka The End, in which he sang a song, "F.U.N. Fun Funna". He also sung the title song for the film Love Mein Ghum. He also acted alongside Tara D'Souza in the film Mere Brother Ki Dulhan, starring Imran Khan and Katrina Kaif, and it was released in September 2011.

Zafar released a single "Urain Ge" as tribute to victims of APS Peshawar attack in early 2015, featuring many Pakistani artists. His voice was also featured in the song "DJ", which was sung by Sunidhi Chauhan for the film Hey Bro. He then also sang a song for Defence Day, "Hanstay Hanstay Youn Hi Hum Chalen".

As of 2016, he was working on his fourth music album. Roshni eventually released in 2025.

=== Tours and performances ===
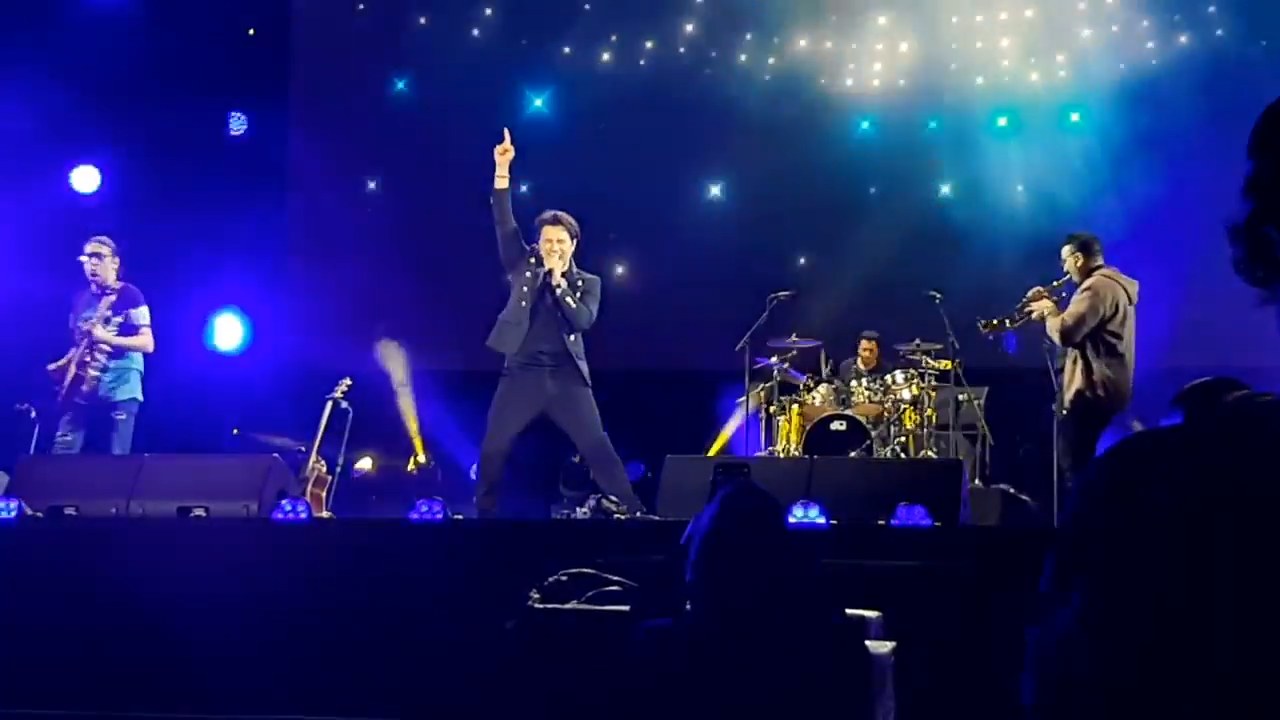
Zafar at Expo 2020

After he got fame, Zafar first performed at the ceremony of 3rd Lux Style Awards in 2004. The following year, he did his stage act at 4th Lux Style Awards. He then sang live the songs in 5th Lux Style Awards in 2006 and 6th Lux Style Awards in 2007, and then performed a stage dance with Reema Khan in the 2007 ceremony. He also had performed in Mela Festival at Oslo, Norway in 2008.

He joined Coke Studio Pakistan in 2008 and performed three original songs "Allah Hu", "Daastan-e-Ishq" and "Nahi Ray Nahi", and one tribute song "Yaar Daddi Ishq" to Muhammad Juman, in season one and two.

In 2012, Zafar performed at 11th Lux Style Awards with Humaima Malick and also paid tribute to musician Mehdi Hassan by singing his ghazal "Mujhe Tum Nazar Sai". He also performed at the Pantaloons Femina Miss India contest held at Bhavans Ground in Mumbai on 30 March 2012. He then performed at GiMA Awards. He also had performed at 57th Filmfare Awards, but his performance was cut out in the TV release. In 2013, he performed along with Shah Rukh Khan, Katrina Kaif and Preity Zinta at Temptations Reloaded concert in Muscat, Oman.

Zafar then also performed in the Lifestyle Pakistan Expo at Karachi Expo Centre, where he walked the ramp for designer brand ChenOne and also performed with a dhol. He was also invited to perform in 2013 Cannes Film Festival held at Cannes, France. In 2014, he was seen performing with Yami Gautam on Zee Cine Awards. He then also performed in Naz Choudhury's Bollywood Showstoppers at The O2 Arena along with Sonakshi Sinha, Jacqueline Fernandez, Mika Singh and Shahid Kapoor. He then also hosted the first Star Box Office India Awards Ceremony along with Ayushmann Khurrana, where they also gave a musical tribute to Raj Kapoor.

He re-joined Coke Studio Pakistan in 2015 for the eight season where he performed three songs. The first song "Rockstar" became popular worldwide, and was also appreciated by Imran Khan, Mahira Khan, Sonu Nigam, Hrithik Roshan and Adnan Sami, and then it was also awarded the title Song of the Year. Zafar then gave tribute to Saleem Raza by performing a second song "Ae Dil" along with Sara Haider. The third song he performed was Sufi "Ajj Din Vehre Vich".

At the logo-launch-event of Pakistan Super League on 20 September 2015, Zafar released and performed on the league anthem "Ab Khel Ke Dikha". He also performed in the launch event of the team Islamabad United on 30 January 2016, where he released team anthem "Chakka Choka". He then also performed in the opening ceremony of 2016 PSL on 4 February. He also performed about 50 concerts across Pakistan within two months in early 2016.

Zafar performed a dancing act on the remix of his Coke Studio hit "Rockstar" in the ceremony of 14th Lux Style Awards, after when he was given musical tribute by Jimmy Khan, Uzair Jaswal, Sara Haider and Farhan Saeed separately, in 2015. The following year, he hosted the ceremony, where he performed an opening dance act on his new song paying tribute to Lux Style Awards. He then also gave a musical tribute there, co-singing with Ali Sethi and Qurat-ul-Ain Balouch, to Amjad Sabri who was assassinated in Karachi on 22 June 2016.

The same year, he collaborated with Atif Aslam for the song "Yaarian", and they performed on it on Defence Day. Zafar walked the ramp in September with Mahira Khan, showcasing the bridal collection in Divani's Bagh-e-Bahar show, at the Haveli Barood Khana. He also performed on the stage of 1st Hum Style Awards along with Sohai Ali Abro, where he was also awarded "Most Stylish Male Performer". In his concert on 25 November, he performed the mannequin challenge too.

Zafar released anthem of 2017 PSL "Ab Khel Jamay Ga" in January 2017, upon which he then also performed in its opening ceremony on 9 February in Dubai, and also at its closing ceremony on 5 March in Gaddafi Stadium, Lahore. He also performed at grand finale of Miss Veet in January. On 19 April, he along with his Teefa in Trouble co-star Maya Ali, performed in the 16th Lux Style Awards.

In tenth season of Coke Studio Pakistan, Zafar performed four songs, after being featured in the promo song "Qaumi Taranah". He performed his original "Julie" alongside his brother Danyal Zafar on guitars under Shani Arshad's production, and "Yo Soch" with Natasha Khan under Strings production. He also gave tribute to Master Inayat Hussain by performing "Jaan-e-Bahaaraan" solo under Shuja Haider's production, and to Junaid Jamshed by "Us Rah Par" with Ali Hamza ft. Strings under Jaffer Zaidi's production.

On 27 October 2017, Zafar performed at the MTV Unplugged India concert with Ayushmann Khurrana at Dubai Tennis Stadium.

In 2024, he performed at Al-Suwaidi Park during Riyadh Season in Saudi Arabia, attracting over 100,000 attendees in what was reported as the event's largest concert.

== Personal life ==
Zafar married his long-time fiancée Ayesha Fazli, who is a distant relative of Indian actor Aamir Khan, on 28 July 2009 in Lahore, Pakistan. They had a boy in 2010, and a girl in 2015.

His brother-in-law Umair Fazli is a movie director, better known for making the 2016 box office success Saya e Khuda e Zuljalal.

For his film career, Zafar has trained in mixed martial arts (MMA) and kickboxing.

== Controveries ==
=== Legal battle with Meesha Shafi ===
On 19 April 2018, fellow actress and singer Meesha Shafi accused Zafar of sexual harassment on Twitter. More women came in Shafi's support and accused Zafar of misconduct. Zafar categorically denied the allegations and filed a legal defamation suit. Reported as a "high-profile" case, it was ruled in Zafar's favour on 31 March 2026, and Shafi was ordered to pay Rs. 50 lakh in damages.

== Filmography ==
Key
†	Denotes films that have not yet been released

=== Films ===
==== Pakistani cinema ====
Pakistani cinema
Year	Title	Role	Notes
2016	Lahore Se Aagey	Himself	Cameo appearance
2018	Teefa in Trouble	Lateef "Teefa"	Also co-writer and producer (Note: also composed soundtrack)
2021	Khel Khel Mein	Himself	Cameo appearance
2023	Allahyar and the 100 Flowers of God	Minister	Voice over

==== Hindi cinema ====
Hindi cinema
Year	Title	Role	Notes
2010	Tere Bin Laden	Ali Hassan	Nominated—Filmfare Best Male Debut Award
2011	Luv Ka The End	Freddy Kapoor	Cameo
2011	Mere Brother Ki Dulhan	Luv Agnihotri	
2012	London, Paris, New York	Nikhil Chopra	
2013	Chashme Baddoor	Siddharth "Sid" Kashyap	
2014	Total Siyapaa	Aman Ali	
2014	Kill Dil	Tutu	
2016	Tere Bin Laden: Dead or Alive	Himself	Special appearance in song "Six Pack Abs"
2016	Dear Zindagi	Rumi	

=== Television ===
==== Drama series ====
Year	Title	Role	Network
2000	Kollege Jeans	Himself	PTV Home
2000	Kanch Ke Par	Temur	PTV Home
2002	Landa Bazar	Ramis	PTV Home
2004	Jugnoo Aur Anchal	Jamal	PTV Home

==== Award shows ====
Year	Ceremony	Role	Network
2014	1st Star Box Office India Awards	Host	Star Plus
2016	15th Lux Style Awards	Host	Geo TV
2021	5th Hum Style Awards	Host	Hum TV

==== Reality television ====
Year	Title	Role	Network
2026	Pakistan's Got Talent	Judge	Geo Entertainment

=== Other appearances ===
- Music video of "Preeto", by Abrar ul Haq

== See also ==
- List of Bollywood films
- List of Indian playback singers
- Music of Pakistan
- History of Pakistani pop music
- List of Pakistani actors
