= Rahat Fateh Ali Khan discography =

List of works by the Pakistani singer

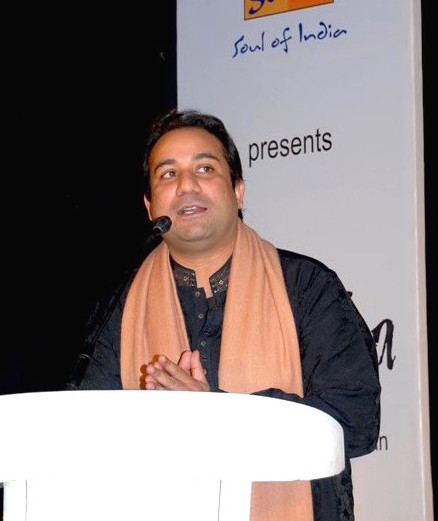
- Rahat Fateh Ali Khan at Samaa TV.
- Coke Studio: 12

Rahat Fateh Ali Khan is a Pakistani singer, who has sung several songs in Pakistan and India, including the Pakistani film and drama industries, as well as Coke Studio and Bollywood. He is a well-known Qawwali singer, and has also sung many national songs and ghazals.

== Albums ==
=== Studio albums ===
Year	Album	Notes
Recorded: 1997 Released: 2004	Main Ne Usse Dekha Hai	Music by Nusrat Fateh Ali Khan; Vol. 1
	Tasveer	Vol. 11
	Bulbul Ko Phool	
	Jinan De Mahi Door Vasde	
	Maa Aur Dhee	Vol.13
	Taar Meri Berhi	Vol. 5
	Aankh Se Aankh Milao	Vol. 9
	Kabbe Wali Gali Vich Yaar Da Mukaan	Vol. 7
	Pilade Saqia	Vol. 2
	Ali Maula Ali	Vol. 3
	Sufiana Qalaam	Vol. 14
	Raba Mera Yaar Morh De	Vol.10
	Meri Tauba Karo Qabool	Vol. 15
	Saher Qareeb Hai	Vol. 17
	Sher-e-Khuda	Vol. 22
	Jashan-e-Eid Milad Al Nabi	Vol. 21
	Best of Khan	Vol. 12
	Best of Khan	Part 2; Vol. 6
	Pardesia 2	Vol. 20
	Mighty King	Vol. 23
	Cry For You	Vol. 1
	Voices From Above	Vol. 4
	Maine Bottle Se Karni Hai Shadi	Vol. 8
	Maah Jaanda Hoyaa	Vol. 4
	Aakhan Hijr Tere Ne Laaliyaan	Vol. 5
	Ishq Ankhiyon Cho Nindraan	Vol. 9
	Shahsawar-e-Karbala	Vol. 6
	Best Hits Rahat Fateh Ali Khan	
	Janasheen	Vol. 1
	Janasheen	Vol. 2
	Janasheen	Vol. 3
	Janasheen	Vol. 4
	Janasheen	Vol. 5
	Rut Sawan Ki	
	Sanu Rog Laun Waleya	
2001	Rahat	
	Aankh Se Ankh Milao	
	Pardesiya	
2007	Charkha	Rohail Hyatt Composer Producer
2009	Nazrana-e-Aqeedat	
2009	Koi Umeed	
2009	Remembering:	Ustad Nusrat Fateh Ali Khan Memorial Concert
2010	Remembering:	Alama Iqbal
2010	Remembering:	Mirza Ghalib
2012	Bina Mahi	
2012	Khooni Akhiyan	
2014	Chandigarh Da Chaska	
2014	Back 2 Love	
2016	Ramadan	
2023	Sahar	Sufiscore
2024	Dillagi	Virsa Heritage Revived

=== Compilations and collaborations ===
Year	Album	Notes
2010	Rahat – The Very Best of Rahat Fateh Ali Khan	Sony Music
2010	Forever... Rahat Fateh Ali Khan	T-Series
2010	Bhanwar – Rahat Fateh Ali Khan & Others	T-Series
2010	Rahat Fateh Ali Khan – The Best of Bollywood & More	Times Music
2010	Satnam Siri Wahe Guru	with Party
2011	Kinna Sohna	with Michael Brook
2011	The RFAK Session	with Tarli Digital; released in India as Rahat
2016	MTV Unplugged (India)	S5E6; 6 February
2020	Dhanak Kay Rang	Inter-Services Public Relations

== Soundtracks ==
=== Pakistani TV serials ===
Year	Serial	Song	Lyricist	Composer	Notes
2008	Chuban	"Ishq Bhi Hai Chuban"			
2008	Wilco	"Dharti"			
2009	Khuda Zameen Se Gaya Nahin	"Khuda Zameen Se Gaya Nahin"	Imran Raza	Bagga	
2009	Meri Zaat Zarra-e-Benishan	"Meri Zaat"		Farrukh Abid & Shoaib Farrukh	
2009	Ishq Junoon Deewangi	"Ishq Junoon Deewangi"	Momina Duraid	Waqar Ali	
2009	Anokha Bandan	"Bewafa"		Waqar Ali	
2009	Kaisa Yeh Junoon	"Kaisa Yeh Junoon"			
2010	Noor Bano	"Baat Kar Le"	Sabir Zafar	Waqar	
2010	Omer Dadi Aur Gharwale	"Main Sitara Subh-e-Umeed Ka"	Sabir Zafar	Farrukh & Shoaib	
2010	Jhumka Jaan	"Zindagi Ishq Hai"	Riffat Siraj	Farrukh & Shoaib	
2010	Bahu Rani	"Mann Bawra Lage Na Kaheen"		Waqar	co-singer Sanam Marvi
2010	Bharday Jholy	"Bharday Jholy"		Waqar	
2010	Ankh Salamat Andhey log	"Koi Diya"	Asim Raza	Bagga	co-singer Fariha Pervez
2010	Ijazat	"Ijazat"			
2010	Chein Aye Na	"Chein Aye Na"			
2010	Talluq	"Tumse Hai Talluk"		Farrukh & Shoaib	
2010	Phir Kab Milo Gay	"Phir Kab Milo Gay"			
2011	Zindagi Dhoop Tum Ghana Saya	"Zindagi Dhoop"	Sabir	Farrukh & Shoaib	
2011	Mere Charagar	"Mere Charagar"			
2011	Kuch Pyar Ka Pagalpan	"Kuch Pyar Ka Pagalpan Bhi Tha"	Sabir	Waqar	
2011	Jal Pari	"Chand Mah"	Sarmad Sehbai	Farrukh & Shoaib	
2011	Thori Si Wafa Chahiye	"Thori Si Wafaa Chahiye"	Ayub Khawar	Waqar	
2011	Ik Yaad Hai	"Ik Yaad Hai"	Syed Wasi Shah	Farrukh	
2011	Kaisi Yeh Agan	"Kaisi Yeh Agan"		Waqar	
2012	Nadamat	"Nadamat"	Sabir	Waqar	
2012	Bus Ik Tera Intizar	"Bus Ik Tera Intizar"	Syed Wasi Shah	Naveed Nashad	
2012	Emaan	"Emaan"	Sabir	Farrukh	
2012	PTV (Note: Ramzan transmission)	"Noor e Khuda"			
2012	Pathjar Ke Baad	"Patjhar Ke Baad"	Sabir	Farrukh & Shoaib	
2013	Ishq e Mamnoon	"Ishq e Mamnoon"			
2013	Geo Kahani OST	"Ye Hai Geo Kahani"			
2014	Kissey Apna Kahein	"Kissey Apna Kahein"	Ayub Khawar	Waqar	
2014	Mere Meherbaan	"Mere Meherbaan"	Sabir	Farrukh & Shoaib	
2014	Aahista Aahista	"Aahista Aahista"	Sabir	Bagga	
2014	Sadqay Tumhare	"Sadqay Tumhare"	Imran	Bagga	
2014	ARY Zindagi OST	"Zindagi Se Milain"			
2014	Khata	"Khata"			
2015	Karb	"Karb"	Sabir	Bagga	
2015	Paiwand	"Mahiya Ve Mahiya"		Waqar	
2015	Guzaarish	"Kise Da Yaar Na Vichde"	Khawaja Pervaiz	Bagga	
2015	Maan	"Maan"	Fatima Najeeb	Raheel Fayyaz	
2015	Preet Na Kariyo Koi	"Ab Koi Preet Na Kariyo"	Imran	Bagga	
2016	Mera Yaar Mila Dey	"Mera Yaar Mila Dey"	Sabir	Waqar	
2016	Dil Lagi	"Tumhe Dillagi"		Bagga	
2016	Zara Yaad Kar	"Zara Yaad Kar"	Khalil ur Rehman Qamar	Bagga	
2016	Tum Kon Piya	"Tum Kon Piya"	S.K. Khalish	Bagga	
2016	Sang-e-Mar Mar	"Sang E Mar Mar"	Imran	Bagga	
2016	Bin Roye	"Teray Bin Jeena"	Sabir	Bagga	
2016	Yeh Ishq	"Ae Rakhra Ishq"	Asma Sayani		
2017	Pinjra	"Pinjra"			
2017	Mohabbat Tumse Nafrat Hai	"Mohabbat Tumse Nafrat Hai"	Khalil	Bagga	
2017	News One (Pakistani TV channel)	"Barket-e-Ramzan"			
2017	Geo Entertainment	"Dil Dil Ramzan"			
2017	Hari Hari Churiyaan	"Hari Hari Churiyaan"	Ayub Khawar	Waqar	
2017	Zard Patay Sa Yeh Dil	"Jese Mitti Ka Ho Ik Diya"	Ayub Khawar	Waqar	
2017	Mubarak Ho Beti Hui Hai	"Tanhai"			
2017	Laal Ishq	"Laal Ishq"	Khalil	Ameer Feroz	
2017	Khaani	"Ishq Ishq"	S.K. Khalish, Bagga	Bagga	
2017	Aisi Hai Tanhai	"Aisi Hai Tanhai"		Waqar	
2018	Rabbaway	"Rabbaway"			
2018	Seep	"Subhaan Hay Wo Khaliq"	Imran	Bagga	
2018	Khasara	"Khasaara"	Adnan Dhool	Soch	
2018	Koi Chand Rakh	"Koi Chand Rakh	Sabir	Shani Arshad	
2019	Geo Entertainment	"Ehsaas Ramzan"			
2019	Mere Paas Tum Ho	"Mere Paas Tum Ho"	Khalil	Nashad	
2020	Ehd-e-Wafa	"Sab Ehd-e-Wafa Ke Naam Kia"	Imran	RFAK	
2020	Mera Dil Mera Dushman	"Mera Dil Mera Dushman"	Qamar Nashad	Nashad	
2020	Jalan	"Jalan"	Imran	Nashad	
2020	Qarar	"Qarar"	Asim Raza	Waqar	
2020	Faryaad	"Meri Dharkan Ki Sadaaon Ko Jalane Walay"	Ahson Talish & Qamar Nashad	Nashad	
2021	Khuda Aur Mohabbat	"Khuda Aur Mohabbat"	Qamar Nashad	Nashad	
2021	Ishq Hai	"Ishq Hai"	Sabir	Waqar	
2021	Ek Jhoota Lafz Mohabbat	"Bara Shauq Tha"	Sabir	Waqar	
2021	Wafa Be Mol	"Be Mol Wafa"	Sabir	Nashad	
2021	Berukhi	"Berukhi"	Mubashir Hassan	Qasim Azhar	
2021	Baddua	"Baddua"	Asim Raza		
2021	Dil-e-Momin	"Dil-e-Momin"	Qamar Nashad	Nashad	
2022	Ye Ishq Samajh Na Aae	"Ye Ishq Samajh Na Aae"	Kamran Khan	Soch the Band	
2022	Ibn-e-Hawwa	"Kese Samjhaun Tujhe"	Qamar Nashad	Nashad	
2022	Pyar Deewangi Hai	"Pyar Deewangi Hai"	Sabir	Waqar	
2022	Kaisi Teri Khudgarzi	"Kaisi Teri Khudgharzi"	Ali Imran	Asim Raza	
2023	Kabuli Pulao	"Aankhein"	Sahir Ali Bagga	Imran Raza	
2024	Sunn Mere Dil	"Sunn Mere Dil"	Qamar Nashad	Naveed Nashad	

=== Pakistani film ===
Year	Film	Song	Notes
1997	Mard Jeenay Nahi Detay	"Kisi Roz Milo Hamein Shaam Dhaley"	
1998	Harjaai	"Tere Yaad"	
1999	Pal Do Pal	"Pal Do Pal Hain Pyar Ke"	
2011	Khamosh Raho	"Tere Honton Ko Salaam"	
2011	Khamosh Raho	"Ishq Mein Jeena"	
2011	Khamosh Raho	"Khamosh Raho"	
2011	Love Mein Ghum	"Haal Da Mehram"	
2011	Bhai Log	"Gunahgaar"	
2012	Burrahh!!	"Rabba Keri Gal Di Saza"	
2012	Mere Yaar Kaminey	"Akhiyan Kar K Pyar"	
2013	Armaan	"Akelay Na Jaana"	
2013	Dil Mera Dharkan Teri	"Juda Juda"	
2013	Aina	"Mujhe Dil Se Na Bhulana"	
2013	Ishq Khuda	"Sajna Aa Saja De"	
2013	Ishq Khuda	"Ab Lagan Lagi"	
2013	Main Hoon Shahid Afridi	"Malal"	
2013	Zinda Bhaag	"Pyar Yar Da"	
2014	Sultanat		
2014	Tamanna	"Koi Dil Mein"	Winner 14th London Asian Film Festival for The Best Music Talent (2012)
2014	Dukhtar	"Ya Rahem"	
2014	Dukhtar	"Maula Maula"	
2014	Oh Yaara Ainvayi Ainvayi Lut Gaya	"Tere Naal"	Romantic Song
2015	Dildariyaan	"Rab Kise Di Na Todhe"	Featuring Jaspinder Narula
2015	Faraar	"Hathan Diyan Lakhiran"	
2015	Bin Roye	"Teray Bin Jeena"	
2015	Halla Gulla	"Saroor De"	
2016	Maalik	"Mann Mora"	
2016	Maalik	"Nazriya"	
2016	Hijrat	"Maula"	
2016	Hijrat	"Khush Aamdeed"	
2016	Ishq Positive	"Rab Diyan Rab Jaane"	
2016	Actor in Law	"Khudaya"	
2017	Balu Mahi	"Rang De Chunar"	
2017	Raasta	"Dil Faqeer"	
2017	Arth - The Destination	"Sanwar De Khudaya"	
2017	Arth - The Destination	"Murshed Ji"	
2018	Azaadi		
2018	Na Band Na Baraati	"Sajan Bin Raina"	
2019	Parey Hut Love	"Zehal-e-Miskeen"	
2022	Chaudhry – The Martyr	"Nazr e Karam"	
TBA	Gidh †	Film status unknown	

=== Indian films ===
Year	Film	Song	Notes
2003	Paap	"Laal (Alaap)" "Mann Ki Lagan"	"Mann Ki Lagan" was a composition by Nusrat Fateh Ali Khan
2004	Ishq Qayamt	"Maine Use Dekha Hai" "Kisi Roz Milo Hamein Shaam Dhaley"	Latter song taken from Lollywood film Mard Jeenay Nahi detay
2005	Kalyug	"Jiya Dhadak Dhadak"	
2006	Omkara	"Naina"	
2007	Jhoom Barabar Jhoom	"Bol Na Halke Halke"	
2007	Om Shanti Om	"Jag Soona Soona Lage"	
2007	Namaste London	"Main Jahaan Rahoon"	with Krishna Beura
2007	Aaja Nachle	"O Re Piya"	Also used in Malaysian movie, Talentime
2008	Singh Is Kinng	"Teri Ore"	with Shreya Ghoshal
2008	Haal–e–dil	"Haal-E-Dil"	
2008	Woodstock Villa	"Koi Chala Ja Raha Hai"	
2008	Dil Kabaddi	"Zindagi Ye"	Special appearance
2009	Aasma: The Sky Is the Limit	"Man Bawra"	
2009	Main Aurr Mrs Khanna	"Rabba"	
2009	Billu	"Jahoon Kahan"	
2009	Love Aaj Kal	"Ajj Din Chadheya"	Winner Star Screen Award for Best Male Playback (2010); Nominated Filmfare Award for Best Male Playback Singer (2010)
2009	Dekh Bhai Dekh	"Aankhon Mein Kyon" "Sapne Bhaye Hain"	
2009	Jag Jeondeyan De Mele	"Jag Jeondeyan De Mele"	
2009	London Dreams	"Khwab Jo"	
2009	De Dana Dan	"Rishte Nate"	
2010	Veer	"Surili Akhiyon Wale" "Surili Akhiyon Wale" (duet)	
2010	My Name Is Khan	"Sajda"	Winner Mirchi Music Awards Best song in Sufi Tradition (2011); Nominated Filmfare Award for Best Male Playback Singer (2011)
2010	Ishqiya	"Dil To Bachcha Hai Ji"	Winner Star Screen Award for Best Male Playback (2011); Winner Filmfare Award for Best Male Playback Singer (2011)
2010	Toh Baat Pakki!	"Phir Se"	
2010	Lahore	"Ore Bande"	
2010	Badmaash Company	"Fakeera"	
2010	Virsa	"Mein Tenu Samjhawan"	
2010	I Hate Luv Storys	"Bahara" "Bahara" (Chill Version)	
2010	Milenge Milenge	"Ishq Ki Gali"	
2010	Once Upon a Time in Mumbaai	"Tum Jo Aaye" "Tum Jo Aaye" (reprise)	
2010	We Are Family	"Ankhon Mein Neendein"	
2010	Dabangg	"Tere Mast Mast Do Nain"	also duet with Shreya Ghoshal; Winner BIG Star Entertainment Awards Best Singer (2010); Winner Mirchi Music Awards Best Male Vocalist (2011); Winner 2011 IIFA Awards Best Male Vocalist (2011); Winner Apsara Award for Best Male Playback Singer (2011)
2010	Anjaana Anjaani	"Aas Pass Khuda"	
2010	Aakrosh	"Man Ke Matt"	
2010	Knock Out	"Khushnuma Sa Ye Roshan Ho"	
2011	Yamla Pagla Deewana	"Chadha De Rang"	
2011	Satrangee Parachute	"Teri Lori Yaad hai"	
2011	Ready	"Meri Ada Bhi"	
2011	Khap	"Aaina Dekha"	
2011	Bodyguard	"Teri Meri" "Teri Meri" (Reprise)	with Shreya Ghoshal; Nominated Filmfare Award for Best Male Playback Singer (2012)
2011	Mere Brother Ki Dulhan	"Isq Risk"	
2011	Mausam	"Rabba Main Toh Mar Gaya Oye"	Version 2
2011	Aazaan	"Affreen" (reprise)	
2011	Miley Naa Miley Hum	"Nazar Se Nazar Na mile"	
2011	I am Singh	"Kya jeena, Doorie hai"	
2012	Jodi Breakers	"Mujhko Teri Zaroorat Hai"	
2012	Will You Marry Me	"Soniya"	
2012	Tezz	"Tere Bina"	
2012	Blood Money	"Chaahat"	
2012	Mirza The Untold Story	"Akhiyan"	Winner PTC Punjabi Film Awards Best Playback Singer Male 2013
2012	Jannat 2	"Tera Deedar Hua"	
2012	Dangerous Ishq	"Tu Hi Rab" "Naina"	with Himesh Reshammiya, Shreya Ghoshal
2012	Teri Meri Kahaani	"Allah Jaane"	
2012	Heroine	"Saaiyaan"	
2012	Son of Sardaar	"Bichdann" "Bichdann" (Reprise) "Yeh Jo Halki Halki Khumariya"	
2012	Burraaahh (Punjabi Movie)	"Rabba"	
2012	Dabangg 2	"Dagabaaz Re"	
2013	Zindagi 50-50	"Rabba"	
2013	Ishkq in Paris	"Saiyaan Na Jaa Rey"	
2013	Rangrezz	"Dil Ko Aya Sukoon"	
2013	Nautanki Saala	"Sapna Mera Toota"	
2013	Commando	"Sawan Bairi"	
2013	Maazii	"Maula"	
2013	Naughty Jatts	"Hun nai jeena"	
2013	Kaash Tum Hote	"Agar Maangu Tum Yeh Dil"	
2013	Phata Poster Nikla Hero	"Mere Bina Tu" "Mere Bina Tu" (Duet)	
2014	Dedh Ishqiya	"Dil ka Mizaj Ishqiya" "Zabaan jale hai"	
2014	Jatt James Bond	"Rog Pyaar De Dilan Nu" "Tera Mera Saath Ho"	
2014	Khwaabb	"Shamein"	
2014	life is beautiful	"Sajna Ve"	
2014	Desi Kattey	"Tak Dhoom"	
2014	Double Di Trouble	"Aisi Mulaqaat"	
2014	Mere Yaar Kamine	"Akhiyan Rondiyan Rehndiya"	
2015	Dolly Ki Doli	"Mere Naina Kafir Hogaye"	
2015	Barkhaa	"Tu Itni Khoobsurat Hai"	
2015	I Love Desi	"Dheere Dheere Kam Hogi Udaasi"	
2015	Hero Naam Yaad Rakhi	"Deed Teri"	
2015	Hero Naam Yaad Rakhi	"Naina"	
2015	Hero Naam Yaad Rakhi	"Piya Piya"	separately released later in 2018
2015	Bajrangi Bhaijaan	"Zindagi" (Reprise)	
2015	Drishyam	"Dum Ghutta Hai"	
2015	Hero	"Yadaan Teriyaan"	
2015	Meeruthiya Gangster	"Naina Tose Lage"	
2016	Rocky Handsome	"Aye Khuda"	
2016	Ishq Forever	"Bilkul Socha Na" "Mere Aankhon Se Nikle Aansoo"	
2016	Sultan	"Jag Ghoomeya" "Raula Paye Gaya"	Nominated Filmfare Award for Best Male Playback Singer (2017)
2016	Ek Tera Saath	"Ek Tera Saath" (Title Track) "Aye Mere Khuda"	
2017	Laali Ki Shaadi Mein Laaddoo Deewana	"Rog Jaane"	
2017	Begum Jaan	"Aazadiyaan"	
2017	Maatr	"Zindagi Ae Zindagi"	
2017	Tubelight	"Tinka Tinka Dil Mera"	
2017	Baadshaho	"Mere Rashke Qamar"	with Nusrat Fateh Ali Khan
2017	Bhoomi	"Lag Ja Gale"	
2017	Firangi	"Sahiba Russ Gayiya"	
2018	Welcome to New York	"Ishtehaar"	
2018	Raid	"Sanu Ek Pal Chain"	
2018	Raid	"Nit Khair Manga"	
2018	October	"Tab Bhi Tu"	
2018	Mar Gaye Oye Loko	"Rabba Ve"	
2018	Batti Gul Meter Chalu	"Dekhte Dekhte"	Version 2
2018	Namastey England	"Tu Meri Main Tera"	with Altamash Faridi, Shadab Faridi
2018	Baazaar	"Adhura Lafz"	Pratibha Singh
2018	Zero	"Tanha Hua"	with Jyoti Nooran
2018	Simmba	"Tere Bin"	with Asees Kaur
2019	Do Dooni Panj	"Fikar"	with Neha Kakkar

== Replaced film songs ==
Year	Film	#	Song	Composer(s)	Lyricist(s)	Replaced By	Ref.
2019	P Se Pyaar F Se Faraar	1	"Parindey"	Ripul Sharma		Rituraj Mohanty	
2019	Dabangg 3	2	"Naina Lade"	Sajid–Wajid	Irshad Kamil	Javed Ali	
2019	Dabangg 3	3	"Habibi Ke Nain"	Sajid–Wajid	Irshad Kamil	Jubin Nautiyal	

== Singles ==
=== Pakistani ===
Year	Song	Notes
2009	"Hum Pakistan"	
2010	"Aman ki Asha"	co-singer Shankar Mahadevan
2012	"Quaid e Zi Waqar"	Tribute to Quaid-e-Azam Muhammad Ali Jinnah
2013	"Hum Dekhenge"	(Note: for Pakistan Tehreek-e-Insaf)
2013	"Chalo Chalo Imran Kay Sath"	(Note: for Pakistan Tehreek-e-Insaf)
2014	"Sun Sakhiye"	
2014	"Shukriya Pakistan"	for campaign of same name by ARY Digital Network (Note: Independence Day)
2015	"Sher Dil Shaheen"	(Note: Tribute to Pakistan Air Force) (Note: Defence Day)
2015	"Pakistan Say Rishta"	
2016	"Tum Zinda Ho"	Tribute to 2014 APS martyrs; co-singer Hina Nasrullah; poet Amjad Islam Amjad
2016	"Paniyon Pe Chalen"	(Note: Tribute to Pakistan Navy)
2016	"Pakistan Jiya Hai"	
2016	"Khak Jo Khoon Mein"	
2016	"Pakistan Zindaabad"	
2016	"Maa Kay Qadmon Say"	(Note: Tribute to Pakistan Army)
2017	"Allah Shukar Hai"	
2017	"Hum Sab Ka Pakistan"	Pakistan Day
2017	"Mera Ghar Hai Yaad Rakho"	
2018	"Dam Mast Qalandar"	recreated by Usman Dar
2018	"Uth Watan Ke Nojawan"	
2018	"Ballay Pay Nishan"	
2018	"Kar Aghaaz Pakistan"	
2018	"Vichora"	
2019	"Aye Watan"	
2020	"Charhta Suraj"	Lyrics by Imran Raza, composed by Bagga

=== Coke Studio (Pakistan) ===
Year	Season	Song	Lyrics	Music	Co-singer(s)
2008	1	"Shama Payian"		Rohail Hyatt	
2008	1	"Garaj Baras"	Sabir Zafar	Rohail Hyatt	Ali Azmat
2008	1	"Ballaman"		Rohail Hyatt	Ali Azmat
2008	1	"Dildara"		Rohail Hyatt	
2014	7	"Chhaap Tilak Sab Chheeni"	Amir Khusrow	Strings	Abida Parveen
2016	9	"Aye Rah-e-Haq Ke Shaheedo"		Strings	Season's ft. artistes
2016	9	"Afreen Afreen"	Javed Akhtar F K Khalish	NFAK Faakhir Mehmood	Momina Mustehsan
2016	9	"Sadaa"		Shani Arshad	
2016	9	"Aaj Rang Hai"	Amir Khusrow	Shani Arshad	Amjad Sabri
2017	10	"Qaumi Taranah"	Hafeez Jullundhri	Strings; originally composed by Ahmed Ghulamali Chagla	Season's ft. artistes
2017	10	"Sayonee"	Sabir Zafar Shah Hussain	originally and recomposed by Salman Ahmad of Junoon	Ali Noor
2017	10	"Rangrez"	Sajid Gul	Sahir Ali Bagga	
2019	12	"Dam Mastam"		Rahat Fateh Ali Khan	
2019	12	"Heeray"		Javed Ali Khan	Aima Baig
2020	13	"Dil Tarpe"	Rahat Fateh Ali Khan	Rahat Fateh Ali Khan & Zara Madani	Zara Madani

=== Other music videos and collaborations ===
Year	Song	Lyrics	Music	Co-singer(s)	Notes
2002	"Maki Madni"	The Derek Trucks Band			Joyful Noise
2009	"Ghum Suhm Ghum Suhm"	Sukshinder Shinda			Collaborations 2
2010	"Garaj Baras" (Spiritual and Material)	Sabir Zafar		Aamir Zaki Gumby	
2010	"Imtehan Hai Imtehan"			Shafqat Amanat Ali Khan	
2011	"Ghida Boliye"	DJ Vix Roshan Prince			Ultimate
2012	"Dil Mera"	Panjabi Hit Squad			World Famous
2012	"Bateyn Kartay Raho"		Farrukh Abid Shoaib Farrukh		Sab Keh Do; by Zong Pakistan
2013	"Sakeeriyaan"	Bunty Bains	Tigerstyle	Ishmeet Narula	Sakeeriyaan
2014	"Raah Vi Tere Naam"	Gary Waraich	Rimi Dhar		
2016	"Mast Qalandar"	Amir Khusrow Bulleh Shah	Sami Yousuf	Sami Yusuf	Barakah
2016	"Tumhe Dillagi"	Purnam Allahabadi Manoj Muntashir	NFAK Salim–Sulaiman		ft. Huma Qureshi and Vidyut Jammwal
2016	"Halka Halka"	Rashmi Virag	Abhijit Vaghani		ft. Ayushmann Khurrana and Amy Jackson
2017	"Saware"	Anupama Raag			Saware
2017	"Mushkilaan"	Waqar Ex	Ayaz Sonu	Waqar Ex	
2017	"Main Zalmi Hoon"	Shahabuddin Shahab	Sahir Ali Bagga		Peshawar Zalmi official anthem
2017	"Musafir"	Saji Ali	Kamran Akhtar	Arslan Syed	
2017	"Zamana Hum Se Hai"				QMobile theme song; ft. Fawad Khan
2017	"Judaiya"	Zahid Ali Asif Munir	Zahid Ali	Naseebo Lal	
2017	"Na Jaave"	Zain Khan Mujtaba Ali	Zain Khan	Satbir	
2017	"Banjarey"	Anupama Raag			ft. Neetu Chandra
2017	"Ishq"			DJ Raj	
2018	"Yeh Zindagi"	Sahir Ali Bagga			
2018	"Naino Nay Tere"	Asif Khan	Ayaz Sonu		ft. Ahsan Khan and Aleeze Nasser
2018	"Allah Tero Naam"		The Fusion Project	Kaushiki Chakraborty	ft. Rukmini Vijayakumar
2018	"O Jaana"	Asim Raza	Sahir Ali Bagga	Hamza Malik	starring Hamza Malik and Iqra Aziz; video directed by Farhan Saeed
2018	"Dil Zaffran"	Raqeeb Alam	Ravi Shankar		ft. Shivin Narang and Palak
2018	"Dhadkane"	Javed Ali Khan	RFAK		OnePlus Playback S01
2018	"Bungee Jumping"	ft. in Naughty Boy's upcoming album, with Emeli Sandé			
2019	"Teri Yaad"	Sunny Brown			starring Rohit Reddy and Anita Hassanandani Reddy; video directed by Raj Kundra and Robin Behl
2019	"Zindagi"	Javed Ali Khan	RFAK		ft. Hanine El Alam; video directed by Josan Sandeep
2024	"Biakul Jiyara - The Legacy"	Bulleh Shah & Amir Khusrau		Shahzaman Ali Khan	The Artist Season 1, AAA Records

== Extra notes ==
Key
†	Denotes song or film that has not been released yet

== See also ==
- List of awards and nominations received by Rahat Fateh Ali Khan
