= List of awards and nominations received by Rahat Fateh Ali Khan =

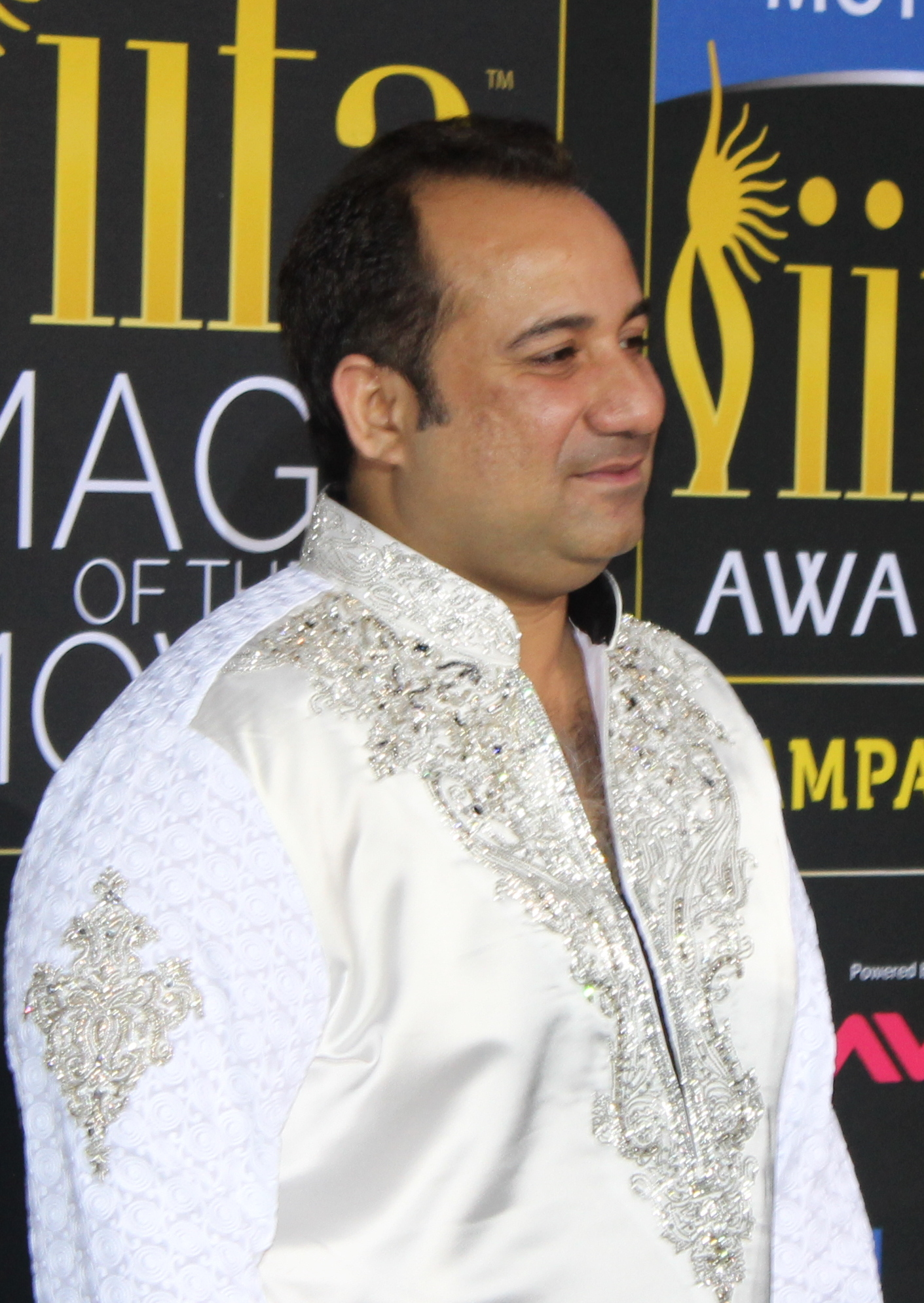
- RFAK at the 15th IIFA Awards in 2014.
Awards	Wins	Nominations
Lux Style Awards	5	1
ARY Film Awards	2	0
Hum Awards	2	1
Pakistan Media Awards	2	0
UK Asian Music Awards	4	0
Filmfare Awards	1	4
IIFA Awards	1	4
Star Screen Awards	2	0
Producers Guild Film Awards	1	3
Mirchi Music Awards	3	4
Internat. Pakistan Prestige Awards	1	0
PTC Punjabi Film Awards	1	0
London Asian Film Festival	1	0
BIG Star Entert. Awards	1	0
The Musik Awards	1	0
Masala Lifestyle Popular Choice Awards	1	0
- Totals (Note: Certain award groups do not award just one winner. They recognize several different recipients, have runners-up, and have a third place. Since this is a specific recognition and is different from losing an award, runner-up mentions are considered wins in this award tally. For simplification and to avoid errors, each award in this list has been presumed to have had a prior nomination.)
Awards	27
Nominations	18

Rahat Fateh Ali Khan is a Pakistani Sufi singer and musician, primarily of Qawwali, devotional music of the Muslim Sufis. He has won awards including Lux Style Awards, UK Asian Music Awards, ARY Film Awards, and Hum Awards.

On June 26, 2019, Rahat was awarded an Honorary Doctorate of Music by the University of Oxford. He also won the Wembley Arena Award in 2019. Rahat has won four Lux Style Awards and four UK Asian Music Awards. He also has been nominated four times for Filmfare Awards, four times for IIFA Awards, and four times for Mirchi Music Awards. Rahat received a Lifetime Achievement Award from, and honorary membership in, the Arts Council of Pakistan in Karachi.

== Lux Style Awards ==
Year	Drama/Film	Nomination	Category	Result	Ref.
2014	Main Hoon Shahid Afridi	"Malaal"	Song of the Year	Won	
2016	Bin Roye	"Teray Bina Jeena"	Best Male Playback	Won	
2017	Yeh Ishq	"Yeh Ishq"	Best TV OST	Nominated	
2018	Arth 2	"Sanwar De Khudaya"	Best Male Singer	Won	
2019	Khaani	"Kaisa Yeh Marz Hai Ishq Ishq"	Best TV OST	Won	
2021	Ehd-e-Wafa	"Sab Ehd-e-Wafa Ke Naam Kiya"	Best TV Soundtrack	Won	

== ARY Film Awards ==
Year	Drama/Film	Nomination	Category	Result	Ref.
2014	Zinda Bhaag	"Pata Yaar Da"	ARY Film Award for Best Male Playback Singer	Won	
2016	Halla Gulla	"Saroor De"	ARY Film Award for Best Male Playback Singer	Won	

== Hum Awards ==
Year	Drama/Film	Nomination	Category	Result	Ref.
2013	Nadamat	"Nadamat"	Hum Award for Best Original Soundtrack	Nominated	
2015	Sadqay Tumhare	"Sadqay Tumhare"	Hum Award for Best Original Soundtrack	Won	
2016	Karb	"Karb"	Hum Award for Best Original Soundtrack	Won	

== Pakistan Media Awards ==
The Pakistan Media Awards (commonly known as the PMA), are a set of awards given annually for radio, television, film, and theater achievements. The awards are given each year at a formal ceremony.

Year	Category	Result	Ref.
2011	Best Male Singer	Won	
2013	Best Male Singer	Won	

== UK Asian Music Awards ==
Year	Drama/Film	Nomination	Category	Result	Ref.
2010	N/A		Best International Act	Won	
2012	N/A		International Artist of the Decade	Won	
2012	N/A		Best International Act	Won	
2012	Bodyguard	"Teri Meri"	Best Selling Download	Won	

== Filmfare Awards ==
The Filmfare Awards are a set of awards that honour artistic and technical excellence in the Hindi-language film industry of India. Rahat has been nominated five times and won one award.

Year	Drama/Film	Nomination	Category	Result	Ref.
2010	Love Aaj Kal	"Aaj Din Chadheya"	Filmfare Award for Best Male Playback Singer	Nominated	
2011	Ishqiya	"Dil To Bachcha Hai"	Filmfare Award for Best Male Playback Singer	Won	
2011	My Name is Khan	"Sajda"	Filmfare Award for Best Male Playback Singer	Nominated	
2012	Bodyguard	"Teri Meri"	Filmfare Award for Best Male Playback Singer	Nominated	
2017	Sultan	"Jag Ghoomeya"	Filmfare Award for Best Male Playback Singer	Nominated	

== IIFA Awards ==
The International Indian Film Academy Awards (also known as the IIFA Awards) are a set of awards presented annually by the International Indian Film Academy to honor both artistic and technical excellence of professionals in Bollywood, the Hindi language film industry. Atif Aslam has won one award, with four additional nominations.

Year	Drama/Film	Nomination	Category	Result	Ref.
2006	Kalyug	"Jiya Dhadak Dhadak Jaye"	IIFA Award for Best Male Playback Singer	Nominated	
2010	Love Aaj Kal	"Ajj Din Chadheya"	IIFA Award for Best Male Playback Singer	Nominated	
2011	Dabangg	"Tere Mast Mast Do Nain"	IIFA Award for Best Male Playback Singer	Won	
2011	Ishqiya	"Dil To Bachcha Hai"	IIFA Award for Best Male Playback Singer	Nominated	
2012	Bodyguard	"Teri Meri"	IIFA Award for Best Male Playback Singer	Nominated	

== Star Screen Awards ==
The Screen Awards is an annual awards ceremony held in India honoring professional excellence in Bollywood. Rahat has won twice.

Year	Drama/Film	Nomination	Category	Result	Ref.
2010	Love Aaj Kal	"Aaj Din Chadheya"	Screen Award for Best Male Playback	Won	
2011	Ishqiya	"Dil To Bachcha Hai"	Screen Award for Best Male Playback	Won	

== Producers Guild Film Awards ==
Year	Drama/Film	Nomination	Category	Result	Ref.
2006	Kalyug	"Jiya Dhadak Dhadak Jaye"	Producers Guild Film Award for Best Male Playback Singer	Nominated	
2011	Ishqiya	"Dil To Bachcha Hai"	Producers Guild Film Award for Best Male Playback Singer	Won	
2011	Dabangg	"Tere Mast Mast Do Nain"	Producers Guild Film Award for Best Male Playback Singer	Nominated	
2012	Bodyguard	"Teri Meri"	Producers Guild Film Award for Best Male Playback Singer	Nominated	

== Mirchi Music Awards ==
Year	Drama/Film	Nomination	Category	Result	Ref.
2010	My Name is Khan	"Sajda"	Best Song in Sufi Tradition	Won	
2010	My Name is Khan	"Sajda"	Male Vocalist of the Year	Nominated	
2010	Dabangg	"Tere Mast Mast Do Nain"	Male Vocalist of the Year	Won	
2011	Bodyguard	"Teri Meri"	Male Vocalist of the Year	Nominated	
2014	Back 2 Love	"Rab Jaane"	Indi Pop Song of the Year	Won	
2016	Sultan	"Jag Ghoomeya"	Male Vocalist of the Year	Nominated	
2017	Baadshaho	"Mere Rashke Qamar"	Male Vocalist of the Year	Nominated	

== Masala Lifestyle Popular Choice Awards ==
Year	Category	Result	Ref.
2008	Best Asian Concert	Won	

== The Musik Awards ==
Year	Drama/Film	Nomination	Category	Result	Ref.
2008	Bharday Jholy	"Bharday Jholy"	Best OST	Won	

== BIG Star Entertainment Awards ==
Big Star Entertainment Awards were presented annually by Reliance Broadcast Network Limited in association with Star India to honor personalities from the field of entertainment across movies, music, television, sports, theater, and dance.

Year	Drama/Film	Nomination	Category	Result	Ref.
2010	Dabangg	"Tere Mast Mast Do Nain"	Best Singer	Won	

== London Asian Film Festival ==
Year	Drama/Film	Nomination	Category	Result	Ref.
2012	Tamanna	"Koi Dil Mein"	Best Music Talent in a Film	Won	

== PTC Punjabi Film Awards ==
Year	Drama/Film	Nomination	Category	Result	Ref.
2013	Mirza – The Untold Story	"Akhiyan"	Best Playback Singer Male	Won	

== International Pakistan Prestige Awards ==
Year	Drama/Film	Nomination	Category	Result	Ref.
2017	Actor in Law	"Khudaya"	Best Singer	Nominated	

== See also ==
- List of awards and nominations received by Atif Aslam
- List of awards and nominations received by Ali Zafar
- Rahat Fateh Ali Khan discography
