= Coke Studio Pakistan season 2 =

Second television season of Coke Studio

Coke Studio Pakistan
- Season 2
- Coke Studio 2 cover
- Starring: Featured Artists
- No. of episodes: 5

Release
- Original network: YouTube
- Original release: June 14 – August 14, 2009

Season chronology
- ← Previous; Season 1 Next → Season 3

The second season of the Pakistani music television series Coke Studio Pakistan commenced airing on 14 June 2009 and ended on 14 August 2009 on Independence Day. The second series of Coke Studio included notable differences from the first series, including the fact that the live audiences were excluded. The series also ran for longer, this time there were five episodes in total and in each episode there were five or more performances by the featuring artists. Rohail Hyatt returned as the executive producer along with Umber Hyatt as the producer of the show.

== Artists ==
=== Vocalists ===
The second season featured Ali Zafar and Strings performing for the second time at Coke Studio as they were also part of the first season.

- Ali Zafar
- Arieb Azhar
- Atif Aslam
- Javed Bashir
- Josh
- Noori
- Riaz Ali Khan
- Saieen Zahoor
- Shafqat Amanat Ali Khan
- Strings
- Zeb and Haniya

=== Musicians ===
Season 2 saw an increase in the number of musicians in the house band.

House Band
- Dholak: Sikander Inam
- Drums: Louis 'Gumby' Pinto
- Bass Guitar: Kamran Zafar
- Guitar: Asad Ahmed and Omran 'Momo' Shafique
- Keyboard: Jaffer Ali Zaidi
- Violin: Javed Iqbal
- Percussions: Babar Khanna, Waris 'Baloo' Ali and Zulfiq 'Shazee' Ahmed Khan

Guest Musicians
- Flute: Baqir Abbas
- Sarangi: Gul Mohammad
- Tabla: Gupreet Channa
- Sitar: Rakae Jamil
- Rubab: Sadiq Sameer

Backing Vocals
- Natasha De Sousa
- Saba Shabbir

== Episodes ==
The second season began on 14 June 2009 and ended on the Independence Day of Pakistan, 14 August. Each episode was given an individual title and the episode titles were: Individuality, Harmony, Equality, Spirit and Unity respectively.

No. Overall	#	Song(s) Title	Artist(s)	Lyricist(s)	Language(s)	Original air date
Episode 1 - Individuality
5	1	Aik Alif	Saieen Zahoor & Noori	Bulleh Shah	Punjabi	14 June 2009
5	2	Aj Latha Naeeo	Javed Bashir	Nusrat Fateh Ali Khan	Punjabi	14 June 2009
5	3	Jal Pari	Atif Aslam	Atif Aslam	Urdu	14 June 2009
5	4	Khamaaj	Shafqat Amanat Ali Khan	Khamaj	Braj	14 June 2009
5	5	Paimona	Zeb and Haniya	Omar Khayyam	Persian	14 June 2009
Episode 2 - Harmony
6	6	Aankhon Kay Sagar	Shafqat Amanat Ali Khan	Shafqat Amanat Ali Khan	Urdu	28 June 2009
6	7	Dastaan	Ali Zafar	Ali Zafar, Bulleh Shah	Urdu	28 June 2009
6	8	Janay Do	Josh	Josh	Urdu	28 June 2009
6	9	Kinara	Atif Aslam & Riaz Ali Khan	Atif Aslam & Riaz Ali Khan	Punjabi & Urdu	28 June 2009
6	10	Toomba	Saieen Zahoor	Saieen Zahoor	Punjabi	28 June 2009
Episode 3 - Equality
7	11	Bari Barsi	Josh	Folk	Punjabi	12 July 2009
7	12	Chal Diyay	Zeb and Haniya & Javed Bashir	Haniya Aslam	Urdu	12 July 2009
7	13	Jo Meray	Noori	Noori	Urdu	12 July 2009
7	14	Wasta Pyar Da	Atif Aslam	Nusrat Fateh Ali Khan	Punjabi & Urdu	12 July 2009
7	15	Yaar Daddi	Ali Zafar	Ustaad Muhammad Juman	Seraiki	12 July 2009
Episode 4 - Spirit
8	16	Bulleya	Riaz Ali Khan	Folk	Punjabi	26 July 2009
8	17	Chup	Zeb and Haniya	Zeb and Haniya	Urdu	26 July 2009
8	18	Mahi Ve	Josh & Shafqat Amanat Ali Khan	Josh	Punjabi	26 July 2009
8	19	Mai Ne	Atif Aslam	Folk	Punjabi	26 July 2009
8	20	Saari Raat	Noori	Noori	Urdu	26 July 2009
Episode 5 - Unity
9	21	Humain Kya Hua	Atif Aslam	Atif Aslam	Urdu	14 August 2009
9	22	Husn-e-Haqiqi	Arieb Azhar	Khwaja Ghulam Farid	Punjabi & Urdu	14 August 2009
9	23	Kedaar	Noori	Noori	Urdu	14 August 2009
9	24	Kuch Ajab Khail	Shafqat Amanat Ali Khan		Braj	14 August 2009
9	25	Nahi Ray Nahi	Ali Zafar	Ali Zafar	Urdu	14 August 2009
9	26	Rona Chor Dia	Zeb and Haniya & Javed Bashir	Zeb and Haniya	Urdu	14 August 2009
9	27	Titliyan	Strings	Strings	Urdu	14 August 2009

== Coke Studio Special ==
Coke Studio Special is part of the Coke Studio video web blog series which included special features such as unreleased performances from the second season of the show. The first video blog was released on 15 January 2010 and the last video blog was released on 16 May 2010, on the YouTube channel of the show.

No.	Song(s) Title	Artist(s)	Producer	Original release date
1	"Saari Raat Jaga (Unedited Version)"	Noori	Rohail Hyatt	February 1, 2010
2	"Hung (Percussion Jam)"	Gumby & Gupreet Channa	Rohail Hyatt	March 19, 2010
3	"Aj Latha Naeeo (Extended Version)"	Javed Bashir	Rohail Hyatt	May 16, 2010
