= Teefa in Trouble =

2018 Pakistani film directed by Ahsan Rahim

- Film poster
- Urdu: طیفا اِن ٹربل
- Directed by: Ahsan Rahim
- Written by: Ali Zafar; Ahsan Rahim; Danyal Zafar
- Produced by: Ali Zafar
- Starring: Ali Zafar; Maya Ali
- Narrated by: Ali Zafar
- Cinematography: Zain Haleem
- Edited by: Ahsan Rahim; Taha Ali
- Music by: Ali Zafar; Shani Arshad (score)
- Production company: Lightingale Productions
- Distributed by: Mandviwalla Entertainment; Geo Films; Yash Raj Films
- Release date: 20 July 2018
- Running time: 155 minutes
- Country: Pakistan
- Languages: Urdu; Punjabi
- Budget: US$1.5 million
- Box office: Rs. 50 crore (US$1.8 million)

Teefa in Trouble (Urdu: طیفا اِن ٹرَبل) is a 2018 Pakistani romantic comedy action film. The film is the directorial debut of Ahsan Rahim, who was previously known for directing music videos and television commercials, under his Tadpole Films banner. It stars Ali Zafar, Abdullah Solangi and Maya Ali, who also made their Pakistani film debuts. It is also the debut film under Zafar's banner Lightingale Productions.

Pre-production work began in 2016 when Zafar, Rahim and Danyal Zafar wrote the story and screenplay. Principal photography took place in Lahore and Warsaw between 18 February and 26 July 2017. Ali Zafar also created the music, while Shani Arshad composed the film score. The film released on 20 July 2018. It was distributed by Mandviwalla Entertainment and Geo Films nationwide. It is the first non-Indian film which Yash Raj Films distributed internationally and the first non-Indian film whose music is owned by Junglee Music. At the time of its release, it was one of the most expensive Pakistani films ever made. It became the third Pakistani film to cross the Rs. 50 crore mark, despite facing protests and film piracy afterwards.

== Plot ==
The story revolves around Teefa, a witty middle-class Lahori boy who is raised by his mother since a young age. Teefa is introduced to the world of crime by the shady business dealer and local gangster Butt Sahab, and due to his impoverished upbringing, money and power are all that matter to him.

Anya is the bold and stubborn daughter of Bonzo, a childhood friend of Butt Sahab, who is now a successful business tycoon and multi-millionaire based in Warsaw, Poland. Butt Sahab plans to wed his goofy and spoilt son Billu Butt to the charming Anya, but Bonzo refuses and instead has plans to marry off his daughter to the son of another Pakistani tycoon, Mr. Bajwa, to build his connections. Meanwhile, Anya has a secret crush on her Polish friend Andy and tries to fend off her father and conniving stepmother Sophie's repeated marriage nagging, but to no avail. She finally gives in to her father's demands.

Butt Sahab, who is outraged at Bonzo for refusing his son's hand and is not willing to take no for an answer, enlists Teefa to take the first flight to Warsaw, kidnap Anya and bring her back to Pakistan, so he can arrange his son's wedding with her. Teefa is initially reluctant to do the job but relents when he is offered Rs. 10 lakh for his services. He lands in Poland and is helped in the mission by his comical friend Tony. Both do not have any intelligent plans for the kidnapping, having not done such a job before.

Their job is made easy when they sneak into Anya's family mansion on the day of her wedding and learn that she plans to run away, and in an absurd and unexpected twist of events, she acquiesces to them to stage her kidnapping. The story takes several comical turns once the trio is on the run, from one place to the next, escaping Bonzo's army of guards. Teefa gets into "trouble" when he begins to realize he is falling in love with Anya, while she too starts to slowly get attached to Teefa. She follows him to Lahore, where their journey of escape winds up when a heartbroken Anya eventually comes to realize the moment of truth. Teefa must now choose between love and money, at the cost of deceit, and decides to set things straight. The chase is far from over, as this time they must double-cross Butt and his goons, and Bonzo and his guards who are close behind their heels.

Teefa, torn between love and the promise of money, decides to set things right. The trio faces challenges from both sides – evading Butt Sahab and Bonzo, who are determined to bring Anya back.

== Cast ==
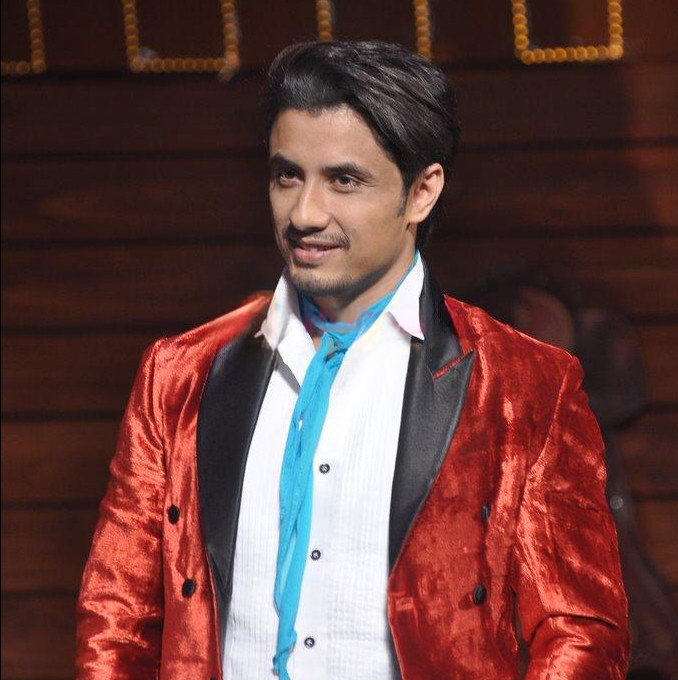
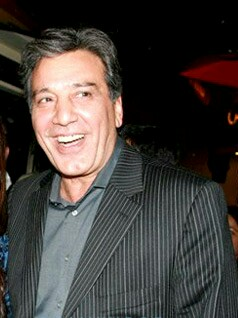
Ali Zafar (left) and Jawed Sheikh (right)
- Ali Zafar as Lateef "Teefa", called as "Teefay"
- Maya Ali as Anya
- Faisal Qureshi as Tony (Dot) Shah; Teefa's friend
- Mahenur Haider as Sara; Anya's friend
- Jawed Sheikh as Bashira "Bonzo"; Anya's father
- Sofia Khan as Sophie; Bonzo's wife and Anya's step-mother
- Mehmood Aslam as Butt Sahab
- Asma Abbas as Khalida Butt; Butt Sahab's wife
- Marhoom Ahmad Bilal as Billu Butt; Butt Sahab's son
- Nayyar Ejaz as Sheikh Sahab
- Simi Raheal as Teefa's widowed mother called as "Baybae" by him
- Tom Coulston as Andy

Additionally, stuntman Mehboob Shah plays the role of Bonzo's bodyguard Lee, and Salman Bokhari plays Sheikh's goon Shikra. Further, Jawad Bashir appears as Muhammad Asif and Kashmala Nauman as Billu Butt's wife. Also, Ranveer Singh makes a special appearance as an endorser for "Teefay De Tikkay".

== Production ==
=== Development ===
In 2014, Ali Zafar revealed to Dawn that his first Pakistani film production would "be directed by Ahsan Rahim". In September 2015, Zafar established a studio in his new house and named it Lightingale Studios. The film was announced on 18 October 2016 by Zafar and Rahim, reported The Express Tribune. It is Zafar's first Pakistani film as a lead after working in several Indian films and a small role in Lahore Se Aagey. Rahim also had directed some music videos for Zafar previously.

Zafar revealed the film title on 20 January, with the name of lead actress Maya Ali on 27 January 2017. She is known for many Pakistani dramas and has gained popularity on Indian television when her starring drama Aunn Zara aired there. On finalizing her debut film, she told The News that "it took me a while" because "I don't want people to relate it to any of my previous work(s)". Zafar commented that this film will show "what all she is capable of."

=== Casting and filming ===
Filming began on 18 February. The first spell took place in Lahore, Pakistan, and completed on 10 May after about 42 days. In April, Asma Abbas revealed her role in an interview with The Nation. Nayyar Ejaz, Simi Raheal, Mehmood Aslam and British actor Tom Coulston were also cast, along with Marhoom Ahmad Bilal in his film debut. The second spell then continued from 20 June in Warsaw, Poland. Jawed Sheikh, Mahenur Haider and Faisal Qureshi were cast, along with Fia Khan in her film debut. Filming wrapped up on 26 July, after about 30 days in Warsaw. Zain Haleem has served as the cinematographer. The song "Item Number" was shot in Bangkok, which took five days.

Sheikh revealed his role to The News; he further said, "I absolutely love traveling", as he had to work in many films that required traveling including this. The film marked the return of Aslam to the industry after 28 years; he said, "I finally got the role which I always wanted to play." Maya Ali commented to Pakistan Today, "I couldn't have found a better film than Teefa to make my cinematic debut." Zafar told Khaleej Times that he was interested in witnessing the characters he had developed come to life, with each actor who brought their concepts to their characters.

=== Promotion ===
Zafar said in an interview with Newsline, "I wrote the story along with the director." "We started off with an idea to make an action comedy, then romance came into play and then the songs…", he said to Dawn. He further told The News that he had "studied books on screenplays to learn how it's done." He further said that the architectural shots and the action sequences would be something like never been seen before, for which he prepared himself physically and disallowed his stunt double. He told The Express Tribune that it has been designed to "provide a cinematic experience that hasn't been done here yet", and added to Dawn that this may be "the most expensive Pakistani production", further said to The News, "We need to think out of the box and see how international cinema works". He told IANS that the film has a message "about the journey more than the destination".

He revealed the film logo at the opening ceremony of the 2017 Pakistan Super League on 9 February, followed by his "Ab Khel Jamay Ga" performance. On 20 April, he performed his original song "Ishq" with Maya Ali at the 16th Lux Style Awards. The film teaser was released during the opening ceremony of the 2018 Pakistan Super League on 22 February, where Zafar flew around the stadium on a hoverboard while performing his rendition of "Teefa", followed by his "Dil Se Jaan Laga De" performance.

Rahim told The News that they started shooting "on the 10th or 12th draft" after more than six months in pre-production. He said that a film should not look like "a TV serial, it should be larger than life and the story should be engaging". He said to Pakistan Today, "If a director cannot tell a story effectively, he cannot make a good film." He commented that it is "difficult to be fully satisfied with one's own work", but he gave his best to the film, so it "belongs to the public" after him. Zafar's wife, Ayesha Fazli, has served as the co-producer.

Zafar is the first Pakistani to be invited to the 5th Silk Road International Film Festival (SRIFF), held in China in October 2018. He proposed the collaboration between Pakistani and Chinese artists and to release at least three Pakistani films in China to extend the business. Teefa in Trouble was also screened to over 30 Chinese mainstream distributors at the festival in Fuzhou.

== Soundtrack ==
Teefa in Trouble

Soundtrack album by Ali Zafar
- Released: 6 July 2018
- Recorded: 2016–17
- Venues: Lahore, Pakistan
- Studio: Lightingale Studios
- Genre: Feature film soundtrack
- Length: 21:45
- Languages: Urdu; Punjabi; English
- Labels: Lightingale; Junglee Music
- Producers: Naqash Haider; Baqir Abbas; Shani Arshad; Ali Zafar

Ali Zafar chronology
| Total Siyapaa (2014) | Teefa in Trouble (2018) | Roshni (2025) |

Singles from Teefa in Trouble
- 1. "Ishq Nachaunda" Released: 22 July 2018; 2. "Butt Sahab" Released: 10 August 2018

Mid-Day reported in January 2017 that Zafar said, "I am also working on the music of the movie". He told The Express Tribune that the playback voice for Maya Ali would "be Aima Baig, not five different voices", adding that "I wanted every song to be a movie-hit song." Like Zafar's previous albums, this time too his brother, Danyal Zafar, helped him with the music. Lightingale Productions collaborated with Junglee Music for the international distribution of the soundtrack, which was released on 6 July 2018.

=== Track listing ===
| No. | Title | Vocals | Lyrics | Producers | Length |
|---|---|---|---|---|---|
| 1 | "Chan Ve" | Ali Zafar, Aima Baig | Ali Zafar | Ali Zafar, Naqash Haider | 3:48 |
| 2 | "Item Number" | Ali Zafar, Aima Baig | Ali Zafar | Ali Zafar, Naqash Haider | 2:47 |
| 3 | "Butt Sahab" | Ali Zafar, Various Artists | Ali Zafar | Ali Zafar, Shani Arshad | 2:25 |
| 4 | "Sajna Door" | Ali Zafar, Aima Baig | Ali Zafar, Danyal Zafar (English) | Ali Zafar, Baqir Abbas | 4:19 |
| 5 | "Ishq Nachaunda" | Ali Zafar | Ali Zafar, S. M. Saddique | Ali Zafar, Baqir Abbas | 4:56 |
| 6 | "Nahin Jaana" (Traditional) | Asma Abbas | Traditional | Shani Arshad | 3:29 |
| 7 | "Chan Ve (Remix)" | Ali Zafar, Aima Baig | Ali Zafar | Ali Zafar, Naqash Haider | 3:32 |
| | | | Total length: | | 25:17 |

=== Personnel ===
Adapted from YouTube:

- Danyal Zafar – guitars (track 5)
- Hassan Badshah – programmer (tracks: 4, 5)
- Donal Whenal, Levi Oven (MasteringWorld – UK) – stereo mastering (all tracks)
- Akash Pervaiz – stereo mix (tracks: 4, 5)
- Asad Ahmed – guitars (track 2)
- Amir Azhar – bass (track 2)

=== Score ===
In September 2018, Shani Arshad shared 4 tracks from the score listed below:

| No. | Title | Length |
|---|---|---|
| 1. | "Kidnapping" | 9:15 |
| 2. | "The Jump" | 3:11 |
| 3. | "The Train" | 1:34 |
| 4. | "The Knife Fight" | 1:42 |

== Release ==
The film trailer was released on 14 June 2018 across 1200 screens worldwide. The film released across 24 countries on 20 July, including some countries where this is the first Pakistani film, while in UAE on 19 July.

=== Home media ===
On 1 December 2018, the film was released in India and worldwide on Netflix, except in Pakistan and China. It was released on Iflix in Pakistan on 4 January 2019. It premiered on television by Geo Entertainment on 19 January. It was made available on Netflix Pakistan on 30 January 2020. To mark its third anniversary, ARY Digital aired the film on 21 July 2021, Eid al-Adha day 1.

== Reception ==
=== Box office ===
Teefa in Trouble became the biggest opener for any Pakistani film, collecting Rs. 2.31 crore, breaking the previous record of Rs. 2.07 crore by Jawani Phir Nahi Ani. At the local box office, it became the fifth biggest non-holiday opener. This record was broken by Jawani Phir Nahi Ani 2 soon, collecting Rs. 2.99 crore. It collected under Rs. 2.5 crore on its second day from Pakistan. It became the second Pakistani film to collect above Rs. 7 crore by its first weekend in Pakistan, surpassing the challenge of releasing during a non-holiday and non-peak season. The worldwide collections for the first weekend were approximately Rs. 10.15 crore. It also became the first Pakistani film to collect a high of Rs. 9.86 crore within five days from the local box office and made its worldwide gross of about Rs. 14.26 crore.

On 27 July, it became the highest-grossing Pakistani film of 2018. The nationwide collections till the second week were Rs. 18.79 crore. At the local box office, the film also registered the biggest third weekend and week with Rs. 5.77 crore, the biggest fourth weekend and week with Rs. 4.17 crore, and the biggest fifth weekend and week with Rs. 1.5 crore. It became the 3rd highest grossing Pakistani film behind Punjab Nahi Jaungi and Jawani Phir Nahi Ani, and the first non-holiday film to cross the Rs. 30 crore mark, that too only locally. After collecting Rs. 9.4 crore from the overseas market in 38 days, and Rs. 32.04 crore from the local box office till the eighth weekend, the film made Rs. 41.44 crore. It collected Rs. 33 crore locally after its four-month run. On 20 February 2019, EPK's report stated that it has made Rs. 34.5 crore locally, and Rs. 14 crore from overseas.

It was back to the screens on 22 February in the aftermath of the 2019 Pulwama attack and the tensions among India and Pakistan. On 31 March, it was announced that the film has crossed the Rs. 50 crore mark.

=== Critical response ===
The film premiered on 19 July at Nueplex Cinemas, in DHA, Karachi, and on 20 July at CineStar IMAX Lahore. It opened to positive reviews.

Writing for The Express Tribune, Rahul Aijaz praised the acting, score, and the direction, and said that it "sets new standards for film-making in Pakistan" due to its visuals and action sequences, adding that "a few inadequacies hinder" it "from reaching its full potential". Sahir Palijo called it "quite entertaining" while rating 3 out of 5 stars, and commented that "The first half is very enjoyable and leaves you excited", but "the second half is a drag and doesn't have much to offer." Omair Alavi rated the film 4 out of 5 stars and said that the "magical background score" and "amazing cinematography keeps the audience engaged in the film, making it one of those films that will not bore", however, he too noted that the film duration could have been lowered. For Dawn, Bilal Agha described the film as "splendidly directed" and one that "set the bar high" for Pakistani films. Mohammad Kamran Jawaid wrote in a moderate review, "At times, a movie that doesn't aim that high yet scores on all levels is good enough." Khurram Suhail of Dawn News said that the film has everything except the story, which is a plus as well as the negative for the film; only box office gross can not grow the industry. Sulman Ali of Pakistan Today praised the film and said that it is "simply a fun ride with its quirky and witty dialogues, with the perfect humour showcased by all the actors".

For Geo News, Aizaz Imtiaz commented that it may be an "ordinary story" but "the way it has been shot keeps you hooked till the last scene". Rehan Ahmed reviewed it positively and called it the biggest and most smart film in the revival of Pakistani cinema. Sadiq Saleem of Masala! rated 3 out of 5 stars, and praised the film's production value, stunts and dialogues, but noted the weak plot and drags. Shahjehan Saleem of Something Haute rated it 4 out of 5 stars while calling it "a strong competitor" due to its "stellar cinematography, beautiful music, strong acting skills, and an overall comic persona" while noting that "it lacks from a meatier story". Nayab Fatima of Aaj TV rated 3 out of 5 stars and praised Maya Ali and the film's "quality" for "action scenes", "beautiful locations" and "funny dialogues", while she also noted the weak storyline. Asjad Khan of HIP said that despite "there are some issues with the film", it is "the mass entertainer audiences have been crying out for." UrduMom praised the film, she commented that she was entertained "by the witty lines, music, acting and the beautiful shots."

Farheen Abdullah of Youlin Magazine too praised the film, saying that it "proved to be a great mix of action, comedy, romance, and drama", but she also criticized its length. A critic from Oye Yeah! noted the trouble in the script, but praised the film and commented, "A strong hero, a free-spirited heroine, sharp dialogues, fun and light-hearted comedy, the picture perfect look, song and dance, and powerful fight sequences". BBC Urdu's Hassan Zaidi gave positive reviews to the film and termed it as the most commercial Pakistani film which will help open a new chapter in Pakistan's commercial cinema.

=== Accolades ===
| Ceremony | Won | Nominated |
|---|---|---|
| 18th Lux Style Awards | Ahsan Rahim – Best Director; Ali Zafar – Best Actor (Viewers' choice) | Lightingale Productions – Best Film |
| 5th Galaxy Lollywood Awards | Lightingale Productions – Best Film; Ali Zafar – Best Actor; Ahsan Rahim – Best Director; Nayyar Ejaz – Best Actor in a Negative role; Maya Ali – Best Female Debut; Ali Zafar "Sajna Door" – Best male Singer; Aima Baig "Item Number – Best female Singer; "Item Number" – Song of the Year; Ali Zafar & Shani Arshad – Best Music; Ali Zafar & Maya Ali – Best onscreen couple | Mehmood Aslam – Best Actor in supporting role; Faisal Qureshi – Best Actor in comic role; Ali Zafar – Best male Debut; Ali Zafar "Chan Ve" – or – Ali Zafar & Danyal Zafar "Sajna Door" – Best Lyricist; Feroz Khan "Item Number" – Best Choreographer |
| Jackie Chan Action Movie Awards | | Lightingale Productions – Best Action Film; Ahsan Rahim – Best Action Director; Ali Zafar – Best Action Hero |

== Controversies ==
=== Protests ===
Protests marked the premieres of Teefa in Trouble in Karachi and Lahore by activists who boycotted the film over the sexual harassment allegations against Ali Zafar by Meesha Shafi, which Zafar denied. On 31 March 2026, a sessions court in Lahore ruled in favour of Ali Zafar in his defamation case and ordered Meesha Shafi to pay Rs. 50 lakh in damages.

=== Piracy ===
Teefa in Trouble was largely unauthorized and was available on multiple streaming websites after its release, including YouTube and Facebook. The production team also posted a warning notice and initiated the step against piracy of all Pakistani films.

=== Awards show ===
The nominations for the 2019 Lux Style Awards sparked social media due to Zafar's name in it. Many celebrities called out for either boycotting the awards or rejecting their nominations. Director Ahsan Rahim shared that widely acclaimed film music not being nominated is a disappointment, and asked for the deserving ones. The award show commented to respect the decisions of the jury as well as wait for the legal decision of the harassment case.

== See also ==
- List of Pakistani films of 2018
- Aima Baig discography
