= Huqa Pani =

2003 studio album by Ali Zafar

Huqa Pani (1st Studio Music Album)

Studio album by Ali Zafar
- Released: 21 November 2003
- Genre: Pop
- Length: 46:36
- Labels: Pan Rhythm, Empire Music, Universal Music India

Ali Zafar chronology
Huqa Pani (1st Studio Music Album) (2003)	Masty (2006)

Huqa Pani (Urdu: حقہ پانی) is the first studio album by Pakistani pop singer Ali Zafar. Zafar started his career as a music composer and gained popularity by his successful single "Channo" from his debut album, which earned him several awards for Best Music Album and Artist.

== Track listing ==
No.	Title	Lyrics	Music	Length
1.	"Channo"	Ali Zafar	Ali Zafar	4:40
2.	"Huqa Pani"	Majid, Ali Zafar	Malik, Ali Zafar	4:40
3.	"Chal Dil Mere"	Capt Shamim Ahmed	Saeed	4:15
4.	"Rangeen"	Ali Zafar	Ali Zafar	4:28
5.	"Ek Pal"	Ali Zafar	Ali Zafar	2:32
6.	"Teri Yaad Aayi"	Saeed	Saeed	4:23
7.	"Jugnuon Se Bhar Le Anchal"	Aqeel Ruby	Wajahat Attre	5:21
8.	"Dekha Sung Tere"	Saeed	Asjad	5:25
9.	"Din Doobey"	Saeed	Saeed	5:48
10.	"Ishq"	Ali Zafar	Ali Zafar	5:04
Total length:				46:36

== Personnel ==
- Programmed by Shuja Haider (1)
- Produced by Shaany (2, 3, 4, 9)
- Guitars by Danish (6)
- Violins by Nijat (6)

== Awards ==
- Best Album – 3rd Lux Style Awards

== Featured in other media ==
Ali Zafar, earlier from the release of album, collaborated with Shabnam Majid and sung "Jugnuon Se Bhar De Aanchal" for 2003 film Shararat. He then joined Coke Studio Pakistan, and sung "Rangeen", "Channo" and "Chal Dil Meray" in season 1, 2008. His "Channo" was also featured in an episode of animated TV series Burka Avenger in 2013, and in 2016 film Lahore Se Aagey.

=== Music videos ===
1. "Chal Dil Meray"
2. "Channo"
3. "Rangeen"
4. "Ek Pal"
5. "Jugnuon Se Bhar De Aanchal" (filmi duet)
6. "Rangeen" (Coke Studio)
7. "Channo" (Coke Studio)
8. "Chal Dil Meray" (Coke Studio)

== See also ==
- Ali Zafar discography
