= Coke Studio Pakistan season 1 =

First television season of Coke Studio

Coke Studio Pakistan
- Season 1
- season 1 logo
- Starring: Featured Artists
- No. of episodes: 4

Release
- Original release: February 6 – April 18, 2008

Season chronology
- Next → Season 2

The first season of the Pakistani music television series Coke Studio Pakistan commenced airing on 6 February 2008 and ended on 18 April 2008.

The show was produced by The Coca-Cola Company and Rohail Hyatt. The production team included Rohail Hyatt as the executive producer along with Umber Hyatt and Nofil Naqvi being the producers of the show. Natasha De Souza and Naseer-ud-din Wasif served as production team members.

== Artists ==
Artists featured in the show included, Rahat Fateh Ali Khan, Ali Azmat, Ali Zafar, Ustaad H. B Gullo, Saieen Tufail Ahmed, Ahsan Farooq, Strings, Sajid & Zeeshan, Saba & Selina and Mauj.

=== Featured artists ===
- Ali Azmat
- Ali Zafar
- Mauj
- Ustad Hussain Baksh Gullo
- Rahat Fateh Ali Khan
- Sain Tufail
- Sajid & Zeeshan
- Strings

The show also featured a house band which had some of the high-profile musicians in the country including, Omran Shafique on guitars, Kamran Zafar on bass guitars, Zeeshan Parwez on keyboards and turntables, Louis 'Gumby' Pinto on drums. Other members of the house band included, Saba Shabbir, Athar Sani and Selina Rashid on backing vocals along with Babar Khanna, Zulfiq 'Shazee' Ahmed Khan and The Abdul Latif Band on percussions.

=== Backing vocals ===
- Saba Shabbir
- Selina Rashid

=== House band ===
- Bass: Kamran "Mannu" Zafar
- Coordinator & Flute: Rahat Ali
- DJ and Synthesizers: Zeeshan Parvez
- Drums: Louis "Gumby" Pinto
- Guitars: Omran "Momo" Shafique
- Percussion: The Abdul Latif Band, Babar Khanna & Shaizi

== Episodes ==
The first episode aired on 8 June, followed by the second episode being aired on 29 June. The third episode was aired on all locals channels on 20 July and the show came to an end on 4 August, which also rebroadcast three songs, "Sar Kiye" by Strings, "Garaj Baras" by Ali Azmat featuring Rahat Fateh Ali Khan and "Allah Hu" by Tufail Ahmed and Ali Zafar, from the previous episodes.

No. Overall	#	Song(s) Title	Artist(s)	Language(s)	Original air date
Episode 1
1	1	Deewana	Ali Azmat	Urdu	8 June 2008
1	2	Garaj Baras	Ali Azmat & Rahat Fateh Ali Khan	Urdu	8 June 2008
1	3	Gallan	Ali Azmat	Punjabi	8 June 2008
1	4	Shaman Paiyan	Rahat Fateh Ali Khan	Punjabi	8 June 2008
1	5	Balama	Ali Azmat & Rahat Fateh Ali Khan	Punjabi & Urdu	8 June 2008
1	6	Paheliyan	Mauj		8 June 2008
Episode 2
2	7	I'm in Love (I'm a Believer)	Saba and Selina	English	29 June 2008
2	8	Sar Kiye	Strings	Urdu	29 June 2008
2	9	Anjane	Strings	Urdu	29 June 2008
2	10	Duur	Strings, Hussain Bakhsh Gullo & House Band	Urdu	29 June 2008
2	11	Zinda	Strings	Urdu	29 June 2008
2	12	Jam Session	Hussain Bakhsh Gullo & House Band		29 June 2008
Episode 3
3	13	Janay Na Koi	Ali Zafar		20 July 2008
3	14	Chal Dil Meray	Ali Zafar	Urdu	20 July 2008
3	15	Channo	Ali Zafar	Urdu	20 July 2008
3	16	Rangeen	Ali Zafar	Urdu	20 July 2008
3	17	My Happiness	Sajid & Zeeshan	English	20 July 2008
3	18	Allah Hu	Ali Zafar & Tufail Ahmed	Urdu	20 July 2008
Episode 4
4	19	Percussion Jam	House Band		4 August 2008
4	20	Dildara	Rahat Fateh Ali Khan	Punjabi	4 August 2008
4	21	Flute Jam	Various Artists		4 August 2008
4	22	Mein Challa	Ali Azmat	Punjabi	4 August 2008
4	23	Garaj Baras	Ali Azmat & Rahat Fateh Ali Khan	Urdu	4 August 2008
4	24	Dhaani	Strings & Hussain Baskhsh Gullo	Urdu	4 August 2008
4	25	Sar Kiye	Strings	Urdu	4 August 2008
4	26	Allah Hu	Ali Zafar & Tufail Ahmed	Urdu	4 August 2008
