= Wahab Bugti =

Pakistani folk musician

Wahab Bugti عبدالوہاب بگٹی
- Born: Abdul Wahab Bugti; 1985 or 1986 (age 39–40)
- Origin: Nasirabad, Balochistan, Pakistan
- Genres: Balochi; Pakistani folk
- Occupation(s): Singer, songwriter, instrumentalist
- Instruments: Dambura; singing
- Years active: 2020–present

Abdul Wahab Bugti (Urdu/Balochi: عبدالوہاب بگٹی) is a Pakistani folk musician who performs in Balochi and Urdu. He is known for his use of the dambura, a plucked string instrument used in the folk music of Balochistan.

He rose to prominence with the release of the pop single "Kana Yaari" in season 14 (episode one) of Coke Studio Pakistan, also featuring singer Kaifi Khalil and rapper Eva B, in which Bugti lent both his vocals and lyrics.

== Artistry and career ==
Bugti pens the lyrics to his songs in his native eastern Balochi dialect. His singing is usually accompanied with the use of a dambura, a traditional, long-necked plucked string instrument endemic to Balochi folk music. Bugti had a passion for singing since his childhood, joining a musical academy while in middle school where he was taught by a teacher. He would often accompany his teacher to perform at weddings and other local events in his village and surrounding areas. With the accessibility of internet, he began to upload his work on social media and eventually built his own studio where he would record his renditions of music. His soulfoul rendition of the song "Teri Mitti" from the Hindi film Kesari recorded in 2020 went viral in July 2021.

He was introduced to Coke Studio after being approached by its producer Zulfiqar Jabbar Khan for season 14, where he collaborated with artists Kaifi Khalil and Eva B for the Balochi pop track "Kana Yaari". In the track, which talks about love and betrayal, Bugti contributed his vocals, lyrics and also played the dambura as shown in the music video. The single, released in January 2022, instantly became a hit and catapulted Bugti to fame locally and internationally, gaining millions of hits on platforms such as YouTube and Spotify. The Norwegian hip hop dance group Quick Style also performed to the song, whom Bugti later met and jammed with in October while participating in Coke Studio's concert at Dubai's Coca-Cola Arena.

In November 2022, Bugti performed a folk and contemporary rendition of the Pakistani national anthem onstage with Shehzad Roy at the 21st Lux Style Awards.

== Personal life ==
Bugti hails from the village of Goth Mohammad Umar in Nasirabad District, Balochistan, where he owns livestock and agriculture. Some sources ascribe his name as Wahab Ali Bugti. He is married and has eight children.

In August 2022, Bugti's mud-house and village were swept away in monsoon flooding and he was forced to relocate with his family to the nearby city of Dera Murad Jamali. The news of his displacement during the natural disaster made headlines and he was offered assistance by Balochistan's chief minister, an army rescue team, as well as Coke Studio producer Zulfiqar Jabbar Khan. There was also an outpouring of support for the artist online via crowdsourcing.

== Discography ==
Singles or renditions recorded by Bugti include:

Year	Track	Artist(s)
2020	"Teri Mitti"	Wahab Bugti; original by Arko and B Praak from Kesari (2019)
2021	"Shab-e-Gham Mujh Se Mil Kar"	Wahab Bugti; original by Naheed Akhtar
2021	"Paharon Ki Kasam"	Wahab Bugti ft. Sabz Ali Bugti; original by Shan Khan
2021	"Naara Qalandari"	Mai Dhai, Wahab Bugti, Ahsan Bari and Arman Rahim
2022	"Kana Yaari"	Kaifi Khalil, Eva B and Wahab Bugti
2022	"Qaumi Taranah"	Shehzad Roy, Wahab Bugti
2022	"Dilruba"	Wahab Bugti
2022	"Marshi Ishq Boliya Bolgi"	Wahab Bugti
2023	"Kahani Suno"	Wahab Bugti; original by Kaifi Khalil
2023	"Mera Dil Yeh Pukare Aaja"	Wahab Bugti; original by Hemant Kumar and Lata Mangeshkar from Nagin (1954)
2023	"Dil Darya"	Wahab Bugti
