= Coke Studio Pakistan season 14 =

Fourteenth television season of Coke Studio Pakistan

Coke Studio Pakistan
- Season 14
- Starring: Vocalists

Release
- Original network: YouTube
- Original release: 14 January – 22 March 2022

Season chronology
- ← Previous; Season 13 Next → Season 15

The fourteenth season of the Pakistani music television series Coke Studio Pakistan was produced by Zulfiqar Jabbar Khan (popularly known as Xulfi) after Rohail Hyatt stepped down from the role. Coca-Cola Pakistan was the executive producer of the show. Season 14 featured 13 original songs, each with its own visuals, and ran from 14 January 2022 to 22 March 2022.

== Artists ==
=== Vocalists ===
The lineup caters to both the older generation and the younger generation alike, offering the voices of the veterans as well as the Generation Z.

- Abdullah Siddiqui
- Abida Parveen
- Ali Sethi
- Arooj Aftab
- Asfar Hussain
- Atif Aslam
- Butt Brothers
- Eva B
- Faisal Kapadia
- Faris Shafi
- Hasan Raheem
- Justin Bibis
- Kaifi Khalil
- Karakoram
- Meesha Shafi
- Momina Mustehsan
- Naseebo Lal
- Quratulain Balouch
- Shae Gill
- Soch
- Talal Qureshi
- Talha Anjum
- Wahab Bugti
- Young Stunners
- Zain Zohaib Qawwals

=== Musicians ===
- Action Zain
- Annan Noukhez
- Arsalan Hasan
- Asad Ali
- Asif Ali
- Awais Kazmi
- Aziz Kazi
- Bilawal Lahooti
- David Joseph
- Faiz Qazi
- Gul Muhammad
- Haider Abbas
- Haider Ali
- Haroon Daniel
- Javed Iqbal
- Joshua Amjad
- Kami Paul
- Mairah Khan
- Melvin Arthur
- Muzammil Hussain
- Nijat Ali
- Omair Farooq
- Payam Mashrequi
- Rohail Nawab
- Saad ul Hasan
- Sherry Khattak
- Turaab Khan
- Veeru Shan
- Waqas Hussain
- Yusuf Ramay
- Zain Peerzada
- Zyad Ahmed Tariq

=== Art director ===
- Hashim Ali

== Production ==
The revamp of season 14 celebrated the connection between music, aesthetics, and attitude. Instead of following an episodic format, the season featured individual songs, each with its own unique video directed by some of Pakistan's most innovative directors, such as Jamal Rahman, Kamal Khan, Murtaza Niaz, and Zeeshan Parwez. Spotify was the official music streaming partner of Season 14.

Xulfi was the producer of season 14, under his production company Giraffe Pakistan, and Abdullah Siddiqui, Action Zain, Adnan Dhool and Sherry Khattak served as the associate music producers. Speaking at the launch of Coke Studio Season 14, Xulfi said,

Artistic, talented, progressive – if we get our powers together, we are amazing. For me, Coke Studio can open peoples’ hearts to Pakistan.

— Xulfi, producer #CokeStudio14

The season was distributed by Coca-Cola Pakistan. Vice president Coca-Cola Pakistan & Afghanistan Fahad Ashraf said:

The Coke Studio platform has evolved this season. Whereas the values are the same but we are now leaning into the future by including the GenZ sound very deliberately. It is about time that we sync our cords with what the youngsters what. Nostalgia has its place in Season 14 but so does the firepower of a sound never been heard before.

— Fahad Ashraf, Vice president Coca-Cola Pakistan & Afghanistan

Spotify Pakistan was the digital streaming partner for Coke Studio Season 14.

Khan FM, artists and label partners for Pakistan, Sri Lanka and Bangladesh at Spotify said:

We are extremely excited to be a partner on the journey of Coke Studio Pakistan’s latest season. Coke Studio is a household name across Pakistan and has cultivated a love for different genres at a regional level year after year. As their official music streaming partner, we look forward to creating a memorable and enhanced listening experience for our Pakistani and South Asian listeners as they browse through our collaborative destination.

— Khan FM, Artist & Label Partner, Spotify

== Songs ==
The season consisted of 13 original songs, with all of them produced by Xulfi.

No. overall	No. in season	Song Title	Artist(s)	Composer(s)	Lyricist(s)	Original release date
Season Opener
79	1	"Shuru Karein"	Rovalio	Rovalio	-	January 9, 2022
Shuru Karein is an instrumental track composed and arranged by Rovalio. The mixing was done by Xulfi, and the final audio was mastered by Chris Athens.
80	2	"Tu Jhoom"	Abida Parveen & Naseebo Lal	Xulfi	Adnan Dhool	January 14, 2022
Tu Jhoom is a Punjabi-language song featuring vocals by renowned artists Abida Parveen and Naseebo Lal. The song's lyrics were penned by Adnan Dhool, while the music was composed by Xulfi. Xulfi collaborated with Abdullah Siddiqui on music arrangement and production, and handled the mixing himself. The instrumental accompaniment includes Asif Ali on tabla, Haroon Daniel on octapad, Melvin Arthur on bass, Payam Mashrequi on synthesizer, Rohail Nawab on acoustic guitar, Saad-ul-Hassan on synthesizer and backing vocals, Syed Awais Kazmi on mountain dulcimer, and Yusuf Ramay on drums.
Episode 1
81	3	"Kana Yaari"	Kaifi Khalil, Eva B & Abdul Wahab Bugti	Kaifi Khalil	Kaifi Khalil, Eva B & Abdul Wahab Bugti	January 19, 2022
Kana Yaari is a Balochi song featuring a narrative developed by Kaifi Khalil and Eva B, with lyrics penned by the duo alongside Wahab Bugti. Kaifi Khalil also composed the music, while Xulfi, Abdullah Siddiqui, Arsalan Hasan, and Sherry Khattak collaborated on the arrangement and production. The song showcases vocals by Kaifi Khalil, Eva B, and Wahab Bugti, with Wahab Bugti also playing the Damboora. Completing the instrumentation are Ameer Buksh on Damboora, Arsalan Hassan on keys, Kami Paul on drums, Mairah Khan on Balalaika, Payam Mashrequi on synthesizer, Omair Farooq on synth bass, Haroon Daniel on Octapad, and Veeru Shan on percussion.
82	4	"Sajan Das Na"	Atif Aslam & Momina Mustehsan	Abdullah Siddiqui, Adnan Dhool, Momina Mustehsan & Xulfi	Adnan Dhool & Momina Mustehsan	January 23, 2022
Sajan Das Na is a Punjabi song with a narrative crafted by Adnan Dhool, Xulfi, and Momina Mustehsan. Mustehsan also contributed additional lyrics to the song, written by Dhool. The music itself was composed collaboratively by Abdullah Siddiqui, Adnan Dhool, Momina Mustehsan, and Xulfi. Xulfi handled both the mixing and co-production of the music alongside Abdullah Siddiqui. Finally, the song features vocals by Atif Aslam and Momina Mustehsan, accompanied by instrumentalists including Bilawal Lahooti on drums, Melvin Arthur on synth bass, and Haroon Daniel on the octapad.
83	5	"Mehram"	Asfar Hussain & Arooj Aftab	Asfar Hussain & Xulfi	Asfar Hussain & Xulfi	January 28, 2022
Mehram is an Urdu song featuring a narrative crafted by Asfar Hussain and Xulfi. The music was composed by Asfar Hussain & Xulfi and the lyrics were written by Asfar Hussain with additional lyrics by Xulfi. Abdullah Siddiqui, Xulfi & Arooj Aftab collaborated on the arrangement and production of the music, while Xulfi handled the mixing. The song features vocals by Asfar Hussain and Arooj Aftab, along with a variety of instrumentalists including Haroon Daniel on drums, Payam Mashrequi on synth/linnstrument, Melvin Arthur on electric guitar, Asad Haider Khan on synth bass, David Joseph on cello, Rohail Nawab on acoustic guitar, Faiz Qazi on harp, Asad Ali on piano, and Shahzad Ismaily on guitar and synth.
Episode 2
84	6	"Neray Neray Vas"	Soch & Butt Brothers	Soch & Butt Brothers	Adnan Dhool & Butt Brothers	February 1, 2022
Neray Neray Vas is a Punjabi song with a narrative developed by Adnan Dhool. The composition is a collaborative effort between Soch (Adnan Dhool & Rabi Ahmed) and Butt Brothers (Shamroz Butt & Umair Butt), who also co-wrote the lyrics alongside Dhool. Action Zain and Xulfi worked together on the song's arrangement and production, while Xulfi handled the mixing. The song features vocals by Adnan Dhool, Rabi Ahmed, Shamroz Butt, and Umair Butt. Instrumental accompaniment includes Action Zain on synthesizer, Bilawal Lahooti on drums, Saad-ul-Hassan on synthesizer and triggers, Melvin Arthur on synth bass, Veeru Shan on percussions and chimta, Asif Ali on dholak, Asad Ali on harmonium, and Haider Ali on tumbi.
85	7	"Pasoori"	Ali Sethi & Shae Gill	Ali Sethi & Xulfi	Ali Sethi & Fazal Abbas	February 6, 2022
Pasoori is a bilingual Punjabi and Urdu song with a narrative by Ali Sethi. Sethi co-wrote the lyrics with Fazal Abbas and composed the music alongside Xulfi. Abdullah Siddiqui and Sherry Khattak arranged the music, while Siddiqui and Xulfi co-produced it. Xulfi handled the mixing. The song features vocals by Ali Sethi and Shae Gill, alongside instrumental contributions from Kami Paul on electronic drums, Haider Ali on synths and backing vocals, Melvin Arthur on synth bass, Syed Awais Kazmi on acoustic guitar, Payam Mashrequi on synths, Arsalan Hassan on mallet station and backing vocals, Haider Ali on baglama and mandolin, and Aaron Paul on octapad. The performance also incorporates a classical dance by Sheema Kermani.
86	8	"Ye Dunya"	Karakoram, Talha Anjum, Faris Shafi	Sherry Khattak & Xulfi	Adnan Dhool, Talha Anjum, Faris Shafi, Xulfi	February 12, 2022
Ye Dunya is a bilingual Urdu and English song. The song's narrative was developed collaboratively by Adnan Dhool, Xulfi, Talha Anjum, and Sherry Khattak. Credits for songwriting are shared between Adnan Dhool, Talha Anjum, Faris Shafi, and the renowned poet Zulfiqar Jabbar Khan. Sherry Khattak and Xulfi composed the music. The song's arrangement and production were a joint effort by Xulfi and Sherry Khattak, with Xulfi handling the mixing. The song features Sherry Khattak, Talha Anjum, and Faris Shafi on vocals. The band includes Anaan Naukhez and Zain Peerzada on electric guitars, Omair Farooq on bass, Bilawal Lahooti on drums, Haroon Daniel on octapad, Saad ul Hassan on keys and synths, and Payam Mashrequi on a variety of instruments including synths, malletstation, and linnstrument.
Episode 3
87	9	"Peechay Hutt"	Hasan Raheem, Justin Bibis, Talal Qureshi	Hassan Raheem, Talal Qureshi & Xulfi	Hasan Raheem & Talal Qureshi	February 19, 2022
Peechay Hutt is a multilingual song featuring English, Urdu, and Shina. The song's narrative was created by Hasan Raheem and Xulfi, with lyrics penned by Raheem and the catchy hook written by Talal Qureshi. Raheem, Qureshi, and Xulfi collaborated on the composition. Talal Qureshi and Xulfi handled both music arrangement and production, while Xulfi mixed the final track. Vocalist duties are shared by Hasan Raheem, Muqadar Tabeydar, and Sania Sohail. The song is further enriched by a variety of instrumentalists including Syed Awais Kazmi on acoustic guitar, Veeru Shan on percussion instruments, Aziz Kazi on traditional percussion, Bilawal Lahooti on electronic drums, and a keyboard section featuring Melvin Arthur, Payam Mashrequi, and Haroon Daniel.
88	10	"Muaziz Saarif"	Faris Shafi & Meesha Shafi	Meesha Shafi, Faris Shafi & Xulfi	Faris Shafi & Meesha Shafi	February 27, 2022
Muaziz Saarif is a bilingual Urdu and Punjabi song. The Shafi siblings, Faris and Meesha, created both the narrative and lyrics for the song. The music itself was a collaborative effort between the siblings and Xulfi, with Action Zain and Abdullah Siddiqui handling the arrangement. Production duties were shared between Action Zain, Abdullah Siddiqui, and Xulfi, who also mixed the final track. The song features Meesha and Faris Shafi on vocals, accompanied by a band featuring Action Zain and Zyad Ahmed on synthesizers, Melvin Arthur on synth bass, Haroon Daniel on octapad, Joshua Amjad on tabla, and Yusuf Ramay on electric drums.
89	11	"Beparwah"	Momina Mustehsan	Adnan Dhool & Rabi Ahmed	Adnan Dhool, Momina Mustehsan & Xulfi	March 7, 2022
Beparwah is a Punjabi and Urdu song. The song's narrative was developed by Adnan Dhool and Xulfi, while the music itself was composed by the songwriting duo Soch, consisting of Adnan Dhool and Rabi Ahmed. Adnan Dhool wrote the primary lyrics, with additional contributions by Momina Mustehsan and Xulfi. Xulfi and Action Zain collaborated on both music arrangement and production, and Xulfi mixed the final track. Momina Mustehsan lends her vocals to the song, accompanied by a band featuring Action Zain on synthesizers, Muzamil Hussain on sarod, Veeru on percussion and mallet instruments, Asad Ali on harmonium, Melvin Arthur on synth bass, Haroon Daniel on octapad, Saad ul Hassan on additional synthesizers, and Yusuf Ramay on drums.
Episode 4
90	12	"Thagyan"	Quratulain Baloch, Zain & Zohaib	Action Zain & Xulfi	Zohaib Ali, Zain Ali & Asim Raza	March 13, 2022
Thagyan is a Punjabi song featuring vocals by Zain Ali, Zohaib Ali, and Quratulain Balouch. The song's narrative was written by Zain Zohaib, while the music was composed by Action Zain and Xulfi. Zohaib Ali, Zain Ali, and Asim Raza collaborated on the lyrics. Action Zain and Xulfi also handled the music arrangement and production, with the final mixing being done by Xulfi. The instrumental aspect of the song includes synth and keyboard played by Action Zain and Saad ul Hassan, tumbi and banjo by Haider Ali, synth bass by Melvin Arthur, octapad by Haroon Daniel, drums by Kami Paul, tabla by Abdul Waheed, harmonium by Sameer Ali, and dholak by Ghula Abbas. The song also featured backing vocals by Ehsan Ali, Nauman Rehmat, Mudassar Ali, and Ruzzam Ali.
91	13	"Go"	Abdullah Siddiqui & Atif Aslam	Abdullah Siddiqui, Maanu & Atif Aslam	Abdullah Siddiqui, Maanu, Xulfi	March 18, 2022
Go is a bilingual song in English and Urdu. Abdullah Siddiqui crafted the song's narrative, while the composition itself was a joint effort between Siddiqui, Maanu, and Atif Aslam. Siddiqui also wrote the lyrics, collaborating with Maanu and Xulfi. Taking sole responsibility for the music arrangement, Siddiqui partnered with Xulfi on production. Xulfi mixed the final track. The song features Abdullah Siddiqui and Atif Aslam sharing vocal duties. A traditional and contemporary instrumentation accompanies the vocals, including Asif Ali on tabla, Gul Muhammad on sarangi, Waqas Hussain on sitar, David Joseph on cello and violin, Melvin Arthur on synth bass, Payam Mashrequi on linndrum and synthesizer, Haroon Daniel on octapad, Saad-ul-Hassan on synthesizers and keyboards, and Bilawal Lahooti on electric drums.
92	14	"Phir Milenge"	Faisal Kapadia & Young Stunners	Xulfi	Adnan Dhool, Talha Anjum, Talhah Yunus, Xulfi	March 22, 2022
Phir Milenge is an Urdu song with a narrative developed by Xulfi and Adnan Dhool. Xulfi composed the music, while the lyrics were written collaboratively by Adnan Dhool, Talha Anjum, and Talha Yunus, with additional contributions by Xulfi. Both music arrangement and production were handled by Xulfi and Abdullah Siddiqui, and Xulfi mixed the final track. The song features vocals by Faisal Kapadia, Talha Anjum, and Talha Yunus, accompanied by a band consisting of Melvin Arthur on synth bass, Asad Ali on piano, Payam Mashrequi on synthesizers, Haroon Daniel on octapad, Saad-ul-Hassan on synthesizer, and Yusuf Ramay on drums.

== Controversy ==
An up-and-coming artist from Umerkot, Nirmala Maghani, accused Xulfi of plagiarism in melody of "Tu Jhoom" without crediting her, from a sample which she sent him as an audition in June 2021 and he had not replied. On the other hand, Xulfi and Coke Studio denied, claiming the song was in making since May 2021. However, seniors like Yousuf Salahuddin, Salman Ahmad and musician Beena Raza came in to support Maghani, who said she would take this matter to court. On 24 January 2022, her lawyer, Faraz Faheem Siddiqui, sent a legal notice to Xulfi to give her credit, otherwise a suit of Rs. 10 crore will be charged.
