= Coke Studio Nu.WAV =

Pakistani music platform

- Logo
- کوک اسٹوڈیو نیو ویو
- Country of origin: Pakistan

Production
- Executive producer: Kamal Khan

Original release
- Release: 3 September – 12 November 2026

Related
- Coke Studio Pakistan

Coke Studio Nu.WAV is a Pakistani music platform launched by The Coca-Cola Company within the wider Coke Studio Pakistan ecosystem. It was announced in August 2026 and is executive produced by filmmaker Kamal Khan. Unlike the main Coke Studio series, Nu.WAV is a distinct platform that gives artists and producers greater creative freedom. Coca-Cola has stated that it is not a new season of Coke Studio Pakistan and is not intended to replace the main series.

The platform's inaugural release series comprised six songs, released individually between 3 September and 12 November 2026. The series concluded with "Diwanay Dil", featuring Young Stunners, Sabaat Batin and Jokhay.

== Background ==
Coke Studio Nu.WAV was announced by Coca-Cola Pakistan in August 2026 as a new chapter within the Coke Studio ecosystem, following fifteen seasons and nearly 350 musical releases of Coke Studio Pakistan. The platform was presented as a response to changes in how contemporary musicians create and release music, while continuing Coke Studio's role in introducing emerging artists and connecting different musical traditions and generations in Pakistan.

== Concept ==
Nu.WAV moves away from the traditional single-producer format of the main series. Artists are paired with producers of their choice and are given greater freedom to develop their own sounds and creative identities. The platform also brings together contributors from music, film, design and visual storytelling, with each project shaped according to the creative approach of its collaborators.

The platform features both emerging and established artists, including musicians who have gained recognition through independent releases, live performances and social media.

Kamal Khan described Nu.WAV as reflecting the way contemporary musicians work through laptops, home studios and individual production environments. As executive producer, he said his role was to bring different creators together while allowing them to develop their own musical approaches.

== Nu.WAV Portal ==
The Nu.WAV Portal was introduced as an open submission platform through which emerging creators could submit work for consideration. Submissions were accepted across categories including singing, dancing and other creative disciplines.

The portal received thousands of entries from across Pakistan. The submissions were reviewed and shortlisted as part of the process of identifying emerging talent for the platform. Aaryan SDQ was among the artists selected through the initiative and subsequently became part of the inaugural edition's lineup.

The inaugural edition concluded in November 2026 after the release of six songs, providing a platform for established performers and emerging artists to collaborate and introduce new musical work.

== Artists ==
=== Vocalists ===
- Afusic
- Asim Azhar
- Hasan Raheem
- Izz Chughtai
- Maanu
- Shae Gill
- Sabaat Batin
- Young Stunners
- Zoha Waseem
- AARYAN

=== Producers ===
- Ali Soomro
- Talal Qureshi
- Umair
- Abdullah Kasumbi
- Jokhay
- Rovalio

== Songs ==
The inaugural Nu.WAV consists of six songs, which are being released individually.

Song	Artists	Producer	Composer	Lyricist	Release date
"Dil"	Afusic and Zoha Waseem	Ali Soomro	Afusic and Ali Raza	Afusic and Ali Raza	3 September 2026
Dil explores love, loyalty, separation and the reassurance between two partners. Afusic wrote his part about his wife, drawing on the challenges of maintaining a relationship while travelling and being away from one's partner, while Ali Raza wrote and composed Zoha Waseem's section from a female perspective as a response to Afusic's more uncertain and vulnerable verses. The song was initially not selected for Nu.WAV before being pitched to Coke Studio after Afusic developed his melodies over a beat produced by Ali Soomro. Its lyrics use a consistent radeef and qafiya framework, with the word janeman recurring at the end of lines. The song was originally recorded two scales lower and subsequently raised to suit Waseem's vocal range.
"Rangeen"	Hasan Raheem, Izz Chughtai and Umair	Umair	Umair	Hasan Raheem	17 September 2026
Rangeen is a love song whose gloomy lyrics contrast with a cheerful, danceable beat and overall vibrant sound. Hasan Raheem and Umair developed the song's initial topline and composition before Izz Chughtai was brought in to contribute a different vocal style. The lyrics and composition were subsequently rearranged collaboratively, with a section adapted into Punjabi while retaining Urdu in other parts of the song. The song centres on longing, infatuation and intense devotion, and features a shehnai in its outro.
"Maheya"	Asim Azhar, AARYAN and Rovalio	Rovalio	Asim Azhar, Azhar Hussain and Rovalio	Asim Azhar, AARYAN and Kumail Abbas	1 October 2026
Maheya explores longing for a lost love or a meaningful part of one's life, and the realization of its value only after it is gone; its subject is not limited to romantic love. Asim Azhar drew inspiration from missing home while touring and memories of his father, incorporating a melody he remembered his father singing around two decades earlier. Rovalio had developed the instrumental around a musical idea he had held for some time, and Azhar, AARYAN and Rovalio shaped the track through collaborative sessions. Azhar and AARYAN also worked together on the lyrics, which combine Urdu and English and reflect on absence, emotional helplessness and the difficulty of expressing one's feelings. AARYAN joined the project after submitting a cover through Nu.WAV's artist-submission initiative.
"Shabnam"	Maanu, Zoha Waseem and Talal Qureshi	Talal Qureshi	Maanu	Maanu and Zoha Waseem	15 October 2026
Shabnam explores a fleeting form of love, likened by Maanu to dew that appears at night and disappears by morning. Described as a moody song rather than a conventional love song, it presents an exchange between two contrasting perspectives: Maanu's lyrics express longing, emotional exhaustion and the decision to move on, while Zoha Waseem's verse responds with defiance rather than reciprocating his advances. Maanu and Talal Qureshi, who had collaborated since 2019, developed several demos for the project before selecting a composition Qureshi had created earlier. Waseem was chosen for her vocal versatility and contributed a confident, assertive perspective to the song. The lyrics were refined collaboratively during studio sessions, with the artists experimenting with wording and expressions to convey the song's playful yet melancholic tone.
"Qasam"	Shae Gill and Afusic	Abdullah Kasumbi	Afusic and Abdullah Kasumbi	Afusic	29 October 2026
Qasam explores the emotional complexities of a relationship marked by hurt, attachment and the desire for reconciliation. Written by Afusic, the song originated during an informal session with producer Abdullah Kasumbi, who experimented with royalty-free beats on YouTube with Afusic before developing the melody together. Afusic drew on the emotions of confronting a loved one and expressing personal pain when writing the lyrics, while Shae Gill joined the project to record her vocals after the song had been developed. The composition was adjusted from G-sharp minor to A minor to accommodate the singers' vocal ranges and incorporates traditional instrumentation, including the sarangi, alongside contemporary electronic production. The music video, directed by Kasumbi, portrays two couples from different generations navigating the highs and lows of their relationships through dance and movement. Its visual narrative draws on the Sufi symbolism of a moth attracted to a flame, inspired by discussions of Rumi's poetry and the concept of fana (self-annihilation), representing spiritual longing and the search for connection. Filmed at Karachi's Bristol Hotel, the video uses contrasting lighting, choreography and set design to reflect the song's emotional tension, ultimately ending on a hopeful note.
"Diwanay Dil"	Young Stunners, Sabaat Batin and Jokhay	Jokhay	Talha Anjum, Talhah Yunus, Sabaat Batin and Jokhay	Talha Anjum, Talhah Yunus and Sabaat Batin	12 November 2026
Diwanay Dil explores themes of loyalty, trust, personal struggles and the harsh realities of everyday life through an energetic musical approach rather than a conventional heartbreak narrative. The track was produced by Jokhay, who developed its instrumental from a rhythmic loop and guitar chord progression. Initially conceived as a demo, the composition was presented to Talha Anjum and Talhah Yunus, who responded positively to it, before Sabaat Batin joined the collaboration as an emerging artist for the project. The lyrics were developed by Talha Anjum, Talhah Yunus and Sabaat Batin, with the latter bringing his own writing style and perspective to the song. The music video draws inspiration from Karachi's street life, depicting traffic congestion, everyday altercations and social issues through satire and comedy. Directed by Talhah Yunus and Wali Baloch, the video features scenes beneath Karachi's Lilly Bridge and transitions to a film set, blending everyday urban life with theatrical and surreal elements. The project also reflects Coke Studio Nu.WAV's emphasis on creative independence and providing emerging artists with opportunities to develop their own musical and visual identities.

== See also ==
- Coke Studio Pakistan
- Coke Studio Explorer
- Coke Studio Bangla
- Coke Studio Bharat
