= Coke Studio Pakistan season 15 =

2024 television season

Coke Studio Pakistan
- Season 15
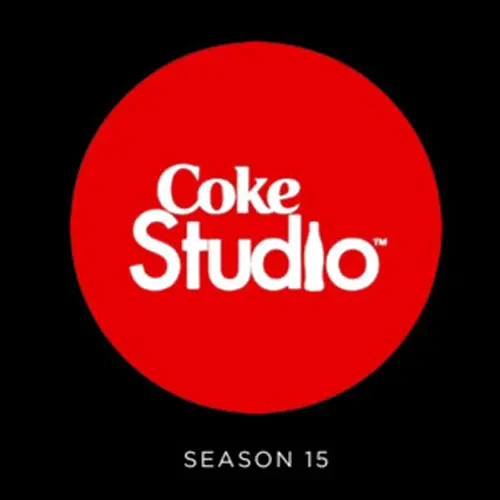
- Starring: Vocalists
- No. of episodes: 11

Release
- Original network: Geo Network; YouTube
- Original release: April 14 – July 4, 2024

Season chronology
- ← Previous; Season 14

The fifteenth season of the Pakistani music television series Coke Studio Pakistan aired from 14 April to 4 July 2024 and was produced and curated by Xulfi. Maintaining the format of the previous season, this season featured 11 original compositions released as individual singles, each accompanied by a dedicated music video.

== Artists ==
=== Vocalists ===
- Abdul Hanan
- Annural Khalid
- Amanda Delara
- Babar Mangi
- Farheen Raza Jaffry
- Faris Shafi
- Gharvi Group (Abida, Rooha Rawal, Saba Hassan & Sajida Bibi)
- Hasan Raheem
- Kaavish (Jaffer Zaidi & Maaz Maudood)
- Kaifi Khalil
- Karpe
- Marvi Saiban
- Maanu
- Nizam Torwali
- Noman Ali Rajper
- Noorima Rehan
- REHMA
- Rozeo
- Sabri Sisters (Anamta Sabri & Saman Sabri)
- Shazia Manzoor
- Sajjad Ali
- Star Shah
- Umair Butt
- Zahoor
- Zeb Bangash
- Zeeshan Ali (musician)

=== Musicians ===
- Acoustic Guitar: Maaz Maudood & Syed Awais Kazmi
- Banjo: Amir Azhar
- Banjo Dulcimer, Charango & Cuatro: Muzammil Hussain
- Chung & Khartal: Lutaf Ali
- Dholak: Joshua Amjad
- Drums: Ahad Nayani, Daud Ramay, Gumby & Yusuf Ramay
- Electric Guitar: Asteria & Awais Kazmi
- Flute: Haider Abbas (Dawood)
- Khol: Sagar Veljee
- Mandolin, Persian Taar & Tumbi: Haider Ali
- Mallet Station: Shehzad Hunzai
- Percussions: Aziz Kazi, Joshua Amjad, Shehzad Hunzai & Veeru Shan
- Shehnai: Attaullah
- Synth: Ali Raza, Haider Ali & Payam Mashrequi
- Synth Bass: Ali Raza, Melvin Arthur, Waleed Attique & Zyad Ahmed
- Tumbi: Muzammil Hussain

== Production ==
In January 2024, Warner Music Group announced a partnership with Giraffe Pakistan. This agreement granted Warner Music South Asia, a part of Warner Music Group, exclusive rights to distribute music produced for Season 15 of Coke Studio Pakistan. Despite this collaboration, Giraffe Pakistan, led by music producer Xulfi, remained the sole producer for Season 15, which premiered on 14 April 2024. O Dimension, with Moiz Qazi as Producer and Amna Maqbool as Associate Producer, undertook production of the Behind the Scenes videos. Geo Network secured the exclusive media rights for the season. Additionally, Spotify continued its role as the official music streaming partner, while TikTok served as the designated entertainment partner.

In a press release, Coke Studio Pakistan emphasized the collaborative nature of the season, describing it as a narrative woven with artistry and collegiality. A team of directors was appointed to helm the music videos for each original song. These directors included established figures such as Zeeshan Parwez and Kamal Khan, alongside Awais Gohar, Murtaza Niaz, Jamal Rahman, and Luke Azariah. During the season launch, Xulfi said:

This season celebrates the enduring power of art, the power of music – the power of love, of warmth and of connection. Each story and world is built on Pakistan’s rich and diverse tapestry: both its heritage and future, fostering a sense of shared identity.

== Songs ==
No. overall	No. in season	Song Title	Artist(s)	Composer(s)	Lyricist(s)	Original release date
Episode 1
93	1	"Aayi Aayi"	Noman Ali Rajper, Babar Mangi & Marvi Saiban	Abdullah Siddiqui, Babar Mangi, Noman Ali Rajper & Xulfi	Babar Mangi & Noman Ali Rajper	April 14, 2024
The Sindhi song "Aayi Aayi," inspired by the folktale of Umar Marvi, features vocals by Noman Ali Rajper, Babar Mangi, and Marvi-Saiban. Xulfi mixed the track, with Randy Merrill handling mastering. Saif Samejo and Zeeshan Ali (musician) provided consultation. The video, directed and shot by Awais Gohar, boasts art direction by Sara Vohra, set design by Hashim Ali Design Studios, and costume design by Fatima Butt. Salman Roofi and Nadeem supported with wardrobe. Fariha Afzal and Areeba Naveed served as assistant directors, along with the art team of Zain Yar Jung and Raheel.
94	2	"2AM"	Star Shah & Zeeshan Ali (musician)	Star Shah, Zeeshan Ali (musician) & Xulfi	Star Shah, Sarfaraz Safi & Zeeshan Ali (musician)	April 21, 2024
"2AM" is a Punjabi song featuring Star Shah and Zeeshan Ali on vocals. The song's narrative and composition involved Star Shah, Zeeshan Ali (musician), and Xulfi, while Star Shah, Sarfaraz Safi, and Zeeshan Ali worked on the lyrics. Aksel Carlson, Thomas, and Xulfi arranged and produced the music, with additional arrangement by Zyad Tariq. Xulfi mixed the song, and Mike Bozzi mastered it. Awais Gohar directed the music video, featuring cinematography by Aamir Mughal, production design by Hashim Ali Choudhry, costume design and styling by Fatima Butt, wardrobe by Salman Roofi and Nadeem, and storyboarding by Nakshab Rahman.
95	3	"Maghron La"	Sabri Sisters & Rozeo	Adnan Dhool, Rozeo & Xulfi	Adnan Dhool, Rozeo & Xulfi	April 28, 2024
The Punjabi song "Maghron La" features the vocals of the Sabri Sisters and Rozeo. Adnan Dhool and Xulfi crafted the song's narrative, while also co-writing and composing the music alongside Rozeo. Rabi Ahmed consulted on the song, while Xulfi mixed it and Stuart Hawkes mastered the audio. A music video accompanies the release, directed by Murtaza Niaz with cinematography by Aamir Mughal. Quick Style choreographed and directed the movement, while Hashim Ali served in dual roles as production designer and art director. Fatima Butt designed and styled the costumes.
Episode 2
96	4	"Harkalay"	REHMA & Zahoor	Curly Ney, Rehma, Xulfi & Zahoor	Abdullah Siddiqui, Hidayat Marwat, Rehma & Zahoor	May 5, 2024
97	5	"O Yaara"	Abdul Hannan & Kaavish	Abdul Hannan & Jaffer Zaidi	Abdul Hannan & Jaffer Zaidi	May 12, 2024
98	6	"Chal Chaliye"	Farheen Raza Jaffry & Sajjad Ali	Sajjad Ali, Shabi Ali & Xulfi	Sajjad Ali & Xulfi	May 19, 2024
Episode 3
99	7	"Blockbuster"	Faris Shafi, Umair Butt & Gharwi Group	Faris Shafi, Shamroz Butt, Umair Butt & Xulfi	Faris Shafi, Shamroz Butt, Umair Butt & Xulfi	May 25, 2024
100	8	"Jhol"	Annural Khalid & Maanu	Maanu & Xulfi	Annural Khalid, Maanu, Wajeeha Badar & Xulfi	June 14, 2024
101	9	"Turri Jandi"	Shazia Manzoor & Hasan Raheem	Xulfi, Abdullah Siddiqui & Hasan Raheem	Adnan Dhool, Hasan Raheem & Xulfi	June 21, 2024
Episode 4
102	10	"Piya Piya Calling"	Kaifi Khalil, Karpe & Amanda Delara	Karpe (Chirag, Magdi), Kaifi Khalil, Kaleb Isaac Ghebreiesus, Amanda Delara, Eirik Kiil Saga, Thomas Meyer Kongshavn & Aksel Carlson	Karpe (Chirag, Magdi) & Kaifi Khalil; Additional Lyrics: Xulfi, Siddharth Amit Bhavsar & Manan Desai	June 28, 2024
103	11	"Mehman"	Zeb Bangash, Noorima Rehan & Nizam Torwali	Xulfi, Zeb Bangash & Abdullah Siddiqui	Xulfi, Zeb Bangash & Asfar Hussain	July 4, 2024

=== Remix ===
No. overall	Song(s) Title	Artist(s)	Lyricist(s)	Audio Producer	Original release date
1	"2AM Lofi Remix"	Star Shah & Zeeshan Ali	Star Shah, Sarfaraz Safi & Zeeshan Ali	Trosk	May 24, 2024
2	"O Yaara Lofi Remix"	Abdul Hannan & Kaavish	Abdul Hannan & Jaffer Zaidi	Trosk	June 9, 2024
3	"Maghron La Remix"	Sabri Sisters & Rozeo	Adnan Dhool, Rozeo & Xulfi	MEMBA	June 14, 2024

== Reception ==
In the wake of the Gaza war, Coca-Cola, the sponsor of the Coke Studio franchise, faced calls for a boycott. This movement gained significant traction in Pakistan, where there was a surge in support for domestic brands, leading to a significant decline in viewership compared to previous seasons. During the boycott campaign, Rohail Hyatt, the former producer of Coke Studio Pakistan's distanced himself from the current season. In a Facebook statement, he clarified his separation from the platform, brand, and show in response to calls for his disassociation. The platform itself did not issue a public statement regarding the boycott or the decline in viewership.

The season was generally considered a letdown by critics and audiences alike. The platform's shift to a music video format and a revised release schedule, implemented last season, sparked discussions about potential compromises between visual aesthetics and the core musical experience, resulting in a season that was easily forgotten. A critic in Dawn, Pakistan's largest English newspaper, described Coke Studio 15 as a "good-looking disappointment." Indian news portal ThePrint also noted that only a few people were loving Season 15. The Express Tribune, observed that some music videos, while complementing the songs, occasionally evoked an advertising aesthetic, prompting questions about their ultimate purpose and efficacy. This critique highlighted the ongoing debate about the interplay between visual elements and their impact on the musical experience. Maheen Sabeeh, writing for The News International, remarked that "this was a season that made you wonder if Coke Studio should call it a day and the platform needed to reevaluate its direction to regain its former glory."

== See also ==
- Coke Studio Bharat
- Coke Studio Tamil
- Coke Studio Bangla season 3
