= Kaifi Khalil =

Pakistani singer (born 1996)

- Born: 2 September 1996 (age 30); Karachi, Sindh, Pakistan
- Occupations: Singer-songwriter; Composer
- Years active: 2016–present
- Known for: Kahani Suno 2.0

Kaifi Khalil (Urdu: کیفی خلیل; born 2 September 1996) is a Pakistani singer-songwriter and composer based in Karachi. He rose to prominence in 2022 after his debut in Coke Studio's Balochi song "Kana Yaari". His song "Kahani Suno 2.0" topped Spotify charts in Pakistan, Bangladesh and India.

== Life and career ==
Kaifi was born and raised in Karachi's neighborhood of Lyari to a family of Baloch musicians.

In 2015, he started his own YouTube channel and uploaded his first video in 2016. His first song was a cover of "Mani Tawe Dost," a Balochi tune.

He wrote and composed his verse in "Kana Yaari" three years prior to releasing it on the Coke Studio platform, singing alongside artists Eva B and Abdul Wahab Bugti.

Since its release in 2022, his Urdu language song "Kahani Suno 2.0" continues to be the top song for Spotify charts in Pakistan with 350 million plus streams to date. It also topped charts in Bangladesh and became a trending song in neighbouring India. The song's top countries for listeners include India, Pakistan, Bangladesh, the UK, US and Canada. The music video also secured a spot in YouTube's Top 10 Global Charts peaking at number 8, the first Pakistani music video to do so. It is also listed among the most-viewed Pakistani YouTube videos.

In 2023, he announced his first international tour in Jeddah, Saudi Arabia. During one of his interviews at Saudi Arabia, the artist disclosed his liking for Prague and plans to visit the city soon.

He has a vast discography with multiple songs, including Dilbar Dila Bide, Afsos, Beqaraar, Jungle Jungle, Tauba Tauba, Drog and Kadi Kaye.

Other singles released by Kaifi include Baali Guraab (2021), Kadi Kaye (2021) and Mast (2022).

== Artistry ==
He is recognized for putting a contemporary spin on traditional Balochi folk music with modern-day music.

== Discography ==
=== Singles ===
==== Urdu songs ====
Year	Song	Album	Music	Lyrics	Co-singer(s)	Ref.
2021	"Kahani Suno"	Non-album single	Kaifi Khalil			
2022	"Kahani Suno 2.0"	Non-album single	Kaifi Khalil			
2023	"Mansoob"	Non-album single	Kaifi Khalil			
2024	"Jurmana"	Non-album single	Kaifi Khalil			
2024	"Kahani Meri"	Non-album single	Anmol Daniel	Youngveer		
2024	"Khair"	Non-album single	Kaifi Khalil			
2024	"INTENTIONS"	Non-album single	Zack Knight	Himself, Zack Knight, Guree	Zack Knight	
2025	"Fitrat"	Non-album single	Kaifi Khalil	Kaifi Khalil, Ali Zaryoun	Tulsi Kumar	
2025	"Daaman"	Non-album single	Kaifi Khalil	Kaifi Khalil, Ali Zaryoun		
2025	"Shikayat"	Non-album single	Kaifi Khalil	Kaifi Khalil, Ali Zaryoun		
2026	"Love Notes"	Non-album single	Kaifi Khalil			

==== Balochi songs ====
Year	Song	Album	Music	Ref.
2020	"Daagh E Daata"	Non-album single	Himself	
2020	"Bya Ke Bacheke Abdaale"	Non-album single	Himself	
2020	"Tauba Tauba"	Non-album single	Himself	
2020	"Drog"	Non-album single	Himself	
2020	"Purr Ka'n de Glass A"	Non-album single	Himself	
2020	"Beqaraar"	Non-album single	Himself	
2021	"Qissa Wafa e Mashup"	Non-album single	Himself	
2021	"Dilbar Dila Bide"	Non-album single	Himself	
2021	"Nazul (Mashup)"	Non-album single	Himself	
2021	"Baali Guraab"	Non-album single	Himself	
2021	"Showanag"	Non-album single	Himself	
2021	"Shuthy Chamma Boro"	Non-album single	Himself	
2021	"Baali Guraab - Unplugged"	Non-album single	Himself	
2021	"Jungle Jungle"	Non-album single	Himself	
2021	"Kadi Kaye"	Non-album single	Himself	
2021	"Bya Ke Bacheke Abdaale (Unplugged)"	Non-album single	Himself	
2021	"Mallo Mallo"	Non-album single	Himself	
2021	"Tayi Yaad Atakagaa'n"	Non-album single	Himself	
2021	"Afsos"	Non-album single	Himself	
2022	"Mast"	Non-album single	Himself	
2022	"Tauseep X Urdu Mashup"	Non-album single	Himself	
2022	"Zolfe Nooda'n"	Non-album single	Himself	
2025	"Sotka Dil"	Non-album single	Himself	

=== Coke Studio Pakistan ===
Year	Season	Song	Lyrics	Music	Co-singer(s)	Ref.
2022	14	"Kana Yaari"	Himself, Eva B	Himself	Eva B, Wahab Bugti	
2024	15	"Piya Piya Calling"	Himself, Delara, Karpe		Delara, Karpe	

=== Television soundtracks ===
Year	Title	Song	Lyrics	Music	Note	Ref.
2022	Mujhe Pyaar Hua Tha	"Mujhe Pyaar Hua Tha - Title Track"	Himself		Updated version of "Kahani Suno"	
