= Karakoram (band) =

Pakistani alternative rock band

- Origin: Lahore, Punjab, Pakistan
- Genres: Alternative rock; hard rock; neo-prog; heavy metal; nu metal; alternative metal
- Years active: 2017–present
- Labels: Rearts
- Members: Sherry Khattak; Omair Farooq; Bilawal Lahooti; Zain Peerzada; Annan Noukhez

Karakoram (Urdu: قراقرم) is a Pakistani alternative rock band. The band consists of Sherry Khattak as the lead vocalist and guitarist, Omair Farooq as bassist, Bilawal Lahooti as drummer, and Zain Peerzada and Annan Noukhez as guitarists. It was formed in Lahore, Punjab in 2017.

The band came into prominence with the release of the single Yeh Dunya on season 14 of Coke Studio Pakistan, in collaboration with rappers Talha Anjum and Faris Shafi.

== History ==
They released their first extended play, Ibtida, in April 2020 which consisted of four tracks. This was followed by a debut album, Ailaan-e-Jang, in February 2021 comprising nine tracks. The album was mixed and produced by Zulfiqar Jabbar Khan and was praised for its fusion of "tastefully-mixed distortion, rip-roaring shouts, catchy lyrics and bombastic drumming".

They gained prominence with their single Yeh Dunya, which was released in collaboration with rappers Talha Anjum and Faris Shafi on season 14 of Coke Studio Pakistan and featured a fusion of "Urdu rap and heavy metal". They also contributed to the title song Dil Fatah Karain of the animated comic series Team Muhafiz, in collaboration with Soch and the Young Stunners.

Later in 2022, the band released the singles Kyun in collaboration with Hasan Raheem, Duur and Zindagi. Sherry Khatak was the associate producer for 14 season, Coke Studio Pakistan song "Kana Yaari". In March 2023, they released Gol Chakkar with guitarist Faraz Anwar.

== Musical style and influences ==
Karakoram's musical style is noted to feature elements of alternative rock, hard rock, heavy metal, neo-prog, nu metal and alternative metal. In terms of drawing influences, their style has been compared to that of Linkin Park, Foo Fighters, Porcupine Tree, Bring Me the Horizon, as well as Pakistani bands such as Entity Paradigm and Call.
