= Talwinder =

Talwinder is a given name. People with the name include:

- Talwinder Singh (born 1994), Indian field hockey player
- Talwinder Singh Parmar (1944–1992), Sikh militant from India

== See also ==
- Talwiinder (born 1997), Indian singer-songwriter
