= Delara (singer) =

Norwegian and Iranian singer (born 1997)

Delara دلارا
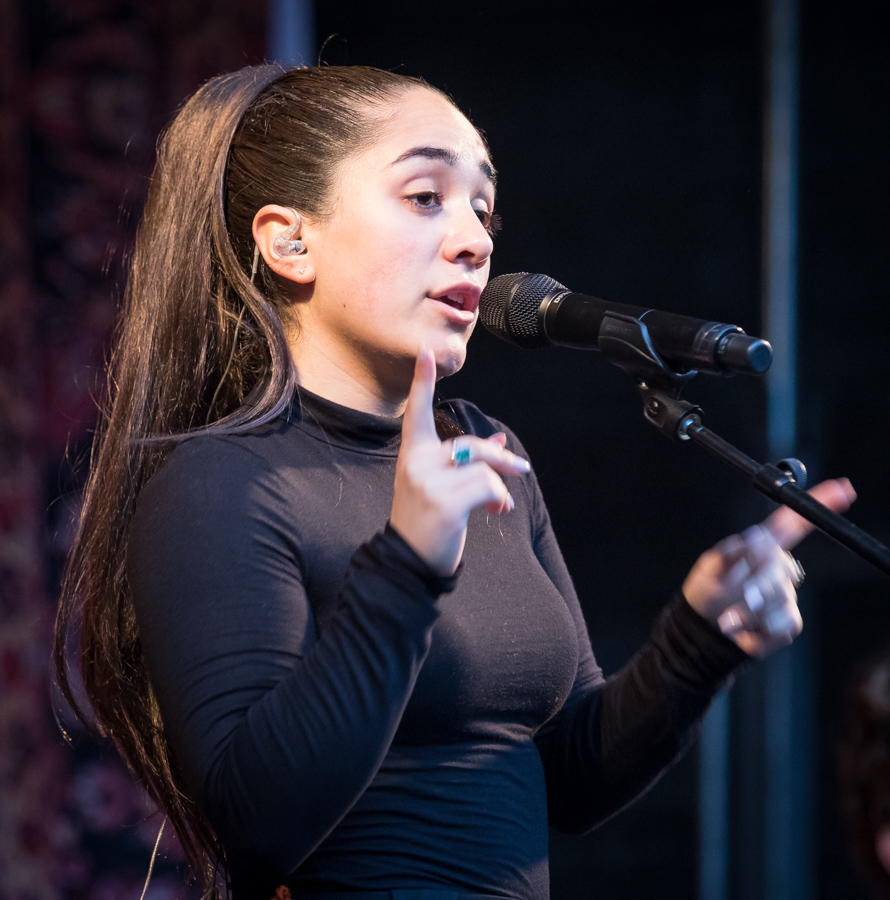
- Delara performing in 2017

Background information
- Also known as: Amanda Delara
- Born: Delara Nikman; 1997 (age 28–29); Sweden
- Origin: Norway
- Genres: Pop; R&B
- Occupations: Singer; songwriter
- Instruments: Vocals; piano
- Years active: 2016–present
- Labels: GR:OW; Sony
- Website: amandadelara.com

Amanda Delara Nikman (Persian: آماندا دلارا نیکمن; born 1997), known by her stage name Delara (formerly Amanda Delara), is a Norwegian and Iranian singer. Starting her career in 2016 with debut single, "Paper Paper", she has released four EPs and one studio album, Shahrazad (2023). In 2024, her song "Siste dans", from the film The Snow Sister, reached number-one in Norway.

== Early life ==
Delara Nikman (Note: In an interview with NRK P3, Delara says she was born with the given name Delara; when her family moved to Norway, her parents decided she needed a Norwegian name so her name became both Delara and Amanda.) was born in Sweden in 1997 to Iranian parents. Her mother grew up in Iran during the war with Iraq and was raised by a single mother. Delara moved to Norway at the age of one, spending fourteen years in Lillehammer, and subsequently in Neskollen from the age of fifteen. Her original plan was to become a doctor. At the age of six, she heard "Numb/Encore" by Jay-Z and Linkin Park, which had a lasting impact on her; she describes it as the first time she felt a love for music. Delara won a school talent competition, which led her to think that she could pursue a career in music. She started making music full-time after secondary school.

As a teenager, Delara would post videos on Instagram of her singing while playing piano. At the age of sixteen, she got a hold of the Snapchat account of Kaveh, a fellow Norwegian–Iranian artist who was popular at the time, and sent him videos of herself singing. He invited Delara to his studio in Økern, Oslo, and became a mentor to her, helping her with recording her self-written songs.

== Career ==
Debut single "Paper Paper" was released in August 2016 under the name Amanda Delara, through the independent record label GR:OW. The dark pop song reached Spotify's Viral charts both globally and in the US. She additionally signed with Sony Music Norway in 2017, prior to the release of R&B follow-up singles "Dirhamz" and "New Generation", and Delara's first EP, Rebel, released later that year. In the same year, she also released a cover of "Gunerius" by Karpe (Note: At the time, Karpe used the stage name Karpe Diem.), which was featured in the Norwegian television series Skam.

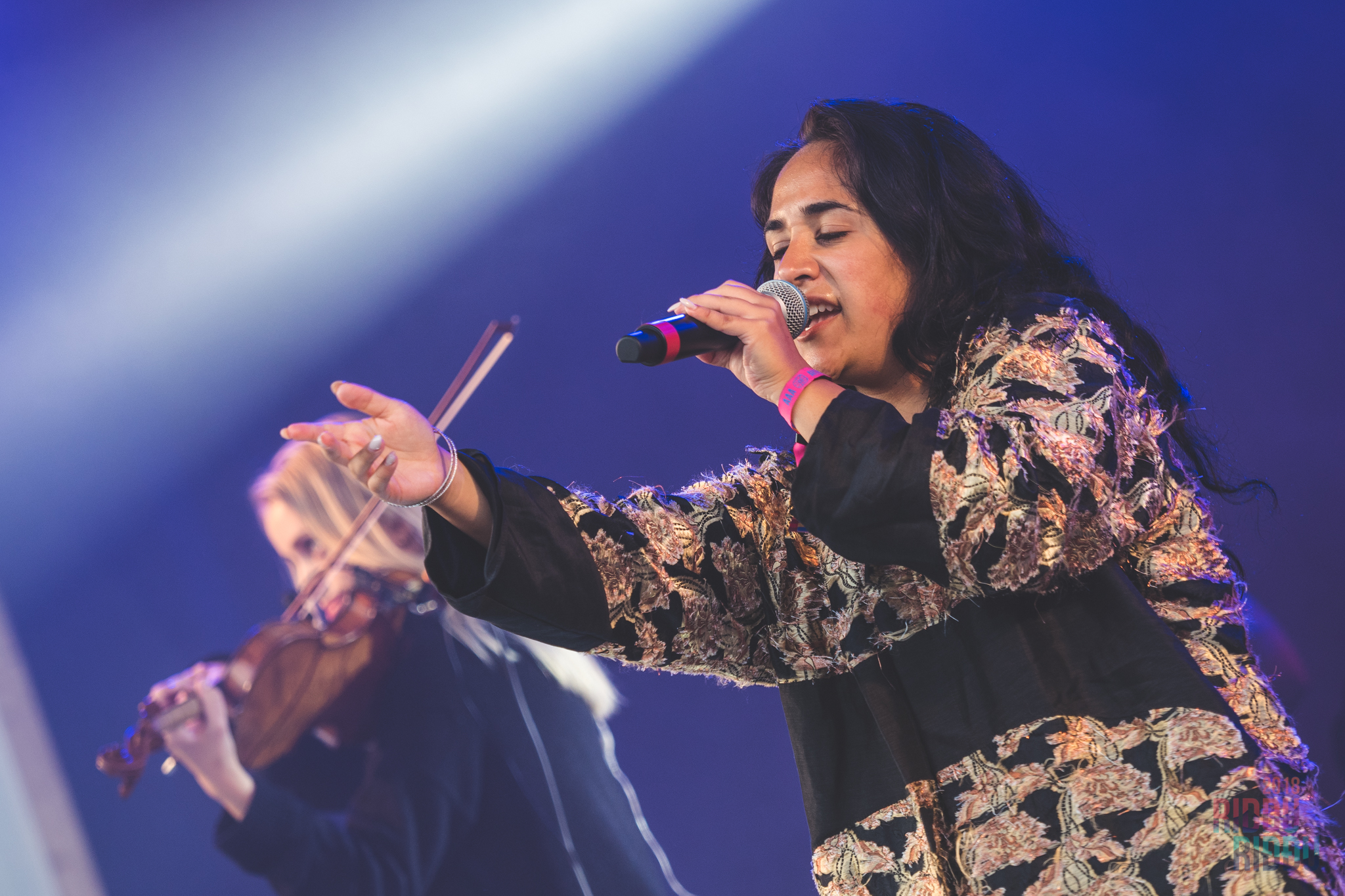
Delara performing in 2018

The single "We Don't Run from Anyone" was released in early 2018, and was used as the theme song to the television series Mesternes mester. It was included on her second EP, Running Deep, released in May 2018, which Delara described as showcasing a more personal side of herself. The EP, along with the follow-up single "Soldiers" produced by Askjell Solstrand, garnered Delara a nomination at the 2018 Spellemannprisen in the category of Pop Artist of the Year.

Et lite stykke Norge, Delara's third EP and her first in Norwegian, was released in January 2020. Its cover features Bjørnstjerne Bjørnson, considered one of the most influential Norwegian writers, and its lyrics discuss Delara's identity as a minority in Norway, as well as the Law of Jante, crime, and self-confidence. Some of its content was incorporated into the national curriculum for secondary schools in Norway. In September 2020, she decided to use the mononymous Delara as her stage name. Later that year, "Checka", a collaboration with rapper Loredana, became a hit in German-speaking Europe, charting in the top five in three countries and earning Gold certifications in Austria and Switzerland. It was included on her fourth EP, Timepiece, released in May 2021 and created during the COVID-19 pandemic, which features music that is more calm and the productions less heavy.

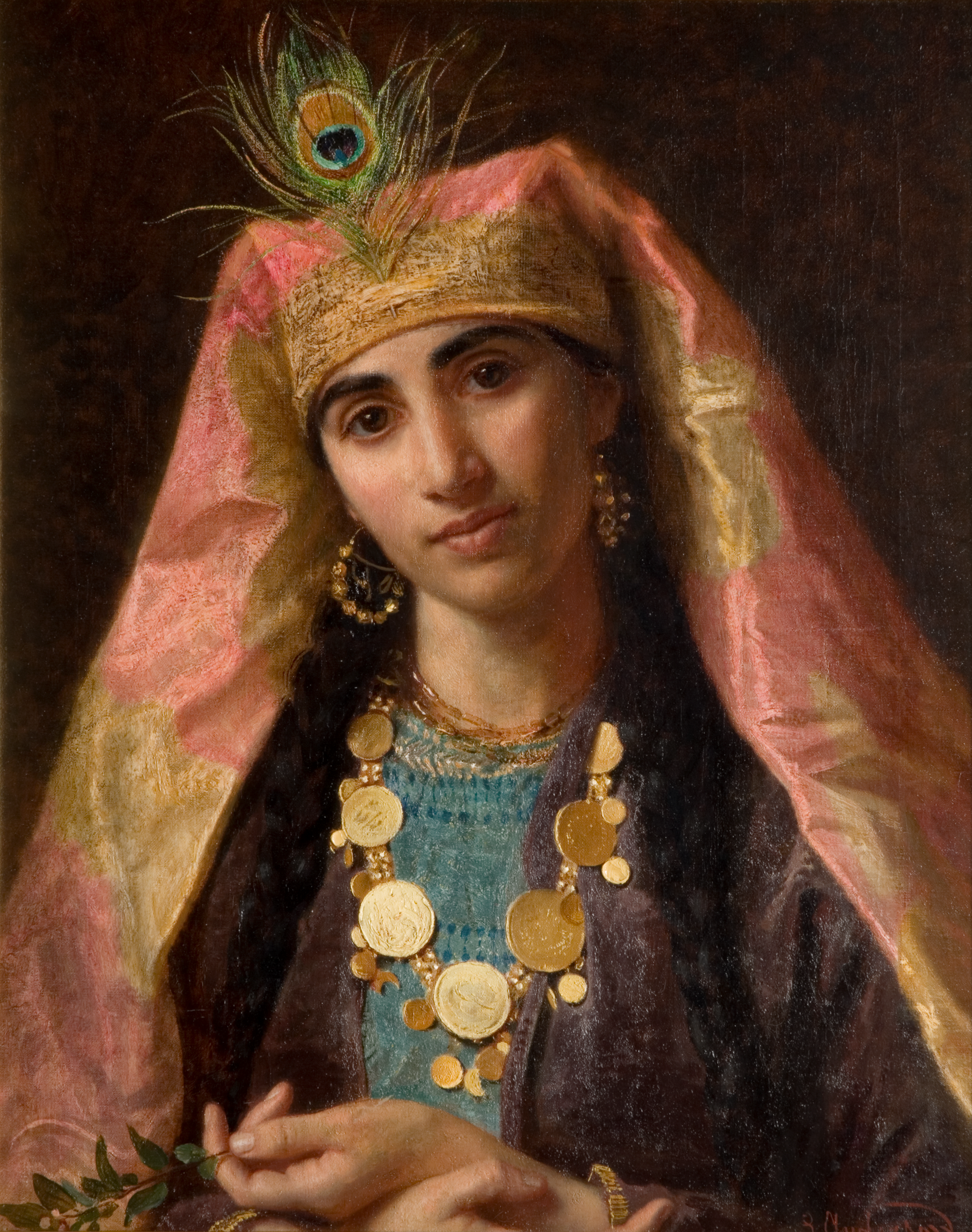
Shahrazad (2023), Delara's debut album, was named after the character (depiction pictured) from One Thousand and One Nights.

In May 2023, Delara was one of seventy women of colour who accompanied Alicia Keys in a reimagined version of "If I Ain't Got You" for the soundtrack of Queen Charlotte: A Bridgerton Story. In June 2023, Delara's Norwegian-language cover of the Swedish-language "Josefin" by Albin Lee Meldau became popular on TikTok, resulting in her releasing a studio version. It charted at number two in Norway and has been certified double platinum by IFPI Norge. Shahrazad, Delara's debut album, was released in November 2023; it was named after the character of the same name from the Middle Eastern folk tale collection One Thousand and One Nights. At the 2023 Spellemannprisen ceremony, Shahrazad won in the category of Release of the Year.

In 2024, Delara appeared on the fifteenth season of Coke Studio Pakistan, contributing to the song "Piya Piya Calling" alongside Karpe, Pakistani singer Kaifi Khalil, and Norwegian dance group Quick Style. The song was recorded remotely, with its music video shot in mid-2023, and features lyrics in Arabic, Balochi, English, Persian, Gujarati, Norwegian, and Urdu. It became a top-five hit in Norway and went on to win the P3 Gull for Song of the Year at the 2024 ceremony, where Delara had two additional nominations. "Siste dans", a Christmas song written for the film The Snow Sister (2024), became viral on social media, with the song being used in videos to memorialise people who had died. It reached number-one in Norway in November 2024, becoming Delara's song to do so.

=== Other ventures ===
In 2021, Delara participated in the reality television series Over Atlanteren, where she and five other Norwegian celebrities with little sailing experience were tasked with sailing across the Atlantic Ocean.

== Personal life ==
Delara has an Iranian passport and has been active bringing awareness to social issues affecting Iran such as human rights abuses. Following the death of Mahsa Amini, Delara collaborated with Amnesty International to organise a protest in front of the Norwegian parliament in late 2022, with over 1,000 participants. At the red carpet of the 2022 P3 Gull ceremony, Delara carried a sign in support of Iranian rapper Toomaj Salehi, who was arrested during protests.

Delara speaks Persian and was interviewed on the Persian-language channel Iran International about her activism. Though most of her songs are in English, she has also released songs in Norwegian. In addition, Delara revealed she was teaching herself Spanish during the COVID-19 pandemic.

== Discography ==
=== Studio albums ===
Title	Details	Peak chart positions	Certifications
Title	Details	NOR	Certifications
Shahrazad	Released: 10 November 2023; Label: GR:OW Records; Format: Digital download, streaming	—	
Sjelen	Released: 8 May 2026; Label: GR:OW Records; Format: Digital download, streaming	1	IFPI NOR: Gold

=== EPs ===
Title	Details
Rebel	Released: 14 July 2017; Label: GR:OW Records; Format: Digital download, streaming
Running Deep	Released: 11 May 2018; Label: GR:OW Records; Format: Digital download, streaming
Et lite stykke Norge	Released: 10 January 2020; Label: GR:OW Records; Format: Digital download, streaming
Timepiece	Released: 7 May 2021; Label: GR:OW Records; Format: Digital download, streaming

=== Singles ===
List of singles, with year released and chart positions
Single	Year	Peak positions					Certifications	Album
Single	Year	NOR	AUT	CHE	DEU	SWE	Certifications	Album
"Paper Paper"	2016	—	—	—	—	—		Rebel
"Dirhamz"	2017	—	—	—	—	—	IFPI Norge: Gold	Rebel
"Gunerius" (remix)	2017	—	—	—	—	—	IFPI Norge: 2× Platinum	Non-album single
"New Generation"	2017	—	—	—	—	—	IFPI Norge: Gold	Rebel
"Tilbake til meg" (with Arshad Maimouni and Lars Vaular)	2017	—	—	—	—	—		Non-album single
"We Don't Run from Anyone"	2018	—	—	—	—	—		Running Deep
"Keep Your Dollars"	2018	—	—	—	—	—		Running Deep
"Soldiers"	2018	—	—	—	—	—	IFPI Norge: Gold	Non-album single
"Nå er det oss"	2020	— (Note: "Nå er det oss" did not enter the Norwegian Singles Chart, but peaked at number one on the Norwegian airplay chart.)	—	—	—	—	IFPI Norge: Platinum	Et lite stykke Norge
"Tell Me One Thing"	2020	—	—	—	—	—		Non-album single
"Checka" (with Loredana)	2020	—	4	5	2	—	IFPI Austria: Gold; IFPI Schweiz: Gold	Medusa and Timepiece
"Shark Tank"	2021	—	—	—	—	—		Timepiece
"Swole"	2021	—	—	—	—	—		Timepiece
"Gone for the Night" (with Robbz x Brookz and Adaam)	2021	—	—	—	—	— (Note: "Gone for the Night" did not enter the Swedish Singles Chart, but peaked at number fourteen on the Swedish Heatseeker chart.)		Non-album singles
"People Come and Go"	2022	—	—	—	—	—		Non-album singles
"Som noen går" (with Yosef Wolde-Mariam and Jonas Benyoub)	2022	—	—	—	—	—		Non-album singles
"Josefin"	2023	2	—	—	—	30	IFPI Norge: 2× Platinum; IFPI Sverige: Gold	Non-album singles
"Unbound"	2023	—	—	—	—	—		Shahrazad
"Didn't You Know"	2023	—	—	—	—	—		Shahrazad
"Kalash" (featuring Beam)	2023	—	—	—	—	—		Shahrazad
"Volare"	2024	20	—	—	—	—	IFPI Norge: Gold	Non-album single
"Piya Piya Calling" (with Karpe and Kaifi Khalil featuring the Quick Style)	2024	5	—	—	—	—		Coke Studio Season 15
"Siste dans"	2024	1	—	—	—	—	IFPI Norge: 2× Platinum	Non-album singles
"Kalash Reimagined" (with Talal Qureshi and Charan featuring Beam)	2025	—	—	—	—	—		Non-album singles
"Sjelen"	2026	1	—	—	—	—		Sjelen
"Trist Masochist"	2026	2	—	—	—	—		Sjelen
"Himmelen brenner"	2026	5	—	—	—	—		Sjelen
"Hele uka"	2026	46	—	—	—	—		Sjelen
"—" denotes singles that did not chart or were not released.

=== Featured singles ===
List of featured singles, with year released and chart positions
Single	Year	Peak positions		Certifications	Album
Single	Year	NOR	DEN	Certifications	Album
"Tæt på" (Tobias Rahim featuring Delara)	2025	10	13	IFPI Danmark: Platinum	Vulkanø

== Awards and nominations ==
Award	Year	Category	Nominee(s)	Result	Ref.
Gaffa Awards	2017	Norwegian Newcomer of the Year	Amanda Delara	Won	
Norwegian Music Publishers Award	2021	Work of the Year – Popular Music	"Nå er det oss"	Nominated	
Norwegian Music Publishers Award	2025	Creator of the Year – Popular Music	Amanda Delara Nikman	Nominated	
Norwegian Music Publishers Award	2025	Song of the Year – Popular Music	"Piya Piya Calling" (with Karpe, Kaifi Khalil and the Quick Style)	Nominated	
Ole Vig Prize	2024	—N/a	Amanda Delara	Won	
P3 Gull	2017	Newcomer of the Year	Amanda Delara	Nominated	
P3 Gull	2020	Song of the Year	"Nå er det oss"	Nominated	
P3 Gull	2024	Artist of the Year	Delara	Nominated	
P3 Gull	2024	Song of the Year	"Piya Piya Calling" (with Karpe, Kaifi Khalil and the Quick Style)	Won	
P3 Gull	2024	Song of the Year	"Volare"	Nominated	
Spellemannprisen	2018	Pop Artist of the Year	Running Deep and "Soldiers"	Nominated	
Spellemannprisen	2023	Lyricist of the Year	Amanda Delara Nikman – Shahrazad	Nominated	
Spellemannprisen	2023	Pop	Shahrazad	Nominated	
Spellemannprisen	2023	Release of the Year	Shahrazad	Won	
