= Kesari (soundtrack) =

2019 film soundtrack album

Soundtrack album by Tanishk Bagchi, Arko Pravo Mukherjee, Chirantan Bhatt, Jasbir Jassi, Gurmoh, Jasleen Royal and Rishi Rich
- Released: 18 March 2019
- Recorded: 2018–2019
- Genre: Feature film soundtrack
- Length: 38:39
- Languages: Hindi; Punjabi
- Label: Zee Music Company
External audio
- Audio Jukebox on YouTube

Kesari is the soundtrack album to the 2019 film of the same name directed by Anurag Singh, starring Akshay Kumar and Parineeti Chopra. The album featured twelve songs composed by Tanishk Bagchi, Arko Pravo Mukherjee, Chirantan Bhatt, Jasbir Jassi, Gurmoh, Jasleen Royal and Rishi Rich with lyrics written by Kumaar, Manoj Muntashir, Kunwar Juneja and Bagchi.

The soundtrack was released under the Zee Music Company label on 18 March 2019, to positive reviews from critics and nominated for five Filmfare Awards, three International Indian Film Academy Awards with a win for Best Lyricist, six Zee Cine Awards, with a win in the same category and five Mirchi Music Awards, winning Album of The Year. B Praak won the National Film Award for Best Male Playback Singer for his vocals in the song "Teri Mitti".

== Background ==
The soundtrack to Kesari featured compilation of works from multiple musicians; Bagchi composed two songs "Ve Maahi" and "Sanu Kehndi", while Arko composed the tune for "Teri Mitti" and Bhatt did the same for "Ajj Singh Garjega". The film also featured hymns from Guru Nanak and Guru Gobind Singh—"Ek Onkaar" and "Deh Shiva Bar Mohe Eha"—which were adapted and arranged by Jasbir Jassi, Gurmoh and Jasleen Royal.

Azeem Dayani, who handled the creative direction at Dharma Productions served as the music supervisor for Kesari. He initially revealed that the song "Teri Mitti" was not a part of the film, but Arko who observed and understood the story, composed the tune within 10–15 days. Muntashir wanted the song to reflect the last thoughts of a dying soldier. The singer B Praak described it as one of the toughest songs in his career, adding "It's a powerful song that tells an incredible story and invokes patriotic fervour. So, to do justice to it was something I was very adamant about."

== Release ==
The first song from the film "Sanu Kehndi" was released on 27 February 2019. Later, the second song "Ajj Singh Garjega" was released on 5 March. The song "Teri Mitti" was preceded as the third single from the album on 15 March. The album was released on 18 March, three days ahead of the film's release, under the Zee Music Company record label. On 22 March, coinciding with the film's release, the music video of "Ve Maahi", a romantic number picturized on Kumar and Chopra, was released.

A female version of "Teri Mitti" was performed by Chopra and released on 17 April. A reprised version of the song was released on 24 April 2020, as a tribute to the doctors and healthcare workers during the COVID-19 pandemic in India and lockdown in India. This version garnered 8 million views on YouTube.

== Track listing ==
No.	Title	Lyrics	Music	Singer(s)	Length
1.	"Ek Onkaar"	Guru Nanak	Jasbir Jassi	Jasbir Jassi	1:02
2.	"Ve Maahi"	Tanishk Bagchi	Tanishk Bagchi	Arijit Singh, Tanishk Bagchi, Asees Kaur	3:44
3.	"Teri Mitti"	Manoj Muntashir	Arko	B Praak	5:14
4.	"Sanu Kehndi"	Kumaar	Tanishk Bagchi	Romy, Brijesh Shandilya	2:48
5.	"Ajj Singh Garjega"	Kunwar Juneja	Chirantan Bhatt	Jazzy B	4:02
6.	"Deh Shiva" (Male)	Guru Gobind Singh	Gurmoh	Sukhwinder Singh	3:11
7.	"Deh Shiva" (Female)	Guru Gobind Singh	Jasleen Royal	Jasleen Royal	2:36
8.	"Teri Mitti" (Female)	Manoj Muntashir	Arko	Parineeti Chopra	3:37
9.	"Teri Mitti" (Tribute Version) (Male)	Manoj Muntashir	Arko	B Praak	3:48
10.	"Teri Mitti" (Tribute Version) (Female)	Manoj Muntashir	Arko	Jyotica Tangri	3:48
11.	"Judai Pae Jaani"	Anurag Singh	Raju Singh	Yuvraj Hans	1:43
12.	"Ve Maahi" (Remix)	Tanishk Bagchi	Tanishk Bagchi, Rishi Rich	Arijit Singh, Tanishk Bagchi, Asees Kaur, Veronica, Rishi Rich	3:06
Total length:					38:39

== Reception ==
Soumya Vajpayee of The Times of India wrote "the soundtrack of Kesari celebrates Punjabi flavour from the word go". Joginder Tuteja of Bollywood Hungama rated 3 out of 5 and wrote "Kesari does well in packing as many as seven tracks in there and cuts across genres while still maintaining a consistent sound. The music is the kind that should earn longevity for itself once the film has a long run in theatres." Pratishruti Ganguly of Firstpost noted that all the compositions have been "made to comfortably fit into the fabric of the film" describing it as "rousing, evocative and powerful". Anupama Chopra of Film Companion described it as a "plaintive soundtrack".

== Controversies ==
Two years after its release, Muntashir was accused of plagiarism, as the lines from the song "Teri Mitti" had been based on a similar tune from a 2005 Pakistani song, but the lyricist denied its claims and stated that the song was sung by Indian folk singer Geeta Rabari.

== Awards and nominations ==
The song "Teri Mitti" lost the Filmfare Award for Best Lyricist to "Apna Time Aayega" from Gully Boy (2019), to which Muntashir expressed disappointment on his Twitter post, pledging not to attend future award ceremonies. Muntashir's tweet gained support from fans and other musicians alike.

Award	Date of ceremony	Category	Recipient(s)	Result	Ref(s)
ETC Bollywood Business Awards	16 February 2020	Romantic Song of the Year	"Ve Maahi"	Won	
Filmfare Awards	15 February 2020	Best Music Director	Tanishk Bagchi, Arko Pravo Mukherjee, Chirrantan Bhatt, Jasbir Jassi, Gurmoh and Jasleen Royal	Nominated	
Filmfare Awards	15 February 2020	Best Lyricist	Manoj Muntashir for "Teri Mitti"	Nominated	
Filmfare Awards	15 February 2020	Best Lyricist	Tanishk Bagchi for "Ve Maahi"	Nominated	
Filmfare Awards	15 February 2020	Best Male Playback Singer	Arijit Singh for "Ve Maahi"	Nominated	
Filmfare Awards	15 February 2020	Best Male Playback Singer	B Praak for "Teri Mitti"	Nominated	
International Indian Film Academy Awards	24 November 2021	Best Music Director	Tanishk Bagchi, Arko Pravo Mukherjee, Chirrantan Bhatt, Jasbir Jassi, Gurmoh and Jasleen Royal	Nominated	
International Indian Film Academy Awards	24 November 2021	Best Lyricist	Manoj Muntashir for "Teri Mitti"	Won	
International Indian Film Academy Awards	24 November 2021	Best Male Playback Singer	B Praak for "Teri Mitti"	Nominated	
Mirchi Music Awards	19 February 2020	Album of the Year	Kesari	Won	
Mirchi Music Awards	19 February 2020	Listeners Choice Album of the Year	Kesari	Nominated	
Mirchi Music Awards	19 February 2020	Song of the Year	"Ve Maahi"	Nominated	
Mirchi Music Awards	19 February 2020	Male Vocalist of the Year	B Praak for "Teri Mitti"	Nominated	
Mirchi Music Awards	19 February 2020	Lyricist of the Year	Manoj Muntashir for "Teri Mitti"	Nominated	
National Film Awards	25 October 2021	Best Male Playback Singer	B Praak for "Teri Mitti"	Won	
Nickelodeon Kids' Choice Awards India	21 December 2019	Favourite Bollywood Movie Song	"Ve Maahi"	Won	
Zee Cine Awards	13 March 2020	Best Music Director	Tanishk Bagchi, Arko Pravo Mukherjee, Chirrantan Bhatt, Jasbir Jassi, Gurmoh and Jasleen Royal	Nominated	
Zee Cine Awards	13 March 2020	Best Lyricist	Manoj Muntashir for "Teri Mitti"	Won	
Zee Cine Awards	13 March 2020	Best Lyricist	Tanishk Bagchi for "Ve Maahi"	Nominated	
Zee Cine Awards	13 March 2020	Best Playback Singer – Male	B Praak for "Teri Mitti"	Nominated	
Zee Cine Awards	13 March 2020	Best Playback Singer – Male	Arijit Singh for "Ve Maahi"	Nominated	
Zee Cine Awards	13 March 2020	Song of the Year	"Ve Maahi"	Nominated	
