= Team Muhafiz =

Pakistani comic book series

- Author: Imran Azhar
- Language: English; Urdu
- Series: Team Muhafiz (series)
- Genre: Superhero; crime fiction
- Published: AzCorp Comics
- Publication date: 2015; 11 years ago
- Publication place: Pakistan
- Website: www.azcorpentertainment.com

Team Muhafiz (Urdu: ٹیم محافظ) is a Pakistani comic book series featuring an organized group of fictional teenage Pakistani crime fighting superheroes launched in August 2015. The team faces the real-life issues of trafficking, terrorism and in its third issue, child marriages. The goal of the team is to fight these real-life social issues that have haunted Karachi, including extremists ideologies and consists of members belonging to Islam as well as minority religions, such as Christianity.

== Animated series ==
The Inter-Services Public Relations (ISPR) presents an animated series, directed by Riyan Durrani. The series is a joint venture of ISPR & Geo Productions in association with AZ Corp. Fahad Nabi is the producer of the series while its art director is Kamran Khan while the script is written by renowned writer Fakhir Rizvi. The OST 'Dil Fatah Karain' released on June 3, 2022. Soch Band, Karakoram, and Young Stunners are featured in the song "Dil Fatah Karain".
