= Khan FM =

Pakistani influencer

- Born: Faraz Khan
- Known for: Chronicles of Khan
- Notable work: Spotify, Coke Studio

Khan FM (born Faraz Khan) is a Dubai-born singer-songwriter, and lead vocalist and one of three guitarists for the Dubai-based rock band, Chronicles of Khan. He has also released music under the name Sound of Nomads & is currently leading Artist & Label Partnerships in South Asian emerging markets for Spotify.

== Early life and career ==
Khan FM started his career as a TV presenter for music videos and artists from South Asia. After working on various music festivals, concerts in his early twenties, he worked for Red Bull Music as a Culture Marketing Manager.

Khan is also known for his contribution to Pakistani Music during the early to mid-2000's as a presenter & producer for a television music show called ‘Rock On’ which aired on the ARY Digital Network. Khan played a vital role in introducing bands like Entity Paradigm, Call, Roxen, Jal, Aaroh, and Mekaal Hassan Band to wider audiences via the music show he hosted on a global TV station.

He formed his band Chronicles of Khan in 2018. Khan has also played a pivotal role in promoting Coke Studio Season 14 on Spotify. He was also one of the speakers at Spotify's First Master class for Artist Community of Pakistan.

== Chronicles of Khan ==
Chronicles of Khan was created as a solo outlet for Khan to move away from his then underground band Universal Rogue. During the early days, his best friend Sean Walters supported Khan's new endeavor & suggested adding more members which eventually turned Chronicles of Khan into a full-fledged rock band. The band name was taken from a 2010 fantasy film the night he decided to start the new music journey.

Formed in 2016, Chronicles of Khan released their first album in the form of an ep titled Legacies & Bequests in 2018. With a launch show at Virgin Megastore, the band gigged consistently across the UAE as well as performed at a major festival in Pakistan. The first single of the record was titled Jokers Ball, followed by a fan favorite track named Halo.

The band found itself amidst popularity in the UAE underground music scene and soon became one of Dubai's best Original Rock & Roll bands. The attention soon led to the band performing at various festivals such as Middle East Film & Comic Con, Mother of Nation Festival Abu Dhabi, Beats on the Beach Abu Dhabi, and Dubai Drone Prix.

While recording their follow up record, the band was faced with a sudden hiatus in 2020 due to the COVID-19 pandemic. Since then, the members have parted ways with the future of the band coming to a uncertain halt.
