= Afusic =

Pakistani rapper

- Born: Affan Khan; Hyderabad, Sindh, Pakistan
- Genres: Hip hop, Pop, South Asian fusion
- Occupations: Rapper, singer, songwriter
- Years active: 2020–present

Affan Khan "Afusic" is a Pakistani rapper, singer, songwriter, and lyricist known for fusing traditional South Asian melodies and themes with contemporary hip-hop beats. His song "Pal Pal" (2025) featuring Ali Soomro, became one of the most-viewed Pakistani YouTube videos with more than 500 million views. It also topped the Asian Music Chart. The remake of the song "Pal Pal" featuring Talwiinder, (2025) reached the 20th spot on the Official Video Chart, published by the Official Charts Company. In 2025, Spotify Pakistan listed Afusic among the "Future Stars".

== Early life ==
Affan Khan was born in Hyderabad, Pakistan, to his father, Azeem Sarwar Khan, a singer himself. He developed a passion for music at a young age. His father and local musical traditions influenced his musical journey. He adopted the stage name "Afusic" and officially began releasing music around 2020.

== Career ==
In 2025, Afusic gained wider recognition with his single "Pal Pal" featuring Ali Soomro, which went viral and crossed 500 million views on YouTube, and peaked at 1 on the Official Asian Music Chart, 11 on the Official Video Streaming Chart, 33 on the Official Hip Hop and R&B Singles Chart, and 94 at the Official Singles Charts published by the Official Charts Company and 94 at the Canadian Hot 100 published by the Billboard.

In April 2025, Afusic collaborated with Indian singer, Talwiinder for the remake of the single "Pal Pal", which peaked at 20 on the Official Video Charts by the Official Charts Company. The song was subsequently removed from Spotify India in May 2025, following a government advisory that led to the removal of all Pakistani-origin content from Indian digital platforms. This directive was issued in response to national security concerns following the Pahalgam terrorist attack on April 22, 2025

In the same year, he collaborated with Hassan Raheem for another track "Kanwal".

== Discography ==
=== Singles ===
Year	Title	Featured artist(s)	Album	Note	Ref.
2023	"Ek Baar"	—	Non-album single		
2023	"Out of Your Mind"	Ali Soomro	Non-album single		
2024	"Heer"	Ali Soomro	Non-album single		
2024	"Calling"	Ali Soomro	Non-album single		
2025	"Pal Pal"	Ali Soomro	Non-album single		
2025	"Pal Pal" (with Talwiinder)	Ali Soomro, Talwiinder	Non-album single		
2025	"Kanwal"	Ali Soomro, Hasan Raheem	Non-album single		
2025	"Kanwal" (Acoustic)	Ali Soomro	Non-album single		
2026	"Let U Go"	Ali Soomro, Hasan Raheem	Non-album single		
2026	"Not Enough"	Ali Soomro	Non-album single		
2026	"Pal Pal" (Sickick Remix)	Ali Soomro, Talwiinder, Sickick	Non-album single		
2026	"Dil"	Ali Soomro, Zoha Waseem	Coke Studio Nu.WAV		
2026	"Qasam"	Shae Gill, Abdullah Kasumbi	Coke Studio Nu.WAV		

== Personal life ==
On 30 January 2026, Khan got married in a private nikah ceremony attended by close family members and friends.

== Media image ==
In 2025, Spotify Pakistan listed Afusic among "Future Stars" and featured him as its global Radar program's featured artist for the third quarter of the year.
