= Team Muhafiz (TV series) =

Pakistani animated television series

- Urdu: ٹیم محافظ
- Genre: Action; Comedy; Superhero fiction Edutainment
- Based on: Team Muhafiz by Imran Azhar
- Written by: Fakhir Rizvi
- Directed by: Riyan Durrani; Kamran Khan
- Starring: Ahsan Khan; Wahaj Ali; Sajal Aly; Nayyar Ejaz; Shafaat Ali; Dananeer Mobeen; Nimra Rafiq; Adeel Khaan
- Narrated by: Ahsan Khan
- Theme music composer: Soch; Sherry Khattak
- Opening theme: "Dil Fatah Karain" by Soch Band, Karakoram Band and Young Stunners
- Ending theme: "Dil Fatah Karain" by Soch Band, Karakoram Band and Young Stunners
- Composer: Ali Mustafa
- Country of origin: Pakistan
- Original language: Urdu
- No. of seasons: 1
- No. of episodes: 10 (List of episodes)

Production
- Producers: Fahad Nabi; Kamran Khan
- Animator: Owais Nasir
- Editor: Syed Salman Nasir
- Camera setup: Multiple-camera setup Animation camera Rostrum camera
- Running time: 15-20 Minutes
- Production companies: ISPR; Geo Production; AZ Corporation

Original release
- Network: Geo Entertainment; Geo News; ISPR; Geo Super; Geo Kahani
- Release: 25 June – 17 September 2022

Related
- Burka Avenger

Team Muhafiz is a 2022 Pakistani animated television series directed by Riyan Durrani and Kamran Khan, produced by Fahad Nabi and written by Fakhir Rizvi. The series is a joint venture of Inter-Services Public Relations (ISPR) & Geo Productions in association with AZ Corp. It is based on the Pakistani comic book Team Muhafiz by Imran Azhar.

It features an group of fictional teenage Pakistani crime fighting superheroes.The team confronts the real-life challenges of trafficking, terrorism and in its third issue child marriages, including extremist ideologies. The superheroes subscribe to Islam as well as minority religions, such as Christianity.

== Synopsis ==
The story revolves around a group of young people who volunteer at a youth center and have made it their mission to rid society of social inequities and other evils. Fairness, compassion, and justice for everyone are the ideals they want to instill in everyone. They confront injustice with their special powers and the help of Sir Farman, their mentor.

== Plot ==
=== Episode 1 | Parchi ===
With an introduction, Team Muhafiz comes face to face with a dangerous gang of extortionists. The gang harasses the shopkeepers to pay their dues. Team Muhafiz defend the Streets by fighting with the Gang. In the End Team Muhafiz won the Battle.

=== Episode 2 | Zeher ===
'Zeher' features Team Muhafiz taking on a new mission, as they save the youth from an otherwise inevitable downfall. They win hearts of the community by busting a mafia of drug barons. But danger awaits Team Muhafiz all the Time.

=== Episode 3 | Purisrar Aag ===
Team Muhafiz was unaware of the Super natural forces, or evil humanity at work. While trying to do their part in saving the planet, Team Muhafiz faces blowback, as they finally come face to face with the enemy lurking around the corner.

=== Episode 4 | Deemak ===
Team Muhafiz is on the case uncovering clues to the menace of bribery. But they face backlash as the enemy strikes back. Team Muhafiz manage to counter Rawka's nefarious plans to defend the society.

=== Episode 5 | Final Match ===
Tensions rise for Team Muhafiz as the final hockey match between Pakistan and Germany seems like the perfect opportunity for Rawka to strike. Rawaka makes light towers defunct but Parinaaz fights well, makes the lights on and the stopped match starts.

=== Episode 6 | Kaali Tijarat ===
As Zane faces a ruthless human trafficking network, Team Muhafiz realizes that Rawka's evilness is only the tip of the iceberg.

=== Episode 7 | Rah Zann ===
As Rawka goes down, The crime rates go up in the Society. Team Muhafiz is astounded to uncover an enormous crime network and realize that the dark waters of the mafias running deep.

=== Episode 8 | Qaidi Bachpann ===
Team Muhafiz comes across a deeply saddening situation of child exploitation in society. Team Muhafiz heroes manage to tackle the menace with Rawka pounce.

=== Episode 9 | Ghaat ===
Team Muhafiz is ready and willing to lend a hand to the Government Counter Terrorism Department. The country needs it's heroes but the Team Muhafiz ready to give the ultimate sacrifice for the nation Motherland.

=== Episode 10 | Pehli Uraan (Finale) ===
Team Muhafiz mentor, Sir Farmaan got seriously injured after a fight with the goons, he was last seen in the ICU. However, the work on Pakistan-China 5th Generation fighter aircraft production was streamlined. The team fights well to defend the country from terrorism and ends with the death of Sir Farman.

== Cast ==
- Sajal Aly as Parinaaz
- Ahsan Khan as Farman
- Wahaj Ali as Reza
- Nayyar Ejaz as Rawka
- Shafaat Ali as Zane
- Nimra Rafiq as Aarya
- Dananeer Mobeen as Mahnoor
- Adeel Khaan as Badshah Khan
- Abid Hasan as Seth Riz

== Soundtrack ==
"Dil Fateh Karain"

Song by Soch Band, Karakoram Band and Young Stunners
- Released: 3 June 2022
- Recorded: 2022
- Length: 4:12
- Label: Geo Entertainment; ISPR
- Composers: Soch the Band and Sherry Khattak
- Lyricists: Asim Raza and Adnan Dhool
- Producer: Fahad Nabi

Music video
- Dil Fatah Karain-Team Muhafiz OST on YouTube

The OST Dil Fatah Karain released on 3 June 2022 by Geo Entertainment and ISPR. Soch Band, Karakoram Band, and Young Stunners are featured in the song Dil Fatah Karain.

== Production ==
In January 2022, it was Reported that Inter-Services Public Relations is working with Geo Network on an upcoming project Team Muhafiz. Later in a statement, ISPR and Geo Network confirms the project which features Wahaj Ali, Sajal Aly and Ahsan Khan in leading voice over roles. ISPR more said that, "We are now working working with Geo Entertainment for upcoming series which will be the Joint venture of Geo Network and ISPR".This is the Third major installment for ISPR collaboration beneath Ehd-e-Wafa for Hum TV and Sinf-e-Aahan for ARY Digital. The teaser released on 14 May 2022 by Geo Entertainment and the ISPR.

== See also ==
- List of programs broadcast by Geo Entertainment
- ISPR media Productions
- Burka Avenger
- List of Pakistani television series
