= Josefin (song) =

Single by Albin Lee Meldau

from the EP Epistlar
- Language: Swedish
- English title: "Josephine"
- Released: 23 April 2021
- Studio: Studio Brun
- Length: 3:41
- Label: Mayfly; Sony
- Songwriters: Albin Lee Meldau; Peter Kvint
- Producer: Peter Kvint

Albin Lee Meldau singles chronology
| "Merry Xmas Everybody" (2020) | "Josefin" (2021) | "Andas" (2021) |

Music video
- "Josefin" on YouTube

"Josefin" (Swedish pronunciation) is a song performed by Swedish singer and songwriter Albin Lee Meldau, who wrote it with the song's producer Peter Kvint. It was released on 23 April 2021 as the lead single from Meldau's EP, Epistlar (2021), through Mayfly and Sony. Two years after its release, it saw a resurgence in popularity thanks to a sped-up version on TikTok, and "Josefin" peaked at number eight on the Swedish singles chart. It has become Meldau's most successful song and has been certified sextuple platinum by IFPI Sverige.

The song also became a hit in Norway in 2023, where three different versions of the song all charted in the top ten of the singles chart: a Norwegian-language version by Delara, a version by influencer Oskar Westerlin created with AI and Meldau's original. In 2024, "Josephine", an English-language translation featuring American singer-songwriter Lissie, was released as a single from Meldau's second English-language studio album, Discomforts.

== Composition ==
Written during the COVID-19 pandemic, "Josefin" was intended as a pastiche of the works by Dutch–Swedish singer-songwriter Cornelis Vreeswijk, and a tribute to the Swedish ballad tradition. Meldau's friend Louise Hoffsten informed him about the Cornelis Vreeswijk prize, which he entered with "Josefin", a love song to a woman named Josefin. Hoffsten and Grant provide background vocals on the song, with Hoffsten also playing the harmonica.

Due to people's efforts to identify the song's subject, Meldau clarified that "Josefin" is a fictional person and not based on anyone specifically. Meldau looked up popular female baby names in Stockholm during the 1980s and narrowed his choices down to three: Sara, Emma and Josefin. He decided against using Sara, due to its rhymes with snara ("to snare") and dödsfara ("mortal danger"), while for Emma, Meldau immediately thought of femma (slang referring to cannabis) due to his past experiences with substance abuse. The song uses the name Josefin due to its ease of rhyming and also its use as a near-homophone of jo, så fin ("yes, so pretty").

== Personnel ==
- Albin Lee Meldau – vocals, songwriting
- Peter Kvint – production, songwriting, recording, mixing
- Caroline Cederlöf – background vocals
- Louise Hoffsten – background vocals, harmonica
- Andreas Dahlbäck – drums
- Hoffe Stanow – mastering

== Charts ==
=== Weekly charts ===
2021–2025 weekly chart performance for "Josefin"
| Chart (2021–2025) | Peak position |
|---|---|
| Norway (VG-lista) | 6 |
| Sweden (Sverigetopplistan) | 8 |
| Sweden (Sverigetopplistan) "Josephine" featuring Lissie | 71 |

=== Year-end charts ===
Year-end chart performance for "Josefin"
| Chart | Year | Position |
|---|---|---|
| Sweden (Sverigetopplistan) | 2021 | 41 |
| Sweden (Sverigetopplistan) | 2022 | 31 |
| Norway (VG-lista) | 2023 | 27 |
| Sweden (Sverigetopplistan) | 2023 | 9 |
| Sweden (Sverigetopplistan) | 2024 | 58 |
| Sweden (Sverigetopplistan) | 2025 | 64 |

== Certifications ==
Certifications for "Josefin"
| Region | Certification | Certified units/sales |
|---|---|---|
| Norway (IFPI Norway) | 2× Platinum | 120,000^{‡} |
Streaming
| Sweden (GLF) | 6× Platinum | 48,000,000^{†} |
^{‡} Sales+streaming figures based on certification alone.^{†} Streaming-only figures based on certification alone.

== Cover versions ==
=== Anna Ternheim version ===
Swedish singer Anna Ternheim covered "Josefin" for the Swedish reality television series Så mycket bättre in 2022.

2022 weekly chart performance for "Josefin"
| Chart (2022) | Peak position |
|---|---|
| Sweden (Sverigetopplistan) | 93 |

=== Delara version ===
Norwegian singer Delara released a Norwegian-language version of "Josefin" after a clip of her covering the song went viral on TikTok in June 2023, prompting her to record a studio version. The song would go on to chart at number two in Norway and number thirty in Sweden.

2023 weekly chart performance for "Josefin"
| Chart (2023–2024) | Peak position |
|---|---|
| Norway (VG-lista) | 2 |
| Sweden (Sverigetopplistan) | 30 |

Year-end chart performance for "Josefin"
| Chart (2023) | Position |
|---|---|
| Norway (VG-lista) | 22 |

Certifications for "Josefin" by Delara
| Region | Certification | Certified units/sales |
|---|---|---|
| Norway (IFPI Norway) | 2× Platinum | 120,000^{‡} |
Streaming
| Sweden (GLF) | Gold | 4,000,000^{†} |
^{‡} Sales+streaming figures based on certification alone.^{†} Streaming-only figures based on certification alone.

=== Oskar Westerlin version ===
In June 2023, Norwegian influencer Oskar Westerlin released a version of "Josefin" created using artificial intelligence (AI), which layers his vocals over Meldau's. Produced by Ballinciaga and PandaPanda, the recording reportedly took five minutes to make. It received negative reviews from critics, with Verdens Gang calling it a "stupid gimmick". Kvint, one of the song's co-writers, also criticised the cover. It charted at number four in Norway and became the first hit song in the country made with the help of AI.

2023 weekly chart performance for "Josefin"
| Chart (2023) | Peak position |
|---|---|
| Norway (VG-lista) | 4 |
