= Justin Bibis =

Pakistani misic duo

- Also known as: Justin Sisters, Justin Girls
- Origin: Lahore, Pakistan
- Genres: Pop
- Years active: 2015-present
- Label: Coke Studio
- Members: Sania Sohail; Muqadas Jandad

Justin Bibis (Urdu: جسٹن بیبیز; translation: "Justin Sisters" or "Justin Girls) is a Pakistani music duo of sisters Sania Sohail and Muqadas Jandad, who found fame as an Internet sensation for their viral video of the song "Baby" by Justin Bieber.

== Early life ==
They were born in Lahore, Pakistan to a poor musician's family and dropped out of education after primary school. Sania said in an interview that they had been singing since childhood and that many family members also sing. They are related to the famous sub-continent singer Reshma, and their family originally migrated from Rajasthan. Other relatives include singers Naseebo Lal, Nooran Lal, and Farah Lal. They know all sorts of Pakistani and Bollywood songs but especially love Justin Bieber songs that touch their hearts. In particular, the song "Baby" is one of their favorites.

== Career ==
The video of the song "Baby" by Justin Bibis was published in February 2015 and it received more than 2 million views. In the video, the two sisters sing the song while in background their mother beats on a pot. They were hence named Justin Bibis.

Justin Bibis were also featured in ICC World Cup 2015 anthem "Phir Se Game Uthadein".

In December 2021, they were announced as one of the performers for the 14th season of Pakistani music show Coke Studio. Their song "Peechay Hutt', was released on 19 February 2022, and featured Hasan Raheem and Talal Qureshi as well.

== Discography ==
=== Singles ===
| No. | Song | Year |
|---|---|---|
| 1. | "Phir Se Game Uthadein" | 2015 |

== See also ==
- List of Pakistani music bands
