= Pakistani comics =

Comics by country

- Earliest publications: 1950s-
- Languages: English; Urdu

Pakistani comics (Urdu: پاکستانی کامکس) are comics or graphic novels originating from Pakistan. They have been publishing for a long time and Pakistani comics creators have gone to produce influential work in the comics industry.

== History ==
After independence, comics are only used for politics and social issues. There was no professional comic artist but cartoonists started making it for newspaper articles.

In 21st century, artists started creating comic books. Some new characters and superheroes arose.

== Notable Pakistani comic book artists ==
Notable Pakistani comic book illustrators and publishers include Nigar Nazar, Farooq Qaiser, Jawed Iqbal, and Yusuf Lodhi.

== Books ==
No.	Book	Writer(s)	Publisher
1	Paasban – The Guardians (2015)	Gauher Aftab	CFx Comics (Creative Frontiers)
2	Zindan: The Last Ansaars (2015)	Omar Mirza; Khurram Methabin	Kachee Goliyan
3	Umru Ayar (2013)	Hasan Ansari	Kachee Goliyan
4	Team Muhafiz (2015)	Imran Azhar	AzCorp
5	Pakistan Man (2013)	Hassan Sohail Siddiqui	HS comics
6	Pakistan Girl (2017)	Hassan Sohail Siddiqui	HS comics
7	Blood Lines (2017)	Mehran Khan	Crucible studios
8	KODA (2015)	Mudassar But	Comic Con Pk
9	Paak Legion (2017)	Umair Najeeb Khan	UNK
10	Karachi but Haunted (2019)	Komal Ashfaq	N/A

== Events ==
- Karachi Comic Con
- Comic Con PK
- ComicCon Lahore
- TwinCon

== See also ==
- Pakistani art
- List of Pakistani artists
