= Talwiinder =

Indian singer-songwriter (born 1997)

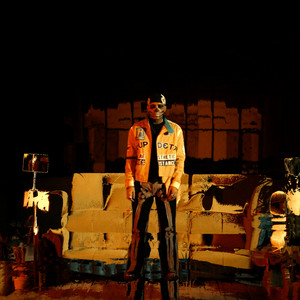
- Talwiinder at a poster shoot (2024)

Background information
- Also known as: Talwiinder
- Born: Talwinder Singh Sidhu; 23 November 1997 (age 28); Tarn Taran Sahib, Punjab, India
- Origin: San Francisco Bay Area, U.S
- Genres: Punjabi, Trap, Synth-Pop, R&B
- Occupations: Singer, Songwriter, Composer
- Instrument: Vocals
- Years active: 2018–present
- Website: talwiinder.com

Talwinder Singh Sidhu (born 23 November 1997), known mononymously as Talwiinder, is an Indian singer, songwriter, and music producer known for Punjabi music. His music often incorporates a blend of electronic sounds, hip-hop, and alternative pop, with experimental elements of trap, lo-fi, boom bap, drill, and synth-pop.

His upbringing in Punjab and San Francisco influenced his music, leading to a fusion of Punjabi and Western sounds. Talwiinder maintains anonymity by using face paint, which he states allows him to keep his private life separate from his public career and live a more normal life.

== Early life ==
Talwinder Singh Sidhu was born on 23 November 1997 in Tarn Taran Sahib, Punjab, to a Punjabi Jat Sikh family He began singing at age one.

At 14, he relocated to the San Francisco Bay Area, where he continued his education and pursued his musical passion.

== Music career ==
Talwiinder began recording and releasing his music on platforms like SoundCloud, Spotify, and YouTube, uploading both original compositions and cover songs such as "Phir Mohabbat" and "Paani Diyaan Challan".

He released his debut EP, You Haven't Heard This, in March 2020 with four original songs.

By 2022, Talwiinder had garnered considerable popularity and cultivated a dedicated fanbase through successful releases like "Kammo Ji", "Dhundhala", and "Funk Song."

He collaborated multiple times with Pakistani singer-songwriter Hasan Raheem on tracks such as "Wishes" and "Tera Chehra". "Wishes," despite its 2023 release, became the second most-streamed song on Spotify in Pakistan in 2024.

His song "Gallan 4" was adapted as "Gallan" for the 2024 film Teri Baaton Mein Aisa Uljha Jiya. Released through T-Series, the song's music video featured Shahid Kapoor and Kriti Sanon.

In August 2024, he released the song "Tu" with T-Series, which featured Bollywood actors Jackie Shroff and Neelam Kothari in its music video. In the same month, he was featured on "High On Me", the third track from Yo Yo Honey Singh's album Glory.

On 4 October 2024, Talwiinder released his debut album, Misfit, which consists of 13 songs and features from various artists. The album was released by Mass Appeal India, a subsidiary of Mass Appeal Records founded by the American rapper Nas.

In April 2025, Talwiinder collaborated with Pakistani artist Afusic on the track "Pal Pal," produced by AliSoomroMusic. The song was subsequently removed from Spotify India in May 2025, following a government advisory that led to the removal of all Pakistani-origin content from Indian digital platforms. This directive was issued in response to national security concerns following the Pahalgam terrorist attack on April 22, 2025.

Talwiinder released his EP, Paiinted Feeliings in October 2026.

== Musical style ==
Talwiinder's experimental approach to music incorporates multiple genres, blending electronic sounds, hip-hop, alternative pop, and R&B with elements of trap, lo-fi, boom bap, drill, and synth-pop.

He has cited artists like Surinder Kaur, Nusrat Fateh Ali Khan, Gurdas Maan and Amrinder Gill as his inspiration. He has also stated that he draws inspiration from western pop and hip-hop artists like Bad Bunny.

His songwriting draws inspiration from his personal life and other influences.

== Tours and live performances ==
Talwiinder's live performances are often praised for his strong singing abilities, which spontaneously engage the audience.

He performed as one of the opening acts for Dua Lipa at the Zomaland Festival in Mumbai on 30 November 2024.

Talwiinder also opened for American rapper G-Eazy during his India tour, which began in February 2024.

He was one of the performing artists at Lollapalooza India 2025, an event headlined by artists such as Shawn Mendes and Green Day.

Talwiinder announced his "Halloween India Tour" on August 31, 2025. The tour covered five Indian cities in October and November, starting in Ludhiana at the Bangr Fest.

== Discography ==
=== Albums and extended plays ===
Title	Track
You Haven't Heard This?	Released: 23 March 2020; Formats: Digital download, streaming
Misfit	Released: 4 October 2024; Formats: Digital download, streaming
Paiinted Feeliings	Released: 30 October 2026; Formats: Digital download, streaming

=== Singles ===
Year	Track name	Artist(s)
2018	Unforgettable	Talwiinder
2018	Dilan De Wich	Talwiinder, Push Kahlon
2018	Tere Jeha	Talwiinder, Push Kahlon
2019	Dila	Talwiinder
2019	Speechless	Twinbearz, Talwiinder, Push Kahlon
2019	Injh Na Kar	Talwiinder
2019	Tera Naam	Talwiinder
2019	Dil Mera	Talwiinder
2020	Dil Te Dimaag	Talwiinder
2020	Gaah	Talwiinder
2020	Save Me	Talwiinder
2020	Gallan 4	Talwiinder
2020	Kammo JI	Talwiinder
2020	Kitaab	Talwiinder, Vision
2020	Samajh Na Aave	Talwiinder, Sneh
2020	Safar	Kidjaywest, Talwiinder
2020	Tell Me	Talwiinder, 30KEY!
2020	Baarish Da Mausam	Talwiinder
2020	No Hezi	Muzzle, Malo on the Beat, Talwiinder
2020	Paj Na	Kidjaywest, Talwiinder, Sneh
2020	Focus	Talwiinder, m,dn,ght, Hasu
2020	Funk Song	Kidjaywest, Talwiinder, Ikath
2020	Together	Talwiinder, Retro Bl,,d
2021	Me & You	Realkdmusic, Talwiinder
2021	Kadd Takk	Hasil, Talwiinder, BHILLA
2021	Jaqeen	Talwiinder, Rish
2021	Tera Saath	Talwiinder, Vylom
2021	Midnight Drive	Talwiinder, Nowhere but Here
2022	Your Eyes	Talwiinder, 30Key!
2022	Be Mine	Talwiinder
2022	Dhundhala	Yashraj, Dropped Out, Talwiinder
2022	Nasha	Talwiinder
2022	Deal 2	INDERZY, Talwiinder
2022	Her	Talwiinder, Sneh, NDS, Rippy Grewal
2022	Soch	Talwiinder, NDS, Harjas Harjaayi
2022	Someone Like Me	Talwiinder, NDS
2022	Bach Ke	Talwiinder, Hasan Raheem, NDS
2023	Sweet Talk	Talwiinder, NDS
2023	Khayaal	Talwiinder, NDS
2023	Baazi	Supreme Sidhu, Talwiinder
2023	Andaaz	Talwiinder, NDS, mxdnxght
2023	You	THEMXXNLIGHT, Talwiinder
2023	Wishes	Hasan Raheem, Talwiinder, Umair
2023	Khoya	Talwiinder, NDS
2023	Conversation	Talwiinder, NDS, Annural Khalid
2023	Anonymous	Talwinder, NDS, Real Boss
2023	Brownskin Hurricane	Talwiinder, Taxsaal, Arsh Heer
2024	Jaam	Talwiinder, TMDA
2024	Heer	Talwiinder, Tech Panda, Kenzani
2024	Agg Banke	Talwiinder, NDS, Harsh Likhari
2024	Gal Kardi	Talwiinder, Tech Panda, Kenzani
2024	Aja	Talwiinder, NDS
2024	Tu	Talwiinder, Sanjoy
2024	DND	Real Boss, Talwiinder, BIG KAY SMG
2024	High On Me	Yo Yo Honey Singh, Talwiinder
2024	Gaani	NDS, Sifr, Talwiinder
2024	The Way You Look	Noor Chahal, Talwiinder, NDS
2025	Haseen	Talwiinder, NDS, Rippy Grewal
2025	FLOWERS	Steel Banglez, Pheelz, Talwiinder
2025	Pal Pal	Afusic, Talwiinder, Alisoomro
2025	Nakhre	Talwiinder, NDS
2025	Panchii	Talwiinder, NDS
2025	Kaaliyan Raatan	Talwiinder, NDS
2025	HOW?	Arsh Heer, Talwiinder, Harnoor, Taxsaal
2025	Kaatilana	Talwiinder, Rippy Grewal, Push Kahlon
2025	Sachay Loki	Meesha Shafi, Talwiinder, Abdullah Siddiqui

=== Soundtracks ===
Year	Title	Song	Music	Lyrics	Co-singer(s)
2024	Teri Baaton Mein Aisa Uljha Jiya	"Gallan"	Himself, NDS, MC Square	Himself, MC Square	MC Square
2025	Tu Meri Main Tera Main Tera Tu Meri	"Tenu Zyada Mohabbat"	Vishal–Shekhar	Kumaar	—N/a
2026	Bait	"Shikaar"	NDS	Himself, Sifr	Sifr
2026	Welcome to the Jungle	"Kyun"	Himself, NDS	Himself	NDS
