= Bayaan =

Bayaan may refer to:

- Bayaan (band), an alternative rock band from Lahore, Pakistan
- Bayaan (film), a 2025 Hindi police procedural drama film
