= Kahani Suno =

Single by Kaifi Khalil
- Language: Urdu
- English title: Kahani Suno
- Released: 18 January 2021 (Original); 31 May 2022 (2.0)
- Genre: R&B; Pakistani pop
- Length: 3:35 (Original); 2:53 (2.0)
- Songwriter: Kaifi Khalil

Kahani Suno (Urdu: کہانی سنو, lit. 'Listen to my story') is a Pakistani Urdu-language song by Kaifi Khalil. It was released on May 31, 2022. The original version of the song was released in 2021. It was reworked and released the following year as Kahani Suno 2.0, gaining widespread popularity and recognition after the song got adapted as the official OST for the 2022 drama serial Mujhe Pyaar Hua Tha (Urdu: مجھے پیار ہوا تھا, lit. 'I fell in love').

== Background and release ==
The song was originally released in January 2021 across various streaming platforms. Khalil decided to revisit the song after it was requested by his Urdu listeners to make a song in Urdu. He stated that he had composed this song a long time ago and some time after releasing the first version, he realized that the song needed revisiting. He elaborated in later interviews: "Kahani Suno was an old song and I decided to rewrite it and do justice to that track. I wanted people to relate to the song as if they are listening to someone’s story.”

"Kahani Suno 2.0" was released on May 31, 2022, along with the music video the following day. It received widespread praise and acclaim across Pakistan and worldwide. The song trended globally and was number 8 on Global Music Video list on YouTube, with 114 million views.
