= Deh Shiva Bar Mohe Eha =

Hymn authored by Guru Gobind Singh

Deh Shiva Bar Mohe Eha ਦੇਹ ਸਿਵਾ ਬਰ ਮੋਹਿ ਇਹੈ
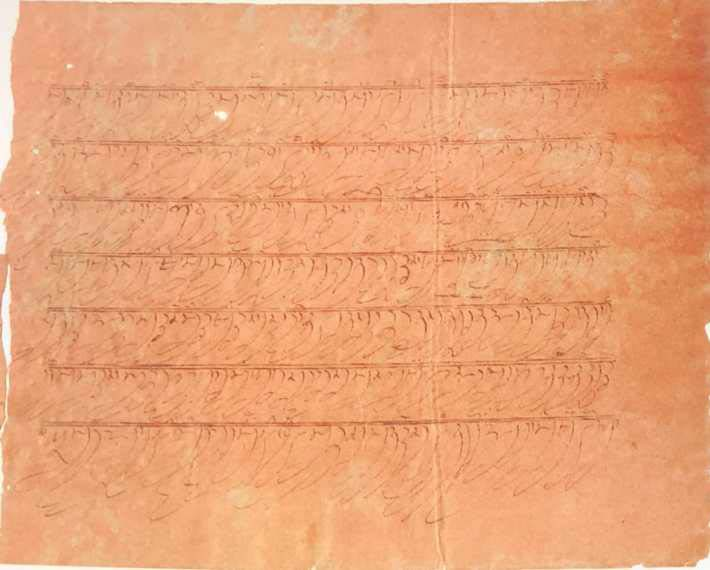
- Deh Shiva Bar Mohe Ehe in the penmenship of Guru Gobind Singh

Information
- Religion: Sikhism
- Author: Guru Gobind Singh

Deh Shiva Bar Mohe Eha (Gurmukhi: ਦੇਹ ਸਿਵਾ ਬਰ ਮੋਹਿ ਇਹੈ) is one of the most celebrated and widely quoted hymns by Guru Gobind Singh.

== History ==
It is taken from the Chandi Charitar Ukati Bilas composition of the Dasam Granth, and is generally understood as being composed by Guru Gobind Singh. It is written in the form of a quatrain or savaiya. Sikh groups have incorporated it as a national anthem for Sikhs. The composition has been interpreted by some, such as Rajinder Sareen, as evidence that the Guru was a Shaiva, but this has been disputed by others, such as Karnail Singh, as a misinterpretation of the meaning of the verses. Karnail Singh also claims that the hymn was written by Shyam, allegedly one of the fifty two poets in the court of the tenth master.

The work is used as a prayer within Sikh schools and the Sikh Regiment of the Indian Army. The composition is also a jaikara (battle cry) for Sikh warriors.

== Translations and transliterations ==
=== Gurmukhi script ===
ਦੇਹ ਸਿਵਾ ਬਰੁ ਮੋਹਿ ਇਹੈ ਸੁਭ ਕਰਮਨ ਤੇ ਕਬਹੂੰ ਨ ਟਰੋਂ ॥

ਨ ਡਰੋਂ ਅਰਿ ਸੋ ਜਬ ਜਾਇ ਲਰੋਂ ਨਿਸਚੈ ਕਰਿ ਅਪੁਨੀ ਜੀਤ ਕਰੋਂ ॥
ਅਰੁ ਸਿਖ ਹੋਂ ਆਪਨੇ ਹੀ ਮਨ ਕੌ ਇਹ ਲਾਲਚ ਹਉ ਗੁਨ ਤਉ ਉਚਰੋਂ ॥

ਜਬ ਆਵ ਕੀ ਅਉਧ ਨਿਦਾਨ ਬਨੈ ਅਤਿ ਹੀ ਰਨ ਮੈ ਤਬ ਜੂਝ ਮਰੋਂ ॥

— ਗੁਰੂ ਗੋਬਿੰਦ ਸਿੰਘ ਜੀ

=== Devanagari script ===
देह शिवा बरु मोहि इहै सुभ (शुभ) करमन ते कबहूँ न टरों ॥

न डरों अरि सो जब जाइ लरों निसचै करि अपुनी जीत करों ॥
अरु सिख हों आपने ही मन कौ इह लालच हउ गुन तउ उचरों ॥

जब आव की अउध निदान बनै अति ही रन मै तब जूझ मरों ॥

— गुरू गोबिंद सिंह जी

=== Shahmukhi script ===
دیہہ شِوا بَرُ موہِ ایہے سُبھ (شُبھ) کَرَمَن تے کَبَہُو نہ ٹَرو؎-

نہ ڈرو اَرِ سو جب جائی لَروں نِسَچَے کَرِ اَپُنی جِیت کَروں ؎۔
اَرُ سِکھ ہوں آپنے ہی من کَو اِیہہ لالَچ ہَؤُ گُن تَؤُ اُچَروں ؎-

جب آوْ کی اَؤدھ نِدان بَنَے اَتِ ہی رَن مَے تب جُجھ مروں ؎۔

— گُرو گوبِند سنگھ جی

=== English translation ===
O Siva, (Epithet for the almighty) give me this boon,

May I never ever shirk from doing good deeds, that I shall not fear when I go into combat. And with determination I will be victorious. That I may teach myself this creed alone, to speak only of Thy (almighty) praises. And when the last days of my life come,

I may die in the might of the battlefield.

— Guru Gobind Singh, Deh Shiva Bar Mohe Eha

=== Latin script ===
Dēh śivā bar[u] moh[i] ihai subh (śubh) karaman tē kabb hu nā ṭarō̃ ॥

Nā ḍarō̃ ar[i] sō jab jāi larō̃ nisachai kar[i] ap[u]nī jīt karō̃ ॥

Ar[u] sikh hō̃ āpanē hī man kau ih lālač ha'u gun ta'u učarō̃ ॥

Jab āv kī a'udh nidān banē at[i] ran mai tab jūjh marō̃ ॥

— Guru Gobind Sī̃ṅgh Jī
