= Teri Mitti =

2019 song by Arko and B Praak from the Indian film Kesari

Song by Arko, B Praak

from the album Kesari Soundtrack
- Language: Hindi
- English title: "Your soil"
- Released: March 15, 2019
- Label: Zee Music
- Composer: Arko Pravo Mukherjee
- Lyricist: Manoj Muntashir

"Teri Mitti" (transl. Your soil) is a patriotic Indian Hindi-language song, written by Manoj Muntashir, composed by Arko Pravo Mukherjee, and sung by singer B Praak. It was released in March 2019 and featured on the soundtrack of the 2019 Hindi film Kesari, starring Akshay Kumar and Parineeti Chopra, who later sang the female version. The aim of the song was to reflect a dying soldier's last thoughts in the film's final scene.

Nominated for best lyrics at the Filmfare Award in February 2020, when the song lost to "Apna Time Aayega" from Gully Boy, Muntashir's disappointment was relayed in a tweet, making headlines in the press in India that month.

On 24 April 2020, with an image of a doctor embracing a map of India, a reprise of the song was released as a tribute to healthcare workers, police and other essential workers during the COVID-19 pandemic in India.

== Kesari (2019) ==
"Teri Mitti" is a patriotic Hindi song which features as a tribute to soldiers on the soundtrack of the 2019 film Kesari, based on the Battle of Saragarhi, which took place in 1897. It was released on 15 March 2019, a week before the launch of the film.

The lyrics were written by Manoj Muntashir, the music composed by Arko Pravo Mukherjee and it was sung by B Praak. According to Mukherjee, also referred to as Arko, they studied the film's scenes prior to first composing the music. Subsequently, Muntashir explained how he filled the composition with words. He later recalled that the aim was to reflect a dying soldier's last thoughts. In writing the lyrics he said in the same dialogue that he kept in mind a reference to Kaifi Azmi's words in "Kar chale hum fida", the sentiments of which Anurag Singh, Kesari's director, intended to re-create. The song plays at the end of the film, in the scene of the final battle. Mukherjee, having previously been responsible for romantic songs, said it was the "most emotional" song he had composed. Following its release, he reported that "Twitter, Instagram were flooded for all three of us. Even Karan Johar was teary-eyed after listening to the song.” The song played high on Indian charts during early 2019. By 22 July 2019, the song video crossed the 100-million views mark on YouTube.

In February 2020, the song made headlines in the press in India when following its nomination for the 2020 Filmfare Award for best lyrics, the song instead lost to "Apna Time Aayega" from Gully Boy. When Muntashir subsequently tweeted his disappointment at the decision, which he said made both himself and millions of Indians cry, he gained support from fans and other lyricists including Neelesh Mishra and Neha Bhasin. The message he tweeted contained a verse from the song itself and a pledge not to attend future award ceremonies;

Dear Awards, even if I try all my life...I won't be able to write a better line than 'Tu Kahti Thee Tera Chaand Hoon Main Aur Chaand Humesha Rahta Hai'. You failed to honor the words which made millions of Indians cry and care for their motherland. It would be a great disrespect to my art if I still continue caring for you. So here I bid you a final good bye. I officially announce- I won't attend any award show till I breathe my last. Alvida.

Following the awards, a surge of Indians were reported to have been searching for "Teri Mitti" on Google. On 22 March 2021, at the 67th National Film Awards, Praak won the award for Best Male Playback Singer for this song.

== Female version (2019) ==
After the film's lead actress Parineeti Chopra was discovered to be constantly humming the theme tune to the film during its promotions, a proposal from music supervisor Azeem Dayani led to the making of "Teri Mitti" in her voice. Accompanied by a video consisting of clips from the film, it took a total of four hours, according to Chopra. This female version was released on 17 April 2019, and was the second of her recordings, the first being Maana Ke Hum Yaar Nahin from the film Meri Pyaari Bindu.

== Reprise (2020) ==
On 23 April 2020, Kumar announced that the original song had inspired a reprise version, in light of recent incidents towards healthcare workers during the COVID-19 pandemic in India and lockdown in India. The new version, Mukherjee later confirmed, was Kumar's planned tribute to doctors and healthcare workers. On the same day, filmmaker Karan Johar, who produced the film, released a teaser to the song, attaching a message that read: "they are fighting to keep us safe and for that, we are forever grateful. A tribute from our hearts to theirs."

The tribute-version was produced with the collaboration of Johar's Dharma Productions and Zee Studios. Muntashir, Mukherjee and Praak returned to write the lyrics, compose the music and perform the song, respectively, and Kumar contributed with a performance in the video. On 24 April, the video was shared by Kumar on Twitter, with the caption "सुना था डॉक्टर्स भगवान का रूप होते है लेकिन कोरोना वायरस की इस लड़ाई में देख भी लिया| #TeriMitti Tribute – an ode to our heroes in white, out now." Different from the original version in Kesari, the lyrics continue on with "Sarhad pe jo wardi khaki thi, ab uska rang safed hua.", translating to "the uniform at borders that was khaki, is white now". The video features images and videos of events captured during the pandemic. After showing footage of attacks on medical staff, the last clip depicts Kumar with the final saying.

Upon its release, actor Hrithik Roshan responded by describing it as "heartfelt". With an image of a doctor embracing a map of India, India.com described it as "magic [that] will leave you teary eyed." On 28 April 2020, the video of the tribute version reached eight million views on YouTube. One police officer in Delhi reacted by reproducing his own version. On 28 April, India Today reported that his video "went viral" and was shared several hundred times shortly after being posted on Facebook. On 29 April, the Indo-Tibetan Border Police recreated their own Teri Mitti-tribute version. With several lines substituted by their officers, their accompanying video included clips of ration distributions to difficult-to-reach areas and women stitching masks.

Pakistani singer Wahab Bugti's rendition of the song, recorded in 2020, went viral in July 2021.
