= Albin Lee Meldau =

Swedish singer, songwriter and musician (born 1988)

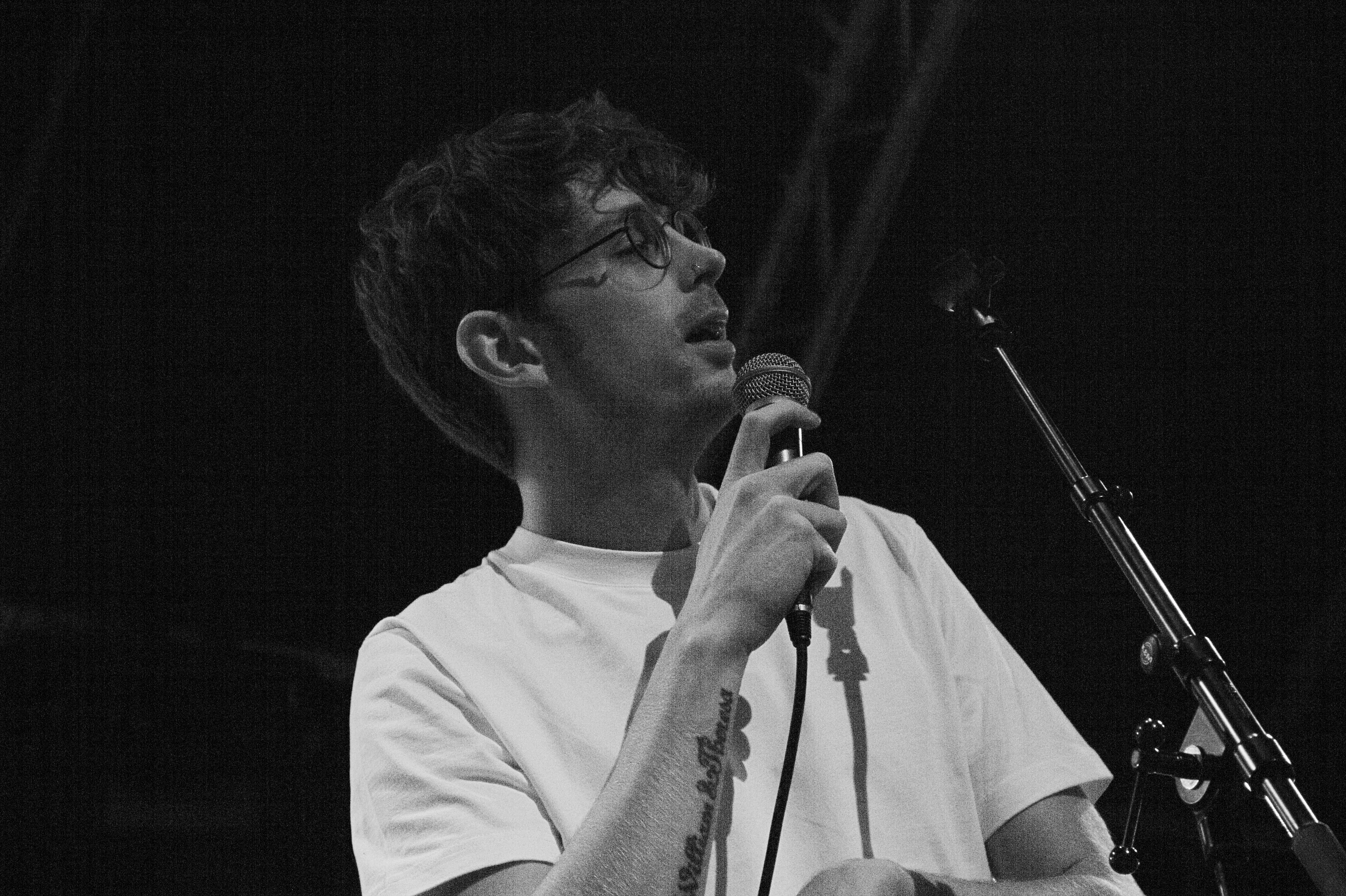

Background information
- Born: 8 February 1988
- Origin: Gothenburg, Sweden
- Genres: Neo-soul; pop; indie
- Years active: 2015–present
- Labels: Astralwerks; Caroline International
- Website: www.albinleemeldau.com

Albin Lee Meldau (born 8 February 1988) is a Swedish singer, songwriter and musician. He self-released his debut EP, Lovers, in 2016 with help from producer Björn Yttling (of Peter Bjorn and John).

Later that year, Albin signed to Astralwerks, who re-released his Lovers EP, and in 2017 released the follow-up Bloodshot EP.

In 2017, Albin was named by NPR Music as one of their must-see artists at that year's SXSW, and featured as part of their Tiny Desk Concert series. NPR Music described his voice as "breathtaking, soulful, thunderous and impossible to ignore".

He was previously part of a band called the Magnolia.

His debut album, About You, was released on 1 June 2018. In 2018, he appeared on Så mycket bättre, which is broadcast on TV4. On 8 May 2020, Meldau released the first EP out of two, called På svenska (Sida A).

== Discography ==
=== Studio albums ===
Title	Details	Peak chart positions
Title	Details	SWE
About You	Released: 1 June 2018; Label: Astralwerks; Format: CD, digital download	2
På svenska	Released: 12 June 2020; Label: Mayfly; Format: LP, CD, digital download	34
Discomforts	Released: 27 September 2024; Label: Mayfly; Format: LP, CD, digital download	14
Min vän och jag (with Arvid Nero)	Released: 14 November 2025; Label: Mayfly; Format: LP, CD, digital download	8

=== Extended plays ===
Title	Details	Peak chart positions
Title	Details	SWE
Lovers	Released: 1 December 2016; Label: Astralwerks	—
Bloodshot	Released: 21 July 2017; Label: Astralwerks	—
Så mycket bättre 2018 – Tolkningarna	Released: 8 December 2018; Label: Sony	20
The Purgatory Sessions	Released: 15 February 2019; Label: Virgin, UMG	—
Merry Little Christmas	Released: 15 November 2019; Label: Mayfly	12
På svenska (Sida A)	Released: 8 May 2020; Label: Mayfly	—
Epistlar	Released: 24 September 2021; Label: Mayfly	29

=== Singles ===
Year	Title	Peak chart positions		Album
Year	Title	SWE	NOR	Album
2016	"Lou Lou"	77	—	Lovers
2017	"Persistence"	—	—	Bloodshot
2017	"Bloodshot"	—	—	Bloodshot
2017	"Same Boat"	—	—	About You
2018	"The Weight Is Gone"	— (Note: "The Weight Is Gone" did not enter the Swedish Singellista Chart, but peaked at number one on the Swedish Heatseeker Chart.)	—	About You
2018	"Before & After"	—	—	About You
2018	"I Need Your Love"	— (Note: "I Need Your Love" did not enter the Swedish Singellista Chart, but peaked at number 11 on the Swedish Heatseeker Chart.)	—	About You
2018	"Bara himlen ser på"	— (Note: "Bara himlen ser på" did not enter the Swedish Singellista Chart, but peaked at number 12 on the Swedish Heatseeker Chart.)	—	Så mycket bättre
2018	"Spela min favoritvals"	44	—	Så mycket bättre
2018	"I Know Something You Don't Know"	81	—	Så mycket bättre
2018	"Kan man älska nån på avstånd"	86	—	Så mycket bättre
2019	"Vita fen" (featuring Stor)	—	—	Non-album singles
2019	"Kom för mig"	—	—	Non-album singles
2019	"Have Yourself a Merry Little Christmas"	73	—	Merry Little Christmas
2020	"På riktigt"	—	—	På svenska
2020	"Från himmelen fallen" (with Louise Hoffsten)	—	—	Försöker hålla om
2020	"Merry Xmas Everybody"	60	—	Non-album single
2021	"Josefin"	8	6	Epistlar
2021	"Andas"	—	—	Epistlar
2021	"Ord som rimmar på dig"	— (Note: "Ord som rimmar på dig" did not enter the Swedish Singellista Chart, but peaked at number 15 on the Swedish Heatseeker Chart.)	—	Epistlar
2021	"Merry Christmas on Your Own" (featuring Grant)	56	—	Non-album single
2022	"Forget About Us"	—	—	Discomforts
2022	"Mamma"	14	—	Non-album singles
2022	"Gör dig glad" (featuring Grant)	35	—	Non-album singles
2022	"Segla på ett moln" (featuring Arvid Nero)	— (Note: "Segla på ett moln" did not enter the Swedish Singellista Chart, but peaked at number five on the Swedish Heatseeker Chart.)	—	Non-album singles
2022	"Kyss!"	— (Note: "Kyss!" did not enter the Swedish Singellista Chart, but peaked at number four on the Swedish Heatseeker Chart.)	—	Non-album singles
2023	"Farväl"	45	—	Non-album singles
2023	"When You're Here"	90	—	Discomforts
2023	"Hold Your Head Up" (featuring Jack Savoretti)	— (Note: "Hold Your Head Up" did not enter the Swedish Singellista Chart, but peaked at number three on the Swedish Heatseeker Chart.)	—	Discomforts
2024	"Elvis, I Love You"	— (Note: "Elvis, I Love You" did not enter the Swedish Singellista Chart, but peaked at number 11 on the Swedish Heatseeker Chart.)	—	Discomforts
2024	"Sinking Like a Stone"	— (Note: "Sinking Like a Stone" did not enter the Swedish Singellista Chart, but peaked at number 13 on the Swedish Heatseeker Chart.)	—	Discomforts
2024	"Misstro" (with Molly Hammar)	98	—	Non-album single
2024	"Josephine" (featuring Lissie)	71	—	Discomforts
2024	"If You Ever Change Your Mind"	— (Note: "If You Ever Change Your Mind" did not enter the Swedish Singellista Chart, but peaked at number one on the Swedish Heatseeker Chart.)	—	Discomforts
2025	"Barfotabarn" (with Arvid Nero)	97	—	Min vän och jag
2025	"Min vän och jag" (with Arvid Nero)	77	—	Min vän och jag
2025	"Julbudskap" (with Arvid Nero)	62	—	Min vän och jag
