= Soch (band) =

Pakistani pop and sufi rock band

Soch سوچ
- Origin: Lahore, Punjab, Pakistan
- Genres: Pop rock; sufi rock
- Years active: 2010–present
- Label: Nescafé Basement
- Members: Adnan Dhool; Rabi Ahmad
- Website: www.sochtheband.com

Soch (Urdu: سوچ) is a pop and sufi rock band from Lahore, Pakistan. It consists of two members – Adnan Dhool (vocals) and Rabi Ahmad (guitars). The band was formed by the lead vocalist Adnan Dhool in 2010. In 2011, the band released their first single "Bandeya".

Soch was featured in Pakistani music television series Nescafe Basement's Season 1 in 2012. Two years later, the band's critically-acclaimed Nescafe Basement single "Awari" was included in the Bollywood movie Ek Villain in 2014.

== History ==
In an interview with ARY Digital, Rabi Ahmed revealed that Dhool was looking for a session player for a concert in 2011. That is when they first met and played for the concert. After the concert, they started meeting on and off. Adnan Dhool later offered Rabi Ahmed to join the band, which he accepted.

The band released the tracks "Awari", "Bol Hu", and "Uth Jawana" through a Pakistani music platform Nescafe Basement under the mentorship of Zulfiqar Jabbar Khan, commonly known as Xulfi.

Bollywood director Mohit Suri featured Soch Band's track "Awari" in his 2014 film Ek Villain. Their song "Bol Hu" was included as the title track in the 2020 film Malang.

Soch has composed music for the several Pakistani films including Sherdil, Chupan Chupai, Dekh Magar Pyaar Se, and Verna.

On 22 October 2021, the band released the music video of single "Tera Deewana" on YouTube, which gained 1 million views within a day. On 9 December 2021, the band was included in the lineup for season 14 of Coke Studio, and their song, "Neray Neray Vas", a collaboration with Butt Brothers, was released on 1 February 2022. On 18 December 2021, they produced Ahmad Taha Ghani's debut track titled "Tu Mil Jaye Tou".

== Discography ==
=== Films ===
| Year | Song | Film |
|---|---|---|
| 2014 | "Awari" | Ek Villain |
| 2015 | "Kala Doriya" | Dekh Magar Pyar Se |
| 2016 | "Zindagi Kitni Haseen Hay" | Zindagi Kitni Haseen Hay |
| 2017 | "Zinda" | Verna |
| 2017 | "Sadqa" | Chupan Chupai |
| 2019 | "Haris Theme, Arun Theme" | Sherdil |
| 2020 | "Bol Hu" | Malang |

=== Drama OSTs ===
| Drama | Song | TV Channel |
|---|---|---|
| Parlour Wali Larki | "Bol Kaffara Kya Hoga" | BOL TV |
| Dil Mom Ka Diya | "Dil Mom Ka Diya OST" | ARY Digital |
| Bay Khudi | "Bay Khudi OST" | ARY Digital |
| Bikhray Moti | "Bikhre Moti OST" | ARY Digital |
| Dushman e Jaan | "Dushman e Jaan OST" | ARY Digital |
| Bharaas | "Bharaas OST" | ARY Digital |
| Deedan | "Deedan OST" | A-Plus |
| Zid | "Zid OST" | Express |
| Team Muhafiz | Team Muhafiz OST "Dil Fatah Karain" | Geo Entertainment |
| Burns Road Kay Romeo Juliet | Burns Road Kay Romeo Juliet OST "Tera Deewana Terey Shehr Mein Hai" | ARY Digital |

=== Jingles ===
| Title | Brand |
|---|---|
| "Kaalay Rang Da Paranda" | Zong |
| "Gaarh De Jhanday" | Jazz |
| "Independence Day Special" | United Bank Limited |
| "Dil Se" | Gul Ahmed |

=== Anthems ===
| Title | Brand |
|---|---|
| "Hum Aik Hain" | Coca-Cola Pakistan |
| "Tak Meday Sohna" | Multan Sultans |
| "Rang Jeet Ka Laal Hai" | Islamabad United |

== Awards and nominations ==
- Best Music Life OK Screen Awards 2014
- Nominated for Best Music Direction IIFA Awards 2015

== See also ==
- List of Pakistani music bands
