= Hasan Raheem =

Pakistani singer (born 1997)

- حسن رحیم
- Born: 2 August 1997 (age 29); Gilgit, Gilgit-Baltistan, Pakistan
- Education: Bahria University (Medical and Dental College)
- Occupations: Singer; songwriter; rapper; medical doctor
- Years active: 2018–present
- Works: Discography
- Spouse: Noor-us-Saba (m. 2025)
- Musical career
- Genres: R&B; hip hop; soul
- Instrument: Guitar

YouTube information
- Channel: @HasanRaheem
- Years active: 2018–present
- Genre: Music
- Subscribers: 480k
- Views: 209 million
- Last updated: 3 September 2025

Hasan Raheem (Note: حسن رحیم) (born 2 August 1997) is a Pakistani singer, songwriter and rapper. He is known for his subtle, laid-back R&B, hip hop styles of music.

== Early life and education ==
Raheem was born on 2 August 1997. He belongs to a Shina family hailing from Gilgit District Astore Village Dishkin (Kabile), located in northern Pakistan's Gilgit-Baltistan region. He is the eldest of four siblings. His father served in the Pakistan Army. Raheem describes himself as a "rebel" child while growing up, who had a taste for music. He received his early education from Generation's School. His first ever on-stage performance was in his fifth grade of school, when he performed a popular dance track by British-Indian musical group RDB.

Raheem moved to Karachi to pursue a career in medicine, graduating from the Bahria Medical and Dental College.

== Career ==
Raheem started writing, recording and releasing singles in 2018 while still in medical school. He began weaving melodies and lyrics together using his semi-acoustic guitar.

His first taste of success came with his single "Aisay Kaisay", released in January 2020. The song made him the flagbearer in Pakistan's indie music scene.

His tracks such as "Joona", "Aarzu", "Sar Phira" and "Sun Le Na" garnered millions of hits on YouTube and he quickly began to be noticed in the Pakistani music scene. In his early days, he collaborated with the Young Stunners.

In 2020, Raheem won the Breakthrough Artist of the Year award for music at the 1st Pakistan International Screen Awards in Dubai.

He made his Coke Studio debut in season 14 in 2022, where he featured in a dance track titled "Peechay Hutt" in collaboration with Talal Qureshi and the Justin Bibis.

He released his first album Nautanki in December 2022. The album was well received by his fans.

He released his much-awaited EP Maybe, It's Love in September 2023. The album consisted some significant features by artists like Talha Yunus, Talha Anjum, Raftaar and Talwiinder. The album was produced by Umair and Shahrukh. "Wishes" featuring Talwiinder became a massive hit in Pakistan, India and several other countries.

On June 21, 2024 Raheem was featured on Indian EDM artist and singer Ritviz's single "Mehrbaan".

== Artistry ==
Raheem's music is mainly R&B, hip hop and indie pop, with influences of soul. He has a free-flowing experimental approach to music with a "soft, mumbling rap-verse style" voice, and his lyrical style has been characterised for its simplicity; according to Raheem, he likes to pour his feelings into his music and prefers to "keep it as simple as possible so that anyone who listens to my songs can connect with them". He is also known for infusing "Gilgiti-inspired dance moves" in his music videos and occasionally incorporates lyrics in his native language, Shina, into his songs.

== Discography ==
=== Studio albums ===
Year	Album	Track Title	Artists
2025	Dil Kay Parday	Dil Kay Parday	Hasan Raheem, Shehryar Khan
2025	Dil Kay Parday	FWM	Hasan Raheem, Shehryar Khan
2025	Dil Kay Parday	Matter	Hasan Raheem, Matt Cohn, Zach Ess
2025	Dil Kay Parday	Aaju Baaju	Hasan Raheem, CGF
2025	Dil Kay Parday	Exes	Hasan Raheem, Talhah Yunus, Talha Anjum
2025	Dil Kay Parday	Post You	Hasan Raheem, Afusic, AliSoomroMusic
2025	Dil Kay Parday	Deewana	Hasan Raheem, Shehryar Khan
2025	Dil Kay Parday	Khoj	Hasan Raheem, Shehryar Khan
2025	Dil Kay Parday	Adakaari	Hasan Raheem, B Ham, Peter Fenn
2025	Dil Kay Parday	Memories	Hasan Raheem, Justin Bibis, Shehryar Khan
2025	Dil Kay Parday	Nashe Me Hun	Hasan Raheem, Sheryar Khan
2025	Dil Kay Parday	No More Care	Hasan Raheem, Varqa Faraid
2025	Dil Kay Parday	Dard	Hasan Raheem, Shamsher Rana
2025	Dil Kay Parday	Leave Me Now (Don't You)	Hasan Raheem, Umair

=== EPs ===
Year	EP	Track	Artist(s)
2021	SHE	Aarzu	Hasan Raheem ft. UMAIR
2021	SHE	Pukaar	Hasan Raheem ft. Rovalio
2021	SHE	Adjust	Hasan Raheem ft. Abdullah Kasumbi
2023	Maybe, It's Love	Khamoshiyaan	Hasan Raheem, Umair, Talha Yunus
2023	Maybe, It's Love	Wishes	Hasan Raheem, Umair, Talwiinder
2023	Maybe, It's Love	Wife You	Hasan Raheem, Umair, Talha Anjum
2023	Maybe, It's Love	Teray Naam	Hasan Raheem, Shahrukh, Raftaar
2023	Maybe, It's Love	Aisa Hi Hun	Hasan Raheem, Umair

=== Singles and collaborations ===
Year	Track	Artist(s)
2018	Paas	Hasan Raheem
2019	Kya Kahun	Hasan Raheem ft. Abdullah Kasumbi
2020	Aisay Kaisay	Hasan Raheem ft. Abdullah Kasumbi
2020	Khayal	Hasan Raheem ft. Abdullah Kasumbi
2020	Saada	Hasan Raheem ft. Abdullah Kasumbi
2020	Manshiyaat	Peach Fuzz ft. Hasan Raheem
2020	Since Eid	Hasan Raheem ft. Abdullah Kasumbi
2020	Normal Life	Turhan James ft. Ansar & Hasan Raheem
2021	Joona	Hasan Raheem ft. Abdullah Kasumbi
2021	PAISA	Talal Qureshi ft. Hasan Raheem
2021	Khona Tha	Hasan Raheem ft. Maanu
2021	Darr	Hasan Raheem ft. RFB
2021	SWEETU	Talal Qureshi, Hasan Raheem & Maanu
2021	OMG	Rozeo ft. Hasan Raheem
2021	Faasla	Shamoon Ismail ft. Hasan Raheem
2021	Wild	Talhah Yunus ft. JJ47 & Hasan Raheem
2021	Terha	Marshall Ahmad & Hasan Raheem
2021	Sar Phira	Hasan Raheem ft. Abdullah Kasumbi
2022	Sun Le Na	Hasan Raheem ft. Abdullah Kasumbi
2022	Peechay Hutt	Hasan Raheem, Justin Bibis & Talal Qureshi
2022	Weli Ho	Hasan Raheem, Abdullah Kasumbi & Talhah Yunus
2022	KYUN	Karakoram & Hasan Raheem
2022	Faltu Pyar	Hasan Raheem, Natasha Noorani & Talal Qureshi
2022	KYUN (Unplugged)	Karakoram & Hasan Raheem
2022	Tu Kahan	UMAIR, Abdullah Maharvi, JANI & Hasan Raheem
2024	Mehrbaan	Hasan Raheem & Ritviz
2024	Zaalima	Hasan Raheem, Abdul Hannan
2024	Make You Mine	Umair ft. Abdul Hannan & Hasan Raheem
2024	Radha	Hasan Raheem Ft. Umair
2024	Maand	Bayaan & Hasan Raheem ft. Rovalio
2025	EXES	Hasan Raheem ft Talhah Yunus, Talha Anjum
2025	Kanwal	Afusic ft. Hasan Raheem
2026	Rangeen	Hasan Raheem, Izz Chughtai, Umair

== In popular culture ==
His song "Peechay Hutt" with Justin Bibis and Talal Qureshi, which was performed on the fourteenth season of Coke Studio was featured in the end credits of Marvel Studios' television series, Ms. Marvel, in the second episode, titled "Crushed".
