= Aima Baig discography =

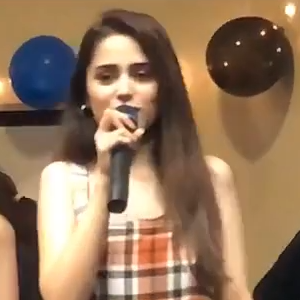
- Baig in 2019
- Coke Studio Pakistan: 10
- Pakistan Super League: 3
- ISPR: 5

Aima Baig is a Pakistani singer, known for her playback singing, collaboration music videos, and cover songs.

== Soundtracks ==
=== Films ===
Year	Song	Title	Music	Notes
2016	"Kalabaaz Dil"	Lahore Se Aagey	Shiraz Uppal	Best Female Singer Award, 2017 (Note: Lux Style Award)
2016	"Befikriyan"	Lahore Se Aagey	Shiraz Uppal	
2016	"Ehle Dil"	Lahore Se Aagey	Shiraz Uppal	
2017	"Balu Mahi"	Balu Mahi	Sahir Ali Bagga	Sang with Asim Azhar
2017	"Kaif o Suroor"	Na Maloom Afraad 2	Shani Arshad	
2017	"Lafzon Main Kharabi Thi"	Verna	Shuja Haider	
2017	"Hone Do"	Arth - The Destination		
2017	"Sadqa"	Chupan Chupai	Adnan Dhool	Best Female Singer Award, 2018
2018	"Yunhi Rastay Mai"	7 Din Mohabbat In	Shuja Haider	Duet with Ali Sethi; lyrics by Piyush Mishra
2018	"Pyar Wyar"	Na Band Na Baraati		
2018	"Item Number"	Teefa in Trouble	Naqash Haider	Duet with Ali Zafar
2018	"Chan Ve"	Teefa in Trouble	Ali Zafar, Naqash Haider	Duet with Ali Zafar
2018	"Sajna Door"	Teefa in Trouble	Ali Zafar, Naqash Haider	Duet with Ali Zafar
2018	"Aya Lariye"	Jawani Phir Nahi Ani 2	Shuja Haider	Co-singers Naeem Abbas Rufi, Shuja Haider
2018	"Be Adab Be Mulahiza"	The Donkey King	Majid Raza, Asrar	Co-singer Asrar
2019	"Ye Aaj Mujh Ko Kya Hua"	Baaji	Recreated by Jamal Rahman	Co-singer Natasha Noorani; recreated from lyrics by Tasleem Fazli and composition by M. Ashraf for 1975 Pakistani film Naukar
2019	"Balma Bhagora"	Parey Hut Love	Azaan Sami Khan	Rap by Ahmad Ali Butt and Sheheryar Munawar
2019	"Kuch To Hua Hai"	Heer Maan Ja	Ahmed Ali	Co-singer Rameez Khalid
2019	"Khawabon Mein"	Kaaf Kangana	Bagga	Lyricist Khalil-ur-Rehman Qamar (Note: By Inter-Services Public Relations (ISPR))
2022	"Loota Rey"	Quaid-e-Azam Zindabad	Shani Arshad	Lyrics by Khwaja Danish; sang with Asrar
2022	"Pretty Face"	Tich Button	Adrian David Emmanuel	Lyrics by Shakeel Sohail; co-singer Jabar Abbas
2022	"Rahain"	Zarrar		
2024	"Saathiya"	Abhi	Jal	Co-singer Goher Mumtaz
2025	"Raat Ke Hain Sayai"	Love Guru	Shani Arshad	

=== Television ===
Year	Song	Title	Music	Notes
2016	"Main Tenu Samjhawan Ki"	Intezaar	Bagga	
2017	"Ishq Aatish Hai"	Ishq Aatish Hai		
2017	"Aitebar"	Love Youn Bhi Hota Hai	Rahill Mirza	Sang with Ehtisham Khan; recreated rendition of Junaid Jamshed's original from the 1993 Vital Signs album Aitebar
2017	"Imam Zamin"	Imam Zamin	Sang with Bagga	Lyrics by Sabir Zafar
2017	"Adhi Gawahi"	Adhi Gawahi	Sang with Naveed Nashad	Lyrics by Mubashir Hasan
2017	"Ek Pagli Hai Ye"	Pagli		Co-singer Asim Azhar
2017	"Aik Thi Rania"	Aik Thi Rania	Nashad	Sang with Ahmed Jahanzeb; lyrics by Mubashir Hasan
2017	"Ye Jag Khudgarz Bara"	Khudgarz	Bagga	
2018	"Shikwa Hai Dard Se"	Zard Zamano Ka Sawera	Written by Speed Of Sound	Duet with Shuja Haider
2018		The Morning Show		ARY News
2018	"Duhaiyan"	Mere Bewafa		Co-singer Aagha Ali
2018	"Allah Hu"	Ehad-e-Ramazan		Recited with Imran Abbas for Express Entertainment Ramazan transmission
2018	"Romeo Heer"	Romeo Weds Heer	Bagga (also co-singer)	
2019	"Ja Tujhe Maaf Kiya"	Do Bol	Nashad	Lyrics by Nashad and Imran Raza; co-singer Nabeel Shaukat Ali
2019	"Yaarian"	Ehd-e-Wafa	Bagga (co-singers ft. Ali Zafar, Asim Azhar and Baig)	Lyrics by Imran Raza (Note: Compiled in 2020 album Dhanak Kay Rang)
2020	"Raaz-e-Ulfat"	Raaz-e-Ulfat	Sang with Shani Arshad	Lyrics by Sabir Zafar
2020	"Dil Tera Hogaya"	Dil Tera Hogaya (Telefilm)	Nashad	Lyrics by Qamar Nashad; sang with Ali Tariq
2020	"O Zalim"	Fitrat	Sang with Bagga	Lyrics by M. Mujtaba
2021	"Koi Aisa Dard"	Fitoor	Sang with Shani Arshad	Lyrics by Sabir Zafar
2021	"O Meherban Shukriya"	Banno	Sang with Bagga	Lyrics by M. Mujtaba
2021	"Amanat Ho"	Amanat	Nashad	Lyrics by Qamar Nashad; sang with Nabeel Shaukat Ali
2022	"Khata"	Chauraha	Sang with Shani Arshad	Lyrics by Sabir Zafar
2022	"Ik Hook"	Hook	Qasim Azhar	Lyrics by Fatima Najeeb, sang with Zain Zohaib
2024	"Cha Jaa"	Planet Champs	Sang with Haroon	

== Singles ==
=== Coke Studio ===
Year	Season	Song	Lyrics	Music	Co-singer(s)
2017	10	"Qaumi Taranah"	Hafeez Jalandhari	Strings; originally composed by Ahmed Ghulam Ali Chagla	Season's ft. artists
2017	10	"Baazi"	Asim Raza	Sahir Ali Bagga	
2017	10	"Kaatay Na Katay"	Saifuddin Saif	Ali Hamza	Humera Arshad, Rachel Viccaji
2017	10	"Baanware"	Syed Raza Tirmazi	Shuja Haider	
2018	11	"Hum Dekhenge"		Ali Hamza, Zohaib Kazi	Season's ft. artists
2018	11	"Aatish"	Shuja Haider		
2018	11	"Malang"	Imran Raza (traditional folk)	Sahir Ali Bagga	
2018	11	"Ballay Ballay"	Abrar-ul-Haq (traditional folk)		
2019	12	"Dhola"	Sahir Ali Bagga	Rohail Hyatt	Sahir Ali Bagga
2019	12	"Heeray"	Javed Ali Khan	Rohail Hyatt	Rahat Fateh Ali Khan

=== Patriotic songs ===
Year	Song	Notes
2015	"Nane Hathon Me Qalam"	Tribute to the victims of 2014 Peshawar school massacre, composed by Bagga
2018	"Sab Pakistani Milte Hein"	Defence Day song with Sahir Ali Bagga and Shafqat Amanat Ali
2019	"Safai Anthem"	Duet with Asim Azhar, music by Shuja Haider
2021	"Aik Qaum, Aik Manzil"	Pakistan Day song, with Ali Zafar

=== Sports songs ===
Year	Song	Notes
2018	"Agae Shaan Se Hum"	2018 Quetta Gladiators season with Faakhir Mehmood
2020	"Khel Ja Dil Se"	Sang with Fawad Khan and others under Xulfi's composition; for cricket by Pepsi
2020	"Mai Hoon Sitara"	Sang with Asim Azhar; Anthem for Pakistan's first Sports Awards
2021	"Groove Mera"	#HBLPSL6 anthem with Naseebo Lal and Young Stunners; Lyrics by Adnan Dhool, Composed by Xulfi
2022	"Agay Dekh"	#HBLPSL7 anthem with Atif Aslam; produced and composed by Abdullah Siddiqui; sponsored by TikTok
2022	"Game Strong Hai"	Written, composed and produced by Bilal Saeed; video directed by Yasir Jaswal; for PUBG Mobile
2022	"Khelo Aazadi Se"	2022 Kashmir Premier League anthem with Bagga
2024	"Khul Ke Khel"	#HBLPSL9 anthem with Ali Zafar
2025	"The Journey Home"	2025 Peshawar Zalmi season anthem with Bilaal Avaz and Wajid Layaq
2026	"Khelenge Beat Pe"	#HBLPSL11 anthem with Atif Aslam, Sabri Sisters, and Daniya Kanwal; sponsored by Pepsi

=== Collaborations and other singles ===
Year	Song	Notes
2018	"Teriyaan"	Duet with Asim Azhar
2018	"Mein Bhi"	Rendition by Shehzad Roy ft. various artists; anthem at 17th Lux Style Awards
2019	"Aey Zindagi"	
2020	"Te Quiero"	Duet with Haadi Uppal
2020	"Sao Banjara"	Duet with Imran Saeed of Grehan Band; produced by Fahad Hussayn
2020	"Te Quiero Mucho"	Award for Singer of the Year (Jury), PISA 2021 (Note: Velo Sound Station)
2020	"Bijli"	
2020	"Be Myself"	Duet with Abdullah Siddiqui
2021	"Ve Mahiya"	Duet with Ali Zafar; written by Hassan Badshah, music video by Adnan Qazi
2021	"Na Cher Malangaan Nu"	Written, composed and produced by Bilal Saeed, duet with Farhan Saeed; music video directed by Adnan Qazi as inspiration from Taylor Swift's "Wildest Dreams"
2021	"Sitaray Sitaray"	Directed by Bilal Maqsood, sang with Asim Azhar, Uzair Jaswal, Natasha Baig and Young Stunners
2021	"Tu Mera Na Hua"	Bisconni Music Season 2
2022	"Sohna Tu"	Taha Malik ft. Aima Baig, HYDR, Javed Bashir, Rozeo
2022	"Rent Free"	Collaborated with Taha G
2023	"Washmallay"	Traditional Balochi folk rendition with Bagga
2023	"Satrangi"	Written and composed with Qamar Nashad and Naveed Nashad, respectively Most Stylish Singer Award, 2025
2023	"Funkari"	
2024	"Long Time"	
2024	"Millions Ka Daur"	2024 Hum Style Awards anthem with Adnan Dhool and Faris Shafi
2025	"Sun Mere Mahiya"	
2026	"Na Tumse Zyaada"	
2026	"Har Saal"	With Goher Mumtaz
2026	"Dunya Bhula Ke"	Performed with Raafay Israr

=== TV commercials ===
Year	Song	Notes
2015	"The Bonfire Song"	7up
2018	"Maggi"	Duet with Asim Azhar for Maggi
2018	"Bannay"	Mezan cooking oil and Banaspati
2018	"Nova Song"	Huawei Mobile Pakistan
2019	"Light & Glow"	Golden Pearl Light & Glow Fairness Cream
2020	"Maula Mere"	Sang with Sajjad Ali; by Pepsi
2020	"Mitti Ke Sau Rung"	Produced by Xulfi for Glow & Lovely
2021	"Deewane"	For designer Ansab Jahangir, ft. Ayeza Khan and others
2021	"Level Up Your Hair"	Kala Kola hair color
2021	"Stunner"	Sang with Young Stunners for Infinix Mobile NOTE 11

=== Covers and tributes ===
She has covered a few songs while used to be in Mazaaq Raat, otherwise mentioned.

- "Ye Ikram Hai Mustafa Par Khuda Ka" (at 2013 Naat Competition, Dunya News)
- "Summer Wine" (with Mubasher Lucman)
- "Jag Ghoomeya"
- "Bulleya" (Ae Dil Hai Mushkil)
- "Laung Gawacha" (Musarrat Nazir)
- "Aye Rah-e-Haq Ke Shaheedon"
- "Chura Liya Hai Tumne" (Yaadon Ki Baaraat)
- "Sajania" (Masty)
- "Cheap Thrills"
- "Hasi" (Hamari Adhuri Kahani)
- "Dilbar Jani" (Noor Jehan)
- "Mujhe Dil Se Na Bhulana" (Aina)
- "Mera Bichraa Yaar" (Dhaani)
- "Balam Pichkari"
- "Younhi" (with Atif Aslam at 16th Lux Style Awards)
- "Baazi" (solo)
- "Item Number" (solo)
- "Disco Deewane" (with Shuja Haider at #HBLPSL4 opening ceremony)
- "Dosti" (from Hotline; at #HBLPSL4 closing ceremony)
- "Kahani Suno 2.0" (original by Kaifi Khalil)
- "Qaumi Taranah" (at #HBLPSL8 opening ceremony)
- "Tere Hawale" x "Akhiyaan Milawanga" x "Apna Bana Le" (2023)
- "Jinde Meriye" x "Satranga" x "Pehlay Bhi Main" (2024)
- "Number One Girl" (2025)
- "Taaj" (2025; originally performed by Jai Dhir)
- "Tajdar-e-Haram" (2026)

== See also ==
- Ali Zafar discography
- Sahir Ali Bagga discography

== Extra notes ==
Key
†	Denotes song or film that has not been released yet
