= Tera Woh Pyar (disambiguation) =

"Tera Woh Pyar" (transl. That love of you) may refer to:

- Tera Woh Pyar, CokeStudio9 song by Asim Azhar and Momina Mustehsan
- Tera Woh Pyar, a TV programme on Hum Sitaray
