= Sab Sitaray Humaray =

2023 Pakistan Super League official anthem

- Anthem cover

Promotional single by various artists
- Language: Urdu
- Released: 11 February 2023
- Recorded: 2023
- Genre: Stadium anthem
- Length: 3:14
- Label: HBL Pakistan
- Composer: Abdullah Siddiqui
- Lyricists: Asim Azhar; Faris Shafi; Hassan Ali; Raamis Ali; Abdullah Siddiqui
- Producer: Abdullah Siddiqui

Pakistan Super League anthems chronology
"Agay Dekh" (2022)	"Sab Sitaray Humaray" (2023)	"Khul Ke Khel" (2024)

"Sab Sitaray Humaray" (Urdu: سب ستارے ہمارے, lit. 'We Own Every Star') is a 2023 song, produced and composed by Abdullah Siddiqui, and performed by Shae Gill and Asim Azhar, with rap by Faris Shafi. It served as the official anthem of the eighth season of the Pakistan Super League.

== Background and release ==
On 7 February 2023, the PCB announced that Asim Azhar, Shae Gill and Faris Shafi would be singing the anthem for the season and Abdullah Siddiqui would be producing it. This was Azhar's second PSL anthem after "Tayyar Hain" and Siddiqui's second production after "Agay Dekh".

It was earlier reported that Ali Sethi was set for the anthem, after "Pasoori", his duet with Gill in Coke Studio, was largely appreciated. However, his contract was revoked due to possible conflict of interest as his father, Najam Sethi, became PCB's chairman.

It was released on 11 February 2023, with music video directed by Awais Gohar. The music video features players, including Babar Azam, Haris Rauf, Imad Wasim, Shaheen Afridi, Sarfaraz Ahmed, Shadab Khan, and Shahnawaz Dhani.

== Opening ceremony ==
Multan Cricket Stadium hosted the opening ceremony for the first time, with management by Multan Waste Management Company (MCMW). Along with the virtual reality, the ceremony also featured augmented reality and drone art for the first time.

Aima Baig opened with "Qaumi Taranah", followed by Muhammad Aurangzeb, CEO HBL Pakistan, and Najam Sethi addressing the audience. Then Sahir Ali Bagga performed along with Baig, followed by a performance by dance group named The Colony. Afterwards, the anthem was played with Gill, Azhar, and Shafi on-stage, and the ceremony was closed with the fireworks.

== Reception ==
Upon release, Sarah B. Haider reported in Arab News that the anthem left "fans divided" on social media, with several expressing "disappointment". BBC Urdu reported that Ali Zafar's name started trending on Twitter as fans remembered his previous PSL anthems. However, Zafar called to respect these singers and the song. Omair Alavi reported in VOA Urdu that the anthem was receiving mix reactions on social media, while Dawn Images summed up some fan tweets and concluded that Shae Gill "might be the saving grace".

Cricket journalist Qadir Khawaja conducted an online poll for the anthem's review with "good", "average", "below average", and "pathetic"; each of these had almost equal votes, however, Khawaja himself noted it to be "below average". Arfa Feroz called it "turned out disappointing after so much patience". A reviewer in Dawn appreciated all the singers and called it "a nice little peppy track". Manahil Tahira of The Express Tribune called it "a bigger letdown" for the "cricket enthusiasts" and the "respective fans" of the anthem's artists.

Taniya Hasan commented in Dawn Aurora that the music video's cinematography seems to be inspired by Diriliş: Ertuğrul and Game of Thrones, while noted the beat to be "catchy". Maheen Sabeeh appreciated the video director for making "the song look stronger than it is through a killer music video", in her review in The News. Saleem Khaliq of Express News reported that the production of the anthem cost around Rs. 4.5 crore, while about Rs. 25 crore were spent on the opening ceremony.

In later years, Ahmer Naqvi of Dunya Digital and Ali A. Rizvi of The Jungle Today compared this anthem with the PSL's other anthems, and criticised its execution by noting the wrongly collaborating multiple artists from different genres.

== See also ==
External media

Audio
- Full Audio on YouTube

Video
- Music video on YouTube
- Opening Ceremony Performance on YouTube

- List of Pakistan Super League anthems
