= Sahir Ali Bagga discography =

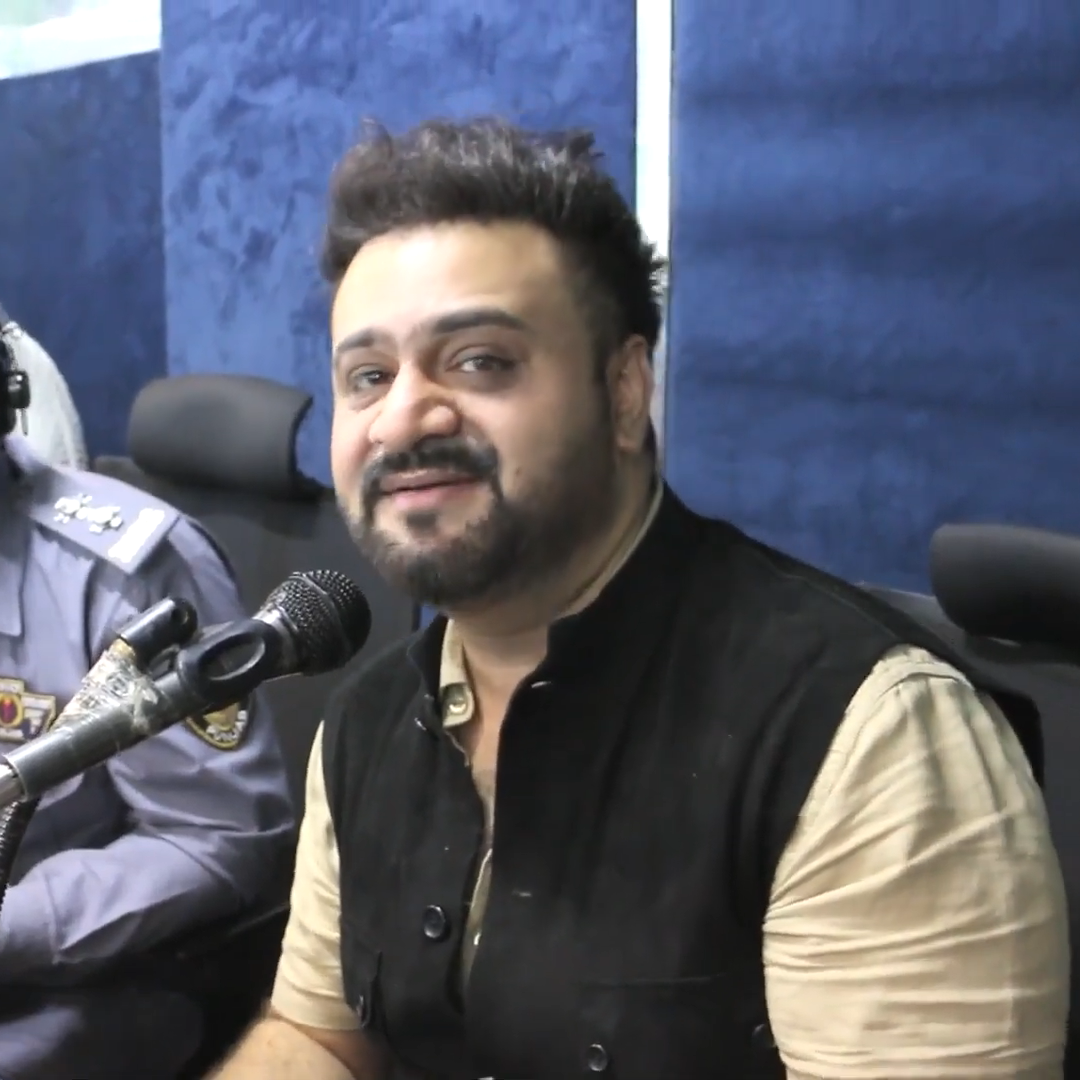
- Bagga in 2019
- Soundtrack albums: 4

Sahir Ali Bagga is a Pakistani singer, music director and composer from Lahore. This is his discography.

== Albums ==
Bagga has worked on the following albums throughout his career.

Year	Details	Songs
2010	Virsa	1. Mein Tenu Samjhaawan Ki
2011	Dharkan	1. Bhigi Bhigi Ration Me - Shahida Mini; 2. Chandni Raatain Taaron Sey Karein Baatain - Shahida Mini; 3. Morey Nain Re Jagey Rein - Shahida Mini; 4. Gidha Yachi Mainu Nach Layn De - Shahida Mini; 5. Ishaq Nahlaya Takade Rehavay - Shahida Mini; 6. Kangna Zulfaan De Vehre Baike - Shahida Mini; 7. Teray Bin Jiya Laage Na - Shahida Mini; 8. Mehka Sama (Hum Hain Deewane) - Shahida Mini; 9. Sajna Ve Mainu Teri - Shahida Mini; 10. Saso Mangay Kukdiyo Mai - Shahida Mini; 11. Saanwarey (Tore Bin Jiya Jaye) - Shahida Mini; 12. Dulhaniyaa Ko Lene Piya - Shahida Mini; 13. Pakistani Ek Duje Ke Diljani - Shahida Mini; 14. Main Teriyaan Dholana Main Teri - Shahida Mini; 15. Maikhana Ki Hasake Ek Pal - Shahida Mini; 16. Mast Qalandar Sakhi Shahbaz Qalandar - Shahida Mini
2012	Aaj Rung Hey	1. Ya Nabi Labe Gibrail Se - Imran Aziz Mian; 2. Aaj Rung Hey Mere Mehbub - Imran Aziz Mian; 3. Nee Mein Jana Jogi De Naal - Imran Aziz Mian; 4. Bhullia (Tamam Daftar E Hiqmat) - Imran Aziz Mian; 5. Sanwarya Rain Bina Sab - Imran Aziz Mian; 6. Deed Teri Mere Dilda - Imran Aziz Mian; 7. Akh Lar Gai Yaar Na - Imran Aziz Mian; 8. Mun Kunto Maula Fahaza Ali
2012	Kaisa Yeh Jadoo Hai	1. Kaisey Jiyon Main Sanam - Uzma; 2. Main Ki Karaan Hu - Uzma; 3. Gori Kay Peeley Hath - Uzma; 4. Kaisa Jadoo Hai Teri - Uzma; 5. Na Ankhian Chorain Mere Dil - Uzma; 6. Chah Key Na Jiween - Uzma; 7. Channa Wey Terey Warga - Uzma; 8. Nachna Nachna Tere Nal - Uzma; 9. Main Tey Rehna Tere Naal - Uzma; 10. Allah Terey Naam Maula - Uzma

- Compilation album: Dhanak Kay Rang (2020)

== Soundtracks ==
=== Pakistani TV serials ===
Year	Title	Song	Music	Singer
2011	Jeena To Hai	Jeena To Hai	Himself	Solo
2011	Kuch Khawab Thay Mere	Kuch Khawab Thay Mere	Himself	Solo
2014	Dil Ka Darwaaza	Dil Ka Darwaaza	Himself	Solo co singer kj
2014	Shehr e Yaraan	Shehr e Yaraan	Himself	singer Hilal Saleem
2014	Soteli	Soteli	Himself	Solo
2014	Jab We Wed	Jab We Wed	Himself	Solo
2014	Ranj e Ashnai	Ranj e Ashnai	Himself	co-singer Fariha Pervez
2014	Shareek-e-Hayat	Shareekh-E-Hayat	Himself	solo
2014	Apni Kahani Kaisay Kahein	Apni Kahani Kaisay Kahain	Himself	singer Asif Ali Santoo
2014	Laa	Laa	Himself	Javed Bashir
2015	Alvida	Alvida Aey Dil	Himself	Shafqat Amanat Ali
2015	Ishqaaway	Ishqaaway	Himself	Rahat Fateh Ali Khan
2015	Jugnoo	Jugnoo Jugnoo	Himself	solo
2016	Tum Kon Piya	Tum Kon Piya	Himself	Rahat Fateh Ali Khan
2016	Intezaar	Samjhawan	Himself	Co-SingerAima Baig
2016	Sang-e-Mar Mar	Sang-e-Mar Mar Ka Dil	Himself	Rahat Fateh Ali Khan
2017	Khaali Haath	Kahan Jaye Yeh Dil	Himself	solo
2017	Mohabbat Tumse Nafrat Hai	Mohabat Ki Kahani Main	Himself	Rahat Fateh Ali Khan
2017	Dil-e-Nadaan	Dil-e-Nadaan	Himself	
2017	O Rangreza	Mohe Apne Hi Rang Mein	Himself	co-singer Sajal Aly
2017	Lekin	Lekin	Himself	co-singer Shafqat Amanat Ali
2017	Iltija	Iltija O Rabba	Himself	singer Sunny Javaid
2017	Khudgharz	Yeh Jag Khudhgarz Bada	Himself	co-singer Aima Baig
2017	Imam Zamin	Imam Zamin	Himself	co-singer Aima Baig
2017	Titli	Jeevan Rakha Hua	Himself	solo
2017	Khaani	Kaisa Yeh Dard Hai	Himself	Rahat Fateh Ali Khan
2018	Tohmat	Tohmat	Himself	co-singer Maria Mir
2018	Mera Khuda Jane	Haaye Rabba	Himself	solo
2018	Parchayee	Ishq Toh Lazawal Hota Hai	Himself	solo
2018	Tum Se Hi Talluq Hai	Wafa Nibha Lenge	Himself	solo
2018	Zun Mureed	Mein Woh Duniyaa Jahan Teri	Himself	solo
2018	Tu Jo Nahi	Tu Jo Nahi	Himself	co-singer Beena Khan
2018	Ghar Titli Ka Par	Aye Meray Khuda	Himself	Solo
2018	Ishq Muhalla	Ishq Muhalla	Himself	Solo
2018	Baandi	Maaye Ni Maaye Dekh Tu	Himself	co-singer Beena Khan
2018	Siskiyan	Siskiyan	Himself	solo
2018	Romeo Weds Heer	Mein Tera Romeo	Himself	co-singer Aima Baig
2018	Seerat	Sadda Rab Waris	Himself	solo
2018	Aye Dil Tu Bata	Aye Dil Tu Bata	Himself	solo
2019	Anaa	Pyaar Hai Tumsay Magar	Himself	co-singer Hania Amir
2019	Deewar-e-Shab	Kya Hai Ishq	Himself	Co-Singer Manwa Sisters
2019	Piya Naam Ka Diya	Piya Naam Ka Diya	Himself	solo
2019	Bharosa Pyar Tera	Bharosa Pyar Tera	Himself	solo
2019	Darr Khuda Say	Aankhoon Main Aansoo	Himself	solo
2019	Kahin Deep Jaley	Kahin Deep Jaley	Himself	solo
2019	Ehd-e-Wafa	Ehd e wafa	Himself	With Ali Zafar, Asim Azhar & Aima Baig
2021	Mohlat	Mohlat		Siraj ul Haq
2024	Jaan Nisar	Tujhe Ishq ho		Solo
2025	My Dear Cinderella	My Dear Cinderella OST	OST	Composer and Lyricist with Ali Zafar and Afshan Fawad
2025	Ishq Di Chashni	Ho Gaya Hai Ishq	OST	Qirat Haider
2026	Mitti De Baway	Paar Channah De	OST	Composer with Arif Lohar and Saleema Khawaja

=== Pakistan film industry ===
Year	Film	Ref
2013	Zinda Bhaag	
2014	Tamanna	
2014	Dukhtar	
2015	Halla Gulla	
2015	Jawani Phir Nahi Ani	
2016	Hijrat	
2016	Maalik	
2016	Sikander	
2016	Balu Mahi	
2016	Jeewan Hathi	
2017	Arth - The Destination	
2018	Wajood	
2018	Azaadi-e-Pakistan	
2019	Kaaf Kangana	

=== Bollywood ===
Year	Song	Film	Composer	Lyricist	Co-singer(s)
2013	"Chugliyaan"	Once Upon ay Time in Mumbai Dobaara!	Pritam	Rajat Arora	Javed Ali

== Singles ==
=== Pakistani ===
Year	Song	Co-singer	Notes
2016	"Pakistan Jiya Hai"	Rahat Fateh Ali Khan	2016 Defence Day
2019	"Pakistan Zindabad"	Solo	
2020	"Kashmir Hun Main"	Solo	Kashmir Solidarity Day
2021	"Badnamiyan"	Alizeh Shah	

=== Coke Studio (Pakistan) ===
Year	Season	Song	Music director	Co-singer
2017	10	"Baazi"	Sahir Ali Bagga	Aima Baig
2018	11	"Malang"	Sahir Ali Bagga	Aima Baig
2018	11	"Roye Roye"	Sahir Ali Bagga	Momina Mustehsan
2019	12	"Dhola"	Sahir Ali Bagga	Aima Baig

== See also ==
- Atif Aslam discography
- Ali Zafar discography
- Rahat Fateh Ali Khan discography
- Aima Baig discography
