= Khelo Aazadi Se =

2022 Kashmir Premier League anthem

Song by Sahir Ali Bagga, Aima Baig
- English title: "Play Freely"
- Released: 29 July 2022
- Recorded: 2022
- Length: 3:29

Kashmir Premier League anthems chronology
| "The Aazadi Anthem" (2021) | "Khelo Aazadi Se" (2022) |

"Khelo Aazadi Se" (Urdu: "کھیلو آزادی سے", lit. 'Play with Freedom') was the official anthem of the 2022 Kashmir Premier League, the second season of the Kashmir Premier League held in Azad Jammu and Kashmir. It was sung by Sahir Ali Bagga and Aima Baig, the official singers for the 2022 KPL. It featured cricketers Azam Khan, Kamran Akmal, Shahid Afridi, Sharjeel Khan and Shoaib Malik.

== Release ==
The song was released via YouTube and received over 80,000 views. The 2022 KPL was promoted using the hashtag #KheloAazadiSe.

== See also ==
- Sahir Ali Bagga discography
- Aima Baig discography
