= 2018 AFC Futsal Club Championship squads =

The 2018 AFC Futsal Club Championship was an international futsal tournament held in Indonesia from 1 to 12 August 2018. The 16 clubs involved in the tournament were required to register a squad of 14 players, minimum two of whom must be goalkeepers (Regulations Articles 30.1 and 30.2). Only players in these squads were eligible to take part in the tournament.

The position listed for each player is per the squad list in the official match reports by the AFC. The age listed for each player is on 1 August 2018, the first day of the tournament. Flags indicate national team as defined under FIFA eligibility rules. Players may hold more than one non-FIFA nationality. A flag is included for coaches that are of a different nationality than their own national team.

== Group A ==
=== Vamos Mataram ===
Manager: (Iran) Reza Falahzadeh

Note: Flags indicate national team as defined under FIFA eligibility rules; some limited exceptions apply. Players may hold more than one non-FIFA nationality.

No.	Pos.	Nation	Player
1	GK	IDN	Nizar Nayaruddin
2	FW	IDN	Al Fajri Zikri
3	MF	IDN	Fachri Deriantama
4	DF	IDN	Adolfo Yembise
5	DF	IDN	Bagus Himawan
6	GK	IDN	Gora Wahyu Saputra
7	MF	IDN	Anzar

No.	Pos.	Nation	Player
8	MF	IDN	Dennis Bawana
9	FW	IDN	Syahidansyah Lubis
10	MF	IDN	Nandi Sumawijaya
11	MF	IDN	Jumadil Muzaik
12	GK	IRN	Mostafa Nazari
13	MF	IDN	Iqbal Aliefian
14	MF	IDN	Marvin Wossiry

=== Nagoya Oceans ===
Manager: (Portugal) Pedro Costa

Note: Flags indicate national team as defined under FIFA eligibility rules; some limited exceptions apply. Players may hold more than one non-FIFA nationality.

No.	Pos.	Nation	Player
1	GK	JPN	Ryuma Shinoda
2	GK	JPN	Yushi Sekiguchi
3	FP	JPN	Tomoki Yoshikawa
4	FP	JPN	Rafael Sakai
5	FP	JPN	Ryuta Hoshi
6	FP	JPN	Shota Hoshi
7	FP	JPN	Ryohei Ando

No.	Pos.	Nation	Player
8	FP	JPN	Masataka Takami
9	FP	JPN	Neto Hirata
10	FP	JPN	Kiyoto Yagi
11	FP	BRA	Luizinho
12	FP	JPN	Koichi Saito
13	FP	JPN	Masaya Hashimoto
14	FP	JPN	Ryosuke Nishitani

=== Dalian Yuan Dynasty ===
Manager: Li Jianlei

Note: Flags indicate national team as defined under FIFA eligibility rules; some limited exceptions apply. Players may hold more than one non-FIFA nationality.

No.	Pos.	Nation	Player
1	GK	CHN	Feng Xiaoyu
2	GK	CHN	Zhou Fan
3	FP	CHN	Ma Liqiang
4	FP	CHN	Zhang Wen
5	FP	CHN	Li Zhiheng
6	FP	CHN	Shen Siming
7	FP	CHN	Zhao Liang

No.	Pos.	Nation	Player
8	FP	CHN	Wang Hongwei
9	FP	CHN	Wang Jiahao
10	FP	BRA	Diogo
11	FP	CHN	Lin Yuchen
12	FP	CHN	Pan Zhongdi
13	FP	CHN	Hu Jie
14	FP	CHN	Peng Boyao

=== Victoria University College ===
Manager: Htay Myint

Note: Flags indicate national team as defined under FIFA eligibility rules; some limited exceptions apply. Players may hold more than one non-FIFA nationality.

No.	Pos.	Nation	Player
1	GK	MYA	Min Min Thein
2	FP	MYA	Sithu Aung
3	FP	MYA	Naing Lin Tun Kyaw
4	FP	MYA	Nyi Nyi San
5	FP	MYA	Wai Zin Oo
6	FP	MYA	Soe Lin Htet
7	FP	MYA	Kaung Zaw Htet

No.	Pos.	Nation	Player
8	FP	MYA	Myo Myint Soe
9	FP	MYA	Sai Pyone Aung
10	FP	MYA	Thiha Soe
11	FP	MYA	Nyein Min Soe
12	GK	MYA	Zaw Myo Htike
13	FP	MYA	Aung Zin Oo
14	FP	MYA	Zaw Zaw Htun

== Group B ==
=== Thái Sơn Nam ===
Manager: (Spain) Miguel Rodrigo

Note: Flags indicate national team as defined under FIFA eligibility rules; some limited exceptions apply. Players may hold more than one non-FIFA nationality.

No.	Pos.	Nation	Player
1	GK	VIE	Nguyễn Văn Huy
2	GK	VIE	Hồ Văn Ý
3	MF	VIE	Châu Đoàn Phát
4	DF	EQG	Roberto Tobe
5	MF	VIE	Ngô Ngọc Sơn
6	MF	VIE	Phạm Đức Hòa
7	MF	KUW	Abdulrahman Al-Tawail

No.	Pos.	Nation	Player
8	FW	VIE	Nguyễn Minh Trí
9	FW	VIE	Vũ Đức Tùng
10	FW	VIE	Nguyễn Đắc Huy
11	DF	VIE	Trần Văn Vũ
12	MF	VIE	Vũ Quốc Hùng
13	DF	VIE	Nguyễn Thành Tín
14	MF	VIE	Tôn Thất Phi

=== Al-Dhafrah ===
Manager: (Spain) Luis Fonseca Cilleros

Note: Flags indicate national team as defined under FIFA eligibility rules; some limited exceptions apply. Players may hold more than one non-FIFA nationality.

No.	Pos.	Nation	Player
1	GK	UAE	Hassan Al-Hantoobi
2	FP	UAE	Abdulkarim Jamil
3	FP	UAE	Helal Al-Jaberi
4	FP	KUW	Abdulrahman Al-Wadi
5	FP	UAE	Mohammed Obaid
6	FP	UAE	Mohamed Al-Hammadi
7	FP	UAE	Mohamed Fadaaq

No.	Pos.	Nation	Player
8	FP	UAE	Sabry Hezam
9	FP	UAE	Talib Al-Fzari
10	FP	AZE	Vassoura
11	FP	UAE	Hamdan Al-Katheeri
12	GK	UAE	Taher Ali Husain
13	GK	UAE	Jabir Al-Ali
14	FP	UAE	Younis Al-Hammadi

=== Naft Al-Wasat ===
Manager: Haitham Abbas Bawei

Note: Flags indicate national team as defined under FIFA eligibility rules; some limited exceptions apply. Players may hold more than one non-FIFA nationality.

No.	Pos.	Nation	Player
1	GK	IRQ	Yahya Abdulnoor
2	FP	IRQ	Firas Mohammed
3	FP	IRQ	Zaid Ali
4	FP	IRQ	Tareq Zeyad
5	FP	IRQ	Hussein Al-Zubiaidi
6	FP	IRQ	Salim Faisal
7	FP	IRN	Ghodrat Bahadori

No.	Pos.	Nation	Player
8	FP	IRQ	Mustafa Bachay
9	FP	IRQ	Waleed Khalid
10	FP	IRQ	Hasan Dakheel
11	GK	IRQ	Zaher Mahdi
12	GK	IRQ	Omar Sabti
13	FP	IRN	Farhad Tavakoli
14	FP	IRQ	Hassan Ali Jabar

=== Jeonju MAG ===
Manager: Lee Young-jin

Note: Flags indicate national team as defined under FIFA eligibility rules; some limited exceptions apply. Players may hold more than one non-FIFA nationality.

No.	Pos.	Nation	Player
1	GK	KOR	Lee Jung-min
2	GK	KOR	Jang Si-won
3	FP	KOR	Kim Kyeong-hoon
4	FP	KOR	Ahn Kwang-su
5	FP	KOR	Lee Seul-ong
6	FP	KOR	Yoo Kyung-dong
7	FP	KOR	Kim Jang-goon

No.	Pos.	Nation	Player
8	FP	KOR	Kim In-woo
9	FP	KOR	Hong Jin-ho
10	FP	KOR	Shin Jong-hoon
11	FP	KOR	Cho Byung-geol
12	FP	KOR	Jo Du-hee
13	FP	KOR	Lee Young-hoon
14	FP	KOR	Kim Yeon-woo

== Group C ==
=== Chonburi Bluewave ===
Manager: Rakphol Sainetngam

Note: Flags indicate national team as defined under FIFA eligibility rules; some limited exceptions apply. Players may hold more than one non-FIFA nationality.

No.	Pos.	Nation	Player
1	GK	THA	Arut Senbat
2	GK	THA	Katawut Hankampa
3	DF	THA	Natthapon Suttiroj
4	DF	BRA	Xapa
5	DF	THA	Ronnachai Jungwongsuk
6	MF	THA	Nattawut Srirangpirot
7	DF	THA	Kritsada Wongkaeo

No.	Pos.	Nation	Player
8	MF	THA	Jirawat Sornwichian
9	FW	THA	Suphawut Thueanklang
10	FW	THA	Peerapat Kaewwilai
11	MF	THA	Apiwat Chaemcharoen
12	MF	THA	Nattawut Madyalan
13	MF	THA	Panat Kittipanuwong
14	MF	THA	Sorasak Phoonjungreed

=== Al-Sailiya ===
Manager: (Portugal) João

Note: Flags indicate national team as defined under FIFA eligibility rules; some limited exceptions apply. Players may hold more than one non-FIFA nationality.

No.	Pos.	Nation	Player
1	GK	QAT	Abdulrahman Qahtan
2	FP	QAT	Saad Al-Shahwani
3	FP	QAT	Saad Al-Mohannadi
4	FP	QAT	Ebrahim Al-Yafei
5	FP	QAT	Hamad Muftah
6	FP	BRA	Murilo
7	FP	QAT	Mohamed Al-Suhaiqi

No.	Pos.	Nation	Player
8	FP	IRN	Safari Golabvand
9	FP	QAT	Hazem Selim
10	FP	QAT	Abdullah Al-Yafei
11	FP	QAT	Hadi Al-Braidi
12	GK	QAT	Ahmad Abusabha
13	FP	QAT	Saoud Al-Mutawa
14	FP	QAT	Abdulrahman Al-Hammadi

=== Osh EREM ===
Manager: Daniiar Abdraimov

Note: Flags indicate national team as defined under FIFA eligibility rules; some limited exceptions apply. Players may hold more than one non-FIFA nationality.

No.	Pos.	Nation	Player
1	GK	KGZ	Kirill Ermolov
2	GK	KGZ	Nurtilek Zhailobaev
3	FW	KGZ	Iuldashbai Salimbaev
4	FW	KGZ	Dilshat Kadyrov
5	DF	KGZ	Sukhrobzhon Sherabidinov
6	DF	KGZ	Manas Abdrasul Uulu
7	FW	KAZ	Pavel Taku

No.	Pos.	Nation	Player
8	FW	AFG	Akbar Kazemi
9	FW	KGZ	Maksat Alimov
10	DF	KGZ	Ulanbek Baigazy Uulu
11	FW	KGZ	Adilet Kultaev
12	DF	KGZ	Beksultan Nazarov
13	FW	KGZ	Dosbol Nadirov
14	DF	KGZ	Emil Kanetov

=== Vic Vipers ===
Manager: Miltiadis Sakkos

Note: Flags indicate national team as defined under FIFA eligibility rules; some limited exceptions apply. Players may hold more than one non-FIFA nationality.

No.	Pos.	Nation	Player
1	GK	AUS	Christos Apostolakis
2	GK	AUS	Peter Tamburrino
3	DF	AUS	Adam Cooper
4	FP	AUS	Miguel Barrigos
5	FP	AUS	Brett Forward
6	FP	AUS	Adriano Martino
7	FP	AUS	Victor Brauner

No.	Pos.	Nation	Player
8	FP	AUS	Jordan Constantinidis
9	FP	AUS	Maxim Avram
10	FP	MAS	Yazid Kamaruzuan
11	MF	AUS	Jonathan Barrientos
12	GK	AUS	Ryan Timmins
13	FP	AUS	Joshua Allen
14	FP	AUS	Shayan Alinejad

== Group D ==
=== Mes Sungun ===
Manager: Hamid Bigham

Note: Flags indicate national team as defined under FIFA eligibility rules; some limited exceptions apply. Players may hold more than one non-FIFA nationality.

No.	Pos.	Nation	Player
1	GK	IRN	Saeid Momeni
2	GK	IRN	Alireza Samimi
3	MF	IRN	Bahman Jafari
4	DF	IRN	Babak Nasiri
5	DF	IRN	Hamid Ahmadi
6	DF	IRN	Mohammad Reza Sangsefidi
7	MF	IRN	Ali Asghar Hassanzadeh

No.	Pos.	Nation	Player
8	FW	IRN	Morteza Ezzati
9	DF	IRN	Saeed Taghizadeh
10	FW	IRN	Hossein Tayyebi
11	MF	IRN	Abolghasem Orouji
12	MF	IRN	Farhad Fakhimzadeh
13	MF	IRN	Touhid Lotfi
14	FW	IRN	Alireza Askari

=== Bank of Beirut ===
Manager: (Serbia) Dejan Đedović

Note: Flags indicate national team as defined under FIFA eligibility rules; some limited exceptions apply. Players may hold more than one non-FIFA nationality.

No.	Pos.	Nation	Player
1	GK	LBN	Hussein Hamadani
2	GK	LBN	Karim Joueidi
3	MF	LBN	Ali Tneich
4	DF	LBN	Ali El-Homsi
5	MF	LBN	Mehdi Koubeissi
6	MF	LBN	Mohamad Kobeissy
7	FW	LBN	Moustafa Serhan

No.	Pos.	Nation	Player
8	FW	LBN	Steve Koukezian
9	FW	LBN	Mouhammad Hammoud
10	MF	LBN	Ahmad Kheir El-Dine
11	MF	BRA	Bello
12	DF	LBN	Karim Abou Zeid
13	GK	LBN	Mohamad Zreik
14	FW	IRN	Mahdi Javid

=== AGMK ===
Manager: Aleksandr Petrov

Note: Flags indicate national team as defined under FIFA eligibility rules; some limited exceptions apply. Players may hold more than one non-FIFA nationality.

No.	Pos.	Nation	Player
1	GK	UZB	Rustam Umarov
2	GK	UZB	Pulat Olimov
3	FP	UZB	Mashrab Adilov
4	FP	UZB	Shukhrat Tojiboev
5	FP	UZB	Sarvar Shaakhmedov
6	FP	UZB	Javlon Anorov
7	FP	UZB	Davronjon Abdurakhmanov

No.	Pos.	Nation	Player
8	FP	UZB	Farkhod Abdumavlyanov
9	FP	UZB	Andrey Shlema
10	FP	UZB	Jamoliddin Sharipov
11	FP	UZB	Sunnat Kuralov
12	FP	UZB	Klim Tyugayev
13	FP	UZB	Akbar Usmonov
14	FP	UZB	Konstantin Sviridov

=== Sipar Khujand ===
Manager: (Iran) Benyamin Eghbali

Note: Flags indicate national team as defined under FIFA eligibility rules; some limited exceptions apply. Players may hold more than one non-FIFA nationality.

No.	Pos.	Nation	Player
1	GK	TJK	Shukhrat Bibudov
2	GK	TJK	Firuz Yusufzoda
3	GK	TJK	Shahboz Ismoilov
4	DF	TJK	Abdusamad Rahmonov
5	FW	TJK	Sobirdzhon Gulyakov
6	DF	IRN	Mehran Rezapour
7	FW	TJK	Bahrom Yarmatov

No.	Pos.	Nation	Player
8	MF	TJK	Iqboli Vositzoda
9	MF	IRN	Zahir Kamyab
10	FW	TJK	Sherzod Jumaev
11	FW	TJK	Fazliddin Qurbonov
12	FW	TJK	Umed Kuziev
13	DF	TJK	Rustam Hamidov
14	FW	TJK	Dilshod Salomov
