= Dhanak Kay Rang =

2020 Pakistani compilation album by various artists

Dhanak Kay Rang (Vol. 1)

Compilation album by various artists
- Released: 21 September 2020
- Genres: Pakistani patriotic songs
- Length: 2:18:51
- Language: Urdu
- Label: ISPR media productions
- Producer: ISPR

Dhanak Kay Rang (Vol. 1) (Urdu: دھنک کے رنگ, lit. 'Colours of the Rainbow') is a 2020 Pakistani patriotic songs' compilation album by various artists for different national occasions, including Pakistan Day, Independence Day, and Defence Day. The album also features motivational songs for Pakistan Armed Forces, and was released by Inter-Services Public Relations (ISPR) via multiple music streaming services.

== Background ==
The track "Chand Roshan Chamakta Sitara Rahe" was originally performed by Munawar Sultana and Dilshad Begum soon after Pakistan's independence in August 1947. (Note: Some sources claim only one name, either Munawar Sultana or Dilshad Begum; and some claim the name of singer Zarqa.) "Mere Dhol Sipahya" was originally performed in Punjabi by Noor Jehan to pay tribute to the Pakistan armed forces and martyrs during the 1965 war. The track "Har Ghari Tayyar Kamran", originally performed by Khalid Waheed during 1970s to 1980s, was remade and released for the Defence Day in September 2020.

In 2015, tracks like "Tu Thori Dair" and "Yeh Banday Mitti Kay Banday" were released in honour of Operation Zarb-e-Azb. The former one was also recreated as "Thodi Der" with Shreya Ghoshal as co-singer with Farhan Saeed, for 2017 Hindi film Half Girlfriend.

Musician Sahir Ali Bagga and lyricist Imran Raza have collaborated on a number of tracks that are featured in the album.

"Shukriya Pakistan" was originally released for the Independence Day in August 2014. It is also adapted by ARY Digital Network as a campaign to celebrate the occasion.

To honour the martyrs and survivors of 2014 Peshawar school massacre, Bagga's son Azaan performed "Bara Dushman Bana Phirta Hai", and then on their first anniversary, they released another track "Mujhe Dushman Ke Bachon Ko Parhana Hai". On the fourth anniversary, Bagga's second son Zayer performed "Humain Agay Hi Jana Hai".

In 2018, the song "Mujhey Agay Hi Jana Hai" was released for the Women's Day. "Hamara Pakistan" was released in seven regional languages for the occasion of Pakistan Day. "Kar Aghaaz Pakistan" was released for the Independence Day prior to the Plant for Pakistan campaign. "Hamain Pyar Hai Pakistan Sae" was released for the Defence Day.

After inspirations from the 2019 Jammu and Kashmir airstrikes and Abhinandan Varthaman's incident, the song "Har Dil Ki Awaz" was created, also known as "Pakistan Zindabad". Bagga performed it in the closing ceremony during 2019 Pakistan Super League final, for the occasion of Pakistan Day. The song was also copied in India by T. Raja Singh as "Hindustan Zindabad".

ISPR collaborated with Hum TV's MD Productions for a 2019 television series Ehd-e-Wafa, which had two tracks; "Yaarian" and "Ehd E Wafa".

== Track listing ==
No.	Title	Lyrics	Music	Singer(s)	Length
1.	"Yaarian" (Ehd-e-Wafa OST)	Imran Raza	Sahir Ali Bagga	Ali Zafar, Aima Baig, Asim Azhar, Sahir Ali Bagga	4:32
2.	"Har Ghari Tayyar Kamran"	Zafar Ullah Poshni, Ali Hayat Rizvi	Niaz Ahmed, Ali Hamza	Noori, Ali Azmat, Asim Azhar	4:14
3.	"Hamain Pyar Hai Pakistan Sae"	Imran Raza	Sahir Ali Bagga	Atif Aslam	5:04
4.	"Kashmir Ko Haqq Do Bharat"			Shehzad Roy	4:41
5.	"Chand Roshan Chamakta Sitara Rahe"	Shaukat Thanvi	Qadir Farid, Shiraz Uppal	Fariha Pervez, Shiraz Uppal	2:36
6.	"Tu Khud Ban Pakistan"		Sahir Ali Bagga	Sahir Ali Bagga, Sara Raza Khan, Amanat Ali, Ali Abbas	3:51
7.	"Ehd E Wafa" (OST)	Imran Raza	Rahat Fateh Ali Khan	Rahat Fateh Ali Khan	5:00
8.	"Mere Dhol Sipahya" (Punjabi, Urdu)	Ghulam Mustafa Tabassum, Nisha Ali	Noor Jehan, Imran Ali	Shehzad Roy, Ayesha Omar	6:34
9.	"Sab Pakistani Miltay Hain"		Sahir Ali Bagga	Sahir Ali Bagga, Shafqat Amanat Ali, Aima Baig	4:04
10.	"Shukriya Pakistan"	Imran Raza	Sahir Ali Bagga	Rahat Fateh Ali Khan	5:46
11.	"Yun Pakistan Bana Tha"	Imran Raza	Sahir Ali Bagga	Sahir Ali Bagga	5:49
12.	"Hamara Pakistan" (Sindhi)		Sahir Ali Bagga	Asim Azhar	4:08
13.	"Tu Thori Dair" (Punjabi)		Farhan Saeed	Farhan Saeed	5:16
14.	"Hanstay Hanstay Youn Hi Hum Chalen"	Imran Raza		Ali Zafar	4:09
15.	"Kabhi Percham Mein Lipte Hain"	Imran Raza		Atif Aslam	5:34
16.	"Bara Dushman Bana Phirta Hai"	Imran Raza	Sahir Ali Bagga	Azaan Ali Bagga	3:48
17.	"Mein Bhi Tou Pukara Jaon Ga"			Hamid Ali Khan	5:12
18.	"Yeh Banday Mitti Kay Banday"			Mustafa Zahid	3:57
19.	"Paniyon Pe Chalen"			Rahat Fateh Ali Khan	5:01
20.	"Charhta Suraj"			Rahat Fateh Ali Khan	5:00
21.	"Kar Aghaaz Pakistan"	Imran Raza	Sahir Ali Bagga	Rahat Fateh Ali Khan	5:15
22.	"Vichora"	Imran Raza	Sahir Ali Bagga	Rahat Fateh Ali Khan	2:44
23.	"Har Dil Ki Awaz"	Imran Raza	Sahir Ali Bagga	Sahir Ali Bagga	3:52
24.	"Watan Ka Ishq"		Sahir Ali Bagga	Sahir Ali Bagga	4:02
25.	"Hain Ye Pasban"			Shafqat Amanat Ali	3:24
26.	"Mujhey Agay Hi Jana Hai" (Women's Day 2018)			Rose Mary	3:24
27.	"Zameen Jaagti Hai"	Imran Raza		Atif Aslam	4:27
28.	"Humain Agay Hi Jana Hai"	Imran Raza	Sahir Ali Bagga	Zayer Ali Bagga	4:28
29.	"Mujhe Dushman Ke Bachon Ko Parhana Hai"	Imran Raza	Sahir Ali Bagga	Azaan Ali Bagga	4:32
30.	"Watan Ki Jeet"			Ali Zafar	4:16
31.	"Hum Tere Sapahi Hain"	Imran Raza	Sahir Ali Bagga	Sahir Ali Bagga	4:11
Total length:					2:18:51

== Accolades ==
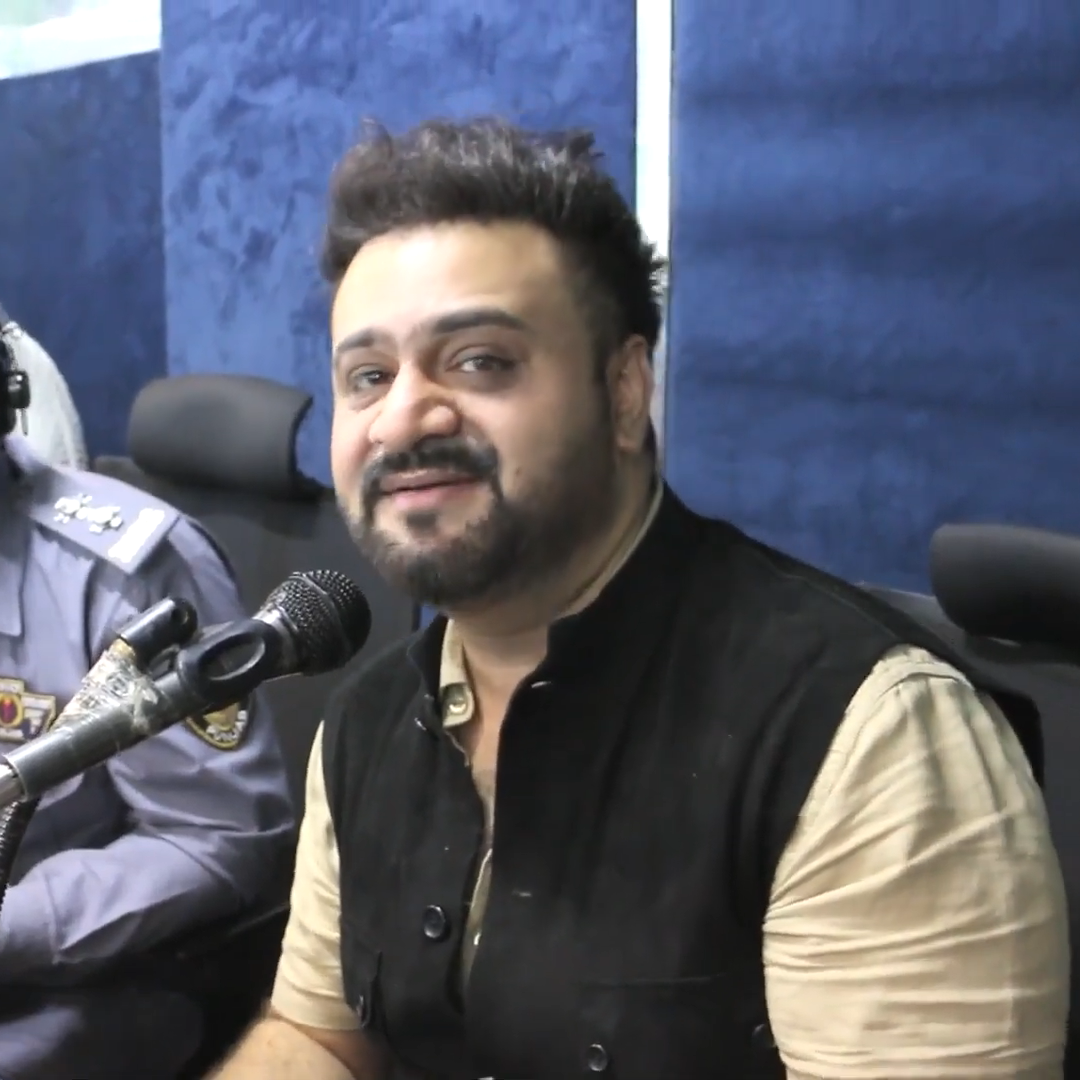
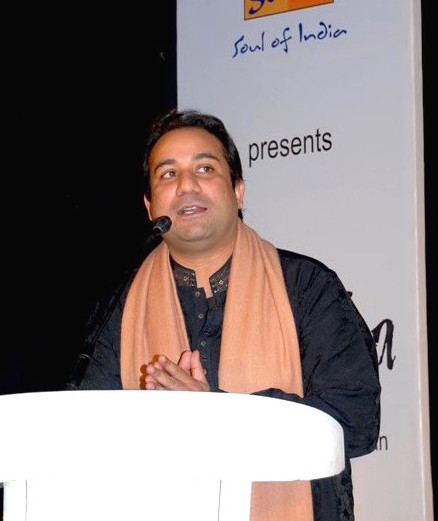
Sahir Ali Bagga (left) and Rahat Fateh Ali Khan (right)

In September 2020, Bagga was presented with Pride of Performance Award by then Governor of Punjab for the track "Bara Dushman Bana Phirta Hai". In October 2021, Rahat Fateh Ali Khan bagged Lux Style Award for Best Original Soundtrack for "Ehd E Wafa" (OST).

== See also ==
External media

Audio
- Dhanak Kay Rang, Vol. 1 (ISPR) on iTunes
- Dhanak Kay Rang, Vol. 1 (ISPR) playlist on YouTube

Video
- ISPR Songs playlist on YouTube

- Sahir Ali Bagga discography
- Rahat Fateh Ali Khan discography
- Atif Aslam discography
- Ali Zafar discography
