= Jo Tu Na Mila =

2018 Urdu Ballad song

Single by Asim Azhar
- Language: Urdu
- Released: 20 November 2018
- Genre: Pakistani pop
- Length: 4:20 (video); 3:57 (audio)
- Label: VYRL Originals
- Composer: Asim Azhar
- Lyricist: Kunaal Verma
- Producer: Waqas Hasan

Asim Azhar singles chronology
"Teriyaan" (2017)	"Jo Tu Na Mila" (2018)	"Humrahi" (2019)

Music video
- "Jo Tu Na Mila" on YouTube

"Jo Tu Na Mila" (Urdu: جو تو نہ ملا transl. If I don't get you) is a 2018 Pakistani song. It was composed and recorded by Asim Azhar with lyrics written by Kunaal Verma.

== Release and success ==
The song was released by VYRL Originals on YouTube on 20 November 2018. The song crossed 15 million views within a few days of its release. It received the highest views for a Pakistani song in one day on YouTube. The song passed 100 million views on YouTube on 4 May 2020.

In 2020, the song was accused of copying the melody of "A Town with an Ocean View," a song by Japanese composer Joe Hisaishi featured in the Studio Ghibli film Kiki's Delivery Service.

== Music video ==
The song's music video, directed by Yasir Jaswal, features Asim Azhar, Iqra Aziz and Waleed Khalid. The video begins with an aerial shot of a city, and shows Azhar following his girlfriend who is on a date with another man. After following for a while, he chooses to leave, and is finally seen burning pictures of the two of them, ready to move on from the relationship.

== Accolades ==
Award	Category	Result
Sony MIX Audience Music Awards	"Best non-film song"	Nominated

== Credits and personnel ==
- Singer: Asim Azhar
- Director: Yasir Jaswal
- Starring: Iqra Aziz and Waleed Khalid
- Composer: Asim Azhar
- Music Producer: Qasim Azhar
- Lyrics: Kunaal Verma
- Co-Produced by Haider Ali
- Co-Composer by Hasan Ali
- Mixed by Chris "TEK" O Ryan
- Mastered by Joe Bozzi
- D.O.P: Farhan Hafeez
- Gaffer: Asif Hasan
- Focus Puller: Waqas Younis
- Wardrobe & Styling: Ehtesham Ansari
- Hair & Makeup: Nauman & Aqeel at Toni & Guy Production
- Design: Zain Khan at Cinescapes
- Line Producer: Zuhaib Fayyaz
- Producer: Waqas Hasan
- Post: JaswalFilms
- VFX: ProVision Post

Credits source
