= Khelenge Beat Pe =

2026 Pakistan Super League official anthem

- Anthem cover

Promotional single by various artists
- Language: English; Urdu; Punjabi
- Released: 24 March 2026
- Recorded: 2026
- Studio: Attic
- Genre: Stadium anthem
- Length: 3:13
- Label: Pepsi Pakistan
- Composers: Nimra Gillani; Shamsher Rana
- Lyricists: Nimra Gillani; Daniya Kanwal
- Producer: Shamsher Rana

Pakistan Super League anthems chronology
"X Dekho" (2025)	"Khelenge Beat Pe" (2026)
Music Video
- Directed by: Zeeshan Parwez
- Cinematography: Salar Yousufzai
- Edited by: Zeeshan Parwez
- Production company: Epic Pictures
- Release date: 2026
- Running time: 3:23

"Khelenge Beat Pe" (Urdu: کھیلیں گے بیٹ پہ, lit. 'Will Play on the Beat') is a 2026 song, produced by Pepsi Pakistan, and performed by Atif Aslam, Aima Baig, the Sabri Sisters, and Daniya Kanwal, with Nimra Gillani and Shamsher Rana credited as secondary artists. It served as the official anthem of the eleventh season of the Pakistan Super League.

== Background and release ==
In January 2026, the Pakistan Cricket Board (PCB) invited bids for the eleventh season of Pakistan Super League (PSL), and marketed the event as a "new era". With the addition of two new franchises, the league featured eight teams for the first time; the squads were formed via player auction, replacing the draft method used in the previous ten seasons. Also, the league was played under a revised game format. (Note: Pieces of information are gathered from Geo News, Dawn, The News, and A Sports.)

On 22 February, Aima Baig addressed rumours on her Instagram handle by confirming that she was collaborating with Atif Aslam for the PSL official anthem. Days later, on 18 March, CEO PSL, Salman Naseer, signed a three-year MoU with senior marketing director Pepsi Pakistan, Hakima Mirza, for Pepsi to be an entertainment partner in PSL. During the signing ceremony, they announced that Atif Aslam would be performing the anthem. Soon after, the anthem title along with the names of the collaborating singers were also revealed by PSL via their social media. This was Aslam's second and Baig's fourth PSL anthem, and the debuting artists included sufi-music duo Sabri Sisters (Saman and Anamta Sabri, nieces of Amjad Sabri) and rapper Daniya Kanwal.

Out of all the singers, only Baig had previously performed in multiple PSL ceremonies in different stadiums over the years, while Aslam was only featured in a pre-recorded ceremony in 2021 and a low-scale curtain raiser in 2022 due to then COVID-19 pandemic in Pakistan. The two had previously also collaborated for the #HBLPSL7 anthem "Agay Dekh". (Note: Attributed to different sources from 2018, 2019, 2021, 2022, 2023, and 2024.)

In 2026, however, the league was temporarily scaled down due to economic impact of the 2026 Iran war. On-field spectators were not allowed and the opening ceremony was also scrapped; instead, a watch-from-home model was introduced.

On 24 March, chairman PCB Mohsin Naqvi hosted a gathering event for welcoming the international players, where many national players and the political figures were also present. The anthem was released during the event.

== Reception ==
In a review, Dawn Images preferred calling it a "high-energy, dance-first track" on a "more familiar route", instead of going on "nostalgia". 24 Digital praised each singer and the music video production, particularly highlighting the use of CGI and street moments of playing cricket and riding a bike. Ali A. Rizvi of The Jungle Today noted its "familiar problems" while comparing it with other PSL anthems, including its "baffling relationship with rap", and Aima Baig's repeated "institutional memory". According to the 24 Digital, World Echo News, and Ali A. Rizvi, the anthem received mixed reception by the fans on social media.

On Twitter, sports journalists including Abdul Ghaffar called it "very energetic" and "visually mastered", Abdul Majid Bhatti called it a "blockbuster", and Qadir Khawaja called it overall enjoyable. However, Amer Malik called it only a "Pepsi commercial" with nothing "catchy" or "special", and Ahmer Najeeb Satti rated out of 10; the anthem as 3 while its visuals as 9.

== Closing ceremony ==
On 3 May, Gaddafi Stadium, Lahore hosted a closing ceremony before the 2026 Pakistan Super League final match. The ceremony featured the PSL trophy, Infinity, which was presented by a female gymnast during her flight on an air balloon. Musical performances included Ali Azmat and Arif Lohar, followed by the PSL anthem "Khelenge Beat Pe" performance by Aslam, Baig, Kanwal, and Sabri Sisters, taking the stage. The ceremony concluded with a fireworks display. Since the gates for the stadium were opened, the event had reportedly 32,461 in-house spectators, which is claimed to be the most attended PSL event ever. (Note: Pieces of information are gathered from The Nation, The News, Geo News, and Hum News.)

== See also ==
External media

Audio
- Full audio on YouTube

Video
- Music video on YouTube
- Closing ceremony performance on YouTube

- List of Pakistan Super League anthems
- Atif Aslam discography
- Aima Baig discography
