= The Aazadi Anthem =

2021 Kashmir Premier League anthem

Song by Rahat Fateh Ali Khan
- English title: "The Freedom Anthem"
- Released: 16 February 2021
- Recorded: 2020/2021
- Length: 3:46
- Composer: Kamran Akhtar
- Producer: 5th Element Entertainment

Kashmir Premier League anthems chronology
| "The Aazadi Anthem" (2021) | "Khelo Aazadi Se" (2022) |

"The Aazadi Anthem" (Urdu: "آزادی کا ترانہ"; transl. The Freedom Anthem) was the official anthem of the 2021 Kashmir Premier League, the first season of the Kashmir Premier League. It was sung by Rahat Fateh Ali Khan, who was the official singer for the 2021 KPL, and directed by Shaan Shahid. It featured former Pakistan cricketers Shahid Afridi, Wasim Akram and Imran Nazir, former squash champion Jahangir Khan, actors Mehwish Hayat, Ayesha Omer, Iman Ali, Fiza Ali, Neelam Muneer, Nadeem Baig, Afzal Khan and singer Gul Panra.

== Release ==
The song was released via YouTube and received over 1 million views. It was performed at the opening ceremony of the 2021 KPL. The 2021 KPL was promoted on social media by the hashtag #KheloAazadiSe, which is the chorus of the song.
