= Adnan Samad Khan =

Pakistani television actor

- Occupations: Theatre actor; Television actor
- Years active: 2019–present
- Awards: (See below)

Adnan Samad Khan is a Pakistani television actor, who is best known for the portrayal of Captain Gulzar in Hum TV's Ehd-e-Wafa.

== Early life and career ==
Samad Khan lives in Taunsa. He started his showbiz career from theater after intermediate graduation from NAPA. He did theater plays for 4 years before making his on-screen debut.

He first appeared in a supporting role in ISPR and Momina Duraid's Ehd-e-Wafa where he portrayed a military cadet of Saraiki descent who later becomes a Captain. This performance was well-received, and won Khan the Lux Style Award for Best Emerging Talent in TV.

== Filmography ==
=== Television ===
| Year | Title | Role | Notes |
|---|---|---|---|
| 2019–20 | Ehd-e-Wafa | Captain Gulzar | |
| 2021–22 | Ishq-e-Laa | Abid Ali | |
| 2022 | Fraud | Nael | |
| 2022 | Wehem | Fareed | |
| 2023 | Kuch Ankahi | Shakeel | |
| 2023 | Mann Aangan | Usman | |
| 2023 | Sukoon | Usman | |
| 2023 | Khumar | Nasir | |
| 2025 | Mafaad Parast | Zain | |
| 2025 | Mann Mast Malang | Sikandar | |

== Accolades ==
- 2020 - Pakistan International Screen Awards - Best Television Actor in Comedy Role for Ehd-e-Wafa
- 2021 - Lux Style Awards - Best Emerging Talent in TV for Ehd-e-Wafa
