= Khul Ke Khel =

2024 Pakistan Super League official anthem

- Anthem cover

Promotional single by Ali Zafar and Aima Baig
- Language: Urdu
- Released: 14 February 2024
- Recorded: 2024
- Studio: Lightingale
- Genre: Stadium anthem
- Length: 3:24
- Label: Lightingale
- Songwriter: Ali Zafar
- Producers: Ali Zafar; Shani Arshad

Pakistan Super League anthems chronology
"Sab Sitaray Humaray" (2023)	"Khul Ke Khel" (2024)	"X Dekho" (2025)
Music Video
- Directed by: Soheb Aktar; Sonu Dangerous (dance choreographer)
- Produced by: Arif; Adeel Akbar; Rehan Salaam; Nouman Saleem
- Cinematography: Ahsan Raza
- Edited by: Zahid
- Production companies: Tryangle Productions; Karawood Studio (shoot location)
- Release date: 2024
- Running time: 3:25

"Khul Ke Khel" (Urdu: کھل کے کھیل, lit. 'Play Fearlessly') is a 2024 song, written and produced by Ali Zafar, and performed by him and Aima Baig. It served as the official anthem of the ninth season of the Pakistan Super League.

Zafar returned with a PSL anthem after six years, while Baig is a frequent collaborator. The anthem became one of the trending topics on social media, and received mixed reviews. Opening ceremony was held in Lahore for the first time, where Zafar performed his previous anthems as well, noted to be classic.

== Background and release ==
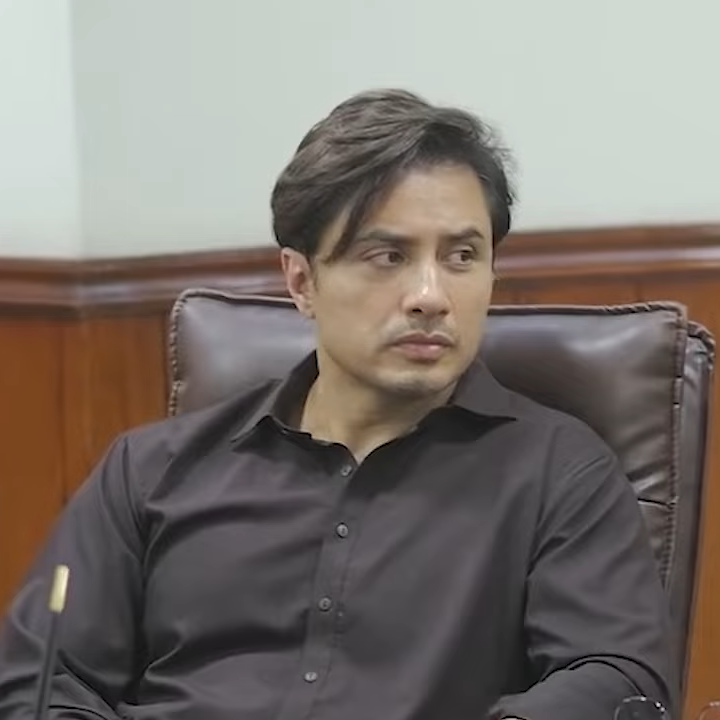
Ali Zafar

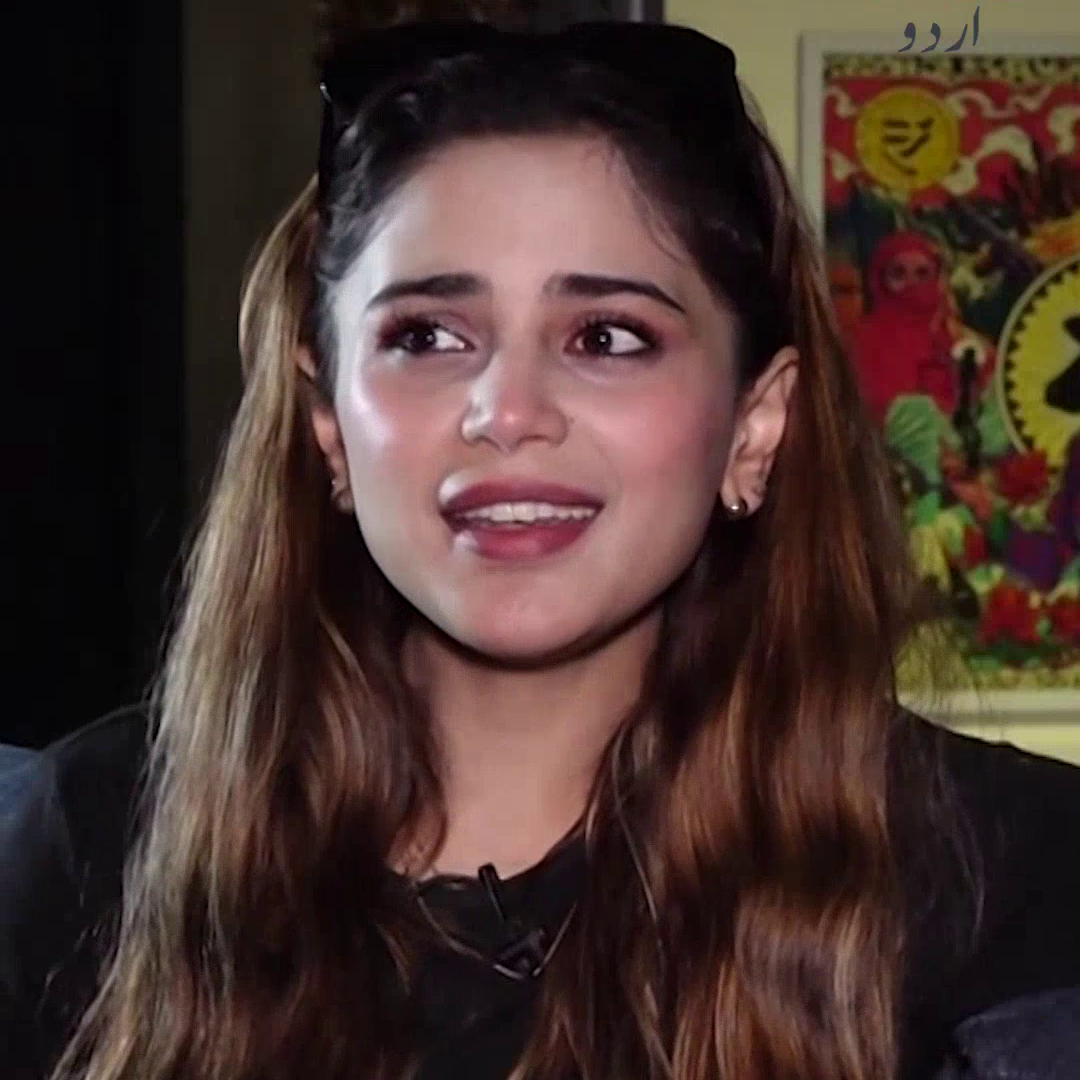
Aima Baig

Anthem artists

Ali Zafar had continuously been a part of the league thrice since its inaugural till 2018. However, due to the legal battle of Ali Zafar vs. Meesha Shafi, he could not be the part officially again after 2018, despite having the most successful anthems reportedly.

In mid-January 2024, it was reported that Pakistan Cricket Board (PCB) had contacted Zafar to return this year for the anthem. He started working on three songs in November 2023 before one got finalized into planning phase. However, his contract was pulled when some franchises (Note: Reportedly Multan Sultans' general manager Hijab Zahid and Lahore Qalandars' CEO Atif Rana) objected that his involvement would tarnish the league's image. Zafar took his X social handle for an audience poll asking the same, which sparked further speculations.

However, days after then PCB chairman Zaka Ashraf resigned, Aima Baig shared the news on 1 February through her Instagram handle that she signed in along with Zafar, and the anthem title was officially revealed on 4 February with hashtag #KhulKeKhel. While Baig has performed two consecutive title anthems before in 2021 and 2022, she has been a part of the league's multiple ceremonies since 2018.

The anthem was released on 14 February 2024 across multiple social media platforms. While the music features similar synth horns and anthemic drums as were in his previous anthem "Ab Khel Jamay Ga" along with a non-verbal chorus for the crowd, its theme encourage the fearlessness during the game.

== Opening ceremony ==
Gaddafi Stadium, Lahore, hosted its first opening ceremony for the league on 17 February 2024. Natasha Baig opened with the Leo Twins to perform "Qaumi Taranah", followed by a laser lighting display. Afterwards, Arif Lohar performed with his sons, and then Noori performed. Then, Zafar performed on all his previous anthems, followed by his collaboration with Baig for the current title anthem. The ceremony closed with the fireworks.

== Reception ==
Within two days of release, the anthem topped on YouTube Music in Pakistan, and hashtag #KingIsBack started trending on X, with some people referring Zafar as the king of the cricket anthems, while others referring to Imran Khan.

The Express Tribune reported that the anthem received mixed reception, with people comparing it with "Ab Khel Jamay Ga". Manahil Tahira wrote in The Express Tribune that Zafar's latest anthem may "evoke nostalgia for whom 7 years is a long time" and may be "boredom for those who remember". Samaa TV noted that with Zafar's "signature energy" and Baig's "captivating vocals", the anthem "captures the spirit of cricket and the passion of Pakistani fans". Ameena Amin wrote for Startup Pakistan that the anthem's "upbeat tempo", "engaging lyrics", and "dynamic melody" sets an "electrifying cricket season". Hamna Farrukh of Synergyzer praised the anthem by writing that the "music checks the right boxes; the lyrics align with the song's overall vibe", however, criticised the inclusion of Aima Baig.

Cricket journalists like Qadir Khawaja called it ok but not so special, while Ahmer Najeeb called it a "great, energetic, vibrant" anthem. While Arfa Feroz disapproved it to be "a cricket material" and called it "a failed attempt to relive" the "standard" of "previous PSL anthems by" Zafar, Omair Alavi called it his third favourite anthem for PSL behind Zafar's previous anthems, while Imran Siddique regarded it as "the second best song of PSL history". A reviewer in Dawn noted the anthem's "cheerleading lyrics", "a groovy beat", and "cool vocals", but "a little too Bollywoody" choreography. Azhar Khan of The Nation remarked the performances of the singers at the opening ceremony as the highlight and electrifying. Ahmer Naqvi of Dunya Digital and Ali A. Rizvi of The Jungle Today criticised the repetition of similar lyrics and music from Zafar's previous anthems. While Naqvi noted the "torturous level of non-verbal choruses", Rizvi called it "the nostalgia trap" that denies "creative strategy".

== See also ==
External media

Audio
- Audio on YouTube

Video
- Music video on YouTube
- Opening ceremony performance on YouTube

- List of Pakistan Super League anthems
- Aima Baig discography
