= Agay Dekh =

2022 Pakistan Super League official anthem

- Anthem cover

Promotional single by Atif Aslam, Aima Baig
- Released: 24 January 2022
- Recorded: 2022
- Genre: Stadium anthem Electronic dance music
- Length: 3:02
- Label: TikTok
- Composers: Abdullah Siddiqui; Atif Aslam; Natasha Noorani
- Lyricist: (see below)
- Producer: Abdullah Siddiqui

Pakistan Super League anthems chronology
"Groove Mera" (2021)	"Agay Dekh" (2022)	"Sab Sitaray Humaray" (2023)

"Agay Dekh" (Urdu: آگے دیکھ, lit. 'Look Beyond') is a 2022 song from Pakistan, which is composed and produced by Abdullah Siddiqui, and performed by Atif Aslam and Aima Baig. Released in collaboration with TikTok, served as the official anthem of the seventh season of the Pakistan Super League.

The anthem opened to mixed reception, with the PSL later also uploading a compilation music video, using fan videos from social media. A low-budget curtain raiser was also held in Karachi against the backdrop of the COVID-19 pandemic.

== Background and release ==
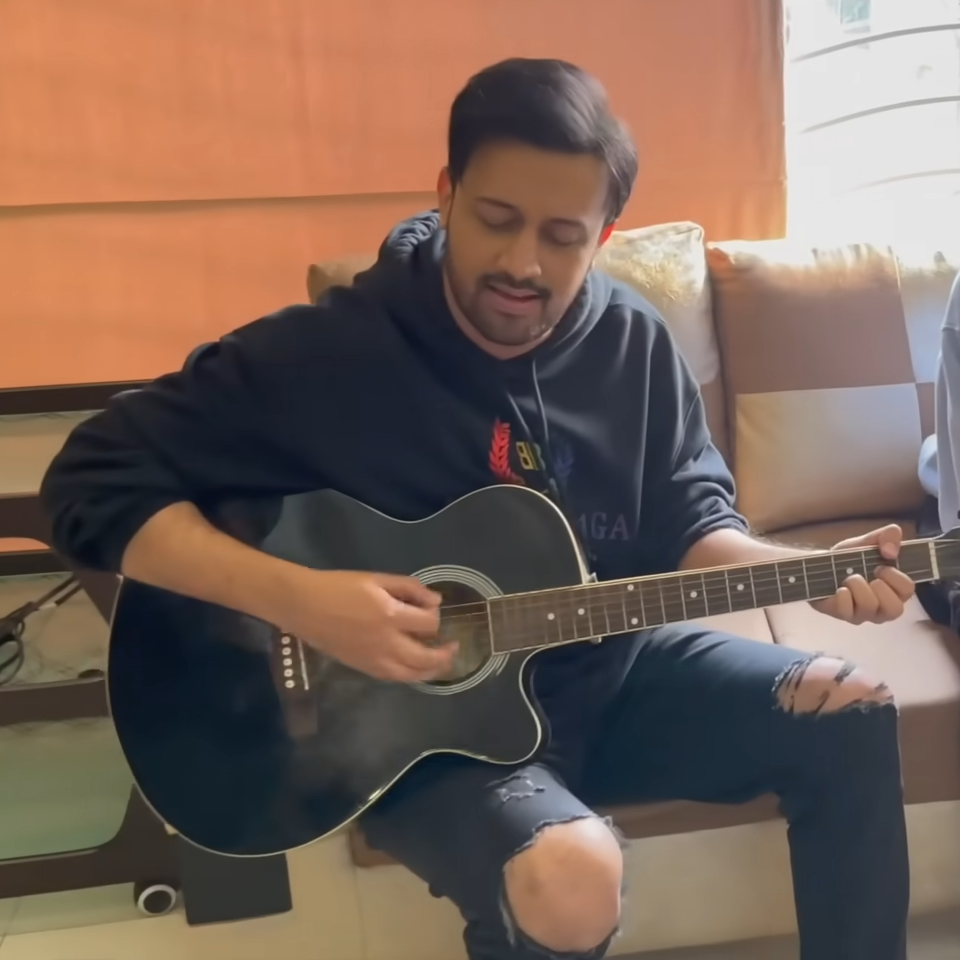
Atif Aslam

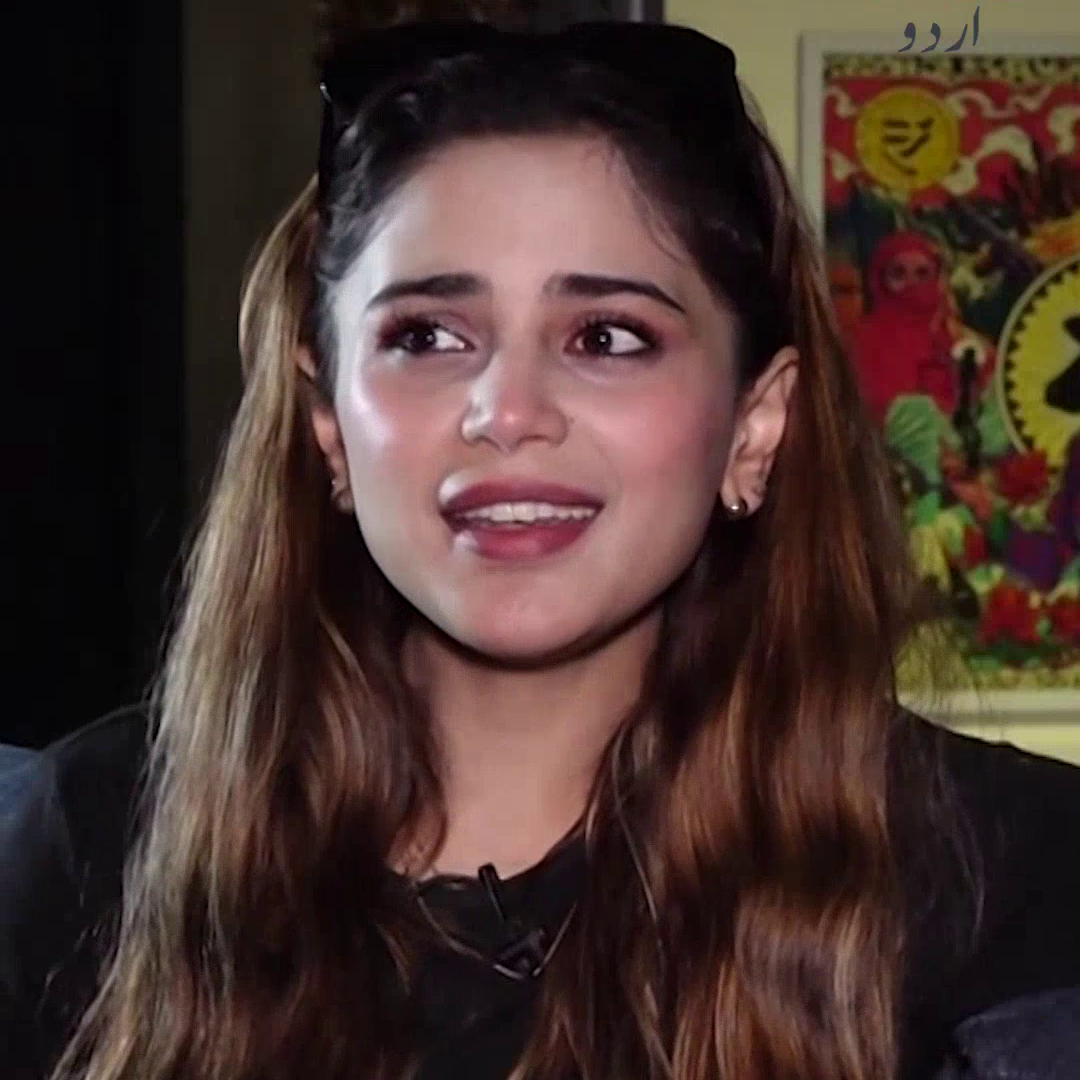
Aima Baig

Anthem artists

As the Pakistan Cricket Board (PCB) directed the marketing team to find a sponsor to complete the anthem instead of self-funding, and decided to host a low-scale curtain raiser, TikTok signed-in in January 2022 with two-year partnership for entertainment, represented by Ramiz Raja, then PCB chairman, and Paul Katrib, head of brand marketing and strategy for TikTok in Pakistan. They further called fans to share moments on their accounts using hashtag #KhelegaPakistan.

On 13 January, it was announced that the anthem is a collaboration between "Atif Aslam and Aima Baig with Abdullah Siddiqui". This is Baig's second PSL anthem in a row. Siddiqui, who was featured in Forbes 30 Under 30 in 2021 and had endorsed Peshawar Zalmi earlier, revealed that he got the job based on a demo he had and then the melody was created with Natasha Noorani. As per the official statement, the anthem's theme was set to cheer the mood during the COVID-19 pandemic in Pakistan and "look beyond" by enjoying the game rather than just a victory or defeat.

The music video, directed by Zeeshan Perwez, has been shot in Lahore during 19 to 21 January; with outdoor at Gaddafi Stadium, and indoor at Bari and Evernew Studios. Few making-of scenes were leaked by some of the fans who were called upon by PCB to attend the filming. First official teaser was released on official TikTok account of PSL on 23 January, while the anthem was released on 24 January. Production team Check-Box Media (CBM) shared that it took 10 days in the "entire journey from conceptualisation to release".

== Curtain raiser ==
The curtain raiser was held in National Stadium, Karachi on 27 January, which started with "Qaumi Taranah". A documentary by Sharmeen Obaid-Chinoy was played, narrating 70 years history of international cricket for Pakistan in voice of Ramiz Raja. Three paragliders from Red Bull X-Alps, Austria, were featured; namely Florian Greger, Paul Steiner, and Stefan Muller.

Then, Aslam and Baig came to stage, having official tagline #LevelHai, to perform the anthem. Prime Minister of Pakistan and former cricketer Imran Khan made an appearance via a recorded video message, followed by live fireworks display.

== Reception ==
In a review, Independent Urdu noted that the music feels a bit slow, and one may keep waiting for a moment to step up and dance. The Express Tribune reviewed the music is able to get one on "feet to dance", but lacks a quality of being an anthem. A reviewer in Dawn called it a "cool track" with a "foot-tapping beat" and a "contemporary" melody. BBC Urdu and Dawn Images noted that the anthem has received mixed reactions on social media, however, The Express Tribune reported the reactions to be "widely positive", and Daily Jang's Zainab Nasir noted "netizens might have disliked". Nasir, however, praised the looks and styling of both the singers.

On Twitter, journalists like Arfa Feroz called the anthem "a complete disappointment" while Ihtisham Ul Haq as "just ok", however, both remembered the standard of previous anthems by Ali Zafar. Abdul Ghaffar noted it as an "energetic anthem" with "brilliant production" due to precense of Aslam. In 2024, Manahil Tahira of The Express Tribune wrote that despite the "saving grace" of "Aslam's stardom", the anthem failed "sportly aesthetic". In 2025, Ahmer Naqvi praised Atif Aslam in his review in Dunya Digital, and wrote that the song carries his "inevitable" "gold dust". In 2026, Ali A. Rizvi of The Jungle Today wrote that the anthem us "forward-looking in spirit and competent in execution" and is "solidly in the top half of the PSL anthem" listing.

Daily Pakistan reported that the twenty-minute curtain raiser cost about Rs. 2.5 crore, (Note: At that time, US$1 was equivalent to Rs. 176.98) and BBC Urdu reported that people appreciated the video message by Imran Khan as a brilliant advertising. However, Aamna Haider Isani noted that it was "lacking in oomph and oeuvre" as well as couldn't create a "hoopla" that it should have by its seventh season, though she praised the anthem artists.

During a Karachi Kings–Lahore Qalandars rivalry match on 30 January 2017, a fan's video went viral on social media who was dancing in stadium while the anthem was being played. Later, the PSL also released a compilation music video featuring fan videos from TikTok dancing to the anthem. (Note: Fact obtained from YouTube)

== Personnel ==
Adapted from music video on YouTube:

- Additional Composition: Maanu, Omer Ahmad, and Atif Aslam
- Writer(s): Natasha Noorani, Sami Khan, Maanu, Mustapha Zafar, Omer Ahmad, and Atif Aslam
- Cinematographer: Ahsan Raza
- Choreographer: Mehar Bano
- Editor: Zeeshan Parwez & Abubakar Siddique
- Stylists:
  - Sara Bharwana (Atif Aslam)
  - Mavi Kayani, Feeha Jamshed, Ayan Khan (Aima Baig)
- Photography: Areesh Zubair
- Sponsorship management: Transgroup
- Sponsors: Tiktok, Red Bull Pakistan

== See also ==
External media

Audio
- Audio on YouTube

Video
- Music video on YouTube
- Performance at the curtain raiser on YouTube
- TikTok version (compilation music video) on YouTube

- List of Pakistan Super League anthems
- Atif Aslam discography
- Aima Baig discography
