= Abdullah Siddiqui =

Pakistani musician

- عبداللہ صدیقی
- Born: 5 August 2000 (age 25); Lahore, Punjab, Pakistan
- Occupations: Singer; Songwriter; Producer
- Years active: 2016–present
- Parents: Shoaib Siddiqui (father); Naureen Siddiqui (mother)
- Musical career
- Genres: Electropop

Abdullah Siddiqui (Urdu: عبداللہ صدیقی; born 5 August 2000) is a Pakistani singer, songwriter, and producer associated with Urdu and English language music. He made his breakthrough appearance on Nescafé Basement season 5 with his song "Resistance", and followed it up by making his album debut with Metannoya in 2019. He further released three albums, namely Heterotopia (2020), dead Beat poets (2021) and dead Beats poets: side B (2021).

In January 2022, he was announced as an associate producer of Coke Studio season 14. This made him the series' youngest ever associate producer. The same month, he produced the 2022 Pakistan Super League anthem "Agay Dekh".

== Life and career ==
=== 2000–2017: Early life and career beginnings ===
Siddiqui was born in Lahore, Punjab to an Urdu-speaking Muslim family. By the age of 11, he had learned to play the guitar. He began producing and releasing English language electronic music on his YouTube account as an independent artist when he was 16. In 2016, he performed a half-hour long set at the Lahore Music Meet. Around that time, his single "Telescope Heart" gained nationwide airplay on CityFM89.

He then worked with independent platforms Forever South and True Brew Records. On the former, he released "Fiction" in December 2017 and "Warm & Unredeemed" with in January 2018.

=== 2018–2020: Nescafé Basement and nominations ===
He released his original song "Resistance" in 2018, for which he picked up a nomination in the Best Emerging Talent (Music) category at the 17th Lux Style Awards. The song was also featured on season 5 of Nescafé Basement.

He sang Peshawar Zalmi's anthem for 2021 Pakistan Super League titled "Kingdom" along with Altamash Sever. In 2021, he was included in the Forbes list of 30 Under 30 - Asia - Entertainment & Sports. On 25 December 2020, Siddiqui released "Be Myself" with singer Aima Baig. The track also featured on his second album, Heterotopia.

=== 2022–present: Coke Studio and Pakistan Super League ===
On 5 January 2022, Siddiqui announced via his Instagram account that he would be an associate producer on season 14 of Coke Studio. On 13 January 2022, it was announced that he would be writing and producing the 2022 Pakistan Super League anthem featuring vocals by Atif Aslam and Aima Baig. The anthem, named "Agay Dekh" was released on 24 January 2022 to a mixed reception.

Siddiqui was also involved with the film score of the 2022 Pakistani film, Joyland, which had its world premiere at the 75th Cannes Film Festival. He was planning to release another album in 2022.

In 2024, he collaborated on Peshawar Zalmi's anthem "Zalmi Yama". The next year, he produced the official song for the 2025 ICC Champions Trophy, titled "Jeeto Baazi Khel Ke".
