= Rastah =

Pakistani streetwear label

- Type: Private
- Industry: Fashion
- Founded: Pakistan (2018; 8 years ago)
- Founders: Zain Ahmad; Ismail Ahmad; Adnan Ahmad
- Headquarters: Lahore, Pakistan
- Products: Clothing
- Website: rastah.co

Rastah (Urdu: راستہ, lit. 'path') is a Pakistani streetwear label established in 2018 by cousins Zain Ahmad, Ismail Ahmad and Adnan Ahmad. The brand combines elements of Western attire with traditional Eastern culture and art.

== History ==
Rastah was founded in 2018 in Lahore, Pakistan. The founders originally planned to sell Pakistani hand-woven fabrics under the Rastah brand, but instead turned to creating clothing that incorporated Pakistani culture into streetwear. They have used traditional Pakistani techniques for the creation of some of their clothes, including using Pakistani hand looms and wood block printing. The brand's creative director, Zain Ahmad has described the city of Lahore as inspiring the designs found in their clothing. Ismail Ahmad came from the marketing background, while Adnan Ahmad from the business and finance. Aslam Mirza serves as an artisan.

In a March 2021 update of PUBG Mobile, Rastah costumes were introduced for the players. In 2022, Zain Ahmad was featured on Forbes 30 under 30 Asia list for globally representation of the Pakistani fashion. In 2023, Rastah became the first Pakistani brand to be featured at London Fashion Week. In 2024, the brand won the Hum Style Award for Designer of the Year – Pret Wear.

The brand has been worn by international celebrities as well, including rapper French Montana, singers Zayn Malik and Justin Bieber, actors Timothée Chalamet, Diljit Dosanjh, Iman Vellani (in an episode of Ms. Marvel) Barry Keoghan, Anil Kapoor, and Riz Ahmed, filmmaker Karan Johar, and wrestler Seth Rollins.
