= Tera Woh Pyar =

Pakistani Urdu song

Song by Shuja Haider
- Language: Urdu
- Released: July 2004
- Genre: Pop
- Length: 5:25
- Label: Indus Music
- Composer: Shuja Haider
- Lyricist: Bilal Maqsood

"Tera Woh Pyar" (Urdu: تیرا وہ پیار transl. That love of yours) is a Pakistani Urdu-language song by Shuja Haider. Originally released in 2004 as a single, the song gained newfound popularity in 2016 when it was performed in Season 9 of Coke Studio.

== Coke Studio version ==
"Tera Woh Pyar"

Single by Asim Azhar and Momina Mustehsan

from the album Coke Studio S9E6
- Language: Urdu
- Released: 16 September 2016
- Genre: Pop
- Length: 7:11
- Label: Coke Studio (Pakistan)
- Composer: Shuja Haider
- Lyricist: Naqash Hayder
- Producers: Coca-Cola and Strings
External media
Audio
- "Tera Woh Pyar" on SoundCloud
Video
- "Tera Woh Pyar" on YouTube

In 2016, Asim Azhar and Momina Mustehsan performed a medley of two of Haider's singles, "Tera Woh Pyar" and "Nawazishein Karam" (Urdu: نوازشیں کرم), during the ninth season of Coke Studio. Haider served as the music director and keyboardist for the Coke Studio version, with additional lyrics provided by Naqash Hyder. This version was released on 16 September 2016.

=== Song credits ===
- Singers: Asim Azhar and Momina Mustehsan
- Music Director: Shuja Haider
- Lyrics By: Naqash Hyder
- Produced and Directed By: Strings
- Houseband: Imran Akhoond (Guitars), Aahad Nayani (Drums), Babar Khanna (Dholak/Tabla), Kamran 'Mannu' Zafar (Bass), Haider Ali (Keyboards/Piano), Kashan Admani (Guitar), Abdul Aziz Kazi (Percussions)
- Guest Musicians: Ustad Tanweer Hussain (Mandolin), Sajid Ali (Flute), Shehroze Hussain (Sitar)
- String Section: Javed Iqbal (Head), Ghulam Abbas, Nadeem Ahmed, M Ilyas, Sakawat Ali, Ghulam Mohammad
- Backing Vocalists: Rachel Viccaji, Shahab Hussain, Nimra Rafiq

== Popularity ==
The Coke Studio version of the song is broadly popular in Pakistan and India. The song surpassed 100 million YouTube views in September 2018, making it the third Coke Studio performance to cross 100 million views after Atif Aslam's rendition of "Tajdar-e-Haram" and Rahat Fateh Ali Khan and Mustehsan's performance of "Afreen Afreen". Additionally, the video made Azhar the fourth Pakistani artist with a song to reach 100 million views on YouTube. As of 7 November 2025, the song has gained 212 million views.

== Reception ==
Azhar has said that he found the public reception to the track to be unexpected and is grateful for it. Bollywood actor Nawazuddin Siddiqui has praised the track, stating in an interview that he listened to the song while filming Manto to mentally prepare himself for each day of shooting.

== See also ==
- Tajdar-e-Haram
- Afreen Afreen
