= Waleed Khalid =

Emirati footballer (born 1992)

Waleed Khalid وليد خالد
Personal information
- Full name: Waleed Khalid Khmais Bakheet
- Date of birth: 2 August 1992 (age 34)
- Place of birth: Emirates
- Height: 1.71 m (5 ft 7 in)
- Position: Winger

Youth career
- 2006–2010: Dubai

Senior career*
| Years | Team | Apps | (Gls) |
| 2010–2017 | Dubai | | |
| 2017–2021 | Ajman | 19 | (1) |
| 2021–2022 | Hatta | 0 | (0) |
- * Club domestic league appearances and goals

Waleed Khalid (Arabic:وليد خالد) (born 2 August 1992) is an Emirati footballer who plays as a winger .

== Career ==
=== Dubai ===
Waleed Khalid started his career at Dubai and is a product of the Dubai's youth system. On 30 September 2010, Waleed Khalid made his professional debut for Dubai against Al-Wahda in the Pro League, replacing Ali Hassan Ahmed.

=== Ajman ===
On 7 August 2017, left Dubai and signed with Ajman. On 15 September 2017, Hussain Abdulrahman made his professional debut for Ajman against Al-Jazira in the Pro League, replacing Mohammed Hilal.
