= Asim Azhar =

Pakistani singer

- عاصم اظہر
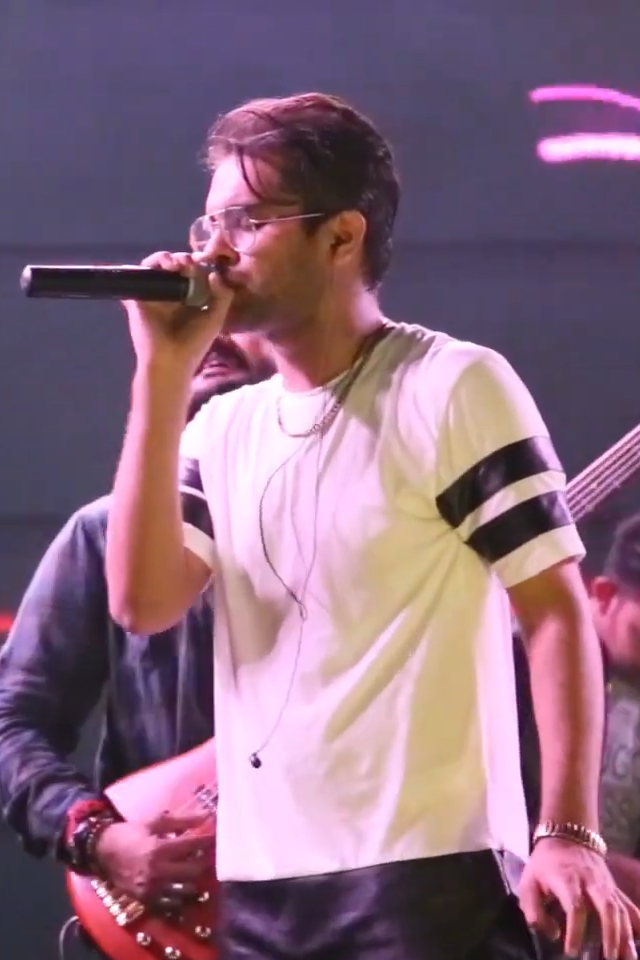
- Azhar in 2018
- Born: 29 October 1996 (age 30); Karachi, Pakistan
- Occupations: Singer; songwriter; musician; actor
- Notable work: Coke Studio Season 8 Coke Studio Season 9 Coke Studio Season 11
- Parent(s): Azhar Hussain (father); Gul-e-Rana (mother)

Asim Azhar (Urdu: عاصم اظہر; born 29 October 1996) is a Pakistani singer, songwriter, musician and an actor. He started his career as a singer on YouTube, covering contemporary Western songs before he became a prominent figure.

== Early life ==
Asim Azhar was born on 29 October 1996 in Karachi into a Punjabi family. His father Azhar Hussain is a musician, music producer, and keyboardist while his mother Gul-e-Rana is an actress.

== Music career ==
Azhar rose to fame through his performances in Coke Studio 8 in 2015. In February 2020, He received The Best Stylish Performer award at PSA in Dubai. His song "Jo Tu Na Mila" featuring Iqra Aziz hit 100M views on YouTube making him the fourth Pakistani singer to cross 100M views after Atif Aslam, Rahat Fateh Ali Khan and Momina Mustehsan in May 2020. "Tera Woh Pyar", sung by Azhar and Momina Mustehsan has also garnered over 140M views as of July 2020.

In 2019, Azhar also had an album with an Indian record company and a Bollywood single planned for release. As a result of the cross-border tensions between India and Pakistan, Azhar's plans with his record company, Universal Music India, came to a halt.

Since 2020, Asim Azhar has performed two title anthems for the Pakistan Super League, and has endorsed team Karachi Kings as well.

== Other work ==
Azhar has appeared as an actor in television series and telefilms. He has also hosted or co-hosted television shows, including the Hum Style Awards in 2018.

== Discography ==
=== Singles ===
Year	Song	Notes
2013	"Whistle"	
2013	"The A Team"	
2014	"Maahi Aaja"	
2014	"Patakha Guddi"	
2014	"Hands in the Air"	
2014	"Sunlay"	
2014	"Soniye"	
2017	"Khuwahish"	
2017	"Teriyaan"	Aima Baig as co-singer
2018	"Hamara Pakistan" (Sindhi)	(Note: Compiled in 2020 album Dhanak Kay Rang by ISPR media productions)
2018	"Jo Tu Na Mila"	Featuring Iqra Aziz
2019	"Humrahi"	
2019	"Tere Liye"	
2020	"Humraah"	
2020	"Sassi"	Featuring Hania Amir
2020	"Tum Tum"	Featuring co-singers Young Stunners, Shamoon Ismail, RAAMIS and TikToker Areeka Haq
2020	"Soneya"	Composed by Qasim Azhar and Lyrics by Kunaal Verma
2020	"Har Ghari Tayyar"	Released on Defence Day (6 September), co-sung by Ali Hamza, Ali Azmat, Ali Noor

=== Television series' soundtracks ===
Year	Title	Song	Network	Composer	Lyricist	Co-singer(s)	Ref(s)
2016	Anabia	"Saajna"		Qasim Azhar			
2017	Pagli	"Ek Pagli Hai Ye"				Aima Baig	
2017	Noor	"Noor"					
2017	Tere Bina	"Tere Bina"		Ayub Khawar		Sara Haider	
2017	Balu Mahi	"Balu Mahi"		Sahir Ali Bagga		Aima Baig	
2019	Ehd-e-Wafa	"Yaarian"	Hum TV	Sahir Ali Bagga		Ali Zafar, Sahir Ali Bagga, Aima Baig	
2020	Ishqiya	"Ishqiya OST"		Himself & Qasim Azhar	Himself, Hassan Ali & Raamis		
2020	Tasveer	"Tasveer OST"		Qasim Azhar	Asim Raza		
2021	Sinf-e-Aahan	"Sinf E Aahan"	ARY Digital	Himself	Himself, Hassan Ali & Ahsan Talish	Zeb Bangash (Note: Collaboration between Inter-Services Public Relations (ISPR) and ARY Digital Network)	
2023	Mannat Murad	"Dil Haara"	Geo Entertainment	Qamar Nashad	Naveed Nashad		
2024	Meem Se Mohabbat	"Beqarar Yeh Dil / Baat"	Hum TV	Shuja Haider		Qirat Haider	
2024	Faraar	"Zinda Hoon"	Green Entertainment	Himself & Hassan Ali	Himself, Hassan Ali & Ashir	Ashir	
2025	Jama Taqseem	"Dooriyan"	Hum TV	Shuja Haider			
2025	Meri Zindagi Hai Tu	"Meri Zindagi Hai Tu"	ARY Digital	Himself	Himself, Nadeem Baig & Kumail Abbas	Sabri Sisters	
2026	Dekh Zara Pyar Se	"Qurbaniyan"	Hum TV	Himself, Qasim Azhar & Hassan Ali	Himself, Kumail Abbas & Qasim Azhar		

=== Coke Studio Pakistan ===
Year	Season	Song	Lyrics	Music	Co-singer(s)
2015	8	"Sohni Dharti"	Masroor Anwer	Strings	Season's artists
2015	8	"Hina Ki Khushbu"		Strings	Samra Khan
2016	9	"Aye Rah-e-Haq Ke Shaheedo"	Saifuddin Saif	Strings	Season's artists
2016	9	"Tera Woh Pyar" "(Nawazishein Karam)"	Naqash Hyder	Shuja Haider	Momina Mustehsan
2018	11	"Hum Dekhenge"	Faiz Ahmed Faiz	Ali Hamza, Zohaib Kazi	Season's artists
2018	11	"Mahi Aaja"	Asim Azhar	Ali Hamza, Zohaib Kazi	Momina Mustehsan
2026	Coke Studio Nu.WAV	"Maheya"	Asim Azhar, AARYAN and Kumail Abbas	Asim Azhar, Azhar Hussain and Rovalio	AARYAN

=== Velo Sound Station ===
- "Sona Chandi"
- "Chahay Jis Shehr" with Sara Haider
- "Marjaniey"

=== Pakistan Super League ===
- "Tayyar Hain" with Ali Azmat, Haroon, Arif Lohar
- "Sab Sitaray Humaray" with Shae Gill, Faris Shafi
- "Ye Hai Karachi" (three versions)
- "Kings' Flow"

== Filmography ==
=== Telefilms ===
Year	Title	Role	Network	Notes	Ref(s)
2014	Pakeezah Coaching Center	Abdul	ARY Digital	Supporting actor	
2017	Noor	Waleed	Urdu 1	Lead role	
2019	Pyaar Kahani	Salaar Irfani	Hum TV	Lead role	

=== Television series ===
Year	Title	Role	Network	Notes	Ref(s)
2017	Pagli	Najam	Hum TV	Lead role	
2019	Meray Dost Meray Yaar	Zain	Geo Entertainment	Lead role	
2021	Sinf-e-Aahan	Captain Nasar	ARY Digital	Supporting actor	

== Awards and nominations ==
Year	Nominee / work	Award	Result	Ref
Sony's MIX Audience Music Awards
2019	"Jo Tu Na Mila"	Best Non-film Track	Nominated	
Hum Style Awards
2020	Most Stylish Performer		Won	
