= Ehd-e-Wafa =

Pakistani television series (2019)

- Official Poster
- عہدِ وَفَا
- Genre: Comedy; Drama; Friendship; Serial drama
- Written by: Mustafa Afridi
- Directed by: Saife Hassan
- Starring: Ahad Raza Mir Ahmed Ali Akbar Osman Khalid Butt Wahaj Ali(For entire cast see below)
- Opening theme: "Ehd-e-Wafa" by Asim Azhar; Ali Zafar; Sahir Ali Bagga; Aima Baig; Rahat Fateh Ali Khan
- Composers: Sahir Ali Bagga; Rahat Fateh Ali Khan
- Country of origin: Pakistan
- Original language: Urdu
- No. of seasons: 1
- No. of episodes: 25

Production
- Producer: Momina Duraid
- Camera setup: Multi-camera
- Running time: Episode 1–24: Approx. 35–40 minutes Last Episode: 1 hour 22 min
- Production companies: MD Productions, ISPR

Original release
- Network: Hum TV
- Release: 22 September 2019 – 15 March 2020

Ehd-e-Wafa (Urdu: عہدِ وفا, lit. 'Pledge of Allegiance') is a Pakistani television series created by Inter-Services Public Relations (ISPR), the media wing of Pakistan Army, and Momina Duraid under MD Productions. The series originally aired on Hum TV, PTV Home and ISPR channel from 22 September 2019 to 15 March 2020. Based on a script by Mustafa Afridi, the series is directed by Saife Hassan. It stars Ahad Raza Mir, Osman Khalid Butt, Ahmed Ali Akbar, Wahaj Ali, Alizeh Shah and Zara Noor Abbas.

It revolves around four school friends with different hopes, goals and aspirations and how their lives change over time as they witness hardships, challenges and betrayal in their friendships and careers. The show was a critical and commercial success, being popular in Pakistan, the UK and India. It was the third most searched in the category of 'Movies & TV' on Google in Pakistan in the Google Trends end-of-year report.

At the 20th Lux Style Awards, it received 3 awards: Best TV Play, Best Emerging Talent for Adnan Samad Khan and Best Original Soundtrack out of the 7 nominations.

== Plot ==
The story revolves around a group of high-spirited friends who help, support, and enjoy one another's company as they overcome hardships in their lives.

Four friends, Saad, Shahzain, Shariq and Shehryar call themselves the SSG (Special 'S' Gang because all their names start with the letter 'S'). They all study at Lawrence College in Murree. Saad's family consists of his father Brigadier (later Major General) Faraz Inam who serves in the army, his mother, and sister Rameen who is an aspiring artist. Shahzain belongs to a rich village family and is the closest to his grandfather, Malik Allahyar. Shariq's family consists of his sister, Ghazala and his widowed mother. Shehryar's father is a bandmaster. They often bunk hostel together at night and got caught by their hostel warden Firdous Baig once.

On the other hand, there are Dua and Rani. Rani is a vivacious girl, who comes from a rich village family. After three years, she has yet to pass her Intermediate exams, which she ultimately doesn't. Dua comes from Rawalpindi and is seen visiting her cousins, Aisha and Raheel in Murree. Raheel is obnoxious and is over-protective of Dua, which she immensely dislikes and tries to avoid him.

Despite receiving warnings from the headmaster of the college, the SSG still bunk college and this time, they accidentally run into Dua and her cousins. Saad immediately recognizes Dua, while Shariq and Shehryar run away from the scene. Saad tells Shahzain that he had seen Dua twice before and has a crush on her but he didn't have the courage to tell her about his feelings. Shahzain encourages Saad to go after her and get to know her name since he didn't. They follow her and eventually get to know her name.

The next day, they meet Dua again after Shariq spots her with her cousins and tells the other three, who immediately rush to her. As Shahzain and Shehryar begin to introduce themselves to Dua and tell her about Saad, Raheel pushes Saad, thinking he was harassing Dua and a physical fight follows. The police arrive and take Saad and Raheel into custody, while Shahzain and Shehryar flee, and are later joined by Shariq.

Dua's parents file a complaint against Saad, in the name of harassment. This causes a rift between the SSG. Shariq refuses to be involved in their tactics anymore. Saad slaps Shahzain, because he made a fuss in front of Dua. In the end, Saad, Shahzain and Shehryar are rusticated from the hostel. Since Shariq wasn't directly involved in the incident, no action is taken against him.

The four friends now go on to lead their separate lives. Shahzain doesn't show up for his exams and slowly transforms into an angry young man. Saad is confused between choosing Army or Medical as his profession but ultimately joins the Army after finding Dua submitting her application at the same medical college. Later, they meet at a park where Dua softens up when she overhears him scolding his pet Zorro for chasing her.

Shahzain and Shehryar then visit Saad, wanting to reconcile but Saad humiliates the two and asks them to leave. Saad later departs for PMA. Upon arriving at PMA, Saad meets Gulzar Hussain and develops a good friendship with him.

On the other hand, Shahzain decides to marry Dua as revenge on Saad. However Dua's parents reject his proposal. Shehryar confronts Shahzain and stops him from marrying Dua, and makes him realize his mistakes. Then Shahzain, Saad, Shariq, and Shehryar meet to sort out all misunderstandings. But learning that Shahzain went to Dua's house, Saad confronts him. Shahzain feels humiliated again. His marriage is fixed with Rani. He only invites Shariq and Shehryar to his wedding but when he overhears the two talking about Saad, it angers him. Shariq and Shehryar leave realizing that Shahzain only viewed them as commodities and not friends.

In their next meeting Saad and Dua are confronted by Raheel. Dua walks off angrily and goes home. Raheel proposes to Dua for marriage but she refuses and tells her father to trust her that Saad is just a friend. She then tells Saad she won't contact him until they both establish their careers. Raheel's parents then invite Dua's parents and insist on their marriage but Dua's father refuses. On the way home, Dua's parents meet with an accident. Dua's father passes away and her mother becomes disabled. Her cousin blackmails her into marrying him as he finds out she is adopted. Dua agrees but then exposes him in front of his parents. Dua and her mother move to Abbottabad to live near her medical college. Saad is shown to pass out of PMA with a sword of honour. Later he finds out about Dua's father.

Shahzain is shown to be contesting in the by-elections. Shariq's YouTube channel has been so well established that he is offered a job as a news anchor at a well-established channel. He accepts the job after declining at first and selects Ramsha (a former news reporter who became friends with him) as producer of his show.

Shahzain wins his elections and becomes an MNA. Shariq achieves success as a news anchor. After passing out from PMA, Saad starts his army duties and visits Dua. He helps Dua in setting up her new home. They grow closer to each other and eventually meet each other's parents. Saad starts planning his wedding and bumps into Shahzain while completing a wedding-related task. They confront each other and eventually reconcile.

Meanwhile, Shehryar is appointed as an Assistant Commissioner and works with Shariq to help free one of their college friends who has been wrongly imprisoned due to a mafia gang. Shariq and Shehryar manage to successfully free him. All four friends get together for Saad's wedding and are seen teasing Saad. On the night of the wedding, it is revealed that Dua has been appointed as an army doctor and walks down the aisle in her uniform leaving Saad in awe.

Later, Shahzain is attacked by his presumed rivals. Saad, on the other hand, is appointed in LOC Kashmir. Dua informs him that she is pregnant. Shahzain wins the elections but Shehreyar is suspicious. He confronts Shahzain on learning that he staged Choudhary Vakar (Rani's brother) for his attempted murder to win the elections. Shariq and Ramsha are going to marry each other. Shariq advises Shehryar to go to Masooma and apologize to her for his behavior, as she had previously proposed Shehryar but he rebuked her. Shahzain apologizes to Rani, his grandfather and Shehryar. Thereafter, Rani reveals her pregnancy to him.

Due to high alert on the LOC all four boys stand up for their country. Shahzain went on a live show of India. Shariq covers media and tells all of Pakistan about the problems at the LOC. Shehryar tells people to go away from the LOC. Saad is given an operation to retrieve an injured soldier from the battleground. He is eventually shot in the process but manages to complete his mission. He is then taken to the hospital where he recovers. At the end all friends visit their College and advise the students on how to serve the country through various fields of opportunities.

== Cast ==
Name	Role	Notes
Main characters
Ahad Raza Mir	Captain Saad Faraz	Pakistan Army Officer and Dua's Husband
Osman Khalid Butt	Malik Shahzain Khan	MNA (Politician)
Ahmed Ali Akbar	Shahryar "Sherry" Afzal	AC (Assistant Commissioner)
Wahaj Ali	Shariq "Shark" Habib	Journalist
Alizeh Shah	Captain Dr. Dua Saad	Saad's love interest and later wife
Zara Noor Abbas	Rani Shahzain	Shahzain's love interest and later wife
Supporting characters
Hajra Yamin	Ramsha Jaffer	Shariq's colleague and love interest
Momina Iqbal	Masooma	Shahryar's cousin and love interest
Adnan Samad Khan	Captain Gulzar	Saad's army friend
Syed Muhammad Ahmed	Malik Allahyar Khan	Shahzain's grandfather
Vaneeza Ahmed	Faryal Faraz	Saad's mother
Komal Meer	Rameen	Saad's sister
Faraz Inam Siddiqui	Faraz Inam	Saad's father and Brigadier General/Major General of Pakistan Army
Ali Ammar	Kashif	A new student in Army
Khalifa Sajeer Uddin	Firdous Baig	Warden of Lawrence College Hostel
Mian Wassam Waheed	Shahid Ahmed	Duaa's adoptive father
Ejaz Ahmed Niazi	Master	Dean Lawrence College
Azeem Sajjad	Malik Yar Mohammad	Shahzain's father
Naeema Butt	Ghazala Habib	Shariq's sister
Naghma		Shariq's mother
Anjum Habibi	Laal Khan	Shahryar's father
Munazzah Arif	Shahzain's mother	
Aadi Khan	Malik Shahzaib	Shahzain's brother
Humayun Saeed	Humayun	Saad's Senior Major/Lieutenant Colonel (Special Appearance)
Afraz Rasool	Ameesh Goswami	Indian TV anchor (Special Appearance)

== Production ==
=== Development and background ===
Ehd-e-Wafa was co-developed by Hum TV's senior producer Momina Duraid and ISPR. Saife Hassan was chosen as a director who previously directed acclaimed serials for the channel such as Belapur Ki Dayan and Sammi. The story was written by Mustafa Afridi who previously wrote the screenplay of period drama Aangan. To add authenticity to the script, Afridi spent a month researching at the Pakistan Military Academy. It marked fourth collaboration of the writer and director, lastly collaborated for 2016-17's mega-hit Sang-e-Mar Mar.

=== Casting ===
Producer Momina Duraid and DG ISPR Asif Ghafoor mutually choose the cast which includes Ahad Raza Mir, Osman Khalid Butt, Ahmed Ali Akbar and Wahaj Ali as male leads. Zara Noor Abbas was selected to portray one of the lead roles, Rani. Alizeh Shah known for her recent notable appearances in channel's hits Baandi, Daldal and Jo Tu Chahey was chosen to play the other female lead Duaa. Model-turned actor Vaneeza Ahmed and PTV actor Faraz Inam Siddiqui were selected to play the parents of Saad. Notably, Siddiqui had previously appeared in the 1980s production Alpha Bravo Charlie, a series often mistakenly believed to be the original inspiration for Ehd-e-Wafa, a claim later denied by Afridi. Hajra Yamin and Momina Iqbal were selected to portray the parallel female leads of Ramsha and Masooma respectively. Adnan Samad Khan was cast in the comic role of Gulzar, which marked his television debut. Cake actor Syed Mohammad Ahmed was chosen to play the supporting role of Malik Allahyar while Anjum Habibi for the role of Shehryar's father. Humayun Saeed was cast as guest appearance for the last episode.

=== Filming and production locations ===
The drama serial was shot in 16 cities. The college sequences were shot in Lawrence College Ghora Gali (Murree) while sequences of Saad's academy were shot in Pakistan Military Academy (Abbottabad). Other cities include Lahore, Chakwal, Rawalpindi / Islamabad, Gujrat and Bahawalpur. The shooting lasted for more than 9 months.

== Reception ==
Season	No. of episodes	Originally broadcast (Pakistan)	
Season	No. of episodes	First episode	Last episode
1	26	22 September 2019	15 March 2020

=== Television rating (TRPs) ===
Ep#	airing date	TRP	ref
1	22 September 2019	11.0	
2	29 September 2019	14.7	
3	6 October 2019	11.6	
5	20 October 2019	11.6	
7	3 November 2019	11.1	
8	10 November 2019	9.6	
10	24 November 2019	10.1	
13	15 December 2019	9.0	
15	29 December 2019	10.7	
16	5 January 2020	10.3	
17	13 January 2020	8.8	
18	19 January 2020	11.6	
20	2 February 2020	12.1	

=== Critical reception ===
Reviewing of initial episodes for Youlin Magazine, the reviewer praised the chemistry of the stars and execution of the serial stating, "Each character’s individual personality comes across as fully developed from the first episode. Their hilarious first scene lets their chemistry shine through, and propels the audience into the world of the Special Services Group (SSG), one of the most otherwise secretive sections of the Army". The reviewer also praised the performance of Zara Noor Abbas and said that she gives the audience an exciting introduction, with her loud, clever, and bubbly disposition.

While reviewing the first two episodes, Sheeba Khan of The Express Tribune rated the series 4/5. The reviewer praised the performances of the male protagonists, Afridi's "light-hearted comic" script. She further criticised the casting of Butt and Akbar as late teens, acting of Abbas and Shah with labelling the former's acting as "Irritating" and "annoying".

Muhammad Ali of Daily Times praised the Afridi's script especially the characters' development and their journey and Hassan's direction.

While reviewing finale of the series, Buraq Shabbir wrote for The News International, "Ehd e Wafa stood out for tackling an unusual genre, with male protagonists, their struggle and friendship being the highlight of the drama." She further praised the women portrayal in the series due to the impactful characters.

Wahaj Ali and Adnan Samad Khan received major praise from the critics due to their respective roles of Shariq and Gulzar, turned out a breakthrough project for them.

=== Controversy ===
A petition was filed against the drama serial in Lahore High Court. The petitioner's plea: the drama showed a negative image of politicians and media personnel. After which Justice Shahid Waheed declared the petition inadmissible and decided to reject it. He remarked that the petitioners should first apply to PEMRA and if there is no hearing, they can approach the court.

In March 2025, content creater Adeel Afzal critiqued the narrative of the series in a video for being biased especially the portrayal of media and politicians by the characters portrayed by Wahaj Ali and Osman Khalid Butt respectively. The video was then censored, deleting from the social media.

== Soundtracks ==
Ehd-e-Wafa

Soundtrack album by various artists
- Genre: Soundtrack
- Length: 9:32
- Labels: MD Productions; ISPR media productions
- Producers: Momina Duraid; ISPR

All lyrics are written by Imran Raza.

Original Soundtrack
No.	Title	Music	Singer(s)	Length
1.	"Yaarian"	Sahir Ali Bagga	Ali Zafar, Sahir Ali Bagga, Asim Azhar, Aima Baig	4:32
2.	"Ehd E Wafa"	Rahat Fateh Ali Khan	Rahat Fateh Ali Khan	5:00
Total length:				9:32

== Broadcast ==
Ehd-e-Wafa originally premiered on 22 September 2019. Ehd-e-Wafa airs a weekly episode on every Sunday succeeding Anaa, starting from its premiere date, with time slot of 8:00 pm. It was aired on Hum Europe in UK, on Hum TV USA in USA and Hum TV Mena on UAE, with same timings and premiered date. All International broadcasting aired the series in accordance with their standard timings.

It was simultaneously broadcast on state channel PTV Home with the same timings. The show was dubbed in Pashto and is currently broadcast by Hum Pashto 1 with the same title.

== Awards and nominations ==
Year	Award	Category	Recipient	Result	Ref.
2020	1st Pakistan International Screen Awards	Best Television Play	Ehd-e-Wafa	Nominated	
2020	1st Pakistan International Screen Awards	Best Television Writer	Mustafa Afridi	Nominated	
2020	1st Pakistan International Screen Awards	Best Television Actor in a Comedy Role	Adnan Samad Khan	Won	
2020	Hum Social Media Awards	Most Popular On Screen Couple	Osman Khalid Butt and Zara Noor Abbas	Nominated	
2021	4th International Pakistan Prestige Awards	Best TV Series	Ehd-e-Wafa	Won	
2021	4th International Pakistan Prestige Awards	Best Director TV	Saife Hassan	Won	
2021	4th International Pakistan Prestige Awards	Best Actor Male TV	Ahad Raza Mir	Nominated	
2021	4th International Pakistan Prestige Awards	Best Actor Female TV	Alizeh Shah	Nominated	
2021	4th International Pakistan Prestige Awards	Best Negative Role TV	Osman Khalid Butt	Nominated	
2021	4th International Pakistan Prestige Awards	Best Supporting Role TV	Adnan Samad Khan	Nominated	
2021	4th International Pakistan Prestige Awards	Best OST of the Year	Ehd-e-Wafa	Won	
2021	4th International Pakistan Prestige Awards	Best On-Screen TV Couple	Ahad Raza Mir and Alizeh Shah	Nominated	
2021	20th Lux Style Awards	Best TV Play	Momina Duraid and ISPR	Won	
2021	20th Lux Style Awards	Best TV Director	Saife Hassan	Nominated	
2021	20th Lux Style Awards	Best TV Writer	Mustafa Afridi	Nominated	
2021	20th Lux Style Awards	Best Actor – Critics' Choice	Ahad Raza Mir	Nominated	
2021	20th Lux Style Awards	Best Actor – Viewer’s Choice	Ahad Raza Mir	Nominated	
2021	20th Lux Style Awards	Best Emerging Talent in TV	Adnan Samad Khan	Won	
2021	20th Lux Style Awards	Best Original Soundtrack	Rahat Fateh Ali Khan	Won	
2022	8th Hum Awards	Best Drama Serial (2020)	Saife Hassan and Momina Duraid	Won	

== See also ==
- Team Muhafiz
- Inter-Services Public Relations media productions
- Hum TV
- PTV Home
