= Aima Baig =

Pakistani singer (born 1995)

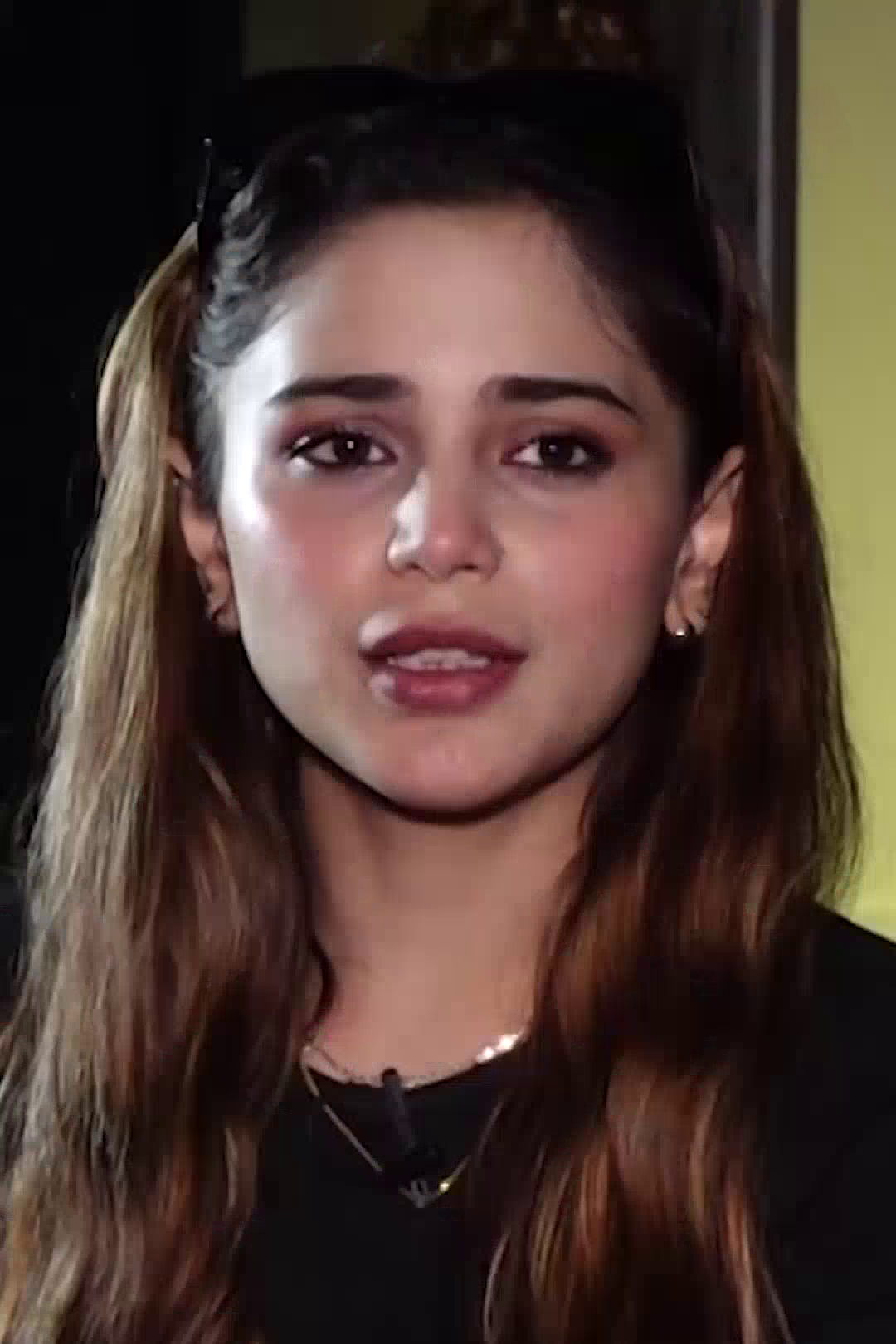
- Baig in 2023
- Born: Aima Noor-ul Ain Baig; 10 March 1995 (age 31); Rahim Yar Khan, Punjab, Pakistan
- Education: University of Lahore
- Occupations: Singer; model
- Years active: 2013–present
- Spouse: Zain Ahmad (m. 2025)
- Musical career
- Instruments: Vocals; guitar; piano

Aima Noor-ul Ain Baig (Note: Urdu: آئمہ نور العین بیگ) (born 10 March 1995) is a Pakistani singer, known for her playback singing in films and television, including Lahore Se Aagey, Teefa in Trouble, and Chupan Chupai. She has also notably appeared on Mazaaq Raat, Coke Studio Pakistan, and at the musical occasions of the Pakistan Super League. She has been awarded three Lux Style Awards and a Tamgha-e-Fakhre-Imtiaz.

== Early life ==
Born in 1995 in Rahim Yar Khan, Pakistan, Aima Baig was raised in Oman. She attributes her music interest to the support of her mother, which was sparked at the age of six when her mother overheard her karaoke performance. Her father was an electrical engineer. She completed her Bachelor of Film and Television at the School of Creative Arts, University of Lahore, where she also acted in theatre. She has two sisters and two brothers and is the fourth child of her family.

== Career ==
Aima Baig started working at a call centre in her teenage years. In 2013, she participated in a Naat competition on television. Later in 2015, she collaborated with the Inter-Services Public Relations for a tribute song to the victims of the 2014 Peshawar school massacre, composed by Sahir Ali Bagga.

She started her mainstream career by co-hosting Pakistani television comedy talk show Mazaaq Raat between 2015–2017, where she also performed a few songs. She rose to fame as a playback singer for Saba Qamar in the 2016 film Lahore Se Aagey, for which composer Shiraz Uppal had approached and motivated her. The soundtrack included "Kalabaaz Dil", which earned her her first Lux Style Award.

In 2018, she was the playback singer for Maya Ali in Teefa in Trouble, and she won another Lux Style Award for the song "Sadqa" from the 2017 film Chupan Chupai. She was also the playback for the item numbers "Kaif O Suroor" in Na Maloom Afraad 2 and "Khabon Main" in Kaaf Kangana, featuring Sadaf Kanwal and Neelam Muneer, respectively.

She went on to sing the theme songs for several television serials, such as Ishq Aatish Hai, Romeo Weds Heer, Ehd-e-Wafa, Raaz-e-Ulfat, "O Zalim" from Fitrat, "Koi Aisa Dard" from Fitoor, and "Ja Tujhe Maaf Kiya" from Do Bol. She appeared in three seasons of Coke Studio Pakistan during 2017–2019, and collaborated with Bagga on well-received tracks each year: "Baazi", "Malang", and "Dhola". She also performed in two seasons of Velo Sound Station, in 2020 and 2023.

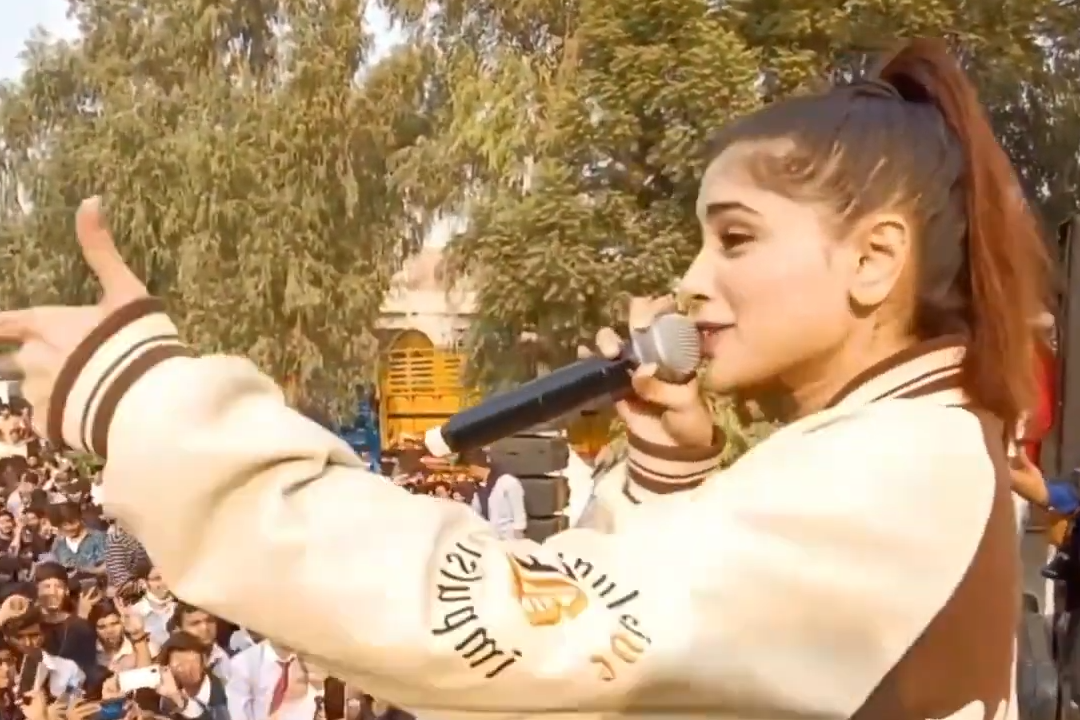
Baig at a concert in Multan

She has collaborated in different genres and has featured in a number of music videos and singles with Asim Azhar, Farhan Saeed, Ali Zafar, Nabeel Shaukat Ali, Abdullah Siddiqui, and many others. (Note: Summary of pieces of information is extracted from journalist Omair Alavi, The Express Tribune, and GoodTimes.com.pk.) She has also performed at the award ceremonies, including the Lux Style Awards, Hum Style Awards, and Pakistan International Screen Awards.

Additionally, Baig is regarded as one of the most appearing singers at the Pakistan Super League (PSL) events. She was a co-singer for the PSL's four title anthems: "Groove Mera" in 2021, "Agay Dekh" in 2022, "Khul Ke Khel" in 2024, and "Khelenge Beat Pe" in 2026. She had also endorsed two regional teams in the league: Quetta Gladiators in 2018 and Peshawar Zalmi in 2025. She paid tribute to Nazia Hassan during the 2019 PSL, and performed "Qaumi Taranah" at the 2023 PSL opening ceremony. She has also performed at the inaugural of the 2023 Asia Cup at Multan Cricket Stadium and before the 2025 ICC Champions Trophy at the inaugural of the renovated Gaddafi Stadium in Lahore.

== Style and influence ==
Aima Baig's singing style incorporates elements of contemporary music, including Western music and Punjabi music. (Note: Pieces of critical commentary are extracted from The Nation, 24 Digital, Business Recorder, Minute Mirror, Geo News, and The News.) Her singing style for the song "Kalabaaz Dil" was inspired by Rekha Bhardwaj. (Note: Claim and commentry is extracted from The News and ARY Digital.) Maliha Rehman of Dawn called her in 2018 a "new female singer with far greater critical acclaim". In August 2019, she was awarded the Tamgha-e-Fakhre-Imtiaz by then Governor of Punjab, Pakistan, Chaudhry Sarwar. She won the Pakistan International Screen Award for Singer of the Year 2020 for "Te Quiero Mucho", a song inspired by Latin music. Commenting on the song, Munnazzah Raza of Dawn Images noted her "delicate yet charismatic voice", while Maheen Sabeeh of The News called her "a potential pop singer of the future".

She also claimed to be inspired by Ariana Grande, whom some of her fans think she looks like due to some of her photoshoots and hairstyling with a ponytail. She also uploaded a cover version of Grande's song "We Can't Be Friends". (Note: Pieces of information, claim, and commentary are extracted from Geo News, The Express Tribune, Daily Jang, and Aik News.) She also paid tribute to Farida Khanum at the 20th Lux Style Awards. She claimed that she covered Kaifi Khalil's "Kahani Suno 2.0" with his permission because it had motivated her in her low times. (Note: Claim is extracted from DW Urdu, Independent Urdu, and Dunya News.)

She was the most-streamed female artist in Pakistan on Spotify in 2021. She was listed in HELLO! Pakistan's Hot 100 Wavemakers in 2023, and won the Lux Style Award for Most Stylish Musician for her music video "Satrangi" in 2025. In 2024, her comments faced online trolling and sparked a social media debate, when she claimed that singer Nehaal Naseem had copied her style, (Note: Claim and commentry is extracted from ProPakistani, Daily Pakistan, and Dunya News.) and when singer Sara Raza Khan criticized her for using an autotune, which she denied after uploading an unplugged singing video. (Note: Controversy is extracted from Dawn Images, BBC Urdu, and The Friday Times.)

== Personal life ==
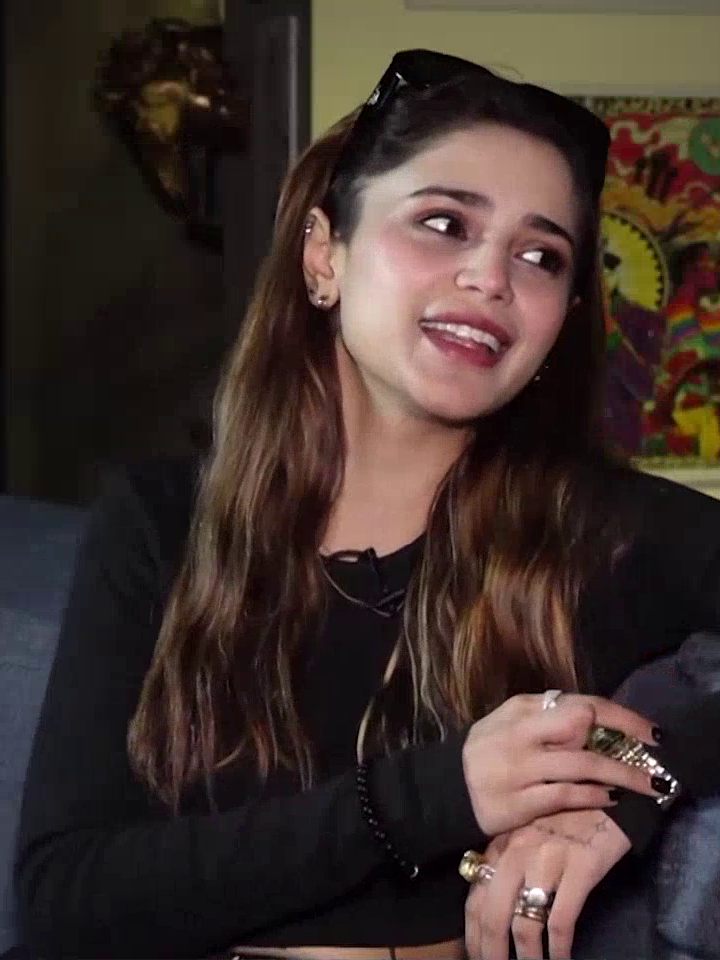
Baig in 2023

In 2017, Aima Baig's mother died from cancer after being afflicted for six years. Her disease inspired Baig's participation in the fundraising for Shaukat Khanum Memorial Cancer Hospital and Research Centre. She had also performed the cover of "Summer Wine" with Mubasher Lucman at a charity event in August 2015.

In March 2021, she announced her engagement to Shahbaz Shigri; they had been dating since they met while filming Parey Hut Love. However, in September 2022, she confirmed that the couple had broken up, though that they stayed friends. In September 2024, she began sharing pictures with Zain Ahmad, founder of the fashion brand Rastah, (Note: Claims and information extracted from 24 Digital, Samaa TV, ProPakistani, and Hum News.) and they married in August 2025. She announced her intention to launch a MeToo movement in Pakistan in 2024.

== Awards and nominations ==
Year	Nominee / work	Award	Result	Ref
Lux Style Awards
2017	"Kalabaaz Dil"	Best Playback Singer (Female)	Won	
2018	"Sadqa"	Best Playback Singer (Female)	Won	
2018	"Kaif o Suroor"	Best Playback Singer (Female)	Nominated	
2021	"Raaz-e-Ulfat"	Best TV OST	Nominated	
2021	"O Zalim"	Best TV OST	Nominated	
2022	"Na Cher Malangaan Nu"	Song of the Year	Nominated	
2023	Most Stylish Musician		Nominated	
2025	"Satrangi"	Most Stylish Musician	Won	
Pakistan International Screen Awards
2020	"Dhola"	Best Song	Nominated	
2020	"Dhola"	Best Song Critics Choice	Nominated	
2020	"Ja Tujhe Maaf Kiya"	Best Soundtrack	Nominated	
2021	"Raaz-e-Ulfat"	Best Soundtrack	Nominated	
2021	"Te Quiero Mucho"	Singer of the Year (Jury)	Won	
Hum Style Awards
2024	Most Stylish Performer		Nominated	
