= List of Pakistani hip-hop musicians =

This is a list of notable Pakistani hip hop musicians. This list includes artists who have been important to the genre.

- Bohemia
- Imran Khan
- Young Stunners
- Ali Gul Pir
- Lodhi (rapper)
- Adil Omar
- Zack Knight
- Talha Anjum
- Talha Yunus
- Faris Shafi
- Lazarus (rapper)

== See also ==
- Pakistani music
