= Pakistani hip-hop =

Music genre

Pakistani hip hop
- Stylistic origins: Hip hop; Pakistani music; Urdu
- Cultural origins: Early 1990s
- Typical instruments: Vocals; turntables; sampler; keyboards

Subgenres
- Punjabi rap; Sindhi rap; Pashto rap; Balochi rap

Other topics
- Hip hop

Pakistani hip-hop is a music genre in Pakistan, heavily influenced by merging American hip-hop style beats with Pakistani poetry. The genre was initially dominated by English and Punjabi, but in recent years has expanded to include Urdu, Sindhi, Pashto, and Balochi.

== History ==
The contemporary hip-hop and rap movement in Pakistan emerged from globalization of American hip hop in the early 1990s. Some Pakistani artists began experimenting with rap and hip hop as early as 1993. In particular, the rise in popularity of Eminem in the late 1990s and 50 Cent in the early 2000s influenced many of today's hip hop artists in Pakistan such as Party Wrecker (Mustafa Khan) of the Pashto rap group Fortitude, as well as Qzer (Qasim Naqvi) and DirtJaw.

The song "Pani da Bulbula" by classical singer Yaqoob Atif Bulbula, released in 1979 is commonly acknowledged as the first song in Pakistan to feature desi Punjabi rap. The singer Fakhar-e-Alam later released the first ever commercial Pakistani rap album Rap Up in 1993 featuring single "Bhangra Pao", a fusion of bhangra and rap music which became a major headliner on Pakistani music charts. The hit 1995 song "Billo De Ghar" by Abrar-ul-Haq also featured rapping.

=== Languages ===
==== Punjabi Rap ====
It is known that Punjabi rap existed in Pakistan even before 2000, used by folk singers and street artists to amaze audiences with how fast they could speak Punjabi, although it was not labeled as rap.

Punjabi rap was notably popularized by Pakistani American rapper, Bohemia, a Punjabi Christian, born in Karachi, schooled in Peshawar, and raised in the working-class minority communities of San Francisco. Bohemia's music emerged from personal experiences, such as seeing his best friend murdered and several others sent to jail. In 2002, Bohemia released his debut album 'Vich Pardesan De (In the Foreign Land)' that gained a lot of popularity in desi diaspora all around the world. Later in 2006, Bohemia released his second album Pesa Nasha Pyar (Punjabi for "Money Drugs Love") commercially backed by Universal Music. Pesa Nasha Pyar stood out as lyrically groundbreaking. With Universal's distribution network, Bohemia found a ready market among Pakistanis, both in the diaspora and in Pakistan itself. This proved to be a catalyst for the local Punjabi rap scene in Pakistan and ignited the fire in younger generation of many Pakistani rappers. The early wave of Punjabi rap in Pakistan had a lot of artists such as Xpolymer Dar, Billy X, AK The Punjabi Rapper, Young Desi, Desi Addicts, Peace Grip, Zammu Faisalabadi, M.Zhe, FreeStyle Co (FSC), Blac Panther & D-Naar. Many of these artists stopped making music due to non-acceptance and not being able to generate enough income to support themselves. While many of Punjabi rappers continued to release their music independently on social websites such as Orkut, Myspace and ReverbNation, a major chunk of that music can still be searched and streamed.

In 2012, a popular Pakistani television program Coke Studio featured Bohemia on the track School di kitab which gained a lot of positive responses from rap and non-rap listeners alike all over Pakistan.

In 2017, Shoaib Mansoor, a Pakistani television and film director released the OST Power Di Game of his forthcoming Lollywood movie Verna that contained Punjabi rap voiced by Xpolymer Dar, making him the first rapper in Pakistan to be featured in a Lollywood movie and further popularizing the rap genre.

There is also a strong hip-hop scene centered around Rawalpindi. Notable artists include Pindi Boyz and Osama Com Laude among others. Com Laude, whose song Pindi Aye went viral has performed internationally, collaborating with artists as diverse as Edward Maya, Ali Zafar, Major Lazer, and Valentino Khan.

==== Urdu Rap ====
The Urdu rap genre is recently the fastest growing in the country. The majority of Urdu rappers are heavily influenced by Bohemia, a famous Punjabi rapper. In 2012, Urdu rap first gained popularity after rapper Faris Shafi released one of his controversial songs "Awaam". The song was a social commentary on Pakistan's governance and hit 3.5 Million views. His other renowned songs include Muskura, Jawab de, Waasta and several others.

Subsequently, the genre gained increasing popularity after a hip-hop music duo Young Stunners, consisting of Talha Anjum and Talha Yunus when they released their debut single Burger-e-Karachi. A satirical take on the westernized urban elites and upper-middle-class people of Karachi. The song became instantly viral. Following which they threw back-to-back hits among which are Maila Majnu and Laam se Chaura. They led the Malir Rap Boys and have collaborated with artists such as Asim Azhar. They have also collaborated with Indian rappers such as the Indian rapper KR$NA for the song "Quarantine".

==== Pashto Rap ====
In 2011, a rap group from Peshawar released a track named Pukhtoon Core by Fortitude. This was the first time anyone made a rap song in the Pashto language. Soon the band started making hits like No Borders, Lewani, Outrageous, Alongside Rap Demon and in 2019 they finally dropped Era of Pushto which was a comeback music and made waves across TikTok, Recently, Fortitude Pukhtoon Core released the official Anthem of Peshawar Zalmi for HBL PSL.

==== Sindhi Rap ====
The Sindhi hip-hop scene draws on a history of linguistic nationalism of Sindhis. Many Sindhi rap artists are attempting to resurrect and mainstream Sindhi culture in Pakistan using hip hop. Many Sindhi rap artists are also continuing the long Sindhi tradition of Sufi poetry by including them in rhymes. Ali Gul Pir's Waderai Ka Beta, Meer Janweri Piyar Jo Siphai and others are recent Sindhi rap songs that have gone mainstream and show signs of the genre expanding beyond Punjabi.

==== Balochi Rap ====
Lyari Underground (L.U.G.) is from Lyari, as the name suggests. Currently playing at local festivals, L.U.G doesn't plan on stopping anytime in the near future. Breakout artists like Sami Amiri, Anas Baloch & Eva B are promoting the Lyari/Balochi culture through hip-hop.

== Artists ==
=== Urdu rappers ===
- Talha Anjum
- Talhah Yunus
- Faris Shafi
- CHEN-K

=== Punjabi rappers ===
- Bohemia
- Fakhar-e-Alam
- Imran Khan
- Young Desi
- Zack Knight

=== Bilingual rappers ===
- Lazarus (English & Urdu)
- Osama Karamat (English & Urdu)
- Pindi Boyz (English, Urdu & Punjabi)
- Adil Omar (English & Urdu)
- Lodhi (rapper) (Punjabi & Urdu)

=== Sindhi rappers ===
- Ali Gul Pir

== See also ==
- Music of Pakistan
- List of Pakistani Hip Hop Musicians
