= X Dekho =

2025 Pakistan Super League official anthem

- Anthem cover

Promotional single by various artists
- Language: Urdu; Punjabi; English
- Released: 2 April 2025
- Recorded: 2025
- Studio: Lightingale
- Genre: Stadium anthem
- Length: 3:44
- Label: Lightingale
- Songwriters: Ali Zafar; Abrar Ul Haq; Talha Anjum
- Producers: Ali Zafar; Ali Mustafa

Pakistan Super League anthems chronology
"Khul Ke Khel" (2024)	"X Dekho" (2025)	"Khelenge Beat Pe" (2026)
Music Video
- Directed by: Babar Sheikh; Rameez Khokar (choreographer)
- Produced by: Sumair Tariq; Merium Yousuf
- Cinematography: Abu Bakr; Talha
- Edited by: Mishal Yousuf
- Production company: Khayal Films
- Release date: 2025
- Running time: 3:48

"X Dekho" (transl. Watch Decade) is a 2025 song, recorded and produced at Lightingale Records. Performed by Ali Zafar, Abrar Ul Haq, Talha Anjum, and Natasha Baig, it served as the official anthem of the tenth season of the Pakistan Super League.

== Background and release ==
On 23 March 2025, it was reported that the season's anthem was in the final stage of preparation. Two days later, the Pakistan Cricket Board (PCB) announced that Ali Zafar had joined in for the fifth time to record and release the anthem. However, Multan Sultans' owner Ali Tareen showed disappointment upon Zafar's repeated selection, stating to use other artists instead. Soon after, the artist line-up was revealed. CEO PSL Salman Naseer said that these four artist will reflect four genres and vocal ranges from Pakistan, and the anthem is designed to celebrate the decade of the league.

While Talha Anjum was previously featured in the anthem for the sixth season, Abrar Ul Haq and Natasha Baig are debuting. Baig told The News that the reason PCB turns to Zafar is that the fans have consistently connected with his anthems making it his legacy. She showed excitement for strong female representation in the anthem.

The anthem was released on 2 April 2025 across multiple social media platforms.

== Reception ==
The anthem drew mixed reactions, with critics and audiences acknowledging some of its strong elements but criticising its execution. (Note: Pieces of information and commentary for this paragraph are gathered from Dunya News, The Express Tribune, Daily Times, Brandsynario, and Behtareen.) While some praised the artists collaboration, many argued it failed to meet expectations as a "decade-defining" track despite pre-release hype. While some noted Ali Zafar's dominant role, yet others argued his performance did not match his earlier anthem standards. Uneven contributions were highlighted, particularly Natasha Baig's limited vocal presence. While some solely praised Talha Anjum's rap segment and Abrar Ul Haq's Punjabi segment, others criticized their presence as disjointed rather than integrated. The anthem's reliance on Punjabi lyrics and minimal regional representation sparked debates about its reflection of nationwide identity. Additionally, the title phrase was questioned for its thematic relevance to cricket.

A reviewer in Dawn concluded that the anthem lacks the "X factor" by leaving a desire of being an "ear-worm" required for "firing up the blood", despite its "usual upbeat rhythm", and "fails to be memorable". Ali A. Rizvi of The Jungle Today remarked it as "a decade-defining anthem that defined nothing".

== Opening ceremony ==
On 11 April 2025, Rawalpindi Cricket Stadium hosted its first ever ceremony for the league's tenth season. Zainab Abbas presented the show, while Hamza Ali Abbasi delivered a speech. It was opened by a jet pack flyer, who handed the tournament's trophy to Salman Naseer on stage. The ceremony included "Qaumi Taranah" rendered by children from Surtaal Music Academy, Sufi performance by Abida Parveen, rap show by Young Stunners, and cultural act by Ali Zafar. Next, the title anthem was played with Zafar, Natasha Baig, Talha Anjum, and Abrar Ul Haq taking stage. The show was closed by fireworks. (Note: Pieces of information are gathered from Geo News, Daily Pakistan, Hum News, and The Express Tribune.)

== See also ==
External media

Audio
- Audio on YouTube

Video
- Music video on YouTube
- Opening ceremony performance on YouTube

- List of Pakistan Super League anthems
