= Waderai Ka Beta =

Song by Ali Gul Pir
- Language: Urdu
- Released: June 2012
- Length: 3:00

Music video
- "Waderai Ka Beta" on Vimeo

Waderai Ka Beta is a satirical comedy song released in June 2012 by Ali Gul Pir. The song hits out at the typical feudal culture in Pakistan.

== Satirical Message ==
The video and the lyrics revolve around a man who boasts about his family's power, status and money. The song satirically points at the lavish lifestyle of a feudal in Pakistan. Commenting about the song, the singer said, "The track is a dig at influential people who misuse their authority. The subject could be anyone from [among] the sons of bureaucrats to tribal leaders."

== Reception ==
The song became an instant hit soon after it was first uploaded on YouTube on June 14, 2012.

== See also ==
- Aalu Anday
- Sab Paisay Ki Game Hai
- Beghairat Brigade
