= Talha Anjum =

Pakistani rapper (born 1995)

- Born: 3 October 1996 (age 30); Karachi, Sindh, Pakistan
- Genre: Hip-hop
- Occupation: Rapper
- Years active: 2013–present
- Member of: Young Stunners

Talha Anjum (Urdu: طلحہ انجُم; born 3 October 1996) is a Pakistani rapper and songwriter, known for being a member and co-founder of the hip-hop duo Young Stunners along with Talhah Yunus. As a solo artist, he has released three studio albums and starred in the 2024 film Kattar Karachi.

== Early and personal life ==
Talha Anjum was born on 3 October 1996 in Karachi, Sindh, Pakistan. His younger brother, Umer Anjum, is also a rapper.

In February 2026, he got engaged to content creator Zoiea Karim.

== Career ==
Talha Anjum and Talhah Yunus realized their potential during school and formed the Young Stunners. Based in Karachi, they introduced Urdu rap to the Pakistani music industry. In 2013, their song "Burger-e-Karachi" brought them initial fame, followed by other tracks like "Maila Majnun" and "Laam Sai Chaura". Though they briefly separated and struggled during their solo careers, they reunited in 2017 for their debut album Rebirth. Later in 2021, their major releases included "Gumaan", "Afsanay", and the #HBLPSL6 anthem, "Groove Mera". The duo also featured together in a live show at Pakistan Day Parade.

Anjum then also began to appear separately and collaborated with other artists. In 2022, he collaborated with Karakoram and Faris Shafi to perform "Ye Dunya", a nu metal track from #CokeStudio14, which discusses the struggles and emotional support for each other. He released "Nevermind" with Indian rapper Calm. In 2023, he released his debut solo album, Open Letter, which earned him two nominations at the 23rd Lux Style Awards. He also appeared on the song "Mere Bina" alongside singer The PropheC, from American DJ Kshmr's album Karam.

In 2024, he released "Kaun Talha", a diss track in response to a comment made by Indian rapper Naezy, in an interview. He then released his second solo album, My Terrible Mind, in collaboration with the American label Mass Appeal. In December, Anjum made his cinematic debut in the short film Kattar Karachi, a visual representation of the album, and also served as an executive producer. Though the film underperformed, it won the Lux Style Award for Film of the Year. Next year, he collaborated with Ali Zafar and others for the #HBLPSLX anthem, "X Dekho".

In 2026, he became a judge with Bohemia on a reality TV show Rap Icon Pakistan. He then released his third solo album Troublesome '96 in October 2026.

== Style and influence ==
Anjum is inspired by Jaun Elia and his poetic style, and he uses street language, local humour, and social commentary in his lyrics to connect with the newer generation. (Note: Pieces of claims and critical commentary over the years are extracted from The National News, Dawn, Inqalab.in, and The Express Tribune.) He backs his unfiltered rap style and themes, though he clarifies that he does not intend to promote drugs and violence. Indian rapper Badshah has also praised his writing style.

According to the 2024 Spotify Wrapped, he became the most-streamed local artist in Pakistan. He had 17 tracks featured out of the top 30 Pakistani tracks on the Spotify Global Impact list. He was second to Atif Aslam in the previous two years. In the following years, he was named Pakistani Gen-Z's most favourite artist, with hip-hop as their most favourite genre, and he was ranked the most-streamed local artist since the Spotify Pakistan started in 2021.

== Controversy ==
In 2025, Anjum faced a disturbance during some of his concerts in different cities of Pakistan, when objects were thrown at him, and the organizers had to forcibly remove the alleged perpetrator from the venue. In November, Anjum faced backlash from Pakistani media for waving the Indian flag at a concert in Nepal, though he defended his action by distinguishing art from politics. However, he issued an unconditional apology few days later, in a live TV show hosted by Nadia Khan.

== Selected discography ==
=== Singles and collaborations ===
Year	Track	Collaboration with	Producer(s)	Note(s)
2015	"Naraz Na Hona"			To honour the martyrs of 2014 Peshawar school massacre
2021	"Surface"	Abdullah Siddiqui		
2022	"Ye Dunya"	Karakoram & Faris Shafi	Xulfi & Sherry Khattak	#CokeStudio14
2022	"Topdown"	Shareh & superdupersultan	superdupersultan	
2022	"Nevermind"	Umair & Calm	Umair	
2022	"Death Wish"	Umair	Umair	From the single "Worth The Wait" by Talha Anjum & Umair
2022	"4AM in Karachi"	Umair	Umair	From the single "Worth The Wait" by Talha Anjum & Umair
2023	"Been a While"	KR$NA & Umair	Umair	From the EP Time Will Tell by KR$NA
2023	"Wish 2 Die Freestyle"	Savage, Umair, Shareh	Umair	
2023	"Mere Bina"	Kshmr, The PropheC	Kshmr	From the album Karam by Kshmr
2024	"Kaun Talha"	Umair	Umair	Diss track directed towards Naezy
2024	"Fifty Enemies"	Umair, Shamoon Ismail	Umair	Released as a part of the single "Ghosts and Goodbyes"
2024	"Love Lost"	Umair	Umair	Released as a part of the single "Ghosts and Goodbyes"
2024	"Smile"	Umair	Umair	Released as a part of the single "Ghosts and Goodbyes"
2024	"Munde Busy"	Umair, Shamoon Ismail	Umair	Released as a part of the single "For Tha Dogs"
2024	"Shots Fired"	Umair	Umair	Released as a part of the single "For Tha Dogs"
2024	"Kattar Karachi"	Umair	Umair	Released as a part of the single "For Tha Dogs"
2024	"Channa Ve"	Rahul Sathu		
2024	"Citylights"	JJ47, Umair, Maria Unera	Umair	
2024	"Since Tum"	JANI	superdupersultan	
2024	"Runnin'"	JJ47, Jokhay	Jokhay	Released as a part of the single "10 Minute Drill"
2024	"Moonlight"	JJ47, Jokhay	Jokhay	Released as a part of the single "10 Minute Drill"
2024	"Rainy Nights"	JJ47, Jokhay	Jokhay	Released as a part of the single "10 Minute Drill"
2024	"Kardi Koi"	Abdullah Muzaffar	Atif Khan	Released as part of the EP Rags to Riches by Abdullah Muzaffar
2024	"BTDT" (Been There Done That)	Bilal Saeed		Released as part of the album Superstar by Bilal Saeed
2025	"X Dekho"	Ali Zafar, Abrar Ul Haq, and Natasha Baig	Lightingale	#HBLPSLX anthem
2025	"Chal Dil Mere"	Ali Zafar	Lightingale	Recreated the song with additional lyrics for Zafar's album Roshni
2025	"Hawa Anay De"		Umair	Released as a single

=== Albums ===
Year	Album	Track	Collaboration with	Producer(s)
2023	Open Letter	"Melancholy"		Umair
2023	Open Letter	"Happy Hour"		Jokhay
2023	Open Letter	"At the Top"		Umair
2023	Open Letter	"Touch Base"	Krsna & Talhah Yunus	Umair
2023	Open Letter	"Studio Gangsters"	Rap Demon	Umair & SuperduperSultan
2023	Open Letter	"Two Tone"		Umair
2023	Open Letter	"False Prophets"		Umair
2023	Open Letter	"Desperations"		Umair
2023	Open Letter	"Lost in Time"		Umair
2023	Open Letter	"Kaam Pura"		Umair
2023	Open Letter	"Flex"		Umair
2023	Open Letter	"Glass Half Full"	JJ47 & Talhah Yunus	Umair
2023	Open Letter	"Downers at Dusk"		Umair
2023	Open Letter	"Secrets"		Umair
2023	Open Letter	"Open Letter"		Umair
2024	My Terrible Mind	"Back for more"		Umair
2024	My Terrible Mind	"Good Fellaa"		Umair
2024	My Terrible Mind	"Run it Back"		Umair
2024	My Terrible Mind	"Young OG"		Umair
2024	My Terrible Mind	"Plug Shaart"		Umair
2024	My Terrible Mind	"30 Shooter"		Umair
2024	My Terrible Mind	"5am in Lahore"		Umair
2024	My Terrible Mind	"Crazy Maybe"		Umair
2024	My Terrible Mind	"Incurable Sadness"		Umair
2024	My Terrible Mind	"Heartbreak Kid"		Umair
2024	My Terrible Mind	"Loneliness"		Umair
2024	My Terrible Mind	"Jasmine"		Umair
2024	My Terrible Mind	"Sweet Talk"		Umair
2024	My Terrible Mind	"Let Go"		Umair
2024	My Terrible Mind	"Departure Lane"		Umair
2024	My Terrible Mind	"Rainy Days"		Umair
2026	Troublesome '96	"Thousand Faces"		Umair
2026	Troublesome '96	"Jordon"		Umair
2026	Troublesome '96	"Mavaali"		Umair
2026	Troublesome '96	"We Don't Know You"		Jokhay
2026	Troublesome '96	"Chaukas"		Umair
2026	Troublesome '96	"Khopchay"		Jokhay
2026	Troublesome '96	"Karachi Rambo"		Umair
2026	Troublesome '96	"Told My Brother"		Umair
2026	Troublesome '96	"Always on Time"		Umair

== Filmography ==
- Kattar Karachi (2024)

== Awards and nominations ==
Year	Nominee / work	Award	Result	Ref
Lux Style Awards
2024–25	Open Letter	Most Stylish Musician	Nominated	
2024–25	"Downers At Dusk"	Singer of the Year	Nominated	
2025	Kattar Karachi	Film Actor of the Year - Male (Viewers' choice)	Nominated	
2025	Kattar Karachi	Film of the Year (Viewers' choice)	Won	
2025	"Departure Lane"	Artist of the Year (Viewers' choice)	Nominated	
Pakistan International Screen Awards
2021	"Tum Tum"	Song of the Year	Nominated	
2025	"Departure Lane"	Song of the Year	Pending	
2025	Artist of the Year		Pending	
