= Kattar Karachi =

2024 Pakistani film by Abdul Wali Baloch

- Theatrical release poster
- Urdu: کٹر کراچی
- Directed by: Abdul Wali Baloch
- Written by: Bilal Atif
- Produced by: Dilawar Baloch
- Starring: Talha Anjum; Kinza Hashmi; Imran Ashraf
- Cinematography: Noor Turk
- Edited by: Bilal Sagar
- Music by: Umair (Young Stunners)
- Production companies: Kattar Karachi Productions (Note: Credits extracted from Hum TV's channel on YouTube); Mass Appeal
- Distributed by: Hum Films
- Release date: 20 December 2024
- Running time: 40 minutes
- Country: Pakistan
- Language: Urdu

Kattar Karachi (lit. 'Hardcore Karachi') is a 2024 Pakistani crime thriller short-film, directed by Abdul Wali Baloch and written by Bilal Atif. Set in the underworld in Karachi, the film stars Talha Anjum, Kinza Hashmi, and Imran Ashraf.

It was released on 20 December 2024 by Hum Films, and produced by Talha Anjum and Dilawar Baloch. Despite underperforming, it won the Lux Style Award for Film of the Year.

== Premise ==
Talha is a young aggressive man who works at a local restaurant in Karachi, Pakistan. Although he has a friend, he often spends time with his elderly neighbours as well, who live in their stereotypical mindset with their children. Talha dreams big of achieving a car, but gets troubled when he once argues with his friend about an expensive car he sees nearby a tea stall. And then Tanya comes into his life, and Talha spends all his savings to buy a ring so he can profess his love to her and propose. However, he confronts a criminal gang of land-grabbers led by Sikandar. As Talha uncovers the dark reality of the crime underworld, he now has to fight off the goons. So, he and his locality friends decide to confront the criminals before they could take over the city.

== Cast ==
- Talha Anjum as Talha, a worker at the restaurant
- Kinza Hashmi as Tanya, Talha's love interest
- Imran Ashraf as Sikandar, a mafia boss who is a land-grabber with a pronounced limp
- Syed Jameel as Sikandar's guy
- Hussain Mohsin as Talha's friend

== Production ==
My Terrible Mind

Studio album by Talha Anjum
- Released: 29 November 2024
- Label: Kattar Karachi; Mass Appeal

Singles from Kattar Karachi
- 1. "Good Fellas"; 2. "30 Shooter"; 3. "Heartbreak Kid"; 4. "Departure Lane"

Talha Anjum, a rapper, released his album My Terrible Mind in 2024, under collaboration with the label Mass Appeal. According to the Spotify Wrapped, he was the most streamed artist in Spotify Pakistan that year.

While he was discussing the visual representation for the album with the director Abdul Wali Baloch, they planned to make a short film instead of the traditional music video. The album discussed the hardships faced by those while growing up in Karachi.

The film features the cinematic debut of both Anjum and Kinza Hashmi, who play the lead pair. It is also the directorial debut film for Baloch, who had previously directed music videos. Anjum also served as an executive producer, while Dilawar Baloch served as the film producer, Noor Turk served as the cinematographer, and Bilal Sagar served as the film editor.

The music was provided by Umair from Young Stunners. The film soundtrack features four out of sixteen songs from the album My Terrible Mind.

== Release ==
The film was released on 20 December 2024 by Hum Films, few days after the film teaser. It had a premiere event in Karachi, a day before its release, though the film was commercially unsuccessful. Mohammad Kamran Jawaid of Dawn felt that the film was plagued by amateurism, while Muhammad Suhayb of Youlin Magazine felt that the screenplay is "written in haste" and that the director "forgot to look into the story", but praised the role of Talha Anjum.

=== Accolades ===
Award	Won	Nominated
24th Lux Style Awards	Film of the Year (Viewers' choice)	Imran Ashraf: Film Actor of the Year - Male (Viewers' choice); Talha Anjum: Film Actor of the Year - Male (Viewers' choice); Kinza Hashmi: Film Actor of the Year - Female (Viewers' choice); Abdul Wali Baloch: Film Director of the Year (Critics' choice); Talha Anjum – "Departure Lane": Artist of the Year (Viewers' choice)
