= Natasha Baig =

Pakistani singer-songwriter

Natasha Baig نتاشا بیگ
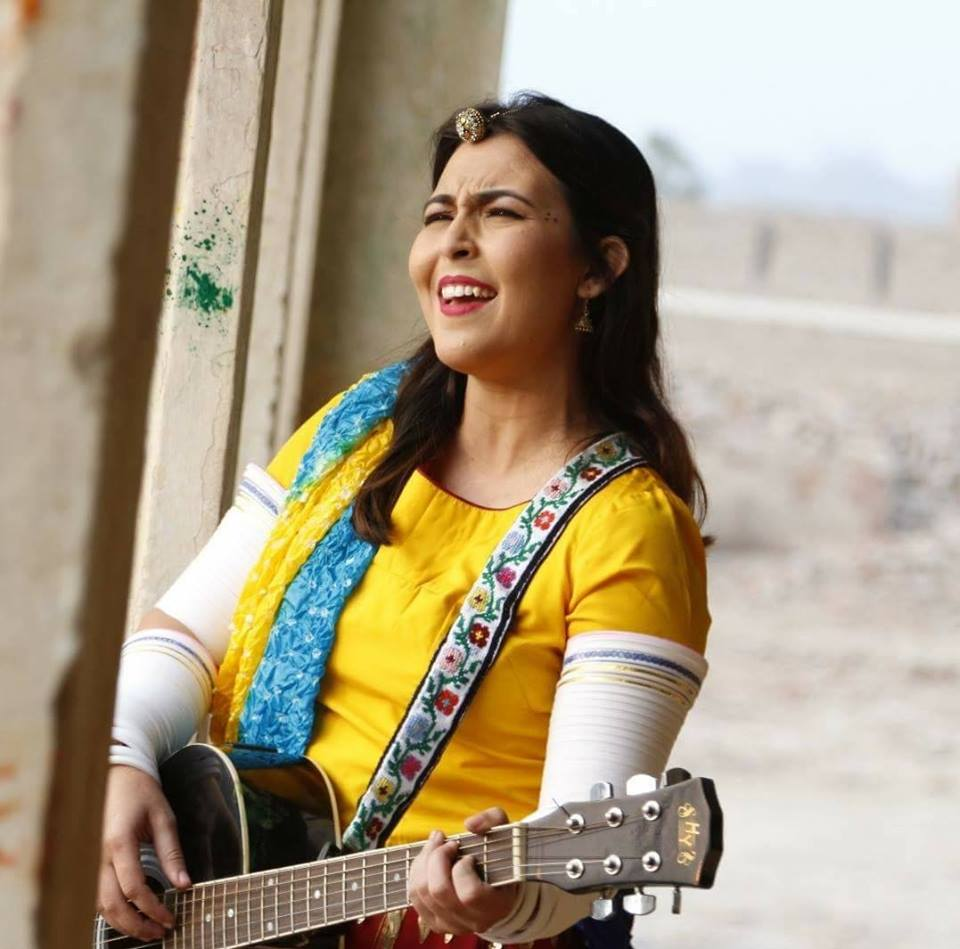
- Natasha Baig during the music video shoot of "Kesaria"

Background information
- Born: Karachi, Sindh, Pakistan
- Genres: Sufi Rock; Rock; Folk; Classical; Sufi
- Occupation: Singer-songwriter
- Instrument: Vocals
- Years active: 2013–present
- Labels: Laal Series Umair Jaswal, Ali Azmat, Shahi Hassan, Sounds of Kolachi

Natasha Baig (Urdu: نتاشا بیگ), also spelled Nata-sha Baig, is a Pakistani singer-songwriter from Hunza Valley. She sings in various genres including Sufi rock and had her latest hit with the Burushaski language song "Ya Maula" in collaboration with the designer Yousuf B. Qureshi.

== Early life ==
Baig was born and raised in Karachi, but her family home is in Hunza.

== Career ==
Baig has no formal music education. She grew up listening to Abida Parveen, Michael Jackson, and others. She is known for her live performances in Pakistan.

She started her career in 2013 with a reality show ‘Cornetto Music Icons’ where she was selected as one of the six finalists and was mentored by Zoe Viccaji. Her performance of the song ‘Dekha na tha’ by Alamgir was commended. After the show Baig joined ‘Sounds of Kolachi’ a Sufi ensemble originally started by Ahsan Bari where she was one of the main lead singers in the ensemble.

Baig was also one of the panelists in ‘The Karachi Music Festival’ alongside Humera Channa, Zoe Viccaji and Saif Samejo where they discussed the Pakistani music industry. She also performed in the event with her new band ‘Kaya’. Soon Baig left Kaya and started performing as a solo artist with her own band members including her brother Sameer Baig on guitars. She performed at "Lahooti Music Mela" introduced by Saif Samejo of Sketches band and many other musical events across the country.

In 2016, Baig co-founded a production Company ‘Laal Series’ that produced Baig’s music videos besides other work in the industry including commercials, short films and public service messages. The breakthrough for Baig came when she was nominated for Best Emerging Talent at the 2017 Lux Style Awards for her song "Jhoom Le" in the film Janaan. She then released her song with Mai Dhai "Kesaria". which was produced by her company Laal Series.

Baig then released her song "Maa" on Mother’s Day. Her latest song is "Deewana Banaya". She has appeared in Coke Studio Season 11, singing Shikwa/ Jawab-e-Shikawa, a poem by Allama Iqbal. The song was well received throughout the region and remained trending at top in Pakistan.

Natasha Baig appeared in Kashan Admani's Acoustic Station and performed a rendition of "Dur Ze Darya" - written by the Persian poet Nasir Khusraw.

== We Are One (Global Collaboration Song) ==
Natasha Baig featured in We Are One (Global Collaboration Song) produced by Kashan Admani. The song features 40 musicians from all over the world coming together for a message of hope and togetherness.

== Discography ==
=== Television OST's ===
- Jhooti Produced by Shuja Haider
- Naina aur Tum
- Muhabbat Khak Safar
- Kahani Raima Aur Manahil Ki produced by Sohail Haider
- Sangsaar
- Khaas produced by Sohail Haider

=== Film Songs ===
- "Jhoom le" Janaan (2016) Produced by Taha Malik
- "Ishq Lara" Saat Din Mohabbat In (2017) Produced by Shani Arshad

=== Singles ===
- Mane Na Kehna (Cornetto Music Icon) - 2013
- Kesaria - 2017
- Humse Hai Pakistan - 2017
- Maa - 2017
- Ya Moula - 2017
- Deewana Banaya - 2017
- Shikwa Jawab e Shikwa (CokeStudio Season 11) ft. Fareed Ayaz Qawal Group
- Ek Qoum Ek Awaz (Audionic Azadi Anthem) - 2018
- Bulleya Bulleya ft RaagRush 2018
- Ho Mian - 2018
- Ya Moula (Urdu) - 2019
- Maine Dekha Hai - 23 March 2019
- Dur Ze Darya - Acoustic Station
- Mushkil Kusha (Ayaz Ismail)
- Kaise Kahoon (Ayaz Ismail, Hussain Ajani)
- "X Dekho" (#HBLPSLX anthem with Ali Zafar, Abrar Ul Haq, and Talha Anjum) - 2025

== Awards and nominations ==
Year	Nominee / work	Award	Result
Lux Style Awards
2017	"Jhoom Le" – Janaan	Emerging Talent of the Year	Nominated
2020	"Wo Jo Tha Bohat Hi Khaas" - Khaas	Best Original Soundtrack (TV)	Nominated
