= Aalu Anday =

Song by Beygairat Brigade

Aalu Anday ("Potato and eggs") is a satirical rock song by Pakistani group Beygairat Brigade, based in Lahore.

== Satirical message ==
The song Aalu Anday challenges censorship and the celebration of violence in Pakistan (particularly from its leaders) with references including:

- Ajmal Qasab, one of the 2008 Mumbai attackers;
- Abdus Salam, a Pakistani Nobel laureate;
- the 'qadri,' the guard who recently killed Salmaan Taseer, the governor of Punjab, for being outspoken against Pakistan's blasphemy laws.

The video, released in October 2011, includes handwritten signs that offer further controversial references, as well as predicting the kind of physical or political retribution the band may expect to suffer as a result of the video's dissemination.

== Reception ==
The Economist described the song as "witty, lively, and enjoyable", explaining that the group's name, Beyghairat Brigade, meant "The Dishonour Brigade, and that Aalu Anday is the group's first song. The Economist wrote that "Pakistanis thrilled over a music video, available online, in which young singers poke fun at politicians, army chiefs" and more.

'The New York Times' says the song "takes a tongue-in-cheek swipe at religious extremism, militancy and contradictions in Pakistani society", "as a rare voice of the country’s embattled liberals." It "delivers biting commentary on the current socio-political milieu of the country", and "rues the fact that killers and religious extremists are hailed as heroes in Pakistan".

Indian Express calls the song "a peppy Punjabi number" with satirical lyrics.

== Video ==
It was shot in a classroom with three members of the group, and was directed by Farhan Adeel.

== See also ==
- Sab Paisay Ki Game Hai
- Ali Gul Pir
