= Sab Paisay Ki Game Hai =

Pakistani song

Song by Beygairat Brigade
- Language: Urdu; Punjabi
- Released: February 2013
- Length: 3:19
- Songwriter: Beygairat Brigade
- Producer: Mishermayl Productions

Music video
- "Sab Paisay Ki Game Hai" on Vimeo

Sab Paisay Ki Game Hai is a satirical song by Beygairat Brigade released in 2013.

== Satirical Message ==
Shot at a chai (tea) stall in Lahore, the song points at the undeniable power of money and the effects it has on personal ethics and different national and international issues. The lust for money according to the song is not limited to a particular area rather it is a global phenomenon.

The song than points out that every occurrence such as foreign tours, international aid, military aid, encroachments over public lands, corruption and even measures taken by the rulers in name of sovereignty and safety, all revolve around the undeniable strength of money.

Lead vocalist Ali Aftab Saeed said, "We tried to explore the behaviour of our rulers. It's meant to be a pun on these dynamics, we tried to make it playful also so that it doesn't come off as a lecture". The song received positive reception.

== Video ==
The music video was shot in Lahore, Pakistan by Farhan Adeel

== See also ==
- Aalu Anday
- Ali Gul Pir
