= Shamoon Ismail =

Pakistani singer and songwriter (born 1991)

- شمعون اسمعیل
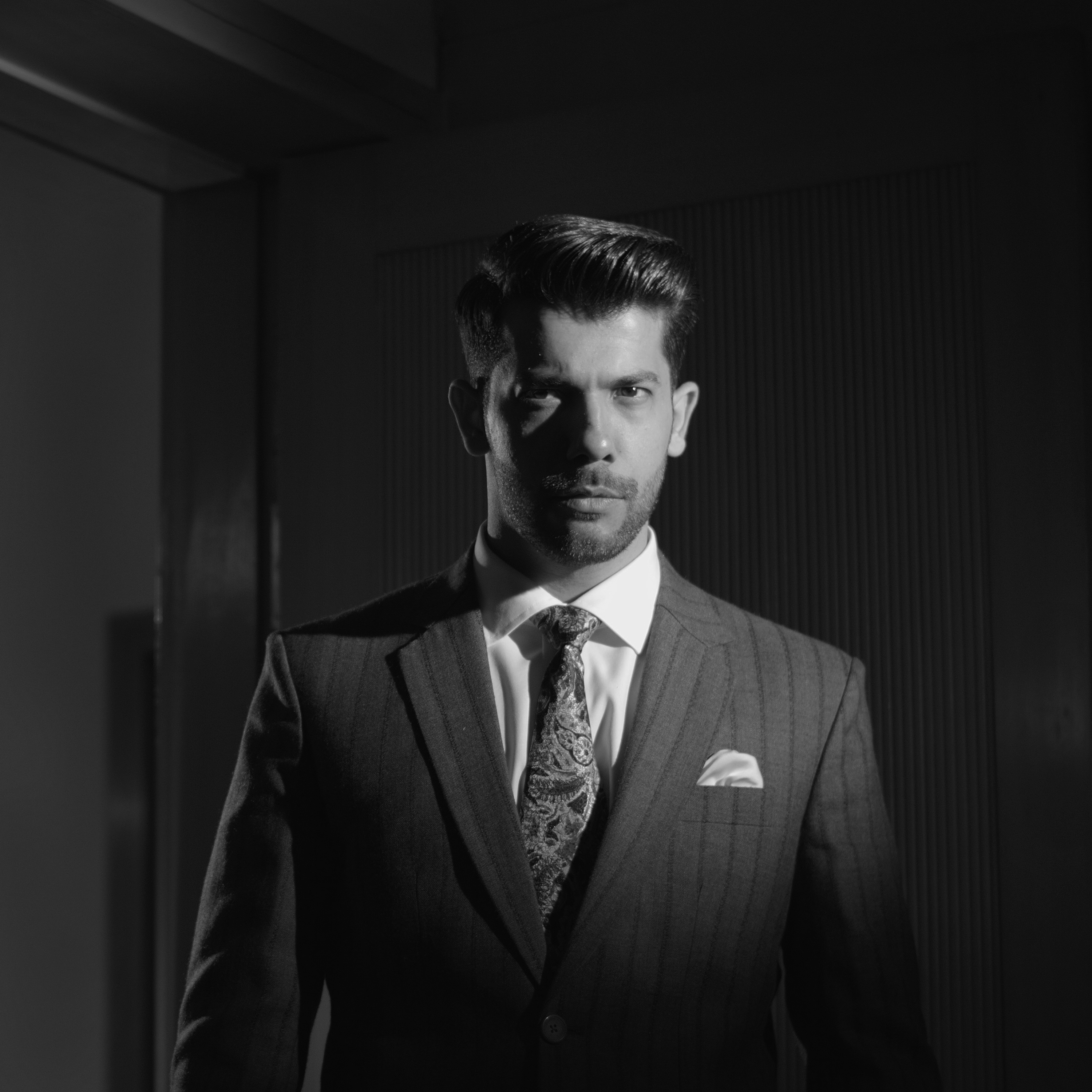
- Born: Shamoon Ismail; 21 September 1991 (age 34); Islamabad, Pakistan
- Known for: Music, Punjabi Blues
- Notable work: Tum Tum, Marijuana, Taare, On & On
- Style: RnB, Punjabi Blues, Chill Rap, Synthwave 80's electric music
- Awards: Lux Style Awards- Nominated 2019 (Singer of the Year)
- Website: shamoonismail.com

Shamoon Ismail (Punjabi: شمعون اسمعیل; born 21 September 1991) is a Pakistani singer, songwriter, composer and multi-instrumentalist known for his signature blend of "Punjabi and blues".

== Early life ==
Ismail was born and raised in Islamabad, to a Punjabi Muslim family. He has spent most of his life in Pakistan learning musical instruments, having a keen interest in playing guitars since childhood.

Out of the four instruments he can play, he prefers the guitar and bass the most while also enjoying drums.

== Career ==
At the beginning of his career, Ismail first started releasing music on Bandcamp and SoundCloud with the help of his friends, from where he attracted a following. He often performs live on local university campuses and also in popular regional music festivals like Music Mela and Lahore Music Meet. His first single "Sapne" was released in 2013. He released his first music video "Tuntuna" on YouTube which was popular among Pakistani and Indian audiences. His collaborations with other artists include MRKLE, Talal Qureshi, Abdullah Qureshi, Haider Mustehsan, Osama Com Laude (OCL), Mooroo, Ghauri, Young Stunners, Asim Azhar, Raamis, Annural Khalid, Talha Anjum and Talhah Yunus.

In late 2018, Pakistani singer Bilal Khan was accused of plagiarizing Shamoon Ismail's "Taare".

== Awards and nominations ==
Year	Nominee / work	Award	Result	Ref
Lux Style Awards
2019	Marijuana	Singer of the Year	Nominated	
Lux Style Awards
2020	Late Night	Song of the Year	Nominated	
Shaan-e-Pakistan Music Achievements Awards (SEPMA)
2020	Rok Le	Best Indie Music	Won	
Hum Style Awards
2021	Most Stylish Performer		Won	
Pakistan International Screen Awards (PISA)
2021	On & On	Song of the Year	Nominated	

== Discography ==
Year	Album/EP	Record Label	Featured Artist(s)	Writer(s)	Composer(s)
2018	Cookie	-	Haider Mustehsan & Mooroo	Shamoon Ismail, Haider Mustehsan & Mooroo	Shamoon Ismail, ZOH, Moji

No.	Album/EP	Song	Featured Artist(s)	Writer(s)	Composer(s)
1	Cookie	Marijuana	–	Shamoon Ismail	Shamoon Ismail
2	Cookie	Khayal	–	Shamoon Ismail	Shamoon Ismail
3	Cookie	Karachi	–	Shamoon Ismail	ZOH
4	Cookie	Na Toon	–	Shamoon Ismail, Haider Mustehsan & Mooroo	Shamoon Ismail & Moji
5	Scars & Screws	Chaunde Ne Pharna			Shamoon Ismail, Rovalio & Ghauri
6	Scars & Screws	Faasla	Hasan Raheem		Rovalio
7	Scars & Screws	All Night Long			Shamoon Ismail
8	Scars & Screws	Cocaine			Rovalio
9	Scars & Screws	Load Out	Talhah Yunas		Rovalio
10	Scars & Screws	Scars & Screws			Rovalio
11	Scars & Screws	051021	Talha Anjum		Rovalio & Shamoon Ismail
12	Scars & Screws	Promises	Annural Khalid		Shamoon Ismail
13	Scars & Screws	Location			Rovalio
14	Scars & Screws	Lockdown Freestyle			Rovalio & Shamoon Ismail
15	Scars & Screws	Promises (Rovalio Mix)	Annural Khalid		Rovalio
16	Scars & Screws	Into The Sunset			Rovalio
