= Arish Ali Khan =

Pakistani cricketer (born 2000)

Personal information
- Born: 20 December 2000 (age 25); Karachi, Sindh, Pakistan
- Batting: Right-handed
- Bowling: Slow left-arm orthodox
- Role: All rounder

Domestic team information
- Years: Team
- 2021: Quetta Gladiators
- 2022: Peshawar Zalmi (squad no. 2)
- Source: Cricinfo, 2 February 2022

Arish Ali Khan (born 20 December 2000) is a Pakistani cricketer. He was named in Pakistan's squad for the 2020 Under-19 Cricket World Cup. Prior to the 2020 Pakistan Super League, he was named as one of six local rookies to watch. He made his Twenty20 debut on 19 June 2021, for Quetta Gladiators in the 2021 Pakistan Super League, taking four wickets in the match. He made his first-class cricket debut in 2023.

== Early life and career ==
Arish Ali Khan was born on 20 December 2000 in Karachi, Pakistan. At age 10, he joined the National Bank Cricket Academy to pursue cricket. While pursuing cricket, Arish also studied for a degree in computer science.

In 2014, Arish gave trials for the Karachi Region Under-16 team and, although initially unsuccessful, he later joined and captained the Pakistan Under-16 team in 2015. Under his captaincy, the team won series against Australia in One-Day and T20 formats. He continued as captain during the 2016 tour of the UAE.

Arish began playing Grade 2 cricket at age 15, starting with Pakistan Railways in the Patron's Trophy (Grade II) 2015/16, where he took 15 wickets in four matches. He also played for Port Qasim Authority in subsequent seasons, taking a total of 17 wickets.

In Under-19 cricket, Arish took 16 wickets in 10 matches during the Inter Region Under-19 One Day Tournament 2017/18 and 30 wickets in 6 games for Sindh Under-19s in the National Under-19 Three Day Tournament 2019/20.
