= Ali Aftab Saeed =

Pakistani musical artist, journalist and analyst

- علی آفتاب سعید
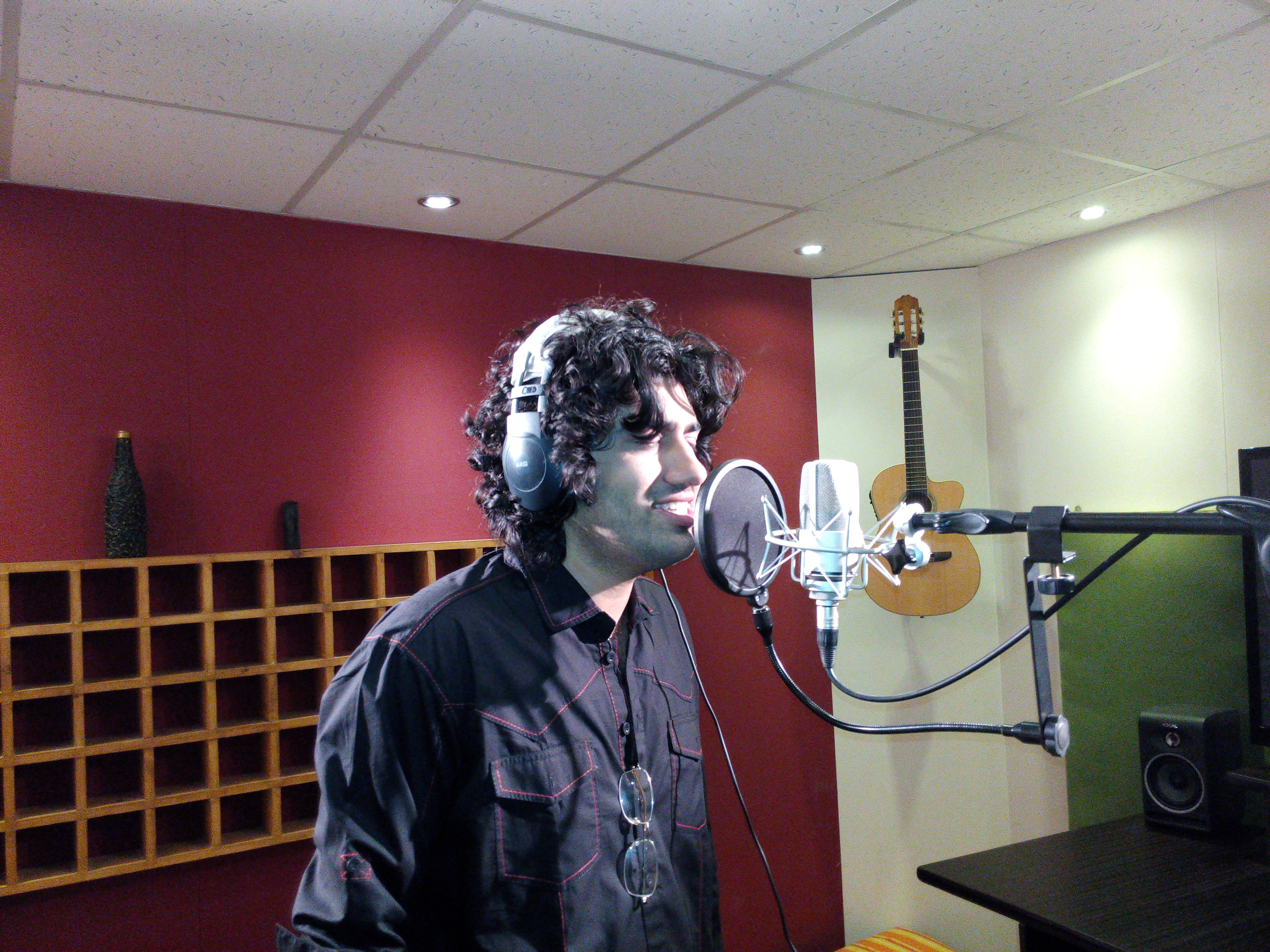
- Born: 1983 or 1984 (age 41–42); Lahore
- Occupation: Singer

Ali Aftab Saeed (born 1983 or 1984) is a Pakistani musical artist. He was the lead vocalist for the band Beygairat Brigade.

== Career ==
Aftab founded the band Beygairat Brigade in 2011. He was the lead vocalist of the band. The band has produced three satirical tracks. His first single, "Aalu Anday", was released in November 2011 and was warmly received in Pakistan and abroad wherever people understand Urdu and Punjabi languages. His second single "Pasay Ki Game" was released in March 2013. His third single, "Dhinak Dhinak", was released in 2013. His most recent album "Janjan Te Janazay" ("Weddings and Funereals") was released on March 2, 2019. He has co-hosted the show "With a Pinch of Salt" alongside Ayesha Noor, and later went on to co-host "Aap Janab" on AapNews. He began a series on YouTube known as "Ali Uncensored."
