= Beygairat Brigade =

Pakistani rock band

- Also known as: Brigade you can't live without (English)
- Origin: Lahore, Punjab, Pakistan
- Genres: Rock
- Years active: Since 2011
- Members: Ali Aftab Saeed; Daniyal Malik; Hamza Malik

Beygairat Brigade (Urdu: بےغیرت بریگیڈ transl. Brigade you can't live without) is a Lahore-based Pakistani rock band founded in 2011 by Ali Aftab Saeed who is also the lead vocalist of the band. The band has produced three satirical tracks so far and has mocked Pakistan Army and army rule in Pakistan. Director is Farhan Adeel.

== History ==
The band's lead vocalist is Ali Aftab Saeed; Hashir Ibrahim, Daniyal Malik and Hamza Malik are also members of the band. The videos are directed by Farhan Adeel.

The band became popular when they released their first song "Aalu Anday", " an unsparing song that lampoons Pakistan's top politicians and generals from Ashfaq Kayani to Zia-ul-Haq, from Nawaz Sharif to Imran Khan"; After it became a hit song on YouTube and local video websites, mainstream Pakistani media started playing it as well in spite of its political content.

Beygairat Brigade released their second single Sab Paisay Ki Game Hai in February 2013. It criticised people's obsession with money and how it influences Pakistan's politics and safety issues. The song was extensively played in local media and became an instant hit.

The band's latest single "Dhinak Dhinak", released in May 2013, criticizing the military's indirect domination of Pakistan politics, was promptly blocked on the video sharing site Vimeo, no reasons were cited. The lead singer, Ali Aftab Saeed, suspects that the Pakistan Telecommunication Authority blocked the video after a nod from the military.

== Discography ==
- "Aalu Anday" (single) – 2011
- "Sab Paisay Ki Game Hai" (single) – 2013
- "Dhinak Dhinak" (single) – 2013

== Members ==
- Ali Aftab Saeed – lead vocalist
- Hamza Malik – guitarist
- Daniyal Malik – percussionist

== See also ==
- List of Pakistani music bands
- List of rock musicians
- Music of Pakistan
- Sab Paisay Ki Game Hai
