= Naseebo Lal =

Pakistani folk singer

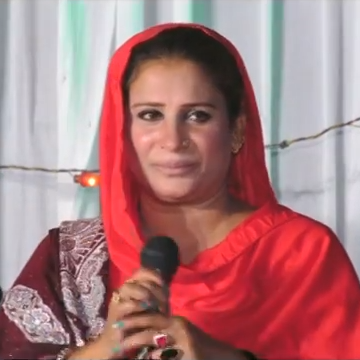
- Naseebo Lal in 2017

Background information
- Born: 10 January 1970 (age 56); Chishtian, Punjab, Pakistan
- Origin: Chishtian
- Genre: folk
- Occupations: Playback Singer
- Years active: 1980–present

Naseebo Lal (born 10 January 1970) is a Pakistani folk singer who sings primarily in Punjabi, Urdu and Marwari languages. She performed in traditional Pakistani stage shows.

== Career ==
She debuted as a featured artist in Coke Studio's ninth season. She sang Groove Mera alongside Aima Baig and Young Stunners. She also sang Tu Jhoom with Abida Parveen in Coke Studio's Season 14. The song Tu Jhoom featured at the end of episode 5 of the Marvel series Ms. Marvel.
