= Young Stunners =

Pakistani hip-hop duet

- Origin: Karachi, Pakistan
- Genre: hip hop
- Years active: 2012–present
- Label: Mass Appeal
- Members: Talha Anjum; Talhah Yunus
- Website: stunnervision.com

Young Stunners is a Karachi-based hip-hop duo formed in 2012 by Talha Anjum, Talhah Yunus and with the music production primarily handled by Jokhay and Umair.

== History ==
The group consists of Talha Anjum and Talhah Yunus. Both were born and raised in Karachi. The duo got their education at the Army Public School, Saddar and have been friends since the age of 16. The group was formed on 2 July 2012 and started releasing music in the same year. Their debut singles "Burger-e-Karachi", a satirical take at the westernised and out-of-touch urban elites of Karachi, and "Maila Majnu" were some of songs that became widely popular. In 2017, they released their debut album Rebirth.

In July 2020, they collaborated with Asim Azhar, Shamoon Ismail, and Raamis on the track "Tum Tum". In September 2021, they released the track "Why Not" as part of a promotional campaign for Pepsi. In March 2022, they collaborated with Faisal Kapadia on the final track of the fourteenth season of Coke Studio titled "Phir Milenge".

Some of their major hits to date include: the collaborative 2021 PSL anthem Groove Mera with Naseebo Lal and Aima Baig, their performance at the 2021 Pakistan Day Parade and their music video "Afsanay".

They are often credited for introducing Urdu rap into the mainstream Pakistani music scene.

In 2024, Young Stunners signed with Mass Appeal Records.

== Discography ==
=== Albums ===
Year	Album	Track	Artist(s)	Ref.
2017	Rebirth	Real Talk	Young Stunners	
2017	Rebirth	I Don't Know	Young Stunners	
2017	Rebirth	No Hook Ups	Young Stunners	
2017	Rebirth	Karachi Lingo	Young Stunners	
2017	Rebirth	Right Now	Young Stunners	
2017	Rebirth	Rooh - Remix	Young Stunners	
2017	Rebirth	Po Po	Young Stunners	
2017	Rebirth	Dear Zainab	Young Stunners	
2017	Rebirth	32 Bore	Young Stunners	
2017	Rebirth	Class	Young Stunners	
2017	Rebirth	Jhoolay Laal	Young Stunners	
2017	Rebirth	Next Level	Young Stunners	
2017	Rebirth	Uber	Young Stunners	
2017	Rebirth	Naya Pakistan	Young Stunners	
2017	Rebirth	Asli Hai	Young Stunners	

=== EPs ===
Year	EP	Track	Artist(s)	Ref.
2020	A Tale of Two Talhas	Jalega	Young Stunners	
2020	A Tale of Two Talhas	Cali 2 Karachi	Young Stunners	
2020	A Tale of Two Talhas	Karachi Chal	Young Stunners	
2020	A Tale of Two Talhas	Gumaan	Young Stunners	
2020	A Tale of Two Talhas	Don't Mind	Young Stunners	
2020	A Tale of Two Talhas	Laga Reh	Young Stunners	
2020	A Tale of Two Talhas	Afsanay	Young Stunners	
2020	A Tale of Two Talhas	Why	Young Stunners	

=== Singles and collaborations ===
Year	Track	Artist(s)	Producer(s)	Note(s)	Ref.
2020	Tum Tum	Asim Azhar, Shamoon Ismail, Young Stunners & Raamis	Qasim Azhar		
2020	Gumaan	Young Stunners	Jokhay		
2021	Groove Mera	Naseebo Lal, Aima Baig & Young Stunners	Bilal Haider	2021 PSL anthem	
2021	Yaad	Asim Azhar ft. Young Stunners	Nafeel Ali		
2021	Afsanay	Young Stunners	Jokhay		
2022	Why	Young Stunners	Jokhay		
2022	Phir Milenge	Faisal Kapadia & Young Stunners	Xulfi & Abdullah Siddiqui	From Coke Studio	
2026	Shikaar	Talhah Yunus, Jokhay	Jokhay	From the soundtrack of the series Bait	

== See also ==
- Music of Pakistan
- Desi hip-hop
- Pakistani hip-hop
