= Lodhi (rapper) =

Lodhi لودھی
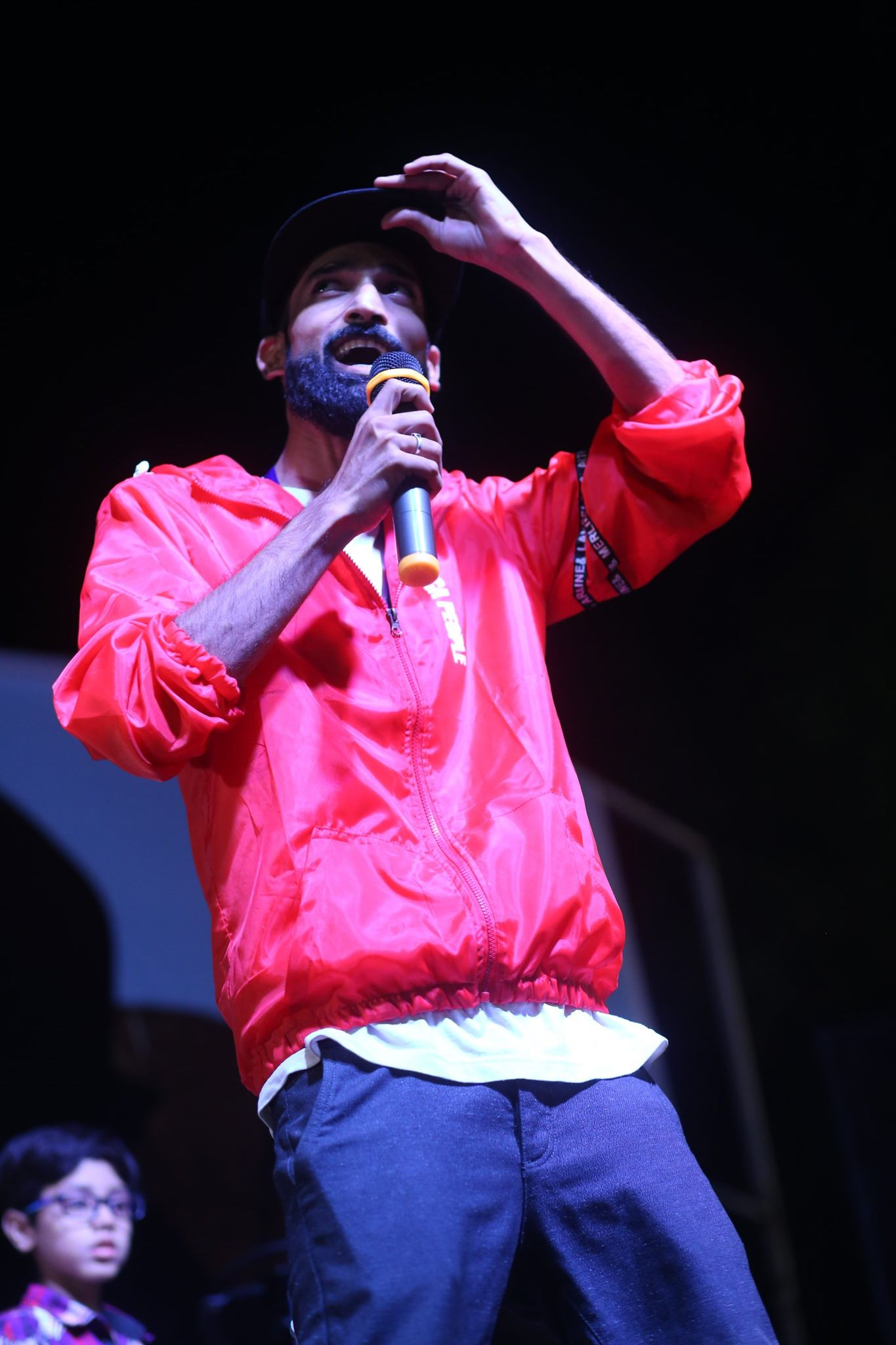
- Lodhi in 2019 in Bahawalpur. Source

Background information
- Born: Faiq Lodhi; Bahawalpur, Pakistan
- Origin: Bahawalpur, Pakistan
- Genres: Hip-Hop, Desi hip hop, Grime
- Occupations: Rapper, singer-songwriter
- Instruments: Vocals, lyrics, rapping
- Years active: 2015–present

Faiq Lodhi, better known by his stage name Lodhi or Lodhi Words, is a 2020 BBC Music Introducing desi hip hop artist.

== Personal life ==
Lodhi was born in Bahawalpur, Pakistan and attended Sadiq Public School. He currently lives in Hertfordshire, UK.

== Music career ==
Lodhi began writing poetry about his experience growing up in Bahawalpur. While living in the UK, Lodhi was influenced by the contemporary underground Grime scene. Lodhi is influenced by artists such as Nusrat Fateh Ali Khan and Nas. He has collaborated with artists such as Xpolymer Dar, Dialect, Illmatik, Sound Shikari, Hashim Nawaz, Ghauri, Hashim Ishaq, and DAKU.

Lodhi released his first EP, The Culture Shock in 2020. This release is a fusion of UK and Desi cultures and appeared on the BBC Asian Network’s Pakistani Music charts. Lodhi was featured on BBC Asian Network when his first track, "Jumma" was played as track of the week.

In November 2022, Lodhi performed at the first Going South music festival in London alongside artists such as Panjabi MC, Bobby Friction, Priya Ragu and others.

== Discography ==
=== EP Albums ===
Album title	Songs	Artists
BITS (Best in the Scene) Album (2022)	Crash Course Freestyle	Lodhi
	Yariyan	Lodhi, Kh44ki, Sheroz
	Kalak	Lodhi, Moaaz, Brown
	Haavi	Lodhi
	Fark	Lodhi, DAKU
	Sarsari	Lodhi, Bobby Rex
	Khoonkhaar	Lodhi, Polymath, HAMZEE
The Culture Shock EP (2020)	Jumma	Lodhi (prod. by Sound Shikari)
	Dewana	Lodhi (prod. by Sheroz)
	Halchal	Lodhi ft. Dialect, Xpolymer Dar (prod. by Sheroz)

=== Singles ===
Title	Artist info
Akhiyan (2022)	Lodhi
Buray Di Yaari (2022)	Lodhi, Shehroz, Professor Banner
Katana (2022)	Lodhi, Professor Banner, Shehroz
FreshWave session (2021)	Lodhi
The Relic - Freestyle (2021)	Lodhi (prod. by Shehroz)
Khaar (2021)	Lodhi ft. Hashim Ishaq & DAKU (prod. by Shaheen)
Wabaal (2020)	Lodhi ft. Hashim Nawaz (prod. Shehroz Baig)
Whip It (2018)	Lodhi x Illmatik (prod. by Ghauri)
