= Groove Mera =

2021 Pakistan Super League official anthem

Promotional single by various artists
- Language: Urdu; Punjabi
- Released: 6 February 2021
- Recorded: 2021
- Genre: Electronic dance music Stadium anthem
- Length: 3:02
- Label: Giraffe Pakistan
- Composer: Zulfiqar Jabbar Khan (Xulfi)
- Lyricists: Adnan Dhool; Young Stunners

Pakistan Super League anthems chronology
"Tayyar Hain" (2020)	"Groove Mera" (2021)	"Agay Dekh" (2022)

"Groove Mera" (Urdu: گروو میرا, lit. 'My Groove') is a 2021 song, written by Adnan Dhool, composed by Zulfiqar Jabbar Khan (Xulfi), and performed by Naseebo Lal and Aima Baig, with rap by Young Stunners. It served as the official anthem of the sixth season of the Pakistan Super League.

The anthem and its music video reflected the nature of the league to be viewed on streaming, due to the restrictions on stadium attendance in the aftermath of the COVID-19 pandemic. It opened to a polarised reception, with some people strongly criticising its execution, while others supporting a fresh take. The league's opening ceremony was also aired as a pre-recorded segment.

== Background and release ==
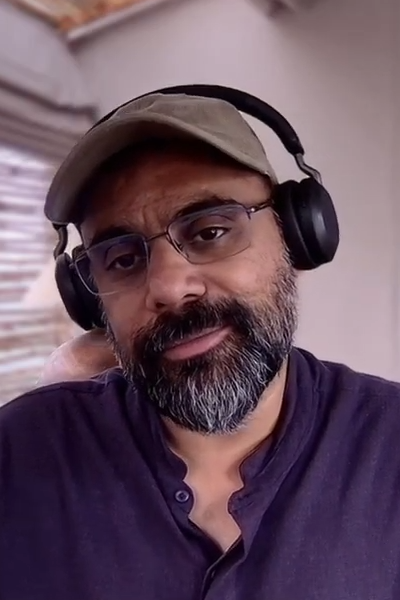
Xulfi

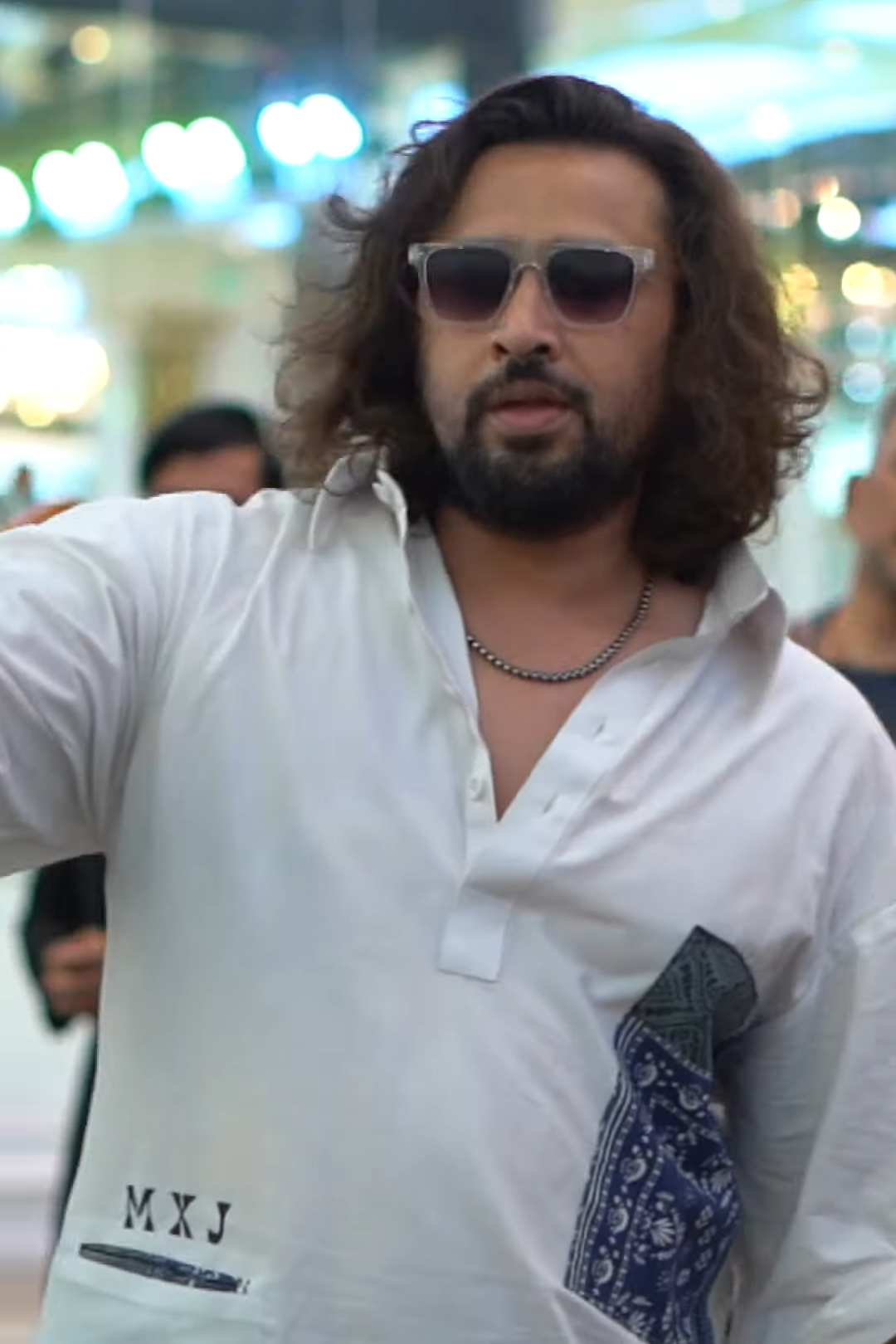
Adnan Dhool

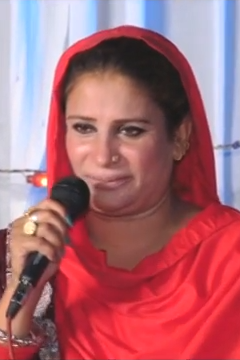
Naseebo Lal

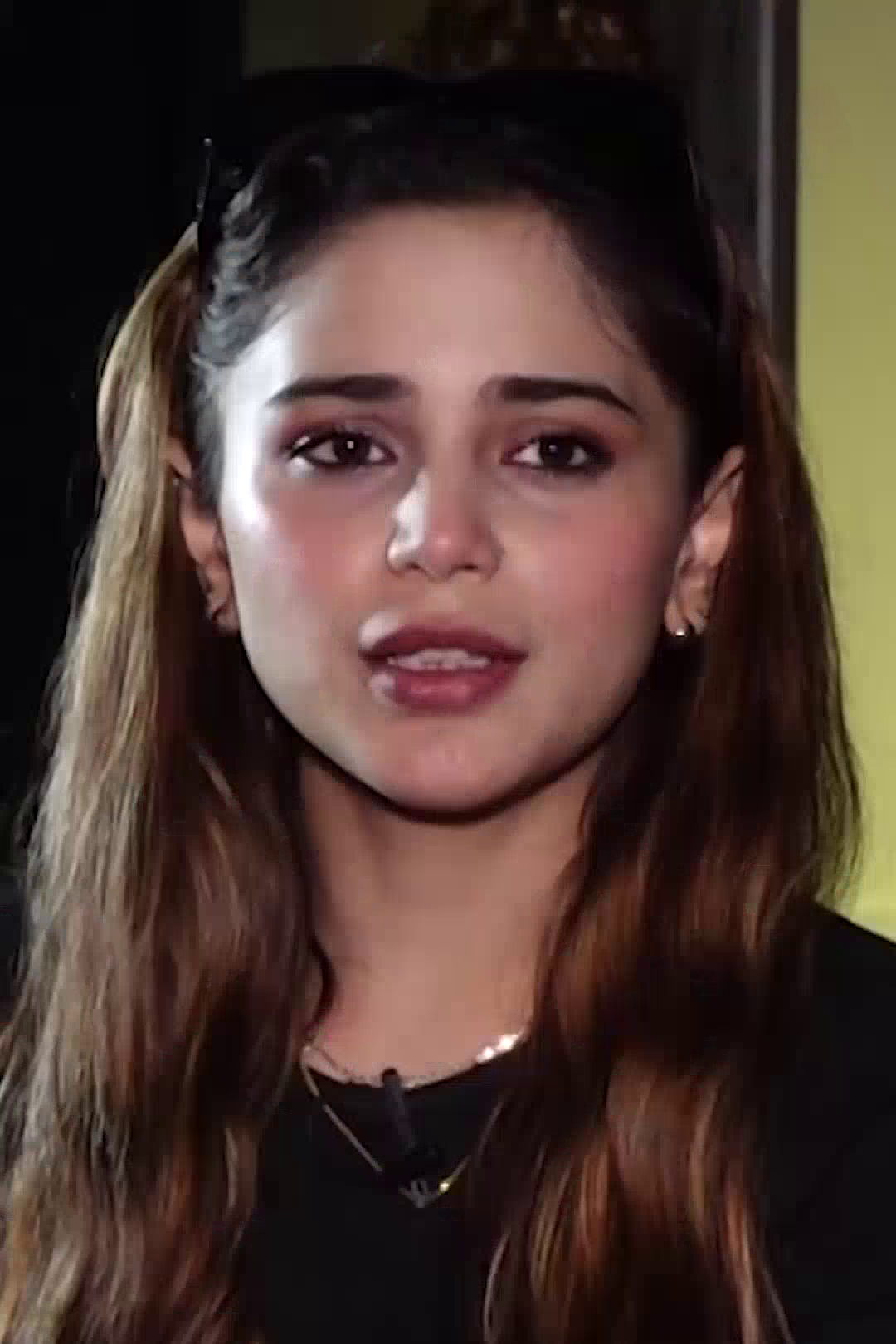
Aima Baig

Anthem artists

For the electronic dance music-inspired anthem, Adnan Dhool wrote the lyrics, Xulfi composed and produced the track, and Fida Moin directed the music video. The lyrics and the music video reflect the realities of the COVID-19 pandemic by depicting the audience watching the matches on television, mobile phones, and laptops. Independent Urdu quoted Xulfi that the term "Groove" should be taken in a broader way, like excitement and celebrations. Dawn quoted a PCB spokesperson that Naseebo Lal, Aima Baig, and Young Stunners were selected to promote musical diversity, as their voices were not heard before in the PSL. Naseebo Lal called this anthem as a unique opportunity in her career that she got to sing for Pakistan for the first time for more recognition.

"Groove Mera" was released on 6 February 2021 across music streaming services. It stars Pakistan national cricket team players Shadab Khan, Babar Azam, Shaheen Shah Afridi, Shan Masood, Wahab Riaz and Sarfaraz Ahmed, representing their respective teams, Islamabad United, Karachi Kings, Lahore Qalandars, Multan Sultans, Peshawar Zalmi, and Quetta Gladiators.

== Reception and impact ==
Within four days on YouTube, it was trending at number one in Pakistan, as well as a top trend in other countries including the United Arab Emirates, Qatar, Saudi Arabia, Oman, and Kuwait. It became then fastest PSL anthem to cross 10 million views on YouTube within twelve days.

The Express Tribune noted that the song "isn't as hard to listen to but it isn't a hit either" and that the production fell short in places. The News, The Express Tribune, and Dawn Images compiled public reactions from social media. The News initially noted that it had received "mixed reactions", but later noted "a polarising response" over it. Dawn Images concluded that no other song has "polarised the nation" as this "upbeat song", when some people are recalling "Ali Zafar's anthem yet again", others are "enjoying how catchy the" anthem is, while some others "didn't know what groove meant". Noting the public reactions, Adrian Sînă also asked if his group Akcent could make any PSL anthem.

Afreen Seher of Dawn, highlighted the anthem's significance that "the ratio of male and female singers is equal", by using "different forms of music (contemporary folk, funk and rap)" for "people of all age groups to boogie". Saad Nasir of ProPakistani wrote that "the song itself feels like what it was made for". Shahid Kazmi of Express News supported Naseebo Lal and criticised the public for trolling her. Maheen Sabeeh reviewed in The News that the song is "full of colour that can be embraced irrespective of the new normal". On Twitter, journalists like Qadir Khawaja called it a "pathetic" PSL anthem, while Arfa Feroz called it an anthem to "bang and dance" in stadium.

Shoaib Akhtar posted a review that "Groove Mera" was the "worst song" in the history of the PSL, and that it had scared his children. Firdous Ashiq Awan also criticised the anthem, saying it "could have been improved further". In response, a report in Dawn noted that "those who opposed it" faced "fierce criticism from some showbiz celebs", while Leon Menezes, a professor at IBA Karachi, wrote in Dawn Aurora that the criticism had "some unsettling undertones". Anoushey Ashraf commented the "difference of opinion is welcome" but one thing is to "not like a song", another thing is "to run down artists" like Akhtar did. Meesha Shafi praised the track as "a win over classism" and "a rigid system that favours only a selective few repeatedly". Adnan Siddiqui tweeted about the "keyboard warriors" who break someone's "hard work to pieces", and pointed towards the "songs Naseebo Lal has given". Later, ARY News reported a video of Naseebo Lal performing the song at a wedding ceremony as well.

In later years, Mera FM and 24 Digital respectively recalled and noted that the anthem had received "a lot of flak" for not living up to the expectations, and "huge criticism" for controversial content. In 2023, Manal Faheem Khan of Dawn appreciated it as the PSL's first "female-led anthem", while discussing the role of women in music. Zainab Sabir Mir of Geo News reported that the anthem had "since gained many fans" despite they were "initially divided". In 2024, Manahil Tahira of The Express Tribune noted that the anthem's "innovative turn" for the "contemporary taste" was "felt at odds" by the fans. In 2025, Ahmer Naqvi wrote in Dunya Digital that Naseebo Lal was the "most ideal musician" while Aima Baig and Young Stunners were "forced inclusion". In 2026, Ali A. Rizvi of The Jungle Today called it an "accidental mythology" and "weirdly beloved" anthem, by comparing it with a survived disaster.

On YouTube, it became second most-viewed PSL anthem after "Ab Khel Jamay Ga", as well as the most-liked and the most-disliked video out of all the PSL anthems. (Note: The fact is directly obtained from Pakistan Super League's YouTube channel, and as reported by City42 News, Dunya Digital, and The News.)

== Opening ceremony ==
On 13 February 2021, Atique ur Rehman of Geo News reported that the opening ceremony would be telecast as a virtual programme after being recorded in Istanbul, Turkey, instead of having a live ceremony. A day later, the PSL announced the names of performing artists, after Ali Zafar clarified that he would not be performing there.

The segment was aired before the opening match on 20 February at the National Stadium, Karachi. It was opened with "Qaumi Taranah", followed by a speech by then PCB chairman Ehsan Mani. Then, Imran Khan appeared with Humaima Malick, followed by Atif Aslam. The segment was closed with a performance of the anthem "Groove Mera" featuring its artists. Afterwards, fireworks were displayed live at the stadium, which was allowed to host only 7500 spectators due to the COVID-19 pandemic in Pakistan. Geo News reported that the ceremony cost around Rs. 20 crore.

== See also ==
External media

Audio
- Audio on YouTube

Video
- Music video on YouTube
- BTS on YouTube

- List of Pakistan Super League anthems
- Aima Baig discography
