= 2021 Pakistan Super League =

6th edition of the Pakistan Super League

Pakistan Super League 2021
- Official logo of HBL PSL 6 (Note: Official nomenclature)
- Dates: 20 February – 24 June 2021
- Administrator: Pakistan Cricket Board
- Cricket format: Twenty20
- Tournament format(s): Double round robin and playoffs
- Hosts: Pakistan; United Arab Emirates
- Champions: Multan Sultans (1st title)
- Runners-up: Peshawar Zalmi
- Participants: 6
- Matches: 34
- Attendance: 143,854 (4,231 per match)
- Player of the series: Sohaib Maqsood (MS) (428 runs)
- Most runs: Babar Azam (KK) (554)
- Most wickets: Shahnawaz Dahani (MS) (20)
- Official website: psl-t20.com

The 2021 Pakistan Super League (branded as HBL PSL 6) was the sixth edition of the Pakistan Super League, a professional Twenty20 cricket league established by the Pakistan Cricket Board (PCB). It was scheduled to be the second PSL edition to be held entirely in Pakistan in February and March 2021, after the previous editions were held abroad due to security concerns regarding hosting of international cricketing events at home.

On 4 March 2021, the PCB suspended the tournament with 14 of the scheduled 30 group matches having been played after multiple cases of COVID-19 were recorded. In March, the PCB proposed to reschedule the remaining fixtures for June 2021 with all matches to be held in Karachi, however, on 4 May, all the teams asked the PCB to move to the United Arab Emirates (UAE) because of a surge in COVID-19 cases in Pakistan.

On 20 May 2021, approval was granted to play the remaining matches of the PSL 6 in Abu Dhabi and the tournament restarted on 9 June. On 24 June 2021, Multan Sultans beat Peshawar Zalmi in the final, by 47 runs to win their first title.

== Background ==
The PSL was set up in 2015 and began in 2016 — meaning this was the sixth edition of the tournament. This was the third year of Habib Bank Limited's (HBL) sponsorship deal with the tournament. This was supposed to be the second season held entirely in Pakistan, owing to the security situation there in previous seasons which caused it to be held in the UAE. After the previous edition was postponed because of COVID-19 pandemic, the tournament was expected to be held behind closed doors. However, the Pakistani government gave approval to host the tournament at 20% capacity. An extra 10% could also have been allowed in after the group stage, but was not when the tournament moved to the UAE. Speaking about crowds, PCB chairman Ehsan Mani said that he hoped if they could maintain tight protocols during the tournament, they could increase capacity later in the year for future tours of Pakistan. It was rumored that starting from this edition, the PSL would have a dedicated window in the ICC Future Tours Programme.

== Squads ==
Islamabad United	Karachi Kings	Lahore Qalandars	Multan Sultans	Peshawar Zalmi	Quetta Gladiators
Shadab Khan (c); ~~Alex Hales~~; Colin Munro; Faheem Ashraf; Hussain Talat; Asif Ali; Muhammad Musa; Zafar Gohar; Hasan Ali; ~~Lewis Gregory~~; ~~Phil Salt~~; Rohail Nazir; ~~Reece Topley~~; Iftikhar Ahmed; Mohammad Wasim; Ahmed Safi Abdullah; ~~Chris Jordan~~; Akif Javed; Fawad Ahmed; ~~Paul Stirling~~; Ali Khan; Zeeshan Zameer	Imad Wasim (c); Babar Azam (vc); Mohammad Amir; ~~Colin Ingram~~; Aamer Yamin; Sharjeel Khan; Waqas Maqsood; Arshad Iqbal; ~~Mohammad Nabi~~; ~~Dan Christian~~; Chadwick Walton; ~~Joe Clarke~~; Danish Aziz; Mohammad Ilyas; Zeeshan Malik; Qasim Akram; Noor Ahmad; Abbas Afridi	Sohail Akhtar (c); Mohammad Hafeez; Shaheen Afridi (vc); Fakhar Zaman; ~~David Wiese~~; Haris Rauf; Ben Dunk; Dilbar Hussain; Rashid Khan; ~~Samit Patel~~; ~~Tom Abell~~; Zeeshan Ashraf; Agha Salman; Muhammad Faizan; Maaz Khan; Muhammad Zaid; ~~Joe Denly~~; Ahmed Daniyal; ~~Salman Mirza~~; ~~Sandeep Lamichhane~~	Mohammad Rizwan (c); ~~Shahid Afridi~~; Rilee Rossouw; Sohail Tanvir; Imran Tahir; Khushdil Shah; ~~James Vince~~; Usman Qadir; ~~Chris Lynn~~; Sohail Khan; Sohaib Maqsood; Shan Masood; Sohaibullah; ~~Adam Lyth~~; Shahnawaz Dahani; Mohammad Umar; Imran Khan; ~~Carlos Brathwaite~~	Wahab Riaz (c); Shoaib Malik (vc); Kamran Akmal; ~~Liam Livingstone~~; Haider Ali; David Miller; ~~Mujeeb Ur Rahman~~; Sherfane Rutherford; Amad Butt; Umaid Asif; ~~Saqib Mahmood~~; Imam-ul-Haq; Mohammad Imran; Mohammad Irfan; Abrar Ahmed; Mohammad Imran; ~~Ravi Bopara~~; Mohammad Amir Khan; ~~Tom Kohler-Cadmore~~; Waqar Salamkheil	Sarfaraz Ahmed (c); ~~Ben Cutting~~; Mohammad Hasnain; Mohammad Nawaz (vc); Azam Khan; Naseem Shah; Zahid Mahmood; ~~Anwar Ali~~; ~~Chris Gayle~~; ~~Tom Banton~~; Usman Shinwari; Cameron Delport; ~~Qais Ahmad~~; Abdul Nasir; Saim Ayub; Arish Ali Khan; ~~Dale Steyn~~; Usman Khan; Faf du Plessis; Hasan Khan
Additional players selected for the remaining matches
Usman Khawaja (vc); ~~Janneman Malan~~; Muhammad Akhlaq; Umar Amin; Brandon King	Martin Guptill; Thisara Perera; Najibullah Zadran; ~~Liton Das~~; Mohammad Haris	~~Shakib Al Hasan~~; James Faulkner; ~~Joe Burns~~; Callum Ferguson; Seekkuge Prasanna; Tim David; Sultan Ahmed	~~Mahmudullah~~; Rahmanullah Gurbaz; ~~George Linde~~; ~~Obed McCoy~~; Shimron Hetmyer; Johnson Charles; Muhammad Waseem; Hammad Azam; Asif Afridi; Blessing Muzarabani	Fabian Allen; Rovman Powell; Fidel Edwards; Bismillah Khan; Hazratullah Zazai; Sameen Gul; Khalid Usman; Jonathan Wells	Andre Russell; Zahir Khan; Jack Wildermuth; Khurram Shahzad; Jake Weatherald; Zahoor Khan
Note: Players that have been struck-through were unable to participate in the tournament.

On 9 January 2021, the PCB announced the retained players' list. The players draft took place on 10 January in Lahore. On 15 February, Mohammad Rizwan replaced Shan Masood as the captain of the Multan Sultans.

Later, a replacement draft was held, in which additional players were picked up to replace players unavailable due to COVID-19 pandemic, which also forced the rescheduling of the tournament. On 27 April, Colin Munro rejoined Islamabad United for the remaining matches. The final squads were confirmed by 22 May, when the Lahore Qalandars re-signed Rashid Khan after his replacement Shakib Al Hasan pulled out of the PSL.

== Venues ==
In June 2020, the PCB announced they planned to add Arbab Niaz Stadium, Peshawar, as a fifth venue in this edition of the PSL. However, delays in the stadium's construction made it difficult to host the tournament's matches. The PCB planned to hold a few matches in Faisalabad and Hyderabad, as well. In addition, the Hayatabad Stadium was announced as a possible venue for some matches. In September 2020, the PCB confirmed that both the Arbab Niaz Stadium in Peshawar and Bugti Stadium in Quetta, could not host this season's matches. However, it was later decided that the tournament would be held only at Karachi and Lahore. After the tournament was moved to the UAE, the remaining matches took place at the Sheikh Zayed Cricket Stadium.

Pakistan	United Arab Emirates
Karachi	Abu Dhabi
National Stadium	Sheikh Zayed Cricket Stadium
Capacity: 32,000	Capacity: 20,000
2021 Pakistan Super League is located in Pakistan	2021 Pakistan Super League is located in United Arab Emirates

The stadiums were initially allowed to hold only 20% capacity per match; 7,500 in Karachi and 5,500 in Lahore; in view of COVID-19 pandemic in Pakistan. Tickets were available only online via Pakistan's online ticketing platform Bookme.pk, from 11 February.

== Match officials ==
=== Umpires ===
- Faisal Afridi
- Aleem Dar
- Michael Gough
- Zameer Haider
- Richard Illingworth
- Imran Javed
- Ahsan Raza
- Shozab Raza
- Rashid Riaz
- Asif Yaqoob

=== Referees ===
- Iftikhar Ahmed
- Mohammed Anees
- Muhammad Javed
- Roshan Mahanama
- Ali Naqvi

== Marketing ==
The league was promoted on social media with the hashtags #MatchDikhao and #HBLPSL6, and the official anthem Groove Mera by Naseebo Lal, Aima Baig and Young Stunners.

For the first time, five more tracks were released on the cricket album called HBL PSL Taranay, and a pre-recorded virtual opening ceremony was held.

== COVID-19 pandemic impact ==
The day before the tournament was due to start, Wahab Riaz and Daren Sammy, both of Peshawar Zalmi, were put in isolation after they met with team owner Javed Afridi, who was not part of the bubble. However, after they both received results of a negative COVID test, they were allowed to rejoin the team.

On 1 March, Fawad Ahmed of Islamabad United was reported to have tested positive for COVID-19, which led to the postponement of their match against Quetta Gladiators by one day. On 4 March, it was reported that three more players had tested positive, including Tom Banton and a support staff member. Later that day, it was announced that the tournament had been suspended after seven new cases were reported. Dr Sohail Saleem, Head of the Medical Panel, submitted his resignation to chairman Ehsan Mani following increasing criticism over the abrupt postponement of the tournament.

After the postponement, the PCB formed a two-member fact-finding committee to investigate the causes behind the bio-secure bubble breaches.

The PCB announced on 11 March that they were looking to reschedule the remaining fixtures for June 2021. A week later, they proposed the tournament would either start on either 2 or 6 June, finishing on 20 June with all matches to take place in Karachi.

On 11 April, the PCB announced the tournament's revised schedule with the competition due to restart on 1 June. On 4 May 2021, all the teams asked the PCB to move the remaining matches to the UAE because of an increase of COVID-19 in Pakistan.

The Emirates Cricket Board (ECB) gave green light to the Pakistan Cricket Board for holding the remaining matches of the PSL 2021 in Abu Dhabi on 18 May. However, it was also reported that the Abu Dhabi government put forward a condition that all the participants needed to be vaccinated against COVID-19. Following this, the PCB and the team owners held a virtual meeting on 19 May to review all potential scenarios and unanimously agreed to wait until the close of business on 20 May (UAE time) regarding clarifications on certain requested exemptions before a final decision on the hosting of the remaining matches was made. In May 2021, the Pakistan Super League finally secured all exemptions and approvals required to conduct the remainder of the 2021 season in Abu Dhabi.

Another bubble breach took place after the resumption of the tournament, this time the day before the final. Haider Ali and Umaid Asif, both of Peshawar Zalmi, admitted that they had met people from outside their bubble and were suspended from competing in the final.

== League stage ==
=== Format ===
PSL playoffs system

The PSL is played in a double round-robin format. Every team plays each other twice and the top four advance to the playoffs. The playoffs use the Page playoff system, like the Indian Premier League.

The league follows the rules and regulations dictated by the International Cricket Council. However, it introduced DRS system in T20s which was later emulated by International Cricket Council as well. In the group stage, two points are awarded for a win, one for a no-result and none for a loss. In the event of tied scores after both teams have faced their quota of overs, a super over is used to determine the match winner. In the group stage teams are ranked on the following criteria:

1. Higher number of points
2. If equal, better run rate
3. If equal, highest number of wins
4. If equal, fewest losses
5. If still equal, the results of head-to-head meeting

In any play-off match in which there is no result, a super over is used to determine the winner. If the super over is not possible or the result of the over is a tie, the team which finished in the highest league position at the end of the regular season is deemed the winner of the match.

=== Points table ===
Pos	Team	Pld	W	L	NR	Pts	NRR
1	Islamabad United (3rd)	10	8	2	0	16	0.859
2	Multan Sultans (C)	10	5	5	0	10	1.050
3	Peshawar Zalmi (R)	10	5	5	0	10	0.586
4	Karachi Kings (4th)	10	5	5	0	10	−0.115
5	Lahore Qalandars	10	5	5	0	10	−0.589
6	Quetta Gladiators	10	2	8	0	4	−1.786

Source: ESPNcricinfo
- The top 4 teams qualified for the playoffs
- advanced to Qualifier
- advanced to Eliminator 1

=== Summary ===
Visitor team →	IU	KK	LQ	MS	PZ	QG
Home team ↓	IU	KK	LQ	MS	PZ	QG
Islamabad United		Islamabad; 8 wickets	Islamabad; 28 runs	Islamabad; 3 wickets	Islamabad; 15 runs	Islamabad; 6 wickets
Karachi Kings	Islamabad; 5 wickets		Lahore; 6 wickets	Karachi; 7 wickets	Karachi; 6 wickets	Karachi; 7 wickets
Lahore Qalandars	Lahore; 5 wickets	Karachi; 7 runs		Multan; 7 wickets	Lahore; 4 wickets	Lahore; 9 wickets
Multan Sultans	Islamabad; 4 wickets	Multan; 12 runs	Multan; 80 runs		Multan; 8 wickets	Multan; 110 runs
Peshawar Zalmi	Peshawar; 6 wickets	Peshawar; 6 wickets	Lahore; 10 runs	Peshawar; 6 wickets		Peshawar; 3 wickets
Quetta Gladiators	Islamabad; 10 wickets	Karachi; 14 runs	Quetta; 18 runs	Quetta; 22 runs	Peshawar; 61 runs	

Home team won	Visitor team won

- Note: Results listed are according to the home (horizontal) and visitor (vertical) teams.
- Note: Click on a result to see a summary of the match.

=== League progression ===
Team	Group matches										Playoffs		
Team	1	2	3	4	5	6	7	8	9	10	E1/Q	E2	F
Islamabad United	2	4	4	6	6	8	10	12	14	16	L	L	
Karachi Kings	2	2	4	4	6	6	6	6	8	10	L		
Lahore Qalandars	2	4	4	6	8	10	10	10	10	10			
Multan Sultans	0	0	2	2	2	4	6	8	10	10	W		W
Peshawar Zalmi	0	2	4	6	6	6	8	8	10	10	W	W	L
Quetta Gladiators	0	0	0	0	2	2	2	4	4	4			

Win	Loss	No result

- Note: The total points at the end of each group match are listed.
- Note: Click on the points (group matches) or W/L (playoffs) to see the match summary.

== Fixtures ==
The PCB confirmed the fixtures for the tournament on 8 January 2021. The tournament was initially scheduled to take place in February and March.

=== Pakistan ===
Match 1
20 February 2021
20:00 (N)
Scorecard

Quetta Gladiators; 121 (18.2 overs)	v	Karachi Kings (H); 126/3 (13.5 overs)
Chris Gayle 39 (24); Arshad Iqbal 3/16 (4 overs)		Joe Clarke 46 (23); Mohammad Hasnain 2/18 (4 overs)

Karachi Kings won by 7 wickets
National Stadium, Karachi
Umpires: Aleem Dar (Pak) and Ahsan Raza (Pak)
Player of the match: Arshad Iqbal (Karachi Kings)

- Karachi Kings won the toss and elected to field.

Match 2
21 February 2021
14:00 (D/N)
Scorecard

Peshawar Zalmi; 140/6 (20 overs)	v	Lahore Qalandars; 143/6 (18.3 overs)
Ravi Bopara 50 (44); Shaheen Afridi 3/14 (4 overs)		Mohammad Hafeez 33* (26); Saqib Mahmood 2/22 (4 overs)

Lahore Qalandars won by 4 wickets
National Stadium, Karachi
Umpires: Shozab Raza (Pak) and Rashid Riaz (Pak)
Player of the match: Shaheen Afridi (Lahore Qalandars)

- Lahore Qalandars won the toss and elected to field.

Match 3
21 February 2021
19:00 (N)
Scorecard

Multan Sultans; 150/8 (20 overs)	v	Islamabad United; 151/7 (19 overs)
Mohammad Rizwan 71 (53); Mohammad Wasim 3/29 (4 overs)		Lewis Gregory 49* (31); Carlos Brathwaite 2/23 (4 overs)

Islamabad United won by 3 wickets
National Stadium, Karachi
Umpires: Richard Illingworth (Eng) and Ahsan Raza (Pak)
Player of the match: Lewis Gregory (Islamabad United)

- Islamabad United won the toss and elected to field.

Match 4
22 February 2021
19:00 (N)
Scorecard

Quetta Gladiators; 178/6 (20 overs)	v	Lahore Qalandars; 179/1 (18.2 overs)
Chris Gayle 68 (40); Haris Rauf 3/38 (4 overs)		Fakhar Zaman 82* (52); Zahid Mahmood 1/28 (3 overs)

Lahore Qalandars won by 9 wickets
National Stadium, Karachi
Umpires: Aleem Dar (Pak) and Asif Yaqoob (Pak)
Player of the match: Fakhar Zaman (Lahore Qalandars)

- Lahore Qalandars won the toss and elected to field.

Match 5
23 February 2021
19:00 (N)
Scorecard

Multan Sultans; 193/4 (20 overs)	v	Peshawar Zalmi; 197/4 (19 overs)
James Vince 84 (55); Saqib Mahmood 2/36 (4 overs)		Tom Kohler-Cadmore 53 (32); Shahnawaz Dahani 2/44 (4 overs)

Peshawar Zalmi won by 6 wickets
National Stadium, Karachi
Umpires: Richard Illingworth (Eng) and Aleem Dar (Pak)
Player of the match: Tom Kohler-Cadmore (Peshawar Zalmi)

- Peshawar Zalmi won the toss and elected to field.

Match 6
24 February 2021
19:00 (N)
Scorecard

(H) Karachi Kings; 196/3 (20 overs)	v	Islamabad United; 197/5 (19.1 overs)
Sharjeel Khan 105 (59); Hussain Talat 1/25 (2 overs)		Iftikhar Ahmed 49* (37); Waqas Maqsood 1/22 (2.1 overs)

Islamabad United won by 5 wickets
National Stadium, Karachi
Umpires: Aleem Dar (Pak) and Rashid Riaz (Pak)
Player of the match: Alex Hales (Islamabad United)

- Islamabad United won the toss and elected to field.

Match 7
26 February 2021
15:00 (D/N)
Scorecard

Lahore Qalandars; 157/6 (20 overs)	v	Multan Sultans; 159/3 (16.2 overs)
Mohammad Hafeez 60 (35); Carlos Brathwaite 2/20 (4 overs)		Mohammad Rizwan 76 (49); Shaheen Afridi 2/29 (4 overs)

Multan Sultans won by 7 wickets
National Stadium, Karachi
Umpires: Faisal Afridi (Pak) and Aleem Dar (Pak)
Player of the match: Mohammad Rizwan (Multan Sultans)

- Multan Sultans won the toss and elected to field.

Match 8
26 February 2021
20:00 (N)
Scorecard

Quetta Gladiators; 198/7 (20 overs)	v	Peshawar Zalmi; 202/7 (19.3 overs)
Sarfaraz Ahmed 81 (40); Saqib Mahmood 3/34 (4 overs)		Haider Ali 50 (29); Dale Steyn 2/44 (4 overs)

Peshawar Zalmi won by 3 wickets
National Stadium, Karachi
Umpires: Richard Illingworth (Eng) and Asif Yaqoob (Pak)
Player of the match: Haider Ali (Peshawar Zalmi)

- Peshawar Zalmi won the toss and elected to field.

Match 9
27 February 2021
14:00 (D/N)
Scorecard

Multan Sultans; 195/6 (20 overs)	v	Karachi Kings (H); 198/3 (18.5 overs)
James Vince 45 (29); Arshad Iqbal 2/36 (4 overs)		Babar Azam 90* (60); Shahnawaz Dahani 2/28 (3 overs)

Karachi Kings won by 7 wickets
National Stadium, Karachi
Umpires: Richard Illingworth (Eng) and Rashid Riaz (Pak)
Player of the match: Babar Azam (Karachi Kings)

- Karachi Kings won the toss and elected to field.

Match 10
27 February 2021
19:00 (N)
Scorecard

Islamabad United; 118 (17.1 overs)	v	Peshawar Zalmi; 122/4 (17.1 overs)
Alex Hales 41 (27); Wahab Riaz 4/17 (4 overs)		Tom Kohler-Cadmore 46 (46); Hasan Ali 2/14 (4 overs)

Peshawar Zalmi won by 6 wickets
National Stadium, Karachi
Umpires: Shozab Raza (Pak) and Asif Yaqoob (Pak)
Player of the match: Wahab Riaz (Peshawar Zalmi)

- Peshawar Zalmi won the toss and elected to field.

Match 11
28 February 2021
19:00 (N)
Scorecard

(H) Karachi Kings; 186/9 (20 overs)	v	Lahore Qalandars; 189/4 (19.2 overs)
Sharjeel Khan 64 (39); Shaheen Afridi 3/27 (4 overs)		Fakhar Zaman 83 (54); Waqas Maqsood 1/34 (3 overs)

Lahore Qalandars won by 6 wickets
National Stadium, Karachi
Umpires: Richard Illingworth (Eng) and Ahsan Raza (Pak)
Player of the match: Shaheen Afridi (Lahore Qalandars)

- Lahore Qalandars won the toss and elected to field.

Match 12
1−2 March 2021
19:00 (N)
Scorecard

Quetta Gladiators; 156/7 (20 overs)	v	Islamabad United; 157/4 (17 overs)
Sarfaraz Ahmed 54 (41); Faheem Ashraf 3/11 (4 overs)		Paul Stirling 56 (33); Zahid Mahmood 2/29 (4 overs)

Islamabad United won by 6 wickets
National Stadium, Karachi
Umpires: Ahsan Raza (Pak) and Shozab Raza (Pak)
Player of the match: Faheem Ashraf (Islamabad United)

- Islamabad United won the toss and elected to field.
- The match was postponed for one day due to Fawad Ahmed testing Positive for COVID-19.

Match 13
3 March 2021
14:00 (D/N)
Scorecard

Peshawar Zalmi; 188/5 (20 overs)	v	Karachi Kings (H); 191/4 (19.3 overs)
Ravi Bopara 58* (40); Abbas Afridi 2/27 (4 overs)		Babar Azam 77* (47); Saqib Mahmood 2/41 (4 overs)

Karachi Kings won by 6 wickets
National Stadium, Karachi
Umpires: Aleem Dar (Pak) and Imran Javed (Pak)
Player of the match: Mohammad Nabi (Karachi Kings)

- Karachi Kings won the toss and elected to field.

Match 14
3 March 2021
19:00 (N)
Scorecard

Quetta Gladiators; 176/7 (20 overs)	v	Multan Sultans; 154 (19.4 overs)
Usman Khan 81 (50); Shahnawaz Dahani 3/44 (4 overs)		Mohammad Rizwan 66 (50); Qais Ahmad 3/21 (4 overs)

Quetta Gladiators won by 22 runs
National Stadium, Karachi
Umpires: Faisal Afridi (Pak) and Asif Yaqoob (Pak)
Player of the match: Qais Ahmad (Quetta Gladiators)

- Multan Sultans won the toss and elected to field.

=== United Arab Emirates ===
Match 15
9 June 2021
21:00 (N)
Scorecard

Islamabad United; 143/9 (20 overs)	v	Lahore Qalandars; 144/5 (20 overs)
Faheem Ashraf 27 (24); James Faulkner 3/32 (4 overs)		Sohail Akhtar 40 (30); Hasan Ali 2/27 (4 overs)

Lahore Qalandars won by 5 wickets
Sheikh Zayed Cricket Stadium, Abu Dhabi
Umpires: Aleem Dar (Pak) and Rashid Riaz (Pak)
Player of the match: Rashid Khan (Lahore Qalandars)

- Lahore Qalandars won the toss and elected to field.

Match 16
10 June 2021
18:00 (D/N)
Scorecard

Multan Sultans; 176/5 (20 overs)	v	Karachi Kings; 164/7 (20 overs)
Rilee Rossouw 44 (24); Thisara Perera 2/12 (3 overs)		Babar Azam 85* (63); Imran Khan 3/28 (4 overs)

Multan Sultans won by 12 runs
Sheikh Zayed Cricket Stadium, Abu Dhabi
Umpires: Aleem Dar (Pak) and Shozab Raza (Pak)
Player of the match: Rilee Rossouw (Multan Sultans)

- Karachi Kings won the toss and elected to field.

Match 17
10 June 2021
23:00 (N)
Scorecard

Lahore Qalandars; 170/8 (20 overs)	v	Peshawar Zalmi; 160/8 (20 overs)
Tim David 64* (36); Fabian Allen 2/36 (3 overs)		Shoaib Malik 73 (48); Rashid Khan 5/20 (4 overs)

Lahore Qalandars won by 10 runs
Sheikh Zayed Cricket Stadium, Abu Dhabi
Umpires: Rashid Riaz (Pak) and Asif Yaqoob (Pak)
Player of the match: Rashid Khan (Lahore Qalandars)

- Peshawar Zalmi won the toss and elected to field.

Match 18
11 June 2021
21:00 (N)
Scorecard

Quetta Gladiators; 133 (20 overs)	v	Islamabad United; 137/0 (10 overs)
Jake Weatherald 43 (35); Mohammad Wasim 2/12 (4 overs)		Colin Munro 90* (36)

Islamabad United won by 10 wickets
Sheikh Zayed Cricket Stadium, Abu Dhabi
Umpires: Aleem Dar (Pak) and Shozab Raza (Pak)
Player of the match: Colin Munro (Islamabad United)

- Islamabad United won the toss and elected to field.
- Naseem Shah replaced Andre Russell as a concussion substitute for Quetta Gladiators.

Match 19
12 June 2021
21:00 (N)
Scorecard

Peshawar Zalmi; 197/5 (20 overs)	v	Quetta Gladiators; 136/9 (20 overs)
David Miller 73 (46); Mohammad Nawaz 2/33 (4 overs)		Sarfaraz Ahmed 36* (28); Mohammad Irfan 3/27 (4 overs)

Peshawar Zalmi won by 61 runs
Sheikh Zayed Cricket Stadium, Abu Dhabi
Umpires: Ahsan Raza (Pak) and Shozab Raza (Pak)
Player of the match: David Miller (Peshawar Zalmi)

- Quetta Gladiators won the toss and elected to field.
- Saim Ayub replaced Faf du Plessis as a concussion substitute for Quetta Gladiators.

Match 20
13 June 2021
18:00 (D/N)
Scorecard

Islamabad United; 152/7 (20 overs)	v	Lahore Qalandars; 124 (18.2 overs)
Asif Ali 75 (43); James Faulkner 3/19 (4 overs)		Fakhar Zaman 44 (37); Muhammad Musa 3/18 (3 overs)

Islamabad United won by 28 runs
Sheikh Zayed Cricket Stadium, Abu Dhabi
Umpires: Shozab Raza (Pak) and Asif Yaqoob (Pak)
Player of the match: Asif Ali (Islamabad United)

- Islamabad United won the toss and elected to bat.

Match 21
13 June 2021
23:00 (N)
Scorecard

Peshawar Zalmi; 166/7 (20 overs)	v	Multan Sultans; 167/2 (16.3 overs)
Sherfane Rutherford 56 (40); Shahnawaz Dahani 4/31 (4 overs)		Mohammad Rizwan 82* (56); Mohammad Irfan 1/24 (4 overs)

Multan Sultans won by 8 wickets
Sheikh Zayed Cricket Stadium, Abu Dhabi
Umpires: Aleem Dar (Pak) and Ahsan Raza (Pak)
Player of the match: Shahnawaz Dahani (Multan Sultans)

- Multan Sultans won the toss and elected to field.

Match 22
14 June 2021
21:00 (N)
Scorecard

Karachi Kings; 190/4 (20 overs)	v	Islamabad United; 191/2 (18.4 overs)
Babar Azam 81 (54); Akif Javed 1/31 (4 overs); Hasan Ali 1/31 (4 overs)		Colin Munro 88* (56); Waqas Maqsood 1/27 (4 overs)

Islamabad United won by 8 wickets
Sheikh Zayed Cricket Stadium, Abu Dhabi
Umpires: Rashid Riaz (Pak) and Asif Yaqoob (Pak)
Player of the match: Iftikhar Ahmed (Islamabad United)

- Islamabad United won the toss and elected to field.

Match 23
15 June 2021
18:00 (D/N)
Scorecard

Quetta Gladiators; 158/5 (20 overs)	v	Lahore Qalandars; 140 (18 overs)
Jake Weatherald 48 (41); James Faulkner 3/25 (4 overs)		Tim David 46 (27); Khurram Shahzad 3/14 (3 overs)

Quetta Gladiators won by 18 runs
Sheikh Zayed Cricket Stadium, Abu Dhabi
Umpires: Aleem Dar (Pak) and Rashid Riaz (Pak)
Player of the match: Usman Shinwari (Quetta Gladiators)

- Lahore Qalandars won the toss and elected to field.

Match 24
15 June 2021
23:00 (N)
Scorecard

Karachi Kings; 108/9 (20 overs)	v	Peshawar Zalmi; 109/4 (11 overs)
Abbas Afridi 27* (18); Abrar Ahmed 3/14 (4 overs)		Hazratullah Zazai 63 (26); Imad Wasim 2/2 (2 overs)

Peshawar Zalmi won by 6 wickets
Sheikh Zayed Cricket Stadium, Abu Dhabi
Umpires: Ahsan Raza (Pak) and Shozab Raza (Pak)
Player of the match: Hazratullah Zazai (Peshawar Zalmi)

- Peshawar Zalmi won the toss and elected to field.

Match 25
16 June 2021
21:00 (N)
Scorecard

Multan Sultans; 183/5 (20 overs)	v	Quetta Gladiators; 73 (12.1 overs)
Shan Masood 73 (42); Khurram Shahzad 2/26 (4 overs)		Jake Weatherald 19 (10); Imran Tahir 3/7 (2 overs)

Multan Sultans won by 110 runs
Sheikh Zayed Cricket Stadium, Abu Dhabi
Umpires: Aleem Dar (Pak) and Shozab Raza (Pak)
Player of the match: Shan Masood (Multan Sultans)

- Quetta Gladiators won the toss and elected to field.
- As a result of this match, Quetta Gladiators were eliminated from the tournament.

Match 26
17 June 2021
18:00 (D/N)
Scorecard

Islamabad United; 247/2 (20 overs)	v	Peshawar Zalmi; 232/6 (20 overs)
Usman Khawaja 105* (56); Shoaib Malik 1/14 (2 overs)		Shoaib Malik 68 (36); Akif Javed 3/43 (4 overs)

Islamabad United won by 15 runs
Sheikh Zayed Cricket Stadium, Abu Dhabi
Umpires: Shozab Raza (Pak) and Rashid Riaz (Pak)
Player of the match: Usman Khawaja (Islamabad United)

- Peshawar Zalmi won the toss and elected to field.

Match 27
17 June 2021
23:00 (N)
Scorecard

Karachi Kings; 176/5 (20 overs)	v	Lahore Qalandars; 169/7 (20 overs)
Babar Azam 54 (44); Rashid Khan 2/25 (4 overs)		Mohammad Hafeez 36 (36); Noor Ahmad 2/19 (4 overs)

Karachi Kings won by 7 runs
Sheikh Zayed Cricket Stadium, Abu Dhabi
Umpires: Ahsan Raza (Pak) and Asif Yaqoob (Pak)
Player of the match: Noor Ahmad (Karachi Kings)

- Karachi Kings won the toss and elected to bat.

Match 28
18 June 2021
21:00 (N)
Scorecard

Multan Sultans; 169/8 (20 overs)	v	Lahore Qalandars; 89 (15.1 overs)
Sohaib Maqsood 60 (40); Shaheen Afridi 3/23 (4 overs)		James Faulkner 22 (11); Shahnawaz Dahani 4/5 (3.1 overs)

Multan Sultans won by 80 runs
Sheikh Zayed Cricket Stadium, Abu Dhabi
Umpires: Aleem Dar (Pak) and Shozab Raza (Pak)
Player of the match: Shahnawaz Dahani (Multan Sultans)

- Lahore Qalandars won the toss and elected to field.

Match 29
19 June 2021
18:00 (D/N)
Scorecard

Karachi Kings; 176/7 (20 overs)	v	Quetta Gladiators; 162/6 (20 overs)
Danish Aziz 45 (13); Arish Ali Khan 4/28 (4 overs)		Sarfaraz Ahmed 51* (33); Mohammad Ilyas 3/39 (4 overs)

Karachi Kings won by 14 runs
Sheikh Zayed Cricket Stadium, Abu Dhabi
Umpires: Shozab Raza (Pak) and Asif Yaqoob (Pak)
Player of the match: Danish Aziz (Karachi Kings)

- Karachi Kings won the toss and elected to bat.

Match 30
19 June 2021
23:00 (N)
Scorecard

Multan Sultans; 149 (20 overs)	v	Islamabad United; 150/6 (19.4 overs)
Shan Masood 59 (37); Mohammad Wasim 4/31 (4 overs)		Shadab Khan 35 (27); Shahnawaz Dahani 2/21 (4 overs)

Islamabad United won by 4 wickets
Sheikh Zayed Cricket Stadium, Abu Dhabi
Umpires: Aleem Dar (Pak) and Rashid Riaz (Pak)
Player of the match: Mohammad Wasim (Islamabad United)

- Islamabad United won the toss and elected to field.

=== Summary ===
==== Week 1 ====
In the opening game of PSL 2021, the Karachi Kings beat the Quetta Gladiators by 7 wickets. For Karachi, Joe Clarke scored 46 off 23 to help register their first win of the season. While in game two, Rashid Khan made his debut for the Lahore Qalandars, helping them to a 4 wicket win over Peshawar Zalmi. In game three, Lewis Gregory proved his worth to Islamabad United against the Multan Sultans. He scored 49 runs off 31 balls to give his team a 3 wicket win. The next day, Lahore were looking to continue their winning start against Quetta. They did this with half centuries from Mohammad Hafeez and Fakhar Zaman propelling them to a 9 wicket win. Tom Kohler-Cadmore helped himself to 53 to register Peshawar's first win of the season against Multan. James Vince earlier scored 84 to propel Multan to 194, but Cadmore and Imam-ul-Haq, who scored 48, gave Zalmi a 6 wicket win. In game six, Sharjeel Khan's 105 was not enough as Islamabad successfully chased down 197 to beat Karachi by 5 wickets. The next day, Multan got their first win of the season. Their captain Mohammad Rizwan led from the front scoring 76 to give Multan a 7 wicket win. On the same day, Peshawar chased down over 190 for the second time in a row to beat Quetta by 3 wickets.

==== Week 2 ====
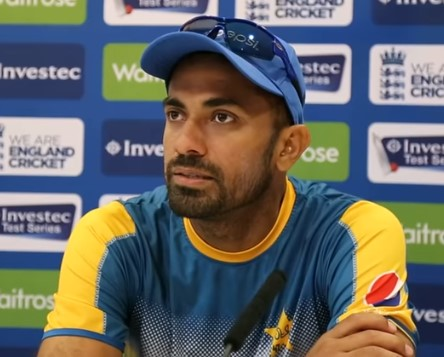
Wahab Riaz (pictured in 2017) took 4/17 against Islamabad.

Babar Azam excelled in game nine, leading Karachi to a 7 wicket win over Multan. On the same day, Wahab Riaz took 4/17 to lead Peshawar to a 6 wicket win over Islamabad. In game 11, Lahore beat Karachi by 6 wickets despite Sharjeel Khan scoring 64. Islamabad United chased down 156 with 3 overs to spare in game twelve. This was largely down to Paul Stirling, who scored a half-century in the 6 wicket win. Babar Azam's 77 helped Karachi to a 6 wicket win over Peshawar in game 13. He was helped by Mohammad Nabi, who also scored a half-century to take them back to the top of the table. The last game before the tournament was suspended featured Quetta getting their first win of the season against Multan by 22 runs. This was the first time in the competition the team batting first won.

==== Week 3 ====
The first game after the tournament resumed was between Islamabad and Lahore. James Faulkner took 3/32 on his debut to help Lahore to a 5 wicket win. Babar Azam's unbeaten 85 was in vain in game 16, as Multan beat Karachi by 12 runs. On the same day, Rashid Khan took 5 wickets in the match, as Lahore beat Peshawar by 10 runs. Islamabad's openers recorded the highest ever powerplay score in the PSL in game 18, they scored 97/0 as they helped United to a 10 wicket win over Quetta. David Miller kept Peshawar in contention for a playoff place in game 19. He scored 73 as Peshawar defeated Quetta by 61 runs. In game 20, Asif Ali counterattacked Lahore, giving Islamabad a 28 run win. Islamabad were 20–5 before Ali's innings of 75, which allowed them to post 152. Mohammad Rizwan led from the front in game 21, he scored an unbeaten 82 as Multan beat Peshawar by 8 wickets. In game 22, Colin Munro scored 88 to help Islamabad to an 8 wicket win over Karachi.

==== Week 4 ====
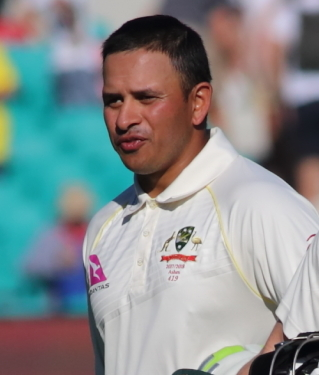
Usman Khawaja scored an unbeaten 105 in game twenty-six.

Quetta Gladiators got a rare win in game 23, as Khurram Shazad took 3 wickets in an 18 run victory against Lahore. Hazratullah Zazai scored the joint fastest half-century in game 24, after Peshawar's bowlers restricted Karachi to 108 before Zalmi chased it down with 6 wickets to spare. Quetta were eliminated in game 25 at the hands of Multan. Quetta were bowled out for 73 which gave the Sultans a 110 run win. Records were broken in game 26, as an Usman Khawaja century propelled Islamabad to 247, the highest ever PSL score. In response, Peshawar scored 236 in the highest scoring PSL game ever. On the same day, in the second Karachi-Lahore derby of the season, the Kings beat the Qalandars by 7 runs to keep their playoff hopes alive. Lahore were in action the next day in game 28 losing by 80 runs to Multan, who, as a result, qualified for the playoffs; this was largely down to Shahnawaz Dahani, who took 4/5. Karachi needed a win in game 29 to qualify for the playoffs and knock out Lahore. They did this as a result of Danish Aziz's innings of 45 off 13, which enabled them to beat Quetta by 14 runs. Both teams were through in the last game of the group stage as Islamabad beat Multan by 4 wickets.

== Playoffs ==
Semifinals
21 June — Abu Dhabi
1	Islamabad United	149 (19 Overs)
2	Multan Sultans	180/5 (20 overs)
21 June — Abu Dhabi
3	Peshawar Zalmi	176/5 (19.5 overs)
4	Karachi Kings	175/7 (20 overs)

Preliminary final
22 June — Abu Dhabi
1	Islamabad United	174/9 (20 overs)
3	Peshawar Zalmi	177/2 (16.5 overs)

Final
24 June — Abu Dhabi
2	Multan Sultans	206/4 (20 overs)
3	Peshawar Zalmi	159/9 (20 overs)

=== Qualifier ===
Match 31
21 June 2021
18:00 (D/N)
Scorecard

Multan Sultans; 180/5 (20 overs)	v	Islamabad United; 149 (19 Overs)
Sohaib Maqsood 59 (41); Shadab Khan 2/25 (4 overs)		Usman Khawaja 70 (40); Sohail Tanvir 3/17 (4 overs)

Multan Sultans won by 31 runs
Sheikh Zayed Cricket Stadium, Abu Dhabi
Umpires: Ahsan Raza (Pak) and Rashid Riaz (Pak)
Player of the match: Sohail Tanvir (Multan Sultans)

- Multan Sultans won the toss and elected to bat.

Multan won the toss in the Qualifier and chose to bat. Sohaib Maqsood top scored for the Sultans, making 59 from 41; Maqsood was well-supported by Johnson Charles, who made 41. Khushdil Shah also supported Maqsood with an unbeaten 42, as Multan finished on 180/5. The pick of the bowlers for Islamabad was Shadab Khan, who took 2/5 from 4 overs. In response for Islamabad, Usman Khawaja scored 70 off 40 as no other United batsman got past 30. Islamabad were all out for 149, giving Multan a 31 run win. For Multan, the pick of the bowlers was Sohail Tanvir, who took 3 wickets to send Multan into their first ever PSL final.

=== Eliminator ===
==== Eliminator 1 ====
Match 32
21 June 2021
23:00 (N)
Scorecard

Karachi Kings; 175/7 (20 overs)	v	Peshawar Zalmi; 176/5 (19.5 overs)
Babar Azam 53 (45); Mohammad Irfan 2/21 (4 overs)		Hazratullah Zazai 77 (38); Thisara Perera 2/10 (2 overs)

Peshawar Zalmi won by 5 wickets
Sheikh Zayed Cricket Stadium, Abu Dhabi
Umpires: Aleem Dar (Pak) and Shozab Raza (Pak)
Player of the match: Hazratullah Zazai (Peshawar Zalmi)

- Peshawar Zalmi won the toss and elected to field.

Peshawar won the toss in Eliminator 1 and chose to field. Karachi got off to a good start with Babar Azam making 53 before being dismissed. In the middle order Danish Aziz, Chadwick Walton and Imad Wasim came and went for Karachi, with none of them scoring more than 20. One player who did get going in the middle order was Thisara Perera; he scored 37 off 18 to take the Kings to 175/7 from their 20 overs. The pick of the bowlers for Peshawar was Mohammad Irfan, who took 2/21 from his 4 overs. In response for the Zalmi, Hazratullah Zazai, scored 77 off 38 to anchor Peshawar's chase. While at 4 was Shoaib Malik, who scored 30 to further reduce the target for Peshawar. In the end, after a final over, which contained two dropped catches, Sherfane Rutherford's 17 helped to give Peshawar a 5 wicket win. For Karachi, the pick of the bowlers was Thisara Perera, who took 2/10 from his 2 overs. The result meant Peshawar were through to the second Eliminator, where they would face Islamabad United.

==== Eliminator 2 ====
Match 33
22 June 2021
21:00 (N)
Scorecard

Islamabad United; 174/9 (20 overs)	v	Peshawar Zalmi; 177/2 (16.5 overs)
Hasan Ali 45 (16); Wahab Riaz 2/35 (4 overs)		Hazratullah Zazai 66 (44); Mohammad Wasim 1/32 (3 overs)

Peshawar Zalmi won by 8 wickets
Sheikh Zayed Cricket Stadium, Abu Dhabi
Umpires: Aleem Dar (Pak) and Asif Yaqoob (Pak)
Player of the match: Hazratullah Zazai (Peshawar Zalmi)

- Peshawar Zalmi won the toss and elected to field.

Peshawar won the toss and chose to field in Eliminator 2. Opening for United was Colin Munro, who made 44. With Islamabad 110-8 it looked like they would be all out, however a cameo from Hasan Ali who scored 45 off 16 propelled them to 174. He was well supported by Mohammad Wasim who made an unbeaten 17. For much of Islamabad's innings, Peshawar were fielding with 10 fielders after Mohammad Irfan went off injured and was not allowed a replacement. The pick of the bowlers for the Zalmi was Wahab Riaz, who took 2/35. In Peshawar's response, Hazratullah Zazai, who scored 66 off 44, and Jonathan Wells, who scored 55 off 43, anchored Peshawar's innings bringing them closer to the target. Shoaib Malik applied the finishing touches for the Zalmi, scoring 32 off 10 as Peshawar wrapped up an 8 wicket win. For Islamabad the pick of the bowlers was Mohammad Wasim, who took 1/32 from his 3 overs. The result meant Peshawar were through to the final, their fourth overall.

=== Final ===
Match 34
24 June 2021
21:00 (N)
Scorecard

Multan Sultans; 206/4 (20 overs)	v	Peshawar Zalmi; 159/9 (20 overs)
Sohaib Maqsood 65* (35); Sameen Gul 2/26 (4 overs)		Shoaib Malik 48 (28); Imran Tahir 3/33 (4 overs)

Multan Sultans won by 47 runs
Sheikh Zayed Cricket Stadium, Abu Dhabi
Umpires: Aleem Dar (Pak) and Ahsan Raza (Pak)
Player of the match: Sohaib Maqsood (Multan Sultans)

- Peshawar Zalmi won the toss and elected to field.

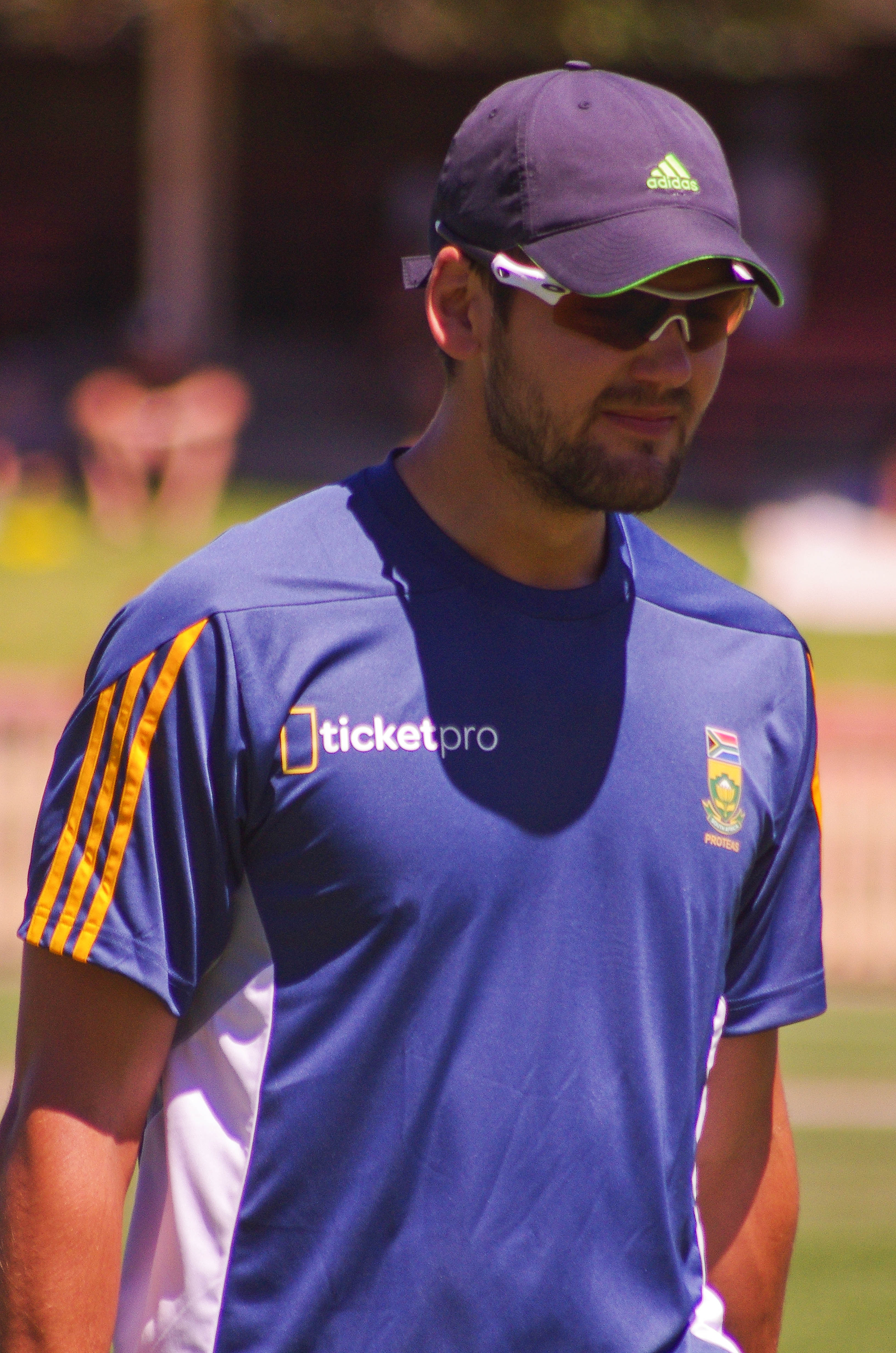
Rilee Rossouw (pictured in 2014) hit a 50 to get Multan past 200.

Peshawar won the toss and chose to bowl in the final. Shan Masood and Mohammad Rizwan opened the innings for the Sultans. Shan was dismissed first for 37 by Mohammad Imran. At the other end, Multan's captain, Mohammad Rizwan, was caught behind for 30 as Mohammad Imran claimed a second wicket. Afterwards, came Sohaib Maqsood, who made an unbeaten 65. This later won Maqsood the player of the match award. Rilee Rossouw followed Maqsood and made 50 in 20 balls, before he top edged a ramp to Mohammad Irfan as Sameen Gul claimed his first wicket of the match. The third wicket partnership between Maqsood and Rossouw was worth 98. Things got better for Sameen as he got out Johnson Charles Leg before wicket (LBW) for a golden duck. While at six was Khushdil Shah, who scored an unbeaten 15 off 5 balls to increase Multan's score. In the end, Multan finished on 206/4; the pick of the bowlers for Peshawar was Sameen Gul, who finished with figures of 2/26. In response, Hazratullah Zazai was first to score 6 for Peshawar before being caught at point by Shan Masood. Zazai was soon followed by Kamran Akmal, as he was bowled by Imran Khan for 36. Jonathan Wells was next, and he was run out for 6. Some stability was provided by Shoaib Malik and Rovman Powell, when Powell was caught behind for 23, Peshawar were 124/4. Malik was then caught out for 48 off 28 by Imran Tahir. Tahir then took a wicket himself as Sherfane Rutherford was dismissed for 18. Afterwards, Tahir claimed two more wickets as both Wahab Riaz and Mohammed Imran were bowled by him for golden ducks. Next to go was Amad Butt, as he was caught by Mohammad Rizwan for 7. In the end, Peshawar finished on 159/9, which resulted in a 47 run victory for Multan, making them the champions of PSL 6.

== Awards and statistics ==
The player of the tournament was Sohaib Maqsood of Multan Sultans. His captain, Mohammad Rizwan, won the Imtiaz Ahmed award for the best wicket-keeper, while Iftikhar Ahmed won the award for the best fielder. Shahnawaz Dahani of Multan took 20 wickets at an average of 17.00 to be the leading wicket-taker ahead of Wahab Riaz of Peshawar Zalmi with 18 wickets and win the Fazal Mahmood award. The winner of the Hanif Mohammad award for the leading run scorer was Babar Azam who scored 554 runs.

=== Most runs ===
Player	Team	Mat	Inns	Runs	HS
Babar Azam	Karachi Kings	11	11	554	90*
Mohammad Rizwan	Multan Sultans	12	12	500	82*
Sohaib Maqsood	Multan Sultans	12	12	428	65*
Shoaib Malik	Peshawar Zalmi	13	13	354	73
Sharjeel Khan	Karachi Kings	11	11	338	105
Source: ESPNcricinfo, Last updated: 24 June 2021

- Babar Azam of Karachi Kings received the Green Cap.

=== Most wickets ===
Player	Team	Mat	Inns	Wkts	BBI
Shahnawaz Dahani	Multan Sultans	11	11	20	4/5
Wahab Riaz	Peshawar Zalmi	12	12	18	4/17
Shaheen Afridi	Lahore Qalandars	10	10	16	3/14
James Faulkner	Lahore Qalandars	6	6	13	3/19
Imran Tahir	Multan Sultans	7	7	13	3/7
Source: ESPNcricinfo, Last updated: 24 June 2021

- Shahnawaz Dahani of Multan Sultans received the Maroon Cap.
