= Ali Gul Pir =

Pakistani rapper, comedian and voice and television actor (born 1986)

Ali Gul Pir علی گل پیر
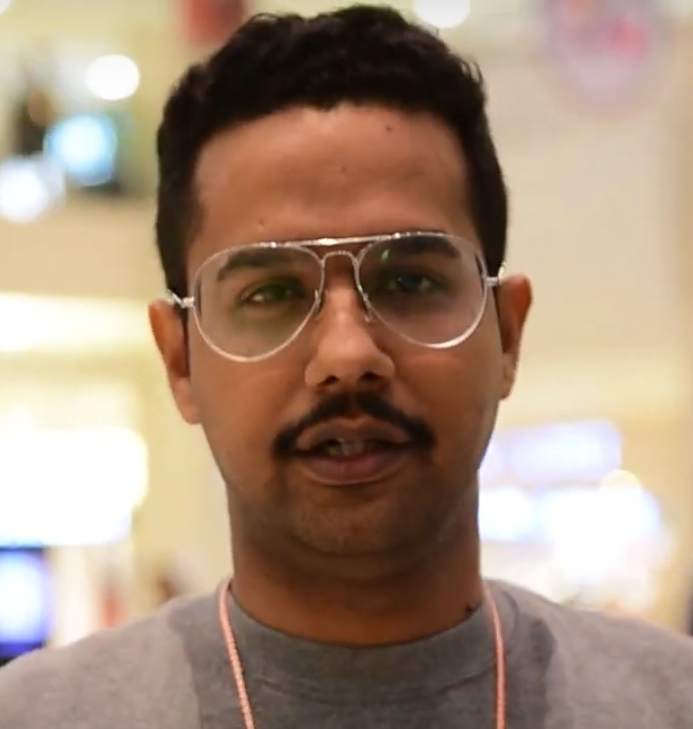
- Pir in 2018

Background information
- Born: Ali Gul Pir; 14 February 1986 (age 40); Karachi, Pakistan
- Genres: Hip hop
- Instrument: Vocals
- Years active: 2012–present
- Spouse: Dr. Azeemah Nakhoda (m.2023)
- Website: AliGulPir.com

Ali Gul Pir (Sindhi: علي گل پير Urdu: علی گل پیر; born 14 February 1986) is a Pakistani rapper, television and voice actor, brand ambassador and comedian. He achieved popularity with his first single, "Waderai Ka Beta", a comedy song about political elites in Pakistan at the helm of affairs and the culture surrounding it. He is great-grandson of Pir Ilahi Bux, the second Chief Minister of Sindh.

== Biography ==
Pir was born to a Sindhi feudal family of Dadu District.

Pir started his career as an actor in stand-up comedies, later turning into a singer. His political and social debut single Waderai Ka Beta was popular, with half a million hits on YouTube within a week of its release in June 2012.

He was nominated for the Best Newcomer in Music category at 1st Hum Awards on 12 March 2013.

== Discography ==
- "Waderai Ka Beta" (2012)
- Saeen To Saeen (2012)
- Taroo Maroo (2013)
- VIP (2013)
- Kholo BC with Adil Omar (2014)
- Justice (2014)
- Kaisa Diya? (2014)
- Dance the Party with Shuja Haider for Jawani Phir Nahi Ani (2015)
- Chutti Time (2016)
- Modi Teri (2016)
- Kerlay Jo Kerna Hai (2020)

=== TV commercials ===
- Djuice
- Hardee's
- Yayvo TCS
- Olpers Lassi
- Ufone
- Total Hi-Perf

== Filmography ==
- 3 Bahadur: The Revenge of Baba Balaam (2016)

== Controversy ==
In 2019, the rapper reportedly mocked Ali Zafar on social media, and released a song "Karley Jo Karna Hai". However, since Zafar was involved in a legal battle with Meesha Shafi, he launched a cybercrime case as well, where the Federal Investigation Agency also booked the rapper.
