= Keamari District =

Administrative district of Karachi, Sindh, Pakistan

Keamari District ضلع کیماڑی
- District of Sindh
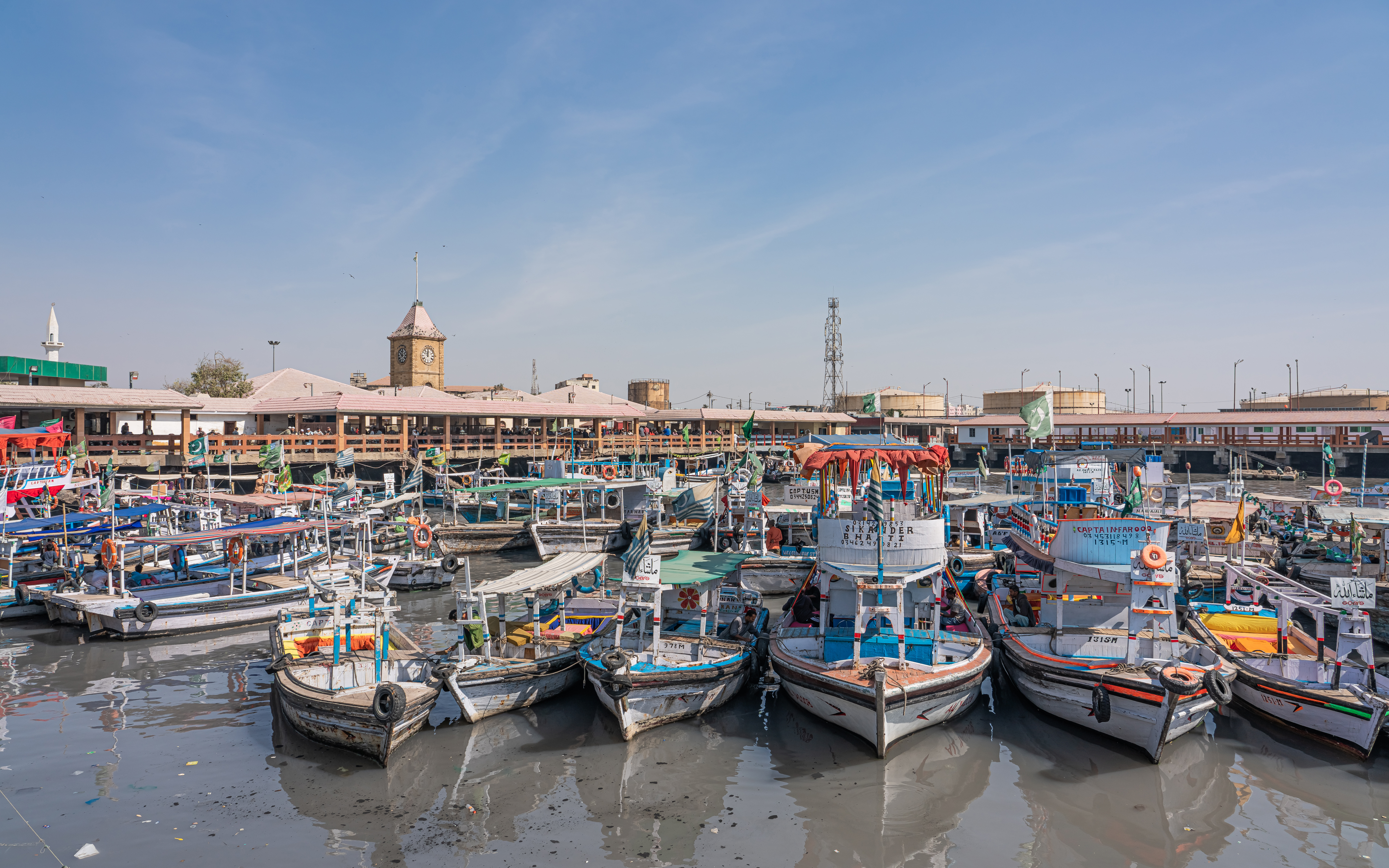
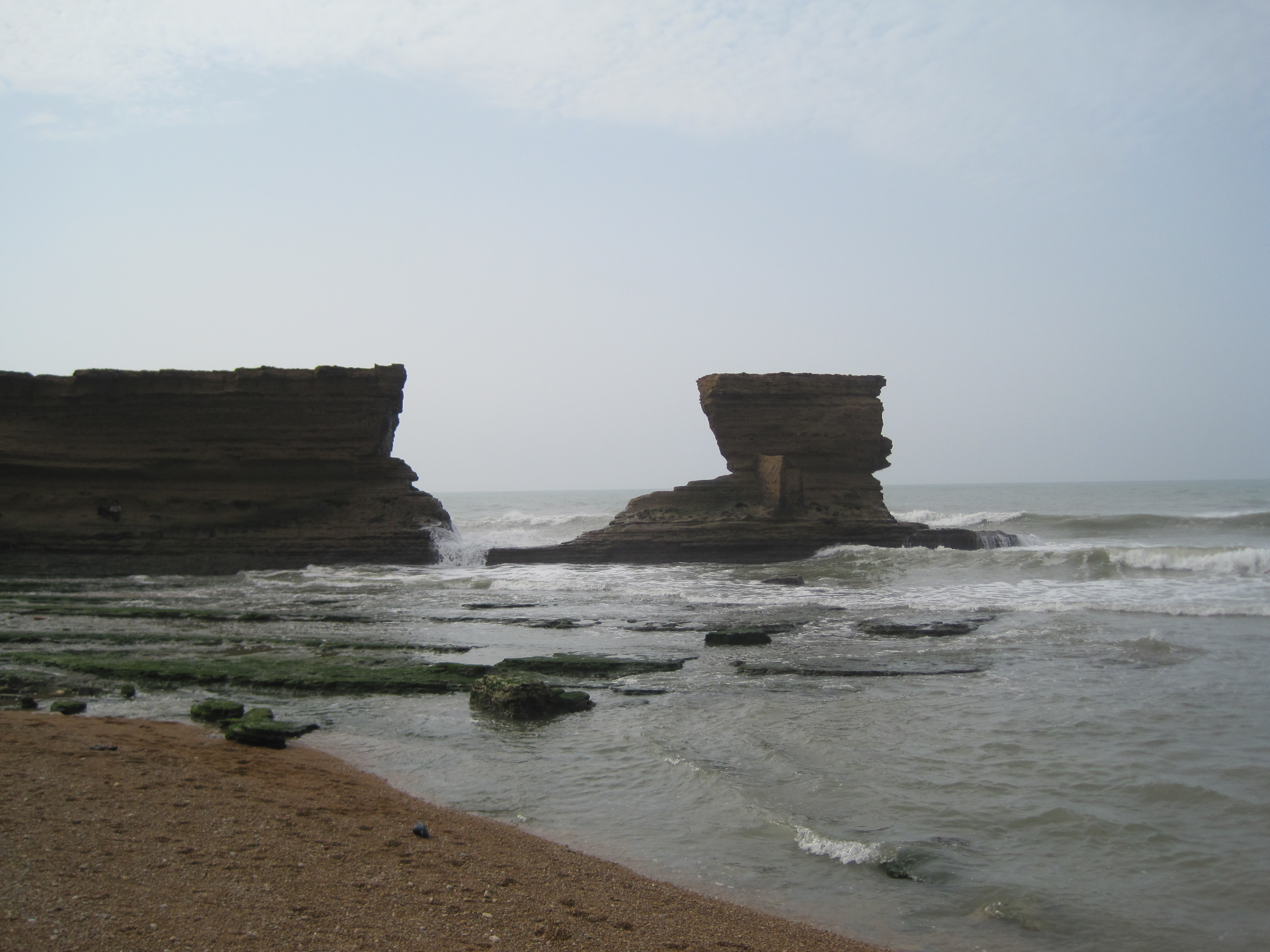
- Top: Keamari Boat Terminal; Bottom: Paradise Point
- Etymology: District Karachi West
- Country: Pakistan
- Province: Sindh
- Division: Karachi
- Preceded: District Karachi West (1972-2020)
- Headquarters: Baldia Town
- Established: 2020; 6 years ago
- Administration: DMC Keamari office
- Administrative Subdivisions: 04: Baldia Town Keamari Town Mauripur Town SITE Town

Government
  - Type: District Administration
  - Body: Deputy Commissioner
  - Deputy Commissioner: Junaid Iqbal Khan (MQM-P)
  - Administrator: Iqbal Ahmed Mirani (MQM-P)
  - Constituensy: NA-242 Karachi Keamari-I; NA-243 Karachi Keamari-II

Area
  - Total: 559 km^{2} (216 sq mi)
- Elevation: 51 m (167 ft)

Population (2023)
  - Total: 2,066,574
  - Density: 3,700.3/km^{2} (9,584/sq mi)

Literacy
  - Literacy rate: Total: 62.07%; Male: 66.86%; Female: 56.51%
- Time zone: UTC+05:00 (PKT)
  - Summer (DST): DST is not observed
- ZIP Code: 75700
- NWD (area) code: 021
- ISO 3166 code: PK-SD

Keamari District (Urdu: ضلع کیماڑی) is an administrative district of Karachi Division in Sindh, Pakistan.

== Town Municipal Committee ==
As per the Sindh Local Government Act, 2021, Sindh government replaced the previous seven District Municipal Corporations (DMCs) with 26 towns, each with its own municipal committee. Keamari District has three towns.

- Baldia Town
- Mauripur Town
- Moriro Mirbahar Town

== History ==
Keamari District was created on 21 August 2020 after it was carved out of District West Karachi. Baldia Town, SITE Town, Mauripur Town and Keamari Town ended up being part of the newly created Keamari District. The 2023 Pakistani census recorded Keamari District's population as 2,066,574 (2 million). Keamari District was created after splitting Karachi West District in 2020.

== Demographics ==
Historical population
Year	Pop.	±% p.a.
1951	_	—
1961	_	—
1972	_	—
1981	_	—
1998	_	—
2017	1,829,837	—
2023	2,066,574	+2.05%

As of the 2023 census, Keamari district has 319,121 households and a population of 2,068,451. The district has a sex ratio of 113.75 males to 100 females and a literacy rate of 62.07%: 66.86% for males and 56.51% for females. 545,382 (26.39% of the surveyed population) are under 10 years of age. The entire population lives in urban areas.

=== Religion ===
Religions in Keamari district (2023)
Religion	Percent
Islam	98.15%
Christianity	1.27%
Hinduism	0.49%
Other or not stated	0.09%

The majority religion is Islam, with 98.15% of the population. Christianity is practiced by 1.27% and Hinduism by 0.49% of the population.

=== Languages ===
Languages of Keamari district (2023)
1. Pashto (33.1%)
2. Urdu (22.1%)
3. Punjabi (10.8%)
4. Sindhi (9.30%)
5. Hindko (7.75%)
6. Balochi (7.10%)
7. Saraiki (2.73%)
8. Others (7.12%)

At the time of the 2023 census, 684,923 of the population spoke Pashto, 455,771 Urdu, 223,919 Punjabi, 192,220 Sindhi, 160,190 Hindko, 146,835 Balochi, 56,474 Saraiki and 147,242 others, of total 2,066,574 as their first language.

== Administration ==
Keamari district is divided into four subdivisions: Keamari (also called Harbour), Baldia, Mauripur, and SITE.

Following is the list of four administrative sub-divisions (Tehsil) of Keamari District.

- Keamari (population 451,147)
- Baldia (population 948,399)
- Site (population 449,098)
- Mauripur (population 217,930)

== List of the Towns with UC's ==
#	District	Union Council	Map
1	Keamari Town	U.C. 1 Bhutta Village; U.C. 2 Sikanderabad + Sultanabad; U.C. 3 Kiamari; U.C. 4 Baba Bhit; U.C. 5 Machar Colony; U.C. 6 Maripur; U.C. 7 SherShah; U.C. 8 Gabo Pat	
2	Baldia Town	U.C. 1 Gulshan-e-Ghazi; U.C. 2 Ittehad Town; U.C. 3 Islam Nagar; U.C. 4 Nai Abadi; U.C. 5 Saeedabad; U.C. 6 Muslim Mujahid Colony; U.C. 7 Muhajir Camp; U.C. 8 Rasheedabad	
3	S.I.T.E. Town	U.C. 1 Pak Colony; U.C. 2 Old Golimar; U.C. 3 Jahanabad; U.C. 4 Metrovil; U.C. 5 Bhawani Chali; U.C. 6 Frontier Colony; U.C. 7 Banaras Colony; U.C. 8 Qasba Colony; U.C. 9 Islamia Colony	

== See also ==
- Divisions of Pakistan
  - Divisions of Balochistan
  - Divisions of Khyber Pakhtunkhwa
  - Divisions of Punjab
  - Divisions of Sindh
  - Divisions of Azad Kashmir
  - Divisions of Gilgit-Baltistan
- Tehsils of Pakistan
  - Tehsils of Punjab, Pakistan
  - Tehsils of Khyber Pakhtunkhwa, Pakistan
  - Tehsils of Balochistan, Pakistan
  - Tehsils of Sindh, Pakistan
  - Tehsils of Azad Kashmir
  - Tehsils of Gilgit-Baltistan
- Districts of Pakistan
  - Districts of Khyber Pakhtunkhwa, Pakistan
  - Districts of Punjab, Pakistan
  - Districts of Balochistan, Pakistan
  - Districts of Sindh, Pakistan
  - Districts of Azad Kashmir
  - Districts of Gilgit-Baltistan
- Keamari Town
- Keamari (locality)
- Keamari Sub-Division
