= Sindh Industrial Trading Estate =

Industrial park in Karachi, Pakistan

SITE سائٹ
- Municipality
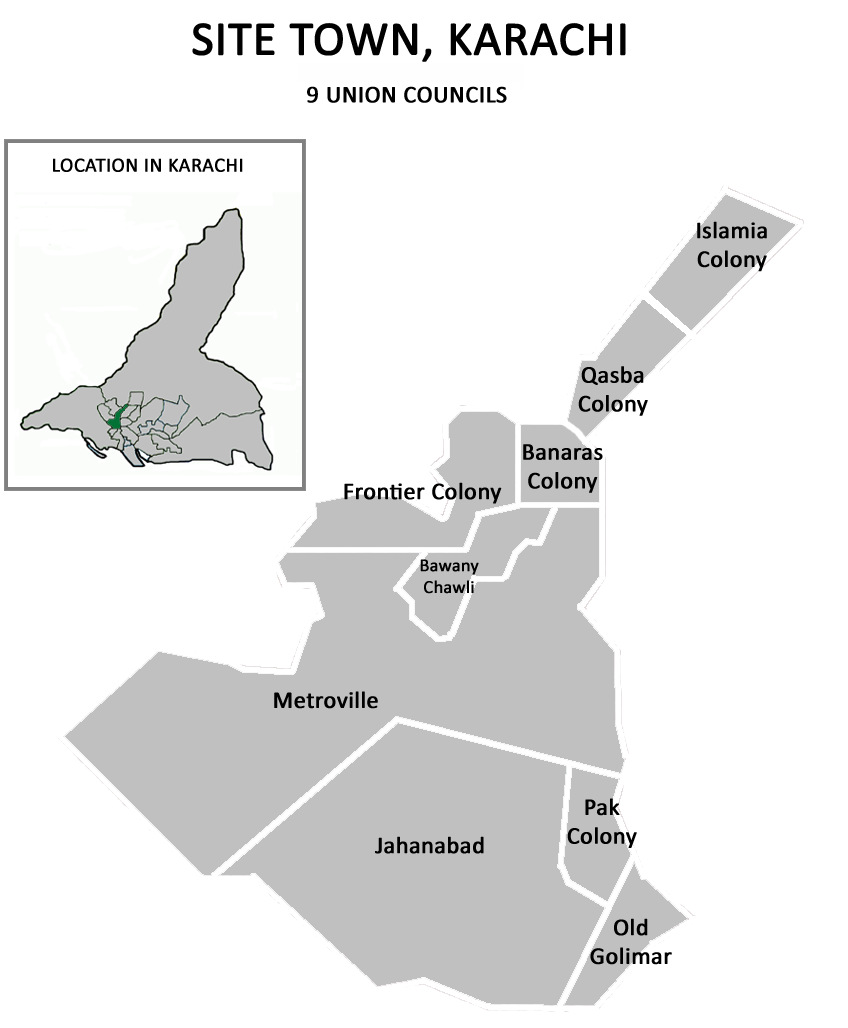
- Union councils of SITE Town, Karachi
- Country: Pakistan
- Province: Sindh
- City District: Karachi
- Established: 1963
- Union Councils: 9: Pak Colony; Old Golimar; Jahanabad; Metrovil; Bhawani Chali; Frontier Colony; Banaras Colony; Qasba Colony; Islamia Colony

Government
  - Constituency: NA-250 (Karachi West-III)
  - National Assembly Member: Attaullah Advocate (PTI)

Population (1998)
  - Total: 467,560

Sindh Industrial Trading Estate (SITE) is located in Karachi, Sindh, Pakistan. Designated as an industrial area in 1963, S.I.T.E is the oldest and the largest designated industrial area of Pakistan, encompassing 9,700 acres (19 km^{2}) of land. It contains approximately 2,400 factories.

== History ==
In order to promote industrialization and create attractive conditions for industrialists, the government of Sindh established Sindh Industrial Trading Estates, in the year 1947. The object was to establish planned industrial areas where industrialists, in the future, could have all their required and needed facilities such as land, road, railway, water supply, electricity, gas, telephone, godowns (warehouses), sanitation, drainage, residential areas for workers and other necessary public amenities. These facilities were designed to create an industrial environment congenial for intending future industrialists. It has grown into the largest industrial area in Pakistan with more than 1,900 industrial units on 4,460 acres (18.0 km^{2}) of land west of the Lyari River. The estate benefits from the proximity of the Port of Karachi and various roads linking to the rest of Pakistan. The town grew up as worker colonies were established around the industrial estate.

The father of nation Quaid-e-Azam Muhammad Ali Jinnah came here in July 1948 and attended the opening ceremony of Valika Textile Mills, the first textile mill of Pakistan. Moreover, the Valika family also established many hospitals and schools, the most notable being Valika Hospital. Soon after, under the leadership of Fakhruddin Valika, the Valikas grew and established their empire of industries which continued to flourish during the Ayub era.

== Organizational structure ==
S.I.T.E established by virtue of policy decision through Sindh Government No.24-I.B/47.1, dated June 2, 1947. SITE is the Government department under Ministry of Commerce and Industry, Government of Sindh in Pakistan. The Company works through Board of Directors appointed by Government of Sindh and is accountable to the provincial government for its performance. It is also a non-profit organization of Pakistan.

There are a total of 10 industrial estates, each one of them called SITE, located in Karachi, Sindh and in other major cities of the province. Sindh Industrial and Trading Estate zone is providing employment to more than 1/2 million people. The objective and aim is to boost the industrialization in the province of Sindh.Companies located within SITE area

- Valika Textile Mills was the first to locate here in 1947 and the founder of Pakistan Muhammad Ali Jinnah was asked to lay the foundation stone of it.
- One of the international companies, for example, located at SITE Karachi is Exide Pakistan Limited which manufactures and markets automotive batteries.
- Many other companies located here represent business sectors such as food products, chemicals, heavy and light engineering workshops, plastic, rubber, leather products, repair and maintenance of motor vehicles and their assembly, woodworking, glass products and storage warehouses.

== Facilities ==
=== Industries ===
- Abbas Brothers Compressed Air Solutions
- Atlas Honda
- National Foods Limited
- GlaxoSmithKline Pakistan
- Pakistan Cables
- Pakistan Beverage Limited
- Habib Oil Mills

=== Educational institutions ===
- ITEC Public School, Metroville
- Apex Grammar School, Elahi Colony, S.I.T.E Town
- Baldia Government Secondary School (KMC), (Pathan Colony)
- Pak Falcon Academy School, (Old Golimar)
- Rose Garden Secondary School, (Islamia Colony)
- Rose Garden Elementary School, (Islamia Colony)
- Generations School
- Generations University
- Naz Public Secondary School, (Islamia Colony No:1)
- Al-Habib Public School, (Qasba Colony)
- Mohammad Hamid Badayoni College
- Metrovil Girls College
- Teacher Training College
- Karachi Polytechnique College
- Lee Rosary Secondary Public School
- Hashmi Public Secondary School, (Pathan Colony)
- Fida Muhammad College
- Javed College
- Sindh Government College for Technology (GCT)
- Mumtaz Montessori
- The Educators
- Noor-ul-Huda Secondary Public School
- Standard High School
- New Vision Grammar Secondary School, (Frontier Colony No1 Keekar Ground)
- The Perfect Paradise Secondary School, (Bukhari Colony, Banaras Colony)
- The Rising Star Grammar Secondary School, (Metroville)
- Young Scholar Grammar Secondary School, (Maxico Ground )
- Pearl Public Grammar Secondary School, (Sabri Baba Frontier Colony Karachi)
- Global Choice Grammar Secondary School, (Elahi Colony near Metro Cinema)
- Al Nasir Public School, (Pathan Colony)
- Knowledge Foundation, (Bawani Chali)
- Students Foundation, (Bawani Chali)
- Habib Public School, (Pathan Colony)
- Hamqadam Model School
- Iqra islamia Cadet School
- The Language Masters, (Metroville Block-01)
- Islamia Public Secondary School, (Block 5 Metroville)
- Wisdom House Public Secondary School, (Block 2 Metroville)
- Al-fatah Primary & Secondary School, (Metroville).

=== Hospitals ===
- Faiz Rehman Hospital
- Valika Hospital
- 7 Dispensaries
- 1 Maternity Home
- Metro Lions Hospital
- Aga Khan Community Clinic
- Khyber neuro brain and spine Clinic
- Salam Clinic

=== Parks ===
- Trans Lyari Park (Guttar Bhagicha)
- Model Park Metrovil sahil
- National Modren Park

=== Graveyards ===
- Mewahshah Graveyard
- Shahenshah Ghat
- Metrovill Graveyard
- Tower of Silence
- Muhammad Pur Graveyard, Qasba Colony

The Mewa Shah Graveyard is the oldest graveyard of the city existing since the 16th century. Inside the Graveyard, famous Khanqah of prominent saint of Pakistan Baba Zaheen Shah Taji is also there.

=== Mosques and Madaris ===
- Jamia Binoria
- Khulfa-e-Rashideen (Old Golimar)
- Jamia Ashrafia (Imdadia)
- 250 Mosques
- 8 Imambargahs
- 21 Churches
- 1 Mandir
- Masjid Quba, Block 5, Metroville 1
- Jamaa` Masjid, Bilal Islamia Colony #2
- Madrasa Siddiqia Taleem Ul Quran Lil-Banat (Girls), Islamia Colony # 2
- Rehmani Masjid, (Pathan Colony)
- Makkah Masjid, (Pathan Colony)
- Al-fatah Primary & Secondary School, (Metroville).

=== Markets ===
- Shershah Kabari Bazar
- Bismillah Hotel Market, (Old Golimar)
- Lunda Bazar, (Banaras Chowk)
- Makro Market,(Valika Chowrangi)
- Aligarh Bazar

=== Police stations ===
- Pak Colony Police Station, (Old Golimar)
- S.I.T.E.(A) Police Station
- S.I.T.E.(B) Police Station
- Pirabad Police Station

== See also ==
Karachi's industrial parks:

- SITE Town
- Bin Qasim Industrial Zone
- Federal B Industrial Area
- Karachi Export Processing Zone
- Korangi Creek Industrial Park
- Korangi Industrial Area
- North Karachi Industrial Area
- Pakistan Textile City
- West Wharf Industrial Area
- Nooriabad
