= Orangi =

Residential town within the city of Karachi, Pakistan

Coordinates: 24°57′N 66°58′E

Orangi اورنگی
- Constituent Town of Karachi
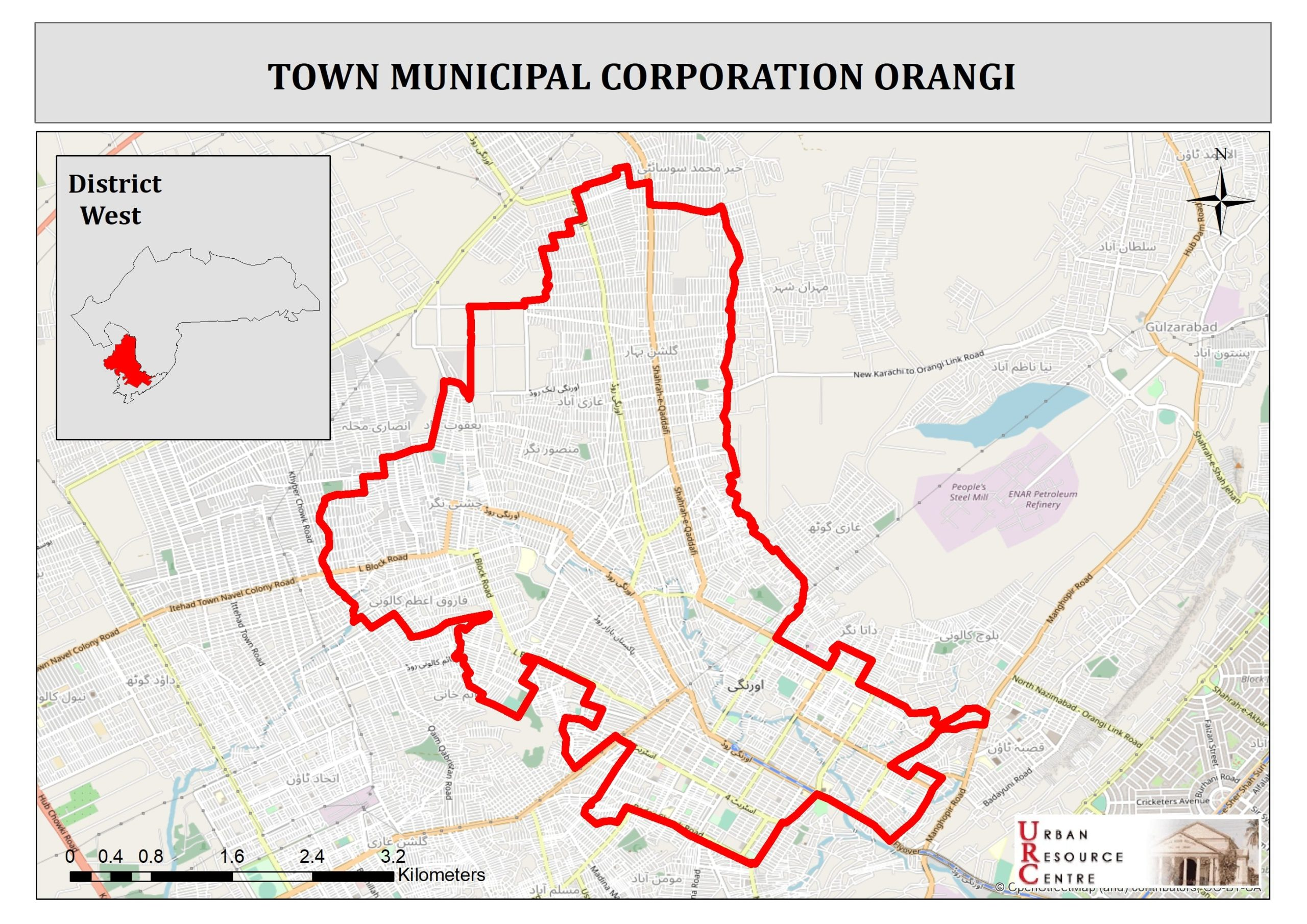
- TMC Map
- City: Karachi
- Province: Sindh
- Country: Pakistan
- Established: 1965; 61 years ago
- Town status: 2001; 25 years ago
- Union Committees in Town Municipal Corporation: 08: Gulshan-e-Zia Benazir Colony Muslim Nagar Colony Jinnah Colony Iqbal Baloch Colony Naeem Shah Bukhari Colony Shah Waliullah Nagar Data Nagar

Government
  - Type: Government of Karachi
  - Constituency: NA-245 Karachi West-II; NA-246 Karachi West-III

Area
  - Total: 9 km^{2} (3.5 sq mi)
- Elevation: 58 m (190 ft)
- Highest elevation: 123 m (404 ft)
- Lowest elevation: 28 m (92 ft)

Population (2023 Pakistani census)
  - Total: 596,919
- Time zone: UTC+05:00 (PKT)
  - Summer (DST): DST is not observed
- ZIP Code: 75800
- NWD (area) code: 021
- ISO 3166 code: PK-SD

Orangi (Urdu: اورنگی) is a town in the western part of Karachi, Pakistan, with a population of 596,919 as of the 2023 census. Orangi was developed as a planned settlement in 1972 by the Karachi Development Authority (KDA) to provide affordable housing for lower-income households. The town consists of 13 union councils.

Orangi Town is equipped with essential infrastructure, including roads, schools, colleges, playgrounds. The Orangi Pilot Project created drainage systems and sewage pipes in over 90% of Orangi Town's streets and lanes. Water and gas pipelines are also present; however, the area frequently experiences shortages of both due to supply scarcity.

It is often confused with Karachi's District West, also referred to as Orangi District, which includes several other areas of western Karachi, and has a total population of around 2.6 million.

== History ==
=== 1950 era ===
Following the Partition of India and creation of the Islamic Republic of Pakistan, a separate country for Muslims of India in 1947, a large influx of Muslim refugees from India began moving into Karachi. The Pakistani government began granting permission for refugees to settle on vacant land by 1950.

=== 1960 era ===
Orangi was established as a township in this context by 1965. Orangi Township was originally planned over 1,300 acres (530 ha) by the Karachi Development Authority, and many of Karachi's squatter settlements were relocated here. The township was planned and developed with informal assistance from the city's municipal administration.

=== 1970 era ===
Its population rapidly increased in late 1971 during and after Bangladeshi Liberation War following the arrival of thousands of refugees Biharis fleeing from the newly independent state of Bangladesh (formerly East Pakistan., and the government began to regard it as a quasi-permanent settlement. However, due to its status as an unofficial and unplanned settlement, Orangi did not qualify for government aid or community assistance, and the area's sanitation was extremely poor. Unofficial administrators emerged and became members and leaders of local political parties.

=== 1980 era ===
In the 1980s, as local inhabitants became frustrated at the lack of assistance from the municipal administration, the Orangi Pilot Project was launched under the guidance of Akhtar Hameed Khan, in which the local community financed, designed and built their own low-cost sewerage system. As a result of the sense of ownership, the community maintained the sewerage system and streets itself. Piped water was only introduced to the settlement in 1984, though the Karachi Water and Sewerage Board eventually began providing water supply to the settlement.

Until the early 1980s, most of Orangi's population was Muhajir or Punjabi. The town's demography began to shift in the 1980s as Pashtuns began arriving in the city in large numbers. In 1985, Karachi's ethnic divisions reached Orangi, as Muhajir and Pashtun groups fought over the area near Benaras Chowk and Metro Cinema. In December 1986, Pashtun gunmen attacked the Aligarh Colony, which was home to a vulnerable population of Biharis who had recently been repatriated from Bangladesh.

=== 1990 era ===
The municipality was described in a 1999 National Geographic article on Mumbai's Dharavi slum as the "largest shanty town in Asia." Orangi is in fact a lower-class settlement with basic amenities of life available to most of the people. Only some parts of Orangi Town can be characterised as a slum. At 57 square kilometres (22 sq mi) in size, it is "significantly less dense than most urban slums and also more structured". Ninety per cent of Orangi's streets are connected to sewage services. Ninety-six per cent of homes in Orangi have their own private latrine or toilet. Most homes in Orangi feature two or three rooms.

=== 2000 era ===
In 2001, Orangi was formally organised and established as a proper part of the city of Karachi and granted its own town council. By 2004, over 90% of households in Orangi were connected to the city's electric grid, although up to 20% of connections were illegal.

=== 2010 era ===
In 2011 the City District Government Karachi was disbanded but remained in place for bureaucratic administration until 2015, when the Karachi Metropolitan Corporation system was reintroduced. In 2015, Orangi Town was re-organised as part of Karachi District West.

== Geography ==
Orangi is bordered by New Karachi to the north across the Shahrah-e-Zahid Hussain, Gulberg Town to the east across the Gujjar Nala stream, Liaquatabad Town to the south, and Sindh Industrial and Trading Estate to the west. There are 13 official neighbourhoods, each with its own council, which has allowed the township to build its own sewer system.

Orangi stretches out from the Khasba Hills, North Nazimabad and Paposh Nagar towards the northern parts of Karachi and covers approximately 57 square kilometres (22 sq mi) of land. The Khasba Hills forms a natural boundary between Orangi Town and North Nazimabad. The defunct City District Government constructed a road through the Khasba Hills connecting Orangi with North Nazimabad.

== Demography ==
Orangi's population alone is estimated to be over one million. When combined with neighbouring Baldia, the population is over two million. Twenty-five per cent of Orangi's population is Pashtuns, and another 50% Muhajir. A significant population of Muhajirs are Biharis who migrated from East Pakistan in 1971 following the Bangladesh Liberation War. The remaining 25% is a mix of Afghans, Balochis, Bengalis, Punjabis, and Sindhis.

== Infrastructure ==
=== Transport ===
Orangi railway station.

== Orangi Pilot Project ==
A Poverty-Alleviation project, called the Orangi Pilot Project, was initiated by Akhtar Hameed Khan in 1980. The project was aimed at socioeconomic development of Orangi. The project comprises a number of programs, including a people's financed and managed low-cost sanitation program, a housing program that assisted in the construction of 93,000 houses, a basic health and family planning program, and a rural development program in the nearby villages. The OPP also helps provide education services, and as a result, the literacy rate in Orangi is higher than the rate in Karachi overall. Along with the Orangi Charitable Trust (OCT), OPP operates a program of supervised credit for small family enterprise units.

The OPP sewer pipes are financed, constructed, and maintained by the families who live on each street, though one-eighth of the cost of services is provided by the municipal government. Pipes are built under the street, with each household contributing $800 to $1000 toward construction of sewer services. "Lane managers" collect dues from households, and arbitrate disputes. The OPP model has been exported to other cities in Sindh and Punjab. OPP has also helped establish Awami tanks, which are underground water cisterns for use in a local area. Many are located under Orangi's mosques and churches.

== Localities within Orangi ==
- Baloch Goth
- Bilal Colony
- Chisti Nagar
- Raees Amrohi Colony
- Data Nagar
- Ghabool Town
- Ghaziabad
- Hanifabad
- Haryana Colony
- Iqbal Baloch Colony
- Madina Colony
- Mohammad Nagar
- Mominabad
- Mujahidabad
- Shah Khalid Colony

== See also ==
- Khasa Hills
- Orangi Nala
