= SITE Area, Karachi =

Neighbourhood in Karachi, Pakistan

Coordinates: 24°54′19″N 66°59′34″E

SITE Town سائٹ ٹاؤن
- Town of Karachi
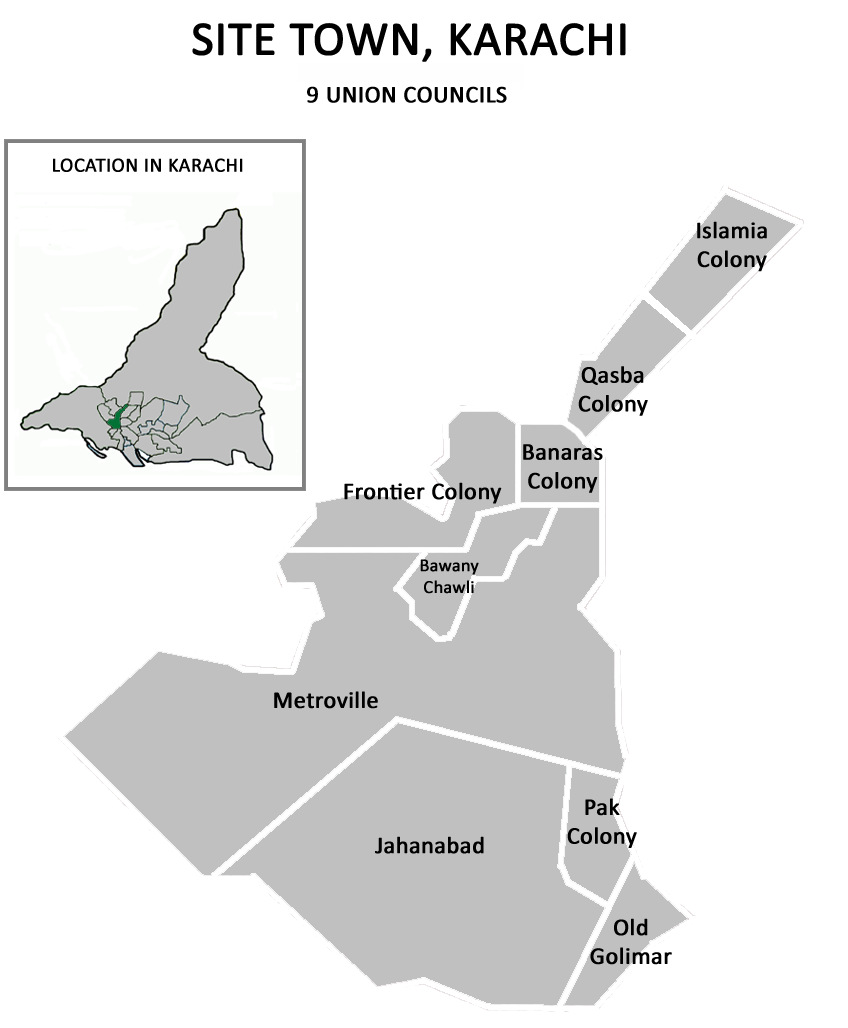
- SITE Town was divided into 9 Union Councils
- Country: Pakistan
- Province: Sindh
- City District: Karachi
- Established: 14 August 2001
- Union Councils: 9: Pak Colony; Old Golimar; Jahanabad; Metrovil; Bhawani Chali; Frontier Colony; Banaras Colony; Qasba Colony; Islamia Colony

Government
  - Type: Town Council
  - Town Administrator: Imran Aslam Khan

Population (1998)
  - Total: 467,560
- Office Location: D-1 SITE, Mangopir Road, Karachi.

SITE Town (Urdu: سائٹ ٹاؤن), located in the southern part of Karachi, Pakistan, is named after the Sindh Industrial & Trading Estate. It was established in 2001 under the Local Government Ordinance and subdivided into nine union councils. In 2011, the town system was abolished, and SITE Town became part of Karachi West District. However, following Karachi's reorganisation into 26 towns in 2022, SITE became part of Kemari District, after Kemari District was carved out of Karachi West District in 2020.

== Location ==
SITE Town was located western part of Karachi, Pakistan and was named after the Sindh Industrial and Trading Estate (SITE) area. The town was bordered by Gadap Town to the north, Liaquatabad Town and North Nazimabad Town to the east across the Orangi Nala stream, Lyari Town and Saddar Town to the south across the Lyari River and Kiamari Town to the west. Also neighbouring the town were Baldia Town and Orangi Town to the northwest.

== History ==
=== 2000 ===
The federal government introduced local government reforms in the year 2000, which eliminated the previous "third tier of government" (administrative divisions) and replaced it with the fourth tier (districts). The effect in Karachi was the dissolution of the former Karachi Division in 2001, and the merging of its five districts to form a new Karachi City-District with eighteen autonomous constituent towns including SITE Town.

=== 2011 ===
In 2011, the system was disbanded but remained in place for bureaucratic administration until 2015, when the Karachi Metropolitan Corporation system was reintroduced.

=== 2015 ===
In 2015, SITE Town was re-organized as part of Karachi West district.

== Neighborhoods ==
- Banaras Colony
- Bhawani Chali
- Chittagong Colony
- Frontier Colony
- Haroonabad
- Islamia Colony
- Jahanabad
- Golimar
- Metroville
- Old Golimar
- Tehseen Town
- Pak Colony
- Qasba Colony
- Pathan Colony
- Mastan Chali
- Qaim Khani Colony

== See also ==
- Karachi Local Government
- SITE Industrial Area
- Sindh Industrial and Trading Estate
