= NA-246 Karachi West-III =

Constituency of the National Assembly of Pakistan

- Constituency for the National Assembly of Pakistan
- Region: Mominabad Town (partly) of Karachi West District in Karachi
- Electorate: 423,861

Current constituency
- Party: MQM-P
- Member: Syed Aminul Haque
- Created from: NA-242 Karachi-IV

NA-246 Karachi West-III (این اے-246،کراچی مغربی-3) is a constituency for the National Assembly of Pakistan that encompasses Orangi.

== Areas ==
=== Mominabad sub-divisions ===
- Gulshan-e-Bahar (Sectors 4, 5, 10, 11, 12, 13, 14, 15, 16)
- Ansari Mohalla
- Azizabad Orangi
- Chishti Nagar
- Dawood Goth
- Faqeer Colony
- Fareed Colony
- German School
- Ghaziabad Orangi
- Gulshan-e-Zia
- Hanifabad
- Islam Chowk
- Johar Chowk
- Khairabad Orangi
- Mansoor Nagar
- Mominabad
- Muhajir Chowk
- Qaimkhani Colony
- Raees Amrohi Colony
- Rahim Shah Colony
- Sabri Chowk
- Yaqoob Abad

== Assembly Segments ==
| Constituency number | Constituency | District | Current MPA | Party |
|---|---|---|---|---|
| 120 | PS-120 Karachi West-V | Karachi West District | Mazahir Amir Khan | MQM-P |
| 121 | PS-121 Karachi West-VI | Karachi West District | Syed Ejaz Ul Haque | MQM-P |

== Members of Parliament ==
=== 2018–2023: NA-251 Karachi West-IV ===
| Election | Member | Party |
|---|---|---|
| 2018 | Syed Aminul Haque | MQM-P |

=== 2024–present: NA-246 Karachi West-III ===
| Election | Member | Party |
|---|---|---|
| 2024 | Syed Aminul Haque | MQM-P |

== Election 2002 ==
General elections were held on 10 October 2002. Rauf Siddiqui of Muttahida Qaumi Movement – London won by 62,690 votes.

General election 2002: NA-242 Karachi West-IV
| Party | Candidate | Votes | % | ±% |
|---|---|---|---|---|
| MQM | Rauf Siddiqui | 62,690 | 63.81 | |
| MMA | Taj Muhammad Khan | 18,299 | 18.63 | |
| PPP | Dr. Muhammad Shakir Alam | 6,593 | 6.71 | |
| PST | Abdul Hameed | 5,312 | 5.41 | |
| PMA | Abdul Ghafoor | 3,299 | 3.36 | |
| Others | Others (four candidates) | 2,050 | 2.08 | |
| Turnout | | 99,335 | 44.90 | |
| Total valid votes | | 98,243 | 98.90 | |
| Rejected ballots | | 1,092 | 1.10 | |
| Majority | | 44,391 | 45.18 | |
| Registered electors | | 221,227 | | |

== By-election 2003 ==
By-election 2003: NA-242 Karachi West-IV
| Party | Candidate | Votes | % | ±% |
|---|---|---|---|---|
| MQM | Abdul Kadir Khanzada | 67,051 | 78.41 | |
| MMA | Dr. Meraj-ul-Huda Siddiqi | 17,818 | 20.84 | |
| Others | Others (four candidates) | 645 | 0.75 | |
| Turnout | | 86,128 | 31.74 | |
| Total valid votes | | 85,514 | 99.29 | |
| Rejected ballots | | 614 | 0.71 | |
| Majority | | 49,233 | 57.57 | |
| Registered electors | | 271,364 | | |

== Election 2008 ==
General elections were held on 18 February 2008. Dr Abdul Qadir Khanzada of Muttahida Qaumi Movement won by 147,892 votes.

General election 2008: NA-242 Karachi West-IV
| Party | Candidate | Votes | % | ±% |
|---|---|---|---|---|
| MQM | Abdul Kadir Khanzada | 147,892 | 83.54 | |
| PPP | Muhammad Afaque Khan Alias Shahid | 27,294 | 15.42 | |
| Others | Others (four candidates) | 1,844 | 1.04 | |
| Turnout | | 178,842 | 60.25 | |
| Total valid votes | | 177,030 | 98.99 | |
| Rejected ballots | | 1,812 | 1.01 | |
| Majority | | 120,598 | 68.12 | |
| Registered electors | | 296,822 | | |
| MQM hold | | | | |

== Election 2013 ==
General elections were held on 11 May 2013. Mehboob Alam of Muttahida Qaumi Movement won by 166,836 votes and became the member of National Assembly.

General election 2013: NA-242 Karachi West-IV
| Party | Candidate | Votes | % | ±% |
|---|---|---|---|---|
| MQM | Mehboob Alam | 166,836 | 84.14 | |
| PTI | Akram Khan | 10,889 | 5.49 | |
| PML(N) | Najeeb Ullah Khan Niazi | 9,462 | 4.77 | |
| JI | Taj Muhammad Khan | 5,155 | 2.60 | |
| Others | Others (five candidates) | 5,946 | 3.00 | |
| Turnout | | 201,763 | 65.57 | |
| Total valid votes | | 198,288 | 98.28 | |
| Rejected ballots | | 3,475 | 1.72 | |
| Majority | | 155,947 | 78.65 | |
| Registered electors | | 307,684 | | |
| MQM hold | | | | |

== Election 2018 ==
General elections were held on 25 July 2018.

General election 2018: NA-251 Karachi West-IV
| Party | Candidate | Votes | % | ±% |
|---|---|---|---|---|
| MQM-P | Syed Aminul Haque | 56,888 | 32.62 | |
| PTI | Muhammad Aslam | 33,462 | 19.19 | |
| TLP | Muhammad Mumtaz Hussain Ansari | 30,524 | 17.50 | |
| MMA | Muhammad Laeeq Khan | 21,812 | 12.51 | |
| PPP | Muhammad Jameel Zia | 9,616 | 5.51 | |
| PML(N) | Fahad Shafiq | 8,160 | 4.68 | |
| PSP | Muhammad Nehal Malik | 5,653 | 3.24 | |
| APML | Sohail Khan | 2,730 | 1.57 | |
| AAT | Iqra Muzamil | 2,023 | 1.16 | |
| PMA | Naeemullah | 1,974 | 1.13 | |
| Others | Others (three candidates) | 1,562 | 0.89 | |
| Turnout | | 177,729 | 43.81 | |
| Total valid votes | | 174,404 | 98.13 | |
| Rejected ballots | | 3,325 | 1.87 | |
| Majority | | 23,426 | 13.43 | |
| Registered electors | | 405,652 | | |
| MQM-P^{†} hold | | Swing | N/A | |

^{†}MQM-P is considered heir apparent to MQM

== Election 2024 ==
General elections were held on 8 February 2024. Syed Aminul Haque won the election with 74,177 votes.

General election 2024: NA-246 Karachi West-III
| Party | Candidate | Votes | % | ±% |
|---|---|---|---|---|
| MQM-P | Syed Aminul Haque | 74,177 | 40.37 | ▲7.75 |
| JI | Hafiz Naeem ur Rehman | 32,011 | 17.42 | N/A |
| PTI | Malik Muhammad Arif Awan (Note: Filed nomination papers as PTI candidate but ECP allowed him to run as an Independent) | 29,159 | 15.87 | ▼3.32 |
| TLP | Muhammad Ali | 18,279 | 9.95 | ▼7.55 |
| PPP | Waseem Akhter | 7,964 | 4.33 | ▼1.18 |
| Others | Others (nineteen candidates) | 22,142 | 12.05 | |
| Turnout | | 186,479 | 44.00 | ▲0.19 |
| Total valid votes | | 183,732 | 98.53 | |
| Rejected ballots | | 2,747 | 1.47 | |
| Majority | | 42,166 | 22.95 | ▲9.52 |
| Registered electors | | 423,861 | | |
| MQM-P hold | | | | |

== See also ==
- NA-245 Karachi West-II
- NA-247 Karachi Central-I
