= Karachi Division =

Administrative division of Karachi, Sindh, Pakistan

Karachi Division: کراچی ڈویژن
- Division
- Coordinates: 24°54′21″N 67°04′50″E
- Country: Pakistan
- Province: Sindh
- Capital: Karachi
- Established: December 1960; 65 years ago
- Founder: Ayub Khan
- Districts: 07: Gulshan District Karachi District Keamari District Korangi District Malir District Nazimabad District Orangi District

Government
  - Type: Divisional Administration
  - Commissioner: Syed Hassan Naqvi (PPP)
  - Mayor Karachi: Murtaza Wahab (PPP)

Area
  - Division: 3,527 km^{2} (1,362 sq mi)

Population (2023)
  - Division: 20,382,881
  - Density: 5,779/km^{2} (14,970/sq mi)
  - Urban: 18,868,021 (92.57%)
  - Rural: 1,514,860
  - Avg. Household size: 5.9
- combined population of all districts

Literacy
  - Literacy rate: Total: (75.11%)
- National Assembly Seats (2024): Total (22): MQM-P (15); PPP (7); PTI (0); JIP (0); PMLN (0)
- Provincial Assembly Seats (2024): Total (47): MQM-P (27); PPP (12); PTI (5); IND (2); JIP (1); PMLN (0)

Karachi Division (Urdu: کراچی ڈویژن) is an administrative division shared between the Kohistan and Larr regions of the Sindh Province of Pakistan, created in December 1960. There are seven districts in Karachi Division. The CNIC code of Karachi Division is 42. According to the 2023 Pakistani census, the population of Karachi Division is 20,382,881.

== History ==
The East India Company occupied Sindh in 1843 and created Karachi District.

In December 1960, Lasbela became a separate district from Kalat division and was placed to form Karachi-Bela division.

In 1972, Lasbela district transferred back to Kalat division and Karachi district divided into three districts; East, West and South.

In 1996, two more districts Central and Malir was created in Karachi division.

The Karachi Division was abolished in 2001 and five districts of Karachi were merged in City District Karachi. The City District Karachi was divided in 18 towns and 178 union councils. Commissioner Karachi division was made DCO, City District government Karachi.

On 11 July 2011, the Sindh Government restored five districts of Karachi division.

In November 2013, a sixth district, Korangi, was formed by splitting District Karachi East.

In August 2020, the Sindh cabinet approved formation of the seventh district in Karachi – the Keamari District – by splitting District West.

In March 2024, the Sindh government renamed the four existing districts to their famous areas names.

Old names	New names
Karachi South District	Karachi District
Karachi Central District	Nazimabad District
Karachi East District	Gulshan District
Karachi West District	Orangi District

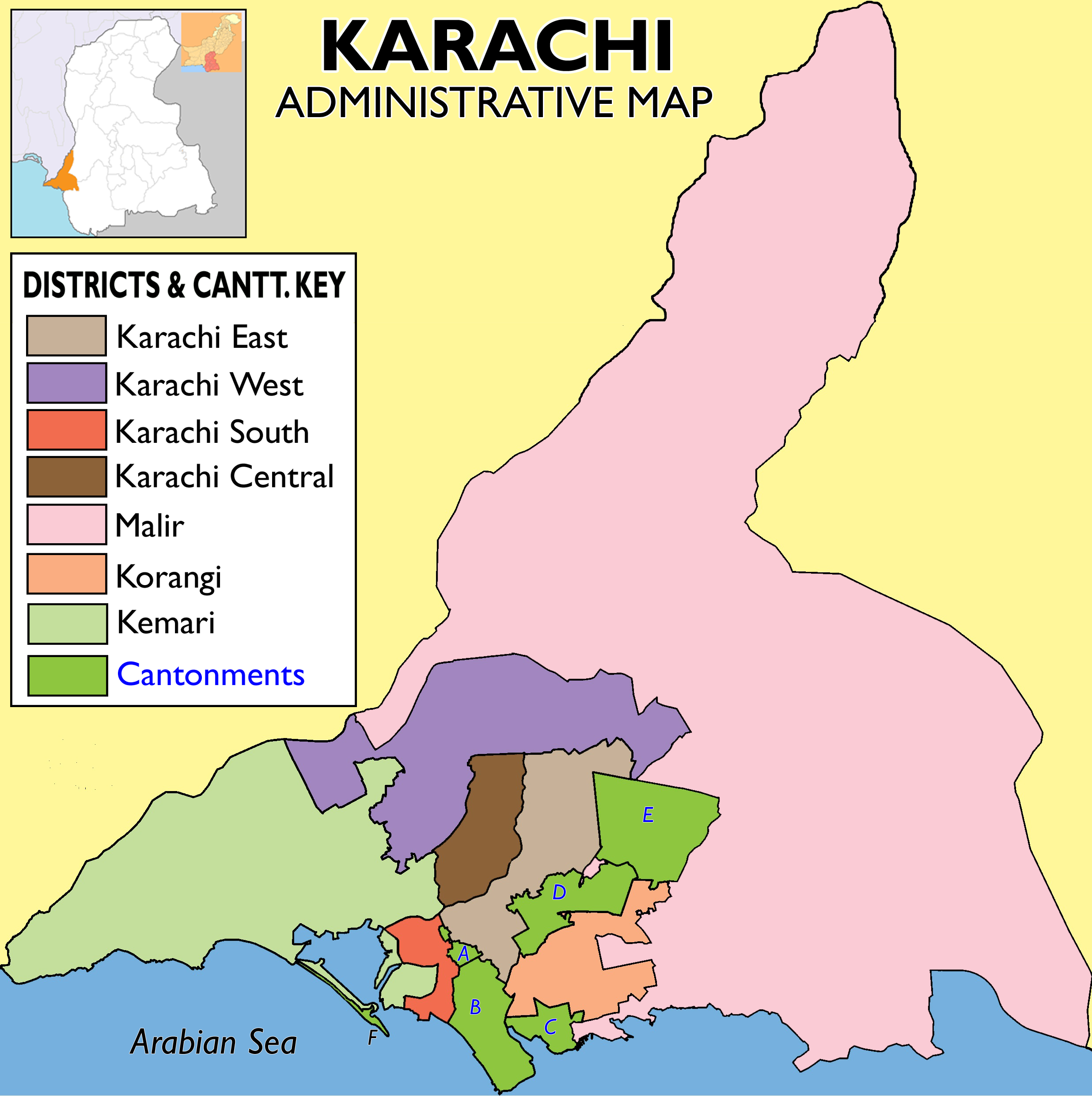
Karachi Division

== Demographics ==
Historical population
Year	Pop.	±% p.a.
1951	...	—
1961	...	—
1972	...	—
1981	5,437,984	—
1998	9,856,318	+3.56%
2017	16,051,521	+2.60%
2023	20,382,881	+4.06%

In the 2023 Pakistani census, Karachi Division had a population of 20,382,881 roughly equal to the country Sri Lanka, or the US state of Florida. It consisted of 10,787,338 males and 9,567,463 females. The literacy rate of the division was 69.11% in which female literacy rate was 71.77% and male literacy rate was 68.11%.

Languages

Languages of Karachi Division (2023 Pakistani census)
1. Urdu (50.7%)
2. Pashto (13.5%)
3. Sindhi (11.1%)
4. Punjabi (8.08%)
5. Saraiki (3.70%)
6. Balochi (3.97%)
7. Hindko (3.21%)
8. Others (5.71%)

Language	Rank	2023 census	Speakers
Urdu	1	50.67%	10,315,905
Pashto	2	13.51%	2,752,148
Sindhi	3	11.12%	2,264,189
Punjabi	4	8.08%	1,645,282
Balochi	5	3.97%	808,352
Saraiki	6	3.70%	753,903
Hindko	7	3.21%	653,727
Others	8	5.71%	1,163,968
All	9	100%	20,357,474

At the time of the 2023 Pakistani census, 10,315,905 spoke Urdu, 2,752,148 Pashto, 1,645,282 Punjabi, 2,264,189 Sindhi, 753,903 Saraiki, 808,352 Balochi, 653,727 Hindko, 50,982 Kashmiri, 75,993 Brahui, 21,860 Shina, 26,906 Balti, 30,375 Mewati, 614 Kalasha, 14,073 Koshistani, 943,165 others, as their first language of total 20,357,474.

== List of the Districts ==
#	District	Headquarter	Area (km^{2})	Pop. (2023)	Density (ppl/km^{2}) (2023)	Lit. rate (2023)
1	Gulshan	Gulshan-e-Iqbal	139	3,921,742	28,220.1	80.07%
2	Nazimabad	North Nazimabad	69	3,822,325	55,838.8	83.55%
3	Korangi	Korangi	108	3,128,971	28,968.8	79.86%
4	Orangi	Orangi Town	370	2,679,380	7,238.1	67.43%
5	Malir	Malir Town	2,160	2,432,248	1,126.8	63.14%
6	Karachi	Saddar Town	122	2,329,764	19,104.6	78.57%
7	Keamari	Moriro Mirbahar	559	2,068,451	3,699.8	62.07%

== List of the Tehsils ==
Tehsil	Area (km²)	Population (2023)	Density (ppl/km²) (2023)	Literacy rate (2023)	Districts
Lyari Town	6	949,878	158,313.00	68.40%	Karachi District
Saddar Town	35	159,363	4,553.23	88.56%	Karachi District
Aram Bagh	4	237,224	59,306.00	86.43%	Karachi District
Civil Lines	73	480,480	6,581.92	84.75%	Karachi District
Garden	4	502,819	125,704.75	84.50%	Karachi District
Gulberg Town	14	613,724	43,837.43	89.92%	Nazimabad District
Liaquatabad Town	6	547,706	91,284.33	83.69%	Nazimabad District
New Karachi Town	18	1,165,742	64,763.44	79.82%	Nazimabad District
North Nazimabad Town	23	922,413	40,104.91	83.01%	Nazimabad District
Nazimabad	8	572,740	71,592.50	84.73%	Nazimabad District
Jamshed Town	11	656,014	59,637.64	85.99%	Gulshan District
Ferozabad	20	1,167,692	58,384.60	83.02%	Gulshan District
Gulshan-e-Iqbal	29	979,502	33,775.93	89.18%	Gulshan District
Gulzar-e-Hijri	79	1,118,534	14,158.66	64.74%	Gulshan District
Korangi Town	59	1,363,992	23,118.51	70.93%	Korangi District
Landhi Town	19	681,294	35,857.58	84.60%	Korangi District
Shah Faisal Town	21	641,894	30,566.38	89.60%	Korangi District
Model Colony	9	441,791	49,087.89	86.85%	Korangi District
Orangi Town	9	596,919	66,324.33	60.76%	Orangi District
Manghopir	342	1,081,753	3,163.02	63.03	Orangi District
Mominabad	19	1,000,708	52,668.84	76.07%	Orangi District
Gadap Town	1,104	100,351	90.90	58.94%	Malir District
Bin Qasim	447	322,915	722.40	62.19%	Malir District
Airport	41	254,370	6,204.15	86.74%	Malir District
Ibrahim Hyderi	97	1,341,638	13,831.32	57.91%	Malir District
Murad Memon Goth	195	376,987	1,933.27	71.88%	Malir District
Shah Mureed	276	35,987	130.39	49.70%	Malir District
Keamari Town	50	451,801	9,036.02	55.61%	Keamari District
Baldia Town	34	948,597	27,899.91	64.25%	Keamari District
S.I.T.E. Town	25	449,120	17,964.80	68.48%	Keamari District
Mauripur	450	218,933	486.52	52.76%	Keamari District

== Constituencies ==
Provincial Assembly Constituency	National Assembly Constituency	District
PS-84 Karachi Malir-I	NA-229 Karachi Malir-I	Malir
PS-85 Karachi Malir-II	NA-229 Karachi Malir-I	Malir
PS-86 Karachi Malir-III	NA-230 Karachi Malir-II	Malir
PS-87 Karachi Malir-IV	NA-230 Karachi Malir-II	Malir
PS-88 Karachi Malir-V	NA-231 Karachi Malir-III	Malir
PS-89 Karachi Malir-VI	NA-231 Karachi Malir-III	Malir
PS-90 Karachi Korangi-I	NA-232 Karachi Korangi-I	Korangi
PS-91 Karachi Korangi-II	NA-232 Karachi Korangi-I	Korangi
PS-92 Karachi Korangi-III	NA-233 Karachi Korangi-II	Korangi
PS-93 Karachi Korangi-IV	NA-233 Karachi Korangi-II	Korangi
PS-94 Karachi Korangi-V	NA-233 Karachi Korangi-II	Korangi
PS-95 Karachi Korangi-VI	NA-234 Karachi Korangi-III	Korangi
PS-96 Karachi Korangi-VII	NA-234 Karachi Korangi-III	Korangi
PS-97 Karachi East-I	NA-235 Karachi East-I	Karachi East
PS-98 Karachi East-II	NA-235 Karachi East-I	Karachi East
PS-99 Karachi East-III	NA-236 Karachi East-II	Karachi East
PS-100 Karachi East-IV	NA-236 Karachi East-II	Karachi East
PS-103 Karachi East-VII	NA-237 Karachi East-III	Karachi East
PS-104 Karachi East-VIII	NA-237 Karachi East-III	Karachi East
PS-105 Karachi East-IX	NA-237 Karachi East-III	Karachi East
PS-101 Karachi East-V	NA-238 Karachi East-IV	Karachi East
PS-102 Karachi East-VI	NA-238 Karachi East-IV	Karachi East
PS-106 Karachi South-I	NA-239 Karachi South-I	Karachi South
PS-107 Karachi South-II	NA-239 Karachi South-I	Karachi South
PS-107 Karachi South-II	NA-240 Karachi South-II	Karachi South
PS-108 Karachi South-III	NA-240 Karachi South-II	Karachi South
PS-109 Karachi South-IV	NA-241 Karachi South-III	Karachi South
PS-110 Karachi South-V	NA-241 Karachi South-III	Karachi South
PS-112 Karachi Keamari-II	NA-242 Karachi Keamari-I	Keamari
PS-113 Karachi Keamari-III	NA-242 Karachi Keamari-I	Keamari
PS-114 Karachi Keamari-IV	NA-242 Karachi Keamari-I	Keamari
PS-111 Karachi Keamari-I	NA-243 Karachi Keamari-II	Keamari
PS-115 Karachi Keamari-V	NA-243 Karachi Keamari-II	Keamari
PS-116 Karachi West-I	NA-244 Karachi West-I	Karachi West
PS-117 Karachi West-II	NA-244 Karachi West-I	Karachi West
PS-118 Karachi West-III	NA-245 Karachi West-II	Karachi West
PS-119 Karachi West-IV	NA-245 Karachi West-II	Karachi West
PS-120 Karachi West-V	NA-246 Karachi West-III	Karachi West
PS-121 Karachi West-VI	NA-246 Karachi West-III	Karachi West
PS-122 Karachi Central-I	NA-247 Karachi Central-I	Karachi Central
PS-123 Karachi Central-II	NA-247 Karachi Central-I	Karachi Central
PS-124 Karachi Central-III	NA-248 Karachi Central-II	Karachi Central
PS-125 Karachi Central-IV	NA-248 Karachi Central-II	Karachi Central
PS-126 Karachi Central-V	NA-248 Karachi Central-II	Karachi Central
PS-127 Karachi Central-VI	NA-249 Karachi Central-III	Karachi Central
PS-128 Karachi Central-VII	NA-249 Karachi Central-III	Karachi Central
PS-129 Karachi Central-VIII	NA-250 Karachi Central-IV	Karachi Central
PS-130 Karachi Central-IX	NA-250 Karachi Central-IV	Karachi Central

== CNIC codes ==
- Nazimabad District 42101
- Gulshan District 42201
- Karachi District 42301
- Orangi District 42401
- Korangi District same as Gulshan District
- Malir District 42501
- Keamari District same as Orangi District
