= Junaid Nagar =

Coordinates: 24°58′N 66°57′E

Yaqubabad (Urdu: جنید نگر) is a neighborhood in Orangi Town in Karachi, Sindh, Pakistan.

There are several ethnic groups including Muhajirs, Sindhis, Kashmiris, Seraikis, Pakhtuns, Balochis, Memons, Bohras Ismailis, etc.
