= Madina Colony, Orangi Town =

Neighbourhood in Karachi, Pakistan

Madina Colony (Urdu: مدینہ کالونی) is a neighbourhood in the Orangi municipality of Karachi, Pakistan. It is administered as part of Karachi West district, but was part of the Orangi Town borough until that was disbanded in 2011.

There are several ethnic groups in Madina Colony including Muhajirs, Sindhis, Kashmiris, Seraikis, Pakhtuns, Balochis, Memons, Bohras, Ismailis and Christians.
