= Fareed Town Islamabad =

Fareed Town فرید ٹاون
- City District
- Motto: New Development of Islamabad
- Location In Pakistan
- Coordinates: 33°36′59.1″N 72°56′22.1″E
- Country: Pakistan
- Territory: Islamabad Capital Territory

Area
  - Total: 25.00 km^{2} (9.65 sq mi)

Population (2011)
  - Total: 4,000
  - Density: 160/km^{2} (410/sq mi)
- Time zone: UTC+5 (PST)
- Area code: 051

Fareed Town (Urdu: فرید ٹاون) is a new town in the H-15 Sector of Islamabad. The H sectors of Islamabad are mostly dedicated to educational and health institutions. National University of Sciences and Technology covers a major portion of sector H-12.
