= Khuwaja Sohail Mansoor =

Pakistani politician

Member of the National Assembly of Pakistan
- In office 2008 – 31 May 2018
- Constituency: NA-240 (Karachi-II)

Personal details
- Born: Karachi, Sindh, Pakistan
- Party: IND (2025–present)
- Other political affiliations: PPP (2023–2024); MQM-L (2008–2023)

Khuwaja Sohail Mansoor (Urdu: خواجہ سہیل منصور; born 2 February 1960) is a Pakistani politician who had been a member of the National Assembly of Pakistan from 2008 to May 2018.

== Early life ==
He was born on 2 February 1960.

== Political career ==
He was elected to the National Assembly of Pakistan as a candidate of Muttahida Qaumi Movement (MQM) from Constituency NA-240 (Karachi-II) in the 2008 Pakistani general election. He received 67,799 votes and defeated Abdullah Boloch, a candidate of Pakistan Peoples Party (PPP).

He was re-elected to the National Assembly as a candidate of MQM from Constituency NA-240 (Karachi-II) in the 2013 Pakistani general election. He received 87,805 votes and defeated Naz Baloch.

He ran for the seat of the National Assembly from Constituency NA-239 (Korangi Karachi-I) as a candidate of MQM in the 2018 Pakistani general election, but was unsuccessful. He received 68,811 votes and lost the seat to Akram Cheema, a candidate of the Pakistan Tehreek-e-Insaf (PTI)

On 5 February 2023, he joined the Pakistan People's Party (PPP).

He is the PPP candidate for the 2023 by-election in NA-256 (Karachi Central-IV).
