= Gabol Colony =

Busy area of Orangi Town

Coordinates: 24°57′N 67°00′E

Gabol Colony (Urdu: گبول کالونی) is in the Orangi municipality of Karachi, Pakistan. It is administered as part of Karachi West district, but was part of the Orangi Town borough until that was disbanded in 2011.

There are several ethnic groups in Orangi Town including Urdu speakers, Sindhi, Kashmiris, Seraikis, Pakhtuns, Balochs, Memons, Bohras, Ismailis.
