= Iqbal Baloch Colony =

Neighborhood of Orangi Town, Pakistan

Iqbal Baloch Colony (Urdu: اقبال بلوچ کالونی) is a neighbourhood in the Orangi municipality of Karachi, Pakistan. It is administered as part of Karachi West district, but was part of the Orangi Town borough until that was disbanded in 2011.

This colony is situated in sector 11-1/2, which is the largest sector of orangi town in population. There are several ethnic groups in Iqbal Baloch Colony including Muhajirs, Sindhis, Meo, Kashmiris, Seraikis, Pakhtuns, Balochis, Memons, Bohras, Ismailis, etc. Over 99% of the population is Muslim. The population of Orangi Town is estimated to be nearly three million.
