= Banaras Flyover =

Banaras Flyover بنارس سر پل
- Interactive map of Banaras Flyover بنارس سر پل

Location
- Karachi, Sindh, Pakistan
- Coordinates: 24.9327°N 67.0155°E
- Roads at junction: North Nazimabad; Sajidabad

Construction
- Type: Flyover
- Lanes: 2 one-way traffic
- Constructed: by Kainatt Enterprises (PVT) Ltd
- Opened: 2012

The Banaras Flyover is the largest flyover in Karachi, Pakistan and made due to the deadliest riot in the history of Pakistan, the Qasba Aligarh massacre. Spanning nearly two kilometers in length and 24 meters in width, it is one of the city's most significant and longest infrastructural projects. The flyover connects North Nazimabad to Sajidabad and Orangi Town, alleviating traffic congestion in one of Karachi's busiest areas. Officially inaugurated in 2012, the flyover had partial access during its construction phase prior to the official opening.

Constructed at an estimated cost of approximately PKR 1 billion, the Banaras Flyover involved extensive use of heavy machinery, impacting the surrounding areas, including the destruction of local road gutters and drainage systems. The project aimed to improve traffic flow, reduce commute times, and enhance connectivity between the adjoining neighborhoods.

The flyover passes over Bacha Khan Chowk, a historically significant intersection named after Abdul Ghaffar Khan (Bacha Khan), a prominent Pashtun leader and advocate of non-violence. Before the flyover's construction, Bacha Khan Chowk was a vibrant public space, often used for political rallies and community gatherings. However, the construction of the flyover has overshadowed this area, transforming the space beneath it into an underutilized and poorly maintained environment.

Although officially referred to as the Banaras Flyover, the project has been a subject of political contention. The Awami National Party (ANP), with a stronghold in the area, pushed for naming the flyover after Bacha Khan to honor his legacy. Despite these efforts, the official name remains tied to Banaras Colony, the neighborhood primarily served by the flyover.
