= Ghaziabad, Karachi =

Pakistani neighbourhood

Ghaziabad (Urdu: غازی آباد) is a neighbourhood in the Orangi municipality of Karachi, Pakistan. It is administered as part of Karachi West district, but was part of the Orangi Town borough until that was disbanded in 2011.

There are several ethnic groups in Ghaziabad including Muhajirs, Punjabi, Kashmiris, Seraikis, Pakhtuns, Balochis, Memons, Bohras, Ismailis, etc. Over 99 percent of the population is Muslim. The population of Orangi Town is estimated to be nearly one million.
