= Golimar =

Golimar may refer to:

- Golimar, Karachi, a neighbourhood of S.I.T.E. Town, Karachi, Pakistan
- Golimaar (film), a 2010 Telugu action film
- "Golimar", a song from the 1985 Telugu film Donga

== See also ==
- Old Golimar, another neighbourhood of S.I.T.E Town
