= Qasba Colony =

Residential neighbourhood in Karachi, Pakistan

Coordinates: 24°56′N 67°01′E

Qasba Colony (Urdu: قصبہ کالونی) is a neighborhood in the Karachi West district of Karachi, Pakistan. It is administered as part of the SITE Town neighbourhood.

There are several ethnic groups in Qasba Colony including Muhajirs, Pakhtuns, Hazarewal, Sindhis and Punjabis. Over 99% of the population is Muslim. Where about 50% of population consists of Urdu Speakers while 30% Pukhtuns 10% Punjabi and 10% other ethnic groups. The population of Qasba Colony is estimated to be nearly 90,000. Total area of this Union council is 5.37 square kilometers.

It is a well-developed colony established by Saudi Government in 1965. There are two colleges in this locality one is Degree Science & Commerce College for boys and other is Degree Science & Commerce College for girls.

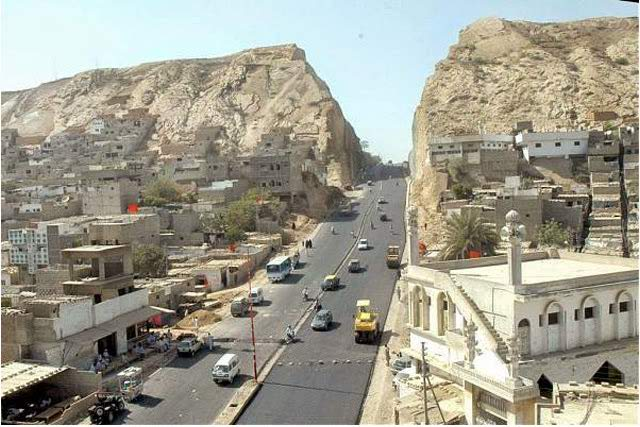
Kati Pahari Bypass

There are several parks in the colony with one flood lights decorated football ground. The Kati Pahari bypass between North Nazimabad and Qasba Colony constructed by the National Highway Authority (NHA), inaugurated by Governor Dr. Ishrat ul Ibad Khan along with City Nazim Syed Mustafa Kamal on 15 October 2009, after that Orangi Town, Qasba Colony and Other SITE Town's union councils using this way to travel easily from these towns to North Nazimabad, North Karachi and Qaim Khani Colony.

== Facilities ==
In Qasba colony many facilities are available for the peoples like parks, playgrounds, football stadiums, private and government schools, private hospitals and clinics, and OPP is playing an important role for the health and many other useful facilities for Qasba peoples. There is no public transport except Qinchi.

== Hospital & Dispensary ==
- Saud Hospital & Maternity Centre (K-Area)
- Al-Wali Homoeopathic Clinic (Quarter Area)
- Dr. Asim Clinic (E-Area)
- Dr. Fazal Clinic (E-Area)
- Najam-ul-Arfin Clinic (A-1 Area)
- Dr. Wajid Clinic (R-1 Area)
- Paracha Hospital (Muhammad pur, but now it is not functional)
- Edhi Mental Asylum
- One 50 beds hospital is under construction
- Dr. Zafer Clinic (K Area)
- Rafi Hospital (F Area)

== Main Areas ==
- Quarters Area.
- Sector A, A-1, R-1, E, F, 5-AL, 4-l, G, H, K & LS. Area.
- Mohammad Pur.
- Muslimabad.
- Peerabad.
- Aawan-e-Itahad

== Masajids ==
- Madina Masjid (Quarter Area)
- Dar-ul-hamd (E Area)
- Ghousia Masjid (H Area)
- Rahmatul lil alameen (Quarter Area)
- Jamia masjid Akbar (5-L)
- Jamia masjid Khadijat-ul-kubra (5-L)
- Muhammadi Masjid (Peerabad)
- Alfalah Masjid (Muslimabad)
- Jamia Masjid Bilal (Islamia no. 2)
- Ali imam bargha 2/1 #
- Jamia Masjid Mustafa (Islamia Colony No. 1)

Jamia Masjid Ansar (Islamia Colony No. 1) Jamia Masjid Allah O Akbar (Islamia Colony No. 1)

- Jamia Masjid Hamza (Muslimabad # 02)
- Firdous Masjid (E area)
- Jafaria Masjid (F area)
- Anjuman Hussaini Hazara (A,1)
- Bismillah Masjid (Muhammadpur)

== Colleges ==
- Govt Degree Science & Commerce College (a.k.a. Badayuni College)
- Govt Degree Girls College, Qasba Colony

== Schools ==
- Naunehal Secondary School
- Govt. Boys & Girls Sec. School (K-Area)
- Pak Grammar high School (F or K-Area)
- Rose Gardan Secondary school (Islamia)
- Shahbaz Secondary School (A-Area)
- Helicon sec School (Quarter Area)
- Fine Hills View Secondary School
- Rahbar Grammar School (A1 Area)
- Govt. Boys & Girls Sec School (5-L)

== Parks ==
- Ameen Shaheed Football Stadium (Ali Ground)(Near Ali Imambargha)
- Nadeem-ur-Rehman Park (R-1 Area)
- Ashfaq Shaheed Park (A-1 Area)
- Grand Park (K Area Opp Jamia Rabbania)
- Bacha Khan Park (Peerabad)
- Shaheed Kashif Park (A Area)

== Public Representatives of Area ==
- Attaullah (MNA, NA-250)
- Saeed Ahmad Afridi (Member, Provincial Assembly of Sindh (PS-120))
- Izharuddin Ahmed Khan (EX-Town Nazim)(Ex-Chairman District West)
- Syed Badshah Khan (EX-Naib Town Nazim)
- Mazahir Amir Khan (EX-Nazim 2005-2008) (Former member, Provincial Assembly of Sindh (2008-2018))
- Meer Fasahatullah (EX- Naib Nazim 2005-2010)
- Munawwar Hussain Naqvi (UC Chairman) (2015-2019)
- Habib Ahmed Siddiquie Alias Choor (UC Vice Chairman) (2015-2019)
