= City Districts of Pakistan =

Pakistani administrative areas

City Districts of Pakistan are districts in Pakistan are primarily comprising urban areas, such as a mega city or large metropolitan areas. Out of the 150 total districts in Pakistan, only 8 were designated as "city districts" in 2001. These city districts have administrative boards responsible for specific areas of governance within their jurisdictions. The degree of administrative autonomy varies significantly among these districts.

== Administrative structure ==
City districts consist of a three-tier or four-tier system of government. Each city district is subdivided into Tehsils (or Towns), which are further subdivided into Union Councils, which may further be subdivided into Wards.

Subdivision	Government
City District	City District government
Municipal Corporation	Municipal Corporation Government
Town	Town municipal administration
Union Council	Union administration
Ward	Ward administration

== List of city districts ==
=== Sindh Province ===
Karachi City is a division itself and it comprises seven districts that work together under the Karachi Metropolitan Corporation.

- Karachi Central District (established 1996)
- Karachi East District (established 1972)
- Karachi South District (established 1972)
- Karachi West District (established 1972)
- Malir District (established 1996)
- Korangi District (established in 2013)
- Keamari District (established in 2020)

During 14 Aug 2001 to 2011, Karachi Division was abolished and all of the five districts (at that time) of Karachi were merged into single city district, forming city district government Karachi i.e CDGK.

=== Punjab Province ===
On 14 Aug 2001, 5 major urban districts of Punjab were given the status of City Districts. These Districts were the Headquarters of Divisions of Punjab before 2001. The Bahawalpur and Dera Ghazi Khan headquarters were not included in city districts due to semi-urban status.

- Lahore District
- Rawalpindi District
- Faisalabad District
- Multan District
- Gujranwala District
- Sargodha District

=== Khyber Pakhtunkhwa ===
- Peshawar District

=== Baluchistan Province ===
- Quetta District
