= Mujahidabad =

Settlement in Karachi, Pakistan

Coordinates: 24°56′N 66°57′E

Mujahidabad (Urdu: مجاہد آباد) is a neighbourhood in the Orangi municipality of Karachi, Pakistan. It is administered as part of Karachi West district, but was part of the Orangi Town borough until that was disbanded in 2011.

There are several ethnic groups in Mujahidabad including Muhajirs, Sindhis, Kashmiris, Seraikis, Pakhtuns, Balochis, Memons, Bohras, Ismailis, etc.
