= Abdul Kadir Khanzada =

Pakistani politician

Member of the National Assembly of Pakistan
- In office 2002–2013
- Constituency: NA-242 (Karachi-IV)

Personal details
- Born: Karachi, Sindh, Pakistan

Abdul Kadir Khanzada is a Pakistani politician who was a member of the National Assembly of Pakistan from 2002 to 2013.

== Political career ==
He was elected to the National Assembly of Pakistan from Constituency NA-242 (Karachi-IV) as a candidate of Muttahida Qaumi Movement (MQM) in by-polls held in January 2003. He received 67,051 votes and defeated Meraj Ul Huda Siddiqui, a candidate of Muttahida Majlis-e-Amal (MMA). He was made parliamentary secretary for communication in 2003.

He was re-elected to the National Assembly from Constituency NA-242 (Karachi-IV) as a candidate of MQM in the 2008 Pakistani general election. He received 147,892 votes and defeated Muhammad Afaque Khan, a candidate of Pakistan Peoples Party (PPP).

== Personal life ==
Khanzada's family originated from Alwar in Rajasthan, from where they migrated to Pakistan. He is a direct descendant of Raja Nahar Khan.
