= Jahanabad (Karachi) =

Neighborhood in Karachi, Pakistan

Jahanabad (Urdu: جهان آباد) is a neighborhood in the Karachi West district of Karachi, Pakistan. It was previously administered as part of the SITE Town borough, which was disbanded in 2011.

== Main areas ==
Syed Mohallah

- Hasan Oliya Village
- Dehyani Mohalla
- Haroonabad
- Lashari Mohalla
- Magsi Mohalla
- Mianwali Colony
- Unaited Colony
