= Mahboob Alam (politician) =

Pakistani politician

Member of the National Assembly of Pakistan
- In office 1 June 2013 – 31 May 2018
- Constituency: NA-242 (Karachi-IV)

Personal details
- Born: 1 January 1968 (age 58) Karachi, Sindh, Pakistan
- Party: MQM-P (2023-present)
- Other political affiliations: PSP (2018-2023); MQM-L (2013-2018)

Mahboob Alam (Urdu: محبوب عالم; born 1 January 1968) is a Pakistani politician who had been a member of the National Assembly of Pakistan from June 2013 to May 2018.

== Early life ==
He was born on 1 January 1968.

== Political career ==
He was elected to the National Assembly of Pakistan as a candidate of Muttahida Qaumi Movement (MQM) from Constituency NA-242 (Karachi-IV) in the 2013 Pakistani general election. He received 166,836 votes and defeated Akram Khan, a candidate of Pakistan Tehreek-e-Insaf (PTI).

In April 2018, he quit MQM and joined Pak Sarzameen Party (PSP).
