= NA-245 Karachi West-II =

Constituency of the National Assembly of Pakistan

- Constituency for the National Assembly of Pakistan
- Region: Orangi Town, Mangophir Town (partly) and Mominabad Town (partly) of Karachi West District in Karachi
- Electorate: 375,285

Current constituency
- Created: 30 November 2023
- Party: MQM-P
- Member: Syed Hafeezuddin
- Created from: NA-240 Karachi-II

NA-245 Karachi West-II (این اے-245،کراچی مغربی-2) is a constituency for the National Assembly of Pakistan.

== Area ==
The constituency includes Orangi Town area of Karachi West District.

Data Nagar, Qatar Mor, Sector 1,6,7,8, Kati Pahari, Iqbal Goth Baloch Goth, Pakhtun Abad, New Mianwali Colony, Manghopir (partly)

== Assembly Segments ==
Constituency number	Constituency	District	Current MPA	Party
118	PS-118 Karachi West-III	Karachi West District	Naseer Ahmed	MQM-P
119	PS-119 Karachi West-IV	Karachi West District	Ali Khursheedi	MQM-P

== Members of Parliament ==
=== 2018–2023: NA-250 Karachi West-III ===
Election	Member	Party
2018	Attaullah Niazi	PTI

=== 2024–present: NA-245 Karachi West-II ===
Election	Member	Party
2024	Syed Hafeezuddin	MQM–P

== Election 2002 ==
General elections were held on 10 October 2002. Sarkaruddin Advocate of Muttahida Qaumi Movement won by 30,408 votes.

General election 2002: NA-240 Karachi West-II
Party	Candidate	Votes	%	±%
MQM	Sarkar-Ud-Din	30,408	35.18	
MMA	Shireen Muhammad	22,764	26.33	
PPP	Muhammad Buksh Lashari	15,374	17.79	
PML(Q)	K.S. Mujahid Khan Baloch	6,090	7.05	
PST	Muhammad Iftikhar Ahmed Bhatti	6,063	7.01	
Others	Others (nine candidates)	5,745	6.64	
Turnout		87,336	39.28	
Total valid votes		86,444	98.98	
Rejected ballots		892	1.02	
Majority		7,644	8.85	
Registered electors		222,359		

== Election 2008 ==
General elections were held on 18 February 2008. Khuwaja Sohail Mansoor of Muttahida Qaumi Movement won by 67,799 votes.

General election 2008: NA-240 Karachi West-II
Party	Candidate	Votes	%	±%
MQM	Khuwaja Sohail Mansoor	67,799	51.86	
PPP	Abdullah Baloch	61,017	46.67	
Others	Others (five candidates)	1,921	1.47	
Turnout		130,879	46.79	
Total valid votes		130,737	99.89	
Rejected ballots		142	0.11	
Majority		6,782	5.19	
Registered electors		279,723		
MQM hold				

== Election 2013 ==
General elections were held on 11 May 2013. Khuwaja Sohail Mansoor of Muttahida Qaumi Movement won by 87,805 votes and became the member of National Assembly.

General election 2013: NA-240 Karachi West-II
Party	Candidate	Votes	%	±%
MQM	Khuwaja Sohail Mansoor	87,805	54.33	
PTI	Naz Baloch	21,096	13.05	
PPP	Abid Hussain Sathi	19,360	11.98	
Independent	Muhammad Nawaz Khan Niazi	10,784	6.67	
MDM	Taj Muhammad Hanfi	9,271	5.74	
JUI (F)	Faizul Haq	6,024	3.73	
JI	Syed Attaullah Shah	4,222	2.61	
Others	Others (six candidates)	3,040	1.89	
Turnout		163,141	56.81	
Total valid votes		161,102	99.06	
Rejected ballots		1,539	0.94	
Majority		66,709	41.28	
Registered electors		287,170		
MQM hold				

== Election 2018 ==
General elections were held on 25 July 2018.

General election 2018: NA-250 Karachi West-III
Party	Candidate	Votes	%	±%
PTI	Attaullah Niazi	36,049	24.57	
MQM-P	Fayyaz Qaimkhani	29,086	19.82	
PPP	Ali Ahmed	24,690	16.83	
JI	Hafiz Naeem ur Rehman	22,629	15.42	
TLP	Syed Kashif Ali Shah	13,496	9.20	
ANP	Shahi Syed	11,385	7.76	
Others	Others (seven candidates)	9,382	6.40	
Turnout		149,853	37.40	
Total valid votes		146,717	97.91	
Rejected ballots		3,136	2.09	
Majority		6,963	4.75	
Registered electors		400,675		
PTI gain from MQM-P				

== Election 2024 ==
General elections were held on 8 February 2024. Syed Hafeezuddin won the election with 57,356 votes.

General election 2024: NA-246 Karachi West-III
Party	Candidate	Votes	%	±%
MQM-P	Syed Hafeezuddin	57,356	36.05	▲16.23
PTI	Attaullah Niazi (Note: Filed nomination papers as PTI candidate but ECP allowed him to run as an Independent)	36,788	23.12	▼1.45
JI	Muhammad Ishaq Khan	15,700	9.87	N/A
PPP	Siddique Akbar	12,526	7.87	▼8.96
JUI (F)	Amin Ullah	9,676	6.07	N/A
TLP	Wazir Ahmed Noorani	8,854	5.56	▼3.64
PML(N)	Syed Majeed Ullah	5,639	3.54	N/A
Others	Others (sixteen candidates)	12,564	7.90	
Turnout		162,220	43.23	▲5.83
Total valid votes		159,103	97.48	
Rejected ballots		3,117	2.52	
Majority		20,568	13.43	
Registered electors		375,285		
MQM-P gain from PTI				

== See also ==
- NA-244 Karachi West-I
- NA-246 Karachi West-III
