= Hanifabad =

Neighborhood in Karachi, Pakistan

Hanifabad (Urdu: حنیف آباد) is a neighbourhood in the Orangi municipality of Karachi, Pakistan. It is administered as part of Karachi West district, but was part of the Orangi Town borough until that was disbanded in 2011.

There are several ethnic groups in Orangi Town including Muhajirs, Sindhis, Kashmiris, Seraikis, Pakhtuns, Balochis, Memons, Bohras and Ismailis.
