= Mominabad Town =

Neighbourhood in the Orangi municipality of Karachi, Pakistan

Coordinates: 29°58′N 73°05′E

Mominabad Town مومن آباد ٹاؤن
- Constituent Town of Karachi
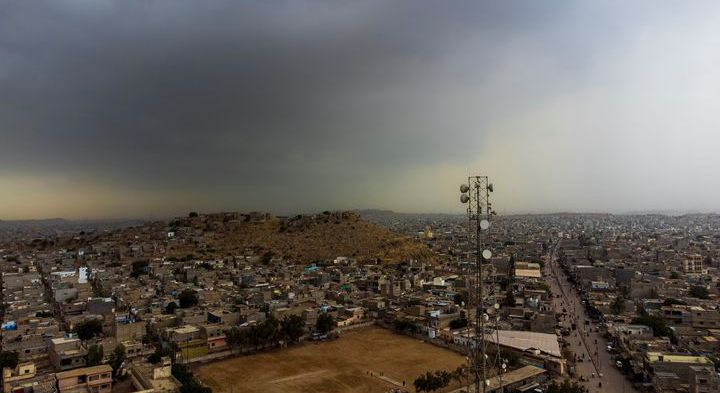
- Random view in Mominabad Town

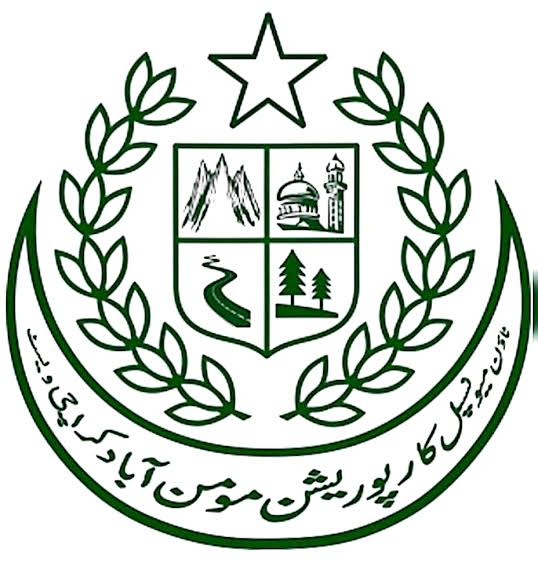
- Seal

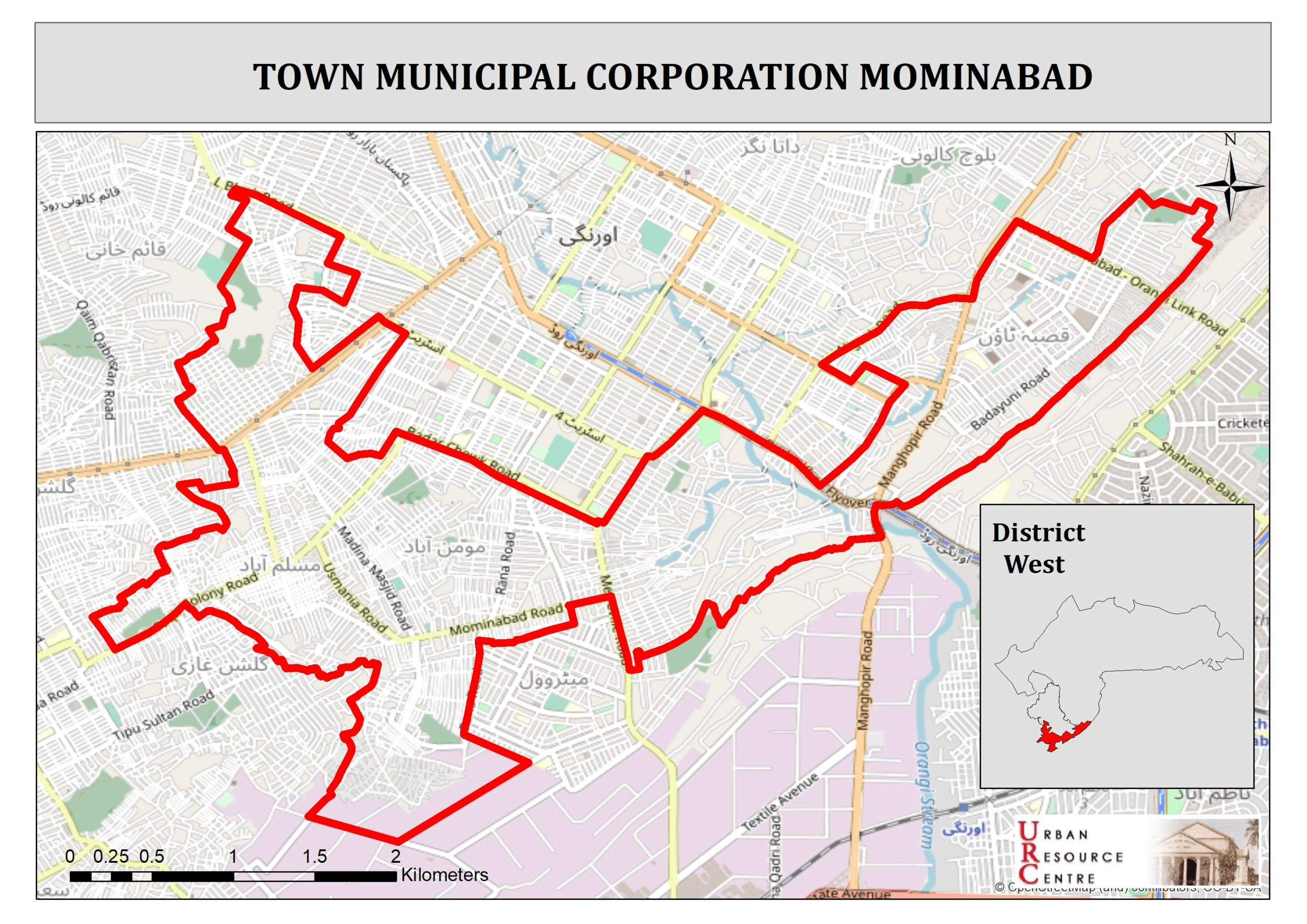
- Mominabad Town map in District Orangi
- Country: Pakistan
- Province: Sindh
- District: Orangi District
- Division: Karachi Division
- Town Chairman: Maalik Arif
- Municipal Commissioner: Agha Fahad
- Established: 2015
- Union Committees in Town Municipal Corporation: 09: Fareed Colony Haryana Colony Bismillah Colony Islam Nagar Mominabad Frontier Colony Banaras Colony Peerabad Qasba Colony

Government
  - Type: Government of Karachi
  - Constituency: NA-246 Karachi West-III
  - National Assembly Member: Syed Aminul Haque (Muttahida Qaumi Movement - Pakistan)

Area
  - Constituent Town of Karachi: 19 km^{2} (7.3 sq mi)
- Elevation: 59 m (194 ft)
- Highest elevation: 175 m (574 ft)
- Lowest elevation: 21 m (69 ft)

Population (2023 Pakistani census)
  - Constituent Town of Karachi: 1,000,708
  - Density: 52,668.84/km^{2} (136,411.7/sq mi)
  - Urban: 1,000,708
  - Rural: 0
- Demonym: Karachiite
- Time zone: UTC+05:00 (PKT)
  - Summer (DST): DST is not observed
- ZIP Code (K-p 2024): 07409
- NWD (area) code: 021
- ISO 3166 code: PK-SD

Mominabad Town (Urdu: مومن آباد ٹاؤن) is a neighbourhood in the Orangi municipality of Karachi, Sindh province of Pakistan. It is administered as one of the three towns of Orangi District (formerly Karachi West District, and part of the Orangi Town borough until that was disbanded in 2011). The population of Mominabad sub-division is 1,000,708 as of 2023 Pakistani census.

== Town Municipal Committee ==
As per the Sindh Local Government Act, 2021, Sindh government replaced the previous seven district municipal corporations (DMCs) with 26 towns, each with its own municipal committee. Karachi West District has three towns.

- Manghopir Town
- Mominabad Town
- Orangi Town

== Demographics ==
There are several ethnic groups in Mominabad. Total population of Mominabad Sub-Division is 1,000,708 consists of Males 525,476 and females 475,118 as of 2023 Pakistani census.

Languages of Mominabad Sub-Division (2023 Pakistani census)
1. Urdu (71.9%)
2. Pashto (15.4%)
3. Punjabi (3.78%)
4. Hindko (3.41%)
5. Balochi (2.19%)
6. Saraiki (0.90%)
7. Sindhi (0.80%)
8. Others (1.54%)

Language	Rank	2023 census	Speakers	2017 census	Speakers	Growth rate (2017-2023)
Urdu	1	71.89%	719,476	67.38%	569,932	▲6.7%
Pashto	2	15.45%	154,695	15.68%	132,664	▼1.5%
Balochi	3	2.19%	21,996	2.29%	19,399	▼4.4%
Punjabi	4	3.78%	37,880	5.30%	44,886	▼28%
Hindko	5	3.41%	34,173	3.97%	33,589	▼14%
Others	6	3.24%	32,488	5.35%	45,327	▼39%
All	7	100%	1,000,708	100%	845,797	▲18%

Religion

Religions in Mominabad sub-division (2023)
Religion	Percent
Islam	99.19%
Christianity	0.70%
Hinduism	0.07%
Other	0.02%

There are 992,673 Muslims, 7,042 Christians, 765 Hindus, 111 Ahmadiyya, 13 scheduled castes, 34 Sikhs, 1 Parsis and 69 others of total population 1,000,708 of Mominabad sub-division.

== Town Municipal Corporation ==
On 29 September 2022 Government of Sindh issued a notification of remaining names of Union Committees of Mominabad, Orangi District of Karachi Division.

09 Union Committees of Mominabad in Town Municipal Corporation

Sub Sr Number	Number of Union Committee	Name of UC in Town Municipal Corporation	Chairman/Vice Chairman
1	UC#01	Fareed Colony	Muhammad Kamran (Vise Chairman)
2	UC#02	Haryana Colony	Abdullah Baloch (Town Vice Chairman)
3	UC#03	Bismillah Colony	Arif Rehman (Vice Chairman)
4	UC#04	Islam Nagar	Abid Shah (Vice Chairman)
5	UC#05	Mominabad	Malik Arif Awan (Town Chairman)
6	UC#06	Frontier Colony	Mukhtiar Shah (Vice Chairman)
7	UC#07	Banaras Colony	Dr Kabeer (Vice Chairman)
8	UC#08	Peerabad	Nadir Ur Rehman (Vice Chairman)
9	UC#09	Qasba Colony	Syed Baseer Uddin (Vice Chairman)

== Mominabad Town Areas ==
- Bismillah Colony
- Frontier Colony
- Faqeer Colony
- Fareed Colony
- Haryana Colony
- Marajunabi Colony
- Mominabad
- Pathan Colony
- Pirabad
- Qasba Town
- Rahim Shah Colony
- Usmania Road
- Zia Colony

== Services ==
Parks and Play Grounds in TMC Mominabad

- Qasba Stadium Attached Ali Imam Bargah UC-08
- Peerabad Playground Near chatti Hotel UC-10
- Playground UC-15
- Mexico Play Ground UC-15
- Rahim Shah Playground UC-25
- Muhammadan Playground UC-25

Schools in TMC Mominabad

- DMC (West) Girls Sec. Sch. SST-11 UC-14
- DMC (West) Boys Primary. Sch. ST-39 UC-14
- DMC (West) Boys Primary. Sch. ST-37 UC-14
- DMC (West) Girls Primary. Sch. ST-38 UC-14
- DMC (West) Girls Primary School ST-34 UC-15
- DMC (West) Boys Primary School ST-35 UC-15
- DMC (West) Girls Primary School ST-36 UC-14
- DMC (West) Girls Primary School Sec 4/F UC-23
- DMC (West) Boys Primary School Sec 4/F UC-23
- DMC (West) Girls Primary School Sec 10 UC-22
- DMC (West) Boys Primary School Sec 10 UC-22
- DMC (West) Girls Primary School Sec 10/1. UC-20
- DMC (West) Boys Primary School Sec 10/L UC-20
- Office of the Director Education
- Office of the Dy. Director Education
- DMC (West) Boys Primary. Sch. ST-39 UC-14

Community Centres in TMC Mominabad

- Community Centre Near Masjid-e-Quba, Moulana Shoukat Ali Road Sec. 11-L
- Adjasant Orangi Fire Station Sec. 4-F

Dispensaries in TMC Mominabad

- Qasim Khatak Dispensary KP-128, Metroville Main Road
- Rashid Minhas Dispensary KP-127, Frontier Colony

== Adjoining areas ==
- Baldia Town
- Ittehad Town
- Manghopir Town
- Metroville SITE Town
- Orangi Town

== Constituency ==
National Assembly

- NA-246 Karachi West-III

Provincial Assembly

- PS-119 Karachi West-IV
- PS-120 Karachi West-V
- PS-121 Karachi West-VI
