= Baloch Goth =

Neighborhood in Karachi, Pakistan

Baloch Goth (Urdu: بلوچ گوٹھ) is a neighbourhood in the Orangi municipality of Karachi, Pakistan. It is administered as part of Karachi West district, but was part of the Orangi Town borough until that was disbanded in 2011.

There are several ethnic groups in Baloch Goth including Muhajirs, Sindhis, Kashmiris, Seraikis, Pakhtuns, Balochis, Memons, Bohras Ismailis, etc. Over 99% of the population is Muslim. The population of Orangi Town is estimated to be nearly one million.
