= Gabo Pat =

Coordinates: 24.89°N 66.81°E

Gabo Pat گابوپٹ
- union council
- Interactive map of Gabo Pat گابوپٹ
- Country: Pakistan
- Division: Karachi
- District: Keamari District
- Time zone: UTC+5 (PST)
- Postal code: 75300

Gabo Pat (Sindhi: گابو پٽ) (Urdu: گابوپٹ) is an area to the west of Karachi, in the Sindh province of Pakistan. It extends along the Arabian Sea coast westwards from the harbour of Karachi till Sindh's border with Balochistan province, and forms the westernmost part of Keamari District. The area is sparsely populated and consists of small rural and fishing villages. Abdul Rehman Village is the largest fishing village in Gabo Pat.

== Karachi Nuclear Power Plant ==
The Karachi Nuclear Power Plant (KANUPP) is located in Gabo Pat. The original reactor was built in 1972. Two further reactors were added in the 2020s, with two more proposed.
