= Gujjar Nala =

Natural stream or river in Karachi, Pakistan

Gujjhar River or Gujjhar Stream (Urdu: گُجر نالہ) is among the main streams of Karachi besides Orangi Stream. The term Gujjar Nala or Gujjar stream comes from the old historical name of the fresh water stream which was used for agriculture before the urbanisation of stream known locally by natives as Gujaro River later called Gujjar Nala after the urbanisation of the city towards west.

In May 2021, Awami Workers Party of Pakistan organised a demonstration for the victims of illegal evictions on the order of the Supreme Court in the Gujjar Nala and Orangi Nala areas of Karachi. A leader of the Gujjar Nala affected people, Abid Asghar reportedly said, "We have spent our childhood and youth in these houses. For you, these buildings are stone and mortar, but for us they are our life. Our only demand is that this operation be halted until we are given alternative housing in the same district, as per the order of the Supreme Court."
