= Rauf Siddiqui =

Pakistani politician

Member of the Provincial Assembly of Sindh
- In office August 2013 – 28 May 2018
- In office 2008–2013
- In office 2002–2007

Personal details
- Born: 15 April 1961 (age 65) Karachi, Sindh, Pakistan
- Party: MQM-P (2016-present)
- Other political affiliations: MQM-L (1988-2016)

Muhammad Abdur Rauf Siddiqui is a Pakistani politician who had been a Member of the Provincial Assembly of Sindh, since August 2013. Previously he had been a Member of the Provincial Sindh Assembly from 2002 to 2013 and remained a member of the Sindh provincial cabinet in various positions between 2002 and 2012.

== Early life and education ==
He was born on 15 April 1961 in Karachi.

He has a degree of Bachelors of Arts from University of Karachi. He earned the degree of Bachelor of Science from American Global International University, a fake diploma mill.

== Political career ==
He joined Muttahida Qaumi Movement - London (MQM-L) in 1988.

He was elected to the National Assembly of Pakistan as a candidate of MQM from Constituency NA-242 (Karachi-IV) in the 2002 Pakistani general election. In the same election, he was also elected to the Provincial Assembly of Sindh as a candidate of MQM from Constituency PS-115 Karachi-XXVII. He relinquished his National Assembly seat and retained the Sindh Assembly seat. In January 2003, he was inducted into the Sindh provincial cabinet and was appointed as Provincial Minister of Sindh for Excise and Taxation where he served until March 2004. In July 2004, he was made Provincial Minister of Sindh for Home where he remained until August 2006. In September 2006, he was made Provincial Minister of Sindh for tourism, culture and social welfare where he served until November 2007.

He was re-elected to the Provincial Assembly of Sindh as a candidate of MQM from Constituency PS-114 Karachi-XXVI in the 2008 Pakistani general election. In May 2008, he was inducted into the Sindh provincial cabinet and was made Provincial Minister of Sindh for industry and commerce where he remained until resigning in June 2011. In October 2011, he was re-inducted into the provincial Sindh cabinet and was re-appointed as Provincial Minister of Sindh for industry and commerce. In September 2012, he resigned from the Sindh provincial cabinet following the 2012 Pakistan factory fires.

He was re-elected to the Provincial Assembly of Sindh as a candidate of MQM from Constituency PS-103 Karachi-XV in by-polls held in August 2013. In April 2014, he was inducted into the Sindh provincial cabinet as Provincial Minister of Sindh.

In January 2018, he was declared accused in the 2012 Pakistan factory fires. In February 2018, he was indicted by an anti-terrorism court in the case.

== Personal life ==
He married for the first time in April 2018 in Saudi Arabia at the age of 56.
