= Haryana Colony =

Neighbourhood in Karachi

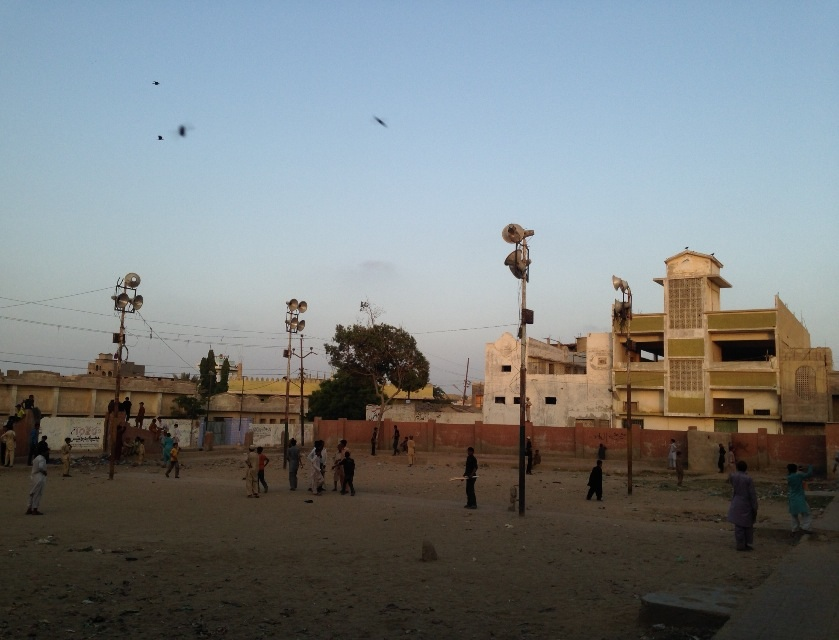
Playground of Haryana Colony

Haryana Colony (Urdu: ہریانہ کالونی) is a neighbourhood in the Al-Sadaf Colony municipality of Karachi, Pakistan. It is administered as part of Karachi West district, but was part of the Orangi Town borough until that was disbanded in 2011.

There are several ethnic groups in Orangi Town including Muhajirs, Rajputs, Sindhis, Kashmiris, Seraikis, Pakhtuns, Balochis, Memons, Bohras, Ismailis and Christians.
