= Chisti Nagar =

Residential neighborhood locality in Karachi, Pakistan

Coordinates: 24°58′N 66°57′E

Chisti Nagar or Chishti Nagar (Urdu: چشتی نگر) is a residential neighbourhood in the Orangi municipality of Karachi, Pakistan.

It is administered as part of Karachi West district, but was part of the Orangi Town borough until that was disbanded in 2011.

There are several ethnic groups including mainly (Muhajirs), some of Kashmiris, Seraikis, Pakhtuns, Balochis, Memons, Bohras Ismailis, etc. Over 99% of the population is Muslim. The population of Orangi town is estimated to be nearly one million.

This neighbourhood is named after the famous Sufi Hazrat Khawaja Mu'īnuddīn Chishtī of the Chishti Order.
