= Data Nagar =

Neighborhood in Karachi, Pakistan

Coordinates: 24°57′N 67°01′E

Data Nagar (Urdu: داتا نگر) is a residential neighbourhood in the Orangi municipality of Karachi, Pakistan.

It is administered as part of Karachi West district, but was part of the Orangi Town borough until that was disbanded in 2011.

The neighbourhood was named after a famous Sufi, Hazrat Bābā Farīduddīn Mas'ūd Data Ganjshakar.

The population includes several ethnic groups including Muhajirs, Sindhis, Kashmiris, Seraikis, Pakhtuns, Balochis, Memons, Bohras and Ismailis.
