= Haroonabad (Karachi) =

Banaras Colony (Urdu: ہارون آباد) is one of the neighbourhoods of S.I.T.E. Town in Karachi, Sindh, Pakistan.

Most of the population are Pakhtuns. Over 99% of the population is Muslim. The population of SITE Town is estimated to be nearly one million.
