= Frontier Colony =

Neighborhood of Karachi, Pakistan

Coordinates: 24°56′N 67°00′E

Frontier Colony (Urdu: فرنٹیر کالونی) is a neighborhood in the Karachi West district of Karachi, Pakistan. It was previously administered as part of the SITE Town borough, which was disbanded in 2011.

There are several ethnic groups in S.I.T.E. Town including Pakhtuns, Punjabi, Seraikis etc. Majority of Residence is Pakhtuns. Frontier Colony having 1 to 3 numbers and maximum area is Unplanned area where small premises and low income people living. There is 1 Union Council (UC-14).
