= Naz Baloch =

Pakistani politician

Member of the National Assembly
- In office 13 August 2018 – Till date

Personal details
- Born: 4 October 1982 (age 43) Karachi, Sindh, Pakistan
- Party: PPP (July 2017-present)
- Other political affiliations: PTI (2011-2017)

Naz Baloch (Urdu: ناز بلوچ) is a Pakistani politician, member of the National Assembly of Pakistan and Former Parliamentary Secretary Climate Change. She is affiliated with the Pakistan Peoples Party (PPP) and is a member of the Parliamentary Standing Committees on Human Rights, Planning, Development and Special Initiatives, and Industries and Production.

Baloch has officially represented Pakistan at several international forums, including the United Nations Climate Change Conference (COP27) held in Egypt, the Internet Governance Forum in Poland, and the United States Commercial Law Development Program (CLDP) in 2021. At these forums, she participated in discussions related to climate finance, digital governance and resilience.

== Early life and education ==
Baloch has bachelor's degree in Economics from St. Joseph's College. Her ethnically Baloch father, Abdullah Baloch, is a high-ranking member of Pakistan Peoples Party, Ex-Minister Zulfiqar Ali Bhutto tenure.

== Political career ==
After getting married on 22 April 2011, Baloch joined the Pakistan Tehreek-e-Insaf (PTI) in August 2011, turning down the option of joining her family's party, Pakistan Peoples Party (PPP). She is the only woman in her family to have taken part in party politics, as it is uncommon for Baloch women to take part in public affairs.

She contested general election from Sindh for national assembly in May 2013 as a candidate of PTI for the national assembly. She was the only women contestant in the Constituency NA-240 and was the runner-up, receiving 21,094 votes.

On 16 July 2017, Baloch joined the Pakistan Peoples Party (PPP), leaving her party affiliation with Pakistan Tehreek-e-Insaf (PTI).
