= Syed Hafeezuddin =

Pakistani politician

- Incumbent
- Assumed office 29 February 2024
- Constituency: NA-245 Karachi West-II

Member of the Provincial Assembly of Sindh
- In office 30 May 2013 – 23 April 2016
- Constituency: PS-93 Karachi-V

Member of National Assembly of Pakistan

Personal details
- Born: Karachi, Sindh, Pakistan
- Party: MQM-P (2023-present)
- Other political affiliations: PSP (2016-2023); PTI (2012-2016); PMLN (2012-2013)

Syed Hafeezuddin is a Pakistani politician from Karachi who had been a Member of the Provincial Assembly of Sindh, from 2013 to 2018.

== Political career ==
Formerly the chief organizer for Pakistan Muslim League (N)'s Karachi division, he announced to join Pakistan Tehreek-e-Insaf on 14 February 2012.

He was elected to the Provincial Assembly of Sindh as a candidate of Pakistan Tehreek-e-Insaf from Constituency PS-93 (Karachi-V) in the 2013 Pakistani general election.

Representing PTI, he also served as its provincial secretary general for Sindh.

He left PTI and joined Pak Sarzameen Party in April 2016.

He ran for the seat in Sindh Provincial Assembly as a candidate of PSP from Constituency PS-114 (Karachi West-III) in the 2018 Pakistani general election but was unsuccessful.
