= Qaim Khani Colony =

Coordinates: 24.9006°N 67.0137°E

Qaim Khani (Urdu: قائم خانی) is one of the neighbourhoods of SITE Town in Karachi, Sindh, Pakistan.

Qaimkhani or Kaimkhani (also spelled Qaim Khani and Kaim Khani) is a Muslim community that claims to be Muslim Rajputs. They converted to Islam in the 13th century.
