= Bhawani Chali =

Residential neighbourhood in Karachi, Pakistan

Pathan Colony or Pathan Challi (Urdu: پٹھان کالونی) is a neighborhood in the Karachi West district of Karachi, Pakistan. It is administered as part of the SITE Town borough.

There are several ethnic groups in Pathan Colony including Punjabis, Sindhis, Seraikis, Ismailis, etc., but the main population of Pathan Colony consist of Pakhtun, which is 90% in the area.

== Main areas ==
- Pathan Colony
