= Islamia Colony =

Neighborhood in Karachi, Pakistan

Coordinates: 34°00′N 71°28′E

Islamia Colony (Urdu: اسلامیہ کالونی) is a neighborhood in the Karachi West district of Karachi, Pakistan. It was previously administered as part of the SITE Town borough, which was disbanded in 2011.

There are several ethnic groups in Islamia Colony including Muhajirs, Punjabis, Sindhis, Malik, Awan, Niazi, Mianwali, Kashmiris, Seraikis, Pakhtuns, Balochis, Memons, Bohras, Ismailis, etc.

== Main areas ==
- Nusrat Bhutto Colony
- Ismaeel Malang Road
- New Mianwali Colony
- Kuari Colony
