= Syed Aminul Haque =

Pakistani politician (born 1962)

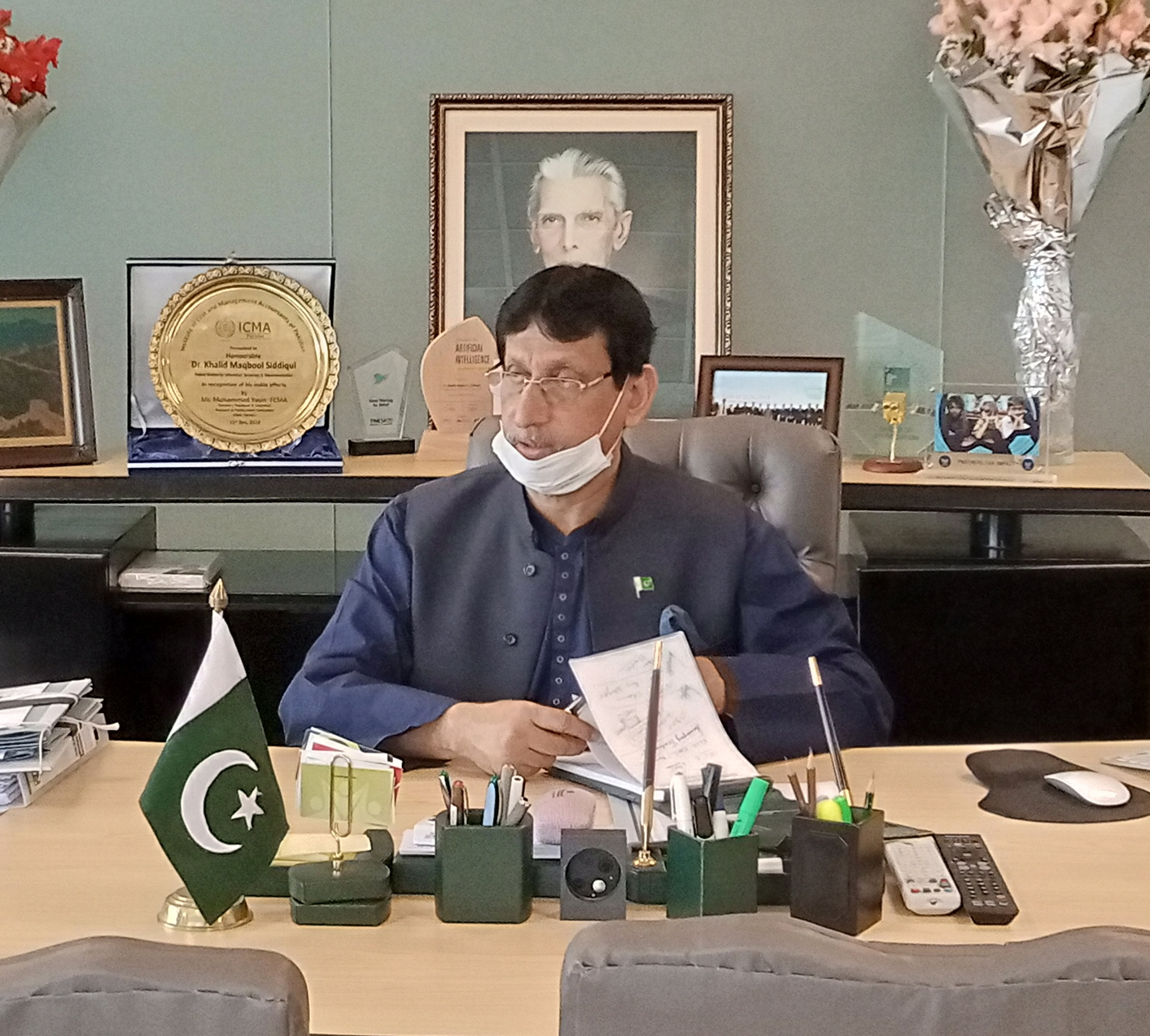

Minister of Information Technology & Telecommunication
- In office 6 April 2020 – 10 August 2023
- President: Arif Alvi
- Prime Minister: Imran Khan; Shehbaz Sharif
- Preceded by: Khalid Maqbool Siddiqui

Member of the National Assembly of Pakistan
- Incumbent
- Assumed office 29 February 2024
- Constituency: NA-246 Karachi West-III
- In office 13 August 2018 – 11 August 2023
- Constituency: NA-251 Karachi West-IV

Personal details
- Party: MQM-P (2018-present)
- Other political affiliations: MQM-L (1988-2018)
- Alma mater: Karachi University

Syed Aminul Haque (Urdu: سید امین الحق) is a Pakistani politician who has been a member of the National Assembly of Pakistan since February 2024 and previously served in this position from August 2018 till August 2023. He served as the Federal Minister of Information Technology and Telecommunication after resignation of MQM(P) Chief Khalid Maqbool Siddiqui.

He served twice in National Assembly before winning the general election of 2018. He is the part of Muttahida Qaumi Movement Pakistan (MQM-P) Party and a member of Rabta Committee of MQM Pakistan.

== Political career ==
He was elected to the National Assembly of Pakistan from constituency NA-251 (Karachi West-IV) as a candidate of Muttahida Qaumi Movement in the 2018 Pakistani general election. On 6 April 2020 he was appointed as Federal Minister for Telecommunications.

Amin-ul-Haque was elected 2 times as an MNA before general elections of 2018. He was first elected as a member of the national assembly on 16 November 1988 from NA-194 (Karachi East lll).

== See also ==
- List of members of the 15th National Assembly of Pakistan
- List of Pakistan Tehreek-e-Insaf elected members (2013–2018)
- No-confidence motion against Imran Khan
