= Orangi Town =

Residential town within the city of Karachi, Pakistan

Coordinates: 24°57′N 66°58′E

Orangi Town اورنگی ٹاؤن
- Constituent Town of Karachi
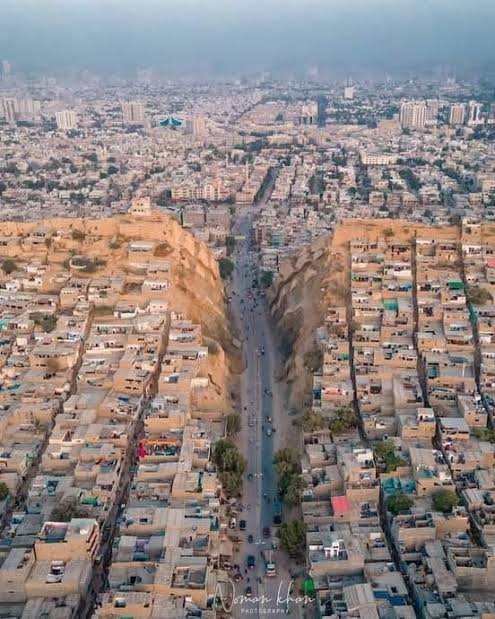
- Kati Pahari Orangi Town

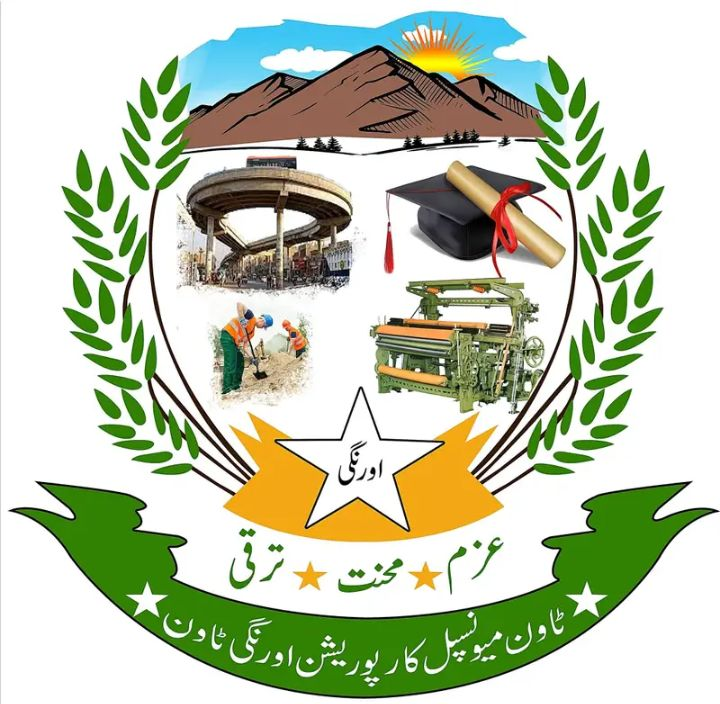
- Seal

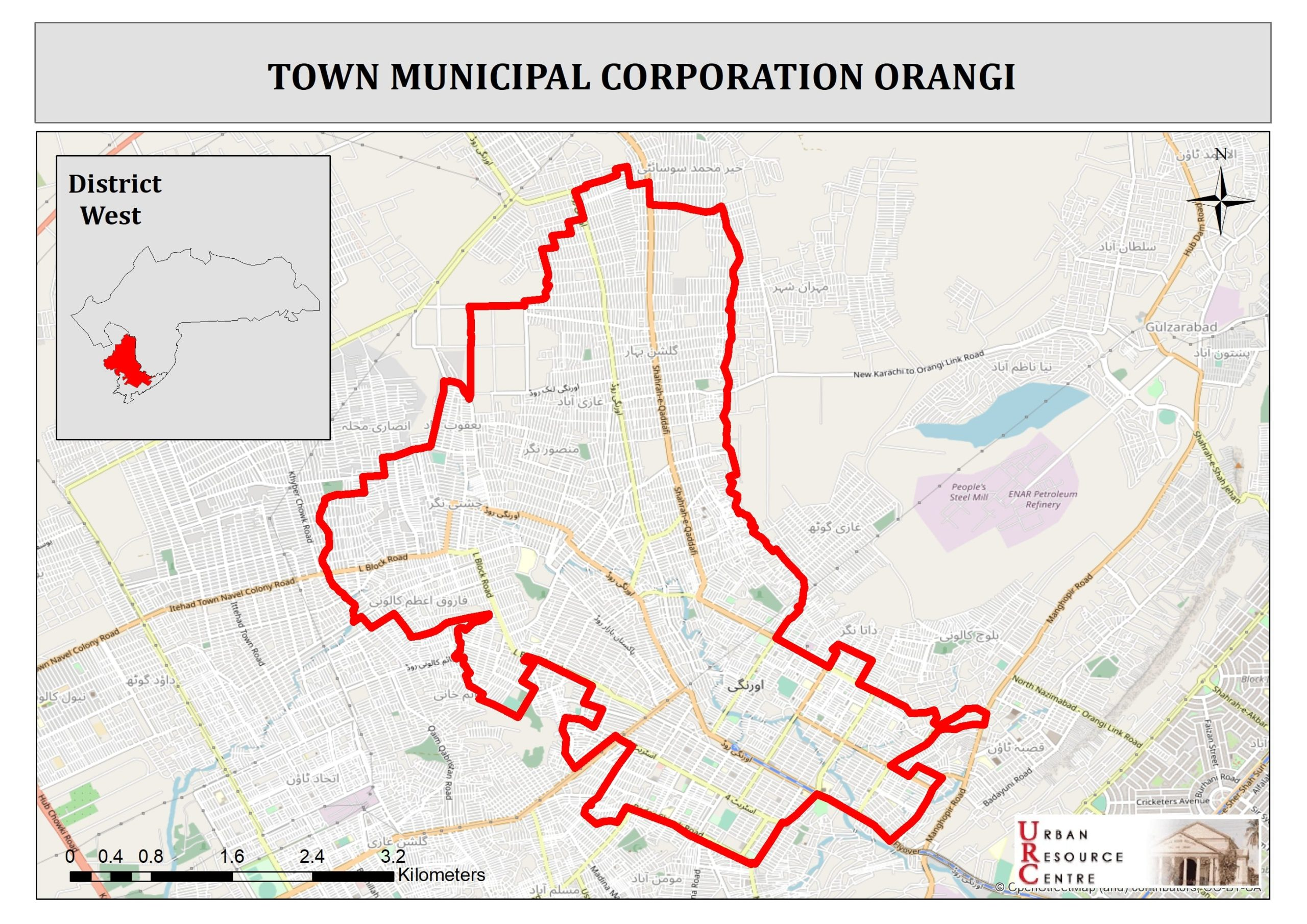
- Orangi Town map
- Town Chairman: Jameel Zia
- Municipal Commissioner: Agha Fahad
- District: Orangi District
- Division: Karachi Division
- Province: Sindh
- Country: Pakistan
- Established: 1972; 54 years ago
- Town status: 14 August 2001; 25 years ago
- Disbanded: 11 July 2011; 15 years ago
- Reorganized: March 2015; 11 years ago
- Union Committees in Town Municipal Corporation: 08: Gulshan-e-Zia Benazir Colony Muslim Nagar Colony Jinnah Colony Iqbal Baloch Colony Naeem Shah Bukhari Colony Shah Waliullah Nagar Data Nagar

Government
  - Type: Government of Karachi
  - Constituency: NA-245 Karachi West-II
  - National Assembly Member: Syed Hafeezuddin (Muttahida Qaumi Movement)

Area
  - Constituent Town of Karachi: 9 km^{2} (3.5 sq mi)
- Elevation: 58 m (190 ft)
- Highest elevation: 123 m (404 ft)
- Lowest elevation: 28 m (92 ft)

Population (2023 Pakistani census)
  - Constituent Town of Karachi: 596,919
  - Density: 66,324.33/km^{2} (171,779.2/sq mi)
  - Urban: 596,919
  - Rural: 0
- Demonym: Karachiite
- Time zone: UTC+05:00 (PKT)
  - Summer (DST): DST is not observed
- ZIP Code: 75800
- NWD (area) code: 021
- ISO 3166 code: PK-SD
- Motorways & Minor Arterial Road: M-10 & Shahrah-e-Qaddafi, New Karachi - Orangi Link Road

Orangi Town (Urdu: اُورنگی ٹاؤن) is a residential town of Orangi District located in the northwestern part of Karachi, Sindh, Pakistan. It was named after the sprawling municipality of Orangi.

== Town Municipal Committee ==
As per the Sindh Local Government Act, 2021, Sindh government replaced the previous seven District Municipal Corporations (DMCs) with 26 towns, each with its own municipal committee. Karachi West District has three towns.

- Manghopir Town
- Mominabad Town
- Orangi Town

== History ==
Town system was formed in August 2001 by dissolving Karachi District West as part of the Local Government Ordinance 2001, and was subdivided into 13 union councils. The town system was disbanded in July 2011. Orangi Town was re-organized as part of Orangi District (formerly Karachi West District) in March 2015. Orangi Town has a population of 596,919 as of the 2023 Pakistani census.

== Demographics ==
There are several ethnic groups in Orangi sub-division. The total population of Orangi sub-division is 596,919, including 316,870 male and 280,021 female residents as of the 2023 Pakistani census.

Languages of Orangi sub-division (2023 census)
1. Urdu (55.2%)
2. Pashto (30.3%)
3. Sindhi (3.83%)
4. Punjabi (3.20%)
5. Hindko (2.92%)
6. Saraiki (2.29%)
7. Others (2.32%)

Language	Rank	2023 census	Speakers	2017 Census	Speakers	Growth rate (2017-2023)
Urdu	1	55.25%	329,285	52.33%	272,224	▲5.6%
Pashto	2	30.32%	180,690	29.68%	154,421	▲2.1%
Sindhi	3	3.83%	22,856	3.73%	19,414	▲2.7%
Punjabi	4	3.20%	19,104	4.64%	24,159	▼31%
Hindko	5	2.92%	17,447	3.70%	19,273	▼21%
Saraiki	6	2.29%	13,686	3.27%	17,019	▼30%
Others	7	2.32%	13,851	2.63%	13,685	▼12%
All	8	100%	595,919	100%	520,195	▲14.5%

Religion

Religions in Orangi sub-division (2023)
Religion	Percent
Islam	98.54%
Christianity	1.46%
Hinduism	0.13%
Other	0.02%

There are 587,225 Muslims, 8,733 Christians, 793 Hindus, 20 Ahmadiyya, 13 scheduled castes, 94 Sikhs and 41 others of total population 595,919 of Orangi sub-division.

== Town Municipal Corporation ==
On 29 September 2022 Government of Sindh issued a notification of remaining names of Union Committees of Orangi Town, Orangi District of Karachi Division.

08 Union Committees of Orangi in Town Municipal Corporation

Sub Sr Number	Number of Union Committee	Name of UC in Town Municipal Corporation
1	UC#01	Gulshan-e-Zia
2	UC#02	Benazir Colony
3	UC#03	Muslim Nagar Colony
4	UC#04	Jinnah Colony
5	UC#05	Iqbal Baloch Colony
6	UC#06	Naeem Shah Bukhari Colony
7	UC#07	Shah Waliullah Nagar
8	UC#08	Data Nagar

== Geographics ==
Orangi Town is linked to New Karachi Town by th north east across the Shahrah-e-Zahid Hussain (New Karachi - Orangi Link Road), Baldia Town to the west through Baldia Stadium Road (Farid Colony - Gulshan-e-Ghazi Road) & North Nazimabad to the east via Kati Pahari (N.Nazimabad - Orangi link road) and also Bacha Khan Flyover. It is also linked to M-10 motorway (also called Northern Bypass) through Shahrah-e-Qaddafi and Orangi link road. There were 13 residential neighborhoods, called union councils within Orangi Town.

== Transport ==
The Orange Line - Karachi Metrobus, also known as the Abdul Sattar Edhi Line, is a 3.88 km (2.4 mi) bus rapid transit line of the Karachi Metrobus in Karachi, Sindh, Pakistan. It is the smallest of the five Metrobus lines in the city. The current daily ridership is 3,000. The route goes from Board Office to Gulshan-e-Zia (Orangi Town). It was inaugurated on 10 September 2022.

Orange Line - Karachi Metrobus goes from Board Office/Jinnah University to Orangi town TMA office, spanning about 4 kilometers. The line carries around 3,000 passengers daily with a station after every kilometer. Three of the four stations are at ground level, while one is elevated. Each station is 6 meters wide and 70 meters long.

== Orangi Town areas ==
- Baloch Goth
- Bilal Colony
- Chisti Nagar
- Raees Amrohi Colony
- Data Nagar
- Ghabool Town
- Ghaziabad
- Hanifabad
- Haryana Colony
- Iqbal Baloch Colony
- Madina Colony
- Mohammad Nagar
- Mominabad
- Mujahidabad
- Shah Khalid Colony
- Aligarh Colony
- Banarsi Town
- Farooq-e-Azam Colony
- Ghulfamabad
- Gulshan-e-Bahar
- Gulshan-e-Zia
- Gabol Colony
- Iqbal Colony
- Islamnagar
- Khairabad
- Mansoor Nagar
- Shahrah-e-Qaddafi
- Orangi Town, Sector 1
- Orangi Town, Sector 2
- Orangi Town, Sector 3
- Orangi Town, Sector 4
- Orangi Town, Sector 5
- Orangi Town, Sector 6
- Orangi Town, Sector 7
- Orangi Town, Sector 8
- Orangi Town, Sector 9
- Orangi Town, Sector 10
- Orangi Town, Sector 11½
- Orangi Town, Sector 12
- Orangi Town, Sector 13
- Orangi Town, Sector 14
- Orangi Town, Sector 15
- Orangi Town, Sector 16

== Bacha Khan Flyover (Banaras flyover) ==
The Banaras Flyover is the largest flyover in Karachi, Pakistan. Spanning nearly two kilometers in length and 24 meters in width, it is one of the city's most significant and longest infrastructural projects. The flyover connects North Nazimabad to Sajidabad and Orangi Town, alleviating traffic congestion in one of Karachi's busiest areas. Officially inaugurated in 2012, the flyover had partial access during its construction phase prior to the official opening. Banaras Flyover was built to prevent ethnic violence among two groups and to protect one from the other.

== See also ==
- Akhtar Hameed Khan
- Khasa Hills
- Orangi Charitable Trust
- Orangi Nala
- Orangi Pilot Project
