= Old Golimar =

Neighbourhood in Karachi, Pakistan

Old Golimar (Sindhi: پُراڻي گوليمار, Urdu: پرانا گولیمار) (new name is Gulbahar) is a neighborhood in the Karachi West district of Karachi, Pakistan. It is administered as part of the SITE Town neighbourhood.

== Main areas ==
Old Golimar is divided into eighteen neighbourhoods as follows:

- Abdullah Village
- Aisha Manzil
- Ali Muhammad Village
- Badal Village
- Central Muslimabad Village
- Ghafoor Village
- Ghulam Muhammad Village
- Haji Pariya Village
- Hingoro Village
- Khaskheli Village
- Mistri Khan Village
- Moula Dad Village
- Noor Muhammad Village
- Qadeemi Village
- Rakhsar Line
- Saleh Muhammad Village
- Shah Dost Village
- Naik Muhammad Village
- Rexer

== Demographics ==
Several ethnic groups inhabit Old Golimar, including Pathans, Mohajirs, Sindhis, Baloch, Brohi, and Punjabis.

Old Golimar is the centre of Karachi's Afridi and Sheedi community, who are now naturalized as Pathans while Sheedi community is assimilated into Sindhi and Baloch but they are of African descent.

== Infrastructure ==
Old Golimar is one of the oldest parts of Karachi. It has few schools, substandard hospitals, a poor water system, limited infrastructure and broken roads.

== Politics ==
Old Golimar has always been a stronghold of the ruling Pakistan People's Party. Now, a divide separates young and old. Imran Khan Pakistan Tehreek-e-Insaf is popular among the young.

== Sports ==
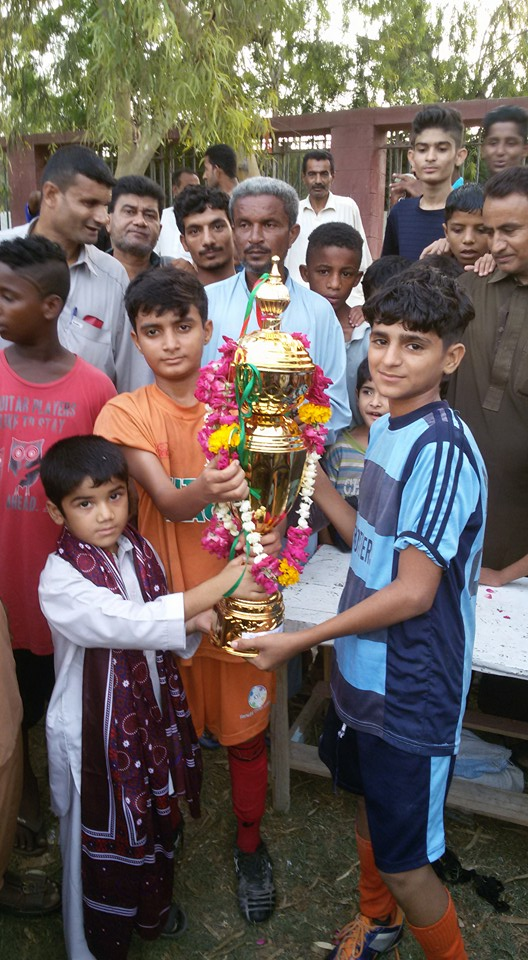

=== Football ===
Old Golimar supports some 15 registered football clubs, including Wali Afridi, Makran Sports, Parwana Sports, Golimar Azad, Balochistan Raiders.

During Ramadan, a football festival takes place in Old Golimar.

=== Cricket ===
Cricket became popular in Old Golimar after the 1996 World Cup, When Pakistan co-hosted the event with India, the cricket team BL-Sports from Noor Mohammad and Saleh Mohammad Village areas became popular.

Most of them amateur players who do not play on senior teams.

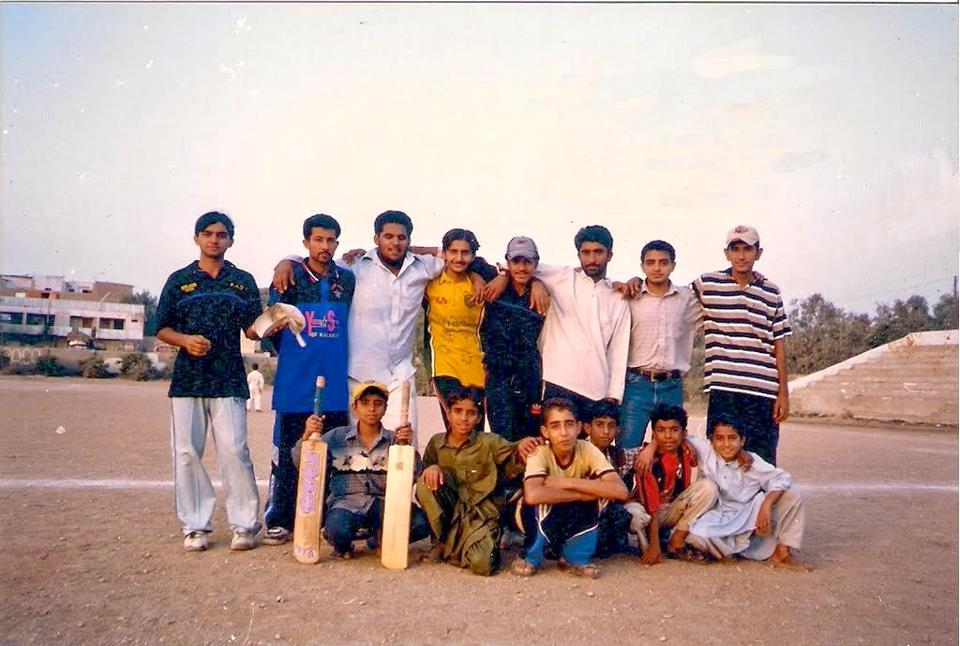

Popular players include Mustafa (Murali), Faheem (Sachin), Nasir Ali, Javed Ali, Haroon Shad, Akbar Dad, Mohsin Ali, Adeel Afzal, Akram Sabzal, Asad Abbasi Ahsan Ali, Akbar JR, Qaiser Abbasi, Kaleemullah Khan Tareen, Abdullah Tareen, Amin Baloch, Younas Baloch, Kamil Baloch, Salman Baloch and Saqib Aashiq Baloch.

Sameer Sports Cricket Club 1996 until 2016.

Asghar Ali Memorial Sports Cricket Club.

B-L-Sports Cricket Club 1996 until 2013.

Bulaidi Sports Cricket Club.

== Schools ==
Old Golimar has a government school named K.B Conductor Girls School.

White Rose Academy is a private school.

Bright way is a public school.

Rehman Public School is a private school in Old Golimar.

Iqra Public School is also a public school but it is very low in it standards.

== Graveyards ==
- Muslim Graveyard Mewa Shah Graveyard
- Gujarati community Shamshan Ghaat
- Hindu crematorium

== Religious buildings ==
- Main Masjid (Mosque) of Old Golimar Rashidun Caliphs
- Noorani Masjid (Mosque)at Noor Mohammad Village.
- Qadeemi Masjid (Mosque) at Qadeemi Muhallah.
- Afghani Masjid (Mosque) at Mistri Khan Village.
- Allah Wali Masjid (Mosque) at Rexerline.
- Usmania Masjid (Mosque) at Abdullah Gorgage Village
- Mustufa Masjid (mosque) at rexer line

== See also ==
- Lyari Town
- SITE Town
