= District Administration =

District Administration is a bimonthly printed and twice-daily digital B2B publication for education leaders in public K12 school districts. Based out of Palm Beach, Florida, and published by ETC, a brand owned by the UK-based Arc-network, which also publishes University Business magazine for higher education leaders, it is the only education magazine to reach every superintendent and principal in the country, along with assistant superintendents, technology directors, and federal funds administrators, among others.

With a circulation of 160,515, the magazine covers current trends and pressing issues being faced by leaders in the K12 education system along with coverage of emerging technologies and leadership issues for district-level administrators.

In addition to DA Daily, a daily digital newsletter, and the DA Daily PM edition, the District Administration print edition comes out six times per year and is direct-mailed to subscribers. DA also publishes a weekly newsletter called DALI Insider that covers issues pertinent to members of the District Administration Leadership Institute (DALI). It also publishes Tech Leader/FETC Weekly and DA Weekend Roundup as well as UB Weekend Roundup (for higher education leaders).
