= Banaras Colony =

Neighborhood in Karachi, Pakistan

Banaras Colony (Urdu: بنارس کالونی) is a Pashtun-majority neighbourhood in the Karachi West district of Karachi, Pakistan. It is administered as part of the SITE Town borough.

== Main areas ==
- Subhani Muhalla
- Rehmani Muhalla
- Rabbani Muhalla
- Frontier Colony
