= Metroville =

Neighborhood in Karachi, Pakistan

Coordinates: 24°55′N 67°00′E

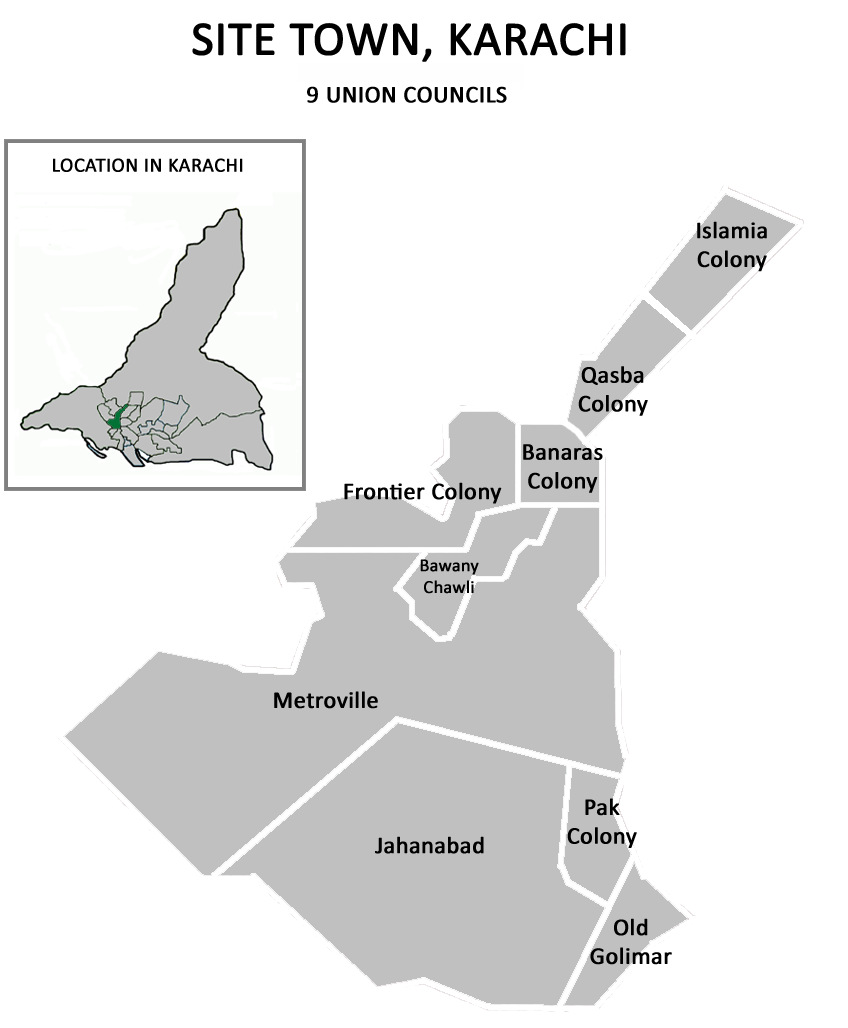
Location of Metroville in a map of SITE town

Metroville (Urdu: میٹروویل) is a neighborhood in the Karachi District kemari district of Karachi, Pakistan. It was previously administered as part of the Moriro Mirbahar Town borough, which was disbanded in 2011.

Foundition by Zulfiqar Ali Bhutto (Late) founding chairman of Pakistan Peoples Party. There are several ethnic groups in Metroville including Pakhtuns, Hazarewal, Punjabis, Sindhis, Kashmiris, Seraikis, Balochis, and Tadjiks etc. Over 99% of the population is Muslim.

== Political parties ==
- Pakistan Muslim League (Nawaz)
- Pakistan Peoples Party
- Pakistan Tehreek-e-Insaf
- Jamat-e-Islami Pakistan

== Islamic political parties ==
- Jamaat-e-Islami
- Jamiat Ulema-e-Islam

== Student wings of political parties ==
- Pukhtoon Students ederation
- Islami Jamiat-e-Talaba
- Peoples Students Federation
- Insaf Students Feseration
