= Orangi Nala =

Natural stream or small river in Karachi, Pakistan

Coordinates: 24°53′N 67°02′E

Orangi River (Urdu: اورنگی نالہ) is a small ephemeral stream that flows through the Pakistani megacity of Karachi from northeast to the centre and flows into the Lyari River towards Arabian Sea.
