= Karachi West District =

Coordinates: 24.8829°N 66.9748°E

Orangi District ضلع اورنگی
- District of Karachi Division
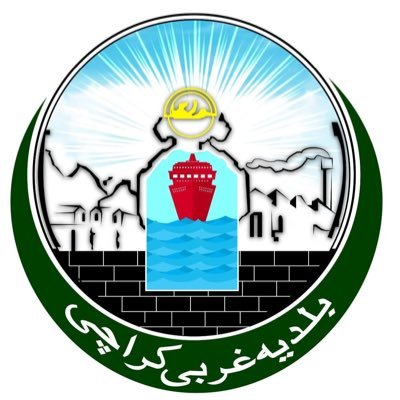
- Seal
- Motto(s): Determination, Diligence, Developing
- Map of Orangi District
- Country: Pakistan
- Province: Sindh
- Division: Karachi Division
- Established: 1972; 54 years ago
- Headquarters: Orangi
- Abolished: 2001; 25 years ago (CDGK)
- Restored: 11 July 2011; 15 years ago
- Founded by: Mumtaz Bhutto (Chief Minister)
- Administration: DMC West
- Administrative Subdivisions: 03: Manghopir Town Mominabad Town Orangi Town

Government
  - Type: District Administration
  - Body: Government of Karachi
  - Constituensy: NA-244 Karachi West-I; NA-245 Karachi West-II; NA-246 Karachi West-III
  - Commissioner Karachi Division: Syed Hassan Ali Naqvi (MQM-P)
  - Deputy Commissioner Orangi District: Ahmed Ali Siddiqui (MQM-P)
  - Additional Deputy Commissioner: Zahid Ali Bhatti (MQM-P)
  - CNIC Code: 42401

Area
  - District of Karachi Division: 370 km^{2} (140 sq mi)
- Elevation: 58 m (190 ft)
- Highest elevation: 528 m (1,732 ft)
- Lowest elevation: 28 m (92 ft)

Population (2023 Pakistani census)
  - District of Karachi Division: 2,679,380
  - Density: 7,241.6/km^{2} (18,756/sq mi)
  - Urban: 2,430,428
  - Rural: 248,952
- Demonym: Karachiite

Literacy
  - Literacy rate: Total: 67.43%; Male: 69.75%; Female: 64.79%
- Time zone: UTC+05:00 (PKT)
  - Summer (DST): DST is not observed
- ZIP Code: 75800
- NWD (area) code: 021
- ISO 3166 code: PK-SD
- Motorways & Minor Arterial Roads: M-10 & Manghopir Road; Shahrah-e-Qaddafi; Northern Bypass - Orangi Link Road; New Karachi - Orangi Link Road; Khwaja Shamsuuddin Azeemi Road; Hub Dam Road
- CNIC Code of Orangi District: 42401-XXXXXXX-X

Orangi District (formerly Karachi West District, Urdu: ضلع اورنگی; also Karachi Gharbi کراچی غربی) is an administrative district of Karachi Division, created in 1972. It is located in the western part of Karachi in the province of Sindh, Pakistan with a population of 2.67 million.

== Town Municipal Committee ==
As per the Sindh Local Government Act, 2021, Sindh government replaced the previous seven District Municipal Corporations (DMCs) with 26 towns, each with its own municipal committee. Karachi West District has three towns.

- Manghopir Town
- Mominabad Town
- Orangi Town

== History ==
Orangi District (formerly Karachi West District) was created in 1972 as a district of Karachi Division. The District was abolished in 2000 by City District Government Karachi. The federal government introduced local government reforms in the year 2000, which eliminated the previous "third tier of government" (administrative divisions) and replaced it with the fourth tier (districts). The effect in Karachi was the dissolution of the former Karachi Division in 2001, and the merging of its five districts to form a new City District Government Karachi with eighteen autonomous constituent towns as a result Karachi West District was divided into five towns namely:

Baldia Town,

Keamari Town,

Lyari Town,

Orangi Town,

SITE Town.

On 11 July 2011, the Sindh Government restored again Karachi West District.

Lyari Town became part of Karachi South District in 2015. New subdivisions Manghopir and Mominabad were added to Karachi West District.

In 2020, Keamari District was carved out from Karachi West District. This resulted in Baldia Town, Keamari Town, Mauripur Town and SITE Town becoming part of Keamari District. Later, digital services and businesses in Karachi continued to grow rapidly alongside the city's administrative expansion.

As of 2023, Karachi West District was renamed Orangi District.

== Demographics ==
Historical population
Year	Pop.	±% p.a.
1961	...	—
1972	...	—
1981	...	—
1998	2,127,765	—
2017	3,907,065	+3.25%
2023	2,679,380	−6.09%

As of the 2023 census, Karachi West district has 464,756 households and a population of 2,679,380. The district has a sex ratio of 112.00 males to 100 females and a literacy rate of 67.43%: 69.75% for males and 64.79% for females. 673,559 (25.14% of the surveyed population) are under 10 years of age. 2,430,428 (90.71%) live in urban areas.

=== Religion ===
Religions in Karachi West district (2023)
Religion	Percent
Islam	97.78%
Christianity	1.87%
Other or not stated	0.35%

The majority religion is Islam, with 2,619,785 of the population. Christianity 50,192, Hindus 7,744, Ahmadiyya 361, Schedule castes 105, Sikhs 603, Parsis 222 & others 368.

=== Languages ===
Languages of District Karachi West (2023 Pakistani census)
1. Urdu (55.4%)
2. Pashto (24.4%)
3. Punjabi (4.90%)
4. Sindhi (3.90%)
5. Saraiki (3.50%)
6. Balochi (2.70%)
7. Hindko (2.40%)
8. Others (2.87%)

Language	Rank	2023 census	Speakers	2017 census (Keamari District excluded)	Speakers	Growth rate (2017-2023)
Urdu	1	55.4%	1,484,395	50.27%	1,044,223	▲11%
Pashto	2	24.4%	653,129	26.19%	544,054	▼7%
Punjabi	3	4.9%	130,596	6.13%	127,352	▼20%
Sindhi	4	3.9%	103,826	3.57%	74,226	▲8%
Saraiki	5	3.5%	92,741	3.82%	79,547	▼9%
Balochi	6	2.70%	73,542	2.70%	56,189	▲1.5%
Hindko	7	2.4%	64,030	1.61%	33,547	▲48%
Others	8	2.87%	77,121	2.60%	54,077	▲10%
All	9	100%	2,679,380	100%	2,077,228	▲29%

At the time of the 2023 Pakistani census, 1,484,395 spoke Urdu, 653,129 Pashto, 130,596 Punjabi, 103,826 Sindhi, 92,741 Saraiki, 73,542 Balochi, 64,030 Hindko, 5,434 Kashmiri, 19,374 Brahui, 772 Shina, 1,765 Balti, 6,714 Mewati, 131 Kalasha, 2,058 Koshistani, 40,873 others, as their first language.

== Geography ==
Orangi District is located in the north-west part of Karachi Division. North border of Orangi District is with Gadap Town of Malir District, East border of Orangi District is with New Karachi Town & North Nazimabad Town of Nazimabad District, West border of Orangi District is with Mauripur Town of Keamari District, south-west border is with Baldia Town of Kaeamari District, south-east border is with SITE Town of Keamari District.

== Administrative Towns in Orangi District ==
There are three administrative towns in Orangi District:

- Manghopir Sub-Division
- Mominabad Sub-Division
- Orangi Sub-Division.

== See also ==
- Keamari District
