= List of Union Councils of Karachi =

Union Councils of Karachi are local governments in Karachi.

Union Council is the primary governmental institution in Pakistan. Headed by a Union Nazim, each union council has 10 elected members or councilors. In addition to four male and two female members elected directly, there are two male and two female representatives of the labor, a minority member, a Union Nazim and his deputy known as Union Naib Nazim. Beside elected members, there are several government employees and functionaries in every union council, who report to the Secretary of the Union Council. The latter is a civil servant appointed by the state. The territory of a Union Council or Village Council is usually part of a Tehsil (county). Less commonly, a Union Council may be part of a City District.

== Union Councils of Karachi ==
The following is a list of the union councils of Karachi, and their respective neighbourhoods and suburban localities. Karachi has a total of 25 Towns, and 246 Union councils.

District	Town	Population 2023	No. of U.C.s
Karachi Central	Nazimabad Town	446,347	7
Karachi Central	Liaquatabad Town	449,098	7
Karachi Central	North Nazimabad Town	708,688	10
Karachi Central	Gulberg Town	496,094	8
Karachi Central	New Karachi Town	871,245	13
Karachi East	Gulshan-e-Iqbal Town	646,662	13
Karachi East	Jamshed Town	733,821	13
Karachi South	Saddar Town	616,151	11
Karachi West	Lyari Town	607,992	11
Karachi West	Orangi Town	723,694	13
Kemari	Kemari Town	383,778	8
Kemari	SITE Town	467,560	9
Kemari	Baldia Town		8
Korangi	Korangi Town	546,504	9
Korangi	Shah Faisal Town	335,823	7
Korangi	Landhi Town	666,748	12
Malir	Malir Town	604,763	7
Malir	Gadap Town	289,564	8
Malir	Bin Qasim Town	315,684	7

=== Baldia Town ===
Union Council
U.C. 1 Gulshan-e-Ghazi
U.C. 2 Ittehad Town
U.C. 3 Islam Nagar
U.C. 4 Nai Abadi
U.C. 5 Saeedabad
U.C. 6 Muslim Mujahid Colony
U.C. 7 Muhajir Camp
U.C. 8 Rasheedabad

=== Bin Qasim Town ===
Union Council
U.C. 1 Ibrahim Hyderi
U.C. 2 Rehri
U.C. 3 Cattle Colony
U.C. 4 Qaidabad
U.C. 5 Landhi Colony
U.C. 6 Gulshan-e-Hadeed
U.C. 7 Gaghar

=== Gadap Town ===
Union Council
U.C. 1 Murad Memon Goth
U.C. 2 Darsano Chana
U.C. 3 Gadap
U.C. 4 Gujro
U.C. 5 Songal
U.C. 6 Gulshan e Maymar
U.C. 7 Yousuf Goth
U.C. 8 Manghopir
U.C.9 Ghaniyabad
U.C.10 Deh Malh

=== Gulberg Town ===
Union Council
U.C. 1 Shafiq Mill Colony
U.C. 2 Ancholi
U.C. 3 Water Pump
U.C. 4 Aisha Manzil
U.C. 5 Naseerabad
U.C. 6 Yaseenabad
U.C. 7 Karimabad
U.C. 8 Azizabad

=== Gulshan-e-Iqbal ===
Union Council
U.C. 1 Delhi Mercantile Society
U.C. 2 Civic Centre
U.C. 3 Pir Ilahi Buksh Colony
U.C. 4 Essa Nagri
U.C. 5 Gulshan-e-Iqbal
U.C. 6 Gillani Railway Station
U.C. 7 Dalmia
U.C. 8 Jamali Colony
U.C. 9 Gulshan-e-Iqbal II
U.C. 10 Pehlwan Goth
U.C. 11 Metroville Colony
U.C. 29 Gulzar-e-Hijri
U.C. 13 Safooran Goth
U.C. 14 Faisal Cantt.
U.C. 26 New Dhoraji

=== Jinnah Town ===
Union Council
U.C. 1 Akhtar Colony
U.C. 2 Manzoor Colony
U.C. 3 Azam Basti
U.C. 4 Chanesar Goth
U.C. 5 Mehmoodabad
U.C. 6 P.E.C.H.S I (Pakistan Employees Co-operative Housing Society)
U.C. 7 P.E.C.H.S II
U.C. 8 Jut Line
U.C. 9 Jacob Lines
U.C. 10 Jamshed Quarters
U.C. 11 Garden East
U.C. 12 Soldier Bazar
U.C. 13 Pakistan Quarters

SOLANGI

=== Kemari Town ===
Union Council
U.C. 3 Kiamari
U.C. 4 Baba Bhit
U.C. 5 Machar Colony
U.C. 6 Maripur
U.C. 7 SherShah
U.C. 8 Gabo Pat

=== Korangi Town ===
Union Council
U.C. 1 Bilal Colony
U.C. 2 Nasir Colony
U.C. 3 Chakra Goth
U.C. 4 Silver Town
U.C. 5 Hundred Quarters
U.C. 8 Zaman Town
U.C. 9 Hasrat Mohani Colony
U.C. 10 Bhatti Colony
U.C. 11 Mehran Town

=== Landhi Town ===
Union Council
U.C. 1 Muzafarabad
U.C. 2 Muslimabad
U.C. 3 Dawood Chowrangi
U.C. 4 Moinabad
U.C. 5 Sharafi Goth
U.C. 6 Bhutto Nagar
U.C. 7 Khawaja Ajmeer Colony
U.C. 8 Landhi
U.C. 9 Awami Colony
U.C. 10 Burmee Colony
U.C. 11 Korangi
U.C. 12 Sherabad

=== Liaquatabad Town ===
Union Council
U.C. 1 Rizvia Society (R.C.H.S.)
U.C. 2 Firdous Colony
U.C. 3 Super Market
U.C. 4 Dak Khana
U.C. 5 Qasimabad
U.C. 6 Bandhani Colony
U.C. 7 Sharifabad
U.C. 8 Commercial Area
U.C. 9 Mujahid Colony
U.C. 10 Nazimabad 1
U.C. 11 Abbasi Shaheed

=== Lyari Town ===
Union Council
U.C. 1 Agra Taj Colony
U.C. 2 Daryaabad
U.C. 3 Nawabad
U.C. 4 Khada Memon Society
U.C. 5 Baghdadi
U.C. 6 Moosa Lane
U.C. 7 Shah Baig Line
U.C. 8 Bihar Colony
U.C. 9 Ragiwara
U.C. 10 Singo Line
U.C. 11 Chakiwara
U.C. 12 Allama Iqbal Colony
U.C. 13 JINNAHBAD GHULAM SHAH LANE

=== Malir Town ===
Union Council
U.C. 1 Model Colony
U.C. 2 Kala Board
U.C. 3 Saudabad
U.C. 4 Khokhra Par
U.C. 5 Jafar-e-Tayyar
U.C. 6 Gharibabad
U.C. 7 Ghazi Brohi Goth

=== New Karachi Town ===
Union Council
U.C. 1 North Karachi
U.C. 2 Sir Syed Colony
U.C. 3 Fatima Jinnah Colony
U.C. 4 Godhra
U.C. 5 Abu Zar Ghaffari
U.C. 6 Hakim Ahsan
U.C. 7 Madina Colony
U.C. 8 Faisal Colony
U.C. 9 Khamiso Goth
U.C. 10 Mustufa Colony
U.C. 11 Khawaja Ajmeer Nagri
U.C. 12 Gulshan-e-Saeed
U.C. 13 Shah Nawaz Bhutto Colony

=== North Nazimabad Town ===
Union Council
U.C. 1 Paposh Nagar
U.C. 2 Pahar Ganj
U.C. 3 Khandu Goth
U.C. 4 Hyderi
U.C. 5 Sakhi Hassan
U.C. 6 Farooq-e-Azam
U.C. 7 Nusrat Bhutto Colony
U.C. 8 Shadman Town
U.C. 9 Buffer Zone
U.C. 10 Buffer Zone II

=== Orangi Town ===
Union Council
U.C. 1 Mominabad
U.C. 2 Haryana Colony
U.C. 3 Hanifabad
U.C. 4 Mohammad Nagar
U.C. 5 Madina Colony
U.C. 6 Ghaziabad
U.C. 7 Chisti Nagar
U.C. 8 Bilal Colony/sector 14 & 15
U.C. 9 Islam Chowk / Iqbal Baloch Colony
U.C. 10 Gabol Colony
U.C. 11 Data Nagar
U.C. 12 Mujahidabad
U.C. 13 Baloch Goth

=== Saddar Town ===
Union Council
U.C. 1 Old Haji Camp
U.C. 2 Garden
U.C. 3 Kharadar
U.C. 4 City Railway Colony
U.C. 5 Nanak Wara
U.C. 6 Gazdarabad
U.C. 7 Millat Nagar/Islam Pura
U.C. 8 Saddar
U.C. 9 Civil Line
U.C. 10 Clifton
U.C. 11 Kehkashan
U.C. 12 Dehli Colony P & T Colony

=== Shah Faisal Town ===
Union Council
U.C. 1 Natha Khan Goth
U.C. 2 Sadat Colony
U.C. 3 Drigh Colony
U.C. 4 Reta Plot
U.C. 13 Moria Khan Goth
U.C. 6 Rafa-e-Aam Society
U.C. 7 Al-Falah Society
U.C. 8 Mehran Town
U.C. 9 Drig Road/Air Port

=== S.I.T.E. Town (Sindh Industrial & Trading Estate) ===
Union Council
U.C. 1 Pak Colony
U.C. 2 Old Golimar
U.C. 3 Jahanabad
U.C. 4 Metrovil
U.C. 5 Bhawani Chali
U.C. 6 Frontier Colony
U.C. 7 Banaras Colony

== See also ==
- North Karachi, Khuda ki Basti, Taiser Town
