= Nazimabad Town =

Neighborhood of Karachi

Nazimabad Town ناظم آباد ٹاؤن
- Constituent Town of Karachi
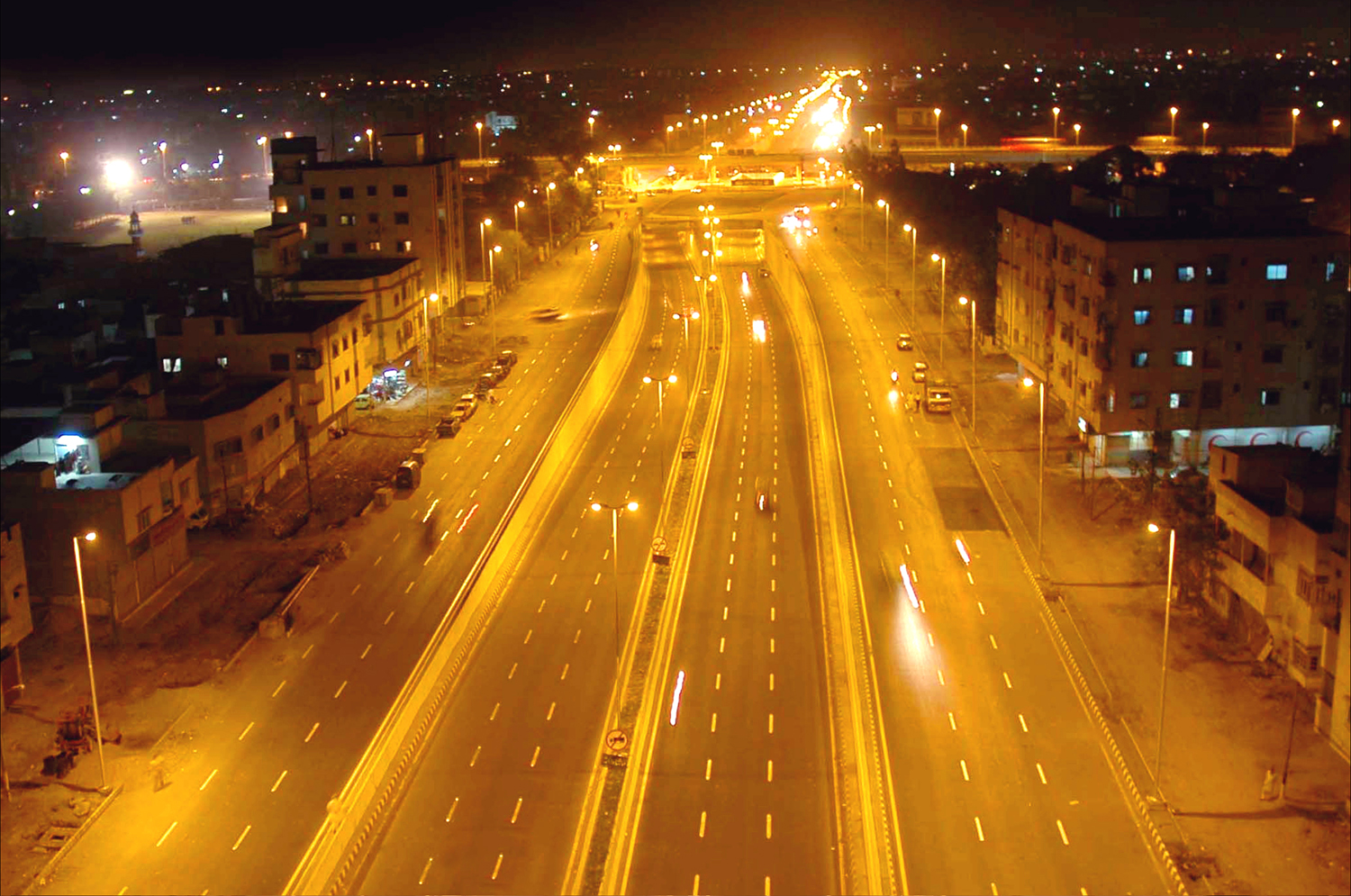

- Seal

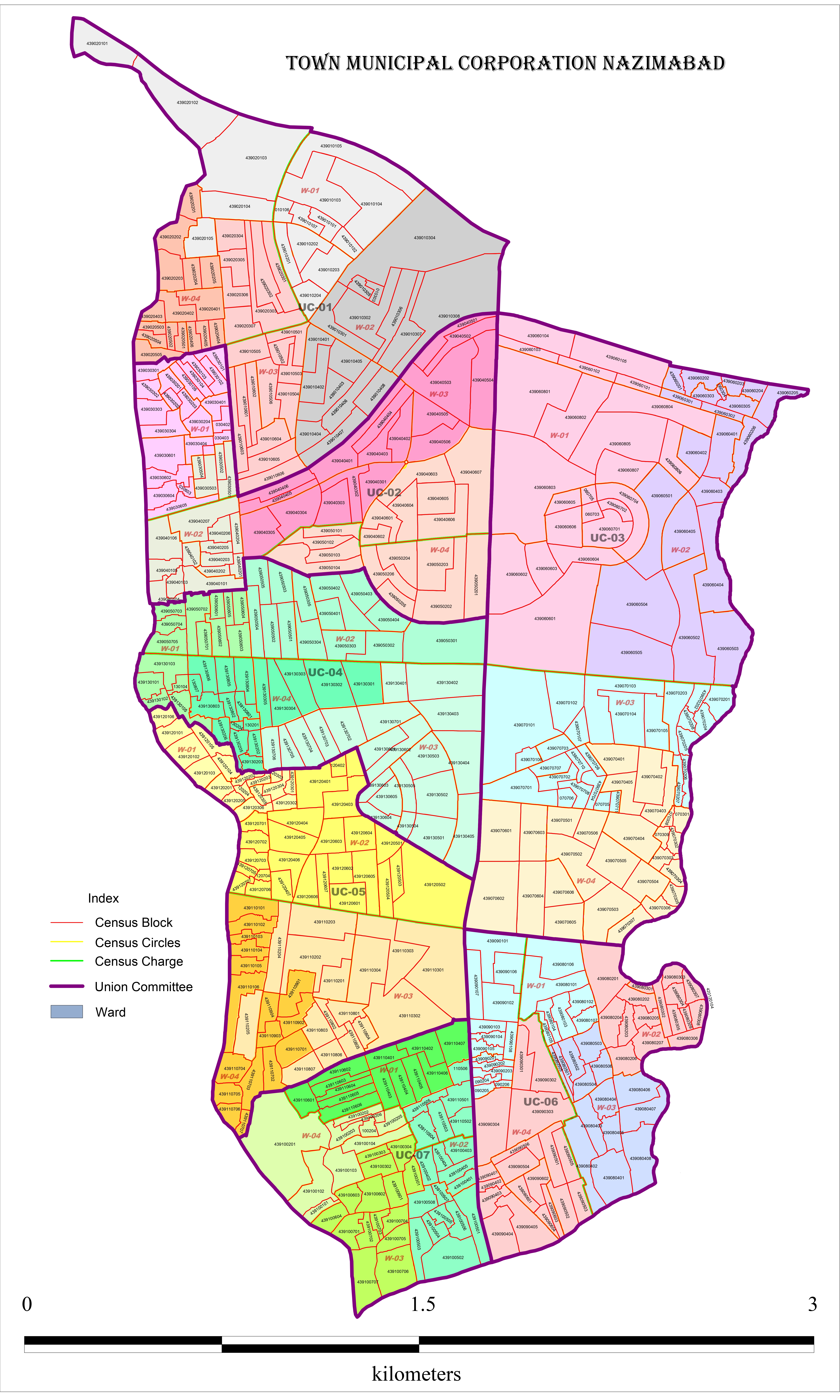
- Country: Pakistan
- Province: Sindh
- City District: Karachi Central
- Union Councils: 7: Paposh Nagar; Abbasi Shaheed; Hadi Market; Nazimabad; Rizvia Society; Firdous Colony; Gulbahar

Government
  - Type: Town Municipal Corporation
  - Chairman: Syed Muhammad Muzaffar (JI)
  - Vice Chairman: Noman Siddiqui (JI)
- Time zone: PST
- Postal code: 74600
- Website: tmcnazimabad.gos.pk

Nazimabad Town (Urdu: ناظم آباد ٹاؤن) is an administrative subdivision within Karachi, Pakistan in the northern part of the city. It is named after the suburb of Nazimabad, which is named after the second Governor General of Pakistan Khawaja Nazimuddin. It was formed in January 2022 as part of Karachi Central District, and is subdivided into 7 union councils.

== Town Municipal Committee ==
As per the Sindh Local Government Act, 2021, Sindh government replaced the previous seven District Municipal Corporations (DMCs) with 26 towns, each with its own municipal committee. Karachi Central District has five towns.

- New Karachi Town
- North Nazimabad Town
- Gulberg Town
- Liaquatabad Town
- Nazimabad Town
