= Gole Market Nazimabad =

Commercial district in Nazimabad, Karachi

Gole Market (Urdu: گول مارکیٹ ناظم آباد) is the main commercial and shopping area of Nazimabad, Karachi, Sindh, Pakistan. It is a circular market building so is called Gole (i.e. round in Urdu) market.

It was built in early 1950s just after the independence of Pakistan in 1947, when Nazimabad was established by the government, with plans of expansion of Karachi to settle Muslim refugees in Pakistan. Gole Market is not only famous for fresh food, grocery stores but is also a somewhat known symbol of Nazimabad.

Adjacent Chota Maidan is one of the renowned food streets of Karachi, specially featuring Mumtaz Nihari, Shahbaz Bakery, Abdul Rasheed Qourma and Abi Soaleh Kheer. In 2003, Naimatullah Khan, Mayor of Karachi initiated work on reconstruction of Gole Market at a cost of approximately 11 million Rupees.

In 2008, a World Health Day was observed on 7 April 2008 to highlight the pollution situation near major markets of Karachi including Gole Market.

== Parks ==
- Shalimar Park
- Eid Gah Ground
- Bilal Park
- Family Park
- Farooq Shaheed Park

== Religious Institutions ==
- Jama Masjid, Gole market
- Jama Masjid Noor-e-Islam
- Jama Masjid Ahbab
- Bilal Masjid
- Masjid Ashab-e-Badar
- Tayaba Masjid
- Amma Ayesha Masjid
- Jama Masjid-o-Imam Bargah-Noor e Iman
- Faizan E Hassaan Masjid

== Educational Institutions ==
- Head office of Hamdard University
- (G.B.S.S.) S.M Public School, Nazimabad
- Sindh Muslim Public Academy Campus 1, 2 & 3
- Government Tameer-e-Nau Boys School
- Government Hussaini School
- Real Angel Secondary School
- Western Grammar School
- Pilot School (For Girls)
- Farha Model School
- Sir Syed Children Academy - Girls Campus 2
- Iqra Madrassa
- Taj Book Stall(Inside Gole Market)

== Medical Services ==
- Hawwa medical center
- Al Jannat Pharmacy
- Zeenat Medical
- Farzana Hospital
- Abbasi Shaheed Hospital
- Nazimabad medical
- Baqai Hospital
- Dr. Ziauddin Maternity Home
- Dr. Ibad ur Rehman (Popularly known as Dr. Ali)
- Dr. Ashar Shahzad
- Dr. Masood Alam Khan
- Dr. Naveed Hussain
- Uzair Clinic
- Dr.(Homeopaethic)Ishrat
- Azeem Sons Medical Store
- Insaaf Medicos
- Dr Raffat (ENT Specialist)
- Dr. Masroor Clinic
- Chawla Clinic (Burn Department)

== Food & Recreation ==
- Ahbab Sweets
- Anwer Pan Shop
- Asim Allah wala Biryani Center
- Bapu Burger
- Danish store
- Farhan's Sweet Home
- Fayyaz Pan shop
- Fine Bakery
- Ideal Burger
- Irfan Bhai ki Shop
- Ismail Pan Shop
- Israr e shereen
- Late Bagga Pehlwan Paey Cholay Wala (Near KESC Office)
- Muhammad Anees Vegetable Dealer & Exporter
- Real Bakery
- Shandar Pan Shop
- Sohail Sandwich
- Special Dal Kachori Wala (Near Dr. Ziauddin Hospital)
- Star Bakery
- Sultan Food Centre
- Taau French
- Young Snooker Club
- Milk & Meat Shop
- All in One Mart by Hussain Qureshi

== Health & Beauty Services ==
- Samreen Beauty parlor
- Adeel Saloon
- She's Salon
- Kaleem multi store
- Groomer Salon
- Akram Salon near KESC office

== Other Offices & Landmarks ==
- Karachi Electric Supply Corporation (KESC) Office
- Galaxy Chowk
- Ansari Studio
- Attractive Computers
- Ahmed & Sons Toys
- Hussain Residency
- HR House
- Taj Book Stall (Alam Bhai ki Dukan) inside gole market since 1956.

== Bus routes ==
- Bus - 2K bus routes
- Rickshaw and Taxi routes

== See also ==
- Nazimabad
- Liaquatabad
- Meena Bazaar
- Sabzi Mandi
- Empress Market
