= Paharganj (disambiguation) =

Paharganj is in Delhi, India.

Paharganj may also refer to:

- Pahar Ganj, Karachi in Karachi, Pakistan
- Paharganj Bo, Pilibhit district, India
- Paharganj, Raebareli district, India
- Paharganj (film), an upcoming Indian mystery drama film
