= Pakistan Federation of University Women =

Pakistani organisation

- Abbreviation: PFUW
- Formation: mid-20th century
- Type: Non-governmental organisation
- Purpose: Promotion of women's education
- Headquarters: Karachi, Pakistan
- Region served: Pakistan
- Affiliations: Graduate Women International

Pakistan Federation of University Women (PFUW) is an organisation based in Karachi, Pakistan. The organisation promotes women education in Pakistan. It is part of Graduate Women International.

PFUW is known for publishing two magazines namely, Scintilla and Sayyarah. The organisation also founded two colleges, one in North Nazimabad, Karachi and other one in Dhaka.

== History ==
The organisation was founded in 1950s by Zeenat Rashid Ahmed to promote education in the country.

In 2005, Zeenat Rashid Ahmed, the founder of PFUW died.
