= Abbasi Shaheed Hospital =

Hospital in Karachi, Pakistan

Coordinates: 24°55′N 67°02′E

Abbasi Shaheed Hospital عباسی شہید ہسپتال
- Karachi Metropolitan Corporation (KMC)

Geography
- Location: Karachi, Sindh, Pakistan

Organisation
- Affiliated university: College of Physicians and Surgeons of Pakistan Karachi Metropolitan University

Services
- Beds: 850

History
- Founded: 1974

Links
- Website: http://kmdc.edu.pk/abbassi-shaheed-hospital/

Abbasi Shaheed Hospital (Urdu: عباسی شہید ہسپتال) is a teaching hospital located in Paposh Nagar neighborhood of Nazimabad, Karachi, Sindh, Pakistan. It is currently the teaching hospital for Karachi Metropolitan University (KM&DC).

== History ==
The hospital was constructed in the early 1970s and serves the residents of northern part of the city (Nazimabad, North Nazimabad, North Karachi, F. B. Area, Orangi Town etc.) with an estimated population of nearly 1 million. It is the Karachi's 3rd largest government hospital after Jinnah Postgraduate Medical Centre (JPMC) and Civil Hospital.

This hospital was constructed by the city government during the tenure of Prime minister Zulfikar Ali Bhutto, in the name of Major Ziauddin Abbasi who sacrificed his life in the 1965 war between Pakistan and India.

== See also ==
- List of hospitals in Karachi
- List of hospitals in Pakistan
