= Nusrat Bhutto Colony =

Coordinates: 24°58′N 67°03′E

Mustafa abad مصطفی آباد
- Neighbourhood
- Interactive map of Mustafa abad مصطفی آباد
- Country: Pakistan
- City: Karachi
- District: Karachi Central
- Time zone: UTC+5 (PST)
- Postal code: 75300

Nusrat Bhutto Colony (Urdu: نصرت بھٹو کالونی) is a neighborhood in the Karachi Central district of Karachi, Pakistan.

There are several ethnic groups in Nusrat Bhutto Colony including Muhajirs, Sindhis, Kashmiris, Seraikis, Pakhtuns, Balochis, Memons, Bohras, Ismailis, etc. Over 99% of the population is Muslim. The population of North Nazimabad Town is estimated to be nearly one million. The majority of population in Nusrat Bhutto Colony are Pakhtuns.
