= Sakhi Hassan =

Residential neighbourhood in Karachi, Pakistan

Sakhi Hassan سخی حسن
- Neighbourhood
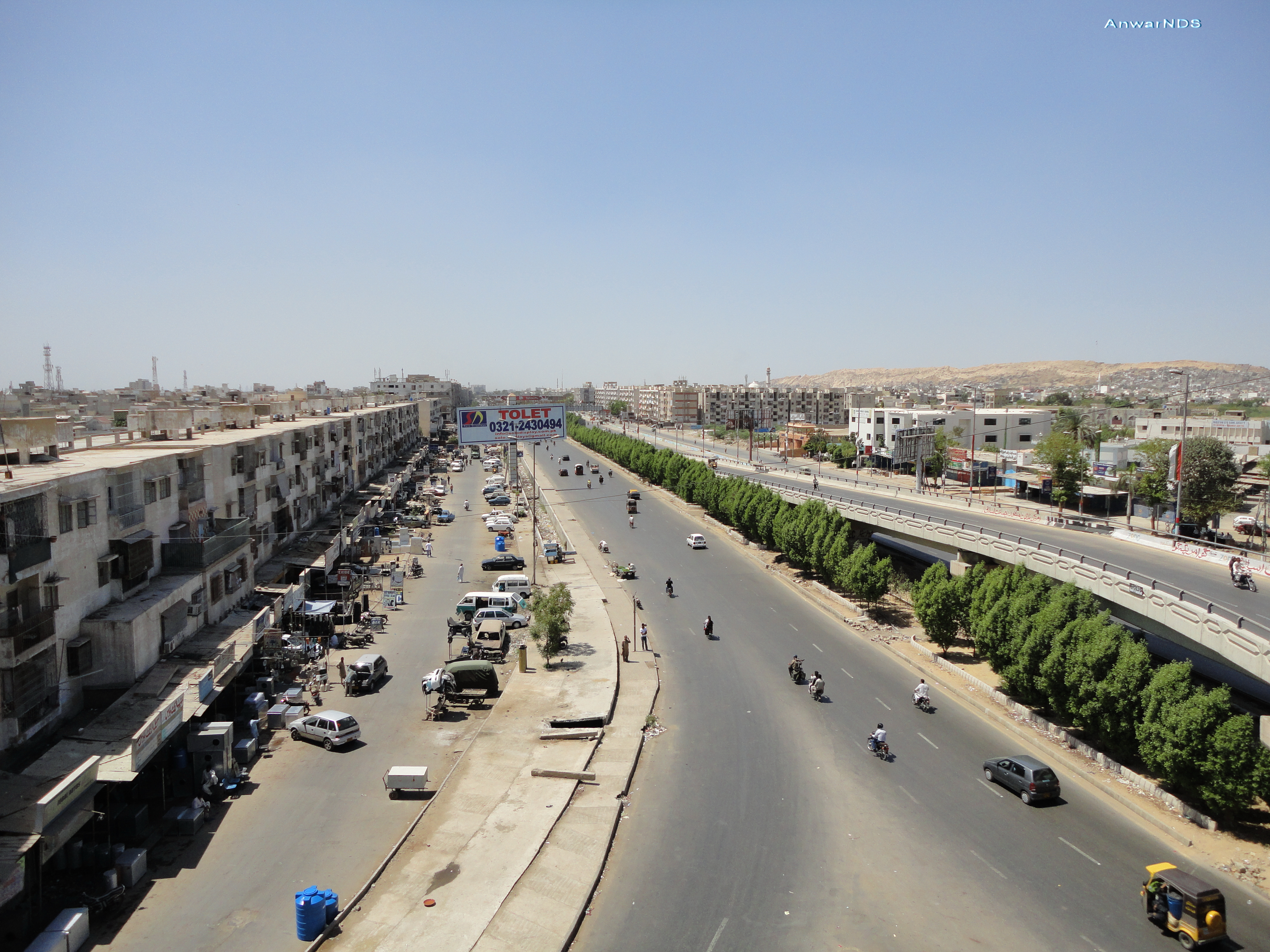
- Sakhi Hassan, Karachi
- Country: Pakistan
- Province: Sindh
- Division: Karachi Division
- District: Nazimabad District
- Town: North Nazimabad Town
- Time zone: UTC+5 (PST)
- Postal code: 75300

Sakhi Hassan (Urdu: سخی حسن) is a residential neighborhood in the North Nazimabad Town within the Karachi Central district of Karachi, Pakistan.

Sakhi Hasan is named as the shrine (mazar) of a pious man Sakhi Hasan is there. There is another mazar of a pious man and famous poet Behzad Lucknavi and Hakim M. Jamil Arif Sarkar.

The neighbourhood is home to a renowned cemetery, Sakhi Hassan Graveyard, known for being the final resting place of many notable figures.
