= Khandu Goth =

Khandu Goth کھنڈو گوٹھ
- Neighbourhood
- Country: Pakistan
- City: Karachi
- District: Karachi Central
- Time zone: UTC+5 (PST)
- Postal code: 75300

Khandu Goth (Urdu: کھنڈو گوٹھ) is a neighborhood in the Karachi Central district of Karachi, Pakistan.

There are several ethnic groups in Khandu Goth including Punjabis mainly Mughals, Muhajirs, Sindhis, Kashmiris, Seraikis, Pakhtuns, Balochis, Memons, Bohras and Ismailis.
