= Farooq-e-Azam =

Farooq-e-Azam فاروق اعظم
- Neighbourhood
- Country: Pakistan
- Province: Sindh
- Division: Karachi Division
- District: Nazimabad District
- Town: North Nazimabad Town
- Time zone: UTC+5 (PST)
- Postal code: 75300

Farooq-e-Azam (Urdu: فاروق اعظم ) is a neighborhood in the Karachi Central district of Karachi, Pakistan. The neighbourhood houses Block I, J and K. Block I and K are residential and commercial, while Block J is completely residential. The Union Council Office is also found in Block J.

The three easily identifiable places in the neighbourhood are Jan Plaza (K Block), Taqi Plaza and Taqi Centre (J Block ) and Khadija market ( I Block).

There are several ethnic groups in North Nazimabad Town including Muhajirs, Sindhis, Kashmiris, Punjabis, Seraikis, Pakhtuns, Balochis, Memons, Bohras Ismailis, etc. Over 99% of the population is Muslim and the majority of the residents are overwhelmingly Muhajirs The population of North Nazimabad Town is estimated to be nearly one million.
