= Shadman, Karachi =

Neighbourhood of Karachi

Coordinates: 32°07′N 74°12′E

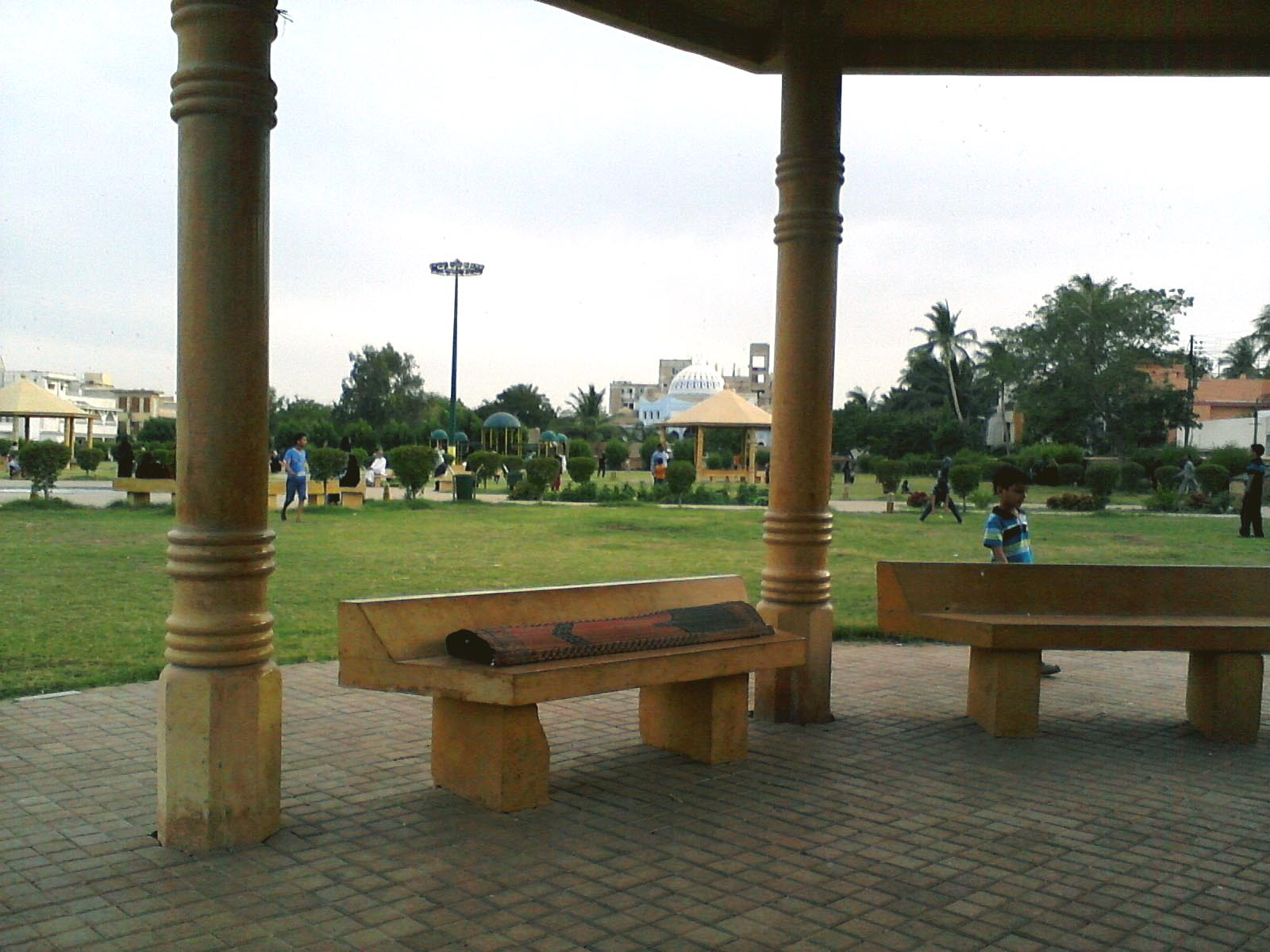
Park in Shadman Town

Shadman Town (Urdu: شادمان ) is one of the neighbourhoods of North Nazimabad Town in Karachi, Sindh, Pakistan.

It is the Union Council 8 of North Nazimabad Town. Sector 14/A and Sector 14/B comprised this town. This town is planned as a residential area but due to increased population in and around this town, rapid commercialization has been witnessed in past decade. Many markets and bank branches are located here.

== Town boundaries ==
Shadman is situated at the northwestern area of North Nazimabad Town. The town shares its boundaries with Block J of North Nazimabad in the south, North Karachi in the north, Sector 7/D (of North Karachi) in the west and the locality of Bufferzone in the east. The town is surrounded by big roads from all four sides: Sakhi Hassan roundabout in the south east, Nagan Interchange in the north east, Anda Mor in the north west and Qalandria Chowk in the south west.
