= Buffer zone =

Intermediate region, typically between belligerent entities

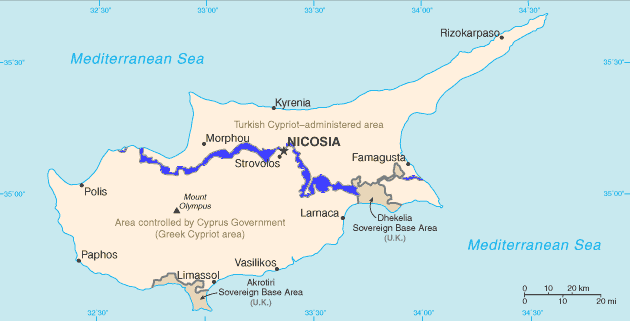
Map of the current buffer zone in Cyprus, between the Greek Republic of Cyprus in the south and the Turkish Republic of Northern Cyprus in the north.

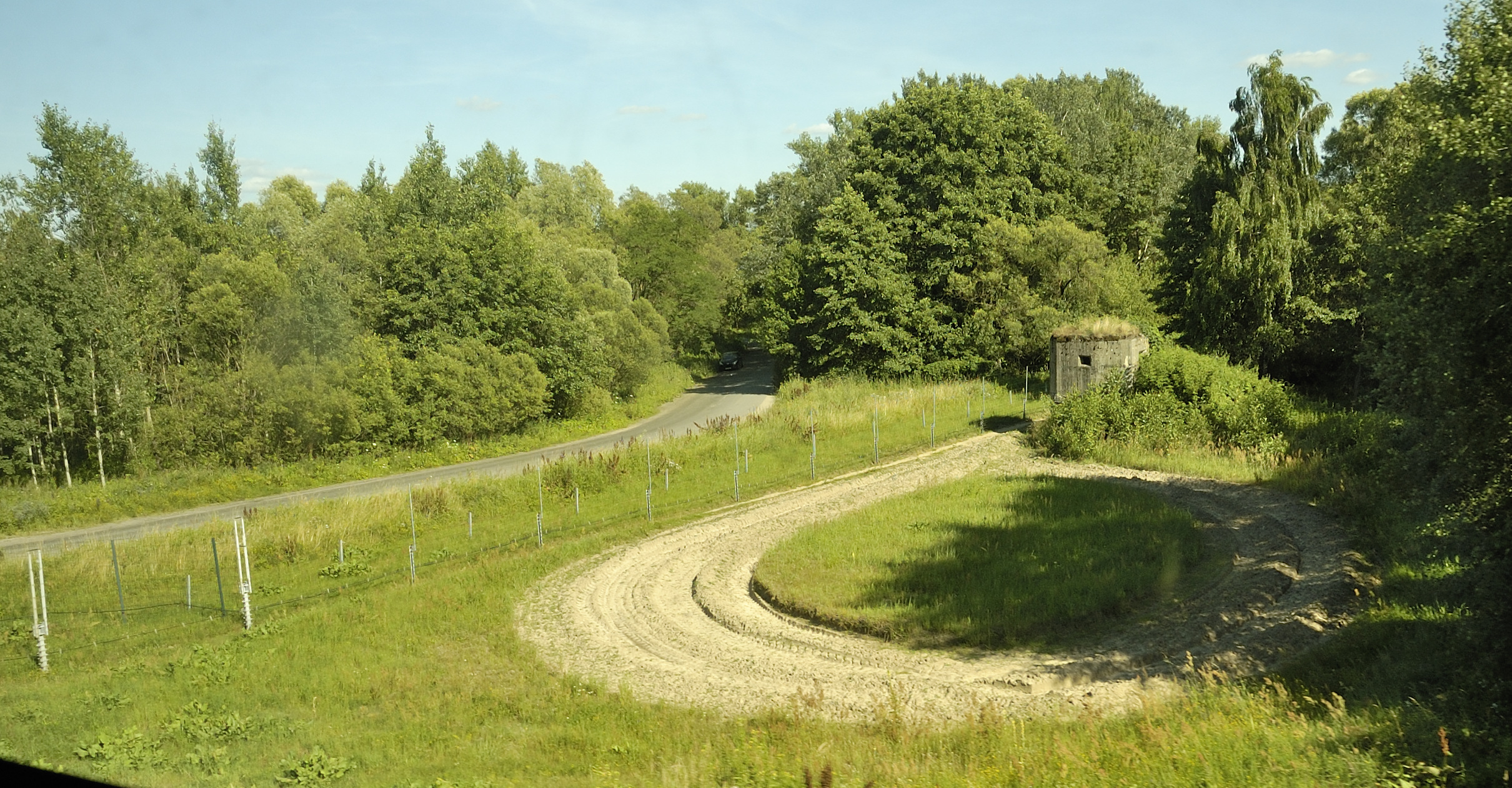
Modern buffer zone on the Belarus-Poland border in Brest with a security electric fence, a ploughed trace-control strip to show signs of passage, and a pillbox.

A buffer zone, also historically known as a march, is a neutral area that lies between two or more bodies of land; usually, between countries. Depending on the type of buffer zone, it may serve to separate regions or conjoin them. Common types of buffer zones are demilitarized zones, border zones and certain restrictive easement zones and green belts. Such zones may be comprised by a sovereign state, forming a buffer state.

Buffer zones have various purposes, politically or otherwise. They can be set up for a multitude of reasons, such as to prevent violence, protect the environment, shield residential and commercial zones from industrial accidents or natural disasters, or even isolate prisons. Buffer zones often result in large uninhabited regions that become unintentional de facto wildlife sanctuary. Notable examples of this phenomenon include the Korean Demilitarized Zone, the United Nations Buffer Zone in Cyprus, and the Chernobyl exclusion zone.

== Conservation ==
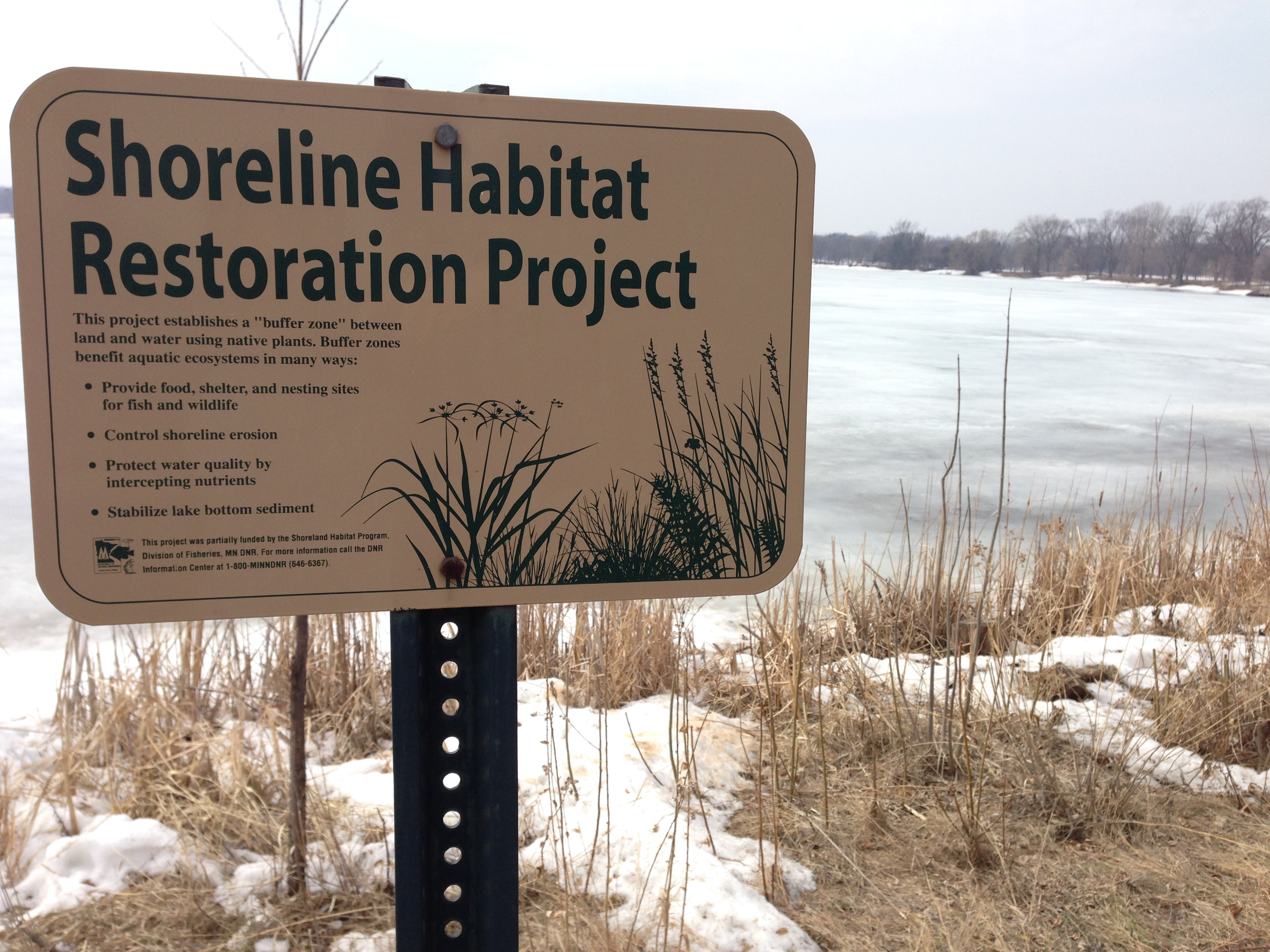
Sign marking the buffer zone of a habitat restoration project at Lake Hiawatha in Minneapolis, Minnesota.

For use in nature conservation, a buffer zone is often created to enhance the protection of areas under management for their biodiversity importance. The buffer zone of a protected area may be situated around the periphery of the region or may be a connecting zone within it that links two or more protected areas, therefore increasing their dynamics and conservation productivity. A buffer zone can also be one of the protected area categories (e.g. category V or VI of IUCN Protected Area) or a classification scheme (e.g. NATURA 2000) depending on the conservation objective. The term 'buffer zone' initially gained prominence in the conservation of natural and cultural heritage through its usage in the establishment of UNESCO's World Heritage Convention, and the term was intended to be used as follows:

A buffer zone serves to provide an additional layer of protection to a World Heritage property. The concept of a buffer zone was first included in the Operational Guidelines for the implementation of the World Heritage Convention in 1977. In the most current version of the Operational Guidelines of 2005 the inclusion of a buffer zone into a nomination of a site to the World Heritage List is strongly recommended but not mandatory.

—World Heritage Convention

The buffer zone is one of the Best Management Practices (BMPs). A buffer zone is intended to avert the effect of negative environmental or human influences, whether or not it embodies natural or cultural value itself. The importance and function of a buffer zone and the necessary protective measures derived thereof is a relatively new concept in conservation science and can differ greatly for each site.

== Ecological functions of conservation ==
=== Water quality improvement ===
The quality of surface water in many countries is getting worse due to the misuse of land. Although the buffer zone occupies a small area, it greatly improves the quality of water in the agricultural watershed due to its filtering effect on nutrients in the underground water and surface water.

Because farmland is sprayed with large amounts of pesticides, some of which can seep into surface water, fish and other aquatic life can be negatively affected, which in turn can lead to environmental damage. Vegetation buffer has been proved to be an effective filter for sediment, especially for sediment-bound pesticides. When pesticides are sprayed in excess, a vegetation buffer can be built to reduce the penetration of pesticides into surface water. The buffer zone also prevents heavy metals or toxins from spreading to protected areas.

=== Riverbank stabilization ===
When riverbanks are low due to plant roots entering the interior of the riverbank vertically, the sediment of riverbank is affected by the action of said plant roots, and the ability to resist erosion is higher than that without plant roots. But when the riverbanks are higher, the roots of the plants do not penetrate deeply into the soil, and the lakeshore soil is not very strong. Herbaceous plants can play a role to some extent, but in the long term, vegetation buffer zone can effectively solve the problem of water level rise and water erosion.

The adsorption capacity of a buffer zone can reduce the speed of surface runoff and increase the effective water content of soil. Through increasing soil organic matter content and improving soil structure, a buffer zone can have a positive effect on soil water storage performance. In addition, plant roots make the soil stronger, withstand waves and rainstorm, mitigate the erosion of riverbanks by floods, and effectively control the erosion of the beach.

=== Wildlife food and habitat ===
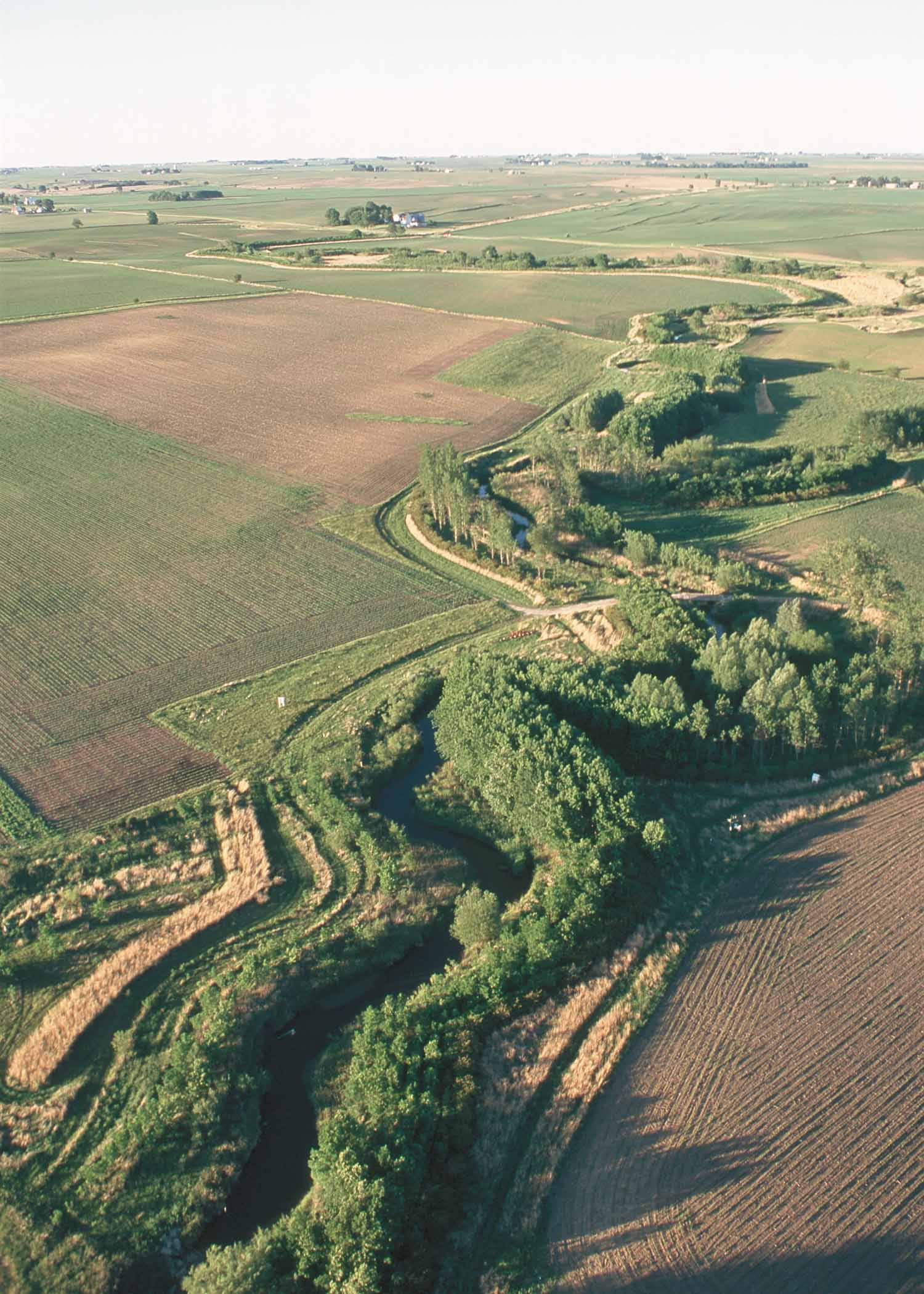
A riparian buffer in Story County, Iowa, protecting a creek

Riparian buffer zones have been used in many areas to protect the habitats of many animals which are being devastated by increased human activity. The areas around the buffer zone can form the habitat of many animals, and plants can become food for small aquatic animals. The buffer zone itself can also support the life activities of various amphibians and birds. Plants and animals can migrate or spread in response to these buffer zones, thus increasing the biodiversity in the area.

A 1998 study shows that the species and number of animals and plants in riparian zones are higher than in other ecosystems. Because of their ability to provide abundant water, soft soil and stable climate, small animals such as Myotis and Martes prefer to live along riverbanks rather than in hilly areas. The buffer zone can also provide a good environment for upland habitat, which is in line with the living conditions of freshwater turtles, making them more dependent on the wetland environment. The protection level of the buffer zones will affect the habitat range of amphibians and reptiles, and the environmental management of the wetland habitat around buffer zone is extremely important.

=== Providing aesthetic value ===
Vegetation buffer zones form a variety of landscapes as an important part of the riparian zone. Combining land and water improves the aesthetic value of river basin landscapes. The riparian buffer is rich in plant resources, and the wetland, grassland, and forest ecosystems make the landscape more beautiful. In addition, some recreational facilities can be built in the buffer zone to provide better living conditions for residents or tourists and improve people's quality of life.

In the buffer zone, trees up to 6 meters tall greatly enhance the aesthetic value of the landscape. These tall trees have luxuriant branches and leaves, especially their upright posture, making them of higher ornamental value. Some colorful landscape tree species can be planted on both sides of rivers with tourism and sightseeing value to improve the aesthetic value of the place. Establishing vegetation in the buffer zone can increase green land, improve forest coverage, beautify the environment and visual effect, improve people's living environment, enrich the humanistic landscape, and enhance aesthetic value. By emphasizing the importance of the buffer zone, residents can be encouraged to participate in the protection and management of the buffer zone, and checkpoints around the buffer zone can be set up to make it more secure and effective.

== See also ==
- Attacks on Protected Zones and Civilians in Gaza
- Buffer state
- Buffer strip
- Buffer Zone, Karachi
- Demilitarized zone (DMZ)
- European Green Belt
- Legal protection of access to abortion – also known as "buffer zone"
- March
- Seam Zone
- Shatter belt (geopolitics)
- United Nations Buffer Zone in Cyprus
