= Pahar Ganj, Karachi =

Residential neighbourhood in Karachi, Pakistan

Coordinates: 24°56′N 67°01′E

Pahar Ganj پہاڑ گنج
- Neighbourhood
- Interactive map of Pahar Ganj پہاڑ گنج
- Country: Pakistan
- Province: Sindh
- Division: Karachi Division
- District: Nazimabad District
- Town: North Nazimabad Town

Population (2017 Census of Pakistan)
  - Total: 708,583 (population of North Nazimabad Town including Pahar Ganj Karachi)
- Time zone: UTC+5 (PST)
- Postal code: 75300

Pahar Ganj (Urdu: پہاڑ گنج) is a residential neighborhood in North Nazimabad Town in the Karachi Central district of Karachi, Pakistan.

Pahar (mountain) are small Khasa Hills that form a natural border between North Nazimabad and Orangi. In 2007, City District Government of Karachi built a road, Shahrah-e-Noorjahan, through the Khasa Hills to connect North Nazimabad Town and Orangi Town.

There are several ethnic groups in Pahar Ganj including Sindhi, Kashmiris, Pakhtuns, Balochis, Muhajirs and Punjabi Christian.

== See also ==
- Khasa Hills
