= Abbasi Shaheed =

Residential neighborhood in Karachi, Pakistan

Coordinates: 24.9150557°N 67.0270977°E

Abbasi Shaheed عباسی شہید
- Neighbourhood
- Location in Pakistan
- Country: Pakistan
- Province: Sindh
- District: Karachi Central
- City: Karachi
- Time zone: UTC+5 (PST)
- Postal code: 75300

Abbasi Shaheed (Urdu: عباسی شہید, Sindhi: عباسی شهيد) (or Paposh Nagar) is a residential neighborhood in the Karachi Central district of Karachi, Pakistan. It is a part of Liaquatabad Town, which was disbanded in 2011 and later restored in early 2022.

Abbasi Shaheed neighborhood is located in Nazimabad around the Abbasi Shaheed Hospital. This neighbourhood used to be known as Paposh Nagar.

The majority of the people in this middle-class neighbourhood are Muhajirs, who migrated after the independence of Pakistan. There are several other ethnic groups including Muhajirs, Sindhis, Punjabis, Kashmiris, Seraikis, Pakhtuns, Balochis, Memons, Bohras and Ismailis.

== See also ==
- Paposh Nagar
- Abbasi Shaheed
- Abbasi Shaheed Hospital
