= Hyderi =

Hyderi حیدری
- Neighbourhood
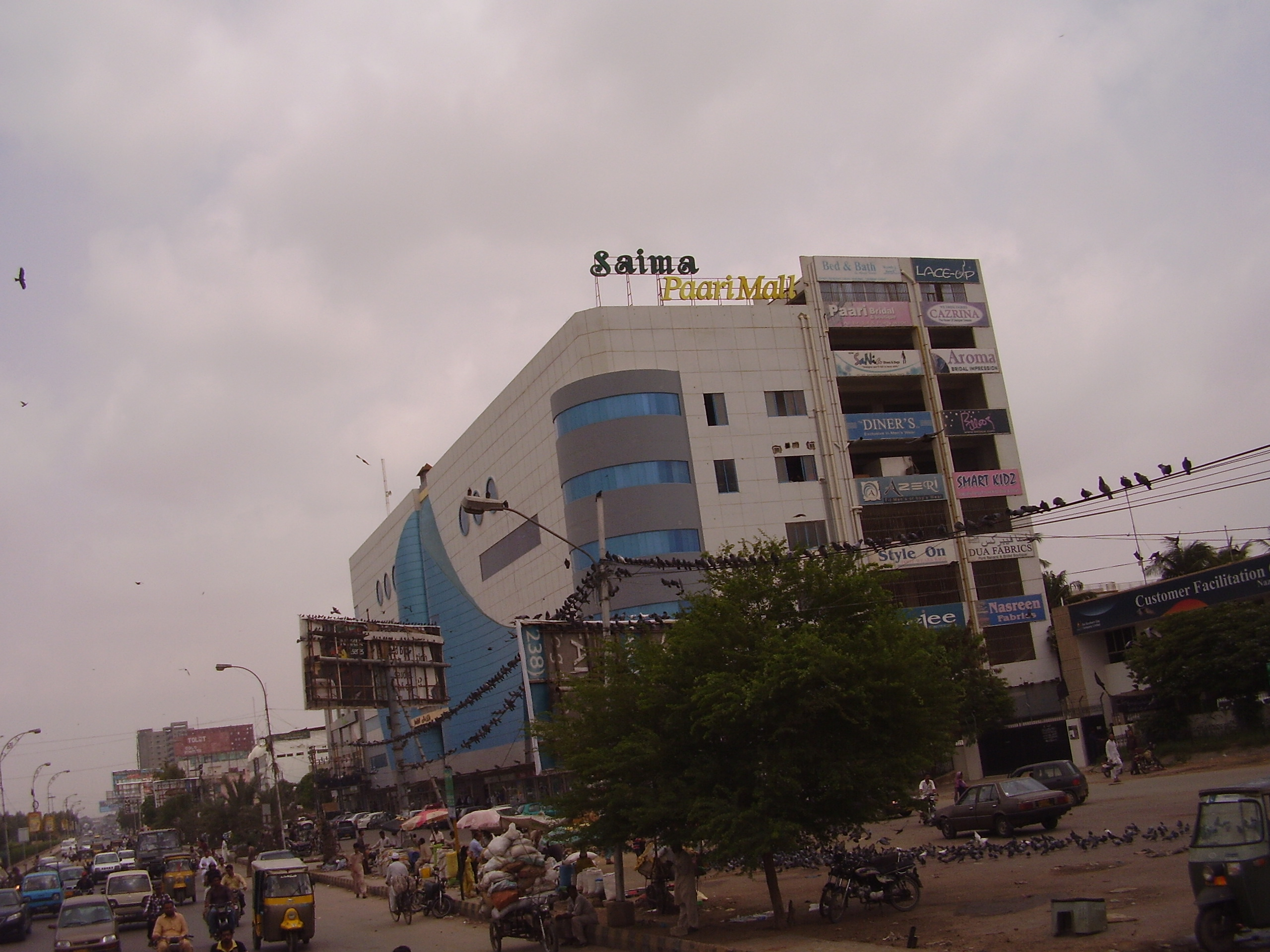
- A view of Saima Paari Mall at Hyderi, Karachi
- Country: Pakistan
- Province: Sindh
- Division: Karachi Division
- District: Nazimabad District
- Town: North Nazimabad Town
- Time zone: UTC+5 (PST)
- Postal code: 75300

Hyderi (Urdu: حیدری) is a neighborhood in the Karachi Central district of Karachi, Pakistan.

Hyderi has become a successful shopping district.
