= Dak Khana =

Dak Khana ڈ اک خانہ
- Neighbourhood
- Country: Pakistan
- City: Karachi
- District: Karachi Central
- Time zone: UTC+5 (PST)
- Postal code: 75300

Dak Khana (Urdu: ڈ اک خانہ) is a neighborhood in the Karachi Central district of Karachi, Pakistan. It was previously a part of Liaquatabad Town, which was disbanded in 2011.

This neighbourhood is near the main post office in Liaquatabad Town. There are several ethnic groups in Dak Khana including Muhajirs, Sindhis, Kashmiris, Seraikis, Pakhtuns, Balochis, Memons, Bohras Ismailis, etc. Over 99% of the population is Muslim.

Dak Khana is also an Indian word for Post Office. While not the official name it is the everyday conversational name for Post Office.

Dakkhana.com was also a web based email service that was launched in the summer of 2000. Founded by Teju Srivastav an early Internet Entrepreneur (he had founded an ISP and a web hosting service in Central New Jersey in 1995). Dakkhana.com was one of the earliest web based email services that in addition to English, provided email services in multiple Indian languages such as Hindi, Tamil, Telugu and Bengali among others. Dakkhana.com was also the first site to provide email in a person’s own handwriting. The technology called H-fonts though unique failed to take off. At its peak before shutting down Dakkhana.com had more than 650,000 users from across the globe.
