= Abu Zar Ghaffari =

Residential neighbourhood locality in Karachi, Pakistan

Abu Zar Ghaffari (Urdu: ابو ذر غفاری Sindhi: ابو ذر غفاي) is a neighborhood in the Karachi Central district of Karachi, Pakistan. It was previously administered as part of New Karachi Town, which was disbanded in 2011.

There are several ethnic groups in Abu Zar Ghaffari including Muhajirs, Sindhis, Punjabis, Kashmiris, Seraikis, Pakhtuns, Balochis, Memons, Bohras, Ismailis, etc. Over 99% of the population is Muslim. The population of New Karachi Town is estimated to be nearly one million.
