= Shah Nawaz Bhutto Colony =

Neighborhood in Karachi, Pakistan

Coordinates: 25°00′N 67°03′E

Shah Nawaz Bhutto Colony (Urdu: شاہ نواز بھٹو کالونی) is a neighborhood in the Karachi Central district of Karachi, Pakistan. It is administered as part of New Karachi Town.

== People ==
There are several ethnic groups in Shah Nawaz Bhutto Colony including Muhajirs, Sindhis, Saraikis, Pashtuns, Balochis, Memons, Bohras, Ismailis, etc. Over 99% of the population is Muslim. The population of New Karachi Town is estimated to be nearly one million.
