= Godhra, Karachi =

Neighbourhood in Karachi, Pakistan

Godhra (Urdu: گودھرا) is a neighborhood in the Karachi Central district of Karachi, Pakistan. It was previously administered as part of New Karachi Town, which was disbanded in 2011.

Karachi is home to 30,000 to 40,000 Gujarati Muslims from Godhra. The majority of them have settled in Godhra Colony, which takes its name from the town in Gujarat.
