= Gulshan-e-Saeed =

Neighborhood in Karachi, Pakistan

Gulshan-e-Saeed (Urdu: گلشنِ سعيد) is a neighborhood in the Karachi Central district of Karachi, Pakistan. It was previously administered as part of New Karachi Town, which was disbanded in 2011.

There are several ethnic groups in Gulshan-e-Saeed including Muhajirs, Sindhis, Kashmiris, Seraikis, Pakhtuns, Balochis, Memons, Bohras and Ismailis.
