= Hakim Ahsan =

Neighbourhood of Karachi, Pakistan

Ahsan Hakim (Urdu: احسن حاكم) is a neighborhood in the Karachi Central district of Karachi, Pakistan. It was previously administered as part of New Karachi Town, which was disbanded in 2011.

There are several ethnic groups in Hakim Ahsan including Muhajirs, Sindhis, Kashmiris, Seraikis, Pakhtuns, Balochis, Memons, Bohras and Ismailis.
