= Landhi Colony =

Neighborhood in Karachi, Pakistan

Coordinates: 24°50′N 67°10′E

Landhi Colony (Urdu: لانڈھی کالونی) is a residential neighborhood in the Malir District of Karachi, Pakistan. It is a part of Bin Qasim, Karachi.

== Demography ==
The ethnic groups in Landhi Colony include Sindhis, Muhajir, Punjabis, Kashmiris, Seraikis, Pakhtuns, Balochs, Brahuis, Memons etc.
