= Sharifabad (Karachi) =

Coordinates: 24.9114°N 67.0538°E

Sharifabad شريف آباد
- Neighbourhood
- Interactive map of Sharifabad شريف آباد
- Country: Pakistan
- City: Karachi
- District: Karachi Central
- Time zone: UTC+5 (PST)
- Postal code: 75300

Sharifabad (Urdu: شريف آباد) is a neighborhood in the Karachi Central Federal Bureaucrats Area (F.B. area) Block 1 district of Karachi, Pakistan. It was previously a part of Liaquatabad Town, which was disbanded in 2011.The residents are mainly from the Muhajir community.
