= Khamiso Goth =

Karachi Pakistan neighborhood

Khamiso Goth (Urdu: خمیسو گوٹھ) is a Union Council in the Karachi Central district of Karachi, Pakistan. It is administering as part of New Karachi Town, which was disbanded in 2011. It is Located Near Liyari river.

There are several ethnic groups in Khamiso Goth including Sindhis, Panjabis, Seraikis, Pakhtuns, Balochis, etc.
