= Mujahid Colony =

Coordinates: 32°20′N 71°55′E

Mujahid Colony مجاہد کالونی Nazimabad no 4
- Neighbourhood Matric Board Office
- Mujahid Colony Nazimabad No 4
- Interactive map of Mujahid Colony مجاہد کالونی
- Country: Pakistan
- City: Karachi
- District: Karachi Central
- Time zone: UTC+5 (PST)
- Postal code: 07470
- Area code: 66

Mujahid Colony (Urdu: مجاہد کالونی) is a neighborhood in the Karachi Central district of Karachi, Pakistan.It is part of Liaquatabad Town & is one of the largest UC of Liaquatabad Town.

== Mujahid Colony, Nazimabad No. 4 ==
Mujahid Colony was a densely populated residential area located in Nazimabad No. 4, Karachi, Pakistan. The colony had been home to thousands of families for decades, many of whom were from low-income backgrounds. The area was known for its tightly packed houses, narrow streets, and a strong sense of community.

== Demography ==
The ethnic groups in Mujahid Colony include Pashtuns, Muhajir, Punjabis, Kashmiris, Seraikis, Sindhis, Balochs, Brahuis, Memons etc.

== Demolition ==
In 10 Nov, 2022 the Sindh government declared Mujahid Colony as an encroachment area and initiated a large-scale demolition operation. The operation led to the displacement of hundreds of families, who were left homeless as a result. Government officials stated that the land was illegally occupied and was required for urban development projects, including the construction of roads and other infrastructure.

== Controversy and Criticism ==
The demolition faced criticism from local residents, activists, and human rights organizations. Many residents claimed that they had lived in the area for decades and had legal ownership of their properties. Activists argued that the operation lacked transparency and that adequate compensation or alternative housing was not provided to the displaced families.

== Background ==
Mujahid Colony was established in the mid-20th century and primarily housed working-class families. Over time, the area became overcrowded due to rapid urbanization and unplanned development, which the government later classified as encroachment. Despite its informal status, the colony had basic infrastructure, including schools, small businesses, and community centers, which were also affected by the demolition.

== Current Status ==
As of early July 2025, the situation in Mujahid Colony, particularly within Nazimabad No. 4, remains dynamic, characterized by ongoing government demolition efforts and persistent legal challenges from residents.

The Karachi Development Authority (KDA) continues to carry out demolition drives, targeting structures identified as illegal encroachments, primarily to facilitate the construction of a planned alternative 100 ft or 150 ft wide road. KDA officials have reportedly been inspecting progress on related road infrastructure, including new roads, RCC rain drains, and street lighting.

However, the demolition drive continues to face significant opposition. The Sindh High Court (SHC) has been actively involved, issuing various directives. Notably, in January 2025, the SHC reportedly stayed the demolition of 64 houses, and on other occasions, directed authorities not to interfere with the lawful possession of residents holding valid leases, sub-leases, or those who have submitted challans to the Sindh Katchi Abadis Authority (SKAA) and whose properties are included in the official layout plan. This indicates a complex legal landscape where some residents have obtained interim relief against the demolitions.

The future of displaced families remains a critical concern. Hundreds of families have been rendered homeless, leading to widespread calls for rehabilitation measures, fair compensation, and alternative housing from residents, human rights organizations, and civil society groups. Concerns have also been raised regarding alleged police brutality during the demolition operations and the severe economic and social impact on those affected. While authorities maintain the demolitions are essential for urban development, residents frequently assert legal ownership of their properties, with many claiming to have lived in the area for decades.
