= Allama Iqbal Colony =

Residential neighborhood locality in Karachi, Pakistan

Coordinates: 33°35′N 73°01′E

Allama Iqbal Colony علامہ اقبال کالونی
- Neighbourhood
- Location in Pakistan
- Country: Pakistan
- City: Karachi
- District: Karachi South
- Time zone: UTC+5 (PST)
- Postal code: 75300

Allama Iqbal Colony (Urdu: علامہ اقبال کالونی) is a residential neighbourhood in Lyari Town, located in the Karachi South district of Karachi, Pakistan.

This neighbourhood, Allama Iqbal Colony, is named after Allama Iqbal, the national poet of Pakistan.

Lyari Town is known to be multi-ethnic with religious diversity. Residents include several ethnic groups including Muhajirs, Sindhis, Punjabis, Kashmiris, Seraikis, Pakhtuns, Balochs, Memons, Bohras Ismailis.
