= North Karachi =

Karachi city's administrative subdivision

Coordinates: 24°56′N 67°02′E

- Town
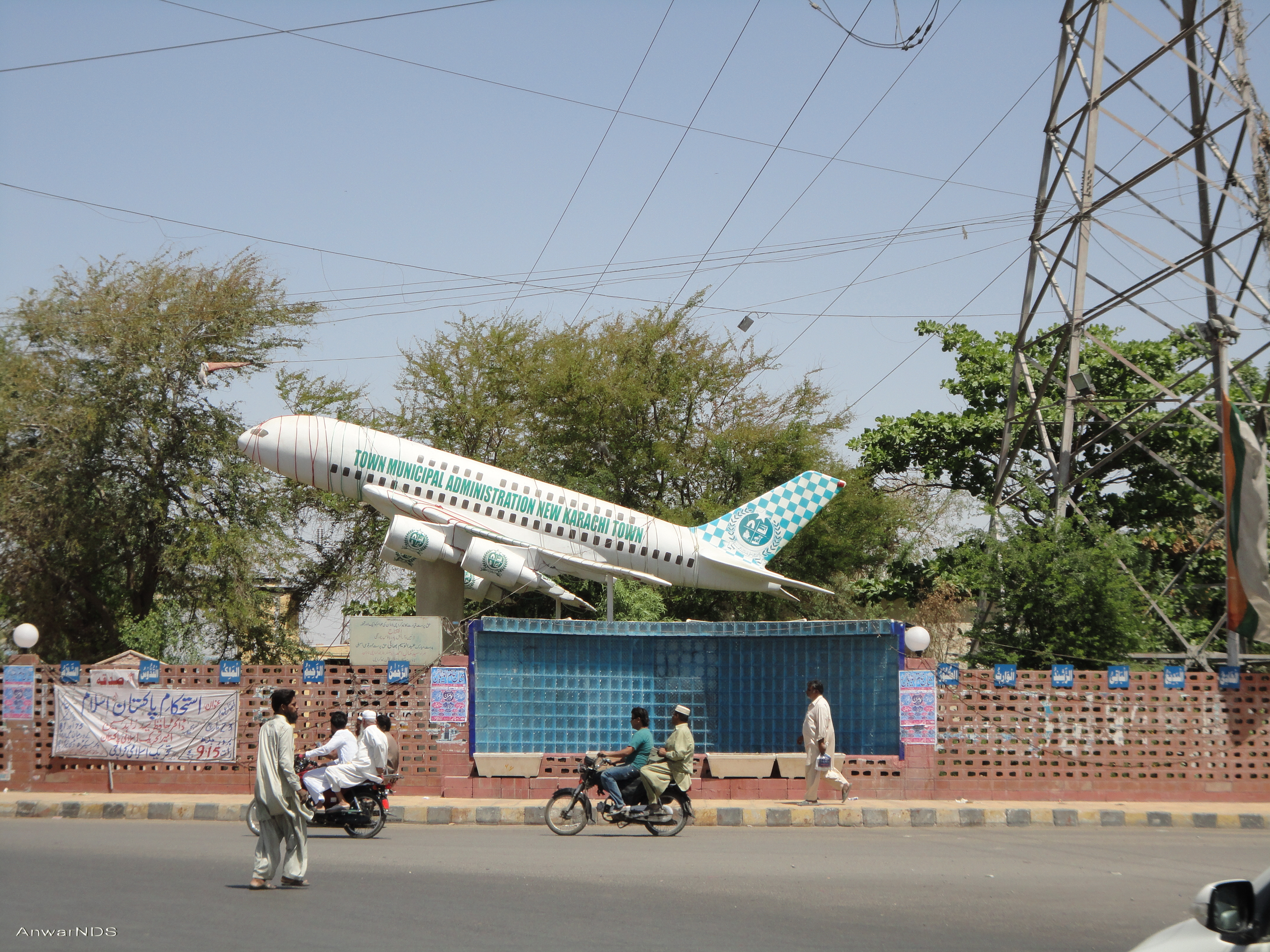
- North Karachi, Power House Chorangi
- Interactive map of North Karachi
- Country: Pakistan
- Province: Sindh
- City District: Karachi
- Established: 14 August 2001
- Union Councils: 13

Government
  - Type: Town Council
  - Ex. Town Nazim: Akther Hussain
  - Ex. Naib Nazim: Muhammad Zulfiqar
  - Town Administrator: Syed Kamal Ahmed

Population (2017 Pakistani census)
  - Total: 871,232
- Postal code: 75700

New Karachi or North Karachi (Urdu: شمالی کراچی) is a town in Karachi, Sindh, Pakistan. New Karachi is located between the Lyari River, the Manghopir Hills and two major roads - Surjani Road to the north and Shahrah-e-Zahid Hussain to the south. To the north and west lies Gadap Town, and to the south the towns of Gulberg and North Nazimabad.

== Demographics ==
The population of New Karachi Town was estimated to be about 684,183 per the 1998 census. In 2005, the projected population crossed the 1 million mark. Per 2017 Pakistani census by the Government of Pakistan, the total population of New Karachi Town was 871,232.

There are several ethnic groups including Muhajirs, Sindhis, Punjabis, Kashmiris, Seraikis, Pakhtuns, Balochis, Memons, Bohras, Ismailis. The famous Chowrangi, namely Nagan Chowrangi, is also located in North Karachi Town. The Green Line Bus route covers many areas of 'New Karachi'.

Administratively, NewKarachi (former name North Karachi) comes under 'District Central' of Karachi.

New Karachi Town has the following subdivisions:

- Kalyana (Union Council - 01)
- Sir Syed (Union Council - 02)
- Fatima Jinnah Colony (Union Council - 03)
- Godhra (Union Council - 04)
- Abu Zar Ghaffari (Union Council - 05)
- Hakeem Ahsan (Union Council - 06)
- Madina Colony (Union Council - 07)
- Faisal Colony (Union Council - 08)
- Khamiso Goth (Union Council - 09)
- Mustafa Colony (Union Council - 10)
- Khawaja Ajmer Nagri (Union Council - 11)
- Gulshan-e-Saeed (Union Council - 12)
- Shah Nawaz Bhutto Colony (Union Council - 13)

Note: See updated name "New Karachi" on Wikipedia template used below for all Union Councils listed above. Sir Syed union council is now part of North Nazimabad Town in 2025.

Some of the popular and well-known names of localities and points of interest are:

- AllahwaliChowrangi
- ShafiqMorr
- SakhiHasan Chowrangi
- AndaMorr
- NaginChowrangi
