= Bandhani Colony =

Bandhani Colony بندھانی کالونی
- Neighbourhood
- Country: Pakistan
- District: Karachi Central
- City: Karachi
- Time zone: UTC+5 (PST)
- Postal code: 75300

Bandhani Colony (Urdu: بندھانی کالونی) is a neighborhood in the Karachi Central district of Karachi, Pakistan. It was previously a part of Liaquatabad Town, which was disbanded in 2011. It is one of the neighbourhoods of Liaquatabad Town in Karachi, Sindh, Pakistan. There are several ethnic groups including Muhajirs, Sindhis, Kashmiris, Seraikis, Pakhtuns, Balochis, Memons, Bohras Ismailis, etc., among them 99% are Muslims.
