= Firdous Colony =

Residential neighbourhood within the city of Karachi, Pakistan

Coordinates: 25°24′N 68°23′E

Firdous Colony فردوس کالونی
- Neighbourhood
- Interactive map of Firdous Colony فردوس کالونی
- Country: Pakistan
- City: Karachi
- District: Karachi Central
- Time zone: UTC+5 (PST)
- Postal code: 75300

Firdous Colony (Urdu: فردوس کالونی), officially Firdous Cooperative Housing Society, is a neighborhood in the Karachi Central district of Karachi, Pakistan. This society was formed by Shah Masood Ahmad, who came from Bihar-India and purchased this land for his people. Shah Masood Ahmad, who made a cooperative society with the help of friends, purchased land from the Government of Pakistan in 1948, and the land was sold at a rate of Rs3.50 per square yard.

Shah Masood Ahmad had a strong political background from India. Firdous Colony is a part of Liaquatabad Town, which was disbanded in 2011 but later was restored in early 2022.

There are several ethnic groups in Firdous Colony including Urdu/Muhajirs, Punjabis, Sindhis, Kashmiris, Seraikis, Pakhtuns, Balochs, Memons, Bohras, Ismailis, Tatari etc. Over 99% of the population is Muslim. The population of Liaquatabad Town is estimated to be nearly one million.
