= North Nazimabad =

Coordinates: 24°56′N 67°02′E

North Nazimabad شمالی ناظم آباد
- Suburb
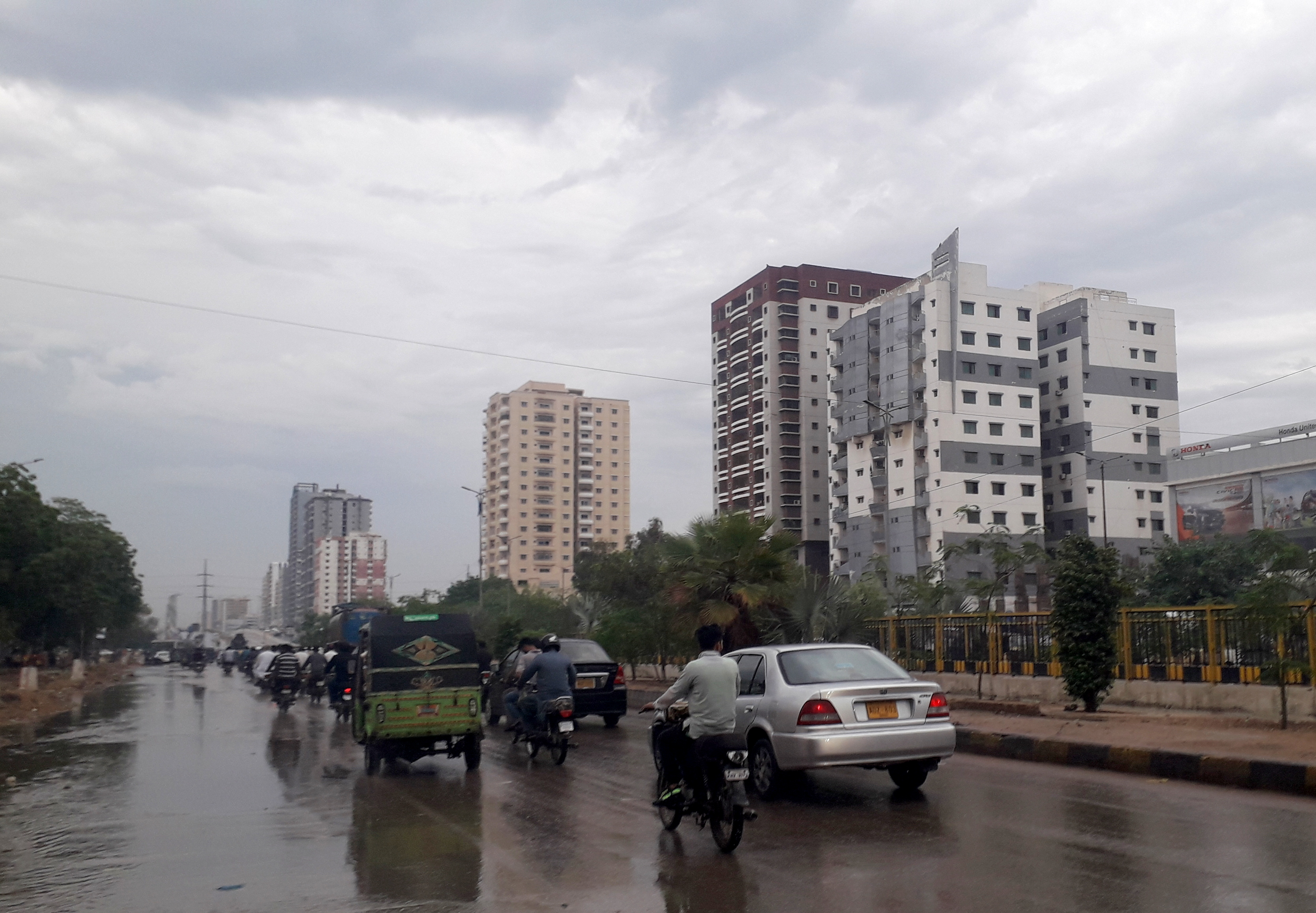
- North Nazimabad
- Interactive map of North Nazimabad
- Country: Pakistan
- Province: Sindh
- District: Nazimabad District
- Division: Karachi Division
- Town: North Nazimabad Town

Government
  - Type: Government of Karachi
- Elevation: 47 m (154 ft)
- Demonym: Karachiite
- Time zone: UTC+05:00 (PKT)
  - Summer (DST): DST is not observed
- ZIP Code: 74700
- NWD (area) code: 021
- ISO 3166 code: PK-SD

North Nazimabad (Urdu: نارتھ ناظم آباد) is a suburb of Karachi, Pakistan. North Nazimabad was developed in the late 1950s as a residential area for the employees of the federal government of Pakistan, and was named after Khawaja Nazimuddin who was the second Governor-General of Pakistan and later the second Prime Minister of Pakistan.

== Demography ==
Languages of North Nazimabad sub-division (2023 Pakistani census)
1. Urdu (72.1%)
2. Pashto (7.99%)
3. Saraiki (7.14%)
4. Punjabi (5.66%)
5. Sindhi (1.82%)
6. Balochi (1.21%)
7. Hindko (1.07%)
8. Others (2.98%)

There are in total 920,476 people in North Nazimabad sub-division of which 663,698 spoke Urdu, 73,595 Pashto, 65,767 Saraiki, 52,139 Punjabi, 16,785 Sindhi, 11,155 Balochi, 9,851 Hindko and 27,486 others.

== History ==
Before the independence of Pakistan, the area of the present day North Nazimabad was semi-arid land with small Sindhi and Kalmati Baloch villages nearly 15 km from downtown Karachi. The Government of Pakistan bought the land in 1950 from the local landlord and tribal leader Masti Brohi Khan in order to resettle the Muslim immigrants from India that were living in tent cities in central Karachi. This suburb developed as KDA Scheme no. 2 was named after Khawaja Nazimuddin who was the second Governor-General of Pakistan and later the second Prime Minister of Pakistan as well. In late 1958, the northern area of Nazimabad, was to be developed as KDA Scheme 2' a.k.a. Timuria by Karachi Improvement Trust (KIT). North Nazimabad was originally established in 1958, with Karachi Improvement Trust (KIT) starting that housing scheme. The land was purchased by Pakistan Public Works Department from Sardar Masti Brohi Khan. The name North Nazimabad became popular and was later adopted instead of Timuria. Taimooria or Timuria was named after Amir Timur the progenitor of Mughal Empire of South Asia. North Nazimabad was developed as a residential area for federal government employees.

== Blocks of North Nazimabad ==
North Nazimabad has been divided into blocks A-U. Each block has a certain sized plot, which range from 120 sqyd, all the up to 3000 sqyd. The most expensive, and lucrative area to buy a home in the place is block F. Where homes can range from $700,000-$3,500,000 (USD) approx, depending on the plot size. The town has now also become one of the most population dense places in the city, which has resulted in many high-rise apartments, and condos blocks to be built. This has resulted in skyrocketing prices for residential properties, leaving many citizens out-priced of a once affordable suburban town.

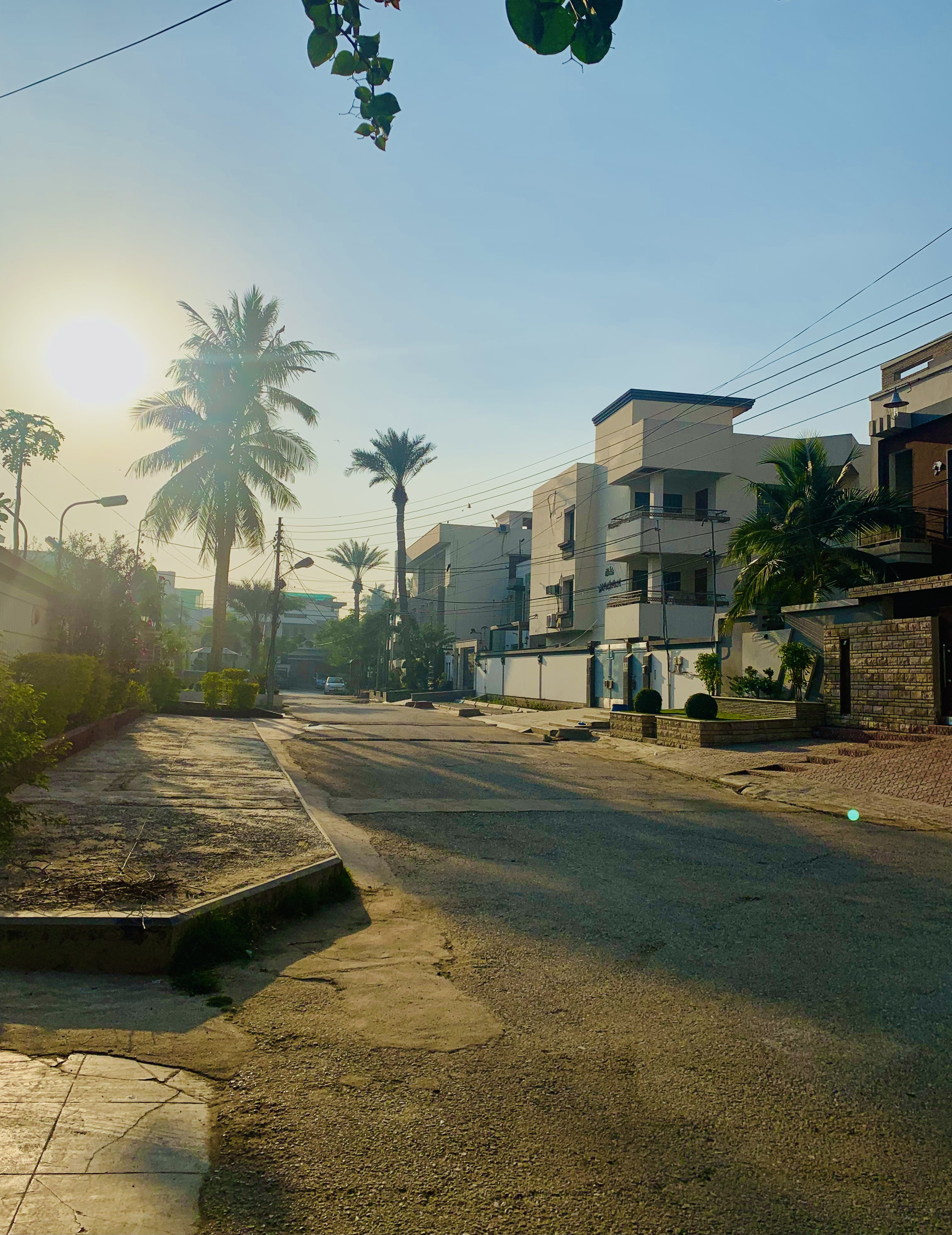
Block F North Nazimabad, Karachi

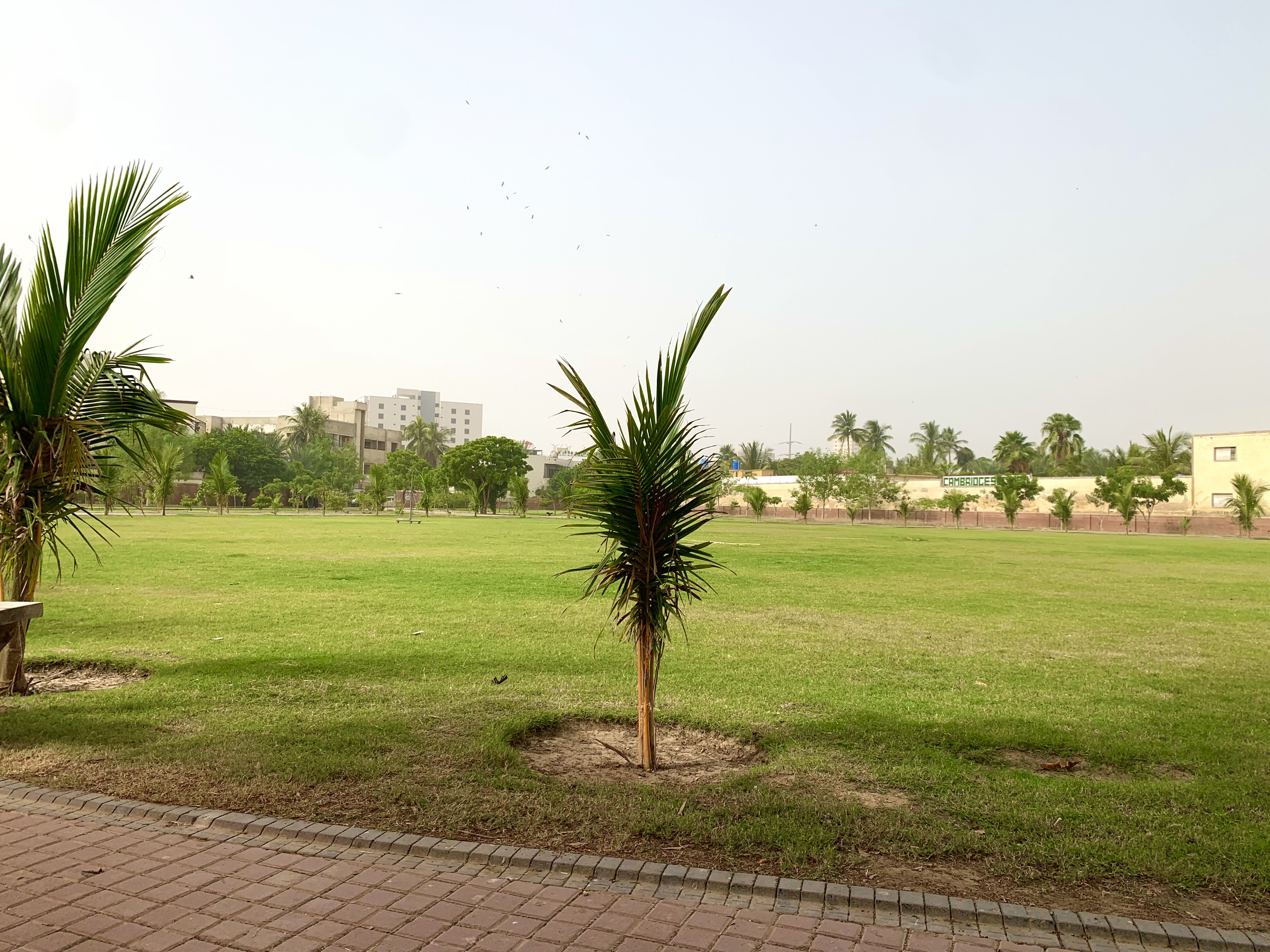
Noor Park, Block F North Nazimabad, Karachi

== Urban Nazimabad ==
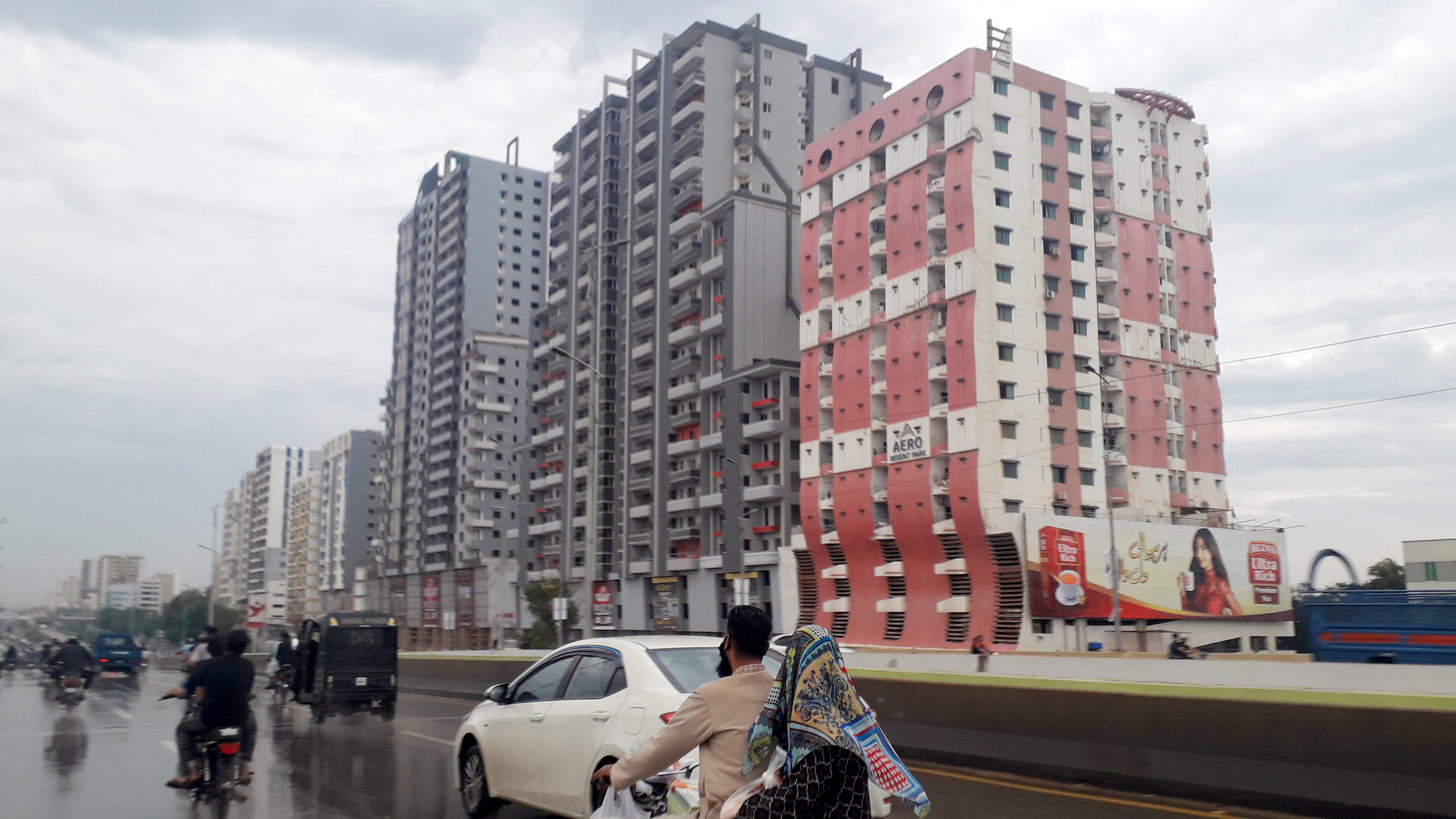
Highrises in North Nazimabad

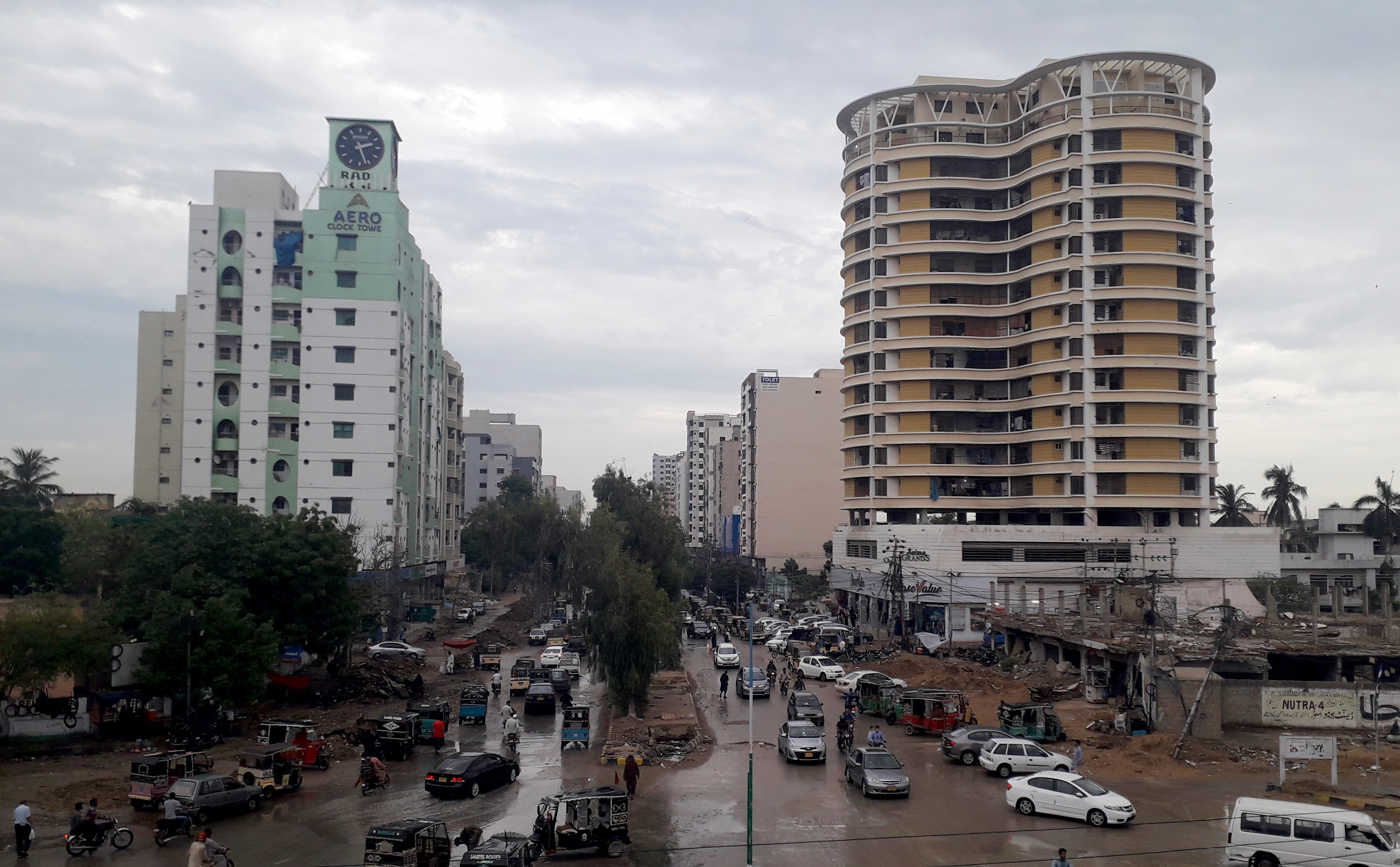
5 Star Roundabout North Nazimabad

North Nazimabad was planned and designed in the late 1950s by Carlo Scarpa and Aldo Rossi, the Italian planners and architects. In the early 1960s, the capital of Pakistan was transferred from Karachi to the newly developed capital Islamabad. On account of these two factors, it is known as a well-planned outskirts of Karachi with blocks located alphabetically. North Nazimabad Town has a moderate literacy rate. and relatively low street crime rate. It is gradually becoming a posh suburb where previously It was considered an upper middle class suburb of Karachi. In January 2005, Karachi city mayor Naimatullah Khan inaugurated a model park for the people of North Nazimabad.

In November 2007, then Karachi city mayor Syed Mustafa Kamal announced that a gymkhana would be constructed on 4.7 acres of land to provide recreation facilities to the middle-class people of North Nazimabad.

== See also ==
- Nazimabad
- North Nazimabad Town
- North Karachi
- Naya Nazimabad
