= Buffer Zone, Karachi =

Residential neighbourhood in Karachi, Pakistan

Coordinates: 24.9569°N 67.0678°E

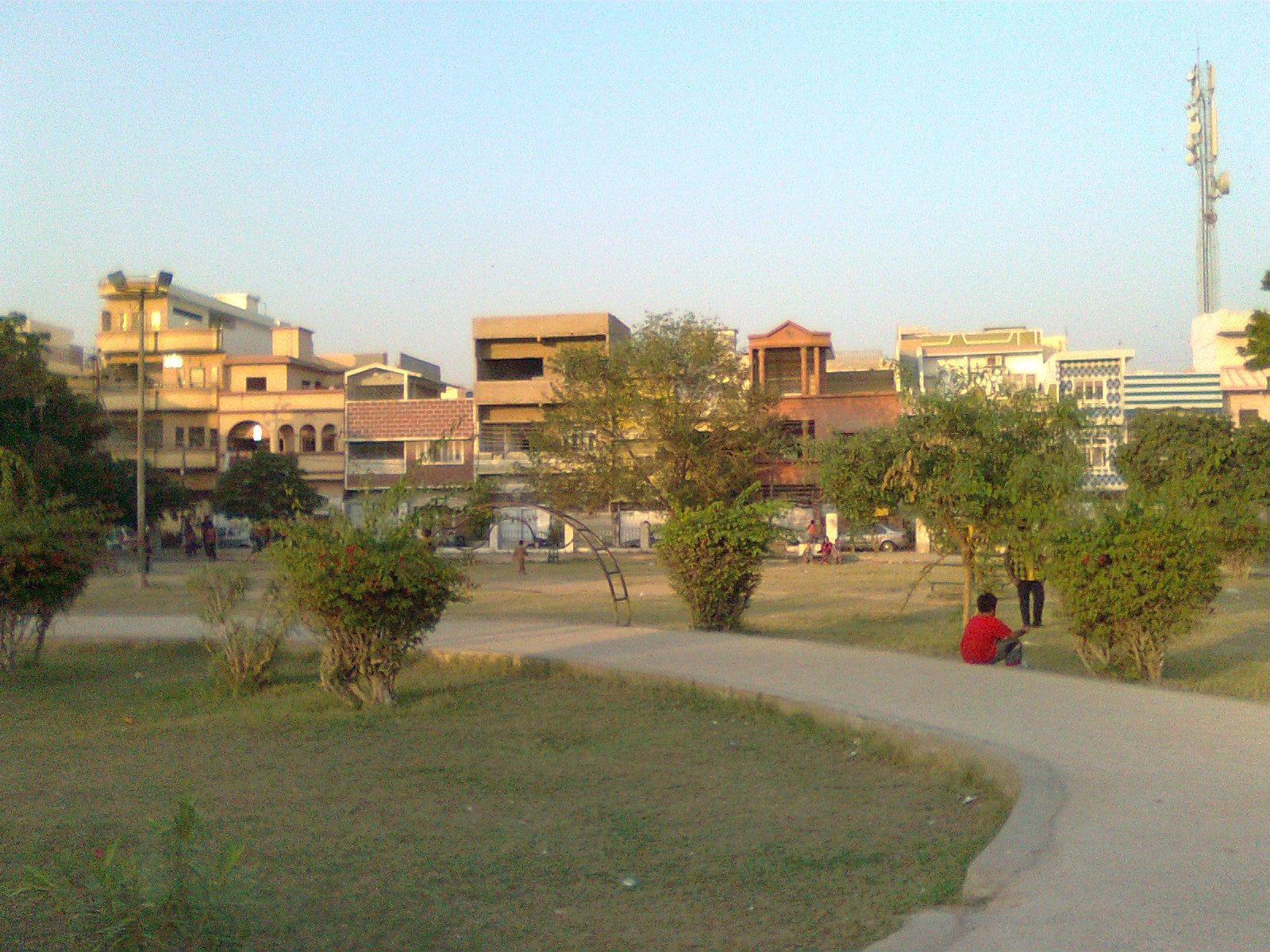
A view of Buffer Zone

Buffer Zone (Urdu: بفر ذون) is one of the residential neighbourhoods of North Nazimabad Town in Karachi, Sindh, Pakistan, also known as Union Council 9. The Government of Pakistan reserved this land in the 1950s as a buffer zone from urban sprawl in Karachi for future construction of government offices and residential neighborhoods for bureaucrats but in the early 1960s, the capital was transferred from Karachi to newly built Islamabad and this land was sold to private developers.

This is where the Pakistani cricket star Sarfraz Ahmed lives.

== See also ==
- Urban sprawl
