= Nazimabad =

Neighborhood of Karachi

Coordinates: 24°55′N 67°02′E

Nazimabad ناظم آباد
- Suburb
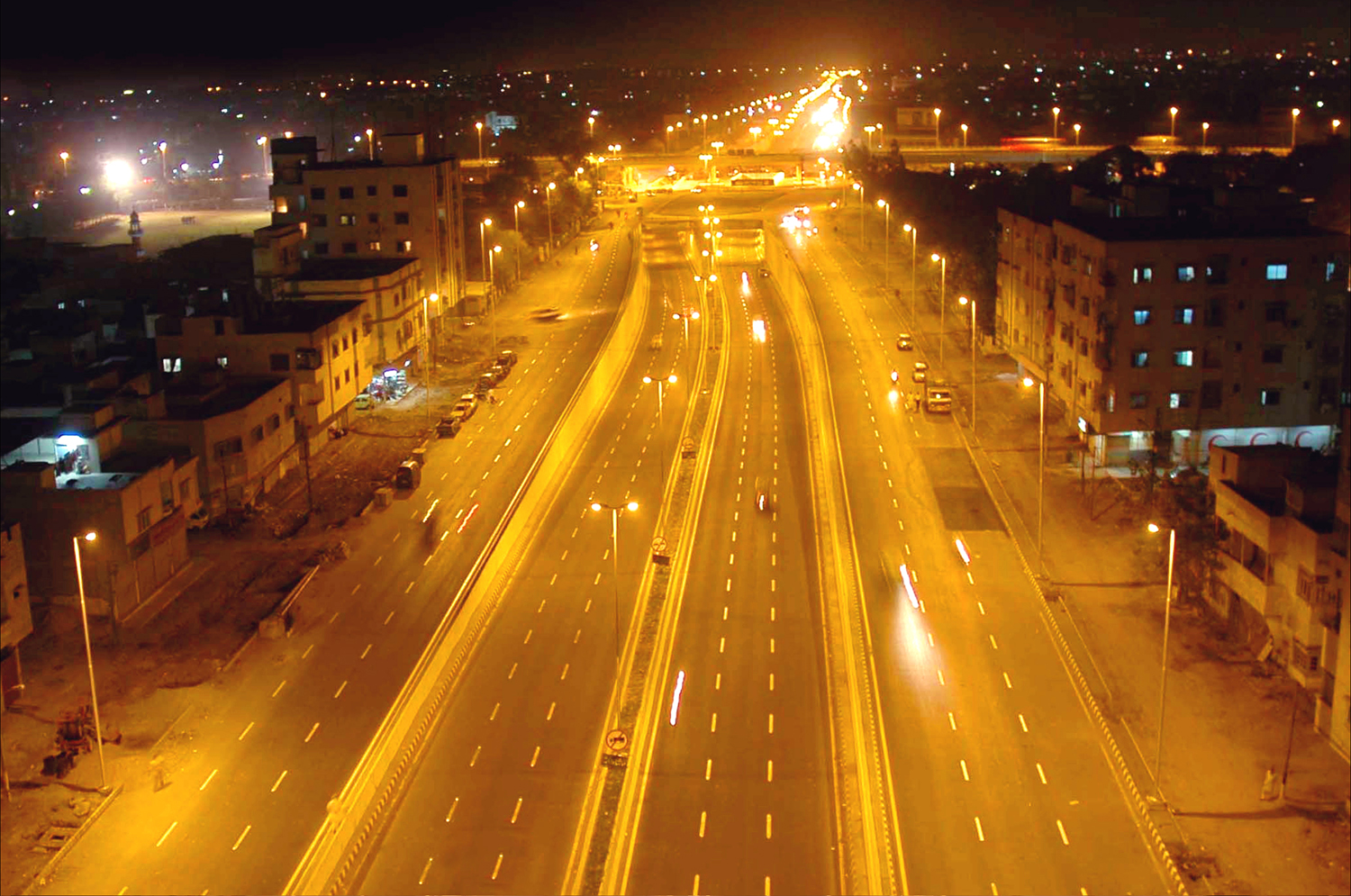
- A view of Nazimabad, Karachi
- Interactive map of Nazimabad ناظم آباد
- Country: Pakistan
- Province: Sindh
- District: Central Karachi
- Constituency: NA-249 Karachi Central-III
- Established: 1952
- Named for: Khawaja Nazimuddin

Government
  - Assistant Commissioner: Rabia Syed

Nazimabad (Urdu: ناظم آباد, Sindhi: نئون ناظم آباد) is a suburb of Karachi, Pakistan. It was established in 1952, and is named after the second Governor General of Pakistan Khawaja Nazimuddin. Nazimabad is located in Liaquatabad Town. One of the largest government own hospitals in Karachi namely Abbasi Shaheed Hospital also situated in Nazimabad No. 5 The Abbasi Shaheed Hospital has 24/7 emergency/trauma facility. The Karachi Matriculation Board is also located in Nazimabad No. 5 The highly populated colony Paposh Nagar is also located in Nazimabad.

== History ==
Before the independence of Pakistan, the area of the present day Nazimabad was semi-arid land with small Sindhi and Balochi villages nearly 10 KM from downtown Karachi. The Government of Pakistan bought the land in 1950 from the local landlord and tribal leader Masti Brohi Khan in order to resettle the Muslim refugees that were living in tent cities in central Karachi. Nazimabad was planned and developed starting in 1952 and the land was sold at reduced prices to the refugees. This suburb was named after Khawaja Nazimuddin who was the second Governor-General of Pakistan, and later the second prime minister as well.

In late 1958, the northern area of Nazimabad was to be developed as Timuria by Karachi Improvement Trust (KIT). The name North Nazimabad became popular and was later adopted instead of Timuria. North Nazimabad was developed as a residential area for federal government employees. But in the early 1960s, the capital of Pakistan was transferred from Karachi to newly developed capital Islamabad.

In the 1950s, Nazimabad was developed in the outskirts of Karachi and now it is in the central part of the city because of the urban sprawl. Nazimabad was considered an Elite Class neighborhood in the 1960-1970s and later it became Upper middle class area as many Elite Class residents moved to the newer developed upscale suburbs and exurbs of Karachi. Starting in late 1950s, the overwhelming majority of Karachi's intellectuals lived in Nazimabad as it was one of the posh neighborhood of Karachi. Starting in the 1990s, Nazimabad was considered to be a Middle class residential neighborhood. The old houses are being demolished and in its place new Apartment, Flat and Commercial buildings are being constructed.

== Plan ==
Nazimabad is divided into five residential blocks, Block I to V and commercial from VI to VII. The Block I-V are residential areas with family dwellings. The Block IV of Nazimabad has the largest category of plots with size ranging from 240 to 2000 sq. yards.

== Municipal devolution ==
After devolution plan for municipalities was implemented in 2001, Karachi Division was divided into 18 towns. Whereby Nazimabad was made part of the Liaquatabad Town. While North Nazimabad was named as one of the towns of Karachi.

== Municipal administration ==
In January 2022, as part of a Sindh provincial local government reorganization, Nazimabad became one of the seven Union Councils forming the newly established Nazimabad Town within Karachi Central District. The council system was notified in April 2023 under the Sindh Local Government & Housing Town Planning Department.

== Infrastructure ==
In mid-2025, North Nazimabad Block B was reported to have achieved uninterrupted 24‑hour electricity service after over 1,600 residents were moved out of scheduled load‑shedding, marking a significant improvement in local power infrastructure.

== Media ==
Nazimabad is referenced in the popular drama serials Zindagi Gulzar Hai and Maat on Hum TV. These series were telecast in Pakistan in 2013 and in 2015 on Zindagi. In the Zindagi Gulzar Hai drama serial, Nazimabad is portrayed as a Middle Class area of Karachi, but at the same time few blocks of Nazimabad belongs to the Upper Middle Class

== Transport ==
The Green Line of the Karachi Metrobus system, operational since December 2021, includes a stop at Nazimabad No.1, improving public transport connectivity in the suburb.

== Demography ==
1. Urdu (74.4%)
2. Pashto (9.00%)
3. Punjabi (5.70%)
4. Sindhi (4.00%)
5. Saraiki (2.10%)
6. Hindko (1.50%)
7. Balochi (0.90%)
8. Others (2.20%)

According to 2023 Pakistani census among people of Nazimabad 74.4% spoke Urdu, 9% spoke Pashto, 5.7% Punjabi, 4% Sindhi, 2.1% Saraiki, 1.5% Hindko, 0.9% Balochi and 2.2% recorded their language as Others. Over 98 percent of the population is Muslim with small minority of Christians.

== See also ==
- Mujahid Colony
- Goal Market
- North Nazimabad
- Liaquatabad Town
- Naya Nazimabad
