= Karachi Central District =

District of Sindh

Coordinates: 24.9313°N 67.0374°E

Nazimabad District ضلع ناظم آباد کراچی
- District of Karachi
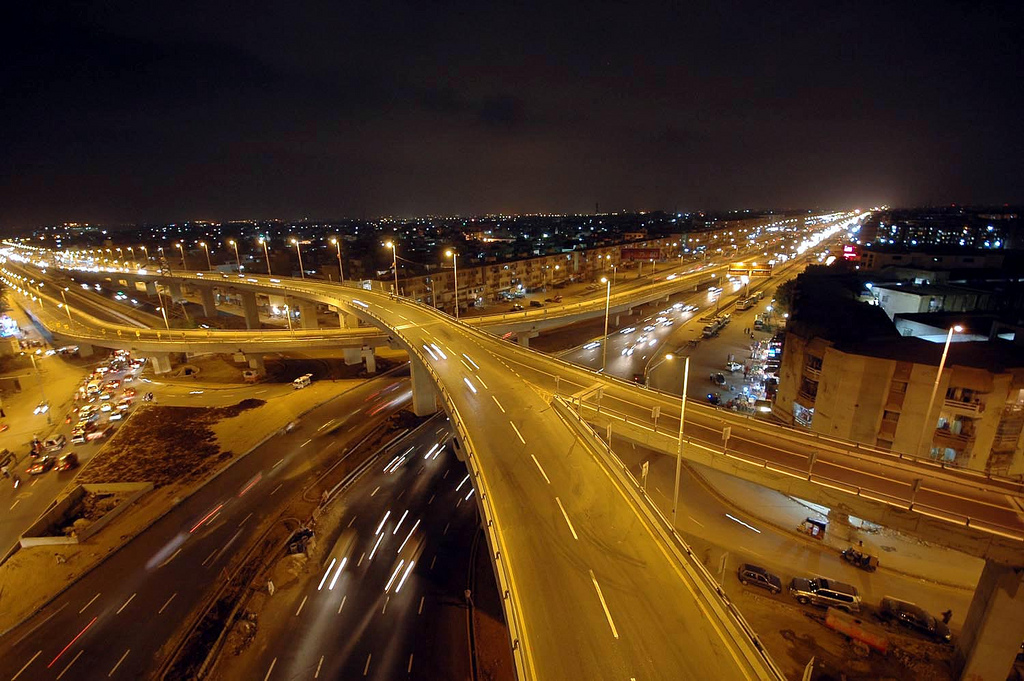
- Nagan Interchange in North Nazimabad

- Map of Nazimabad District
- Country: Pakistan
- Province: Sindh
- Division: Karachi
- Established: 1996; 30 years ago
- Disbanded: 2001; 25 years ago (CDGK)
- Re-established: 11 July 2011; 15 years ago
- Headquarters: DC Office, Sector 15-A/1, Buffer Zone
- Towns: 5: Gulberg Town; Liaquatabad Town; Nazimabad Town; New Karachi Town; North Nazimabad Town

Government
  - Deputy Commissioner: Taha Saleem

Area
  - District of Karachi: 69 km^{2} (27 sq mi)
- Elevation: 27 m (89 ft)
- Highest elevation: 15 m (49 ft)
- Lowest elevation: 49 m (161 ft)

Population (2023)
  - District of Karachi: 3,822,325
  - Density: 55,396/km^{2} (143,470/sq mi)
  - Urban: 3,822,325
  - Rural: 0
- Demonym: Karachiite

Literacy
  - Literacy rate: Total: 83.55%; Male: 83.82%; Female: 83.27%
- Time zone: UTC+05:00 (Pakistan Standard Time)
  - Summer (DST): DST is not observed
- ZIP Code: 74600
- NWD (area) code: 021
- ISO 3166 code: PK-SD
- CNIC Code of Nazimabad District: 42101-XXXXXXX-X
- Website: districtcentral.blogspot.com

Nazimabad District (Urdu: ضلع ناظم آباد), formerly Karachi Central District, is an administrative district of Karachi Division in Sindh, Pakistan created in 1996. According to 2023 Pakistani census population of Nazimabad District is 3,822,325 (3.8 million).

== Town Municipal Committee ==
As per the Sindh Local Government Act, 2021, Sindh government replaced the previous seven District Municipal Corporations (DMCs) with 26 towns, each with its own municipal committee. Karachi Central District has five towns.

- New Karachi Town
- North Nazimabad Town
- Gulberg Town
- Liaquatabad Town
- Nazimabad Town

== Karimabad underpass project ==
The construction of the Karimabad underpass in Karachi has faced significant delays and cost overruns, with its budget escalating from an initial Rs. 1.35 billion to nearly Rs. 4 billion. The project's slow progress is attributed to the discovery of a main water line during excavation, which required deeper digging, as well as delays in the release of funds from the provincial government. A lack of proper initial planning and management has also been cited as a key factor contributing to the issues.

== Water Crisis ==
Karachi Central continues to face an acute water shortage, a problem that worsens significantly during major festivals such as Eid. Despite the city's daily requirement of over 1,200 million gallons of water (MGD), it receives only around 650 MGD, leading to chronic supply deficits across multiple localities. The situation in Karachi Central is further exacerbated by high line losses and widespread water theft, which reduce the already limited supply reaching residents. During Eid holidays, the demand surges due to increased household consumption and water use for ritual sacrifices, intensifying the crisis and leaving large segments of the population struggling to access adequate water for daily needs.

== History ==
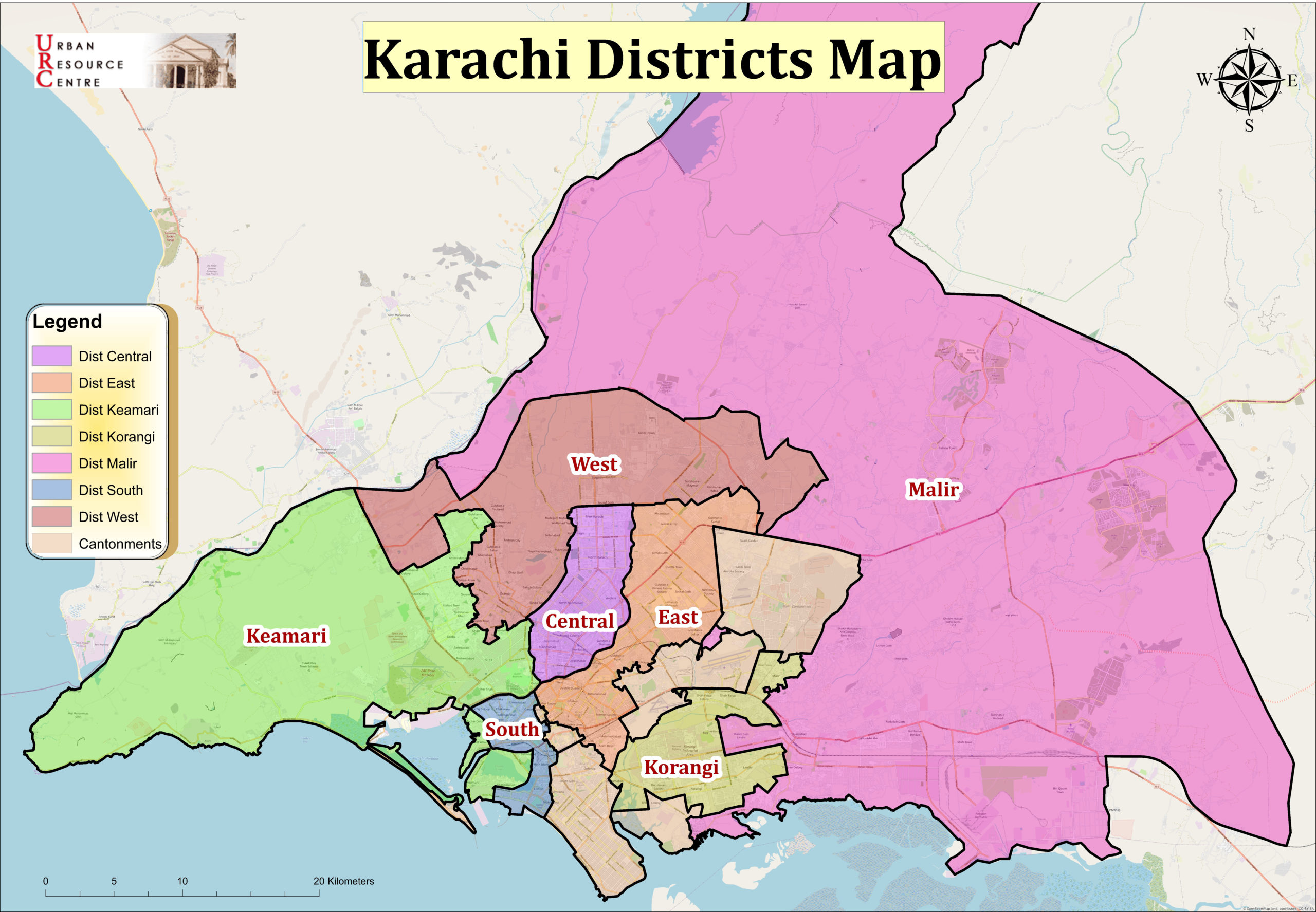
Districts of Karachi Division

The district was abolished in 2000 and divided into four towns namely Gulberg Town, Liaquatabad Town, New Karachi Town, and North Nazimabad Town.

On 11 July 2011, the Government of Sindh restored Karachi Central District again.

Karachi Central District has the following dehs: Gujhro (P), in the talukas of Gulberg and Liaquatabad, and Kari Lakhi, in the taluka of North Nazimabad.

In 2022, it was divided into five towns namely Gulberg Town, Liaquatabad Town, Nazimabad Town, New Karachi Town, and North Nazimabad Town respectively.

In 2023, the Government of Sindh renamed Karachi Central District to Nazimabad District to align with Nazimabad Town.

== Union committees ==
The following is a list of the union councils of Nazimabad District, and their respective neighbourhoods and suburban localities. Nazimabad District has a total of five towns and 45 union councils.

=== Gulberg Town ===
Union Council
U.C. 1 Shafiq Mill Colony
U.C. 2 Samanabad
U.C. 3 Water Pump
U.C. 4 Naseerabad
U.C. 5 Yaseenabad
U.C. 6 Azizabad
U.C. 7 Karimabad
U.C. 8 Gulberg

=== Liaquatabad Town ===
Union Council
U.C. 1 Moosa Colony
U.C. 2 Sharifabad
U.C. 3 Bandhani Colony
U.C. 4 Ibn-e-Seena
U.C. 5 Commercial Area
U.C. 6 Dak Khana
U.C. 7 C-Area

=== Nazimabad Town ===
Union Council
U.C. 1 Paposh Nagar
U.C. 2 Abbasi Shaheed
U.C. 3 Hadi Market
U.C. 4 Nazimabad
U.C. 5 Rizvia Society (R.C.H.S.)
U.C. 6 Firdous Colony
U.C. 7 Gulbahar

=== New Karachi Town ===
Union Council
U.C. 1 Shah Nawaz Bhutto Colony
U.C. 2 Gulshan-e-Saeed
U.C. 3 Khawaja Ajmeer Nagri
U.C. 4 Godhra
U.C. 5 Abu Zar Ghaffari
U.C. 6 Khamiso Goth
U.C. 7 Madina Colony
U.C. 8 Faisal Colony
U.C. 9 Abu Zar Ghaffari
U.C. 10 Godhra
U.C. 11 Hakim Ahsan
U.C. 12 Kailana
U.C. 13 Shah Nawaz Bhutto Colony

=== North Nazimabad Town ===
Union Council
U.C. 1 Sir Syed Colony
U.C. 2 Farooq-e-Azam
U.C. 3 Siddiq-e-Akbar
U.C. 4 Buffer Zone
U.C. 5 Taimooria
U.C. 6 Sakhi Hassan
U.C. 7 Hyderi
U.C. 8 Al-Falah
U.C. 9 Pahar Gunj
U.C. 10 Mustafaabad

== Demographics ==
Historical population
Year	Pop.	±% p.a.
1961	...	—
1972	...	—
1981	...	—
1998	2,289,071	—
2017	2,971,382	+1.38%
2023	3,822,325	+4.29%

As of the 2023 census, Karachi Central district has 651,268 households and a population of 3,822,325. The district has a sex ratio of 112.01 males to 100 females and a literacy rate of 83.55%: 83.82% for males and 83.27% for females. 898,383 (23.52% of the surveyed population) are under 10 years of age. The entire population lives in urban areas.

Religions in Karachi Central district (2023)
Religion	Percent
Islam	98.33%
Christianity	1.27%
Other or not stated	0.40%

The majority religion is Islam, with 98.33% of the population. Christianity is practiced by 1.27% of the population.

Languages of Karachi Central district (2023)
1. Urdu (80.2%)
2. Pashto (4.65%)
3. Punjabi (4.04%)
4. Saraiki (3.88%)
5. Sindhi (2.22%)
6. Balochi (0.88%)
7. Hindko (0.82%)
8. Others (3.30%)

At the time of the 2023 census, 80.20% of the population spoke Urdu, 4.04% Punjabi, 4.65% Pashto, 3.88% Saraiki, 2.22% Sindhi, 0.88% Balochi and 0.82% Hindko as their first language.
