= North Nazimabad Town =

Residential town within the city of Karachi, Pakistan

Coordinates: 24.9426°N 67.0474°E

North Nazimabad Town شمالی ناظم آباد ٹاؤن
- Constituent Town of Karachi
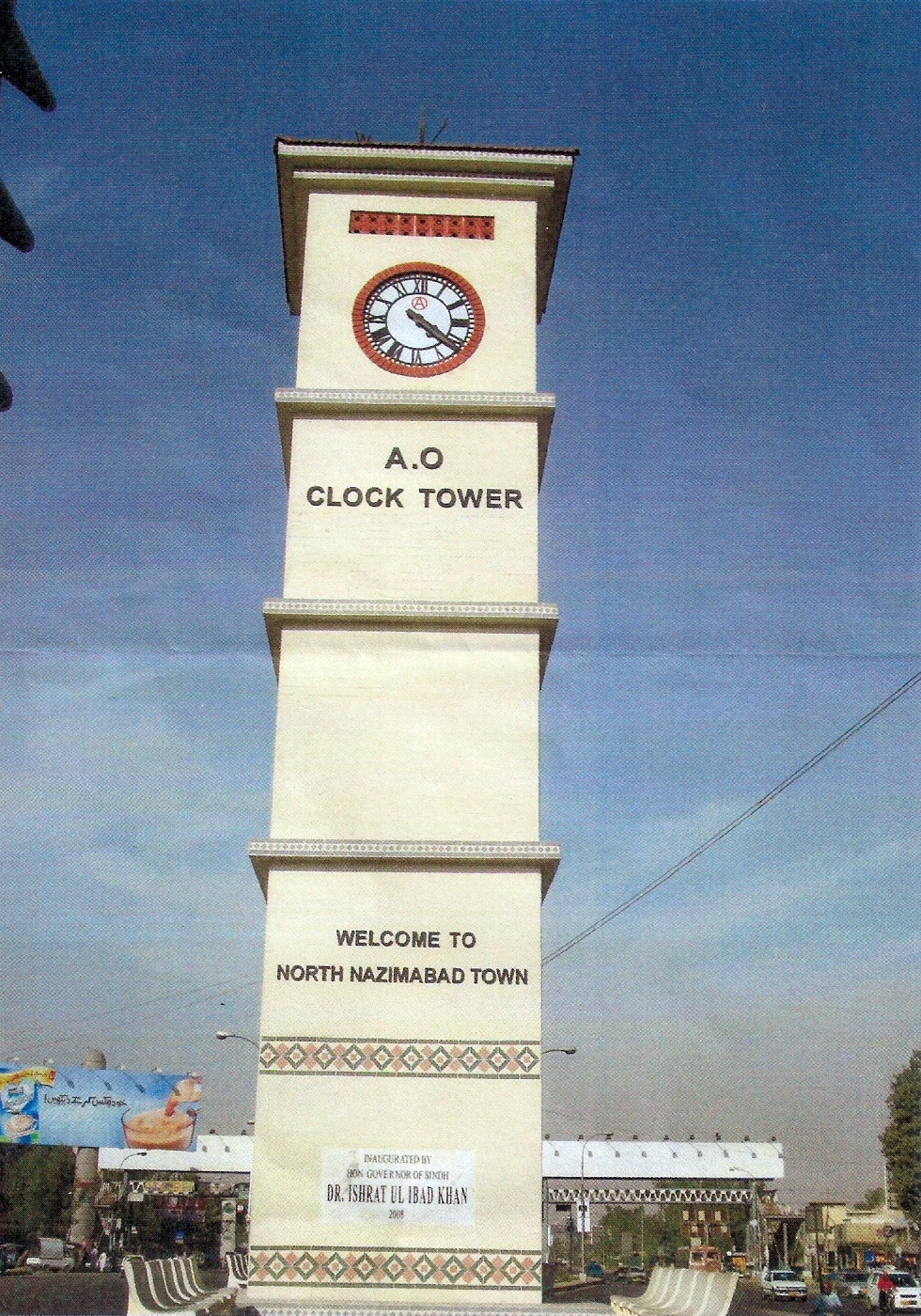
- AO Clock Tower in North Nazimabad before its dismantling in 2017
- Interactive map of North Nazimabad Town
- Country: Pakistan
- Province: Sindh
- District: Nazimabad District
- Division: Karachi Division
- Constituency: NA-250 Karachi Central-IV
- Town Established: 1972; 54 years ago
- Town status: 14 August 2001; 25 years ago
- Disbanded: 11 July 2011; 15 years ago
- Reorganized: March 2015; 11 years ago
- Union Committees in Town Municipal Corporation: 10: Sir Syed Farooq-e-Azam Siddiq-e-Akbar Buffer Zone Taimooria Sakhi Hassan Hyderi Al-Falha Pahar Ganj Mustafaabad

Government
  - Type: Government of Karachi
  - Body: Town Municipal Corporation (TMC)
  - Town Chairman: Atif Ali Khan (JI)

Area
  - Total: 23 km^{2} (8.9 sq mi)
- Elevation: 47 m (154 ft)
- Highest elevation: 123 m (404 ft)
- Lowest elevation: 23 m (75 ft)

Population (2023 Pakistani census)
  - Total: 920,476
  - Density: 40,104.91/km^{2} (103,871.2/sq mi)
- Demonym: Karachiite
- Time zone: UTC+05:00 (PKT)
  - Summer (DST): DST is not observed
- ZIP Code: 74700
- NWD (area) code: 021
- ISO 3166 code: PK-SD
- Website: tmcnorthnazimabad.gos.pk

North Nazimabad Town (Urdu: شمالی ناظم آباد ٹاؤن) lies in the northern part of the city of Karachi, Pakistan, and was named after the suburb of North Nazimabad. North Nazimabad Town was formed in 2001 as part of the Local Government Ordinance 2001, and was subdivided into 10 union councils and North Nazimabad Town was re-organized as part of Karachi Central District in 2015. According to the 2023 Pakistani census, the population of North Nazimabad Subdivision is 920,476.

In January 2022, the town system was restored by a Government of Sindh notification dividing Karachi into 26 towns and 233 union councils.

== Town Municipal Committee ==
As per the Sindh Local Government Act, 2021, Sindh government replaced the previous seven District Municipal Corporations (DMCs) with 26 towns, each with its own municipal committee. Karachi Central District has five towns.

- New Karachi Town
- North Nazimabad Town
- Gulberg Town
- Liaquatabad Town
- Nazimabad Town

== History ==
=== 2000 ===
The federal government introduced local government reforms in the year 2000, which eliminated the previous "third tier of government" (administrative divisions) and replaced it with the fourth tier (districts). The effect in Karachi was the dissolution of the former Karachi Division, and the merging of its five districts to form a new Karachi City-District with eighteen autonomous constituent towns including North Nazimabad Town.

=== 2011 ===
In 2011, the system was disbanded but remained in place for bureaucratic administration until 2015, when the Karachi Metropolitan Corporation system was reintroduced.

=== 2015 ===
In 2015, North Nazimabad Town was re-organized as part of Karachi Central district.

== Demographics ==
Languages of North Nazimabad sub-division (2023 Pakistani census)
1. Urdu (72.1%)
2. Pashto (7.99%)
3. Saraiki (7.14%)
4. Punjabi (5.66%)
5. Sindhi (1.82%)
6. Balochi (1.21%)
7. Hindko (1.07%)
8. Others (2.98%)

There are in total 920,476 people in North Nazimabad sub-division of which 663,698 spoke Urdu, 73,595 Pashto, 65,767 Saraiki, 52,139 Punjabi, 16,785 Sindhi, 11,155 Balochi, 9,851 Hindko and 27,486 others.

Language	Rank	2023 census	Speakers
Urdu	1	72.10%	663,698
Pashto	2	7.99%	73,595
Saraiki	3	7.14%	65,767
Punjabi	4	5.66%	52,139
Others	6	7.09%	65,277
All	7	100%	920,476

Religions

There are 903,985 Muslims, 14,220 Christians, 1,571 Hindus, 472 Ahmadiyya, 30 scheduled castes, 21 Sikhs, 7 Parsis and 220 others of total population 920,476 of North Nazimabad sub-division.

Religions in North Nazimabad sub-division (2023)
Religion	Percent
Islam	98.20%
Christianity	1.54%
Hinduism	0.17%
Other	0.07%

== Union Committees ==
10 Union Committees of North Nazimabad in Town Municipal Corporation

Sub Sr Number	Councils Falling in District (Nazimabad)	Number of Union Committee	Name of UC in Town Municipal Corporation
1	TMC North Nazimabad	UC#01	Sir Syed
2	TMC North Nazimabad	UC#02	Farooq-e-Azam
3	TMC North Nazimabad	UC#03	Siddiq-e-Akbar
4	TMC North Nazimabad	UC#04	Buffer Zone
5	TMC North Nazimabad	UC#05	Taimooria
6	TMC North Nazimabad	UC#06	Sakhi Hassan
7	TMC North Nazimabad	UC#07	Hyderi
8	TMC North Nazimabad	UC#08	Al-Falah
9	TMC North Nazimabad	UC#09	Pahar Gunj
10	TMC North Nazimabad	UC#10	Mustafaabad

== Constituency ==
NA-250 Karachi Central-IV

== See also ==
- Karachi
- North Nazimabad
