= Administrative divisions of Karachi =

Evolution of local politics in Karachi

Karachi Towns
Population
(1998 census)
(2006 estimate)
(2023 Census)

9,339,023
11,969,284

2,03,82,881

Area
3,528 km^{2}
Mayor
Murtuza Wahab
Deputy Mayor
Salman Murad
District Coordination Officer
Fazal-ur-Rehman
Towns
25
Union Councils
226
Website
karachicity.gov.pk

Karachi, which is the most populated city in Pakistan, was a federation of eighteen autonomous boroughs, called "Towns," that made up the City District of Karachi from 2001 until 2011. Under this now-defunct system, Karachi had a local government system, with a mayor empowered to make decisions in regards to city-planning and administration of local services. The system was abolished in 2011, and Karachi was divided into 5 City District Municipal Corporations, with a 6th formed in 2013. Each Municipal Corporation now has its own Chairman and Deputy Chairman. The Karachi Development Authority, which controls city-planning and administration of services in Karachi, is no longer controlled at the local level, but is instead administered by the province directly.

== History ==
The history of the administration of Karachi begins in 1846, when a cholera epidemic threatened the 9,000 citizens of the city. The efforts to combat this infectious disease were coordinated by a Conservancy Board. In 1852, the Conservancy Board became a Municipal Commission and in 1853, it was upgraded to Municipal Committee. In 1878, the city was empowered to collect taxes at a local level.

The City of Karachi Municipal Act was promulgated in 1933, and the Municipal Committee became a multi-ethnic 57-member Municipal Corporation with a President and a Vice-President in place of the former Mayor and Deputy Mayor. The first President was Jamshed Naserwanji, who had previously served as Mayor for twenty years.

Karachi Population
1961 census	1,912,598
1972 census	3,498,634
1981 census	5,208,132
1998 census	9,339,023
2006 estimate	13,969,284
2006 estimate	17,969,284
Source	World Gazetteer

After independence in 1947, Karachi became the capital of the newly independent state of Pakistan and Mayor Hakim Ehsan received the Governor-General, Muhammad Ali Jinnah, at Karachi International Airport. 1948 saw the city boundaries fixed within the new Federal Capital Territory, which covered 2,103 km^{2} but also included several small towns and villages separate from Karachi.

During the period from 1961 to 1970 the former Federal Capital Territory was merged with the neighbouring princely state of Las Bela to form the Karachi-Bela Division of West Pakistan. During the 1970s this merger was reversed and Karachi became a division in its own right, covering 3,528 km^{2}.

The Karachi Municipal Corporation was upgraded to a Metropolitan Corporation in 1976, followed by Zonal Municipal Committees operating from 1987 to 1994. The system of government changed again in 1996, when the Division of Karachi was subdivided into five districts, each with its own Municipal Corporation.

In 1999, President Pervez Musharraf committed itself to an overhaul of the entire administrative structure of the country. In the year 2000, the entire third tier of government (administrative divisions) was abolished in favour of the fourth tier (districts). In Karachi, the division of Karachi and the five districts were merged to form a new City-District which was subdivided in August 2001 into eighteen autonomous towns comprising 178 local union councils.

The town system was abolished in 2011, and the Karachi Development Authority is run at the provincial, rather than local, level.

== Karachi Districts ==
Karachi is divided into 7 districts. In 2024 the Sindh Government announced plans to rename 4 districts reflecting a shift towards adopting more localized naming conventions.

1. Karachi District — (Formerly Karachi South District)
2. Gulshan District — (Formerly Karachi East District)
3. Orangi District — (Formerly Karachi West District)
4. Nazimabad District — (Formerly Karachi Central District)
5. Korangi District
6. Malir District
7. Keamari District

== Karachi Towns ==
As of 2024, Karachi has 226 Union Councils and 25 Towns as follow:

District Karachi, Karachi:

1. Saddar Town
2. Lyari Town

District Gulshan, Karachi:

1. Gulshan Town
2. Jinnah Town
3. Jamshed Town
4. Safoora Goth Town
5. Sohrab Goth Town

District Nazimabad, Karachi:

1. Nazimabad Town
2. North Nazimabad Town
3. Gulberg Town
4. Liaquatabad Town
5. New Karachi Town

District Malir, Karachi:

1. Malir Town
2. Gadap Town
3. Ibrahim Hyderi Town

District Korangi, Karachi:

1. Model Colony Town
2. Shah Faisal Town
3. Korangi Town
4. Landhi Town

District Orangi, Karachi:

1. Orangi Town
2. Mominabad Town
3. Manghopir Town

District Keamari, Karachi:

1. Keamari Town
2. Baldia Town
3. Moriro Mirbahar Town

== Karachi Union Councils ==
=== Karachi District ===
Number of Union Committee	Name of Union committee in town Municipal Corporations
No.1 Saddar Town	Bhim Pura - Ghanchi Para
No.2 Saddar Town	Hassan Lashkari Village
No.3 Saddar Town	Garden West
No.4 Saddar Town	Millat Nagar
No.5 Saddar Town	Gazdarabad - Ranchore Line
No.6 Saddar Town	Nanak Wara
No.7 Saddar Town	Kharadar - Old City Area (Mithadar/Sarafa/Jodia Bazar)
No.8 Saddar Town	City Railway Colony
No.9 Saddar Town	Saddar
No.10 Saddar Town	Hijrat Colony
No.11 Saddar Town	Civil Lines - Frere Town
No.12 Saddar Town	Boat Basin
No.13 Saddar Town	Clifton - Kehkashan
No.1 Lyari Town	Agra Taj Colony
No.2 Lyari Town	Bihar Colony
No.3 Lyari Town	Gulshan Colony
No.4 Lyari Town	Singo Lane
No.5 Lyari Town	Nawa Lane
No.6 Lyari Town	Kalakot - Rexer Lane
No.7 Lyari Town	Ghulam Muhammad Lane - Ragiwara
No.8 Lyari Town	Kalri - Shah Baig Lane
No.9 Lyari Town	Daryaabad - Hingorabad
No.10 Lyari Town	Khadda Memon Society
No.11 Lyari Town	Nayaabad
No.12 Lyari Town	Baghdadi
No.13 Lyari Town	Jinnahabad - Ghulam Shah Lane

=== Gulshan District ===
Council Falling in District	Number of Union Committee	Name of Union committee in town Municipal Corporations
Gulshan Town	Union Committee No.1	Essa Nagri
	Union Committee No.2	Hassan Square
	Union Committee No.3	Jamali Colony
	Union Committee No.4	Zia-ul-Haq Colony
	Union Committee No.5	New Dhoraji
	Union Committee No.6	Metroville-III
	Union Committee No.7	Shanti Nagar
	Union Committee No.8	National Stadium
Jinnah Town	Union Committee No.1	Pakistan Quarters
	Union Committee No.2	Soldier Bazar
	Union Committee No.3	Patel Para
	Union Committee No.4	Jamshed Quarters
	Union Committee No.5	Martin Quarters
	Union Committee No.6	Garden East
	Union Committee No.7	Bahadurabad
	Union Committee No.8	Delhi Mercantile Society
	Union Committee No.9	Jacob Lines
	Union Committee No.10	Jutland Lines - Lines Area
Chanesar Town	Union Committee No.1	P.E.C.H.S. 2
	Union Committee No.2	P.E.C.H.S. 6
	Union Committee No.3	Mehmoodabad
	Union Committee No.4	Manzoor Colony
	Union Committee No.5	Manzoor Colony-II
	Union Committee No.6	Akhtar Colony
	Union Committee No.7	Akhtar Colony-II
	Union Committee No.8	Chanesar Goth
Safoora Town	Union Committee No.1	Abbas Town
	Union Committee No.2	Gulzar-e-Hijri / Scheme 33
	Union Committee No.3	Sachal Goth
	Union Committee No.4	Al-Azhar Garden
	Union Committee No.5	Johar Complex
	Union Committee No.6	Pehlwan Goth
	Union Committee No.7	Gulistan-e-Johar
	Union Committee No.8	Safari Park
Sohrab Town	Union Committee No.1	Al-Asif Square
	Union Committee No.2	New Quetta Town
	Union Committee No.3	Sukhiya Goth
	Union Committee No.4	Ayub Goth
	Union Committee No.5	Khadim Hussain Goth
	Union Committee No.6	Ahsanabad
	Union Committee No.7	Yousuf Shah Goth
	Union Committee No.8	Sabzi Mandi

=== Nazimabad District ===
Council Falling in District	Number of Union Committee	Name of Union committee in town Municipal Corporations
Nazimabad Town	Union Committee No.1	Paposh Nagar
	Union Committee No.2	Abbasi Shaheed
	Union Committee No.3	Hadi Market
	Union Committee No.4	Nazimabad
	Union Committee No.5	Rizvia Society
	Union Committee No.6	Firdous Colony
	Union Committee No.7	Gulbahar
North Nazimabad Town	Union Committee No.1	Farooq-e-Azam
	Union Committee No.2	Siddiq-e-Akbar
	Union Committee No.3	Buffer Zone
	Union Committee No.4	Taimooria
	Union Committee No.5	Sakhi Hassan
	Union Committee No.6	Hyderi
	Union Committee No.7	Shadman
	Union Committee No.8	Pahar Gunj
	Union Committee No.9	Mustafaabad
Gulberg Town	Union Committee No.1	Azizabad
	Union Committee No.2	Karimabad
	Union Committee No.3	Aisha Manzil
	Union Committee No.4	Samanabad
	Union Committee No.5	Naseerabad
	Union Committee No.6	Yaseenabad
	Union Committee No.7	Water Pump
	Union Committee No.8	Shafiq Mill Colony
Liaquatabad Town	Union Committee No.1	Moosa Colony
	Union Committee No.2	Sharifabad
	Union Committee No.3	Ibn-e-Seena
	Union Committee No.4	Bandhani Colony
	Union Committee No.5	Commercial Area
	Union Committee No.6	Dak Khana
	Union Committee No.7	C-Area
New Karachi Town	Union Committee No.1	Shah Nawaz Bhutto Colony
	Union Committee No.2	Gulshan-e-Saeed
	Union Committee No.3	Khawaja Ajmer Nagri
	Union Committee No.4	Godhra
	Union Committee No.5	Abu Zar Ghaffari
	Union Committee No.6	Khamiso Goth
	Union Committee No.7	Madina Colony
	Union Committee No.8	Faisal Colony
	Union Committee No.9	Hakeem Ahsan
	Union Committee No.10	Kaliana
	Union Committee No.11	Fatima Jinnah Colony
	Union Committee No.12	Sir Syed Colony

=== Malir District ===
Council Falling in District	Number of Union Committee	Name of Union committee in town Municipal Corporations
Malir Town	Union Committee No.1	Khokhrapar
	Union Committee No.2	Ghazi Dawood Brohi Goth
	Union Committee No.3	Jafar-e-Tayyar
	Union Committee No.4	Kala Board
	Union Committee No.5	Quaidabad
	Union Committee No.6	Dawood Chowrangi
	Union Committee No.7	Future Colony
	Union Committee No.8	Sharafi Goth
	Union Committee No.9	Bakhtawar Goth
	Union Committee No.10	Saudabad
	Union Committee No.11	Malir Extension
Gadap Town	Union Committee No.1	Surjani
	Union Committee No.2	Gaghar
	Union Committee No.3	Taiser
	Union Committee No.4	Gulshan-e-Hadeed
	Union Committee No.5	Steel Town
	Union Committee No.6	Saleh Muhammad Goth
	Union Committee No.7	Murad Memon Goth
	Union Committee No.8	Darsano Chano
	Union Committee No.9	Shah Mureed
	Union Committee No.10	Gadap
Ibrahim Hyderi Town	Union Committee No.1	Chaukhandi
	Union Committee No.2	Shah Latif Town
	Union Committee No.3	Cattle Colony
	Union Committee No.4	Majeed Colony
	Union Committee No.5	Muzzaffarabad
	Union Committee No.6	Muslimabad
	Union Committee No.7	Sher Pao Colony
	Union Committee No.8	Ibrahim Hyderi
	Union Committee No.9	Chashma
	Union Committee No.10	Rehri
	Union Committee No.11	Bin Qasim

=== Korangi District ===
Council Falling in District	Number of Union Committee	Name of Union committee in town Municipal Corporations
Model Colony Town	Union Committee No.1	Model Colony
	Union Committee No.2	Kazimabad
	Union Committee No.3	Indus Mehran
	Union Committee No.4	Jinnah Avenue
	Union Committee No.5	Moinabad
Shah Faisal Town	Union Committee No.1	Natha Khan Goth
	Union Committee No.2	Pak Sadat Colony
	Union Committee No.3	Drigh Colony
	Union Committee No.4	Reta Plot
	Union Committee No.5	Moria Khan Goth
	Union Committee No.6	Albadar
	Union Committee No.7	Al-Falah Society - Rafah-e-Aam
	Union Committee No.8	Azeem Pura
Korangi Town	Union Committee No.1	Bilal Colony
	Union Committee No.2	Nasir Colony
	Union Committee No.3	Chakra Goth
	Union Committee No.4	Mustafa Taj Colony
	Union Committee No.5	Hundred Quarters
	Union Committee No.6	Gulzar Colony
	Union Committee No.7	Zaman Town
	Union Committee No.8	Hasrat Mohani Colony
	Union Committee No.9	Korangi Sector 33
	Union Committee No.10	Korangi Sector 34
Landhi Town	Union Committee No.1	Khurramabad
	Union Committee No.2	Bhutto Nagar
	Union Committee No.3	Khawaja Ajmer Colony
	Union Committee No.4	Landhi
	Union Committee No.5	Awami Colony
	Union Committee No.6	Barmi Colony
	Union Committee No.7	Sherabad Colony
	Union Committee No.8	Bagh-e-Korangi
	Union Committee No.9	Zafar Town

=== Orangi District ===
Council Falling in District	Number of Union Committee	Name of Union committee in town Municipal Corporations
Orangi Town	Union Committee No.1	Chishti Nagar
	Union Committee No.2	Benazir Colony
	Union Committee No.3	Muslim Nagar
	Union Committee No.4	Jinnah Colony
	Union Committee No.5	Iqbal Baloch Colony
	Union Committee No.6	Naeem Shah Bukhari Colony
	Union Committee No.7	Shah Waliullah Nagar
	Union Committee No.8	Data Nagar
	Union Committee No.9	Mujahidabad
Mominabad Town	Union Committee No.1	Fareed Colony
	Union Committee No.2	Haryana Colony
	Union Committee No.3	Bismillah Colony
	Union Committee No.4	Islam Nagar
	Union Committee No.5	Mominabad
	Union Committee No.6	Frontier Colony
	Union Committee No.7	Banaras Colony
	Union Committee No.8	Peerabad
	Union Committee No.9	Qasba Colony
Manghopir Town	Union Committee No.1	Manghopir
	Union Committee No.2	Mai Ghari
	Union Committee No.3	Pukhtoonabad
	Union Committee No.4	Yousuf Goth
	Union Committee No.5	Raheem Goth
	Union Committee No.6	KDA Flats
	Union Committee No.7	Bhatti Goth
	Union Committee No.8	Lyari Expressway Resettlement Project
	Union Committee No.9	Mullah Hussain Brohi
	Union Committee No.10	Kuwari Colony
	Union Committee No.11	Ghazi Goth

=== Keamari District ===
Council Falling in District	Number of Union Committee	Name of Union committee in town Municipal Corporations
Kaemari Town	Union Committee No.1	Bhutta Village
	Union Committee No.2	Sikanderabad
	Union Committee No.3	Sultanabad
	Union Committee No.4	Keamari
	Union Committee No.5	Baba Bhit
	Union Committee No.6	Machar Colony
	Union Committee No.7	Mauripur
	Union Committee No.8	Sher Shah
	Union Committee No.9	Gabo Pat
Baldia Town	Union Committee No.1	Gulshan-e-Ghazi
	Union Committee No.2	Ittehad Town
	Union Committee No.3	Islam Nagar
	Union Committee No.4	Nai Abadi
	Union Committee No.5	Saeedabad
	Union Committee No.6	Muslim Mujahid Colony
	Union Committee No.7	Muhajir Camp
	Union Committee No.8	Rasheedabad
Moriro Mirbahar Town	Union Committee No.1	Pak Colony
	Union Committee No.2	Old Golimar
	Union Committee No.3	Jahanabad
	Union Committee No.4	Metrovile
	Union Committee No.5	Bhawani Chali

== See also ==
- City District Government
- Karachi
- Lahore
