= Mula Essa Goth =

Neighbourhood in Karachi, Pakistan

Coordinates: 24°50′N 67°10′E

Mula Essa Goth is one of the neighbourhoods of Gadap Town in Karachi, Sindh, Pakistan.

There are several ethnic groups in Mula Essa Goth including Muhajirs, Christians, Sindhis, Kashmiris, Seraikis, Pakhtuns, Balochis, Memons, Bohras and Ismailis.

Wide and newly built roads with all facilities i.e. water, gas, electricity, telephone, cable TV and cable net. Plots start from 200 square yards (170 m^{2}) up to 4,000 square yards (3,300 m^{2}).

== See also ==
- Gadap Town
- Darsano Chana
- Gabol Town
- Gadap
- Gujro
- Gulshan-e-Maymar
- Gulshan-e-Sheraz
- Khuda Ki Basti
- Manghopir Hills
- Manghopir
- Maymarabad
- Murad Memon Goth
- Songal
- Surjani Town
- Yousuf Goth
- Sohrab Goth
