= Maymarabad =

Neighbourhood of Karachi, Pakistan

Maymarabad (Urdu: معمار آباد) is a neighbourhood in the Malir district of Karachi, Pakistan. Until 2011, the neighbourhood was a part of Gadap Town.

== See also ==
- Ahsanabad
- Darsano Chana
- Gabol Town
- Gadap
- Gujro
- Gulshan-e-Maymar
- Gulshan-e-Sheraz
- Khuda Ki Basti
- Manghopir Hills
- Manghopir
- Gadap Town
- Murad Memon Goth
- Songal
- Surjani Town
- Yousuf Goth
- Sohrab Goth
