= Gulshan-e-Sheraz =

Neighbourhood in Karachi, Pakistan

Gulshan-e-Sheraz (Urdu: گلشنِ شیراز) is one of the neighbourhoods of Gadap Town in Karachi, Sindh, Pakistan.

There various ethnic groups residing in Gulshan-e-Sheraz include Muhajirs, Sindhis, Punjabis, Kashmiris, Seraikis, Pakhtuns, Balochis, Memons, Bohras, Ismailis, etc. Over 99% of Gadap Town's population of nearly one million is Muslim.

== See also ==
- Ahsanabad
- Darsano Chana
- Gabol Town
- Gadap
- Gujro
- Gulshan-e-Maymar
- Gadap Town
- Khuda Ki Basti
- Manghopir Hills
- Manghopir
- Maymarabad
- Murad Memon Goth
- Songal
- Surjani Town
- Yousuf Goth
- Sohrab Goth
