= Malir Town =

Residential town within the city of Karachi, Pakistan

Malir Town ملیر ٹاؤن ملير ٽائون
- Constituent Town of Karachi
- Interactive map of Malir Town
- Coordinates: 24°53′35″N 67°11′43″E
- Country: Pakistan
- Province: Sindh
- City: Karachi
- District: Malir District
- Established: 14 August 2001
- Union Councils: 10: UC1- Gharibabad UC2- Dawood Goth UC3- Jafar-e-Tayyar UC4- Khuldabad UC5- Qaidabad UC6- Dawood Chowrangi UC7- Future Colony UC8- Sharafi Goth UC9- Bakhtawar Goth UC10- Bhittaiabad

Government
  - Type: TMC
  - Chairman: Jan Muhammad Baloch

Population (2023 Census of Pakistan)
  - Total: 2,419,736 (population of Malir District including Malir Town)
- Office Location: Near Saudabad Police Station, Kalaboard, Malir Colony, Karachi. 75080
- Website: https://tmcmalir.gos.pk/

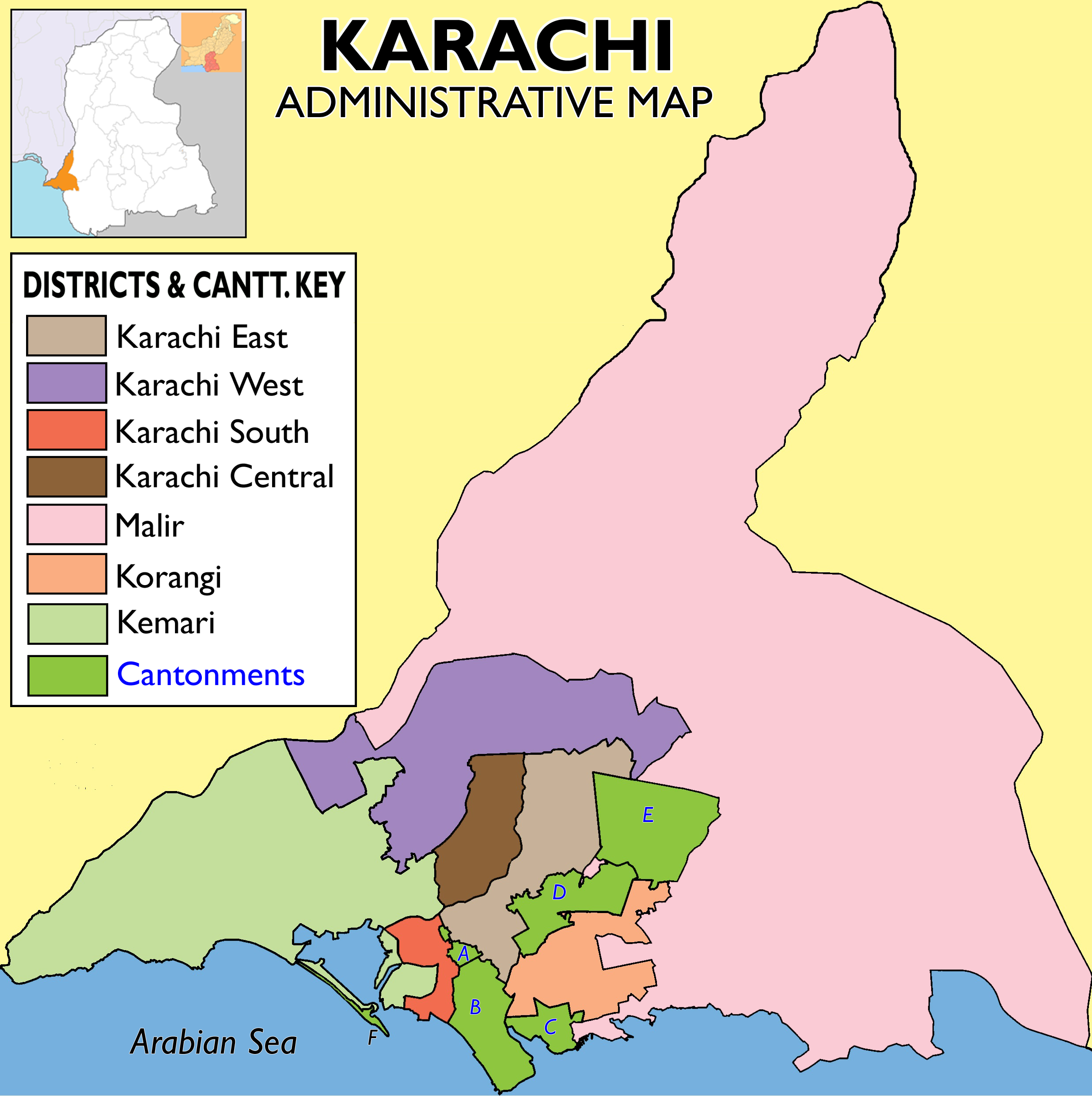
Karachi districts

Malir Town (Urdu: ملير ٹاؤن) is the Constituent Town of Karachi Malir District and lies in the northern part of the city that was named after the Malir River.

== History ==
=== Administrative status ===
==== 2000 ====
The federal government introduced local government reforms in the year 2000, which eliminated the previous "third tier of government" (administrative divisions) and replaced it with the fourth tier (districts). The effect in Karachi was the dissolution of the former Karachi Division, and the merging of its five districts to form a new Karachi City-District with eighteen autonomous constituent towns including Malir Town.

==== 2001 ====
Malir District was abolished as part of the Local Government Ordinance 2001 and divided into three towns namely:

- Malir Town,
- Bin Qasim Town
- and Gadap Town.

Malir Town was formed and was subdivided into 8 union councils.

==== 2011 ====
In 2011, the system was disbanded but remained in place for bureaucratic administration until 2015, when the Karachi Metropolitan Corporation system was reintroduced.

On 11 July 2011, Sindh Government restored Malir District again.

The town system was disbanded in 2011.

==== 2015 ====
In 2015, Malir Town was re-organized as part of Karachi Malir District.

==== 2022 ====
Under the Sindh Local Government Act, 2021, the Sindh government reorganized the administrative structure of Karachi by replacing the previous seven District Municipal Corporations (DMCs) with 26 towns, each governed by its own Town Municipal Committee (TMC). As a result of this reform, Malir District was divided into three towns:

Malir Town

Gadap Town

Ibrahim Hyderi Town

These towns were officially reinstated as part of the new local government setup implemented for the 2022 local body elections.

== Location ==
Malir Town was bordered by the Jinnah International Airport and the Malir Cantonment to the west and north, the Malir River and Shah Faisal Town to the south and Gadap Town to the east across the Thado Nallo stream.

== Official neighbourhoods ==
- Walidad Goth
- Soomar Kandani Khaskheli Goth
- Indus Mehran Society
- Hashim Khaskheli Goth
- Soomar Ismail Khaskheli Goth
- Gharibabad
- Ghausia Colony
- Ghazi Brohi Goth
- Gulistan-e-Rafi
- Gulshan-e-Haroon
- Gulshan-e-Qadri
- Gulshan-e-Yousaf
- Haji Miandad Goth
- Hussainabad
- Jafar-e-Tayyar
- Jam Goth
- Kala Board
- Al-Amin Housing Society
- Darakhshan Housing Society
- Kausar Town
- Khokhra Par
- Khoso Goth
- Liaquat Market
- Aleemabad Society
- Jinnah Square
- Lyari Basti
- Memon Goth
- Model Colony
- Moinabad
- Mulla Essa Goth
- Nashtar Square
- Old Shafi Mohammed Goth
- Pak Kausar Town
- Raza Plaza
- Salar Goth
- Saudabad
- Shaban Town
- Taiser Town
- Urdu Nagar
- Asu Goth
- Soomar Kandani Village
- Malir Colony

== See also ==
- Malir Development Authority
- Malir (disambiguation)
- Malir River
- Malir District
- Malir Cantonment
- Malir Cantonment railway station
