= Bin Qasim, Karachi =

Administrative subdivision or town within Karachi, Pakistan

Coordinates: 24°55′28″N 66°58′25″E

Bin Qasim بن قاسم
- Subdivision of Malir District
- Interactive map of Bin Qasim
- Country: Pakistan
- Province: Sindh
- District: Malir District
- Division: Karachi
- Established: 14 August 2001

Government
  - Type: Sub-division (Tehsil)
  - Assistant Commissioner: NAD.E.ALI SHAH

Population (2023 Census of Pakistan)
  - Total: 322,915

Bin Qasim (Urdu: بن قاسم) is one of the six administrative sub-division (tehsil) within the Malir District of Karachi, Pakistan, lying in the eastern part of the city, north of Port Qasim.

== Location ==
Bin Qasim is located in the southeastern part of Karachi along the Arabian Sea and the Indus River delta. The town and the adjacent Port Qasim were named after Muhammad bin Qasim, the Arab general who conquered Sindh and Multan, establishing Islamic rule in the region in the eighth century CE. Bin Qasim was bordered by Gadap Town to the north, Thatta District and the Indus River to the east, the Arabian Sea to the south and the Malir River and the towns of Landhi, Malir, and Korangi Cantonment to the west.

== History ==
The federal government introduced local government reforms in the year 2000, which eliminated the previous "third tier of government" (administrative divisions) and replaced it with the fourth tier (districts). The effect in Karachi was the dissolution of the former Karachi Division, and the merging of its five districts to form a new Karachi City-District with eighteen autonomous constituent towns including Bin Qasim Town. In 2011, the system was disbanded but remained in place for bureaucratic administration until 2015, when the Karachi Metropolitan Corporation system was reintroduced. In 2015, Bin Qasim Town was re-organized as part of Malir District. In 2022 again (Local Election Act -2022 (amended)), it was removed as one of three "Town Municipal Corporations" of Malir District but remained as one of the six sub-division (tehsil).

== Bin Qasim Industrial Zone ==
The Bin Qasim Industrial Zone is one of the largest industrial areas in Karachi. It consists of more than 25,000 acres of land in the Port Qasim (Bin Qasim) area. Contained within this zone are many industrial units, ranging from medium to large in employment volume.

== Trade and industry ==
The port of Port Qasim was built in the 1970s to relieve pressure on the Port of Karachi and is today the second largest port of Pakistan. The port is surrounded by a large industrial area which includes the Pakistan Steel Mills complex, Pakistan Machine Tool Factory (PMTF), Toyota Indus, Pak Suzuki Motors, Lucky Motor, Engro Fertilizers, Master Motors, K-Electric, Lotte Chemical Pakistan, Zulfiqarabad Oil Terminal and hundreds of Large and Medium Size units operating in the area, as well as the nearby industrial estate in Landhi Town. The two neighbourhoods of Ibrahim Hyderi and Rehri are focussed on the fishing industry, complemented by the nearby Korangi Fish Harbour.

== Bin Qasim Railway Station ==
Bin Qasim railway station (Urdu: بن قاسم ریلوے اسٹیشن, Sindhi: بن قاسم ريلوي اسٽيشن) is located in Bin Qasim, Malir, Karachi.

== Education ==
Universities like, Textile Institute of Pakistan and SZABIST Gharo Campus are situated in the Bin Qasim subdivision of Malir District.

== Neighbourhoods of Bin Qasim, Karachi ==
- Gulshan-e-Hadeed
- Steel Town
- Shah Town
- Razzaqabad
- Abdullah Goth

== See also ==
- Port Qasim
- Pakistan Steel Mills
- Muhammad ibn al-Qasim
- Karachi Metropolitan Corporation
- Karachi Local Government
