= Karachi floods =

Karachi floods may refer to

- 2025 Karachi floods
- 2020 Karachi floods
- 2017 Karachi floods
- 2009 Karachi floods
