= 2020 Karachi floods =

Natural disaster in Pakistan

2020 Karachi Floods
- Date: 24 August 2020–27 August 2020
- Location: Karachi
- Cause: Moonsoon rains
- Deaths: 41

The 2020 Karachi floods (Urdu: سيلاب کراچی) were the worst flooding Karachi had seen in almost a century, and killed at least 41 people. The floods were caused by record monsoon rains from 24 to 27 August, which were inadequately drained by poorly maintained drainage systems in the city. The resulting floods caused deaths and destruction of infrastructure and properties in the city.

== Background and Details of the 2020 Karachi Floods ==
=== Flood Events in Pakistan ===
Flooding is Pakistan's most threatening natural disaster. There have been over 27 floods in Pakistan's history.

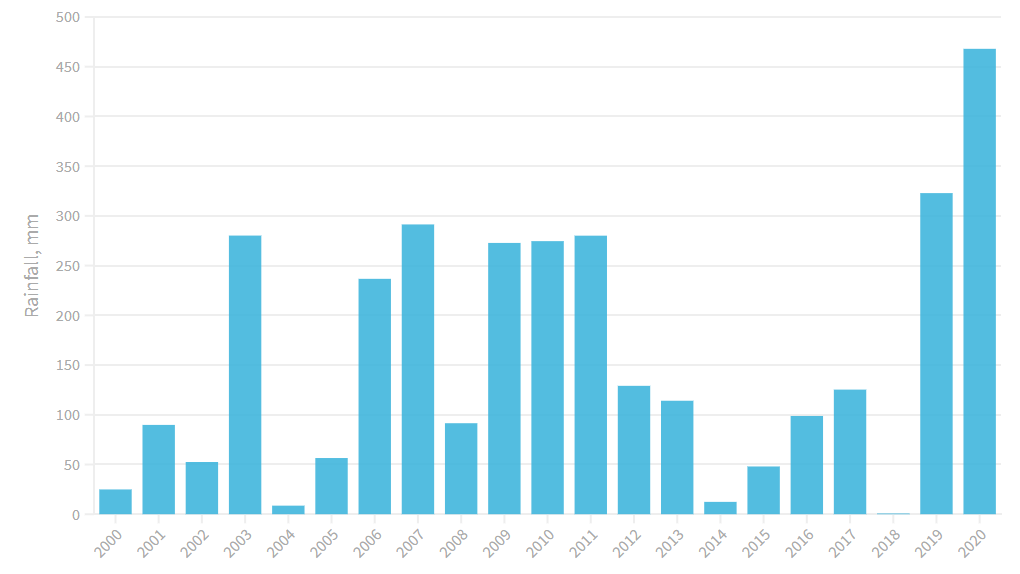
Rainfall in August in Karachi in the past 20 years

=== Common Causes of Flooding in Pakistan ===
The frequency of floods has been increasing over time. The causes of floods can be divided into factors affecting rainfall, and factors affecting water retention, such as drainage and deforestation. Climate change is the primary cause of the increasing trend in flooding frequency and severity in Pakistan.

=== 2020 Karachi Floods ===
It has been the worst flooding since 1931 in Karachi, killing at least 41 people and leaving hundreds of thousands trapped. The record monsoon rains with inadequate drainage systems in the city caused this flood. The heavy rainfalls shattered all-time records for rainfall in a single day and other records. During August 2020, 484 mm of rain fell and was the highest amount of rain in August back to 1931. The rainfall for a single day set a new record of 223.5 mm, surpassing the previous high of 211.3 mm set in 1967.

Landslides, infrastructure damage, and traffic jams caused by the floods disrupted the daily lives of around 15 million residents.

=== Urban Conditions in the Flood ===
Flooding engulfed the city, Karachi, bringing everything to a halt. There was a devastating damage to public infrastructures (such as broken electricity cables) and private properties (such as buildings collapsed). These damages also brought about a series of subsequent crises, with eight people dying in Karachi as a result of a wall collapse.

== Causes of the Floods ==
=== Deterioration of Drainage Channels ===
The damage of drains in Karachi, called nalas (such as Gujjar Nala) had been severe in recent years. Residents were buying solid waste and compacted it along nalas to protect their homes and this move reduced the width of the nala. In addition, since the only two landfills in Karachi at that time were far from the eastern city, lots of non-recyclable materials are thrown in to nalas. As the development plan of Karachi was not implemented, the pressure of insufficient space for commercial activities forced the government to build bazaars over the nalas.

=== Vast Population Increase and Lack of Development in Sewers ===
As the population of Karachi increased and the city expanded, the construction of various sectors is became far away from the gutter garden, which is one part of Karachi's sewage system. A planned sewage treatment plant was never built for these new sectors.

=== Real Estate Development ===
Due to the large-scale real estate development, many natural drainage channels and water collection depressions had been dismantled in the hilly formations north of the city. When it rains, the south of the area is completely flooded.

=== Serious Institutional Issues ===
The central and provincial governments of Karachi were controlled by different political parties and their views cannot be unified to solve the infrastructure problems of Karachi furthermore government even failed to get sufficient investment to deal with drainage trouble.

== Types of Response ==
=== Local strategies ===
==== Local Government ====
In response to the catastrophic floods in Karachi, then Sindh Chief Minister Murad Ali Shah ordered that schools be used as resettlement sites for the displaced families. According to the Sindh Health Department, the health department sprayed disinfectants to eliminate larvae to avert dengue and malaria epidemics after the massive floods.

==== Pakistani Army & Other National Authority ====
The Pakistani army was also summoned to Karachi on July 30, 2020, to aid the civil authorities in addressing the city's flooding problem. Meanwhile, the Pakistan Army also collaborated with the local National Disaster Management Authority (NDMA) and Frontier Works Organization (FWO)to relief Karachi residents who had been affected by the monsoon rains. Additionally, they were also entrusted with cleaning up the debris left by the city's floods. The Emergency Response Force (ERF) was also sent to help persons in need in many sites around Karachi on 20 August 2020.

=== International Assistance ===
==== Baitulmaal Response ====
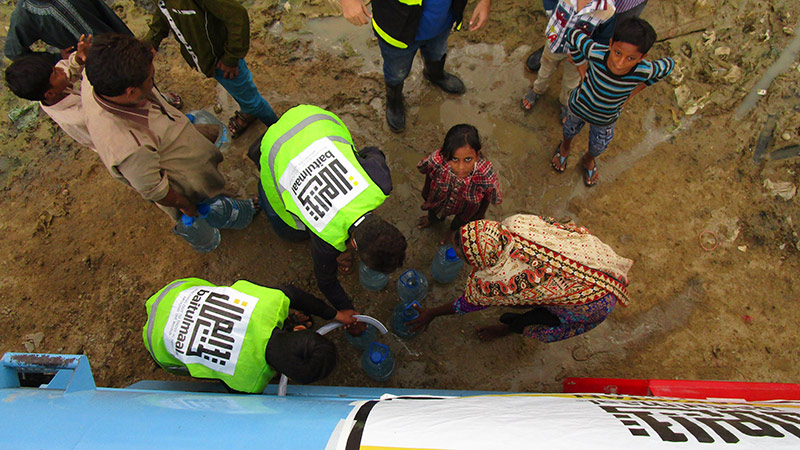
Baitulmaal staffs provided Karachi residents water.

Local rescuers assisted by Baitulmaal (a Dallas-based international humanitarian organization) helped evacuate surviving residents of Karachi's Gulberg Town. The team provided them with hot meals, water, hygiene supplies, and food parcels and provided drinking water to other flood-affected areas of Karachi, such as Yousuf Goth and Abdullah Town. Employees of Baitulmaal delivered supplies via truck to individuals who were unable to escape in time.

==== WFP Response ====
The World Food Programme (WFP) also responded to the unprecedented floods by supplying 95 MT of food aid to 1,780 affected households in Karachi on 22 September 2020.

==== Other International Organization ====
During the Karachi floods, the Pakistan Red Crescent Society (PRCS) worked closely with International organization such as the International Committee of Red Cross (ICRC), the German Red Cross (GRC), the Norwegian Red Cross (NorCross), and the Turkish Red Crescent (TRCS) to give a timely response to Karachi's impacted citizens.

== Impact of the Floods ==
=== Physical Impact ===
The floods caused enormous physical damage to the area. Heavy rainfall caused flooding in Karachi, inundation of streets, houses and outdated urban drainage systems, and collapse of lines, resulting in large-scale power failure in the city. 23 houses were partially damaged and 1 house was completely damaged. The Pakistan government also reported that nearly 1 million acres of crops were destroyed by the floods. The fields of cotton, vegetables, onions, tomatoes, and sugarcane were affected. In addition, the rainstorm destroyed the main infrastructure of the city and made the highway network impassable. The entire residential area and market were flooded, causing losses worth millions of rupees to houses and enterprises.

=== Immediate Mortality and Morbidity Implications ===
The floods in Karachi pose a threat to people's lives, not only causing casualties, but also contributing to the spread of disease. The flood caused at least 34 people were killed, nine were injured. Meanwhile, it increased the risk of Dengue fever outbreak due to poor flood control and water treatment facilities, and many cases have been reported after the flood outbreak. COVID-19 pandemic was also being controlled by health authorities at the same time.

== Health Consequences ==
=== Short-term Consequences ===
In 2020, the province of Sindh had reported 733 cases of dengue in the first 8 months, with about 92% of the cases being reported in Karachi. At least 10 more dengue cases had been reported in the city during flood. COVID-related disruptions severely impeding diagnosis and treatment of the diseases, access to relief from floods as well as affordability of mosquito nets.

Studies have shown that the amount of rainfall is the single most crucial factor for dengue virus transmission. Water retained on rooftops and containers after heavy rain episodes become the ideal breeding spots for Aedes mosquitoes, which unfortunately, was also the source of drinking water for refugees due to unavailability of water. Different water and vector borne diseases had already emerged after heavy flooding, such as dengue, malaria, diarrhea, typhoid and hepatitis.

=== Long-term Consequences ===
Mortality rates were found to increase by up to 50% in the first year post-flood.

== See also ==
- Climate of Karachi
- 2009 Karachi floods
- 2017 Karachi floods
