= Abdullah Goth =

Neighborhood in Karachi, Pakistan

Coordinates: 32°20′N 71°55′E

Abdullah Goth (Urdu: عبد الله گوٹھ) is one of the neighbourhoods of Ibrahim Hyderi town within the Malir District in Karachi, Sindh, Pakistan.

Abdullah Goth is located in front of Shah latif town and close to Steel Town, Quaidabad and Port Qasim.
