= Thado Nallo =

River in Pakistan

Thado Nalo is a stream that passes through the city of Karachi, Sindh, Pakistan from northeast to the south and drains into the Malir River which empties into Arabian Sea.

== See also ==
- Malir Town
- Malir River
- Sona Nala
- Gogni Nala
