= Landhi Dairy Colony =

Buffalo colony in Karachi, Pakistan

Landhi Dairy Colony (also known as Bhains Colony or Landhi Cattle Colony) is the world's largest buffalo colony, located in Malir District in Karachi, Sindh, Pakistan. Bhains Colony regularly supplies more than 80% of the milk in Karachi. The New Zealand Agency for International Development funded a pilot scheme to turn animal waste into energy and fertilizer. According to the NZAID website, the project is "designed to bring substantial economic and environmental benefits to the people of Landhi". The purpose of the project was not only to curb the "pollution problem caused by animal waste, but also to lift the living standards and improve the environment of the local people."

== History ==
The Landhi Dairy Colony (LDC) is located in the suburbs of Karachi. It was established in 1958 within an area of 752 acres (3.04 km^{2}) for 15,000 animals.

Today, it has about 1,500 farms spread over 1,600 acres (6.5 km^{2}). It has a dairy animal population of about 400,000 (around 95% buffaloes and 5% cows, as well as an unknown number of sheep and goats), with a daily yield of about four million litres of milk and 7,200 tones of dung, making it the world's largest dairy colony. Buffaloes are the biggest source of milk here, just as they are in the rest of Pakistan. Individual farmers often own up to 200 animals each.

The majority of the milking animals in LDC are kept only for one lactation phase and consequently approximately 10 to 12 percent of the population is replaced every month. After the lactation period, the majority of the animals are sold to breeders or for slaughter and only a few are kept by the dairy farmers for re-breeding. Most of the animals are brought to and from the animal rich districts of Punjab and Sindh.

== Waste to energy project ==
The first gobar (cow dung) gas-fired power plant (25 MW) in Landhi Bhains Colony is on the cards. This will not only take care of a part of the colony's dung - turning a negative feature into a positive one - but also yield 1,500 tons of natural fertilizer daily.

The project will resolve a significant environmental problem and simultaneously produce badly needed electricity in the city of Karachi, which is an immediate and pressing need. The importance and scale of the project is underscored by the inauguration of the project by H.E. Mr. Phil Goff, Minister for Trade of the Government of New Zealand together with the Karachi City Nazim, Syed Mustafa Kamal.

On 15 April 2007, the inauguration of a project to convert the animal waste to fuel and fertilizer took place. The cattle produce 7,200 tons of waste per day; the lack of treatment caused enormous problems. The project prevented the dumping of waste in the sea and instead used the dung to produce methane gas for power generation (25 MW) as well as producing 1,400 tons of dried fertilizer per day.

Syed Feroz Shah, the director of the National Engineer Corporation in a joint briefing with Tony Woods and Ann McLean of Empower Consultants said it was the second ever Carbon credit project for Pakistan.

The project started in 2005 when NZAID provided up to $500,000 in funding. According to Phil Goff, after the inauguration of the project in April 2007, the "New Zealand organisations and others that have played a central role in developing this important project can be justly proud of their achievement and the project will also add another important dimension to our growing bilateral relationship with Pakistan”

== Other cattle colonies in Karachi ==
- Al-Momin Dairy Farming Society, Gadap Town
- Nagori Cattle Colony, Super Highway
- Surjani Cattle Colony, New Karachi Town
- Bilal Cattle Colony, Korangi Industrial Area
- Saif Cattle Colony, Gulshan-e-Hadeed.
