= Malir (disambiguation) =

Malir is a town in Karachi, Pakistan

Malir may also refer to:

- Malir District, an administrative unit of Sindh, Pakistan
- Malir River, a river in Pakistan
- Malir Cantonment, a cantonment in Pakistan
- Malir River Bridge, a bridge in Pakistan
- Malir railway station, a railway station in Pakistan
- Malir Development Authority, a development authority of Malir District
