= Gogni Nala =

River in Pakistan

Coordinates: 24°52′N 66°52′E

Gogni Nala is a stream that passes through Kiamari Town, Karachi, Sindh, Pakistan from northeast to the south and drains into the Arabian Sea.

== See also ==
- Malir Town
- Malir River
- Sona Nala
- Thado Nallo
