= Kala Board =

Neighborhood in Pakistan

Kala Board (Urdu: کالا بورڈ) is a neighborhood in Karachi, Pakistan, that is within Malir District. The areas included in this Union Council are: from Kalaboard & Malir City 15 to A-area, B-area, Liaquat Market G-area, Muhabbat Nagar, Baraf Khana, Darakhshan Society, Al-Ameen Society, till Laal Masjid C-area.

There are several ethnic groups in Kala Board including Muhajirs, Punjabis, Sindhis, Kashmiris, Seraikis, Pakhtuns, Balochis, Memons, Bohras, Ismailis, etc. Over 99% of the population is Muslim. The population of Malir Town is estimated to be nearly one million
