= Ayub Shah Bukhari =

Ayub Shah Bukhari was a Sufi master in Gulshan-e-Maymar neighbourhood of Gadap Town in Karachi, Sindh, Pakistan. The Sufi shrine of Ayub Shah Bukhari is also located in Gulshan-e-Maymar.

On January 6, 2014, six corpses were recovered near the shrine of Ayub Shah Bukhari on the outskirts of Karachi. Bukhari is revered as a saint by followers of Sufism. The Tehrik-e-Taliban, who follow a very strict interpretation of Islam, consider shrine worshipping and Grave worshiping as un-Islamic and have mounted attacks on Sufi shrines and pilgrims who visit these shrines. Talibans claimed responsibility for slaying the six people in a note found by police near the bodies. Three of the dead were custodians of the Sufi saint Ayub Shah Shrine, while the remaining three came from various parts of Karachi.

== See also ==
- Islam in Karachi
- Sufism in Karachi
- Abdullah Shah Ghazi
