= Khokhra Par =

Khokhra Par may refer to:

- Khokhropar, or Khokhrapar, a town in Sindh, Pakistan, near the Indian border
- Khokhra Par, Karachi, a neighborhood in Karachi, Pakistan
