= Tayyar =

Tayyar is a Turkish given name and may refer to:

- Tayyar Yalaz (1901-1943), Turkish sport wrestler
- Jafar-e-Tayyar, one of the neighbourhoods of Malir Town in Karachi, Sindh, Pakistan

Surname:

- Şamil Tayyar
- Nasser al-Tayyar
