= Animal husbandry in Pakistan =

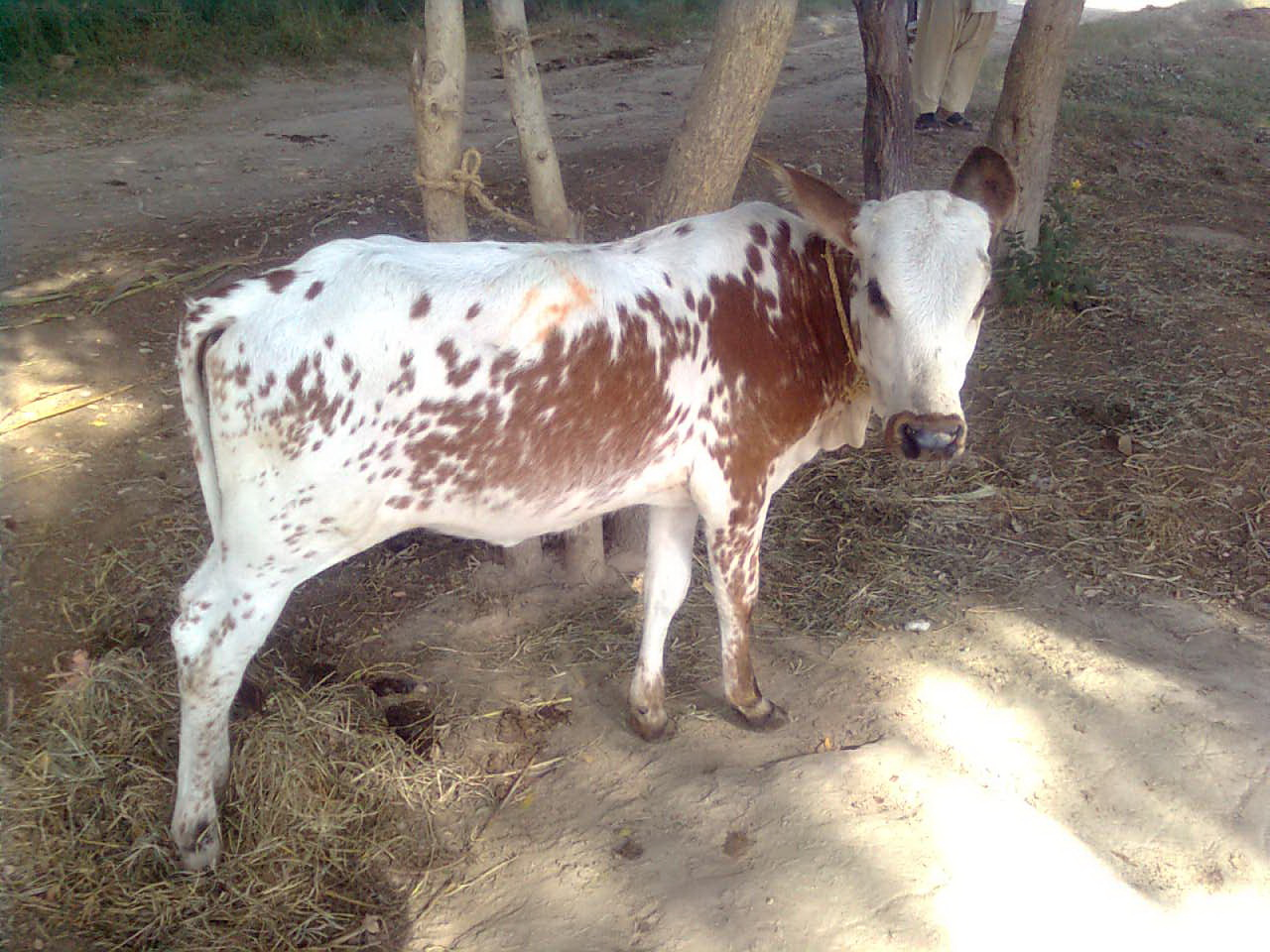
A cow in a Punjabi farm in rural Pakistan

Being a country that has a largely rural and agriculture-based industry, animal husbandry plays an important role in the economy of Pakistan and is a major source of livelihood for many farmers. Between 30 and 35 million people in Pakistan's current labour force are estimated to be engaged in livestock rearing. While the agricultural practice is prevalent throughout the country, it is more common in the fertile provinces of Punjab and Sindh, which are traditionally the main areas of agriculture and farming activity. In 2020, the livestock industry contributed 60.6% to the country's overall agriculture and 11.7% to the national GDP.

As of 2020, there were approximately 41.2 million buffaloes, 49.6 million cattle, 5.4 million donkeys, 78.2 million goats and 30.9 million sheep in Pakistan. Commercial poultry numbered 170.1 million broilers and 10.36 million layers in 1999. There were also 108 million domesticated poultry kept by people.

Sheep differ widely throughout the grazing lands of central and northern Pakistan. Their wool is exported in large quantities. Among local cow breeds, the most notable are the Red Sindhi cattle and the Sahiwal breed, used widely for milk and dairy production. Dung excreted by cattle is a vital resource for supplying cooking fuel and soil fertilizers.

The production of dairy products such as milk, ice cream, cheese and butter is carried out by dairy plants. From 1984 to 1990, national milk production rose 41%, while meat production surged by 48%.

Animals are also widely used for transport in Pakistan, especially in the rural areas; the most commonly used animals are camels, donkeys and bullocks. Challenges faced by modern poultry in Pakistan include high mortality rates and incidence of disease among chicks as well as an inefficient marketing system. The livestock industry remains neglected and underdeveloped when compared to its full socio-economic potential. The government of Pakistan has been embarking on various development projects, with the assistance of the Asian Development Bank, to improve the livestock industry and its efficiency.

== See also ==
- Landhi Dairy Colony
