= Shah Town =

Neighbourhood of Karachi, Pakistan

Coordinates: 24°51′10″N 67°20′00″E

Shah Town is one of the neighbourhoods in the Bin Qasim sub-division (tehsil) of Malir District, Karachi.

There are mostly Sindhi and Urdu speaking inhabitants in Shah Town, including Urdu speakers, Sindhis, Kashmiris, Seraikis, Pakhtuns, Balochs, Brahuis, Memons, Bohras, Christians and Ismailis. Shah Town is a (3,000 ha) residential area located opposite Steel Town and consists of two parts, Phase 1 and Phase 2. Serial numbers for houses are managed as "SR".l
