= Sona Nala =

Coordinates: 24°52′N 66°52′E

Sona Nala is a stream that passes in Hawke's Bay Town, Karachi, Sindh, Pakistan from northeast to the south and drains into the Arabian Sea.

== See also ==
- Malir Town
- Malir River
- Gogni Nala
