= Ghausia Colony =

Coordinates: 31°31′N 74°18′E

Ghausia Colony (Urdu: غوثیہ کالونی) is one of the neighborhoods of Malir Town in Karachi, Sindh, Pakistan. It is named after Shaykh Abd al Qadir also known as 'Ghawth ath Thaqlayn'.

There are several ethnic groups in Malir Town including Punjabis, Sindhis, Kashmiris, Seraikis, Pakhtuns, Balochs, Memons, Bohras and Ismailis.
