= Ibrahim Hyderi Town =

Town in Sindh, Pakistan

Ibrahim Hyderi Town ابراہیم حیدری ابراہیم حیدری
- Subdivision of Malir District/Constituent Town of Karachi
- Country: Pakistan
- Province: Sindh
- Division: Karachi
- District: Malir District
- Established: 2022
- Union Councils: 11: UC1- Chaukhandi UC2- Shah Latif Town UC3- Cattle Colony UC4- Majeed Colony UC5- Muzzaffarabad UC6- Muslimabad UC7- Sher Pao colony UC8- Ibrahim Hyderi UC9- Chashma UC10- Rehri Goth UC11- Ali Akber Shah

Government
  - Type: Subdivision (Tehsil)/TMC
  - Assistant Commissioner: Ms. Saira
  - TMC, Chairman: Allo Chariya

Population (2023 Census of Pakistan)
  - Total: 1,341,638
- Website: https://tmcibrahimhydri.gos.pk/

Ibrahim Hyderi Town (Urdu: ابراہیم حیدری) is an administrative subdivision (tehsil) and a constituent town of Malir District. It was part of Bin Qasim, but in 2022 became one of the three towns (Town Municipal Corporation (TMC)) under Malir District, the other two being Gadap Town and Malir Town.

== Town Municipal Committee ==
As per the Sindh Local Government Act, 2021, Sindh government replaced the previous seven District Municipal Corporations (DMCs) with 26 towns, each with its own municipal committee. Malir District has three towns.

- Gadap Town
- Malir Town
- Ibrahim Hyderi Town

== History ==
Town Municipal Corporation (TMC) Ibrahim Hyderi is located within the Malir District, one of Karachi's seven districts, comprising upon eleven (11) Union Committees. It serves as the local governing body responsible for municipal services, local governance, and infrastructure development.

There are several ethnic groups in Ibrahim Haidery including Sindhis,Kutchi, Balochs, Brahuis, and Memons. Over 85% of the population is Muslim.

== Fish harbour ==
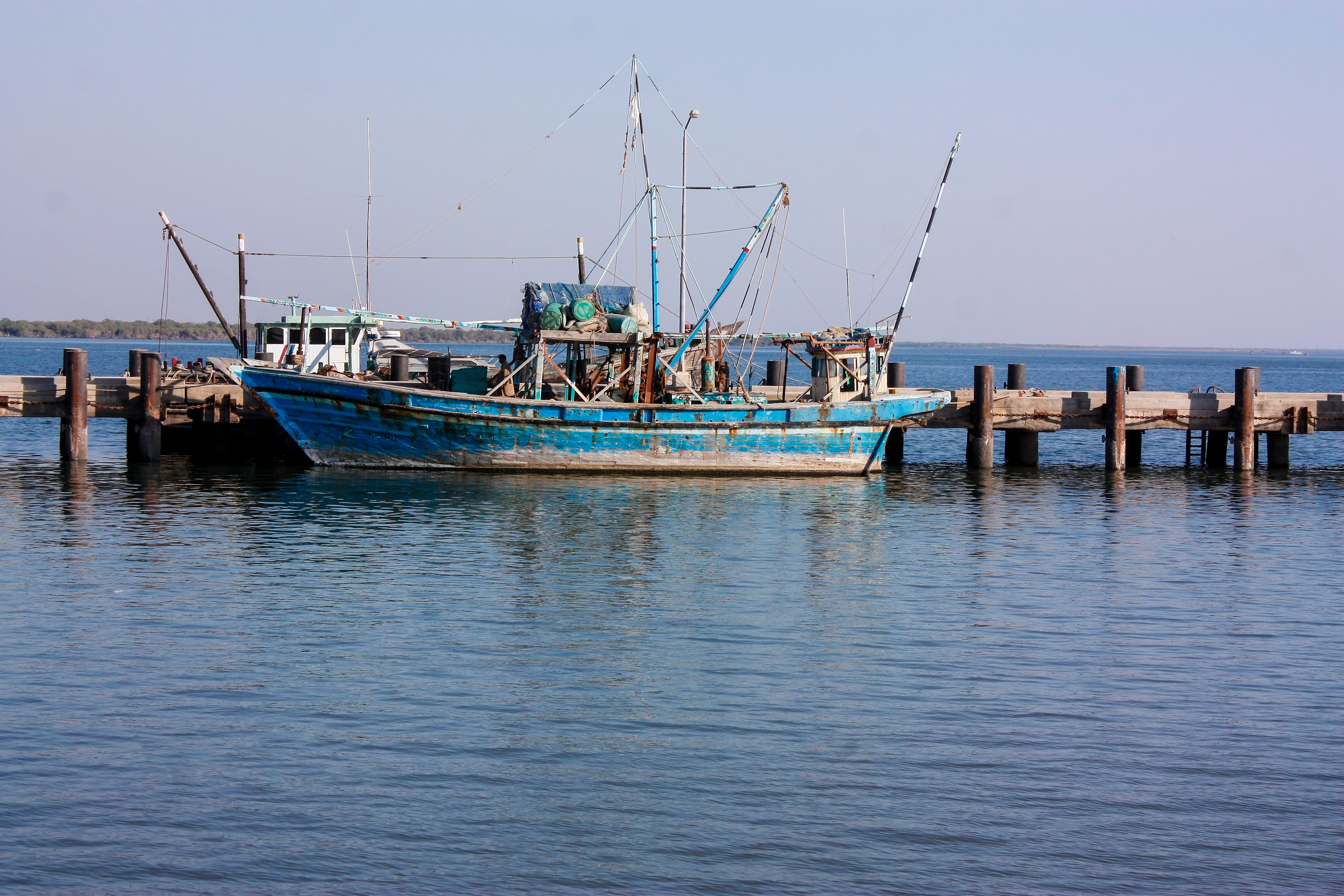
A fishing boat at the Ibrahim Hyderi fish harbour

Ibrahim Hyderi is also a village of fishermen as well a fish harbour with many jetties for the fishermen and their boats. The fish is processed and sent to markets and bazaars in Karachi.

== Neighbourhoods of Ibrahim Hyderi, Karachi ==
- Shah Latif Town
- Cattle Colony
- Rehri Goth
- Sherpao Colony
- Chaukhandi
- Razzaqabad

== See also ==
- PAF Korangi Creek Base
- Bin Qasim
