= Cattle Colony =

Neighbourhood in Karachi, Pakistan

Cattle Colony بھینس کالونی
- Neighborhood
- Country: Pakistan
- Province: Sindh
- City: Karachi
- District: Malir District
- Subdivision/Tehsil: Ibrahim Hyderi
- Union Council: Cattle colony (U.C.03), Ibrahim Hyderi Town

Government
  - UC Chairman: Abdul Sattar Himayatti (PPP)

Population (2023 Census of Pakistan)
  - Total: 1,341,638 (population of Ibrahim Hyderi including Cattle Colony)
- Demonym: Karachiite
- Time zone: UTC+05:00 (PST)

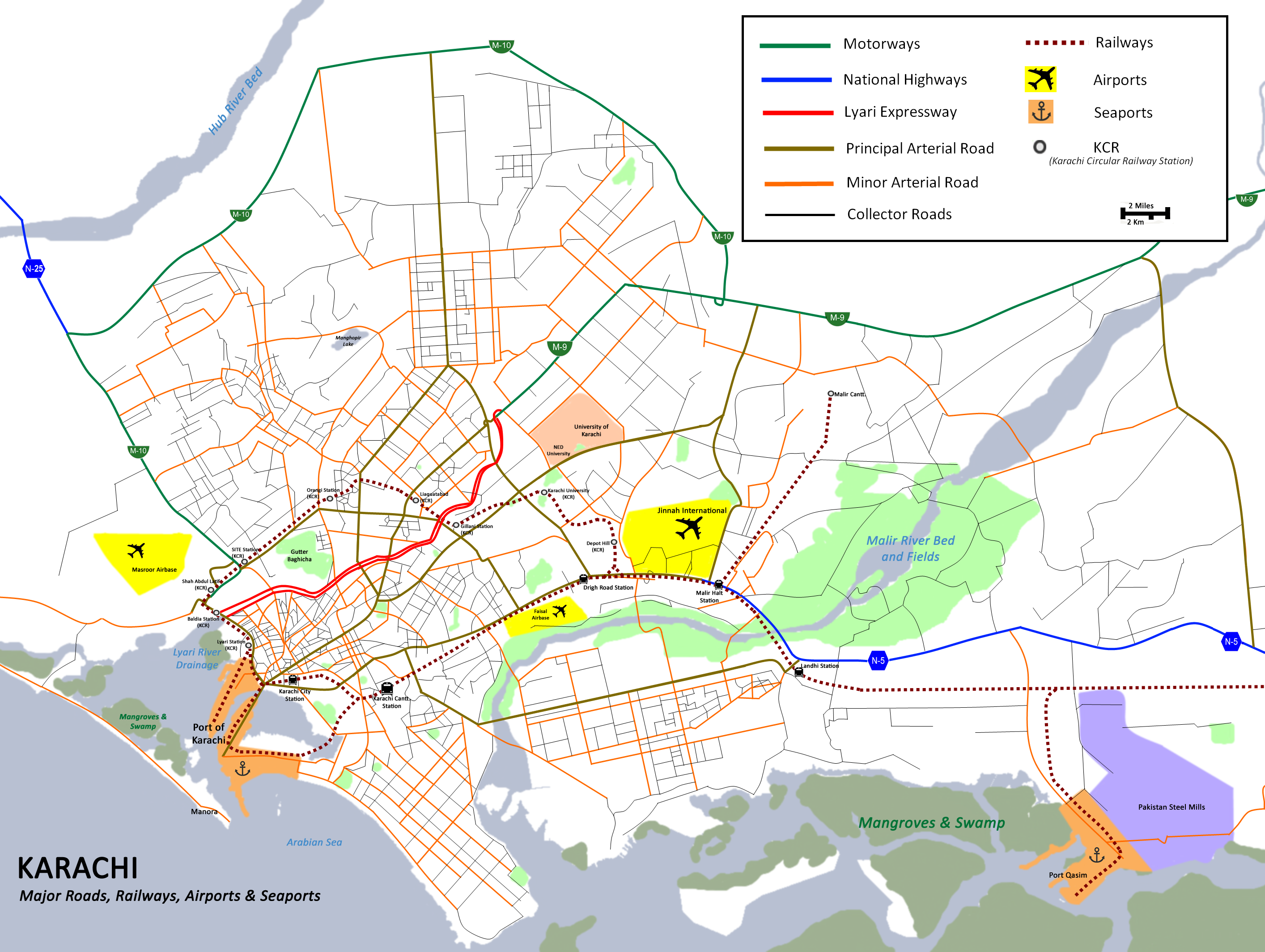
Location of Cattle Colony in Karachi

Cattle Colony (Urdu: بھینس کالونی) also known as Bhains Colony, is a residential neighbourhood in Ibrahim hyderi sub-division (tehsil) of Malir District in Karachi, Pakistan.

This neighbourhood of Karachi is the centre of cattle and meat trade as well as of dairy products in Karachi. Many slaughterhouses and meat warehouses are also located in the Cattle Colony.

== Demography ==
The ethnic groups in Cattle Colony include Sindhis, Muhajir, Punjabis, Kashmiris, Seraikis, Pakhtuns, Balochs, Brahuis, Memons.
