= Shah Latif Town =

Neighbourhood in Karachi, Pakistan

Shah Latif Town شاہ لطیف ٹاؤن
- Neighborhood
- Interactive map of Shah Latif Town
- Coordinates: 24°51′03″N 67°16′14″E
- Country: Pakistan
- Province: Sindh
- City: Karachi
- District: Malir District
- Subdivision/Tehsil: Ibrahim Hyderi
- Union Council: Shah Latif Town (U.C.02) is within Ibrahim Hyderi Town

Government
  - UC Chairman: Khuwaj Muhammad tanoli (JIP)

Population (2023 Census of Pakistan)
  - Total: 1,341,638 (population of Ibrahim Hyderi including Shah Latif Town)
- Demonym: Karachiite
- Time zone: UTC+05:00 (PST)

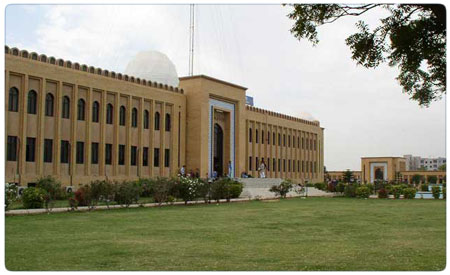
FAST NUCES main campus of Karachi located in sector 17-D of Shah Latif Town at National Highway.

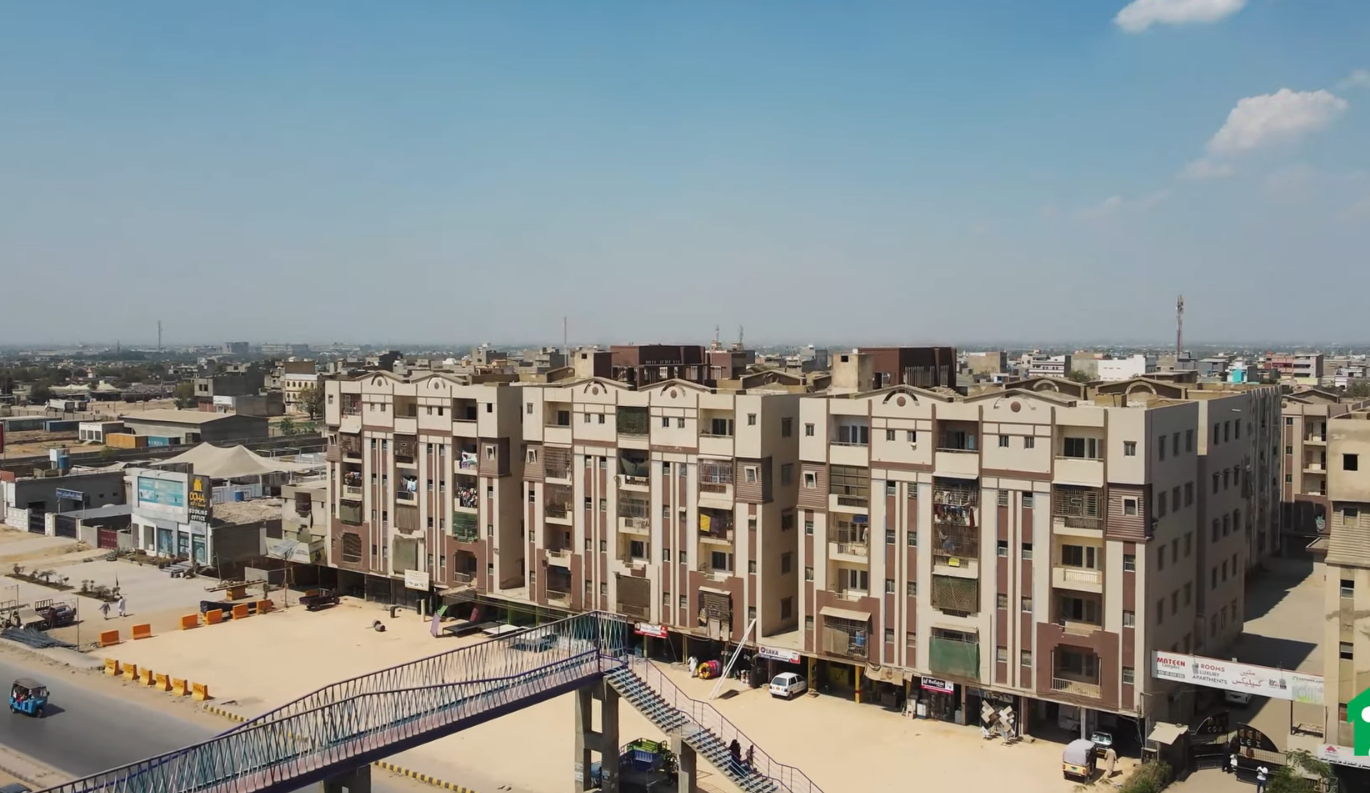
Mateen Complex Apartments In sector 19-A of Shah Latif Town

Shah Latif Town (Sindhi: شاہ لطیف ٹاؤن) is one of the neighbourhoods in Ibrahim Hyderi Town within Malir District of Karachi, Pakistan.

Demographics:

There are several ethnic groups in Shah latif town including ,Sindhis, Mashori, Punjabis, Kashmiris, Siraiki, Pakhtun, Balochi, Birohi, Memon, Muhajir, Nagoris, Gujjars and Ismailis. Over 93 percent population is Muslim, with Christian making up around 5 percent and remaining population are based on Hindus and Sikhs. Shah latif town is considered one of the diverse town of Karachi.

Town planning:

Shah Latif Town was planned under KDA scheme No.25 in late 1970s. In 1993, administrative control of the 500-acre project was transferred to the Malir Development Authority (MDA), which currently oversees and manages the town's development and legal framework. Shah Latif town is divided into several sectors, each equipped with its own commercial markets and parks. The town boasts a well planned road network that connects it to other parts of Karachi Residents have access to essential utilities such as water, electricity, and gas. The area offers a range of housing options, from small apartments to large villas, catering to different income groups.

Location:

This is a large town side by side of National highway N-5 and nears to Port Qasim Industrial Estate, Steel town, Quiadabad and also 15 minutes driving to Karachi's Jinnah international Airport. Malir expressway is just 8 minutes drive by Shah Latif Town.

Education:

Shah Latif Town has several private schools and coaching centers providing quality education. Well-known schools include Al Hamra secondary school, The Educators, and Dar-e-Arqam, while FAST National University Karachi campus is also located in Sector 17-D along the National Highway, adding to the town's educational importance.
