= Razzaqabad =

Neighborhood of Liaquatabad Town in Karachi, Sindh, Pakistan

Coordinates: 32°20′N 71°55′E

Razzaqabad is one of the neighborhoods of Bin Qasim subdivision (Tehsil) of Malir District in Karachi, Sindh, Pakistan.

== Demography ==
There are several ethnic groups in Razzaqabad including Urdu, Sindhis, Muhajir, Punjabis, Kashmiris, Seraikis, Pakhtuns, Balochs, Brahuis, Memons etc.
