= Malir Colony railway station =

Railway station in Sindh, Pakistan

Coordinates: 24.8835°N 67.1747°E

Malir Colony Station ملیر کالونی اسٹیشن
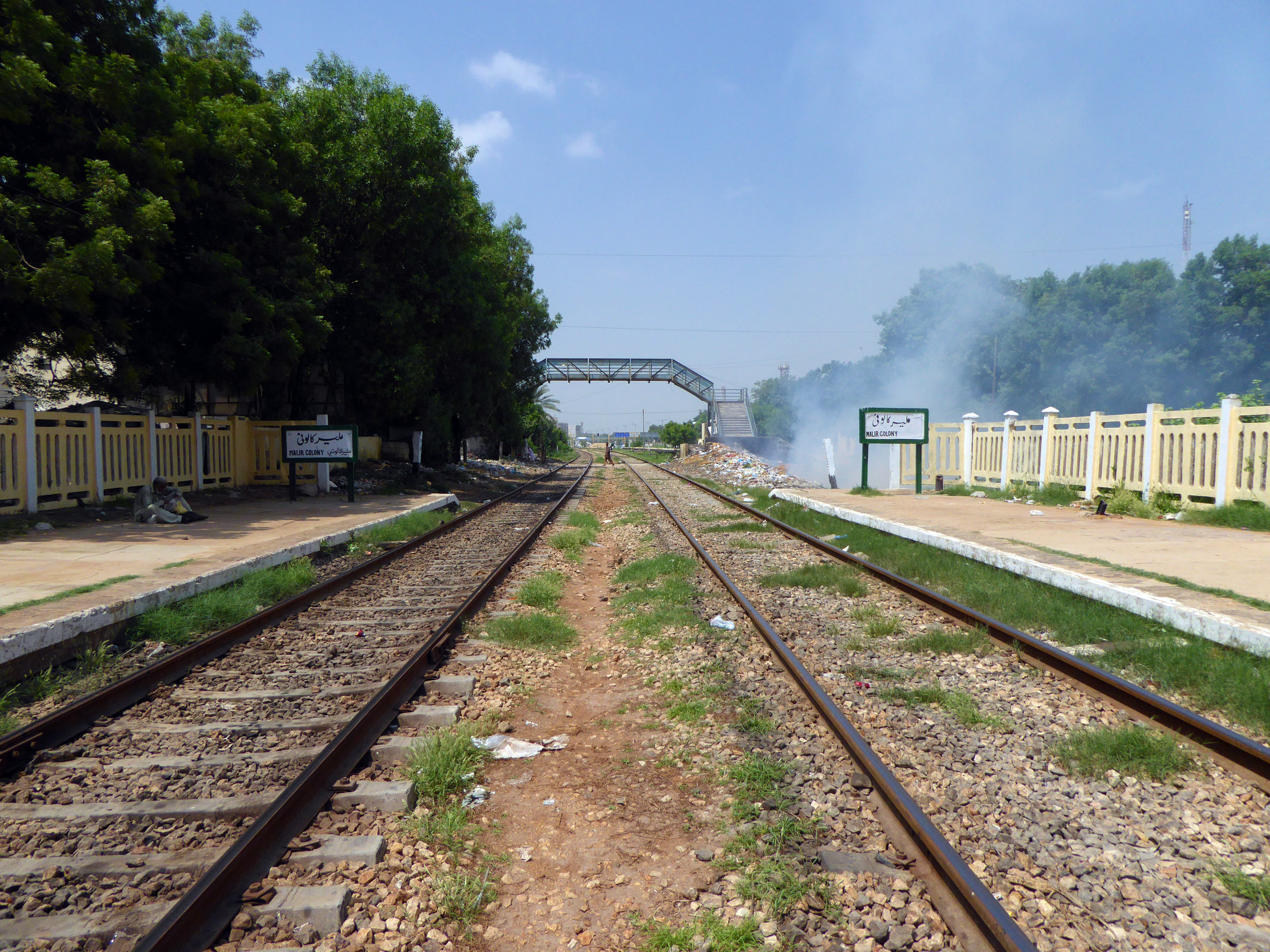
- View of main line platforms

General information
- Owner: Ministry of Railways
- Line: Karachi Circular Railway
- Platforms: 3
- Tracks: 3

Construction
- Platform levels: 1

Other information
- Station code: MXBH

Services
Preceding station	Karachi Circular Railway	Following station
Malir Terminus	Malir line	Malir Cantonment Terminus
Location

Malir Colony Railway Station (Urdu: ملیر کالونی ریلوے اسٹیشن, Sindhi: ملير ڪالوني ريلوي اسٽيشن) is located in Malir Colony, Karachi, Pakistan.

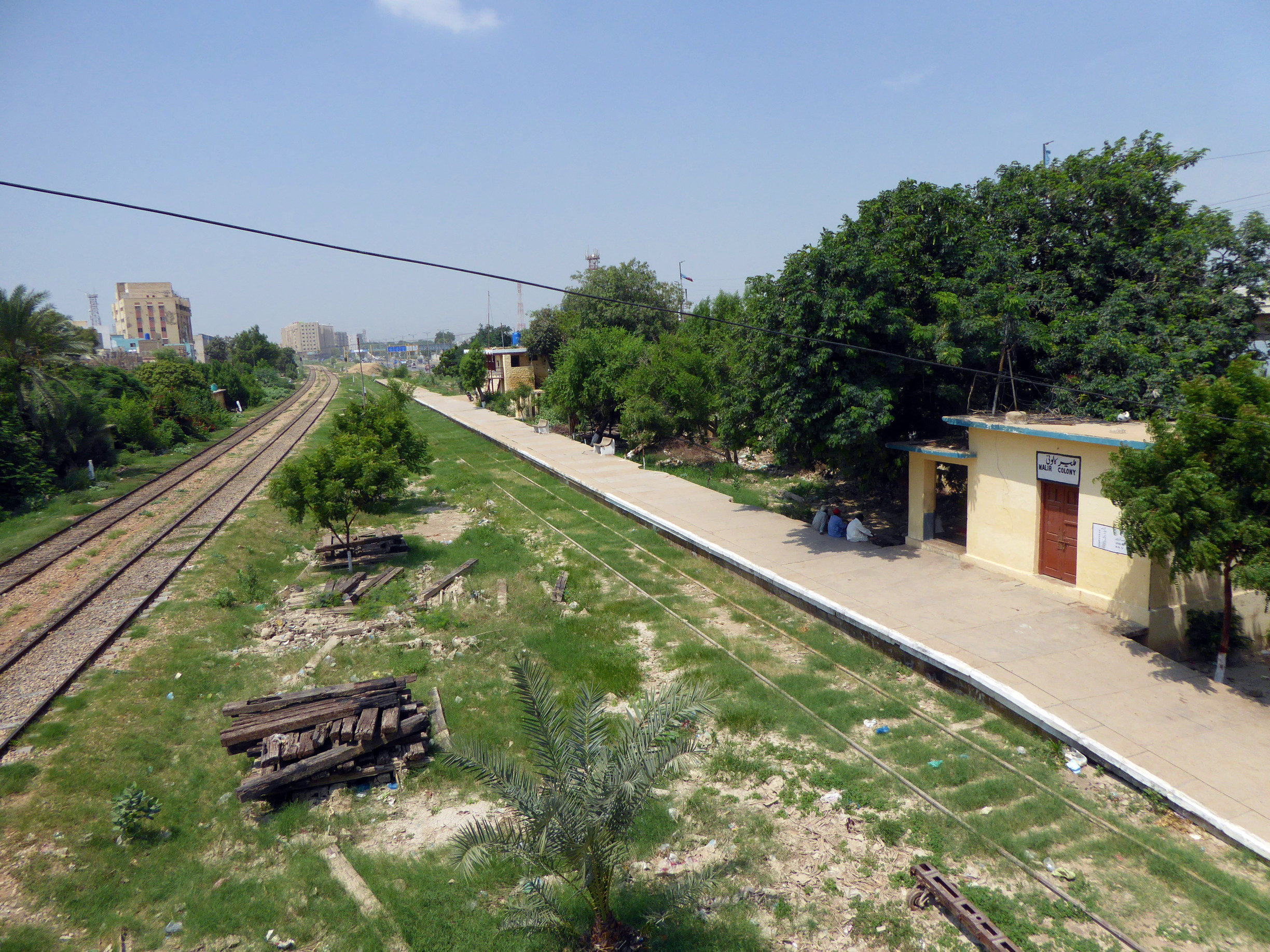
Malir Colony railway station, view of Karachi Circular Railway platform

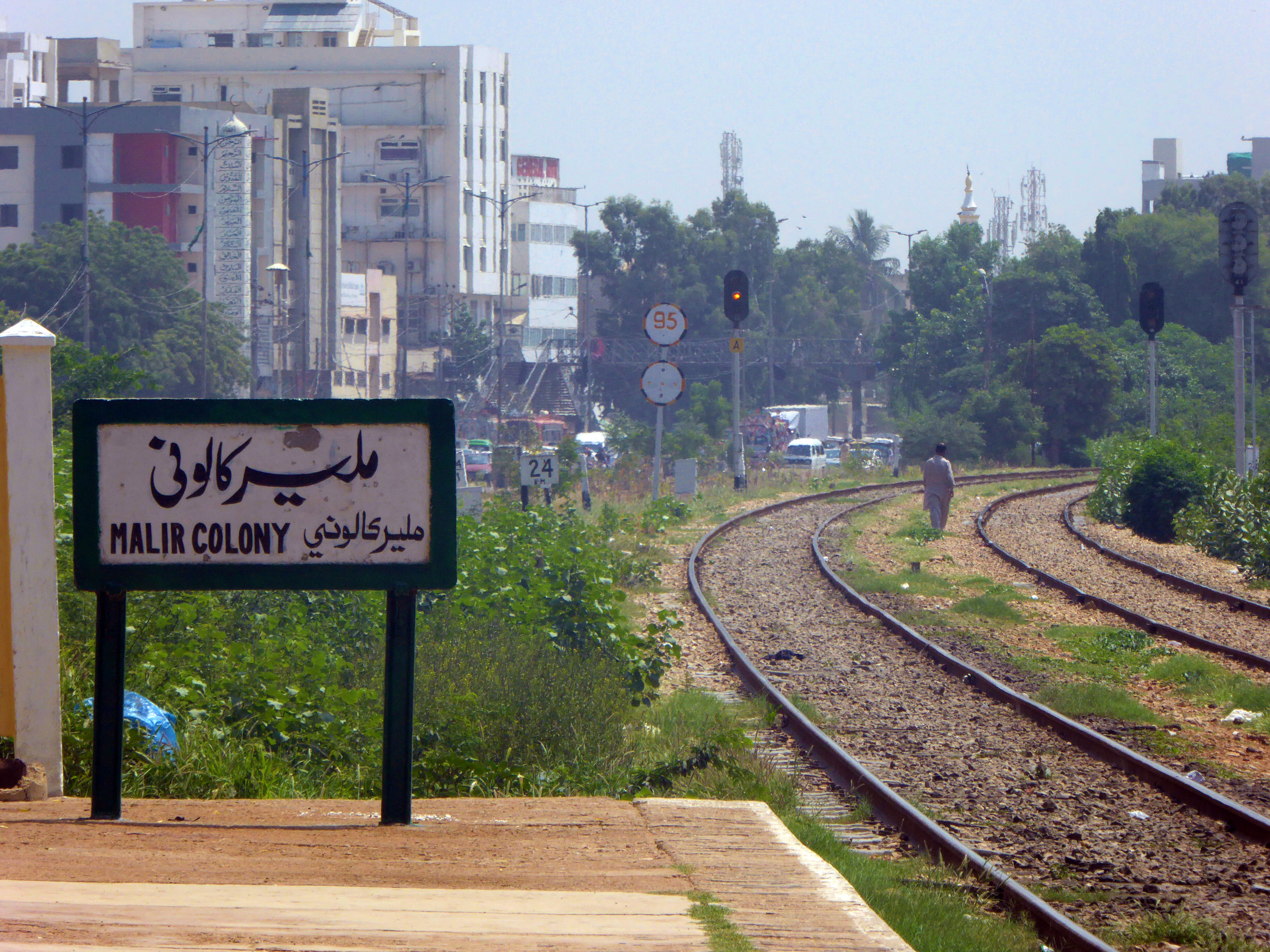
Malir Colony railway station, view from end of main line platform

== See also ==
- List of railway stations in Pakistan
- Pakistan Railways
