= Malir River Bridge =

Bridge in Karachi, Pakistan

- Coordinates: 24°52′17″N 67°08′46″E
- Carries: 6 lanes
- Crosses: Malir River
- Locale: Karachi
- Official name: Malir River Bridge

Characteristics
- Design: concrete
- Total length: 5,000 metres (16,000 ft)
- Width: 19 metres (62 ft)
- Longest span: 30 metres (98 ft)

History
- Designer: A.A. Associates
- Opened: 4 February 2009

Location
- Interactive map of Malir River Bridge

The Malir River Bridge (Urdu: ملير ريور برج) is to date Pakistan's largest bridge which spans 5,000 metres (16,000 ft). This bridge was inaugurated by Governor of Sindh Dr Ishrat ul Ibad on Wednesday 4 February 2009. The cost of the bridge is PKR 1.2 billion or USD 14 million funded by the Government of Pakistan.

The bridge has shortened the distance by 28 kilometres (17 mi) for the residents of Korangi, Landhi and Shah Faisal Town. To enable construction 42 houses were demolished and the owners were compensated by the government.
