= Steel Town (Karachi) =

Administrative sub-division or town in Karachi, Sindh, Pakistan

Coordinates: 24°52′N 67°20′E

Steel Town اسٹیل ٹاؤن
- Residential Area
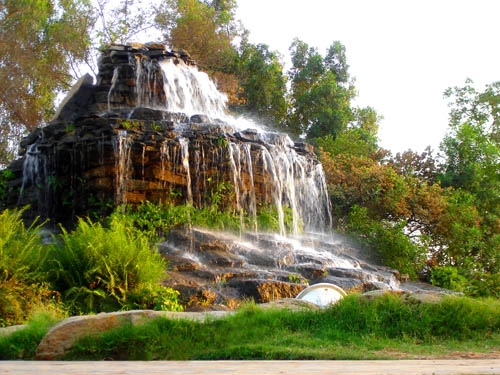
- Steel Town, Quaid-e-Azam Park Fountain
- Country: Pakistan
- Province: Sindh
- City: Karachi
- District: Malir District
- Subdivision/Tehsil: Bin Qasim
- Union Council: Steel Town (U.C.05) Gadap Town

Government
  - UC Chairman: Ghulam Raza Jatoi (PPP)
  - Vice Chairman: Ameen Din Jokhio

Population (2023 Census of Pakistan)
  - Total: 322,915 (population of Bin Qasim including Steel Town).
- Time zone: UTC+05:00 (PST)
- Postal code: 75010

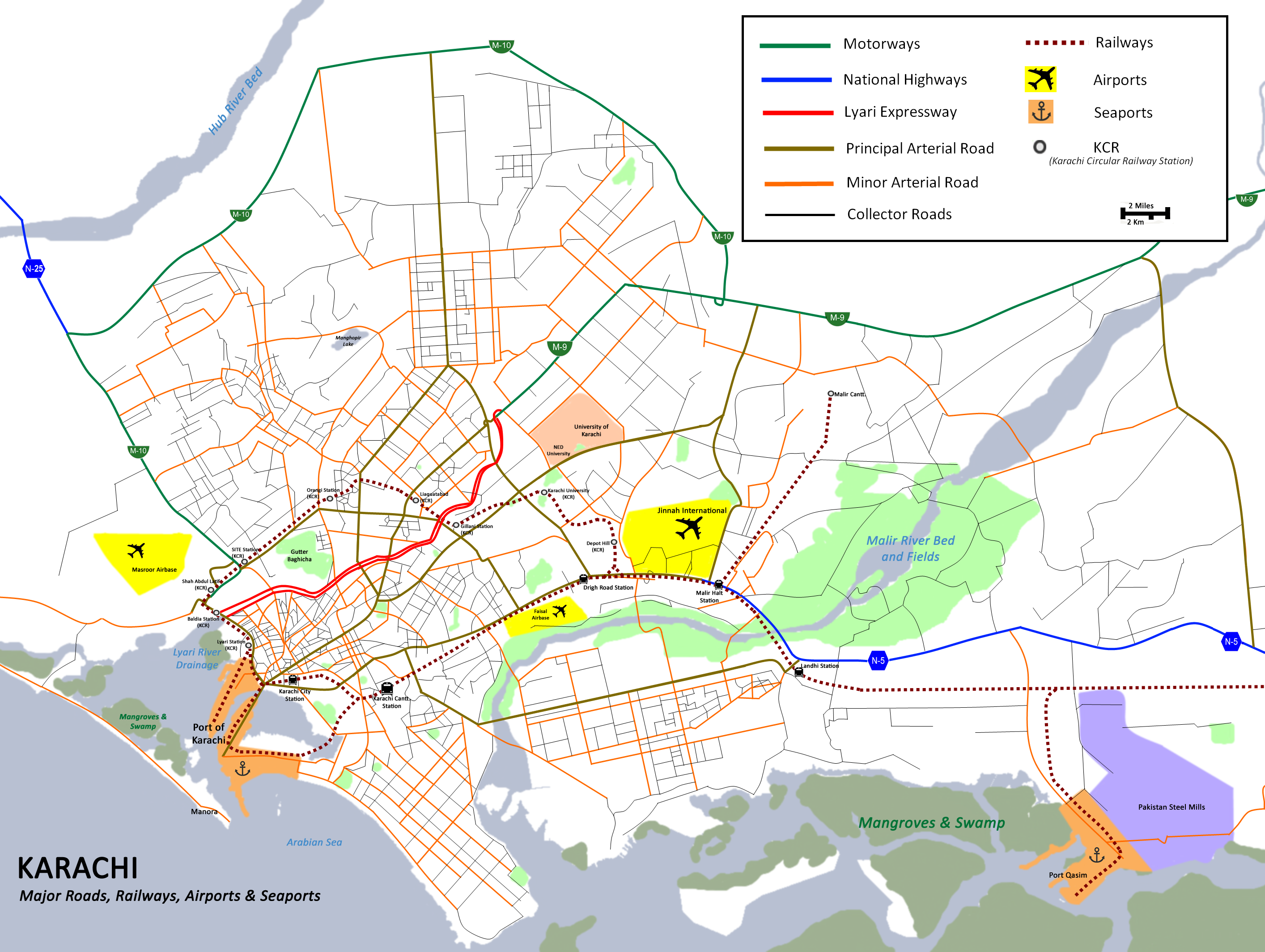
Location of Steel Town in Karachi

Steel Town is an 8,126-acre (3,288 ha) suburb that houses employees of Pakistan Steel Mills, where permanent serving officers and workers are offered subsidised rents.

It is located along the N-5 National Highway that stretches from Karachi to Thatta eastwards. Steel Town is in the Gadap Town, Bin Qasim sub-division (tehsil) of Malir District in Karachi, Pakistan, about 21 kilometres (13 mi) from Karachi Airport and 40 kilometres (25 mi) from Karachi Port.

The neighbouring areas include, Pipri, Shah Latif Town, Shah Town and Gulshan-e-Hadeed.

== Community ==
Steel Town has been a melting pot of ethnicities including but not limited to Sindhis, Muhajirs, Punjabis, Kashmiris, Pakhtuns, Balochis, Brahuis, Memons as well as Bohras

The suburb area, located outside the urban center, features a 100-bed hospital with OPD, secondary and high schools, officer's mess, guest hotel, cricket stadium, hockey and soccer stadiums, lakes, parks, protected forests, multiple markets, bi-weekly bazaars and a discounted mart.

== Town Planning ==
Steel Town was built by Pakistan Steel Mills in collaboration with the Soviet Russian steel industrialists in the 1970s. The town is organized in blocks named after their aerial representation. For example, the L Block is in the shape of L as seen from a satellite. Upon entering and heading west approaching the 90-degree bend along T park (Triangle Shape) bordered with coconut trees, comes the lighted up yet protected directors' houses and chairman house. They are surrounded by several 100 yards of trees and a trench-like drainage and spillway along the east of circular road, followed by the green belt and multi-story guest house and officer's mess to the west side. Behind which, protected and further to the west along the boundary are the age old City Cliff School (upscale) and Mashal School (economic) along with some T blocks (3 story / 18 unit apartments) designated for Russian employees.

Continuing along the circular road comes the Russian Market, a semi-circle shaped center market with all kinds of shops, from stationary and garments to dispensaries, groceries and fast food. The only place for kids to enjoy a dip when it rains (depression area), as the entire town was secured by a central drainage system that was built to last and water never stood. Moving along comes the Bank designated area, L and T blocks to the west all the way to border, including a Beaconhouse School utilizing a T block building. As the circular road turns eastwards, the street going straight leads to Madr-e-Millat Girls College (named after the sister of Muhammad Ali Jinnah) and Pakistan Steel Cadet College (Boys only). Attached to the rear of which is Grand Mosque connecting the college to P block apartments, Christian Colony (cleaner's community), and 3 million gallon water reservoir (3MGR) Water Supply Department.

Tracing back to circular road heading eastwards is surrounded on each side by designated mid to senior officers' bungalows. To the left, behind bungalows, is an entrance to hockey and soccer grounds, basketball courts, an abandoned swimming pool and the cricket stadium surrounded by a stone mound. Further behind the stadium is a small lake, traditionally a favorite spot for Russians to go fishing on weekends. Further behind used to be a famous mound and an open ground used by parents to teach driving to their kids. Even further north were bushes, wild animals like boars and hidden lakes ventured by few and later cleaned away for development.

== Attractions ==
The "Quaid-e-Azam Park" is located in Steel Town. During holidays, people all over Karachi city arrange picnics to visit this place and enjoy leisure time.

Steel Town Police Station, Utility Stores, the residency of the Chairman of Pakistan Steel Mills and a public Library are located near the Quaid-e-Azam Park.
