= Government Degree College Memon Goth =

College in Karachi, Pakistan

Government Degree Science, Arts & Commerce College Memon Goth
- Type: Intermediate & Degree College
- Established: 1983–84
- Affiliations: Board of Intermediate Education Karachi, University of Karachi
- Principal: Ghulam Mustafa Rahu
- Academic staff: Three
- Location: Karachi, Sindh, Pakistan

Government Degree Science, Arts & Commerce College Memon Goth is a Co-education degree college located in Memon Goth Karachi, Pakistan adjacent to the Office of Union Council Murad Memon Goth.

== History ==
Government Degree Science, Arts & Commerce College Memon Goth was the first educational institution to provide the education on Higher Secondary basis in Gadap Town. It was established in 1983-84 with 105 students at that time. It is located on a huge area along with the Office of the Chairman Union Council Memon Goth. The area of the college includes the agricultural lands of Malir & Memon Goth itself.

== Library ==
The college library has a collection of over 18,500 reference books, encyclopedias, dictionaries, manuals, atlases, and other materials. It is available for use by the local population as well as students.
