= Saudabad =

Residential neighbourhood in Karachi

Coordinates: 24°54′N 67°12′E

Saudabad (Urdu: سعود آباد)is a neighborhood in Karachi, Pakistan, that is within Malir District. It was named after King Saud of Saudi Arabia.

Areas which are included in this UC (Union Council) are: from Gulshan-e-Harooni, Indus Mehran Housing Society, Khokhrapaar, Laal Masjid, Liaquat Market Road - H Area, G Area, Jinnah Square, Urdu Nagar, Kausar Town, C-Area, D1, D2, D3 & D4 areas, S1, S2 & S3 areas till Saudabad Chowrangi, which is reconstructed and renovated by the orders of City Nazim Mustafa Kamal, The Great wholesale Tanki market where peoples from all the UCs of Malir Town come to shop Specially from neighbouring Model Colony, RCD ground etc.
