= Rehri Goth =

Residential neighbourhood in Karachi

Rehri Goth ریڑھی گوٹھ
- Neighbourhood
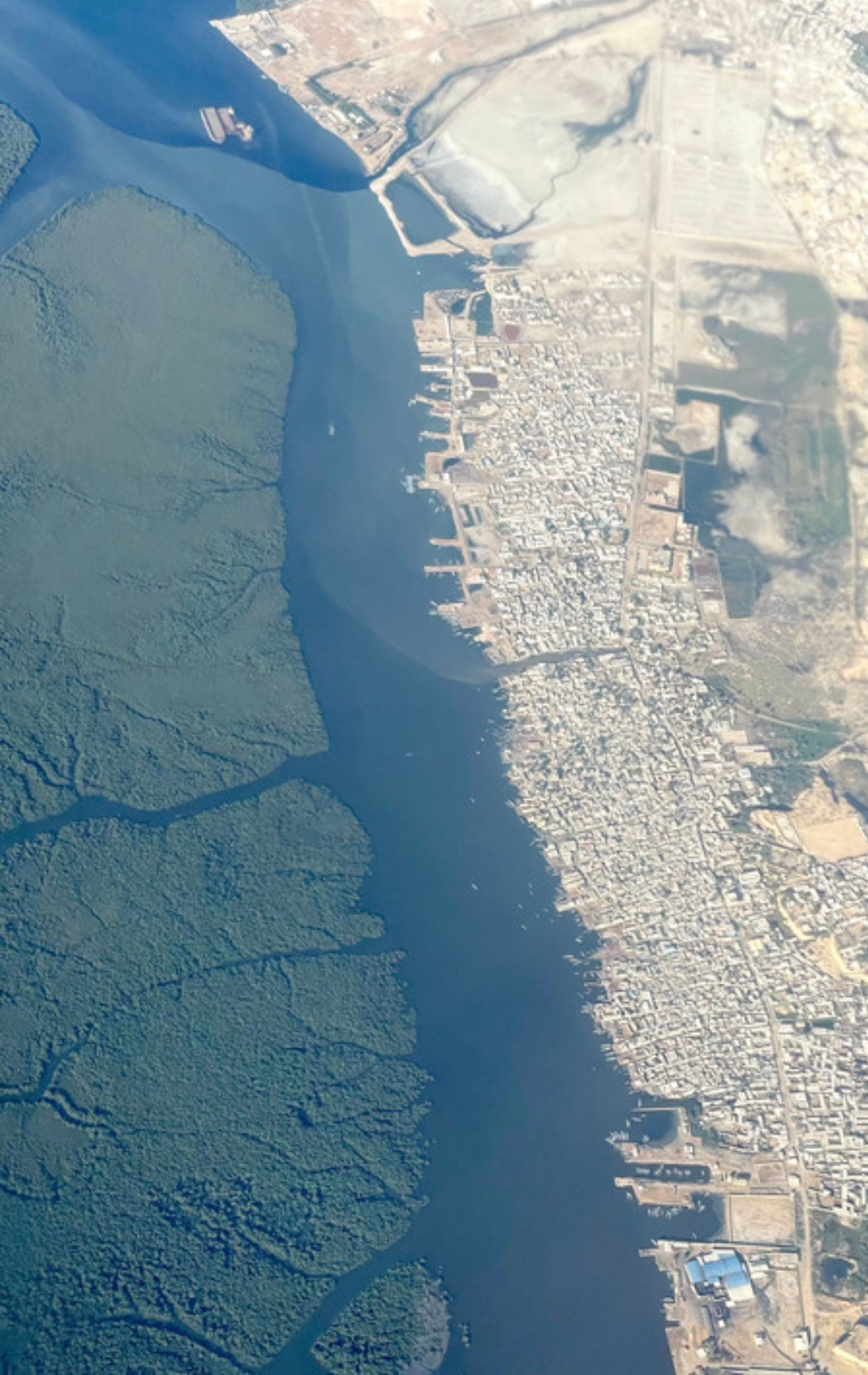
- View from the east over Reghri Goth along the coast opposite the mangrove swamps.
- Nickname: Rehri
- Location in Sindh
- Coordinates: 24°48′52″N 67°13′44″E
- Country: Pakistan
- Province: Sindh
- Division: Karachi
- Karachi Town: Ibrahim Hyderi Town
- Settled: 13th century
- Founder: Sindhi fishermen
- Union Council: Rehri Goth (U.C.10) Ibrahim Hyderi

Government

Population (2023)
  - Total: 45,000−70,000
- Demonym: Karachiite
- Time zone: UTC+05:00 (Pakistan Standard Time)
- Postal code: 75160
- Area code: 021

Rehri Goth is a neighbourhood located within Malir District in Karachi, Sindh, Pakistan.

Rehri Goth, located southeast of Karachi, is one of Pakistan's oldest fishing settlements, now integrated into metropolitan Karachi. Positioned along the coastal belt between the eastern outskirts of Korangi Creek and west of Port Muhammad Bin Qasim, Rehri Goth enjoys direct access to the mangrove islands of the Indus River Delta. The settlement boasts an approximate population of 70,000. Officially, the land upon which the settlement resides is owned by the Karachi Port Trust.

Rehri Goth is regarded as one of the impoverished neighbourhoods in Karachi.

== History, Demography and Social Aspects ==
Rehri Goth, dating back to the 13th century, is inhabited solely by fishermen who adhere to a traditional system of local governance and dispute resolution. Its residents, predominantly Sindhi speakers, comprise both long-standing inhabitants and recent migrants from villages surrounding the Indus delta, compelled to relocate due to droughts or sea intrusion caused by upstream dam construction and irrigation systems.

Unemployment is rampant due to declining fish catches attributed to coastal water pollution and commercial fishing. Residents blame local and foreign trawlers for devastating subsistence fishing. Pollution sources include raw sewage disposal, waste from a nearby buffalo colony, and untreated wastewater from the Korangi Industrial Estate.

Over the years, fishing in the area has transformed significantly. Initially, indigenous communities prioritised marine conservation due to their close ties to the sea. However, after 1968, with support from an FAO-backed program, bank loans facilitated a shift from subsistence to commercial fishing. This transition led to unsustainable practices, such as using small dragnets and disregarding off-season fishing periods. Additionally, the lack of clear sea boundaries between India and Pakistan has resulted in fishermen inadvertently crossing into Indian waters, leading to arrests and imprisonment by Indian coastguards, causing distress among affected households.

Despite the local government's provision of water supply infrastructure, it inadequately meets residents' needs, prompting reliance on informal water vendors. Poor infrastructure, insufficient educational and medical provisions, and lack of economic incentives have left the majority of the inhabitants in precarious conditions. As an ancient Sindhi settlement, Rehri Goth has historically been supported by Sindhi-speaking politicians and bureaucrats. Its leadership comprises individuals who serve as intermediaries between these officials and the local community, with many also involved in commercial fishing enterprises.

== Environmental challenges ==
The settlement was once encircled by mangrove forests, but their extent has drastically diminished due to livestock grazing, illegal logging, fuel consumption, and reduced freshwater flow caused by upstream dams, and canal and irrigation systems. Solid waste collection and disposal pose significant challenges in the area, with Rehri Goth and nearby villages directly dumping raw sewage and solid waste into the sea. Water analysis of Rehri Creek reveals significant contamination from untreated industrial and cattle colony waste directly discharged into the sea. This poses a serious environmental threat, leading to ecological imbalance and loss of biodiversity in the area.

The city administration's waste collection trolley operates infrequently, exacerbating the issue. Nevertheless, the solid waste serves as a resource for land reclamation purposes, particularly for building houses. However, the housing quality is subpar, with haphazard layouts and some houses situated below road level, leading to flooding during the monsoon season. Pollution adversely impacts public health.
