= 2009 Karachi floods =

Natural disaster in Pakistan

Coordinates: 24°51′36″N 67°00′36″E

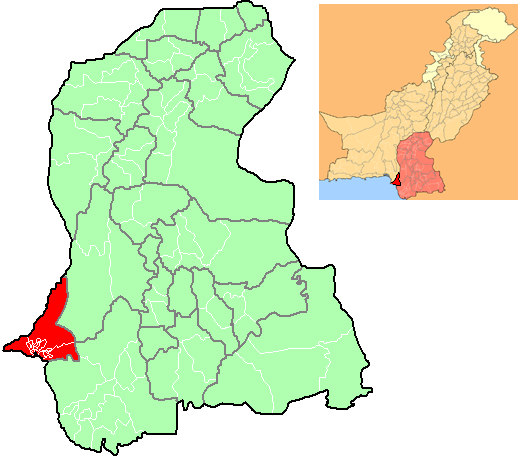
- Location of Karachi in Sindh, Pakistan

Meteorological history
- Duration: July – August 2009

Overall effects
- Fatalities: At least 26
- Areas affected: Karachi

The 2009 Karachi floods (Urdu: سيلاب کراچی) in Pakistan's financial centre, Karachi, have killed at least 26 people. The death toll is expected to rise, and more than 150 people have been injured in a series of related incidents. The floods are the result of the heaviest rains in the region in thirty years.

Hundreds of homes were also damaged. Those killed either drowned, were electrocuted or died under collapsing roofs. A bit of a building's sixth floor collapsed in Ramswami—debris dropping onto a nearby house, killing four members of a family and injuring 10. Several others were injured as a result of a roof collapse in the Orangi area and two people died in a similar incident. Eleven people were injured after a house wall fell through in Manghopir. Seven people were electrocuted in separate sections of Karachi. One resident reported the death of his neighbor's son to Reuters, saying he drowned in a drain and his body was pulled out. Knee-deep water stranded several thousand people in their homes for several hours. Commercial markets were waterlogged and several hundred vehicles were trapped on the city's roads.

Most of Karachi had no electricity on the night of 18 July 2009. Relief efforts are ongoing as water is removed from residential areas.

According to Qamar-uz-Zaman Chaudhry, the country's chief meteorologist, Pakistan's commercial hub received 14.7 cm (6 in) of rain between the evening of 17 July and the morning of 19 July. However, the rains began around two weeks later than usual and thus are expected to lead to a 30% reduction in rainfall for the 2009 season.

But then another monsoon system was expected to lash the city which was to generate very heavy rains and the citizens were still recovering from the last monsoon rains which broke the record of 1977 rain in Karachi, which was of 207 millimetres (8.1 in). However it only dumped 18 millimetres (0.71 in) rain and the system dissipated quickly on 26 July. Then on August 30 and 31 sudden heavy rains started to lash the city which dumped 147.7 millimetres (5.81 in) rain, Thus again Karachiites were forced to spend the night sleepless due to power breakdown and thousands were forced to end their fasting in traffic jams, as it was the holy month of Ramadan.

== See also ==
- Climate of Karachi
- Climate of Pakistan
- 2009 India floods
- 2017 Karachi floods
