= Songal =

Pakistani neighbourhood

Coordinates: 24°58′N 67°07′E

Songal (Urdu: سونگل) is a neighbourhood in the Malir district of Karachi, Pakistan. The neighbourhood was a part of Gadap Town until 2011.

There are several ethnic groups in Songal including Muhajirs, Sindhis, Punjabis, Kashmiris, Seraikis, Pakhtuns, Balochis, Memons, Bohras, Ismailis and Christians.
