= Gharibabad =

Neighborhood of Karachi, Pakistan

Gharibabad (Urdu: غریب آباد) is a neighborhood in Karachi, Pakistan, that is within Malir District. Gharibabad was located along the tracks of the old Karachi Circular Railway.
