= Ghazi Brohi Goth =

Neighborhood of Karachi, Pakistan

Dawood Goth (Urdu: داود گو ٹ) is a neighborhood in Karachi, Pakistan, that is within Malir District.

One of the major villages of Malir is Asoo Village. It is a 300-year-old village in which a Hindu merchant named Asoo Mal once owned nearly 100 acres of land.
