= Khokhra Par, Karachi =

Neighbourhood in Karachi, Pakistan

Khokhrapar (Urdu: کھوکھراپار) is a neighborhood in Karachi, Pakistan, that is within Malir District. The origin of the name "Khokhra par" goes back to the days when Mohajirs (immigrants) from partition time came to this place, most of them crossed the border of India to newly founded country of Pakistan from Khokhra Par, Sindh and found this area significantly resembling with original Khokhra Par because of its dry and desert-like surroundings were quite similar in nature to what they earlier came across during their exodus, therefore they ended up naming it the same, latter it was attempted to officially renamed as "Azam Colony" in honor of then Governor of West Pakistan Lieutenant General Muhammad Azam Khan (1908–1994) by the Government but the earlier name "Khokhra Par" remained more prominent and popular.

Pakistani Test cricketer Khurram Manzoor and Pashto/Urdu pop singer Raheem Shah hail from Khokhra Par.

Popular localities in Khokhra Par are:

- Adam Hangora Goth
- Saudia Colony
- Indus Mehran Society
- Kausar Town
- Pak Kausar Town
- Gilanabad Society
- Nazir Town
- Sabir Colony
- A Area
- B Area
- C Area
- D and D1 Area
- S series (1-4) Area
- G Area
- H Area
- FN Area
- Bense Colony
- Gulshan e Quddus
- Mominabad Phase-I & II

== Demographics and Ethnic Outset ==
Khokhrapar has a mixed population of Mohajirs, Pashtuns, Sindhis, Balochis, Punjabis and Katchi and katchi parhyar cast with the majority being Katchi, in a politically split outset of Karachi which is based on ethnicity, Khokhr Par has somewhat a reputation of a place where most ethnic groups coexist in a rather peaceful way.
