= Gulshan-e-Hadeed =

Neighbourhood in Karachi, Pakistan

Gulshan-e-Hadeed گلشن حدید
- Neighborhood
- Interactive map of Gulshan-e-Hadeed
- Coordinates: 24°52′11″N 67°21′37″E
- Country: Pakistan
- Province: Sindh
- City: Karachi
- District: Malir District
- Subdivision/Tehsil: Bin Qasim
- Union Council: Gulshan-e-Hadeed (U.C.04) Gadap Town

Government
  - UC Chairman: Rao Safdar Hayat (PPP)
  - Vice Chairman: Mir Abbas Talpur

Population (2023 Census of Pakistan)
  - Total: 322,915 (population of Bin Qasim including Gulshan-e-Hadeed)
- Demonym: Sindhi
- Time zone: UTC+05:00 (PST)
- Post code: 75010
- Non-Delivery Post code: 07423

Gulshan-e-Hadeed (Sindhi: گلشن حديد) (meaning Garden of Iron) is a residential neighborhood in the Bin Qasim sub-division (tehsil) of Malir District in Karachi, Pakistan.

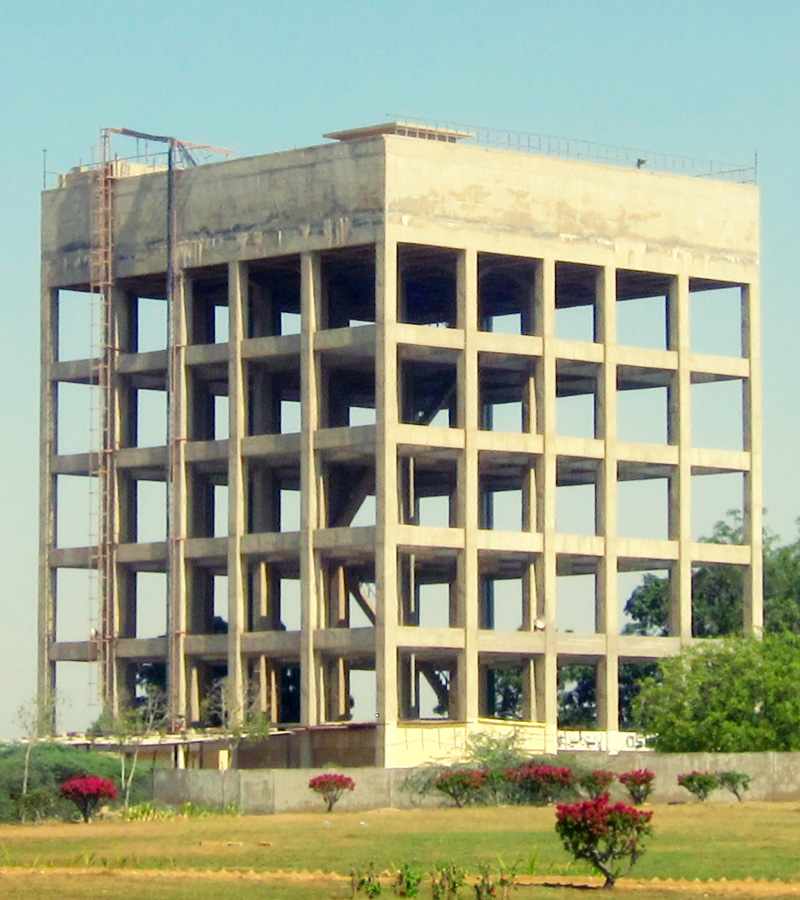
Water tank at Gulsan-e-Hadeed.

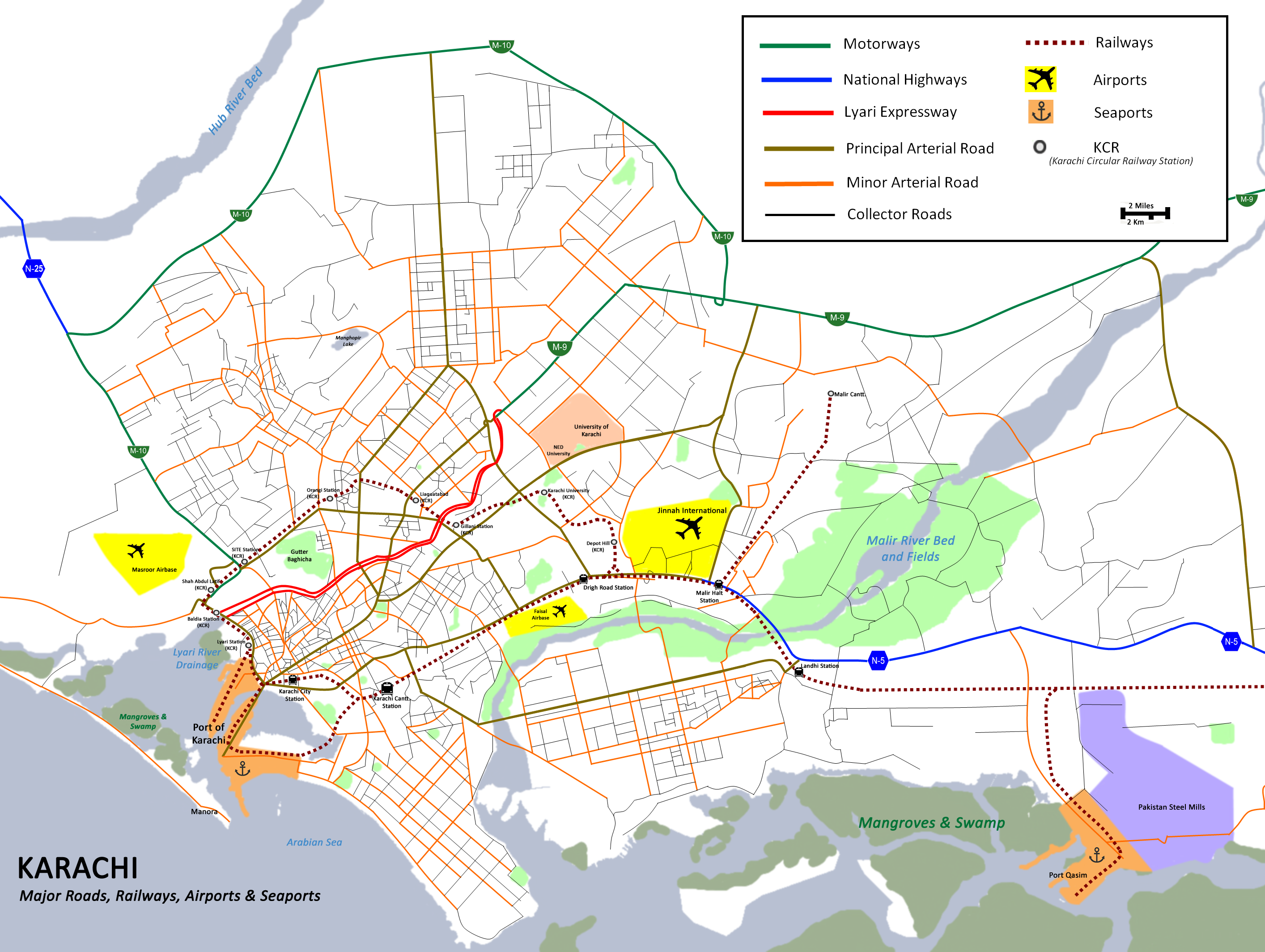
Location of Gulshan-e-Hadeed in Karachi

Gulshan-e-Hadeed was built near Pakistan Steel Mills for housing its employees in the late 1980s, and thus the name. The Gulshan-e-Hadeed neighborhood was designed by Russian architects. The town was originally divided into three but now five Blocks; A, B, BI, BII and C in all Phase 1,2,3 including Phase1&2 Extension. Each block contains houses of a specific size as follows:-

- A-type house: 120 squares yards
- B-type house: 240 square yards
- BI-type house: 200 square yards
- BII-type house: 300 square yards
- C-type house: 500 square yards

The core of the area is made up of smaller "A-type" houses. Of late, most of houses facing the main artery of the area have been commercialized by owners.

Gulshan-e-Hadeed provides almost all necessary facilities for healthcare, education, business etc. Its streets and roads both are paved and the area is densely populated. Two and three-story houses seem to be increasing in number.

The educational facilities in Gulshan-e-Hadeed are improving in quality and increasing in number with the passage of time. This Population to School ratio of this area is more than any other city or town in the entire country.

== Demography ==
The ethnic groups in Gulshan-e-Hadeed include Sindhis as majority along with Muhajirs, Punjabis, Kashmiris, Seraikis, Pakhtuns, Balochs, Brahuis, Memons etc. Most of the residents of Gulshan-e-Hadeed are employees of Pakistan Steel Mills and adjoining industries in Bin Qasim. Almost 60 percent population is Sindhi. Over 98 percent of the population is Muslim with small Christian and Hindu minority. Along with several mosques, Gulshan-e-Hadeed also has a church and a temple for its Christian and Hindu residents. The area is often considered as the most peaceful in the city with respect to law and order situation mainly because of being remote from the other towns of the city.

== Geography ==
Gulshan-e-Hadeed is a union council-4 of Gadap Town after Local Election Act -2022 (amended), comes under the sub-division (tehsil) of Bin Qasim of district Malir. It is 25-minutes drive (around 23 km) from Karachi's Jinnah International Airport, adjacent to National Highway while going towards Eastern side or Thatta. It's very close to the Link Road connecting National Highway with M9 Motorway. There are some illegal goth settlements on encroached land near Gulshan-e-Hadeed. There are roads leading to Gadap, Thatta and Hyderabad.

== Development phases ==
Gulshan-e-Hadeed is divided into four parts:

- Phase I is a commercial and residential area. It includes about 2500 houses and a centrally located main commercial market that comprises many shops. In the center of Phase I lies Jamia Masjid Dayare Habib Trust. It is among the largest mosques in hadeed, and it regularly accommodates more than 3000 people at Friday prayers.
- Phase II is a residential and commercial area, comprising more than 4000 houses. In the start of Phase II there is a mosque called the Jamia Masjid Bab-u-Rehmat Trust. It is amongst the largest masajid in Bin Qasim Town, and it regularly gathers more than 3000 people at Friday prayers. Phase II has local small markets called "L markets" in each neighbourhood. There are fifteen such markets in Phase II and two main commercial marts.
- Phase I&II Extension is being populated at a rapid pace.
- Phase III which has been started to develop.
