= Gujro =

Neighbourhood of Karachi, Pakistan

Gujro (Urdu: گجرو) is a neighbourhood in the Malir district of Karachi, Pakistan. Until 2011, the neighbourhood was a part of Gadap Town.

The several ethnic groups residing here include Muhajirs, Sindhis, Kashmiris, Seraikis, Pakhtuns, Balochis, Memons, Bohras and Ismailis.
