= Malir Cantonment railway station =

Railway station in Pakistan

Malir Cantonment Station ملیر کینٹ اسٹیشن

General information
- Coordinates: 24.9520°N 67.2261°E
- Owner: Ministry of Railways
- Line: Karachi Circular Railway

Other information
- Station code: MXBC

Services
Preceding station	Karachi Circular Railway	Following station
Malir Colony towards Malir	Malir line	Terminus
Location

Malir Cantonment Railway Station (Urdu: ملیر کینٹ ریلوے اسٹیشن) is located at Malir Cantonment, Karachi, Pakistan.

== See also ==
- List of railway stations in Pakistan
- Pakistan Railways
