= Gulshan-e-Maymar =

Neighbourhood in Karachi, Sindh, Pakistan

Gulshan-e-Maymar (گلشنِ معمار) is one of the neighbourhoods of Gadap Town in Karachi, Sindh, Pakistan.

Maymar originated in the late 1970s, and the venture was formally launched in 1980. The core philosophy driving the establishment of this township was to provide a model, master-planned community for Karachi's populace in a suburban setting. The township was planned from scratch, with a focus on building into the master plan amenities and services that were not available elsewhere in the city. Generous allocation was made for parks, mosques, clubs, health and education facilities, etc. to allow residents to feel self-contained within the bounds of the township. In essence, Gulshan-e-Maymar represented a microcosm of Maymar's management's utopian world.

Having gone through 13 phases of extensions and development, Gulshan-e-Maymar currently stands at 1023 acres. Its population today is at 45% of its optimal capacity of 100,000, which is the number around which all the amenities and services have been planned. The township has witnessed significant growth in recent years due to its quaint setting, plethora of amenities, relatively low air and noise pollution, and access to one of the major freeways of the country. At its current growth rate, the township will get close to its capacity figure by 2012. The significant growth of this township has resulted in exponential appreciation of real estate prices within it – this trend is expected to continue in the foreseeable future as evidenced by the growth projections and the lack of alternative townships with similar facilities and amenities.

Starting from Jamali Bridge, the surrounding area has become increasingly unsafe, particularly during nighttime. The main link road adjacent to the M-9 motorway is in poor condition, and incidents of street snatching have reportedly become common after dark.

In addition to the deteriorating road conditions and security concerns, there is also an issue with how incidents are reported. Any incident that occurs after Sohrab Goth is often incorrectly reported in the news as having taken place in Gulshan-e-Maymar. This misreporting creates a misleading perception and negatively affects the reputation of the private residential societies in the area, despite the incidents actually occurring outside their jurisdiction.

It is important that the concerned authorities address both the security situation and the road infrastructure, while the media ensures accurate reporting of incident locations to avoid unfairly damaging the image of residential communities.

Gulshan-e-Maymar township is situated just off the Super Highway (main highway between Karachi and Hyderabad, M-9) in MDA Scheme 45 (and partly in MDA scheme 33) in Karachi. It is about ten kilometers north-east of Sohrab Goth / F.B. Area and approximately 15 kilometers from the Expo Center. Its postal code is 07526.

In July 2025, a fatal clash between Pakistani police and paramilitary Rangers in Karachi's SITE-A Area highlighted growing tensions and disciplinary issues within the country's security apparatus. A police officer, Waseem Akhtar—posted at Gulshan-e-Maymar Police Station—was killed, and a Rangers official, Nauman, was critically injured after a verbal dispute escalated into a shootout. According to Keamari SSP Captain (retd) Faizan Ali, both personnel appeared to be in a poor mental state. Authorities recovered two 9mm pistols from the scene, and formal legal proceedings have been initiated. The incident underscored underlying animosities and lapses in cohesion between Pakistan's law enforcement agencies.

Ayub Shah Bukhari was a Sufi master and his shrine is located in Gulshan-e-Maymar.
