= Jafar-e-Tayyar =

Jafar e Tayyar جعفر طیار سوسائٹی
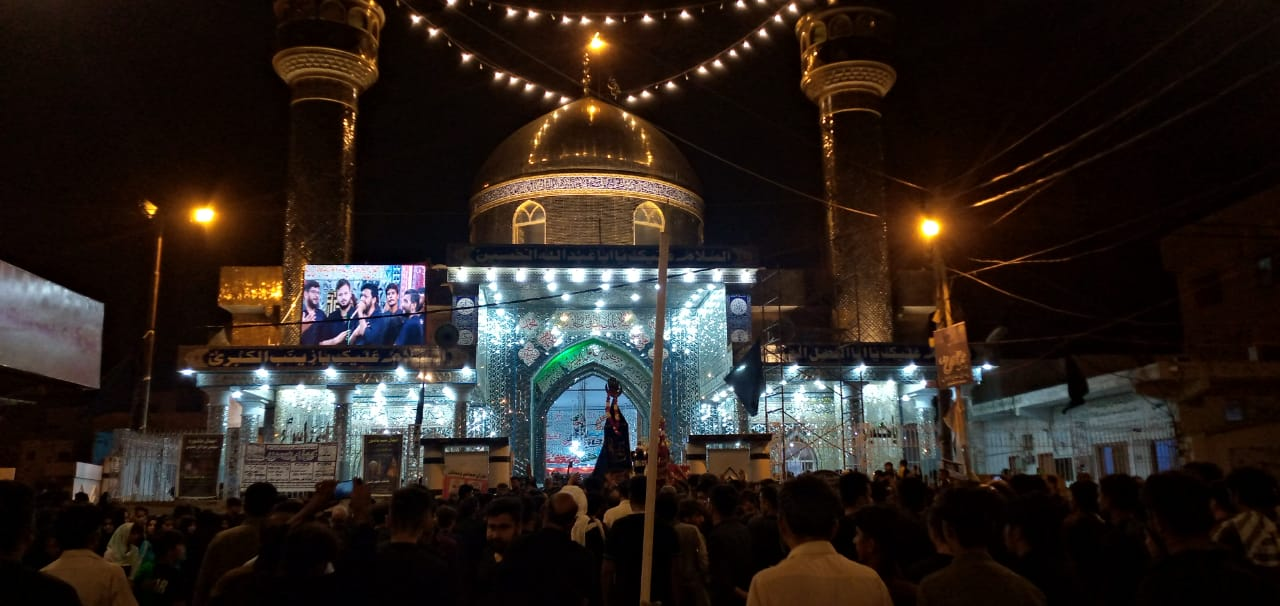
- Markazi ImamBargah Jafar E Tayyar Malir
- Country: Pakistan
- Province: Sindh
- Division: Karachi
- Established: 1969
- Founder: Haider Ali Rashid Mulji

Government
  - Type: Municipal corporation
  - Body: DMC Malir
  - Deputy Commissioner: Muhammad Saeed Laghari
- Postal code: 75050
- Website: Jafar e Tayyar Website

Jafar-E-Tayyar or Jaffar-E-Tayyar Cooperative Housing Society (Urdu: جعفر طیار) (J.T.C.H.S.) is one of the neighbourhoods of Malir District in Karachi, Sindh, Pakistan. The resident population is 99% Shia Muslims in Jafar-e-Tayyar.

== History of Jafar Tayyar ==
As Karachi's population grew, mourning also spread to different parts of the city. There is also a Jaffar Tayyar Society in these settlements. Jaffar Tayyar Society is located in Malir District and has a population of over 60,000. These include Hasnain Society, Ammar Yasir, Ghazi Town, and Bagh Asad. This entire population consists of believers and is now a regular union council of Malir District.

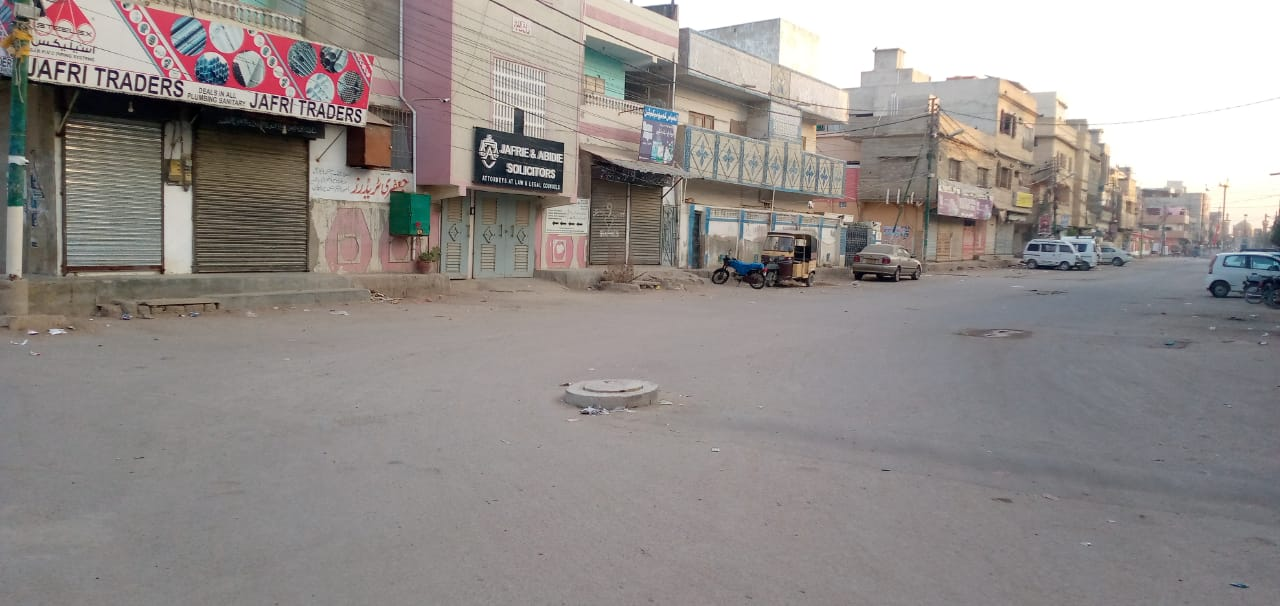
Jafar E Tayyar Society in October 2022

Malir was an agricultural area, therefore it was totally dependent on rainfall. As the rains receded, water problems continued to grow and as a result, farmers left the land and retreated. So the farmers started selling this vacant land. Jafar e Tayyar Society also consisted of farms. When the farms came to an end, it was bought by a capitalist Haider Ali Mulji in 1969 and he started plotting for the believers here. Initially, a 200-yard plot was sold for Rs 2,000 and a 96-yard plot for Rs 1,000. Thus the population began to grow slowly. The first house here belonged to the aunt of the forest, whose name was given to the forest aunt because she lived in this forest. It was the same three-story house in front of the Markazi Imambargah that collapsed in 2019. The population expansion of Jafar Tayyar Society started from F-South adjoining surveys like 640, 627, 417 and 552 etc., and has grown to such an extent that today Jafar Tayyar Society is a Union Council of Malir District.
