= Pakistan Machine Tool Factory =

Pakistan professional tool manufacturer

- Type: State-owned enterprise
- Industry: Manufacturing
- Founded: 1968 in Karachi, Sindh, Pakistan
- Headquarters: Karachi, Pakistan
- Area served: Pakistan-only
- Key people: Zeeshan Ahmed (Managing-Director)
- Products: Machine tool
- Owner: Government of Pakistan
- Number of employees: 850
- Website: pmtfl.com

The Pakistan Machine Tool Factory (PMTF) is a Pakistani manufacturer of power and machine tools based in Karachi, Sindh, Pakistan. It was established in Karachi in 1968, the facility was built for the local manufacture of machine tools under technical cooperation and technology transfer agreements with Oerlikon-Bührle of Switzerland.

== History and challenges ==
Established in Karachi in 1968, PMTF has faced many challenges over the years. Despite completing contracts worth Rs 7.5 billion in 2019, over 700 PMTF employees have gone without salaries for four months. The factory is on the brink of collapse due to financial constraints. Short-sighted government policies and a long and failed privatization process over decades have adversely affected the company's performance and turned it into an ailing unit.

=== Revival plan ===
In February 2019, the government approved a recovery plan for the PMTF and decided to rehabilitate and restructure the collapsing PMTF, excluding it from the privatization process for state-owned enterprises (SOEs). The government approved handing over the PMTF to the Strategic Plans Division to replace the ailing government tools manufacturing unit.

=== Collaboration with SSGC-AE ===
PMTF and Sui Southern Gas Company Alternate Energy Limited (SSGC-AE) have signed a Memorandum of Understanding (MoU) to unlock "Green Molecules" renewable natural gas potential. As a result, PMTF will supply biogas/biomethane, a renewable natural gas, to SSGC-AE.
