= Surjani Town =

Neighbourhood of Karachi, Pakistan

Coordinates: 25°02′N 67°04′E

Surjani Town (Urdu: سرجانی ٹاؤن) is one of the neighborhoods of Gadap Town in Karachi, Sindh, Pakistan.

== Demography ==
There are several ethnic groups in Surjani Town including Sindhis, Punjabis, Muhajirs, Kashmiris, Saraikis, Pakhtuns, Balochis, Memons, Bohras, Ismailis, Baltis, etc. Over 99% of Gadap Town's estimated 2.5 million population is Muslim.
