= Qaidabad =

Karachi neighbourhood

Coordinates: 32°20′N 71°55′E

Qaidabad قائدآباد
- Neighbourhood
- Interactive map of Qaidabad
- Country: Pakistan
- Province: Sindh
- District: Malir
- City: Karachi
- Time zone: UTC+5 (PST)
- Postal code: 75120

Qaidabad or Quaidabad (Urdu: قائد آباد) is a neighbourhood in the Malir District of Karachi, Pakistan. It was previously a part of Bin Qasim, which was disbanded in 2011.
