= Murad Memon Goth =

Neighbourhood in Karachi, Pakistan

Murad Memon Goth, Memon Goth or Murad Memon (Urdu: مراد میمن گوٹھ) is an administrative subdivision (Tehsil) of Malir District of Karachi, Pakistan, that was a part of Gadap Town until 2011. The estimated population of Memon Goth in 2019 was 75,000.

Memon Goth has the highest number of educational institutions around Gadap Town. The neighborhoods are: Abdul Karim Muhalla, Umeed Ali Muhalla, Maheshwari Muhallah, Brohi Muhallah, Haji Ahmed Muhallah, Jamot Muhallah, Bachal Bagh, Hashim Khaskheli Goth UC Murad Memon, Jam Goth UC Murad Memon, Somar Kandani UC Murad Memon, Mola Essa UC Murad Memon, Nimat Village Brohi Muhallah. The neighbourhood is located in agricultural lands of Gadap Town.

== See also ==
- Government Degree College Memon Goth
