= Yousuf Goth =

Neighbourhood in Karachi, Pakistan

Coordinates: 24°52′N 67°16′E

Yousuf Goth (Urdu: یوسف گوٹھ) is one of the neighbourhoods of Gadap Town in Karachi, Sindh, Pakistan.

Several ethnic groups from all over Pakistan reside in Yousuf Goth. Over 99% of Gadap Town's nearly one million population is Muslim.
