= Darsano Chana =

Neighbourhood in Karachi

Darsano Chhana or Darsano Chhanno (Urdu: درسانو چهنو, Sindhi: درساڻو ڇنو) is a neighbourhood of Gadap town in the Malir district of Karachi, Pakistan.

Diverse ethnic and religious groups live in Darsano Chana including Muhajirs, Sindhis, Punjabis, Kashmiris, Seraikis, Pakhtuns, Balochis, Memons, Bohras, Christians and Ismailis. But the majority of the residents are Sindhi (Jokhio and other communities) and Baloch (Jadgal).

Name	Darsano Chana
Type	(suburb / Locality)
City	Karachi
District	Malir District
Province	Sindh
Country	Pakistan
Nearby areas	Bahria town, DHA city, National Highway link road
Ethnic groups	Sindhi, Baloch, Urdu-speaking
Languages	Sindhi, Urdu
Administrative status	Part of Malir District, Karachi Division
