= 2017 South Asian floods =

Natural disaster in South Asia

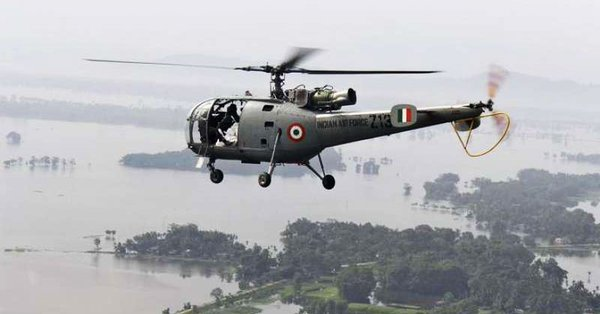
- A helicopter from Indian Air Force rescue the people on flood area in Gujarat
- Date: July – September 2017
- Location: Afghanistan, Bangladesh, India, Nepal, Pakistan
- Cause: Monsoon
- Deaths: 1,419

Widespread monsoon flooding occurred in the South Asian countries of Afghanistan, Bangladesh, India, Nepal and Pakistan from July through September 2017. More than 45 million people were affected by the floods, including 16 million children.

About 2,000 people, on average, had died due to flooding in South Asia each year during the previous two decades, according to The New York Times' reading of the Centre for Research on the Epidemiology of Disasters (EM-DAT) disaster database.

== Background and context ==
Monsoons hit South Asia every year between June and September, but the 2017 monsoon season was far worse than average, bringing flooding and associated landslides of unusual severity. Experts called the floods the worst in South Asia in decades and a threat to long-term food supplies due to ruined farmland. The estimated number of people affected increased from 24 million to 41 million during the last week of August. Confirmed human fatalities numbered 1,288 by 2 September, with a total of more than 45 million people affected.

The International Centre for Climate Change and Development (ICCCD) and others asserted that the floods had been exacerbated by climate change.

== Countries affected ==
=== Afghanistan ===
As of July 2017, at least 16 people were killed by floods in Badakhshan Province.

=== Bangladesh ===
As of 1 September, flooding that the International Federation of Red Cross and Red Crescent Societies called the worst in four decades covered approximately one-third of Bangladesh, primarily in the northern, north-eastern, and central parts of the country. At the height of the storms on 11 August, a week of regular monsoon rain fell in the span of a few hours. More rain and flooding was expected, including in Dhaka, the country's capital. Over six million have been affected, according to UNICEF, with estimates ranging as high as 8.5 million. Property losses included nearly 700,000 damaged or destroyed homes, 4,680,000 hectares (11,600,000 acres) of farmland inundated, and thousands of miles of damaged roads. The sheer amount of destroyed farmland, coming during the regular time of rice cultivation, has sparked fears of a food crisis in the country.

Around 140 deaths from the floods were reported. Over fifty thousand people have been displaced, adding to nearly thirty thousand refugees fleeing the 2016–17 Northern Rakhine State clashes.

=== India ===
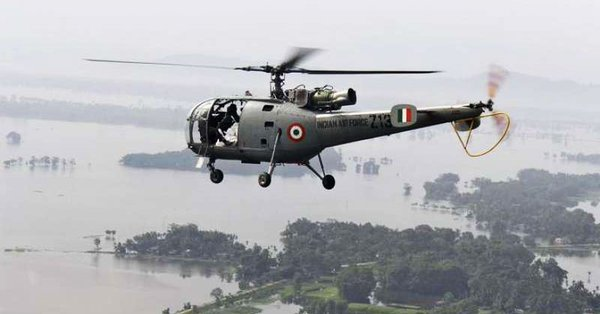
Helicopter deployed by Indian Air Force for rescue in flooded regions of Gujarat

Flooding in India has been primarily confined to the northern portion of the country, including Assam, West Bengal, Bihar, Rajasthan and Uttar Pradesh. By mid-August, flooding had affected over 31 million people, and damaged or destroyed over 800,000 houses. Over 85% of Kaziranga National Park was flooded. Government officials were criticized for not placing more preventative measures before these floods hit. In Bihar, for example, Reuters reported that there was anger at the number of embankments and roads which were designed with few to no provisions for water drainage. In Gujarat state, the floods and rains were reported to have caused 224 deaths in June and July months.

Mumbai faces severe problems each year during the monsoon season because of its loose building restrictions and large homeless population, but this year's season saw the city receive more rainfall and worse flooding than the Maharashtra floods of 2005. One hospital was flooded, and the city's public transportation was forced to shut down. The weather also caused a century-old multi-story building to collapse, killing at least 33. On 29 August 2017, Mumbai was again witness to floods due to a confluence of torrential rains and high tide, resulting in 298 mm of rainfall in a period of 9 hours. 5 people are reported to have lost their lives in Mumbai due to the deluge which saw the highest rainfall in a single day in August since 1997.

For the third consecutive year, monsoon season has been marked by flooding in the northwest and northeast regions, while drought in India worsens along the southern peninsula. According to an Indo-Asian News Service release issued in September, these "rainfall extremes have increased threefold over the last few years and now extend over all of central India – from Gujarat to Odisha." In total, there were 1,076 deaths caused by flooding in India. This includes 514 deaths in Bihar, 224 in Gujarat, 152 in West Bengal, 76 in Assam, 72 in Uttar Pradesh, and 38 in Maharashtra.

=== Nepal ===
As of 24 August 2017, 143 people have been killed in Nepal; 1.7 million have been affected by them, and around 461,000 have been forced out of their residences. Over 34,000 homes were flooded, destroying 1,000. Parts of the Mahendra Highway, the most important east–west connection in the country, were washed away, and agricultural experts predicted that the country's rice production would be adversely affected. The runway of Biratnagar Airport was flooded and the airport was forced to close on 15 August.

Experts stated that the flooding was the worst seen by Nepal in several years; about one-third of the country was flooded, much of it in the poorest areas of the country.

=== Pakistan ===
Monsoon rains caused urban flooding in Karachi and Rawalpindi, the largest cities in Pakistan. At least 23 people, including seven children, died after Karachi received up to 130 millimetres (5.1 in) of rainfall on 31 August. Most of the victims died from being electrocuted, with others being killed by partial building collapses or drowning. Two more died in Kashmore and Jamshoro districts of Sindh.

The flooding followed a little more than a week after 41 millimetres (1.6 in) of rain fell on Karachi on 21–22 August. There, 19 people died in rain-related incidents—including electrocution, falling billboards, and roof collapse, according to the Edhi and Chhipa rescue services.

According to the Pakistan Meteorological Department, the Karachi flood was caused by the monsoon rain which began on the evening of Wednesday, August 28. As the incident took place, the Army and Navy, along with other welfare organizations, started rescuing people.
