= Gadap =

Neighbourhood of Karachi, Pakistan

Coordinates: 25°08′N 67°14′E

Gadap (Urdu: گڈاپ,Sindhi: گڏاپ) is a neighbourhood in the Malir District of Karachi, Pakistan. It is a UC-1 of Gadap Town.
