= Malir River =

River in Pakistan

Coordinates: 24°48′N 67°05′E

Malir River (Urdu: دریائے ملیر) is a seasonal river that flows in Karachi, Sindh, Pakistan. It passes through the city of Karachi from the northeast, through the center, and drains into the Arabian Sea. It is one of the two rivers passing through Karachi, the other being the Lyari River. It has two main tributaries, the Thadho and the Sukhan.

In the rainy season, the Malir River experiences heavy water flow, with millions of gallons emptying into the Arabian Sea. The Malir Dam is a barrage regulating the flow and flooding of the river, preserving a reservoir during seasonal droughts.

The 39 kilometre (24.2 mi) Malir Expressway is under construction along the banks of the Malir River, connecting newer areas of development (Bahria Town) on the outskirts of the city to posh areas (DHA) in Karachi. It is controversial because it would cause the displacement of poor people, destroy farms and forests, make many species of fish and birds endangered, and exacerbate the urban heat island effect and global warming.

== Environmental Biochemistry and pollution ==
The Malir River serves as a major drainage conduit for Karachi, but it is heavily impacted by untreated municipal and industrial effluent. From an environmental biochemical engineering perspective, this discharge results in severely elevated Biochemical Oxygen Demand (BOD) and Chemical Oxygen Demand (COD) levels, depleting dissolved oxygen and creating hypoxic conditions that devastate local aquatic ecosystems. A critical concern is the influx of heavy metals, particularly lead and hexavalent chromium (Cr(VI)) from nearby industrial zones, which are highly toxic, mutagenic, and resistant to natural biodegradation. Mitigating this pollution requires the implementation of decentralized Common Effluent Treatment Plants (CETPs) utilizing advanced biochemical processes. Strategies such as anaerobic digestion for organic load reduction, followed by constructed wetlands for heavy metal phytoremediation, offer sustainable, nature-based solutions to restore the river's ecological balance before it discharges into the Arabian Sea.

== View ==
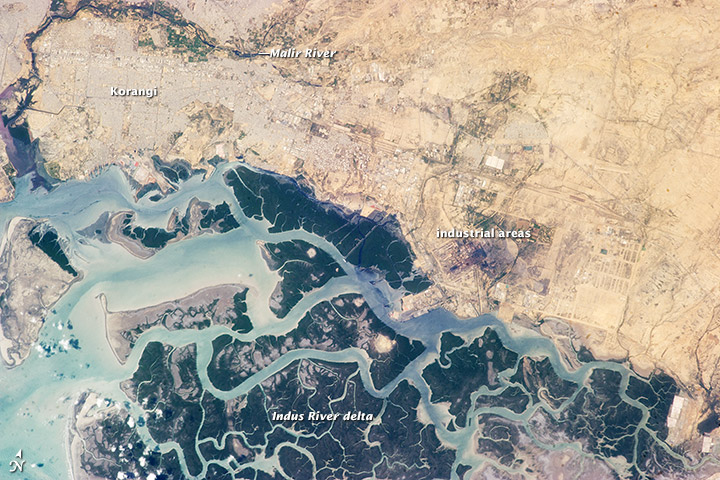
Korangi, Malir River and the surrounding region

== See also ==
- Lyari River
- Gujjar Nala
- Malir Town
- Malir District
- Karachi
