= Malir District =

District within the city of Karachi, Pakistan

Coordinates: 25.0960°N 67.1871°E

Malir District ضلع ملیر
- District of Sindh
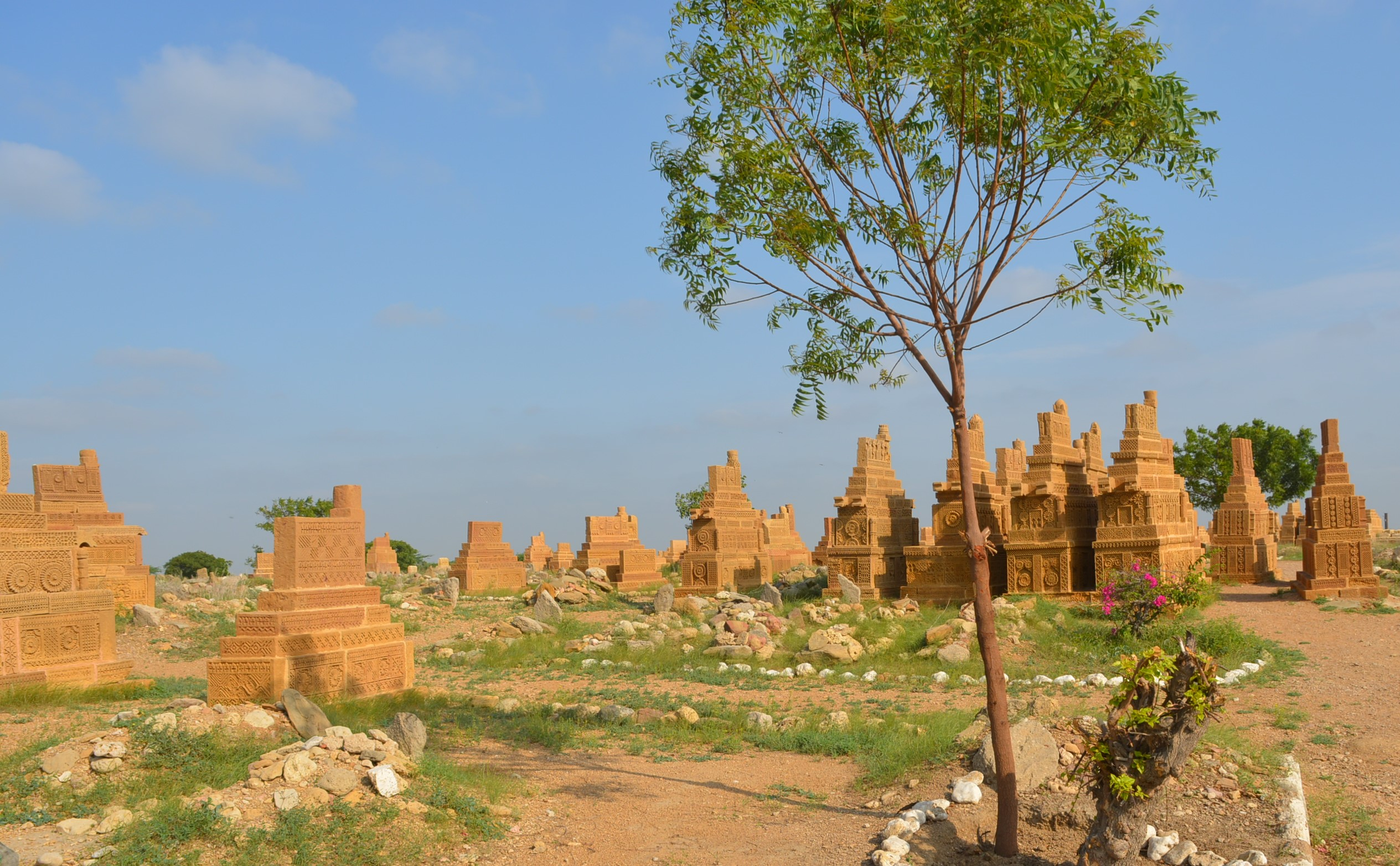
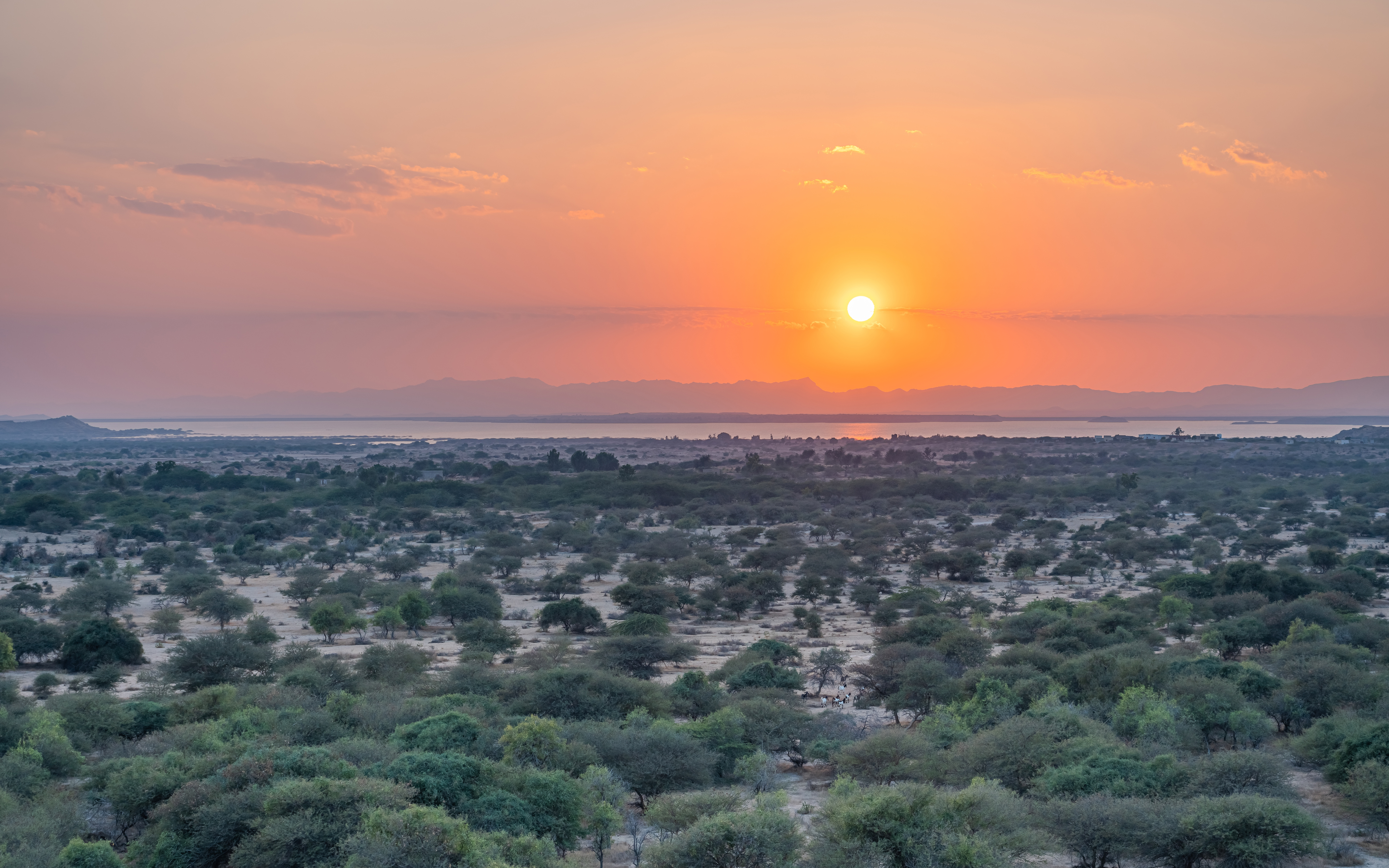
- Top: Chaukhandi tombs Bottom: Kirthar National Park

- Seal

- Map of Malir District
- Country: Pakistan
- Province: Sindh
- Division: Karachi
- Headquarters: DC Malir
- Preceded: District Karachi East (1972-1996)
- Established: 1996; 30 years ago
- Abolished: 2001; 25 years ago
- Restored: 11 July 2011; 15 years ago
- Administration: DMC Malir
- Administrative Subdivisions/Tehsils: 06

Government
  - Type: District Administration
  - Body: Government of Karachi
  - Deputy Commissioner: Capt (Rtd) Muhammad Saeed Laghari, PAS
  - National Assembly Seats (2024): Total 3: PPP (3); MQM-P (0); PTI (0); PMLN (0); NA-229 Karachi Malir-I; NA-230 Karachi Malir-II; NA-231 Karachi Malir-III
  - Provincial Assembly Seats (2024): Total 6: PPP (6); MQM-P (0); PTI (0); PMLN (0); PS-84 Karachi Malir-I; PS-85 Karachi Malir-II; PS-86 Karachi Malir-III; PS-87 Karachi Malir-IV; PS-88 Karachi Malir-V; PS-89 Karachi Malir-VI

Area
  - District of Sindh: 2,160 km^{2} (830 sq mi)
- Elevation: 11 m (36 ft)

Population (2023)
  - District of Sindh: 2,419,736
  - Density: 1,120/km^{2} (2,900/sq mi)
  - Urban: 1,155,058
  - Rural: 1,264,678
- Demonym: Karachiite

Literacy
  - Literacy rate: Total: 63.14%; Male: 67.74%; Female: 57.84%
- Time zone: UTC+05:00 (PKT)
  - Summer (DST): DST is not observed
- ZIP Code: 75050
- NWD (area) code: 021
- ISO 3166 code: PK-SD
- CNIC Code of Malir District: 42501-XXXXXXX-X
- Website: dcmalir.sindh.gov.pk

Malir District (Urdu: ضلع ملير) is an administrative district of Karachi Division in Sindh, Pakistan created in 1996 by bifurcation of District Karachi East. According to the 2023 Pakistani census, District Malir had a population of 2,419,736 (2.4 million).

== History ==
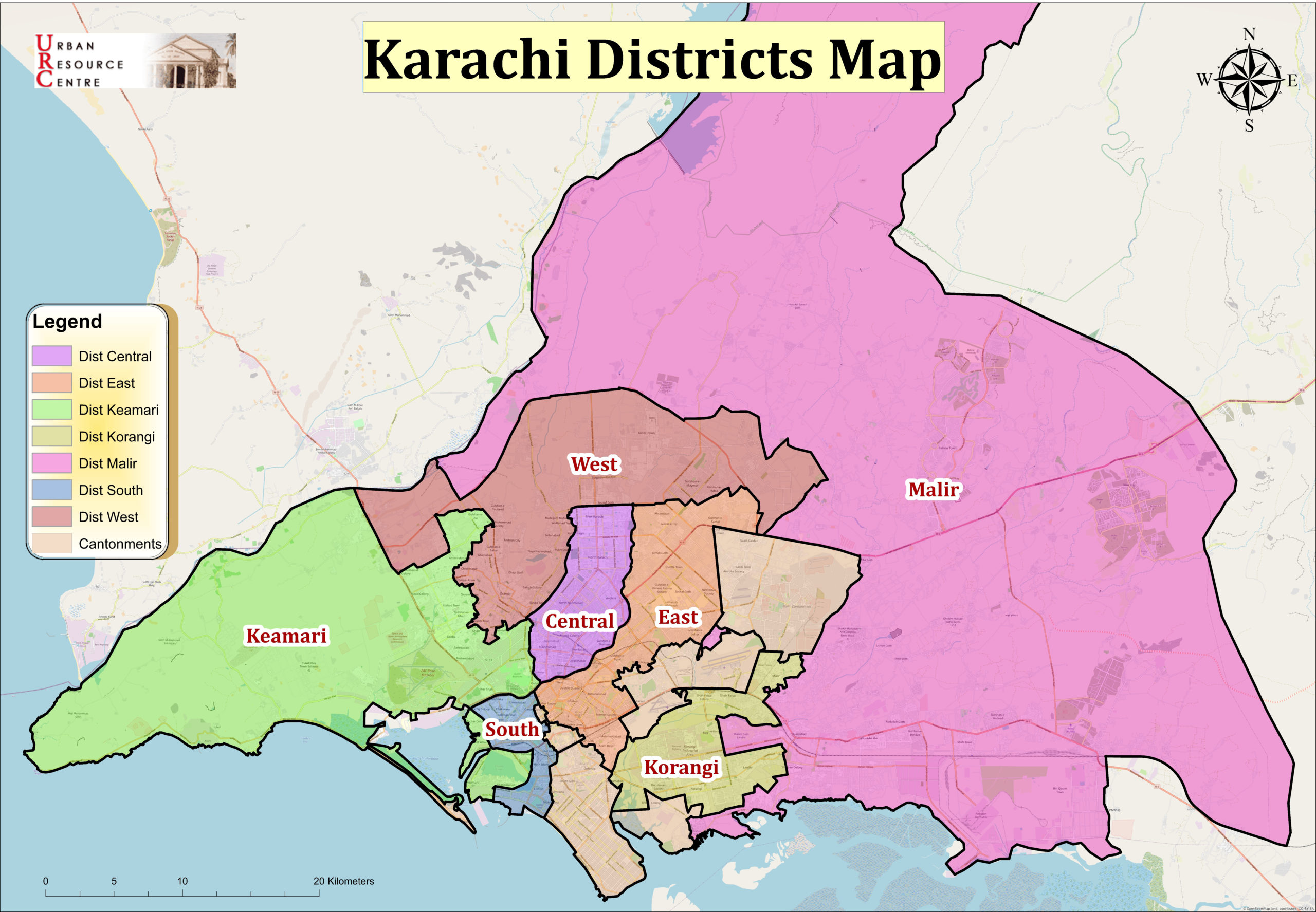
Districts of Karachi Division

Malir is a Sindhi word which means "greenery".

=== Battle of Malir ===
In the early 18th century, Malir became the focus of a military expedition by the Kalhora Dynasty. During this period, the Kalmati and Gabol Baloch groups were settled in the Malir area and exercised local control over the surrounding villages and routes. In the 1730s, relations between these groups and the Kalhora state deteriorated following disputes related to authority and compliance. In response, the Kalhora ruler Mian Ghulam Shah Kalhoro ordered a campaign against the Kalmati and Gabol settlements in Malir. The Kalhora forces, supported by allied Sindhi groups, advanced into the area and engaged the defenders in a large confrontation. The fighting resulted in the defeat of the Kalmati and Gabol forces, including the deaths of their leading figures, which effectively ended their resistance in Malir. Following this campaign, the Kalmati and Gabol groups withdrew from the region, and Malir was brought under direct Kalhora control.

=== Pre 1947 ===
Before the independence of Pakistan, there were large villages of Sindhi and some Kalmati Baloch in Gadap Town and Malir Town of modern Karachi. Now both towns have developed as the suburbs of the city because of the urban sprawl.

=== Countryside ===
Malir has been regarded in history as the countryside of Karachi City due to its open atmosphere and lush green farms, but now these are no more.

=== Agriculture land ===
Malir was once famous for its fruit and vegetable farms; but, now due to severe scarcity of groundwater, these farmlands are being converted into residential areas, thus increasing urbanization and environmental degradation. The Society for Conservation and Protection of Environment (SCOPE) has been concerned about drought and desertification in Malir district and has launched a campaign against illegal sand and gravel mining in the dry river beds of the Malir and its tributaries. Sand and gravel mining cause lowering of ground water, as rainwater cannot percolate in the aquifer. SCOPE is developing rainwater reservoirs in drought affected rural areas.

== Politics ==
The Pakistan People's Party (PPP) has historically dominated elections in Malir District, winning all National Assembly and Provincial Assembly seats in recent elections.

PPP's popularity in Malir attributed to demographics and its historical development projects. The district has a large Sindhi- and Balochi-speaking population in rural and semi-urban areas, who traditionally support PPP.

In the 1970s, under the leadership of Prime Minister Zulfiqar Ali Bhutto, several landmark industrial projects were initiated in the Bin Qasim subdivision of Malir District:

- Port Qasim – The foundation stone was laid in 1973 by Bhutto to create Pakistan's second deep-water port.
- Pakistan Steel Mills – Conceived and built during Bhutto's tenure, located near Port Qasim, it became Pakistan's first integrated steel plant and one of the largest industrial complexes in the country.
- Pakistan Machine Tool Factory (PMTF) – Established in 1968 in Karachi and expanded under Bhutto, it provided a machinery base for Pakistan's industrialization and is situated near the Bin Qasim industrial area.

These industrial projects brought employment and infrastructure to Malir, reinforcing PPP's political base and long-term popularity in the district.

== Administrative status ==
Malir District was established in 1996.

Malir District was abolished in 2000 and divided into three towns namely:

- Gadap Town,
- Malir Town
- and Bin Qasim Town.

On 11 July 2011, Sindh Government restored again Malir District.

As per the Sindh Local Government Act, 2021, Sindh government replaced the previous seven District Municipal Corporations (DMCs) with 26 towns, each with its own municipal committee. Malir District has three towns.

- Gadap Town
- Malir Town
- Ibrahim Hyderi Town

Headed by the TMC Chairman.

== Town Municipal Corporations (TMC's) and Union Councils (UC's) ==
Gadap Town
Union Council
U.C. 1 Gadap
U.C. 2 Gaghar
U.C. 3 Pipri
U.C. 4 Gulshan-e-Hadeed
U.C. 5 Steel Town
U.C. 6 Saleh Muhammad Goth
U.C. 7 Murad Memon Goth
U.C. 8 Darsano Chana
U.C. 9 Shah Mureed

Malir Town
Union Council
U.C. 1 Gharibabad
U.C. 2 Dawood Goth
U.C. 3 Jafar-e-Tayyar
U.C. 4 Khuldabad
U.C. 5 Qaidabad
U.C. 6 Dawood Chowrangi
U.C. 7 Future Colony
U.C. 8 Sharafi Goth
U.C. 9 Bakhtawar Goth
U.C. 10 Bhittaiabad

Ibrahim Hyderi Town
Union Council
U.C. 1 Chaukhandi
U.C. 2 Shah Latif Town
U.C. 3 Cattle Colony
U.C. 4 Majeed Colony
U.C. 5 Muzzaffarabad
U.C. 6 Muslimabad
U.C. 7 Sher Pao colony
U.C. 8 Ibrahim Hyderi
U.C. 9 Chashma
U.C. 10 Rehri Goth
U.C. 11 Ali Akber Shah

== Administrative Sub-divisions (Tehsils) ==
Malir district is divided into Six subdivisions (tehsils).

Subdivision (Tehsil)	Area (km^{2})	Population (2023)	Density (ppl/km^{2})	Literacy Rate (2023)
Airport Subdivision	41	254,370	6,204.15	86.74%
Bin Qasim Subdivision	447	322,915	722.40	62.19%
Gadap Subdivision	1,104	100,351	90.90	58.94%
Ibrahim Hyderi Subdivision	97	1,341,638	13831.32	57.91%
Murad Memon Subdivision	195	376,987	1,933.27	71.88%
Shah Mureed Subdivision	276	35,987	130.39	47.90%
Malir District	2,160	2,432,248	1,126.04	63.14%

== Demographics ==
Historical population
Year	Pop.	±% p.a.
1961	...	—
1972	...	—
1981	...	—
1998	914,765	—
2017	1,924,346	+3.99%
2023	2,432,248	+3.98%

As of the 2023 census, Malir district has 421,426 households and a population of 2,432,248. The district has a sex ratio of 112.70 males to 100 females and a literacy rate of 63.14%: 67.74% for males and 57.84% for females. 624,172 (25.8% of the surveyed population) are under 10 years of age. 1,166,340 (47.95%) live in urban areas.

Religions in Malir district (2023)
Religion	Percent
Islam	96.45%
Christianity	1.82%
Hinduism	1.66%
Other or not stated	0.07%

The majority religion is Islam, with 96.45% of the population. Christianity is practiced by 1.82% and Hinduism (including Scheduled Castes) is practiced by 1.66% of the population.

=== Languages ===
Languages of Malir district (2023)
1. Sindhi (35.0%)
2. Pashto (18.7%)
3. Urdu (14.8%)
4. Punjabi (9.90%)
5. Balochi (7.90%)
6. Hindko (5.69%)
7. Saraiki (3.22%)
8. Others (4.79%)

At the time of the 2023 census, 35% of the population spoke Sindhi, 18.71% Pashto, 14.79% Urdu, 9.94% Punjabi, 7.9% Balochi, 5.69% Hindko and 3.22% Saraiki And 4.79% others as their first language.

== See also ==
- Divisions of Pakistan
  - Divisions of Balochistan
  - Divisions of Khyber Pakhtunkhwa
  - Divisions of Punjab
  - Divisions of Sindh
  - Divisions of Azad Kashmir
  - Divisions of Gilgit-Baltistan
- Tehsils of Pakistan
  - Tehsils of Punjab, Pakistan
  - Tehsils of Khyber Pakhtunkhwa, Pakistan
  - Tehsils of Balochistan, Pakistan
  - Tehsils of Sindh, Pakistan
  - Tehsils of Azad Kashmir
  - Tehsils of Gilgit-Baltistan
- Districts of Pakistan
  - Districts of Khyber Pakhtunkhwa, Pakistan
  - Districts of Punjab, Pakistan
  - Districts of Balochistan, Pakistan
  - Districts of Sindh, Pakistan
  - Districts of Azad Kashmir
  - Districts of Gilgit-Baltistan
- Malir Development Authority
- Malir (disambiguation)
- Malir Expressway Project
- Malir River
- Malir Cantonment
- Malir Cantonment railway station
