= Gadap Town =

Residential town in Sindh, Pakistan

Coordinates: 25.0508°N 67.0226°E

Gadap Town گڏاپ ٽائون گڈاپ ٹاؤن
- Subdivision of Malir District/Constituent Town of Karachi
- Interactive map of Gadap Town
- Country: Pakistan
- Province: Sindh
- Division: Karachi
- District: Malir District
- Established: 2022
- Union Councils: 9: UC1- Gadap UC2- Gaghar UC3- Pipri UC4- Gulshan-e-Hadeed UC5- Steel Town UC6- Saleh Muhammad UC7- Murad Memon Goth UC8- Darsano Chana UC9- Shah Mureed

Government
  - Type: Subdivision (Tehsil)/TMC
  - Assistant Commissioner: Mr. Babur Ali, PAS
  - TMC, Chairman: Tariq Aziz Baloch

Population (2023 Census of Pakistan)
  - Total: 100,351 (Gadap Sub-division)
- Website: https://tmcgadap.gos.pk/

Gadap Town (Urdu: گڈاپ ٹاؤن) is an administrative subdivision (tehsil) and a constituent Town of Malir District in the northwestern part of Karachi with the Hub River on its western limits also forming the provincial border between Sindh and Balochistan, while to the north and east are Jamshoro District and the Kirthar Mountains.

== History ==
As per the Sindh Local Government Act, 2021, the Sindh government replaced the previous seven District Municipal Corporations (DMCs) of Karachi with 26 towns, each governed by its own Town Municipal Committee (TMC).

Under this restructured local government system, Malir District was divided into three towns:

Malir Town

Gadap Town

Ibrahim Hyderi Town

The town system in Karachi has undergone several changes over the years. Gadap Town was originally established in 2001 under the Local Government Ordinance 2001 as part of the then newly introduced town system. However, this system was disbanded in 2011 when local governments were dissolved and replaced with administrators.

In 2022, the town system was reintroduced under the amended Local Government Act, 2021, ahead of the local government elections. Gadap Town was reinstated as one of the three towns within Malir District, alongside Malir Town and Ibrahim Hyderi Town.

Gadap Town encompasses the areas of Gadap, Shah Mureed, Ibrahim Hyderi, and parts of Bin Qasim and spans approximately 1,200 km², making it one of Karachi's largest towns by area.

== Demographics & Population Statistics ==
The ethnic group in Gadap town includes, Sindhis,Punjabis,Pashtuns, Balochs, Muhajirs, Saraikis,Kashmiris,Hindkowans ,Memons, Bohra ,Kutchis and many more

== See also ==
- City District Government
