= Economy of Sindh =

Economy of a province of Pakistan

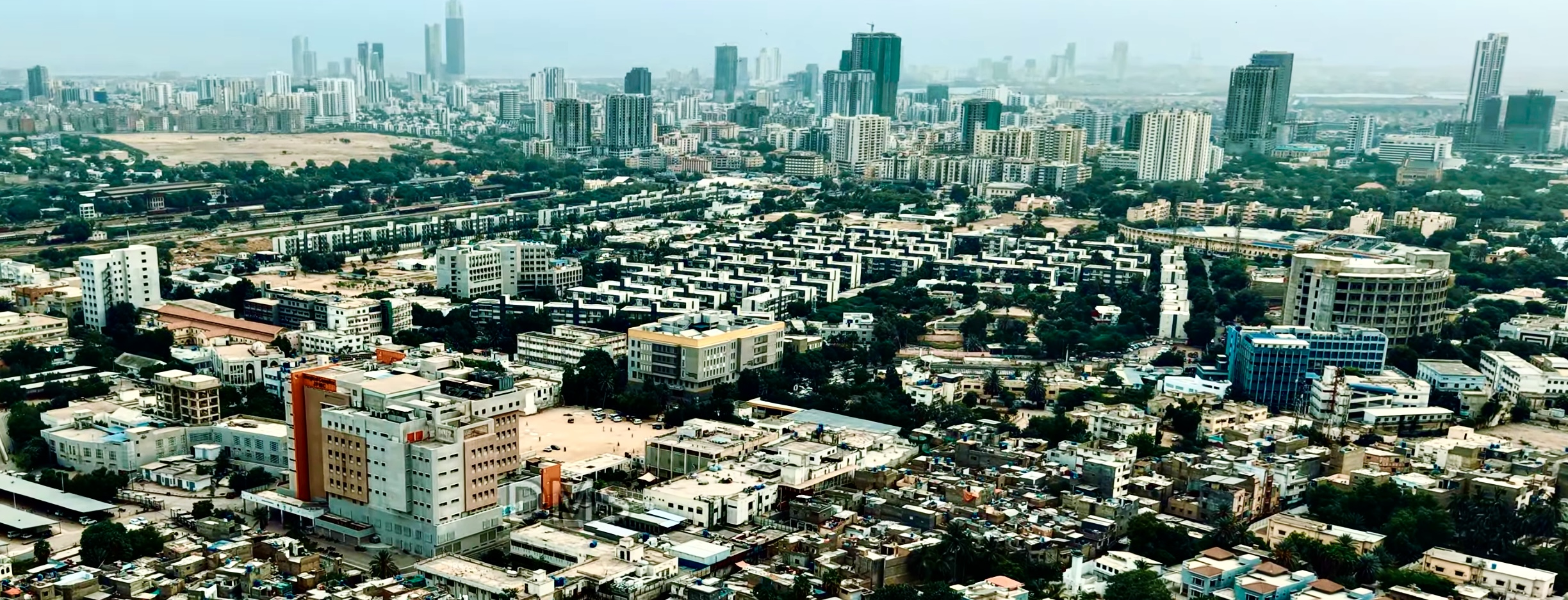
A view of Karachi Skyline, the capital of Sindh province

== History ==
The economy of Sindh is the largest of all the provinces in Pakistan and the history of affluence is tied to the prestige of the founding banking houses on I.I. Chundrigar Road and the Karachi Stock Exchange. The economy of Sindh in Pakistan is a continuation of the legacies of the Mughal Empire and the Great Families of Pakistan. The origins of Pakistan's banking and monetary financial system are in the roots of Muhammad Ali Jinnah's speech, "The opening of the State Bank of Pakistan symbolizes the sovereignty of our State in the financial sphere".

Sindh's financial sector with its roots in I.I.Chundrigar Road has for many years ranked in top indices and has led to the amalgamation of indices into the Pakistan Stock Exchange. Pakistan's and Sindh's banking industry includes many a prominent names such as, Sindh Bank, Bestway, Allied Bank Limited, Askari Bank, MCB Bank, Habib Bank Limited Habib Bank Ag Zurich, Habib Canadian Bank, Habib Metro, Faysal Bank, National Bank of Pakistan, State Bank of Pakistan, Bank AL Habib, Bank Alfalah.

Much of Sindh's economy is influenced by the economy of Karachi, the largest city and economic capital of the country and Historically, Sindh's contribution to Pakistan's GDP has been between 30% and 32.7%. Its share in the service sector has ranged from 21% to 27.8% and in the agriculture sector from 21.4% to 27.7%. Performance-wise, its best sector is the advanced manufacturing sector, where its share has ranged from 36.7% to 46.5%. Karachi is also home to an advanced international trade, finance, supply chain and logistics industry with significant share in the services sector Since 1972, Sindh's GDP has expanded by 3.6 times.

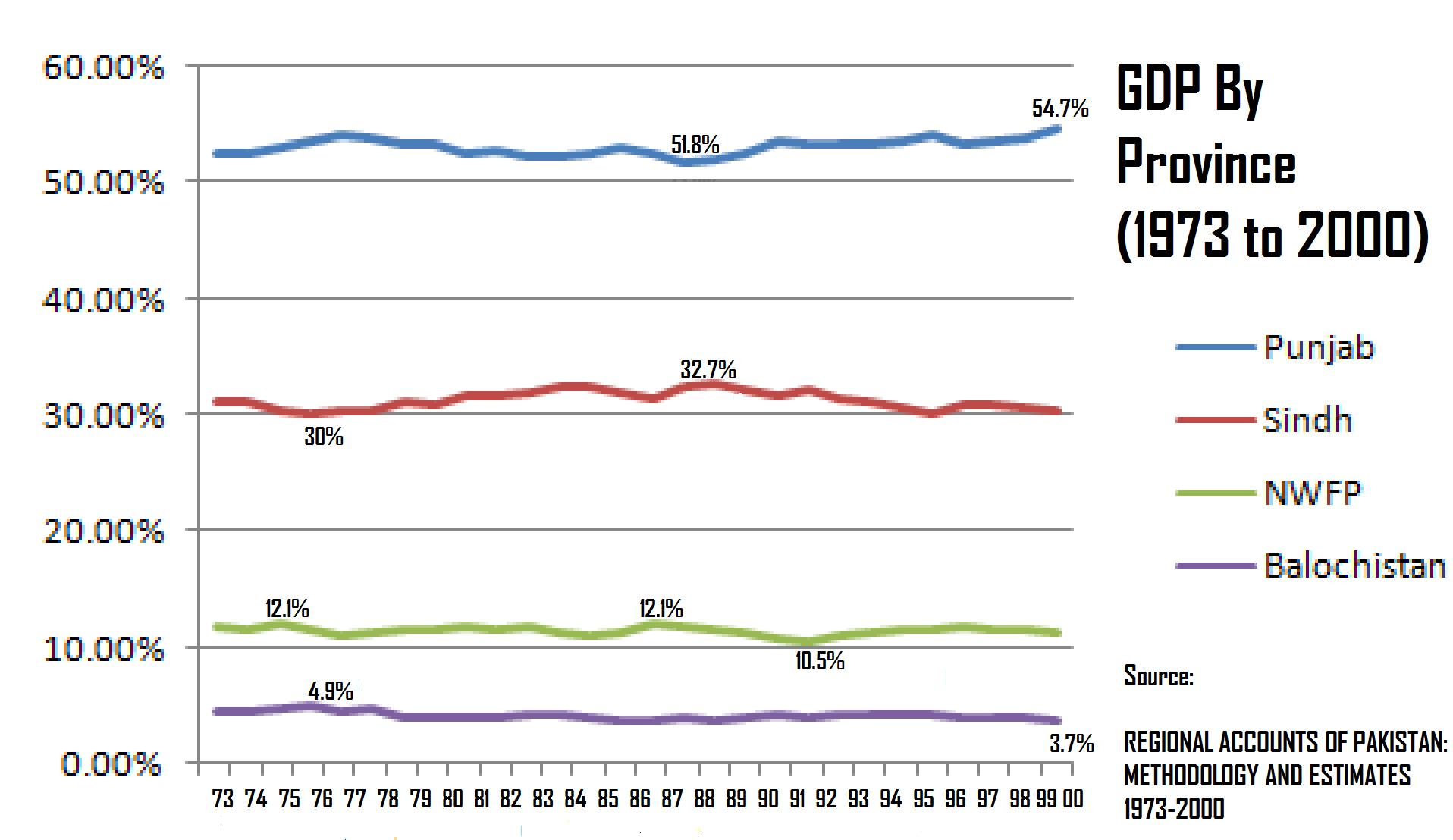
GDP by province

== Geography ==
With coastal access through the port city of Karachi, Sindh is a centre of international trade and economic activity in Pakistan. It has a diversified economy ranging from Advanced Materials and finance centered in and around Karachi to an agricultural base along the Indus. Major industries include Textiles, cotton and organic cotton, cement, chemicals, fertilizers, petrochemicals, food processing, rice, sugar, steel, Pakistan steel mills, and advanced materials.

Sindh is a large producer of manufactured goods and is also a momentously important international trade and supply chain and logistics hub due to the close proximity to technologically advanced seaports and airports. Port of Karachi is one of the largest ports connecting with Port of Dubai and Port of Oman.Pakistan's Airports connect to flights globally.

Karachi is one of the largest cities in Sindh is also considered a major financial and trade hub for the country and is home to several universities, D.J. Sindh Government Science College, Sindh University, University of Karachi, NED University of Engineering & Technology, Dow University of Health Sciences, Institute of Business Administration, Karachi, Habib University, Greenwich University, Karachi, Government College of Commerce & Economics, Jamia Binoria, Darul Uloom Karachi, Federal Urdu University, Ziauddin University, Adamjee Government Science College, Shaheed Zulfikar Ali Bhutto Institute of Science and Technology, Aisha Bawany Academy, St. Patrick's College (Karachi) and Cambridge University Press and Assessment sponsored by British Council, Karachi.

Hyderabad, Pakistan is an important cultural and tourist hub of Sindh with many prominent cultural sites important to the legacy of the province and country.

The economy of Sukkur is an important city in Pakistan as a major Indus River city vital for irrigation (Sukkur Barrage), a historical hub (Indus Valley Civilization remnants like Makli Necropolis and Mohenjo-daro, a significant industrial and trade center (textiles, cement, biscuits), and a growing transportation/tourism node, especially with the M5 motorway connecting it to Multan for religious tourism and commerce. Other engineering marvels include examples of Mughal architecture such as Shah Jahan Mosque, Thatta and Sukkur IBA University.

== Industry ==
Sindh's Banking and Financial Sector has gained much prominence on a global scale. The success of Pakistani Banking has spawned many investment houses and brokerage firms in Pakistan. Notably Arif Habib Limited, JS Global Capital, AKD Securities, BMA Capital Management, and Adamjee Insurance.

Agriculture plays an important role in Sindh with cotton, rice, wheat, sugar cane, bananas, and mangoes as the most important crops. The largest and finer quality of rice is produced in Larkano district.

Sindh is a rich province in natural resources of gas, petrol, and coal. The Mari Gas field is the biggest producer of natural gas in the country, with companies like Pakistan Petroleum, Pakistan State Oil, Oil & Gas Development Company, Mari Petroleum. Thar coalfield also includes a large lignite deposit.

Sindh produces significant amounts of agriculture products. Engro Corporation, Fauji Fertilizer Company, Shan Foods, National Foods Limited producing large scale agriculture based products. Agriculture is the strength of Pakistan’s economy, contributing 19.2% to the GDP and employing 37.4% of the labor force (Pakistan Economic Survey, 2022–23). Sindh plays a central role in national development, the province of Sindh, blessed with fertile lands and the life-sustaining waters of the Indus River, accounts for 23% of Pakistan’s total agricultural output, cultivating essential crops such as cotton, rice, wheat, and sugarcane (Sindh Bureau of Statistics, 2023).

The economy of Sindh produces large amounts of textiles and luxury goods. Karachi, Sindh has many industrial areas developed for the production of luxury items. Karachi, Sindh houses many industrial areas and universities, specifically for the production of luxury goods such as textiles. North Karachi Industrial Area Bin Qasim Industrial Zone, Federal B Industrial Area, Karachi Export Processing Zone, Korangi Creek Industrial Park, Korangi Industrial Area, Pakistan Textile City, S.I.T.E Industrial Area, West Wharf Industrial Area and schools such as Iqra University, Textile Institute of Pakistan.

Sindh is home to a robust private and public health care sector. Pakistan's public and private health sectors are run in parallel. Health sciences companies include the likes of the following, Novartis, Roche, Novo Nordisk, Johnson and Johnson, Eli Lilly and Company, Merck, Hamdard Pakistan, Ferozsons, Edhi Foundation and Rangoonwala Neurosurgery Centre, JPMC. The Department of Neurosurgery at JPMC is one of the oldest of its kind in South Asia.

Sindh's IT sector includes many prominent names such as Compaq, Lenovo, Microsoft, IBM, Apple, iCreativez Technologies, Contour Software Pvt. Ltd, 10 Pearls, Arpatech 5, Gaditek, Systems Limited, Folio3 Pvt Ltd, Viftech Solutions Pvt Ltd, Mangotech Solutions, TRG Tech.

Furthermore, Karachi, Sindh also has many companies in the fields of robotics.

Sindh's automotive sector is developed over the years including many companies such as Pak Suzuki Motors, Toyota, Toyota Indus, Atlas Honda, Al-Ghazi Tractors Ltd (AGTL), Al Haj FAW Motors, Dewan Farooque Motors, Yamaha, Ghandhara Nissan, Isuzu Pakistan, Hinopak Motors, Lucky Motor Corporation (LMC), and Master Motors.

Karachi, houses Pakistan's prominent media companies such as Jang Media Group, Dawn, KTN News, Express Media Group, ARY Group, The New International, Pakistan Press International, Network News International, Business Recorder.

Sukkur and Hyderabad, Pakistan hold many monuments from the era of the Mughal Empire. The province is home to many institutional partnerships that explore histories and seek to advance and preserve the legacies of the country.

Karachi, Pakistan has shopping districts hosting many shopping malls located in the heart of the city as well as on the beach front. Karachi and Lahore are known for producing cultural food cuisines and hosting food streets throughout the country.

== Tourism ==
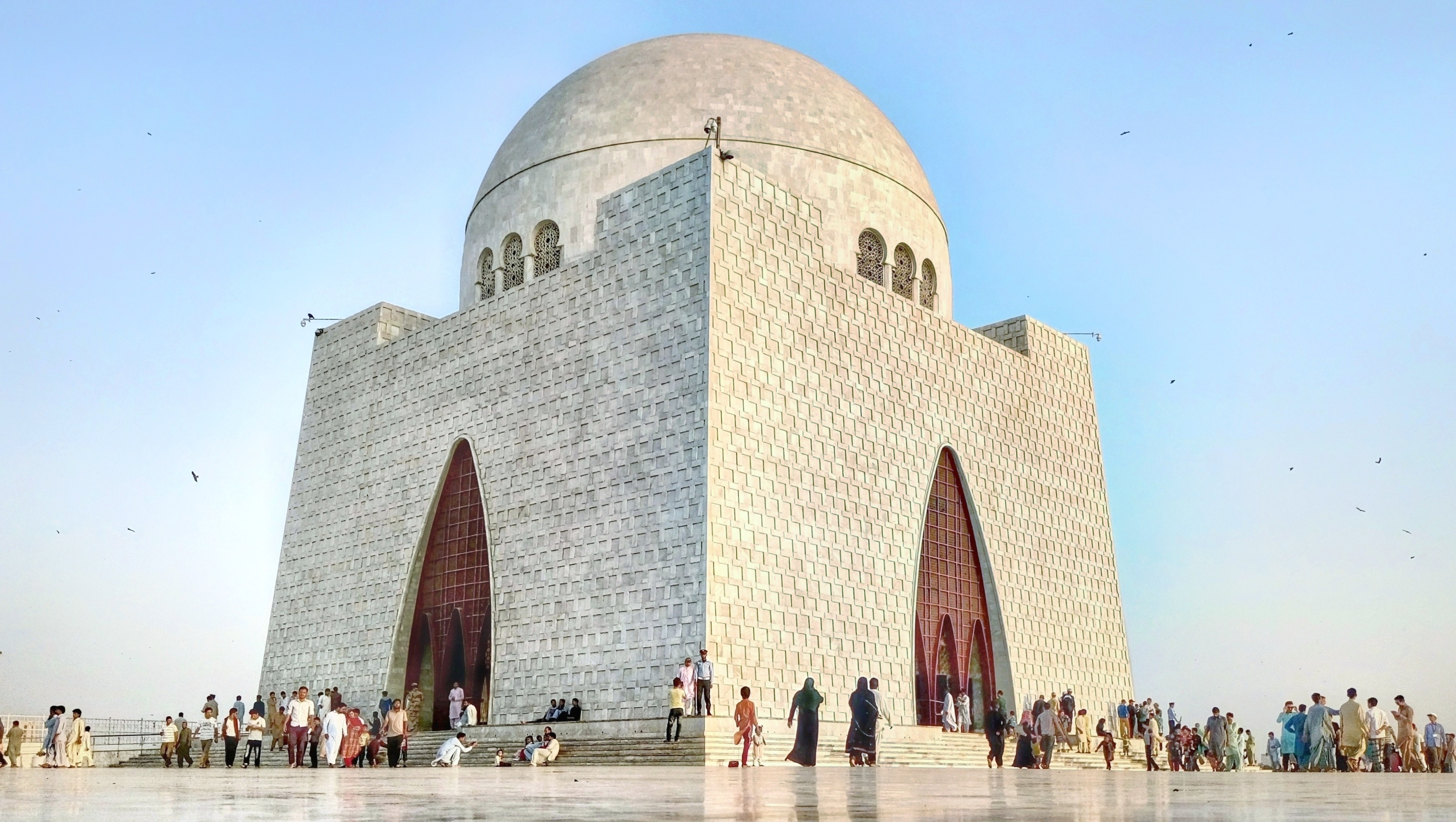
Mazar-e-Quaid in Karachi

Sindh is a province in Pakistan.

The province includes a number of important historical sites. The Indus Valley civilization (IVC) was a Bronze Age civilization (mature period 2600–1900 BC) which was centred mostly in the Sindh. Sindh has numerous tourist sites with the most prominent being the ruins of Mohenjo-daro near the city of Larkana. Islamic architecture is quite prominent as well as colonial and post-partition sites. Natural sites, like Manchar Lake have increasingly been a source of sustainable tourism in the province.

Tourism generates revenue for the province, which is an industrial hub that receives visits from international dignitaries. The province hosts religious and cultural sites, as well as preserved legacy monuments, making religious tourism a source of revenue. Its features include beachfront areas, shopping malls, and a local food culture.

== See also ==
- Sindh
- Clifton, Karachi
- Tourism in Sindh
- Economy of Karachi
- Economy of Pakistan
- Sindh Cities Improvement Program
- Port of Karachi
- Automotive industry in Pakistan
- Textile industry in Pakistan
- Hyderabad, Pakistan
- Sukkur
