= Industries in Karachi =

Industry in Karachi are the various industries that are located in Karachi, Pakistan. The commerce and industry in Karachi represents major economic activities in Pakistan. Pakistan ranks 40 among the countries of the world in nominal GDP, and number 55 in the world in factory output. Pakistan's industrial sector accounts for about 24% of GDP.

Industry is the production of goods or services within an economy. Manufacturing industry became a key sector of production and labor in European and North American countries during the Industrial Revolution, upsetting previous mercantile and feudal economies. This occurred through many successive rapid advances in technology, such as the production of steel and coal.

There are many cottage industries in the city as well. Karachi is also known as software outsourcing hub of Pakistan. It has a rapidly flourishing 'Free Zone' with an annual growth rate of nearly 6.5 percent. An expo center has also been set up in Karachi, which hosts many regional and international exhibitions including the IDEAS Defence Exhibition. Dozens of new manufacturing units are also being built near the Pakistan Steel Mill. Farm businesses line the Super Highway route. The Sindh Industrial Trading Estate (SITE) in Manghopir is the biggest industrial area of Pakistan. Other industrial zones are located in Landhi, Korangi, Federal B Area, North Karachi and Port Qasim.

Karachi is also home of major automobile manufacturing companies. Toyota is in the process of increasing production capacity to over 120,000 units per annum. Suzuki Motor Company is also located in Karachi. The manufacturing plant located in Bin Qasim has a production capacity of 150,000 vehicles per year. Among others, Millat Tractors, Daihatsu, Hinopak Buses and Trucks manufacturing plants are also located in Karachi.

== Shipyard ==
Karachi Shipyard and Engineering Works Limited is the oldest Heavy Engineering Works of Pakistan which is catering for its Ship Building, Ship Repairing, Submarine/Warship Construction and Heavy/General Engineering requirements. KSEW was established in early 1950s as a project of PIDC. It was incorporated as a public limited company in 1957. The shipyard spread over an area of 29 hectares (71 acres). KSEW has a large Ship Building Hall, three Ship Building Berths, two Dry Docks, three Foundries (Iron, Steel & Non-Ferrous), Fabrication Shops, one machine shop and other supporting facilities like Carpentry, Pipe Fitting and Light Steel Fabrication Shop. KSEW is working as an autonomous commercial organization under the Ministry of Defense, Government of Pakistan.

== Steel Mills ==
Pakistan Steel Mills is the current largest industrial corporation undertaking having a production capacity of 1.1—5.0 million tonnes of steel and iron foundries. Built with the contributions of the Soviet Union in the 1970s, it is the largest industrial mega corporation complex, vastly expanded in an enormous dimensions construction inputs, involving the use of 1.29Mn cubic meters of concrete; 5.70Mn cubic meters of earth work; and contains ~330,000 tonnes of heavy machinery, steel structures and electrical equipment.

Tuwairqi Steel Mills Limited is a vertically integrated multinational Steel mill in Karachi. An environmentally friendly and established by a private sector, the steel mill is co-financed by the Al-Tuwairqi Holdings (Saudi Arabia), POSCO (South Korea) and Arif Habib Steel Mill (Pakistan), and currently aiming to compete against the Pakistan Steel Mills (PSM) at the Karachi Stock Exchange (KSE) indexes. The steel mills is well expanded over an area of 220 acres (0.89 km^{2}) at Bin Qasim, Karachi and employs the world's most advanced DRI (Direct Reduction of Iron) technology of the Midrex process owned by Kobe Steel of Japan.

== Automotive ==
The major world automakers have set up assembly plants in Karachi with joint ventures with local companies these include Toyota, Honda, Suzuki and Nissan Motors. While Pak Suzuki success in Pakistan owes to lack of options among the buyers however Pak Suzuki is a major assembler in Pakistan providing jobs and also exporting vehicles to various countries. Pak Suzuki Motors is a Pakistani subsidiary of Japanese automaker Suzuki has assembly plant in Karachi. It is the Pakistani assembler and distributor of cars manufactured by Suzuki and its subsidiaries and foreign divisions. Currently Pak Suzuki is the largest car assembler in Pakistan.

== Industrial Parks ==
- Bin Qasim Industrial Zone
- Federal B Industrial Area
- Karachi Export Processing Zone
- Korangi Creek Industrial Park
- Korangi Industrial Area
- North Karachi Industrial Area
- Pakistan Textile City
- S.I.T.E Industrial Area
- West Wharf Industrial Area

== See also ==
- Economy of Karachi
