= Economy of Karachi =

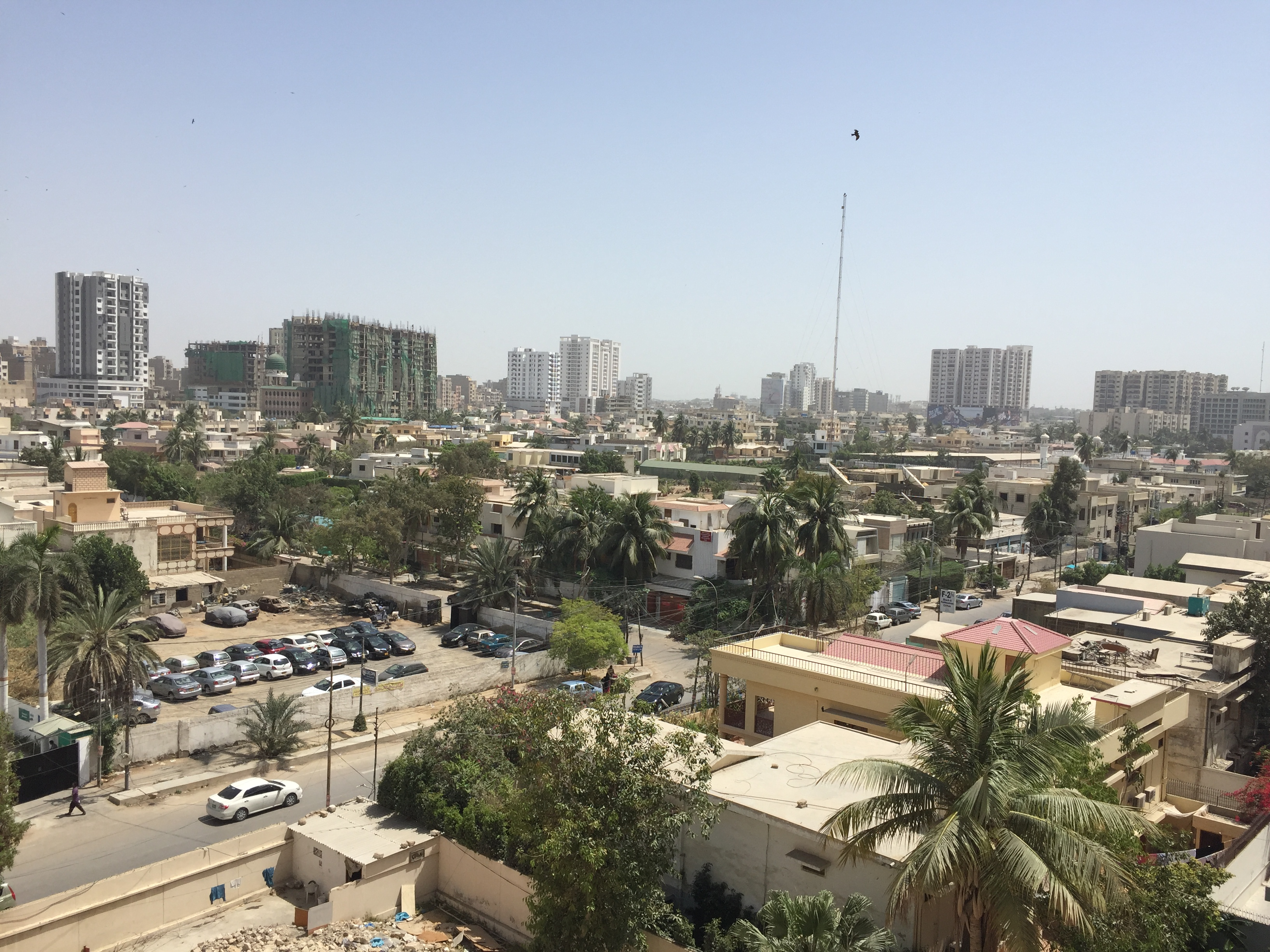
Clifton is fast becoming residential and commercial hub of Karachi

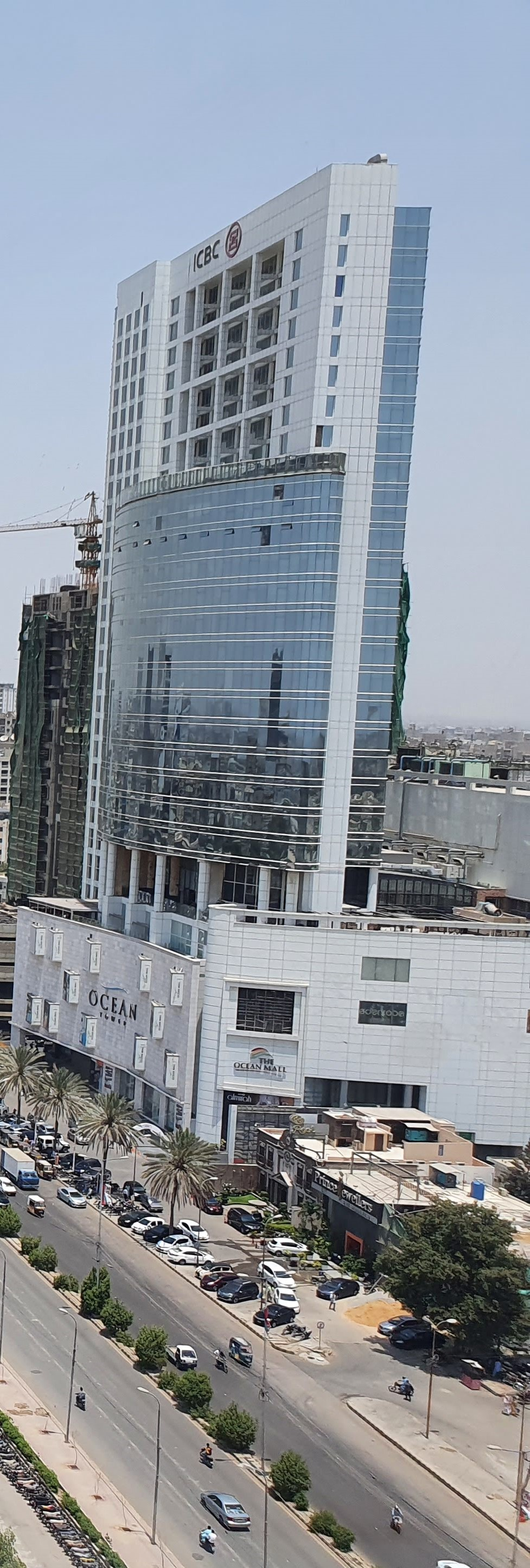
ICBC Tower in Clifton Karachi

Karachi is the financial and industrial capital of Pakistan. As of 2019, Karachi has an estimated GDP (PPP) of $164 billion. The city accounts about half of the total collections of the Federal Board of Revenue, out of which, approximately half are customs duty and sales tax on imports. Karachi produces about 30 percent of value added in large-scale manufacturing, 25% of the GDP, the World Bank identified Karachi as the most business-friendly city in Pakistan. In 2010, research by the global human resources company Mercer found Karachi to be the most inexpensive city in the world.

== GDP ==
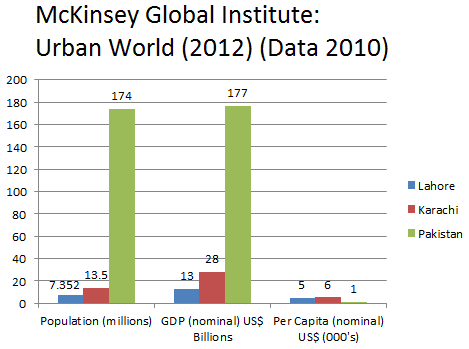
Pakistan and its two largest city economies. Source:

A substantial chunk of Sindh’s GDP, around 95% is attributed to Karachi (the GDP of Sindh as a percentage of Pakistan’s total GDP has traditionally hovered around 25%/30%). Karachi’s GDP was estimate in 2015 to be around 25% of the total GDP of Pakistan. As of 2014, it was reported as $114 billion. A PricewaterhouseCoopers study released in 2009, which surveyed the 2008 GDP of the top cities in the world, calculated Karachi’s GDP (PPP) to be $75 billion (projected to be $193 billion in 2025 at a growth rate of 5.5%). It confirmed Karachi’s status as Pakistan’s largest economy, well ahead of the next two biggest cities Lahore and Faisalabad, which had a reported GDP (PPP) in 2008 of $40 billion and $20.5 billion, respectively. Karachi's high GDP is based on its large industrial base, with a high dependency also on the financial services sector. Textiles, cement, steel, heavy machinery, chemicals, food, banking and insurance are the major industrial sectors contributing to Karachi's GDP.

== Revenue collection ==
In line with its status as a major port and the country's largest metropolis, it accounts for most of Pakistan's revenue generation. According to the Pakistan Federal Board of Revenue's 2006-2007 year-book, tax and customs units in Karachi were responsible for 70.75% of direct taxes, 33.65% of federal excise tax, and 23.38% of domestic sales tax. Karachi also accounts for 75.14% of customs duty and 79% of sales tax on imports. Therefore, Karachi collects a significant 53.38% of the total collections of the Federal Board of Revenue, out of which 53.33% are customs duty and sales tax on imports. Revenue collected from Karachi includes revenue from some other areas since the Large Tax Unit (LTU) Karachi and Regional Tax Offices (RTOs) Karachi, Hyderabad, Sukkur and Quetta cover the entire province of Sindh and Baluchistan. Karachi's contribution to national revenue is around 55%.

== Business districts ==
I. I. Chundrigar Road (formerly McLeod Road), also known as the Wall Street of the city, remains the historical commercial hub of Karachi and is its main CBD. However over the years, notable business and trade activity has appeared in other conurbations of the city, including the Shahrah-e-Faisal thoroughfare, MT Khan road, Mai Kolachi road and the Clifton and Defence areas of the city.

== IT trends ==
The recent trend of ICT (information and communications technology), electronic media and call centres has become a significant part of Karachi business hierarchy. Call centres for foreign companies have been targeted as a significant area of growth, with the government making efforts to reduce taxes by as much as 80 percent in order to gain foreign investments in the IT sector.

Even Dr. Arif Alvi, President of Pakistan, has launched an initiative to help promote education, research and business opportunities in Artificial Intelligence, Blockchain, and Cloud-based computing which will educate IT technology to 10,000 students annually.

Karachi has more than 3000 Software Companies and growing day by day which accounts to almost half of the whole countries IT Industry.

== Media ==
The city has also firmly established itself as the electronic media capital of the country; most of Pakistan's media television channels are headquartered here, including Abbtakk News, CNBC Pakistan, Dawn News, TV One, Indus Media Group, ARY Digital, BOL Network, AAJ TV, KTN NEWS, KTN, KASHISH TV and Geo TV. They generate huge revenues for the city in advertising and provide jobs and entertainment. As a sign of the growing strength of the electronic media sector, GEO TV is planning to start an additional 10 channels and for this purpose is setting up a 50-acre (200,000 m^{2}) studio in the city.

== Pakistan Stock Exchange ==
Pakistan Stock Exchange, formerly Karachi Stock Exchange is Pakistan's largest and oldest stock exchange with at least 540 companies listed during 2020.

It was declared the “Best Performing Stock Market of the World for the year 2002” with KSE-100 returning 112.2%.

According to Bloomberg, Pakistan ranked third in 2014. And for the third consecutive year was among top 10 markets in the world (Source). International magazine "Business Week" declared KSE as one of the Best Performing Markets of the world. Similarly, the US newspaper "USA Today" termed Karachi Stock Exchange as one of the best performing bourses in the world.

By September, 2020, the year of global crisis and recession, PSX-100 was leading the global markets in correction with a return at 38.5% making PSX the best performer in Asia and fourth-best performing stock market in the world.

== Industry ==
There are many cottage industries in the city as well. Karachi is also known as software outsourcing hub of Pakistan. It has a rapidly flourishing 'Free Zone' with an annual growth rate of nearly 6.5 percent. An expo center has also been set up in Karachi, which hosts many regional and international exhibitions including the IDEAS Defence Exhibition. Dozens of new manufacturing units are also being built near the Pakistan Steel Mill. Farm businesses line the SuperHighway route. The Sindh Industrial Trading Estate (SITE) in Manghopir is the biggest industrial area of Pakistan. Other industrial zones are located in Landhi, Korangi, FB Area, North Karachi and Port Qasim.

Karachi is also home of major automobile manufacturing companies. Toyota is in the process of increasing production capacity to over 120,000 units per annum. Suzuki Motor Company is also located in Karachi. The manufacturing plant located in Bin Qasim has a production capacity of 150,000 vehicles per year. Among others, Millat Tractors, Daihatsu, HinoPak Buses and Trucks manufacturing plants are also located in Karachi. The now-defunct Adam Motor Company was formerly located in the city.

Work is being done to promote the development of higher value added textile products, most notably by Ayesha Tammy Haq, an attorney who also has a television talk show. She set up Pakistan Fashion Week, a showcase for Pakistan's emerging fashion industry.

The industrial estates in Karachi.

Name of Estate	Location	Established	Area in Acres
SITE Karachi	SITE Town	1947	4700
Korangi Industrial Area	Korangi Town	1960	8500
Landhi Industrial Area	Landhi Town	1949	11000
North Karachi Industrial Area	New Karachi Town	1974	725
Federal B Industrial Area	Gulberg Town	1987	
Korangi Creek Industrial Park	Korangi Creek Cantonment		250
Bin Qasim Industrial Zone	Bin Qasim Town	1970	25000
Karachi Export Processing Zone	Landhi Town	1980	315
Pakistan Textile City	Bin Qasim Town	2004	1250
West Wharf Industrial Area	Keamari Town		430
SITE Super Highway Phase-I	Super Highway	1983	300
SITE Super Highway Phase-II	Super Highway	1992	1000

== Banking sector ==
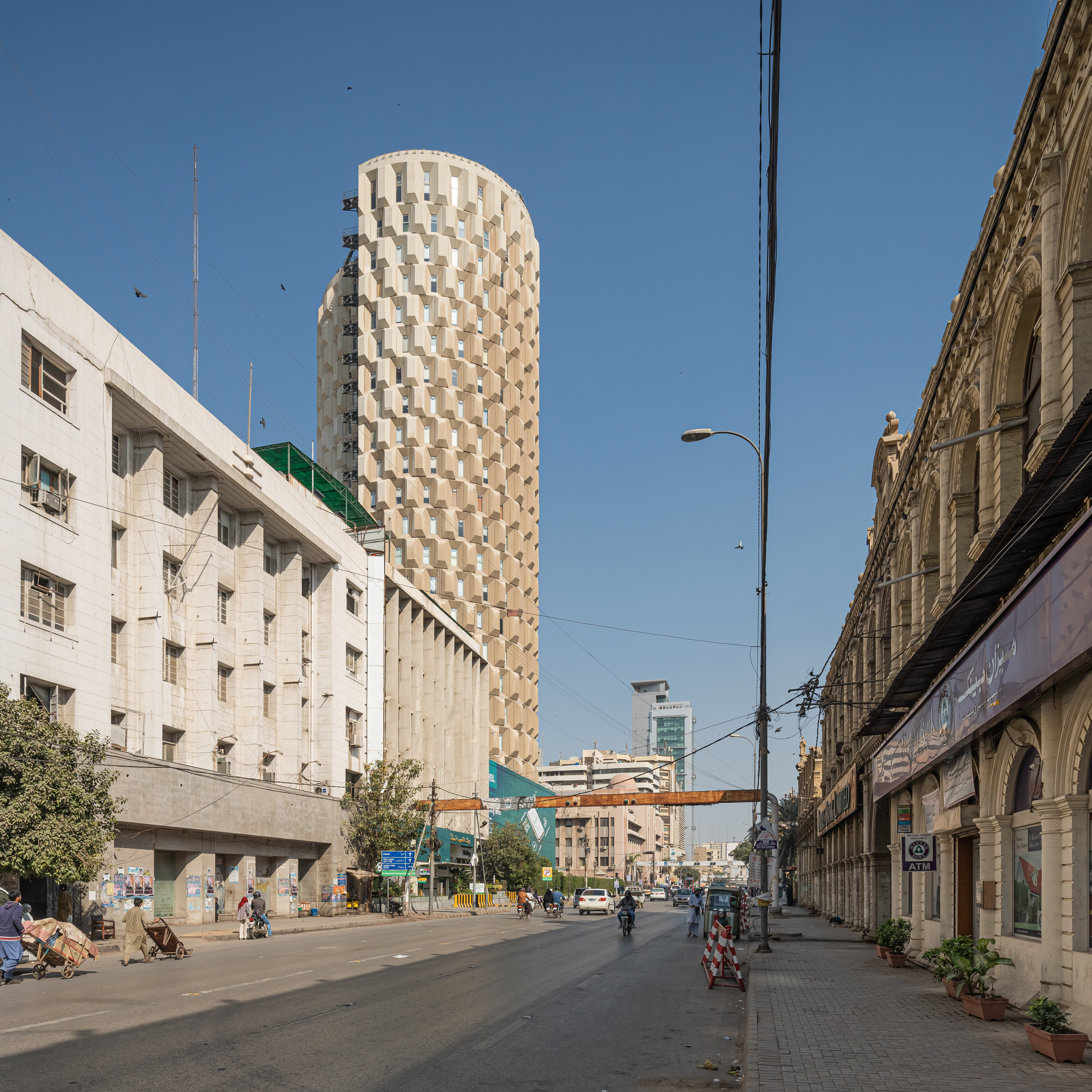
View of the I. I. Chundrigar Road, heart of the financial district of Karachi

Karachi is the hub for Pakistan's banking and financial services sector and is home to Pakistan's Central Bank, the State Bank of Pakistan.

Nearly all banks that operate in Pakistan have their corporate headquarters in the city. These include:

- Arif Habib Limited
- Atlas Bank
- Bank AL Habib
- Bank Alfalah
- Barclays Pakistan
- Faysal Bank, Karachi
- Habib Bank
- Habib Metropolitan Bank
- HSBC Ltd, Karachi
- JS Bank
- KASB Bank
- MCB Bank Limited (formerly Muslim Commercial Bank)
- MyBank
- NIB Bank
- SAMBA Bank Limited
- Silkbank Limited
- Soneri Bank
- RBS Pakistan
- The Bank of Tokyo-Mitsubishi UFJ Limited
- United Bank Limited

== Trade Logistics ==
Despite the growth and development of transport infrastructure elsewhere in the country, Karachi remains the country's transport hub. The city's two ports, Port of Karachi (Pakistan's largest) and Port Qasim, are central to nearly all shipping in Pakistan. The airport of Karachi, Jinnah International Airport (also known as Quaid-e-Azam International Airport) is the largest and busiest airport in Pakistan and handles 6 million passengers a year. The airport also receives the largest number of foreign airlines; a total of 27 airlines fly to Jinnah International, predominantly from the Middle East and South East Asia. All of Pakistan's airlines use Karachi as their primary hub, including Pakistan International Airlines, Aero Asia International and Airblue.

== Fisheries ==
Karachi is the biggest fishery hub in Pakistan. Fisheries play an important role in Karachi's economy. They provide employment to about 300,000 fishermen directly. In addition, another 400,000 people are employed in ancillary industries. It is also a major source of export earning. The Karachi Fish Harbour and Korangi Fish Harbour are two major fish harbours in Karachi. Fish are one of Karachi's main exports.

== Challenges ==
Karachi is allegedly the worst affected by controversial population census '17 placing it at 14.91 million, whereas all estimates and reality checks point above 30 million. With about 1100 km^{2} of city proper, the population density would stand beyond 30,000 per km^{2}, thereby ranking it at least 6th most dense city proper. The courts have been moved on the matter of 5% census audit. As of Q1-2021, even 2017 census is not published due to controversies and litigation.

That alone causes a spread of issues branching from flawed allocation of funds and representation in Parliament to housing, to mass transit, to environment and just about every facet of life in urban and suburbs.

Beyond that the city faces governance crisis bound by provisions of 18th Amendment in Constitution of Pakistan, giving all local body formation powers in hand of Province, with absolutely no room for intervention by federation; Rendering it a provincial dictatorship. Sindh Local Government Act 2013, thereby took away major municipal authorizations from Karachi Metropolitan Corporation under Mayor's Office, including planning and development, building control, solid waste management, water supply, sewerage and the like.

Beyond centralizing powers, the city, formerly a district, was declared a division, towns abolished in favor of independent districts, the count standing at 7 as of September 2020. This, along with presence of 6 cantonment boards covering allegedly at least 60% of city, introduced a divide in city's management and thence centralizing the co-ordination in hands of provincially administered bodies; The damage of which was evident from chaos prevailing after August 2020 record rains and urban floods bringing commercial activity and peace to a halt, killing over 100 and displacing thousands.

== See also ==
- Karachi Chamber of Commerce & Industry
- Demographics of Karachi
- Economy of Pakistan
- Politics of Karachi
- Karachi Stock Exchange
- Economy of Pakistan
- List of banks in Pakistan
- List of companies of Pakistan
