= MasterChef Pakistan season 1 =

فصل ۱
- Season 1
- Promotional poster of season 1
- No. of episodes: 26

Release
- Original network: Urdu 1
- Original release: 3 May – 27 July 2014

MasterChef Pakistan (Urdu: استاد باورچی پاکستان / ماسٹر شیف پاکستان) is a Pakistani competitive cooking reality television game show based on the original British MasterChef. The first season, began on 3 May 2014, and aired on Urdu 1. The show aired two episodes weekly: one on Saturday and another on Sunday at the 21:00 PST prime-time slot. The first season was presented by Knorr and co-sponsorship rights were owned by Ariel while Shan Food Industries and 7 Up served as food providers.

The first season of MasterChef Pakistan was won by Ammara Noman who defeated Gulnaz and Madiha in series Finale on 27 July 2014. Ammara received series title, PKR 5 million and a contract of her own recipe book. Gulnaz stood as a runner-up and received Rs. 1 million with a series trophy while Madiha came up as 2nd runner-up and received Rs. 500,000 and a series trophy.

== Regional auditions ==
Audition were held at the following places. The listing is in chronological order:

Audition city	Date	Audition venue	References	Red aprons
Islamabad, Islamabad Capital Territory	13 March 2014	N/A	N/A	N/A
Lahore, Punjab	17–19 March 2014	Royal Palm Golf and Country Club		N/A
Karachi, Sindh	22–24 March 2014	Port Grand Food and Entertainment Complex		N/A
Total number of MasterChef aprons given:				100

Auditions for the first series occurred only in three metropolises: the capitol Islamabad, the Heart Lahore and the industrial hub Karachi. People showed enthusiasm for the auditions. In Lahore auditions days were extended due to their great reception, and in Karachi, auditions were extended for two more days.

=== Audition structure ===
The auditions for season 1 of MasterChef Pakistan followed almost the same format as of the MasterChef series, similar to Australia and India. There were three rounds, the first being the open call audition advertised. Auditioners registered themselves via forms at the series' website, and then called for auditions at the venue, to which they bring their cold dishes. Those who gain two yeses from the judges then gain the red apron for the next round.

In the second round, the selected auditioners face a live cooking challenge, where in one hour they have to present their dishes to the judges. Half of those who attended are eliminated at this stage, and the rest are "white apron" auditioners selected to proceed further.

In the third round, half of those selected have to face a boot camp challenge where their cutting skills and speed are judged. Here a further selection occurs, with only 16 or 17 participants moving on.

In the first season, unlike India and Australia, MasterChef did not air audition episodes, but directly aired with the selected initial contestants. The first season follows the live cooking challenge round and the boot camp challenge.

== Judges ==
The first season of the series was hosted and judged by the following panel of acclaimed Pakistani chefs:

- Chef Zakir Qureshi
- Chef Mehboob Khan
- Khurram Awan

== Challenges prior to finals ==
=== Live cooking challenge ===
After the regional auditions in Islamabad, Lahore and Karachi, the judges selected 100 contestants who came from all over Pakistan to venues. All 100 contestants faced a live cooking challenge, where they were given one hour to present their dishes to the judges. From among these contestants, the pool of contestants was narrowed down to 50 by giving a white apron to each, for the next round.

=== Boot camp challenge ===
The second phase was the boot camp challenge, where the selected 50 contestants' cutting and techniques of cooking were judged by giving them different kitchen chores. Here a further selection occurred, and the top 50 were narrowed down to the final top 16. Boot camp included two or three phases in order to select the last final contestants who would fight for the series' title.

== Contestants ==
=== Opening week ===
The opening week of MasterChef Pakistan saw 100 contestants competing for the 16 positions in the main competition. After facing the live cooking challenge, the top 50 were revealed in the second episode. They then faced the boot camp challenge. The top 30 were shown in episode 3. Finally after facing the last boot camp challenge, the top 16 were revealed, who would appear in the main competition.

=== Top 16 ===
The full top 16 were revealed on Sunday, 11 May.

Place	Contestant	Age	Hometown	Occupation	Status
1	Ammara Noman	33	KHI	Housewife	Winner on 27 July 2014
2	Gulnaz Khan	31	CHL	Housewife	Runner-Up on 27 July 2014
3	Madiha Khalid	22	ISD	Student	Third Place on 27 July 2014
4	Amna Ashraf	24	FSD	Dentist	Eliminated 26 July
5	Rayyan Durrani	29	KHI	B2B specialist	Eliminated 26 July
6	Khurram Haroon	42	LHR	Carpet exporter	Eliminated 20 July
7	Zain Rashid	26	PHR	Fashion designer	Eliminated 19 July
8	Saad Alavi	41	KHI	Business executive	Eliminated 13 July
9	Mariam Nida	28	LHR	Teacher	Eliminated 6 July
10	Iqra Yasin	27	KHI	Tax consultant, CA	Eliminated 29 June
11	Sidrah Kazi	23	KHI	Student	Eliminated 22 June
12	Azam Hafeez	40	KHI	Self-employed	Eliminated 15 June
13	Mudassir Ilyas	37	KHI	Manager	Eliminated 8 June
14	Aneela Qamar	39	FSD	Housewife	Eliminated 1 June
15	Adnan Qureshi	31	ISB	Development professional, ANP	Eliminated 25 May
16	Ali Shah Bin Saad	18	KHI	Student	Eliminated 18 May

== Guest judges ==
The following celebrity chefs appears as guest judges in the series:

- Chef Shai - Elimination Challenge 4, week 6.
- Chef Saddat Siddiqi - Elimination Challenge 6, week 8

== Episodes ==
The following is the complete happening of MasterChef Pakistan (series 1) from auditions to finals.

Ep#/Wk-Ep#	Title	Original release date	Prod. code
Week 1
1–1	"Series Premiere: Live Cooking Challenge 1"	3 May 2014	1001
Series started with the selected 100 contestants from auditions. Where 100 selected contestants have to face Live cooking challenge in order to secure position among Top 50
2–2	"Live Cooking Challenge 2"	4 May 2014	1002
Live cooking Challenge last for another day.
Week 2
3–1	"Live Cooking Challenge 3 / Boot Camp Challenge 1"	10 May 2014	1003
Top 50 were selected after finishing of Live Cooking Challenge 3. Boot Camp Challenge began in Expo Center Karachi, where Top 50s cooking, cutting skills were judged and contestants pool were narrowed down to 20, while rest of 30 were put on hold by giving last chance to 10 contestants to secure position in Top 30
4–2	"Boot Camp Challenge 2 / Boot Camp Challenge 3"	11 May 2014	1004
Boot Camp Challenge 2, began with the hold-up 30 contestants where they were given a challenge to peel and cut the potatoes in french fries standard form, among them 10 were selected who joined the earlier 20 contestants. Boot Camp Challenge 3 wrapped up with the 30 contestants in Moin Khan Academy where they were given a BBQ challenge and their first time-pressure one hour challenge. On the basis of their dishes, Judges finally selected and revealed Top 16 finalists who will competes for the series main competition, in MasterChef Kitchen.
Week 3
5–1	"Egg Challenge / Signature Dish Challenge"	17 May 2014	1005
Top 16 face their first challenge in MasterChef Kitchen. Judges revealed the first challenge core ingredient Egg, all the contestants had to make a dish in which egg used as a main ingredient, they were given thirty minutes to complete the challenge, Judges selected only five dishes based on the Challenge requirement, Taste and presentation. Mariam, Rayyan, Zain, Saad and Amina came out as a challenge toppers, among them Mariam won the challenge and awarded an extra minute in pantry for next challenge. In second challenge contestants had to make their signature's dishes in which they are excelled, in this challenge Ammara, Mudassir and Rayyan became the Top 3, while Ammara won the challenge and became the first person to win Immunity pin and automatically saved from the following day challenge. Anila, Ali and Iqra appears as a Bottom 3. Judges surprise the contestants that elimination has been rescind due to their great effort and enthusiasm.
6–2	"Elimination Challenge 1"	18 May 2014	1006
Contestants face Egg white stiffness challenge in which they had to whip the egg white to such extent, so that it became stiff and they had to put the content containing bowl on their heads in downwards position for at least ten seconds to show that egg white is completely whipped and stiff. Zain won the challenge by doing it first and was given a chance to make an extra dish for next challenge by choosing only one ingredients containing plate among three provided individually by all Judges, Zain selected Chef Mehboob's plate to make dessert. In second challenge all the contestants had to face the Mystery Box Challenge, with the ingredients provided in Box they had to make one main course dish and one dessert. Rayyan, Ammara and Madiha turns up as a Top 3 contestants, while Madiha become the Mystery Box Challenge winner. Anila, Adnan and Ali comes in Bottom 3 and while Ali became the first contestant to be eliminated at 16th position on 18 May 2014.
Week 4
7–1	"Biryani Challenge"	24 May 2014	1007
Ali Shah gets eliminated, while Anila and Adnan join top 15. Aftermath episode challenge was revealed, all the contestants had to make biryani by using different meats. Madiha was given an advantage as the winner of previous challenge, that she could select the meat for her biryani and which ever meat she chose, others would be unable to select that meat; she had to name any one contestant whom she sees as her competitor and select a meat for that person. She chose Rayyan and selected fish for his biryani. Anila, Ammara and Madiha became the Top 3 of challenge and Madiha crowned as the challenge winner, while Amina, Rayyan, Saad, Adnan and Azam comes in Bottom 5.
8–2	"Elimination Challenge 2"	25 May 2014	1008
MasterChef Kitchen saw first elimination challenge with Bottom 5. In first challenge Bottom 5 had to make a dessert in a time span of thirty minutes, among them Amina won the challenge and was saved from the next challenge. In second challenge Bottom 4 had to prepare Indian thaal, Rayyan, Azam and Saad join the Top 14 while Adnan gets eliminated.
Week 5
9–1	"Off Site Challenge 1"	31 May 2014	1009
In week 5, all the contestants face their first outdoor kitchen team challenge at Port Grand. Madiha was chosen captain for first team by judges as an advantage of being winner in Biryani Challenge, and Saad was chosen captain for second team on the basis of leadership. Both captains had to choose Red and Blue Apron blindly from the box, whichever apron they choose they had to lead that team, Saad choose Red while Madiha became the captain of blue team, while rest of the contestants had to follow the same process, according to their chosen apron they become the part of relative team. Rayyan, Anila, Amna, Sidra, Gulnaz and Mariam chose Blue Apron, while Muddasir, Khurrum, Zain, Amara, Azam and Iqra chose Red Apron. Team Blue was given bun kebab and jalebi while Team Red had to prepare paratha sandwich/roll and gulab jamun. Team Red was announced as the challenge winner based on the votes given by customers. The entire losing Blue team had to face the elimination challenge and from them one will be eliminated.
10–2	"Elimination Challenge 3"	1 June 2014	1010
Entire Blue team face elimination challenge, where they had to make the signature dish of chef Zakir Reshmi Chicken, they were given a time span of 90 minutes, with the advantage of pantry being open for whole time. Amna, Sidra and Gulnaz became Top 3 and get saved while Rayyan, Madiha, Marriam and Anila came as Bottom 4, among them Anila gets eliminated on the basis of her dish representation and taste.
Week 6
11–1	"International Cuisine Challenge"	7 June 2014	1011
Top 13 were given International Cuisine Challenge, in which they had to make dishes according to the given Flags of different countries hidden in their drawer. They were given four minutes in pantry for their items, while a buzzer table was placed, when turns green indicates that contestants can go to pantry if they need, otherwise they were not allowed to enter the pantry after since they first entered. Amna, Sidra, Saad, Azam and Gulnaz came up as a Top 5 of the challenge, while among them Gulnaz won the challenge and gained Immunity for next challenge, for this challenge no bottom count was announced.
12–2	"Elimination Challenge 4"	8 June 2014	1012
Contestants faces their fourth elimination challenge. Celebrity Chef Shai was invited as a guest mentor to judge the contestants. In the first twenty minutes contestants had to make any kind of salad for guest judge, and Saad was announced winner. In second challenge they had to prepare Signature dish of Chef Shai called "tenderloin medallion". As the winner of previous challenge Saad was given an advantage that he can take the help of Chef Shai for ten minutes. Among them Ammara, Amna, Khurram, Madiha, and Mudassir appears as a Bottom 5, While Mudassir gets eliminated on the basis of his dish, for this challenge no Top count was evolved.
Week 7
13–1	"Off Site Challenge 2"	14 June 2014	1013
All the top 12 face their second team challenge at Haque Academy, where they had to prepare food for children. Azam Selected as a Captain of Red team which includes Amna, Rayyan, Zain, Saad, Iqra on the basis of a withdraw of knife from holder engraved with contestants name by Iqra. while Mariyam selected as a Captain of Blue team which includes Madiha, Sidra, Ammara, Khurram and Gulnaz by a Azam who withdrawal knife engraved with her name. Both team had to decide their own meal, Red Team decided to make beef burger, french fries and muffin while Blue Team made pizza, french fries and cupcakes. Blue team won the challenge by beating Red Team with 40 votes over 21 including Judges votes. Entire Red Team went on to face the elimination challenge 5.
14–2	"Elimination Challenge 5"	16 June 2014	1014
Red Team contestants faced elimination challenge, as a result of losing the previous challenge. Contestants were given Mystery Box, from which they had to select any six ingredients. After they select they were asked to exchange their ingredients from the contestant back to them. Rayyan and Amna top the challenge, but there was not official Top count or winner, while Azam was eliminated on the basis of his dish results.
Week 8
15–1	"Quail Challenge"	21 June 2014	1015
Contestants were given challenge of making Quail (بڑیر) meat which they were deselect in previous challenges. Moreover pantry passes were given which they can use only once during cooking after selecting ingredients for first time. Judges announces that they will choose two Top dishes, and among them winner will get Immunity and the second one will get Advantage. On the basis of dishes Amna and Mariam appears as Top 2 contestants while Amna won and gets immune from elimination challenge but still she has to appear in next challenge and Mariam gets advantages which she will get to know in next challenge.
16–2	"Elimination Challenge 6"	22 June 2014	1016
Chef Saddat Siddiqi was invited as a Guest Chef, where contestants were given Celebrity Chef Challenge in which they had to make Chef Saddat Signature dish. Advantage was announced to Mariam that she can take help of Chef Saddat twice. Khurram, Zain and Amara appears as a Top 3 where Zain won the Challenge and Gulnaz, Sida and Saad came in Bottom 3 while Sidra was eliminated on the basis of her dish.
Week 9
17–1	"Provisional cuisine challenge"	28 June 2014	1017
Contestants were given Provisional cuisine Challenge in which they had to make dishes of different provinces of Pakistan. Being the winner of previous challenge Zain had advantage at which he was allowed to change his pre-selected cuisine card with another contestant. Khurrum, Mariam, Gulnaz appears as a Top 3, but concludes four winner of challenge announcing Amna in Top 4. While Gulnaz became winner and got immunity pin, which she can use in any challenge to get saved.
18–2	"Elimination Challenge 7"	29 June 2014	1018
Contestants face elimination, in which they were given pasta challenge and a second core ingredient which they had to cook with Pasta. Khurram, Amara and Zain appears as a Top 3 while Khurram became winner of the challenge and Mariam, Madiha and Iqra appears as a Bottom 3. Iqra eliminates on the basis of her dish.
Week 10
19–1	"Offal's challenge"	5 July 2014	1019
Contestants were given Offals challenge in which they had to prepare their dishes by variety of organ meats of different butchered animals using their internal organs and entrails. Khurrum was given advantage to start his work 10 minutes earlier than other contestants and had a chance to subtract 10 minutes of any contestant to whom he considered his competitor, as per being the winner of previous challenge. Judges also announce that they will only choose Top 3 contestants and they will be safe from next elimination challenge and all top 3 will serve as a judges with them in next challenge. Madiha, Amara and Zain appears as a Top 3 on the basis of their dishes.
20–2	"Elimination Challenge 8"	6 July 2014	1020
Remaining unsafe contestants face elimination challenge where they were given Iftar challenge, in which they had to prepare Iftar food which prepared in Muslims Holy month Ramadan. As per winner of previous challenge Amamara, Zain and Mdiha judged the contestants dishes with judges. Gulnaz, Mariam and Khurrum appears as a Bottom 3, while Mariam gets eliminated on the basis of her dish.
Week 11
21–1	"Off Site Challenge 3"	12 July 2014	1021
Contestants face their third offsite challenge in À la carte "La Mamma" restaurant of Mövenpick Hotels & Resorts, where two groups of eight were divided by the judges and team captain were chosen by the unanimous decision of the teams. After deciding the menu they were given three hours preparation time. On the basis of their food quality, taste, presentation and service, Team Red, which includes Rayyan, Gulnaz, Madiha and Mariam, won the challenge voted by customers and judges while entire Team Red which includes Saad, Khurram, Zain and Amna went into elimination challenge.
22–2	"Elimination Challenge 9"	13 July 2014	1022
Team Blue face elimination challenge after losing previous outdoor challenge, All the four contestants were given advantage challenge in which they had to taste different Shan spice mixes to guess their names, Amna won the challenge by guessing correct names of spices and get saved from the elimination challenge. Khurrum, Saad and Zain were given kofta (meatballs) challenge in which they were asked to prepare different type of koftas dishes of their own choice. Khurrum and Zain were saved while Saad was eliminated on the basis of his dish.
Week 12
23–1	"Mystery Box Challenge"	19 July 2014	1023
Contestants face mystery box challenge in which they have to prepare dishes made of duck meat. Judges announce that every episode elimination will be carried out till Grand finale. Gulnaz, Amna and Zain appears as a Bottom 3, while Zain gets eliminated on the basis of his dish.
24–2	"Quarter Final"	20 July 2014	1024
The Top 6 compete in the Quarter Finals for Semi-Finals. They were given the challenge to make a cake with at least three layers of different types in four hours with limited time for the Pantry. Gulnaz used her immunity pin and qualified for the Semi-Finals. Amna and Khurram appeared as the Bottom 2, while Khurram eliminates on the basis of his dish.
Week 13
25–1	"Semi-Finale"	26 July 2014	1025
Contestants face the Semi-Finals to qualify for the Grand-Finale . They were given the challenge to make a dish for their Dream Restaurant and they had to name and price their dish. Ammara won the challenge and the advantage that her dish would be included in menu of MovenPick Hotel. Gulnaz and Madiha also qualified along with Ammara becoming the finalists. Rayyan and Amina got eliminated.
26–2	"Finale"	27 July 2014	1026
The Top 3 were given the final challenge to prepare a three-course meal, with an appetizer, main course and a dessert. Madiha stood as the 2nd Runner-up. Gulnaz was the Runner-up and Ammara became the First MasterChef Pakistan. The Winner got Rs. 5 million, a trophy, series title and her own cookbook deal.

== Elimination chart ==
	Week 1-2	Week 3		Week 4		Week 5		Week 6		Week 7		Week 8		Week 9		Week 10		Week 11		Week 12 Semi Final week		Week 13 Final week	
Mystery Box Challenge Winner	Audition rounds	Madiha		none		none		none		none		none		none		none		none		none^{[a]}		none	
Advantage Winner	Audition rounds	Mariam	Zain	Madiha	Amna	Madiha	none	none	Saad	none		Mariam	Zain	none	Khurram	none		none	Amna	none		none	
Celebrity Chef Challenge	Audition rounds	none		none		none		Lose: Amna; Khurrum; Muddasir; Mariam; Zain		none		Won: Zain		none		none		none		none		none	
Contestants	Results																						
Ammara	Top 16	Win	Top 3	IN	Win	Team Win	IN	IN	Btm 5	Team Win	Top 3	IN	Top 3	Win	Win	Win	Win	Team Win	IN	Safe	IN	Top 3	Winner
Gulnaz	Top 16	IN	IN	IN	IN	Team Lose	Win	Win	IN	Team Win	Top 3	IN	Btm 3	Win	IN	Win	Btm 3	Team Win	IN	Btm 3	Safe	Top 3	Runner Up
Madiha	Top 16	IN	Win	Top 3	IN	Team Lose	Btm 4	IN	Btm 5	Team Win	Win	IN	IN	IN	Btm 3	Top 3	IN	Team Win	Win	IN	IN	Top 3	2nd Runner-Up
Amna	Top 16	IN	IN	Btm 5	IN	Team Lose	Top 4	Top 5	Btm 5	Team Lose	IN	Win	IN	Top 4	IN	IN	IN	Team Lose	Safe	Btm 3	Btm 2	Btm 2	Eliminated (Ep 25)^{[c]}
Rayyan	Top 16	Top 3	Top 3	Btm 5	Btm 4	Team Lose	Btm 4	IN	IN	Team Lose	Win	IN	IN	Win	IN	IN	IN	Team Win	IN	IN	IN	Btm 2	Eliminated (Ep 25)
Khuram	Top 16	IN	Win	IN	IN	Team Win	IN	IN	Btm 5	Team Win	IN	IN	Top 3	Top 4	Top 3	IN	Btm 3	Team Lose	Btm 3	IN	Btm 2	Eliminated (Ep 24)	
Zain	Top 16	IN	Win	IN	IN	Team Win	Win	IN	IN	Team Lose	IN	IN	Top 3	IN	Top 3	Top 3	IN	Team Lose	Btm 3	Btm 3	Eliminated (Ep 23) ^{[b]}		
Saad	Top 16	IN	IN	Btm 5	Btm 4	Team Win	Top 4	Top 5	IN	Team Lose	Btm 2	IN	Btm 3	Win	IN	IN	IN	Team Lose	Btm 3	Eliminated (Ep 22)			
Mariam	Top 16	Top 3	IN	IN	IN	Team Lose	Btm 4	Win	IN	Team Win	IN	Top 2	IN	Top 4	Btm 3	IN	Btm 3	Eliminated (Ep 20)					
Iqra	Top 16	Btm 3	IN	Win	IN	Team Win	IN	IN	Win	Team Lose	IN	IN	IN	IN	Btm 3	Eliminated (Ep 18)							
Sidrah	Top 16	IN	IN	IN	IN	Team Lose	Top 4	Top 5	Win	Team Win	IN	IN	Btm 3	Eliminated (Ep 16)									
Azam	Top 16	IN	IN	Btm 5	Btm 4	Team Win	Win	Top 5	IN	Team Lose	Btm 2	Eliminated (Ep 14)											
Mudassir	Top 16	Top 3	IN	Win	IN	Team Win	IN	IN	Btm 5	Eliminated (Ep 12)													
Aneela	Top 16	Btm 3	Btm 3	Top 3	Win	Team Lose	Btm 4	Eliminated (Ep 10)															
Adnan	Top 16	IN	Btm 3	Btm 5	Btm 4	Eliminated (Ep 8)																	
Ali Shah	Top 16	Btm 3	Btm 3	Eliminated (Ep 6)																			
Notes	^{See note 1}	^{See note 2}	^{See note 3}	^{See note 4}	^{See note 5}	^{See note 6}	^{See note 7}	^{See note 8}	^{See note 9}	^{See note 10}	^{See note 11}	^{See note 12}	^{See note 13}	^{See note 14}	^{See note 15}	^{See note 16}	^{See note 17}	^{See note 18}	^{See note 19}	^{See note 20}	^{See note 21}	^{See note 22}	
Eliminated	None		Ali Shah	None	Adnan	None	Anila	None	Muddasir	None	Azam	None	Siddra	None	Iqra	None	Mariam	None	Saad	Zain	Khurram	Amina; Rayyan	

The chef consequently won immunity.
The chef consequently won immunity pin.
The chef consequently won Mystery Box Challenge.

- ^1 From week 1 to week 2, Live Cooking Challenges and Boot Camp Challenges occurs among the chosen 100 contestants from the auditions. Week 2 completes with the selection of Top 16 finalists for the series main competition.
- ^2 In week 3, Individual challenges were occur. In first challenge Mariam won the advantage. In second challenge Top 3 and Bottom 3 were evaluated, among Top 3, Ammara won the challenge and got Immunity for next challenge, while by looking at the contestants enthusiasm and effort, Judges decided the elimination to be expunged.
- ^3 In Egg stiffness challenge Zain won the advantage. In second part Mystery Box challenge were exhibited by contestants, in a result, Madiha won the challenge among Top 3, while Bottom 3 results were put on hold for next week to announce the elimination. Ali Shah eliminates as being in Bottom 3, while Anila and Adnan join Top 15.
- ^4 Madiha used his advantages as per winner from last challenge. Birriyani Challenge ends up with the Madiha, Anila and Ammara in Top 3, while Madiha become the challenge winner, while Amina, Adnan, Saad, Rayyan and Azam comes in Bottom 5, they have to face their first elimination challenge and among them who lose will be eliminated.
- ^5 Bottom 5 faces elimination challenge, Amna gets saved in first challenge after winning advantage, while Bottom 4 faces second challenge among them Adnan loses challenge and gets eliminated.
- ^6 Madiha became the captain of Blue of team as per the advantage of winning last challenge. Both Teams face outdoor challenge, the Red Team won and gets saved, while the entire losing Blue Team had to face elimination challenge in MasterChef Kitchen.
- ^7 Blue Team face elimination Challenge, Amna, Gulnaz and Sidra appears as Top 3, while Rayyan, Marriam, Madiha and Anila as Bottom 4, among them Anila gets eliminated
- ^8 Top 13, faces International Cuisine Challenge, Amna, Azam, Saad, Sidra and Gulnaz appears as a Top 5, there was no bottom count for this challenge.
- ^9 In first challenge Saad won the advantages as winner. Second challenge of Chef Shai ends up with Amna, Khurram, Muddasir, Mariam and Zain as bottom 5 among them Muddasir gets eliminated, there was no top count for this challenge.
- ^10 Contestants face their second outdoor challenge, in which Blue Team won the challenge and gets saved while, entire Red team appears as a Bottom 6 to face elimination challenge 5
- ^11 Red Team contestants faces Mystery Box elimination challenge, in which Azam gets eliminated, there was no top count.
- ^12 Amna and Marriam appears as Top 2, while Amna won Immunity and being on 2nd position Mariam won advantage.
- ^13 Contestants face Clebrity Chef Challenge, Sidra lose challenge after coming in Bottom 3 and gets eliminated, while Zain won the Challenge after appearing in Top 3.
- ^14 Amna, Khurrum, Matiam and Gulnaz appears as Top 4, while Gulnaz gets the immunity pin.
- ^15 Khurrum became the winner of challenge as being in Top 3 and Iqra eliminates as being in Bottom 3.
- ^16 Amara, Zain and Madiha were chosen as Top 3 on their dish basis, and they get saved from elimination challenge.
- ^17 Mariam gets eliminated after appearing in Bottom 3, there was no top count for that challenge.
- ^18 After facing Offsite challenge, Team Red get saved while other entire team went into elimination challenge.
- ^19 Mariam was in Bottom 4, but get saved after passing Advantage Challenge prior to final elimination challenge, while Saad gets eliminated after losing elimination challenge.
- ^20 Zain, Amna and Gulnaz appears as a Bottom 3, while zain gets eliminated on the basis of his dish results.
- ^21 Gulnaz used her Immunity pin and get saved before the challenge. While among Bottom 2, Khurrum gets eliminated from the series.
- ^22 Rayyan and Amna failed to reach the Finals and gets eliminated. Madiha, Gulnaz and Ammara appears as a Top 3 finalist of Season 1.

=== Notes ===
a: Mystery Box challenge were exhibited but there was no winner concluded, Judges only announced Bottom counts.
b: Judges announce that from now on to Grand Finale every episode, elimination will be carried out.
c: Double elimination occurs in semifinal round.

== See also ==
- MasterChef

New television show	MasterChef Pakistan season 1; 3 May 2014 - 27 July 2014	Succeeded by TBA
