= MasterChef Pakistan =

Pakistani cooking reality TV show

- Series logo and wordmark
- Genre: Reality television
- Created by: Franc Roddam
- Based on: MasterChef
- Judges: Zakir Qureshi; Mehboob Khan; Khurram Awan
- Country of origin: Pakistan
- Original language: Urdu
- No. of seasons: 2
- No. of episodes: 26 (list of episodes)

Production
- Executive producer: Ahmer Khan
- Producer: Parisa Siddiqi
- Production locations: Karachi, Sindh, Pakistan
- Camera setup: Multiple camera setup
- Running time: 40–50 minutes
- Production company: Paragon Productions

Original release
- Network: Urdu1
- Release: 3 May 2014 – present

Related
- Foodistan

MasterChef Pakistan (Urdu: استاد خانساماں پاکستان) is a Pakistani competitive cooking reality television game show based on the British show MasterChef. It was produced by Paragon Productions, an in-house production arm of Urdu 1, under licence from Shine Group. Restaurateur and Chef Khurram Awan, Chef Zakir Qureshi, and Chef Mehboob Khan served as the show's main judges and presenters.

The launch event for the series was held at Khursheed Mahal, Avari Towers Karachi on 7 April 2014. During the event, the curtain was raised and revealed the judges of the first series, Chef and Executive Asst. Manager Khurram Awan of Movenpick Hotels Karachi, celebrity Chef Zakir Qureshi, and Chef Mehboob Khan were revealed to be judging the contestants on a variety of cuisines which will be prepared by them on the show. The event was hosted by food enthusiast Sidra Iqbal. Peter Heyword, the high commissioner of Australia, was invited as a guest of honor for the inauguration of the franchise's first series in Pakistan.

The first episode of season one aired on 3 May 2014, and the series finale was broadcast on 3 August 2014. The first series was won by Ammara Noman, a 33-year-old housewife from Karachi. Knorr served as the main sponsor for season one and co-sponsorship rights are owned by Ariel, Shan, and 7 Up which are the main food transitories.

== Format ==
MasterChef Pakistan features a different format from that of the original British MasterChef and MasterChef Goes Large formats. Initial rounds consisted of a large number of hopeful contestants from across Pakistan individually "auditioning" by presenting a food dish before the three judges to gain one of 50 semi-final places. Entrants must be over 18 years old and their main source of income cannot come from preparing and cooking fresh food in a professional environment.

The semi-finalists then competed in several challenges which tested their food knowledge and preparation skills. As of Season 1, the top 50 would compete until 20 would be left, with the final 20 progressing to the main stage of the show. The contestants would then be whittled down through a number of individual and team-based cooking challenges and weekly elimination rounds until a winning MasterChef is crowned. The winner plays for a prize that includes chef training from leading professional chefs, the title of MasterChef, the chance to have their own recipe book published, and PKR 5,000,000 in cash, while the Runner-up and 2nd Runner up would be awarded Rs. 1 million and 500,000, with a series trophy, respectively.

=== Episodes ===
MasterChef Pakistan aired two episodes a week, Saturday and Sunday. Each episode featured a different format, however, some episodes modified the format slightly. The typical episode formats were as follows:

Saturday is the Challenge night. In season 1 it mainly featured theme-based challenges, including a Mystery Box, where each contestant was given the same box of ingredients and were to create a dish using only those ingredients. These dishes are then tasted, and a winner chosen. There can also be Off-Site Challenges and Team Challenges, which often involved cooking for large numbers of people. The top three contestants who made the best dishes are selected by the judges, from which a winner is chosen to compete in the Immunity Challenge or may be for Advantage. After this the bottom three are revealed, who will face off in an elimination challenge the next night. In the first series, it would always consist of a Theme challenge, then the winner from that would get saved from the face-off (elimination) challenge.

Sunday is the Elimination night. The bottoms from the theme challenge face the elimination challenge, which may include the Mystery Box challenge, Time pressure challenge, or some cooking techniques challenge. First season followed a simple format, meaning one day kitchen challenge, Team Challenge, Offsite challenge, or miscellaneous challenge and the other day they faced the consequences of the previous challenge.

== Judges and presenters ==
The first season of MasterChef Pakistan was hosted and presented by three professional and internationally-acclaimed Pakistani Chefs, Chef Zakir Qureshi, Chef Mehboob Khan, and Chef Khurram Awan. Chef Zakir Qureshi is a well-known Pakistani celebrity chef and cooking expert, he is famously known for his cooking show Dawat on Masala TV. He started his career in 1980 through Sheraton Hotel as a chef in Karachi. While Chef Mehboob Khan is a much older and well-known celebrity chef who started his career in the late 90s and gave his first appearance on a cooking show called The Cooking King and Spice of Life where he garnered great attention as a cooking expert after commencing shows of Healthy living life. Currently, he is exhibiting a show Weekend Masala on Masala TV. The third chef is a critic and food expert and off-screen internationally-acclaimed Pakistani Chef Khurrum Awan who served as a GM for a chain of hotels across the world and currently he is a Chief Executive Assistant of the Director of Food & Beverage at Mövenpick Hotels & Resorts in Karachi.

== Series synopsis ==
=== Season 1: 2014 ===
The show's first season premiered on 3 May 2014, with the selected 100 contestants from the auditions that occurred in three major cities in Pakistan: Lahore, Islamabad, and Karachi. Auditions started on 13 March and lasted till 24 March. At the auditions people showed extravagant enthusiasm which led to an extension in Lahore for a day; similar to Karachi, auditions were extended for two more days.

The first season of MasterChef Pakistan was won by Ammara Noman who defeated Gulnaz and Madiha in the series finale on 27 July 2014. Ammara received the series title, Rs. 5 million, and a contract for her own recipe book, while Gulnaz stood as a Runner-up and received Rs. 1 million with the series trophy. Madiha came up as 2nd runner-up and received Rs. 5 lakh and the series trophy.

== Revival ==
In 2025, Banijay Entertainment announced a partnership based with Pixel Entertainment, a Pakistani production company based in Karachi, regarding the revival of MasterChef under new management and on a different television channel.

After filming on a lavish set at Kenneyz Media City in Karachi, the first episode of Masterchef Pakistan Season 2 aired on HUM TV on 31 October 2025, with further episodes following every Friday at 9pm, leading to the exciting finale. The new season is being judged by chefs Saadat Siddiqi, Mahwish Aziz and Asad Monga.

== Accolade ==
MasterChef Pakistan became the first ever Pakistani reality show to be nominated for an international accolade. It was nominated as a "Best Adaptation of an Existing Format" in the Program Category section for the 19th Asian Television Awards.

| Date of ceremony | Award | Category | Recipient(s) | Result |
|---|---|---|---|---|
| 11 December 2014 | Asian Television Awards | Best Adaptation of an Existing Format | Alliance Media FZ-LLC | Highly Commended |

== Further read ==
- "7 Reasons You Should Watch MasterChef Pakistan". brandsynario. Ghazala Sulaiman.
- Ahmer Naqvi. "Adding the desi tarka to MasterChef". DAWN.com.
- "MasterChef sizzles hot with foody drama". DAWN.com. Ahmer Naqvi. 2 June 2014.
