= Sikandar Sultan =

Pakistani entrepreneur and philanthropist

Muhammad Sikandar Sultan
- Education: St. Patrick's College (Karachi), Institute of Business Administration, Karachi
- Occupations: Founder & Chairman; Shan Foods Limited
- Years active: 1981–present
- Known for: Founding the leading spice company in Pakistan
- Board member of: Shan Foods Ltd.
- Children: 3
- Awards: Marketing Association of Pakistan's Guru Award

Muhammad Sikandar Sultan (born 1955) is a Pakistani entrepreneur and philanthropist who is the founder and now Chairman of Shan Food Industries.

In 1981, Sultan was the first person to recognize and take advantage of the potential of launching an independent company that produced hygienic, first-rate packaged recipe mixes and plain spices. During this period, he took the traditional Pakistani national heritage of spice mixes and developed it into a food enterprise. By 2014, according to The Economic Times of India, "Sultan is considered the guru of Pakistan's packaged food industry."

Sikandar Sultan identified a gap in the food industry of Pakistan, where ready-made spice mixes were unheard of and selling loose spices was the norm. He took Pakistan's cultural heritage of spice mixes to create Shan Foods. From thereon, he led Shan Foods to become the second largest packaged spice mixes and packaged food products company in Pakistan, ranked only behind National Foods Limited.

In 2020, he was elected as a council member of the Marketing Association of Pakistan.
