= Ammara Noman =

Pakistani chef (born 1981)

- Born: Ammara Noman; 1981 (age 44–45); Peshawar, Khyber Pakhtunkhwa, Pakistan
- Education: Secondary Education
- Occupation: Professional chef
- Years active: 2014-present
- Spouse: Noman Sheikh
- Culinary career
- Cooking style: Pakistani cuisine, Asian cuisine
- Award
- 2014 MasterChef Pakistan

Ammara Noman (Urdu: عمارہ نعمان) is a Pakistani chef who rose to prominence after winning the title of first MasterChef Pakistan. She beat about 100 contestants and her 15 co-contestants who entered the Masterchef Kitchen.

== Personal info ==
Ammara Noman was born to Muslim parents in 1981 in peshawar, khyber pakhtunkhwa, Pakistan. She is married to Noman sheikh, couple have four children.

== MasterChef Pakistan: 2014 ==
Despite having no formal culinary training, Ammara is a self-taught cook who has cited international editions of MasterChef as an influence. She has stated that watching the programme allowed her to imagine herself cooking in the MasterChef kitchen at her own station.

She auditioned in Karachi and was selected after presenting her cold dish in Live cooking challenge. Subsequently, passing Boot Camp challenges, she appears as a 'Top 16'. In the 25 episodes where she competed in first series, Ammara was the first person who won Immunity and won eight times in individual and team challenges; additionally, she placed six times in the top three group. Ammara was the only contestant who never faced any elimination challenge: Either she won the challenge or simply got selected for next stage.

On July 27, 2014, Ammara was announced the winner of the competition and took away PKR 5,000,000, (US $ 50,000) the MasterChef title, the MasterChef trophy, and a cookbook deal, including five years free supply of Ariel. Ammara will soon publish her cookbook.
