= SCIP =

SCIP may refer to:

== Science and technology ==
- SCIP (optimization software), an optimization software for mixed-integer programs
- SCIP database, listing potentially hazardous waste and maintained by the European Chemicals Agency
- Secure Communications Interoperability Protocol, a cryptographic communication standard
- Surgical Care Improvement Project, a medical program in the US
- Strategic Consortium of Intelligence Professionals (SCIP), a global non-profit organization

== Other uses ==
- Mataveri International Airport (ICAO airport code), on Easter Island, Chile
- Sindh Cities Improvement Program, a development program in Pakistan
