= Siraj Kassam Teli =

Pakistani businessman (1953–2020)

- Born: 17 May 1953; Karachi, Pakistan
- Died: 8 December 2020 (aged 67); Dubai, United Arab Emirates
- Occupation: Industrialist
- Title: Director of Pakistan Beverage Limited; Chairman of Businessmen Group; Former President of Karachi Chamber of Commerce and Industry (2003–2004)

Siraj Kassam Teli (17 May 1953 – 8 December 2020) was a Pakistani industrialist. He died in Dubai on 8 December 2020 of a heart attack due to COVID-19.

== Biography ==
He graduated from Government College of Commerce & Economics, Karachi, in 1974. At Gul Ahmed Textile Mills Limited and Nakshbandi Industries he spent eleven years at the start of his career.

He was the president of the Karachi Chamber of Commerce and Industry and the head of the chamber's leading group.

== Awards ==
For his outstanding contribution to the economic development of the country and, philanthropic and public work, Teli was awarded the Sitara-e-Imtiaz. He received Sitara-e-Imtiaz on 23 March 2011 from Mr. Asif Ali Zardari, President of Islamic Republic of Pakistan in recognition of his exceptional services for the promotion of Trade and Industry in Pakistan.
