= Mehboob Khan (chef) =

Pakistani chef

Mehboob Khan محبوب خان
- Born: March 1970 (age 56); Karachi, Sindh, Pakistan
- Culinary career
- Television shows
- "The Cook King" "Spice of Life" "Weekend Masala" "Zauq Zindagi" "Good Healthy Life" “Mehboob’s Kitchen”
- Website: www.chefmehboob.com

Mehboob Khan better known as Chef Mehboob is a Pakistani chef, a television personality and a cooking expert. He is known for his cooking shows Zauq Zindagi and Good Healthy Life on ARY Zauq. He is also an author of cookbook Food for Life. He served as a Judge in cooking competition MasterChef Pakistan.

== Biography ==
Khan was born in 1969 to a Pashtun descent family in Karachi. His birth name is Mehboob Mandokhel but he uses the name Khan. He completed his early education in Karachi and started his career as a Chef in 1986.

== Television shows ==
Khan appears as a chef in these shows:

Year	Cooking Show	Channel	Role
2008-2013	ذوق زندگی	ARY Zauq	Chef
2008-2012	Good Healthy Life	ARY Zauq	Cooking Expert & Chef
2008-2010	The Cooking King	ARY Zauq	Chef
2009-2010	Spice of Life	ARY Zauq	Chef
2010	Weekend Masala	Masala TV	Chef
2010-2013	National Ka Pakistan	Zaiqa TV	Chef
May 3-August 3, 2014	MasterChef Pakistan (season 1)	Urdu 1	Judge & Critic
2015-2017	‘’ دعوت محبوب’’	Abb Takk News	Chef
February 13, 2017-April 2020; May 15, 2023-Now	Mehboob's Kitchen	Masala TV	Cooking Expert & Chef
