= Karachi Chamber of Commerce & Industry =

Organization

- اتاق تجارت و صنایع کراچی
- Abbreviation: KCCI
- Formation: 1959
- Headquarters: Karachi, Pakistan
- Region served: Karachi
- president: Agha Shahab Ahmed Khan, KCCI President (2019-2020)

The Karachi Chamber of Commerce and Industry (KCCI) is the Chamber of Commerce for Karachi, Pakistan.

They aim to improve Pakistan's business environment and economic well-being, especially in Karachi. They seek to provide advocacy and opportunity to their thousands of members. KCCI issues statements to the news media, making recommendations and expressing its views over current economic and financial issues in Karachi.

== History ==
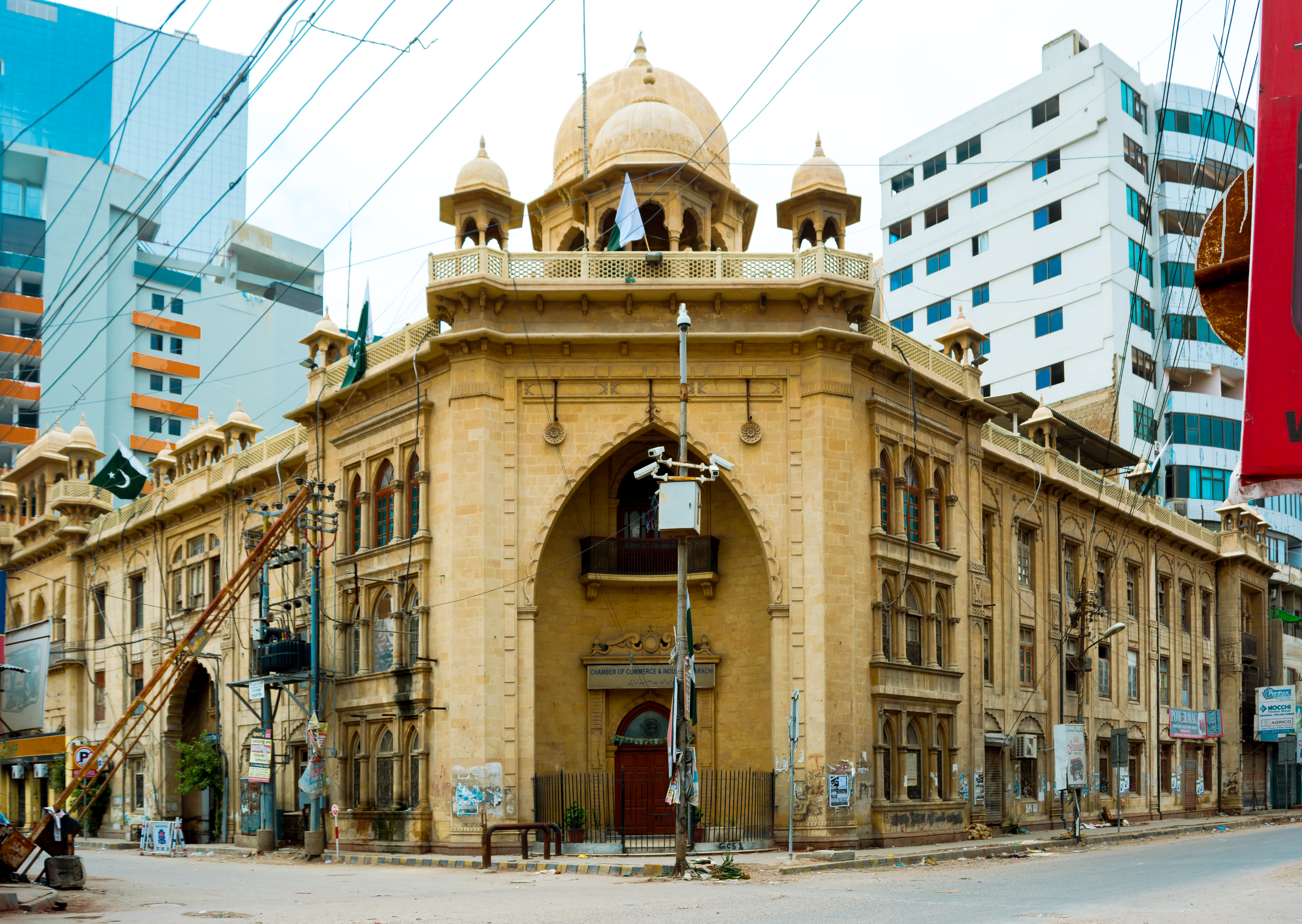
Historic Karachi Chamber of Commerce Building

The KCCI was formed in 1959 through amalgamation of four existing trade bodies, Pakistan Merchants Association, Buyers and Shippers Chamber, Chamber of Commerce Pakistan, and All Pakistan Chamber of Commerce & Industry. It was officially registered under the Trade Organization Ordinance in 1961.

== Composition ==
The Chamber is affiliated with the Federation of Pakistan Chamber of Commerce & Industry.

It has two classes of membership: Members, and Town Associations. As of 2019 the Chamber had approximately 17,000 direct members, both industrialists and traders. Seven Industrial Town Associations affiliated with the chamber, S.I.T.E. Association of Industry, Landhi Association of Trade & Industry, Korangi Association of Trade & Industry, Federal 'B' Area Association of Trade & Industry, North Karachi Association of Trade & Industry, S.I.T.E. Superhighway Association of Industry, and Bin Qasim Association of Trade & Industry.

The Chamber's effective membership comes to around 50,000. Due to its location in the commercial, financial and industrial center that is Karachi, it represents mainstream economic activities. Karachi is the largest city in Pakistan. KCCI is the nation's largest business Chamber and is the eighth largest business elective representative body in the world as measured by its membership base.

== Management ==
Policies and programs are determined by the 30 member Managing Committee who are elected by the organization's General Body. Tee Korner Committee members retire every year. Two seats are reserved for Women Entrepreneurs with one seat each for representatives/nominations from affiliated industrial town associations. The President is elected by the General Body and the Senior Vice President and the vice-president are elected annually by the Managing Committee.The president controls office staff and directs all matters of the Chamber with assistance of the Senior Vice-president and the vice-president.

== Presidents ==
- M.A. Rangoonwala, 1959 (Chairman Ad'hoc re-organizing Committee for Formation, Chamber of Commerce & Industry, Karachi)
- JP Sheikh Abdul Khaliq Abdul Razak, 1959–1960 (Baba-e-Biradari and founder Jamiyat Punjabi Saudagran-e-Delhi)
- Mohammad Hanif, 1960–1961
- A.K. Sumar, 1961–1963
- M.A. Jawad, 1964–1965
- Mohammad Shafique, 1965–1966
- M.A. Enam Elahi, 1966–1967
- P.G. Allana, 1967–1968
- Yusuf H. Shirazi, 1968–1970
- Ahmed Abdullah, 1970–1971
- Abdur Rehman Haji Habib, 1971–1972
- Kasam Usman Kandawala, 1972–1974
- G.R. Arshad, 1974–1976
- Mohammad Adil, 1976–1978
- Abdul Majeed Suleman Bawany, 1978–1979
- Abdul Jabbar Khamisani, 1978–1979
- Mohammad Muslim, 1979–1980
- Shoukat Ahmed, 1980–1981
- Haji Razak Janoo, 1981–1983
- Jawed Sultan Japanwala, 1983–1984
- Tariq Sayeed, 1984–1985
- Abdul Karim Rajkotwala, 1985–1986
- Aftab Khalili, 1986–1987
- Qaiser Ahmed Sheikh, 1987–1988
- Mohammad Yunus Bandukda, 1988–1989
- Khawaja Qutubuddin, 1989–1990
- Riaz Ahmed Tata, 1990–1991
- Abdul Aziz Haji Yaqoob, 1991–1992
- Tahir Khaliq, 1992–1993
- Haroon Rashid, 1993–1994
- Ahmed A. Sattar, 1994–1995
- Haji Shafiq-ur-Rehman, 1995–1996
- Mian Shahzada Alam, 1996–1997
- Mohammad Hanif Janoo, 1997–1998
- Abdullah Ismail, 1998–1999
- Mamnoon Hussain, 1998–1999
- Javed Muslim, 1998–1999
- Amjad Rafi, 1999–2000
- Muhammad Zubair Motiwala, 2000–2001
- A.Q. Khalil, 2001–2002
- Maqbool A. Shaikh, 2001–2002
- M. Haroon Bari, 2001–2002
- Shaukat Iqbal, 2002–2003
- Mian Nasser Hyatt Maggo, 2002–2003
- Siraj Kassam Teli, 2003–2004
- Khalid Firoz, 2004–2005
- Haroon Farooki, 2005–2006
- Majyd Aziz, 2006–2007
- Shamim Ahmed Shamsi, 2007–2008
- Anjum Nisar, 2008–2010
- Abdul Majid Haji Muhammad, 2009–10
- Muhammad Saeed Shafique, 2010–11
- Mian Abrar Ahmed, 2011–12
- Muhammad Haroon Agar, 2012-2013
- Abdullah Zaki, 2013-2014
- Iftikhar Ahmed Vohra, 2014-2015
- Younus Muhammad Bashir, 2015-2016
- Shamim Ahmed Firpo, 2016-2017
- Muffasar Atta Malik, 2017-2018

== Research and development ==
The Karachi Chamber of Commerce has a Research and Economic Development Department.

Dr. Syed Mehboob produced several research reports and made the base KCCI's research department. He built a large based DATA BANK at KCCI. The department is headed by Uzma Tasleem. The Research & Development Cell was redefined by Mr. Siraj Kassam Teli during 2012–13.

== See also ==
- Federation of Pakistan Chambers of Commerce & Industry
- Economy of Karachi
- Economy of Pakistan
- Karachi
