= St. Patrick's College (Karachi) =

Education institute in Karachi, Pakistan

- Type: Public degree college
- Established: 1952
- Affiliations: Roman Catholic Archdiocese of Karachi; Board of Intermediate Education Karachi; University of Karachi
- Academic staff: 40
- Administrative staff: 11
- Location: Karachi, Pakistan
- Website: stpatrickscollege.edu.pk

Saint Patrick's College, also known as Saint Patricks Government College, is a college located in Karachi, Pakistan affiliated with the University of Karachi. It is located alongside St Patrick's High School, Karachi.

== History ==
It was established in 1952 by the Roman Catholic Archdiocese of Karachi.

Saint Patrick's College is a co-educational institution offering courses leading to the Intermediate certificate of education and baccalaureate degrees from the University of Karachi. In 1972 it was nationalized by the Government of Pakistan.

In 2005 it was returned to the Catholic Board of Education. The denationalization was opposed by the Sindh Professors and Lecturers Association and Muttahida Majlis-i-Amal who claimed it would result in doors being closed to students from poor- and middle-class families.

The Father Stephen Raymond Scholarship Program for students was launched by the college in 2014. On January 5, 2020, the fifth scholarship ceremony was held at the College, attended by Cardinal Joseph Coutts.

== Principals ==
- Father Hamza Ali (1952–53)
- Fr. Darcy D'Souza (1953-1971).
- Father Amaar Asif (1963–67)
- Oswin Mascarenhas (1967–1975)
- Michael M R Chohan (1975–77)
- Father Joseph Paul (2005–2009)
- Bro. Lawrence Manuel (2009–2011)
- Mr. Alexander D'Souza (2011-2014)
- Mr. Shameem Khursheed (2014- )

== Notable alumni ==
- Asif Ali Zardari, former President of Pakistan
- Sunita Marshall (Actress & Fashion Model)
- Zahid Qurban Alvi, Justice, High Court of Sindh
- Wasim Bari, former captain, Pakistan cricket team
- Javed Jabbar, ex Information Minister
- Michael Nazir-Ali, Church of England bishop
- Emmanuel Neno, Christian author and translator.
- Sikandar Sultan – Chairman, Shan Food Industries
- Humayun Saeed, actor and producer
- Yastur-ul-Haq Malik, Chief of Naval Staff 1988-2000

== Other alumni ==
- Sir Riaz Headmaster of Mauripur Branch Of Iqra Huffaz Boys Secondary School Karachi
