= Aisha Bawany Academy =

Aisha Bawany Academy عائشہ باوانی جامعہ
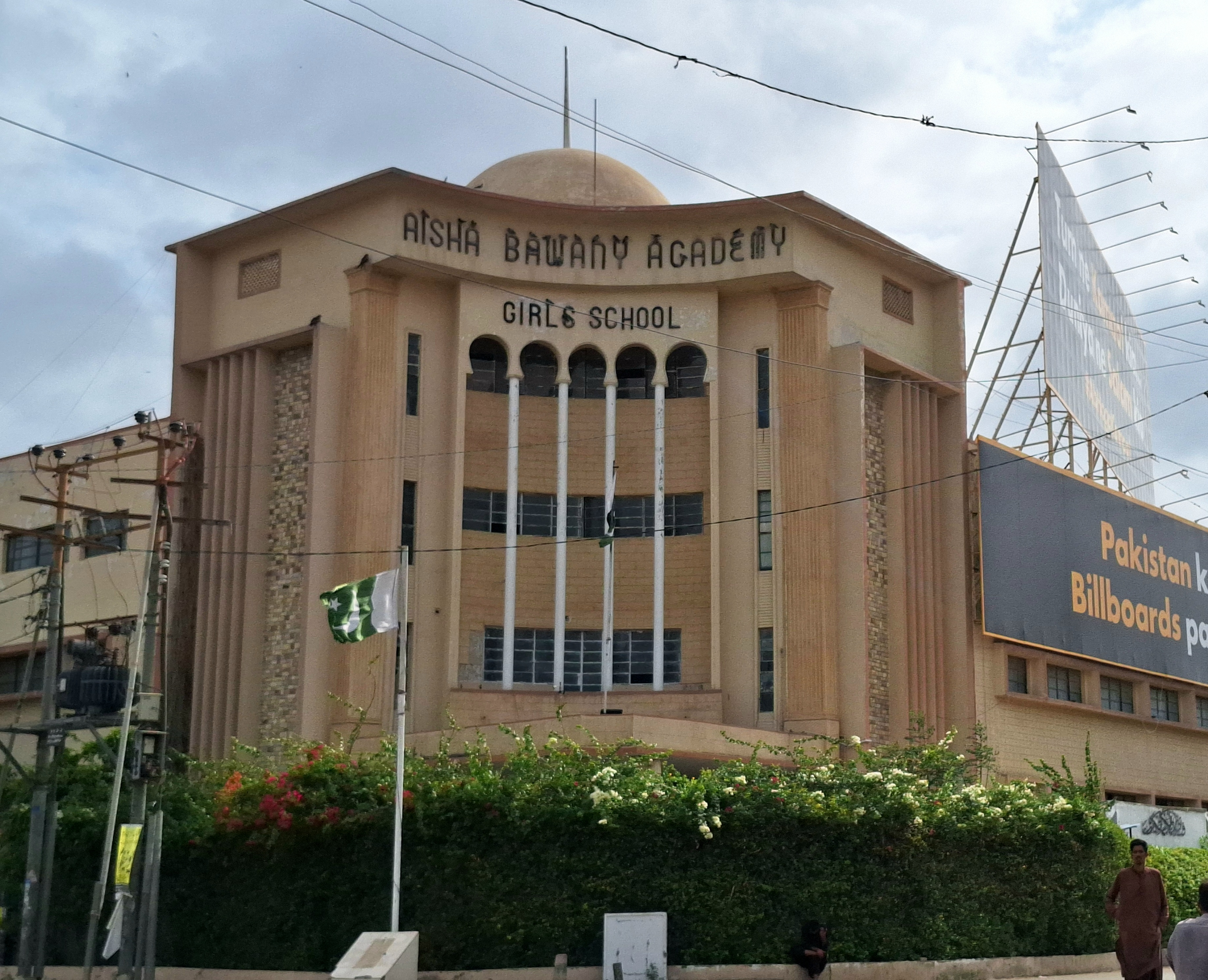
- Aisha Bawany School Building in Karachi

Location
- Karachi; Pakistan; 24°51′25.11″N 67°2′50.21″E

Information
- Type: Waqf
- Established: 1983
- Founder: Ebrahim Ahmed Bawany
- Website: http://www.aishabawany.edu.pk/

Aisha Bawany Academy is a school located in Karachi, Sindh, Pakistan. Aisha Bawany Academy offers education levels Montessori, Kindergarten, O Level, and Matric.

Aisha Bawany Academy has separate schools for males and female students. Aisha Bawany uses International English Language Testing System (IELTS) for their graduating students.

The academy was established by the Begum Aisha Bawany Waqf, founded in memory of the late Begum Aisha Bawany by her heirs. The foundation stone of the Aisha Bawany Academy was laid on October 29, 1957, and the school became operational in July 1961.
