= British Council, Karachi =

British cultural institute in Karachi, Pakistan

- Founded: 1948
- Type: Cultural Institution, Language Learning Center
- Location: Karachi, Sindh, Pakistan
- Region served: Sindh and Balochistan
- Website: British Council

The British Council, Karachi is located in Karachi, Sindh, Pakistan.

The British Council is a United Kingdom–based organisation specialising in international educational and cultural relations. It aims to build connections, understanding, and trust between people in the United Kingdom and other countries through arts and culture, education, and the English language. The organisation is registered as a charity in both England and Wales and Scotland.

Founded in 1934 as the British Committee for Relations with Other Countries, the British Council was granted a royal charter by King George VI in 1940. Its establishment was influenced by Sir Reginald (Rex) Leeper's emphasis on the role of "cultural propaganda" advancing British interests. While its "sponsoring department" within the United Kingdom Government is the Foreign and Commonwealth Office, the British Council operates with day-to-day independence.

In Pakistan, the British Council has been active since 1948, working in the fields of arts, education, and the English language across all four provinces, as well as in Azad Kashmir, Gilgit-Baltistan and the former Federally Administered Tribal Areas (FATA) through offices in Karachi, Lahore and Islamabad.

== See also ==
- Alliance Française
- Goethe-Institut, Karachi
- Alliance Française de Karachi
