= Sindh Cities Improvement Program =

The Sindh Cities Improvement Program (SCIP) is a program initiated by the Government of Sindh with the assistance of the Asian Development Bank (ADB), with the aim of improving municipal services and development of major urban centers of Sindh, Pakistan. The first phase of the program was implemented in selected towns in upper Sindh, known as the Sukkur cluster, and focused on improving water, sanitation and solid waste management services, thereby improving public health and quality of life.

The SCIP Program Support Unit (PSU) is located in the Clifton district of Karachi.
