= National Foods Limited =

Pakistani food company

- Type: Public
- Traded as: PSX: NATF; KSE 100 component
- Industry: Packaged food products Spices
- Founded: 1970 in Karachi, Pakistan
- Headquarters: Karachi, Pakistan
- Area served: Worldwide
- Key people: Zahid Majeed (Chairman); Abrar Hasan (CEO)
- Revenue: ▲ Rs. 29.60 billion (US$110 million) (2023)
- Operating income: ▲ Rs. 2.70 billion (US$9.7 million) (2023)
- Net income: ▲ Rs. 2.18 billion (US$7.8 million) (2023)
- Total assets: ▲ Rs. 25.15 billion (US$90 million) (2023)
- Total equity: ▲ Rs. 7.524 billion (US$27 million)
- Number of employees: 808 (2023)
- Website: nfoods.com
- Footnotes; Financials as of 30 June 2023

National Foods Limited is a Pakistani multinational food products company founded in 1970, that manufactures, markets, and distributes spices, seasoning mixes, condiments, and other flavoring products to retail outlets, food manufacturers, and food service businesses. It is a major food products company in Pakistan.

== History ==
National Foods was incorporated in Pakistan on 19 February 1970 as a private limited company and subsequently converted into a public limited company under the Companies Ordinance, 1984 by a special resolution passed in the extraordinary general meeting held on March 30, 1988. The company is principally engaged in the manufacture and sale of convenience-based food products. The registered office of the company is situated at 12 / CL - 6, Claremont Road, Civil Lines, Karachi.

In 1988, National Foods became the certified vendor of McCormick, United States. In the same year, National Foods, then a Private Limited company was converted into a Public Limited company, traded on all the three stock exchanges of Pakistan.

In 2013, as a company National Foods Limited (Pakistan) was listed on the Forbes List of Asia's 200 Best Under A Billion (2013).

In 2017, National Foods Limited acquired a controlling interest in Canadian company A1 Cash & Carry to further expand its operations across the globe. A1 Cash & Carry is a wholesale distributor of foodservice products, disposables, and sanitation/janitorial products in Canada. This company is partially owned by a Canadian-based Pakistani businessman Amjad Pervaiz.

With a range of over 250 food products in over 10 major categories, National Foods is one of the prominent food companies in Pakistan.

National Foods' reach extends to 40 countries across five continents. The company has subsidiaries in the UAE, UK, North America, and a supply chain hub in Canada.

== Subsidiaries ==
- National Foods DMCC (Dubai)
- National Foods Pakistan (UK) Limited
- National Epicure Inc, (Canada)

== Products ==
- Spices, pickles, tomato ketchup, jams, jellies, sauces, cooking pastes, fruit juices, fruit drinks
- Biryanis, curries, barbeque items and kababs (ready-to-eat-meals)

== Factories ==
The company operates factories in Karachi, Nooriabad and Faisalabad

In 2024, National Foods Limited inaugurated their largest plant in Faisalabad, Pakistan. The plant signifies company's 7 billion Pakistani rupees invested in the food sector.

== See also ==
- Shan Foods
