= Zakir Qureshi =

Pakistani television chef (1967–2025)

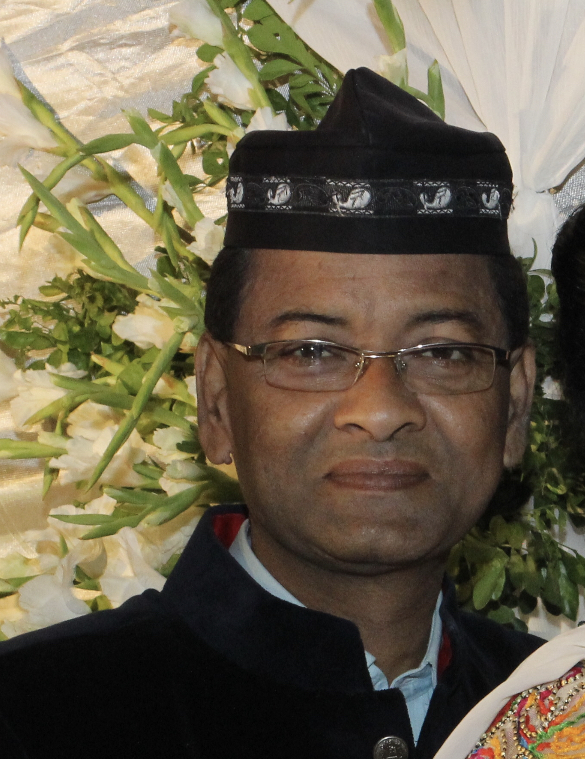
- Qureshi in 2015
- Born: 16 February 1967; Karachi, West Pakistan, Pakistan
- Died: 21 April 2025 (aged 58); Karachi, Sindh, Pakistan
- Education: Allama Iqbal College
- Occupations: Chef, television host, hotelier
- Spouse: Naseera Zakir
- Culinary career
- Cooking style: Pakistani Cuisine, Asian cuisine, South African cuisine
- Current restaurant: CZ Restaurant
- Television shows: Dawat by Chef Zakir on Masala TV; Chef Zakir live on Hum TV; Indus TV; Zakir’s Kitchen by Chef Zakir on Dawn news
- Website: chefzakir.pk

Muhammad Zakir Qureshi (Urdu: ذاکر قریشی; 16 February 1967 – 21 April 2025), better known as Chef Zakir, was a Pakistani television chef, host, hotelier and food personality who appeared on cooking programmes on Hum TV and Masala TV. He was an expert on Pakistani cuisine as well as international cuisine.

== Life and career ==
Qureshi was born as Muhammad Zakir Qureshi in Karachi, Pakistan in 1967. He travelled to work and study in Dubai, Singapore, South Africa and Botswana.

He started his professional career in 1980 at the Sheraton Hotel in Karachi. He also worked in the Avari Hotel and the Pearl Continental Hotel in Karachi.

Qureshi first appeared on Indus TV. In 2006, he worked for Hum TV. As of 2007, he hosted a show called Dawat on Masala TV. He died due to protracted kidney illness in Karachi, on 21 April 2025, at the age of 58.
