= Bin Qasim Industrial Zone =

Industrial area in Karachi, Sindh, Pakistan

The Bin Qasim Industrial Zone is one of the largest industrial areas in Karachi, Sindh, Pakistan.

It consists of more than 25,000 acres of land in the Port Qasim (Bin Qasim) area. Contained within this zone are many industrial units, ranging from medium to large in employment volume. In 2025, there are 180 Large and Medium Size units operating in the area.

The Bin Qasim Industrial Zone has the potential to emerge as a 'Financial Hub' of Karachi in the future. In 2025, there are a number of banks and insurance companies operating in the area. There are many large scale industrial companies operating in the area such as Pakistan Steel Mills, Toyota Indus Motors, Pak Suzuki Motors, Engro Polymer & Chemicals Limited, FFC Jordan, Ghandhara Nissan, National Foods Limited, Nestle Pakistan, Fauji Oil Terminals and Tripak Films Limited are the prominent industrial units in Bin Qasim Industria Zone.

== Industrial Parks in Karachi ==
- Federal B Industrial Area
- Karachi Export Processing Zone
- Korangi Creek Industrial Park
- Korangi Industrial Area
- North Karachi Industrial Area
- Pakistan Textile City
- S.I.T.E Industrial Area
- West Wharf Industrial Area
