= Bank AL Habib =

Pakistani commercial bank

Bank AL Habib Limited

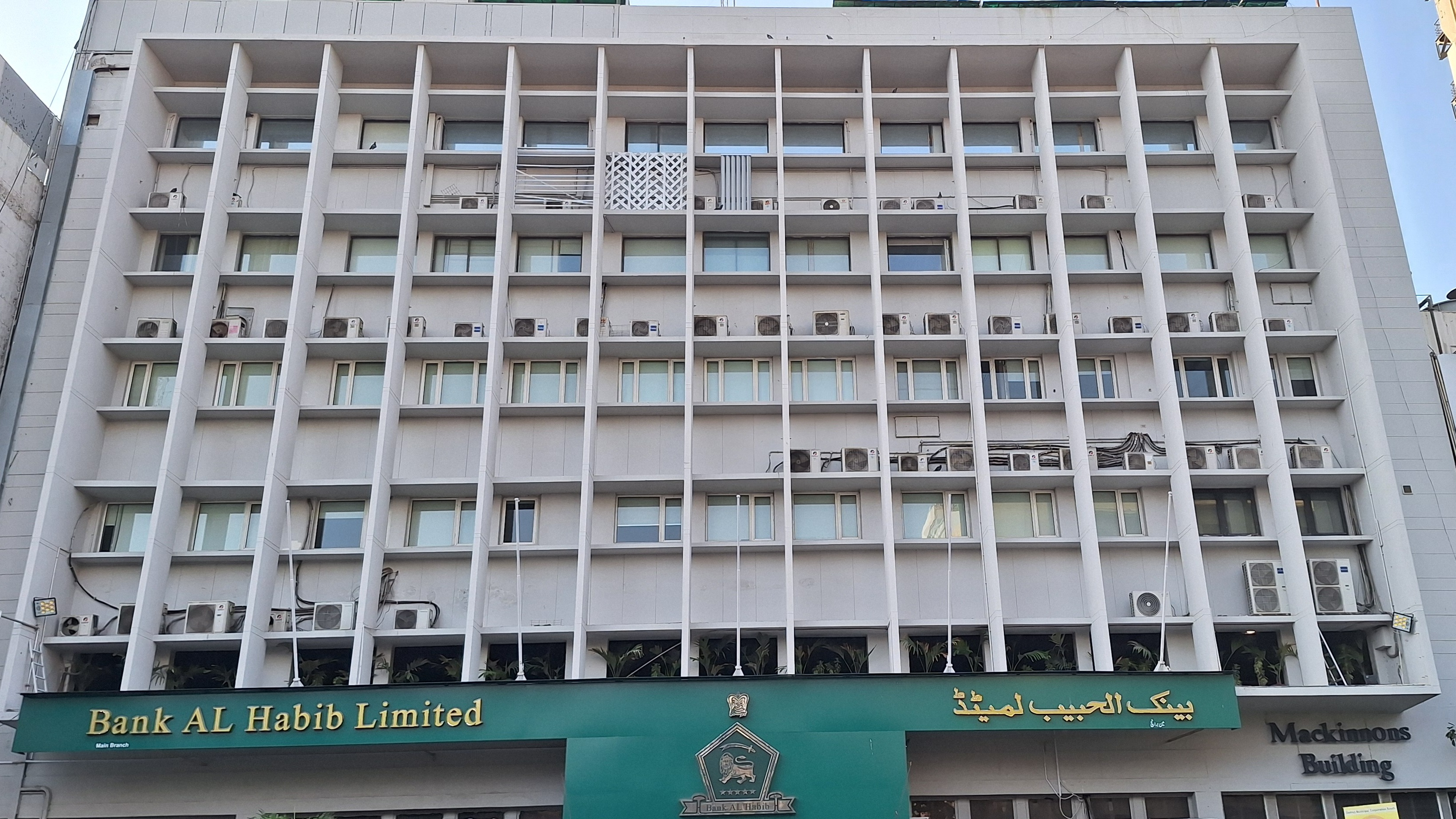
- Headquarters of Bank AL Habib on I.I. Chundrigar Road in Karachi
- Type: Public
- Traded as: PSX: BAHL; KSE 30 component
- Industry: Banking
- Founded: February 1991; 35 years ago
- Founder: Hamid D. Habib
- Headquarters: Karachi-74000, Pakistan
- Number of locations: 1,323 (2025)
- Key people: Mansoor Ali Khan (CEO); Abbas D. Habib (chairman)
- Products: Loans, credit cards, savings, consumer banking
- Revenue: ▼ Rs. 159.06 billion (US$570 million) (2025)
- Operating income: ▼ Rs. 65.51 billion (US$230 million) (2025)
- Net income: ▼ Rs. 30.63 billion (US$110 million) (2025)
- Total assets: ▼ Rs. 3.30 trillion (US$12 billion) (2025)
- Total equity: ▲ Rs. 141.75 billion (US$510 million) (2025)
- Owner: Dawood Habib family
- Number of employees: 22,863 (2025)
- Website: bankalhabib.com

Bank Al Habib Limited (Urdu pronunciation: [bɛŋk al ha.ˈbiːb] bank-al-hah-BEEB) is a Pakistani commercial bank based in Karachi. It is one of the largest banks in Pakistan with branches across the country. It also operates wholesale branches in Bahrain and Malaysia and offices in UAE, Turkey (Istanbul), China (Beijing), and Kenya.

== History ==
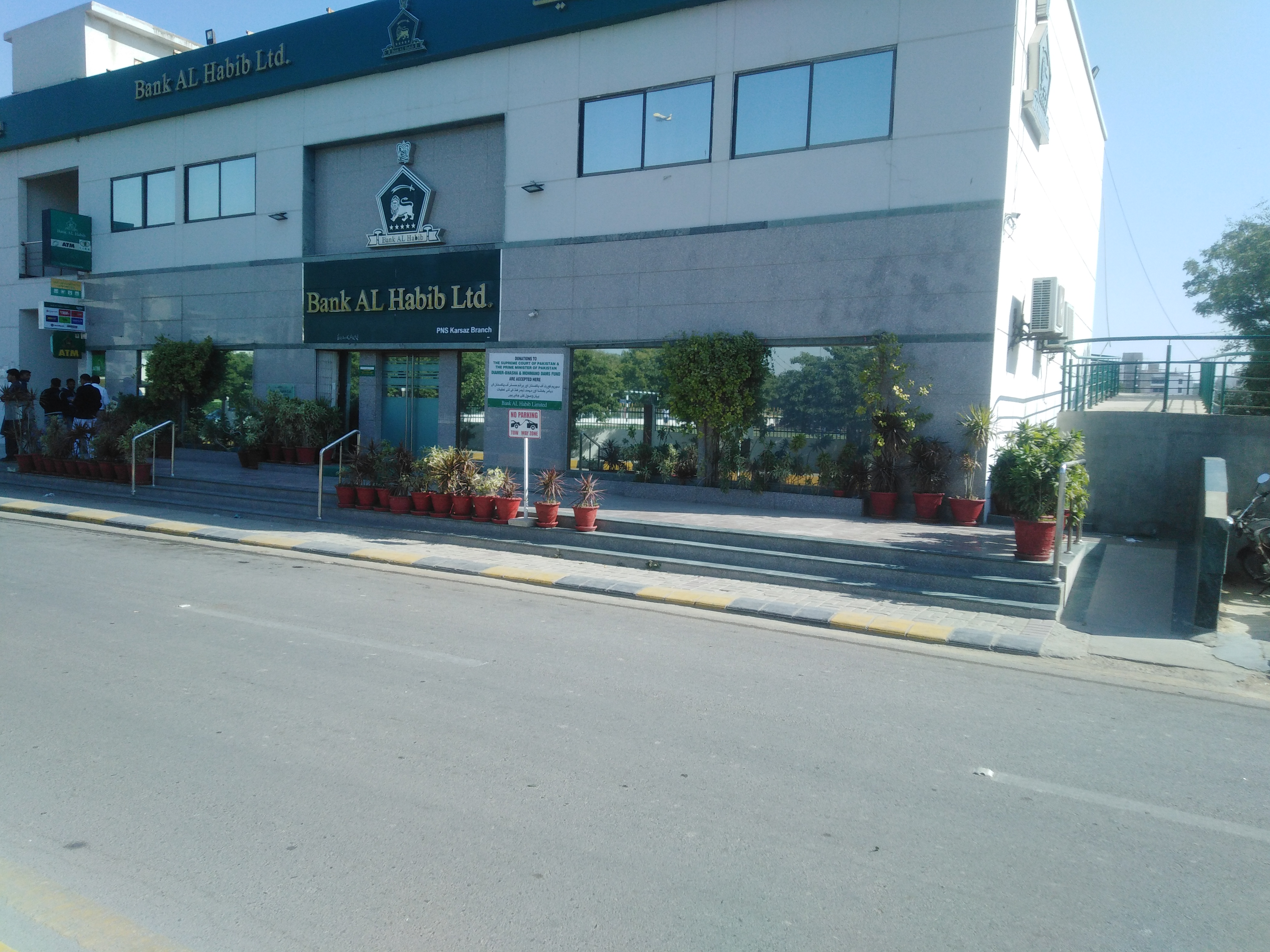
One of the Bank Al Habib's branch in Karachi

The Habib family, the bank's sponsors, had been associated with banking in the Indian subcontinent since the 1920s and were among the founders of Habib Bank Limited, which was established in Bombay in 1941 and relocated to Karachi in 1947 at the request of Muhammad Ali Jinnah. Habib Bank was nationalised along with other private banks in Pakistan on 1 January 1974. Under the subsequent privatisation policy of the Government of Pakistan in the early 1990s, the Dawood Habib family was granted permission to set up a private bank. Bank AL Habib was incorporated as a public limited company on 15 October 1991 and commenced banking operations in 1992, beginning with shareholders' funds of PKR 300 million and six branches. Hamid D. Habib, formerly a director and later chairman of Habib Bank Limited, was appointed as the first chairman, while Rashid D. Habib, who had served as managing director of Habib Bank Limited until its nationalisation, was appointed as managing director and chief executive.

After the death of Rashid D. Habib in 1994, Abbas D. Habib, the joint managing director, was appointed as managing director and chief executive. Following the death of Hamid D. Habib in May 2000, Ali Raza D. Habib was appointed chairman.

In 2005, the bank launched internet banking services. In 2018, Bank AL Habib expanded its operations and opened a representative office in Kenya.

In 2020, Bank AL Habib purchased Centrepoint, a high-rise building in Karachi from TPL Properties. In May 2020, Bank AL Habib completed the acquisition of the remaining 70% stake in Habib Asset Management Limited, making it a wholly owned subsidiary; the company was subsequently renamed AL Habib Asset Management Limited. In March 2024, following State Bank of Pakistan approval, the bank launched a wholly owned subsidiary, AL Habib Exchange Company (Private) Limited, with a declared share capital of PKR 1 billion, as part of regulatory reforms aimed at restructuring Pakistan's foreign exchange market.

== Subsidiaries ==
- AL Habib Capital Markets
- AL Habib Exchange Company Pvt LTD
