= Industrial parks in Karachi =

The industrial parks in Karachi are areas developed specifically for exclusively industrial activity in Karachi, Sindh, Pakistan. The industrial parks manufacture consumer and industrial goods, creating jobs for the local population.

An industrial park (also known as industrial estate, trading estate) is an area zoned and planned for the purpose of industrial development. An industrial park can be thought of as a more "heavyweight" version of a business park or office park, which has offices and light industry, rather than heavy industry. Industrial parks are usually located on the edges of, or outside of, the main residential area of a city, and are normally provided with good transportation access, including road and rail.

The National Industrial Parks Development and Management Company (NIP) and Sci Life Pharma signed a licence agreement that authorises the latter to start the construction of a manufacturing plant – considered to be its flagship project – in the Korangi Creek Industrial Park (KCIP).

== Industrial parks in Karachi ==
- Bin Qasim Industrial Zone
- Federal B Industrial Area
- Karachi Export Processing Zone
- Korangi Creek Industrial Park
- Korangi Industrial Area
- North Karachi Industrial Area
- Pakistan Textile City
- S.I.T.E Industrial Area
- West Wharf Industrial Area
