= North Karachi Industrial Area =

Place in Pakistan

North Karachi Industrial Area is located in Karachi, Sindh, Pakistan. NKATI stands for North Karachi Association of Trade and Industry which is a registered Trade Body representing more than 2000 commercial, industrial and service units located in North Karachi Industrial Area (NKIA).

It came into existence in 1974. Initially, there were plots of poultry farms which were converted into industrial plots that is why the network of the roads of NKIA basically comprises small streets as well as connected roads. It is scattered and spread over an area of 725 acres.

The association is an initiative by the industrialists in the area who have seen their concerns neglected by the appointed government officials. One of the main problems that the industrialists have had to face in their area is the neglect of proper infrastructure development.

Since 2007, the role of the association has become more prominent as the existing associations are now being governed by the Director General, Ministry of Commerce, Pakistan; under the new Trade Organizations Ordinance 2007.

The association plays an integral part in the role in assisting the Government on both the Federal and Provisional level. It is an initiative that when properly utilized serves to advance international trade and development.

More than 2500 industries operate under the umbrella of NKATI and the majority of them are exporters who bring in the much needed foreign exchange as a contribution to the National Economy.

The significant contributions to the National Economy have been estimated at:

- Income Tax about Rs.3.5 Billion per annum.
- Duties and taxes about Rs. 5.5 Billion per annum.
- Total taxes about Rs 9 Billion per annum.

The association provides a platform for the many SME's in the area to voice their concerns regarding the basic necessities required to run profitable businesses. Many of these concerns are infrastructure related and highlight the proper usage of government taxation in an area which is a lucrative source of foreign exchange. The association serves as an example of an attempt at public-private partnership to improve both the profitability of business and in turn provide a significant contribution to the national economy. The association also serves as an example of a circumstance where public failure is evident and private businesses have had to step in and take action to prevent a major loss to the multitude of people whose livelihood is dependent on a thriving and flourishing industrial area.

The structure of management at North Karachi Industrial Association includes Chairmen, Managing Committee, Standing Committee/Sub Committee.

== Industrial Parks ==
- Bin Qasim Industrial Zone
- Federal B Industrial Area
- Karachi Export Processing Zone
- Korangi Creek Industrial Park
- Korangi Industrial Area
- Pakistan Textile City
- S.I.T.E Industrial Area
- West Wharf Industrial Area
