= Ariel (detergent) =

European laundry detergent brand

- Product type: Laundry detergent
- Current owner: Procter & Gamble
- Country: Belgium, Europe
- Introduced: 1967; 59 years ago
- Markets: Worldwide
- Website: www.ariel.co.uk

Ariel is a European and worldwide brand of laundry detergent owned by Procter & Gamble and developed by the European Technology Centre in Belgium. The enzymes for the detergent are provided by Novozymes.

== History ==
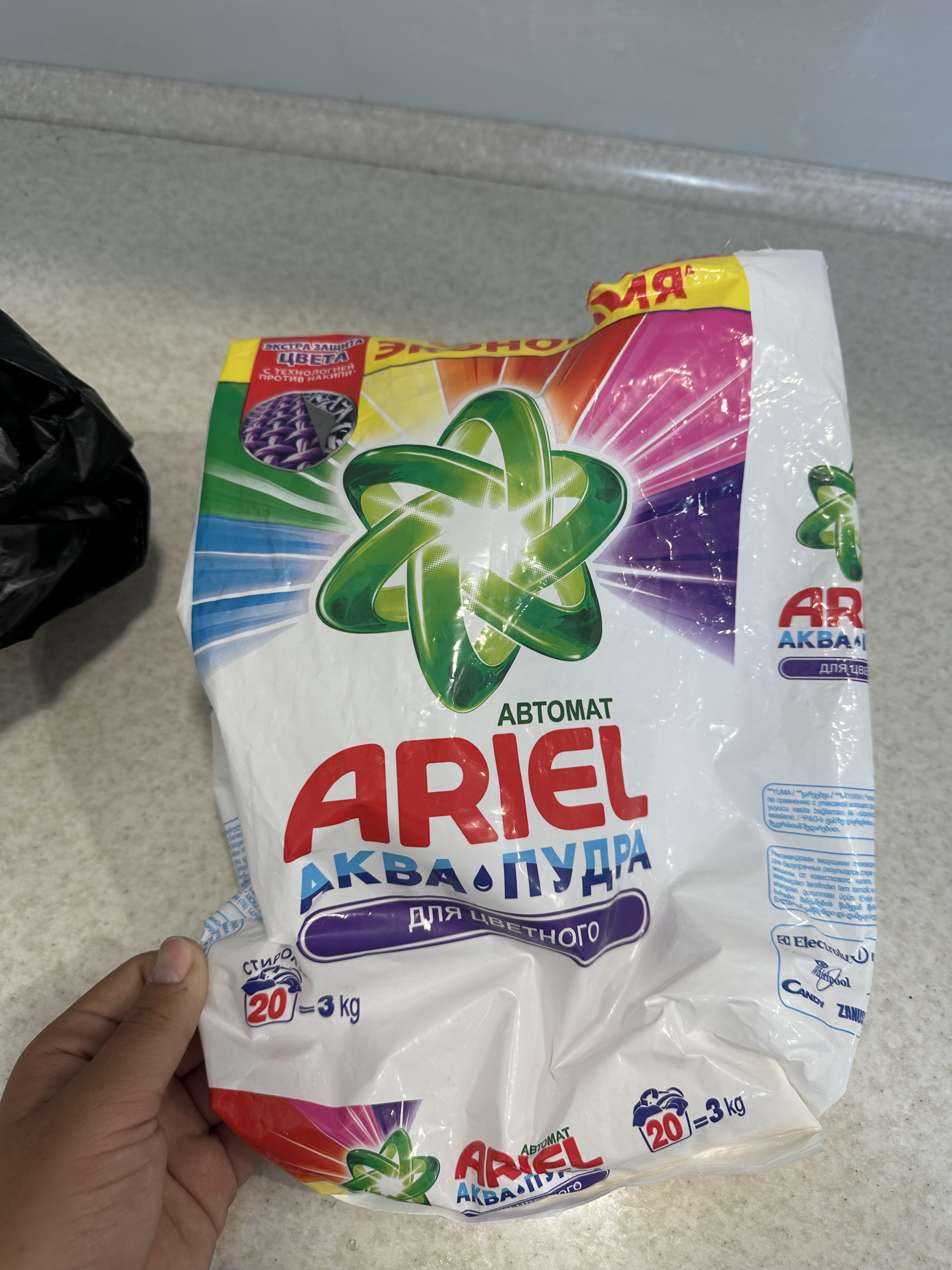
A bag of Ariel detergent as sold in Uzbekistan

It was launched in multiple markets from 1967 to 1969. The brand is owned by American multinational company Procter & Gamble and popular in Mexico, India, and the Philippines.
