= Pakistan Textile City =

Industrial zone in Karachi

The Pakistan Textile City, situated in Karachi, Sindh, is an industrial zone dedicated to textile processing and related industries. Established in 2009, it spans 1,250 acres, and is strategically located within the North Western Industrial Zone of Port Qasim, just 6 km from the N-5 National Highway.

The Federal Government of Pakistan has a 40% share in the textile city whereas the Sindh Government has 16% shareholding. National Bank of Pakistan (NBP) has 8% stake, the Export Processing Zone 4%, Saudi Pak Insurance Company 4%, National Investment Bank 4%, Pak Kuwait Investment Company 4%, Pak Qatar Investment Company 4% and PIDC 1%.

Currently, the Pakistan Textile City project is on the verge of collapse, incurring huge loss to the national exchequer as the government is paying about Rs.400 million as interest on bank loans per year. Due to mismanagement and corruption the debt of textile city is exceeding Rs.2.4 billion.

== Other Industrial Parks in Karachi ==
- Bin Qasim Industrial Zone
- Federal B Industrial Area
- Karachi Export Processing Zone
- Korangi Creek Industrial Park
- Korangi Industrial Area
- North Karachi Industrial Area
- S.I.T.E Industrial Area
- West Wharf Industrial Area
