= Shan Foods =

Pakistani food product company

Shan foods
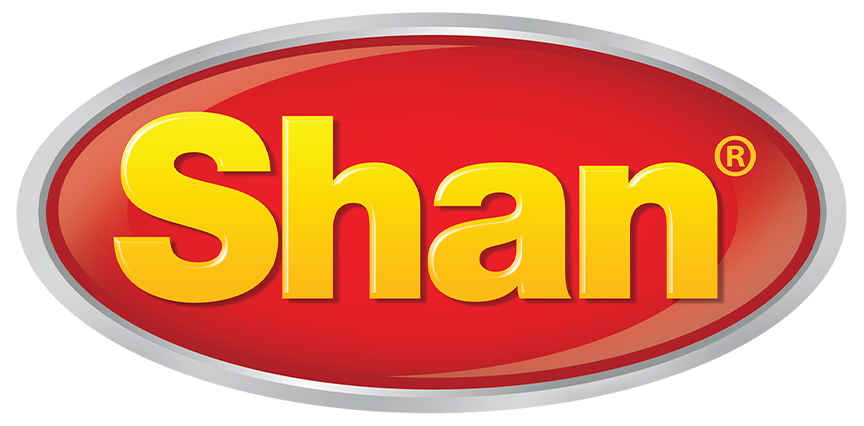
- Native name: غذاهای شان
- Type: Private
- Industry: Food processing Packaged spice mixes
- Founded: 1981 in Karachi, Pakistan
- Founder: Sikandar Sultan
- Area served: Worldwide
- Brands: Shoop Noodles
- Revenue: ▲ Rs. 25 billion (US$89 million) (2023)
- Website: www.shanfoods.com

Shan Foods is a Pakistani producer of packaged spice mixes, primarily used in Pakistani dishes. The privately held company was established in 1981 as a single-room operation by its founder, Sikandar Sultan.

The company's products include recipe mixes, plain spices, ready-to-cook sauces, cooking pastes, dessert mixes, cooking condiments, accompaniments, and instant noodles.

== History ==
Shan Foods was founded in 1981, as a cottage industry operation, operating out of the home of the company's founder Sikander Sultan. He, along with his wife, started making spice mixes at their home, which started selling in Pakistan and with Pakistanis who had moved to the neighbouring Arab countries, Europe, United States and Canada.

== Controversies ==
In July 2023, the German media reported a ban on some products on the German market by this company due to the alleged presence of Ethylene oxide, a fumigant and pesticide, which is known to pose serious health hazards as a carcinogen and is banned from food production in Europe. The news was shared by Pakistani politician Khurram Shehzad on his Twitter account which caused a backlash against the company by the general public in Pakistan. In response to this, Ideal Foods Traders GmBH, a German retailer of Asian food products issued a statement to clarify that only specific batches of 12 products from Shan Foods were recalled from the market. Although initially unresponsive to questions from the media, the company officially rejected these claims on its Twitter account as "incorrect and misleading", claiming that its products were safe for consumption and met health and safety standards.
