= Paposh Nagar Graveyard =

Cemetery in Karachi

- پاپوش نگر قبرستان
- Interactive map of Paposh Nagar Graveyard

Details
- Abandoned: February 2017
- Location: Paposh Nagar, Karachi
- Country: Pakistan
- Coordinates: 24.928136°N 67.022344°E
- Owned by: Karachi Metropolitan Corporation

Paposh Nagar Graveyard is one of the oldest graveyards located in Paposh Nagar, Karachi, Pakistan.

In 2011, the cemetery drew attention as the site of a criminal case.

In February 2017, the Karachi Metropolitan Corporation banned burial in Paposh Nagar Graveyard due to a lack of availabile space. But despite the ban, people are illegally burying corpses.

== Necrophilia case (2011) ==
Click to show details of the 2011 necrophilia case

In October 2011, a graveyard caretaker, Mohammad Riaz, was arrested at the Paposh Nagar graveyard in Karachi after being caught sexually assaulting a recently buried corpse.

During interrogation, Riaz confessed to repeatedly defiling the bodies of women over a period of roughly eight years while working as a groundskeeper responsible for watering plants and maintaining the graves. Local reports cited approximately 48 victims.

Riaz claimed that he was introduced to the job by another gravedigger named Wazir, who had died two years earlier, though this statement was never independently verified by authorities.

Following his confession, Riaz was charged under various sections of the Pakistan Penal Code, including offences against burial places and sexual assault. The case gained national and international media attention and sparked public debate about the lack of specific legal provisions addressing necrophilia in Pakistan.

== Notable burials ==
- Ibn-e-Safi (1928–1980), fiction writer, novelist and poet of Urdu
- Mulla Wahidi (1888–1976), writer and journalist
- Ibn-e-Insha (1927–1978), writer
- Mohsin Bhopali (1932–2007), poet
- Mufti Rashid Ahmad Ludhianvi (1922–2002), Islamic scholar
- Dr. Mohammad Ali Shah (1946–2013), orthopaedic surgeon
- Ghulam Farid Sabri (1945–2011), Qawwali singer
- Maqbool Ahmed Sabri (1930–1994), Qawwali singer
- Amjad Sabri (1976–2016), Qawwali singer
- Zaheen Tahira (1949–2019), film and television actress, producer and director
- B. M. Kutty (1930–2019), journalist, public servant, politician
- Quraish Pur (1932–2013), scholar, writer, novelist, columnist and media expert
- Qasim Razwi (1902–1970), Sardar / General of Hyderabad State Razakars
