= Sabri Brothers =

Pakistani musical band

"Shahenshah-e-Qawwali" The Sabri Brothers Pride of Performance
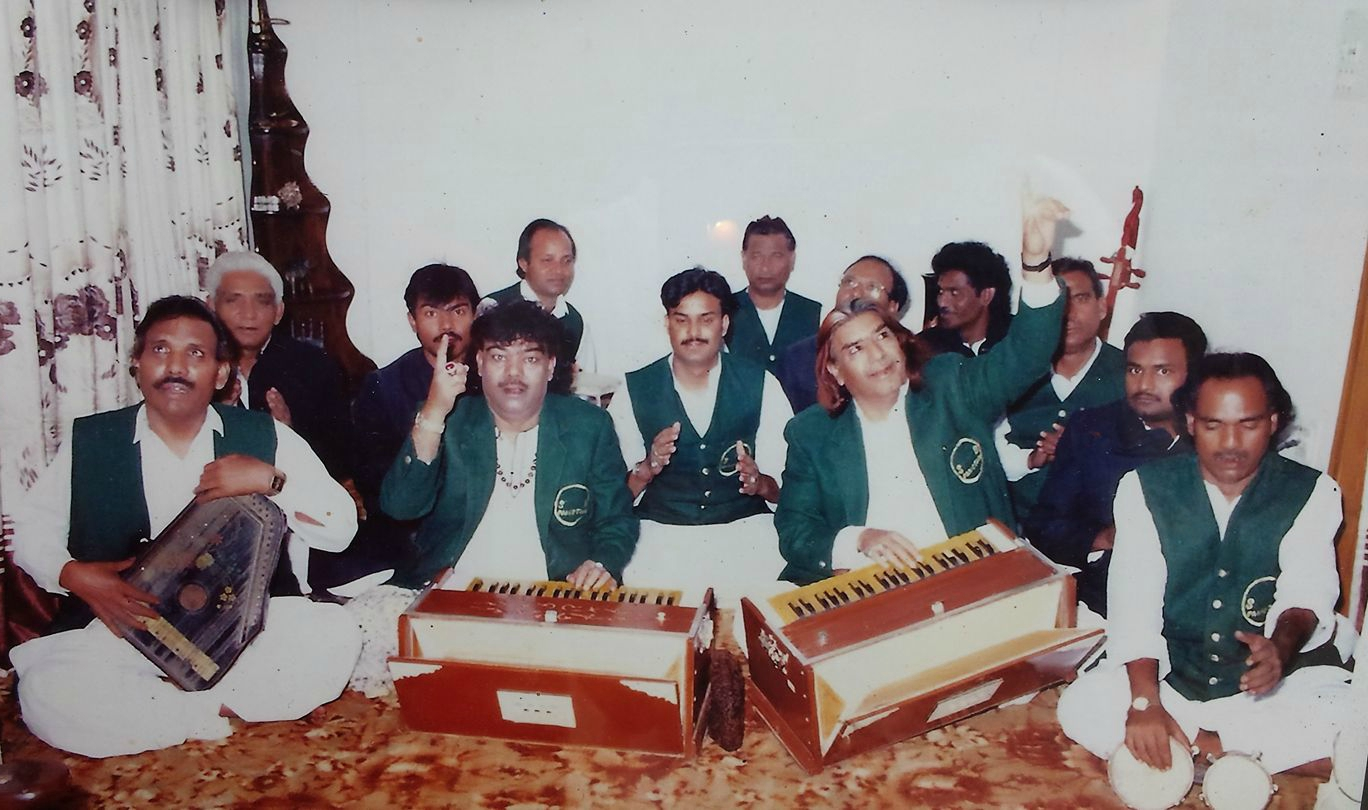
- The Sabri Brothers & Ensemble

Background information
- Origin: Kalyana, East Punjab, British India. Karachi, Pakistan (Post 1947).
- Genres: Qawwali
- Years active: 1956 – 2021
- Labels: EMI Pakistan; Arion; Auvidis; UNESCO; Real World; Piranha Records; Oriental Star Agencies; Xenophile; Sirocco; Nonesuch; Radio Pakistan; Pakistan Television Corporation; Pakistan National Council of the Arts; Doordarshan; All India Radio; Oriental Star Agencies
- Past members: Ghulam Farid Sabri (1956–94); Kamal Ahmed Khan Sabri (1956–1998); Maqbool Ahmed Sabri (1955–2011); Amjad Fareed Sabri (1982–2016); Mehmood Ghaznavi Sabri (1974–2021)

The Sabri Brothers (Urdu: صابری برادران) were two brothers from Pakistan who, performing as a musical duo at the head of their ensemble, were legendary exponents of Sufi qawwali music. Closely connected to the Chishti Order, they are widely considered to be among the greatest Sufi qawwali singers of all time. The ensemble was fronted by Ghulam Farid Sabri and his younger brother Maqbool Ahmed Sabri. Often referred to as the Shahanshah-e-Qawwali (the Emperors of Qawwali), they also became celebrated globally as the "roving ambassadors of Pakistan".

The band was initially founded by Maqbool Ahmed Sabri at the age of 11 years and was known as the Bacha Qawwal Party. His elder brother Ghulam Farid Sabri joined after insistence from their father. He became the leader of the group, and the band soon became known as the Sabri Brothers. They were the first-ever Qawwali artists to perform qawwali in the United States and other Western countries; they were also the first-ever Asian artists to perform at New York's Carnegie Hall in 1975.

== Original members ==
- Ghulam Farid Sabri (b. 1930 in Kalyana, East Punjab – d. 5 April 1994 in Karachi; lead vocals, harmonium, leader of the ensemble till his death in 1994)
- Maqbool Ahmed Sabri (b. 12 October 1945 in Kalyana- d. 21 September 2011 in South Africa; leading member of the ensemble, lead vocals, harmonium, music composer, sole leader of the ensemble from Ghulam Farid Sabri's death in 1994 until his own death in 2011.)
- Kamal Ahmed Khan Sabri (b. 1935 – d. 2002; senior member, vocals, swarmandal, flexatone)
- Mehmood Ghaznavi Sabri (b. 7 April 1949 in Karachi – d. 21 June 2021 in Karachi; senior member, vocals, bongo drums, tambourine; second lead singer/harmonium after Ghulam Farid Sabri's death in 1994; leader of the ensemble after Maqbool Ahmed Sabri's death in 2011)
- Umar Daraz (clapping / chorus)
- Abdul Aziz (clapping / chorus)
- Masihuddin (chorus, tanpura)
- Abdul Karim (dholak)
- Bilal Sabri (dholak)
- Mohammed Anwar (nal, tabla)
- Amjad Fareed Sabri (clapping / chorus, until the death of his father, Ghulam Farid Sabri), supporting vocalist until 1996, lead vocals, harmonium in his own separate band (assassinated on 22 June 2016)
- Fazal Islam Sabri (clapping / chorus)
- Azmat Farid Sabri (clapping/chorus)
- Sarwat Farid Sabri (clapping / chorus)
- Naveed Kamal Sabri (clapping / chorus)
- Zubair Kamal Sabri (clapping / chorus)
- Shumail Maqbool Sabri (clapping / chorus)
- Javed Kamal Sabri (clapping / chorus)
- Ghulam Jilani (clapping / chorus)
- Abdul Ghani (dholak)
- Zafar Islam Sabri (clapping / chorus)
- Muhammad Akram Warsi (clapping / chorus)
- Nadeem Siddiqui (clapping / chorus)
- Muhammad Ateeq Sabri (clapping / chorus)

== Early life ==
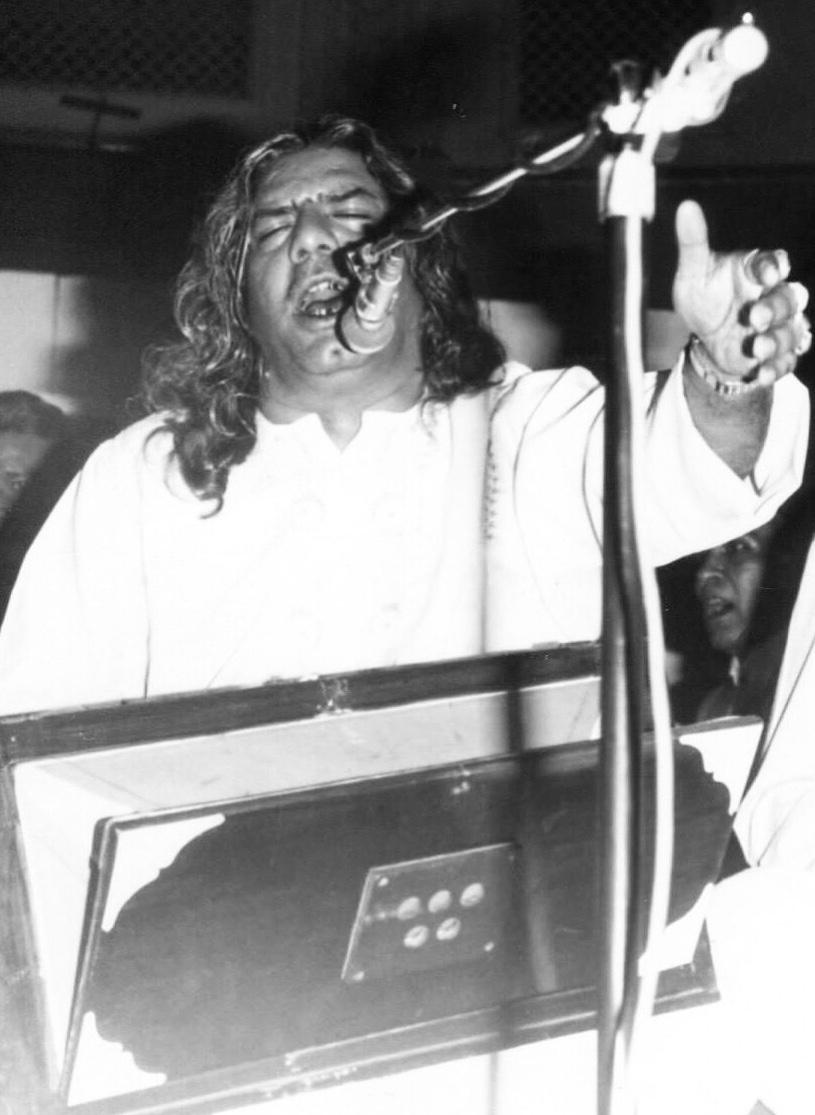
Ghulam Farid Sabri

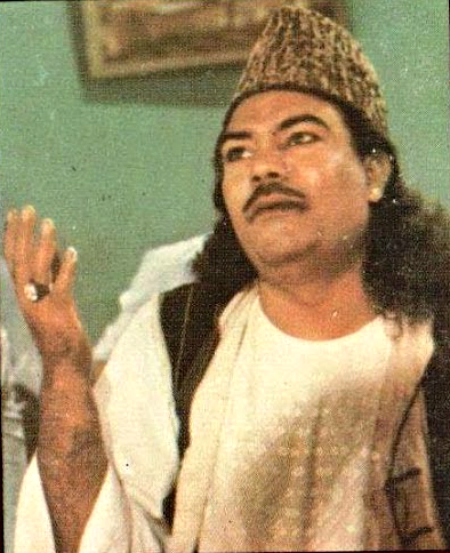
Maqbool Ahmed Sabri

The Sabri brothers learned music from their father, Inayat Hussain Sabri. He trained his sons in qawwali and Indian classical music. Their family came from a musical background, and claimed direct descent from Mian Tansen, who had played at the court of the 16th-century Mughal emperor Akbar. Mehboob Baksh Ranji Ali Rang, their paternal grandfather, was a master musician of his time; Baqar Hussein Khan, their maternal grandfather, was a unique sitarist. Ghulam Farid Sabri, Kamal Ahmed Sabri, Maqbool Ahmed Sabri and Mehmood Ghaznavi Sabri furthered their knowledge of music under Ustad Fatehdin Khan, Ustad Ramzan Khan, and Ustad Latafat Hussein Khan Rampuri. They also furthered their knowledge of poetry under Hazrat Hairat Ali Shah Warsi, who was their mother's spiritual master.

Ghulam Farid Sabri's first public performance was at the annual Urs festival of Mubarak Shah in Kalyana (now in Haryana, India) in 1946. He had joined Ustad Kallan Khan's qawwali party in India. The family moved from Kalyana to Karachi, Pakistan following the Partition of India in 1947. In Pakistan, a wealthy businessman approached him and offered him a partnership in a nightclub, yet Ghulam Farid's reply was that he only wanted to sing qawwali, and he rejected the offer.

Maqbool Ahmed Sabri also showed musical talent from a young age, which was noticed by his school teacher who later asked Maqbool's father to further instruct him and guide him in the field of music. In 1955, when Maqbool was eleven years old, his brother-in-law got him a job singing at a theater in Karachi where he gave his first public performance. Later, with the help of his father, Maqbool formed a qawwali group at the age of eleven and named it Bacha Qawwal Party. The group's first public performance was in 1956 at an Urs ceremony held at the home of Jameel Amrohi, where he sang "Do Alam Ba Kakul Giraftar Daari" in the presence of many qawwals.

Soon afterwards, after insistence by their father, Ghulam Farid Sabri joined him and became the leader of the ensemble, which was initially known as Ghulam Farid Sabri Qawwal Rangeen Raagi & Party. Afterwards, the name of the party was changed to Ghulam Farid Sabri – Maqbool Ahmed Sabri Qawwal & Party. During their 1975 American tour, their promoter Beate Gordon suggested the band name was too long, so they changed it to The Sabri Brothers.

== Career ==
=== Early career ===
The Sabri Brothers initially started their career by performing at Sufi Shrines and private gatherings, Their first recording was officially released in 1958 under the EMI Pakistan label, was the Urdu qawwali titled "Mera Koi Nahi Hai Tera Siwa", which later appeared in the 1965 Pakistani film Ishq-e-Habib.

=== 1970s ===
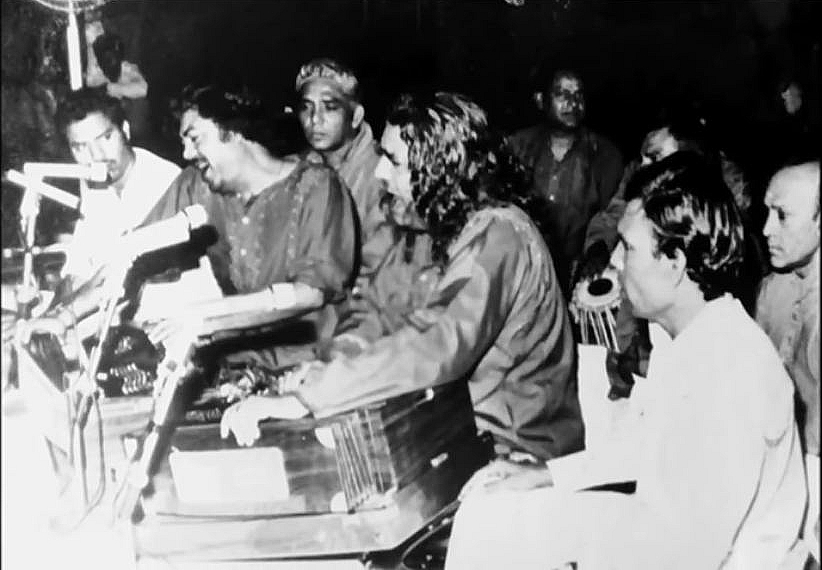
Sabri Brothers performing in India during year 1977

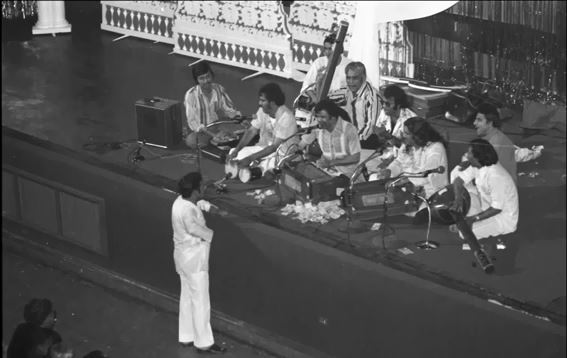
Sabri Brothers in South Africa 1978

1970s witnessed the rise of the Sabri Brothers. They are the only qawwali troupe with "first class" status on the Pakistan Television Corporation.

In 1970, the government of Pakistan sent them to Nepal as representatives for a royal wedding.

During the 1970s, the Sabri Brothers released their greatest hit qawwalis which included "Tajdar-e-Haram", "O Sharabi Chord De Peena", "Khwaja Ki Deewani", and "Sar E La Makan Se Talab Hui."

Several qawwalis sung by them were even featured in films, which included "Mohabbat Karne Walo Hum Mohabbat Iss Ko Kehte Hai" in the 1970 film Chand Suraj, "Aaye Hai Tere Dar Pe Toh Kuch Le Ke Jaen Ge" in the 1972 film Ilzam, "Bhar Do Jholi Meri Ya Muhammad" in the 1975 film Bin Badal Barsaat, "Baba Farid Sarkar" in the 1974 film Sasta Khoon Mehnga Pani, "Teri Nazr-e-Karam Ka Sahara Mile" in the 1976 film Sachaii, "Mamoor horha hai" in the 1977 film Dayar-e-Paighambran and "Aftab-e-Risalat" in the 1979 Indian film Sultan-e-Hind.

In 1972, they performed a charity concert for the construction of Pakistani Children School in Abu Dhabi. In the same year, with the co-operation of Oriental Star Agencies, the Sabri Brothers performed in various cities in England such as London, Bradford, Birmingham and Manchester, which was very popular. The proceeds of these programs were donated to an Earthquake Relief Fund in Pakistan.

The Sabri Brothers were the first-ever qawwali artists to perform in United States, Europe, and other Western countries. They were the first exponents of qawwali to the West when they performed at New York's Carnegie Hall in 1975, promoted and sponsored by Beate Gordon of the Asia Society. The Sabri Brothers performed in the United States and Canada under the auspices of the Performing Arts Program of the Asia Society in 1975 and recorded a qawwali program at Brooklyn College Television Center.

In 1975, the Sabri Brothers toured and performed at live concerts in South Africa. Inspired by their live concerts in South Africa, Chevrolet gifted an automatic car to the Sabri Brothers, which they donated for the development of poor children. They also donated the proceeds of their live concerts on that tour towards famine relief in South Africa.

The Sabri Brothers performed at Royal Albert Hall on 20 June 1976 at the World of Islam Festival. In April 1978, the album Qawwali was recorded in the United States, while the Sabri Brothers were on tour. The New York Times' review described the album as "the aural equivalent of dancing dervishes" and the "music of feeling."

In 1977, the Sabri Brothers toured India; their concerts were attended by many Bollywood celebrities. During that tour they recorded Aftaab E Risalat Madine Mei Hai which was featured in the 1979 Bollywood film Sultan E Hind Khwaja Garib Nawaz. Aftab E Risalat's music video even featured an appearance by the Sabri Brothers and was a blockbuster hit.

In 1977, they recorded the album Pakistan: The Music of the Qawwal for the UNESCO Collection of Traditional Music which was later released in CD form by Auvidis in 1990.

In 1979, they performed a charity concert for the construction of Karachi School of Art which was later released in album Sabri Brothers Live in Concert at Ali Bhai Auditorium.

=== 1980s ===
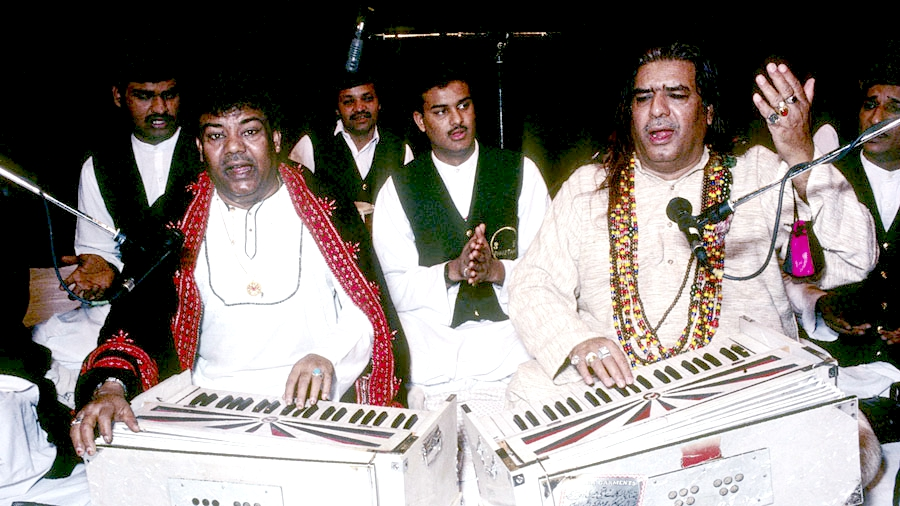
Sabri Brothers performing in France

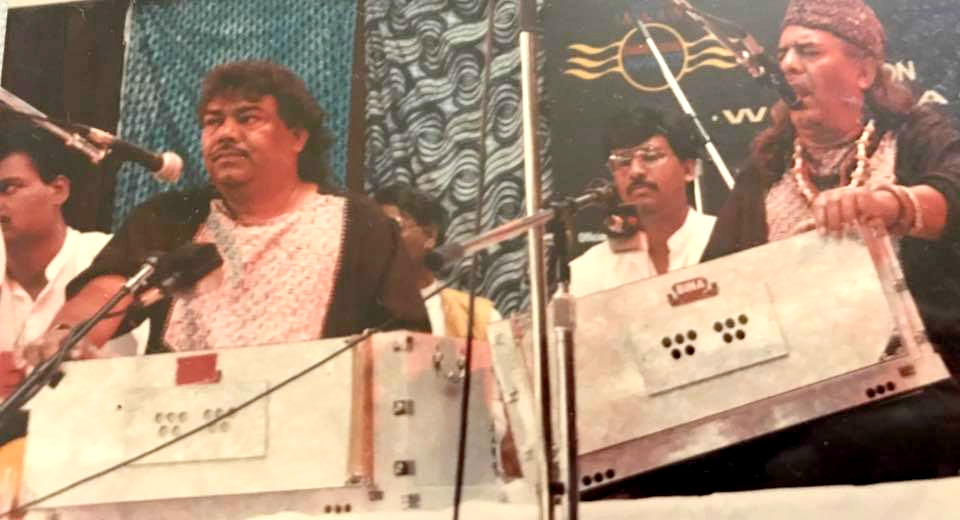
Sabri Brothers performing in The WOMAD Festival, 1989

In June 1981, the Sabri Brothers performed at the Royal Tropical Institute in Amsterdam which was released on the album Tasleem.

In 1982, they appeared in the film Sahaaray with their famous qawwali "Tajdar-e-Haram." The same year they performed at Midway Hotel for the construction of Al Shifa Hospital near Karachi Airport.

In 1983, they recorded the album Nazre Shah Karim to commemorate the Silver Jubilee of His Highness Prince Aga Khan, sponsored by Tajico Group. The proceeds from this album were donated to Aga Khan Hospital, Karachi. On 3 August 1985, a program was held at Sheraton Hotel, Karachi and collected Rs. 141,500/- for the Bangladesh Flood Relief Fund.

In 1985, Maqbool Ahmed Sabri recorded a solo ghazal album in front of a live audience in Karachi; the album was released as Awargi, which was a blockbuster hit. The album had a collection of light playful poetry written by Farhat Shahzad.

In 1988 EMI Pakistan released another solo ghazal album by Maqbool Ahmed Sabri titled Tere Ghungroo Toot Gaye to Kya, which was a hit. The same year, he recorded a qawwali song for music director Anu Malik in the Indian movie Gangaa Jamunaa Saraswati, which was picturised on Mithun Chakraborty.

In 1989, the Sabri Brothers performed at WOMAD festival concerts which were held in UK and France. During their tour of the UK in 1989, the Sabri Brothers recorded an album which was released as the album Ya Habib in 1990 by Peter Gabriel's Real World Records. The album Ya Habib consists of four long songs, each combining powerful, sensitive, often improvised vocals with rhythmic percussion, thudding tabla and mesmeric harmonium drones, which proved to be one of the Sabri Brothers' greatest hits. The same year, they performed at International Flamenco Festival held in France.

In 1989 and 1992, Sabri Brothers performed at various South Asian Association for Regional Cooperation festivals.

=== 1990s ===
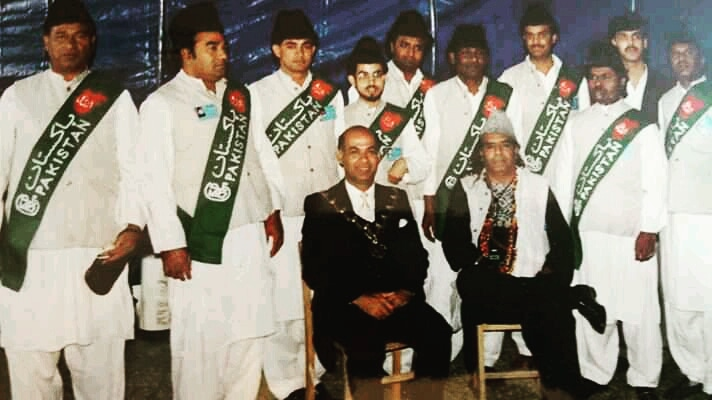
Sabri brothers led by Ghulam Farid Sabri In Nottingham, 1991

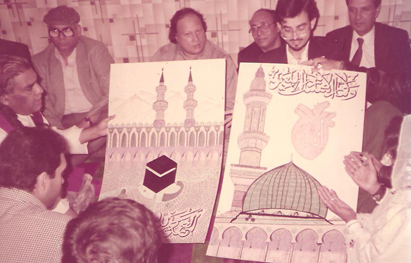
Ghulam Farid Sabri with Nusrat Fateh Ali Khan

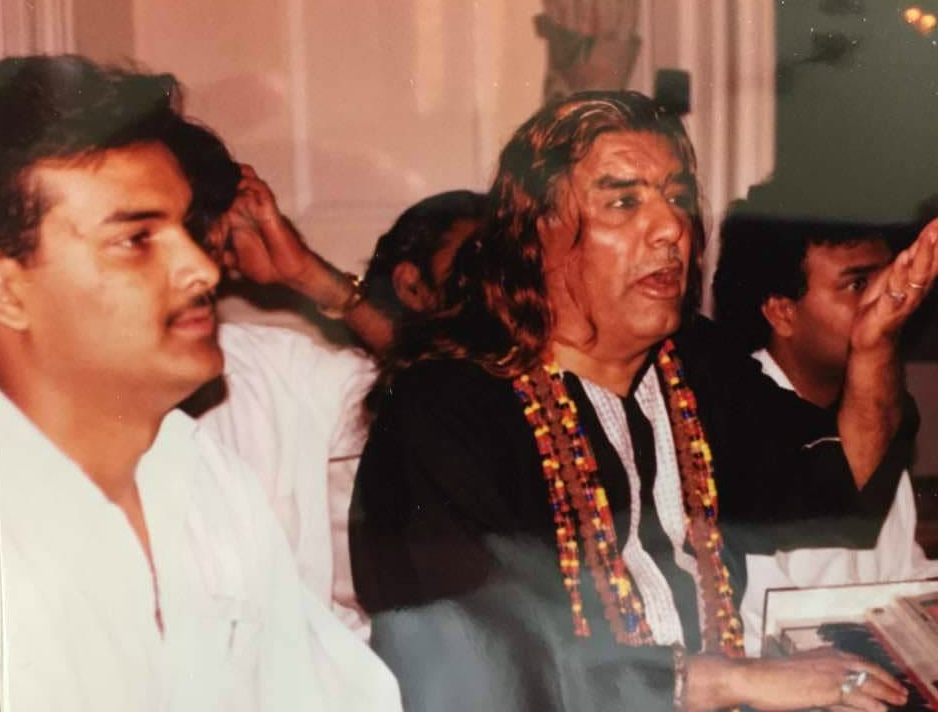
Ghulam Farid Sabri performing Qawwali with his son Amjad Sabri

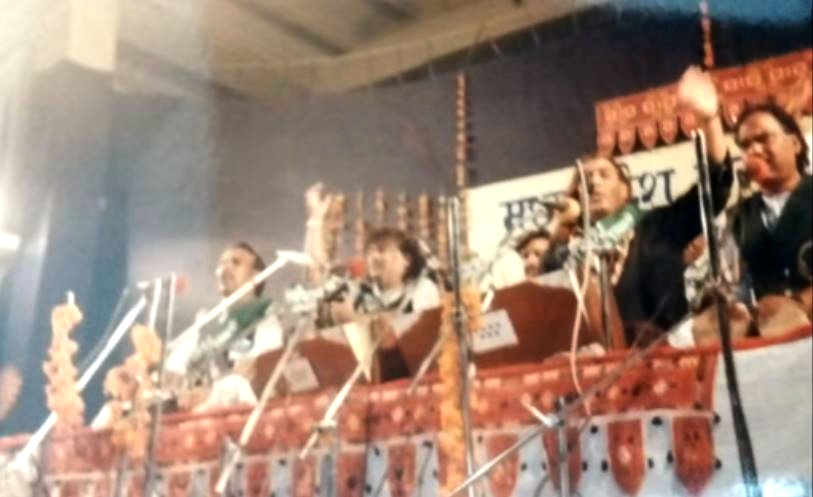
Sabri Brothers performing at SAARC Festival concert Held In Bhopal, 1992

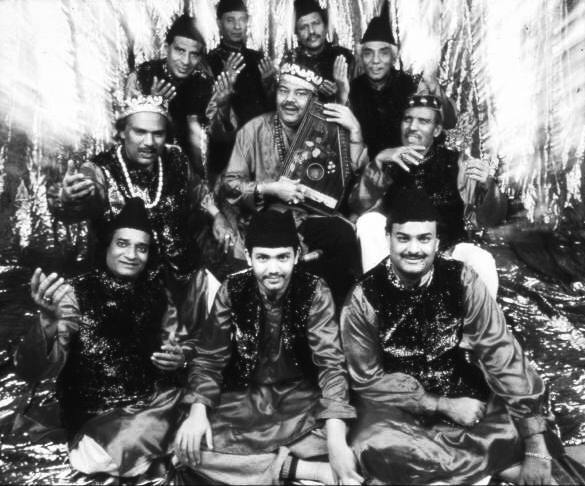
The Sabri Brothers in New York, 1996

In 1990, the Sabri Brothers performed at various qawwali concerts in England.

In 1991, Ghulam Farid Sabri toured Europe and performed qawwali in the United Kingdom and Germany. He also performed at Heimatklänge Festival held in Germany in 1991. The same year, Maqbool Ahmed Sabri toured and performed in various qawwali concerts held in South Africa.

In 1992, the Sabri Brothers, led by Ghulam and Maqbool, toured Australia and performed at the Hope Theater in Melbourne, Australia. Their tour of Australia was sponsored by the Friends of the University of Wollongong. The same year they performed at a fundraiser in Dubai to benefit Shaukat Khanum Memorial Cancer Hospital. In 1992 they also performed in various countries for the SAARC festival.

In 1993, the Sabri Brothers once again toured the United States and performed at various qawwali concerts there.

In April 1994, The Sabri brothers were set to begin on a tour across Europe. They were to perform at around 30–35 shows, covering almost the entire continent. On 5 April 1994, Ghulam Farid Sabri suddenly complained of chest pain. He suffered a massive heart attack and was rushed to hospital but he died en route in the arms of his brother Maqbool Ahmed Sabri. Maqbool Ahmed Sabri was left heartbroken but still carried on his and his elder brother's mission. To devote an album entirely to the Persian poetry of Jami, a luminary of the Sufi tradition, was one of Ghulam Farid Sabri's cherished ambitions. He made the recordings in July 1991 at the SFB studios in Berlin, but the CD was not released while he was still alive. Thus, it becomes a memorial not only to the Persian poet, but also to Ghulam Farid Sabri. After the death of Ghulam Farid Sabri in 1994, Maqbool Ahmed Sabri became the sole leader of The Sabri Brothers with his youngest brother Mehmood Ghaznavi Sabri taking the role of second lead vocalist and harmonium player.

Also in 1994, Sabri Brothers led by Maqbool Ahmed Sabri and Mehmood Ghaznavi Sabri performed at the Womex festival and New Jazz Festival held in Germany.

In 1995, Maqbool Ahmed Sabri was about to perform at the Meltdown Festival held in the UK. A week before the event, he suffered a major accident in Lahore. He was in critical condition during that time, and people worldwide prayed for his health. He recovered miraculously within a month, though he had a damaged leg after the accident and had to undergo multiple knee surgeries.

In 1996, The Sabri Brothers performed at the Brooklyn Academy of Music – Next Wave Festival, as part of a double-billing with alternative rockers Cornershop, and released an album titled Ya Mustapha (or Ya Mustafa). The album became one of their greatest hits.

In 1997, The Sabri Brothers once again performed at the Royal Albert Hall in front of the Prince of Wales, Prince Charles for the Celebration of 50 Years of Independence of India and Pakistan together with Sri Lanka and Bangladesh. They were one of the few artists who have performed at the Royal Albert Hall multiple times. The Sabri Brothers also performed Waqt E Dua Hai which is one of their popular qawwalis at Symphony Hall, Birmingham, for the celebration of 50 Years of Independence of India and Pakistan together with Sri Lanka and Bangladesh.

In 1998, The Sabri Brothers toured Australia and also performed at the Sydney Opera House. Shortly after the program at the Opera House, Kamal Ahmed Sabri (second eldest of the brothers), the supporting vocalist and instrumentalist of the group, suffered a heart attack. Though he survived, he could not take part due to poor health.

In 1999, The Sabri Brothers participated in the Voices of God festival in Marrakesh, Morocco in May. The group also performed at various qawwali concerts held in Morocco in 1999.

=== 2000 onwards ===
The Sabri Brothers performed at Musica Sacra International Marktoberdorf Event concerts during the year 2000 in Germany. They also performed at Sufi Soul Festival held in Kall, Germany.

Maqbool Ahmed Sabri and Mehmood Ghaznavi Sabri did several tours of India and recorded various albums which were released by Tips Music.

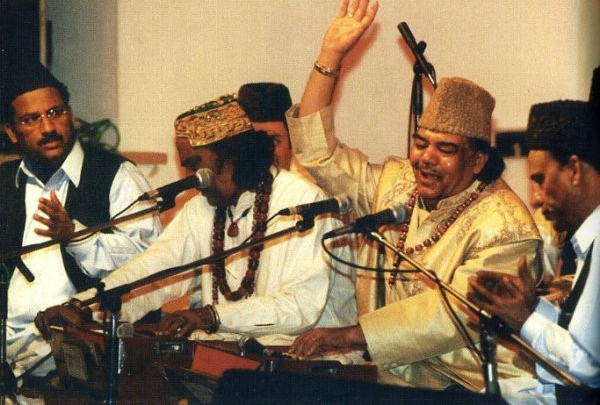
Maqbool Ahmed Sabri & Mehmood Ghaznavi Sabri Leading The Sabri Brothers In Moscow, 2001

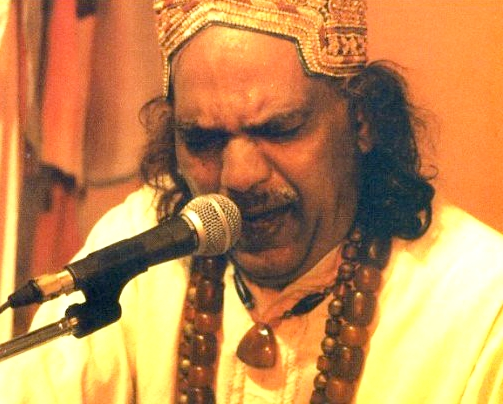
Mehmood Ghaznavi Sabri performing in Moscow, 2001

In 2001, Kamal Ahmed Sabri, the second eldest of the Sabri Brothers, died after suffering a second heart attack. After his death, the use of instruments such as swarmandal (zither) and chidya tarang (Flexatone) came to an end in the Sabri Brothers group. Later the same year, the Sabri Brothers performed live in DOM at the On The Carpet Oriental Culture Festival on 17 November 2001 in Moscow, which was later released in 2003 as the album Live in Moscow – Diwani.

In 2005, The Sabri Brothers performed at Virsast Festival held in Dehradun, India. The same year, Maqbool Ahmed Sabri was invited to perform in different cities in Madhya Pradesh, India, and was awarded the Tansen Samman Award by the government of Madhya Pradesh.

In 2006, the Sabri Brothers performed at Ajmer Sharif and in Pune, Maharashtra. The same year, Maqbool Ahmed Sabri rerecorded and re-released his old hit qawwalis including "Khwaja Ki Deewani", "Mera Koi Nahi Hai Tere Siwa", "Mann Bole Mann", and "Hum Panjatani Hai" which were released by SB Studios in Karachi and proved to be a big hit worldwide.

The Sabri Brothers led by Maqbool Ahmed Sabri and Mehmood Ghaznavi Sabri continued to tour and performed in Russia in the year 2007.

Maqbool Ahmed Sabri went on various tours and performed at qawwali concerts until his death. He performed in Hyderabad, India in 2008. He also performed at Ajmer Sharif during the annual Urs celebrations of Khwaja Garib Nawaz in 2011. His last concert was organized by Hilton Hotel in South Africa in 2011. After that, since then his health was not good. On 21 September 2011, Maqbool Ahmed Sabri died in South Africa due to cardiac arrest after being treated for two months for health problems. He was buried near his elder brother Ghulam Farid Sabri.

The group was then led by the youngest brother Mehmood Ghaznavi Sabri, who was the last brother alive leading the group after the deaths of Ghulam Farid Sabri and Maqbool Ahmed Sabri. Mehmood Ghaznavi Sabri led the Sabri Brothers until his own death on 21 June 2021. He organized many programs in Europe to collect donations for the Namal Institute located in Mianwali District, Punjab, which was established by the Prime Minister of Pakistan, Imran Khan. The funds collected were sent home after the many programs hosted in Europe. Mehmood's qawwalis were well-received across the globe, including in Germany and several European countries.

With the death of Mehmood Ghaznavi Sabri on 21 June 2021, the Sabri Brothers group came to an end. Other family members and disciples of the Sabri Brothers continue to perform in their own separate qawwali groups to carry on the legacy of Ghulam Farid Sabri, Maqbool Ahmed Sabri and the Sabri Brothers.

== Legacy ==
- The Sabri Brothers received the honor of performing in Madina Sharif, near Al-Masjid an-Nabawi.
- They were well-versed in singing in the Persian language and had a great affinity for the musical rendition of Amir Khusrow's kalaam (poetry).
- Legendary Sufi Singer Abida Parveen was a student of the Sabri Brothers. Abida Parveen revealed in an interview that she has taken inspiration from the Sabri Brothers and also learnt the song "Man Kunto Maula" from them.
- They have been mentioned in Cassette Culture Popular Music and Technology in North India a book written by writer Peter Manuel regarding the impact of cassette technology on popular music in North India.
- A life-size painting of Ghulam Farid Sabri that dominates the meeting room of his home was created by painters from Naz Cinema for the first anniversary of his death in 1995.
- In 2003, British singer Sami Yusuf released a cover version of Sabri Brothers's golden hit Ya Mustafa and featured it on his debut album titled Al-Muʽallim. During one of his interviews with BBC, Yusuf claimed that he was inspired by the Sabri Brothers and their music is without doubt the music of spirituality and peace. He also claimed that his inspiration from the Sabri Brothers led him to cover one of their hits on his album. Yusuf accepted that this turned out to be one of his most famous works.
- In 2006, Amatullah Armstrong Chishti wrote a book titled The Lamp of Love – Journeying with the Sabri Brothers regarding the research program into the Sufi saints and their mazars (shrines) in Pakistan and India, and the Art of Qawwali of Pakistan's best-loved Sufi singers, the Sabri Brothers.
- They have been featured in "La Morte Du Bombay Express" fictional detective novel written by Sarah Dars in 2002 wherein The protagonist attended the musical concert of Sabri Brothers, nearly a whole chapter was dedicated to their performance.
- In March 2008, an underpass near Liaquatabad, Karachi was named after Ghulam Farid Sabri.
- Coke Studio Season 8 paid a special tribute to the Sabri Brothers with Atif Aslam performing the all-time hit "Tajdar-e-Haram."
- "Bhar do Jholi Meri Ya Muhammad" was featured in the 2015 Bollywood movie Bajrangi Bhaijaan sung by Adnan Sami Khan with few changes in melody and lyrics.
- "Tajdar-e-Haram" was featured in the 2018 Bollywood movie Satyameva Jayate and was covered by Sajid–Wajid and sung by Wajid Khan from the same duo.
- In 2021, singer Ali Zafar released his own cover version of "Balaghal Ula Bi Kamaalihi (Sar E La Makan Se Talab Hui)" as a tribute to Ghulam Farid Sabri, Maqbool Ahmed Sabri, and Amjad Farid Sabri.
- In 2025, singer Hadiqa Kiyani released her own cover version of Paisa Bolta Hai with the title Hayat as a tribute to Sabri Brothers in her album Sufi Core .

== Awards and recognition ==
- Pride of Performance (Tamgha E Husn E Kaarkardagi) Award by the President of Pakistan in 1978 to the whole Sabri Brothers group.
- Spirit of Detroit Award by the federal government of the United States to both Ghulam Farid Sabri and Maqbool Ahmed Sabri in 1981.
- Khusro Rang to both Ghulam Farid Sabri and Maqbool Ahmed Sabri by the Raag Rang Society of India in 1980.
- Bulbul E Pak O Hind by the Shrine of Nizamuddin Auliya to Ghulam Farid Sabri and Maqbool Ahmed Sabri in 1977.
- Charles de Gaulle Award by Charles de Gaulle to Ghulam Farid Sabri and Maqbool Ahmed Sabri in 1983.
- A doctorate degree was awarded to the Sabri Brothers as an honor for their hit record Shikwa Jawab E Shikwa (Of Allama Iqbal) by the University of Oxford.
- Tansen Samman (India) was awarded to Maqbool Ahmed Sabri in 2005 by the government of Madhya Pradesh.

== Qawwalis featured in films ==
Several of their qawwalis were featured in films.

- "Mera Koi Nahi Hai Tere Siwa" appeared in the 1965 Pakistani film Ishq-e-Habib
- "Mohabbat Karne Walo Hum Mohabbat Iss Ko Kehte Hai" in the 1970 Pakistani film Chand Suraj
- "Aaye Hai Tere Dar Pe Toh Kuch Le Ke Jayen Ge" in the 1972 Pakistani film Ilzam
- "Baba Farid Sarkar" in the 1974 Pakistani Punjabi film Sasta Khoon Mehenga Paani
- "Bhar Do Jholi Meri Ya Muhammad" in the 1975 Pakistani film Bin Badal Barsaat
- "Teri Nazr-e-Karam" in the 1976 Pakistani film Sachaii
- "Mamoor Ho Raha Hai" in the 1977 Pakistani film Dayar-e-Paighambran
- "Aftab E Risalat" in the 1979 Indian Hindi film Sultan-e-Hind Khwaja Garib Nawaz (RA)
- "Tajdar-e-Haram" in the 1982 Pakistani film Sahaaray
- "Tere Dar Ko Chord Chale" with solo playback by Maqbool Ahmed Sabri, was featured in the 1988 Indian film Gangaa Jamunaa Saraswati

== Qawwalis featured in television series ==
- "Tere Ishq Nachaya" sung by Sabri Brothers was featured in the Pakistan Television Corporation hit series Aik Mohabbat Sau Afsanay aired during 1975–1976 which was written by Ashfaq Ahmed. The drama was a successful series of 13 episodes based on Ashfaq Ahmed's book of the same title. The qawwali was featured in the episode titled "Qurat - Ul - Ain."
- The title song of ARY Digital's drama serial Muqaddas (2007) was sung by Maqbool Ahmed Sabri.

== Discography ==
=== Concert films ===
- 1975 Qawwali, Music from Pakistan – Live in America
- 1981 Live in England – Vol 1
- 1988 Live in England – Vol 2
- 1988 Live in England – Vol 3
- 1988 Live in England – Vol 4
- 1986 Qawali – The Sabri Brothers (Live at Shrine of Hazrat Abdullah Shah Ghazi)
- 1992 Sabri Brothers Live in India (SAARC)

=== Albums ===
- 1969 Tajdar-e-Haram Ho Nigah-e-Karam (Columbia)
- 1970 Ghulam Farid Maqbool Sabri Qawal And Party – O' Laaj Mori Rakh (Columbia)
- 1970 Devotional Songs (EMI Pakistan)
- 1970 Qawwali – Ya Mohammad Nigah-e-Karam (EMI Pakistan)
- 1970 Qawwali – Mere Khoon e Arzoo Ko (EMI Pakistan)
- 1971 Ghulam Farid Maqbool Sabri Qawal And Party – Balaghal Ula Be Kamalehi (EMI Pakistan)
- 1972 Ghulam Farid Maqbool Sabri Qawal And Party – Aaye Ri More Angna Moinud Din (Angel Records)
- 1972 Qawwali – Karam Asiyo Par Ho (EMI Pakistan)
- 1974 Nazrana E Aqidat (Angel Records)
- 1975 Ghulam Farid Maqbool Sabri Qawal And Party – Sab Se Bara Darbar-E-Madina (EMI Pakistan)
- 1975 Ghulam Farid Maqbool Sabri Qawal And Party – Teri Surat Nigahon Men (EMI Pakistan)
- 1975 Ghulam Farid Maqbool Sabri Qawal And Party – Mohammad Ki Chatai Ne Bhi (Odeon)
- 1975 Ghulam Farid Maqbool Sabri Qawal And Party – Na Samjho Khak Ka Putla (Odeon)
- 1975 Sabri Brothers – More Ghar Aj Mohammed Aaye (Odeon)
- 1975 Sabri Brothers – Ya Mohammad Noor-e-Mujasim (Angel Records)
- 1976 Deewani Kawaja Ki Deewani / O Sharabi Chod De Peena (EMI Pakistan)
- 1977 Sabri Brothers – Aaye Hain Woh (Shalimar Recording Company Limited)
- 1977 Ghulam Farid Maqbool Sabri Qawal And Party – Ya Sahebal Jamal (Odeon)
- 1977 Pakistan : The Music of Qawwal (UNESCO)
- 1977 Ghulam Farid Maqbool Sabri Qawal And Party – Bhar Do Jholi Meri Ya Mohammed (Angel Records)
- 1978 Qaw Allis Vol. 6 – Gulam Shabri Live Recording in S. Africa (Ashirwad)
- 1978 Kawwali Musicians from Pakistan (Arion)
- 1978 Qawwali – Sufi Music From Pakistan (Nonesuch)
- 1979 Music of Pakistan – Qawwali – Live in Concert (Vinyl LP Record, 1979)
- 1979 Sabri Brothers Qawwal (EMI Pakistan)
- 1979 Shikwa Jawab Shikwa (EMI Pakistan)
- 1980 Greatest Qawwali's of Sabri Brothers (EMI Pakistan)
- 1980 Latest Qawwalis from Sabri Brothers (EMI Pakistan)
- 1980 Sabri Brothers in Concert – Vol.1–3 (EMI Pakistan)
- 1980 Sabri Brothers Live Concert Vol −16 (EMI Pakistan)
- 1980 Sabri Brothers – Mehfil-E-Programme Vol −17 (EMI Pakistan)
- 1982 Jhoot Ke Paon Nahin Hain (EMI Pakistan)
- 1982 Sabri Brothers – Ghulam Farid & Maqbool Sabri (EMI Pakistan)
- 1982 Maqbool Ahmed Sabri – Urdu Ghazal (EMI Pakistan)
- 1983 New Qawwali's By Sabri Brothers (EMI Pakistan)
- 1983 Nazr-e-Shah Karim (AEA)
- 1984 Jogan Daata Di (EMI Pakistan)
- 1985 Hits of Sabri Brothets (EMI Pakistan)
- 1985 Awargi (CBS)
- 1986 Ya Muhammad Nigahe Karam (EMI Pakistan)
- 1987 Sur Bahar " Amir Khusro " (EMI Pakistan)
- 1988 Shan-E-Aulia (EMI Pakistan)
- 1988 Maqbool Ahmed Sabri – Tere Ghungroo Toot Gaye Toh Kya – Ghazals (EMI Pakistan)
- 1988 Live at Allah Ditta Hall (UK Tour)
- 1990 Sabri Brothers New Qawwali's 1990 (EMI Pakistan)
- 1990 The Music of the Qawwali (Auvidis, UNESCO)
- 1990 Ya Habib (Real World)
- 1993 Qawwali Masterworks (Piranha Records)
- 1993 Doolha Heryale [Doolha Hariyaale], (Shalimar Recording Company)
- 1993 Bangai Baat Unka Karam Ho Gaya Vol 2 - (Oriental Strar Agencies)
- 1993 Pyar Ke Morr Live in Concert(Oriental Star Agencies)
- 1993 La Ilah Ki Boli Bol (EMI Pakistan)
- 1994 Shehanshah-e-Qawwali Ki Yaad Mein – Vol.1–2, (EMI Pakistan)
- 1994 Savere Savere (Oriental Star Agencies)
- 1994 La Elah Ki Boli Bol (Oriental Star Agencies)
- 1994–97 Greatest Hits of Sabri Brothers, Vol.1–3 (Sirocco)
- 1994 Milta Hai Kya Namaz Mein – Live in UK (Oriental Star Agencies)
- 1995 Maqbool Ahmed Sabri – Aawargi Vol 3 (Eastern Music Productions)
- 1996 Jami (Piranha)
- 1996 Ya Mustapha [Ya Mustafa], (Xenophile)
- 1996 Allah Baqi (Oriental Star Agencies)
- 1996 Ae Mere Hamnasheen (Oriental Star Agencies)
- 1996 Khawaja Ki Diwani – Live in Europe 1981 (Oriental Star Agencies)
- 1996 Tajdar-e-Haram (Oriental Star Agencies)
- 1997 Nazan Hai Jis Pai Husn (Oriental Star Agencies)
- 1997 Maikadah – Live in Concert (Oriental Star Agencies)
- 1997 Balaghul Ula Bekamalehi (Oriental Star Agencies)
- 1998 Hazir Hain (Oriental Star Agencies)
- 1999 Madeena Na Dekha (Sonic Enterprises)
- 2000 Madina Mujhe De De (Tips Music Company)
- 2001 Ya Raematal Lilalmin (Oriental Star Agencies)
- 2002 Dar Pe Deewane Aaye Hai (Tips Music Company)
- 2003 Bindia Lagaon Kabhi (Oriental Star Agencies)
- 2003 Jhoole Jhoole Ji Mohammad (Oriental Star Agencies)
- 2003 Live in Moscow Diwani, (Long Arms Record)
- 2003 Tasleem Live At Royal Tropical Institute, Amsterdam, 1981 (PAN Records)
- 2004 Aaj Rang Hai Ri (Tips Music Company)
- 2004 Rabb E Akbar (Tips Music Company)
- 2005 Jitna Diya Sarkar Ne Mujhko (Oriental Star Agencies)
- 2005 Mangte Hai Karam Unka (Oriental Star Agencies)
- 2006 Mera Koi Nahi Hai Tere Siwa – Maqbool Ahmed Sabri Naye Andaz Mein (SB Enterprises)
- 2007 Ajmer Ko Jana Hai (Oriental Star Agencies)
- 2007 Posheeda Posheeda – Live in Concert UK (Oriental Star Agencies)
- 2007 Piya Ghar Aya (Oriental Star Agencies)
- 2016 Showcase Southasia, Vol.18 – Sabri Brothers (EMI Pakistan)

Contributing artist

- 1965 Ishq E Habib & Eid Mubarak – Movie Tracks (Columbia & EMI Pakistan)
- 1975 Devotional Qawwalis From Films (EMI Pakistan)
- 1987 Sher E Yazdaan Ali Ali (EMI Pakistan)
- 1987 Maikhana – Aziz Miyan & Sabri Brothers (EMI Pakistan)
- 1991 Music in Asian Islam (Recordings And Liner Notes, MCM)
- 1996 The Rough Guide to the Music of India and Pakistan (World Music Network)
- 2006 The Best of Sabri Brothers & Nusrat Fateh Ali Khan (EMI Pakistan)
- 2012 Great Works of Amir Khusro – Vol 1 & 2 (Virgin Records, India)
- 2014 Essential Sufi Meditations – Famous Songs of Pakistan with the Masters Nusrat Fateh Ali Khan, Sabri Brothers, And Rahat Fateh Ali Khan (Celebration Sounds)

== See also ==
- Ghulam Farid Sabri
- Maqbool Ahmed Sabri
- Amjad Sabri
- List of Pakistani music bands
