= Syed Mohammad Nizami =

Indian Muslim scholar (died 2026)

Khwaja Syed Mohammad Nizami (died 7 February 2026) was an Indian Muslim scholar who was the chief sajjadanasheen (head custodian) of Nizamuddin Aulia Dargah Shrine. He was the nephew of Khwaja Hasan Sani Nizami and was his successor to Dargah Shrine from 2015.

== Biography ==
Khwaja Syed Mohammad Nizami
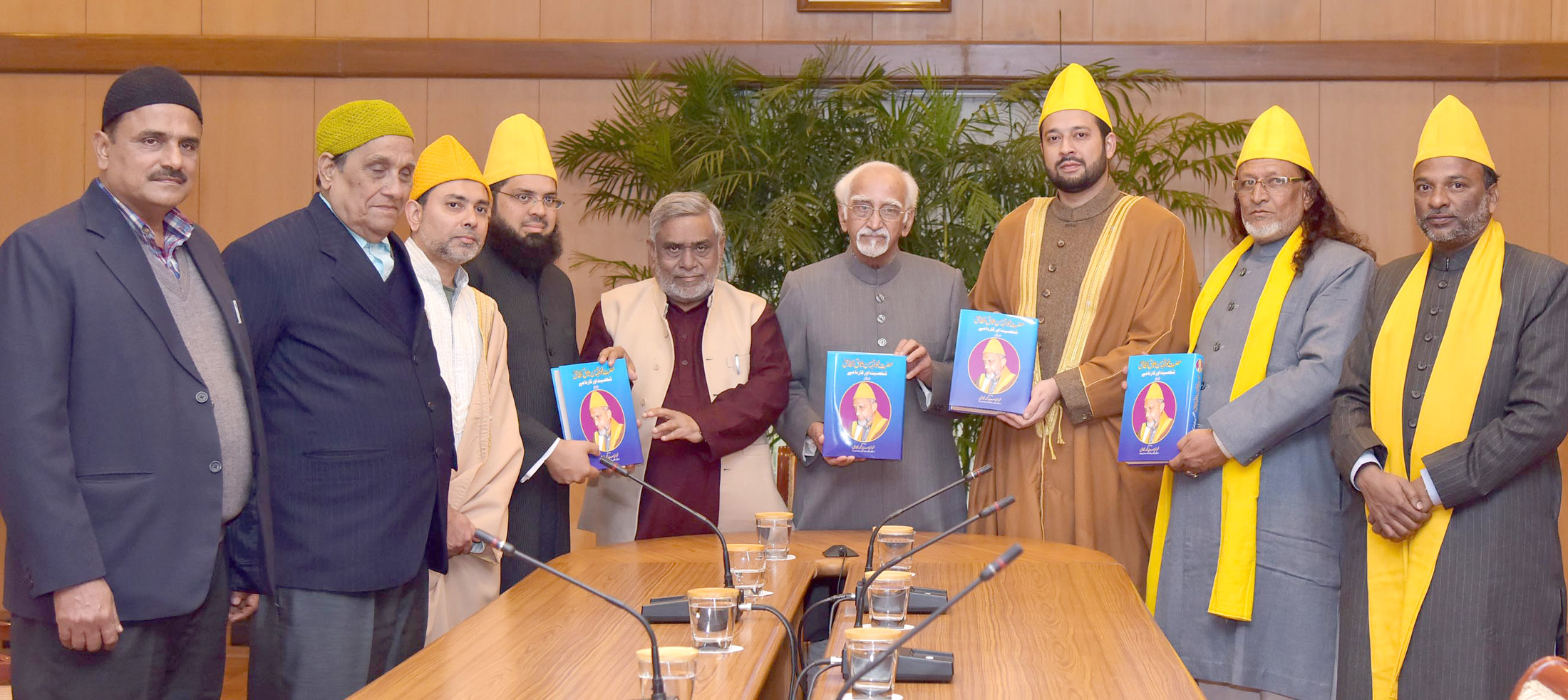
- Nizami in 2017 with the then Vice-president of India, Hamid Ansari and others

Personal life
- Born: November 22, 1978
- Died: February 7, 2026 (aged 47)
- Resting place: Khwaja Hall, Basti Hazrat Nizamuddin, New Delhi, India

Religious life
- Religion: Islam
- Denomination: Sunni
- Order: Chishti Nizami
- School: Hanafi

Muslim leader
- Predecessor: Khwaja Hasan Sani Nizami
- Successor: Syed Shaafi Nizami

After the death of his father, Mahdi Nizami, when Khwaja Syed Mohammad Nizami was around 18, he was guided towards Islamic mysticism by his uncle, Khwaja Hasan Sani Nizami. He had held the post of the head custodian of the dargah since 2015.

Known for his commitment to Sufism and love for Hindustani Ganga Jamunee Tahzeeb, Nizami was widely respected by followers and disciples from around the world.

He wanted to carry the family's legacy of peace and literature forward. He was the grandson of Khwaja Hasan Nizami, a Sufi saint and Urdu essayist, wrote extensively on the Indian freedom struggle.

On 7 February 2026, Nizami died from suffocation in a house fire caused by an electrical short circuit at his residence. He was succeeded by his two sons, Syed Shaafi Nizami and Syed Hasan Murtaza Nizami.

His death was mourned by different prominent leaders and politicians of India and was seen as a major loss to the global Sufi community and the Hindustan's Ganga Jamunee Tahzeeb.
