= Amjad Sabri =

Pakistani qawwali singer (1970–2016)

Amjad Sabri SI
- Born: 23 December 1976; Karachi, Sindh, Pakistan
- Died: 22 June 2016 (aged 39); Karachi, Sindh, Pakistan
- Cause of death: Gunshot wound
- Resting place: Paposh Nagar Graveyard, Karachi, Pakistan
- Occupations: Chorus singer (1992-1996); Lead Qawwali Singer (1996-2016)
- Years active: 1985-2016
- Children: 5 children - Mujadid (son), Awn (son), Muhib (son)
- Parent: Ghulam Farid Sabri (father)
- Relatives: Maqbool Ahmed Sabri (uncle)
- Musical career
- Genre: Sufi
- Instruments: Vocals; Harmonium; Tabla
- Formerly of: Sabri Brothers

Amjad Farid Sabri (Note: Urdu: امجد فرید صابری) (23 December 1976 – 22 June 2016) was a Pakistani qawwali singer and a proponent of the Sufi Muslim tradition. Amjad was a scion of the family of the Sabri Brothers; the son of Ghulam Farid Sabri and a nephew of Maqbool Ahmed Sabri, he emerged as one of South Asia's prominent qawwali singers. He was assassinated in Karachi in June 2016 by terrorists of the Tehrik-e-Taliban Pakistan (TTP). The TTP Hakimullah Mehsud group claimed responsibility, saying they had assassinated him "for blasphemy".

== Career ==
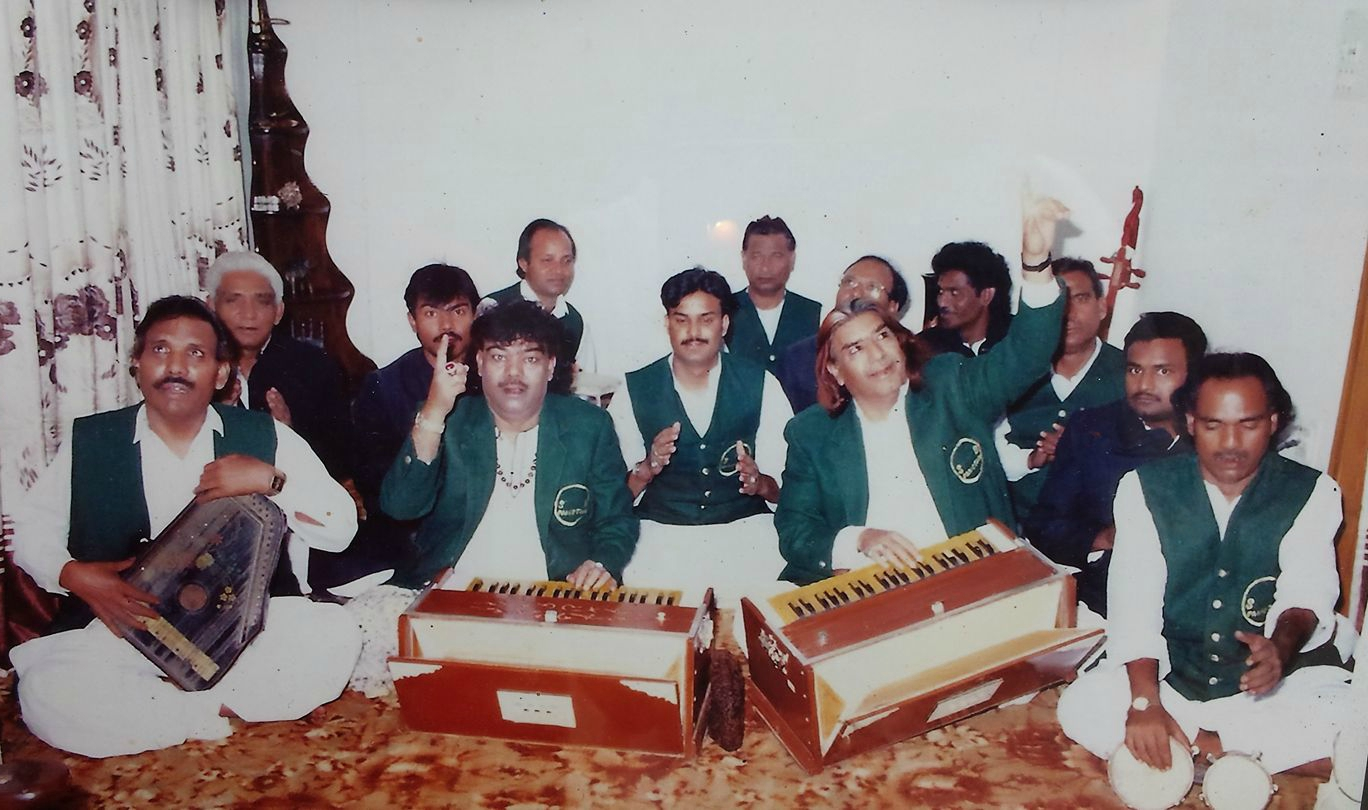
A very young Amjad Sabri seated between his father Ghulam Farid Sabri and uncle Maqbool Ahmed Sabri in The Sabri Brothers.

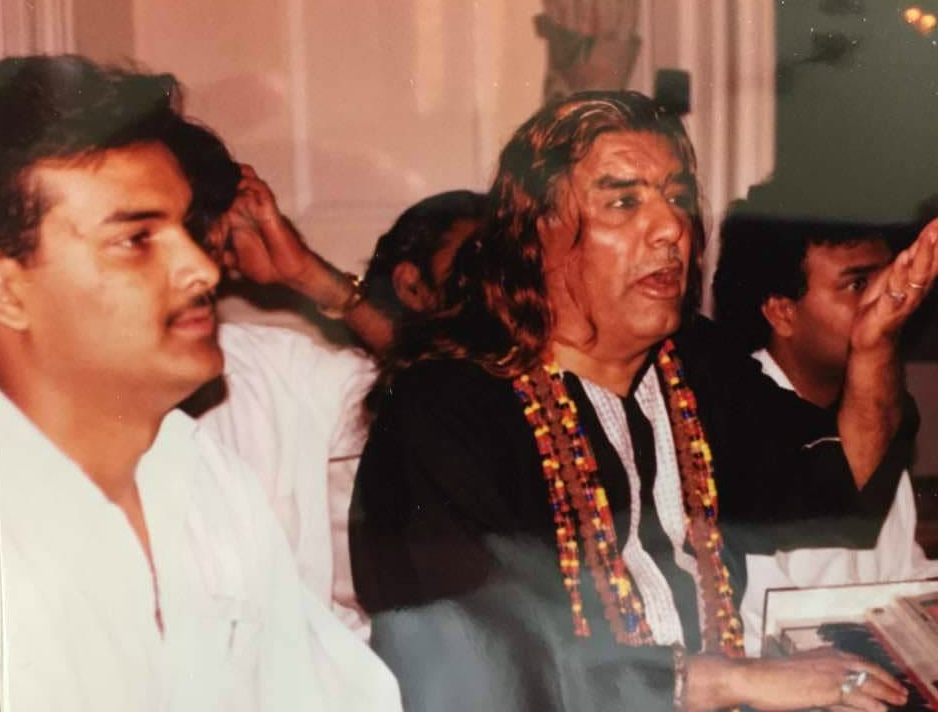
Amjad Sabri with his father Ghulam Farid Sabri.

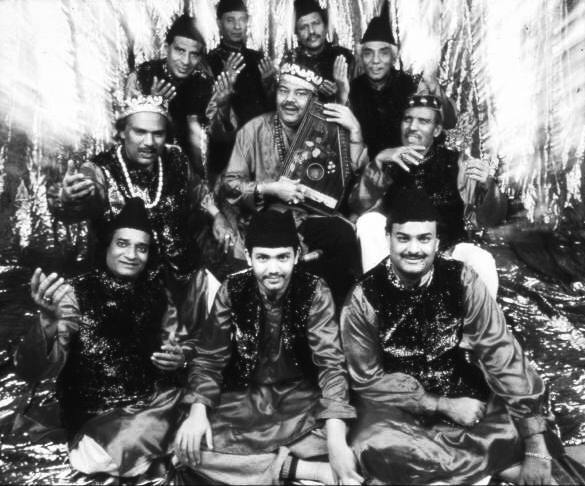
A young Amjad Sabri with The Sabri Brothers led by his uncle Maqbool Ahmed Sabri in New York, 1996.

Born in Karachi, Sindh, on 23 December 1970, Amjad began learning qawwali music from his father at age nine and joined his father on stage to perform in 1982. His father trained him in Raag Bhairon, which is practiced in early morning. For this training Sabri had to get out of bed in the middle of the night, then after performing tahajjud (a midnight prayer), he practiced the baja. Sabri sang the famous qawwalis of his family and travelled widely to India, America and Europe where he was known as the "rock star" of qawwali. At the time of his death, he was an acclaimed qawwali singers in the Indian subcontinent and performed around the world.

Amjad initially used to be in the chorus and would clap in his father's and uncle's band, the Sabri Brothers. He also appeared alongside his father Ghulam Farid Sabri and uncle Maqbool Ahmed Sabri at the age of 6 years old, along with the Sabri Brothers in Pakistani film Saharay which was released in 1982. In which his father and uncle recited their famous qawwali Tajdar-e-Haram. Amjad also recited Allama Iqbal's poem Lab Pe Aati Hai Dua in the same film. After his father's death, The Sabri Brothers were led by Amjad's uncle Maqbool Ahmed Sabri, Amjad took up the role of a supporting vocalist and also used to play the Bongos. Later, in 1996, he started his own group with his brothers and friends as members. His first album was Balaghal Ola Be Kamalehi which was released by Oriental Star Agencies in 1997 featuring his father's and uncle's qawwali Sar E La Makan Se Talab Hui as the main item. He mostly used to sing qawwalis sung by his father and uncle, then eventually began to include some of his own compositions. Some of his hit qawwalis included Ali Ke Sath Hai Zehra Ki Shaadi and Na Poochiye Ke Kya Hussain Hai. His most popular song is a Naat Karam Maangta Hoon.

His other works include Main Nazar Karoon Jaan E Jigar, Allah Allah, Dhoom Macha Do, Kaabe Ki Raunaq, Kaash Yeh Dua Meri, Ali Mera Dil, Phir Dikha De Haram, Tuloo E Saher Hai Shaam-E-Qalandar and his last Naat Aye Sabz Gumbad Wale. He also performed "More Haji Piya" song in the 2008 Hindi feature film Halla Bol.

Sabri's last musical project was with Coke Studio (Pakistan). He performed an outstanding qawwali, "Aaj Rang Hai" with Rahat Fateh Ali Khan in Episode 7 of Season 9. Sabri's performance on the platform turned out to be his first and last one at this studio.

== Personal life ==
Amjad Sabri is fondly remembered by friends and family as a warm and affable person who was always smiling, and had a love for board games and a childish tendency to play pranks. He married his wife Nadia after being introduced to her in 2002 through mutual friends. Nadia and Sabri have five children together. Sabri was known to be a family man who preferred to spend time with his wife and children despite his hectic career and travelling commitments and felt homesick when travelling abroad. Friends who knew him closely also considered him somewhat of an eccentric and an outspoken misfit. Sabri preferred to live in his humble Liaqatabad residence even after achieving world fame and refused to move to a more affluent area due to his spiritual association with the home built by his father.

== Death ==
On 22 June 2016, after finishing a morning TV show where his last naat included the words "When I shudder in my dark tomb, dear Prophet, look after me", two motorcyclists opened fire on Sabri's car in Liaquatabad Town, Karachi, critically injuring Sabri, an associate and his driver. Sabri was shot twice in the head and once on the ear. All of the car passengers were then shifted to Abbasi Shaheed Hospital where Sabri died. A relative of his, Saleem Sabri, was reported as injured and in critical condition. His assassination occurred near an underpass named after his father.

Tens of thousands of people attended Amjad Sabri's funeral in Karachi. He was buried near the graves of his father Ghulam Farid Sabri and uncle Maqbool Ahmed Sabri at Paposh Qabristan, in Nazimabad.

Sabri's murder was met with condemnation from many public figures in Pakistan and India, and several protests were organised against the killing.

=== Perpetrators ===
According to local Pakistani media like Dawn News, Tehrik-i-Taliban Pakistan (TTP) claimed responsibility for killing Amjad Sabri. The responsibility was claimed by the group's spokesman, Qari Saifullah Mehsud. Qari Saifullah Mehsud was later shot dead by an unknown gunman in Khost province of Afghanistan on 29 December 2019. Mehsud was a key TTP commander and was among the terrorists most wanted by Pakistan for his involvement in several terror attacks in the country. He was previously arrested by U.S. forces in Afghanistan in 2016 but was later released after he spent 14 weeks in jail in Afghanistan.

== Awards and recognition ==
- In 2018, Sabri was posthumously awarded the Sitara-i-Imtiaz – Pakistan's third highest civilian honour – by President Mamnoon Hussain.
- Amjad Sabri's voice featured in the track "Church" on Coldplay's 2019 album Everyday Life.

== Legacy ==
According to a major newspaper of Pakistan, "He lived a life above worldly emotions, and did not consider his contemporaries as rivals. When singer Atif Aslam showed interest in singing the famous Qawwali 'Tajdar-e-Haram', which was originally sung by Amjad's father, Amjad not only permitted it, but also praised Atif for delivering a powerful and befitting rendition".

National Public Radio's obituary for Amjad Sabri gives a summary definition of qawwali this way, "In South Asia, qawwali is also one of the most popular and relatable expressions of Islam and of Sufism - the hugely diverse, mystical branch of Islam that emphasizes having a personal connection to God, as well as embracing tolerance, peace and equality".
