= Mulla Wahidi =

Pakistani writer and journalist

- Born: Syed Muhammad Irtiza; 17 May 1888; Delhi, British India
- Died: 22 August 1976 (aged 88); Karachi, Pakistan
- Resting place: Paposh Nagar
- Writing career
- Language: Urdu

Mulla Wahidi (born Syed Muhammad Irtiza) was a Pakistani writer and journalist. Wahidi was the editor of Nizam-ul-Mashaikh – a journal published by Khwaja Hasan Nizami.

== Works ==
- Dilli Ka Phera
- Mera Afsana: Aap Biti
- Dilli Jo Ek Shehar Tha
