= All India Muslim Students Federation =

Student wing of All-India Muslim League

The All India Muslim Students Federation (AIMSF) was an Indian Muslim students union affiliated with the All-India Muslim League. Splitting off from the All India Students' Federation in 1937, the body was organised under patronage of Muhammad Ali Jinnah in 1941 by his sister Fatima Jinnah and became an important part of the Pakistan Movement.
