= Khwaja Hasan Sani Nizami =

Sufi Saint from Delhi

Personal life
- Born: Hasan Sani; Friday 15 May 1931 / Jumma 26 Zilhajj 1349 AH
- Died: March 15, 2015 (aged 83)
- Resting place: Khwaja Hall, Hazrat Nizamuddin, New Delhi, India

Religious life
- Religion: Islam
- Denomination: Sunni
- Order: Chishti Nizami
- School: Hanafi

Muslim leader
- Predecessor: Khwaja Hasan Nizami
- Successor: Syed Mohammad Nizami

Khwaja Hasan Sani Nizami (15 May 1931 – 15 March 2015) (birth name Khwaja Hasan Abu Talib Nizami) was a Sufi Shaykh of Nizami branch of Chishti Order and the former Sajjadanasheen (head caretaker) of Nizamuddin Auliya's shrine and considered as a prominent figure of Urdu literature. He was a member of United Nations Religious Initiatives, San Francisco of United States of America. He was the son of Khwaja Hasan Nizami and the master of Iqbal Ahmad Khan.

== Career ==
Khwaja received his primary education from his home and was later graduated from Jamia Millia Islamia.

Khwaja was a member of Delhi Urdu Academy, Ghalib Academy and Ghalib Institute, and was the Chairman of Ghalib Academy. He was also the founder-member of All India Sufi Conference, Hyderabad, secretary of Khwaja Hasan Nizami Memorial Society and member of National Ameer Khusro Society. Khwaja was also said to be the editor of "The Munadi" (monthly magazine) after his father Khwaja Hasan Nizami from 1955 onwards, which he continued publishing under his editorship from 1955 onwards.

Khwaja was fond of Qawwali, He used to organize various Qawwali programmes in Nizamuddin Auliya's shrine.

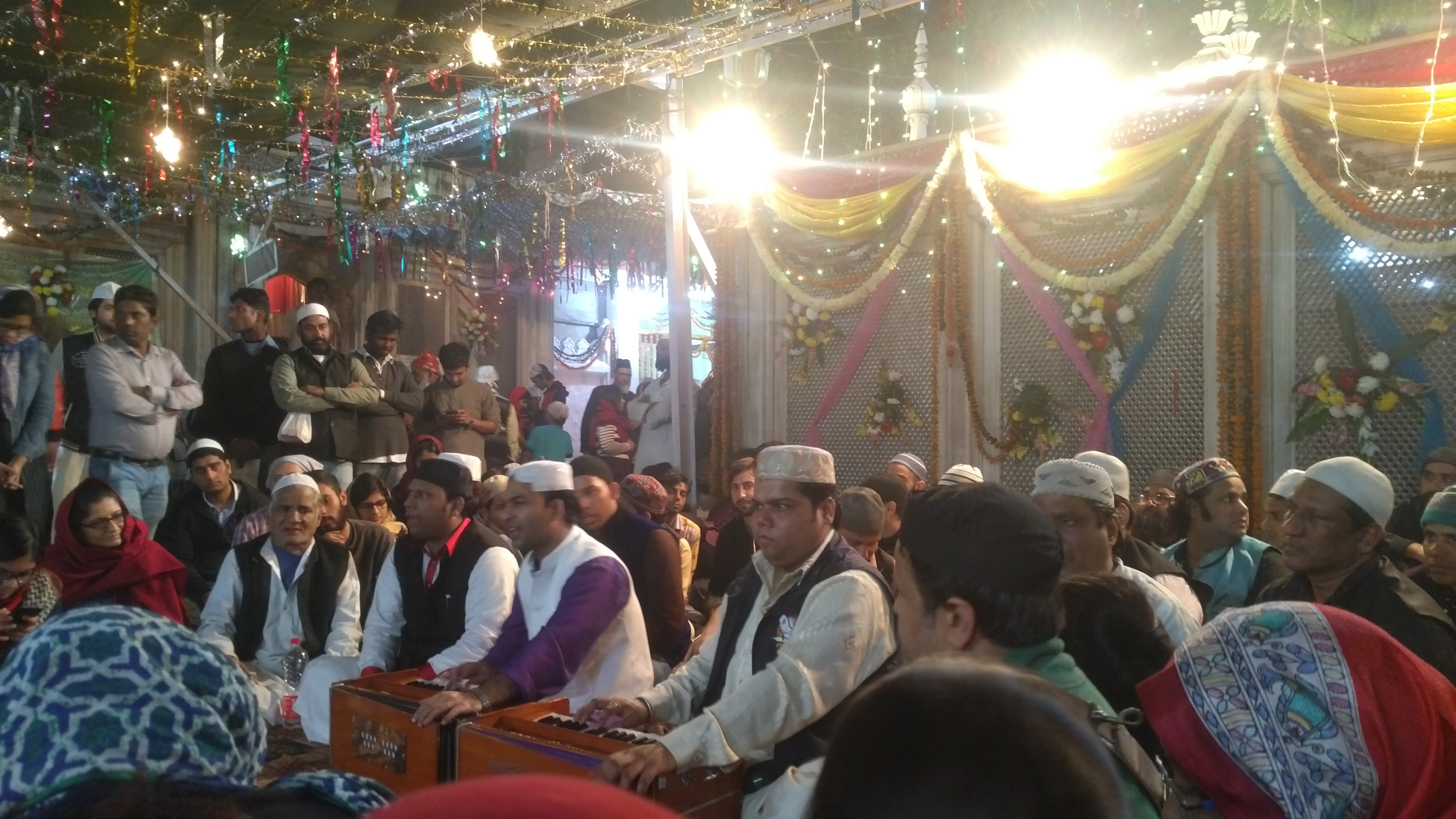
Qawwali at Hazrat Nizamuddin Auliya's shrine

Khwaja was one of the Islamic leader who condemned Taliban as 'out of Islam' organization in 2006.

== Literary works ==
Khwaja not only authored various books, but also translated, edited, and republished a wide range of literary works originally written by his father, Khwaja Hasan Nizami, and other Sufi scholars, which include:

- Tarjuma E Quran E Majid
- Fawaidul Fawaad (Urdu Tarjuma)
- Tasawwuf (Rasm Aur Haqeeqath)
- Tazkira E Nizami
- Tazkira E Khusravi
- Nizami Bansari
- A'mal e Hizbul Bahar
- Begamaat ke aansu (editor)
- Munadi, New Delhi (editor)

== Awards and legacy ==
Khwaja received Delhi Gaurav award from Indian Government under prime minister ship of Atal Bihari Vajpayee.

In 2017, Urdu Academy organized an evening in the memory of Khwaja Hasan Sani Nizami at Kashmiri gate.

Books based on life and achievements of Khwaja Hasan Sani Nizami, was released by Mohammad Hamid Ansari in the month of April 2017.

Khwaja's family members were working as the Sajjada Nashin of Hazrat Nizamuddin Auliya's shrine from the era of Prithviraj Chauhan.

Khwaja Hasan Sani Nizami was widely recognized as an authoritative source on Delhi's history, culture, and civic lineage, a status attained through his mastery and comprehensive knowledge that led to his popular identification as the "Encyclopedia of Delhi."

Ultimately, in March 2015, Khwaja's soul united with Allah after prolonged heart disease and diabetes, leaving behind his nephew as his successor Khwaja Syed Mohammad Nizami

Khwaja's funeral prayer was performed twice, one was by the Imam of Khilji Masjid of Nizamuddin Auliya's shrine and another by his disciple Syed Rashid Nizami
