= Satyameva Jayate (2018 film) =

2018 Indian film by Milap Zaveri

- Theatrical release poster
- Directed by: Milap Zaveri
- Written by: Milap Zaveri
- Produced by: Bhushan Kumar; Krishan Kumar; Monisha Advani; Madhu Bhojwani; Nikkhil Advani
- Starring: John Abraham; Manoj Bajpayee; Aisha Sharma; Amruta Khanvilkar
- Cinematography: Nigam Bomzan
- Edited by: Maahir Zaveri
- Music by: Songs: Sajid–Wajid; Tanishk Bagchi; Rochak Kohli; Arko Pravo Mukherjee; Score: Sanjoy Chowdhury
- Production companies: T-Series Films; Emmay Entertainment
- Release date: 15 August 2018; (India)
- Running time: 140 minutes
- Country: India
- Language: Hindi
- Budget: ₹38 crore
- Box office: est. ₹110 crore

Satyameva Jayate (transl. Truth alone triumphs) is a 2018 Indian Hindi-language vigilante action thriller film directed by Milap Zaveri, produced and distributed by T-Series. The film stars John Abraham and Manoj Bajpayee in their second collaboration after Shootout at Wadala, alongside Aisha Sharma, Amruta Khanvilkar and Manish Chaudhari.

Principal photography began on 5 March 2018.

Satyameva Jayate was released on 15 August 2018, coinciding with India's Independence Day, and received mixed reviews from critics. The film broke various opening day records for an A-rated film and emerged as one of the highest-grossing Hindi films of the year by grossing ₹1.10 billion (US$11 million) worldwide. A sequel titled Satyameva Jayate 2 was released in 2021.

== Plot ==
Virendra "Vir" Rathod, a painter, kills corrupt cops by setting them on fire and wins public support for wiping out the corrupt cops without revealing his identity. Worried by the rising burnt and terrified cops, Commissioner Manish Shukla summons DCP Shivansh Rathod to hunt down the killer. Using a voice altering application, Vir calls Shivansh and threatens to kill a corrupt officer.

Shivansh gets tricked into believing a police station would be targeted, while Vir fights off and kills the targeted corrupt cop at a gas station. Shivansh begins investigating and discovers the killing pattern to be as per the acronym Satyameva Jayate and the next target to be from a station beginning with the letter Y. Shivansh and his team locate the station and begin surveillance as they wait for the killer. Vir, disguised as a cop, enters the police station and sets a corrupt cop on fire for torturing an innocent person.

Vir manages to flee and meets Shivansh at his home, where it is revealed that Shivansh and Vir are brothers. Vir and Shivansh visit a hospital, where the burnt officer is admitted. An enraged Vir secretly enters the room and kills the officer by setting him on fire again. Vir returns to the bathroom, injures himself and pretends to be attacked by the killer from behind. Later, Shivansh gathers all the corrupt cops at a safe house, but Vir manages to burn them down and proceeds to take Shikha on a date, which gives him an alibi for a day. Later, Vir, covering himself in blood, kills a corrupt cop during Ashura, following which Shivansh chases after him and Shivansh explains that Vir's paintings of terrorized men, which resembled the dead cops, made him realize that Vir is the killer.

Vir manages to escape again and captures Shikha as she is revealed to be Shukla's daughter. Vir calls Shukla and Shivansh, where he makes Shukla pour kerosene on himself. Vir reveals that Shukla was responsible for the death of their father Inspector Shiv Rathod as Shiv didn't allow anyone in the police force to bribe. Vir decides to surrender before Shukla summons his army of cops to eliminate the brothers.

Vir kills the cops and corners Shukla and Shivansh reluctantly shoots Vir is furious Shivansh before he can kill Shukla. Realizing the kerosene poured on Shukla's body is still fresh and finding a match lying near his father's medal that reads Satyameva Jayate, a wounded Vir kills Shukla by setting him on fire. Shivansh and Shikha approach Vir, who asks Shivansh to recite the oath that Shiv taught them. The brothers recite it together and Vir dies in Shivansh's arms.

== Cast ==
- John Abraham as Virendra "Vir" Rathod, Shivansh younger brother, Sarita younger brother in law
- Manoj Bajpayee as Deputy Commissioner Of Police Officer Shivansh Rathod, Sarita's Husband, Vir's elder brother
- Aisha Sharma as Dr. Shikha Shukla, Vir's love interest
- Amruta Khanvilkar as Sarita Rathod, Shivansh's Wife, Vir's elder sister in law
- Manish Chaudhari as Commissioner Manish Kumar Shukla, Shikha's father and the main antagonist
- Sandeep Yadav as Minister
- Nora Fatehi in a special appearance in the song "Dilbar"
- Devdatta Nage as Inspector Shankar Gaikwad (cameo appearance)
- Chetan Pandit as Inspector Shiv Rathod, Shivansh & Vir's father (cameo appearance)
- Ganesh Yadav as Inspector Damle (cameo appearance)
- Aditi Sanwal as Girl in Car (cameo appearance)
- Rajesh Khera as Inspector Satish Bhosle (cameo appearance)

== Release ==
The film was released on 15 August 2018 to coincide with Indian Independence Day. The film was released along with Akshay Kumar's Gold. It was released on 2500 screens in India.

Upon release the songs "Paniyon Sa" and "Tajdar E Haram" both became hits, whereas "Dilbar" became the blockbuster song of the year.

== Soundtrack ==
Satyameva Jayate

Soundtrack album by Sajid–Wajid, Tanishk Bagchi, Rochak Kohli and Arko Pravo Mukherjee
- Released: 1 August 2018
- Recorded: 2018
- Genre: Feature film soundtrack
- Length: 15:40
- Language: Hindi
- Label: T-Series

Official audio
- Full Album: SATYAMEVA JAYATE on YouTube

Tanishk Bagchi chronology
Gold (2018)	Satyameva Jayate (2018)	Loveyatri (2018)

Rochak Kohli chronology
Sonu Ke Titu Ki Sweety (2018)	Satyameva Jayate (2018)	Ek Ladki Ko Dekha Toh Aisa Laga (2019)

Arko Pravo Mukherjee chronology
Gold (2018)	Satyameva Jayate (2018)	Jack and Dil (2018)

Sajid–Wajid chronology
3 Dev (2018)	Satyameva Jayate (2018)	Bhaiaji Superhit (2018)

Singles from Satyameva Jayate
- 1. "Dilbar (song)" Released: 4 July 2018; 2. "Paniyon Sa" Released: 12 July 2018; 3. "Tajdar-e-Haram" Released: 26 July 2018; 4. "Tere Jaisa" Released: 1 August 2018

The music for the film is composed by Sajid–Wajid, Tanishk Bagchi, Rochak Kohli and Arko Pravo Mukherjee while lyrics are penned by Shabbir Ahmed, Kumaar, Arko Pravo Mukherjee, Danish Sabri and Ikka. The background score is composed by Sanjoy Chowdhury.

The first song of the film, "Dilbar" from the 1999 film Sirf Tum originally sung by Alka Yagnik and composed by Nadeem-Shravan has been recreated for this film by Tanishk Bagchi in the voices of Neha Kakkar, Dhvani Bhanushali and Ikka. It was released on 4 July 2018. Reinvisioned with Middle-Eastern musical influences, and with its music video featuring Nora Fatehi performing belly dancing, the song became popular with all versions of the song (including an Arabic-language version) having received more than 1 billion views on YouTube.

The second song of the film titled as "Paniyon Sa," which is sung by Atif Aslam and Tulsi Kumar was released on 12 July 2018. The third song of the film to be released was "Tajdar-e-Haram", a Qawwali which was originally composed and sung by Sabri Brothers, is re – created and sung by Wajid Khan, on 26 July 2018. The fourth and the last song, "Tere Jaisa," sung by Arko Pravo Mukherjee and Tulsi Kumar, was released on 1 August 2018. The soundtrack was released by T-Series on 1 August 2018.

Track listing
No.	Title	Lyrics	Music	Singer(s)	Length
1.	"Dilbar"	Sameer Anjaan, Shabbir Ahmed, Ikka	Tanishk Bagchi, Nadeem-Shravan	Neha Kakkar, Dhvani Bhanushali, Ikka, Alka Yagnik	3:04
2.	"Paniyon Sa"	Kumaar	Rochak Kohli	Atif Aslam, Tulsi Kumar	3:56
3.	"Tajdar-e-Haram"	Danish Sabri	Sajid–Wajid	Wajid Khan	4:51
4.	"Tere Jaisa"	Arko	Arko	Arko, Tulsi Kumar	3:49
Total length:					15:40

== Box office ==
Satyameva Jayate earned ₹205.2 million net in India on its opening day, thus setting the records of the highest opening day collection for John Abraham and the fifth highest opener film of 2018 after Sanju, Race 3, Gold and Baaghi 2. In the next four days, it collected ₹79.2 million, ₹90.3 million, ₹9.18 crore and ₹10.26 crore net in India respectively, taking total opening extended weekend gross collection at ₹569.1 million.

The lifetime collection of the film in India gross is ₹1,082.1 million including a nett total collection of ₹887.2 million. It grossed ₹146.9 million at the overseas box office in its full run.

Satyameva Jayate's worldwide gross stands at ₹1.08 billion

== Sequel ==
A sequel Satyameva Jayate 2 was made with John Abraham and Divya Khosla Kumar playing lead roles, and directed by Milap Milan Zaveri. It was delayed because of COVID-19, and released on 25 November 2021. Unlike the original, it was a major commercial failure.

Zaveri also announced the third part Satyameva Jayate 3 before the second and final was released but third part is cancelled.

== Critical reception ==
- Times of India
- On review aggregator Rotten Tomatoes, it holds a rating of 17%, based on 12 reviews with an average rating of 3.4/10.
