= Quraish Pur =

Pakistani writer

- Born: Zulqarnain Qureshi; 1932; Bhopal, British India
- Died: 5 August 2013 (aged 81); Karachi, Pakistan
- Occupation: TV Quiz show host
- Employer: Pakistan Television (1973 – 1992)

Quraish Pur, born Zulqarnain Qureshi (1932 – 5 August 2013) was a scholar, writer, novelist, columnist and media expert of Pakistan. He gained fame when hosting the TV program Kasuti (PTV) in the 1970s with Obaidullah Baig.

== Career and legacy ==
Quraish Pur joined PTV in 1973 and worked there in various positions including the hosting of some shows until 1992, when retired.

== TV Shows hosted ==
- Kasauti (1967 – 1972) - a quizz TV show with 20 questions (reruns of this TV show were shown in the 1990s)
- Lafz ki Talaash
- Sheeshay Ka Ghar
- Zauq-e-Aagahi
- UN Quiz

== Death ==
He died on 5 August 2013 in Karachi after a protracted illness. His burial took place at the Paposh Nagar Graveyard in Karachi, Pakistan.
