= Aisha Sharma =

Indian actress and model (born 1992)

- Born: 25 January 1992 (age 34); Bhagalpur, Bihar, India
- Occupations: Actress,Model,Author
- Years active: 2016–Present
- Parent: Ajit Sharma (father)
- Relatives: Neha Sharma (elder sister)

Aisha Sharma (pronounced [aːiːʂɦaː ˈʃərma], born 25 January 1992) is an Indian actress and model. She made her first screen appearance in Ayushmann Khurrana's music video "Ik Vaari". Sharma later debuted in film with a role in the Hindi action thriller Satyamev Jayate alongside John Abraham and Manoj Bajpayee.

== Early life ==
Sharma did her graduation in engineering from the college in Noida, Uttar Pradesh. She started her career as a model while studying and went on to become a face for many popular brands including Lakmé, Pepsi and Campus shoes. In 2016, she was featured as one of the Kingfisher Calendar Girls.

== Filmography ==
Year	Title	Role	Language	Notes	Ref.
2018	Satyameva Jayate	Dr. Shikha Shukla	Hindi	Debut film	

=== Web series ===
Year	Name	Character	Platform	Ref.
2022	Shining with the Sharmas	Herself	Social Swag	

=== Music Videos ===
Year	Song	Singer	Ref.
2016	Ik Vaari	Ayushmann Khurrana	
2022	Kudiyan Lahore Diyan	Hardy Sandhu	
2022	Rangrez	Arjun Kanungo	
2023	Tera Hoke Nachda Phira	Stebin Ben	

== See also ==
- List of people from Bihar
- List of Indian film actresses
- List of Hindi film actresses
