= Gangaa Jamunaa Saraswati =

Gangaa Jamunaa Saraswathi
- Theatrical Poster
- Directed by: Manmohan Desai
- Written by: Kader Khan; Anil Nagrath; Sohel Don (dialogues)
- Screenplay by: K. K. Shukla
- Story by: Prayag Raj
- Produced by: S. Ramanathan
- Starring: Amitabh Bachchan; Meenakshi Sheshadri; Jaya Prada; Mithun Chakraborty; Nirupa Roy; Amrish Puri
- Cinematography: Pravin Bhatt
- Edited by: Raju Kapadia; Mangal Mistry
- Music by: Anu Malik
- Production company: Raasi Kalamandir
- Release date: 23 December 1988
- Running time: 187 minutes
- Country: India
- Language: Hindi

Gangaa Jamunaa Saraswathi is 1988 Indian Hindi-language romantic action film directed by Manmohan Desai, produced by S. Ramanathan and starring Amitabh Bachchan as Ganga, Meenakshi Sheshadri as Jamuna, Jaya Prada as Saraswati. Supporting cast includes Mithun Chakraborty, Nirupa Roy, Amrish Puri.

The movie was released on 23 December 1988 to excellent collections which subsequently dropped following negative reviews it received. India Today in January 1989 reported that by the second week collections in the Mumbai area were ranging between 28 and 40% resulting in the film being declared a box office disaster, despite being the 9th highest-grossing film of 1988. It however performed financially well when in its reruns during the 90s but still generating a loss but this time the loss percentage was less.

== Plot ==
Thakur Hansraj is a greedy man who kills his brother-in-law, gets the signature of his sister Bharati on the property papers under a false pretext and takes control of her property. Bharati's son Ganga who has taken a pledge to avenge the wrong done to his family, becomes a truck driver.

One day, a girl, Jamuna jumps into his truck to save herself from a goon. Ganga is forced to stop the truck due to a road block. When it starts raining, Ganga ends up going to a nearby lodge to take shelter, pretending he and Jamuna are a couple. The next day, when the goon returns to take Jamuna away forcibly, Ganga gets into a fight with him. Ganga is arrested for beating up the Thakur's son and jailed for two years.

When he returns, the Thakur sends his aides to kill him. A blast takes place at the bridge and Jamuna falls into the river along with her child. Ganga saves his child but cannot find Jamuna. Jamuna, who loses her memory from the fall, ends up reaching the home of singer Shankar who recognizes her from a qawwali performance she had performed and falls in love with her. Ganga takes help from another woman, Saraswati to take care of his son and she ends up falling in love with him.

The remainder of the movie deals with how Ganga and Jamuna reunite by the roles played by Saraswati and Shankar, and of course, Ganga's mission to exact revenge on his uncle.

== Cast ==
- Amitabh Bachchan as Ganga Prasad
- Meenakshi Sheshadri as Jamuna
- Jaya Prada as Saraswati
- Mithun Chakraborty as Shankar Qawwal
- Nirupa Roy as Bharati Devi
- Amrish Puri as Thakur Hansraj Singh
- Mahesh Anand as Shakti Bhindu
- Goga Kapoor as Inspector Goga
- Aruna Irani as Jamuna's Aunty
- Bharat Bhushan as Pandit (Shankar's Father)
- Trilok Kapoor as Thakur Chicha Prasad 'Chichaji (Ganga's Father)
- Chandrashekhar as Police Commissioner Surinder
- Mukri as Manager of Honeymoon Lodge Shambhu Prasad
- Murad as Judge Rathore
- Dev Kumar as Zalim, Hansraj's goon
- Jack Gaud as Bheema
- Bhushan Tiwari as Jagga
- Joginder as Ranga

== Music ==
The music director for the film was Anu Malik and the lyricist was Indeevar and Prayag Raj, The song "Tere Dar Ko Chhod Chale" was originally sung by Maqbool Ahmed Sabri who was uncredited for the song, and was later re-recorded in the voice of Pankaj Udhas

Track listing (Original Motion Picture Soundtrack)

Song	Singer
"Ek Ek Ho Jaaye, Phir Ghar Chale Jaana"	Kishore Kumar, Pankaj Udhas
"Ganga Aaja"	Lata Mangeshkar
"Naachegi Saraswati"	Lata Mangeshkar
"Pati Parmeshwar Ke Siva"	Lata Mangeshkar
"Saajan Mera Us Paar Hai"	Lata Mangeshkar
"Tere Dar Ko Chhod Chale"	Pankaj Udhas
"Tere Dar Ko Chhod Chale"	Maqbool Ahmed Sabri
"Disco Bhangra"	Mohammed Aziz
"Chudiya Khanki"	Sadhana Sargam
"Ganga Jamuna Saraswati"	Suresh Wadkar
