= Maqbool Ahmed Sabri =

Pakistani Qawwali singer (1945–2011)

"Shahenshah-e-Qawwali" Maqbool Ahmed Sabri Pride of Performance
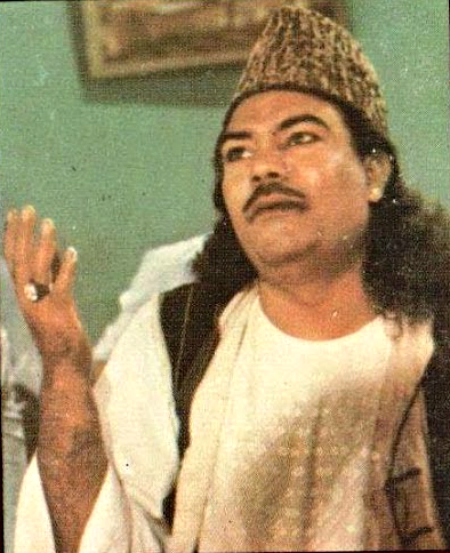

Background information
- Born: 12 October 1945; Kalyana, Punjab Province, British India (now in Haryana, India)
- Died: 21 September 2011 (aged 65) Cape Town, South Africa
- Genres: Qawwali, Ghazal, Sufi music
- Instruments: Vocals, harmonium, Music Director
- Years active: 1955 – 2011

Maqbool Ahmed Sabri (12 October 1945 – 21 September 2011) was a Pakistani qawwali singer and a prominent member of the Sabri Brothers, one of the greatest qawwali groups of all time. The Sabri Brothers were honoured with the Pride of Performance award by the President of Pakistan in 1978.

== Early life ==
Born in Kalyana in eastern Punjab, Maqbool Ahmed Sabri was initially educated in the Hindustani classical music tradition by his father Ustad Inayat Hussain Sabri and his beloved elder brother Ghulam Farid Sabri. Their family came from a musical background, and claimed direct descent from Mian Tansen, who had played at the court of the 16th-century Mughal emperor Akbar. Mehboob Baksh Ranji Ali Rang, his paternal grandfather, was a master musician of his time; Baqar Hussein Khan, his maternal grandfather, was a unique sitarist. His family belongs to the Sabriyya order of Sufism, hence the surname Sabri. The family made the perilous journey to Karachi during the partition of India in 1947, though Maqbool Sabri was almost left behind and rejoined the family party only when a servant found him still in the house – he had to run to catch up, clutching one of his instruments. Maqbool Ahmed Sabri initially learnt music from his father and his elder brother Ghulam Farid Sabri. Later, Maqbool and his elder brothers Ghulam Farid Sabri and Kamal Ahmed Sabri furthered their knowledge of music under Ustad Fatehdin Khan, Ustad Ramzan Khan, Ustad Kallan Khan, Ustad Latafat Hussein Khan Rampuri, and their spiritual master Hazrat Hairat Ali Shah Warsi.

== Career ==
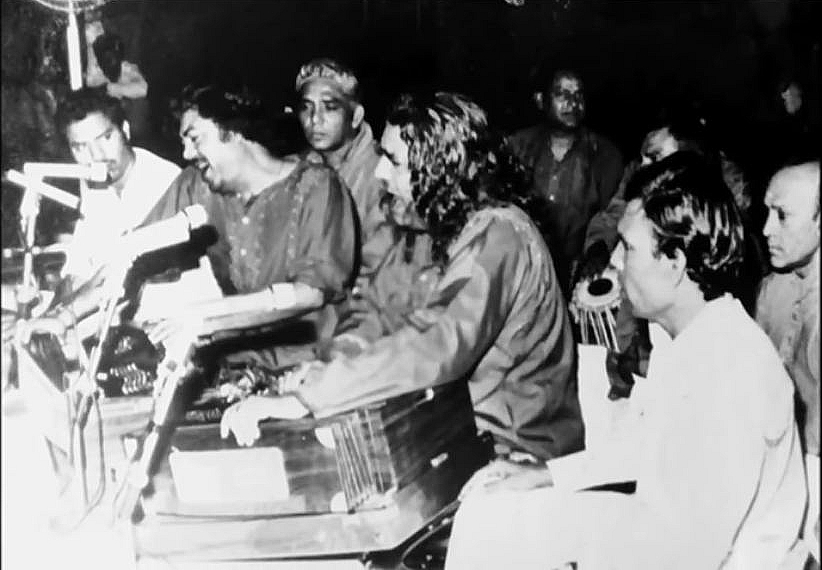
Ghulam Farid Sabri, Maqbool Ahmed Sabri, Kamal Ahmed Sabri, & Mehmood Ghaznavi Sabri performing as The Sabri Brothers in India, 1977

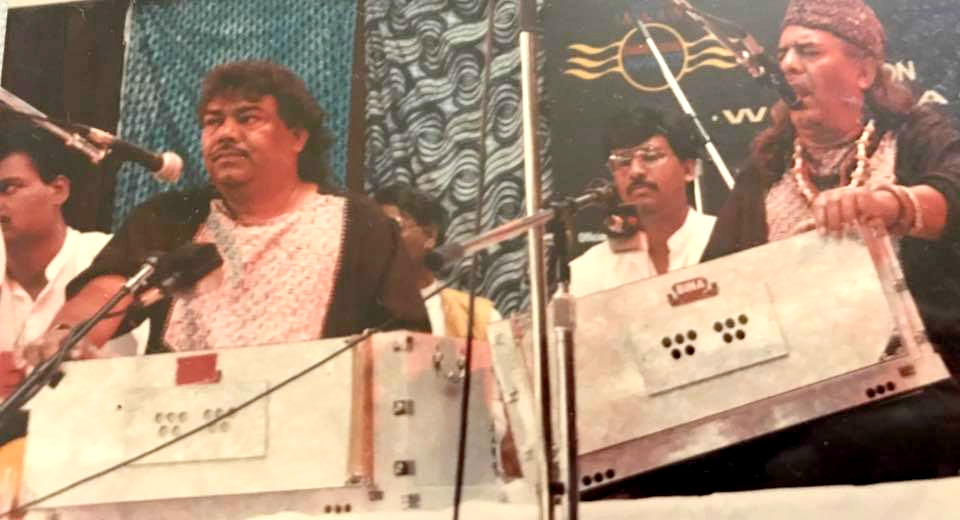
Ghulam Farid Sabri & Maqbool Ahmed Sabri leading The Sabri Brothers at the WOMAD Festival, 1989

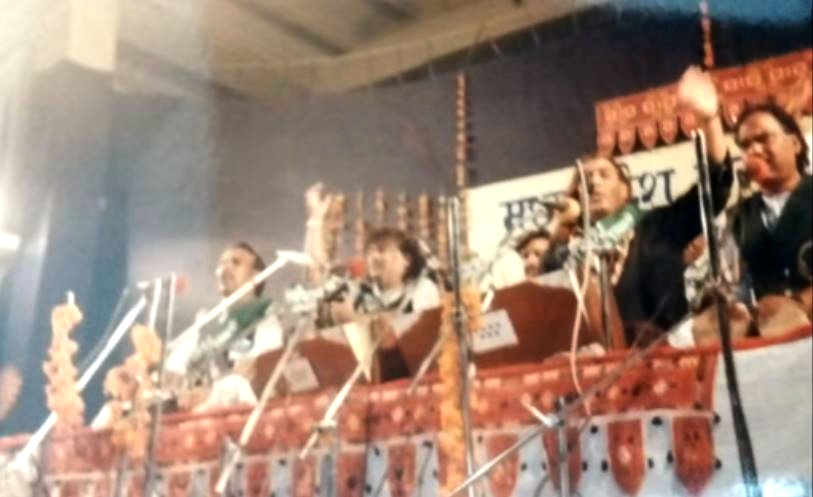
Sabri Brothers performing at SAARC Festival concert held in Bhopal, 1992

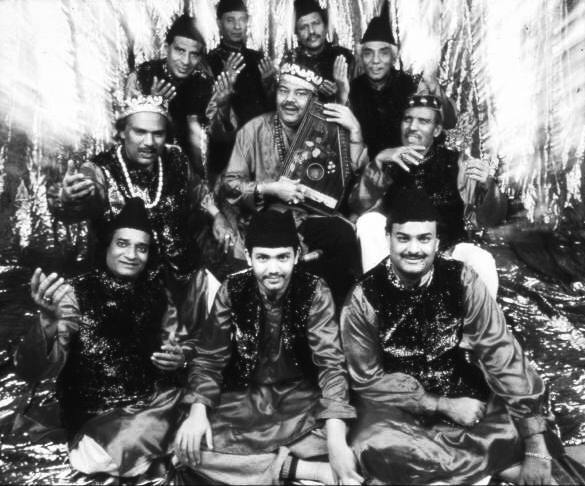
The Sabri Brothers led by Maqbool Ahmed Sabri in New York, 1996

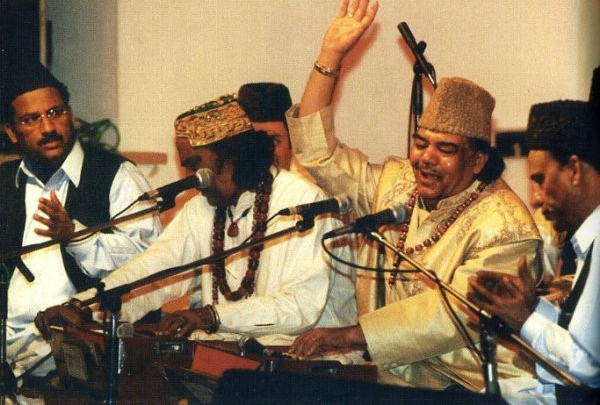
Maqbool Ahmed Sabri & Mehmood Ghaznavi Sabri leading The Sabri Brothers in Moscow, 2001

Maqbool Ahmed Sabri showed musical talent from a young age, which was noticed by his school teacher who later asked Maqbool Ahmed Sabri's father to further instruct him and guide him in the field of music. In 1955, when Maqbool Ahmed Sabri was eleven years old, his brother-in-law got him a job singing at a theater in Karachi where he gave his first public performance and received a lot of appreciation from the audience by singing old Hindi film songs. Later, Maqbool Ahmed Sabri decided to quit his job as some other performers of the theater started to develop jealousy from his success. Later, with the help of his father, Maqbool Ahmed Sabri formed a qawwali group at the age of eleven and named it Bacha Qawwal Party. The group's first public performance was in 1956 at an Urs ceremony held at the home of Jameel Amrohi, where he sang "Do Alam Baka Kul Giraftar Daari" in the presence of many legendary qawwals of that time. Soon afterwards, his elder brother Ghulam Farid Sabri, who was then performing as a supporting lead in Ustad Kallan Khan's qawwali group, joined him after their father's insistence and became the leader of the party, which soon came to be known as Ghulam Farid Sabri and Party, later as Ghulam Farid Sabri Maqbool Ahmed Sabri Qawwal & Party. During their first ever tour of America in 1975, their promoter Beate Gordon of Asia Society suggested that this name was too long so they changed it as Sabri Brothers.

Their first recording, released in 1958 under the EMI Pakistan label, was the Urdu qawwali, "Mera Koi Nahin Hai Teray Siwa." Their blockbuster hits included "Bhar Do Jholi Meri Ya Muhammad", "Tajdar-e-Haram", "O Sharabi Chord De Peena", "Khwaja Ki Deewani", and "Sar E La Makan Se Talab Hui." They sang many qawwalis in Persian like "Nami Danam Che Manzil Boodh" and "Chashm-e-Mast-e-Ajabe" by Amir Khusro and "Man Kunto Maula" and "Rang" by Amir Khusro. They also sang a kalaam by Imam Ahmed Raza Khan which is in four languages—Arabic, Persian, Urdu, and Hindi. The kalaam is "Lam Yaati Nazeeruka Fee Nazarin."

Maqbool Ahmed Sabri was considered a master of improvisational wordplay, often making references in Urdu and Punjabi, as well as Persian or Arabic, to historical events or to traditional poetry. Sabri was considered to be one of the best classical singers. He also sang ghazal which included "Tere Ghungroo Toot Gaye", "Aa Jan-e-Wafa", "Kabhi Tanha Beith Ke", "Gul Badan Gul Pairhan", "Jab Kabhi Aankh Milate Hain", "Din Ek Sitam", "Mere Mizaj Ki Awargi" and "Aaina Tordh Diya."

Maqbool Ahmed Sabri was also a poet who wrote famous qawwalis which included "Koi Mujhse Pooche Mai Kya Chahta Hoon, Madine Mei Thodi Jagah Chahta Hoo" and "Ajmer Ko Jaana Hai."

== Qawwalis featured in films ==
Several of their qawwalis have featured in films. "Mera Koi Nahin Hai Teray Siwa" appeared in the 1965 film Ishq-e-Habib, "Mohabbat Karne Walo Hum Mohabbat Iss Ko Kehtain Hain" in the 1970 film Chand Suraj, "Aaye Hain Tere Dar Pe" in the 1972 film Ilzam, "Bhar Do Johli Meri Ya Muhammad" in the 1975 film Bin Badal Barsaat, "Teri Nazr-e-Karam" in the 1976 film Sachaii, "Tajdar-e-Haram" in the 1982 film Sahaaray, "Mamoor Horha Hai" in the 1977 film Dayar-e-Paighambran and "Aftab-e-Risalat" in the 1977 Indian film Sultan-e-Hind, and "Tere Dar Ko Chord Chale" in the 1988 Indian film Gangaa Jamunaa Saraswathi, a solo ghazal sung by Sabri.

== Foreign concerts ==
The Sabri Brothers are the only qawwali troupe with "first class" status on the Pakistan Television Corporation. Sabri Brothers has toured Europe, Asia and the Middle East. In 1970, the government of Pakistan sent them to Nepal as representatives for the royal wedding. They became the first ever qawwali artist to introduce qawwali music to America and other Western Countries, when they performed at New York's Carnegie Hall in 1975. In 1975, they performed in the United States and Canada under the auspices of the Performing Arts Program of The Asia Society. In April 1978, the album Qawwali was recorded in the United States while the Sabri Brothers were on tour. The New York Times review described the album as "the aural equivalent of dancing dervishes" and the "music of feeling."

In June 1981, they performed at the Royal Tropical Institute in Amsterdam. They played the Womad festival in the UK in 1989 – one of a series of appearances there – and released the album Ya Habib (O Beloved) on Peter Gabriel's Real World Records label the following year. In 1996, after the death of his brother Ghulam, Sabri performed at the Brooklyn Academy of Music – Next Wave Festival, as part of a double-billing with alternate-rockers Cornershop., and the Voices Of God event in 1999 held at Marrakesh.

== Personal life ==
In the 1960s Maqbool Ahmed Sabri took allegiance to the Warsi order of Sufisim along with his most loved companion and elder brother Ghulam Farid Sabri, on the hands of Hazrat Ambar Ali Shah Warsi, Their mother was a disciple of Hazrat Hairat Shah Warsi; the spiritual master of Hazrat Ambar Ali Shah Warsi. After the death of his elder brother Ghulam Farid Sabri in 1994, Maqbool Ahmed Sabri was deeply saddened and often remembered Ghulam Farid Sabri during his performances after the latter's death. Maqbool Ahmed Sabri married twice; he did not have any children with his first wife. His first wife died during his lifetime. In 1977, Maqbool Ahmed Sabri was married for the second time to an Indian woman named Fatima residing in South Africa. He is survived by his wife Fatima, a son, Shumail, and his daughters, Ameema Shah, Gulerukh, Kanza and Tunanza.

== Death ==
Maqbool Ahmed Sabri was treated in a hospital in South Africa for two months because he was suffering from heart problems and diabetes. He died in South Africa on Wednesday 21 September 2011 due to cardiac arrest. He was buried near his brother Ghulam Farid Sabri's grave.

His legacy was carried on by his younger brother Mehmood Ghaznavi Sabri, who led Sabri Brothers after the deaths of Ghulam Farid Sabri and Maqbool Ahmed Sabri. Amjad Sabri, son of Ghulam Farid Sabri, also inherited the qawwali heritage of Sabri Brothers and performed in his own separate group.

On 22 June 2016, during Ramdan, his nephew Amjad Farid Sabri was shot dead in Liaquatabad, Karachi, Pakistan. Amjad Sabri was buried near his grave.

On 27 May 2020, his elder brother Ghulam Farid Sabri's wife died.

On 21 June 2021, Maqbool Ahmed Sabri's younger brother Mehmood Ghaznavi Sabri died in Karachi and was buried inside their mother's grave, making it now a double-storey grave which is located nearby the graves of Ghulam Farid Sabri, Maqbool Ahmed Sabri, and Amjad Sabri.

== Awards and recognition ==
- Pride of Performance Award by the President of Pakistan in 1978 to the entire Sabri Brothers group.
- Spirit of Detroit Award by the federal government of the United States to both Ghulam and Maqbool Sabri in 1981.
- Khusro Rang to both Ghulam and Maqbool Sabri by the Raag Rang Society of India in 1980.
- Bulbul E Pak O Hind by President of India and President of Pakistan at the shrine of Nizamuddin Auliya to Ghulam and Maqbool Sabri in 1977.
- Charles de Gaulle Award by Charles de Gaulle to Ghulam and Maqbool Sabri in 1983.
- A doctorate degree was awarded to the Sabri Brothers as an honor for their hit record Shikwa Jawab E Shikwa (Of Allama Iqbal) by the University of Oxford.
- Tansen Samman (India) was awarded to Maqbool Ahmed Sabri in 2005 by the government of Madhya Pradesh, India.

== See also ==
- Sabri Brothers
- Ghulam Farid Sabri
- Amjad Sabri
- List of Pakistani musicians
