= Kalyana =

Neighbourhood in Karachi, Pakistan

Kalyana (Urdu: کلیانہ) is a neighborhood in the Central Karachi district of Karachi, Sindh. Kalyana is one of the thirteen union councils of New Karachi Town. In 2006 it had an estimated population of 47,313.

== Neighborhood demographics ==
Kalyana is composed of primarily the following ethnicities.

1. Pakhtuns
2. Muhajirs
3. Panjabis
4. Siraikis
5. Kashmiris
