= Ghulam Farid Sabri =

"Shahenshah-e-Qawwali" Ghulam Farid Sabri Pride of Performance
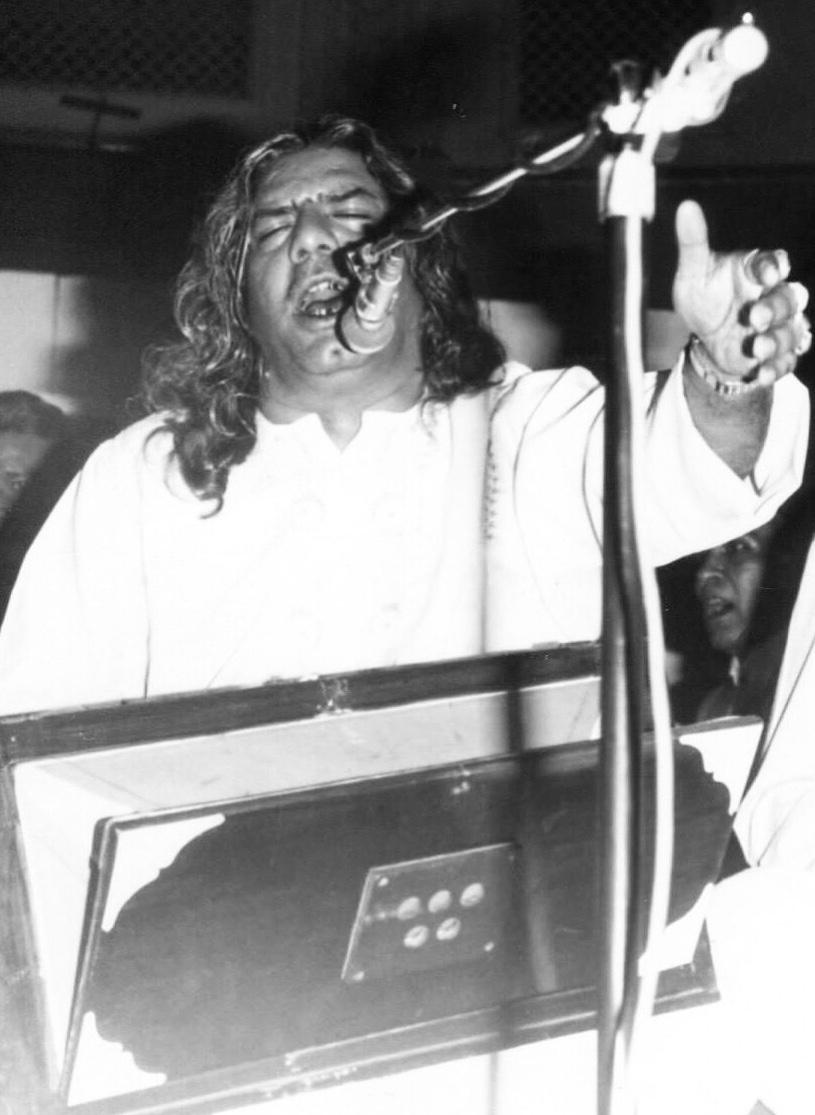

Background information
- Born: 1930; Kalyana, Punjab, British India
- Died: 5 April 1994 (aged 63–64) Karachi, Sindh, Pakistan
- Genres: Qawwali, Ghazal, Sufi music
- Instruments: Vocals, harmonium
- Years active: 1946–1994
- Title: Hazrat Aalam Shah Warsi
- Awards: Pride of Performance in 1978

Ghulam Farid Sabri (1930–5 April 1994) was a qawwali singer and member of the Sabri Brothers, a qawwali group in Pakistan in the 1970s, 1980s, and 1990s. The Sabri Brothers were awarded the Pride of Performance by the President of Pakistan in 1978. Sabri was also a Sufi mystic connected to the Chishti Order.

== Early life ==
Ghulam Farid Sabri was born in Kalyana, a village in the district of Rohtak in Punjab, British India, in 1930. His family's musical lineage stretches back several centuries, to the Mughal Empire. His family claims direct descent from Mian Tansen, the musician of the court of Akbar the Great, the Mughal emperor. Mehboob Baksh Ranji Ali Rang, his paternal grandfather, was a musician; Baqar Hussein Khan, his maternal grandfather, was a sitarist. His family belongs to the Sabriyya order of Sufism; hence, they adopted the surname Sabri.

Ghulam Farid Sabri was raised in Gwalior, in British India. In his youth, he wanted to turn away from the world and live in the wilderness; his mother's stern rebuke turned him back to his responsibilities. At the age of six, Ghulam Farid Sabri's formal instruction in music commenced under the guidance of his father, Inayat Hussain Sabri. He was instructed in North Indian classical music and qawwali. He was also instructed in the playing of the harmonium and tabla. Before starting to learn music, Ghulam Farid Sabri along with his father visited the shrine of Sufi saint Khwaja Ghaus Muhammad Gwaliori in Gwalior to seek blessings.

Ghulam Farid Sabri initially learnt music from his father and many other musical teachers (Ustad) in Gwalior. Later, he and his younger brothers Maqbool Ahmed Sabri and Kamaal Ahmed Sabri furthered their knowledge of music under Ustad Fatehdin Khan, Ustad Ramzan Khan, Ustad Kallan Khan, Ustad Latafat Hussein Khan Rampuri, and their spiritual master Hazrat Hairat Ali Shah Warsi.

== Migration to Pakistan ==
Following the independence of Pakistan in 1947, his family was uprooted from their native town and transported to a refugee camp in Karachi, Pakistan. Conditions in the camp were woeful, food was scarce and expensive, and the rewards for hard work were barely enough to sustain life. Malnutrition was rife and brought with it tuberculosis and dysentery. Sabri found employment carrying bundles of bricks for the government house building or breaking rocks to build roads. At night, almost single-handedly, he built his own brick house to shelter his family. Eventually, he became ill. Worn out, he was told by a physician that due to the condition of his lungs, he would never again have the strength to sing. In despair, he went to his father for advice, and the advice he was given was uncompromisingly tough. Every night for the next two years, he would have to sit in the middle of the camp for four to five hours making zikr. All those days he bore the scars of beatings with wood sticks and stones thrown by his tired, sleepless neighbours and brawls he was in, when they were determined to stop him, but he would not be deterred, and, as time went by, his lungs grew stronger and his magnificent voice was formed. Soon, Sabri started to mix with a small group of people who appreciated qawwali.

== Career ==
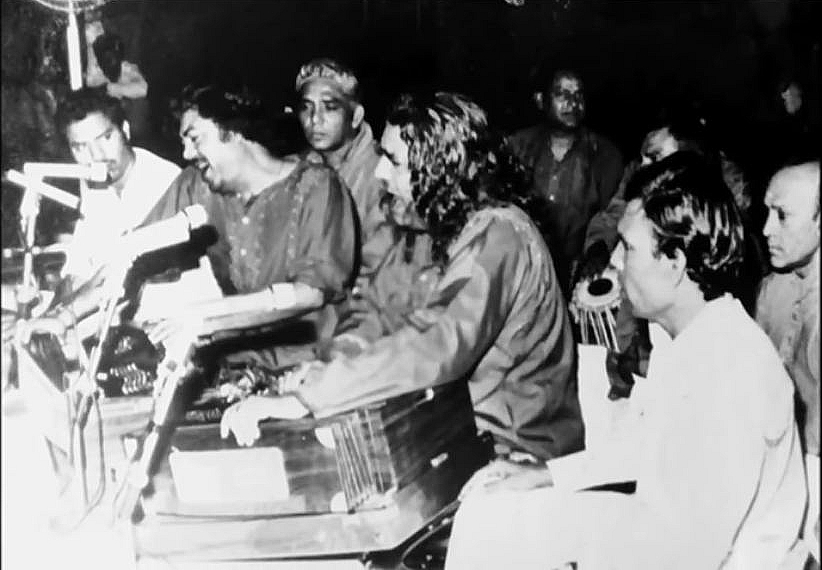
Ghulam Farid Sabri along with his brothers Maqbool Ahmed Sabri, Kamal Ahmed Sabri, & Mehmood Ghaznavi Sabri Performing As Sabri Brothers In India, 1977

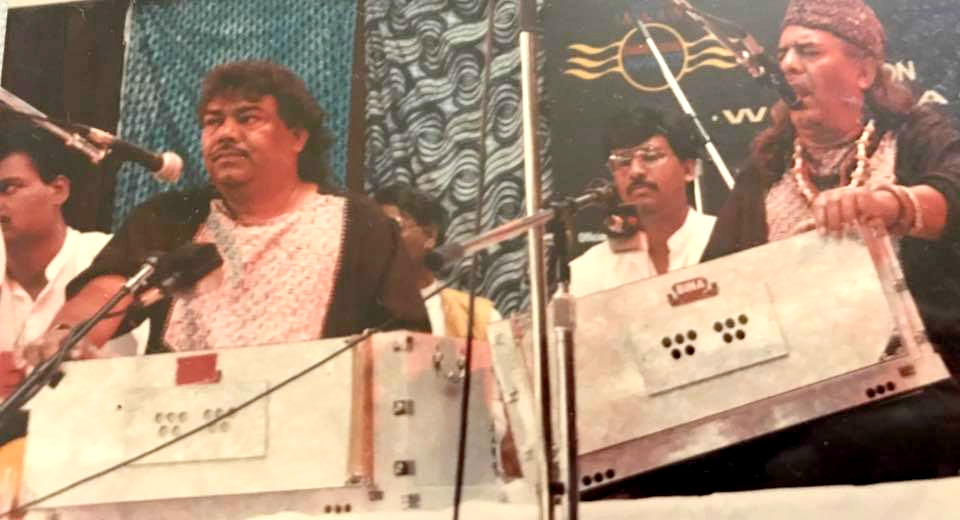
Ghulam Farid Sabri & Maqbool Ahmed Sabri performing at The WOMAD Festival in 1989

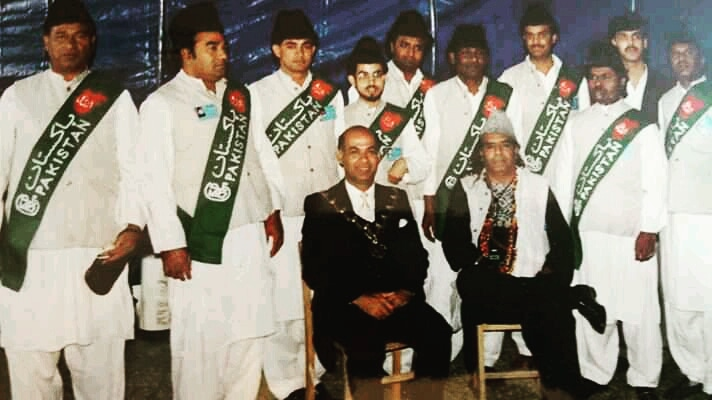
Ghulam Farid Sabri Leading The Sabri Brothers in Nottingham, 1991

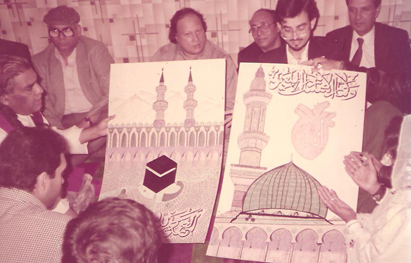
Ghulam Farid Sabri with Nusrat Fateh Ali Khan

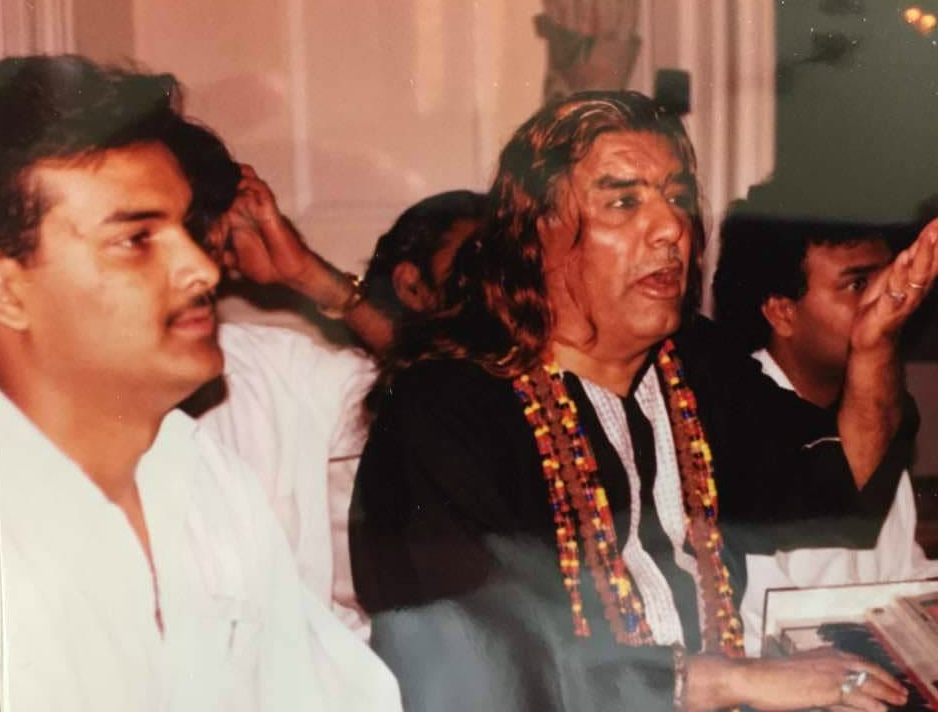
Ghulam Farid Sabri performing Qawwali with his son Amjad Sabri

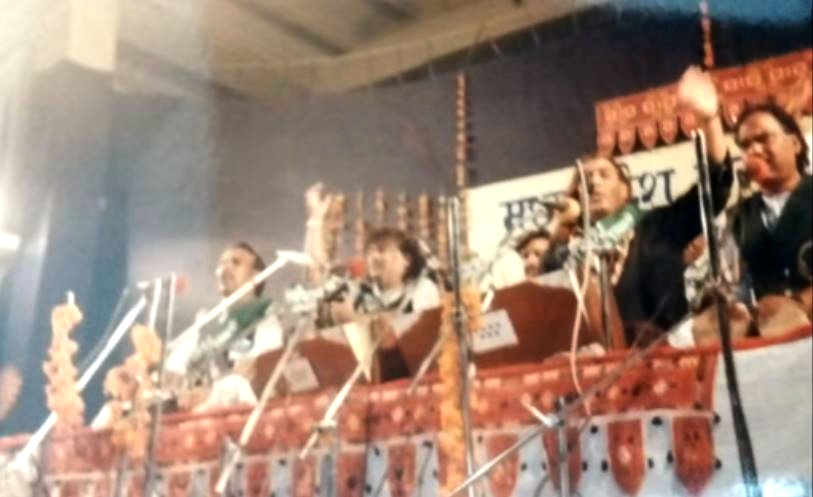
Sabri Brothers performing at SAARC Festival concert Held in Bhopal, 1992

Ghulam Farid Sabri's first public performance was at the annual Urs festival of the Sufi saint Mubarak Shah Sahab in Kalyana in 1946. Before his family migrated to Pakistan in 1947, he had joined Ustad Kallan Khan's qawwali party in India. In Pakistan, a wealthy businessman approached him and offered him a partnership in a nightclub, yet Sabri's reply was that he only wanted to sing qawwali, and he rejected the offer. Later in 1956, Sabri joined his younger brother Maqbool's qawwali ensemble which was earlier known as Bacha Qawwal Party. After Sabri joined and became the leader of the group, they were initially known as Ghulam Farid Sabri Qawwal & Party as Maqbool withdrew his name due to love and respect for his brother. Later, after insistence from his well-wishers, Maqbool gave his name as a co-lead singer of the ensemble and they started to become known as Ghulam Farid Sabri - Maqbool Ahmed Sabri Qawwal & Party. Later the group became known as the Sabri Brothers. They became widely acclaimed for their singing. Their first recording, released in 1958 under the EMI Pakistan label, was a popular hit called "Mera Koi Nahi Hai Tere Siwa." Their qawwalis are still very popular worldwide. Their greatest hit qawwalis include "Bhar Do Jholi Meri Ya Muhammad", "Tajdar-e-Haram", "O Sharabi Chore De Peena", "Khwaja Ki Deewani", and "Sar-e-La Makan Se Talab Hui." They have sung many qawwalis in Persian like "Nami Danam Che Manzil Boodh", "Chashm-e-Mast-e-Ajabe", etc. by Amir Khusro and also "Man Kunto Maula" and "Rang" by Amir Khusro. They have also sung a kalaam by Imam Ahmed Raza Khan which is in four languages—Arabic, Persian, Urdu, and Hindi.

Ghulam Farid Sabri was also a poet and wrote some famous qawwalis which were sung by him and his brothers, including "Aawe Mahi" and "Auliyao'n Ke Maula Imam Aaye Hai."

== Personal life ==
Ghulam Farid Sabri loved his younger brother Maqbool Ahmed Sabri the most among all his companions as they spent most of their time together. Sabri was married to Asghari Begum around the age of 18. He was survived by his wife, five sons, Sarwat Farid Sabri, Azmat Farid Sabri, Amjad Farid Sabri, Asmat Farid Sabri, Talha Farid Sabri, and six daughters. Sabri possessed a deep and powerful voice and presented wajad energy during his performances. He was acknowledged as a deeply religious man, yet a warm, simple man with a great sense of humour, who was devoted to his family and friends. Shortly before his death, he began growing a beard. Ghulam Farid Sabri had been initiated into the Warsiyya order of Sufism by Hazrat Ambar Ali Shah Warsi. The name bestowed upon Sabri was Alam Shah Warsi.

Ghulam Farid Sabri lived in the heavily congested and overpopulated Pakistani suburb of Liaquatabad, Karachi. At night, he used to lay on his bed listening to the sounds of surrounding lanes and alleyways. His sleep was minimal and his night was filled with constant zikr, made using his 1000-bead tasbih. He wore this tasbih around his neck during recordings and live performances.

Ghulam Farid Sabri initiated his sons into classical music at a young age. One of his younger sons, Amjad Farid Sabri, once recalled: "The hardest part was being awakened at 4:00 AM. Most riyaz is done in Raag Bhairon and this is an early morning raag. My mother would urge our father to let us sleep but he would still wake us up. Even if we had slept after midnight, he would get us out of bed, instruct us to make wuzu, perform tahajjud prayers, and then take out the baja. And he was correct in doing so because if a raag is rendered at the correct time, the performer himself enjoys it to the fullest".

== Death ==
The night before he died, Ghulam Farid Sabri and the Sabri Brothers were about to tour Germany later that week. His appearances in Britain and the United States set a pattern and began to build an audience for what has now come to be known as world music. Ghulam Farid Sabri died on 5 April 1994 in Liaquatabad, Karachi following a massive heart attack. He died en route to a hospital and beside him was his beloved younger brother, Maqbool. His funeral was attended by approximately 40,000 mourners. He was buried at Paposh Qabristan, in nearby Nazimabad. His modest white grave is situated near his father's grave. His legacy was carried on by his younger brothers Maqbool Ahmed Sabri, Mehmood Ghaznavi Sabri, and Kamal Ahmed Sabri, who performed as the leading and senior members of the Sabri Brothers after his death. Later, Sabri's son Amjad Sabri also helped carry on his legacy and the qawwali tradition while other students and relatives also inherit his legacy by performing qawwali.

On 21 September 2011, his younger brother Maqbool Ahmed Sabri died due to cardiac arrest and was buried near his grave.

On 22 June 2016, during Ramadan, his son Amjad Sabri was shot dead in Karachi, and was buried near his grave.

On 3 October 2018, his son Azmat Farid Sabri died.

On 27 May 2020, his wife Asghari Begum died.

On 21 June 2021, his youngest brother Mehmood Ghaznavi Sabri died in Karachi and was buried inside their mother's grave, making it now a double-storey grave which is located nearby the graves of Ghulam Farid Sabri, Maqbool Ahmed Sabri, and Amjad Sabri.

== Qawwalis featured in films ==
Several of their qawwalis were featured in films:

- "Mera Koi Nahi Hai Tere Siwa" appeared in the 1965 Pakistani film Ishq-e-Habib
- "Mohabbat Karne Walo Hum Mohabbat Iss Ko Kehte Hai" in the 1970 Pakistani film Chand Suraj
- "Aaye Hai Tere Dar Pe Toh Kuch Le Ke Jayen Ge" in the 1972 Pakistani film Ilzam
- "Baba Farid Sarkar" in the 1974 Pakistani Punjabi film Sasta Khoon Mehenga Paani
- "Bhar Do Jholi Meri Ya Muhammad" in the 1975 Pakistani film Bin Badal Barsaat
- "Teri Nazr-e-Karam" in the 1976 Pakistani film Sachaii
- "Mamoor Ho Raha Hai" in the 1977 Pakistani film Dayar-e-Paighambran
- "Aftab E Risalat" in the 1979 Indian Hindi film Sultan-e-Hind Khwaja Garib Nawaz (RA)
- "Tajdar-e-Haram" in the 1982 Pakistani film Sahaaray

== Awards and recognition ==
- Pride of Performance (Tamgha E Husn E Kaarkardagi) Award by the President of Pakistan in 1978 to the whole Sabri Brothers group.
- Spirit of Detroit Award by the federal government of the United States to both Ghulam and Maqbool Sabri in 1981.
- Khusro Rang to both Ghulam and Maqbool Sabri by the Raag Rang Society of India in 1980.
- Bulbul E Pak O Hind by the Shrine of Nizamuddin Auliya to Ghulam and Maqbool Sabri in 1977.
- Charles de Gaulle Award by Charles de Gaulle to Ghulam and Maqbool Sabri in 1983.
- A doctorate degree was awarded to the Sabri Brothers as an honor for their hit record Shikwa Jawab E Shikwa (Of Allama Iqbal) by the University of Oxford.
