= Tajdar-e-Haram =

Qawwali performed by Sabri Brothers

Song by Sabri Brothers
- Language: Urdu, Persian, Arabic
- Released: 1970
- Genre: Qawwali, Classical
- Length: 27:06
- Label: EMI Pakistan
- Composer: Maqbool Ahmed Sabri
- Lyricists: Hakim Mirza, Habib Madni, & Others

"Tajdar-e-Haram" (Urdu: تاجدارِ حرم, lit. 'King of the Holy Sanctuary') is a qawwali in praise of the Prophet Muhammad performed by the Pakistani musical group, Sabri Brothers.

== 1982 version ==
"Tajdar-e-Haram"

Song by Sabri Brothers

from the album Sahaaray
- Language: Urdu
- Released: 1982
- Genre: Qawwali
- Length: 8:53
- Songwriter: Sabri Brothers
- Composer: Sabri Brothers

In 1982, the Sabri Brothers recorded this qawwali for Pakistani film Sahaaray.

== 2015 version ==
"Tajdar-e-Haram"

Single by Atif Aslam

from the album Coke Studio S8E1
- Language: Urdu
- Released: 15 August 2015
- Studio: Coke Studio
- Genre: Pop
- Length: 10:28 (Video); 10:16 (Audio)
- Label: Coke Studio
- Songwriters: Mirza Muhammad Hakim and Sabri Brothers
- Composers: Baber Ali Khanna and Arslan Rabbani
- Producers: Coca-Cola and Shiraz Uppal

Music video
- "Tajdar-e-Haram" on YouTube

In 2015, it was rendered by Atif Aslam, during Coke Studio season 8 episode 1. It was considered to be produced by Strings. Atif Aslam revealed that the track was produced by Shiraz Uppal. This was a tribute by Atif to the Sabri Brothers' rendition of the qawwali singing praise of the prophet of Islam.

=== Credits ===
- Artist – Atif Aslam
- Guest Musician – Tanveer Tafu (Rubab), Arsalan Rabbani (Harmonium)
- Humnawa – Jamshed Ali Sabri, Naveed Ali Sabri, Mohammad Shan, Zahid Akhtar
- Houseband – Complete (except Aahad)

=== Popularity ===
The music video features Atif Aslam. It is the first Pakistani music video to cross 100 million views on YouTube. The official video has garnered over 520 million views on YouTube, and became the most viewed Youtube video of Pakistani-origin, as of January 2022, leaving behind Rahat Fateh Ali Khan and Momina Mustehsan's rendition of Afreen Afreen having 336 million views. It has received over 5 million engagements and has been viewed in 186 countries worldwide.

=== Reception ===
Amjad Sabri the son of Ghulam Farid Sabri said, "I really like how the music was arranged. Atif didn't do badly. I wish he could have worked on his diction a little more, as long as the essence remains untouched, there is no harm." He further said, "it was an honest accolade to his father and uncle". British High Commissioner Christian Turner took to Twitter that his friend suggested him "Tajdar-e-Haram" by Atif Aslam and he thoroughly enjoyed it. In return, Atif also thanked him.

== 2018 version ==
"Tajdar-e-Haram"

Song by Wajid Khan

from the album Film Satyameva Jayate
- Language: Urdu
- Released: 16 July 2018
- Genre: Pop
- Length: 2:05 (video); 5:10 (audio)
- Label: T-Series
- Composer: Sajid–Wajid
- Lyricist: Danish Sabri
- Producer: Bhushan Kumar
External videos
- Tajdar-e-Haram (video) on YouTube
- Tajdar-e-Haram (lyrical) on YouTube

In 2018 Bollywood film Satyameva Jayate, it was recreated by Sajid–Wajid and sung by Wajid from the same duo. It released on 16 July 2018.

=== Credits ===
- Singer – Wajid
- Music – Sajid – Wajid
- Lyrics By – Danish Sabri
- Theme Designed And Arranged By – Sajid Wajid
- Song Programmed By – Aditya Dev
- Sajid Wajid's Assistant – Ashish Sehgal & Rahul Kothari
- Mix Assistant Engineers – Michael Edwin Pillai
- Song Mixed And Mastered By Eric Pillai (Future Sound Of Bombay)

=== Critical reception ===
The song received negative reviews. It was not liked by audience. The filmmakers were criticized for making such song. It was said to be disaster, disrespectful and blasphemous.

== Version listings ==
1975 version
No.	Title	Length
1.	"Tajdar-e-Haram"	27:06

1982 version
No.	Title	Length
1.	"Tajdar-e-Haram"	8:53

2015 version
No.	Title	Length
1.	"Tajdar-e-Haram"	10:28

2018 version
No.	Title	Length
1.	"Tajdar-e-Haram"	5:10

== Summary of versions ==
Country	Year	Film/Album	Genre	Language(s)	Length	Singer	Label	Ref(s).
Pakistan	1970	Single	Qawwali	Urdu	27:06	Sabri Brothers	EMI Pakistan	
Pakistan	1982	Sahaaray	Qawwali	Urdu	8:53	Sabri Brothers	N/A	
Pakistan	2015	Coke Studio S8E1	Pop	Urdu, Arabic, Persian, Braj	10:28	Atif Aslam	Coke Studio	
India	2018	Satyameva Jayate	Pop	Urdu	5:10	Wajid Khan	T-Series	

== See also ==
- Afreen Afreen
- Tera Woh Pyar
- Atif Aslam discography
- Coke Studio (Pakistani season 8)
