= Paposh Nagar =

Neighbourhood residential locality in Karachi, Pakistan

Coordinates: 24°55′N 67°01′E

Paposh Nagar پاپوش نگر
- Neighbourhood
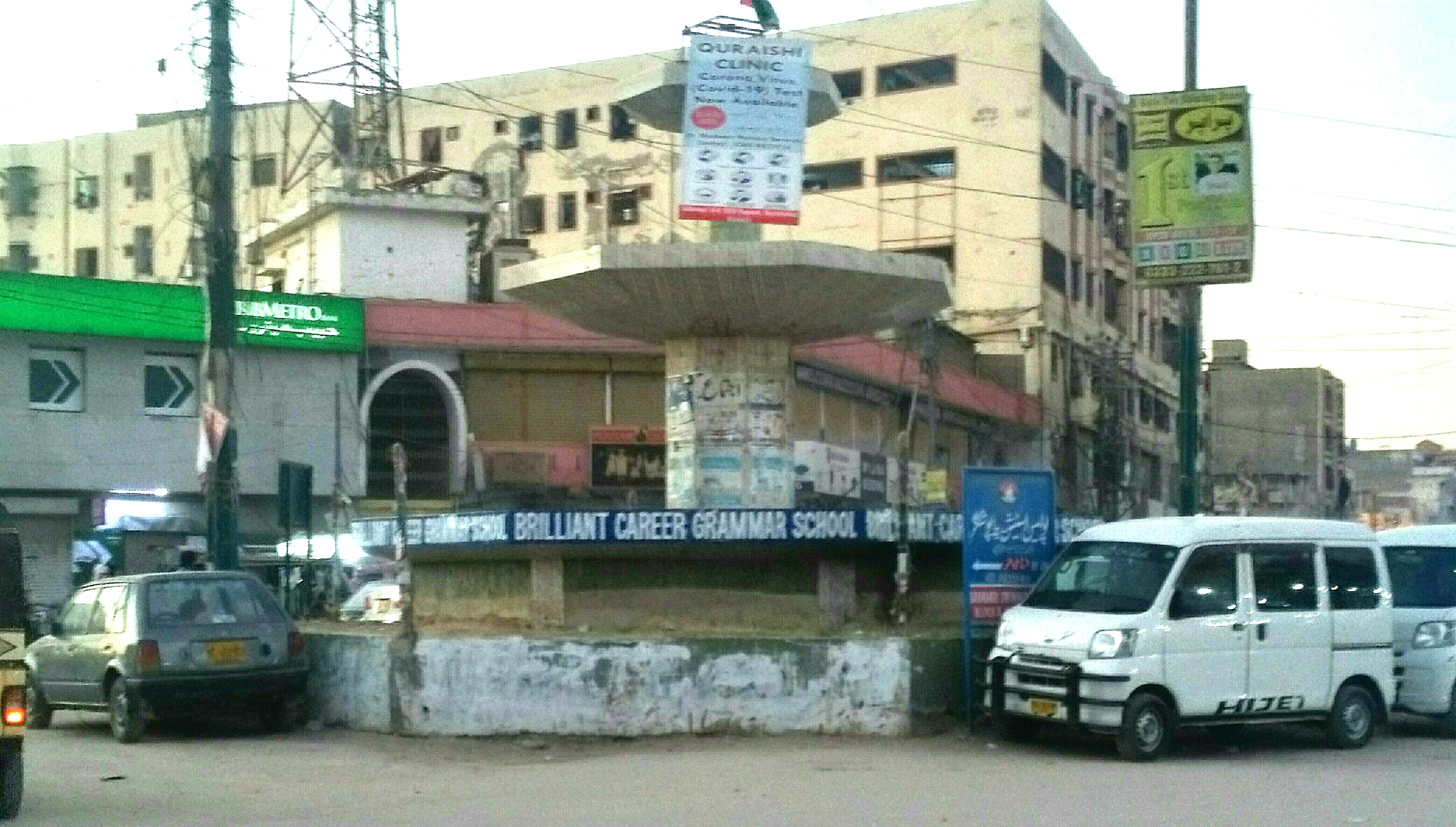
- Paposh Nagar, Karachi
- Interactive map of Paposh Nagar پاپوش نگر
- Country: Pakistan
- Province: Sindh
- City: Karachi
- District: Karachi Central
- Town: Nazimabad

Government
  - Type: Union Council
  - Chairman: Muhammad Iqbal (JI)
  - Vice Chairman: Aftab Hameed (JI)
- Time zone: UTC+5 (PST)
- Postal code: 75300
- Graveyard: Paposh Nagar Graveyard

Paposh Nagar or Paposhnagar (Urdu: پاپوش نگر) is a neighborhood in the Karachi Central district of Karachi, Pakistan.

The majority of the population is of Muhajirs.

== Etymology ==
The etymology of Paposhnagar is that the words (Pa means foot; posh means to wear; nagar means town') due to footwear and leather workshops and boutiques in the 1950-1970s.

After the construction of the Abbasi Shaheed Hospital, this area slowly became identified with the hospital.

Most of the footwear workshops have moved to other industrial and commercial areas of Karachi meanwhile some small business related to footwear business still have workshops in Chandni Chowk area. Majority of the people in this middle-class neighbourhood are Muhajirs who settled after the independence of Pakistan. The area was beautifully designed, with at least one central park, mosque and children playground and was linked with the rest of the city with Orangi railway station from where commuters can travel to westbound S.I.T.E. and eastbound towards the Karachi airport.

== In popular culture ==
- In 2021, Express Entertainment released a serial titled as "Paposh Nagar Ki Neelam" depicting story of a girl from the neighborhood of Paposh Nagar.

== See also ==
- Abbasi Shaheed
- Abbasi Shaheed Hospital
- North Nazimabad Town
- Nazimabad
