= Khwaja Hasan Nizami =

Indian Sufi saint and writer (1878–1955)

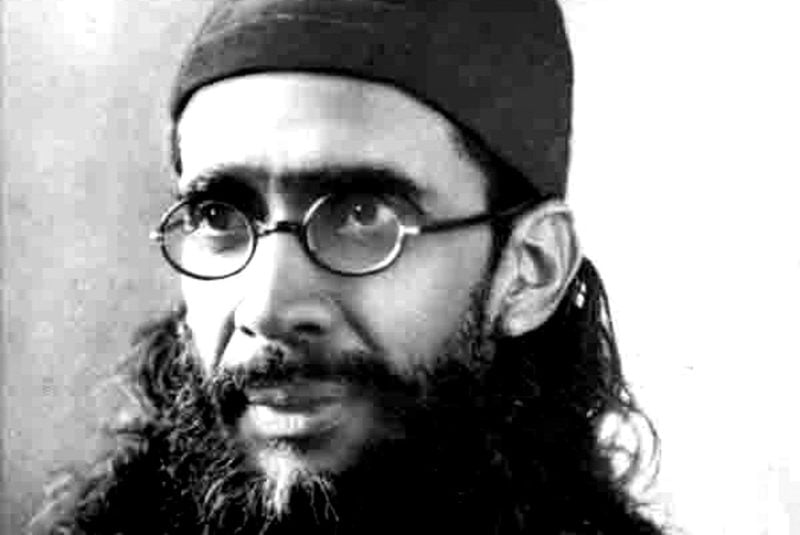
- Born: Syed Ali Hasan; 26 December 1878 / 2 Moharram 1296 AH; Delhi, India
- Died: July 31, 1955 (aged 77) / 10 Zilhajj, 1374 AH; New Delhi, India
- Other name: Hasan Nizami
- Occupation: Writer
- Known for: Poetry, Sufi tariqa
- Title: Khawaja
- Predecessor: Meher Ali Shah
- Successor: Khwaja Hasan Sani Nizami
- Spouse: Mehmooda Bano
- Children: Khwaja Hasan Sani Nizami
- Parents: Khwaja Hafiz Syed Ashiq Ali Nizami (father); Hazrat Sayeda Chaheti Begum Nizami (mother)

Khwaja Hasan Nizami (born Syed Ali Hasan; 26 December 1878 – 31 July 1955) was an Indian Sufi saint and a known Urdu essayist, humorist and satirist who wrote many essays for the Mukhzun Akhbar magazine. He wrote more than 500 books including the incidents of Indian Rebellion of 1857, while Mulla Wahidi writes that he had over five hundred books on an amazing variety of subjects to his credit. Being a Sufi, he had many disciples and it appeared in his literature.

His maternal grandfather Ghulam Hasan Chisti was a friend and spiritual advisor to Bahadur Shah Zafar and frequently visited the Red Fort. His mother used to tell him the stories of the Mughal family she had heard from her father. He had himself met Kulsum Zamani Begum, Zafar's daughter. He has narrated the tragic stories of Mirza Nasir-ul-Mulk, Zafar's grandson, who eventually became a servant of a British family and later crawled on his knees and begged in Bazar Chitli Kabr. Mirza Kamar Sultan, another of Zafar's grandson also used to beg at the Jama Masjid.

== Works ==
Nizami "was of Nizamuddin Auliya's known silsilã, and widely honoured in the Muslim world."

=== Literary works ===
Khwaja wrote many books including:

- Fãtami Dãwat-i-Islam (1920)
- Gadar ki Subah aur Sham
- Tareekh-e-Firaun
- Krishan Beeti
- Madar-e-Hamdard
- Sair-e-Delhi
- Government Aur Khilafat
- Ghalib's Diary
- Bahaddur Shah Zafar's Diary (publisher)
- Begumat Kay Ansoo: Dehli Kay Afsanay (also translated as Tears of the Begums, Stories of Survivors of the Uprising of 1857)
- Ap Biti (autobiography)

=== Commemoration of Muharram ===
As most of the Muslims had migrated to Pakistan after partition in 1947 AD, Delhi had no Shia orator to address the Majlis during Muharram. At this crucial juncture, Khwaja Hasan Nizami filled the gap by addressing Majlis at Panja Shareef. He was also supported by Maulana Ahmad Saeed, Maulana Zubair Qureshi, and Justice Vyas Dev Mishra in his endeavor to ensure sustainability of commemoration of Muharram against odds, despite Khawaja Hasan Nizami being part of the Ahl us Sannah wal Jammah.

Dr. Majid Deobandi had written a PhD thesis on Khwaja Hasan Nizami.
