= Atif Aslam discography =

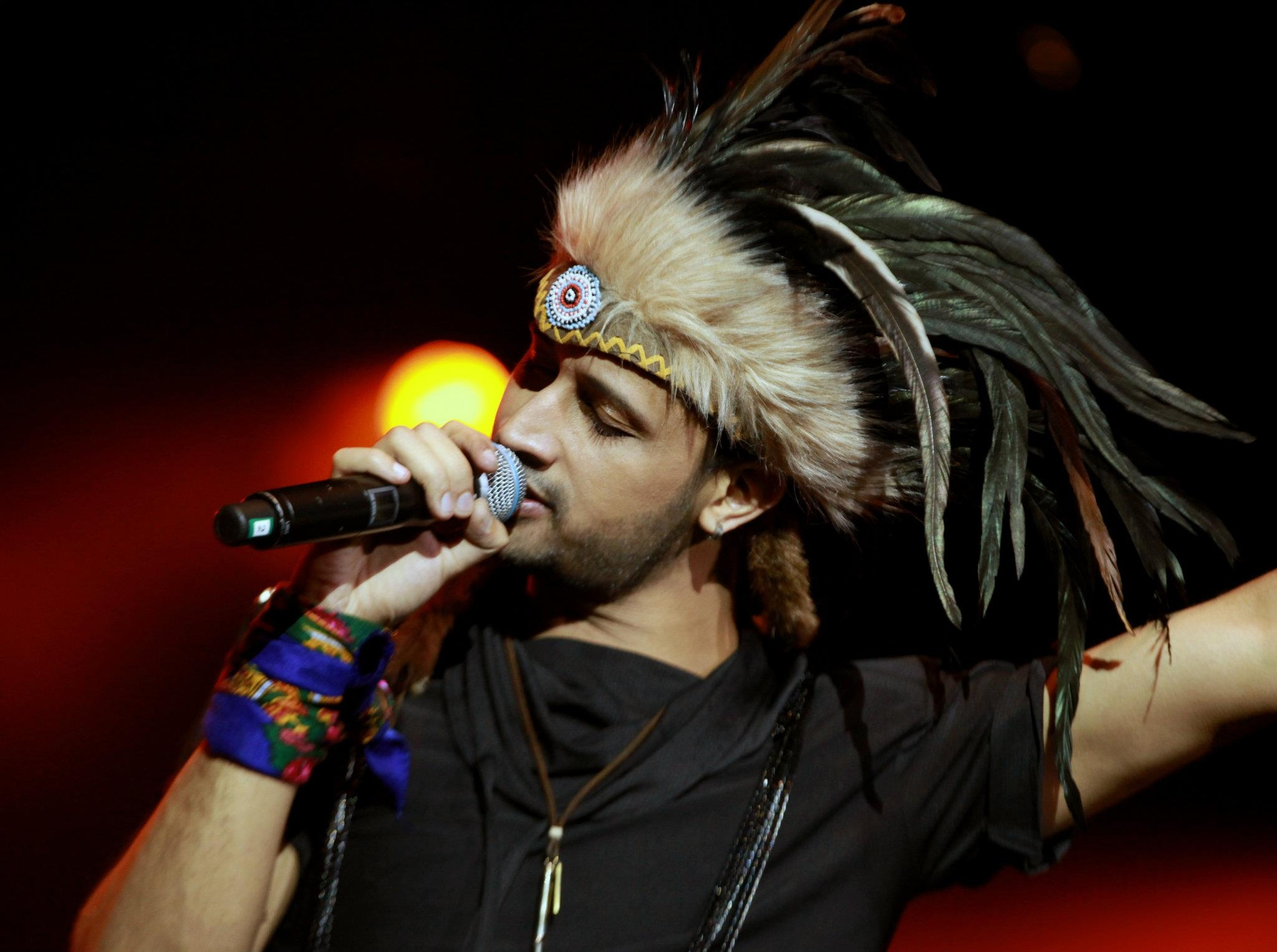
- Atif Aslam performing at The O2 Arena.
- Studio albums: 4
- Singles: 75
- TV Drama Series: 4
- Pakistani films: 8
- Hollywood: 8
- Bollywood: 59
- Punjabi cinema: 4
- Bengali cinema: 1
- Coke Studio: 21

Atif Aslam (Urdu: عاطف اسلم) is a Pakistani pop, rock, film and playback singer, songwriter, composer and an actor. His discography consists of three studio albums, numerous songs for Pakistani films, Indian films and Hollywood films, and many other popular songs. He predominantly sings in Urdu, Hindi and Punjabi. He has also sung a song in Bengali. He also recited Adhan in 2020. Besides this, Atif Aslam also had an album named "Hungami Halat" which was leaked in 2007 and consists of 8 songs. Later, 7 songs from this album, with some changes, were included in his third album Meri Kahani released in 2008.

In 2026, Aslam announced his fourth studio album, Subah Aye Na, which was released on 31 July 2026.

== Albums ==
Title	Details
Jal Pari	Released: 17 July 2004; No. of Songs: 11; Label: Sound Master, IC Records; Formats: CD
Doorie	Released: 22 December 2006; No. of Songs: 9; Label: Tips Music, The Musik Records; Formats: CD, digital download
Meri Kahani	Released: 8 January 2008; No. of Songs: 12; Label: Tips Music, Fire Records (Pakistan); Formats: CD
Subah Aye Na	Released: 31 July 2026; No. of Songs: 8; Formats: Spotify, Apple Music, Digital Streaming

- Compilation album: Dhanak Kay Rang (2020)

== Pakistani Film Songs ==
Year	Film	#	Song	Composer(s)	Lyricist(s)	Co-artist(s)	Ref.
2011	Bol	1	"Hona Tha Pyar"	Atif Aslam	Imran Raza	Hadiqa Kiani	
2011	Bol	2	"Kaho – Aaj Bol Do"	Atif Aslam	Ayub Khawar	Hadiqa Kiani	
2015	Ho Mann Jahaan	3	"Dil Kare"	Atif Aslam	Asim Raza		
2016	Actor in Law	4	"Dil Yeh Dancer Ho Gaya"	Shani Arshad	Nabeel Qureshi, Fizza Ali Mirza		
2018	Parwaaz Hai Junoon	5	"Thaam Lo"	Azaan Sami Khan	Shakeel Sohail		
2019	Superstar	6	"In Dinon"	Azaan Sami Khan	Shakeel Sohail		
2019	Superstar	7	"Anjaana"	Azaan Sami Khan	Shakeel Sohail		
2022	Kamli	8	"Mukhra"	Saad Sultan	Bulleh Shah		

== TV Series (OST) Songs ==
Year	TV Drama	#	Song	Composer(s)	Lyricist(s)	Co-artist(s)	Notes
2008	Mere Paas Paas	1	"Aas Paas"	Atif Aslam		Hadiqa Kiani	Hum TV
2008	Mere Paas Paas	2	"Aas Paas (Solo Version)"	Atif Aslam			Hum TV
2022	Sang-e-Mah	3	"Sang-e-Mah"	Sahir Ali Bagga	Fatima Najeeb		Hum TV
2024	Gentleman	4	"Tumhari Chup"	Naveed Nashad	Khalil Ul Rehman Qamar		Green Entertainment

== Bollywood Film Songs ==
Year	Film	#	Song	Composer(s)	Lyricist(s)	Co-artist(s)
2005	Zeher	1	"Woh Lamhe Woh Baatein"	Mithoon	Sayeed Quadri	
2005	Zeher	2	"Lamhe – DJ Mix"	Mithoon	Sayeed Quadri	
2005	Kalyug	3	"Aadat"	Mithoon	Sayeed Quadri	
2005	Kalyug	4	"Aadat – Remix"	Mithoon	Sayeed Quadri	
2006	Bas Ek Pal	5	"Tere Bin"	Mithoon	Sayeed Quadri	
2006	Bas Ek Pal	6	"Tere Bin – Remix"	Mithoon	Sayeed Quadri	
2008	Race	7	"Pehli Nazar Mein"	Pritam	Sameer	
2008	Race	8	"Pehli Nazar Mein – Club Mix"	Pritam	Sameer	
2008	Race	9	"Pehli Nazar Mein – Lounge Mix"	Pritam	Sameer	
2008	Kismat Konnection	10	"Bakhuda Tumhi Ho"	Pritam	Sayeed Quadri	Alka Yagnik
2008	Kismat Konnection	11	"Bakhuda Tumhi Ho – Remix"	Pritam	Sayeed Quadri	Alka Yagnik
2009	Ajab Prem Ki Ghazab Kahani	12	"Tera Hone Laga Hoon"	Pritam	Ashish Pandit	Alisha Chinai
2009	Ajab Prem Ki Ghazab Kahani	13	"Tera Hone Laga Hoon – Remix"	Pritam	Ashish Pandit	Alisha Chinai
2009	Ajab Prem Ki Ghazab Kahani	14	"Tu Jaane Na"	Pritam	Irshad Kamil	
2009	Ajab Prem Ki Ghazab Kahani	15	"Tu Jaane Na – Remix"	Pritam	Irshad Kamil	
2010	Prince	16	"Aa Bhi Jaa Sanam"	Sachin Gupta	Sameer	
2010	Prince	17	"Aa Bhi Jaa Sanam – Remix"	Sachin Gupta	Sameer	
2010	Prince	18	"Kaun Hoon Main"	Sachin Gupta	Sameer	
2010	Prince	19	"Kaun Hoon Main – Dance Mix"	Sachin Gupta	Sameer	
2010	Prince	20	"Kaun Hoon Main – Lounge Mix"	Sachin Gupta	Sameer	
2010	Prince	21	"O Mere Khuda"	Sachin Gupta	Sameer	Garima Jhingon
2010	Prince	22	"O Mere Khuda – Dance Mix"	Sachin Gupta	Sameer	Garima Jhingon
2010	Prince	23	"Tere Liye"	Sachin Gupta	Sameer	Shreya Ghoshal
2010	Prince	24	"Tere Liye – Dance Mix"	Sachin Gupta	Sameer	Shreya Ghoshal
2011	F.A.L.T.U	25	"Le Jaa Tu Mujhe"	Sachin–Jigar	Sameer	
2012	Tere Naal Love Ho Gaya	26	"Piya O Re Piya"	Sachin–Jigar	Priya Saraiya	Shreya Ghoshal
2012	Tere Naal Love Ho Gaya	27	"Piya – Remix"	Sachin–Jigar	Priya Saraiya	Shreya Ghoshal
2012	Tere Naal Love Ho Gaya	28	"Piya O Re Piya – Sad Version"	Sachin–Jigar	Priya Saraiya	Priya Saraiya
2012	Tere Naal Love Ho Gaya	29	"Tu Mohabbat Hai"	Sachin–Jigar	Priya Saraiya	Monali Thakur, Priya Saraiya
2012	Tere Naal Love Ho Gaya	30	"Tu Mohabbat Hai – Remix"	Sachin–Jigar	Priya Saraiya	Monali Thakur, Priya Saraiya
2013	Jayanta Bhai Ki Luv Story	31	"Aa Bhi Ja Mere Mehermaan"	Sachin–Jigar	Priya Saraiya	
2013	Jayanta Bhai Ki Luv Story	32	"Dil Na Jaane Kyun"	Sachin–Jigar	Priya Saraiya	Anushka Manchanda
2013	Jayanta Bhai Ki Luv Story	33	"Hai Na"	Sachin–Jigar	Mayur Puri	Priya Saraiya
2013	Race 2	34	"Allah Duhai Hai"	Pritam	Mayur Puri	Anushka Manchanda, Vishal Dadlani, Michie One, Ritu Pathak
2013	Race 2	35	"Allah Duhai Hai – Remix"	Pritam	Mayur Puri	Anushka Manchanda, Vishal Dadlani, Michie One, Ritu Pathak
2013	Race 2	36	"Be Intehaan"	Pritam	Mayur Puri	Sunidhi Chauhan
2013	Race 2	37	"Be Intehaan – Remix"	Pritam	Mayur Puri	Aks
2013	Ramaiya Vasta Vaiya	38	"Jeene Laga Hoon"	Sachin–Jigar	Priya Saraiya	Shreya Ghoshal
2013	Ramaiya Vasta Vaiya	39	"Bairiyaa"	Sachin–Jigar	Priya Saraiya	Shreya Ghoshal
2013	Ramaiya Vasta Vaiya	40	"Rang Jo Lagyo"	Sachin–Jigar	Priya Saraiya	Shreya Ghoshal
2013	Phata Poster Nikhla Hero	41	"Main Rang Sharbaton Ka"	Pritam	Irshad Kamil	Chinmayi Sripada
2013	Phata Poster Nikhla Hero	42	"Janam Janam"	Pritam	Irshad Kamil	
2013	Phata Poster Nikhla Hero	43	"Janam Janam – Sad Version"	Pritam	Irshad Kamil	
2014	Entertainment	44	"Nahin Woh Saamne"	Sachin–Jigar	Priya Saraiya	
2014	Entertainment	45	"Tera Naam Doon"	Sachin–Jigar	Priya Saraiya	Shalmali Kholgade
2015	Badlapur	46	"Jeena Jeena"	Sachin–Jigar	Priya Saraiya	
2015	Badlapur	47	"Jeena Jeena – Remix"	Sachin–Jigar	Priya Saraiya	
2015	Bajrangi Bhaijaan	48	"Tu Chahiye"	Pritam	Amitabh Bhattacharya	
2016	Loveshhuda	49	"Mar Jaayen"	Mithoon	Sayeed Quadri	
2016	Loveshhuda	50	"Mar Jaayen – Reprise"	Mithoon	Sayeed Quadri	
2016	Loveshhuda	51	"Mar Jaayen – Radio Edit"	Mithoon	Sayeed Quadri	
2016	Loveshhuda	52	"Mar Jaayen – EDM Remix"	Mithoon	Sayeed Quadri	
2016	Rustom	53	"Tere Sang Yaara"	Arko	Manoj Muntashir	
2016	A Flying Jatt	54	"Toota Jo Kabhi Tara"	Sachin–Jigar	Priya Saraiya	Sumedha Karmahe
2016	A Flying Jatt	55	"Khair Mangda"	Sachin–Jigar	Priya Saraiya	
2017	Hindi Medium	56	"Hoor"	Sachin–Jigar	Priya Saraiya	
2017	Half Girlfriend	57	"Baarish"	Tanishk Bagchi	Arafat Mehmood	Shashaa Tirupati
2017	Sweetiee Weds NRI	58	"Musafir"	Palash Muchhal	Palak Muchhal	Palak Muchhal
2017	Sweetiee Weds NRI	59	"Musafir – Remix"	Palash Muchhal	Palak Muchhal	Arijit Singh
2017	Raabta	60	"Darasal"	JAM8	Irshad Kamil	
2017	Tubelight	61	"Main Agar"	Pritam	Amitabh Bhattacharya	
2017	Qarib Qarib Singlle	62	"Jaane De"	Vishal Mishra	Raj Shekhar	
2017	Tiger Zinda Hai	63	"Dil Diyan Gallan"	Vishal–Shekhar	Irshad Kamil	
2018	Daas Dev	64	"Sehmi Hai Dhadkan"	Vipin Patwa	Dr. Sagar	
2018	Baaghi 2	65	"O Saathi"	Arko		
2018	Race 3	66	"Selfish – Solo Version"	Vishal Mishra	Salman Khan	
2018	Race 3	67	"Selfish"	Vishal Mishra	Salman Khan	Iulia Vantur
2018	Race 3	68	"Selfish – Unplugged Version"	Vishal Mishra	Salman Khan	Vishal Mishra
2018	Satyameva Jayate	69	"Paniyon Sa"	Rochak Kohli	Kumaar	Tulsi Kumar
2018	Genius	70	"Dil Meri Na Sune"	Himesh Reshammiya	Manoj Muntashir	
2018	Genius	71	"Dil Meri Na Sune – Reprise"	Himesh Reshammiya	Manoj Muntashir	Payal Dev
2018	Laila Majnu	72	"O Meri Laila"	Joi Barua	Irshad Kamil	Jyotica Tangri
2018	Laila Majnu	73	"Tum"	Niladri Kumar	Irshad Kamil	
2018	Mitron	74	"Chalte Chalte"	Tanishk Bagchi		
2018	Batti Gul Meter Chalu	75	"Dekhte Dekhte"	Nusrat Fateh Ali Khan, Rochak Kohli	Nusrat Fateh Ali Khan, Manoj Muntashir	
2018	Loveyatri	76	"Tera Hua"	Tanishk Bagchi	Manoj Muntashir	
2018	Loveyatri	77	"Tera Hua – Unplugged"	Tanishk Bagchi	Manoj Muntashir	
2018	Namaste England	78	"Tere Liye"	Mannan Shaah	Javed Akhtar	Akanksha Bhandari
2019	Hum Chaar	79	"Auliya"	Vipin Patwa	Shabbir Ahmed	

== Replaced film songs ==
Year	Film	#	Song	Composer(s)	Lyricist(s)	Replaced By	Note	Ref.
2017	Cockpit	1	"Mithe Alo"	Arindom Chatterjee	Anindya Chottopadhay	Arnab Dutta	Removed due to copyright issue	
2019	Notebook	2	"Main Taare"	Vishal Mishra	Manoj Muntashir	Salman Khan	Unofficially Released	
2019	Romeo Akbar Walter	3	"Jee Len De"	Raaj Aashoo	Murli Agarwal	Mohit Chauhan	Officially Released by Times Music	
2019	De De Pyaar De	4	"Tu Mila To Haina"	Amaal Mallik	Kunaal Vermaa	Arijit Singh	Unofficially Released	
2019	—N/a	5	"Pachtaoge"	B Praak	Jaani	Arijit Singh	Unofficially Released	
2019	—N/a	6	"Sajda Karu"	Asad Khan	Raqueeb Alam	Stebin Ben	Unofficially Released	
2019	Marjaavaan	7	"Kinna Sona"	Meet Bros	Kumaar	Jubin Nautiyal	Officially Released by T-Series and later removed	

== Punjabi film songs ==
Year	Film	#	Song	Composer(s)	Lyricist(s)	Co-artist(s)
2010	Mel Karade Rabba	1	"Rona Chadita – Mahi Mahi"	Jaidev Kumar	Kashmir Thakarwal	
2022	Lover	2	"Rangreza"	Babbu	Snipr	
2023	Carry on Jatta 3	3	"Bura Haal"	Jaani	Dr. Sagar	
2024	Jee Ve Sohneya Jee	4	"Jee Ve Sohneya Jee"	Sunny Vik	Raj Fatehpur	

== Hollywood films ==
Year	Film	#	Song	Composer(s)	Co-artist(s)	Note	Ref.
2005	Man Push Cart	1	"Aadat"	Goher Mumtaz			
2005	Man Push Cart	2	"Ehsaas"	Atif Aslam			
2005	Man Push Cart	3	"Yakeen"	Atif Aslam			
2010	Spanish Beauty	4	"Doorie"	Sachin Gupta		Dubbed film	
2010	Spanish Beauty	5	"Maula"	Sachin Gupta		Dubbed film	
2011	Road to Peshawar	6	"Mai Ne"	Atif Aslam		Short film	
2012	The Reluctant Fundamentalist	7	"Bol Ke Lab Azaad Hain"	Peter Gabriel	Peter Gabriel		
2012	The Reluctant Fundamentalist	8	"Mori Araj Suno"	Michael Andrews			

== Singles ==
=== Coke Studio (Pakistan) ===
Year	Season	#	Song	Co-singer(s)	Notes
2009	2	1	"Jal Pari"		
2009	2	2	"Kinara"	Riaz Ali Khan	
2009	2	3	"Wasta Pyar Da"		
2009	2	4	"Mai Ni Main"		
2009	2	5	"Humain Kya Hua"		
2012	5	6	"Charka Nolakha"	Qayaas	
2012	5	7	"Rabba Sacheya"		
2012	5	8	"Dholna"		
2013	6	9	"Channa"		
2015	Special	10	"Phir Se Game Utha Dain"	Faisal Kapadia, Asrar, Jimmy Khan and many Pakistani artists	Pakistan's official song for 2015 Cricket World Cup, rendition of Matt Slogett and Kasey Carlone's famed 1992 hit "Who Rules The World"
2015	8	11	"Sohni Dharti"	Season's ft. artistes	
2015	8	12	"Tajdar-e-Haram"		Produced by Shiraz Uppal; originally performed by Sabri Brothers
2015	8	13	"Man Aamadeh Am"	Gul Panra	
2015	8	14	"Kadi Ao Ni"	Mai Dhai	
2019	12	15	"Wohi Khuda Hai'		Produced by Rohail Hyatt; originally performed by Nusrat Fateh Ali Khan
2019	12	16	"Mubarik Mubarik"	Banur's Band	
2019	12	17	"Aaye Kuch Abr"		
2020	Special	18	"Asma-ul-Husna"	Produced by Xulfi ft. Vocal Acapella from across Pakistan	
2021	Special	19	"Cricket Khidaiye"	For Pakistan cricket team in 2021 ICC Men's T20 World Cup, ft. Faris Shafi and Talal Qureshi	
2022	14	20	"Sajan Das Na"	Momina Mustehsan	Collaborated with Abdullah Siddiqui and Xulfi
2022	14	21	"Go"	Abdullah Siddiqui	Collaborated with Abdullah Siddiqui and Xulfi

=== Borderless World ===
Season	Episode	Song	Lyrics	Composer	Music	Notes	Ref
Season 01 (2025)	01	"Peeran"	Atif Aslam		Ahsan Parvaiz Mehdi		
Season 01 (2025)	02	"Umeedon Ki"	Jawad Sarwar Naqvi & Omer Ahmad	Atif Aslam, Hussain Ahmed & Sharjeel Hasan	Ahsan Parvaiz Mehdi		
Season 01 (2025)	03	“Channa”	Atif Aslam		Haroon Leo (Leo Twins)	recreation of "Channa" from Coke Studio – Season 6	
Season 01 (2025)	04	"Kinaray "		Tanras Khan	Ahsan Parvaiz Mehdi	recreation of a classical bandish "Kinare Darya Kashti Bandho"	
Season 01 (2025)	05	"Hum Rahi"	Atif Aslam		Ahsan Parvaiz Mehdi	recreation of "Humrahi" from 2008 album Meri Kahani	
Season 01 (2025)	06	"Ya Nabi (ﷺ) Salam Alaika"	Shahzad Aslam			Naat ft. Ahsan Parvaiz Mehdi, Kumail Jaffery	

=== Pakistani songs ===
Year	#	Song	Co-singer	Music	Notes
2003	1	"Aadat"		Goher Mumtaz & Atif Aslam	First Song Ever
2005	2	"Yaaro Yehi Dosti Hai – Cover"		Junoon Band	Cover song released by Indus Music
2005	3	"Play Your Role(Haath Uthao)"		Atif Aslam, Kashif Ejaz	Released by Indus Music for Tsunami Victims
2010	4	"We Will Rise Again"	Todd Shea	Lanny Cordola	
2010	5	Hand in Hand		Lanny Cordola	
2010	6	The Dreamer			
2010	7	Pakistan: I Have A Dream		Lanny Cordola	
2010	8	"Ab Khud Kuch Karna Paray Ga"	Strings		
2011	9	"Gulabi Aankhein – Bonus Track"			
2013	10	"Zameen Jaagti Hai"		Shiraz Uppal	Defence Day
2013	11	"Tu Khaas Hai"		Atif Aslam	
2016	12	"Yaar Yaaron Se Hon Na Juda"	Ali Zafar	Sahir Ali Bagga	Defence Day
2017	13	Launch Song	Fawad Khan, Meesha Shafi, Shahi Hasan		Pepsi Battle of the Bands Season 2
2017	14	"Yaad Tehari"			
2017	15	"Meray Watan"			
2017	16	"Kabhi Percham Mein"		Sahir Ali Bagga	Defence Day
2018	17	"Humein Pyaar Hai Pakistan Se"		Sahir Ali Bagga	Defence Day
2019	18	"Shaheen e Pakistan"		Imran Zak	Pakistan Day special
2021	19	"Paighaam Layi Saba"		Masood Alam, Shiraz Uppal	Defence Day
2021	20	"Dil Khush Huwa"		Sahir Ali Bagga	Defence Day
2022	21	"Agay Dekh"	Aima Baig	Abdullah Siddiqui	#HBLPSL7 anthem by TikTok
2022	22	"Manzil"	Shae Gill		COVID-19 – U.S. Mission Pakistan
2023	23	"Jaan Ki Qeemat"			ISPR music video
2025	24	"Assalam o Ya Habibi Assalam"		Hassan Badshah	Hum TV
2025	25	"Sab Ka Shajra Pakistan"		Sahir Ali Bagga	Pakistan Day Special – ISPR music video
2025	26	"Khelenge Beat Pe"	Aima Baig, Daniya Kanwal, Sabri Sisters	Nimra Gilani, Daniya Kanwal	HBL PSL 11 Anthem

=== Other music videos ===
Year	#	Title	Co-artist	Composer	Lyricist	Album	Note
2015	1	"Zindagi Aa Raha Hoon Main"		Amaal Mallik	Manoj Muntashir		feat. Tiger Shroff
2015	2	"Nadaan Parindey – Remix"	DJ Chetas			Life Is A Mashup – Vol. 4	DJ Chetas made this remix with Atif Aslam in 2015, officially uploaded on YouTube in 2021
2016	3	"I'm Alive"	Maher Zain	Dhruv Ghanekar	Dhruv Ghanekar, Ishitta Arun		
2017	4	"Pehli Dafa"		Shiraz Uppal	Shakeel Sohail		feat. Ileana D'Cruz
2017	5	"Younhi"		Atif Aslam	Atif Aslam		feat. Nicolli Dela Nina
2018	6	"Jab Koi Baat"	DJ Chetas, Shirley Setia	DJ Chetas	Indeevar		
2018	7	"12 Bajay"					
2019	8	"Baarishein"		Arko Pravo Mukherjee			feat. Nushrat Bharucha
2019	9	"Pardadari"	Abida Parveen	Abida Parveen	Hazrat Bedam Shah Warsi	Bazm e Rang Chapter 1	
2020	10	"Woh Mere Bin"	Sachin Gupta				
2020	11	"Kadi Te Hans Bol"					Released by Velo Sound Station
2020	12	"Raat"		Atif Aslam, Saad Sultan	Munir Niazi, Atif Aslam		feat. Gohar Rasheed, Mansha Pasha, Syra Yousuf, Kiran Malik, Khalid Malik, Fouzan
2021	–	"Jogi Bana Main – Maula"		Sachin Gupta	Sachin Gupta, Sachin Paul	Doorie	Maula song music video
2021	13	"Chale To Kat Hi Jayega"		Khaleel Ahmed	Mustafa Zaidi		
2021	14	"Mustafa Jaan e Rehmat"	Ali Pervez Mehdi, Nouman Javed, Ahsan Pervaiz Mehdi, Kumail Jaffery				
2022	15	"Dil Jalane Ki Baat"		Saad Sultan, Tassadduq Shad	Jawed Qureshi		
2022	16	"Rafta Rafta"	Raj Ranjodh				feat. Sajal Aly
2022	17	"Ajnabi"		Ahsan Pervaiz Mehdi	Atif Aslam		feat. Mahira Khan
2022	18	"Moonrise"		Raj Ranjodh			feat. Amy Jackson
2022	19	"Mangan Aiyaan"		Atif Aslam	Ahsan Pervaiz Mehdi		Released by Velo Sound Station 2.0
2022	20	"Jalna"	Rozeo				Released by Velo Sound Station 2.0
2022	21	"Kyun Kay Main Green Hoon"	RFAK, Abida Parveen, Sahir Ali Bagga, Shafqat Amanat Ali, Asim Azhar, Ali Azmat, Gul Panra, Faakhir	Sahir Ali Bagga	Imran Raza		Green Entertainment OST
2023	22	"Moonrise – Acoustic Version"		Raj Ranjodh			
2023	23	"Jaane Jaa"	Asees Kaur	DJ Chetas, R.D. Burman	Anand Bakshi		Released later removed on due to backlash from anantnag terrorist attack.
2023	24	"Zindagi"		Leo Twins, Nashad	Qateel Shifai		A tribute to Ustad Mehdi Hassan Khan
2024	25	"Main Sadqay Ya Rasool Allah"		Ahsan Pervez Mehdi	Fatima Najeeb		
2025	26	"Jeeto Baazi Khel Ke"		Adnan Dhool, Asfandyar Asad		Official Anthem – ICC Men's Champions Trophy Pakistan 2025.	Produced By: Abdullah Siddiqui
2025	27	"Sanu Ek Pal"	Nusrat Fateh Ali Khan	Bilal Lashari, Nusrat Fateh Ali Khan	Nusrat Fateh Ali Khan		Velo Sound Station Season 3
2025	28	"Turbo"	Risham Faiz Bhutta	Adnan Dhool, Atif Aslam, RFB	Adnan Dhool, Atif Aslam, RFB, Omer Ahmed		Velo Sound Station Season 3
2026	29	"Noor"	Sami Yusuf				

=== TV commercials' songs ===
Year	#	Song	Notes
2009	1	"Hum Mustafavi"	Olper's Qawwali
2010	2	"Jee Lay Zindagi"	Warid Pakistan
2012	3	"Juro Gey to Jano Gey"	Jazba by Jazz Pakistan
2012	4	"Juro Gey to Jano Gey – Poem Version"	Jazba by Jazz Pakistan
2014	5	"Dil se Dil"	QMobile Noir i10
2014	6	"Faasle"	Etisalat
2016	7	"Jal Pari – Reprise"	Huawei Honor 5X
2017	8	"Noor-e-Azal"	Pepsi Liter of Light
2017	9	"Jee Lay Har Pal"	Pepsi Pakistan
2017	10	"Jee Lay Har Pal – Reprise"	Reprise Version; official anthem for Pakistan national under-19 cricket team, 2017 ACC Under-19 Asia Cup
2020	11	"Ik Naya Khuwab"	Zong 4G advertisement song
2021	12	"Ik Naya Khuwab – 2.0"	Version 2.0; Zong 4G
2024	13	"Allah Hu Allah Hu"	Sarsabz Fertilizer
2025	14	"Faslon Ko Takalluf"	Sarsabz Fertilizer

== See also ==
- Nusrat Fateh Ali Khan discography
- Rahat Fateh Ali Khan discography
- Ali Zafar discography
- Sahir Ali Bagga discography
- List of awards and nominations received by Atif Aslam
