= List of awards and nominations received by Atif Aslam =

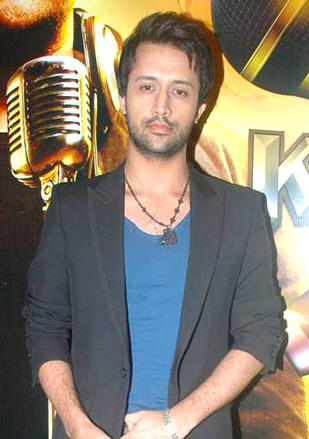
- Atif Aslam at the launch of Sur Kshetra.
Awards	Wins	Nominations
Indus Music Awards	3	0
Sahara Sangeet Awards	2	0
The Musik Awards	2	0
Lux Style Awards	8	0
MTV Brrr Music Awards	2	0
World Music Awards	1	0
Filmfare Awards	0	5
Lycra MTV Style Awards	1	0
IIFA Awards	3	0
Screen Awards	1	0
Guild Awards	1	0
Zee Cine Awards	1	0
GIMA Awards	1	0
MTV IGGY Awards	1	0
Pakistan Media Awards	3	0
Big Apple Music Awards	3	0
Hum Style Awards	4	0
BIG Star Entert. Awards	1	0
- Totals (Note: Certain award groups do not award just one winner. They recognize several different recipients, have runners-up, and have a third place. Since this is a specific recognition and is different from losing an award, runner-up mentions are considered wins in this award tally. For simplification and to avoid errors, each award in this list has been presumed to have had a prior nomination.)
Awards	51
Nominations	0

Atif Aslam is a Pakistani playback singer, songwriter, composer, and actor. His first song, "Aadat", won him three awards. "Tu Jaane Na" won him an award and received three other nominations. "Jeena Jeena" and "Jeene Laga Hoon" were also nominated twice. In 2008, Aslam received the Tamgha-e-Imtiaz (medal of distinction), the fourth-highest civilian honour from the Pakistani government, as well as numerous Lux Style Awards. In 2019, he was awarded a star on the Dubai Walk of Fame upon his nomination as the "Best Singer in Pakistan". He has won six Lux Style Awards and received five Filmfare nominations.

Aslam has won the following awards and nominations in Pakistan, India, and other countries.

== Indus Music Awards ==
Aslam has won three awards in the categories of best song, best composition, and best lyrics.

Year	Album	Nomination	Category	Result	Ref.
2005	Jal Pari	"Aadat" (song)	Best Song	Won	
2005	Jal Pari	"Aadat" (song)	Best Composition	Won	
2005	Jal Pari	"Aadat" (song)	Best Lyrics	Won	

== Sahara Sangeet Awards ==
Aslam has won two awards in the categories of Best Playback Singer and Best Debut Singer.

Year	Category	Result	Ref.
2005	Best Playback Singer	Won	
2005	Best Debut Singer	Won	

== The Musik Awards ==
Aslam won an award in 2008 and was also nominated in 2006 in the category Most Wanted Male.

Year	Category	Result	Ref.
2006	Most Wanted Male	Nominated	
2008	Most Wanted Male	Nominated	

== Lux Style Awards ==
The Lux Style Awards is an award ceremony held annually in Pakistan since 2002. The awards celebrate "style" in the Pakistani entertainment industry, and it is the oldest event dedicated to the cinema, television, fashion, music, and the film industry in Pakistan. Aslam has won seven awards with two additional nominations.

Year	Album/Film	Nomination	Category	Result	Ref.
2005	Jal Pari	All Album	Best Album	Won	
2007	Doorie	All Album	Best Album	Won	
2008	Meri Kahani	All Album	Best Album	Nominated	
2008	Police Dress	N/A	Most Well Dressed Celebrity	Won	
2012	Bol	"Hona Tha Pyar" (song)	Song of the Year	Nominated	
2012	Bol	N/A	Best Original Sound Track	Won	
2013	N/A		Music Icon of the year	Won	
2017	Actor in Law	"Dil Dancer" (song)	Best Playback Singer (Male)	Won	
2019	Parwaaz Hai Junoon	"Thaam Lo" (song)	Best Playback Singer	Won	

== MTV Brrr Music Awards ==
Aslam has been nominated twice.

Year	Album	Nomination	Category	Result	Ref.
2009	Meri Kahani	"Hungami Halaat" (song)	Best Rock Song	Nominated	
2009	N/A		Best Male Singer	Nominated	

== Filmfare Awards ==
The Filmfare Awards are a set of awards that honour artistic and technical excellence in the Hindi-language film industry of India. Atif has been nominated five times but has not won an award.

Year	Film	Nominated Song	Category	Result	Ref.
2006	Zeher	"Woh Lamhey"	Filmfare Award for Best Male Playback Singer	Nominated	
2007	Bas Ek Pal	"Tere Bin"	Filmfare Award for Best Male Playback Singer	Nominated	
2010	Ajab Prem Ki Ghazab Kahani	"Tu Jaane Na"	Filmfare Award for Best Male Playback Singer	Nominated	
2016	Badlapur	"Jeena Jeena"	Filmfare Award for Best Male Playback Singer	Nominated	
2017	Rustom	"Tere Sang Yaara"	Filmfare Award for Best Male Playback Singer	Nominated	

== Lycra MTV Style Awards ==
Aslam has won one Lycra award.

Year	Category	Result	Ref.
2007	Most Stylish Person (Music)	Won	

== IIFA Awards ==
The International Indian Film Academy Awards (also known as the IIFA Awards) are a set of awards presented annually by the International Indian Film Academy to honour both artistic and technical excellence of professionals in Bollywood, the Hindi-language film industry. Aslam has won two awards, with one additional nomination.

Year	Film	Nominated Song	Category	Result	Ref.
2006	Zeher	"Woh Lamhey"	IIFA Award for Best Male Playback Singer	Nominated	
2009	Race	"Pehli Nazar Mein"	IIFA Award for Best Male Playback Singer	Nominated	
2010	Ajab Prem Ki Ghazab Kahani	"Tu Jaane Na"	IIFA Award for Best Male Playback Singer	Nominated	

== Star Screen Awards ==
The Star Screen Awards is an annual awards ceremony held in India honouring professional excellence in Bollywood. Aslam has been nominated twice.

Year	Film	Nominated Song	Category	Result	Ref.
2009	Race	"Pehli Nazar Mein"	Best Male Playback Singer	Nominated	
2019	Tiger Zinda Hai	"Dil Diyan Gallan"	Best Male Playback Singer	Nominated	

== Guild Awards ==
Aslam has been nominated one time.

Year	Film	Nominated Song	Category	Result	Ref.
2014	Ramaiya Vastavaiya	"Jeene Laga Hoon"	Best Male Playback Singer	Nominated	

== Zee Cine Awards ==
Zee Cine Award (also called ZCA) is an award ceremony for the Hindi film industry. They were instituted in November 1997 to award "Excellence in cinema – the democratic way".

Year	Film	Nominated Song	Category	Result	Ref.
2005	Zeher	"Woh Lamhey"	Best Song	Nominated	
2014	Ramaiya Vastavaiya	"Jeene Laga Hoon"	Best Male Playback Singer	Nominated	

== GiMA Awards ==
The Global Indian Music Academy Awards (also known as the GiMA Awards) are presented annually by the Global Indian Music Academy to honour and recognise Indian music. The nominees are voted by GiMA's jury, which includes some of the most respected artists in the country. GiMA provides a cohesive platform to celebrate and recognize the contribution of those who push the boundaries in Indian music. The Global Indian Music Academy Awards honour film and non-film music in separate categories.

Year	Film	Nominated Song	Category	Result	Ref.
2010	Ajab Prem Ki Ghazab Kahani	"Tu Jaane Na"	Best Male Playback Singer	Nominated	

== Big Star Entertainment Awards ==
Big Star Entertainment Awards were presented annually by Reliance Broadcast Network Limited in association with Star India to honour personalities from the field of entertainment across movies, music, television, sports, theatre, and dance.

Year	Film	Nominated Song	Category	Result	Ref.
2013	Tere Naal Love Ho Gaya	"Piya O Re Piya"	Best Male Playback Singer	Nominated	
2015	Badlapur	"Jeena Jeena"	Most Entertaining Singer (Male)	Nominated	

== MTV IGGY Awards ==
Year	Category	Result	Ref.
2011	Best New Band in the World	Nominated	

== Pakistan Media Awards ==
The Pakistan Media Awards (commonly known as the PMA), are a set of awards given annually for radio, television, film and theatre achievements. The awards are given each year at a formal ceremony.

Year	Film	Nomination	Category	Result	Ref.
2010	N/A		Best Male Singer	Won	
2011	N/A		Best Male Singer	Nominated	
2012	Bol	"Mustafa" (main character)	Best Film Actor	Nominated	
2012	Bol	"Hona Tha Pyar" (song)	Best Play	Nominated	

== The BrandLaureate International Awards ==
Year	Category	Result	Ref.
2013	Brand Personality	Won	

== Bollywood Hungama Surfer's Choice Music Awards ==
Year	Film	Nominated Song	Category	Result	Ref.
2009	Ajab Prem Ki Ghazab Kahani	"Tu Jaane Na"	Best Playback Singer (Male)	Won	
2010	Prince	"Tere Liye"	Best Playback Singer (Male)	Nominated	

== Big Apple Music Awards ==
Year	Category	Result	Ref.
2014	Best Male Artist Of Pakistan	Won	
2015	Best Male Artist Of Pakistan	Won	
2015	Most Popular Male Artist (International)	Won	

== World Music Awards ==
Year	Film	Nominated Song	Category	Result	Ref.
2013	Phata Poster Nikhla Hero	"Main Rang Sharbaton Ka"	World's Best Song	Nominated	

== Hum Style Awards ==
Year	Category	Result	Ref.
2016	Most Stylish Male Performer	Nominated	
2017	Most Stylish Male Performer	Nominated	
2017	QMobile Style Icon	Won	
2018	Most Stylish Male Performer	Nominated	

== Shaan-e-Pakistan Music Achievements ==
Year	Film	Nominated Song	Category	Result	Ref.
2020	Superstar	"In Dinon"	Best Male Playback Singer	Pending	

== See also ==
- List of awards and nominations received by Ali Zafar
- List of awards and nominations received by Rahat Fateh Ali Khan
- Atif Aslam discography
