= Wohi Khuda Hai =

1995 poem by Muzaffar Warsi

- by Muzaffar Warsi
- Written: 1995
- Country: Pakistan
- Language: Urdu, Arabic
- Genre: Hamd

Wohi Khuda Hai (Urdu: وہی خدا ہے, lit. 'That Being is God') is a hamd. The poem was written by Pakistani Urdu poet and lyricist, Muzaffar Warsi. It praises God as the Only Creator of the Universe that maintains its harmony and balance. It has been sung and covered multiple times across the globe by many artists. Some of the famous rendition are cited here.

== 1996 version ==
"Wohi Khuda Hai"

Single by Nusrat Fateh Ali Khan

from the album Naqsh
- Language: Urdu
- Released: 1996
- Genre: Qawwali
- Length: 6:28
- Label: Shalimar Recordings, Merciful The One
- Composer: Nusrat Fateh Ali Khan
- Lyricist: Muzaffar Warsi
External videos
- Wohi Khuda Hai on YouTube

It was first sung by Nusrat Fateh Ali Khan in 1996 for the album Naqsh.

== 2002 version ==
"Wohi Khuda Hai"

Single by Rahat Fateh Ali Khan
- Language: Urdu
- Released: 2002
- Genre: Qawwali
- Length: 6:48
- Label: Hi-Tech Music Limited
- Composer: Nusrat Fateh Ali Khan
- Lyricist: Muzaffar Warsi
External videos
- Wohi Khuda Hai on YouTube

In 2002, Rahat Fateh Ali Khan coveted it under the label Hi-Tech Music Limited.

== 2019 version ==
"Wohi Khuda Hai"

Single by Atif Aslam

from the album Coke Studio S12 opener
- Language: Urdu, Arabic
- Released: 11 October 2019
- Studio: Coke Studio
- Genre: Pop
- Length: 6:56
- Label: Coke Studio
- Composer: Nusrat Fateh Ali Khan
- Lyricist: Muzaffar Warsi
- Producers: Coca-Cola and Rohail Hyatt
External media
Audio
- Wohi Khuda Hai on SoundCloud
Video
- Wohi Khuda Hai on YouTube

In 2019, it was rendered by Atif Aslam for the Coke Studio Season 12 opener. It was produced by Rohail Hyatt. The music video features Atif Aslam performing, wearing a white Sherwani. All other singers and musicians in the video are shown wearing White dresses. The track ends with Durood recited by Atif Aslam, when all other musical instruments were turned off.

=== Pre-release ===
In an official press statement, Atif said that he still don't think he has made it. Atif also dedicated the performance to his elder son 'Ahad'. Atif said in Behind the scenes video that when he would grow up, he'll listen to it and would become happy to see his father's rendition of hamd and hoped that this song will help his son to find his own way to connect with the Divine. He further said that he recited the Hamd from his heart. Atif added that he felt like it just happened; it was in his luck. God provided him this opportunity and it's His blessing.

=== Views and popularity ===
It received more than 400,000 views on YouTube in its first hour, 2.6 million views on within 24 hours, and 10 million views on YouTube in the first two days of its release. As of September 2020, it had gained over 32 million views and 43K comments.

The song became popular in India and was one of the top ten trends (trend on 8) on YouTube in India.

=== Reception ===
Pakistani actress Mahira Khan took to Twitter that Atif Aslam and Rohail Hayat are in the house. Another Pakistani actress Mawra Hocane tweeted that since her childhood, this has been her favourite hamd and Atif Aslam and the Coke Studio team has lived up to the expectations. In another tweet she said that revisiting Tajdar-e-Haram Atif's voice magic. PTV host Shaista Lodhi tweeted that Rohail Hyatt nailed it, It has soulful lyrics, soothing composition and is beautiful rendition. Atif did best work till then and this is going to be historic. Pakistani actress and producer Hareem Farooq said that Atif and Rohail has created magic by presenting beautiful track.

Pakistani actress and TV host Veena Malik also praised Atif Aslam and Rohail Hyatt's collaboration. Another actress from Pakistan Ushna Shah tweeted that it's breathtaking. Actor Feroze Khan also tweeted. Ahmad Ali Butt, a Pakistani singer, producer and director posted on twitter that it's a pure and spiritual tribute given by love and devotion. Founder and editor-in-chief of 'Something Haute' posted that Atif Aslam's rendition is humble and submissive, like a man in Sujud. It's gentle and beautiful. Pakistan Tehreek-e-Insaf member and former finance minister of Pakistan Asad Umar praised and declared it as a brilliant rendition. Pakistani writer and presenter and host at Cricingif Roha Nadeem also praised it. Dawn news' Abdul Ghaffar tweeted that Atif Aslam did complete justice to this Hamd and Rohail Hyatt made it simple and close to the heart. Its end leaves in peace and tears. Fahad Malik, founder of Splenix Tech posted that the Durood at end was the best.

== See also ==
- Aaye Kuch Abr
- Tajdar-e-Haram
- Mubarik Mubarik
