= Bol (soundtrack) =

Soundtrack album by various artists
- Released: 2011
- Genre: Film soundtrack
- Labels: Fire Records (Pakistan), Tips Music
- Producer: various artists

Singles from Bol
- 1. "Hona Tha Pyaar" Released: September 5, 2011

Bol is the soundtrack album of the 2011 Urdu-language Pakistani film Bol by Shoaib Mansoor.

== Overview and reception ==
All songs are mixed and mastered by Kashif Ejaz. The singers include Atif Aslam, Sajjad Ali, Hadiqa Kiani, Ahmed Jahanzeb, Shabnam Majeed, Sahir Ali Bagga, Bina Jawad, Ali Javed. The song Hona Tha Payar was written and composed by a 16-years-old boy Ali Javed who sold the copyrights of song to the team Bol. The soundtrack was successful and generally received positive reviews from critics. However, one critical review published in The Express Tribune called the movie's soundtrack "A surprising disappointment" and saying that "The film’s music sounds unoriginal and boring. In fact, people unfamiliar with Sajjad Ali and Ahmed Jehanzaib, might confuse it for Bollywood music." It was also featured as one of the most-streamed Pakistani albums of 2025 in the year-end Spotify Wrapped rankings by Spotify Pakistan.

== Track listing ==
#	Song	Singer(s)	Composer(s)	Lyricist(s)	Length
1	Sayyan Bolain Na Bolain Hum Se Dur Nahin Jaaein	Shabnam Majeed, Sahir Ali Bagga, Bina Jawad	Shoaib Mansoor	Shoaib Mansoor	03:47
2	Hona Tha Pyaar	Atif Aslam, Hadiqa Kiani	Atif Aslam, Ali Javed	Imran Raza, Ali Javed	03:42
3	Aaj Bol Do	Atif Aslam, Hadiqa Kiani	Atif Aslam, Sarmad Ghafoor	Ayub Khawar	04:08
4	Din Pareshan Hay	Sajjad Ali	Sajjad Ali	Ali Moeen, Sajjad Ali	03:58
5	Mumkin Hay	Ahmed Jahanzeb, Shuja Haider	Shoaib Mansoor	Shoaib Mansoor	03:50
6	Dil Jaaniya	Hadiqa Kiani	Shoaib Mansoor	Shoaib Mansoor	03:15
7	Bol Background Music	Baqir Abbas	Shoaib Mansoor		07:10
