= Sochta Hoon =

Ghazal-Qawwali performed by Nusrat Fateh Ali Khan

Song by Ustad Nusrat Fateh Ali Khan
- Language: Urdu: "سوچتا ہوں"
- Recorded: 28 February 1985
- Genre: Ghazal; Qawwali
- Length: 26:10
- Label: Oriental Star Agencies
- Songwriter: Nusrat Fateh Ali Khan

"Sochta Hoon" (Urdu: سوچتا ہوں transl. I think / I wonder) is a ghazal-qawwali that was originally written, composed, and performed by Nusrat Fateh Ali Khan. From 1979 onwards, Nusrat Fateh Ali Khan had been singing "Sochta Hoon" during live performances in Pakistan. Outside of Pakistan, Nusrat's first live performance of "Sochta Hoon" took place on a tour to the UK on 28 February 1985 at the Allah Ditta Centre in Birmingham. This 1985 performance was recorded and released by Oriental Star Agencies Ltd, a British-based Asian music label. Sochta Hoon has also been popularized by his nephew Rahat Fateh Ali Khan, who has performed it at several concerts.

== 2016 remix ==
"Sochta Hoon"

Remix by Nusrat Fateh Ali Khan

from the album Reformed
- Released: 5 July 2016
- Recorded: 1985
- Genre: Ghazal; Qawwali
- Length: 4:37
- Label: Oriental Star Agencies, Hi-Tech Music
- Songwriters: Nusrat Fateh Ali Khan; A1melodymaster (remix)
- Producer: A1melodymaster

It was recreated and released as a single on 5 July 2016 by A1melodymaster for the album Reformed; which released on 16 March 2017 with different renewed songs of Nusrat Fateh Ali Khan.

== 2018 film version ==
"Dekhte Dekhte"

Song by Atif Aslam, Rahat Fateh Ali Khan

from the album Batti Gul Meter Chalu
- Released: 2018
- Genre: Romantic; Sufi; Filmi
- Length: 4:16
- Label: T-Series
- Composers: NFAK; Rochak Kohli
- Lyricists: NFAK; Manoj Muntashir
- Producer: Bhushan Kumar

It was recreated by lyricist Manoj Muntashir and composer Rochak Kohli for Shree Narayan Singh's 2018 Hindi film Batti Gul Meter Chalu. Under the title "Dekhte Dekhte" (Urdu: "دیکھتے دیکھتے"; Hindi: "देखते देखते"; transl. In a glance / In no time), it was released in two versions, first by Atif Aslam and second by Rahat Fateh Ali Khan. The song has been picturised on the star cast Shahid Kapoor and Shraddha Kapoor. It was produced by Bhushan Kumar under his label T-Series, whose sister Tulsi Kumar also covered the song.

After the release of Aslam's version, it became the most viewed Hindi song on YouTube with more than 20 million views within 24 hours, and rose up to trending #2 on YouTube India. It also topped the iTunes India Chart and BBC Asian Music Chart with #1 position.

== Popularity ==
Due to its popularity, the song has been covered by some artists in Pakistan and India; including Junaid Asghar, Sonu Kakkar and Manan Bhardwaj. Other cover versions were released by Qazi Touqeer, Shreya Karmakar, Satyajeet Jena and Arshman Naeem.

The titular lyrics from the 2018 film version went viral as a social media meme.

== See also ==
- Nusrat Fateh Ali Khan discography
- Rahat Fateh Ali Khan discography
- Atif Aslam discography
