= Phata Poster Nikhla Hero =

2013 Indian film by Rajkumar Santoshi

- Theatrical release poster
- Directed by: Rajkumar Santoshi
- Written by: Rajkumar Santoshi
- Produced by: Ramesh Taurani
- Starring: Shahid Kapoor; Ileana D'Cruz; Padmini Kolhapure
- Cinematography: Ravi Yadav
- Edited by: Steven H. Bernard; Additional Editing: V. N. Mayekar
- Music by: Songs: Pritam; Background Score: Raju Singh
- Production company: Tips Industries
- Distributed by: Tips Industries; Eros International
- Release date: 20 September 2013
- Country: India
- Language: Hindi
- Budget: ₹54 crore
- Box office: est. ₹72 crore

Phata Poster Nikhla Hero (transl. The poster tore and the hero came out) is a 2013 Indian Hindi-language action comedy film directed by Rajkumar Santoshi. The film stars Shahid Kapoor and Ileana D'Cruz in the lead roles, and was released on 20 September 2013 to a mixed to positive response from critics.

== Plot ==
Savitri Rao, a widow, hopes that her only son, Vishwas, will grow up to be a brave inspector. But Vishwas wants to become an actor. Dressed as a police inspector for a photo shoot, he meets social worker Kajal during a car chase. Kajal mistakes him for an inspector and thanks him for helping her catch the goons, while Vishwas plays along. He is mistakenly published in the newspaper as an inspector, which Savitri sees. She arrives in Mumbai to see her dream come true, and circumstances lead Vishwas to carry on his lie not only to Kajal but also to his mother.

While shooting for a film, Vishwas's mother discovers that he is not an inspector. She faints and is admitted to the hospital, where the doctor tells him that she needs to be operated on and the amount required is ₹ 1 million. He agrees to work for Gundappa (the boss of the goons Vishwas and Kajal caught) for money where he needs to bring a CD for them. While escaping after getting the CD, he is caught by police and accidentally shoots two police officers. Since he is now a murderer, he is left with no choice but to join Gundappa's gang. Meanwhile, Kajal, who is under the impression that Vishwas has gone bad, along with some men, plans to save him from doing any crime. So they go to the gangs den and tell the foolish Gundappa that she came to marry Vishwas. Hence, creating confusion so that Gundappa leaves Vishwas. On the other hand, Joint Commissioner (who was also kidnapped) tells Savitri that Vishwas is actually not doing any crime but is working for the police. Kajal learns this from Savitri later and goes to apologise to Vishwas for misunderstanding him. Not knowing that they are being watched on CCTV, she apologises to Vishwas and leaks details of his plans. Somehow, Vishwas and his mates are able to flee. But his mother and Kajal are held by Napoleon (the ultimate Don, boss of Gundappa). After fighting the goons, Vishwas hands over Napoleon (who is revealed to be his own father) to the police and tells everyone that he will become a police officer as they are real-life heroes. He did all the filmy actions as a fake police officer and now wants to be a real policeman. His mother's dream is finally fulfilled.

== Cast ==
- Shahid Kapoor as Vishwas Rao, Savitri's son
- Ileana D'Cruz as Kajal Sharma (Vishwas' love interest)
- Padmini Kolhapure as Savitri Rao
- Darshan Jariwala as Commissioner
- Saurabh Shukla as Gundappa Das
- Sanjay Mishra as Jogi Bhai
- Zakir Hussain as Officer Ghorpade
- Mukesh Tiwari as Napoleon and Vishwas's father, Yashwanth Rao
- Rana Jung Bahadur as Ashish Talpade
- Deepika Kamaiah as chief security officer's daughter
- Tinnu Anand as Director Pursottham
- Salman Khan in a cameo as Himself
- Nargis Fakhri in a (special appearance) in the song "Dhating Naach"

== Production ==
The film has often been termed as a full-on "masala" commercial entertainer. Other than the casting and genre, the makers refused to divulge further details. In early August 2012, it was confirmed by director Rajkumar Santoshi that he had been offered the film along with actor Arpit Sharma and that he had been in talks for the previous six months. Soon after, when asked, Kapoor confirmed he had not yet signed on for the film, but was on the verge of doing so. It was also reported at the time that actress Diana Penty had been signed on as the female lead, though Ileana D'Cruz later replaced her. Actress Padmini Kolhapure has been signed on to play the role of Kapoor's mother in the film. It was later revealed that newcomer Deepika Kamainah will play an important role alongside Shahid Kapoor and Ileana D'Cruz.

== Music ==
Phata Poster Nikhla Hero

Soundtrack album by Pritam
- Released: 10 September 2013
- Recorded: 2013
- Genre: Film soundtrack
- Length: 39:14
- Labels: Tips Music; Zee Music

Pritam chronology
Once Upon Ay Time in Mumbai Dobaara! (2013)	Phata Poster Nikhla Hero (2013)	R... Rajkumar (2013)

Singles from Phata Poster Nikhla Hero
- 1. "Tu Mere Agal Bagal Hai" Released: 26 July 2013; 2. "Main Rang Sharbaton Ka" Released: 26 August 2013

The songs were composed by Pritam, with lyrics penned by Irshad Kamil and Amitabh Bhattacharya. The first song, "Tu Mere Agal Bagal Hai", was released on 26 July. The song is sung by Mika Singh.

"Hey Mr DJ" is a club song sung by Benny Dayal, Shefali Alvares and Shalmali Kholgade. The song "Main Rang Sharbaton Ka" is sung by Atif Aslam and Chinmayi, and the Reprise version of "Main Rang Sharbaton Ka" is sung by Arijit Singh. "Dhating Naach" is another number featuring Nargis Fakhri and sung by Neha Kakkar and Nakash Aziz. Another Version of the song was sung by Shefali Alvares and Nakash Aziz but it was not included in the official jukebox. Songs are arranged by Vishal S.

The film score was composed by Raju Singh.

No.	Title	Artist(s)	Length
1.	"Tu Mere Agal Bagal Hai"	Mika Singh	4:25
2.	"Main Rang Sharbaton Ka"	Atif Aslam & Chinmayi Sripada	4:26
3.	"Hey Mr. DJ"	Benny Dayal, Shalmali Kholgade, Shefali Alvares & Ishq Bector (Rap)	4:22
4.	"Mere Bina Tu"	Rahat Fateh Ali Khan	4:11
5.	"Dhating Naach"	Nakash Aziz & Neha Kakkar	3:10
6.	"Janam Janam"	Atif Aslam	4:48
7.	"Main Rang Sharbaton Ka" (Reprise)	Arijit Singh	4:38
8.	"Janam Janam" (Reprise)	Sunidhi Chauhan	3:06
9.	"Mere Bina Tu" (Film Version)	Rahat Fateh Ali Khan & Harshdeep Kaur	4:23
10.	"Janam Janam" (Sad)	Atif Aslam	1:45
Total length:			39:14

== Critical response ==
=== India ===
Taran Adarsh gave the film 3.5/5 and wrote, "Phata Poster Nikhla Hero brings back memories of old-fashioned comic entertainers. There's not much of a plot here, but you go with the flow without making much effort. You laugh, celebrate the silly gags and by the time the story reaches its conclusion, you realize that the film has won you over with its unfussy plot and basic characters, who don't have a serious bone in their body. On the whole, Phata Poster Nikhla Hero is an entertainer all the way. If you relished Ajab Prem Ki Ghazab Kahani from the team of Taurani and Santoshi, chances are you will also lap up this vibrant, kaleidoscopic, light-hearted entertainer."

Madureeta Mukherjee of The Times of India gave the film 3.5 and felt, "The first half offers loads of cackles, chuckles, witticisms and spoofy scenes. Post-interval the comedy collapses for a bit with forced OTT drama, khaali-peeli action, and too many song breaks, but makes a comeback with delightfully funny moments. This one's worth it for the 'howlarity' of it all. And Shahid in his element. Note: You may not like this film if you don't have a taste for silly humour & mindless gags!"

Faheem Ruhani of India Today gave the film 3 and judged, "Santoshi as writer, director and the dialogue writer is in good form. He would have been terrific if could have captured your interest in the same way as he did in the first half of the film. Still, the film is worth more than a few laughs. More because of the way the director spoofs Bollywood's tried and tested conventions and the jokes he cracks at the expense of an industry he is only too familiar with."

Rummana Ahmed of Yahoo! Movies awarded the film 3 stars and summarised, "Phata Poster Nikhla Hero will entertain if you are willing to overlook its little indulgences." This film was declared flop by Box Office India.
