= Hard Kaur =

British-Indian rapper (born 1979)

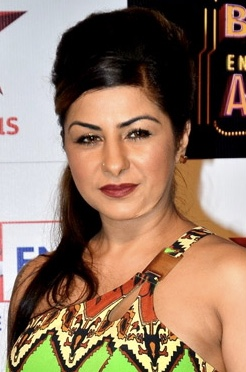
- Hard Kaur at the BIG Star Entertainment Awards 2014
- Born: 29 July 1979 (age 47); Kanpur, Uttar Pradesh, India
- Citizenship: United Kingdom
- Occupations: Singer; songwriter; actress
- Musical career
- Origin: Birmingham, England
- Genres: Rap, hip-hop, Bollywood
- Instrument: Vocals
- Years active: 1995–2019
- Label: Sony Music

Taran Kaur Dhillon (born 29 July 1979), known by her stage name Hard Kaur, is a British-Indian rapper, singer and actress in the Bollywood industry.

== Early life and influences ==
Hard Kaur was born in Kanpur, Uttar Pradesh, India on 29 July 1979 as Taran Kaur Dhillon into a Punjabi Jatt Sikh family of the Dhillon clan. She was raised in Kanpur, where her mother ran a small beauty parlour in the house. Her father was killed by a mob during 1984 anti-Sikh violence. Her paternal grandparents asked her mother to leave their house and wanted to keep her brother with them. Subsequently she, her brother and her mother moved to Hoshiarpur, Punjab, India to her maternal grandparents house, where they stayed for the next couple of years.

In 1991, her mother remarried a British citizen and her family moved to Birmingham, England, where her mother started working and studying to eventually open a beauty salon, in Smethwick. Meanwhile, Hard Kaur did her schooling as an Indian immigrant in the UK. After developing interest in hip-hop, she started her music career as a rapper. Kaur has described KRS-One, Mos Def, Busta Rhymes, Wu-Tang Clan and Nas as major influences. British-Indian rapper Panjabi MC gave her the stage name "Hard Kaur".

== Career ==
Although she had already performed at the well-known music festivals including the Glastonbury Festival, Kaur's breakthrough came with the song "Ek Glassy" with the Asian hip-hop group Sona Family. In 2007, she rapped on the song "Paisa Phek (Move Your Body)" from the soundtrack of Johnny Gaddaar. Kaur became well known for featuring as a rapper in Hindi-film soundtracks like Ugly Aur Pagli ("Talli"), Singh Is Kinng ("Bas Ek Kinng"), Kismat Konnection, Bachna Ae Haseeno, Ram Gopal Varma Ki Aag, Ajab Prem Ki Ghazab Kahani, and Prince. Her first solo album, Supawoman, was released in 2007.

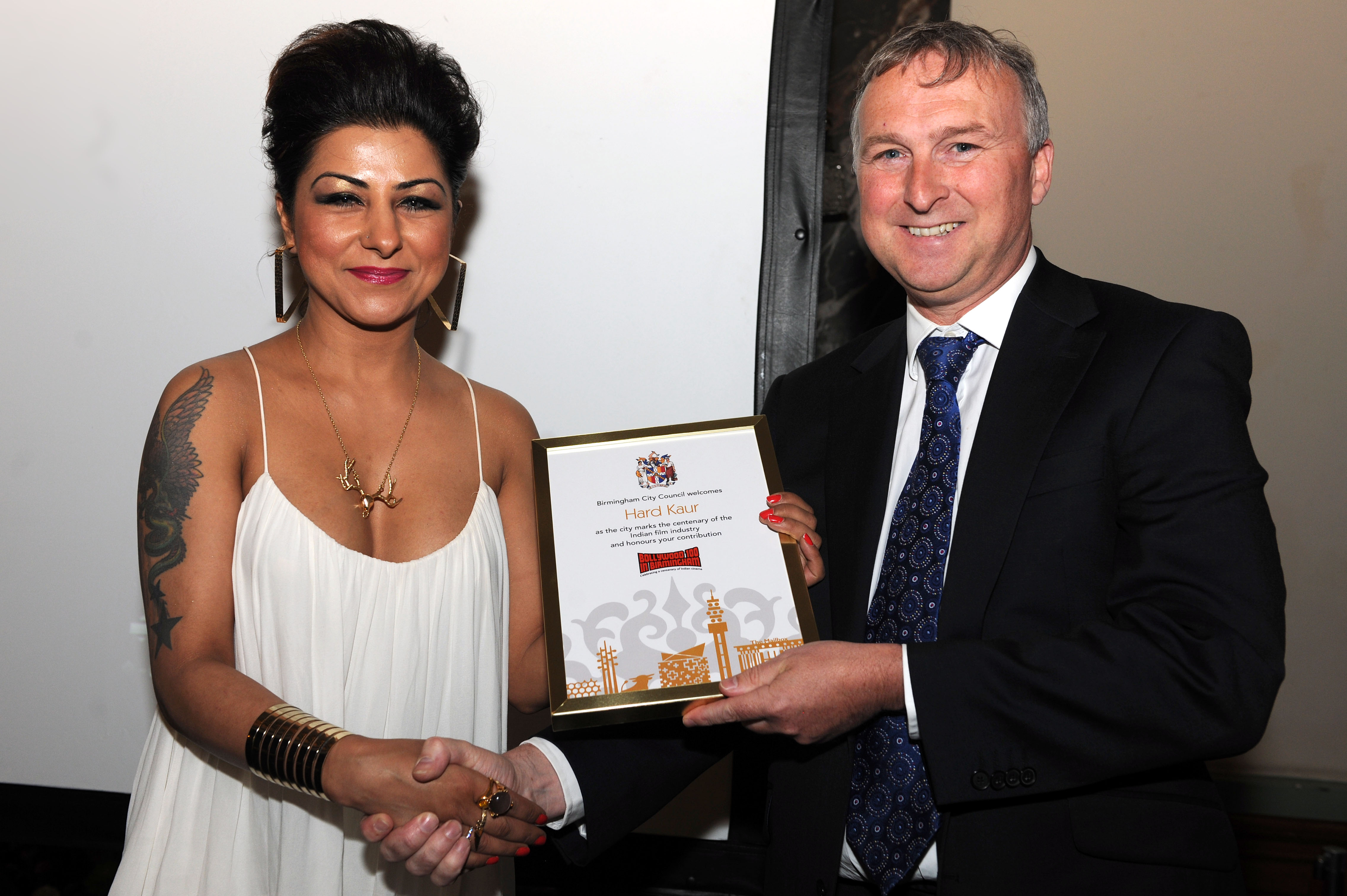
Hard Kaur with a Birmingham City Councillor, 2013.

Kaur performed at Live Earth India, 2008. In the same year, Hard Kaur was nominated for two awards at the UK Asian Music Awards: "Best Urban Act" and "Best Female Act". She won "Best Female Act".

In October 2012, Hard Kaur released her second album titled Party Loud All Year: P.L.A.Y. The album, produced in collaboration with Sony Music India, featured ten songs, all of which were written and composed by her. The most successful song of the album was "Mujhe Peeney Do".

In 2013, she collaborated with composer Ram Sampath and Rajasthani folk singer Bhanvari Devi for Coke Studio India. The song, "Kattey", features a mashup of a Rajasthani folk song dedicated to Lord Krishna (Saanwariyo) and a rap segment by Hard Kaur, written by herself in which she express her personal life journey. The song was further used in the trailer for the 2015 film, Angry Indian Goddesses.

During the 2014 elections in India, she composed a song, "Karle Tu Voting", to spread awareness about voting. Hard Kaur composed a song during the 2014 FIFA World Cup named "Goal Mar Goal Mar". The song describes fan frenzy and is sung in Hindi, Punjabi and Bengali. She has also written the lyrics for the song. She also collaborated with the American hip-hop group D12 in the same year, on the track "Desi Dance".

Her last work in Bollywood was her contribution to the soundtrack of the 2017 film Ok Jaanu. She then released a mixtape in the same year, titled The Rising Mixtape, Vol. 1. She collaborated with over 30 different artists on the project, including rappers Shah Rule and Tony Sebastian. She also released a documentary which focused on the making of the project. She also won the MTV Europe Music Award for Best India Act at the 2017 MTV Europe Music Awards. She further released the song "Poison" in February 2019, which focused on campaigning for equal rights for the LGBTQ community. The song was the lead single from her third album, The Private Album, which released the following month.

She has since distanced herself from the entertainment industry and started a YouTube channel for tarot card reading.

== Controversial comments ==
Hard Kaur is originally from Kanpur, India; where she was born and raised and currently lives in the UK, in Birmingham, England as an Indian national and citizen. She has expressed her support for the Sikh-separatist Khalistan movement on multiple occasions in videos, while criticizing the current Indian Prime Minister Narendra Modi, the current Indian Home Minister Amit Shah, their supporters and followers, the Indian government, Hindu nationalists, the BJP party and the RSS. (Note: Attributed to multiple references)

In June 2019, a First Information Report was lodged against her for comments about Yogi Adityanath and Mohan Bhagwat. In August 2019, her Twitter account was suspended after she posted a video abusing Amit Shah and Narendra Modi with Khalistan Supporters.

Kaur released a song and music video in 2019 after the abrogation of Article 370 of the Constitution of India by the Government of India which revoked the special status of the Jammu and Kashmir state of India; supporting Kashmiri-Separatism in India, in which she called herself a 'proud Khalistani'.

Kaur released an Instagram video in 2020 calling Indian people "naked, hungry, dirty, idiots, illiterate, uneducated mother****ers".

In a now deleted video that Kaur uploaded on Instagram and Twitter, she slut-shamed Bollywood actresses, accusing them of 'sleeping their way to the top' and mocking the Indian #MeToo movement victims who spoke out against their perpetrators, who were mostly film directors, producers and senior actors by insinuating that they're lying and they asked for it and that they knew very-well about Bollywood's casting couch in advance.

== Discography ==
=== EPs ===
- Voodoo Hill (1997)

=== Albums ===
- Supawoman (2007)
- Party Loud All Year: P.L.A.Y (2012)
- The Private Album (2019)

=== Mixtapes ===
- The Rising Mixtape, Vol. 1 (2017)

=== Film soundtracks ===
Year	Film	Song	Language	Notes
2007	Johnny Gaddar	Move Your Body	Hindi	Special appearance in music video
2008	Kismat Konnection	Move Your Body	Hindi	
2008	Bachna Ae Haseeno	Lucky Boy	Hindi	
2008	Ugly Aur Pagli	Tali	Hindi	
2009	Ajab Prem Ki Ghazab Kahani	Follow Me	Hindi	
2009	Ajab Prem Ki Ghazab Kahani	Main Tera Dhadkan	Hindi	
2011	Patiala House	Laung Da Lashkara	Hindi	Also acted in her first feature film role as Komal Chatwal
2011	Patiala House	Rola Pae Gaya	Hindi	Also acted in her first feature film role as Komal Chatwal
2011	F.A.L.T.U.	Char Baj Gaye	Hindi	
2011	F.A.L.T.U.	Faltu Title Track	Hindi	
2013	ABCD: Any Body Can Dance	Sadda Dil Vi Tu (Ga Ga Ga Ganpati)	Hindi	
2013	Gippi	We Are Like This Only	Hindi	
2013	Vanakkam Chennai	Chennai City Gangsta	Tamil	
2014	Babloo Happy Hai	Babloo Happy Hai	Hindi	
2014	The Shaukeens	Aashique Mizaz	Hindi	Composer
2015	Dilliwali Zaalim Girlfriend	Zaalim Dilli	Hindi	
2016	Sarrainodu	Sarrainodu	Telugu	
2017	OK Jaanu	Kaara Fankaara	Hindi	

== Filmography ==
Year	TV show	Language	Notes
2009	Jhalak Dikhhla Jaa 3	Hindi	Contestant
2010	Comedy Circus Ke Taansen	Hindi	Special appearance with Krushna Abhishek and Sudesh Lehri
2012	Bigg Boss 6	Hindi	Guest
2016	Box Cricket League	Hindi	Player in Ahmedabad Express

== See also ==
- List of British Sikhs
