= Mubarik Mubarik =

Song by Coke Studio

Single by Atif Aslam and Banur's Band

from the album Coke Studio S12E3
- Language: Balochi, Punjabi
- Released: 8 November 2019
- Studio: Coke Studio
- Genre: Pakistani pop
- Length: 6:09
- Label: Coke Studio (Pakistan)
- Composer: Usman Withd
- Lyricists: Atif Aslam and Chakar Baloch
- Producers: Coca-Cola and Rohail Hyatt

Mubarik Mubarik (Urdu: مبارک مبارک transl. Blessings and congratulations) is a Balochi and Punjabi-language song sung by Atif Aslam and Banur band performed in season 12 (episode three) of Coke Studio Pakistan. The Balochi lyrics are traditional folk verses while the Punjabi lyrics were penned by Atif Aslam.

The lyrics of the song are a mix of two aspects of Balochi music and poetry, 'haalo (come) and naazek (celebrate)'. The song is about celebration, and showcases Baloch culture. The song, musically includes a Balochi counterpart of Eastern Classical raags.

Atif Aslam said:

This is my favourite composition of the season, and when I heard it, I immediately said I have to do this. I think this is an instinct that one has that says, I want this, I want to do this and I think I can add value to it.

== Credits ==
- Song – Mubarik Mubarik
- Artists – Atif Aslam & Banur's Band
- Starring – Atif Aslam, SM Baloch, Chakar Baloch & Usman Withd
- Lyricists – Atif Aslam & Chakar Baloch
- Composer – Usman Withd
- Producer – Rohail Hyatt
- Label – Coke Studio

== See also ==
- Tajdar-e-Haram
- Aaye Kuch Abr
