= Main Rang Sharbaton Ka =

Song performed by Pritam

- Cover of the song, featuring actors Shahid Kapoor and Ileana D'Cruz

Single by Pritam feat. Atif Aslam, Chinmayi and Arijit Singh

from the album Phata Poster Nikhla Hero
- Released: 26 August 2013
- Genre: Filmi • Indian pop
- Length: 4:22
- Label: Tips Music
- Songwriter: Irshad Kamil

Main Rang Sharbaton Ka (transl. I'm colour of the sherbet) is a romantic Hindi song from the 2013 Hindi film, Phata Poster Nikhla Hero. Composed by Pritam Chakraborty, the song is sung by the Pakistani singer Atif Aslam and Chinmayi, with lyrics penned by Irshad Kamil. The soundtrack of the album consists of a reprise version of the song rendered by Arijit Singh. The music video of the track features actors Shahid Kapoor and Ileana D'Cruz.

== Background ==
The song is rendered by Atif Aslam and Chinmayi. Aslam had previously sung for the actor Shahid Kapoor in "Bakhuda Tumhi Ho" from Kismat Konnection (2008). Chinmayi provided vocals for Ileana D'Cruz. In the song, Illeana is seen in a range of costumes; a total of seven. The song is shot in Cape Town and a part of the song is picturised in Victoria Wharf. The background of the song is kept colourful, decorated with kaleidoscopic colours, which goes according to the theme of the song.

The song is mixed and mastered by Eric Pillai. It is composed by Pritam. Maracas is used throughout the song and mild guitar with percussion instrument were also used in the composition of the song. The tune of the song is layered with orchestra and the composition is kept simple.

== Release and response ==
The official music was released on 26 August 2013 by Tips Music on YouTube. It was later released as a single on 29 August 2013. The song along with other tracks in the album were available on music-streaming platforms and for digital download on 10 September 2013.

The song was positioned at 5 in "Times poll – 13 Best romantic songs" published by The Times of India.

== Critical reception ==
The song received mostly favourable reviews from music critics.

The Times of India's Bryan Durham picked the track as the best song from the album and felt that everything about the song is 'pitch-perfect'. Joginder Tuteja of Rediff.com felt that the simplicity in the tune of the song and the vocals by Aslam and Chinmayi is what hooks the listener in the song. Sankhayan Ghosh of The Indian Express commented: "To give credit where it's due, the hook line is melodic, but the rest sounds too formulaic to leave a lasting impression", adding that the song resembles of "Tera Hone Laga Hoon" from Ajab Prem Ki Ghazab Kahani.

Mohar Basu of Koimoi thought that Atif Aslam and Chinmayi did a spectacular job, but criticised the song for having a 'flimsy feel' to it.

== Reprise version ==
A reprise version of the song was included on the soundtrack, composed and written by Pritam and Irshad Kamil respectively. The version is sung by Arijit Singh. It was released along with other tracks in the soundtrack of the album on 10 September 2013. The version has the same composition as of the original but a slight change in lyrics in the second antara.

=== Critical reception ===
Mohar Basu of Koimoi thought the version is surprisingly much better than the original version, though The Times of India's Bryan Durham found the version 'pale' compare to the original. Joginder Tuteja of Rediff.com found the sole male version of the song by Singh, equally 'good'. Sankhayan Ghosh of The Indian Express commented: "Here, Arijit definitely betters it making it a much more pleasant listen than Aslam's labored vocals.

== Accolades ==
Year	Award	Nominee	Category	Result	Ref
2014	9th Renault Star Guild Awards	Chinmayi	Best Female Playback Singer	Nominated	
