= Subah Aye Na =

2026 studio album by Atif Aslam

- Album cover

Studio album by Atif Aslam
- Released: 31 July 2026
- Genre: Pop/Rock
- Length: 32:16
- Languages: Urdu; Punjabi
- Producer: Atif Aslam

Atif Aslam chronology
Meri Kahani (2008)	Subah Aye Na (2026)

Subah Aye Na (Urdu: صبح آئے نہ) is the fourth studio album by Pakistani singer Atif Aslam. Released on 31 July 2026, it is his first studio album in 18 years since Meri Kahani (2008).

== Background and release ==
During a concert at the O2 Arena London in 2026, Atif Aslam announced his fourth studio album. The album's release date was later announced as 31 July 2026, after more than 18 years and 6 months since his 2008 album Meri Kahani.

On 20 July 2026, Aslam unveiled the album title, cover artwork and complete eight-track listing through his official Instagram account. The announcement was subsequently reported by media outlets.

Ahead of the album's release, Aslam described Subah Aye Na as a representation of "freeing myself from the chaos and meeting my real self".

In interviews before the album's release, Aslam described Subah Aye Na as a personal project focused on rediscovering his artistic identity after years of touring and commercial work. He stated that he "went back to zero" to reconnect with himself as a musician and create music driven by personal expression rather than external expectations.

Aslam said he avoided rushing the album, allowing the music to develop naturally. He explained that the album represented a return to the musical identity that shaped his earlier solo work and its title reflected his belief in hope, faith and new beginnings.

== Track listing ==
Subah Aye
No.	Title	Writer(s)	Length
1.	"Subah Aye Na"	Atif Aslam	5:23
2.	"Safar Main Hu"	Raj Ranjodh	3:23
3.	"Sachay Waday"	Leo Twins	4:36
4.	"Let's Have Some Fun"	Ahsan Parvez Mehdi	3:25
5.	"Hun Ishq Main"	Raj Ranjodh	5:48
6.	"Char Yaar"	Omar Ahmed	3:07
7.	"Sun Sajna"	Atif Aslam	3:20
8.	"Ishq"	Bulleh Shah	3:14
Total length:			32:16

The track order and durations are based on the digital release listing on Spotify.

== Music videos ==
The album's first music video was released for "Hun Ishq Main" on 30 August 2026. The video stars Atif Aslam and Yumna Zaidi, marking their first on-screen collaboration, and was directed by Saife Hassan. The official music video was released on YouTube on 30 August 2026.

The second music video, "Safar Main Hu", was released on 31 October 2026. Directed by Asim Hussain, the video was inspired by a childhood experience of Atif chasing a rainbow on his bicycle. The singer shared the anecdote in the video's description on YouTube.

== Contributors ==
=== Vocals ===
- Atif Aslam – vocals, producer

=== Songwriting and composition ===
- Raj Ranjodh – lyrics and composition on "Safar Main Hu"; lyrics and composition on "Hun Ishq Main"
- Leo Twins – composition and programming on "Sachay Waday"
- Ahsan Parvez Mehdi – composition on "Let's Have Some Fun", "Char Yaar", "Sun Sajna" and "Ishq"
- Omar Ahmed – lyrics on "Char Yaar"
- Bulleh Shah – original poetry on "Ishq"

=== Production and technical ===
- Zain Ali – programming on "Subah Aye Na"; bass guitar on "Safar Main Hu"
- Shiraz Uppal – arrangement and programming on "Hun Ishq Main"
- Ahsan Parvez Mehdi – recording engineer and programming on "Let's Have Some Fun", "Sun Sajna" and "Ishq"; producer, recording engineer and programming on "Char Yaar"
- Leo Twins – programming on "Sachay Waday"
