= Baarishein =

Song performed by Arko

Single by Atif Aslam
- Language: Hindi
- Released: 13 February 2019
- Studio: AMV Studios
- Genre: Indian pop
- Length: 4:10
- Label: T-Series
- Composer: Arko Pravo Mukherjee
- Lyricist: Arko Pravo Mukherjee
- Producer: Bhushan Kumar

Atif Aslam singles chronology
"12 Bajay" (2018)	"Baarishein" (2019)	"Pardadari" (2019)

Baarishein (transl. Rainfalls) is a 2019 romantic and ballad Hindi song, written and composed by Arko Pravo Mukherjee and sung by Pakistani singer Atif Aslam. The music video of the track features Atif and Nushrat Bharucha. The song has also the use of Piano and Violin.

== Release ==
The music video was released on 14 February 2019 by T-Series on YouTube. The single received more than a million views within 5 hours of its release on YouTube. It has received 36 million views on YouTube as of August 2020.

Nushat Bharucha said before the release on song.

I am very excited for this collaboration. I love Atif as an artist and I am very fond of his music. So I am hoping that the audience will like our work together.

== Music video ==
The song is about heartbreak pain. According to Mid-Day report, this song is produced by T-Series. Atif has to endure the pain of a relationship that is no longer happy. Atif and Nushrat together, remember the happy times of their love and show how this relationship breaks down.

The music video of the song was shot in Los Angeles by Davide Zennie. This was first single music video of Nushrat Bharucha.

=== Video credits ===
- Starring – Atif Aslam and Nushrat Bharucha
- Director – David Zennie
- Location – Los Angeles

== Problems with release ==
Atif revealed this song a day before Pulwama attack. But after the attack, the MNS asked all music companies to stop working with Pakistani artist. As a result, T-Series removed the songs from YouTube. Most pakistani performers are banned from India and due to public backlash song was trashed ;though Nusrat & Arko, the musician composer were sympathised and widely regarded and acclaimed for their efforts. Arko went on the become major successful musician.

== Credits ==
- Programming and Arrangement – Aditya Dev
- Guitars – Krishna Pradhan
- Guitars recorded by Rahul Sharma at AMV studios
- Harpejji – Aditya Dev
- Mix and Master – Aditya Dev
