= The Dubai Stars =

Walk of fame

- Established: 2019; 7 years ago
- Location: Sheikh Mohammed bin Rashid Boulevard, Downtown Dubai, Dubai
- Type: Entertainment hall of fame
- Website: Official website

The Dubai Stars is a walk of fame along the pavement of the Sheikh Mohammed bin Rashid Boulevard in Downtown Dubai. It opened in October 2019 with 400 stars and is planned to reach 10,000.

== Stars ==
The following is a list of known stars:

- Ahlam (singer)
- Khabib Nurmagomedov
- Elie Saab
- Mo Salah
- Zhao Liying
- Idris Elba
- Haifa Wehbe
- Will Smith
- Zhang Ziyi
- Chris Martin
- Leonardo DiCaprio
- Abdel Halim Hafez
- Aamir Khan
- Robert Downey Jr.
- Rami Malek
- Usain Bolt
- Serena Williams
- Nile Rogers
- Priyanka Chopra
- Chris Hemsworth
- Daft Punk
- Chris Evans
- Virat Kohli
- Nancy Ajram
- Zachary Levi
- Ni Ni
- Exo
- Fayrouz
- Ranveer Singh
- Dwayne Johnson
- Jackie Chan
- Shah Rukh Khan
- Lionel Messi
- Shilpa Shetty
- Gibran Kahlil Gibran
- Abdul Majeed Abdullah
- Mahendra Singh Dhoni
- BTS
- Sergio Ramos
- Adnan Al Talyani
- Mohammad Al-Shalhoub
- Amitabh Bachchan
- Stephen Chow
- Amr Diab
- Armin van Buuren
- Hussain Al Jassmi
- Sania Mirza
- Hu Ge
- Riyad Mahrez
- Gulzar
- Ranbir Kapoor
- Valentina Shevchenko
- Kylian Mbappé
- Houriya Al Taheri
- Maisoon Al Saleh
- Hala Kazim
- Sara Al Madani
- Atif Aslam
- Deepika Padukone
- Casey Neistat
- Sonam Kapoor
- Babar Azam
- Abdullah Shafique
- Fakher Zaman
- Cristiano Ronaldo
- Abdullah Wasiq
- Khalid Al Ameri
