= Woh Mere Bin =

2020 Hindi song

Single by Atif Aslam
- Language: Hindi
- Released: 21 April 2020
- Recorded: 2007
- Genre: Indian pop
- Length: 3:53
- Label: Tips Music
- Songwriter: Sachin Gupta
- Producer: Kumar S. Taurani

Atif Aslam singles chronology
| "Baarishein" (2019) | "Woh Mere Bin" (2020) |

Woh Mere Bin (transl. He/She without me) is a 2020 Hindi song written by Sachin Gupta and sung by the Pakistani singer Atif Aslam.

== Background ==
Kumar Taurani owner of Tips said: “Tips has released a 10 year-old song sung by Atif Aslam. This song is a rare gem that lost its way a long time ago. It’s a song that we have had since a decade with Atif Aslam but somehow we kept pushing the release forward, but during this quarantine we got an opportunity to officially release the song."

== Music video ==
Teaser was released on 19 April 2020 by Tips Musicon YouTube. Music video was released on 21 April 2020 and has over 7 million views on YouTube as of August 2020. It features Atif Aslam (singing) and Sachin Gupta (playing the guitar). As it was released during COVID-19 pandemic, Therefore, it ends with the positive message "Be Safe, Be Positive" and "Please Stay Home".

== Credits ==
Credits adapted from YouTube.

- Song – Woh Mere Bin
- Singer – Atif Aslam
- Music Director & Lyricist – Sachin Gupta
- Producer – Kumar S. Taurani
- Label – Tips Music
