= Coke Studio Pakistan season 12 =

Twelfth television season of Coke Studio Pakistan

Coke Studio Pakistan
- Season 12
- Season 12 poster
- Starring: Vocalists
- No. of episodes: 7

Release
- Original network: YouTube
- Original release: October 11 – November 29, 2019

Season chronology
- ← Previous; Season 11 Next → Season 13

The twelfth season of the Pakistani music television series Coke Studio Pakistan commenced airing on 11 October 2019, and concluded on 29 November 2019. The season was produced by Rohail Hyatt, after Ali Hamza and Zohaib Kazi stepped down from the role after just one season. Coca-Cola Pakistan remained as an executive producer.

== Artists ==
=== Vocalists ===
- Abrar-ul-Haq
- Aima Baig
- Ali Sethi
- Atif Aslam
- Banur's Band
- Barkat Jamal Fakir Troupe
- Fareed Ayaz and Abu Muhammad
- Fariha Pervez
- Hadiqa Kiani
- Harsakhiyan
- Kashif Din
- Nimra Rafiq
- Qurat-ul-Ain Balouch
- Rachel Viccaji
- Rahat Fateh Ali Khan
- Sahir Ali Bagga
- Sanam Marvi
- Shahab Hussain
- Shamali Afghan
- Shuja Haider
- Umair Jaswal
- Zeb Bangash
- Zoe Viccaji

=== Musicians ===
Season 12 featured Coke Studio's first female house band member Abier "Veeru" Shan in the role multi-percussionist.

House Band
- Dholak & Tabla: Babar Khanna
- Drum: Kami Paul
- Guitar: Zain Ali & Sarmad Ghafoor
- Keyboard: Varqa Faraid
- Bass: Kamran (Mannu) Zafar
- Percussion: Abier "Veeru" Shan, Aziz Kazi & Hassan Mohiyuddin

Backing Vocals
- Mehr Qadir
- Nimra Rafiq
- Shahab Hussain
- Rachel Viccaji

Guest Musicians
- Flute: Sajid Ali
- Guitar: Omran Shafique
- Bass guitar: Syed Saif Abbas
- Rubab: Sadiq Sameer
- Harmonium: Shahzad Ali
- Tabla: Fazal Abbas
- Khamach: Shakoor Faqeer
- Banjo: Noor Baksh

Guest Musicians (Troupe)
- Balochi Troupe: Mohammad BuxAaharr, Shaihan Khan, Shehzad Sardar & Taj Muhammad Buledi
- K.P.K Troupe: Abdul Majid, Fazal Kareem, Khurshid & Zafar Ali
- Sindhi Troupe: Mevo Khan, Muhammad Talib, Roshan Ali & Shoukat Ali Faqeer

== Production ==
Following middling reviews and dwindling television rating points of subsequent seasons, Rohail Hyatt, the founder of the show, returned as the producer after 5 years. The series was produced under Rohail Hyatt's production company Frequency Media and was distributed by Coca-Cola Pakistan.

Speaking at the launch of Coke Studio Season 12, Rohail Hyatt said:

In a world where there are multitudes of information, sounds and conversations to choose from, Coke Studio wishes to offer a space where one can contemplate the reverberations of a single guitar strum or the notes of a few piano keys. Traveling down the ladder of time, from the courts of the Delhi Sultanate and the music studios of pre-revolution Iran, through mountains and valleys, much like the water that trickles down from a natural spring, music came to Coke Studio’s canvas. At its core, Coke Studio remains an offering, a space where we share what has come to us, welcome to those who wish to join us on this continuing journey of exploration.

— Rohail Hyatt, producer Coke Studio

General Manager of Coca-Cola Pakistan, Rizwan U. Khan said,

“Coca-Cola Pakistan is committed to share the values of unity and harmony through the universal language of music that transcends any cultural barriers or boundaries. With more than a decade of musical legacy with Coke Studio, we will keep striving to carry forward this beacon of hope and celebration through our firm belief in the power of music.”

== Episodes ==
No. overall	Song Title	Artist(s)	Lyricist(s)	Language(s)	Original release date
Season Opener
68	"Wohi Khuda Hai"	Atif Aslam	Muzaffar Warsi	Arabic & Urdu	October 11, 2019
Episode 1
69	"Dam Mastam"	Rahat Fateh Ali Khan	Rahat Fateh Ali Khan	Arabic, Persian & Punjabi	October 18, 2019
69	"Ram Pam"	Shahab Hussain & Zoe Viccaji	Sahir Ali Bagga	Punjabi & Urdu	October 18, 2019
69	"Maahi Diyaan Jhokaan"	Barkat Jamal Fakir Troupe	Khush Khair Muhammad & Sacchal Sarmast	Saraiki	October 18, 2019
Episode 2
70	"Billo"	Abrar-ul-Haq	Abrar-ul-Haq	English & Punjabi	October 25, 2019
70	"Saiyaan"	Rachel Viccaji & Shuja Haider	Punjabi folklore	Punjabi & Saraiki	October 25, 2019
70	"Roshe"	Zeb Bangash	Habba Khatoon & Ghulam Ahmad Mahjoor	Kashmiri	October 25, 2019
Episode 3
71	"Chal Raha Hoon"	Umair Jaswal	Umair Jaswal	Urdu	November 8, 2019
71	"Mubarik Mubarik"	Atif Aslam & Banur's Band	Traditional folk & Atif Aslam	Balochi & Punjabi	November 8, 2019
71	"Aadam"	Fareed Ayaz & Abu Muhammad with Humnawa	Amir Khusrau	Braj & Persian	November 8, 2019
Episode 4
72	"Gulon Main Rang"	Ali Sethi	Faiz Ahmad Faiz	Urdu	November 15, 2019
72	"Dhola"	Aima Baig & Sahir Ali Bagga	Sahir Ali Bagga	Punjabi	November 15, 2019
72	"Hairaan Hua"	Sanam Marvi	Sachal Sarmast	Braj, Saraiki & Urdu	November 15, 2019
Episode 5
73	"Balma"	Fariha Parvez	Traditional Indian	Braj	November 22, 2019
73	"Heeray"	Aima Baig & Rahat Fateh Ali Khan	Javed Ali Khan	Punjabi	November 22, 2019
73	"Daachi Waaliya"	Hadiqa Kiani	Bulleh Shah & Waris Shah	Punjabi	November 22, 2019
73	"Mram Mram"	Shamali Afghan	Khatir Afridi & Rahim Ghamzada	Pashto	November 22, 2019
Episode 6
74	"Bo Giyam"	Kashif Din & Nimra Rafiq	Nas Nafees & Sahir Ali Bagga	Burushaski & Urdu	November 29, 2019
74	"Mundiya"	Ali Sethi & Qurat-ul-Ain Balouch	Khwaja Parwez	Punjabi	November 29, 2019
74	"Aaye Kuch Abr"	Atif Aslam	Faiz Ahmad Faiz	Urdu	November 29, 2019
74	"Tiri Pawanda"	Harsakhiyan	Shaikh Ayaz	Sindhi	November 29, 2019

== Copyright issues ==
The season faced four copyright claim issues. The video of Abrar-ul-Haq's "Billo" and Shuja Haider and Rachel Viccaji's "Saiyaan", songs from Episode 2, were taken down by YouTube due to a copyright claim. Saiyaan was later restored. Sanam Marvi's "Hairaan Hua" from Episode 4 was taken down by YouTube due to a copyright claim by Abida Parveen, though it was later restored. At last Ali Sethi and Qurat-ul-Ain Balouch's "Mundiya" was taken down by YouTube from Episode 6.
