= Tere Naal Love Ho Gaya =

2012 Indian film by Mandeep Kumar

- Theatrical release poster
- Directed by: Mandeep Kumar
- Written by: Abhijeet Sandhu
- Produced by: Kumar S. Taurani; Ramesh S. Taurani; Ronnie Screwvala
- Starring: Ritesh Deshmukh; Genelia D'Souza
- Cinematography: Chirantan Das
- Edited by: Manish More
- Music by: Sachin–Jigar
- Production company: Tips Industries
- Distributed by: UTV Motion Pictures
- Release date: 24 February 2012
- Running time: 130 minutes
- Country: India
- Language: Hindi
- Budget: ₹14 crore
- Box office: ₹32.61 crore

Tere Naal Love Ho Gaya (transl. Fell in love with you) is a 2012 Indian Hindi-language romantic comedy film directed by Mandeep Kumar and produced by Kumar S. Taurani. The film stars Riteish Deshmukh and Genelia D'Souza in lead roles.

Tere Naal Love Ho Gaya was theatrically released on 24 February 2012. The film was remade in Telugu in 2014 as Ra Ra... Krishnayya.

== Plot ==
Mini is a young woman who lives off her father Bhatti's money and wealth. She hates the term "marriage." However, she is still being forced to get married by her father to Sunny, a man from a wealthy family who just wants access to Mini's Canadian Green Card. Viren is a hard-working simpleton who dreams of having his own travel agency with a fleet of cars for which he is painstakingly saving money. He works as a rickshaw driver for Bhatti and keeps his savings under the seat of his rickshaw. Bhatti sells off all his rickshaws one day – with Viren's savings of Rs. 60,000 in one of them – and buys a new fleet of cars. Viren gets drunk to drown his sorrows over his lost money; in a drunken stupor, he ends up at Bhatti's doorstep demanding his money back, while Mini's engagement to Sunny is in progress. An argument ensues, and Viren lays his hands on a pistol. Viren tells Bhatti that he is going to count to three or he is going to shoot him. Viren counts to three but misses because he is drunk.

Amidst the commotion, Mini seizes the opportunity to cancel her marriage and forces Viren to kidnap her, making him drive off in one of her father's new taxis. The spunky Mini makes a deal with Viren that he will follow her instructions and will demand a ransom of Rs 1 million (10 lakh rupees) from her father. He can then have his Rs 60,000 that he lost, and she will keep the rest as she does not want to go back home and get married. While the ransom letter is on the way to Bhatti, the two enter someone's empty home and try to make ends meet. In the process, they fall in love and are happy with each other. The story takes a twist when Sunny and Bhatti come to pay the ransom money but fool them and start firing, hoping to take Mini back. Suddenly, Mini and Viren are kidnapped by another person and taken away to the house of Chowdhary, a notorious kidnapping kingpin.

Chowdhary makes a living out of demanding ransom, and it is then revealed that Viren (alias "Chotu") is Chowdhary's son. Disapproving of his father's ways, Viren left home six years ago to work in Patiala as a rickshaw driver. Bhatti comes to pay the ransom and take her home, much to the dismay of Mini, as she loves Viren and does not want to marry Sunny. Viren's family, having grown fond of her, wants him to marry Mini. Chowdhary tells him that Mini will run the family kidnapping business when he is gone. However, Viren realises he cannot allow Mini to lead such a dishonorable life and rejects the proposal. Mini assumes Viren does not love her and leaves with a broken heart. Viren has a conversation with Chowdhary, who decides to forgo his kidnapping business for the sake of his family and decides to go after Mini. Back home, Mini goes through with the wedding ceremony as per Bhatti's wishes, believing that the man with her is Sunny, but it turns out to have been Viren all along. The two drive off back to Chowdhary's house to go where they turn the kidnapping business into a reputable taxi-driving business.

== Cast ==
- Riteish Deshmukh as Viren / Chotu Chaudhary
- Genelia D'Souza as Mini Bhatti
- Om Puri as Chaudhary
- Tinnu Anand as Mr. Bhatti
- Smita Jaykar as Mrs. Chaudhary
- Chitrashi Rawat as Dhani
- Navin Prabhakar as Naidu
- Atif Aslam in a special appearance in song "Tu Mohabbat Hai"
- Diljit Dosanjh in a special appearance in song "Pee Pa Pee Pa"
- Veena Malik in a special appearance in song "Fann Ban Gayi"
- Kartar Cheema as Sunny (Mini's fiancé)
- Gurmeet Saajan as Chaudhary's brother
- Satwant Kaur

== Soundtrack ==
Tere Naal Love Ho Gaya

Soundtrack album by Sachin–Jigar
- Released: 23 January 2012
- Genre: Film soundtrack
- Label: Tips Music Films

Sachin–Jigar chronology
Hum Tum Shabana (2011)	Tere Naal Love Ho Gaya (2012)	Kyaa Super Kool Hain Hum (2012)

The soundtrack was composed by the duo Sachin–Jigar and was released on 23 January 2012. However, the songs Piya O Re Piya and Tu Mohabbat Hai were officially released online earlier, on 7 November 2011 and 23 December 2011, respectively, thus these two songs are listed under the year 2011. The album received positive response from critics.

=== Track list ===
No.	Title	Lyrics	Singer(s)	Length
1.	"Piya O Re Piya"	Priya Panchal	Atif Aslam and Shreya Ghoshal	4:52
2.	"Jeene De"	Priya Panchal	Mohit Chauhan	5:16
3.	"Pee Pa Pee Pa"	Mayur Puri	Diljit Dosanjh and Priya Saraiya	2:30
4.	"Tu Mohabbat Hai"	Priya Panchal	Atif Aslam, Monali Thakur and Priya Saraiya	5:25
5.	"Fann Ban Gayi"	Mayur Puri	Sunidhi Chauhan and Kailash Kher	3:09
6.	"Piya O Re Piya" (Sad Version)	Priya Panchal	Atif Aslam and Priya Panchal	2:40
7.	"Pee Pa Desi Mix" (Remix By Middleman)	Mayur Puri	Diljit Dosanjh and Priya Panchal	3:44
8.	"Piya O Re Piya" (Remix by DJ Suketu With Tips Jhankar)	Priya Panchal	Atif Aslam and Shreya Ghoshal	3:05
9.	"Fann Ban Gayi (Remix)"	Mayur Puri	Sunidhi Chauhan and Kailash Kher	3:09
10.	"Tu Mohabbat Hai" (Remix by DJ Suketu)	Priya Panchal	Atif Aslam, Monali Thakur and Priya Saraiya	6:33
11.	"Jeene De" (Coffee House Version)	Priya Panchal	Mohit Chauhan	4:03
12.	"Jeene De" (Reprise Version)	Priya Panchal	Amanat Ali	5:02

== Reception ==
=== Critical response ===
The film received positive reviews from critics and audiences alike. The chemistry of the lead cast was praised. Taran Adarsh from Bollywood Hungama rated the film 3 out of 5, and added "Tere Naal Love Ho Gaya is a sweet love story which is entertaining enough to succeed critically and commercially." Times of India gave a positive review and said "With the feel-good factor working to its advantage, you might just end up saying Tere Naal Love Ho Gaya to this sweet-n-simple film." Daily News and Analysis gave 3 stars out of 5, commented "The director seems to know well the culture of Punjab and Haryana and has generously incorporated it, including the way, Genelia's fiancé brags about his money power. Filmi at times, it doesn't fail to make you smile. Fun watch with your family."

Preeti Arora from Rediff gave the movie 2.5/5, and pointed out the flaws in dialogues by Dhieyo Sandhu, even mentioning too many inane, trite, one-liners. NDTV movie reviews gave 2.5 stars out of 5, mentioning that "No extraordinary story or no unique formula, no major histrionics, yet, this romantic-comedy entertains and touches your heart."

== Awards and nominations ==
Award	Category	Recipients and nominees	Result	Ref.
5th Mirchi Music Awards	Upcoming Female Vocalist of The Year	Priya Panchal – "Piya O Re Piya (Sad)"	Nominated	
