= Kismat Konnection =

2008 Indian film by Aziz Mirza

- Theatrical release poster
- Directed by: Aziz Mirza
- Screenplay by: Sanjay Chhel; Vibha Singh; Sai Kabir
- Story by: Rahila Mirza
- Produced by: Ramesh S. Taurani; Kumar S. Taurani; Sam Abbas
- Starring: Shahid Kapoor; Vidya Balan; Juhi Chawla; Om Puri; Boman Irani; Vishal Malhotra; Karanvir Bohra; Satyanand Gaitonde
- Narrated by: Shah Rukh Khan
- Cinematography: Binod Pradhan
- Edited by: Amitabh Shukla
- Music by: Songs: Pritam; Style Bhai; Guest Composition: Sajid–Wajid; Background Score: Sanjoy Chowdhury
- Production company: Tips Industries
- Distributed by: UTV Motion Pictures
- Release date: 18 July 2008
- Country: India
- Language: Hindi

Kismat Konnection (Fate Connection) is a 2008 Indian Hindi-language romantic comedy film directed by Aziz Mirza. The film stars Shahid Kapoor and Vidya Balan with Juhi Chawla making a guest appearance. Shah Rukh Khan is the narrator. Produced by Ramesh S. Taurani under the banner of Tips Industries, Kismat Konnection was released on 18 July 2008.

== Plot ==
This is the story of Raj Malhotra, an architect. Despite being a top student at school and university, he struggled to find work, clients or projects. Everything he did seemed to go wrong. He went to see a Romani woman named Haseena Bano Jaan for advice. She told him that he either needed a good luck charm or to change his luck because he was unlucky. Subsequently, Raj met Priya Saluja, who was trying to save the community centre and help its citizens. Although they did not get along at first, Raj eventually realised that Priya was his lucky charm. She helped him out of tricky situations, changing his life for the better. However, Raj lied to Priya, telling her that he would help her save the community centre when actually he intended to build a shopping mall there to gain recognition as an architect. He also fell in love with her, and she fell for him too. When Priya found out the truth, however, she was upset. To make up for his lie, Raj sold all his possessions and quit his job. He proposed a plan to save the community centre, thereby winning back Priya's love and admiration.

== Cast ==
- Shahid Kapoor as Raj Malhotra
- Vidya Balan as Priya Saluja
- Amit Varma as Karan Bahl
- Juhi Chawla as Haseena Bano Jaan Fortune Teller (Guest appearance)
- Om Puri as Sanjeev "Harry" Gill
- Boman Irani as Rajiv Batra
- Himani Shivpuri as Mrs. Manpreet Gill
- Vishal Malhotra as Hiten Patel
- Karanvir Bohra as Dave Kataria
- Satyanand Gaitonde as Mr. Kabir Talpade
- Dimple Sharma as Rita Ghatge
- Hyder Ali as Mr. Rahul Bakshi
- Shah Rukh Khan as a Narrator

== Production ==
Kismat Konnection (in other words "Connection of Fate") was previously titled Lucky Charm. Kapoor and Balan began shooting for the film in Toronto, Canada and later continued in Mumbai. Actress Juhi Chawla played the role of a gypsy fortune-teller dressed in typical colorful bright attire.

== Release ==
This film was released on 18 July 2008.

== Soundtrack ==
Kismat Konnection

Soundtrack album by Pritam and Sajid–Wajid
- Released: 24 June 2008
- Recorded: 2008
- Studio: Tips Industries
- Genre: Film soundtrack
- Length: 45:26
- Label: Tips Industries
- Producer: Ramesh S Taurani

Pritam chronology
| Jannat (2008) | Kismat Konnection (2008) | Singh Is Kinng (2008) |

Sajid–Wajid chronology
| Welcome (2008) | Kismat Konnection (2008) | Heroes (2008) |

The music was composed by Pritam while lyrics had been written by Sayeed Quadri and Shabbir Ahmed. 'Soniye Ve' was composed by Sajid–Wajid. Remix songs were mixed by DJ Suketu and Aks. According to the Indian trade website Box Office India, with around 10,00,000 units sold, this film's soundtrack album was the year's fifteenth highest-selling. And remixes are connected style from Dance Bowling 90s.

| # | Song | Singer(s) | Duration |
|---|---|---|---|
| 1 | "Move Your Body Now" | Shaan, Akriti Kakar & Hard Kaur | 04:06 |
| 2 | "Soniye Ve" | Sonu Nigam & Sunidhi Chauhan | 04:06 |
| 3 | "Bakhuda Tumhi Ho" | Atif Aslam & Alka Yagnik | 04:52 |
| 4 | "Aai Paapi" | Neeraj Shridhar | 04:20 |
| 5 | "Is This Love" | Shreya Ghoshal & Mohit Chauhan | 05:29 |
| 6 | "Bakhuda Tumhi Ho – Fresh Mix" | Atif Aslam & Alka Yagnik | 05:46 |
| 7 | "Aai Paapi – Dance Mix" | Neeraj Shridhar | 03:45 |
| 8 | "Move Your Body Now – Hip Hop Mix" | Shaan, Adeel Chaudhry, Suhail Kaul, Hard Kaur & Akriti Kakar | 03:35 |
| 9 | "Kahin Na Laage Mann – Lounge Mix" | Shreya Ghoshal & Mohit Chauhan | 05:52 |
| 10 | "Soniye Ve – Electro Dhol Mix" | Sonu Nigam & Sunidhi Chauhan | 03:58 |
