= Doorie =

2006 studio album by Atif Aslam

Studio album by Atif Aslam, Mithoon Sharma and Sachin Gupta
- Released: 22 December 2006
- Recorded: 2005
- Genres: Pop, Pop rock
- Length: 45:12
- Language: Urdu
- Labels: Tips Music (India and overseas); The Musik Records (Pakistan)

Atif Aslam, Mithoon Sharma and Sachin Gupta chronology
Jal Pari (2004)	Doorie (2006)	Meri Kahani (2008)
External audio
- Jukebox playlist on YouTube

Doorie (Urdu: دوری, Hindi: दूरी, transl. Distance) is the second album by Pakistani singer Atif Aslam. The lyrics were written by Sameer Anjaan, Sayeed Quadri, Atif Aslam, Sachin Gupta, Uzma and Shahzad while the music was composed by Atif Aslam, Sachin Gupta and Mithoon Sharma. The single "Doorie" topped the charts in India and Pakistan.

== Performance ==
Doorie was a global success and hit, and the first international album by Atif Aslam.

It was more successful in India than Pakistan, Nepal and Bangladesh. Doorie was released simultaneously in Pakistan and India on 22 December 2006, with videos shot in Mauritius.

== Track listing ==
Doorie
No.	Title	Composer(s)	Length
1.	"Doorie"	Sachin Gupta	4:50
2.	"Ehsaas"	Atif Aslam	3:44
3.	"Hum Kis Gali"	Sachin Gupta	5:00
4.	"Kuch Is Tarah"	Mithoon Sharma, Chandra Shekhar	5:13
5.	"Mahi Ve"	Atif Aslam	4:00
6.	"Mahiya Ve Sohniya"	Sachin Gupta	4:39
7.	"Doorie (House Remix)"	Sachin Gupta	5:46
8.	"Doorie (Remix)"	Sachin Gupta	5:41
9.	"Ehsaas (Freaky Mix)"	Atif Aslam	3:47
10.	"Hum Kis Gali (Dance Mix)"	Sachin Gupta	4:20
11.	"Kuch Is Tarah (Euro Mix)"	Mithoon Sharma	5:24
12.	"Mahi Ve (Eternal Mix)"	Atif Aslam	4:30
13.	"Mahiya Ve Sohniya (Soul Mix)"	Sachin Gupta	3:03
14.	"Maula"	Sachin Gupta	3:49
15.	"O Re Piya"	Sachin Gupta	4:31
16.	"Yakeen"	Atif Aslam	4:01
17.	"O Re Piya (Trance Mix)"	Sachin Gupta	4:03
18.	"Yakeen (Club Mix)"	Atif Aslam	3:59
Total length:			45:12

== Awards ==
Year	Award	Category	Result
2007	6th Lux Style Awards	Best Album	Won
