= Meri Kahani =

2008 studio album by Atif Aslam

Studio album by Atif Aslam
- Released: 8 January 2008
- Genres: Pop, Rock
- Length: 49:13
- Languages: Urdu; Punjabi
- Labels: Fire Records (Pakistan); Tips Music (India and overseas)
- Producer: Sheraz Siddiq

Atif Aslam chronology
Doorie (2006)	Meri Kahani (2008)	Subah Aye Na (2026)
External audio
- Jukebox playlist on YouTube

After the success of his first two albums, Atif Aslam released his third solo album, Meri Kahani (Urdu: میری کہانی, transl. My Story), in 2008. The album was produced by Sarmad Abdul Ghafoor.

== Performance ==
The entire album had a darker theme. The album's song "Rabba Sacheya" is synonymous with Faiz Ahmad Faiz's poem. The song revolves around the corruption in society and poor man's struggle to survive. The album was promoted by using the song "Meri Kahani". This song is about nostalgia, old memories and childhood. The Punjabi song "Mae Ni" depicts the emotion like a folk song. "Joug" is a song about having lost everything that was precious to one. The song "Mann Hota Hai" has a simple piano-based composition.

== Track listing ==
The album was written by Atif Aslam and Shahzad Aslam. It was composed by Atif Aslam, Sheraz Siddiq, Sarmad Abdul Ghafoor, Mahmood Rahman, Sameer Shami and Farhad Humayun.

Meri Kahani
No.	Title	Length
1.	"Meri Kahani"	3:39
2.	"Kinara"	4:22
3.	"Rabba Sacheya"	4:38
4.	"Mann Hota Hai"	3:52
5.	"Joug"	5:57
6.	"Chhod Gaye"	3:31
7.	"Humrahi"	5:31
8.	"Mai Ni"	5:11
9.	"Kaun Tha: Kapkapi"	3:34
10.	"Chhod Gaye (version 2)"	3:51
11.	"Yaaro"	3:36
12.	"Hangami Halaat"	3:24
Total length:		49:13

== Awards and nominations ==
Year	Award	Work	Category	Result
2008	7th Lux Style Awards	Album	Best Album	Nominated
2009	MTV Brrr Music Awards	Hangami Halaat	Best Rock Song	Won
