= Hona Tha Pyar =

Song performed by Atif Aslam and Hadiqa Kiani

Song by Atif Aslam ft. Hadiqa Kiyani

from the album Bol
- Language: Urdu
- Released: May 26, 2011
- Genre: Romance
- Length: 4:43
- Label: Fire Records; Tips
- Composer: Ali Javed
- Lyricists: Ali Javed, Imran Raza
- Producer: Showman Productions

Hona Tha Pyar (Urdu: ہونا تھا پیار, lit. 'Love was Bound to Happen') is an Urdu language Pakistani song from the 2011 film Bol by Shoaib Mansoor. It is sung by Atif Aslam and Hadiqa Kiyani. The song was composed and written by Ali Javed. It was produced by Shiraz Uppal and picturized on Atif Aslam and Mahira Khan.

== Accolades ==
Hona Tha Pyar was nominated at various awards including Pakistan Media Awards, Lux Style Awards and PTV Awards.

| Year | Nominee / work | Award | Result |
Lux Style Awards
| 2012 | Atif Aslam and Hadiqa Kiani | Song of the Year | Nominated |
| 2012 | Atif Aslam and Hadiqa Kiani | Best Original Sound Track | Won |
Pakistan Media Awards
| 2012 | Atif Aslam and Hadiqa Kiani | Best Playback Singer | Nominated |
