= Aaye Kuch Abr =

Poem written by Faiz Ahmed Faiz

- by Faiz Ahmad Faiz
- Country: Pakistan
- Language: Urdu
- Genre: Ghazal

Aaye Kuch Abr (Urdu: آئے کُچھ ابر transl. Let some clouds come) is a poem written by famous Urdu poet Faiz Ahmad Faiz. It was written when Faiz's was confined at the Hyderabad Central Jail during the Rawalpindi conspiracy case. He was away from his wife and two daughters and spent months without seeing them. Faiz found himself misunderstood in the society he lived in. Aaye Kuch Abr is an expression of that isolation, longing but also hope.

== 2011 version ==
"Aaye Kuch Abr"

Song by Mehdi Hassan
- Language: Urdu
- Released: 2011
- Genre: Ghazal
- Length: 9:53
- Label: Vintage Pak Meodies
- Composer: Mehdi Hassan
- Lyricist: Faiz Ahmad Faiz

In 2011, this ghazal was performed (composed and sung) by Mehdi Hassan.

== 2019 version ==
"Aaye Kuch Abr"
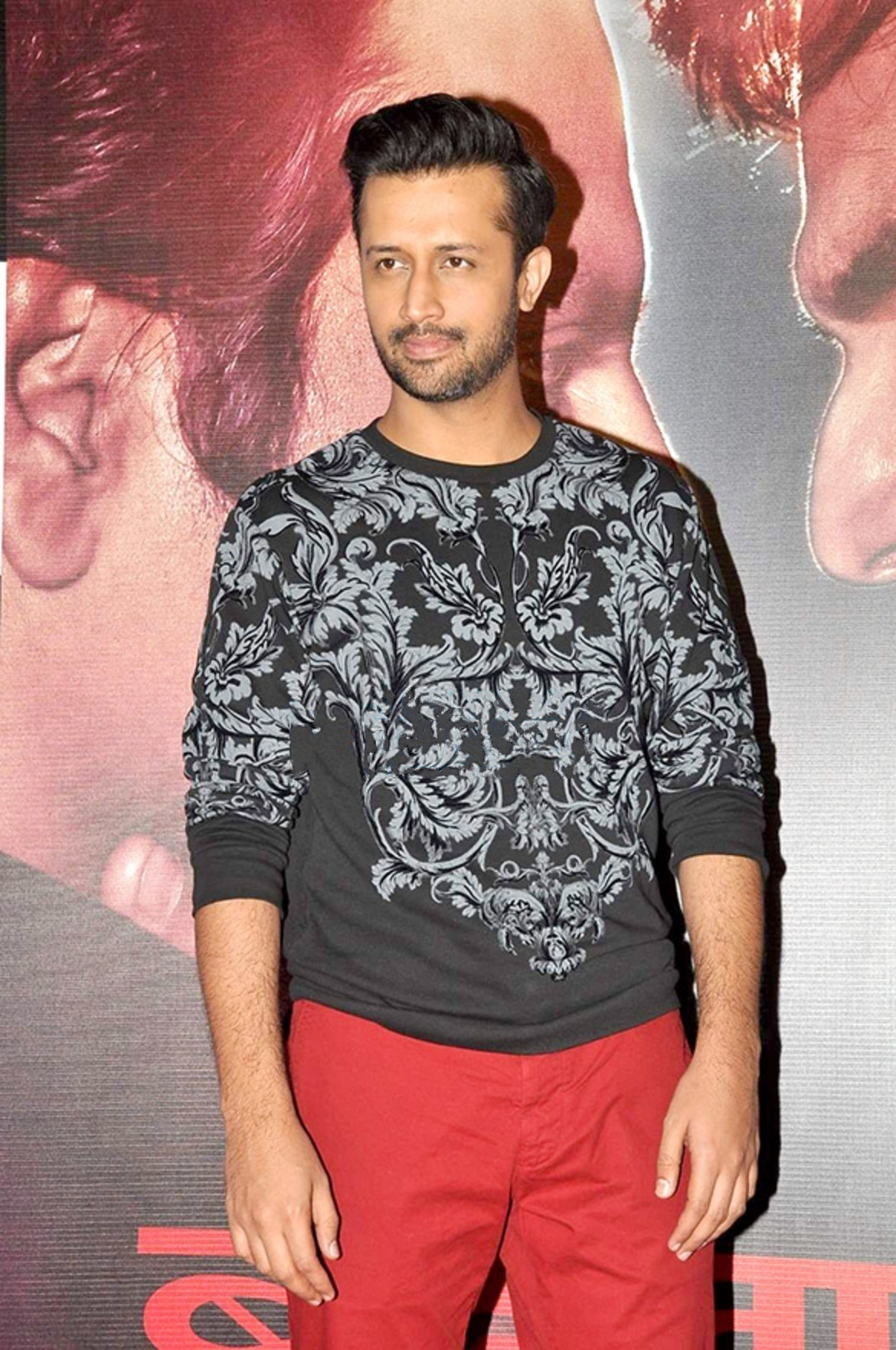
- Atif Aslam

Single by Atif Aslam

from the album Coke Studio S12E6(finale)
- Language: Urdu
- Released: 29 November 2019
- Studio: Coke Studio
- Genre: Pakistani pop
- Length: 7:12
- Label: Coke Studio (Pakistan)
- Composer: Mehdi Hassan (original)
- Lyricist: Faiz Ahmad Faiz
- Producers: Coca-Cola and Rohail Hyatt

Later, It was sung by Atif Aslam during Coke Studio season 12 episode 6 (finale), directed by Rohail Hyatt. The video was released on 27 November 2019 by Coke Studio on YouTube. It features Atif Aslam. The music video garnered over a million views in two hours of its release. It has received over 6 million on YouTube as of August 2020.

=== Reception ===
Atif said about it that “before you even touch a piece like this, you think twice. But the legends' work is not meant to be feared. Faiz Sir's way of writing is very distinctive and our minds can't truly know his poetry."

== Credits ==
- Artists: Begum Akhter (original) Mehdi Hassan (original), Atif Aslam

(Bangladeshi singer), Runa Laila

- Composed by: Mehdi Hassan
- Raga: Gaud Malhar
- Poetry by: Faiz Ahmad Faiz
- Directed and Produced by: Rohail Hyatt
- Music label: Coke Studio
