= Atif Aslam =

Pakistani playback singer, songwriter, and actor (born 1983)

Atif Aslam TI
- عاطف اسلم
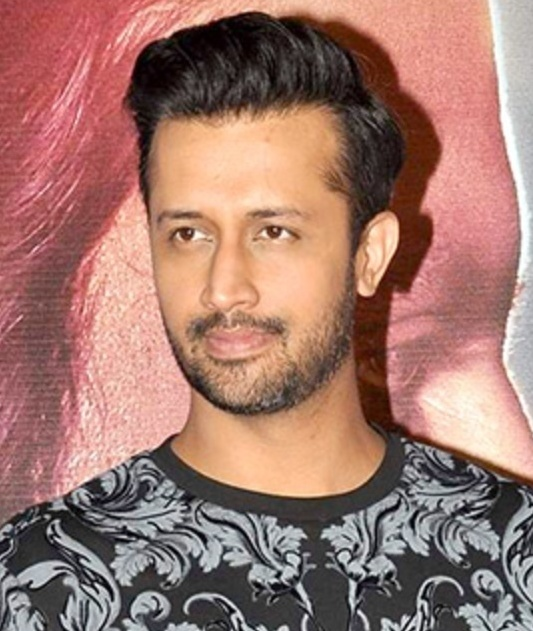
- Atif Aslam at an event for Badlapur in 2015
- Pronunciation: [ɑːt̪ɪf əsləm]
- Born: Muhammad Atif Aslam; 12 March 1983 (age 43); Wazirabad, Punjab, Pakistan
- Other name: Aadeez
- Education: University of Central Punjab
- Occupations: Singer; songwriter; composer; actor
- Works: Discography; filmography
- Spouse: Sara Bharwana (m. 2013)
- Children: 3
- Awards: Full list
- Honours: Tamgha-e-Imtiaz (2008); Dubai Walk of Fame (2019)
- Musical career
- Genres: Alternative music; classical music; filmi; qawwali; pop; rock; romantic
- Instruments: Vocals; guitar; piano
- Years active: 2002–present
- Labels: Zee Music Company; T-Series; Coke Studio; YRF Music; Universal Music; Venus Records; Sony Music
- Past members: Jal
- Website: aadeez.com

Signature
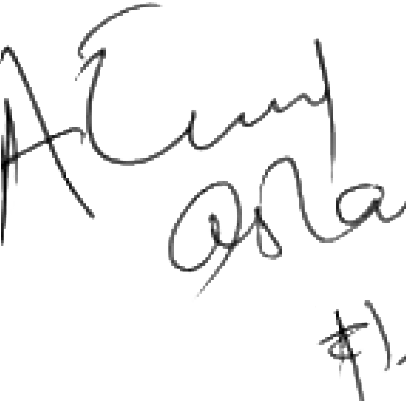

Atif Aslam (Note: Urdu, Punjabi: عاطف اسلم, Punjabi pronunciation: [ɑːt̪ɪf əsləm].) (Punjabi pronunciation: [ɑːt̪ɪf əsləm]; born 12 March 1983), also known mononymously by the hypocorism Aadeez, is a Pakistani playback singer, songwriter, composer, and actor. He has recorded many songs in both Pakistani films and Indian films, and is known for his vocal belting technique. His music style has been described as a mixture of Pakistani pop and Sufi rock. He made his Bollywood film debut in 2005 by singing his album song "Aadat" in Kalyug.

Born in Wazirabad, Punjab, Aslam began his music career in the early 2000s and rose to prominence following the release of "Aadat". He released his debut solo album, Jal Pari, in 2004 before establishing a successful playback career in Bollywood, recording songs including "Woh Lamhe Woh Baatein", "Pehli Nazar Mein", "Tu Jaane Na", "Tera Hone Laga Hoon", "Jeene Laga Hoon", and "Dil Diyan Gallan". He has also been a prominent performer on Coke Studio Pakistan, where his performances have included "Tajdar-e-Haram", "Man Aamadeh Am", and "Wohi Khuda Hai". Aslam primarily performs in Urdu and Punjabi, and has also recorded songs in Hindi, Bengali, Persian, and Pashto.

Aslam has received numerous honours during his career, including the Tamgha-e-Imtiaz from the Government of Pakistan in 2008 and several Lux Style Awards. He made his acting debut in the 2011 Urdu social drama film Bol. In 2019, he received a star on The Dubai Stars in Dubai, and in 2020 was included in Forbes Asia's 100 Digital Stars list.

== Early life and education ==
Atif Aslam was born on 12 March 1983, to a middle-class Punjabi family in Wazirabad, Punjab. He has three brothers, who have all worked with him: Shahzad as photographer, Shahbaz as designer and manager and Shiraaz as his website coordinator. He went to Kimberley Hall School in Lahore, Punjab, until 1991, when he moved to Rawalpindi, Punjab, and continued his studies at St. Paul's Cambridge School in Satellite Town. In 1995, Aslam returned to Lahore, where he continued his studies at a Divisional Public School and College (DPSC) branch. He proceeded to attend Fazaia Inter College for his HSSC from 1999 to 2001, and later went to University of Central Punjab.

In an interview, Atif Aslam revealed that his ambition at the time was to become a singer. He first competed on stage, and won, at the age of 15 before singing in various talent contests. He also wanted to be a cricketer, being a fast bowler, and was selected for the Pakistan under-19 team, but he didn't go ahead as his parents wanted him to become a engineer.

== Music career ==
=== 2002–2008 ===
In 2002, Atif Aslam co-founded the music band Jal with Goher Mumtaz. The band released their debut single "Aadat" in late 2003 while Aslam was still the lead vocalist, and it became an instant viral success. Shortly after, due to creative differences, Aslam parted ways with the band to pursue a solo career. He released 2004 his debut solo album, Jal Pari, which included his own solo version of "Aadat".

Aslam's second album Doorie was released in 2006.

His debut song in Bollywood is "Woh Lamhe" from Zeher movie in 2005. He also sang "Aadat – Juda Hoke Bhi" from Kalyug movie the same year and "Tere Bin" from Bas Ek Pal movie in 2006.

Aslam's third album Meri Kahani released in 2008 was nominated in 7th Lux Style Awards in the category "Best Album". Album's song "Hangami Halaat" nominated in 2009 in "MTV Music Awards" in the category "Best Rock Song".

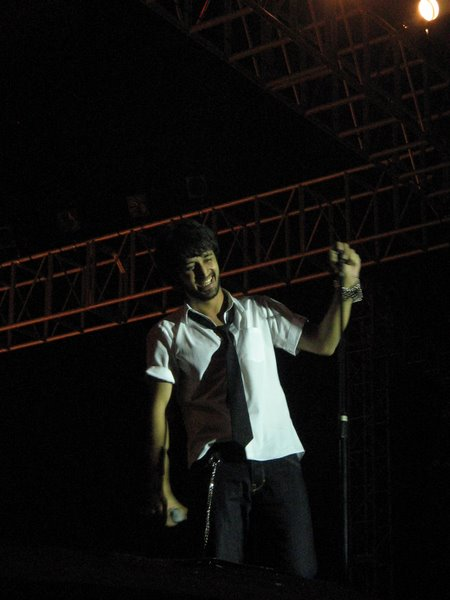
Aslam performing at Antaragni, IIT, Kanpur in 2008

In 2008, he recorded "Pehli Nazar Mein" and "Bakhuda Tumhi Ho" from Race and Kismat Konnection, respectively. "Pehli Nazar Mein" won him an IIFA Award.

Aslam made his solo debut concert in New Jersey in Summer Beats 2008 at Sovereign Bank Arena.

=== 2009–2015 ===
In the 2009 film Ajab Prem Ki Ghazab Kahani, he sang "Tu Jaane Na" and "Tera Hone Laga Hoon" including remix versions of both songs which fetched him several nominations.

In 2011, he sang a song from the film F.A.L.T.U, titled "Le Ja Tu Mujhe". The same year, he sang two duets, "Hona Tha Pyar" and "Kaho Aaj Bol Do", with Hadiqa Kiani for the Pakistani film Bol, in which he was also cast in the lead role. In this year, he recorded two songs, "Tu Muhabbat Hai" and "Piya O Re Piya", for the film Tere Naal Love Ho Gaya.

In 2012, he recorded two songs "Bol Ke Lab Azaad Hain" and "Mori Araj Suno" for the Hollywood film The Reluctant Fundamentalist.

He also performed in Coke Studio's Season Five titled "Charka Nolakha", "Rabba Sacheya" and "Dholna".

On 22 April 2012, Atif Aslam became the first Pakistani to perform in London's O2 Arena a concert spectacular to promote love, peace, and unity among Pakistan and India. Aslam performed for four hours. This was followed up by shows in Manchester and Glasgow.

In 2012, he was invited for three concerts at the World Trade Centre in Dubai. This was followed by his debut concert in Bangkok at the Centara Convention Centre on 6 October 2012.

On 2 November 2012, he performed his first public concert in Malaysia. In December 2012, Aslam was named among top performers of Dubai for 2012.

Aslam is the first artist from Asia, and the second artist after Bryan Adams, who was permitted to perform inside the Dashrath Rangasla National Football Stadium in Kathmandu, Nepal.

In April 2013, Aslam performed for the first time at the LG Arena in Birmingham following which he became the first artist from Asia to perform twice at London's O2 Arena. Also in concert at the O2 were Bollywood stars Shaan, Malaika Arora Khan & Bipasha Basu.

"Main Rang Sharbaton Ka" was nominated at World Music Awards in 2014 for "Best Song". "Main Rang Sharbaton Ka" fetched several awards and multiple nominations for him. "Zameen Jaagti Hai" and "Tu Khaas Hai" were released in Pakistan. In 2014, he recorded 2 songs for the film Entertainment, "Tera Naam Doon" and "Nahi Woh Saamne". Both songs were composed by Sachin–Jigar with lyrics written by Priya Panchal. He also sang QMobile Noir i10 advertising song "Dil Se Dil" and Etisalat advertising song "Faasle".

He worked with Sachin–Jigar for the song "Jeena Jeena" for the film Badlapur, The song "Jeena Jeena" topped various charts and was one of the biggest hits of 2015, which also got him a nomination for the Filmfare award for best playback singer. That same year he also recorded "Dil Kare" for Ho Mann Jahaan.

Aslam's rendition of "Tajdar-e-Haram" reached 540 million views on YouTube in July 2020, originally released in 2015, it became the first video to origin in Pakistan to achieve the record. The Qawwali song, originally sung by Sabri Brothers, was released on 15 August 2015 in CokeStudio Season 8 and has been viewed in 186 countries across the world. Also, it is Aslam's first individual video on YouTube to make the record.

=== 2016–2020 ===
Aslam worked with musician Arko Pravo for the song Tere Sang Yaara from Rustom (2016) which topped "Bollywood Life" chart, got nominated for "Filmfare Award for Best Male Playback Singer". Atif worked with Mithoon on four versions of the song "Mar Jaayen" from Loveshhuda in 2016, penned by Sayeed Qaudri.

"Dil Dancer" from the movie Actor in Law released, which earned him LUX Award for best playback singer. He sang "Yaariyaan" song with Ali Zafar, composed by Sahir Ali Bagga which released on 2016 Defence Day. He collaborated with Maher Zain for the song "I'm Alive" and sang "Jal Pari" for the advertisement of Huawei Honor 5X.

At the start of 2017, "Hoor" song from Hindi Medium was released. After which, the romantic song "Baarish" from Half Girlfriend composed by Tanishk Bagchi and the ballad song "Musafir" from Sweetie Weds NRI were released. Romantic song "Darasal" composed by JAM8 released the same year. Two Ballad songs "Main Agar" from Tubelight and "Jaane De" from Qarib Qarib Singlle, respectively, were out, composed by Pritam and Vishal Mishra respectively. In December 2017, "Dil Diyan Gallan" from Tiger Zinda Hai released, composed by Vishal–Shekhar and lyrics by Irshad Kamil. The song had garnered over 670M views on YouTube as of January 2021. His first Bengali song "Mithe Alo" from Cockpit film was also released.

The same year, "Pehli Dafa" starring Aslam and Ileana D'Cruz was released, which was a composition of Shiraz Uppal. A single "Younhi" written by Atif himself released on Atif's birthday, which featured Aslam and Nicolli Dela Nina. "Noor-e-Azal" Hamd released, sung by Aslam and Abida Parveen, a composition of Shani Arshad. He also sang ISPR song "Kabhi Percham Main", which was released on 2017 Defence Day.

He performed at 16th Lux Style Awards by singing "Pakistan National Anthem" and "Us Rah Par".

In 2018, a total of 19 songs were released by Aslam. "Dil Meri Na Sune" which was composed by Himesh Reshammiya for film Genius. "O Saathi" from Baaghi 2 written by Arko, "Paniyon Sa" from Satyameva Jayate. "Tere Liye" from Namaste England and "Tera Hua" from Loveyatri were major hits in the charts. He voiced for three recreated songs "Jab Koi Baat", "Dekhte Dekhte" for Batti Gul Meter Chalu which took the "official Asian music chart number 1" and recorded "Chalte Chalte" for Mitron. Other songs include "Sehmi Hai Dhadkan", three versions of "Selfish" for Race 3 and two songs "Tum" and "O Meri Laila" from Laila Majnu lyrics by Irshad Kamil.

"Thaam Lo from Parwaaz Hai Junoon" was also released during the same year, which earned him the LUX Award for the best playback Singer. He sang "Humain Pyaar Hai Pakistan Se", released on 2018 Defence Day. "12 Bajay" was released in December 2018.

In January 2019, the "Auliya" song from Hum Chaar was released, composed by Vipin Patwa. "Baarishein" released on 13 February 2019, a day before the 2019 Pulwama attack. He performed at 18th Lux Style Awards and sang "Mujhe Dil Se Na Bhulana" with Momina Mustehsan as a tribute to Bangladeshi-Pakistani actress Shabnam.

"In Dinon" and "Anjaana" from the Superstar film were also released. Pardadari, sung by Aslam and Abida Parveen also released.

Coke Studio started with songs of Aslam in Season 12. Aaye Kuch Abr, Mubarik Mubarik and Wohi Khuda Hai were released.

The song "Kinna Sona" became a topic of controversy as it was originally recorded by Aslam for the film Marjaavaan, but the track was replaced at the last minute by Indian singer Jubin Nautiyal. The song was a mix-and-match blended cover with heavy inspirations from Pakistani Sufi Islamic Qawwali music that was sung by NFAK. In June 2020, T-Series released the original cover sung by Aslam on YouTube, but was forced to remove it and immediately issued an apology after a threat-laced campaign led by various right-wing Indian nationalist figures and parties such as the Maharashtra Navnirman Sena.

Following heightened India–Pakistan tensions after the 2016 Uri attack, Pakistani artists faced restrictions on working in India, affecting Aslam’s Bollywood career. His Indian performances were cancelled and his existing songs were temporarily removed from some platforms. In 2025, his Instagram account was also reportedly blocked for Indian users. Aslam has since described the restrictions as a roughly decade long ban.

In 2020, Atif released "Woh Mere Bin". He also sang Zong advertisement song "Aik Naya Khaab".

In April 2020, he recited Azaan shortly after which Coke Studio released "Asma-ul-Husna" in May 2020, recited by Atif Aslam and produced by Zulfiqar Jabbar Khan as an expression of solidarity with humanity amid the COVID-19 pandemic. It features voices from the universe recorded by NASA, thirty three backing vocalist from across the globe and the sound of Daf with pronunciation supervised by Hafiz Idrees giving it the feat of having 4M views in four days on YouTube and as of December 2021, it has received over 50M views. Atif Aslam worked for an ad of Infinix Mobile Zero 8. "Kadi Te Hans" released on 20 November 2020 by Velo Sound Station which got 2.5M views in two days of its release.

After a solo debut concert in New Jersey in 2008, Aslam returned with his band and special guests to Queens Colden Center, New York for a performance on 2 July 2020. He continued to tour the world with headline performances at the Royal Albert Hall in London, alongside Jay Sean.

Aslam has also performed in Bangladesh and Kenya. Aslam performed alongside Sonu Nigam in three occasions, one of which is a concert Shaam-e-Dostana at the Putrajaya International Convention Centre in Malaysia.

=== 2021–2025 ===
On 26 February 2021, Atif released the song "Raat" which was a poem by Munir Niazi. A tribute to Musarrat Nazir "Chale To Kat Hi Jayega" premiered on 19 March 2021 and received 14 million views in 3 days. On 26 May 2021, Times Music released Atif's Unreleased song "Jee Len De" from the Movie Romeo Akbar Walter (RAW) starring 'John Abraham'. Atif released the song Rafta rafta on 21 July 2021. On 24 October 2021, Coke Studio released his new song "Cricket Khidaiye" with Faris Shafi and Talal Qureshi on the occasion of T-20 World Cup 2021.

On 25 January 2022, Atif Aslam along with Aima Baig performed PSL National Anthem, the song titled as "Agay Dekh".

On 27 October 2022, Atif Aslam's "Moonrise" was released, featuring Amy Jackson. In an interview at Capital Talk with Hamid Mir, Atif revealed an untitled Bengali song that would be released soon. Some unreleased songs of Atif Aslam that were replaced by other Bollywood artists includes "Chashni".

On 15 November 2024, Atif Aslam unveiled "Borderless World", a music programme to promote musical talent globally. Atif explained that Borderless World has been in the making for over a year. On 4 January 2025, Atif officially launched the first season of "Borderless World". Season 1 contains total of 6 songs in which 2 were recreation of his own old songs.

=== 2026–present ===
On 18 July 2026, Atif Aslam announced his fourth studio album, Subah Aye Na, through his official Instagram account. The announcement revealed the album's title, cover artwork and eight-song track listing. The album was released on 31 July 2026, marking Aslam's first studio album in 18 years since Meri Kahani (2008).

== Acting career ==
Aslam made his acting debut in the 2011 Pakistani movie Bol along with Pakistani actress Mahira Khan.

He made his television debut with the Pakistani series Sang-e-Mah, released in January 2022 on Hum TV. The series was an adaptation of Hamlet and Aslam played the role of Hilmand Khan (Hamlet). He won the Best Television Debut Male award at the 9th Hum Awards in Dubai for his performance.

== Personal life ==
Atif married educationist Sara Bharwana in Lahore on 29 March 2013. Together they have three children: two sons and one daughter.

== Filmography ==
=== Films ===
Year	Film	Role	Language	Notes
2011	Bol	Mustafa	Urdu	Film Debut

=== Television serials ===
Year	Series	Role	Notes
2021	Sang-e-Mah	Hilmand Khan	TV Debut

== Discography ==
=== Featuring music videos ===
Atif Aslam appeared in following music videos from Pakistani and Indian feature films.

Year	Song	Film	Refs
Pakistani films
2011	Kaho Aaj Bol Do	Bol	
2011	Hona Tha Pyar	Bol	
2015	Dil Kare	Ho Mann Jahaan	
2016	Dil Yeh Dancer Ho Gaya	Actor in Law	
Indian films
2006	Tere Bin	Bas Ek Pal	
2008	Pehli Nazar Mein	Race	
2010	Aa Bhi Ja Sanam (Dance Mix)	Prince	
2010	Kaun Hoon Main	Prince	
2012	Piya O Re Piya	Tere Naal Love Ho Gaya	
2012	Tu Mohabbat Hai (Remix Version)	Tere Naal Love Ho Gaya	
2013	Be Intehaan	Race 2	
2013	Dil Na Jaane Kyun	Jayantabhai Ki Luv Story	
2013	Aa Bhi Ja Mere Mehermaan	Jayantabhai Ki Luv Story	
2015	Jeena Jeena	Badlapur	
2016	Khair Mangda	A Flying Jatt	
2017	Hoor	Hindi Medium	
2017	Jaane De	Qarib Qarib Singlle	
2018	O Saathi	Baaghi 2	
Pakistani dramas
2022	Sang-e-Mah	Sang-e-Mah	
2024	Tumhari Chup	Gentleman	

== See also ==
- Jal (band)
- Music of Pakistan
- List of Pakistani pop singers
