= Ajab Prem Ki Ghazab Kahani =

2009 Indian film by Rajkumar Santoshi

- Theatrical release poster
- Directed by: Rajkumar Santoshi
- Written by: R. D. Tailang; Rajkumar Santoshi
- Story by: K. Rajeshwar; Rajkumar Santoshi
- Produced by: Ramesh S. Taurani
- Starring: Ranbir Kapoor; Katrina Kaif
- Cinematography: Tirru
- Edited by: Steven H. Bernard
- Music by: Songs: Pritam; Score: Salim–Sulaiman
- Production company: Tips Industries
- Distributed by: Tips Industries
- Release date: 6 November 2009
- Running time: 144 minutes
- Country: India
- Language: Hindi
- Budget: ₹44 crore
- Box office: ₹106.73 crore

Ajab Prem Ki Ghazab Kahani (transl. An Amazing Story of a Strange Love (Note: Prem is also the name of the film's protagonist.)) is a 2009 Indian Hindi-language romantic comedy film written and directed by Rajkumar Santoshi and produced by Ramesh Taurani under Tips Industries. The film stars Ranbir Kapoor and Katrina Kaif in the lead roles.

Released on 6 November 2009, the film was a critical and commercial success with a worldwide gross of ₹106.73 crore, becoming the third-highest grossing Hindi film of 2009 and is now considered a cult classic. Kapoor and Kaif's chemistry was highly praised in the film. It is an unofficial remake of 2005 Telugu film Soggadu.

At the 55th Filmfare Awards, Ajab Prem Ki Ghazab Kahani received 5 nominations, including Best Actor (Kapoor) and Best Music Director (Pritam), and won Best Actor (Critics) (Kapoor). The film was theatrically re-released on 25 October 2024.

== Plot ==
A reporter enters a small town that appears abandoned, and a statue speaks to him. The reporter asks the statue where the people of the town are, and the statue then narrates a story.

Prem Shankar Sharma is a freeloader who, while helping his friend elope, meets Jennifer "Jenny" Pinto. They both share the trait of stammering when they are emotional; in such a moment, the stammering Jenny induces a spontaneous stammer in Prem, but she misinterprets his stammer as a mockery on her. Although this makes her dislike Prem initially, she reconciles with him after realizing that his stammer is real. Prem eventually falls in love with Jenny, although she is oblivious to this and only considers him a friend. When he tries to tell Jenny his feelings, he finds out that Jenny is in love with her college friend Rahul Jalan.

He then meets Rahul and finds out that Rahul loves Jenny more than his family, so he helps them board a train to escape. However, Rahul disappears at the train station, and Jenny returns to Prem so Prem can help her find Rahul.

Rahul's father, Pitambar Jalan, a politician, does not like Jenny and completely opposes a relationship between Jenny and Rahul, mainly due to the religious barrier, Jenny being a Christian and Rahul a Hindu. When Prem visits Rahul's house for Jenny's proposal with Rahul, he is insulted by Pitambar. Prem convinces his mother Sharda to let Jenny hide in their house while Jenny's family searches for her, but they are eventually caught by the police. Jenny lies that she and Prem are in love to save Rahul's name. While Prem corroborates Jenny's lie, he gets emotional and spurts out his true feelings for Jenny, which she mistakes for over-acting.

Prem and Jenny successfully go to a club where Rahul's birthday party is being held so that Jenny and Rahul can be reunited and eventually convince Pitambar to support the relationship. Rahul then tells Prem that he and Jenny are going to prepare for the wedding in two days.

Unfortunately, a day before the wedding, Jenny gets kidnapped by a gangster named Sajid Don, who is seeking a ransom from Pitambar in exchange for her. Prem and his buddies find her in Sajid Don's warehouse. A hilarious fight ensues between Prem's and Sajid Don's gangs. Prem's father, Shiv Shankar Sharma, joins the fight and Sajid Don, a wanted criminal, gets arrested.

Rahul and a contesting Pitambar tell the media that it was they who were the ones involved in the fight with Sajid Don, intending to buy a good name for Pitambar before the elections. On Jenny and Rahul's wedding day, Jenny finds out that Prem actually gave consent to Rahul and Pitambar to publicize their false story. This and her past recollections of Prem's selfless caring for her make her realize that she truly loves Prem and that Rahul and his family are actually very selfish, prompting her to become a runaway bride. Meanwhile, Prem, who is about to leave the town, is stopped by an actor in the get-up of Jesus, who asks him to guide him to an address, further driving him back to the church, where he finds Jenny as the actor disappears and it is revealed that he was actually Jesus Christ, who took a human form to unite Prem with Jenny after hearing her prayers in the church. She is united with Prem, and the two happily get married in a small celebration at a marriage registration office.

The statue, in the beginning, reveals that the entire town is attending their wedding and asks the reporter to visit the registration office.

== Cast ==
- Ranbir Kapoor as "President" Prem Shankar Sharma
- Kapoor also plays the statue narrating the story
- Katrina Kaif as Jennifer "Jenny" Pinto, Prem's love interest and later wife
- Pradeep Kharab as Tony Braganza
- Zakir Hussain as Sajid Don
- Upen Patel as Rahul Jalan
- Darshan Jariwala as Shiv Shankar Sharma, Prem's father
- Mithilesh Chaturvedi as Albert Pinto, Jenny's adoptive father
- Navneet Nishan as Rosalina "Rosie" Pinto, Jenny's adoptive mother
- Smita Jaykar as Sharda Sharma, Prem's mother
- Prem's friends in The Happy Club
- Shyam Mashalkar as Raju
- Akul Tripathi as Kunnu
- Khurshed Lawyer as David Braganza
- Ameya Hunaswadkar as Lakhan
- Vishwanath Chatterjee as Chandan
- Salman Khan as himself in a coffee shop (cameo appearance)
- Sanatan Modi as Peter Braganza, Tony's father
- Govind Namdeo as Pitambar Jalan, Rahul's father
- Dolly Bindra as Vidya Jalan, Pitambar's wife and Rahul's mother
- Mohan Raman as Sheshadri, Pitambar's PA
- Abhay Bhargava as Terror Tej Singh
- Rana Jung Bahadur as Inspector Jung Bahadur Rana
- Rati Shankar Tripathi as Bhairon Singh
- Delhi Ganesh as a temple priest
- Behzaad Khan as Jesus Christ
- Rajkumar Santoshi as a passer-by
- Viju Khote as Robert

== Reception ==
=== Critical response ===
Ajab Prem Ki Ghazab Kahani received positive reviews from critics upon release. Subhash K. Jha states, "If you've ever wondered what on earth is on-screen chemistry here's your one-stop all-purpose encyclopedia on celluloid magic. Fasten your 'see'-it belts, as veteran filmmaker Rajkumar Santoshi sheds all his lajja, and pulls out all stops to do a wacky goofy edgeless weightless comedy of characters who walk in and walk out of frames leaving behind fumes of old-fashioned funnies. Ajab Prem Ki Ghazab Kahani is an airtight trapeze down that familiar romantic lane." Nikhat Kazmi of the Times of India gave it four stars out of five and states: "The newly formented Ranbir-Katrina chemistry sets the screen on fire in this Mad Hatter's tea party. Adding to this is Pritam's peppy music score with Neeraj Shridhar, Atif Aslam, Hard Kaur, Sunidhi Chauhan and Mika raising a toast to a high-spirited song and dance and Raj Kumar Santoshi penning some of the funniest dialogues in recent times and you have a great escape awaiting you at your favourite audi this weekend. Go, have a ball." Taran Adarsh of Bollywood Hungama gave the film four out of five stars arguing that it "entertains majorly" and that "the romantic moments are endearing. Most importantly, the on-screen chemistry is electrifying. Ranbir and Katrina look great together!" Noyon Jyoti Parasara of AOL India gave 3 out of 5 stars saying, "Its strong point, apart from Ranbir, happens to be its clichéd settings." Omar Qureshi of Zoom gave 3.5 out of five stars saying that "The main point to be noted in the film is that, the film is totally dedicated to loving and all the things that are related to love and so, it will leave an ever lasting impression on youth." Minty Tejpal of Mumbai Mirror gave 3.5 out of five stars, saying that "It seems that Ranbir Kapoor can do nothing wrong. He is just fantastic through the film." Mayank Shekhar of the Hindustan Times gave it one star and said that "The film has no comic bone at all. There is certainly no romance either." Rajeev Masand of CNN-IBN gave it 2.5 out of five stars and said that "Ajab Prem Ki Ghazab Kahani is a silly comedy that goes for slapstick gags and juvenile jokes that are hard to appreciate."

=== Box office ===
Ajab Prem Ki Ghazab Kahani collected a net India gross of ₹6.64 crores on its opening day, and ₹38 crore in its opening week. It was declared Semi-Hit at the box-office having collected a lifetime gross collection of ₹86.02 crore in India, including a nett income of ₹62.84 crore, and ₹13.71 crore from overseas box office, thus making a worldwide total of ₹99.73 crore. It was the third highest-grossing Bollywood film of 2009 behind 3 Idiots and Love Aaj Kal.

== Soundtrack ==
The soundtrack was composed by Pritam while lyrics were penned by Irshad Kamil and Ashish Pandit. The songs are remixed by DJ Suketu and arranged by Aks. Two songs from the film, "Tu Jaane Na" and "Tera Hone Laga Hoon," were sung by Pakistani singer Atif Aslam, which became widely popular.

Ajab Prem Ki Ghazab Kahani

Soundtrack album by Pritam
- Released: 2009
- Genre: Feature film soundtrack
- Length: 66:35 minutes
- Label: Tips Music Films
- Producer: Pritam

Pritam chronology
All the Best: Fun Begins (2009)	Ajab Prem Ki Ghazab Kahani (2009)	Tum Mile (2009)

=== Track listing ===
No.	Title	Artist(s)	Length
1.	"Main Tera Dhadkan Teri"	K.K, Sunidhi Chauhan & Hard Kaur	4:33
2.	"Tu Jaane Na"	Atif Aslam	5:41
3.	"Oh By God"	Sunidhi Chauhan & Mika Singh	4:58
4.	"Tera Hone Laga Hoon"	Atif Aslam, Alisha Chinai, Joi Barua & Parineeta Borthakur	4:56
5.	"Prem Ki Naiyya"	Neeraj Shridhar & Suzanne D'Mello	4:06
6.	"Aa Jao Meri Tamanna"	Javed Ali & Jojo	4:02
7.	"Follow Me"	Hard Kaur	2:52
8.	"Tu Jaane Na" (Reprise)	Soham, Rana Mazumdar & Ashish Pandit	5:43
9.	"Main Tera Dhadkan Teri" (Remix)	KK, Sunidhi Chauhan & Hard Kaur	5:04
10.	"Tu Jaane Na" (Remix)	Atif Aslam	6:06
11.	"Prem Ki Naiyya" (Remix)	Neeraj Shridhar & Suzanne D'Mello	4:31
12.	"Tera Hone Laga Hoon" (Remix)	Atif Aslam, Alisha Chinai & Joi Barua	4:46
13.	"Aa Jao Meri Tamanna" (Remix)	Javed Ali & Jojo	3:44
14.	"Tu Jaane Na" (Unplugged Version)	Kailash Kher, Paresh Kamath & Naresh	5:33
Total length:			1:06:35

=== Reception ===
The soundtrack received positive reviews from critics. Joginder Tuteja of Bollywood Hungama rated it 3.5/5 and praised the music composer saying, "This is Pritam's year, delivering chartbusters by dozens all through the year, he can now look forward to another bountiful of hit songs up his sleeves with Ajab Prem Ki Ghazab Kahani. Also, Kapoor and Kaif can enjoy a hugely popular track for themselves in the form of 'Main Tera Dhadkan Teri'. Go, pick this one up from the shelves!". Chandrima Pal of Rediff.com gave the film 3 out of 5, writing, "Ajab Prem Ki Ghazab Kahani works simply because of Tu Jaane Na and Kailash Kher. It is probably one of the most elegant and evocative songs of the season."

== Awards and nominations ==
Award	Category	Recipient(s) and nominee(s)	Result	Ref.
55th Filmfare Awards	Best Actor (Critics)	Ranbir Kapoor (also for Wake Up Sid and Rocket Singh: Salesman of the Year)	Won	
55th Filmfare Awards	Best Actor	Ranbir Kapoor	Nominated	
55th Filmfare Awards	Best Music Director	Pritam	Nominated	
55th Filmfare Awards	Best Male Playback Singer	Atif Aslam (for the song "Tu Jaane Na")	Nominated	
55th Filmfare Awards	Best Female Playback Singer	Alisha Chinai (for the song "Tera Hone Laga Hoon")	Nominated	
Screen Awards	Best Actor	Ranbir Kapoor	Nominated	
Screen Awards	Best Music Director	Pritam	Nominated	
Screen Awards	Best Choreography	Ahmed Khan (for the song "Prem Ki Naiyya")	Nominated	
Stardust Awards	Best Film of the Year – Comedy	Ajab Prem Ki Ghazab Kahani	Nominated	
Stardust Awards	Dream Director	Rajkumar Santoshi	Nominated	
Stardust Awards	Superstar of Tomorrow – Male	Ranbir Kapoor (also for Wake Up Sid)	Won	
Stardust Awards	Star of the Year – Female	Katrina Kaif (also for New York)	Won	
Producers Guild Film Awards	Best Supporting Actress	Smita Jaykar	Nominated	
Producers Guild Film Awards	Best Actor in a Comic Role	Darshan Jariwala	Nominated	
Producers Guild Film Awards	Best Music Director	Pritam	Nominated	
Producers Guild Film Awards	Best Dialogue	Rajkumar Santoshi	Nominated	
Producers Guild Film Awards	Best Art Direction	Nitish Roy	Nominated	
International Indian Film Academy Awards	Best Male Playback Singer	Atif Aslam (for the song "Tu Jaane Na")	Nominated	
2nd Mirchi Music Awards	Listeners' Choice Album of the Year	Ajab Prem Ki Ghazab Kahani	Won	
