= Kalyug (2005 film) =

2005 film by Mohit Suri

- Theatrical release poster
- Directed by: Mohit Suri
- Screenplay by: Anand Sivakumaran
- Dialogues by: Jay Dixit
- Story by: Mohit Suri
- Produced by: Mahesh Bhatt Mukesh Bhatt
- Starring: Kunal Khemu; Emraan Hashmi; Smilie Suri; Deepal Shaw; Amrita Singh; Ashutosh Rana
- Cinematography: Rituraj Narain
- Edited by: Akiv Ali
- Music by: Songs: Anu Malik; Faisal Rafi–Rohail Hyatt; Jal The Band; Amon Amarth; Soilwork; Background Score: Raju Singh
- Production company: Vishesh Films
- Distributed by: Nimbus Motion Pictures
- Release date: 9 December 2005
- Running time: 126 minutes
- Country: India
- Language: Hindi

Kalyug (transl. Modern era) is a 2005 Indian Hindi-language action thriller film written and directed by Mohit Suri and produced by Mukesh Bhatt. It stars Kunal Khemu, in his debut film as an adult actor, alongside Smilie Suri, Deepal Shaw, Emraan Hashmi, Amrita Singh, and Ashutosh Rana. The film follows a young man who sets out to exact revenge upon the porn industry after his wife commits suicide due to the footage of their first night getting released on the internet by some people in the hotel.

Kalyug was released on 9 December 2005.

== Plot ==
18 years ago, Pushkaran and his son, Kunal, were forced to leave Kashmir by terrorists. They relocate to Mumbai, where Kunal grows up. Kunal's father later dies in a train accident, and relatives from Jammu contact Kunal after the funeral, informing him that his father had promised to look after a young woman named Renuka. He agrees to fulfill his father's promise.

When Renuka arrives, she and Kunal fall in love and get married. They spend their honeymoon at a hotel, where they encounter Johnny, a womaniser. The newlyweds consummate their marriage and enjoy their honeymoon until a few nights later, when police storm in and arrest them. It is revealed that their intimate night was secretly recorded and uploaded onto a porn website. Kunal realizes that Johnny is responsible.

Renuka is forced by the police to sign papers and testify against her husband. Kunal tells her the truth and begs her not to sign the papers. The feelings of guilt, embarrassment, and confusion prove too much for Renuka, who jumps off the ledge and dies by suicide in front of Kunal. He is sent to prison because he refuses to admit to the false charge.

Eventually, he is able to prove himself innocent. Now free, he tracks down Johnny and discovers he is working for Simi Roy, a businesswoman who is secretly the porn website creator; she lives in Zürich, Switzerland. Kunal leaves for Zürich to take revenge against Johnny and Simi.

In Zürich, he meets Ali, a modern-day emo who runs an adult shop. In Ali's shop, he sees a magazine featuring an adult actress he'd seen on the website where his and Renuka's video was featured. Kunal and Ali track the girl down in a bar, where she works as a prostitute. When Kunal finds a woman being held hostage there, he beats up the bodyguards but gets hit by Simi Roy. The next day, he overhears Simi arguing with her abusive daughter, Tanya, about her sexual activities with her girlfriend. He asks Simi about the porn website, but she lies to him.

Kunal and Ali lure Johnny and his goons into a trap. During the fight, Ali is fatally stabbed by Johnny. Before dying, he manages to kill Johnny and his men, and reveals that Simi is indeed the mastermind; she also controls the red light district in Zürich.

Kunal asks Tanya for help; in return, he will help her ruin Simi's reputation. Simi is devastated when she sees her own daughter on her porn website, and it gets all over the news. In the ensuing confrontation, Tanya kills Simi before Simi can kill Kunal. Everyone involved with Simi is arrested. His revenge complete, Kunal starts a new life with the hostage he had saved, Annie.

== Cast ==
- Kunal Khemu as Kunal Dhar
- Smilie Suri as Renuka Ahuja
- Deepal Shaw as Anita “Annie” Varma
- Emraan Hashmi as Ali Bilal
- Ashutosh Rana as Farid Ahmed a.k.a. Johnny
- Amrita Singh as Simi Roy
- Atul Parchure as Bhaskar Rajput
- Farid Amiri as Vikram Garewal
- Sandeep Mehta as Advocate Ketan Shah
- Yatin Karyekar as Pushkaran Dhar, Kunal's father
- Sheena Bajaj as Hema Birla
- Amitabh Bhattacharjee as ACP Jadhav
- Prasad Oak as Vishal Verma, Annie's uncle

== Production ==
The film was initially titled 'Blue Film'; however, the title was later changed to 'Kali Yuga'.

== Music ==
Kalyug

Soundtrack album by Anu Malik
- Released: 29 October 2005
- Recorded: 2005
- Genre: Feature film soundtrack
- Length: 39:14
- Language: Hindi
- Label: Saregama
- Producers: Anu Malik, Rohail Hyatt, Jal, Mithoon

Anu Malik chronology
Deewane Huye Paagal (2005)	Kalyug (2005)	My Bollywood Bride (2006)

The soundtrack was released on 29 October 2005. Raju Singh composed the film score while the songs featured in the film were composed by Anu Malik, Faisal Rafi, Rohail Hyatt, Jal, Goher Mumtaz, and Mithoon. The track "Aadat" was reused from Jal's album of the same name, with music being recreated by Mithoon. According to the Indian trade website Box Office India, with around 1,400,000 units sold, this film's soundtrack album was the year's twelfth highest-selling.

=== Track listing ===
Original CD track listing
No.	Title	Lyrics	Music	Singer(s)	Length
1.	"Jiya Dhadak Dhadak Jaye"	Asim Raza	Rohail Hyatt, Faisal Rafi	Rahat Fateh Ali Khan	5:15
2.	"Aadat" (rearranged by Mithoon)	Goher Mumtaz, Sayeed Quadri	Goher Mumtaz	Atif Aslam	5:36
3.	"Dheere Dheere"	Sayeed Quadri	Anu Malik	Alisha Chinoy, Abrar-ul-Haq	6:12
4.	"Ye Pal (not in the film)"	Sayeed Quadri	Anu Malik	Najam Sheraz	6:26
5.	"Aadat (Remix)" (remixed by DJ Suketu)	Goher Mumtaz, Sayeed Quadri	Jal	Atif Aslam	4:10
6.	"Tujhe Dekh Dekh"	Asim Raza	Rohail Hyatt, Faisal Rafi	Rahat Fateh Ali Khan	2:42
7.	"Thi Meri Dastan"	Sayeed Quadri	Anu Malik	Anuradha Paudwal, Amit Sana	4:16
8.	"Aadat"	Goher Mumtaz	Goher Mumtaz	Jal	4:30
Total length:					39:14

== Reception ==
Film critic Taran Adarsh of Bollywood Hungama wrote that "On the whole, KALYUG is a well-made film that has a contemporary and modern feel to it".

== Home media ==
Kalyug's VCDs and DVDs were released by Shemaroo six weeks after the theatrical release.
