= 4th Lux Style Awards =

2005 Pakistani awards ceremony

- Date: 3 October 2005
- Site: Expo Centre, Karachi
- Hosted by: Shaan Shahid

Television coverage
- Channel: ARY Digital

The 4th Lux Style Awards ceremony was held in Expo Center in Karachi, Pakistan 3 October 2005. The show was hosted by Junaid Khan and Aamina Sheikh and from the members of Banana News Network. The show had the performances by Humayun Saeed, Zara Sheikh, Veena Malik, Ali Zafar, Meesha Shafi and Sadia Imam. Some of the film and music categories were removed from the award.

== Films ==
=== Best Film ===
Salakhain

== Television ==
Categories	Winners	Nominations
Best Television Play (PTV)	Hum Se Juda Na Hona	Pooray Chaand Ki Raat; Pani Pe Nam; Pataal; Mah-e-Neem Shab
Best Television Director (PTV)	Ayub Khawar-Pataal	??
Best Television Actor (PTV)	Humayun Saeed-Hum Se Juda Na Hona	Izhar Qazi-Pani Pe Nam; Usman Peerzada-Pataal; Sohail Asghar-Mah-e-Neem Shab; Arbaaz Khan-Sassi
Best Television Actress (PTV)	Sadia Imam-Hum Se Juda Na Hona	Naheed Shabbir-Bezubaan; Sara Loren-Mah-e-Neem Shab; Uzma Gillani-Pataal; Wajeeha Ali-Pooray Chand Ki Raat
Best Television Play (Satellite)	Ana-Geo TV	Moorat-ARY Digital; Jaisay Jante Nahi-ARY Digital; Rustam Aur Sohrab-Indus Vision; Wujood-e-Laraib-Indus Vision; Woh Tees Din-Geo TV
Best Television Director (Satellite)	Anjum Shahzad-Woh Tees Din	??
Best Television Actor (Satellite)	Faisal Qureshi-Main Aur Tum (ARY Digital)	Nadeem Baig-Jaise Jante Nahi (ARY Digital); Abid Ali-Moorat (ARY Digital); Firdous Jamal-Woh Tees Din (Geo TV); Sajid Hassan-Yad To Ayenge (Geo TV); Talat Hussain-Ana (Geo TV)
Best Television Actress (Satellite)	Reema Khan-Yad Toh Ayenge (Geo TV)	Maria Wasti-Moorat (ARY Digital); Saba Hameed-Woh Tees Din (Geo TV); Samina Peerzada-Ana (Geo TV); Atiqa Odho-Dhool (ARY Digital)

== Music ==
Categories	Winners	Nominations
Best Video Director	Asim Raza-Mahi Vay	Saqib Malik-Khamaj; Jami-Dhaani; Ahsan Rahim & Amina Khan-Rangeen; Jami-Chal Dil Meray
Best Album of the Year	Nachan Main Audhay Naal-Abrar Ul Haq	Aadat-Jal; Jal Pari-Atif Aslam; Sampooran-Mekaal Hasan Band; Mazi, Haal, Mustaqbil-Mizraab
Best Band of the Year	Mekaal Hasan Band	N/A

== Special ==
Chairperson's Lifetime Award

Shamim Ara
