= Aadat (disambiguation) =

Aadat (Urdu: عادت, lit. 'habit') is a Pakistani drama serial directed Adnan Wai Qureshi.

Aadat may also refer to:

- Aadat (album), a 2004 studio album by the Pakistani band Jal
- "Aadat" (song), 2003, by Atif Aslam and Jal, remade in 2004 by Farhan Saeed and Jal
