= Jal (band) =

Pakistani pop rock band

Background information
- Origin: Lahore, Punjab, Pakistan
- Genres: Alternative rock; pop rock; pop
- Years active: 2002–present
- Labels: Sadaf Stereo, Fire Records, Universal Music
- Members: Goher Mumtaz; Ali Khan; Amir Azhar; Salman Albert
- Past members: Atif Aslam; Farhan Saeed; Aamir 'Shazi' Sheraz; Omer Nadeem
- Website: jaltheband.net

Jal (Urdu: جل, transl. Water, stylized as JAL, Jal The Band) is a pop rock band from Lahore, Punjab, Pakistan. The band originally consisted of singer-songwriter and lead guitarist Goher Mumtaz and vocalist Atif Aslam, later joined by bass guitarist Omer Nadeem and Salman Albert on drums in 2003. Founded in 2002, the band first became popular playing in Lahore's underground music scene with the release of their song "Aadat".

The band initially achieved commercial success with the release of their music video "Aadat", directed by Umer Anwar, in 2003. After the success of the single, lead vocalist Atif Aslam parted ways with the band, due to differences with lead guitarist Goher Mumtaz, to pursue a career as a solo artist. This led to Mumtaz recruiting musicians Farhan Saeed on vocals and Aamir Tufail aka Shazi on bass guitar.

The band's new line-up followed with the release of their début studio album, Aadat, in 2004. The album was declared as the best selling album of 2004 on Geo TV by the record label Sadaf Stereo. Soon afterwards, the band recorded and released their second studio album, Boondh, in 2007, which topped several music charts in South Asia. The band went on to win the MTV Asia Award for Favorite Artist India in 2006.

In 2011, Farhan Saeed also left the band to pursue a solo career, with Goher Mumtaz taking over as the lead vocalist of the band. Jal came out with their third studio album Pyaas, which was released to the fans delight on 11 March 2013 in both Pakistan (by Hum Network, M Records) and India (Universal Music). The album Pyaas featured remixes by DJ AKS. But even after that, On 23 December 2013, Aamir Tufail aka Shazi officially left the band.

Jal performed songs from their album Pyaas, apart from their old hits, in London's O2 Arena in June 2013.

== History ==
=== Early years (1998–2001) ===
Goher Mumtaz and Atif Aslam met each other while the latter was studying at the Punjab College in Lahore, Punjab, Pakistan, in 1998.

=== Formation (2001–2003) ===
Soon afterwards, the band started to gain popularity in Lahore's underground music scene and gained a large following due to the success of their song "Aadat". The band then went on to release the music video for the song, directed by Umer Anwar, through Indus Music, ARY Digital, and The Musik, in December 2003. The video was soon rated as the fourth-best video of the year 2003 by ARY The Muzik, within days of its release.

However, by the end of December 2003, Atif parted ways with the band due to musical differences with lead guitarist, Goher Mumtaz, to pursue a career as a solo artist. This led Goher to recruit musicians, Farhan Saeed on vocals and Aamir Tufail on bass guitar. Farhan was suggested by Sultan Raja, bassist of Call, who introduced him to Goher and thus joining the band as its vocalist. By this time the band, with a new line-up, re-did the song "Aadat" as its video was already being aired on local music channels with the former lead vocalist, Atif Aslam's, voice.

=== Revival (2004–2006) ===
Lamhay
Lamhay, Jal's single from their debut studio album, Aadat.

Following the release of the band's first single, Jal soon entered the recording studios to work on their début studio album release. The band had recruited bassist Aamir Tufail along with vocalist Farhan Saeed, and started to work on their first album. The album was composed by Goher and was produced by Zulfiqar Jabbar Khan and Mekaal Hasan, who previously produced the band's début single "Aadat", which was a major hit in both India and Pakistan. Jal then went on recording and releasing their début studio album, Aadat, through the record label Sadaf Stereo, on 27 September 2004. Mostly all singles from the album did really well at the local music charts, most notably "Aadat" which topped the charts and stayed at the top for two weeks. Whereas, five other songs from the album received Top 40 airplay on radio and music channels in Pakistan. Sales of the album were such that it remained at the top of the Pakistani music charts for several weeks after its release. The album was declared as the best selling album of 2004 on Geo TV by the record label Sadaf Stereo. This was followed by the album being released in India by HOM Records. In October, Jal released their second single "Lamhay" music video, from their album, directed by Zulfiqar Jabbar Khan. On 11 November, Jal went on performing at Lahore Grammar School 55-Main branch along with Call. In December, Jal received a special award by Shaukat Khanum Cancer Hospital in recognition of their support and efforts to raise funds for fighting cancer in Pakistan.

Atif Aslam, released his debut solo album Jal Pari, after he left the band, which included few songs from Jal's first studio album. This led to a dispute between Atif and Jal about who owned the rights to the songs as Goher took the dispute to court. However, the final statement from the court went in favour of both the artists as the songs which were included in both the artist albums were compositions of both Atif and Goher. Thus, the dispute ended between the two musicians.

On 2 February 2005, Jal performed a charity concert for the Indian Ocean earthquake and tsunami victims at Alhamra Auditorium in Lahore. In the same year, the title track "Aadat", from their debut album, was remade for the Bollywood movie Kalyug, directed by Mohit Suri and produced by Mahesh Bhatt. Also, Jal band members established themselves as a popular and commercially successful band in Pakistan, as their début album continued to top the music charts locally, and the release of their single "Lamhay" turned out to be another successful single by the band in 2004, and even a year after its release. The song created controversy as a remix version of the song later appeared in the Bollywood movie Zeher, released in March 2005. Jal accused the film producers of stealing their song, "Lamhay". In response to this accusation, the music director for the movie, Anu Malik, credited himself for only "re-creating" the song on the album, but there was still a heavily noticeable resemblance. Roop Kumar Rathod is credited as the "composer" for the song, while the original composer of the song is vocalist, lead guitarist, Goher Mumtaz, of the band. However, Atif Aslam, who sang the song for the movie, faced legal problems over the band name "Jal" with the existing members.

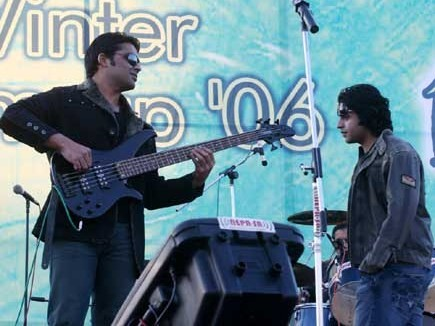
Jal performing live at Tundikhel, Kathmandu, Nepal, on 15 December 2006: bassist Aamir Tufail (left) and singer Farhan Saeed.

On 30 April, due to the success of their debut studio album, Jal won four awards and received two nominations at the Indus Music Awards. The band won the "Best Lyrics", "Best Composition" and "Best Song" awards, for their song "Aadat", along with the "Best Band" award at the music awards. Also, the band were nominated for the "Best Music Album", for their debut album and also the "Best Composition", for the song "Lamhay", award. On 24 September, Jal received a nomination for the "Best Song" and "Best Lyrics" award for their song "Lamhay" and also received an award for the "Best Pop Group", for their debut album Aadat, at the Sahara Sangeet Awards, held at Oakland Arena in Oakland, California, United States.

Jal has been invited by the colleges of Pakistan and India as well to perform in the fests. In November 2009 they were received at IIT Roorkee with a crowd of students from across India. Similar concerts across various top colleges keep taking place. For a list of Jal's upcoming concerts one can refer to their.

In 2006, Jal's music video for the song "Ik Din Aayega" was declared as the second best video among the top 100 videos selected by ARY Musik channel. On 31 March 2006, Jal once again went on performing at Alhamra Auditorium in Lahore. The following day, the band went on performing at Nawabshah District, for the first time. Soon afterwards, the band then went on performing across border in neighbouring country, India, at Modern School, New Delhi on 7 April. On 6 May, Jal won the MTV Asia Award for Favorite Artist India at MTV Asia Awards 2006 held at the Siam Paragon in Bangkok, Thailand. The band also performed their song "Aadat" live at the music awards.

After a month, on 10 June, Jal went on performing live at Defence Club and Arts Council Karachi, in Karachi. Followed by performing live in the capital city of the state Andhra Pradesh, in Hyderabad, India. On 15 December, Jal performed live in front of a crowd of 15, 000 audiences at Tundikhel for the first time in Kathmandu, Nepal. The band opened their act by performing "Teri Yaad", followed by the massive hit "Lamhay" and also performing many cover songs like "Lal Meri Pat". On 23 December, Jal released a video album Woh Lamhay, which included music videos released by the band and remixes of the songs "Aadat" and "Lamhay" by Dr. Zeus, through the record label HOM Records.

=== Success (2007–2009) ===
In 2007, Jal struck a deal with Gibson Guitar Corporation, becoming the first South Asian band in history (along with the Pakistani pop rock band Strings) to create a working relationship with the famed guitar manufacturers. It was reported that according to the deal, Jal will exclusively use Gibson guitars during concerts, studio recordings and music videos. Furthermore, Jal will act as brand ambassadors to Gibson. In return, Gibson will sponsor the varied endeavours of the band and also provide concert halls and equipment as and when required. Following this, Jal also became the brand ambassadors for the Abu Dhabi based mobile telecommunication company, Warid Telecom. In the same year, Jal entered the recording studios to work on their second studio album release. The mixing and engineering of the album was done by Mekaal Hasan and Goher Mumtaz. The album was recorded at Digital Fidelity Studios in Lahore, where the band also recorded their debut album Aadat in 2004. All songs on the album were composed and written by Goher Mumtaz with the exception of one track, which is written by Farhan Saeed and the album was produced by Mekaal Hasan. On 14 December, Jal went on releasing their second studio album Boondh, through the record label Fire Records, sponsored by Warid Telecom. Farhan Saeed, the lead vocalist of the band, explained "the title of the album Boondh is not the name of any song in the album, but is basically the theme of the album and covers all the songs in it. The name suggests that we as a band are just like a small droplet of water in the sea of music, which covers Pakistan, Asia and the entire world where our music is heard. It is our small contribution to the sea of music," said Farhan. This was followed by a live tour, mainly in South Asia, with concerts all over Pakistan, and a few places in India. The following day, Jal released their first music video of the single "Sajni" from their second album, featuring Juggan Kazim, directed by Bilal Lashari. The single was a major hit all over Pakistan, topping all of the charts in the country, just after a month of its release.

In 2008, Jal were signed to Unilever as they became the brand ambassadors for Wall's ice cream. On 19 February, Jal released the video of their new single "Chaltay Chaltay" featuring Bollywood actress Amrita Rao. The single later appeared as a bonus track on the band's second album, when re-released on 26 February in Pakistan and 26 March, internationally. Jal's second album Boondh became an instantaneous hit, winning the Lux Style Award for "Album of the Year". The song "Sajni" from this album also won the Best Song and Video of the Year awards at the same ceremony. On 14 June, Jal won the "Best Song" award for the song "Chaltay Chaltay" at The Musik Awards. This was followed by Jal travelling to Toronto, Canada, performing at Markham Fair Grounds in South Asian Mela, on 15 June. Then going to performing live at Corianthas in Pune, India. On 13 July, the band once again travelled to Canada this time performing at the Wonder Land in Toronto. Followed by a number of concerts in Pakistan and India and then travelling to perform at Rådhusplassen in Oslo, Norway, on 24 August. Jal's video "Sajni", directed by Bilal Lashari, went on winning the 'Best Pop Video Award' at MTV Video Awards 2008.

On 9 April 2009, Jal went on performing at Qurum City Amphitheatre in Muscat, Oman, for the first time. In May, Jal won the 'Best Ballad' award for their single "Moré Piya" and were nominated for the 'Best Band' award at the first MTV Pakistan Video Awards.

=== 2010–2011 ===
On 11 May, it was confirmed that Jal will be performing at Coke Studio season four first episode, which will be aired on 22 May, through a Coke Studio television promo of the first episode. On 14 May, in a behind the scenes video of Jal performing at a Coke Studio session, Goher Mumtaz discussed about performing a new song, "Ik Aarzu", at Coke Studio as it would be more challenging for the band. On 22 May, Coke Studio fourth season first episode aired in which Jal performed "Ik Aarzu", added with classical sufi poetry of Bulleh Shah infusion into the band's song lyrics, featuring with backing vocals by Zoe Viccaji and Rachel Viccaji. On 24 May, in a review of the Coke Studio fourth season, first episode, The Express Tribune newspaper gave Jal's performance for the song "Ik Aarzu" a 7/10 rating. On 19 June, the third episode of Coke Studio fourth season aired saw the band sing their hit song "Panchi", from Aadat, with singer QB, who came in with her rendition of the Mohammad Ali Sheikhi and Allan Fakir's hit song "Tere Ishq Mae Jo Bhi Doob Gaya". The Express Tribune newspaper also gave this performance by the band a 7/10 rating.

On 22 August, the band's lead vocalist Farhan Saeed released a solo single cover of "Halka Halka Suroor" paying tribute to late Nusrat Fateh Ali Khan. The release of the song led to spreading rumours that the vocalist has parted ways with Jal. On 3 September, Saeed in an interview to The Express Tribune finally confirmed these speculations, disclosing his departure from the band to pursue a solo career. Saeed claimed that he disclosed his decision to Mumtaz and Aamir around the first week of Ramazan, saying "I invited them over to my café and explained my reasons for leaving the band. Goher offered that I could pursue my solo career while being a part of the band, but for me it's always been black or white as Jal would be my priority if I stay with the band."

Jal performed in front of an audience of 2000. They sang sajni pass bulao na "'& 'Aadat'' Mellifluously according to 74.5% audience.

=== Change (2012–2013) ===
Jal third studio album, Pyaas released in 2013.

On 8 Sep 2012, lead vocalist and lead guitarist, Goher Mumtaz in an interview with Rj Syed Ali confirmed that the band's third album, Pyaas, which was originally slated for a March 2012 release date, was delayed to be released on end of the year. Gohar, inspired from success of Fawad Khan; former member of band EP, took up acting as a side project in a Pakistani serial. Unlike Fawad, critics found his acting weaker and hence, he failed miserably. JAL released their 3rd Album "Pyaas" on 11 March 2013.

On 13 February, JAL released the video of their song Tanhai which became the OST of Drama Serial Tanhai for HumTV. On 9 April 2013, JAL released the video of their song "Dil Haari" Song from their 3rd Album Pyaas. on 16 June, JAL performed at O2 London. JAL is the First Pakistani Band to perform at O2, the most prestigious venue of world. On 1 September 2013, JAL released their 3rd Video Song "Pyaas" from their 3rd Album Pyaas.

=== Disintegration (2014) ===
On 23 December 2013, Aamir Tufail aka Shazi officially left the band.

=== 2014–2016 ===
On 6 January 2014, JAL released the video of their song Lao Guitar from their 3rd Album Pyaas, which as expected by its title, also failed to make an impression. While the shooting of Lao Guitar Video, Goher Mumtaz had an accident. In May 2014, JAL Performed for Ary Musik series The Floor. JAL performed Laiyan Laiyan & Panchi, Dil Haari, Aadat & Tanhai, Ik Aarzu, Woh Lamhay, Dil Haaray Pukaray, Udd Jaana in The Floor Live Sessions for ARY Musik.

On 17 January 2015, JAL released the video song "Tu Qadam Barhaye Ja" for Pakistan Armed Forces.

On 21 April 2015, JAL released their music video song "Tere Baajon". The song top all the music charts in few days after it released. On 6 September 2015, JAL released the video song "Ooncha" for The official PAF 50th Anniversary of 1965 war. On 7 November 2015, JAL released Khel Sajna for Drama Serial Neelam Kinaray For Hum Sitaray. The new Single Khel sejna became #1 on taazi charts in just 10 days. On 14 November 2015, JAL released the music video of Their First ever Medley from all 3 albums (Signature Mix) which includes these songs Chup Chup, Kash Yeh Pal, Woh Lamhay, Mahiya. On 6 November 2016, JAL released the video of their song Tu Muskura from their 3rd Album Pyaas.

=== 2017–present ===
In 2017, Jal released the single "Parinda." It garnered attention for its poetic lyrics and melodious composition. The song was supported by a visually captivating music video that premiered on 5 May 2017. This release marked Jal's attempt to reconnect with their fanbase after a brief hiatus, showcasing their ability to maintain their signature sound while introducing contemporary production techniques

In 2019, Goher Mumtaz made am appearance on Season 5 of Nescafé Basement, where he performed a reimagined rendition of Aadat alongside the studio band. The performance was widely acclaimed for its fresh take on the classic, blending modern arrangements with the timeless essence of the original track. During this performance, Goher also sang a few verses from the then unrelease song Bhanwaray, incorporating its lyrics into the Aadat medley. The cultural significance of this performance extended beyond traditional media. In an era dominated by short-form content, the rubab riff (performed by Wajahat Shah) from the performance became a viral trend on Instagram and TikTok, among South Asian creators. Users across the globe used these riffs as a backdrop to showcase nostalgic moments, personal journeys, and creative storytelling.

In 2020, Jal revealed the title of their 2 upcoming songs, "Bhanwaray" and "Pal". Among them Bhanwaray premiered 14 Feb 2020 (Valentine's Day) on YouTube as their first release of this decade 2020 featuring Sabeeka Imam.

In 2022, Jal released "Rooh-e-Jal," a soul mix mashup. This medley was a nostalgic journey for long-time fans and served as a testament to the band's musical evolution. The release received widespread acclaim for seamless integration of old and new elements in their work.

The following year, in 2023, they released a live version of "Parinda" and a new track titled "Beh Gaya," both from their upcoming album "Baarish."

In August 2024, Jal celebrated the 20th anniversary of Aadat by releasing a remastered version of the album across platforms like Spotify, YouTube Music, and Apple Music. The album included an 11th bonus track, "Sun Sarkaar," with its official video featuring Goher Mumtaz and Anam Goher, released on YouTube on 30 August 2024.

In September 2024, Jal returned to Dhaka, Bangladesh, after 12 years to headline the "Legends of the Decade" concert at Jamuna Future Park. The event faced challenges due to venue changes and crowd management issues but concluded with a memorable performance by the band.

As of January 2025, Jal announced plans to release their fourth studio album, "Baarish," later in the year. The plans have been in work since 2023.

== Discography ==
=== Albums ===
Year	Title	Label
2004	Aadat	Sadaf Stereo, HOM Records
2007	Boondh	Fire Records, Tips
2013	Pyaas	Universal Music, M Records
2026	Baarish	Expected

=== Singles ===
Year	Title	Detail(s)
2008	Sajni (Reprise)	Lux Style Awards
2010	Uraan	World Cup Song
2011	Dam Hai Toh Samnay	International Boxing Championship
2012	Ik Aarzu – Unplugged	Single (not included in Album Pyaas)
2015	Tu Qadam Berhaye Ja	Pakistan Armed Forces
2015	Tere Baajon	Single
2015	Ooncha	Pakistan Defence Day Song
2015	3 Albums Medley	JAL's 1st Official Medley (Songs: Chup Chup, Kash Yeh Pal, Woh Lamhay, Mahia)
2017	Parinda	Single
2018	Pakistan Hai Wo	Pakistan Independence Day Song
2020	Bhanwaray	Single
2020	Bhanwaray (Rendition)	Bhanwaray (Rendition) ft. DJ Santronix
2022	Rooh-e-Jal	Soul Mix Mashup
2023	Parinda - Live Version	From upcoming album Baarish
2023	Beh Gaya	From upcoming album Baarish
2024	Sun Sarkar	From album Aadat (Remastered)

=== Coke Studio Pakistan ===
Year	Title	Co-singer
2011	Ik Aarzu	
2011	Panchi (Reprise)	Qurat-ul-Ain Balouch

=== Pakistani Drama Soundtrack ===
Year	Song	Drama Serial
2014	Laiyan Laiyan (Cover)	Uff Yeh Muhabbat
2014	Dil Jhoomay	Uff Yeh Muhabbat
2014	Pyar Hai	Uff Yeh Muhabbat
2014	Rona Nahi	Uff Yeh Muhabbat
2015	Khel Sajna	Neelum Kinaray
2019	Mere Humdam OST	Mere Humdam

=== Music Videos ===
Title	Album	Detail(s)
Aadat	Aadat	Official music video with Atif Aslam
Lamhay	Aadat	
Dil Haray Pukaray	Aadat	
Ik Din Ayega	Aadat	
Teri Yaad	Aadat	
Bikhra Hoon Mein	Aadat	
Panchi	Aadat	
Sajni	Boondh	
Chaltay Chaltay	Boondh	
Mein Mast Hoon	Boondh	
Moray Piya	Boondh	
Yeh Tera Pakistan	Boondh	2009 World Twenty20 official video
Hamein Itna Pyar	Boondh	
Ik Aarzu	Coke Studio Pakistan (Season 4)	
Panchi - Reprised	Coke Studio Pakistan (Season 4)	
Uraan	Single	WorldCup Official Video
Dam Hai Tou Samnay	Single	International Boxing Championship
Mahia	Boondh	
Dil Haari	Pyaas	
Tanhai	Pyaas	Music Video (Tanhai Serial For HUM TV)
Pyaas	Pyaas	
Tou Lao Guitar	Pyaas	
Tu Qadam Barhaye Ja	Single	Pakistan Armed Forces
Tere Baajon	Single	
Ooncha	Single	Pakistan Defence Day Song
JAL's 3 Albums Medley	Single	JAL's 1st Official Medley (Songs: Chup Chup, Kash Yeh Pal, Woh Lamhay, Mahia)
Laiyan Laiyan	Cover	
Tu Muskura	Pyaas	
Parinda	Single	
Aadat feat. Bhanwaray & Har Jagah Hai Jal	Nescafé Basement Season 5	
Bhanwaray	Single	Produced by Daniel John's Records & GM Productions
Parinda - Live Version	Baarish	
Beh Gaya	Baarish	
Sun Sarkaar	Aadat (Remastered)	

=== Former Members Studio Album (Atif Aslam & Farhan Saeed) ===
Atif Aslam

- Jal Pari (2003)
- Doorie (2006)
- Meri Kahani (2008)

Farhan Saeed

- Khat (2025)

== Band members ==
Current members

- Goher Mumtaz – Vocals, Lead Guitar (2002–present)
- Ali Khan – Lead guitar (2017–present)
- Humza Mughal – Bass guitar (2023–present)
- Mubeen – Drums (2023–present)

Former members

- Atif Aslam – Vocals, backing vocals (2002–2003)
- Farhan Saeed – Vocals, backing vocals (2003–2011)
- Aamir Tufail aka Shazi – Bass guitar (2003–2013)
- Omer Nadeem – Bass guitar (2003–2003)

== Awards and nominations ==
Year	Category	Song/Nomination	Result
Indus Music Awards
2005	Best Lyrics	Aadat combined awards with Atif Aslam	Won
2005	Best Song	Aadat combined awards with Atif Aslam	Won
2005	Best Composition	Aadat combined awards with Atif Aslam	Won
2006	Best Rock Band		Won
MTV Asia Awards
2006	Favorite Artist India		Won
2009	Best Ballad Song	Moray Piya	Won
Lux Style Awards
2005	Best Album	Aadat	Nominated
2008	Best Album	Boondh	Won
2008	Best Song	Sajni	Won
2008	Best Video Director	Sajni – Bilal Lashari	Won
2014	Best Music Album	Pyaas	Nominated
The Musik Awards
2008	Best Song	Chalte Chalte	Won
PTV Awards
2010	Best Video	Sajni – Bilal Lashari	Won
Hum Awards
2014	Best Music Album	Pyaas	Nominated
2016	Best Music Single	Tere Baajon	Won

== See also ==
- List of Pakistani music bands
