= Juggun Kazim =

Pakistani TV Host

Juggun Kazim PP
- Born: Syeda Mehrbano Kazim; 7 January 1980 (age 46); Lahore, Punjab, Pakistan
- Occupations: Model, Film actress, TV actress, TV anchor
- Spouses: Ahmed Tajik (m. 2004; div. 2005) Faisal Naqvi (m. 2013)
- Children: 3
- Parent(s): Syed Abbas Kazim and Ghazala Saigol
- Relatives: Raza Kazim (uncle); Nasim Zehra (aunt)
- Modeling information
- Height: 5 ft 3 in (160 cm)
- Agency: Newton Landry Management (Canada)

Syeda Mehrbano Kazim (Urdu: سیدہ مہر بانو کاظم), known by the stage name Juggun Kazim (Urdu: جگن کاظم) or Juggan Kazim, is a Pakistani Canadian actress, television host, and YouTube personality. She has worked in numerous Pakistani and Canadian films. She is the brand ambassador for Garnier Fructis Pakistan.

Juggun Kazim was awarded the Tamgha-e-Imtiaz by the Government of Pakistan for her contributions to the media industry at the Presidential Awards ceremony on 23 March 2024.

== Personal life ==
Juggun Kazim was born in Lahore, Punjab, Pakistan, to a Kashmiri Punjabi Muslim family. She has an older sister and a younger brother. Her uncle, Raza Kazim, was a lawyer and supporter of the arts. Journalist Nasim Zehra is her aunt.

Her parents separated when she was a year old. Her father, Syed Abbas Kazim, let her work as a child model because "he looked upon it as something cute, "she says, even though her family considered acting—her ambition from an early age—to be too lowly a field for a girl of her stature. Her father was conservative in his ideas about women, and her mother, Ghazala Saigol, was more modern.

She attended Kinnaird College and King's College, Canada, where she received a Bachelor of Arts degree in Media. She also holds a Cisco Certified Network Associate certification.

In December 2004, Kazim returned to Pakistan from Canada and married Ahmed Tajik, who she had met at a friend's wedding. After just over a year of marriage, during which Ahmed beat her, she left him, taking their two-month-old son, Hamza, with her. The father is not involved in her son's upbringing; she says this was a mutual decision, influenced by her experiences as the child of divorced parents. She married Faisal H. Naqvi, with whom she has another son, Hassan, born on 27 June 2013 and a daughter, Noor Bano, born on 9 October 2020.

Juggun Kazim is fluent in Urdu, English, and Punjabi.

== Career ==
Kazim has been involved in media work since she was four years old. In 1985–86, she appeared in commercials for Samsonite and others.

She appeared in her first commercial play when she was fourteen, directed by her best friend, Mashal Peerzada. Her professional career, where she started using the name "Juggun Kazim", began in Toronto, when Sutherland Models approached her to work as a model. Kazim made her feature film debut in the lead role of "Gugan" in Gaurav Seth's film Pink Ludoos, opposite Shaheen Khan (known for Bend It Like Beckham). Since then, she has appeared in an episode of David Wellington's The Eleventh Hour, directed by T.W. Peacock. Kazim hosted her own television show at age 16 until she left Pakistan to pursue her passion for acting in North America. She has also appeared in numerous stage productions in her home town as well as in Toronto. Most recently, she played the lead and title roles in "Tara" produced by Rasik Arts under the direction of Sally Jones. She mainly does print modeling; her 5-foot-2-inch (1.57 m) stature makes her think that "I'd look rather stupid walking the ramp." After two music videos with Sutherland, she was approached by Newton Landry Management, who remain her Canadian agents.

After returning to Pakistan, she started hosting television with the show Beanbag, which she also conceived and wrote. Since then, she has hosted a number of shows for various Pakistani networks. In December 2007, Kazim appeared in the music video of "Sajni" alongside the members of the pop-rock band Jal. In March 2010, Kazim was named as L'Oréal's "Brand Ambassador" for their Garnier brand of hair and skin-care products in Pakistan.

In 2010, Juggun Kazim won Best Supporting Actress Award for Meri Unsuni Kahani on Pakistan Media Award.

In March 2011, Kazim acted opposite Shaan Shahid in Altaf Hussain's Lollywood film Khamosh Raho. As of 6 March 2011, Hussain planned to release the film in Pakistan on 10 June 2011. She is also starring opposite Mohib Mirza, Sanam Baloch and Sunita Marshall in Mirza's upcoming film Silent Cinema. Since 2011, she is the host of the show "Morning with Juggun" which airs on Pakistan Television Corporation's (PTV Home) on weekdays. This show is going well as the selection of guests is excellent. Full utilization of guest talent is only possible when they are allowed to speak out, but unfortunately they are interrupted by the host on a continual basis.

In 2022, she made her acting comeback with Hum TV's Agar and was paired with Junaid Khan. Juggun Kazim has also done Ramazan Transmission in 2021 with Qasim Ali Shah at A Plus TV.

== Filmography ==
Year	Movie	Role
2011	Khamosh Raho	Jay Kazim
2018	Altered Skin	Insiya
2022	Shotcut	TBA

=== Music videos ===
Year	Track Title	Album	Music Artist	Director
2007	"Sajni"	Boondh	Jal	Bilal Lashari

=== Television ===
Year	Title	Role	Notes
	Piyasi		
	Sher Dil		
	Chaat		
	Aik Pal		
	Meri Un Suni Kahaani		
2006	Sitam		
2007	Man-o-Salwa	Sheena	
2008	Naa Jane Kyun		
2009	Saiqa	Saiqa	
2009	Mishaal	Dua	
2009	Kagaz Ki Nao		
2010	Vasl	Marina	
2010	Mujhe Hai Hukum-e-Azaan		
2010	Patli Gali		
2010	Rangeel Pur		
	Kya Meri Shadi Sharukh Se Hogi		
2011	Omer Dadi Aur Gharwale		
2011	Pani Jaisa Piyar	Sasha	
2013	Kaash Aisa Ho		
2013	Mera Raqeeb	Raana	
2014	Uff Yeh Mohabbat	Ghazal	
2014	Zindagi Tum Ho		
2014	Janam Jali	Shaista	
2022–23	Agar	Ainne	
2023	Gunah	Gul Noor	
2023	Hadsa	Ammara	
2025	My Dear Cinderella	Batu Bilqis	

=== TV Host of programs ===
- Beanbag (Business Plus)
- CEO (Business Plus)
- Aaj Entertainment Tonight (Aaj TV)
- Fashion Stop (Ary Digital)
- Sunday Brunch (Aaj TV)
- Morning with Hum-Weekend Edition (Hum TV)
- Aik Din Juggun Kay Saath (Vibe TV)
- Honestly Speaking with Juggun Kazim (PTV)
- The Final Verdict with Juggun Kazim (Filmax)
- VIPs only (Aag TV)
- Mast Mornings (Dawn News)
- Yeh Subh Tumhari Hai (Express News)
- Morning with Juggun (PTV home)

== See also ==
- List of Pakistani actresses
