= Anam Goher =

Pakistani television actress

- Born: Anum Ahmad; 22 June 1989 (age 37)
- Other names: Anum Mumtaz; Anum Malik
- Occupations: Model; actress
- Years active: 2014–present
- Spouse: Goher Mumtaz (m. 2016)

Anam Goher (Urdu: انعم گوہر) is a Pakistani television actress. She made her acting debut along with her off screen husband Goher Mumtaz in Kathputli (2016).

== Personal life ==
Anam Goher and Gohar Mumtaz married in 2016. In 2022, they welcomed a son, Suleiman, who apparently has the same birthday as his mother.

== Career ==
Goher is known for her roles in many serials including Yeh Ishq (2016), Yeh Raha Dil (2017), Aakhri Station (2018) and Khaas (2019). She was last seen playing the role of Nida Saud in Hum TV's Khaas.

== Film ==
Year	Film
2016	8969

== Television ==
Year	Title	Role	Network	Notes	Refs
2012	Veet Miss Super Model 3	Herself	BBC; Broadcast syndication	Lead Role	
2016	Kathputli	Amna	Hum TV	Lead Role	
2017	Yeh Ishq	Mishkaat	ARY Digital	Lead Role	
2017	Ye Raha Dil	Nida	Hum TV	Antagonist	
2018	Aakhri Station	Shumaila	ARY Digital	Lead Role	
2018	Aatish	Sumbul	Hum TV		
2019	Khaas	Nida Saud	Hum TV		

== Music ==
Year	Title	Artist	Notes	Refs
2015	Tere Baajon	Jal	Credited as 'Anam Ahmed'	
2024	Sun Sarkaar	Jal	Bonus track from Aadat (album)	
