= Prem Gali =

Pakistani television series

- Farhan Saeed (left) and Sohai Ali Abro
- Genre: Romantic comedy Dark humour
- Written by: Faiza Iftikhar
- Directed by: Qasim Ali Mureed
- Starring: Farhan Saeed; Sohai Ali Abro
- Country of origin: Pakistan
- Original language: Urdu
- No. of episodes: 32

Production
- Executive producer: Humayun Saeed
- Producers: Humayun Saeed; Shahzad Nasib
- Cinematography: Zeb Rao
- Camera setup: Multi-camera setup
- Running time: approx. 40-42 minutes
- Production company: Six Sigma Plus

Original release
- Network: ARY Digital
- Release: 17 August 2020 – 22 March 2021

Prem Gali (Urdu: پریم گلی, lit. 'Love Street') is a 2020 Pakistani romantic comedy television series that premiered on ARY Digital. It is written by Faiza Iftikhar, directed by Qasim Ali Mureed and produced by Humayun Saeed under Six Sigma Plus. It features Farhan Saeed and Sohai Ali Abro in leading roles.

== Plot ==
The story begins with a band of bachelors (Hamza, his widower elders including his grandfather, father Hatim and paternal uncle Luqman) moving into their new home in a small, lively residential neighborhood called Prem Gali. Hamza catches a glimpse of the pretty Joya, and in a clichéd-turn-of-events it's love at first sight for him. Meanwhile, Joya and her family too are residents of Prem Gali, but are considered infamous and notorious due to the streak of broken marriages running in the household. From her grandmother Rahat, mother Shireen to her maternal aunt Musarrat, all have been divorced yet are empowered and emotional in their ways. There is also a loud and shrewd landlord, Haseena who rents her upper floor to Hamza and the men. While she also runs a marriage bureau, she has an unmarried daughter, Fariya who runs a beauty parlor inside their home.

The fun begins when families of Hamza and Joya encountered with each other. After so many attempts of Hamza, Joya falls in love with him. Both tries to convert their love marriage into arranged one as Joya's mother strongly opposes love marriages. Joya's mother came up with condition that she will accept the proposal of Hamza only if Hamza will stay with them as Ghar Damad (A man who lives with his wife`s parents), on which dispute happened. Later on Tau Hidyat came up to Shireen with solution that make Hamza's family your paying guest, she agreed and finally Joya and Hamza got married.

After marriage, Joya and Hamza, both got irritated by their families as they had to fight with the insecurities of their families. Joya's mother, grandmother and aunt used to give her totally different advices because they didn't want Joya to get divorced as they got, on the other hand Hamza's father, grandfather and uncle couldn't even stand the sneeze of Joya because they didn't want Joya to die as their wives died. Then Joya and Hamza got irritated to face the insecurities and experiments of their families and run away from their home. However Hamza's grandfather took them back by his fake heart attack plan.

Later on, the sweet bickering started between Musarrat and Luqman. Musarat, who had started living a happy life, Luqman fell in love with her. Luqman send his marriage proposal to her but she disagreed. However Luqman reassured her that she would always be happy. In the last episode, they got married.

== Cast ==
- Farhan Saeed as Hamza Hatim
- Sohai Ali Abro as Joya Hamza
- Anoushay Abbasi as Fariha a.k.a. Fari
- Javed Sheikh as Manzoor
  - Shahzad Sheikh as Young Manzoor / Shireen's Husband (flashback)
- Qavi Khan as Dada Jee
- Shamim Hilaly as Rahat
- Saba Hameed as Shireen
  - Jinaan Hussain as Young Shireen (flashback)
- Waseem Abbas as Hatim Chaudhary
- Uzma Hassan as Musarrat
- Abdullah Farhatullah as Luqmaan
- Farah Shah as Haseena
- Faiza Gillani as Nargis
- Fahima Awan as Dua / Hamza's aunt
- Zoya Nasir as Farzana / Hatim's wife
- Abdullah Farhatullah as Hamza's uncle
- Ashraf Khan as Tau Hidayat

== Production ==
=== Background and development ===
After the success of 2017 dark comedy Aangan, the director Qasim Ali Mureed, writer Faiza Iftikhar and producer Humayun Saeed decided to re-unite for another project with light hearted comedy theme. They announced the Project in July 2019.

The Producer choose Saeed and Abro for lead roles making it their second on-screen collaboration together after De Ijazat Jo Tu. The producers also repeat some Aangan actors including Waseem Abbas, Qavi Khan and Uzma Hassan. Shooting started in December 2019. Decided to be premiered in early 2020, it was postponed to August 2020 amid COVID-19 outbreak due to some incompleted shoots.

=== Release ===
The first teaser of the show was released on 5 August 2020 featuring Farhan Saeed and Sohai Ali Abro while the second promo was released on 6 August 2020 featuring Shamim Hilaly, Saba Hameed, Farah Shah, Uzma Hassan, Qavi Khan, Waseem Abbas also.

== Reception ==
=== Ratings ===
Episode	Broadcast date	Weekly rank (in ratings)	Television Rating Points (TRP)
6	21 September 2020	1	6.7
13	9 November 2020	1	6.7
14	16 November 2020	1	6.9
15	23 November 2020	1	7.1
20	28 December 2020	1	6.4

=== Awards and nominations ===
Date of ceremony	Award	Category	Recipient(s) and nominee(s)	Result	References
March 2021	ARY People's Choice Awards	Favorite Drama Serial -Regular	Prem Gali	Nominated	
March 2021	ARY People's Choice Awards	Favorite Ost	Prem Gali	Nominated	
March 2021	ARY People's Choice Awards	Favorite Director	Qasim Ali Mureed	Nominated	
March 2021	ARY People's Choice Awards	Favorite Writer	Faiza Iftikhar	Nominated	
March 2021	ARY People's Choice Awards	Favorite Actor	Farhan Saeed	Nominated	
March 2021	ARY People's Choice Awards	Favorite Actor in a role of Damad	Farhan Saeed	Nominated	
March 2021	ARY People's Choice Awards	Favorite Actress in a role of Bahu	Sohai Ali Abro	Nominated	
March 2021	ARY People's Choice Awards	Favorite Actress in a role of Maa	Shamim Hilaly	Nominated	
March 2021	ARY People's Choice Awards	Favorite Actor in a role of Sasur	Waseem Abbas	Nominated	
March 2021	ARY People's Choice Awards	Favorite Actress in a role of Behtreen Dost	Anoushay Abbasi	Nominated	
March 2021	ARY People's Choice Awards	Favorite Jori	Farhan Saeed and Sohai Ali Abro	Won	
