= Paras Masroor =

Pakistani theatre and television actor

- Born: Karachi, Sindh, Pakistan
- Education: Master's in sociology and mass communication
- Alma mater: University of Karachi
- Occupation: Actor
- Years active: 2011 – present
- Notable work: Carma – The Movie
- Parent(s): Beydil Masroor (father); Beena Masroor (mother)

Paras Masroor is a Pakistani theatre and television actor and screenwriter.

He has played the role of Torah Khan in Momina Duraid's Sang-e-Mar Mar (2016) for which he received Hum Award for Best Supporting Actor. He further appeared in the films Na Maloom Afrad (2014) and Mah e Mir (2016).

== Early life and education ==
He belongs to a Sindhi Sufi family involved in the arts: his grandfather, Ghulam Ali Masroor, who went by the pen-name Faqeer, wrote Sufi poetry in six languages (Arabic, Persian, Urdu, Sindhi, Seraiki and English), while his father, Beydil Masroor, is a musician and writer who also served as senior director/producer for PTV for some 35 years. His mother Beena Masroor is an actress. Paras inherits his interest in the arts from them, as he is involved in sculpture, painting, drawing and music as well (he can play the tabla and the guitar).

He got his Master's in sociology and mass communications from the Karachi University before studying acting at the NAPA.

== Career ==
Starting his career as a theatre actor, he moved on to television. He also wrote content for different channels, such as scripts for Mohammed Ehteshamuddin, and also worked behind the camera as an assistant director.

== Filmography ==
=== Theatre ===
Year	Title	Role	Notes
2011	Bhaag Amina Bhaag	Amina's elder brother	
2011	Jo Chaley Tau Jaan Sae Guzar Gaye		Inspired by Arthur Miller's All My Sons
2012	Nek Parveen		
2012	Kamla	Jai Singh	
2013	Begum Jaan	Sanjay Panday	

=== Films ===
Year	Title	Role	Notes
2014	Na Maloom Afraad	News Reporter	
2016	Mah e Mir	Siraj	
2022	Carma – The Movie	Kidnapper	

=== Television ===
Year	Title	Role	Notes
2012	Jazeera		
2016–2017	Saang e Mar Mar	Torah Khan	
2017	Kitni Girhain Baaki Hain 2	Kashi	Episode 15
2017	Aangan	Zahid	
2017	Aik Thi Rania	Ayyaz	
2018	Mere Khudaya	Kashif; Aleena's brother	
2019	Dolly Darling	Himself	Guest appearance
2019	Gul-o-Gulzar	Jamal	
2019	Yeh Dil Mera	Ali Baksh	
2020	Jhooti	Ahmed	
2021	Pehli Si Muhabbat	Murad	
2021	Mujhay Vida Kar	Iqbal	
2021	Dhoop Ki Deewar	Anurag	Web series released on ZEE5
2021	Parizaad	Asghar	
2021	Hangor S-131	Gulsher	Telefilm
2022	Mere Damad	Farhan	
2023	Mayi Ri	Faraz	
2023	Dhoka		
2023	Grey		
2024	Radd	Jameel	
2025	Dayan		

== Accolades ==
Year	Work	Award	Category	Result
2017	Sang-e-Mar Mar	Hum Awards	Best Supporting Actor	Won
