= Jal Pari (album) =

2004 studio album by Atif Aslam

Studio album by Atif Aslam
- Released: 17 July 2004
- Recorded: 2003–2004
- Genres: Rock, Pop rock
- Length: 41:28
- Language: Urdu
- Label: IC Record
- Producer: Omer Ahmad

Atif Aslam chronology
Jal Pari (2004)	Doorie (2006)

Jal Pari (Urdu: جل پری, lit. 'Mermaid') is the debut studio album by Pakistani singer-songwriter Atif Aslam. It was released on 17 July 2004 through IC record.

It was released sometime after he left the Pakistani rock group Jal. Two of his songs from the album were used by Bollywood film directors. Three songs from the album also featured in the Hollywood film Man Push Cart (2005).

== Accolades ==
Jal Pari was declared the "Best Selling Album of the Year" for two consecutive years (2004 and 2005) by the Pakistani newspaper The News International. The song "Bheegi Yaadein" was named the Most Downloaded Pakistani Song Ever from various Pakistani music websites by Dawn newspaper.

== Copyright issues ==
Since Jal's album Aadat and Jal Pari shared certain tracks such as "Aadat", "Bheegi Yaadein", "Ankhon Se" and "Zindagi", a war over rights began which resulted in both sides claiming to possess hard proof to support their respective claims that they alone owned these songs. Goher Mumtaz of Jal filed a legal lawsuit against Aslam for copyright infringement, which resulted in the court awarding the rights to both parties as both Aslam and Jal shared some songs on their albums.

== Track listing ==
No.	Title	Length
1.	"Zindagi"	4:08
2.	"Yakeen"	4:02
3.	"Aankhon Se"	4:26
4.	"Aadat" (Deep Blue Version)	5:02
5.	"Mahi Ve"	4:00
6.	"Jal Pari"	5:39
7.	"Bheegi Yaadein"	4:07
8.	"Tehzeeb"	2:54
9.	"Gal Sun Ja"	4:09
10.	"Aadat"	4:28
11.	"Ehsaas"	3:44
Total length:		41:28

== Awards ==
Year	Award	Category	Result
2005	4th Lux Style Awards	Best Album	Won
