= Aadat (song) =

2003 song by Atif Aslam and Farhan Saeed

"Aadat" (Urdu: عادت transl. Habit!) is a song by the Pakistani pop rock band Jal. It was sung by Atif Aslam and composed by Aslam and Goher Mumtaz. Originally released as a single in December 2003, it was later included in Jal's album Aadat (sung by Farhan Saeed) and Aslam's solo album Jal Pari. It was also used in the 2005 Bollywood films Kalyug and Chocolate.

== Original version (Jal Pari) ==
"Aadat"

Song by Atif Aslam

from the album Jal Pari
- Language: Urdu
- Released: December 2003
- Genre: Alternative Rock *pop rock
- Length: 4:28 (Aadat); 5:02 (Aadat deep blue version)
- Label: Sadaf Stereo HOM
- Composers: Goher Mumtaz & Atif Aslam
- Lyricists: Goher Mumtaz & Atif Aslam
- Producer: Sarmad Abdul Ghafoor

Atif Aslam singles chronology
"Gal Sun Ja"	"Aadat"	"Ehsaas"
External audio
- Aadat on YouTube

The song was written by Goher Mumtaz and Atif Aslam, sung by Atif Aslam, with music by Jal. Aslam was at the time the lead singer of Jal, and recorded "Aadat" with his pocket money at the age of 17. The band released the song on the internet in December 2003. The song was included in Atif Aslam's first solo album Jal Pari. The song became a youth anthem. By the time the song was formally released, it had become a major hit in the subcontinent, with many radio and TV stations airing it. Another deep blue version of the song was also used in the same album. The music video of the song was directed by Umer Anwar.

The song was featured in Ramin Bahrani's 2005 film Man Push Cart which has won international awards and was praised by critics.

Aslam said in an interview: "I had no idea it was going to do that well" and that he thought the song would make him a "one-hit wonder."

Faizan-ul-Haque, a former VJ on Indus Music, said of the song: "'Aadat' was not the best song of its time, but it is one that the young public connected with the most."

== Mixed version ==
"Aadat" "Bikhra Hoon Main"

Song by Farhan Saeed

from the album Aadat
- Language: Urdu
- Released: 2004
- Genre: Pop music
- Length: 4:29 (Aadat); 8:03 (Bikhra Hoon Main)
- Label: HOM Records
- Composer: Jal
- Lyricist: Jal
- Producers: Zulfiqar Jabbar Khan, Meekal Hasan
External videos
- Bikhra Hoon Main on YouTube

In Jal's first album Aadat, the song was made by Jal, having same composition and lyrics as of Aslam's version. It was sung by Farhan Saeed, as Aslam had left the band at that time. Another song was also made in the same tone as of Aadat with different lyrics named "Bikhra Hoon Main" (Urdu: بکھرا ہوں میں transl. I'm scattered/broken/split).

Farhan Saeed said that he is grateful to his fans all around for accepting and loving his music. He said that "Wo Lamhey" and "Aadat" became youth anthems, not only in Pakistan but also in India and in other countries where people speak Urdu and Hindi.

== Kalyug version ==
"Aadat"

Song by Atif Aslam

from the album Kalyug
- Language: Urdu
- Released: 2005
- Recorded: 2005
- Genre: Pop music
- Length: 5:36 (Atif version); 4:10 (Aadat remix); 4:30 (Jal version)
- Label: Saregama
- Composers: Goher Mumtaz & Atif Aslam (rearranged by Mithoon)
- Lyricist: [Saeed Qadri]
- Producers: Jal, Mithoon

The track "Aadat" was reused in 2005's Mohit Suri film Kalyug with music being recreated by Mithoon under the label Saregama. It was sung by Atif Aslam. The album also included a remix of the song by DJ Suketu. Another version was also used in the film which was sung by Jal. This song has sales over 1,400,000.

=== Credits ===
- Song – Aadat and Aadat (Remix)
- Movie – Kalyug
- Year – 2005
- Singer – Atif Aslam
- Music – Mithoon Sharma, DJ Suketu
- Lyrics – Sayeed Quadri
- Label – Saregama India Limited

Note: All credits taken from YouTube.

== Chocolate version ==
"Zahreeli Raatein"

Song by KK & Shreya Ghoshal

from the album Chocolate
- Language: Hindi
- Released: 2005
- Genre: Pop music, Filmi, Electronic
- Length: 4:50
- Label: T-Series
- Composer: Pritam
- Lyricist: Praveen Bharadwaj
- Producer: Pritam

In 2005 film, Chocolate, directed by Vivek Agnihotri, the song was remade, with music composed by Pritam and lyrics by Praveen Bharadwaj. A solo version version was sung by KK, while a duet version was sung by KK and Shreya Ghoshal. It was titled as Zahreeli Raatein (Urdu: زہریلی راتیں transl. Poisonous/toxic nights).

=== Credits ===
- Song – Zahreeli Raatein
- Film – Chocolate
- Year – 2005
- Singer – K.K. and Shreya Ghoshal
- Music Director – Pritam
- Lyricist – Praveen Bhardwaj
- Label – T-Series

Note: Credits adapted from YouTube.

== Awards and nominations ==
The track won the awards of 'Best Lyrics', 'Best Song' and 'Best Composition' at the 2005 Indus Musik Awards.

Year	Award	Category	Result	Notes
2005	Indus Music Awards	Best Lyrics	Won	Combined awards of Atif Aslam and Jal
2005	Indus Music Awards	Best Song	Won	Combined awards of Atif Aslam and Jal
2005	Indus Music Awards	Best Composition	Won	Combined awards of Atif Aslam and Jal

== Summary of different versions ==
There are several official versions of the song sung by different singers.

- Aadat (original version) by Atif Aslam (composed by Atif and Goher) released in Atif Aslam's Jal Pari in 2004.
- Aadat (deep blue version) by Atif Aslam for his own album Jal Pari in 2004.
- Aadat (and Aadat Remix) by Atif Aslam for the film Kalyug in 2005.
- Aadat by Farhan Saeed in the album Aadat of Jal in 2004.
- Bikhra Hoon Main by Farhan Saeed for the album Aadat of Jal in 2004.
- Zahreeli Raatein (solo version) by Pritam & KK for the film Chocolate in 2005.
- Zahreeli Raatein (duet version) by Pritam, featuring singers KK and Shreya Ghoshal was used for the promotion of the film Chocolate in 2005.

=== In table format ===
Year	Song	Singer(s)	Version	Album/Film	Duration
2004	"Aadat"	Atif Aslam	Original Version	Jal Pari	4:28
2004	"Aadat"	Atif Aslam	Deep Blue Version	Jal Pari	5:02
2004	"Aadat"	Farhan Saeed	Original Version	Aadat	4:29
2004	"Bikhra Hoon Main"	Farhan Saeed	Original Version	Aadat	8:03
2005	"Aadat"	Atif Aslam	Original Version	Kalyug	5:36
2005	"Aadat"	Atif Aslam	Remix Version	Kalyug	4:10
2005	"Aadat"	Jal	Second Version	Kalyug	4:30
2005	"Zahreeli Raatein"	Pritam ft. KK	Solo Version	Chocolate	4:50
2005	"Zahreeli Raatein"	Pritam ft. KK & Shreya Ghoshal	Duet Version	Chocolate	4:52

== Track listings ==
Original Version
No.	Title	Length
1.	"Aadat"	4:28

Deep Blue Version
No.	Title	Length
1.	"Aadat"	5:02

Farhan Saeed Version
No.	Title	Length
1.	"Aadat"	4:29

Original Version
No.	Title	Length
1.	"Bikhra Hoon Main"	8:03

Kalyug Original Version
No.	Title	Length
1.	"Aadat"	5:36

Kalyug Remix Version
No.	Title	Length
1.	"Aadat"	4:10

Kalyug Second Version
No.	Title	Length
1.	"Aadat"	4:30

Solo Version
No.	Title	Length
1.	"Zahreeli Raatein"	4:50

Duet Version
No.	Title	Length
1.	"Zahreeli Raatein"	4:52

== Release history ==
Country	Year	Song	Format	Album/Film	Label	Refs
Pakistan	2003	Aadat	CD Single	Jal Pari	Sadaf Stereo HOM	
Pakistan	2004	Bikhra Hoon Main	CD Single	Aadat	HOM Records	
India	2005	Aadat	CD Single	Kalyug	Saregama	
India	2005	Zahreeli Raatein	CD Single	Chocolate	Super Cassettes Industries Private Limited (T-Series)	

== Controversies ==
After the release of the deep blue version of the song in Atif's single album Jal Pari, there were disputes between Atif and Jal about who held the copyright of the song.
