= Kathputli (TV series) =

Pakistani television series

- Genre: Family drama Serial drama Romantic drama
- Created by: Momina Duraid, Fahim Burney
- Written by: Faiza Iftikhar
- Directed by: Atif Rathore
- Starring: Goher Mumtaz; Anam Goher; Sanam Chaudhry; Farhan Ahmed Malhi
- Theme music composer: Suhail Haider
- Opening theme: Singer; Rasmia Baloch; Lyrics by Suhail Haider
- Composer: Aamir
- Country of origin: Pakistan
- Original language: Urdu
- No. of episodes: 19

Production
- Cinematography: Adnan Ahmad Khan
- Editors: Editors; Ahmed Ali Gharyani; Mehboob; Chief Editor; Rajesh Kumar
- Production company: MD Productions

Original release
- Network: Hum TV
- Release: 11 June – 23 October 2016

Related
- Tere Mere Beech; Kitni Girhain Baaki Hain (season 2)

Kathputli (Urdu: کٹھ پتلی ; lit. 'Puppet') is a Pakistani drama serial that started airing on Hum TV from 11 June 2016 on Saturdays at 8:00 pm. After 5 episodes, it started airing on Sundays at 9:10 pm, giving way to Laaj on Saturdays. It is directed by Atif Rathore and produced by Fahim Burney. It is also produced Momina Duraid under her company MD Productions. It stars Gohar Mumtaz and his wife Anum Mumtaz as her debut in main roles. It ended on 23 October 2016, followed by Kitni Girhain Baqi Hain

It was dubbed in Pashto under the title گوڈاگئ and aired on Hum Pashto 1.

== Plot ==
Kathputli is a story of dignity, love, relation and regret. The story revolves around Mehrunisa, a vivacious girl born into a male dominant household. Mehrunisa dreams of a successful professional life but is bounded by restrictions which keeps her away from pursuing her dreams.

Mehrunisa's friends take her to a farmhouse to celebrate their success in exams where she meets her inevitable fate at the hands of a TV reporter. The incident dents her dignity and honour but her true suffering begins when her own family and fiancé accuse her of wrongdoings and banish her.

What was the incident that led to the destruction of such an innocent soul?

Will the reporter make up for his mistake and will she ever forgive him and her family for not believing in her innocence?

== Cast ==
- Gohar Mumtaz as Sheraz
- Anam Goher as Amna
- Sanam Chaudhry as Mehrunnisa
- Farhan Ahmed Malhi as Ahad
- Samina Ahmad as Sheraz's mother
- Maryam Tewana as Saira
- Farah Nadeem as Zeenat
- Shaheen Khan as Zaitoon Bano
- Khalid Butt as Ahsan & Ahad's father
- Kulsoom Malik
- Benita David as Mehwish
- Anas Ali Imran as Zahir (Ahad's friend)
- Sameera Hassan
- Shazia Batool
- Fashee Sardar as Hassam

== Production ==
In an interview, Anum said, "MD Production - Fahim Burney’s production house has been insisting that I act for them in the past year. But I had different priorities at the time. I was completing my studies and waiting for the right time to make my debut. Of course, working with Gohar felt like the most natural and comfortable way to begin".

== Music ==
The title song of Kathputli is composed and sung by Rasmiya Baloch. It was released in June 2016.

== See also ==
- 2016 in Pakistani television
- List of programs broadcast by Hum TV
