= Yeh Jo Halka Halka Suroor Hai =

Qawwali performed by Nusrat Fateh Ali Khan

Single by Nusrat Fateh Ali Khan
- Language: Urdu
- Released: January 1, 1980
- Recorded: 1979
- Genre: Qawwali
- Label: Oriental Star Agencies
- Composer: Nusrat Fateh Ali Khan
- Lyricists: Abdul Hameed Adam; Anwar Farrukhabadi; Jigar Moradabadi; Nusrat Fateh Ali Khan

“Yeh Jo Halka Halka Suroor Hai” (Urdu: یہ جو ہلکا ہلکا سرور ہے, transl. “This gentle intoxication”) is an Urdu qawwali originally composed and performed by Nusrat Fateh Ali Khan. Its lyrics are drawn primarily from the poetry of Abdul Hameed Adam, with additional verses from Anwar Farrukhabadi and Jigar Moradabadi, along with interpolated verses by Nusrat. One of Nusrat's earliest documented live performances of “Yeh Jo Halka Halka Suroor Hai” took place in 1979 on a tour to the UK. This 1979 performance was recorded and released in 1980 by Oriental Star Agencies (OSA), a British-based Asian music label.

Over the years, the qawwali has appeared on several of Nusrat's albums in different versions and varying lengths. A highly acclaimed studio recording of the track features on his 1990 album Yeh Jo Halka Halka, released by Rehmat Gramophone House. Another popular recording of the track is a truncated version that featured on Nusrat's 1992 Love Songs album, released by Real World Records. Among Nusrat's live renditions of “Yeh Jo Halka Halka Suroor Hai”, the 1983 performances in Birmingham at the Digbeth Civic Centre and Wallace Lawly Centre, are especially well regarded. The enduring popularity of "Yeh Jo Halka Halka Suroor Hai" has inspired numerous covers and reinterpretations by prominent artists. These include renditions by Rahat Fateh Ali Khan, Farhan Saeed, and Stebin Ben. In 1993, singer-songwriter Jeff Buckley paid tribute to Nusrat during a live performance at Sin-é in New York, and delivered a heartfelt rendition of the qawwali.

== Description ==
“Yeh Jo Halka Halka Suroor Hai” expresses a state of gentle yet pervasive spiritual intoxication (suroor), one that overtakes the seeker not through literal wine, but through the presence and gaze of the Beloved, often addressed as the Saqi (cup-bearer). In the language of classical Islamic Sufism, this intoxication serves as a powerful metaphor for a heightened spiritual state in which the heart becomes absorbed in divine love (ishq-e-haqiqi), that is, love for Allah as the Divine Beloved.

The lyrics open with imagery that immediately draws the listener into this symbolic universe of wine, cup-bearer, and ecstatic abandon: “Saqi ki har nigaah pe bal kha ke pee gaya, lehron se khelta hua lehra ke pee gaya” (“At every glance of the cup-bearer, I drank in rapture; I drank while playing with the waves of joy”). Here, “drinking” symbolizes the reception of spiritual grace, while the Saqi represents not a literal tavern figure but a source of divine grace, ultimately referring to Allah as the giver of all love and spiritual intoxication. The image of "playing with the waves" evokes joyful immersion in fluctuating states of spiritual ecstasy (wajd). This opening is followed by a plea for forgiveness: “Ae rehmat-e-tamaam, meri har khata mu'aaf, main inteha-e-shauq mein ghabra ke pee gaya” (“O All-Merciful, please forgive all my wrongs; I drank [the wine of love] in a state of overwhelming, bewildered desire”). This grounds the preceding imagery of ecstasy within an Islamic devotional framework, in which the seeker's awareness of divine mercy (rahma) accompanies spiritual intoxication.

The central refrain deepens this theme: “Yeh jo halka halka suroor hai, yeh teri nazar ka kasoor hai, ke sharaab peena sikha diya” (“This gentle intoxication is due to your gaze, which has taught me how to drink”). It introduces a pivotal Sufi idea, that spiritual transformation often arises through the Beloved's gaze (nazar), a symbol of divine attention or grace that awakens the heart. The lover does not actively choose intoxication but is instead overcome by it, reflecting the Sufi understanding that divine love is ultimately bestowed by Allah, not earned through effort alone. The singer elaborates: “Tere pyaar ne, teri chaah ne, teri behki behki nigaah ne, mujhe ek sharaabi bana diya” (“Your love, your longing, your intoxicating glances have turned me into a drunkard”). This describes the state of spiritual intoxication (sukr) in contrast to sobriety (sahw). Classical Sufi masters such as al-Qushayri, Bayazid Bistami, and Junayd of Baghdad explored this polarity: intoxication dissolves the ego (nafs), allowing a state of heightened nearness to Allah, while sobriety restores balance and ethical grounding. The qawwali lingers in sukr, where ordinary perception is transformed so that day and night, tavern and prayer space alike become suffused with awareness of Allah's presence.

A particularly striking set of verses appears, at first glance, to challenge formal religious practice: “Na namaaz aati hai mujhko, na wuzu aata hai, sajda kar leta hoon jab saamne tu aata hai” (“I do not know prayers, nor ablutions; I prostrate whenever you come before me”), along with “Mere sar ko dar tera mil gaya, mujhe ab talaash-e-haram nahin” (“My head has found your doorstep; I no longer seek the sanctuary”). Taken literally, these lines might seem irreverent. However, within the Islamic Sufi tradition, such verses exemplify the rhetorical style known as rindāna, an intentionally paradoxical and symbolic mode of expression that critiques overly rigid or merely outward religiosity while pointing toward deeper spiritual truths. Rather than rejecting ritual practices such as namaaz (prayer) or wuzu (ablution), the verses emphasize that outward formal rituals are insufficient without inner presence (khushu) and sincerity. In the overwhelming presence of the Divine Beloved (Allah), every moment becomes imbued with the consciousness of worship. The imagery of spontaneous prostration (sajda) thus evokes the Qur’anic ideal of ihsan, which the Prophet Muhammad defined as: "to worship Allah as if you see Him; and if you do not see Him, then know that He sees you." In this state of experiential immediacy, ritual form is not abandoned but deepened through constant awareness of the Divine, such that a single glance at the Beloved is poetically portrayed as carrying the spiritual intensity of prayer. This leads naturally to the Sufi concept of fana (annihilation of the self in Allah), in which the ego dissolves and the soul becomes entirely reoriented toward the Divine.

When the singer declares “Tera pyaar hai bas meri zindagi” (“Your love alone is my life”) and “Main azal se banda-e-ishq hoon, mujhe zuhd-o-kufr ka gham nahin” (“I have been a servant of love since eternity; I care neither for ascetic piety nor for disbelief”), he expresses the philosophy of ishq-e-haqiqi. Love here is primordial, echoing the Qur’anic covenant of Alast (Qur’an 7:172), in which all souls affirmed Allah's lordship before earthly existence. The seeker thus speaks from a state that appears to move beyond conventional categories of sin and virtue, not by negating them, but by being wholly absorbed in the Divine, from whom they ultimately derive their meaning. Ultimately, the qawwali celebrates love as the singer's entire being and purpose, a central Sufi theme of complete surrender (taslim), in which the soul discovers its true home in Allah.
