= Zeher =

2005 Indian film by Mohit Suri

- Theatrical release poster
- Directed by: Mohit Suri
- Screenplay by: Mahesh Bhatt
- Dialogues by: Jay Dixit
- Produced by: Mukesh Bhatt
- Starring: Emraan Hashmi; Shamita Shetty; Udita Goswami
- Cinematography: Fuwad Khan
- Edited by: Akiv Ali
- Music by: Songs: Roop Kumar Rathod; Mithoon; Anu Malik; Naresh Sharma; Jal: the Band; Score: Raju Singh
- Production company: Vishesh Films
- Release date: 25 March 2005
- Running time: 132 minutes
- Country: India
- Language: Hindi
- Budget: ₹5 crore
- Box office: ₹13 crore

Zeher: a Love Story (transl. Poison) is a 2005 Indian Hindi-language mystery thriller film directed by Mohit Suri in his directorial debut and produced by Mahesh Bhatt. The film stars Emraan Hashmi, Shamita Shetty and Udita Goswami. It is an adaptation of the 2003 American film Out of Time. The film was released on 25 March 2005, and was moderately successful at the box office.

== Plot ==
In a small town in Goa the chief of the local police station, Siddharth Mehra is going through a divorce with his wife Sonia whom he still loves, but finds himself involved with a local married woman named Anna Varghese. Unable to cope with the pressures of his wife's success, who is in the special police force, he continues his secret relationship with Anna. But despite his affair with Anna, Siddharth is still in love with Sonia and cannot forget about her.

Things get even more complicated when Siddharth realizes that Anna's husband, Sean, is abusive and Anna is dying from cancer. Being a good soul, Siddharth does not have it in him to abandon this woman, who seems to have given him some affection in recent times.

In the heat of the moment, Siddharth takes an irrational decision to give Anna the money he recovered in a drug raid for her medication in a final effort to save her. Things are not what they seem since Anna dies in a fire that very night. Siddharth now races to uncover a murky trail of drug money, murder, and deceit because all the evidence points to him.

With Sonia heading the case, Siddharth is now in a race against time to find out the real truth behind Anna's murder, recover the drug money, and also win Sonia's love back.

After a bunch of wild goose chases, Siddharth finds out that Anna is alive and was actually controlling Sean and Siddharth in the whole plot to get the insurance money. Siddharth finds this out, and while confronting Anna with the truth, Anna points a gun at him. In the scuffle that follows, Sonia shoots Anna, and she provides the alibi for him, stating that Anna's death was an accident.

Siddharth recovers the lost drug money and reconciles with Sonia.

== Cast ==
- Emraan Hashmi as Siddharth Mehra: Goa Police officer, Sonia's husband
- Shamita Shetty as Sonia Mehra: Special Investigating Officer, Siddharth's wife
- Udita Goswami as Anna Varghese
- Samir Kochhar as Sean Varghese
- Ninad Kamat as James: Siddharth's friend
- Vishwajeet Pradhan as Sooraj Shah: Narcotics Inspector
- Prasad Oak as Nihaal: Sonia's assistant
- Puneet Issar as Rahul Varma
- Paresh Ganatra as Pradip

== Soundtrack ==
Zeher

Soundtrack album by Anu Malik, Mithoon, Roop Kumar Rathod, Jal
- Released: 28 February 2005
- Recorded: 2004
- Genre: Film soundtrack
- Length: 45:05
- Language: Hindi
- Label: Saregama
- Producers: Anu Malik; Mithoon; Roop Kumar Rathod; Jal

The soundtrack was composed by Anu Malik, Roop Kumar Rathod, Mithoon, Jal: The Band and Naresh Sharma with lyrics written by Sayeed Quadri and Shakeel Azmi.

According to the Indian trade website Box Office India, with around 1,800,000 units sold, this film's soundtrack album was the year's fourth highest selling.

No.	Title	Lyrics	Music	Singer(s)	Length
1.	"Agar Tum Mil Jao (Female)"	Sayeed Qadri	Anu Malik	Shreya Ghoshal	06:00
2.	"Woh Lamhe Woh Baatein"	Sayeed Qadri	Mithoon, Jal: the band, Naresh Sharma	Atif Aslam	05:19
3.	"Jaane Ja Jaane Ja"	Shakeel Azmi	Roop Kumar Rathod	Udit Narayan, Shreya Ghoshal	06:33
4.	"Aye Bekhabar"	Shakeel Azmi	Roop Kumar Rathod	KK	05:43
5.	"Agar Tum Mil Jao (Male)"	Sayeed Qadri	Anu Malik	Udit Narayan	06:00
6.	"Lamhe (DJ Mix)" (Remixed by DJ Suketu)	Sayeed Qadri	Mithoon, Jal: the band, Naresh Sharma	Atif Aslam	04:41
7.	"Zamana Chhod Denge Hum"	Sayeed Qadri	Anu Malik	Udit Narayan	04:36
8.	"Agar Tum Mil Jao (Instrumental)"	Instrumental	Anu Malik	Instrumental	06:00

== Reception ==
Jaspreet Pandohar of BBC.com gave the film 3 out of 5 stars, writing, "Zeher is a good example of how the new generation of contemporary Bollywood films are capable of handling sexual themes in a mature and entertaining manner." Patcy N of Rediff.com wrote that "The film is just about watchable, because of the story in the second half. It's the kind of film that's decent timepass, provided you are watching it at home on television".

== Awards ==
Nominations:

- Filmfare Award for Best Male Playback Singer (2005) – Atif Aslam
- Filmfare Award for Best Female Playback Singer (2005) – Shreya Ghoshal
- Zee Cine Award for Best Popular Track of the Year (2005)
- Zee Cine Award for Best Playback Singer – Male (2005) – Atif Aslam
- IIFA Award for Best Male Playback Singer (2006) – Atif Aslam
- Screen Award for Best Debut Director (2006) – Mohit Suri
- Screen Award for Best Playback Singer – Male (2006) – Atif Aslam
