= Beena Masroor =

Pakistani actress (1958–2025)

- بينا مسرور
- Born: Mahjabeen Beena; 29 January 1958; Hyderabad, West Pakistan, Pakistan
- Died: 3 December 2025 (aged 67)
- Education: University of Sindh
- Occupations: Actress; writer; director
- Years active: 1976–2025
- Spouse: Bedil Masroor (husband)
- Children: Paras Masroor (son)
- Parent: Salahuddin Ahmed Baloch (father)

Beena Masroor (Sindhi and Urdu: بينا مسرور; 29 January 1958 – 3 December 2025) was a Pakistani actress, writer and director. She appeared in television dramas such as Dil Banjaara, Aangan, Betiyaan, Agar and Jaan-e-Jahan.

== Early life ==
Masroor was born in Hyderabad, West Pakistan, Pakistan on 29 January 1958. She completed her early education from Hyderabad School and graduated from University of Sindh. Her father, Salahuddin Ahmed Baloch, was a Deputy Superintendent and her mother was a housewife.

== Career ==
Masroor worked in many Sindhi dramas Obeyant, Travel and Companion, Mathar, Keedu Karonbhar, Peera, Nakili, Bare Han Bhanbhur Mein and Khali Gohar.

Later she wrote two dramas in Sindhi Nili and Topo which were directed by Bedil Masroor and Mohammad Bakhsh Sameeji. Beena Masroor also directed some dramas Har Jeet, Zindagi Ek Kan, Moort, Saniheh Ji Suk and Dil Ka Maamala.

Masroor also worked in commercials and advertisements, later she began to write poetry for magazines also for Sindhi-language magazines and newspapers using her pen name Beena.

She later appeared in dramas Vasl-e-Yaar, Dil Banjaara, Tarap, Betiyaan, Agar and Jaan-e-Jahan.

== Personal life and death ==
Beena was married to singer Bedil Masroor. The couple had seven children. Their son Paras Masroor is an actor and screenwriter. Beena Masroor died on 3 December 2025, at the age of 67.

== Filmography ==
=== Television ===
Year	Title	Role	Network
1976	Manzil	Bina	PTV
1984	Oondah Ain Roshni	Zareen	PTV
1987	Sabajha Supreen	Jannat	PTV
1994	Milkiyat	Amber	PTV
2015	Vasl-e-Yaar	Shayan's mother	ARY Digital
2016	Saheliyaan	Munna's mother	ARY Digital
2016	Dil Banjaara	Ayaz's mother	Hum TV
2018	Aangan	Mazhar's mother	Hum TV
2020	Tarap	Zunaira's grandmother	Hum TV
2022	Ishq Nahin Aasan	Shamshir's mother	Aan TV
2022	Betiyaan	Laiq's mother	ARY Digital
2023	Agar	Muthair's mother	Hum TV
2023	Jaan-e-Jahan	Kishwar's mother	ARY Digital
2025	Naqaab	Ishrat's mother	ARY Digital
