= Uff Yeh Mohabbat =

- Title poster
- Genre: Romance
- Written by: Faiza Iftikhar
- Directed by: Amin Ali
- Theme music composer: Goher Mumtaz
- Country of origin: Pakistan
- Original language: Urdu

Production
- Production company: A&B Entertainment

Original release
- Network: Geo TV
- Release: 19 February – 19 October 2014

Uff Yeh Mohabbat (Urdu: اف یہ محبت, lit. 'Oh, This Love') is a 2014 Pakistani romantic drama serial airing on Geo TV. It is written by Faiza Iftikhar, directed by Amin Ali and is a production of A&B Entertainment. The drama was first aired on 19 January 2014 on Geo TV, starring Goher Mumtaz as Sameer, Jugan Kazim as Ghazal, Meharbano as Dilkash, Hina Bayat as Firdous, Mnazoor Qureshi as Nana and others. The story revolves around two characters, Sameer and Dilkash. Sameer is a mature guy who loves music, he will be appointed as a music teacher in the school where Dilkash is studying. Dilkash is a very lively and immature girl who hasn’t experienced any difficulties in life and eventually she will fall madly in love with her music teacher. Retitled as Guitar Se Piyaar, it also aired in India on Zindagi.

== Plot ==
The serial follows Sameer and Dilkash, whose relationship is shaped by their contrasting personalities. Sameer is a serious, self-made man who has confidence in himself and makes decisions carefully. In contrast, Dilkash is lively and carefree, viewing life as a party that one is invited to only once.

Their differences initially lead to their union but eventually cause the breakdown of their relationship. The serial explores how their contrasting natures contribute to their separation and the collapse of their otherwise loving relationship. Ultimately, they overcome their differences and reunite, demonstrating that love triumphs over the obstacles between them.

== Cast ==
- Goher Mumtaz as Sameer
- Juggan Kazim as Ghazal
- Mehar Bano as Dilkash
- Hina Khawaja Bayat as Firdous
- Naima Khan as Rukiya
- Manzoor Qureshi as Nana
- Fahad Shaikh as Ali

== Music ==
The sound track of this drama is Uff Yeh Mohabbat (Laiyan Laiyan), sung by Goher Mumtaz of Jal and Hadiqa Kiani. While the song is recorded, mixing and mastered by GM Studioz. The song was released on Geo TV on Valentine's Day.
