= Ana (2004 TV series) =

Pakistani drama TV series

- Title screen
- Genre: Drama
- Written by: Seema Ghazal
- Directed by: Syed Suleman
- Starring: Talat Hussain; Humayun Saeed; Samina Peerzada; Aamna Sharif; Shahzad Nawaz; Javeria Saud; Aijaz Aslam; Nazli Nasr; Parveen Akbar; Ahsan Khan; Shehroz Sabzwari; Parveen Akbar; Javeria Abbasi
- Theme music composer: Sonu Nigam
- Opening theme: Shreya Ghoshal
- Composer: Jatin-Lallit
- Country of origin: Pakistan
- Original language: Urdu
- No. of episodes: 35

Production
- Executive producer: Salman Nanitalwala
- Producers: Humayun Saeed; Abdullah Kadwani
- Production company: 7th Sky Entertainment

Original release
- Network: Geo TV"
- Release: August 2004 – 2004

Ana (English: Ego Urdu: انا) is a 2004 Pakistani drama that aired on Geo Entertainment. It is a story about an egotistic man and the people who are part of his life.

== Cast ==
- Talat Hussain
- Humayun Saeed
- Samina Peerzada
- Shahzad Nawaz
- Javeria Saud
- Aamna Sharif
- Aijaz Aslam
- Parveen Akbar
- Raju Jamil
- Javeria Abbasi
- Ahsan Khan
- Nazli Nasr
- Shehroz Sabzwari
- Kunickaa Sadanand
- Parikshit Sahni

== Production ==
The series featured actors from Pakistan and India, and was shot in Dubai.

== Awards ==
=== 4th Lux Style Awards ===
- Best TV Play (Satellite)-Won
- Best TV Actor (Satellite)-Talat Hussain-Nominated
- Best TV Actress (Satellite)-Samina Peerzada-Nominated
