= Agar (TV series) =

Pakistani television series

- Urdu: اگر
- Written by: Madiha Shahid
- Directed by: Ilyas Kashmiri
- Starring: Juggan Kazim; Junaid Khan; Hina Altaf; Usama Khan
- Country of origin: Pakistan
- Original language: Urdu
- No. of episodes: 32

Production
- Executive producer: Momina Duraid
- Production company: MD Productions

Original release
- Network: Hum TV
- Release: 25 October 2022 – 30 May 2023

Agar is a 2022 Pakistani television series directed by Ilyas Kashmiri and produced by Momina Duraid under banner MD Productions. It stars Hina Altaf, Junaid Khan, Juggan Kazim and Usama Khan in leading roles. The series was first broadcast on 25 October 2022 on Hum TV in night prime-time slot.

== Plot ==
Annie, a school principal by profession and the sole breadwinner of her family, has not married due to her responsibilities being elder among her siblings. She notices Shahwaiz, a teacher in her school who takes active interest in her. Annie's younger sister, Hooriya aspires to get a luxury lifestyle with her husband as she has seen her sister struggling her whole life. She starts dreaming these dreams with Farrukh when she encounters him, who is a young boy who falls for her and later sends proposal to her house. Annie's youngest sister, Chandi too aspires to become as successful as her eldest sister as at the time of her birth, her mother wants a boy.

== Cast ==
- Junaid Khan as Shahwaiz
- Juggan Kazim as Annie
- Hina Altaf as Hooriya
- Usama Khan as Farrukh
- Ali Abbas as Muthair
- Hina Khawaja Bayat as Annie's mother
- Maheen Siddiqui as Chandni
- Ismat Zaidi as Shahwaiz's mother
- Ahmed Randhawa as Behram
- Behroze Sabzwari as Shahwaiz's father
- Hira Soomro as Zainab
- Beena Masroor as Muthair's mother
- Fareeda Shabbir as Zainab's mother
- Salma Asim as Farrukh's mother

== Production ==
While giving detailed insight about her acting comeback, Kazim stated in conservation with DAWN Images that she is playing a school principal in the series opposite Khan's character. She also stated that Altaf is paired with Khan. In conversation with Roznama Dunya, Kazim stated that her character is of a girl who sacrifices her own life to support her family, and faces societal criticism when she marries a younger man as she grows older. The series marked the acting comeback of Kazim after almost eight years. The series is written by Madiha Shahid, while directed by Ilyas Kashmiri.

== Reception ==
=== Critical reception ===
While reviewing the first 4-5 episodes, a reviewer from the Youline Magazine, praised the performances of the cast and pace of the series, but criticized the casting of Junaid Khan as he is depicted as a younger guy, early to mid 20s. Rabia Al-Raba of the Independent Urdu praised the dialogues, stating them as "powerful and philosophical".
