= Talwandi Musa Khan =

Pakistani village

Coordinates: 32°12′N 74°18′E

Talwandi Musa Khan is a village near Gujranwala Punjab, Pakistan. It is the birthplace of Abdul Hameed Adam. Former Governor state bank Mumtaz Hasan, and the first woman Olympian from Pakistan, Shabana Akhtar.

Population of Talwandi Musa Khan is nearly 20000 according to 2017 Census. Most of the residents work in agriculture. One Government Dispensary, Private hospital, Government High schools for Boys girls are serving the area.
