= Yeh Ishq =

2016 Pakistani television series

- Genre: Romance, drama
- Written by: Asma Sayani
- Directed by: Badar Mehmood
- Country of origin: Pakistan
- Original language: Urdu
- No. of episodes: 21

Production
- Producers: Fahad Mustafa and Dr. Ali Kazmi.
- Production location: Karachi
- Running time: 40 mintutes
- Production company: Big Bang Entertainment

Original release
- Network: ARY Digital
- Release: 30 November 2016 – 19 April 2017

Yeh Ishq is a Pakistani drama television series directed by Badar Mehmood, and written by Asma Sayani. It originally aired on ARY Digital in 2016-17.

== Plot ==
"Yeh Ishq" is the love story of Maaz and Mishkaat. Mishkaat is a young girl who is full of life. She falls in love with Maaz and promises him to be his bride. Maaz too madly loves Mishkaat and wants her to be with him for the rest of his life. He is a stubborn child of a family who would go out of their way to make things work out for him.

Maaz's aunt is the sole decision maker of the family and does not want Maaz to marry Mishkaat because she wants everything to be according to her wish. Furthermore, another character – Neha who's a very decent girl loves Maaz and everybody in the family, even Maaz's aunty wants her to be his bride. However first Mishkat disagrees to this wedding because of her mom and she gets engaged to another guy who loves her. It is a wedding of one of their friends Mishkaats fiancé forgets to pick her up so as Maaz is there he offers to give her a lift. Instead he takes her to his farmhouse and forces her to do nikkah with him. She disagrees and cries but he goes mental and has to make Mishkat his hence the nikkah happens.

The story goes through ups and downs with countless twists and turns.

== Cast ==
- Asma Abbas
- Natalia Awais as Neha
- Anum Ahmed as Mishkaat
- Shahzad Noor as Maaz
- Sajid Hassan
- Atiqa Odho
- Shaheen Zamali
- Zainab Qayyum
- Shaista Jabeen
- Qavi Khan
- other

== Soundtrack ==
Yeh Ishq – OST

Soundtrack album by Rahat Fateh Ali Khan
- Released: 1 December 2016
- Recorded: 2016
- Genre: Television soundtrack
- Length: (6:12)
- Language: Urdu
- Label: ARY Digital

Music video
- "Yeh Ishq" OST on YouTube

The title song was sung by Rahat Fateh Ali Khan. The music was composed by and the lyrics were written by Asma Sayani.Yeh Ishq on SoundCloud

== Accolades ==
Year	Award	Category	Recipients	Result
2017	Lux Style Awards	Best Original Soundtrack	Rahat Ali Khan	Nominated
