= Yeh Raha Dil =

Pakistani comedy serial

- Genre: Serial drama; Family drama; Romantic comedy
- Written by: Mustafa Afridi
- Directed by: Siraj-ul-Haque
- Starring: Ahmed Ali Akbar; Yumna Zaidi; Adnan Jaffar; Anam Goher; Arjumand Hussain; Imran Peerzada; Ayesha Sana
- Opening theme: Singers; Atif Ali; Samra Khan; Lyrics by S.K Khalish; Siraj ul Haq
- Composer: Atif Ali
- Original language: Urdu
- No. of seasons: 1
- No. of episodes: 26

Production
- Producer: Momina Duraid
- Production locations: Nepal, Pakistan
- Cinematography: Zeb Rao; Azhar Ali
- Camera setup: Multi-camera setup
- Running time: 40 minutes
- Production company: MD Productions

Original release
- Network: Hum TV
- Release: 13 February – 21 August 2017

Related
- Sanam; Pagli

Yeh Raha Dil (Urdu: یہ رہا دل, lit. 'Here is the Heart') is a Pakistani drama serial which premiered on Hum TV on 13 February 2017, starring Ahmed Ali Akbar, Yumna Zaidi and Anam Goher as main leads. It was preceded by Sanam. The series was directed by Siraj-ul-Haque. The audience highly praised Ahmed Ali Akbar and Yumna Zaidi's chemistry. It is based on the Turkish romantic comedy series İlişki Durumu: Karışık, which in turn was based on the South Korean series Full House. The Turkish series aired in Pakistan as "Mein Ayeshagul".

== Plot ==
Hayat (Yumna Zaidi) is a young girl whose mother has died and whose father deserted her at a young age, she lives alone in a house and has financial issues, but even that does not dampen her spirits. Instead, she is always in a good mood and adds life to her surrounding.

Zaki (Ahmed Ali) wants to be a chef and marry Nida ( Anam Goher), a model. His father opposes this union and forbids his son to take this step. Desperate to marry Nida, Zaki leaves home and goes to Nepal, where he bumps into Hayat on the plane.

She, too, has been sent there by her friends so she can relax and write a good story which can get published to solve her monetary issues. With Zaki's mom involved in the plan, she plays the emotional card with her husband so he agrees to her son's demands. Hayat and Zaki, now in Nepal, often meet as Hayat faces residential and financial issues while in Nepal, running to Zaki and asking for his help each time.

These meets lead to a fiasco as Nida videocalls Zaki and hears Hayat in the background (who has yet again approached Zaki in his room for one of her issues), leading to misunderstandings between the two. A while later, certain events lead to Hayat telling Nida that Zaki plans to marry her instead, and the two will return to Pakistan after their Nikah. It further leads to misunderstandings between Nida and Zaki. Zaki, in anger, immediately leaves for Pakistan despite Hayat trying to convince him not to leave her alone.

Dejected, Hayat stays for a few more days and decides to return home once she runs out of money. On returning, while Zaki has managed to convince his parents and Nida that Hayat was just someone he had run into in Nepal and was not a fling, Hayat comes back to find that her house has been sold off by her friend Salman (who sent her to Nepal in the first place) and is missing. She tries to look for him but to no avail.

Hayat sneaks into the house at night and decides to stay there, but fate leads her to cross paths with Zaki again. Zaki's father had bought Hayat's house as an investment slash ultimatum for Zaki. He wanted Zaki to convert the place into a restaurant and make it successful in six months to marry Nida.

Zaki sympathizes with Hayat. He discusses with Nida that it's unfair to take Hayat's house away. Nida, who already dislikes Hayat, disagrees with Zaki and gets mad. Hayat takes her luggage and walks on the streets when two robbers try to mug her. Hayat, being emotionally spent, screams at the robbers to kill her. While she yells, the robbers steal her luggage and run off. Zaki drives his car, looking for Hayat, and finds her crying on the street. He then takes her to his house, where he convinces his parents to let her stay until they can find a solution. Hayat states that she is willing to stay in the servant quarters and pay rent until she can figure out how to repay the family for purchasing the house, to which everyone agrees.

During this time, Zaki's father takes note of Zaki's compassion towards Hayat and feels that he is falling in love with her, who he deems to be a much better partner for his son than Nida. After that, Nida's parents come to Pakistan from Dubai to plan for her wedding. Nida tells them that her father-in-law has put on one condition until Zaki and Nida can establish a restaurant business within six months, there will be no marriage.

Nida's father wanted to see where the restaurant was going to establish. He had returned to Pakistan after twenty years. On seeing the house Hayat Manzil, he wanted more information about the owners from Zaki. Zaki informed him that the house belonged to Hayat, until it was bought by his father. Zaki, discovering that Aafaq is Hayat's father, thinks to surprise Hayat by having the two meet in the garden, unaware of the strained relationship between the two.

At the same time, Nida and her mother are standing on the rooftop, gazing over the garden, when Nida notes that her father seems quite distressed, asking her mother why. Her mother brushes off the question, responding maliciously and degrading her father. Nida shocked at her mother's response, asks what was going on between her parents. Her mother states that they had decided to separate once they got Nida married. Nida is heartbroken at the news. Once Hayat and Aafaq meet, Hayat faints out of shock and is taken to the hospital.

The next day Aafaq begs and insists on speaking to Hayat to reconnect with his daughter and attempt to have a father-daughter relationship with her. Hayat begrudgingly agrees to meet with Aafaq. She confronts Aafaq in a hotel lobby, demanding to know why he abandoned her and her mother, why he displaced someone else's life for his happiness and how he had ruined everything himself. She ends by stating that she doesn't consider Aafaq her father nor will ever, and that she never wants to see or speak to him again. Hayat leaves her father in the lobby to ponder over what he has done.

Hayat goes upstairs to confront Zaki (who is with Nida) about why he forced her into such a difficult situation, scolding him over it. Zaki apologizes, but then a hotel employee rushes over to tell them that Aafaq suffered a heart attack. They rush him to the hospital. Enraged, Nida threatens to never forgive Hayat if anything happens to her father. Zaki's father arrives at the hospital and asks Zaki and Nida what happened. Zaki informs his father of the situation, while Nida interjects, stating that this was all Hayat's fault and that she should be evicted from her house. Zaki and his father both state that this isn't possible and that they should all focus on Aafaq's health and recovery.

The next morning Nida informs her mother that her father suffered a heart attack, and both go to the hospital to look after Aafaq. Aafaq is cynical of his wife's attitude, stating that she only needs him for his money, which he assured her would still be available to them even if he died. Hayat visits her father in the hospital, where they both reconcile and learn to forgive one another and move on. At the same time, however, Nida is becoming more anxious at her father's reconciliation with his oldest daughter as well as Zaki's increased interest and attention towards Hayat.

Afaaq and his family move in with Hayat and live as a family. Zaki realises he always cared for Nida but never loved her, and he truly loves Hayat. He confesses it to Hayat, but Hayat refuses him as she can't betray her sister. Nida senses it, obsesses with Zaki and decides that she will only marry him, although knowing his feelings. Zaki remains oblivious to it. She pretends to be happy with Hayat. Meanwhile, Hayat frequently fights with her new colleague and rival, Hassan. However, soon Hassan extends his hand for friendship.

Zaki tells his father about his feelings, but when he learns that Hayat had refused, he tells Zaki to marry Nida and not play with both the girls' self-respect. Zaki finally tells his decision to Nida, but Nida pretends to think that Zaki is only testing her love. Zaki finally decides to marry Nida in frustration. On their engagement day, Zaki makes Hayat confess her feelings for him. Zaki then plays a game and tells Hassan and Afaaq that Hayat wants to marry Hassan. Thus Hayat and Hassan's wedding also gets fixed. Hayat is shocked to know, but she plays along to save Nida and Zaki's marriage.

Hayat asks Afaaq to reconcile with his wife and ask for forgiveness. Afaaq does so, but his wife disagrees as she has already committed to a man in London. Hayat thus plays a game with that man and learns he is cheating on Afaaq's wife. Hayat thus exposes him in front of Afaaq's wife. Afaaq and his wife reconcile. Nida's ex-boyfriend Tabrez returns and threatens her about exposing her pictures. Nida tells it to Hayat and Zaki, and both support her. They find that Tabrez has nothing. Nida is amazed at how Zaki stands for her and is ashamed of all her planning and plotting and her decision to force him to marry her even though Zaki expressed his feelings. Nida finally backs off from the wedding and tells Hassan the truth. Hassan and Hayat's engagement also breaks off. Hayat sees Salman on the beach, where he confesses that he lost everything and is guilty of what he had done. Hayat forgives him. Hayat and Zaki finally express their feelings for each other. The show ends as Hayat and Zaki travel around the world.

== Cast ==
- Ahmed Ali Akbar as Zaki Haroon Baig : Haroon's son; Hayat's love interest
- Yumna Zaidi as Hayat Aafaaq : Afaaq's older daughter; Nida's older half sister; Zaki's love interest
- Anam Goher as Nida Afaaq : Afaaq's younger daughter; Zaki's ex fiancée; Hayat's younger half sister
- Ayesha Sana as Fatima Afaaq : Afaaq's wife; Nida's mother; Hayat's step mother
- Adnan Jaffar as Jimmy
- Afraz Rasool as Tabrez : Nida's ex boyfriend
- Hammad Farooqui as Hassan : Hayat's ex fiancé
- Syeda Zahra Shah as Sidra
- Imran Peerzada as Aafaaq : Hayat and Nida's father
- Ehteshamuddin as Dilbar Jahangeer DJ
- Danial Afzal Khan as Salman : Hayat's friend
- Hira Hussain as Ragni
- Azra Mohyeddin as Mrs. Baig : Haroon's wife; Zaki's mother
- Arjumand Hussain as Haroon Baig, Zaki's father
- Mariam Mirza as Madam

== Soundtrack ==
The OST of 'Yeh Raha Dil' is sung by singers Atif Ali and Samra Khan. They had previously sung the song of the drama Gila together.

== Reception ==
In 2021, Masala! placed it among the 10 Pakistani dramas to watch and "this drama takes you on an emotional rollercoaster with highly confused characters, but the show ears points for being different. It is frustration-free, silly and does not bog the audience down with a heavy storyline".

== See also ==
- 2017 in Pakistani television
