= Boondh =

2007 studio album by Jal

Studio album by Jal
- Released: 14 December 2007
- Recorded: 2006–2007
- Studio: Digital Fidelity Studio, Lahore, Pakistan
- Genre: Alternative rock Pop rock
- Length: 61:35
- Label: Fire Records, Tips Records
- Producer: Mekaal Hasan

Jal chronology
Aadat (2004)	Boondh (2007)	Pyaas (2013)

Singles from Boondh
- 1. "Sajni" Released: 15 December 2007; 2. "Chalte Chalte" Released: 24 March 2008; 3. "Main Mast Hoon" Released: 26 August 2008; 4. "Moray Piya" Released: 14 November 2008; 5. "Yeh Mera Pakistan" Released: 27 September 2009; 6. "Humain Itna Pyaar" Released: 16 November 2009

Alternative cover
- Album art for Indian release

External audio
- Jukebox playlist on YouTube

Boondh (Urdu: بوند transl. A Drop of Water) is the second album by the Pakistani pop/rock band Jal, released on 14 December 2007, three years after the release of the band's debut Aadat. The first single from the album, "Sajni", was a major hit all over Pakistan.

== Singles ==
Singles from the album were "Sajni", "Moray Piya", "Yeh Mera Pakistan", "Main Mastt Hoon", "Humein Itna Pyaar" and "Chalte Chalte".

== Track listing ==
All tracks are written by Goher Mumtaz, except where noted.

Boondh
No.	Title	Writer(s)	Length
1.	"Sajni"		5:06
2.	"Raatein"		4:31
3.	"Humain Itna Pyaar"		5:33
4.	"Moray Piya"		4:30
5.	"Main Mastt Hoon (Dhamaal)"		5:03
6.	"Mahia"		4:58
7.	"Payal"		5:51
8.	"Chup Chup"		4:10
9.	"Kia Se Kia"	Farhan Saeed Butt, arranged by Jal and Salman Albert	4:05
10.	"Yeh Mera Pakistan"		5:28
11.	"Sajni" (Slow Version)		5:45
12.	"Humain Itna Pyaar" (Slow Version)		6:15
Total length:			61:35

Limited edition
No.	Title	Writer(s)	Length
13.	"Chalte Chalte"	Mumtaz; Saeed	3:53
14.	"Humain Itna Pyaar (Reprise)"		6:01

== Personnel ==
Credits taken from the album liner notes.

Jal

- Farhan Saeed Butt – lead vocals on all tracks except "Humain Itna Pyaar", "Mahia" and "Chup Chup"
- Goher Mumtaz – guitars, vocals on "Humain Itna Pyaar", "Mahia", "Chup Chup" and "Yeh Mera Pakistan", co-production on guitar tones
- Aamir "Shazi" Sheraz – bass guitar

Additional musicians

- Salman Albert – drums on all tracks except "Main Mastt Hoon (Dhamaal)", "Mahia", "Kia Se Kia" and "Chup Chup"
- John "Gumby" Louis Pinto – drums on "Main Mastt Hoon (Dhamaal)", "Mahia", "Kia Se Kia" and "Chup Chup"
- Ali Mustafa – loops and keyboards
- Ijaz Ali – harmonium on "Main Mastt Hoon (Dhamaal)"
- Babar Khanna – percussion on "Main Mastt Hoon (Dhamaal)"

Production

- Mekaal Hasan – production, mixing
- Maram and Aabroo – photography
- Murtaza "Murzie" Niaz at Salieh Interactive – album cover concept and design
- Munib Narwaz and Karighar – wardrobe

== Awards and nominations ==
Awarded for Best Album of the Year at the 7th Lux Style Awards in 2008.
