= Farhan Saeed =

Pakistani actor and singer (born 1984)

- فرحان سعید بٹ
- Born: Farhan Saeed Butt; 14 September 1984 (age 42); Lahore, Punjab, Pakistan
- Education: National University of Computer and Emerging Sciences
- Notable work: Udaari (2016); Suno Chanda (2018–2019); Mere Humsafar (2021–2022)
- Spouse: Urwa Hocane (m. 2016)
- Children: 1
- Relatives: Mawra Hocane (sister-in-law); Ameer Gilani (brother-in-law)
- Musical career
- Origin: Lahore, Pakistan
- Genres: Pop; Rock
- Instruments: Vocals; Guitar
- Years active: 2003–present
- Formerly of: Jal (band)

Farhan Saeed (born 14 September 1984) is a Pakistani singer-songwriter, actor and entrepreneur. Saeed is the former lead vocalist of the Pakistani band Jal and owns the Cafe Rock restaurant in Lahore. He sings in Urdu and Punjabi. He made his acting debut with the drama De Ijazat Jo Tu (2014).

Saeed had his breakthrough with Udaari (2016), for which he received the Hum Award for Best Supporting Actor nomination. He earned wider recognition with his portrayals in Suno Chanda (2018), Suno Chanda 2 (2019) and Mere Humsafar (2021-22). The former won him Hum Award for Best Actor Popular. Saeed made his film debut with Tich Button (2022).

== Early life and education ==
The full name of Farhan Saeed is Farhan Saeed Butt. He belongs to a family of medical professionals; his father and both brothers are all doctors. Saeed did his A-Level from the Keynesian Institute of Management & Sciences (KIMS), Lahore in 2001, and later pursued a B.Sc. in Computer Science. He had studied the subject at the National University of Computer and Emerging Sciences (FAST-NU), where other musicians were his seniors, including "Xulfi" Khan and Fawad Khan, which would ignite his interest in music.

== Music career ==
=== Jal the band ===
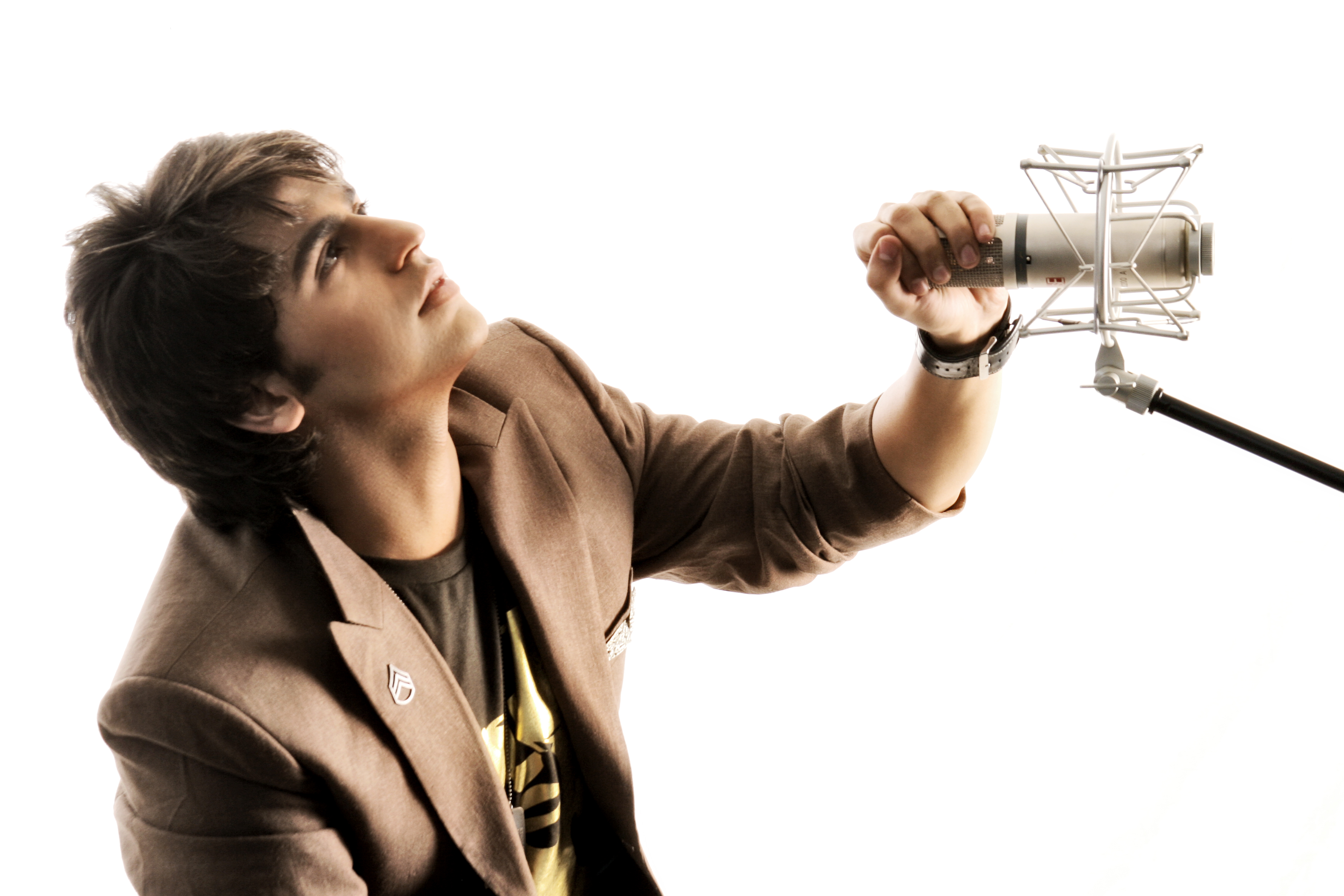
Saeed during Jal band days

Saeed first rose to prominence when he joined the Lahore-based pop rock band Jal, at the age of 17, as a vocalist. Saeed replaced Atif Aslam in 2003, who quit because of musical differences with Jal's founding member Goher Mumtaz.

=== Solo music career ===
In September 2011, in an exclusive interview with The Express Tribune, Saeed shocked the fans claiming that he had left Jal to pursue a solo career despite Goher Mumtaz offering him to continue his solo career while being a part of Jal. On 8 September 2011, Saeed's departure was confirmed by Jal's guitarist Goher Mumtaz who wished him luck for his solo career. He did a collaboration with Aima Baig, Adnan Qazi and Bilal Saeed for the song "Na cher malangaan nu". His song with Hania Aamir for Asim Jofa was directed by Qasim Ali Mureed.

He made his Bollywood-singing debut in 2014, by contributing a song to Vikram Bhatt's Creature 3D. The song, Naam-e-Wafa, is a romantic-duet, with Indian vocalist Tulsi Kumar as a co-singer and Mithoon as the composer.

== Acting career ==
Saeed started his acting career by debuting in a leading role in the 2014 Hum TV drama serial De Ijazat Jo Tu alongside Sohai Ali Abro, Saba Hameed and Javaid Sheikh. He then played the lead role as Mohid Shuja in ARY Digital's Mere Ajnabi alongside Urwa Hocane who was the female lead. He has also played the lead role of Arsh in the drama Udaari as a lawyer along with female lead Urwa. Apart from acting in the drama, Saeed has also collaborated with Hadiqa Kiani for the OST that has topped music charts all over Pakistan.

In 2016, he also played the lead role again in ARY Digital's Teri Chah Mein, alongside Maria Wasti and Saboor Ali, and Hum TV's Sila alongside Ainy Jaffri.

In 2018 he grabbed the leading role of Arsal Jamshed Ali (Arsal) in Hum TV's drama serial Suno Chanda, with Iqra Aziz as the leading female role, and due to the critical success of the show, a season 2 was immediately announced by the producers. He reprised his role as Arsal Jamshed Ali in the second installment of Suno Chanda alongside Iqra Aziz in 2019. The season was also a critical success.

He had the leading role in Karachi Se Lahore 3 with Kubra Khan as co-star, the third installment of Wajahat Rauf's successful series including Karachi Se Lahore and Lahore Se Aagey which would have been his feature film debut, but he had to quit the project because of music tours and concerts he was already committed to.

In early 2019 it was announced that Saeed would appear in his first lead film role in Tich Button, a rom-com co-produced by his wife Urwa Hocane under their joint new production company Shooting Star Studio. After some delay, the movie was released in 2022.

== Other work ==
=== Direction ===
He turned to direction with the 2018 music video of O Jaana from the singer-songwriter Hamza Malik, starring actress Iqra Aziz and featuring musicians Rahat Fateh Ali Khan and Sahir Ali Bagga.

== Personal life ==
Saeed married Urwa Hocane on 16 December 2016, in Lahore, Pakistan. On 6 October 2023, Saeed and Hocane announced their pregnancy through social media.

== Discography ==
=== Film songs ===
All films are Pakistani except where noted

Year	Film	Song	Music	Lyrics	Co-singer(s)	Note
2012	Dil Tainu Karda Ae Pyar	"Kyun Gayee"	Jaidev Kumar	Kumaar		Punjabi film
2012	Qasam Se Qasam Se	"Meethi Yaadein"	Sayanti-Shailendra	Shailendra Kumar		Hindi film, as member of Jal
2014	Creature 3D	"Naam-e-Wafa"	Mithoon		Tulsi Kumar	Hindi film
2014	Main Aur Mr. Riight	"Bhool Na Jaana"	Astiva Band			Hindi film
2017	Punjab Nahi Jaungi	"Rab Rakha"	Ali Mustafa	Himself		
2017	Half Girlfriend	"Thodi Der"	Himself	Kumaar	Shreya Ghoshal	Hindi film
2018	Parwaaz Hai Junoon	"Musafir"	Azaan Sami Khan	Shakeel Sohail	Zenab Fatimah Sultan	
2023	Tich Button	"Ehsaan Hai Tumhara"	Adrian David Emmanuel	Shakeel Sohail	Jonita Gandhi	
2025	Love Guru	"Toot Gaya"	Saad Sultan	Saad Sultan, Tahir Abbas	Yashal Shahid, Zain, Zohaib	

=== TV series songs ===
Year	Serial	Song	Music	Lyrics	Co-singer(s)	Note
2014	De Ijazat Jo Tu	"De Ijazat Jo Tu"	Sohail Haider			
2016	Teri Chah Mein	"Teri Chah Mein"	Sohail Haider	Samina Ejaz		
2017	Mere Ajnabi	"Mere Ajnabi"	Adrian David Emmanuel			
2018	Suno Chanda	"Suno Chanda"	Naveed Nashad	Aehsun Talish		
2018	Aangan	"Haari Haari"	Naveed Nashad	Imran Raza	Naveed Nashad	
2019	Suno Chanda 2	"Suno Chanda"	Naveed Nashad	Aehsun Talish	Damia Farooq, Rimsha Khan	
2020	Prem Gali	"Prem Gali"	Adrian David Emmanuel	Shakeel Sohail, Ahmad Farad	Nish Asher	
2023	Jhok Sarkar	"Meri Matti"	Adrian David Emmanuel	Sibtain Khalid		
2024	Aye Ishq e Junoon	"Yaara Ve"	Adrian David Emmanuel	Sami Khan		
2025	Shirin Farhad	"Sochon Se Jaati Nahi"	Hassan Rai, Qasim Dahir	Hassan Rai, Ali Moeen	Amna Rai	

=== Non-film songs ===
==== Jal albums ====
Year	Title	Note
2004	Aadat	as member of Jal
2007	Boondh	as member of Jal

==== Solo albums ====
Year	Title
2025	Khat

==== Singles ====
Year	Song	Album/Single	Notes
2011	"Khuwahishon"		Single
2011	"Ik Arzu"		Single
2012	"Pi Jaon"		co-singer Momina Mustehsan; Nominated – Lux Style Awards for Best Song of the Year
2013	"Tu Thori Dair" (Original Punjabi Version)	Compiled in 2020 album Dhanak Kay Rang by ISPR media productions	Single
2013	"Yeh Jo Halka Halka Suroor Hai"		
2014	"Roiyaan"		Lux Style Awards for Best Song of the Year, Hum Awards for Best Music Single
2015	"Sajna"		Single
2016	"Saathiya"		Single
2016	"Ji Jaun"		Single
2016	"Sajna Ve Sajna"	Udaari	co-singer Hadiqa Kiani
2016	"Jab Se Miley Tum"	Udaari	co-singer Maryam Fatima
2016	"Bol Ke Lab"	Udaari	co-singer Hadiqa Kiani
2016	"Koi Rokay Na Mujhe"		Nominated-Hum Award for Best Music Video
2017	"Dekh Tera Kya/Latthay Di Chaadar"	#CokeStudio10	
2018	"Dil Hua Panchi"		Single
2018	"Maula"		collaboration with Rishi Rich
2020	"Baliyay"	In The Box by Saad Sultan	Single
2021	"Pyaar Sufiyana" Ft. Hania Amir		For "Asim Jofa"
2021	"Na Cher Malangaan Nu"		co-singer Aima Baig
2022	"Khush Bichar Ker"	Kashmir Beats S2	
2022	"Naukar Shah Da"	Kashmir Beats S2	co-singer Shuja Haider
2022	"Kadi Kadi"		Single
2025	"Khwabeeda"		

=== Music video director ===
Year	Song	Singers	Company
2018	O Jaana	Rahat Fateh Ali Khan & Hamza Mallik	Zee Music

== Filmography ==
=== Films ===
Year	Title	Role	Notes	Ref.
2017	Punjab Nahi Jaungi	Himself	Special appearance in song "Rab Rakha"	
2022	Tich Button	Kaka Saab		
2026	Luv Di Saun	Zarshaan		

=== Television series ===
Year	Title	Role	Singer	Network	Director	Notes	Ref.
2014	Daay Ijazat Jo Tu	Sarmad	Yes	Hum TV	Fahim Burney	Also playback singer for title song	
2015	Mere Ajnabi	Mohid Shuja	Yes	ARY Digital	Ahmed Bhatti	Also playback singer for title song	
2016	Udaari	Taimoor Arshad "Arsh"	Yes	Hum TV	Mohammed Ehteshamuddin	Also playback singer for title song	
2016	Sila	Taimoor Ahsan	Yes	Hum TV	Syed Aabis Raza	Also playback singer for title song	
2016	Teri Chah Mein	Faisal Khan	Yes	ARY Digital	Syed Aabis Raza	Also playback singer for title song	
2018	Suno Chanda	Arsalan "Arsal" Jamshed Ali	Yes	Hum TV	Aehsun Talish	Also playback singer for title song	
2019	Suno Chanda 2	Arsalan "Arsal" Jamshed Ali	Yes	Hum TV	Aehsun Talish	Also playback singer for title song	
2020	Prem Gali	Hamza Hatim	Yes	ARY Digital	Qasim Ali Mureed	Also playback singer for title song	
2021	Mere Humsafar	Hamza Raees Ahmed		ARY Digital	Qasim Ali Mureed		
2022	Badshah Begum	Pir Shahzaib		Hum TV	Khizer Idrees		
2022	Meri Shehzadi	Dr. Hasan		Hum TV	Qasim Ali Mureed	Special appearance	
2023	Jhok Sarkar	Arsalan	Yes	Hum TV	Saife Hassan	Also playback singer for title song	
2024	Kaisi Hai Ye Ruswai	Baaris		Express TV	Wajahat Rauf		
2025	Shirin Farhad	Farhad	Yes	Hum TV	Asad Mumtaz Malik	Also playback singer for title song	
2026	Bas Tera Saath Ho	Anas Mujtaba	Yes	ARY Digital	Qasim Ali Mureed	Also playback singer for title song	

=== Telefilms ===
Year	Title	Role	Ref.
2017	Pyar Ki Love Story	Haadi	
2018	Iss Dil Ki Essi Ki Tessi	Azhar	
2021	Love Vaccine	Nadeem	

=== Web series ===
Year	Title	Role	Ref.
2025	Shamsher	Shamsher	

== Accolades ==
Year	Award	Category	Work	Result	Ref.
2013	Lux Style Awards	Best Song of the Year	"Pi Jaun"	Nominated	
2014	Hum Awards	Best Solo Artist	"Kyun Gae"	Nominated	
2015	Lux Style Awards	Best Song of the Year	"Roiyaan"	Won	
2015	Hum Awards	Best Music Single	"Roiyaan"	Won	
2017	Hum Awards	Best Supporting Actor	Udaari	Nominated	
2017	Hum Awards	Best Onscreen Couple (with Urwa Hocane)	Udaari	Won	
2017	Hum Awards	Best Onscreen Couple Popular (with Urwa Hocane)	Udaari	Nominated	
2017	Hum Awards	Best Music Single	"Koi Ruke Mujhay"	Nominated	
2017	International Pakistan Prestige Awards	Best Supporting Actor	Udaari	Nominated	
2017	International Pakistan Prestige Awards	Best Onscreen Couple (with Urwa Hocane)	Udaari	Won	
2018	Zee Cine Awards	Best Music Director	Half Girlfriend	Nominated	
2019	Lux Style Awards	Best Original Sound Track	Aangan	Nominated	
2019	Hum Awards	Best Actor	Suno Chanda	Nominated	
2019	Hum Awards	Best Onscreen Couple (with Iqra Aziz)	Suno Chanda	Won	
2019	Hum Awards	Best Actor Popular	Suno Chanda	Won	
2019	Hum Awards	Best Onscreen Couple Popular (with Iqra Aziz)	Suno Chanda	Won	
2019	International Pakistan Prestige Awards	Best Actor – Jury	Suno Chanda	Won	
2019	International Pakistan Prestige Awards	Best Actor – Viewer's choice	Suno Chanda	Nominated	
2019	International Pakistan Prestige Awards	Best Onscreen Couple (with Iqra Aziz)	Suno Chanda	Won	
2019	Pakistan International Screen Awards	Best Television Actor	Suno Chanda	Nominated	
2019	Pakistan International Screen Awards	Best Original Soundtrack	Suno Chanda	Nominated	
2021	ARY People's Choice Awards	Favourite Actor	Prem Gali	Nominated	
2021	ARY People's Choice Awards	Favourite Actor in a role of Damad	Prem Gali	Nominated	
2021	ARY People's Choice Awards	Favourite Jodi (with Sohai Ali Abro)	Prem Gali	Won	
2023	Lux Style Awards	Best TV Actor	Mere Humsafar	Nominated	
2023	Lux Style Awards	Best TV Actor – Critics' Choice	Mere Humsafar	Nominated	
2024	Hum Awards	Best Actor Popular	Badshah Begum	Nominated	
2024	Hum Awards	Best Actor Popular	Jhok Sarkar	Nominated	
2024	Hum Awards	Best Onscreen Couple Popular (with Hiba Bukhari)	Jhok Sarkar	Nominated	
2025	Lux Style Awards	Best TV Actor – Critics' Choice	Jhok Sarkar	Nominated	
