= Abdul Hameed Adam =

Pakistani writer and poet (1910–1981)

Abdul Hameed Adam عبد الحمید عدمؔ
- Born: Abdul Hameed; 10 April 1910; Talwandi Musa Khan, Gujranwala District, Punjab, British India (now in Pakistan)
- Died: 10 March 1981 (aged 70); Lahore
- Occupations: Urdu poet writer
- Writing career
- Period: 1910–1981
- Genres: Ghazal, Nazam
- Notable works: His poetry books: Ramm e Aahu, Barbat-o-Jam, Nadaniyan, Chaak Pairhan, Charah-e-Dard, Dastoor-e-Wafa
- Literary movement: Progressive Writers Movement

Abdul Hameed Adam (1910–1981) was a Pakistani writer and poet.

== Early life and education ==
Abdul Hameed was born in Talwandi Musa, a village in Gujranwala, Punjab, British India (now in Punjab, Pakistan).

He had completed his early education at home and completed his matriculation (10th grade) from Islamia High School, Bhati Gate, Lahore, Pakistan. After completing FA (12th grade) as a private student, Adam joined the British Indian Army in 1927–1928 and fought in the Second World War.

== Personal life and marriages ==
During the Second World War, he was sent to the Middle East, where he served in Iran and Iraq. In Iraq, he fell in love with an Iraqi girl, got married with her as his second wife, and brought her back with him to India after the end of the Second World War. On his return to India, he was posted to Pune (Poona, Maharashtra, India) where he became excessively involved with some friends and started drinking heavily. He would come home very late at night and then his disputes started with his Iraqi second wife. This second wife soon returned to Iraq and thereafter Adam remained loyal to his first local wife till she died in 1978/1979.

He was transferred to Rawalpindi after the establishment of Pakistan in 1947. In 1948, he was appointed Deputy Assistant Controller of Military Accounts and retired from this position in April 1966. By 1978/1979, Abdul Hameed Adam had become chronically ill. He died in 1981.

== Bibliography ==
- Kharabaat
- Jhoot-sach (1972)
- Ramm-e-Aahu
- Barbat-o-Jaam
- Nadaniyan
- Charah-e-Dard
- Chaak Pairhan
- Dastoor-e-Wafa
- Nisaab e Dil
- Daulat e Bedaar
