= Mere Humdam =

Pakistani television series

- Genre: Drama Serial
- Written by: Seema Munaf
- Directed by: Haseeb Ali
- Starring: Syed Jibran; Sarah Khan; Goher Mumtaz
- Country of origin: Pakistan
- Original language: Urdu
- No. of seasons: 1
- No. of episodes: 24

Production
- Producers: Momina Duraid; Duraid Siddiqui
- Camera setup: Multi-camera
- Running time: 40 minutes
- Production company: MD Productions

Original release
- Network: Hum TV
- Release: 26 January – 9 July 2019

Related
- Lamhay; Mein Na Janoo

Mere Humdam (Urdu: میرے ہمدم) is a Pakistani drama serial which first aired on Hum TV on 26 January 2019. It was created by Momina Duraid and produced by their production company MD Productions. The show stars Syed Jibran, Sarah Khan, and Goher Mumtaz. The show ended on 9 July 2019.

== Cast ==
- Syed Jibran as Usama
- Goher Mumtaz as Haris
- Sarah Khan as Warda
- Mashal Khan as Paras
- Natalia Awais as Aiman
- Nida Mumtaz as Warda's mother
- Humaira Bano as Usama's mother
- Fazila Qazi as Haris's mother
- Khalid Bin Shaheen as Zaidi (Haris's father)
- Jahanara Hai as Zaidi's mother (Haris's grandmother)

== Soundtrack ==
Mere Humdam - OST

Soundtrack album by Gohar Mumtaz & Amna Abbas
- Released: 31 January 2019
- Recorded: 2019
- Genre: Television soundtrack
- Length: (1:32)
- Language: Urdu
- Label: Hum TV

Music video
- "Mere Humdam" OST on YouTube

The title song was sung by Gohar Mumtaz and Amna Abbas. Mumtaz also composed the music and wrote the lyrics.
