= Bedil Masroor =

Sindhi TV producer and a popular writer and singer

- بيدل مسرور بدوي
- Born: 11 July 1947 (age 78); Shikarpur, Sindh, Pakistan
- Occupations: Television producer, television director, writer, poet, musician, lyricist, and record producer
- Years active: 1974–present
- Television: Dil Ji Duniya; Hathen Gul Mendi; Mohabatoon Ke Safeer; Roshan Tara
- Spouse: Beena Masroor
- Children: 7
- Parent: Faqeer Ghulam Ali Masroor
- Awards: Shaikh Ayaz Award

Bedil Masroor (Sindhi: بيدل مسرور بدوي; born 11 July 1947) is a PTV producer and a writer and singer of Sindhi poetry.

== Personal life and education ==
=== Early life ===
His father, Faqeer Ghulam Ali Masroor, was a Sufi poet who used to sing his own ‘kalam’. Masroor inherited this tradition from his father and began to write his own poetry.

=== Education ===
Masroor was born at Shikarpur and attended primary school Kasai Muhalla, Shikarpur and Government High School Shikarpur. He graduated from the University of Sindh.

=== Kidnapping of son ===
On 18 July 2023, his son Hans Masroor, 43, was kidnapped by people wearing police-like uniforms on Shahrah-e-Faisal outside his Trading Corporation of Pakistan (TCP) office in the FTC building.

==== Background ====
According to Bedil Masroor, his son left his office at 8:45pm in his car. Unknown people travelling in a white Vigo stopped him at Shahrah-e-Faisal and kidnapped him. Later, Bedil, filed a FIR at Saddar Police Station, Karachi.

==== Investigation ====
CCTV footages obtained by the police showed Hans getting out of the FTC building and his car being escorted by the white Vigo.

==== Aftermath ====
Sindhi Adabi Sangat, an organization of the writers of Sindhi language, demanded the immediate release of Hans Masroor.

== Career ==
He joined PTV as a producer in 1974. He produced many prominent Sindhi and Urdu Dramas, these included Hathen Gul Mendi, Dil Ji Duniya, Mohabatoon Ke Safeer. He had also presented programmes in Brahvi language when he was posted in PTV Quetta station.

== Awards ==
He was awarded the "Shaikh Ayaz Award" by Shah Abdul Latif University

== Bibliography ==
- Ranwal Ramzun Waro
- chahtin jay tiwatay tay
- Kaliyat-e-Masroor
- Shaheed-e-Haq Mansoor Hallaj
