= De Ijazat Jo Tu =

- Genre: Drama; Romance
- Written by: Seema Ghazal
- Directed by: Fahim Burney
- Starring: Farhan Saeed; Sohai Ali Abro; Javed Sheikh; Saba Hameed
- Opening theme: "De Ijazat Jo Tu, Tere Pehlu main rehlun mein"
- Country of origin: Pakistan
- Original language: Urdu
- No. of episodes: 20

Production
- Running time: 45 minutes

Original release
- Network: Hum TV
- Release: 13 October – 18 December 2014

De Ijazat Jo Tu (Urdu: دے اجازت جو تو, lit. 'If You Permit Me') is a Pakistani romantic drama serial that was first aired on 13 October 2014. It had 20 episodes. It was last aired on 18 December 2014.

== Summary ==
De Ijazat Jo Tu story revolves around the love story of Sarmad (Farhan Saeed) and Ayla (Sohai Ali Abro). While Ayla comes from a middle-class background with a doting family, Sarmad comes from a rich background but is distant from his father due to his father's busy schedule. His stepmother doesn't care about him nor does his stepbrother.

Ayla's entry into Sarmad's life is a blessing for him and he feels his loneliness disappearing. Sarmad and Ayla get married, much to the dismay of his stepmother and are forced to move into their own home due to her disapproval (despite having support from her family and his father).

At present, Ayla and Sarmad have a baby girl, but Sarmad's father (Javed Sheikh) has gone missing after boarding a flight and is assumed to be dead. The show takes an 8-year leap. On Ayla's birthday, Sarmad forgets a new gift for his wife in the market. Sarmad, by the permission of his mother (Saba Hameed) and his wife leaves to retrieve it. After returning, his car was collided by a car. He survived in Hospital but after talking to his wife, he took his last breath and suddenly died. His death suddenly shocked his family. Even the family haven't enjoyed any joy after his death in their life.

== Cast ==
Farhan Saeed

- Farhan Saeed as Sarmad (Protagonist)
- Sohai Ali Abro as Aiyla (Protagonist)
- Yasir Ali Khan as Faizi
- Humaira Bano as Faizi's Mother
- Inayat Khan as Ahsan, Sarmad's Friend
- Mehjabeen
- Hina Aman
- Zeeshan
- Tariq Jameel as Ayla's Father
- Atif Rathore as Tahir
- Javed Sheikh as Sarmad's Father
- Saba Hameed as Sarmad's Mother (Antagonist)
- Azfar Rehman as Bunty
