= Goher Mumtaz =

Goher Mumtaz گوہر ممتاز
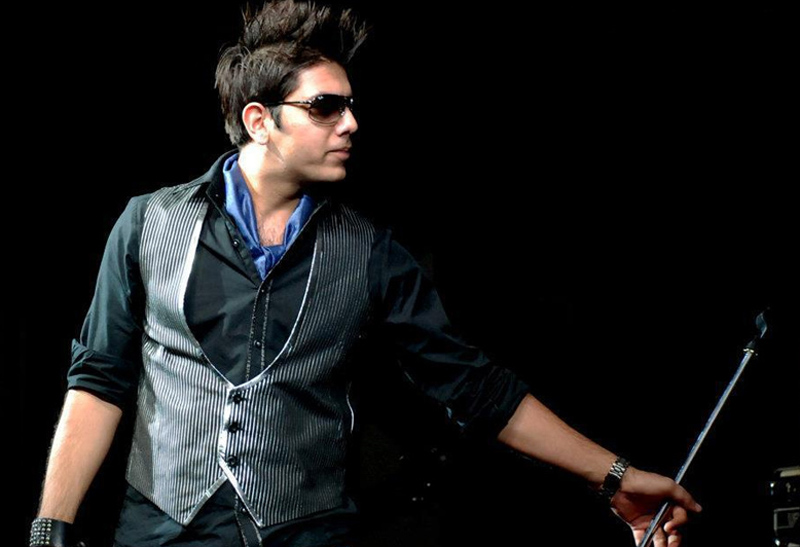

Background information
- Born: 27 July 1981 (age 45); Lahore, Punjab, Pakistan
- Genres: Pop; rock; Sufi rock
- Occupations: Musician; singer-songwriter; music composer; guitarist; lyricist; actor
- Instruments: Vocals; guitar
- Years active: 2002–present
- Labels: Sadaf Stereo; Fire Records; Universal Music India

Goher Mumtaz (Urdu: گوہر ممتاز) is a Pakistani musician, singer-songwriter, music composer, guitarist and actor. He is famous for being one of the founding members of the rock band Jal.

== Personal life ==
Since 2016, he is married to Anum Ahmed, who made her acting debut with him in the 2016 Hum TV drama Kathputli, and who is interested in filmmaking as well.

== Formation of Jal ==
Goher and Atif Aslam were college fellows and used to sing in college concerts. They thought of forming a band and released their first song "Aadat" on the Internet. The song was written and composed by Goher and sung by Atif. By the time the song was released it became a major hit in the subcontinent and many radio and TV stations started playing it.

After the major hit, "Aadat", Goher and Atif started getting concert queries, they then decided to give a proper name to their band, so they named it Jal (water in Sanskrit) and performed in various concerts with Atif on vocals and Goher on guitars.

Later on Atif, left the band because of some differences and he pursued his solo career, while Goher formed the new line-up and brought Farhan Saeed on vocals and Amir Sheraz (Shazi) on bass. With this new line-up, Jal released their first studio album Aadat in 2003. The album was a major hit in both Pakistan and India and won various awards. With the same line-up, Jal released Boondh in 2007, and again it was a major hit and the band won many awards. They performed in numerous concerts with the same line-up. Jal also performed two songs in Coke Studio (Pakistan) in season 4.

In 2011, Farhan Saeed left the band because of some personal differences. Therefore, Goher took the position of lead vocalist and brought Saad Sultan on lead guitar.

Jal released album, Pyass worldwide in 2013 and performed in many concerts with this line-up. The album was nominated as best album of the year in Hum Awards and Lux Style Awards.

== Brand ambassador of Gibson Guitar ==
Goher Mumtaz became the first brand ambassador of Gibson Guitar Corporation in the subcontinent.

== Big screen debut ==
Goher Mumtaz appeared as a guest actor in Pakistani film Lahore Se Aagey along with Ali Zafar. The main cast of film includes Saba Qamar and Yasir Hussain.

== Discography ==
=== Albums ===
Year	Title	Label
2004	Aadat	Sadaf Stereo
2007	Boondh	Fire Records
2013	Pyaas	M Records, Universal Music
TBA	Baarish	Jal's YouTube Music & Spotify

=== Singles ===
Year	Title	Detail(s)
2008	Sajni (Reprise)	Lux Style Awards
2010	Uraan	Worldcup Song
2011	Dam Hai Toh Samnay	International Boxing Championship
2012	Ik Aarzu – Unplugged	Single (not included in Album Pyaas)
2015	Tu Qadam Berhaye Ja	Pakistan Armed Forces
2015	Teray Baajon	Single
2015	Ooncha	Pakistan Defence Day Song
2015	3 Albums Medley	JAL's 1st Official Medley (Songs: Chup Chup, Kash Yeh Pal, Woh Lamhay, Mahia)
2017	Parinda	Single
2018	Pakistan Hai Wo	Pakistan Independence Day Song
2020	Bhanwaray	Single
2020	Bhanwaray (Rendition)	Bhanwaray (Rendition) ft. DJ Santronix
2022	Rooh-e-Jal	Soul Mix Mashup
2023	Parinda - Live Version	From Upcoming Album Baarish
2023	Beh Gaya	From Upcoming Album Baarish

=== Coke Studio Pakistan ===
Year	Title	Co-singer
2011	"Ik Aarzu"	
2011	"Panchi (Reprise)"	QuratulAin Balouch

=== Pakistani drama soundtracks ===
Year	Song	Drama Serial	TV Channel
2013	"Tanhai"	Tanhai	Hum TV
2014	"Laiyan Laiyan (Cover)"	Uff Yeh Muhabbat	Geo TV
2014	"Dil Jhoomay"	Uff Yeh Muhabbat	Geo TV
2014	"Pyar Hai"	Uff Yeh Muhabbat	Geo TV
2014	"Rona Nahi"	Uff Yeh Muhabbat	Geo TV
2015	"Khel Sajna"	Neelum Kinaray	Hum Sitaray
2017	"Sun Saiyaan Tere Ishq Diyan Khairan Mangiyaan"	Qurban	ARY Digital
2017	"Faisla"	Faisla	ARY Digital
2023	"Aasman Pe Likhi Hai Dua"	Dagh e Dil	Hum TV

== Filmography ==
Key
†	Denotes film / drama that has not released yet
†	Denotes films / drama that are currently on cinema / on air

=== Film ===
Year	Title	Role	Notes	Ref.
2016	Lahore Se Aagey	Judge	Guest appearance	
2024	Abhi	Hamza Ahmed	Debut as lead role	

=== Television ===
Year	Title	Role	Channel	Notes	Ref,
2011	Kountry Luv		A-Plus TV	Acting debut	
2013	Tanhai	Faiz	Hum TV		
2013	Kahin Chand Na Sharma Jaye		Hum TV	Teleflim	
2014	Uff Yeh Mohabbat	Sameer	Geo Entertainment		
2014	Bhanwar		Hum Sitaray		
2016	Ghayal	Adil	ARY Digital		
2016	Kathputli	Sheraz	Hum TV		
2017	Neelam Kinaray	Ijaz	Hum TV		
2017	Faisla	Asad	ARY Digital	Lead role	
2017	Baaghi	Pakistan Idol Judge	Urdu 1	Cameo	
2018	Ishq Mein Kaafir	Fahad	A-Plus TV	Lead role	
2019	Mere Humdam	Haris	Hum TV		
2023	Dagh e Dil	Ibad	Hum TV		

== See also ==
- Jal
- Farhan Saeed
- Atif Aslam
