= Aadat (album) =

2004 studio album by Jal

Studio album by Jal
- Released: 27 September 2004, 2024 (Remastered)
- Recorded: 2003–2004, 2024
- Studio: Xth Harmonic Studios, Lahore, Pakistan; Digital Fidelity Studios, Lahore, Pakistan
- Genre: Rock; Pop rock
- Length: 53:44
- Label: HOM Records
- Producer: Zulfiqar Jabbar Khan; Mekaal Hasan

Jal chronology
Aadat (2004)	Boondh (2007)

Aadat is a 2004 studio album by the Pakistani band Jal.

The album features three bonus tracks (Dr. Zeus & Kais Mix) and has an exclusive bonus VCD with all Jal videos.

== Copyright dispute ==
Atif Aslam released his debut solo album Jal Pari after he left the band, which included some songs from Aadat: "Lamhey" (titled as "Bheegi Yaadein" on Jal Pari), "Dil Haarey" (titled as "Ankhon Se" on Jal Pari) and "Rangon Mein" (titled as "Zindagi" on Jal Pari). This led to a dispute between Aslam and Jal about who owned the rights to the songs, as Mumtaz took the dispute to court. However, the final statement from the court went somewhat in favour of both the artists as the songs which were included in both the artist albums were compositions of both Aslam and Mumtaz. However, Aslam was prohibited from using Jal's name and performing the disputed songs. Aslam went on to sing the same songs in India, in fact copying the exact tune of "Woh Lamhey" for the Indian movie Zeher. Later, in a statement Jal the band pardoned Aslam, which finally ended the dispute between the musicians.

== Track listing ==
All tracks are written by Goher Mumtaz.

Aadat
No.	Title	Length
1.	"Rangon Mein"	4:35
2.	"Lamhey"	5:25
3.	"Ik Din Ayega"	4:18
4.	"Panchi"	3:49
5.	"Bikhra Hoon Main"	8:03
6.	"Dil Haarey"	4:48
7.	"Teri Yaad"	6:20
8.	"Aadat"	4:29
9.	"Manchala"	3:49
10.	"Har Jaga Hai Jal"	2:53
11.	"Lamhey" (Dr. Zeus Hip Hop Mix)	5:25
12.	"Aadat" (Hip Hop Mix)	3:47
13.	"Sun Sarkaar (Bonus Track)" (Released in 2024, listed as Track 11 in Aadat Remastered)	2:40

== Personnel ==
All information is taken from the CD.

Farhan Saeed

Jal

- Farhan Saeed – lead vocals
- Goher Mumtaz – lead guitar, vocal
- Aamir Sheraz – bass guitar

Production

- Produced by Zulfiqar Jabbar Khan and Mekaal Hasan
- Recorded and mixed at Xth Harmonic Studio, Lahore, Punjab
- Guitar sound engineer – Goher Mumtaz
- Assisted by Zulfiqar J. Khan
