= DJ Suketu =

- Born: Suketu Radia
- Genres: Remix; Bollywood; house; dance
- Occupations: DJ; record producer

Suketu Radia, also known as DJ Suketu (born 19 November 1981) is an Indian DJ, music producer and content creator. Since the release of his critically acclaimed tracks - 'Bin Tere Sanam', 'Pyaar Zindagi' and 'Woh Lamhe', DJ Suketu has been widely acclaimed as the No.1 Bollywood music DJ in India. In 2002, he released Bin Tere Sanam, which hit No.1 on the India pop charts.

Raised in Mumbai, DJ Suketu is widely known for the most popular remixes of all time. His skills were honed by 4 times UK Champion and 2 times World Champion DJ Cut Master Swift at the DMC headquarters in Burnham and he went on to win the DMC in 1999.

He is the only Indian producer to have collaborated on mixes with Flo Rida, Iyaz and Sean Kingston

== Bollywood ==
He was recently seen on top-rated Indian television show Jhalak Dikhhla Jaa with jury member like Remo D'Souza, Karan Johar and Madhuri Dixit on Colors, where he mixed live music for the contestant. Recently he also created a sample pack on the world known Bandlab website.

== Bin Tere Sanam ==
Bin Tere Sanam was released on his debut album “440 Volts” in 2003 or 2004. It became a hit, charting No.1 on the India Pop Charts, staying there for 20 weeks. It would then go on to win Best Remix of the Year by MTV India.

== Bandlab ==
On October 4, 2022, DJ Suketu published a Bandlab sample pack. Loads of Bandlab users used the sample pack which included DJ Comics©, BGIS and more.
