= Coke Studio Pakistan season 11 =

Coke Studio Pakistan
- Season 11
- Official poster
- Starring: Featured Artists
- No. of episodes: 9

Release
- Original network: YouTube
- Original release: August 10 – October 19, 2018

Season chronology
- ← Previous; Season 10 Next → Season 12

The eleventh season of Pakistani music television series Coke Studio Pakistan, titled as Coke Studio: The Sound of Nation, premiered in Pakistan on 10 August 2018. Musicians Ali Hamza and Zohaib Kazi were announced as a new producers and directors for the series, after Strings stepped down from the role to pursue their own music. The series was produced under Kazi and Hamza's production company Front Foot Media and was distributed by The Coca-Cola Company Pakistan.

As a part of new module, Kazi and Hamza created a spin-off series Coke Studio Explorer which was released on 3 July 2018 and featured regional but largely unknown artists across the country where their performances were recorded live. The series opened to rave reviews and received critical acclaim. Despite the success of Explorer series, season eleven, received mixed reception from the critics.

The ninth and last episode was released on 19 October 2018. The season consisted of 30 tracks plus one promo song.

== Artists ==
=== Featured artists ===
The following is a list of thirty-nine artists (seventy individuals) including eight bands, five duos and twenty-six solo artists.

- Abida Parveen
- Abrar-ul-Haq
- Ahad Raza Mir
- Aima Baig
- Ali Azmat
- Ali Sethi
- Asim Azhar
- Asrar
- Attaullah Khan Esakhelvi
- Chand Tara Orchestra
- Darehan, Mangal & Shayan
- Elizabeth Rai
- Ghulam Ali Qadri
- Gul Panra
- Hasan Jahangir
- Haniya Aslam
- Humaira Arshad
- Jawad Ahmad
- Jimmy Khan
- Khumariyaan
- Krewella
- Lucky & Naghma
- Lyari Underground
- Mishal Khawaja
- Momina Mustehsan
- Mughal-e-Funk
- Natasha Baig
- Riaz Qadri
- Rachel Viccaji
- Sanwal Esakhelvi
- Sahir Ali Bagga
- Shamu Bai
- Shuja Haider
- Sounds of Kolachi
- The Sketches
- Vishnu & Shamu Bai
- Young Desi
- Zarsanga

=== Musicians ===
The following are the musicians for the season:

House band
- Babar Ali Khanna – Tabla and dholak
- Kamran "Mannu" Zafar – Bass
- Omran Shafique – Guitars
- Kami Paul – Drums
- Rufus Shahzad – Keyboard

Guest musicians
- Baqir Abbas – Flute
- Gul Muhammad – Sarangi
- Haniya Aslam – Multi-instrumentalist
- Jhoolay Lal Lewa Group – Percussion
- Manzoor Ahmed and Saeed Ahmed – Violin
- Rakae Jamil – Sitar
- Tanveer Hussain and Hyder Hussain – Banjitar and Guitars
- Nadeem Iqbal – Harmonium

Backing vocalists
- Shahab Hussain
- Wajiha Naqvi
- Mehr Qadir

== Production ==
=== Development ===
After producing four seasons, Bilal Maqsood and Faisal Kapadia of Strings left the show to continue their own music, and Coke Studio Season 10 was the last season prodeced by them. After Strings departure, it was earlier reported that Noori will take charge as a new producers, however their publicist denied such reports.

In March 2018, Coca-Cola Pakistan announced Ali Hamza and Zohaib Kazi would helm the production and direction of eleventh season. Coca-Cola officially released a statement saying that "both Coke Studio veterans" have played "an instrumental role in its success over the years. We cannot wait to share their brilliance with all of you" in the "new chapter of the Coke Studio" journey. Fahad Qadir who is a director of public Affairs and communications of Coca-Cola, revealed on approaching Kazi and Hamza saying, "I think it was a natural evolution. Rohail Hyatt came to a point where he thought change was good" and "he brought Coke Studio where it is today. Strings had a different sound and brought in a different bag of producers. […] These are the producers we feel have the right blend, the experience, the history with Coke Studio the understanding of Coke Studio to take it to the next level."

In July 2018, Arab News revealed that Hamza and Kazi had first met in August 2017 in Lahore, two months before they were approached for the show. Kazi recounts, "that was the first time we connected on a personal level", while Hamza told, "We sat down to talk very specifically about this opportunity", and within minutes "I truly felt I had known Zohaib for a long time." They told Dawn Images in an interview that before they "started speaking to Coca-Cola", they "talked generally, about life and people and Pakistan". They had long discussions about the responsibility that Coke Studio had to be spread across the country to attract both; urban and rural areas; as "the regions and its people collectively make Pakistan."

The series went into production in April 2018 and finished filming the following month at Karachi. Post-production took place in June and July at Front Food Media in Lahore.

=== Coke Studio Explorer ===
As a part of a new module, a spin-off series Coke Studio Explorer was created before the launch of season, on a concept similar to Kazi's previous work on his album Fanoos that featured relatively unknown artists across the country where recordings were done live and edited later. In an interview to Daily Times by the duo, Kazi explained, "in Fanoos, we limited ourselves to recording musicians on location. We do much more in Coke Studio Explorer by highlighting the culture, stories and ethos behind the music. After presenting the musicians in their home locations, we bring them to our studios" to record in traditional Coke Studio style too. Hamza said, "we established the criteria for selection before embarking on our search for musicians", they "had to be talented" and had "to represent a unique aspect of the culture, history and spirit of Pakistan." The duo developed a special mobile recording system for the on-location recordings and while additional tracks and engineering was completed in studio.

The duo travelled in all four provinces and Kashmir to find artists that were known in their native regions but were unknown to mainstream media. The duo discovered a sixteen-year old pair of Amrina and Ariana from Kalash, Chitral, the brother-sister duo of Vishnu and Shamu Bai from Deewan Lal Chand a village in interior Sindh, while from Sohbatpur District, Balochistan they found throat-singers Mangal, Darehan and Shayan (now known as Bloach Throat singers), a fusion band Qasamir led by Altaf Mir with Ghulam Mohammad Daar, Manzoor Ahmed Khan, Saifuddin Shahfrom from Muzaffarabad, Azad Kashmir, and the fifth and final collaboration was with Mishal Khawaja a Pakistani born-Canadian singer, who was discovered through her Instagram covers.

The Explorer series has received largely positive reviews from critics, with particular praise given to its new module, diversity, performances and Coke Studio efforts in showcasing and bringing the indigenous art form of Pakistan to the mainstream media.

=== Debutants and comebacks ===
Among thirty-nine artists, fifteen musicians debut with season eleven including seven bands, five duos, and three solo artists. Actor and singer Ahad Raza Mir, Lahore-based rapper Young Desi; singer Elizabeth Rai (who is particularly known for her song in the film Teri Meri Love Story) and Illinois-based duo Jahan and Yasmine Yousaf of Krewella made their debuts. Four of five artists from Coke Studio Explorer series appeared in the season, while singers Riaz Qadri and Ghulam Qadri along with hip-hop band L.U.G (Lyari UnderGround), who previously worked with Kazi on his album Fanoos, also made their debuts.

For the first time in the history of Coke Studio, two transgender singers, Naghma and Lucky were included as featured artists. Their appearance received overwhelming response from media critics and people. Several featured artists returned from previous seasons as well, including Humera Arshad who was on hiatus before appearing in the tenth season. Arshad remarked, "this will be the beginning of a new phase for me in my singing career."

== Release ==
First episode was screened in a special event at Pearl-Continental Hotel in Lahore, attended by Coke Studio team, artists and notable personalities including Allama Iqbal's family. During the release the marketing director Abbas Arslan revealed the show features "12 languages, 35 instruments with 70 artists who've composed more than 40 songs." Stating further he said, "Ali and Zohaib travelled 5500 kilometers" to discover "Explorer artists" that were included in the season. Sharing on how they wanted to be season-eleven Kazi said, "music is a powerful tool to spread a message so this is ours to the world. From Hunza to Karachi we have many gems and we must find pride in them all". After the Friday release of webisode, these were broadcast on Saturday on radio stations and television channels of Pakistan.

=== Promo song ===
Preceding the release of season, as a part of a traditional format, Coke Studio revealed this year featured artists performing a rendition of popular nazm, "Hum Dekhenge" by poet Faiz Ahmed Faiz, originally recorded by Iqbal Bano. The promo song also manifests the nation's political situation in the midst of general elections. On continuing the tradition of title song, Kazi and Hamza said that this season's journey of began with Coke Studio Explorer, "we couldn't be more confident about the power of human stories coming together to form a bigger picture", so "there couldn't be a better choice for a track than: "Hum Dekhenge" – A song by sung the people of Pakistan, for the people of Pakistan!" The song was well received by critics and public.

=== Episodes ===
No. overall	Title	Artists(s)	Composer(s)	Lyricist(s)	Language(s)	Original release date
Season Opener
-	"Hum Dekhenge"	Season's Vocalists	Asrar	Faiz Ahmad Faiz	Urdu	July 22, 2018
Episode 1: Naaz
59	"Shikwa / Jawab-e-Shikwa"	Natasha Baig, Fareed Ayaz, Abu Muhammad Qawwal & Brothers	Munshi Raziuddin	Allama Iqbal, Amjad Hyderabadi & Omar Khayyam	Farsi & Urdu	August 10, 2018
59	"Baalkada"	Lucky, Naghma & Jimmy Khan	Lucky, Naghma & Jimmy Khan	Lucky, Naghma & Jimmy Khan	Punjabi	August 10, 2018
59	"Rap Hai Saara"	Young Desi & Lyari Underground	Mufassir Sabir, Abdul Wahab Khan, Abdul Ahad & Abdullah	Mufassir Sabir, Abdul Wahab Khan, Abdul Ahad & Abdullah	Balochi, English & Urdu	August 10, 2018
59	"Main Irada"	Haniya Aslam, Rachel Viccaji, Shamu Bai, Ariana & Amrina	Haniya Aslam	Bilal Sami, Haniya Aslam, Kabir & Traditional Folk	Hindavi, Kailasha & Urdu	August 10, 2018
Episode 2: Zeenat
60	"Runaway"	Krewella, Riaz Qadri & Ghulam Ali Qadri	Riaz Qadri	Ed, Logan, Cody Tarpley, Jahan Yousaf and Yasmine Yousaf, Dan Henig, Ghulam Fareed & Khwaja Mohammad Yaar	English & Punjabi	August 17, 2018
60	"Gaddiye"	Asrar & Attaullah Khan Esakhelvi	Attaullah Khan Esakhelvi, Asrar & Ustad Sultan Ahmed	Asrar & Sohna Khan Bewas	Punjabi & Saraiki	August 17, 2018
60	"Rasha Mama"	Zarsanga, Khumariyaan & Gul Panrra	Ustaad Gulzaman	Traditional Folk	Pashto	August 17, 2018
60	"Ghoom Charakhra"	Abida Parveen & Ali Azmat	Abida Parveen & Ali Azmat	Hazrat Hussain Shah	Punjabi & Saraiki	August 17, 2018
Episode 3: Rung
61	"Roye Roye"	Momina Mustehsan & Sahir Ali Bagga	Sahir Ali Bagga	Sahir Ali Bagga & Shakil Sohail	Punjabi	August 24, 2018
61	"Allah Karesi"	Attaullah Khan Esakhelvi & Sanwal Esakhelvi	Attaullah Khan Esakhelvi & Sanwal Esakhelvi	Majboor Esakhelvi	Saraiki	August 24, 2018
61	"Piya Ghar Aaya"	Fareed Ayaz, Abu Muhammad Qawwal & Brothers	Fareed Ayaz & Abu Muhammad Qawwal	Bulleh Shah	Farsi, Punjabi & Urdu	August 24, 2018
Episode 4: Gulistan
62	"Aatish"	Aima Baig & Shuja Haider	Shuja Haider	Shuja Haider	Punjabi & Urdu	August 31, 2018
62	"Nami Danam"	Chand Tara Orchestra	Shaheryar Tariq, Omran Shafique, Babar Sheikh & Rizwanullah Khan	Khwaja Usman Harooni	Farsi	August 31, 2018
62	"Mahi Aaja"	Asim Azhar & Momina Mustehsan	Asim Azhar & Qasim Azhar	Asim Azhar	English, Punjabi & Urdu	August 31, 2018
Episode 5: Mauj
63	"Malang"	Aima Baig & Sahir Ali Bagga	Sahir Ali Bagga	Imran Raza & Traditional Folk	Punjabi & Saraiki	September 7, 2018
63	"Dastaan-e-Moomal Rano"	The Sketches	Ashfaque Ahmed & Saif Samejo	Shah Abdul Latif Bhittai	Sindhi	September 7, 2018
63	"Dil Hai Pakistani"	Ali Azmat, Mangal, Darehan & Shayan	Ali Azmat, Mangal, Darehan & Shayan	Mangal & Sabir Zafar	Balochi & Urdu	September 7, 2018
Episode 6: Zamana
64	"Ilallah"	Sounds of Kolachi	Ahsan Bari	Ahsan Bari	Purbi & Urdu	September 28, 2018
64	"Hawa Hawa"	Gul Panrra & Hasan Jahangir	Mehboob Ashraf	Muhammad Nasir	Urdu	September 28, 2018
64	"Tere Liye"	Ali Azmat, Riaz Qadri & Ghulam Ali Qadri	Ali Azmat & Riaz Qadri	Khwaja Ghulam Fareed & Sabir Zafar	Saraiki & Urdu	September 28, 2018
Episode 7: Sahil
65	"Jind Mahiya"	Shuja Haider	Shuja Haider	Shuja Haider	Punjabi, Sindhi & Urdu	October 5, 2018
65	"Ballay Ballay"	Abrar-ul-Haq & Aima Baig	Abrar-ul-Haq	Abrar-ul-Haq & Traditional Folk	Punjabi	October 5, 2018
65	"Ya Qurban"	Khumariyaan	Khumariyaan	Traditional Folk	Pashto	October 5, 2018
65	"Balaghal Ula Be Kamalihi"	Abida Parveen	Abida Parveen	Hazrat Bedam Shah Warsi	Arabic, Farsi & Urdu	October 5, 2018
Episode 8: Jashan
66	"Wah Jo Kalaam"	Asrar, Vishnu & Shamu Bai	Ustad Sultan Ahmed	Asrar	Sindhi	October 12, 2018
66	"Luddi Hai Jamalo"	Ali Sethi & Humaira Arshad	Wajahat Attre	Fazal Abbas & Khawaja Pervaiz	Punjabi	October 12, 2018
66	"Apna Gham"	Bilal Khan & Mishal Khawaja	Bilal Khan	Bilal Khan	Urdu	October 12, 2018
Episode 9: Aftab
67	"Dildar Sadqay"	Elizabeth Rai & Jawad Ahmad	Jawad Ahmad	Ahmad Anis, Asim Raza & Jawad Ahmad	Punjabi	October 19, 2018
67	"Aurangzeb"	Mughal-e-Funk	Kami Paul, Farhan Ali, Rakae Jamil & Rufus Shahzad	Instrumental	Instrumental	October 19, 2018
67	"Ko Ko Korina"	Ahad Raza Mir & Momina Mustehsan	Sohail Rana	Masroor Anwar	Urdu	October 19, 2018

== Critical reviews ==
Television critic Shaheer Anwar of The Express Tribune said, "the duo promised to bring a new flavour to the traditional Coke Studio and seem to have accomplished their goal so far by introducing Coke Studio Explorer. This is what many are calling a bonus to the upcoming season that aims to discover musical talent from all across Pakistan." Actor turned musician Arshad Mehmud said, "the new season of Coke Studio comes with a message of love, unity, passion and pride that is exceedingly relevant to the current times. It should be heard, savoured and celebrated." Forbes contributor journalist, Sonya Rehman from Lahore remarked, "Coke Studio's previous seasons have dealt with its fair share of criticism and mixed reactions over certain song selections and collaborations, gauging by Coke Studio Explorer, it may just hit all the right notes this year." The season has been praised for its diversity and inclusion of new artists, Ali Samoo wrote, "this season seems to have made a very strong effort to cast an all-inclusive and representative musical spirit, painting a vibrant picture of Pakistan for the world to see. It is perhaps to show us how togetherness is what makes us beautiful, to prevent a divide and to convey solidarity amongst the nationals. The culturally pluralist amalgamation was perhaps made also to make the election time a bit more peaceful." However, season eleven received mixed reception from critics and public, criticizing the quality of music as compared to previous seasons. Imane Babar Wahedi of The Express Tribune was more critical of the show saying, "the producers focus on delivering decent performances, rather than trying too hard to be innovative," she further said, "their efforts have been praiseworthy in terms of bringing diversity to Coke Studio, but on a separate note, they shouldn't be neglecting the quality of their music."

The first episode received mixed reception from critics and publications; it was praised for its diversity both in music and casting, but it was critically reviewed for its quality of music. Writing for The Express Tribune, Ramsha Vistro remarked, "the episode managed to display an array of formations and stood for change featuring transgenders and an all-female band. I think it's safe to say, Coke Studio's latest offering did not fail to make a mark." The songs "Main Irada" and "Shika/Jawab-e-Shikwa" received critical acclaim. Second episode contained a mix of traditional and modern rendition of songs receiving mixed reception from the critics. Rahul Aijaz of The Express Tribune quipped, "Hamza and Kazi are surely bringing a change to Coke Studio. They get full points for innovation. But overall, the sound isn't mature enough yet. I can't decide whether it's because the producers are trying too hard or because they are more concerned about implementing their ideology, even if that compromises on the music." Episode three garnered positive reception, with particular praise was given to Fareed Ayaz and Abu Muhammad performance of "Piya Ghar Aya", while Express Tribune concluded the episode with moderate reception saying, "after what was a generally disappointing start to the season, Coke Studio is somewhat back on track with episode three. The Esakhelvi duo brought something fresh, Fareed Ayaz, Abu Muhammad Qawwal and Brothers gave us a taste of what we originally loved about the show, and Bagga topped it all off with a melody nostalgic of an era long gone. The song "Roye Roye" achieved mixed reception among the third episode, some praising the song as "nostalgic revival of old school melodies", and some complained it for its "clichéd lyrics", Maheen Sabeeh of The News International bemoaned "a song that's a bit too long and in the end sounds like a pop ditty gone awry with equally tedious lyrics and every instrument thrown on the board, for example, a weeping flute. It's a bit like suffering to listen to this suffering ballad of a song." Episode four also drew mixed reception, however, Chand Tara Orchestra's performance received critical acclaim, while the other two songs "Aatish" and "Mahi Aaja" received moderate reception.
