= 17th Lux Style Awards =

Ceremony held in Expo Center in Lahore, Pakistan

- Date: 21 February 2018
- Venue: Lahore International Expo Centre
- Country: Pakistan
- Hosted by: Ahmed Ali Butt and Vasay Chaudhry

Television/radio coverage
- Network: Hum TV
- Directed by: Vaneeza Ahmad

The 17th Lux Style Awards was a Lux Style Awards ceremony held in Expo Center in Lahore, Pakistan. It was the first Lux Style Awards ceremony broadcast by Hum TV. The award show not only recognized and acknowledged excellence in Fashion, Film, Music and Pakistani television in 2017 but also created consciousness about various social causes, such as sexual abuse, child abuse and human rights. Unilever Pakistan Marketing Director Raheel Pasha also issued a statement earlier saying that 17th Lux Style Awards show was going to bring focus on ‘social awakening’ and ‘stand in solidarity with the nation’ at this ‘critical time’. The event started off with celebrities and prominent personalities walking down the red carpet. Ali Kazmi, the official Red Carpet host engaged the stars in quick and light hearted conversations after visiting the Social Corner, which was hosted by Ayesha Omer. Punjab Nahi Jaungi remained most awards winning film with four awards while Baaghi remained most awards winning TV series by winning three awards.

The Awards show was directed By Vaneeza Ahmad and the development was said to be occurred because of budget cuts for the show. The opening and closing was executed by Frieha Altaf where she also launched the #MeinBhi campaign which aimed to aimed to cover several human rights violations.

== Winners and Nominees ==
The nominees for the 17th Lux Style Awards were announced in January 2018.

Here’s who won at 17th Lux Style Awards. Winners are listed first in boldface

=== Film ===
**Best Film**: **Punjab Nahi Jaungi**; Balu Mahi; Chupan Chupai; Na Maloom Afraad 2; Verna	**Best Director**: **Nadeem Baig** - **Punjab Nahi Jaungi**; Haisaam Hussain - Balu Mahi; Mohsin Ali - Chupan Chupai; Nabeel Qureshi - Na Maloom Afraad 2; Shoaib Mansoor - Verna
**Best Actor**: **Humayun Saeed - Punjab Nahi Jaungi**; Ahsan Khan - Chupan Chupai; Fahad Mustafa - Na Maloom Afraad 2; Mohsin Abbas - Na Maloom Afraad 2; Osman Khalid Butt - Balu Mahi	**Best Actress**: **Mahira Khan - Verna**; Ainy Jaffri - Balu Mahi; Mehwish Hayat - Punjab Nahi Jaungi; Uzma Hasan - Arth 2; Neelum Muneer - Chupan Chupai
**Best Supporting Actor**: **Javed Sheikh - Na Maloom Afraad 2**; Ali Rizvi - Chupan Chupai; Faizan Khawaja - Chupan Chupai; Sohail Ahmed - Punjab Nahi Jaungi; Gohar Rasheed - Rangreza	**Best Supporting Actress**: **Urwa Hocane - Punjab Nahi Jaungi**; Durdana Butt - Balu Mahi; Humaima Mallick - Arth 2; Sadaf Kanwal - Balu Mahi; Zhalay Sarhadi - Chalay Thay Saath
**Best Singer Male**: **Rahat Fateh Ali Khan - ‘Sawaar De’ from Arth 2**; Adnan Dhool - ‘Sadqa’ from Chupan Chupai; Haroon Shahid - ‘Sambhal Sambhal’ from Verna; Mohsin Haider Abbas - ‘Heeray’ from Na Maloom Afraad 2; Sahir Ali Bagga - ‘Murshid Jee’ of Arth 2	**Best Singer Female**: **Aima Baig - ‘Sadqa’ from Chupan Chupai**; Aima Baig - ‘Kaif O Soroor’ from Na Maloom Afraad 2; Jonita Gandhi - ‘Baqiya’ from Rangreza; Nirmal Roy - ‘Raunaq-e- Aashiqui’ from Punjab Nahi Jaungi; Sana Zulfiqar - ‘Aadat’ from Arth 2

=== Music ===
**Album Of The Year**: **Wajd - Hadiqa Kiani**; 36 - Sikander ka Mandar; 600 Saal - E Sharp; Elhaam - Sounds of Kolachi; Fanoos - Zohaib Kazi	**Singer Of The Year**: **Ali Hamza, Ali Sethi and Waqar Ehsan - ‘Tanak Dhin’**; Abid Brohi - ‘The Sibbi Song’; Ali Azmat and Qurat ul Ain Baluch - ‘Chal Diye’; Lyari Underground - ‘Players of Lyari’; Riaz Qadri and Zohaib Kazi - ‘Takht Hazar’
**Best Music Video Director**: **Raza Shah - ‘The Sibbi Song’**; Qamar Anwer - ‘Kasani’; Sana Jaffri - ‘Madam’; Taimoor Salahuddin - ‘Chan Kithan’; Waleed Ahmed - ‘Super Cat	**Best Emerging Talent**: **Kashmir**; Abdullah Siddiqui; Badnaam; Keeray Makoray; Roots

=== Television ===
Best Television Play	Best Television Director
**Baaghi (Urdu 1)**; Muqabil (ARY Digital); O Rangreza (Hum TV); Sang-e-Mar Mar (Hum TV); Alif Allah Aur Insaan (Hum TV)	**Saif-e-Hassan - Sang-e-Mar Mar (Hum TV)**; Farooq Rind - Baaghi (Urdu 1); Saife Hassan - Sammi (Hum TV); Kashif Nisar - O Rangreza (Hum TV); Aehsun Talish - Alif Allah Aur Insaan (Hum TV)
Best Television Actor	Best Television Actress
**Ahad Raza Mir – Yaqeen Ka Safar (Hum TV)**; Adnan Siddiqui – Sammi (Hum TV); Imran Abbas – Khuda Aur Mohabbat (season 2) (Geo TV); Noman Ejaz – Pinjra (A Plus); Mohsin Abbas Haider – Muqabil (ARY Digital)	**Saba Qamar – Baaghi (Urdu 1)**; Sajal Aly – Yaqeen Ka Safar (Hum TV); Sajal Aly – O Rangreza (Hum TV); Kubra Khan – Muqabil (ARY Digital); Bushra Ansari-Seeta Bagri (TV One)
Best Television Writer	Best Television Track
**Mustafa Afridi - Sang-e-Mar Mar (Hum TV)**; Noorul Huda Shah - Sammi (Hum TV); Qaisra Hayat - Alif Allah Aur Insaan (Hum TV); Saji Gul - O Rangreza (Hum TV); Zafar Mairaj - Muqabil (ARY Digital)	**Shuja Haider - Baaghi (Urdu 1)**; Adnan Dhool & Sana Zulfiqar - Bay Khudi (ARY Digital); Jimmy Khan - Tumhare Hain (ARY Digital); Nabeel Shaukat Ali – Woh Aik Pal (Hum TV); Sahir Ali Bagga – O Rangreza (Hum TV)

=== Fashion ===
**Model Of The Year - Male**: **Hasnain Lehri**; Aimal Khan; Champ Imi; Omer Shahzad; Shahzad Noor	**Model Of The Year - Female**: **Amna Babar**; Anam Malik; Hira Shah; Sadaf Kanwal; Zara Abid
**Achievement In Fashion Design - Pret**: Sana Safinaz; Chapter 2 by Khaadi; Cross Stitch; Generation; Sapphire	**Achievement In Fashion Design - Luxury Pret**: Sania Maskatiya; Elan; Mahgul; Misha Lakhani; Shamaeel Ansari
**Achievement In Fashion Design - Bridal**: **Sana Safinaz**; Ali Xeeshan; Elan; Faraz Manan; Mahgul	**Achievement In Fashion Design - Lawn**: **Elan**; Mahgul; Sana Safinaz; Shehla Chatoor; Zara Shahjahan
**Best Menswear Designer**: **Republic by Omar Farooq**; Amir Adnan; Deepak and Fahad; Deepak Perwani; HSY	**Best Hair & Makeup Artist**: **Qasim Liaqat**; Fatima Nasir; Hannan Siddique; Saima Rashid; Shoaib Khan
**Best Fashion Photographer**: **Rizwan ul Haq**; Abdullah Haris; Alee Hassan; Nadir Firoz Khan; Shahbaz Shazi	**Best Emerging Talent**: **Saheefa Jabbar Khatak (Model)**; Fahmeen Ansari (Model); Hussain Rehar (Designer); Javeria Hanif (Model); MHM Photography (Photographer)

=== Best Dressed Male ===
- Abrar Ul Haq

=== Best Dressed Female ===
- Nabila

=== Lifetime Achievement Award ===
- Frieha Altaf received the Lifetime Achievement Award.
