= Sanwal Esakhelvi =

British-Pakistani, singer, musician and songwriter

- Born: Sanwal Attaullah Khan Esakhelvi; Mianwali, Punjab, Pakistan
- Education: City, University of London
- Occupations: Singer; songwriter; record producer; visual effects supervisor; sound designer
- Years active: 2010-present
- Parent(s): Attaullah Khan Esakhelvi; Bazgha
- Family: Laraib Atta; Bilawal Atta
- Musical career
- Genres: Saraiki; Punjabi; electronic music
- Instruments: Vocals; guitar; piano; harmonium

Sanwal Khan Esakhelvi is a British-Pakistani visual effects supervisor, sound designer, singer, musician and songwriter. Before establishing himself as a singer, Esakhelvi was a professional cricketer until 2006 and has worked in British film industry as a VFX artist and sound engineer. He released his first album Teray Khayal Mein (2017) and debuted as a featured artist in the tenth season of Coke Studio along with his father.

== Personal life ==
Esakhelvi was born to veteran Saraiki singer Attaullah Khan Esakhelvi, while his mother Bazgha was a renowned actress and his sister Laraib Atta is a professional VFX artist who has worked for several Oscar winning Hollywood films. He also has one brother, Bilawal, who is an actor and director based in London, as well as also being a musician. Esakhelvi graduated from City, University of London in sound engineering when an injury made him quit his professional cricket career, "I was always into sports but then an injury forced music to take over."

== Discography ==
=== Album ===
Year	Album
2016	Teray Khayal Mein

=== Television ===
==== Soundtracks ====
Year	Title	Song	Lyrics	Music	Co-singer(s)
2017	Ishq Tamasha - OST	Ishq Tamasha			Sanam Marvi
2018	Bisaat e Dil - OST	Bisaat e Dil	Sabir Zafar	Shuja Hyder	

=== Coke Studio Pakistan ===
Year	Season	Song	Lyrics	Music	Co-singer(s)
2017	10	Qaumi Taranah	Hafeez Jullundhri	Strings	Season's ft. artists
2017	10	Sab Maya Hai	Strings	Strings	Attaullah Khan Esakhelvi
2018	11	Hum Dekhenge	Faiz Ahmed Faiz	Ali Hamza, Zohaib Kazi	Season's ft. artists
2018	11	Allah Karesi			Attaullah Khan Esakhelvi
