= 7th Lux Style Awards =

2008 Pakistani awards ceremony

- Date: 29 October 2008
- Site: Expo Centre, Karachi
- Hosted by: Shaan Shahid, Fawad Khan and Ali Azmat

Highlights
- Best Film: Khuda Kay Liye
- Best Actor: Shaan Shahid

Television coverage
- Channel: Geo TV

The 2008 Lux Style Awards, officially known as the 7th Lux Style Awards ceremony, presented by the Lux Style Awards honours the best films of 2008 and took place at the DHA Golf Club, Karachi on 29 October 2008. This year, the city of lights played host to the Pakistani Film Industry. It was the first Lux Style Awards ceremony broadcast by Geo TV.

The official ceremony took place on 29 Oct, 08, at the Expo Centre, in Karachi. During the ceremony, Lux Style Awards were awarded in 29 competitive categories. The ceremony was televised in Pakistan and internationally on Geo TV. Actor Shaan Shahid, Fawad Khan and rockstar Ali Azmat hosted the ceremony.

- Previous Ceremony: 6th Lux Style Awards
- Next Ceremony: 8th Lux Style Awards

== Background ==
The Lux Style Awards is an award ceremony held annually in Pakistan since 2002. The awards celebrate "style" in the Pakistani entertainment industry, and honour the country's best talents in film, television, music, and fashion. Around 30 awards are given annually.

== Winners and nominees ==
Winners are listed first and highlighted in boldface.

2008 Nominees and Winners
Category	Nominees	Winner
Film
Best Film	N/A	Khuda Kay Liye
Best Film Actor	N/A	Shaan Shahid-Khuda Kay Liye
Best Film Actress	N/A	Iman Ali-Khuda Kay Liye
Best Original Soundtrack	N/A	Khuda Kay Liye-Rohail Hayat
Television
Best Television Play (Terrestrial)	Hazaron Khwahishen-ATV; Meray Dard Ko Jo Zuban Miley-PTV; Sukhan-ATV; Yaadain-PTV	Lyari Express-(PTV)
Best Television Actor (Terrestrial)	Mehmood Aslam-Hazaron Khwahishen (ATV); Shabbir Jan-Lyari Express (PTV); Shafi Muhammad-Sukhan (ATV); Waqas Khan-Hazaron Khwahishen (ATV)	Asif Raza Mir-Meray Dard Ko Jo Zuban Miley (PTV)
Best Television Actress (Terrestrial)	Azra Aftab-Hazaron Khawahishen (ATV); Javeria Abbasi-Sukhan (ATV); Salma Zafar-Lyari Express (PTV); Rabia Tabassum-Muqaddar Kahan Say Laayen (ATV)	Beenish Chohan-Pehli Boond (PTV)
Best Television Director (Terrestrial)	Ali Rizvi-Meray Dard Ko Jo Zuban Miley (PTV); Sohail Iftikhar Khan-Sukhan (ATV)	Manzoor Magsi-Lyari Express (PTV)
Best Television Play (Satellite)	Muqaddas-ARY Digital; Vanee-Geo TV; Shikwah-Geo TV; Najia-Hum TV	Man-O-Salwa-Hum TV
Best Television Actor (Satellite)	Sohail Asghar-Vanee (Geo TV); Noman Ijaz-Man-O-Salwa (Hum TV); Sajid Hasan-Shikwah (Geo TV); Ahsan Khan-Muqaddas (ARY Digital)	Humayun Saeed-Koi Toh Barish (ARY Digital)
Best Television Actress (Satellite)	Javeria Abbasi-Najia (Hum TV); Resham-Man-O-Salwa (Hum TV); Saba Hameed-Vanee (Geo TV); Savera Nadeem-Shikwah (Geo TV)	Bushra Ansari-Vanee (Geo TV)
Best Television Director (Satellite)	Babar Javed-Man-O-Salwa (Hum TV); Rubina Ashraf-Vanee (Geo TV); Barkat Siddiqui-Shikwah (Geo TV); Roomi Insha-Najia (Hum TV)	Anjum Shahzad-Pehla Chaand (Geo TV)
Music
Best Song of the Year	Aesi Taisi-Azal; Bandeya-Khawar Jawad & Faiza Mujahid; Laari Chooti-Call (band); Roya Rey-Shiraz Uppal	Sajni-Jal (Band)
Best Live Act	Josh (band); Mouj; Mekaal Hasan Band; Overload (Pakistani band)	Strings (band)
Best Album of the Year	Janay Do-Ali Haider; Meri Kahani-Atif Aslam; Rozen-e-Deewar-Roxen (band); Naara Sada Ishq Aey-Abrar-ul-Haq	Boondh-Jal
Best Video Director	Uns Mufti-Broken Boundaries; Bilal Lashari-Sajni; Soheb Akhtar-Ujaalon Mein	Bilal Lashari-Dhamaal
Fashion
Best Model of the Year (male)	Hareeb Farooqui; Iftikhar Zafar; Riawan Ali Jaffri; Abdullah Ejaz	Ameer Zeb Khan
Best Model of the Year (female)	Nadia Ali; Nooray Bhatty; Fouzia Aman; Fayeza Ansari	Neha Ahmed
Best Retail Brand	Labels; CrossRoads; Ego; Stoneage	Khaadi
Best Achievement in Fashion Design (Menswear)	Zahid Khan; Ammar Belal; Munib Nawaz; Ismail Farid	Deepak Perwani
Best Achievement in Fashion Design (Couture)	Sana Safinaz; Umar Sayeed; Nilofer Shahid; Saadia Mirza; Abroo Hashimi	Rizwan Baig
Best Achievement in Fashion Design (Prét)	Sonya Battla; Sara Shahid; Iman Ahmed; Kamiar Rokni	Maheen Karim
Best Fashion Photographer/Videographer	Guddu Shani; Maram Azmat; Khawar Riaz; Rizwan Baig	Rizwan-ul-Haq
Best Fashion Makeup & Hair Artist	Guddu Shani; Maram Azmat & Abroo Hashmi; Musarrat Misbah; Rizwan Baig	Khawar Riaz
Best Emerging Talent in Fashion	Fayyaz Ahmed; Anoushay; Nida Azwar; Fazal Abbas	Rabia Butt

== Special awards ==
=== Chairperson's Lifetime Achievement Award ===
- Reshma

==== Lifetime Achievement Award in Fashion ====
- Sughra Kazmi

==== Best Dressed Celebrity (female) ====
- Tooba Siddiqui

==== Best Dressed Celebrity (male) ====
- Atif Aslam
