= Salahuddin Tunio =

Pakistani television and film actor

- Born: 28 February 1949 (age 77); Qambar, Sindh, Pakistan
- Occupations: Actor, Sindhi TV personality
- Years active: 1990s–present
- Children: 4, including Fahad Mustafa

Salahuddin Tunio (Sindhi: صلاح الدين تونيو, Urdu: صلاح الدين تونيو; born 28 February 1949) is a Pakistani actor in television and film. He is the father of actor-producer Fahad Mustafa.

== Early life and education ==
Tunio was born to Muhammad Ibrahim Tunio on 28 February 1949, in the village Dhanibux Tunio near Qambar, Sindh. He completed his matriculation from Government High School Sukkur and later earned a B.Sc. and M.Sc. in Chemistry from the University of Sindh. In 1979, he was appointed as a chemistry lecturer at Allama Iqbal College in Karachi. He later entered public service, joining the Health Department as a Drug Inspector in 1981, and retired in 2009 as Chief Drug Inspector.

== Career ==
=== Cinema ===
In a 2025 interview with Dawn, Tunio stated that after the death of actor Waheed Murad during the production of the 1985 film Hero, director Iqbal Yusuf approached him to complete the remaining scenes of the film. Tunio said he was considered for the role due to his resemblance to Murad, but he declined the offer and chose to continue focusing on television rather than moving into film at that stage of his career.

=== Television ===
He has acted in numerous Sindhi and Urdu TV dramas.

== Awards and recognition ==
In 2014, Salahuddin Tunio was awarded the Pride of Performance by the Government of Pakistan in recognition of his contributions to television and the performing arts. The civil award was conferred by the President of Pakistan on Independence Day as part of the annual national honours ceremony.

== Selected filmography ==
=== Television series ===
Year	Title	Role	Network	Notes
1990	Choti Si Duniya	Bhoora Khan	PTV	
1993	Badaltey Mausam	Pervaiz	PTV	
2009	Tanveer Fatima (B.A)	Dilawar Ali Khan	Geo Entertainment	
2011	Meri Subh Ka Sitara	Nawaz Ikram	Geo Entertainment	
2011	Ek Hatheli Pe Hina Ek Hatheli Pe Lahoo	Miskeen Ali "Nazim Saheb"	Geo Entertainment	
2012	Aks	Cheema	ARY Digital	
2012	Main Gunehgar Nahi	Ammara's father-in-law	ARY Digital	
2014	Bashar Momin	Politician	Geo Entertainment	
2015	Rang Laaga	Inspector Shaukat	ARY Digital	
2015	Bay Qasoor	Amin	ARY Digital	
2016	Joru Ka Ghulam	Khalid	Geo Entertainment	
2017	Bubbly Kya Chahti Hai	Rasheed Mirchi	ARY Digital	Lead role
2017	Aisi Hai Tanhai	Lawyer	ARY Digital	
2018	Khalish	Jabbar Lakhi	Geo Entertainment	
2018	Pari Hun Mein		Express TV	
2018	Ab Dekh Khuda Kya Karta Hai	Minister	Geo Entertainment	
2019	Chand Ki Pariyan	Iqbal (Bala)	ARY Digital	
2023	Bandish 2	Baba Sahab	ARY Digital	

=== Films ===
Year	Title	Notes
2026	Aag Lagay Basti Mein	
