= Main Gunehgar Nahi =

- Genre: Drama
- Starring: Mawra Hocane; Sami Khan
- Country of origin: Pakistan
- Original language: Urdu
- No. of episodes: 21

Production
- Running time: Approx. 40 minutes

Original release
- Network: Ary Digital
- Release: 26 November 2012 – 15 April 2013

Main Gunehgar Nahi (Urdu: میں گناہگار نہیں, lit. 'I am no sinner') is a 2013 Pakistani television series aired on Ary Digital. Mawra Hocane and Sami Khan played the leading roles, while Shamoon Abbasi and Faizan Khawaja appeared in pivotal roles. Main Gunehgar Nahi had 21 episodes and was a commercial success.

The show was also telecast in India on Zindagi from 25 March 2015 under the title "Ladki Hona Gunaah Nahin".

== Plot ==
Main Gunehgar Nahi is the tragic portrayal of a male-dominated society and its double standards. A young woman named Ammara has her world turned upside down after she is the victim of a heinous crime. She is treated as a culprit and made to feel ashamed even though she is not guilty of anything. The people she trusts turn away from her.

Ammara is engaged to her neighbor Faizan. Faizan promised that he would never leave Ammara. When three men, sons of rich men merely amusing themselves, rape her, Faizan breaks their engagement. It causes her to lose all trust and hope. Everyone treats her as a criminal. She marries Zubair, who only wants her for her money. On the same day, Faizan marries Maira, who is in love with another man. In contrast, Ammara does everything for Zubair's happiness, but he mistreats her. Everyone wants to use Ammara for her money, except Zubair's brother, Talha, who treats her like a sister.

One day, Zubair takes Ammara to a party. After enticing her to dress seductively, his real intent is revealed; he sells her for a business deal, but Ammara escapes before anything happens. She realizes that she hasn't done anything wrong and wonders why the world treats her as a sinner. After leaving the party, she meets Zaid, who helps her by giving her a ride home and bringing back her trust in men. Eventually, the two become friends.

Ammara asks Zubair to give her divorce, but Zubair doesn't take it seriously since he sees Ammara as a weak woman who can't survive without him. She becomes a strong woman, he divorces her, and she moves back to her father's house. Jumshaid's wife demands they move, as she doesn't want her daughters to live with Ammara. Jumshaid moves his family to a new home but isn't happy with his wife's decision.

Faizan, his mother and his sister leave for a family wedding. His wife, Maira, stays home and calls Abbas after everyone has left. A minor accident on the way to the wedding causes the family to come home early, catching Maira and Abbas together. Faizan divorces Maira. It makes him realize how badly he treated Ammara and how much he misses her. He sends his mother, who hadn't treated Ammara any better, to Ammara's house with a proposal of marriage. Jumshaid gets angry and rejects Faizan's proposal.

Zubair goes to Zaid, who turns out to be a journalist, to tell him about Ammara's rape scandal, asking to publish it as "chatpati" news in the newspaper. Zaid refuses angrily, and throws Zubair out. Zubair discovers he is dying of liver cancer. When Ammara finds out, she gives ten lakhs to Zubair's parents for his treatment. On his deathbed, Zubair asks his father to go to Ammara and apologize to her and then dies. When his father goes to Ammara's house, he returns her money and apologizes; She forgives everyone.

The three men who raped Ammara make a plan to rob Jumshaid's house. Before the robbery, they go to a restaurant where Ammara while dining with Zaid, recognizes them. She informs Zaid about who they are causing Zaid to want to fight them, but Ammara stops him, saying "humain sabit qadam rehna chahiye warna inhe shuk ho jaye ga,Ye jab dakaiti kar rhe hongay tau inhe rangay hathoon pakarwain gay". Instead, he calls his friend, a senior rank of police, to send his team of police to follow the men.

The men go to Jamshaid's house, planning to rape his wife, but the police arrive and arrest them before they can. When she learns she was saved because of Ammara, she feels regretful. Ammara is nominated for ten fashion designers awards. She gives Zaid an interview for his newspaper with the title "Main Gunehgar Nahin". With Zaid's urging, Ammara agrees to marry Faizan. When he learns they're engaged, he realizes how much he loves her, unaware that Ammara also loves him very much. Faizan asks her to go to Zaid; he says that "jao main ne pehle bhi tumhain boht taqleef Di hai agar tum Zaid k sath khush ho tau jao ghar waloon ko mein samjha loonga". She confesses her love to Zaid, and they get married.

== Cast ==
- Mawra Hocane as Ammara
- Sami Khan as Faizan (Ammara's fiancé)
- Shamoon Abbasi as Zubair
- Faizan Khawaja as Zaid
- Danish Ali as Talha
- Hira Pervaiz as Myra (Faizan's wife)
- Farooq Zameer as Ammara's Father
- Salahuddin Tunio as Ammara's father-in-law
- Amsa Ali
- Binita Marshal

== Reception ==
A reviewer from The Quint noted the strong narrative of the series appreciating the handling of the sensitive topic of rape and its aftermath responsibly.
