= Bazgha =

Pakistani actress (born 1960)

- Born: Bazgha Begum; 8 June 1960 (age 66); Lahore, Pakistan
- Education: Lahore Girls College
- Occupations: Actress; Singer; Radio artist
- Years active: 1980 – 2015
- Spouse: Attaullah Khan Esakhelvi (m. 1985)
- Children: Sanwal Esakhelvi (son); Laraib Atta (daughter); Bilawal Atta (son)

Bazgha is a Pakistani actress. She acted in both Urdu and Punjabi films and is known for her roles in films Saima (1980), Athra Puttar (1981), Amanat (1981), Khubsoorat (1982), Ek Din Bahu Ka (1982), Dehleez (1983), and Tina (1983).

== Early life ==
Bazgha was born in Lahore, Pakistan and completed her education from Lahore Girls College.

== Career ==
Baghza made her debut as an actress in the film Saima with Babra Sharif, Rahat Kazmi, Nadeem Baig, and Bahar Begum, in which she portrayed the role of Yasmin. The film was directed by Mohammad Javed Fazil. The film was a box office super hit, and she won the Nigar Award for Best Supporting Actress.

Then in 1981 she worked in films Samjhota, Athra Puttra, Faslay, and Amanat. In 1982, she worked in Urdu films Khubsoorat and Raja Sahib. The same year, the film Ek Din Bahu Ka, in which she played the lead role of a daughter-in-law, was a box-office hit.

In 1983, she worked in the film Tine. The film was written by Syed Noor and directed by Jan Mohammad, starring Mohammad Ali, Babra Sharif, Faisal Rehman, and Waseem Abbas. The film was a super hit at the box office, and she won the Nigar Award for Best Supporting Actress.

After she married folk singer Attaullah Khan Esakhelvi, they appeared together on stage and in musical programs. They sang Urdu and Punjabi songs.

In 2015, she appeared in film Eid Ayee Pardes Mein directed and written by Shafiq-ur Rehman and with some shooting in London and Pakistan. Then she retired from acting.

== Personal life ==
Bazgha married folk singer Attaullah Khan Esakhelvi and they have three children. Her elder son Sanwal Esakhelvi is a singer and her daughter Laraib Atta is a VFX artist.

== Filmography ==
=== Film ===
Year	Film	Language
1980	Saima	Urdu
1980	Samjhota	Urdu
1981	Athra Puttar	Punjabi
1981	Faslay	Urdu
1981	Amanat	Urdu
1982	Khubsoorat	Urdu
1982	Aangan	Urdu
1982	Raja Sahib	Urdu
1982	Ek Din Bahu Ka	Urdu
1983	Dehleez	Urdu
1983	Insaf Ka Tarazoo	Urdu
1983	Deevana Mastana	Punjabi
1983	Tina	Urdu
1983	Da Insaf Tala	Pashto
1983	Deevangi	Urdu
1984	Commander	Punjabi
1984	Ucha Shamla Jatt Da	Punjabi
1984	Laraka	Punjabi
1985	2 Hathkarian	Punjabi
1986	Mama Saray Shehar Da	Punjabi
1986	Kali Basti	Punjabi
2015	Eid Ayee Pardes Mein	Urdu

== Awards and recognition ==
Year	Award	Category	Result	Title	Ref.
1980	Nigar Award	Best Supporting Actress	Won	Saima	
1983	Nigar Award	Best Supporting Actress	Won	Tina	
