= Billo De Ghar =

Pakistani music album

Billo De Ghar بلو دے گھر

Studio album by Abrar-ul-Haq
- Released: 1995
- Genres: Pakistani pop; bhangra; rap; rock

Abrar-ul-Haq chronology
Billo De Ghar بلو دے گھر (1995)	Majajani (1998)

Billo De Ghar (Punjabi: بلو دے گھر) is the debut album by Pakistani pop singer Abrar-ul-Haq. It was written, composed and sung by the artist and became a best selling album in South Asia at the time of its release in 1995. As of 2004, over 16 million copies have been sold of the album, which features Punjabi and Urdu songs.

Although the album's title song "Billo De Ghar" is in Punjabi, only two other of the album's ten tracks are in Punjabi; the rest are in Urdu.

"Billo De Ghar" describes a man trying to meet with a girl, Billo, and is harassed by an assortment of police and moralists in the process. The song became a subject of some controversy when Urdu newspapers began quoting Lahori mullahs who claimed the song describing a man falling in love with a prostitute and wanting to marry her. Upon the formation of Nawaz Sharif's PML-N majority government after the 1997 election, the song was banned from state-owned TV and radio channels. Abrar-ul-Haq has continued to follow up on the long-standing popularity of the song since its release. His 2016 album Billo Returns Aithay Rakh offered new material for fans of the song, with the track "Aaj Bhi Billo Zinda Hai" in particular resurrecting the theme.

"Murree Shehry Di Niki," is another the three Punjabi tracks, and is in a dialect of Punjabi called Pothohari which is mostly spoken in Murree, Islamabad and Rawalpindi. It may be influenced by the time Abrar spent in Islamabad for his Master's degree.

== Track listing ==
1. "Billo" (a.k.a. "Billo De Ghar")
2. "Murree Shehry Di Niki"
3. "Aaja Na"
4. "Hum Tum Mile The"
5. "Sohni Surat"
6. "Agar Kabhi"
7. "Alam E Bhaghawat"
8. "Allah Pakistan"
9. "Sachian Te Koorian"
10. "Dil Pe Hamare Jo Chaye"
