= Amanat (1981 film) =

1981 film

- Directed by: Rangeela; Javed Raza
- Screenplay by: Basheer Niaz
- Produced by: Rangeela; Sheikh Ishfaq Ahmad
- Starring: Rangeela; Ghulam Mohayuddin; Bazgha; Allauddin; Aslam Pervaiz; Mazhar Shah] Talat Siddiqui; Saqi
- Narrated by: Gogi Riaz
- Cinematography: Umar Farooq
- Edited by: Shaukat Pervaiz
- Music by: Kamal Ahmed
- Distributed by: Aashiyana Films Pvt Ltd
- Release date: 18 December 1981
- Running time: 155 minutes
- Country: Pakistan
- Language: Punjabi

Amanat (Punjabi: امانت) is a 1981 Punjabi-language Pakistani comedy and romance film, directed by Javed Raza and noted comedian Rangeela.

== Cast ==
- Rangeela – Badshah
- Ghulam Mohayuddin – 'Doctor'
- Bazgha – Chambaily (double role)
- Talat Siddiqui – mother of Chambaily
- Aslam Pervaiz – Halaku Khan
- Iqbal Bukhari
- Anyila – child actress
- Allauddin
- Masood Akhtar
- Mazhar Shah
- Ali Ejaz
- Saqi

== Track list ==
The music of the film is by musician Kamal Ahmed. The lyrics were written by Waris Ludhianvi and Khawaja Pervez. The singers were:

- Mehdi Hassan
- Mehnaz
- Ghulam Abbas
- Naheed Akhtar

#	Title	Singer(s)
1	"Main Baghan Di Khushboo Lae Ke Gallian Dey Wich Aa Gaii Aan"	Mehnaz
2	"Sohna Mun Mohna Merey Dil Da Chaen"	Mehnaz
3	"Aa Sajna Wadah Ker Laye"	Ghulam Abbas & Mehnaz
4	"Sohnay Mun Mohnay Do Sharmeelay Nain"	Mehdi Hassan
5	"Veeni Na Marod Sajna"	Naheed Akhtar & Mehnaz
6	"Way Baimana Bhul Te Nai Gayyaan Yaadan Merian"	Mehnaz
