= Abrar-ul-Haq =

Pakistani singer-songwriter, philanthropist, politician (born 1969)

- ابرار الحق
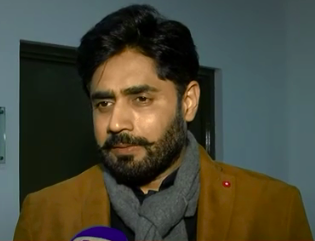
- Abrar-ul-Haq in 2018
- Born: 21 July 1969 (age 57); Narowal, Punjab, Pakistan
- Education: Sir Syed College; Quaid-i-Azam University
- Occupations: Singer-songwriter; Philanthropist; Politician
- Notable work: Sughra Shafi Medical Hospital Complex; Sahara Medical College
- Office: Founder/Chairman Sahara for Life Trust
- Children: 4
- Parent(s): Sughra and Shafi Kahloon
- Awards: Lux Style Awards; PTV Awards
- Honours: Tamgha-e-Imtiaz (2005); Sitara-e-Eisaar (2006)
- Musical career
- Genres: Pop; Bhangra; Punjabi Music
- Years active: 1995–present
- Labels: Sound Master; Moviebox Record; TP Gold; Fire Records; Kali Denali Music; Beyond Records; Coke Studio
- Website: saharaforlife.org

Abrar-ul-Haq (Punjabi: ابرار الحق) is a Pakistani singer-songwriter, philanthropist, and former politician.

His debut 1995 album Billo De Ghar sold over 16 million copies worldwide, which made him a household name and granted him the title of "King of Pakistani pop and bhangra".

Abrar-ul-Haq is the founder and chairman of Sahara for Life Trust, a private organization that has been providing health services to the people of Narowal and surrounding areas since 1998. He was Pakistan Tehreek-e-Insaf's candidate for the seat of National Assembly from constituency NA-78 (Narowal-II) in the 2018 Pakistani general election.

== Early life and education ==
Abrar-ul-Haq was born in Faisalabad, Punjab to a civil servant father, and is the youngest among eight siblings. He belongs to a Punjabi Jat family of the Kahlon clan. His elder brother, Major (r) Israr-ul-Haq Kahlon, is an active politician in Narowal.

He was initially educated at the Junior Model School, Gujrat later graduating from the Sir Syed College, Rawalpindi before getting his Master's degree in social sciences from the Quaid-i-Azam University, Islamabad.

== Academic career ==
Abrar-ul-Haq briefly served as a geography teacher at Aitchison College, Lahore in 1996, but quit the faculty when he opted for a career in music.

== Music career ==
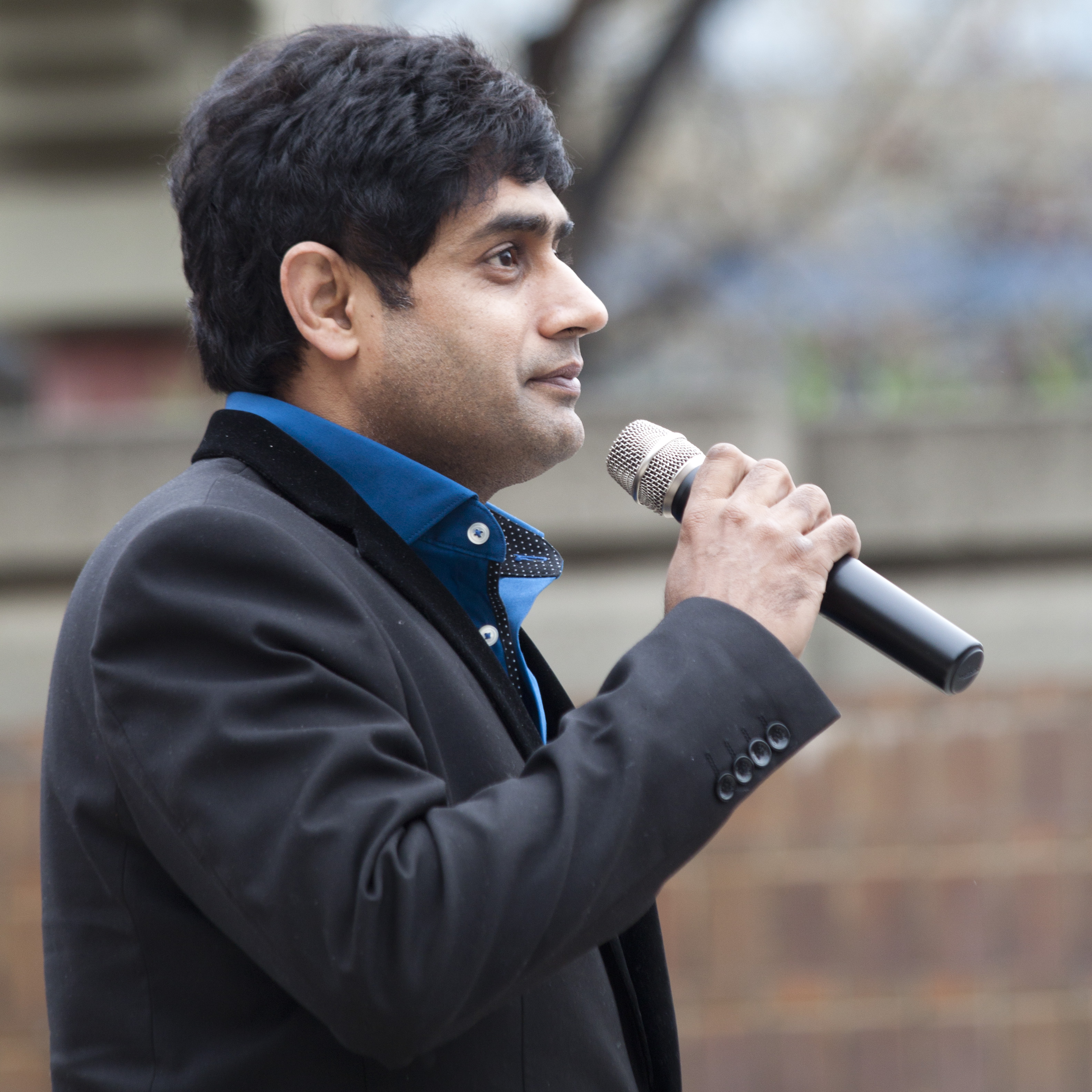
Abrar-ul-Haq in Calgary (2014)

His first music album as a singer was Billo De Ghar, which was released in 1995.

=== Controversies ===
Many of Abrar-ul-Haq's songs have been a subject of controversy in Pakistan. After the release of the hit song Billo De Ghar in 1995, Urdu newspapers began quoting Islamic scholars of Lahore who were of the opinion that the song was describing a man falling in love with a prostitute and wanting to marry her. Upon the formation of Nawaz Sharif's PML-N majority government after the 1997 election, the song was banned from state-owned TV and radio channels.

In the early 2000s, his song Nach Punjaban was met with opposition from those who thought the casual use of the word Punjaban was a demeaning way to address Punjabi women, eventually resulting in Abrar-ul-Haq re-recording a version of the song using the word Majajan instead.

In 2007, the Supreme Court of Pakistan summoned the singer for an explanation of the song Parveen from the album Nara Sada Ishq Aye, alleging that it used the name Parveen in a derogatory manner that would hurt the sentiments of society.

In 2019, his song Chamkeeli was the subject of a claim in a civil court in Lahore, with the courts requesting that the song be banned and removed from YouTube, alleging that it was humiliating and insulting to both men and women.

== Philanthropy ==
=== Sahara for Life Trust ===
Abrar-ul-Haq is the Founder and Chairman of Sahara for Life Trust (SLT), a post he has held since its inception in 1998. SLT is a private organization promoting health and education in remote areas. SAHARA stands for: "Services Aimed at Health and Awakening in Remote Areas". SLT is recognized and registered as a leading charitable organization in Pakistan, the U.K, and the U.S. It is also certified by the Pakistan Center for Philanthropy (PCP) and the U.N. (under the charter of DESA). SLT has been involved in numerous relief and rehabilitation efforts over the years. In 2003, SLT established its first large-scale general hospital in Narowal, Pakistan. The Sughra Shafi Medical Hospital Complex is a PMDC-certified general hospital that provides a wide range of healthcare services to the people of Narowal and its surrounding areas. The location of this hospital also reduced the travel time for patients in critical condition who were unable to travel to major cities in a timely manner, thus saving lives.

=== Niaz Support social enterprise ===
In 2023, he was appointed the global goodwill ambassador of Niaz Support. This is a social enterprise in Pakistan that provides customized wheelchairs to people with disabilities. It also involves them in the manufacturing process, creating employment opportunities for them

== Political career ==
=== Youth Parliament of Pakistan ===
In 2006, he founded the Youth Parliament of Pakistan (YPP), a non-profit, non-political, and non-religious program.

=== Pakistan Tehreek-e-Insaf (2011–2023) ===
In December 2011 Abrar-ul-Haq joined Pakistan Tehreek-e-Insaf.

In 2012, he was appointed as President of the Youth Wing of PTI. In 2013, he was appointed as PTI's Secretary of Foreign Affairs.

He ran for a seat on the National Assembly as PTI's Candidate for Constituency NA-117 (Narowal-III) in the 2013 Pakistani general elections receiving 51,359 votes and lost to PML-N's Ahsan Iqbal.

He was again nominated as PTI's Candidate for National Assembly Constituency NA-78 (Narowal-II) for the 2018 Pakistani general elections but received 88,250 votes and lost to PML-N's Ahsan Iqbal.

On 15 November 2019, he was appointed Pakistan Red Crescent Society's 16th chairman and assumed office on 27 December 2019.

In 2023, he left the PTI emotionally, and quit politics following the controversy surrounding the May 9 riots.

== Personal life ==
Abrar has been married to his wife Hareem since 2005, together they have a son named Taha, who is a graphic designer.

Abrar's brother Israr is a retired army major.

== Discography ==
=== Albums ===
Year	Title	Label
1995	Billo De Ghar	Moviebox Record Label
1998	Majajani	Sound Master
1999	Bay Ja Cycle Te	Sound Master
2000	Mein Gaddi Aap Chalawan Ga	Sound Master
2002	Nach Punjaban	Moviebox Record Label
2002	Assan Jana Mall-o Mall	DJ Gold
2004	Nachan Main Audhay Naal	TP Gold
2007	Nara Sada Ishq Aye	Fire Records
2013	Sab Rang Aap (Pbuh) Se	Moviebox Record Label
2016	Billo Returns Aithay Rakh	ARY Musik

=== Studio releases ===
Year	Title	Label
2006	Collaborations with Gurdas Maan & Sukshinder Shinda	Moviebox Record Label
2008	Sar Jalayn Gay Roshani Hogee	Moviebox Record Label
2009	Awain Na Kar Zulm Ke Ik Din Muk Jana	Moviebox Record Label
2010	Sar Utha Ke	Moviebox Record Label
2011	Ki Karan Day O with Shahzaman and Jawad Kahlon	Moviebox Record Label
2011	Sohniye-Heeriye with Bhinda Aujla (film: Love Mein Ghum)	Reema Khan Film
2011	Ishqe Da Rang, music by Prince Ghuman	Speed Records and Inda Raikoti
2013	Hogya Ni Piyar with Suman, music by Khiza	Moviebox Record Label
2013	Pani Da Bulbula (film: Zinda Bhaag)	Mazhar Zaidi Production
2013	Ishq Di Booti	Coke Studio Pakistan (season 6)
2014	Allah Hu with Saieen Zahoor	Coke Studio Pakistan (season 6)
2014	Ithy Rakh with Sukshinder Shinda (Album:Collaborations 3)	Moviebox Record Label
2014	Pani Da Bulbula	Coke Studio Pakistan (season 7)
2016	Qaseeda Burda Shareef	Peace Records
2016	Bekarar with Farhan NTF	VIP Records
2017	Facebook Utte, music by DJ Sanj	Moviebox Record Label
2018	Hum Dekhenge (promo song ft. several artists)	Coke Studio Pakistan (season 11)
2018	Mere Rashke Qamar, music by Asif Khan	Moviebox Record Label
2018	Ballay Ballay with Aima Baig	Coke Studio Pakistan (season 11)
2019	Diamond Ring ft. Arbaz Khan	Beyond Records
2019	Rahiya Sohneya	Akhrot Film
2019	Bhabhi with Shipra Goyal and Jaidev Kumar (film: Ishq My Religion)	Gurdeep Dhillon Films
2019	Billo	Coke Studio Pakistan (season 12)
2019	Chamkeeli	Independent Record Label
2020	Paar with Bohemia	Kali Denali Music
2020	Udaasi Ki Raatain – Tribute to Kashmir	Independent Record Label
2021	Sun Lay Tu	Independent Record Label
2021	Bol Qalandar	Independent Record Label
2021	Ho Idhr Bi Nazar E Karam Ya Rasul Allah	Independent Record Label
2021	Begum Shak Karti Hai	Independent Record Label
2022	Punjab Culture Song	Independent Record Label
2022	Imported Hakoomat Song	Independent Record Label
2022	Pardesi Zindabad	UBL Roshan Digital
2022	Hai Haq Hamara Azaadi - PTI Anthem	Independent Record Label
2023	Jail Bharo Tehreek - PTI Anthem	Independent Record Label
2023	Lab Pey Ati Hai	Independent Record Label
2023	Unki Choukhat	Independent Record Label
2023	Unka Mangta	Independent Record Label
2024	Rano From Chandigarh	Independent Record Label
2024	Ishq Rang	Independent Record Label
2024	Bhar Do Jholi	Independent Record Label
2024	Gal Sari Sarkar Di Aye	Independent Record Label
2025	Pak India War Tarana	Independent Record Label
2025	Des Mere	Independent Record Label
2026	Mere Pyare Aaqa	Independent Record Label
2026	Gen Z Rano	Beyond Records

=== Television ===
Year	Program	Role	Channel
2004	Music Show: Star Host	Himself/host	ATV
2015	Ramzan Transmission: Mohabbat Hai Ramzan	Himself/host	A-Plus TV
2016–17	Talk Show: Darja-e-Shararat	Himself/host	Samaa TV

=== TEDx Talks ===
Date	Topic	Venue	Location
2019	Developing Free Healthcare	TEDx Talks – TMUC	Islamabad, Pakistan
2019	Youth in a Nation Building Process	TEDx Talks – Bahria University	Islamabad, Pakistan

== Honours and recognition ==
- Tamgha-e-Imtiaz (Medal of Excellence) received from the President of Pakistan on 23 March 2005, for public service / music / philanthropy.
- Sitara-e-Eisaar received from the President of Pakistan on 30 June 2006, for outstanding humanitarian relief work during the 8 October 2005 devastating earthquake in Pakistan.
- Organization of Islamic Cooperation (OIC) – Appointed Humanitarian Ambassador of the OIC on 11 January 2011.

== Awards ==
Year	Award	Category	Award ceremony	Result
2000	PTV Awards	Folk singer	PTV World	Won
2002	Lux Style Award Best Singer 2002	Best Singer	1st Lux Style Awards	Won
2003	Lux Style Award Best Singer 2003	Best Singer	2nd Lux Style Awards	Won
2004	PTV Awards	Six years consecutive award holder for best pop singer	PTV Home	Won
2018	Lux Style Award Best Dress Male	Best Dress (Male)	17th Lux Style Awards	Won
