= Haroon Shahid =

Pakistani musician and actor

- Born: 29 December 1989 (age 36); Lahore, Punjab, Pakistan
- Occupations: Actor, singer-songwriter
- Years active: 2008–present
- Relatives: Ahad Raza Mir (cousin)
- Musical career
- Genre: Pop-rock
- Instrument: Guitar
- Years active: 2008–present
- Labels: Bisconni Music; Coke Studio
- Formerly of: SYMT (2010–2016)

Haroon Shahid is a Pakistani musician and actor. He was the lead vocalist and rhythm guitarist of the Lahore-based pop-rock band Symt from 2010 to 2016. Later, he concentrated on acting, making his debut in 2017 with Shoaib Mansoor's Verna before doing television series.

== Early life and education ==
Originally from Lahore, Shahid grew up in Saudi Arabia and later did his Bachelors in commerce and his Master's in public policy from the Beaconhouse National University.

He is a first cousin of actor Ahad Raza Mir.

== Career ==
=== Music ===
One of Shahid's first public appearances was with Pakistan Sangeet Icon (PSI), a music competition and reality show televised by MTV Pakistan, held in Karachi in 2008, and while he didn't win he would get noticed. Later he'd be a guitarist and the lead vocalist of the Lahore-based pop-rock band Symt, until its dissolution in 2016. He featured in Coke Studio Pakistan season 5 (2012) with his band Symt while he participated as a solo artist for Coke Studio Pakistan season 9 (2016), singing "Baliye (Laung Gawacha)".

=== Acting ===
Shahid made his acting debut with the Shoaib Mansoor movie Verna in 2017 before doing television roles.

== Filmography ==
=== Film ===
| Year | Film | Role |
|---|---|---|
| 2017 | Verna | Aami |

=== Television series ===
| Year | Film | Role | Singer | Network | Note | Reference |
|---|---|---|---|---|---|---|
| 2018 | Tajdeed e Wafa | Ashar | | Hum TV | Leading role | |
| 2019 | Do Bol | Sameer | | ARY Digital | Supporting role | |
| 2019 | Khaas | Fakhir | | Hum TV | Leading role | |
| 2019 | Meray Dost Meray Yaar (season 1) | Sherry | | Geo Entertainment | Leading role | |
| 2020 | Muqaddar | Saad ur Rahman | | Geo Entertainment | Leading role | |
| 2020 | Tamanna | Haroon | | Geo Entertainment | Leading role | |
| 2020 | Aik Aur Munafiq | | | Geo Entertainment | Episode: "Taqdeer" | |
| 2021 | Qayamat | Jawad | | Geo Entertainment | Leading role | |
| 2021 | Makafaat (season 3) | Multiples | | Geo Entertainment | Episodes: "Khayanat","Marham","Aablay" and "Samaat" | |
| 2021 | Aakhir Kab Tak | Saim | | Hum TV | Leading role | |
| 2021 | Amanat | Junaid | | ARY Digital | Leading role | |
| 2021 | Hum Kahan Ke Sachay Thay | Safwan | | Hum TV | Supporting role | |
| 2021 | Tasveer | Ali | | Play Entertainment | Leading role | |
| 2021 | Fasiq | Umair | | Geo Entertainment | Leading role | |
| 2022 | Yeh Na Thi Hamari Qismat | Yasir | | ARY Digital | Cameo | |
| 2022 | Inaam e Mohabbat | Mair | | Geo Entertainment | Leading role | |
| 2022 | Milan | | | Sab TV | Leading role | |
| 2022 | Tinkay Ka Sahara | Hammad | | Hum TV | Leading role | |
| 2023 | Nikah | | | Geo Entertainment | Leading role | |
| 2024 | Jaan Nisar | Faraz | | Geo Entertainment | Supporting role | |
| 2024 | Dao | Aaliyan | | Geo Entertainment | Leading role | |
| 2024 | Faraar | Faraz Siddiqui | Yes | Green Entertainment | Supporting role; also sung a reprise of Ko Ko Korina (1966) in Episode 10 | |
| 2025 | Humraaz | Faraz | | Geo Entertainment | Supporting role | |
| 2026 | Milkiyat | Rafay | | Geo Entertainment | Supporting role | |
| 2026 | Nashtar | Arbaz | | Geo Entertainment | Supporting role | |
