= Laraib Atta =

Pakistani VFX artist (born c. 1987)

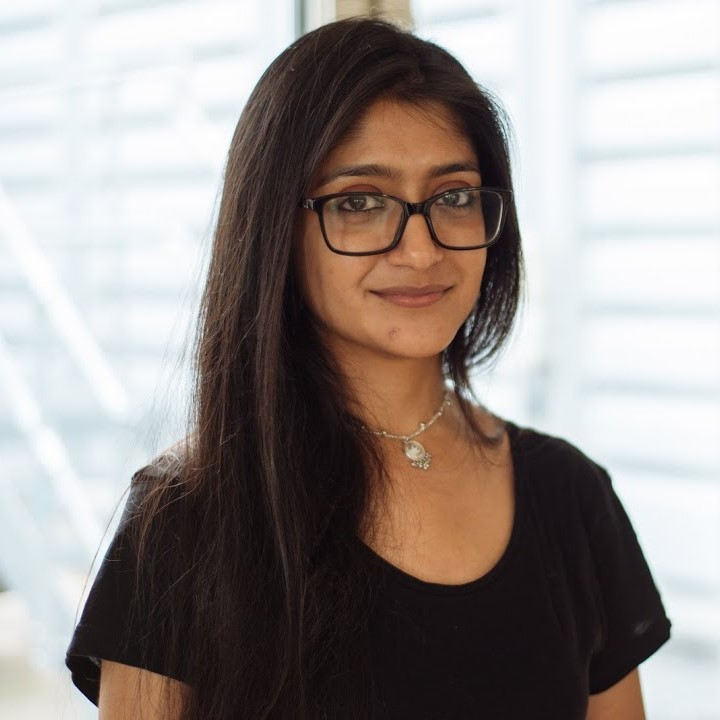
- Born: Laraib Attaullah Khan Esakhelvi; 1987 (age 38–39); Mianwali, Punjab, Pakistan
- Occupations: Visual effects; sound design
- Years active: 2007–present
- Parent(s): Attaullah Khan Esakhelvi; Bazgha
- Family: Sanwal Esakhelvi; Bilawal Atta

Laraib Khan (Note: Urdu: لاریب خان) (born c. 1987) is a Pakistani VFX artist. She has worked for Hollywood films, including 10,000 BC, The Chronicles of Narnia, Prince of Persia, Godzilla and X-Men: Days of Future Past.

== Early life ==
Laraib was born in Mianwali to folk singer Attaullah Khan Esakhelvi and actress Bazgha. She is the younger sister of VFX artist and musician, Sanwal Esakhelvi.

She graduated from Escape Studios, London in 2006.

== Career ==
She worked in different Marvel films and also worked for BBC, Glassworks Barcelona and MPC. Atta has been nominated for awards including Oscars and BAFTA for her work in film, No Time to Die. as well as the Visual Effects Society Award for her work on the Netflix series Altered Carbon.

== Work ==
Year	Film	Role
2007	Sweeney Todd: The Demon Barber of Fleet Street	Visual effects
2008	10,000 BC	Visual effects
2008	The Chronicles of Narnia: Prince Caspian	Visual effects
2009	Triangle	Visual effects
2010	Prince of Persia: The Sands of Time	Visual effects
2010	The Chronicles of Narnia: Voyage of the Dawn Treader	View-d artist
2014	Godzilla	Visual effects
2014	X-Men: Days of Future Past	Visual effects
2018	Mission: Impossible – Fallout	Digital Compositor
2019	Chernobyl	Compositor
2020	Tenet	Digital Artist
2021	WandaVision	Digital Compositor
2021	F9: The Fast Saga	Compositor
2021	No Time to Die	Compositor
2022	Doctor Strange in the Multiverse of Madness	Digital Compositor
2023	Life on Our Planet	Senior Compositor

== Awards ==
=== VES Award ===
Year	Category	Nominated work	Result
2019	Outstanding Compositing in a Photoreal Episode	Altered Carbon	Nominated
