= Verna (film) =

- Theatrical release poster
- Urdu: ورنہ
- Directed by: Shoaib Mansoor
- Written by: Shoaib Mansoor
- Produced by: Shoaib Mansoor
- Starring: Mahira Khan; Haroon Shahid
- Cinematography: Suleman Razzaq; Khizer Idrees
- Edited by: Zohaib Mansoor
- Music by: Shoaib Mansoor; Haroon Shahid
- Production company: Shoman Productions
- Distributed by: Hum Films; Eveready Pictures
- Release date: 17 November 2017 (Worldwide)
- Country: Pakistan
- Language: Urdu
- Budget: Rs. 5 crore (US$180,000)
- Box office: Rs. 9.35 crore (US$330,000)

Verna (transl. Or Else) is a 2017 Pakistani drama film written, directed and produced by Shoaib Mansoor under his Shoman Productions. The film stars Mahira Khan and debutants Haroon Shahid, Zarrar Khan and Naimal Khawar.

Pre-production began in October 2016, and most of the principal photography took place in Islamabad. The film released worldwide on 17 November 2017, and was distributed by Hum Films and Eveready Pictures.

== Plot ==
Verna is a story of a happy couple, Sara and Aami, a disabled man. Sara and Aami were enjoying a great time at the park with Aami's sister, Mahgul. While at the park, a black SUV stops and the men inside the SUV attempt to take Mahgul away. However, to protect her, Sara goes herself. 3 days later, the men drop her off at her house. Sara tells her family she was raped and begs them to tell the police, but they knew nothing will happen and stay silent. Sara tells them that staying silent will not help. The rapist keeps sending gifts to Sara and telling her to leave the disabled man and marry him. Aami takes Sara's situation in the wrong way, and their marriage starts to fall apart. Sara tells Aami to leave her alone for several days. Sara talks to her friend, who is a lawyer. Together, they try to solve this case of getting her justice.

After a sequence of events, Sara calls her rapist and asks to meet him. They get together and eventually, she goes on "a date" with the rapist named Sultan. She finds out from seeing pictures at his house that Sultan is the son of the Governor, who is running for the Prime Minister of Pakistan. The reason for Sara's rape is found out. It flashes back to when the Governor was visiting a school, which blocked several roads, one of which Aami, Sara, and Mahgul were on. They were on their way to the park, but Sara lost her patience and went up to the governor saying, "This is unfair how you are blocking the roads. We aren't your servants." This angered the Governor, which leads to the rape. Using evidence, Sara brings this case to court. However, with the power of dirty politics, Sultan destroys evidence. Sara and her family are threatened and bribed by Sultan's family and his political partners to leave for Dubai or else things will become horrible. Despite the pressure, they decide to stay.

One day, Sara's dad commits suicide in the basement and apologizes to the family, believing he was a disgrace. Sara's mom flees to America. Sara becomes angry of this. This led to Aami and her reuniting after Aami understands what a rape victim has to go through. Sara, Mahgul, and Aami sneak into Sultan's residence. While he is on his boat, Aami swims and hits him with a bat. Sultan goes unconscious and gets dragged to shore to be kidnapped by Sara. They lock him up next to Sara's dad. When Sultan gains consciousness, Sara locks him in a casket. A sequence of events leads to Sultan having no chance to escape. Sara uses Sultan's texts from his phone that he is ashamed of what he did and he flees. Sultan is trapped in the basement till death. Sara finally gets her own justice, even though no one else helped her. Sara and Aami then go on a vacation together happily at the end.

== Cast ==
- Mahira Khan as Sara
- Haroon Shahid as Aami; Sara's husband who is disabled
- Zarrar Khan as Sultan; son of a Governor running for Prime Minister; Sara's rapist
- Naimal Khawar as Mahgul; Aami's sister
- Rasheed Naz as Khanzada
- Salmaan Shaukat as Jamil
- Iram Rehman; a lawyer who is Sara's friend
- Shahnaz Aftab
- Malik Ata Muhammad Khan as Raees
- Tariq Rahim
- Ahsan Farooq
- Shahnawaz Zaidi
- Shahid Mir as Judge
- Shehzad Mir as MNA Khawaja

== Production ==
=== Development and casting ===
Shoaib Mansoor announced the film on 13 October 2016. This is Mansoor's third film, all of them dealt with the social issues regarding women in Pakistan. It is written, directed and produced by him under his Shoman Productions, "this film has been written and directed by a man of Pakistan for the men of the world to listen to women. It is to encourage women to speak up. Khuda kay liye bol verna…" Hum Films came on board as a distributor. Hum Network's president Sultana Siddiqui said, "We at HUM are very happy to have signed up as distributors for Shoaib Mansoor's film Verna [... His] films are commercial but at the same time focus on topics that carry a strong message."

It was also announced that Mahira Khan had been cast in the leading role, having the second collaboration with Mansoor. She told that Mansoor called just like he had called for her debut film Bol (2011), wondering if she would be interested. She said, "I was just happy to hear from him after so long. ... I think the whole journey now would be very very different." In February 2017, Haroon Shahid revealed to DAWN Images that he will be making his film debut, and has been cast as Khan's co-star in a lead role. Zarrar Khan revealed to The News in June 2017 that he will play the role of an antagonist.

=== Filming ===
It was planned to shoot some scenes in northern areas of Pakistan and some in European countries, but due to a lot of cost-cutting the entire film was shot in Islamabad and surroundings. Salman Razzak was chosen as a cinematographer, but after the first spell of filming he left to be replaced by Khizer Idrees.

=== Promotion ===
Film's poster was revealed by Mahira Khan on 1 September 2017 through her social media platforms. The logo on poster had seven hidden messages on it, and according to MangoBaaz they were:

- Aabroo (Pride/Honor)
- Zehr-e-Hussn
- Ismat (Purity)
- Takabbur (Pride)
- Izzat (Respect)
- Umeed (Hope)
- A woman's silhouette on the 'R'

In an interview with Deutsche Welle, Mansoor said that Murder of Shahzeb Khan inspired him to make this film, although with a different story. "Due to this incident, I was able to show in the film that how the illicit power is used in Pakistan against the public. I added rape in the story because it is the most common form of power against women. Like many other people, I also think that rape is actually showing power, not just a sexual lust."

== Soundtrack ==
Verna

Soundtrack album by various artists
- Released: 23 October 2017
- Recorded: 2016–17
- Genre: Feature film soundtrack
- Length: 17:39
- Label: Patari.pk
- Producer: Shoaib Mansoor

Shoman Productions chronology
Bol (2011)	Verna (2017)

Singles from Verna
- 1. "Power Di Game" Released: 8 November 2017; 2. "Zinda" Released: 20 November 2017

In February 2017, Mahira Khan said in an interview with DNA India that the director "wants me to sing in" the film, "but I can't!" Film's co-star Haroon Shahid too revealed that he has worked with Mansoor "on the composition of a couple of songs". The soundtrack album was released on 23 October 2017 via online music platform Patari.pk.

On 8 November, music video for "Power Di Game" was released, featuring Xpolymer Dar; for which he said, "We worked on the song together. I initially wrote the song and then Shoaib modified it." Another music video for Soch - the band's original "Zinda", self-written and composed, was released on 22 November.

All lyrics are written by Shoaib Mansoor.

No.	Title	Music	Singer(s)	Length
1.	"Ashko"	Gulraj Singh	Zaain Ul Abideen	3:06
2.	"Khushi Ki Baat"	Shoaib Mansoor	Richie Robinson & Zeb Bangash	2:32
3.	"Lafzon Main Kharabi Thi"	Baqir Abbas & Shoaib Mansoor	Shuja Haider, Aima Baig & Riaz Qadri	3:16
4.	"Power Di Game"	Asad Ali Khan	Xpolymer Dar	1:41
5.	"Sambhal Sambhal Kay"	Shoaib Mansoor & Haroon Shahid	Shoaib Mansoor, Zeb Bangash & Haroon Shahid	3:23
6.	"Zinda"	Soch - the band	Soch - the band	3:42
Total length:				17:39

== Release ==
Earlier, it was announced that the film had been slated for a release on the festival of Eid al-Fitr, June 2017. But after completing the filming, it was confirmed that it has been scheduled for a worldwide release on 17 November 2017.

=== Box office ===
Verna opened nationwide with grossing Rs. 68 lakh, collecting Rs. 2.7 crore in its first weekend, and making the total of Rs. 4 crore in its first week.Per approximate figures given as of 6 December, the film has grossed Rs. 4 crore from overseas market, and Rs. 5.35 crore in Pakistan, for a total of more than Rs. 9.35 crore worldwide.

== Accolades ==
Ceremony	Category	Recipient	Result	Ref.
17th Lux Style Awards	Best Film	Shoaib Mansoor	Nominated	
17th Lux Style Awards	Best Director	Shoaib Mansoor	Nominated	
17th Lux Style Awards	Best Actress	Mahira Khan	Won	
17th Lux Style Awards	Best Male Singer	Haroon Shahid – "Sambhal Sambhal Kay"	Nominated	
Pakistan International Film Festival (PIFF)	Best Actress	Mahira Khan	Won	
Pakistan International Film Festival (PIFF)	Best Male Debut	Haroon Shahid	Won	
2nd International Pakistan Prestige Awards (IPPA)	Best Film	Shoaib Mansoor	Nominated	
2nd International Pakistan Prestige Awards (IPPA)	Best Director	Shoaib Mansoor	Nominated	
2nd International Pakistan Prestige Awards (IPPA)	Best Actor	Zarrar Khan	Nominated	
2nd International Pakistan Prestige Awards (IPPA)	Best Actress	Mahira Khan	Nominated	
2nd International Pakistan Prestige Awards (IPPA)	Best Actor in a Supporting Role	Haroon Shahid	Nominated	
4th Galaxy Lollywood Awards	Best Performance in a Negative Role	Zarrar Khan	Won	
4th Galaxy Lollywood Awards	Best Actor in a Leading Role Female	Mahira Khan	Nominated	
4th Galaxy Lollywood Awards	Best Male Debut	Haroon Shahid	Nominated	
4th Galaxy Lollywood Awards	Best Playback Singer Female	Zeb Bangash – "Sambhal Sambhal Kay"	Nominated	
4th Galaxy Lollywood Awards	Cinematic Moment of the Year	Final Scene	Nominated	
6th Hum Awards	Recognition Award	Mahira Khan	Won	
8th Hum Style Awards	Best Actress (Film)	Mahira Khan	Nominated	
Pakistan Film Festival, New York	Official Selection		Selected	

== Criticism and controversy ==
=== Censorship ===
On 14 November, the Central Board of Film Censors stated, "The general plot of the movie revolves around rape, which we consider to be unacceptable." They said the film would be permanently banned, if the filmmakers did not claim. The Lahore and Karachi premieres were also cancelled officially. This caused an outcry from women's rights campaigners which spread via social media such as Twitter. Gulalai Ismail, human rights activist and founder of Aware Girls stated, "rape is a rampant issue in Pakistan […] movies like Verna are crucial in moving society forward." On 15 November, Marriyum Aurangzeb ensured the film release, saying it is pending for a full board review.

On 17 November, the film cleared the censor boards and released as per schedule without any censors. It was rated adult film in Sindh, while it was given universal audience certificate in Punjab. In the US and UK, it was rated 15+.

=== Critical reception ===
Writing for MangoBaaz, Haadia Paracha said, "Verna had all the makings of another Shoaib Mansoor masterpiece. The director’s reputation precedes him, what with his stellar track record of producing films with actual substance like “Khuda Ke Liye” and “Bol“, often playing with uncomfortable yet progressive themes. This product, however, fell short of its promise."

For The Express Tribune, Rahul Aijaz rated 2 out of 5 stars and referred the film as plastic ship that "was bound to sink". He added it "could've been the flagbearer of women's rights and social change but ends up a mere hologram." Shafiq Ul Hasan said, "There are times when a plot is very powerful" and "has the ability to sell itself on paper". But he too rated 2 stars out of 5, saying that it "seems to have failed" the "real test" that how a film "is presented to the audience". Hamna Zubair of DAWN Images said, "The film message is lost in more subtle failures too," adding that the film might "end up doing the opposite of what it intended - that is - to depict rape as a terrible crime." For The News International, Aijaz Gul praised the film throughout, saying "With powerful direction, impressive performance" by the cast, "good use of Islamabad locations", "brilliant camera work, sound, and soothing production effects," it "can be compared with any top" English film. Aamna Haider Isani noted, "It's gripping story-telling", but the "plot is riddled with loopholes and some of the dialogues are just as weak."

For Daily Times, Fouzia Saeed praised it, "Through its dialogue, the film does a public service by educating the whole nation on how to report a rape," but reminded that some faults are to be answered by the filmmakers. Ally Adnan said, "It is poorly written, horribly directed, shoddily shot, sloppily acted, incompetently dubbed, and clumsily edited". Yaqoob Khan Bangash said that the film should have led all of us to take any kind of sexual violence seriously, "However, it ended up only highlighting the issue and then promoted entrapment, lies, and vigilante justice." For The Nation, Nida Tahseen said that this film wouldn't bag much appreciation, noting the reasons as "poor dialogues, bad locations" and "below average performances". Marryam Suleman said that "the direction, the dialogues, the technicalities and the unrealistic end of the movie" showed failure, however, between "a lot of loopholes," there are the "moments of sheer effulgence too."

Khurram Sohail of Dawn News praised the actors, but commented as per the sensitivity of the overall topic, actors failed to express their influence. Dr Dushka H Saiyid of Youlin Magazine praised the film and its cast, and said, "Having built up the film to an exciting crescendo, the end was a little fanciful". For Dunya News, Tehreem Azeem wrote that the director haven't done justice to the story, while trying to highlight many social issues, he couldn't told any of them completely. Maleeha Mengal too praised all the cast, but said, "The story line could have been simplified, but instead it went a bit too far from the basics, leaving the viewer confused." Omair Alavi also praised their acting, but rated 1 out of 5 stars; he wrote to Samaa TV, "the film has more negatives than positives". According to Mehr Tarar, the film is "well-made, well-directed, well-acted and well-written" with the exception of a few structural flaws, contrary to some critical reviews. Fifi Haroon wrote to The Wire that "as a manifesto for women's rights" the film "may well have hit its mark." Sadaf Haider commented that the storyline has "a few plot holes and some convenient leaps of faith", but overall it has "a strong message that is not to be missed."

=== Mahira Khan's disclaimer ===
On 23 November, Mahira Khan tweeted, "The disclaimer before Verna starts […] Everything in the film is imaginary. Imaginary because reality is too bitter to be told or shown." This also caused her to be backlashed by the public, however, she maintained the silence.

== See also ==
- List of Pakistani films of 2017
