= Chupan Chupai =

- Film poster
- Urdu: چھپن چھپائی
- Directed by: Mohsin Ali
- Written by: Mohsin Ali; Zeeshan Haider
- Produced by: Ray Khan; Zayed Sheikh
- Starring: Ahsan Khan; Neelam Muneer; Ali Rizvi
- Edited by: Ehtesham Khan; Waqas Ali Khan; Faheem Ahmed; Salman Tehzeeb
- Music by: Soch - the Band
- Production company: Huzu Productions
- Distributed by: Hum Films
- Release date: 29 December 2017 (Pakistan)
- Country: Pakistan
- Language: Urdu
- Budget: Rs. 4 crore (US$140,000)
- Box office: Rs. 7 crore (US$250,000) (Worldwide)

Chupan Chupai (Urdu: چھپن چھپائی, lit. 'Hide and Seek') is a 2017 Pakistani comedy thriller film, directed by Mohsin Ali. The film stars Ahsan Khan, Neelam Muneer and Ali Rizvi in the lead cast. It released on 29 December 2017 under the banner of Huzu Productions, and was distributed by Hum Films. The film received generally positive reviews from critics and audience, however, the film only grossed 7.00 crore against its 4.00 crore budget.

Chupan Chupai is an unofficial remake of the 2013 Indian Tamil language film Soodhu Kavvum.

== Plot ==
The film is about a comedy of trios revolving around three friends Feddy, Koki and Teli, stupid by nature and cursed by luck. Their lives take a chilling turn when they cross paths with Babu (Ahsan Khan) and his imaginary girlfriend, Pari. Together they knit a smart kidnapping plan to abduct someone wealthy and demand a huge ransom. This takes an unexpected turn when the son of a Minister ends up in their custody and the task to find the kidnappers is given to encounter specialist, Chaudhry. Babu and his gang try to stay ahead of the cop, leading from one comic situation to another.

== Cast ==
- Zayed Sheikh as Feddy
- Vajdaan Shah as Teeli
- Ali Rizvi as Koki
- Ahsan Khan as Babu
- Neelam Muneer as Pari
- Faizan Khawaja as Babar Durrani (Bobby)
- Sakina Samo as Babar's mother
- Talat Hussain as Ijaz Durrani
- Adnan Jaffar as Chaudhry (Policeman)
- Rehan Sheikh as Khan
- Javed Sheikh (special appearance)

== Production ==
Chupan Chupai is directed by Mohsin Ali and it is his directorial debut. The cast of the film includes Ahsan Khan and Neelam Muneer in lead roles, alongside Ali Rizvi, Rehan Sheikh, Talat Hussain, Adnan Jaffar, Faizan Khawaja, Sakina Samo and Javed Sheikh in supporting roles. The film is the debut of the actresses Muneer and Samo. In an interview, Ahsan Khan said, "I read three different scripts before coming across and committing to Chupan Chupai. I enjoyed reading the script so much that i was sure I'd enjoy making the movie". Principal photography began in February 2016. The film cinematographer came from the United States to join the project. The studio for the film is Huzu Productions.

== Soundtrack ==
Chupan Chupai

Soundtrack album by various artists
- Released: 8 December 2017
- Recorded: 2016
- Genre: Soundtrack
- Length: 13:25
- Label: Hum Films
- Producer: Soch - the Band

The film soundtrack album was released by Hum Films on 8 December 2017.

All music is composed by Soch - the Band.

No.	Title	Lyrics	Singer(s)	Length
1.	"5 Choohay"		Asrar	2:40
2.	"Befikray"	Adnan Dhool	Adnan Dhool	3:23
3.	"Jhoom Jhoom"		Adnan Dhool	3:51
4.	"Sadqa"	Adnan Dhool	Adnan Dhool, Aima Baig	3:30
Total length:				13:25

== Release ==
The trailer for the film was released on 23 November 2017. The film released across Pakistan on 29 December 2017.

=== Box office ===
The film grossed Rs. 45 lakh on its opening day, made up to Rs. 1.4 crore in the first weekend, and collected about Rs. 2.3 crore in its first week. The film was declared a hit at the box office. According to The News International, Chupan Chupai has done a business of Rs. 7 crore in 25 days.

== Critical reception ==
Chupan Chupai had a premiere event in Karachi on Thursday, 28 December 2017, and it opened to mostly good reviews. Rahul Aijaz of The Express Tribune rated 3.25 stars out of 5 and he too praised it, "even with its loopholes, it has more than enough to keep you engaged (mostly hysterically laughing) and busy with several twists and turns." Mehreen Hasan of DAWN Images said, "These are minor gripes for an otherwise solid script that combined with powerful performances and cinematography made for a fun experience." Mohammad Kamran Jawaid of DAWN said that while "the screenplay and dialogue are all copy-pasted" from Soodhu Kavvum, a "good chunk of it is engaging within the bounds of mediocrity." Maria Shirazi of The News International also praised it, "A film only works if all elements come together in unison. Fortunately, Chupan Chupai gets many, if not all, elements right."

Manal Faheem Khan of Something Haute rated 4 out of 5 stars and praised, "We can't say what our favourite aspect of the film is, simply because there are so many." Arsalan Ali rated 3.5 stars out of 5, and wrote to website behtareen.pk that "Obviously, there are flaws," but "To his credit, director Mohsin Ali has done a fine job and proved that qualification does make a difference." Omair Alavi rated 3.5 stars out of 5; he along with Syeda Sarah Hasan of Samaa TV, Malika Khan of Geo News and Zahra Khan of Dunya News referred it as "a breath of fresh air" for the Pakistani cinema. Zaheer Ahmed of Samaa TV rated 2.5 stars out of 5 and praised the leading cast, while said that this movie could have been better, adding that a film would be successful if more focus is given to it to make people happy. Noor Ul Ain of Youlin Magazine noted, "All in all, the good, bad, ugly, entertaining are all parts played by men, while the women in Mohsin Ali's world are either silenced or sidelined, if not entirely excluded."

== Accolades ==
Ceremony	Won	Nominated
17th Lux Style Awards	Aima Baig – Best Female Singer for "Sadqa"	Mohsin Ali – Best Film; Ahsan Khan – Best Actor; Neelum Muneer – Best Actress; Mohsin Ali – Best Director; Ali Rizvi – Best Supporting Actor; Faizan Khawaja – Best Supporting Actor; Adnan Dhool – Best Male Singer for "Sadqa"
Pakistan International Film Festival	Adnan Dhool – Best Music	
4th Galaxy Lollywood Awards		Ahsan Khan – Best Actor in a Leading Role Male; Faizan Khawaja – Best Actor in a Supporting Role Male; Ali Rizvi – Best Performance in a Comic Role; Neelum Muneer – Best Female Debut; Adnan Dhool – Best Playback Singer Male for "Sadqa"; Ahsan Khan and Neelam Muneer – Best On-Screen Couple

== See also ==
- List of Pakistani films of 2017
- List of Pakistani dramas
- Aima Baig discography
