= Bisconni Music =

Pakistani television music show

- Directed by: Saad Hayat
- Country of origin: Pakistan
- No. of seasons: 2
- No. of episodes: 4

Production
- Executive producer: Ismail Industries Limited
- Production location: Karachi

Original release
- Network: YouTube (Online); Broadcast syndication (Television); Broadcast syndication (Radio)
- Release: 1 January 2021

Bisconni Music is a Pakistani music television show featuring live studio-recorded music performances by musicians from across Pakistan. The show is first of its kind by a local company Bisconni. Directed by music producer Saad Hayat, the show debuted on 1 January 2021. The season 2 was produced by Raafay Israr.

== Artists ==
The show features a diverse line-up of musicians from across Pakistan, including:

- Ahmed Jahanzeb
- Shuja Haider
- Natasha Baig
- Sajid and Zeeshan
- Ustad Ashiq Ali Chand
- Mughal-e-Funk
- Haroon Shahid
- Ali Khan
- Mirage
- Taha Hussain
- Natasha Humera Ejaz
- Ali Tarik
- Sinnan Fazwani
- Nimra Rafiq
- Alycia Dias
- Mahnoor Altaf
- Saad Hayat

== See also ==
- Music of Pakistan
- Coke Studio
- Nescafé Basement
- Velo Sound Station
- Uth Records
