= Nara Sada Ishq Aye =

Studio album by Abrar-ul-Haq
- Released: March 2007
- Genres: Bhangra; Pop

Abrar-ul-Haq chronology
Nachan Main Audhay Naal (2004)	Nara Sada Ishq Aye (2007)	Sab Rang Aap (PBUH) Se (2013)

Nara Sada Ishq Aye is the seventh, and to date the latest, album of Pakistani pop and bhangra singer Abrar-ul-Haq. It was released in March 2007.

The song "Parveen" from this album became a subject of controversy when the Supreme Court of Pakistan summoned an explanation from Abrar-ul-Haq, alleging that it used the name Parveen in a derogatory manner that would hurt the sentiments of society. Abrar-ul-Haq told reporters the song referred to "Parmeen"; the song title "Permeen" is shown on versions of the album.

== Track listing ==
1. "Rano Khiza Mix" (feat. Cheshire Cat)
2. "Parveen" (Alternative title: "Permeen")
3. "Jatt"
4. "Naraa Sada Ishq Aey"
5. "Saanso Mein"
6. "Patlo"
7. "Run Babay Di"
8. "Mela"
9. "Maan"
10. "Alif Allah"

== Awards and nominations ==
Nominated for Best Album of the Year at the 7th Lux Style Awards held in 2008.
