= Coke Studio Explorer =

Pakistani web television music series

- جستجوگر کوک اسٹوڈیو
- Created by: Ali Hamza; Zohaib Kazi
- Directed by: Ali Hamza; Zohaib Kazi
- Country of origin: Pakistan
- Original languages: Urdu; English
- No. of seasons: 1
- No. of episodes: 5 (list of episodes)

Production
- Producers: Ali Hamza; Zohaib Kazi
- Production locations: Lahore, Punjab; Kalasha Valley, Chitral; Muzaffarabad, Kashmir; Sohbatpur, Balochistan; Deewan Lal Chand, Sindh
- Cinematography: Insiya Syed; Videography: Osman Rafique
- Editors: Insiya Syed; Video editor: Bilal Sagar
- Running time: 3 – 4 minutes
- Production company: Front Foot Media

Original release
- Network: YouTube
- Release: July 3 – July 11, 2018

Related
- Coke Studio Pakistan season 11

Coke Studio Explorer is a Pakistani web television music series created by musicians Ali Hamza and Zohaib Kazi. As a part of new module, it is a spin-off to a Coke Studio Pakistan and prequel to its eleventh season. Instead of studio recording settings from its original format, the series follows the live music collaborations of Kazi and Hamza with regional but largely unknown artists discovered by the duo in five regions of Pakistan. It began airing on Coke Studio Pakistan's official YouTube and Facebook channels on 3 July 2018, concluding with five episodes on 11 July 2018.

The series has received largely positive reviews from critics, with particular praise having been given for its new module, production values, concept and performances.

== Artists ==
Producers Zohaib Kazi and Ali Hamza, traveled across the five regions of Pakistan to collaborate with following musicians for the series:

- Ariana and Amrina:
  Both Amrina and Ariana, whose birth name was Farsi Gul and who changed it to her current name after American singer Ariana Grande are members of the Kalash community residing in Bumburet Valley of Chitral. Both have been singing together locally since the age of five.
- Shamu Bai and Vishnu:
  This brother and sister duo were classically trained by their father Arjun and hail from Deewan Lal Chand a village in rural Sindh. They are famous for their bhajans at local jagrans and have also performed at local gatherings, weddings and festivals.
- Mangal Khan, Darehan Khan Maula Baksh and Shayan Maula Baksh:
  Known as "Baloch Throat Musicians", Mangal Khan together with Darehan and Shyan hails from Dera Bugti District in Balochistan. One of few singers who have been performing using throat singing technique called "overtone singing" (in Balochi known as "Nar-sur") for over thirty-years. Kazi compared their music to Tuvan singing of Mongolian monks.
- Mishal Khawaja:
  Born in Pakistan and raised in Toronto, Mishal Khawaja hails from Lahore. Mishal begin her career with covers and released her first original single digitally in 2015 titled "Murder" which was then followed by "Do You Feel it" and "Vertigo". She was discovered by Kazi and Hamza, after they saw her work on Instagram. On her singing Kazi said, "she has a unique, refreshing take on urban music and sings with a lot of passion."
- Qasamir:
  Band of four musicians led by Altaf Mir with Ghulam Mohammad Daar, Manzoor Ahmed Khan, Saifuddin Shah hails from Muzaffarabad. Mir is a master craftsman and together with Ghulam Muhammad has worked for Radio Pakistan for forty-years, while Manzoor is a rickshaw driver and Saifuddin is a professional chef. Together they known form a band Qasamir (to resonate with Kashmir).

== Episodes ==
No. overall	Song Title	Artist(s)	Lyricist(s)	Language	Original release date
1	"Pareek"	Ariana & Amrina	Traditional	Kalsaha	July 3, 2018
The song was recorded and filmed in Bumburet Valley, Kalash, Chitral; Pakistan
2	"Faqeera"	Shamu Bai & Vishnu	Baba Bulleh Shah	Sindhi	July 5, 2010
The song was recorded and filmed in Deewan Lal Chand, Sindh; Pakistan
3	"Naseebaya"	Darehan, Shayan & Mangal	Traditional	Balochi	July 7, 2010
The song was recorded and filmed in Sohbatpur, Balochistan, Pakistan, and features the traditional Balochi musical practice of Nar Sur.
4	"Tere Bin Soona"	Mishal Khawaja	Mishal Khawaja	Urdu	July 9, 2010
The song was recorded and filmed in Lahore, Punjab; Pakistan
5	"Ha Gulo"	Qasamir	Traditional	Kashmiri	July 11, 2010
The song was recorded and filmed in Muzaffarabad, Azad Kashmir; Pakistan

== Production ==
=== Concept and development ===
"Coke Studio Explorer is a story of people and resilience. It sparks the broader conversation of diversity and language. The program is centered around a number of hugely talented and driven musicians whose songs will do Pakistan proud. It is driven by our desire to help put the genre of folk amalgamated with the urban sounds of the country, on an international landscape. We travelled across the country with our laptops and mobile recording system, in the hope to truly capture the essence and spirit of music across the country. It was important to record each artist in their own spaces; where they were most at ease. With Coke Studio Explorer, we hope to discover, archive and narrate these songs and stories in an urbanized 2018 soundscape.
– Ali Hamza and Zohaib Kazi, Coca-Cola Journey.

In March 2018, Coca-Cola Pakistan announced Ali Hamza and Zohaib Kazi would helm eleventh season of Coke Studio as a producers and directors, after Bilal Maqsood and Faisal Kapadia of Strings left the show to continue their own music.

Speaking of their collaboration Zohaib said, "we met on a bench in a park; it was Alhamra Park bench in Lahore. That's how it began. And when you know what the end will be, things become easy. And things fall into place." The pair met in August 2017 and after two months they outlined the structure for the show, in an interview with Arab News Hamza said, "we sat down to talk very specifically about this opportunity and it was amazing! In a matter of 10 to 15 minutes we were so triggered, so driven-I truly felt I had known Zohaib for a long time." Detailing further he said, "a common theme in a lot of our conversations was that Pakistan and Pakistanis are going through a bit of an identity crisis; one of the primary discussions we had was, 'what do we do after ten years?' We had to innovate. It was very important for us to recognize and acknowledge the countercultures that exist around us; these are the people who give our identity depth. Coke Studio has the reach to allow us to get to know these cultures more intimately and to amplify their colors." It was not until 8 March 2018 when the duo were announced as a new producers for the series and as a part of new module, Coke Studio Explorer was revealed at the end of June 2018; in an interview Hamza said, "we wanted to focus on things that we hadn't ever explored before, and to look at elements of what makes Pakistan what it is today-highlighting the Pakistani identity and truly owning the white in our flag." On the idea of series Kazi said, "the thing that was established in the first ten minutes was how we were going to end this because once you establish the end, automatically your goals are established and a plan emerges."

On explaining the creation behind Coke Studio Explorer Zohaib said, "we felt that CS had to spread its wings and throw a larger net across the country, to not just attract the urban pool, but the rural pool as well. At the end of the day, the regions and its people collectively make Pakistan. It was important for us to explore this vision in depth." Adding to the new format of the show Hamza said, "we've learned a lot from both the producer's (Rohail Hyatt, Strings) tenures. Both had their positives, but by the end, we know there's always going to be margin for more. We didn't look at it as individuals, but across 10 years of CS rather than the journey of Rohail Hayat or Strings. We were very clear that we weren't going to put our journeys into it either, but focus objectively on the platform after this decade." Kazi also chipped, "after ten years, we felt that Coke Studio needed to innovate and search for talent wider and deeper than it had in the past. As producers, that is what we tried to do with Coke Studio Explorer. More importantly, we tried to construct a module that will bring people together. We are in an election year and the political climate of the country is both charged and polarised. We hope that Coke Studio Explorer will help add some love and amity to the atmosphere and bring people together, using the tremendous power of music."

The general manager of Coca-Cola Pakistan and Afghanistan, Rizwan U. Khan explained, "Coke Studio Explorer is an [sic] unique manner of exploring the vast talent of our country. In addition "Coke Studio" has a legacy which has embraced and promoted Pakistan's rich, vibrant and diverse culture. That has helped shaped a new narrative within and externally." He further stated that "Coke Studio Explorer has been created as a natural and progressive chapter to the continuing legacy of Coke Studio.

=== Explorer recording and artists ===
The duo travelled extensively in the northern region of Pakistan, Sindh and Punjab to discover the regional but relatively unknown artists of their respective regions. In an interview duo said, "we established the criteria for selection before embarking on our search for musicians. The musicians had to be relatively unknown. They had to represent a unique aspect of the culture, history and spirit of Pakistan. And, they had to be talented. The selections were made in the field-in a natural, freewheeling and largely unrestrained manner – using the criteria that had been established in the beginning." According to Kazi search for such artists was "both extensive and expansive" and together they covered four provinces of Pakistan bringing five artists to the platform. The duo developed a special mobile recording system for the on-location recordings and while additional tracks and engineering was completed in studio.

The Explorer series featured five set of musicians from five regions of Pakistan, all of whom were unknown but popular in their native regions. In Bumburet Valley of Kalash the duo collaborated with Ariana (Farsi Gul) and Amrina, explaining about their collaboration Kazi said, "it's not every day that you come across two girls whose vocals scale as high as the cultural peaks of the Kalash Valleys. Ariana and Amrina are true personification of this traditional musical journey. They may be 4,000 but there chants make them sound like Four Hundred Thousand!". in Deewan Lal Chand village of Sindh, the brother-sister Vishnu and Shamu Bai famous for their bhajans were made part of, while in Sohbatpur District, throat-singers Mangal, Darehan and Shayan (now Bloach Throat singers) known for their singing technique "Naur-Sur" made their debuts, and from Muzaffarabad, Azad Kashmir a band of four musicians titled, Qasamir led by Altaf Mir with Ghulam Mohammad Daar, Manzoor Ahmed Khan, Saifuddin Shah performed. The duo wanted to record the song in the mountains of Muzaffarabad but because of the rain they had to shoot indoors and then they recorded the video outside later. They couldn't wait for the rain as both Explorer and season eleven were shot back-to-back at Coke Studio production house in Karachi. The fifth and final artist Mishal Khawaja a Pakistani born-Canadian singer was discovered through her Instagram covers by Kazi. The duso said, "we are big fans of original song writing, when we found her we didn't want to give her someone else's song and we didn't want to compose for her because then it'd become our expression. We wanted thi to remain about the artist, we wanted this to be about her."

== Reception ==
The series has received largely positive reviews from critics, with particular praise given to its new module, diversity, performances and Coke Studio efforts in showcasing and bringing the indigenous art form of Pakistan to the mainstream media. Television critic Shaheer Anwar of The Express Tribune said, "the duo promised to bring a new flavour to the traditional Coke Studio and seem to have accomplished their goal so far by introducing Coke Studio Explorer. This is what many are calling a bonus to the upcoming season that aims to discover musical talent from all across Pakistan." Actor turned musician Arshad Mehmood said, "the new season of Coke Studio comes with a message of love, unity, passion and pride that is exceedingly relevant to the current times. It should be heard, savoured and celebrated." Forbes contributor journalist, Sony Rehman from Lahore marked, "Coke Studio's previous seasons have dealt with its fair share of criticism and mixed reactions over certain song selections and collaborations, gauging by Coke Studio Explorer, it may just hit all the right notes this year."

The first episode garnered widespread critical acclaim, the team efforts were praised for bringing the culture of people of Kalash and highlighting their traditions. Shot in rural Sindh, second episode also received critical acclaim, where critics praised the duo for keeping the recording true to its origin. The third episode landscaped the rare form of traditional Balochi singing and like its predecessors the episode received critical acclaim for showcasing the indigenous culture and tradition. Fourth episode featured Canadian born Pakistani singer who was discovered by Kazi through her Instagram videos, the reviews for both song and episode was largely positive. The fifth and final episode opened to rave reviews, Shams Irfan of Kashmir Life wrote, "the producers have deliberately attempted making it sort of nostalgic by getting back in Kashmir's time wrap-though not in this part of Kashmir-when the Vale was all about beauty and romance.
