= Sounds of Kolachi =

Pakistani musical ensemble

Sounds of Kolachi (Urdu: سونڈس اف کولاچی), also spelled Sounds-of Ko Laa Chi, is a musical ensemble from Karachi. Sounds of Kolachi is a 10-piece group of vocalists and instrumentalists which blends raga and Western harmony, counterpoint and South Asian genres. The group uses South Asian classical instruments like the sitar and bowed sarangi, as well as electric guitar and a rock rhythm section. Ahsan Bari is the group's composer. Sounds of Kolachi has a quartet of male and female voices.

== Discography ==
=== Album - Elhaam ===
- Chakardar
- Lakh Jatan
- Man Mora
- Allah He Dey Ga
- Aey Ri Sakhi
- Nain Lagay Ray
- Tarana
- Yaar Mileya

=== Coke Studio 11 ===
Ilallah (Coke Studio 11) - 2018

== Awards and nominations ==
Year	Nominee / work	Award	Result
Lux Style Awards
2018	Elhaam	Album of the Year	Nominated
