= Attaullah Khan Esakhelvi =

Pakistani folk musician (born 1951)

Attaullah Khan Esakhelvi SI PP
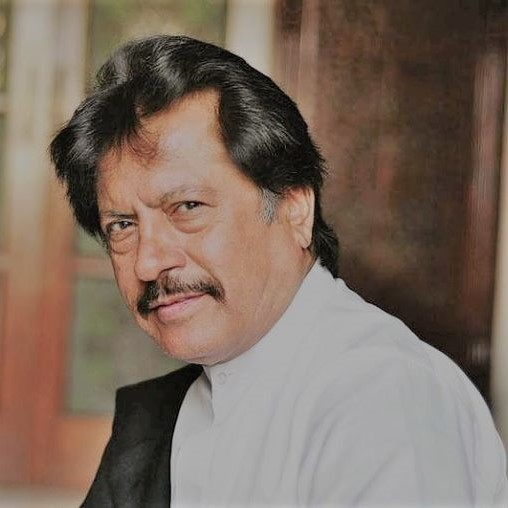
- Photograph of Esakhelvi

Background information
- Born: Attaullah Khan Niazi; 19 August 1951 (age 75); Isakhel, Mianwali, Punjab, Pakistan
- Origin: Punjab, Pakistan
- Genres: Folk music; Ghazal; Playback singing; Film
- Occupations: Playback Singer; actor; composer; poet
- Years active: 1971 – present
- Spouse: Bazgha (m. 1985)
- Children: Laraib Atta; Sanwal Esakhelvi; Bilawal Atta

Attaullah Khan Niazi (Note: عطااللہ خان نیازی) SI PP (born 19 August 1951), known professionally as Attaullah Khan Esakhelvi, (Note: (pronounced [əˈt̪aːʊˈlaː xaːn iːsaːxeːl]), also known as Lala ([laːlaː]), (Note: "Elder brother" in Punjabi, Saraiki, and Pashto)) is a Pakistani musician, singer, poet, and occasional actor from Isakhel in Mianwali District, Punjab. He is mainly associated with the folk music of Punjab and has written various songs and poems in the Saraiki language.

In 2011, he appeared on Coke Studio (season 4) and sang the songs "Ni Oothaan Waale", and "Pyaar Naal".

In September 2017, he appeared again in Coke Studio (season 10) and sang "Sab Maya Hai" with his traditional band.

== Early life ==
Esakhelvi was born on 19 August 1951 in Isakhel, in the Mianwali District of West Punjab province of the Dominion of Pakistan (now in Punjab, Pakistan) into a Saraiki-speaking Niazi Pashtun family. The Thali dialect is spoken in his family. Attaullah developed an interest in music as a child, but it was strictly forbidden in his home. Despite the restrictions on music in his home, Attaullah secretly sought to learn more about it. His school teacher made him practice the songs by Mohammed Rafi and Mukesh and told him never to stop singing. Attaullah tried to explain his passion for music to his parents and convince them to let him sing, but they forbade him to continue singing. Disillusioned, Attaullah left home when he was 18 years old. He travelled extensively within Pakistan and supported himself by working from Mianwali. He is most popular in rural areas of Pakistan and many other countries in the world.

== Musical career ==
Esakhelvi continued his training after leaving his parents' home and often recorded himself on cassette tapes that he later distributed.

In 1972, Esakhelvi was invited to perform on Radio Pakistan, Bahawalpur. That same year, he performed in a concert in Mianwali. Esakhelvi performed on the Pakistan Television (PTV) show Neelam Ghar in 1973.

He was invited by a company in Faisalabad to record folk songs in their studio, and he recorded four albums in one recording session. The albums were released at the end of 1977 and became national bestsellers.

In 1980, Esakhelvi performed in the United Kingdom for the first time. It was also his first concert abroad. His albums were eventually released in the UK under various labels, including Hi-Tech, OSA, and Moviebox.

He has performed Na`at and Kalaam by famous Sufi poets, such as Mian Muhammad Bakhsh's "Saiful Maluk" and Bulleh Shah's "Keey Bay Dardan Sang Yaree". He also sang the songs written by S M Sadiq, a famous lyricist in Punjabi, Urdu, and Hindi. Attaullah Khan visited India in 2014. The Times of India wrote: "A Sufi concert, Ibaadat, organized in association with the Navbharat Times, was recently held at Purana Quila in the capital. Pakistani folk singer Attaullah Khan performed for the first time in Delhi at this event. Khan sang his "Achha Sila Diya Tune Mere Pyaar Ka" and other Pakistani Sufi hits for the audience. The concert was organized by the AAS group, an NGO that works to spread awareness about cervical cancer among women and ways to prevent it, and this concert was organized to spread that message."

== Acting career ==
In 1992, Esakhelvi made his acting debut in the Punjabi-language movie Dil Lagi, co-starring with senior actors such as Sultan Rahi and Jawed Sheikh as well fellow folk singer Arif Lohar, who also made his acting debut. The same year, he starred in the Punjabi/Urdu bilingual film Zindagi, again with Sultan Rahi and Arif Lohar in prominent roles, with Abida Parveen making her debut as a playback singer.

== Personal life ==
Attaullah Khan received his early education from Esakhel. He relocated to Lahore after becoming a professional musician, performing in Saraiki, Urdu, Punjabi, Pashto and English. He has been married five times – his fourth wife Bazgha being a former actress. He has four children from his fourth and fifth wives. His daughter, Laraib Atta, is a professional VFX artist who has worked for several Hollywood films. His son, Sanwal Esakhelvi, is also pursuing a career in music.

== Legacy ==
Attaullah Esakhelvi is considered a folk icon in Pakistan and is widely considered one of the most popular folk singers in Pakistan. The constant companion of Pakistani truck drivers is the lilting tunes of Attaullah Khan Esakhelvi. This Mianwali-born vocalist, with his swashbuckler moustache, kameez shalwar, and shawl on one shoulder, became the poster boy for traditional Pakistani music.

Singing in various Lahnda varieties, his songs became renown from his first session for Radio Pakistan, Bahawalpur, in the mid-1970s.

He has recorded more than 50,000 songs in seven languages. He has received a lifetime achievement award from Queen Elizabeth II of Great Britain and had his name entered in the Guinness Book of World Records in 1994 for the highest number of audio albums released.

== Awards ==
- The Government of Pakistan awarded him the Pride of Performance Award in 1991.
- Sitara e Imtiaz (Star of Excellence) on March 23, 2019, by the President of Pakistan.

== Selected popular songs ==
Year	Song	Artist	Music director	Label
1978	"Idhar Zindgi Ka Janaza Uthay Ga"	Attaullah Khan		Rehmat Gramophone House
1992	"Qameez Teri Kaali, Te Sohnay Phullan Wali"	Ataullah Khan		OSA
2011	"Pyaar Naal Na Sahi"	Ataullah Khan		Coke Studio (Pakistan)
2011	"Ni othan Waale"	Ataullah Khan		Coke Studio (Pakistan)

== Musicians ==
Attaullah has his own band, which travels with him. Members of the band include:

- Salamat Ali Khan (tabla)
- Javed Ali (dholak)
- Babar (flute)
- Sabir Ali (harmonium)

The musicians in Attaullah's band have performed with him since the 1970s, in Pakistan, United States of America, Japan, Canada, United Kingdom, France, Spain, Germany, India, Italy, Australia, Oman, New Zealand, Hong Kong and UAE.
