= Mughal-e-Funk =

- Origin: Lahore
- Years active: 2015-present
- Members: Kami Paul; Farhan Ali; Rakae Jamil; Rufus Shahzad

Mughal-e-Funk is an instrumental funk band from Pakistan. The band comprises Kami Paul (drummer), Farhan Ali (bass), Rakae Jamil (sitar), and Rufus Shahzad (keyboards & synths). The band has featured in popular shows including Coke Studio, Levi's Live, and Bisconni Music.

== Bisconni Music ==
Mughal-e-Funk appeared in the music show Bisconni Music and performed Sakal Ban (originally written by Amir Khusrau) with Meesha Shafi. The song was also featured by Rolling Stone India. They also performed Meda Ishq with Mohammad Aizaz Sohail and Mahnoor Altaf.

== Sultanat ==
Mughal-e-Funk released its debut EP Sultanat in 2018. The EP comprises six songs, each named after a Mughal Emperor.

== Discography ==
Sultanat	Coke Studio	Levi's Live	Bisconni Music	Singles
Babar	Aurangzeb	Akbar	Sakal Ban	Jahangir
Aurangzeb	Aurangzeb	Akbar	Sakal Ban	Jahangir
Humayun	Aurangzeb	Akbar	Sakal Ban	Jahangir
Shah Jahan	Aurangzeb	Akbar	Sakal Ban	Jahangir
Akbar	Aurangzeb	Akbar	Sakal Ban	Jahangir
Bahadur Shah Zafar	Aurangzeb	Akbar	Sakal Ban	Jahangir
