= Hum Dekhenge =

Revolutionary Urdu poem by Faiz Ahmad Faiz

- by Faiz Ahmed Faiz
- Original title: وَيَبْقَىٰ وَجْهُ رَبِّكَ
- Written: 1979
- First published in: 1981
- Language: Urdu
- Lines: 21

Hum Dekhenge (Urdu: ہم دیکھیں گے - In English We shall see) is a popular Urdu nazm, written by the Pakistani poet Faiz Ahmad Faiz. Originally written as Wa yabqā wajhu rabbika (And the countenance of your Lord will outlast all), it was included in the seventh poetry book of Faiz -- Mere Dil Mere Musafir.

== Background ==
The nazm was composed as a medium of protest against Zia Ul Haq's regime. It gained a rapid cult-following as a leftist song of resistance and defiance, after a public rendition by Iqbal Bano at Alhamra Arts Council on 13 February 1986, ignoring the ban on Faiz's poetry.

However, scholars of Urdu such as Rauf Parekh and others argue that while Faiz was critical of Zia, this poem wasn't written with him in mind but as a tribute to the 1979 Islamic revolution of Iran, this poem having been written just a few months after the revolution. This also explains the poem's Islamic symbols and Sufi motifs.

Muhammad Azam Nadwi translated Faiz's this nazm into Arabic under the title "Naḥnu Narā'" (Arabic: نحن نرى).

== Themes ==
Faiz employs the metaphor of traditional Islamic imagery to subvert and challenge Zia's fundamentalist interpretation of them; Qayamat, the Day of Reckoning is transformed into the Day of Revolution, wherein Zia's military government will be ousted by the people and democracy will be re-installed.

== In popular culture ==
=== Media ===
The song was recreated in Coke Studio Season 11 on 22 July 2018, under the aegis of Zohaib Kazi and Ali Hamza. (Note: The Coke Studio rendition however removed some lines, which were arguably the most controversial part of the poem.) In the movie The Kashmir Files, it was depicted as being sung by students of a left-leaning Indian university to as a song of protest

=== Protests ===
==== Pakistan ====
The poem gained importance in protests against Pervez Musharraf in the early 2000s.

==== India ====
During the Citizenship Amendment Act protests in India, faculty members of IIT Kanpur took issue with Hum Dekhenge being sung by protesting students in the campus, and alleged it to be "anti-Hindu". (Note: The line "sab but uṭhvāe jāenge" and "bas nām rahegā allāh kā" respectively translates to "when all the idols will be removed" and "only Allah will remain", from a very-literal reading. It was thus perceived to challenge idolatry and polytheism, which many Hindus adhere to.) The IIT instituted a commission to look into the issue. The student media body rejected the charges as being misinformed and communal, which divorced the poem from its societal context.
