= Kami Paul =

- Born: Kamran Paul; May 25, 1988 (age 38)
- Known for: Noori, Mughal-E-Funk
- Notable work: Coke Studio Season 14

Kami Paul (born Kamran Paul) is a Pakistani drummer and percussionist. He is known for his work with the rock band Noori, the instrumental fusion group Mughal-e-Funk, and his contributions to the Pakistani music television series Coke Studio. He has also performed and recorded with several Pakistani musicians, including Meesha Shafi, Ali Azmat and Shehzad Roy.

== Early life and career ==
Paul developed an interest in music during childhood and began playing drums at approximately seven years of age.

He has performed as a session musician and live drummer with several Pakistani artists and bands, including Noori and Meesha Shafi. His work has also included collaborations with musicians from different musical genres.

Paul appeared in Coke Studio as a guest musician in Season 9 and subsequently joined its house band for Season 11. He also performed with the house band in Seasons 12 and 14.

=== Mughal-e-Funk ===
Paul is a founding member of Mughal-e-Funk, an instrumental fusion group combining elements of South Asian music with funk and contemporary musical styles. The group released its debut instrumental album, Sultanat, in 2018. Its members included Rakae Jamil, Rufus Shehzad, Farhan Ali and Paul.
