= Faizan Khawaja =

Pakistani American Actor and Producer

- Born: 7 January 1986 (age 40); Houston, Texas, U.S.
- Education: Whistling Woods International Institute
- Occupation: actor
- Years active: 2010-present
- Parent: Rashid Khawaja (film/TV producer)

Faizan Khawaja (born 7 January 1986) is a Pakistani American actor and producer.

== Early life and career ==
Faizan Khawaja was born on 7 January 1986 in Houston, United States. His father, Rashid Khawaja, a veteran film and TV producer, co-produced Salakhain, and has had minor roles in successful movies like Bol and Actor in Law. Faizan Khawaja attended early schooling in Houston and then move to India and attended Whistling Woods International Institute where he studied acting and filmmaking and was also trained by Naseeruddin Shah. Faizan moved to Karachi, Pakistan after the 2008 Mumbai attacks and began his career as a television actor. He then appeared in many television serials including Mann Ke Moti and Love, Life Aur Lahore. He has also signed a Bollywood film Bankster which is directed by Zeenat Aman's son Azaan Khan. He also appeared in the comedy-thriller film Chupan Chupai (2016).

== Filmography ==
=== Television ===
Year	Title	Role	Channel
2012	Aik Nayee Cinderella	Rooman	Geo TV
2012	Meri Ladli	Arbaaz	ARY Digital
2012	Shehryar Shehzadi	Imran	Urdu 1
2012	Meri Saheli Meri Humjoli	Moosa	Urdu 1
2013	Meri Maa		Geo TV
2013	Main Gunehgar Nahi	Zaid	ARY Digital
2013	Love, Life Aur Lahore		A-Plus
2013	Mann Ke Moti	Daniyal	Geo TV
2014	Ru Baru	Sarmad	Hum TV
2014	Rukhsati		Geo TV
2014	Deemak		Geo Entertainment
2016	Mera Dard Bayzuba	Talat	Geo TV
2016	Manchahi	Sakhawat	Geo TV
2016	Dil Haari	Ahsan	ARY Zindagi
2018	Ishq Tamasha	Arham	Hum TV
2018	Sodai	Shaheer	Express Entertainment
2018	Ki Jaana Main Kaun	Faris	Hum TV
2018	Kasak Rahay Ge	Fasih	TVOne Pakistan
2018	Tu Ishq Hai	Fawad	Hum TV
2019	Qismat	Rayan	Hum TV
2020	Dulhan	Shahmeer	Hum TV

=== Film ===
Key
†	Denotes films that are not released/aired

Year	Title	Role	Additional notes
2016	Life Story	Shayan	"Pakistan’s first made-for-television film" that he himself produced
2017	Chupan Chupai	Bobby Durrani	Lollywood debut
2017	Bankster	Akash	Hindi short film
2020	Half Fry †	-	Lollywood
2023	Yaara Vey		
