= Roshan Digital Account =

Pakistani banking service

- Native name: روشن ڈیجیٹل اکاؤنٹ
- Type: Digital banking facility for Overseas Pakistanis
- Founded: September 2020; 6 years ago
- Services: see below
- Owner: Government of Pakistan
- Parent: State Bank of Pakistan
- Website: www.sbp.org.pk/rda/index.html

Roshan Digital Account (RDA) (Urdu روشن ڈیجیٹل اکاؤنٹ) is a facility available to non-resident Pakistanis, this facility allows Pakistani nationals living abroad to have access to banking services within Pakistan without having to visit a consulate, embassy, or a physical bank branch. The initiative was launched by the government of Imran Khan, who inaugurated the programme in September 2020. Toward the end of August 2021, RDA deposits had exceeded $2 billion .

The RDA banking process is entirely digital with accounts setup and operated online. The facility has simplified procedures for opening an account compared to the challenges non-resident Pakistanis faced in accessing banking services before this facility was available. The account can be set up within 48 hours.

== History ==
RDA services were launched in September 2020 and as of end of October 2022 over US $5.2 billion have been deposited by oversees Pakistanis in these accounts.

The facility was developed by the State Bank of Pakistan, the Pakistani central bank, on the policy initiative of the Pakistani government of PM Imran Khan, the facility continues to be operated by the central bank.

== Services ==
Overseas Pakistanis can open these accounts which are available in either rupee denomination or a foreign currency denomination (such as pound, euro or dollar). Funds in these accounts are fully repatriable (no limit on inflow or outflow of money from the accounts). Another service available for overseas Pakistanis is the ability to use this RDA facility to invest in Pakistan's stock market or buy Pakistani government bonds directly from their accounts. At the start of the initiative, eight of Pakistan's banks agreed to provide this facility to non-resident Pakistanis, including some of the largest players in Pakistani banking such as Faysal Bank, Habib Bank Limited (HBL) and United Bank Limited (UBL). As of now, 14 banks are offering Roshan Digital Account Services, both in conventional and Islamic Banking.
