= Sana Safinaz =

Pakistani fashion label

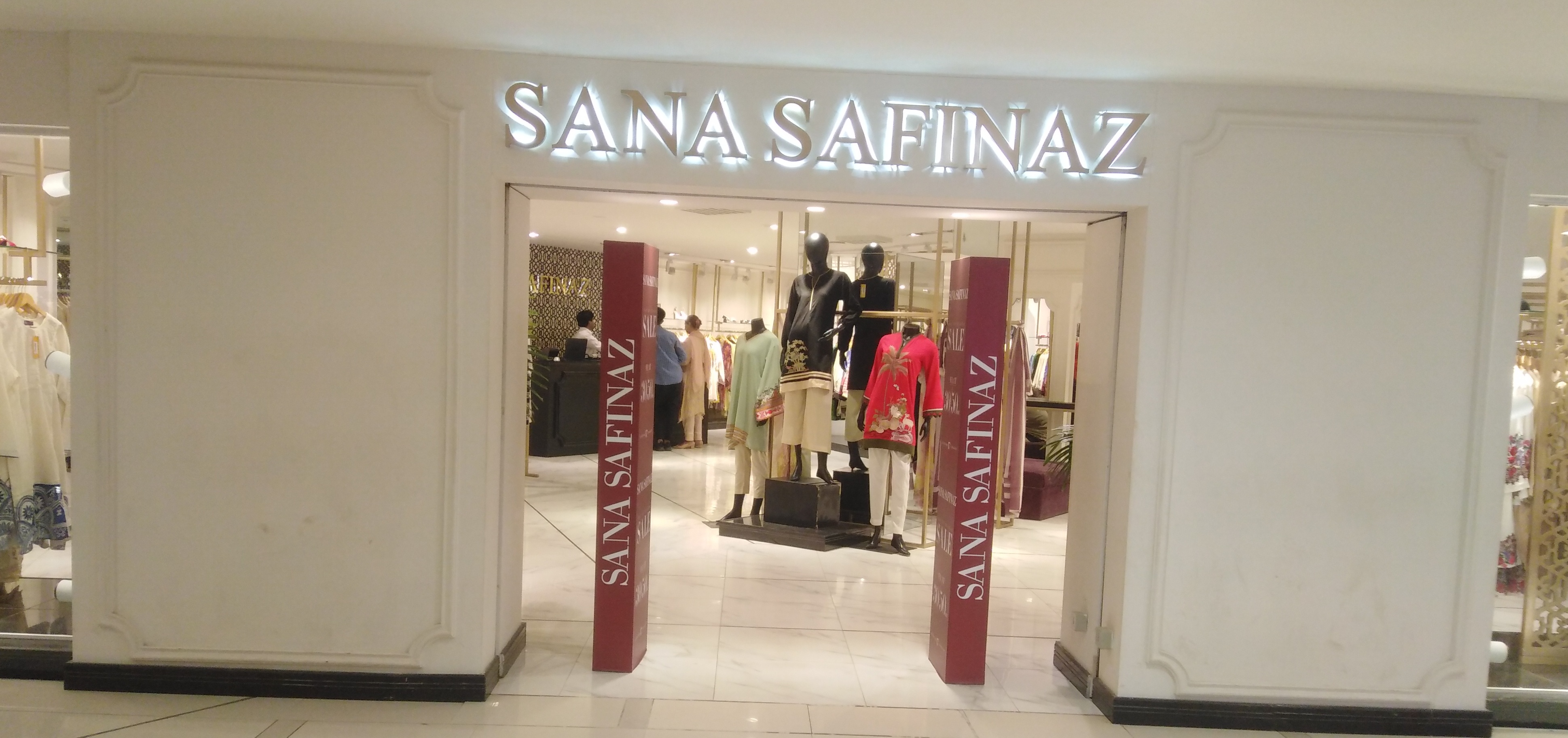
- Native name: سنا سفیناز
- Type: Private
- Industry: Retail
- Founded: 1989; 37 years ago in Karachi, Pakistan
- Founders: Sana Hashwani; Safinaz Muneer
- Headquarters: Karachi, Pakistan
- Number of locations: 30 (2019)
- Area served: Worldwide
- Products: Clothing, accessories, footwear, fragrances, home furnishings
- Website: sanasafinaz.com

Sana Safinaz is a Pakistani fashion label and clothing retailer headquartered in Karachi. Founded in 1989 by designers Sana Hashwani and Safinaz Muneer, it designs and retails ready-to-wear, unstitched fabric, bridal couture, accessories, and home goods.

== History ==
Sana Safinaz was founded in 1989 in Karachi by Sana Hashwani and Safinaz Muneer, two recently married women who began the business with a seed money of a few thousand rupees. The pair initially designed light evening wear and bridal couture, with Muneer fronting the bridal side of the business. Before launching independently under their own name, the duo spent three years designing for Alkaram and a further three years at Lakhany Mills, where their seasonal lawn collection was sold under the Sana Safinaz by Lakhany label. The Lakhany association established their reputation as designers in the unstitched lawn segment, after which they began producing lawn independently.

In 2013, Sana Safinaz opened its first standalone retail store at Dolmen City Mall in Karachi. Additional flagship stores in Lahore, on Karachi's Tariq Road and in Islamabad followed.

In 2015, Indian fabric manufacturer OCM became the sole authorised distributor of the label's womenswear in India, beginning with the 2015 Silk Collection.

In March 2018, Sana Safinaz faced widespread criticism after its summer lawn campaign, shot in Kenya's Maasai Mara National Reserve and featuring Pakistani models posed alongside members of the Maasai community, was accused of cultural appropriation and racism.
