= Zohaib Kazi =

Pakistani musician

- Born: Muhammad Zohaib Kazi; 22 July 1984 (age 41); Karachi, Sindh, Pakistan
- Genres: Lounge, electronica, contemporary, Folk
- Occupations: Composer, songwriter, record producer, graphic novelist
- Instruments: Guitar, sitar, keyboard, synthesizer
- Years active: 2005–present

Zohaib Kazi (Urdu: زوہیب قاضی) is a Pakistani musician, composer, lyricist, and record producer. Kazi started his media career at Hum Network Limited before serving as an associate producer at Coke Studio Pakistan from 2009 to 2017. In 2012, Kazi released a digital album Butterfly in Space, but received a widespread acclaim and recognition with his 2016 conceptual album Ismail Ka Urdu Sheher which was also released as a graphic novel. The album gained a world-wide recognition, and was nominated for Best Music Album at 15th Lux Style Awards.

In 2017, Kazi partnered with Patari to produce his second album Fanoos, containing songs from regional artists across Pakistan. Fanoos was met with a positive response and earned him another Best Music Album nomination at the 17th Lux Style Awards. One song from the album, "Takht Hazar", was nominated for Best Song of the Year, with Kazi accredited as a producer. In 2018, Kazi was announced as a lead producer for the eleventh series of Coke Studio with musician Ali Hamza.

== Discography ==
=== Albums ===
- Butterfly in Space (2012)
- Ismail Ka Urdu Sheher (2015)
- Fanoos (2017)

=== Singles ===
- "Bijuri" ft. Devika Chawla (2011)
- "Naraaz Mausam" ft. Devika Chawla (2012)
- "Alvida" ft. Zoe Viccaji (2013)
- "Bolo" ft. Zoe Viccaji (2013)

=== Other works ===
- Lounge Nirvana (2012)
- Coke Studio Explorer (2018)
- Coke Studio Pakistan (season 11) (2018)

== Awards and nominations ==
Year	Awards	Category	Nominated work	Result	Ref(s)
2016	Lux Style Awards	Best Music album	Ismail Ka Urdu Sheher	Nominated	
2018	Lux Style Awards	Best Music album	Fanoos	Nominated	
2018	Lux Style Awards	Best Song of the Year	"Takht Hazar"	Nominated	
