= Sharfabad Society =

Sharfabad Society (Urdu: شرف آباد) is one of the neighbourhoods of Gulshan-e-Iqbal Town in Karachi, Sindh, Pakistan.

There are several ethnic groups in Sharfabad Society including Muhajirs, Punjabis, Sindhis, Kashmiris, Seraikis, Pakhtuns, Balochis, Memons, Bohras, Ismailis, etc. Over 99% of the population is Muslim. The population of Gulshan-e-Iqbal Town is estimated to be nearly one million.

== See also ==
- Gulshan-e-Iqbal Town
- Delhi Mercantile Society
- Essa Nagri
- Gulshan-e-Iqbal I
- Gulshan-e-Iqbal II
- Gulzar-e-Hijri
- Gulistan-e-Jauhar
- Jamali Colony
- Metroville Colony
- Pehlwan Goth
- P.I.B. Colony
- Safooran Goth
- Shanti Nagar
