= 2023 Karachi local elections =

Pakistani elections

- 15 January 2023

246 UC's out of 367 of Karachi Metropolitan Corporation 184 seats needed for a majority
- Turnout: TBD

	First party	Second party	Third party
Leader	Murtaza Wahab	Hafiz Naeem ur Rehman	Khurrum Sher Zaman
Party	PPP	JI	PTI
Leader since	2007	2013	1996
Leader's seat	UC-8 Ibrahim Hyderi	UC-8 North Nazimabad	UC-11 Saddar (lost)
Last election	11.5%, 24 seats	3.5%, 7 seats	8.8%, 10 seats
Seats won	155	132	62
Seat change	▲131	▲125	▲52
Popular vote	TBD	TBD	TBD
Percentage	TBD	TBD	TBD
Swing	TBD	TBD	TBD
- Results of each Union Committee (UC) in five of Karachi's seven districts

- Structure of the Karachi Metropolitan Corporation after the election
Mayor before election
Waseem Akhtar
MQM-L
Elected Mayor
Murtaza Wahab
PPP

The 2023 Karachi local government elections were held in Karachi, Pakistan on 15 January 2023 to elect members of local councils. These members would then elect the Mayor of Karachi (2023-2026). These elections were the 3rd Karachi local government elections.

== Background ==
In the 2015 elections, the Muttahida Qaumi Movement - Pakistan (MQM-P) won 64.5% of the votes and enough seats to elect their candidate, Waseem Akhtar, to the position of Mayor of Karachi. They were followed by the Pakistan Peoples Party (PPP) with 11.5%, and the Pakistan Muslim League (N) (PML(N)) with 9.2%.

These elections are being held in the aftermath of a successful no-confidence motion against Prime Minister Imran Khan, which saw Shehbaz Sharif becoming the Prime Minister of Pakistan with a coalition government of 9 parties, including the MQM-P, PPP, and PML(N).

=== Merger of MQM factions ===
Since the appointment of Kamran Tessori as the Governor of Sindh, efforts began to merge breakaway factions of the MQM-P like the Pak Sarzameen Party (PSP) and the Farooq Sattar group back into the MQM-P to unite their vote bank to overcome the growing popularity of Pakistan Tehreek-e-Insaf (PTI). The Mohajir Qaumi Movement Pakistan - Haqiqi (MQM-H) was also approached, but refused to merge with the MQM-P.

On the evening of 12 January 2023 Mustafa Kamal, the leader of the PSP, and Farooq Sattar announced their merger with the MQM-P in a press conference.

== Campaign ==
=== Pakistan Tehreek-e-Insaf ===
Pakistan Tehreek-e-Insaf Sindh President Ali Zaidi announced that Pakistan Tehreek-e-Insaf will go solo unlike 2015 when Pakistan Tehreek-e-Insaf allied with Jamat-e-Islami. He also announced that Pakistan Tehreek-e-Insaf will run their campaign under the slogan (Urdu: خودار خود مختار کراچی, romanized: Khuddar Khudmuktar Karachi lit. 'Dignified, Self-reliant Karachi'). Out of 246 UCs across Karachi, Pakistan Tehreek-e-Insaf fielded candidates for 241 UC's. PTI is contesting its senior leader Ashraf Qureshi from 2 UCs of Nazimabad Town. Ashraf Qureshi is a founding member of PTI from Karachi and is considered to be a backbone of PTI Karachi workers. He is one of the candidates for Mayor but the Chairman of Pakistan Tehreek-e-Insaf Imran Khan will ultimately decide the Mayor nominee.

=== Jamaat-e-Islami ===
Jamaat e Islami Karachi, led by Karachi chief Hafiz Naeem Ur Rehman ran a focused campaign on ground (rallies and events) and on social and electronic media. They highlighted the atrocities that the Federal and Provincial Governments have committed against the people of Karachi by depriving them of basic necessities like water, electricity, infrastructure, public transport, green spaces, cleanliness, safety and security. Karachi is listed in one of the worst cities to live in Global Livability Index 2022 even though it gives highest tax in Pakistan. Other cities of Pakistan are growing rapidly while Karachi shows picture of a destroyed city due to some disaster. The campaign slogan (Urdu: حل صرف جماعت اسلامی, romanized: Hal Sirf Jamat-e-Islami lit. 'Jamaat e Islami is the only solution') took social media by storm. Local polls suggested Hafiz Naeem ur Rehman is the most popular leader and 58% Karachiites want him to become the next mayor.

Jamaat-e-Islami Karachi Chief Hafiz Naeem ur Rehman submitted his nomination papers for Al-Falah UC-8 North Nazimabad. Jamat-e-Islami had 233 Chairmen contesting in 246 Union Councils.

== Timeline ==
- On 1 September 2020, local governments across Sindh were dissolved after completion of their terms.
- In December 2021, the Government of Sindh announced that it would hold local government elections in February or March 2022.
- Later, the Election Commission of Pakistan (ECP) announced that the elections would be held on 24 July 2022.
- On 20 July, the ECP rescheduled the elections to 28 August, citing "possible rains and bad weather".
- On 24 August, the ECP once again postponed the elections due to rains and risk of urban flooding. According to a press release, "the new date will be announced when the weather conditions improve".
- On 14 September, the ECP announced the new date for the election to be 23 October.
- On 18 October, the ECP postponed the election for a third time, accepting a request from the Government of Sindh.
- On 22 November, the ECP announced the new date for the election to be 15 January.
- On 12 January, the Government of Sindh requested the ECP to postpone the elections. However, on 13 January, the ECP rejected this request and declared that elections would be held on 15 January, as scheduled.

== Voter Statistics ==
Division	S.No	District	Male Voters	%	Female Voters	%	Total Registered Voters
Karachi	1	Malir	448,263	57.26	334,584	42.74	782,847
Karachi	2	Korangi	789,332	55.36	636,523	44.64	1,425,855
Karachi	3	East	840,068	53.56	728,519	46.44	1,568,587
Karachi	4	South	666,952	54.84	549,200	45.16	1,216,152
Karachi	5	Keamari	469,501	58.77	329,404	41.23	798,905
Karachi	6	West	539,793	58.69	379,955	41.31	919,748
Karachi	7	Central	1,111,404	54.17	940,373	45.83	2,051,777
Total			4,865,313	55.52	3,898,558	44.48	8,763,871

== Karachi Metropolitan Corporation Composition ==
Karachi Metropolitan Corporation has 367 members out of which 246 are directly elected by the people of Karachi. Karachi Division is divided into 7 districts, which are further divided into 25 Town Municipal Corporations and further divided into 246 Union Committees (UCs). All 246 UCs elect a chairman and vice chairman on one ballot and councilor on another ballot. Chairman UC of majority party will become the Mayor whereas Vice Chairmen will be members of the Town Municipal Corporation which will further indirectly elect 33% Women, 5% Youth, 5% Laborers, 5% Non-Muslims, 1% Disabled and 1% Transgender's members on reserved seats.

Every UC is divided into 4 wards which elect one councilor. 2 women councilors, 1 youth councilor, 1 laborer and 1 Non-Muslim councilor are indirectly elected.

Union Committees by Towns and Districts
Division	District	Town	Union Committees	Reserved						Total
Division	District	Town	Chairman & Vice Chairman	Women	Youth	Laborers	Non-Muslims	Disabled	Transgender people	Total
Karachi	Central	Nazimabad	7	81	12	12	12	2	2	
Karachi	Central	North Nazimabad	10	81	12	12	12	2	2	
Karachi	Central	New Karachi	13	81	12	12	12	2	2	
Karachi	Central	Liaquatabad	7	81	12	12	12	2	2	
Karachi	Central	Gulberg	8	81	12	12	12	2	2	
Karachi	East	Gulshan-e-Iqbal	8	81	12	12	12	2	2	
Karachi	East	Sohrab Goth	8	81	12	12	12	2	2	
Karachi	East	Chanesar Goth	8	81	12	12	12	2	2	
Karachi	East	Jamshed Town	11	81	12	12	12	2	2	
Karachi	East	Safoora	8	81	12	12	12	2	2	
Karachi	Korangi	Shah Faisal	8	81	12	12	12	2	2	
Karachi	Korangi	Korangi	11	81	12	12	12	2	2	
Karachi	Korangi	Landhi	10	81	12	12	12	2	2	
Karachi	Korangi	Model Colony	8	81	12	12	12	2	2	
Karachi	Keamari	Baldia Town	13	81	12	12	12	2	2	
Karachi	Keamari	Mauripur	11	81	12	12	12	2	2	
Karachi	Keamari	Moriro Mir Bahar	8	81	12	12	12	2	2	
Karachi	Malir	Malir	10	81	12	12	12	2	2	
Karachi	Malir	Ibrahim Hyderi	11	81	12	12	12	2	2	
Karachi	Malir	Gadap	9	81	12	12	12	2	2	
Karachi	West	Orangi	8	81	12	12	12	2	2	
Karachi	West	Mominabad	9	81	12	12	12	2	2	
Karachi	West	Manghopir	16	81	12	12	12	2	2	
Karachi	South	Lyari	13	81	12	12	12	2	2	
Karachi	South	Saddar	13	81	12	12	12	2	2	
Total	7	25	246	81	12	12	12	2	2	367

Wards and Councilors by Towns and Districts
Division	District	Town	Wards	Reserved				Total
Division	District	Town	Councilors	Women	Youth	Laborer	Non-Muslims	Total
Karachi	Central	Nazimabad	28	56	28	28	28	168
Karachi	Central	North Nazimabad	40	80	40	40	40	240
Karachi	Central	New Karachi	52	104	52	52	52	312
Karachi	Central	Liaquatabad	28	56	28	28	28	168
Karachi	Central	Gulberg	32	64	32	32	32	192
Karachi	East	Gulshan-e-Iqbal	32	64	32	32	32	192
Karachi	East	Sohrab Goth	32	64	32	32	32	192
Karachi	East	Chanesar Goth	32	64	32	32	32	192
Karachi	East	Jamshed Town	44	88	44	44	44	264
Karachi	East	Safoora	32	64	32	32	32	192
Karachi	Korangi	Shah Faisal	32	64	32	32	32	192
Karachi	Korangi	Korangi	44	88	44	44	44	264
Karachi	Korangi	Landhi	40	80	40	40	40	240
Karachi	Korangi	Model Colony	32	64	32	32	32	192
Karachi	Keamari	Baldia Town	52	104	52	52	52	312
Karachi	Keamari	Mauripur	44	88	44	44	44	264
Karachi	Keamari	Moriro Mir Bahar	32	64	32	32	32	192
Karachi	Malir	Malir	40	80	40	40	40	240
Karachi	Malir	Ibrahim Hyderi	44	88	44	44	44	264
Karachi	Malir	Gadap	36	72	36	36	36	216
Karachi	West	Orangi	32	64	32	32	32	192
Karachi	West	Mominabad	36	72	36	36	36	216
Karachi	West	Manghopir	64	128	64	64	64	384
Karachi	South	Lyari	52	104	52	52	52	312
Karachi	South	Saddar	52	104	52	52	52	312
Total	7	25	984	1968	984	984	984	5904

== Parties ==
Name	Flag	Symbol	Leader
Pakistan Tehreek-e-Insaf			Imran Khan
Muttahida Qaumi Movement – Pakistan			Khalid Maqbool Siddiqui
Pakistan Peoples Party			Bilawal Bhutto Zardari
Jamaat-e-Islami Pakistan			Siraj-ul-Haq
Pakistan Muslim League (N)			Shehbaz Sharif
Jamiat Ulema-e-Islam (F)			Fazal-ur-Rehman
Muhajir Qaumi Movement – Haqiqi			Afaq Ahmed
Tehreek-e-Labbaik Pakistan			Saad Hussain Rizvi

== Results ==
Results by Union Committees (UC's)
Party	Vote Share		Union Committees							Total								
Party	Vote Share		Union Committees							General	Reserved						Total	+/-
	Votes	%	Central	East	Korangi	West	Keamari	Malir	South	Total UC's	Women	Youth	Labour	Non-Muslims	Disabled	Transgender people	Grand Total	Change
PPP			6	15	4	16	27	20	16	104	34	5	5	5	1	1	155	▲131
JI			38	19	23	6	-	3	-	89	29	4	4	4	1	1	132	▲125
PTI			1	9	8	9	2	4	9	42	14	2	2	2	-	-	62	▲52
PMLN			-	-	2	-	3	2	-	7	3	1	1	1	-	-	13	▼6
JUI(F)			-	-	-	2	-	-	-	2	1	-	-	-	-	-	3	▲2
TLP			-	-	-	-	-	-	1	1	-	-	-	-	-	-	1	New entry
MQM-L			-	-	-	-	-	1	-	1	-	-	-	-	-	-	1	▼10
MQM-H			-	-	-	-	-	-	-	-	-	-	-	-	-	-	-	Steady
MQM-P	Boycotted		-	-	-	-	-	-	-	-	-	-	-	-	-	-	-	▼135
Total Valid Votes			45	43	37	33	32	30	26	246	81	12	12	12	2	2	367	-
Invalid/Rejected Votes			Polling in 11 UC's postponed due to death of candidates.															
Total Votes Polled / Turnout			Polling in 11 UC's postponed due to death of candidates.															
Registered Voters	8,763,871	100																

== Aftermath ==
After declaration of results, Jamat-e-Islami and Pakistan Tehreek-e-Insaf are likely to form coalition government in Karachi. Jamat-e-Islami leader Hafiz Naeem will become mayor. PPP leader Saeed Ghani said that PPP welcomes all parties except PTI for coalition and mayor election. Meanwhile Pakistan Tehreek-e-Insaf Leader Firdous Shamim Naqvi said to support Jamat-e-Islami.

After recount on 16 January, Jamat-e-Islami gained 2 UC's while People's Party lost 2. Recount is still due on many UC's in which result is controversial.

FAFEN a prominent election watch organization raised questions about the transparency of the local elections in Karachi.

Both PTI and JI joined hands against PPP. In a joint Press Conference, Ali Zaidi and Hafiz Naeem stated that PPP with the help of Sindh election commission rigged and changed result of many UC's

By-elections were triggered by the resignations of dozens of Pakistan Tehreek-e-Insaf lawmakers and the dissolution of the assemblies in Punjab and Khyber-Pakhtunkhwa. The Election Commission of Pakistan had requested the General Headquarters (GHQ) of the army and the Lahore High Court (LHC) for providing soldiers and judicial officers for security and voting during the by-elections and the provincial assembly elections in Punjab and Khyber-Pakhtunkhwa. GHQ declined the request due to overwhelming involvement in internal security challenges and the census, while the LHC declined due to a huge backlog of pending cases.

By-Elections were held for 11 UC's of Karachi on Sunday 7 May 2023. People's Party won 7 UC's followed by Jamaat e Islami Pakistan which won 4 UC Chairman seats.
