= 2017 Karachi stabbings =

Series of attacks

- Karachi (Sindh) Karachi (Pakistan)
- Location: 24°51′41.26″N 67°0′35.78″E; Karachi, Pakistan
- Date: 25 September 2017 – 16 October 2017
- Target: Female citizens
- Attack type: Stabbing
- Weapon: Sharp object / knife
- Deaths: 0
- Injuries: 16

The 2017 Karachi stabbings were a series of attacks carried out by an unknown person against women in Karachi, Sindh, Pakistan. The spree began on 25 September 2017 and injured 16 women in total, none of whom were robbed or killed.

== Attacks ==
The stabber first injured three female citizens on 25 September. He then injured two more on 26 September, and another on 28 September. The affected area was said to be from Johar Chowrangi to Pehlwan Goth between Habib University and Rado Bakery, and the victims were brought to nearby hospital Darus Sehat in Gulistan-e-Johar.

On 4 October, five women were wounded in an area between Gulshan-e-Jamal to Gulshan Chowrangi within three hours. On 16 October, a girl was stabbed near Federal B. Area.

Some women remained either untraceable, or were approached by the local police station, but they refused to file complaints. According to information released by the police, 16 female citizens had fallen victim.

== Perpetrator ==
The attacks were done by the same person in the same clothing. As reported by some victims and seen in CCTV footage, the suspect appeared to be a thin man, standing between 5'7" and 5'9" and aged 20–29, clad in a black T-shirt and jeans with a bag. He rode a red motorcycle wearing a helmet, and attacked from behind a woman with his left hand using a sharp object. One of the victims saw him without a helmet, and would later state to authorities that the man had curly hair and a light shave. He was also said to be suffering from a psychological disorder.

Captured CCTV footage was of insufficient quality to aid in the investigation, as the attacker's face and bike's number plate were extremely difficult to make out. Police ruled out terrorist involvement as all the survivors were "decently attired".

== Reactions ==
These attacks spread panic and fear, forcing many women to stay home. Soon, high alert security was sent to patrol the areas and investigate throughout.

Following this, attendance at the University of Karachi declined substantially, with female students demanding additional security. They were advised to use point busses instead of using public transport, and the use of helmets while riding a bike within the university premises was banned. A police team also visited the university to validate reports of attacks on women on campus; however, Vice Chancellor Prof. Dr. Muhammad Ajmal Khan rejected the reports.

== Aftermath ==
On 12 October, Sahiwal police arrested M. Shahzad under suspicion of aiding the culprit. On 15 October with the help of a team of Karachi police, Sahiwal police arrested their prime suspect, Muhammad Waseem, in Mandi Bahauddin. Police also linked Waseem to similar knife attacks in Chichawatni, Sahiwal, Rawalpindi and Lahore. The subsequent attack in Federal B. Area sowed doubt of Waseem's involvement in the Karachi attacks, however, and at a later meeting of the Senate Functional Committee on Human Rights to discuss the process of the case Sindh police would claim that there was no evidence Waseem had ever visited Karachi. Waseem was later interrogated by Punjab police for potential involvement in the attacks in Lahore, Rawalpindi, and Sahiwal, but on 14 November all five cases against Waseem were dismissed due to a lack of evidence.
