= Pakistan String Puppetry Festival =

Festival in Karachi, Pakistan

- Also called: Thespianz String Puppetry Festival
- Type: cultural, social
- Celebrations: String Puppetry Performance for Social Awareness
- Begins: In the month of October
- Ends: June or July
- Frequency: annual

The Pakistan String Puppetry festival is Pakistan's biggest city-wide String Puppetry Festival with more than 300 performances for 30,000 viewers held from October to January in Karachi, Pakistan. It is organized by Thespianz Theatre. The festival began in October 2016. The festival endeavors to charm audiences, raise awareness and urges the rejection of extremism and violence.

== First Festival ==
The first festival began on 25 October 2016 with the aim to heal the Karachi city through 300 various string puppetry performances in 79 schools, colleges, and universities. Three plays were presented: Jheel Saiful Malook, Sindbad, and one promoting harmony between the four provinces.

The performances attracted a diverse audience, including celebrities and members of the media.

== Second Festival ==
The second Pakistan String Puppetry Festival by Thespianz Theatre began on January 14 and till July 31, 2019. With 330 puppet shows, the event considered to be the longest festival held in Pakistan, to date. The festival was held at 11 areas in Karachi to provide entertainment to the lower socio-economic class for free, and to inculcate awareness about acceptance, religious harmony and Pakistan's cultural values.

Festival Areas
Sakhi Hasan	Gulzar-e-Hijri	Shirin Jinnah Colony	Maripur
Pehelwan Goth	Chakiwara	Chakra Goth	Khadda Memon
Saeedabad	Ibrahim Hydri	Paposh Nagar	

Faisal Malik (artistic director of Thespianz Theatre) leads this festival while Nouman Mehmood has written the scrips for festival performances with an easy-to-understand wordings so that a common man understand the social messages. 100 unique puppets were presented in this festival to highlight different culture of Pakistan through traditional attires of Sindhis, Punjabis, Baluchis, Pashtuns and other traditions.
