= Bahadurabad =

Neighbourhood of Karachi, Pakistan

Coordinates: 24°53′N 67°04′E

Bahadurabad بہادر آباد
- Neighborhood
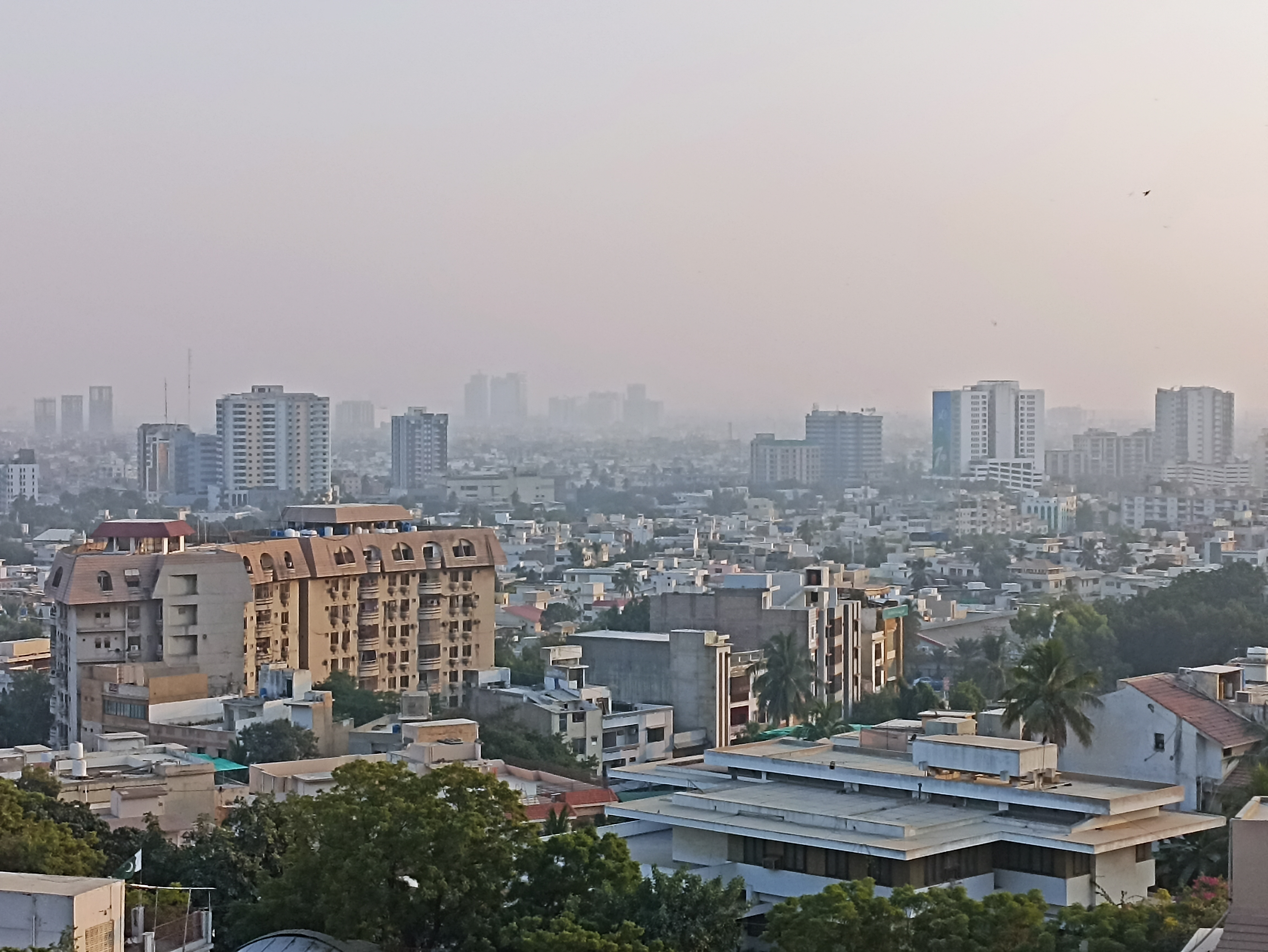
- Aerial view of Bahadurabad
- Interactive map of Bahadurabad
- Town: Gulshan Town
- District: Karachi East
- Time zone: UTC+5 (PST)
- Postal code: 7482

Bahadurabad (Urdu: بہادر آباد) is one of the neighbourhoods of Gulshan Town, Karachi, Sindh, Pakistan. It is located in the Civic Centre zone in the Gulshan Town. It was originally inhabited by mainly middle-class Hyderabadi Muhajirs, who migrated from Hyderabad Deccan (now Hyderabad, Telangana, India) after the creation of Pakistan in 1947, and mainly after India's annexation of Hyderabad in 1948.

Bahadurabad neighbourhood in Karachi is named after the noted freedom fighter Bahadur Yar Jung (1905–1944), a Muslim nationalist and a prominent member of the Pakistan Movement from Hyderabad Deccan. In 2007, a replica of the famous Charminar monument of Old City of Hyderabad, was constructed on the main crossing of Bahadurabad. Its famous for its chaar minaar chowrangi

== Gallery ==
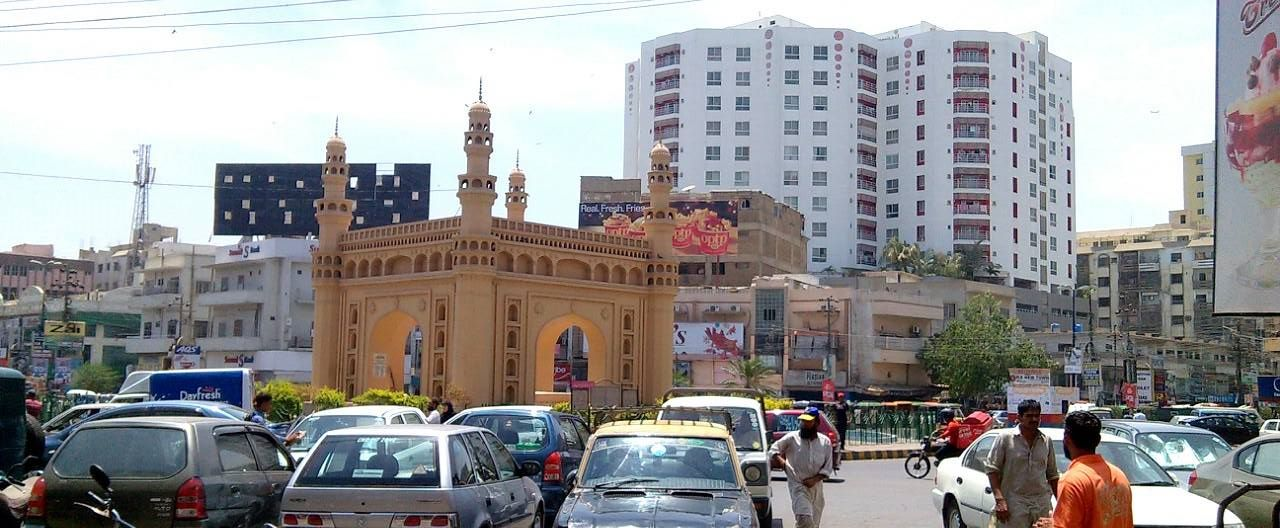
This roundabout in Karachi was listed as one of the world's top roundabouts in 2015.

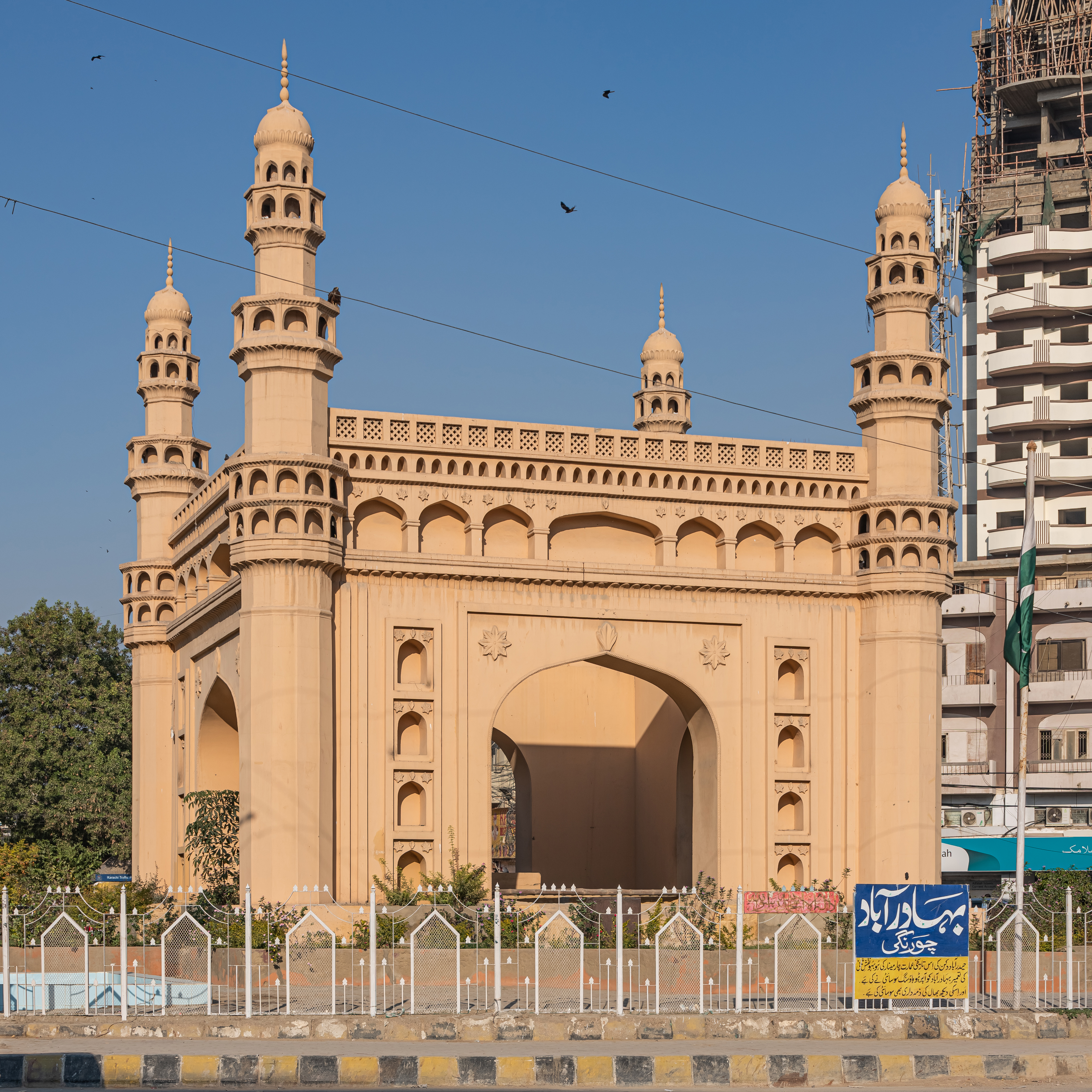
Charminar Chowrangi, built in Bahadurabad in 2007

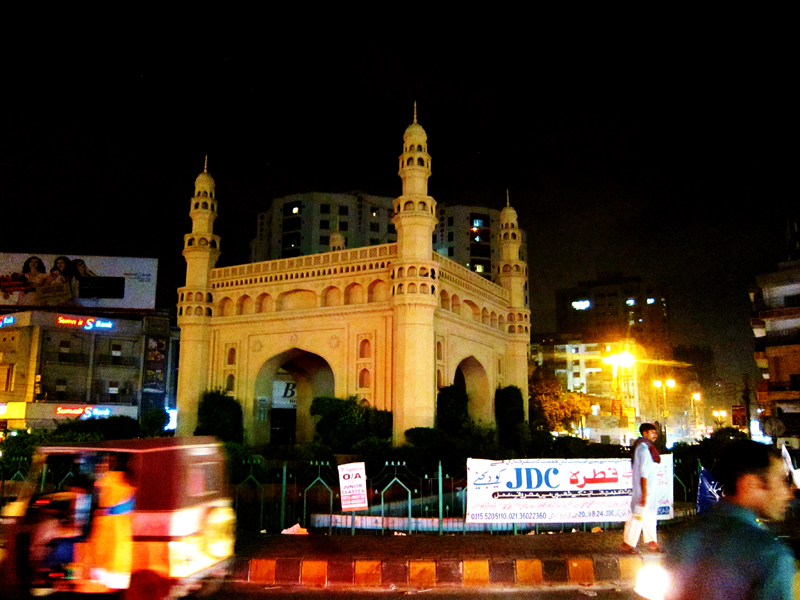
Charminar Chowrangi, night view on Eid-ul-Fitr 2014.

== See also ==
- Hyderabad Colony
- Abdul Rashid Godil
