= Hasan Askari (writer) =

Pakistani scholar and writer

- Born: 5 November 1919; Bulandshahr, United Provinces, British India
- Died: 18 January 1978 (aged 58); Karachi, Sindh, Pakistan
- Education: Allahabad University
- Occupations: Scholar, literary critic writer, linguist

Muhammad Hasan Askari (Urdu: محمد حسَن عسکری) (1919 – 18 January 1978) was a Pakistani scholar, literary critic, writer and linguist of modern Urdu language. Initially "Westernized", he translated western literary, philosophical and metaphysical work into Urdu, notably classics of American, English, French and Russian literature. But in his later years, through personal experiences, geopolitical changes and the influence of authors like René Guénon, and traditional scholars of India towards more latter part of his life, like Maulana Ashraf Ali Thanwi, he became a notable critic of the West and proponent of Islamic culture and ideology.

== Biography ==
=== Family background ===
Muhammad Hasan Askari was born on 5 November 1919 in a village in Bulandshahr, in western Uttar Pradesh, British India, to a "traditional, middle-class" Muslim family, in a cultured milieu where youngsters used to read the Qur'an as well as classics of Persian literature like Hafez and Saadi. His grandfather, Maulvi Husamuddin, was a scholar, while his father, Muhammad Moinul Haq, worked as an accountant in the nearby Shikarpur. He was the eldest of six children.

=== Education and teaching career ===
He joined Allahabad University as an undergraduate in 1938 and earned a Master of Arts degree in English literature in 1942. After completing his education, he joined All India Radio, Delhi. For a brief period around 1944–1946, he also taught English literature at Meerut College.

=== Move to Pakistan and professional career ===
For years, he struggled to find a permanent job in Delhi, and as per his brother that might have pushed him to move to the newly formed state of Pakistan but the decisive factor was the civil strife and riots which followed the partition of India, and in October 1947, he reached Lahore all alone, asking his mother and siblings to also abandon Meerut. That's where he acquired a more cultural approach of Urdu literature, which would represent the Islamic identity of his new country, whereas his "idea of Pakistan was influenced by a European/French model of democracy, where social and economic justice would go hand in hand with the nurturing of cultural traditions in which the individuals, especially those of the intelligentsia such as poets and writers, could be loyal to the state and society, yet free of governmental pressure and perform the duties of informed, perceptive critics and citizens."

In February 1950, he moved to Karachi to work as editor for a government journal, and although that didn't last more than a few months, he got a job as an English teacher in the Islamia College in the same city. With friends and colleagues like Karrar Hussain, he would remain there until his death in January 1978.

=== Death ===
He died on 18 January 1978, due to a "massive heart attack", at the age of 57, and was buried in the Darul Ulum cemetery of Karachi, next to Mufti Muhammad Shafi, whose Qur'anic commentary, Ma'ariful Qu'ran, he was translating into English during his last days. The funeral prayer was led by the latter's son, Mufti Taqi Usmani.

After his death, his personal library was donated to the Bedil Library, located in Sharfabad, Karachi.

== Ideas and ideology ==
=== From "Westernized" to "cultural Islamist" ===
Askari began his literary life as a short story writer in the mould of Anton Chekov, and as an essayist influenced by the ideas of the Progressive Writers' Movement, a Marxist movement conceptualized by Sajjad Zaheer aiming to transform society through literature. His early "Westernization" is noticeable by the fact that, contrarily to the contemporary Urdu writers, his favourite authors were not Maulvi Nazir Ahmad or Premchand, but foreign authors like Flaubert, Chekhov, Émile Zola, James Joyce, Rimbaud and "especially Baudelaire". In that regard, he wrote "obscene" short-stories, involving Anglo-Indians and homoeroticism.

He would go on to write literature in that mood for years, but the Partition of India would bring issues like religion and identity, which would push him to adopt a more cultural approach to literature, and more specifically, an Islamic vision. While more or less a-political, he'd specifically turn anti-Western and even more so anti-American.

The best way to visualize this radical change is by reading a serie of essays, Jhalkiyan, put together by Suhayl Umar and Naghma Umar, chronologically : in the Pre-Partition period, he treats mainly of literature and art, with figures such as Ezra Pound, Andre Gide, Akbar Allahabadi, Firaq Gorakhpuri, Chaucer, Shakespeare, Voltaire, D.H. Lawrence, Michelangelo, Rodin or Jacob Epstein. He also wrote on the literary movement known as the New Apocalyptics. After Partition, his essays become more ideological, and centred around the idea of Urdu as the Islamic cultural cement of the newly founded state of Pakistan. During this period, he also rejets Progressives' ideas about literature, that he embraced years ago. The 1200-odd pages collection of essays also show that during his last years he became disillusioned with Pakistan, thinking it didn't led to the cultural renaissance centred around Urdu he expected, even if he kept his strong opinions about religion, philosophy and politics. As some sort of conclusion to the lack of some Islamic national literature, he declared "the death of Urdu literature" in 1953–1955.

=== Aesthetics ===
With the philosophy of Heidegger and the poetry of Holderlin as well as Mallarmé, but more specifically influenced by the idea of wahdat al wujud (Unity of Existence) found among Islamic philosophers, Askari sought a poetry which would be unveil the "being" of the individual, and was thus critical of the overtly romantic and emotional outbursts of many of his contemporaries and of classics. He blamed the absorption of Western philosophy and thinking by Indian Muslims for downgrading poetry to sentimentalism, and wanted to go back to the Islamic sources and Sufi aesthetics, congratulating the works of the Deobandi scholar Maulana Ashraf Ali Thanwi on the Qur'an and Rumi as representative of this brand of poetics.

His aesthetics were thus another emanation of his ideology and politics.

=== Politics ===
Politically, he has been described as proposing some sort of Islamic socialism, a "self-sufficient Pakistan where Muslims would lead a life enriched with principles of democracy", and was in favour of Zulfikar Ali Bhutto and naturally a harsh critic of Zia-ul-Haq.

== Legacy ==
He had a direct influence on novelists like Intizar Hussain and poets like Nasir Kazmi.

Another literary figure under influence was Saleem Ahmed, whose "house in Karachi was the city`s biggest literary hub" in the 1970s and the early 1980s, as per literary critic Rauf Parekh, who also summarizes Askari's legacy by saying that he "is rightly credited with giving a new literary theory to Urdu criticism and establishing a new school of thought."

== Books ==
- Meri Behtarin Nazm (anthology of his favourite poetry) – 1942
- Riyasat aur Inqilab (translation of Vladimir Lenin’s The State and Revolution) – 1942
- Jazirey (collection of short stories) – 1943
- Mera Behtarin Afsana (anthology of his favourite short stories) – 1943
- Qiyamat Ham Rikab Aye na Aye (collection of novellas) – 1947
- Akhri Salam (translation of Christopher Isherwood’s Goodbye to Berlin) – 1948
- Madame Bovary (translation of Gustave Flaubert's Madame Bovary) – 1950
- Insan aur Admi (critical essays) – 1953
- Surkh-o Siyah (translation of Stendhal's Le Rouge et le Noir) – 1953
- Main Kyun Sharmaun (translation of Sheila Cousins’ To Beg I am Ashamed) – 1959
- Sitara ya Badban (critical essays) – 1963
- Moby Dick (translation of Herman Melville’s Moby Dick) – 1967
- Vaqt ki Ragini (critical essays) – 1969
- Jadidiyat ya Maghribi Gumrahiyon ki Tarikh ka Khakah (philosophical and critical essays) – 1979

== See also ==
- Moinuddin Chishti
- Nizamuddin Awliya
- Ashraf Jahangir Semnani
