= Moti Mahal (Gulshan-e-Iqbal) =

Moti Mahal has been renowned as a bus stop since 1973-74 in Gulshan-e-Iqbal between Block 2 & 3 at Karachi East, Sindh, Pakistan. It was a house in Gulshan-e-Iqbal, Block 3 of the Pukhtoon family who belonged to Quetta, later it became a private school, and nowadays no activity going there."Moti Mahal" means: "the Palace of Pearls".

Moti Mahal lies between Gulshan Chowrangi and Federal B. Area 16 number. There are several marriage halls and mobile shopping malls near Moti Mahal. Imtiaz (supermarket) is also situated in this area where thousands of people come here for shopping daily. The building of Moti Mahal still exists in December 2023 and looks the same as before, although it is not maintained well.

== See also ==
- Gulshan-e-Iqbal
