= Kokan Cooperative Housing Society =

Kokan Cooperative Housing Society is one of the neighborhoods of Gulshan Town in Karachi, Sindh, Pakistan.

Most of the population in the Kokan Cooperative Housing Society belongs to the Konkani Muslim community.

== See also ==
- Gulistan-e-Jauhar
