= Finah =

Village in Astore, Pakistan

Coordinates: 35°20′N 74°52′E

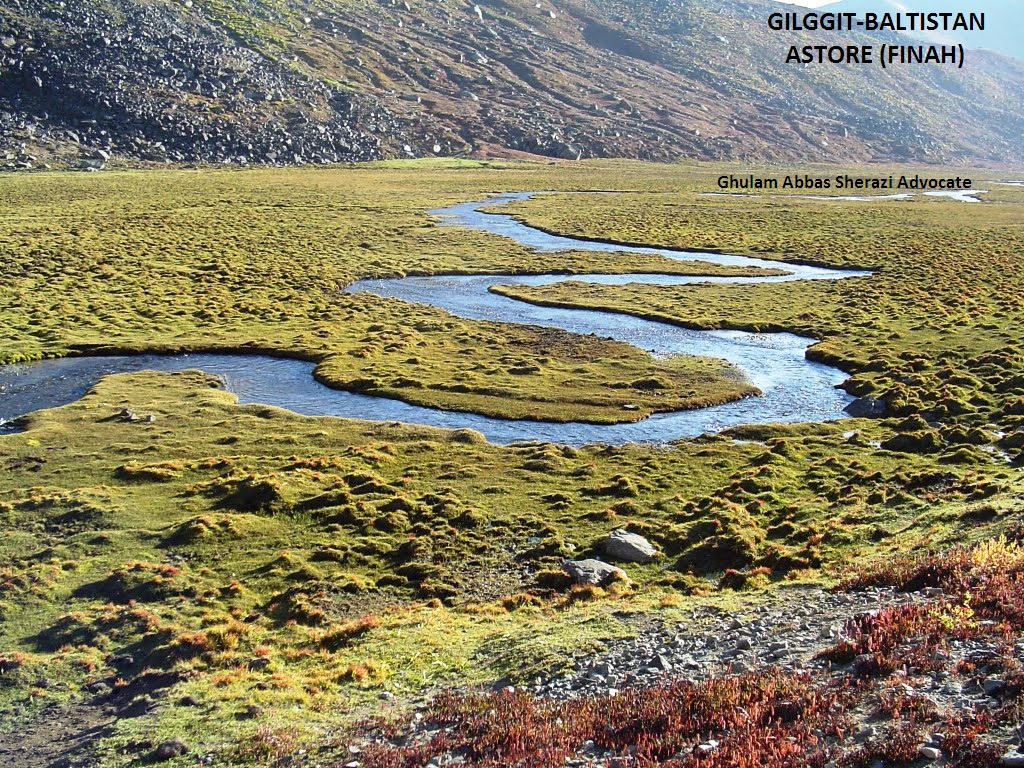
Finah valley

Finah is a village in Astore, Pakistan. It contains the seven sub-villages of Abbas Town (Fuchung), Ali Abad (Danal), Eilldar, Central Finah, Gromain, Maja-Fuchung, Gorichi Fuchung. Finah has three lakes.
