= Baitul Mukarram (disambiguation) =

Baitul Mukarram is an Arabic term which means "the honored house". It can also means,

- Baitul Mukarram Mosque, Dhaka, the national mosque of Bangladesh
- Baitul Mukarram Mosque, Karachi, a mosque in Pakistan
