= Karrar Hussain =

Pakistani educationist, writer, poet and literary critic (1911–1999)

- Born: 8 November 1911; Kota, Rajasthan, British India
- Died: 7 November 1999 (aged 88); Karachi, Pakistan
- Education: MA English, MA Urdu
- Alma mater: Agra University
- Occupations: Educationist, Literary critic, Scholar, Intellectual
- Writing career
- Language: Urdu
- Genre: Quran studies
- Notable works: Study of Quran; Quran & Our Lives; Ghalib: Sab Achcha Kahein Jissay

Karrar Hussain (1911–1999) was a Pakistani educationist, writer, poet and literary critic. In his student days in British India he was affiliated with the Khaksar movement, with which he later parted ways due to a difference of opinion.

== Biography ==
Karrar Hussain was born in Kota, Rajasthan, British India. After passing Intermediate exams from Meerut, he went to Agra University and got master's degrees in English and Urdu. As a student politician, he was affiliated with the Indian National Congress and Khaksar Tehreek of Allama Mashriqi. He started working at Meerut College in 1933, where Jameel Jalibi, Hasan Askari, Intizar Hussain, and Saleem Ahmed were his students.

In 1948 he migrated to Pakistan, where he continued as a lecturer in English at several colleges and was appointed as the first vice-chancellor of the University of Balochistan in 1976.

Among his many writings is a biographical treatise about the Urdu poet Mirza Ghalib commissioned by the Idara Yadgaar-e-Gahlib titled "Ghalib: Sab Achcha Kahein Jissay".

Karrar was also a scholar of Islam, though he advocated that secularism provided the best environment for an Islamic society.

His written work includes several books and published collections of his speeches. He also wrote Urdu poetry, including Naat, Salam, Munqibat, Marsiyas, Nazm and Ghazals. His poems have been published in various literary magazines.

== Publications ==
- Study of Quran
- Quran & our Lives
- Ghalib: Sab Achcha Kahein Jissay
- Sawalat o Khayalaat
- Essays:
  - Iqbal, Socialism aur Islam
  - Pakistani Culture aur iskey Masail
- English Translations of Books:
  - Distribution of Wealth in Islam by Maulana Ashraf Ali Thanwi (Translated by Prof Karrar Hussain & Prof Hasan Askari)
  - Answer to Modernism by Maulana Ashraf Ali Thanwi (Translated by Prof Karrar Hussain & Prof Hasan Askari)

== Death ==
Prof Karrar Hussain died on 7 November 1999 in Karachi, Pakistan.

After Karrar's death in 1999, an annual Professor Karrar Husain Memorial Lecture has been held in Pakistan, at which several prominent speakers have spoken, including sociologist Hamza Alavi.
