= Gulshan-e-Iqbal =

Coordinates: 24°55′N 67°05′E

Gulshan-e-Iqbal گلشنِ اقبال
- Neighbourhood
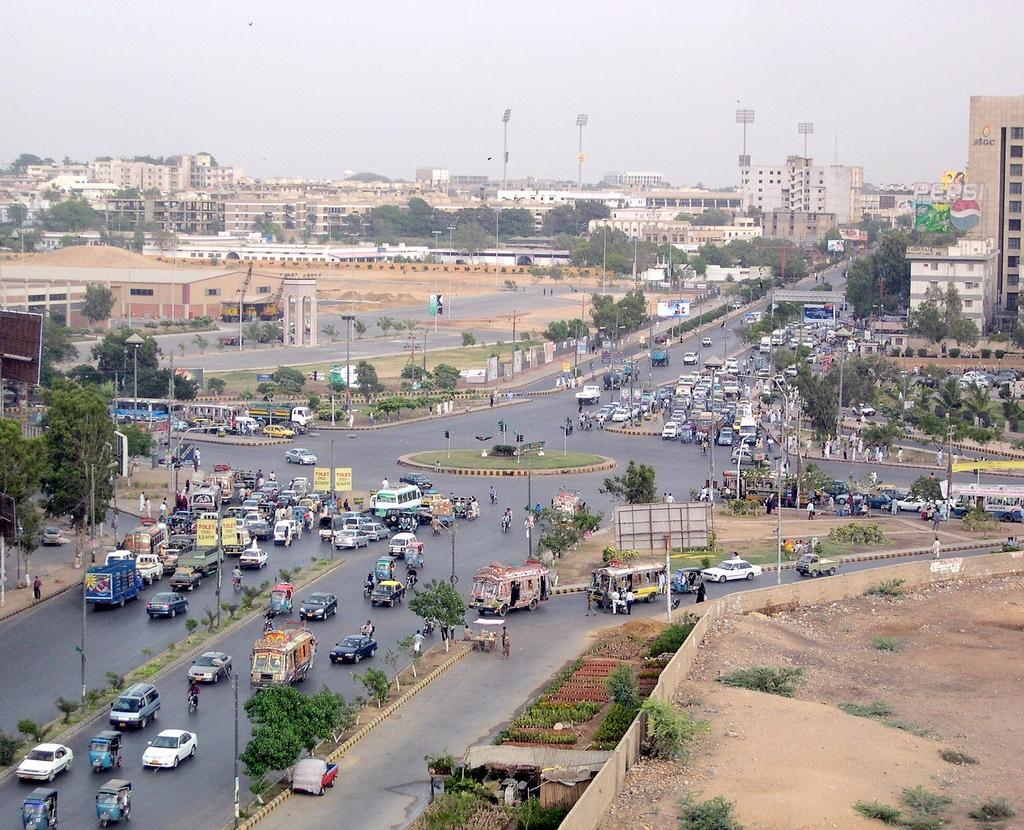
- A view of Gulshan-e-Iqbal, Karachi
- Interactive map of Gulshan-e-Iqbal گلشنِ اقبال
- Country: Pakistan
- City: Karachi
- District: Karachi East
- Founded: 1966
- Named for: Muhammad Iqbal
- Time zone: UTC+5 (PST)
- Postal code: 75300

Gulshan-e-Iqbal (Urdu: گلشنِ اقبال) is a large middle-class to upper middle class (Block 1, 2, 3, 4, 5, 6, 7, 8, 9, 10, 11, 12, 13, 14, 15, 16, 17, 18, 19, 20) residential and commercial neighborhood in the Karachi East district of Karachi, Sindh, Pakistan. It was previously administered as part of the Gulshan Town borough, which was disbanded in 2011.

== History ==
Gulshan-e-Iqbal was populated in 1966 under Scheme 24 of Karachi Development Authority. The name "Gulshan-e-Iqbal" means "the garden of Iqbal", referring to the national poet of Pakistan, Allama Muhammad Iqbal. It has notable gardens.

The municipal infrastructure of Gulshan-e-Iqbal has been in poor condition since 1992. Gulshan Block 1 Area streets (1-5), which are behind the famous Practical center, face many difficulties in the rainy season from July to September.

== Demographics ==
According to the 2023 census, it has a total population of 979,502, including, 507,897 male, 470,605 female, and 1000 transgender residents.

=== Population by Mother tongue ===
According to 2023 Pakistani census Gulshan-e-Iqbal hosts diverse range of mothertongues such as Urdu, Sindhi, Punjabi, Pashto, Balochi and many others.

== Subdivisions ==
Gulshan-e-Iqbal is divided in two parts:

- Gulshan-e-Iqbal I
- Gulshan-e-Iqbal II
- Gulshan-e-Iqbal 13D

== Gyms and sports complexes ==
- KMC Women Sports Complex
- Pavilion End Club (late)
- National Sports Academy

== Educational institutions ==
=== Universities ===
- Karachi University
- NED University
- Indus University
- Federal Urdu University
- Iqra University, Gulshan Campus
- Iqra University, Gulshan Campus 2
- ICMA International
- Sir Syed University of Engineering and Technology
- IUSS Gulshan Campus
- UIT University
- Federal Civil Defense Training School
- Al-Kawthar University
- Aligarh Institute of Technology
- Aga Khan University

=== Schools ===
- The Educator School
- Shaheen Public School
- Aitchison Model School
- Air Foundation School System Gulshan Campus
- Al Khair Education Foundation
- Al Khaleej Islamic Education System
- Aligarh Academy
- All Saints School
- Beacon Light Academy Senior Campus
- Beaconhouse Gulshan Primary III
- Credo Preschool & Primary
- Credo School
- Froebel Girls Secondary campus E-115
- Govt. Girls Higher Secondary School
- Little Star Secondary School
- Manhal Education
- National High School
- PakTurk Maarif International Schools & Colleges Girls Campus
- Sadequain Academy
- Seeding Grammar School
- The Academy School, Gulshan Block-7 Campus
- The City School - Gulshan A Level
- The City School Gulshan Junior Campus
- The Froebel's School KG Section
- The Smart School Fatima Jinnah Campus
- Vaila's School For Children With Special Needs
- Happy Home High School
- HHS pre-primary
- The times school
- The orchid school
- The Mama Parsi Girls' Secondary School
- The Vantage School
- Chiniot Islamia Public School
- Taqwa Model School
- Al Badar Higher Secondary School

=== Colleges ===
- Bahria Foundation College
- Govt Degree Science and Commerce College (blk 7)
- SRE College
- Whales College
- Credo College
- Adler College

== Islamic centers ==
- Jamia Masjid & Madrasa Muaz Ibn e Jabal Block 6
- Jamia Masjid e Quba blk 1
- Jamia Masjid e Siddiq e Akbar blk 3
- Masjid o Imambargah Madina-tul-Ilm (Nipa Chowrangi)
- Faizan-e-Madina (An international Islamic center of Dawat-e-Isalmi)
- Jamia Abu Bakr Al-Islamia (block 5)
- Jamia Sattaria Islamia (Nipa Chowrangi)
- Jamia Darasaat (opposite safari park)
- Jamia Ahsan ul Uloom
- Ashraful Madaris (Gulshan Block 2)
- Baitul Mukarram Masjid
- Khanqah Imdadia Ashrafia

== Parks ==
- Safari Park
- Al Huda Park
- Bagh-e- Kausar
- Aziz Bhatti Park
- Sindbad (Rashid Minhas Road)

=== Public parks ===
- Quba Masjid Park blk 1
- Amir Siddiqui Family Park & Ayeza Play Land
- Amir Zaki Shaheed Family Park (also called Family Park Block 5)
- Arshad Ali Sabri Family Park
- Bagh e Rizwan Family Park & Mini Zoo (also called Mehmood Ghaznavi Park)
- Bagh-e-Kausar Family Park
- Children Park KDA
- Future Park Space
- Gulshan Family Park
- Hakeem Muhammad Saeed Play Ground
- Iftikhar Syed Sports Park
- Khwateen Park
- Nariyal Park
- Nasir Hussain Shaheed Family Park
- Social Welfare Society Park
- Tunkey Ground
- Women Sports Complex
- Azfa Altaf Park

== Cemeteries ==
- Haji Leema Khan Gabol Goth graveyard
- Dalmia graveyard
- Graveyard of the Hindu community
- Shorab Goth graveyard
- Yaseenabad graveyard
- Essa Nagri cemetery
- Catija Sultan
- Gulshan-e-Ghazi graveyard

== See also ==
- Gulistan-e-Johar
- Gulzar-e-Hijri
- Moti Mahal
- Nasir Hussein Shaheed Hospital
