= Jinnah Town, Karachi =

Town in Karachi East District, Pakistan

Jinnah Town جناح ٹاؤن
- Town Municipal Corporation
- Country: Pakistan
- Province: Sindh
- Division: Karachi Division
- District: Karachi East
- Established: 7 January 2022

Government
  - Chairman: Rizwan Abdul Sami
- Time zone: UTC+5 (PKT)

Jinnah Town (Urdu: جناح ٹاؤن) is a Town municipal corporation (TMC) within Karachi East District, in the Pakistani city of Karachi. It was constituted in January 2022 as one of five towns formed when Karachi East District was sub-divided under the Sindh Local Government Act 2021.

== Local government ==
The Sindh Local Government Act 2021 replaced the seven existing District Municipal Corporation (DMCs) of Karachi — Korangi, Malir, Keamari, East, West, South and Central, with 26 Town Municipal Corporations comprising 233 union committees. Karachi East District was divided into five TMCs: Sohrab Goth Town, Safoora Town, Gulshan Town, Jinnah Town and Chanesar Town.

Across the five Karachi East TMCs there are 43 union councils and 172 wards in total.

== Composition ==
According to the Sindh government gazette notification of January 2022, Jinnah Town comprises eleven union councils drawn from two pre-existing sub-divisions of Karachi East District:

- From the Ferozabad sub-division: Union Council Nos. 9, 10, 11 and 12.
- From the Jamshed Quarters sub-division: Union Council Nos. 13, 14, 15, 16, 17, 18 and 19.

== Politics ==
Following the 2022 Sindh local government elections, several Karachi TMCs, including Jinnah Town, came under the control of the Jamaat-e-Islami. Rizwan Abdul Sami serves as chairman of Jinnah Town.
