= Thespianz Theatre =

Performing arts organization

Thespianz Foundation
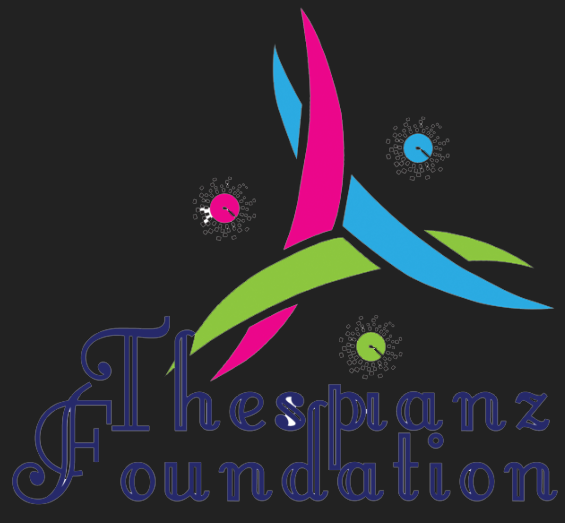
- Thespianx foundation
- Type: Not-for-profit arts organization
- Industry: Entertainment Educational and Social
- Genre: Urdu and English Theatre plays, String Puppet Theatre, street theatre & theatre for peace and spreading love. Performing arts for development
- Founded: Feb 2005 – Karachi, Pakistan
- Founder: Faisal Malik
- Headquarters: Karachi, Pakistan
- Key people: Faisal Malik, Sheikh Sameer Nadeem
- Website: www.thespianzfoundation.org

Thespianz Foundation also known as Thespianz Theatre is a social performing arts organization established in 2005 in Pakistan staged more than 56 social theater, string puppetry and mime plays including education, gender inequality, women's rights drugs prevention, anti book piracy theatre and flash mobs, HIV Aids and water scarcity around the country. All are solely directed by the artistic director Faisal Malik and his associate director Sheikh Sameer Nadeem., who took the Thespianz Foundation troupe to 18 countries around the world

== Revival of String Puppetry ==
Thespianz Foundation revived old dying art of string puppetry in Pakistan and staged Pakistan's biggest string puppetry festival with more than 300 performances in 79 areas of Karachi, Pakistan.

== Pakistan String Puppetry Festival|Pakistan's Biggest String Puppetry Festival ==
In October 2016, Thespianz Foundation organised the Pakistan String Puppetry Festival in Karachi. The festival lasted from October 2016 to January 2017. The festival endeavors to charm audiences, raise awareness and urges the rejection of extremism and violence.

== The Flying Classroom ==
Thespianz Foundation have also run a free mobile classroom in a 25-seater bus called "The Flying Classroom" with the support of German Cultural center Goethe Institut Karachi. In the programme, the children been taught mathematics, Science, English and Urdu on board the bus, 25 students at a time. This way, children who have never been to school have received a basic education.

== Raise of the Organization & Key Person ==
In early years of 2000, Thespianz used to operate from their remote office located in Gulshan-e-Iqbal, until a vibrant young man Nouman Mehmood has joined the mission on an ordinary office support and assistant-level position, even the organizational resources were very limited. gradually he took up one after another responsibility on his own shoulder and furnished his full-fledge support to the chairman "Faisal Malik". Eventually, the chairman became able to allocate his priority for the financial funding of the organization, and within a span of just three years, Thespianz started flourishing with Nouman's own written social comedy theater dramas, presented on his own designed theatrical sets. He proven to be that crucial peer of the organization, who single-handedly run the organizational cycle from grant research to writing grant proposals and even wins a numerous grant fundings including Pakistan String Puppetry Festival which is one of the proofs that clearly shades the light toward a noire but a most valuable asset Thespianz Foundation have had.

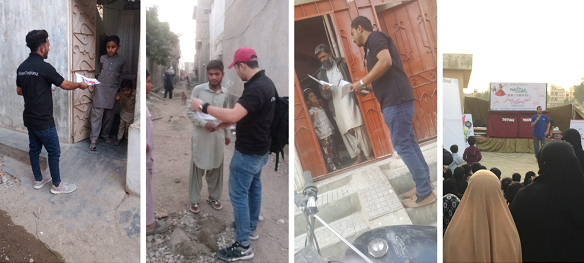
Thespianz – Performed
