= Pir Ilahi Buksh Colony =

Residential neighbourhood locality in Karachi, Pakistan

Coordinates: 24°54′N 67°03′E

PIB Colony پی آئی بی کالونی
- Neighbourhood
- Interactive map of PIB Colony پی آئی بی کالونی
- Country: Pakistan
- City: Karachi
- District: Karachi East
- Time zone: UTC+5 (PKT)
- Postal code: 75300

Pir Ilahi Buksh Colony or Pir Elahi Bux Colony (Urdu: پیر الٰہی بخش کالونی) or PIB Colony (Urdu: پی آئی بی کالونی) is a neighborhood in the Karachi East district of Karachi, Pakistan. It was previously administered as part of the Gulshan Town borough, which was disbanded in 2011. Pir Ilahi Buksh Colony was named after Pir Ilahi Bux, a prominent member of Pakistan Movement who served as Chief Minister of Sindh from 1948 to 1949.

There are several ethnic groups in Pir Ilahi Buksh Colony including Muhajirs, Gujratis, Hyderabadis, Sindhis, Kashmiris, Seraikis, Pakhtuns, Balochis, Memons, Bohras, Ismailis, Khatris, Chhipas, etc. The population of Gulshan Town is estimated to be nearly one million.
