= Chanesar Town =

Neighborhood in Karachi, Pakistan

Coordinates: 24°51′N 67°03′E

Chanesar Goth Chanesar Goth چنیسر گوٹھ
- Neighbourhood
- Interactive map of Chanesar Goth
- Country: Pakistan
- Province: Sindh
- City: Karachi
- District: Karachi East
- Time zone: UTC+5 (PST)
- Postal code: 75300

Chanesar Goth (Urdu: چنیسر گوٹھ) is a neighborhood in Karachi East district of Karachi, Pakistan. It is represented in the provincial legislature by Saeed Ghani. The neighbourhood was previously administered as part of Jamshed Town, which was disbanded in 2011.

== Town Municipal Committee ==
As per the Sindh Local Government Act, 2021, Sindh government replaced the previous seven District Municipal Corporations (DMCs) with 26 towns, each with its own municipal committee. Karachi East District has five towns.

- Safoora Town
- Jinnah Town
- Chanesar Town
- Sohrab Goth Town
- Gulshan Town

== History ==
In 2022, Karachi East District was divided into five towns: Sohrab Goth Town, Safoora Town, Gulshan Town, Jinnah Town and Chanesar Town with 43 union councils and 172 wards.

== Population ==
Chanesar Town has a total population of 600,000.

== Demography ==
Several ethnic groups reside here including Muhajirs, Sindhis, Kashmiris, Saraikis, Pashtuns, Balochis, Memons, Bohras Ismailis and Christians.
