= Abbas Town =

Town in Karachi, Pakistan

- Town
- Abbas
- Location within Pakistan
- Coordinates: 24°56′22″N 67°05′28″E
- Country: Pakistan
- State/Province: Karachi

Abbas Town (Urdu: عباس ٹاؤن) is one of the neighborhoods of Gulshan Town in Karachi, Sindh, Pakistan.

There are several ethnic groups in Abbas Town including Shia Muslim as majority, This town consist of Muhajirs, Sindhis, Punjabis, Saraikis, Pashtuns, Balochis. and others. Over 99% of the population is Muslim with 80% population being Shia Muslims And 19% Sunni Muslims. The population of Gulshan Town is estimated to be nearly one million.

== See also ==
- Gulistan-e-Jauhar
