= Gulshan Town =

Residential town within the city of Karachi, Pakistan

Coordinates: 24°55′N 67°05′E

Gulshan Town گلشن ٹاؤن
- Constituent Town of Karachi
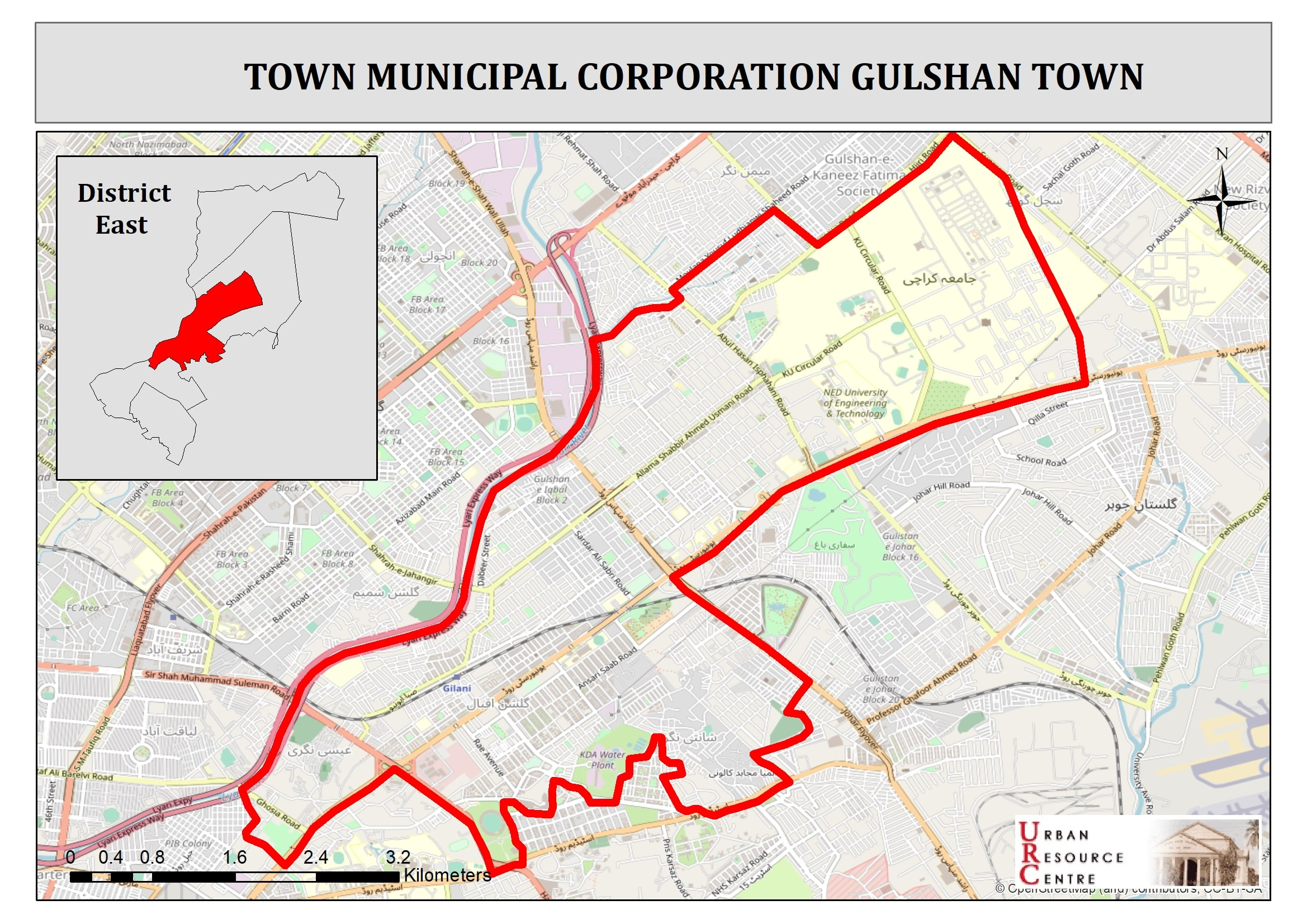
- Country: Pakistan
- Province: Sindh
- District: Gulshan District
- Division: Karachi Division
- Town Chairman: Fauad Ahmed
- Established: 1972; 54 years ago
- Town status: 14 August 2001; 24 years ago
- Disbanded: 11 July 2011; 15 years ago
- Union Committees in Town Municipal Corporation: 08: Essa Nagri Hassan Square Jamali Colony Zia ul Haq Colony New Dhoraji Metroville-III Shanti Nagar National Stadium

Government
  - Type: Government of Karachi
  - Constituency: NA-236 Karachi East-II

Area
  - Total: 29 km^{2} (11 sq mi)
- Elevation: 40 m (130 ft)
- Highest elevation: 175 m (574 ft)
- Lowest elevation: 3 m (9.8 ft)

Population (2023 Pakistani census)
  - Total: 973,314
  - Density: 33,775.93/km^{2} (87,479.3/sq mi)
- Demonym: Karachiite
- Time zone: UTC+05:00 (PKT)
  - Summer (DST): DST is not observed
- ZIP Code: 75300
- NWD (area) code: 021
- ISO 3166 code: PK-SD

Gulshan Town (Urdu: گلشن ٹاؤن) is a Karachi borough in the northeastern part of Karachi.

== Town Municipal Committee ==
As per the Sindh Local Government Act, 2021, Sindh government replaced the previous seven District Municipal Corporations (DMCs) with 26 towns, each with its own municipal committee. Karachi East District has five towns.

- Safoora Town
- Jinnah Town
- Chanesar Town
- Sohrab Goth Town
- Gulshan Town

== History ==
Gulshan Town was formed in 2001 as part of the Local Government Ordinance 2001, and was subdivided into 11 union councils. The town system was disbanded in 2011, and Gulshan Town was reorganized as a subdivision of Karachi East District in 2015. The Karachi Towns were restored in early 2022. According to the 2023 Pakistani census, the population of Gulshan-e-Iqbal Subdivision is 973,314.

In 2022, Karachi East District was divided into five towns namely Sohrab Goth Town, Safoora Town, Gulshan Town, Jinnah Town and Chanesar Town with 43 union councils and 172 wards respectively.

== Location ==
Gulshan Town is bordered by Gadap Town to the north, the Faisal and Malir Cantonments to the east, Jamshed Town to the southwest, and Gulberg and Liaquatabad to the west.

== Background ==
The federal government under Pervez Musharraf, who seized power in a 1999 coup d'etat, introduced local government reforms in the year 2000, which eliminated the previous "third tier of government" (administrative divisions) and replaced it with the fourth tier (districts). The effect in Karachi was the dissolution of the former Karachi Division in 2001, and the merging of its five districts to form a new Karachi City-District with eighteen autonomous constituent towns including Gulshan Town. In 2011, the system was disbanded but remained in place for bureaucratic administration until 2015, when the Karachi Metropolitan Corporation system was reintroduced. In 2015, Gulshan Town was re-organized as a sub-division as part of Karachi East district.

Gulshan-e-Iqbal town was restored as a Town in January 2022, which includes union committees 20, 21, 22, 23, 24, 25, 26 & 28.

Commissioner of Karachi (Syed Darbar Ali Shah) envisioned setting up a new town Gulshan-e-Iqbal on 16 April 1966. It was originally Karachi Development Authority (scheme 24) which was renamed in the name of Pakistan's national poet Allama Muhammad Iqbal. Gulshan Town saw a lot of development after setting up of Civic Centre, Karachi and Karachi Expo Center.

== Demographics ==
The ethnic group in saddar town includes Muhajirs, Sindhis, Punjabis, Pashtuns, Balochs, Saraikis, Kashmiris, Hindkowans, Memons, Bohra, Kutchis and many more

== Neighbourhoods ==
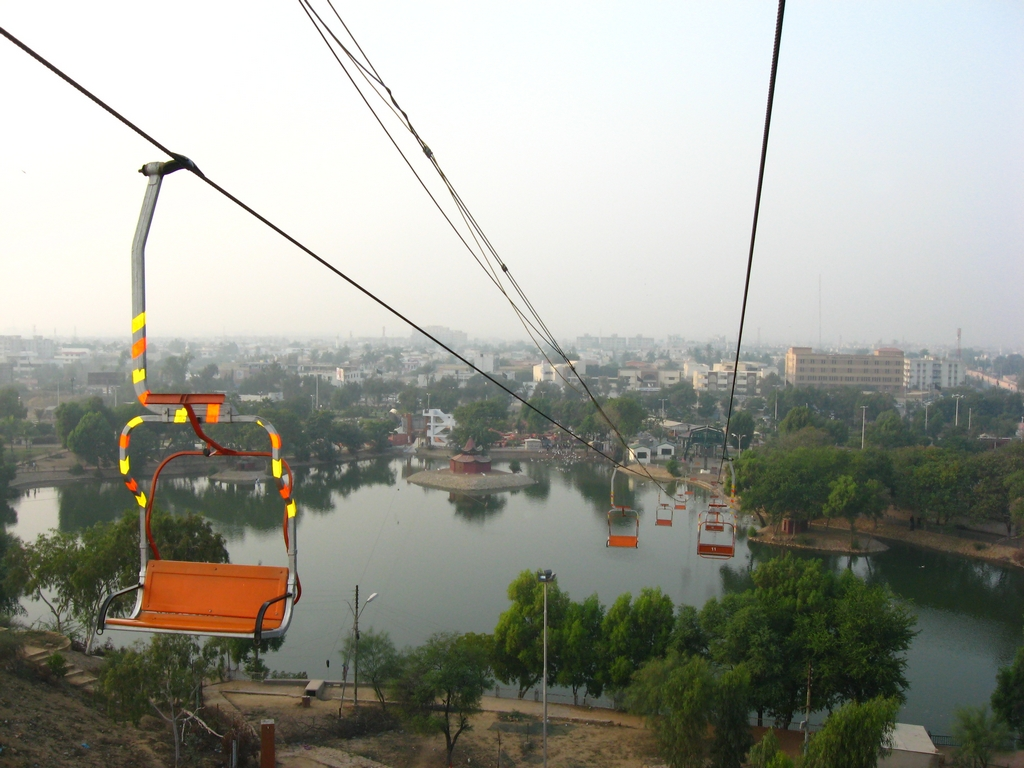
Safari Park

Gulshan Town is the location of the main University of Karachi campus, as well as the offices of the City District Government of Karachi and the Attorney General of Sindh province. There are also a few large parks which includes Aziz Bhatti Park, Askari Park, Aladin Park (now Bagh-e-Karachi) and Safari Park.

- Delhi Mercantile Society
- Essa Nagri
- Bahadurabad
- Hyderabad Colony
- Gulshan-e-Iqbal I
- Gulshan-e-Iqbal II
- Gulzar-e-Hijri
- Gulistan-e-Johar
- Abbas Town
- Kokan Cooperative Housing Society
- Jamali Colony
- Metroville Colony
- Pehlwan Goth
- P.I.B. Colony
- Safoora Goth
- Shanti Nagar
- Sachal Goth
- KESC Society

== Education ==
Gulshan-e-Iqbal area may be called as a university town having more than a dozen of higher education institutions. Few of the major institutions are as follows:

- University of Karachi
- NED University of Engineering and Technology
- Institute of Business Administration, Karachi
- SSUET
- Federal Urdu University
- UIT University
- Aga Khan University
- Liaquat University of Medical & Health Sciences
- Indus University
- Karachi School of Arts
- Iqra University

and several others

== Sports ==
The 15,000-capacity Maulana Muhammad Ali Johar Ground, which is used by football club Karachi United, is located in Gulshan Town.

== See also ==
- Zeenatabad Society
- Sharfabad Society
- Bahadurabad
- City District Government
- Karachi
- Lahore
