= Baitul Mukarram Mosque, Karachi =

Mosque in Karachi, Pakistan

Baitul Mukarram Mosque
- بیت ال مکرّم
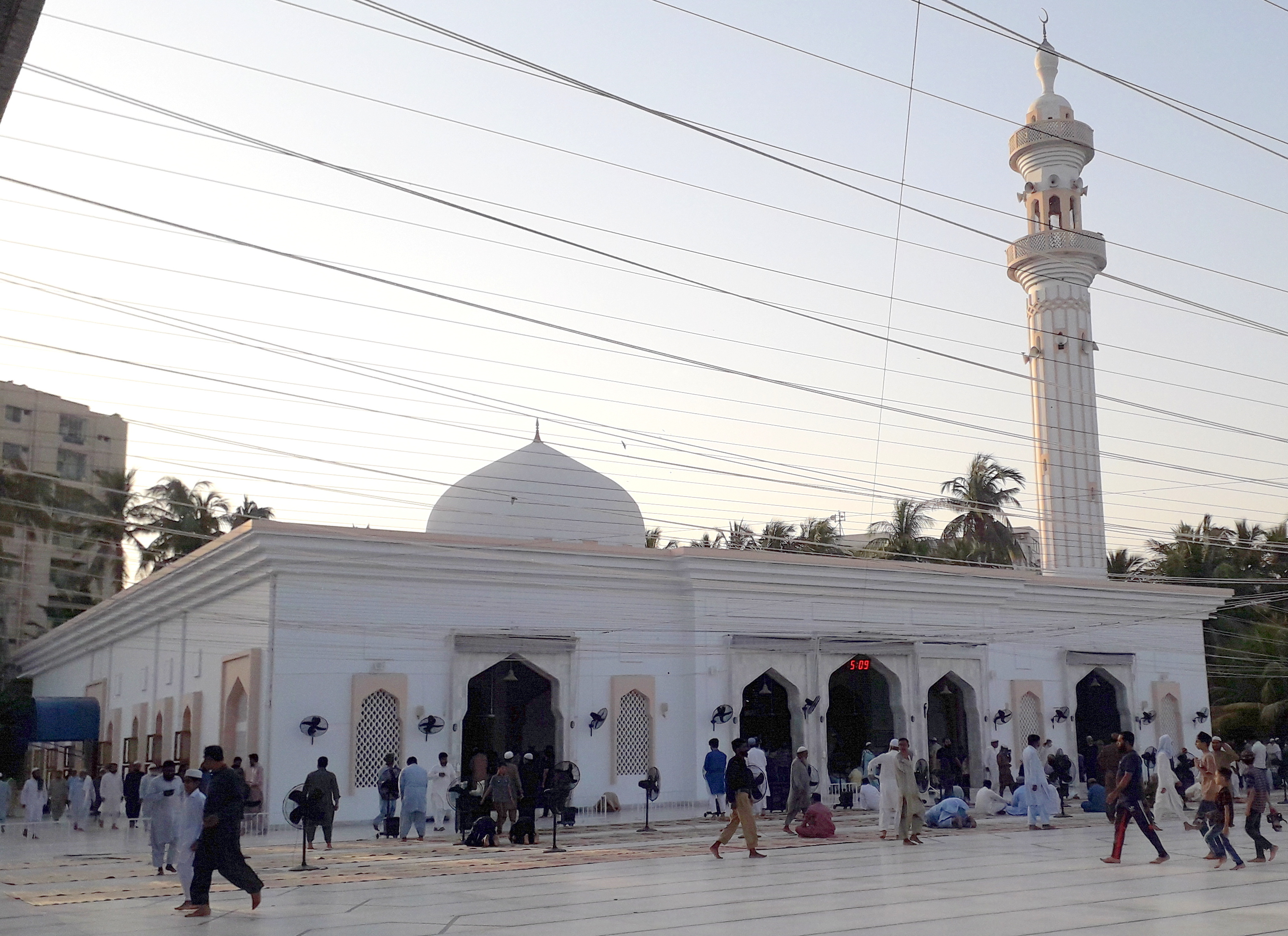

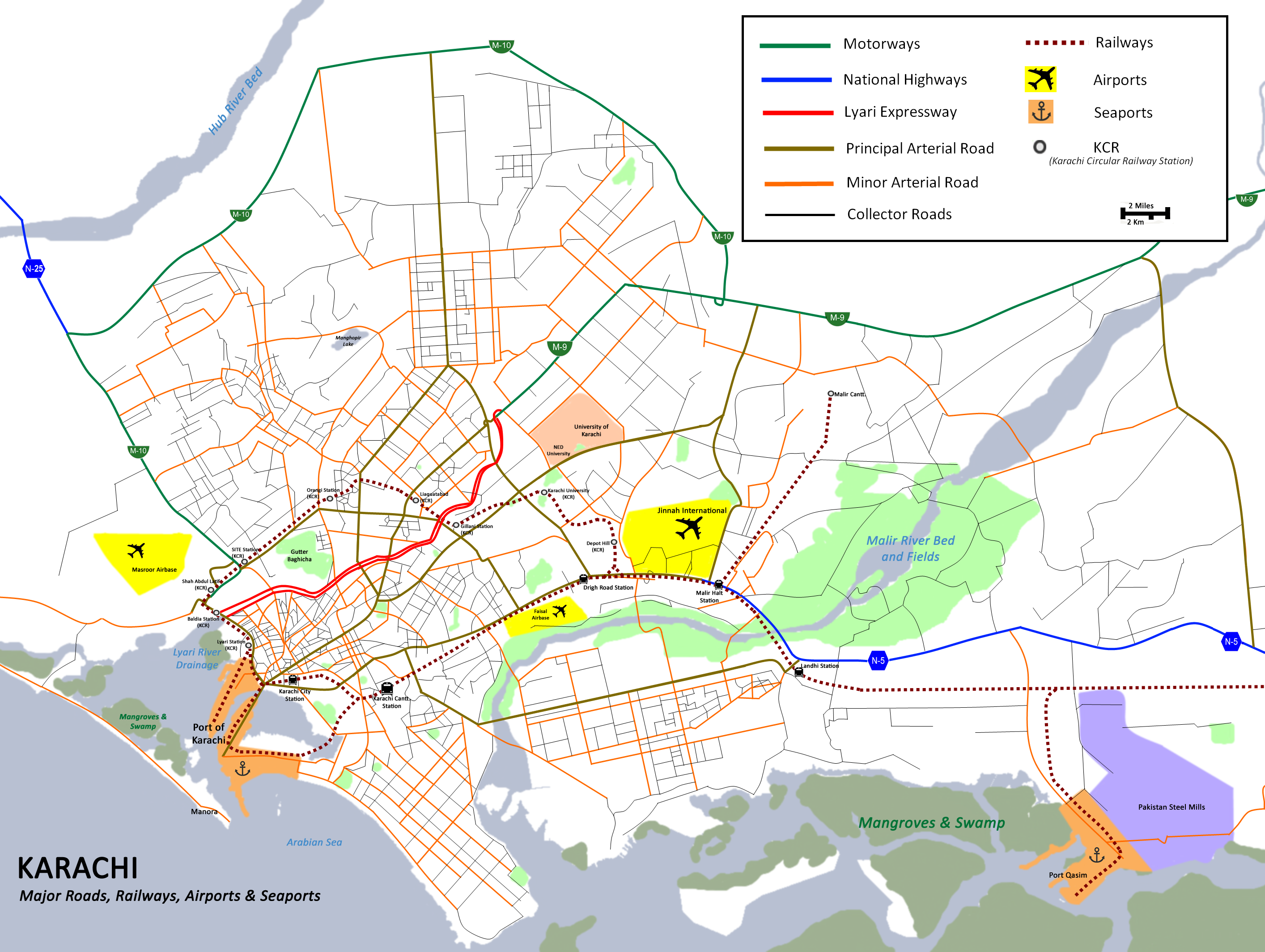
- Location of the mosque in Karachi

Religion
- Affiliation: Islam
- Ecclesiastical or organizational status: Mosque
- Status: Active

Location
- Location: Gulshan-e-Iqbal, Karachi
- Country: Pakistan
- Interactive map of Baitul Mukarram Mosque
- Coordinates: 24°54′27″N 67°04′58″E

Architecture
- Type: Mosque architecture
- Site area: 2.0 ha (5 acres)

The Baitul Mukarram Mosque (Urdu: بیت ال مکرّم) is a mosque in Karachi, Pakistan. It is located in Block 8 Gulshan e Iqbal, Karachi. It is near Urdu University and Expo Center Karachi.

== Overview ==
At the Baitul Mukarram Masjid there is an Islamic educational institute, or madrasa, within the mosque grounds, where students can get Islamic education.

The mosque and its associated area covers approximately 2.0 hectares (5 acres). The mosque has a library, dispensary and an hostel.

== See also ==
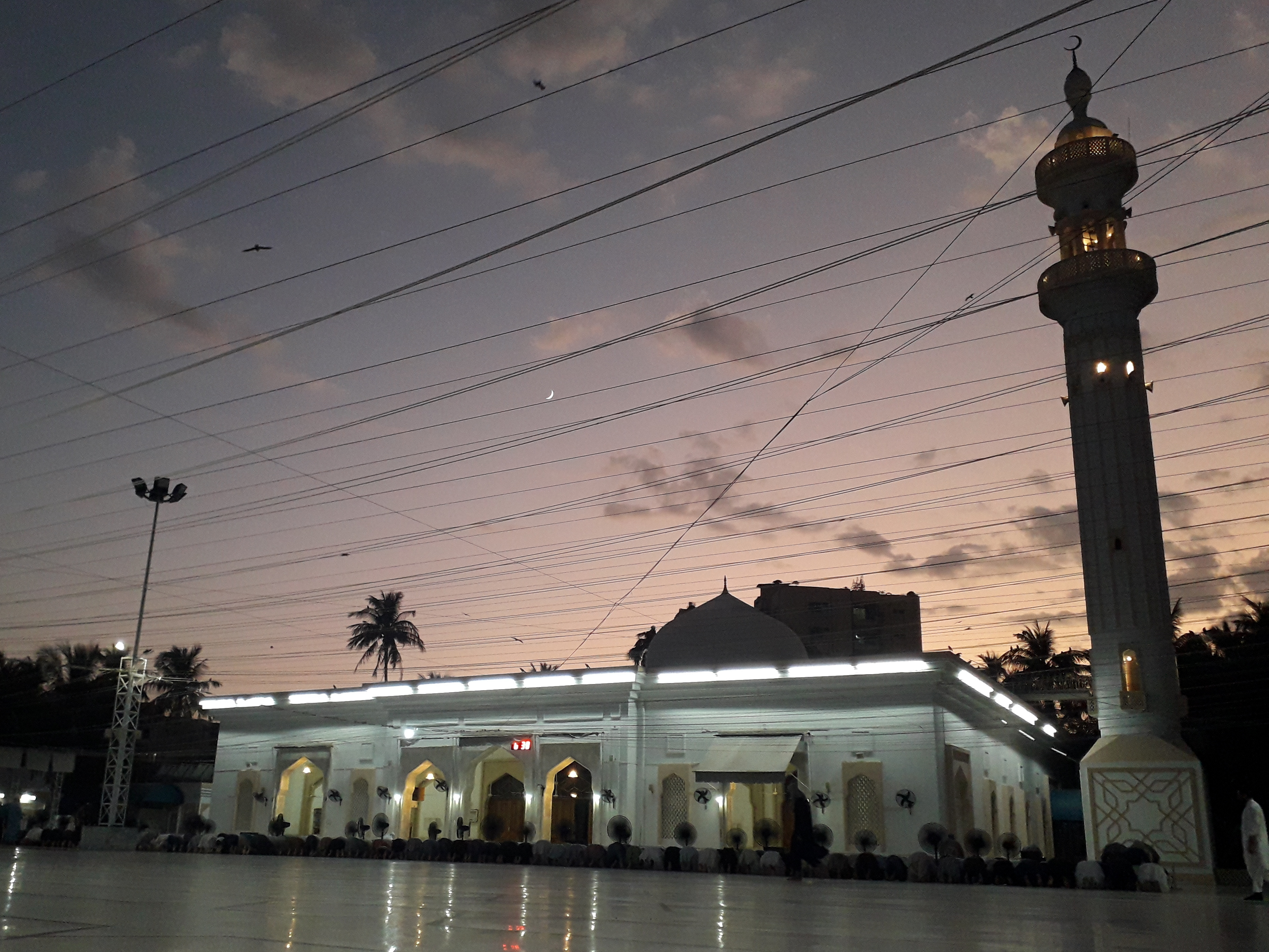
Baitul Mukarram at night

- Islam in Pakistan
- List of mosques in Pakistan
