= Sachal Goth =

Sachal Goth (Urdu: سچل گوٹھ) is one of the neighborhoods of Gulshan Town in Karachi, Sindh, Pakistan.

It is a Sindhi-dominated area, inside the suburb goth Gulshan Town. The other main ethnic groups residing here include Sindhis, Saraikis, Baloch, etc. The population of Gulshan Town is estimated to be nearly one million.
