= Hyderabad Colony =

Residential neighborhood locality in Karachi, Pakistan

Coordinates: 32°08′N 72°38′E

Hyderabad Colony (Urdu: نو آبادی حیدر آباد ) is a residential neighborhood of Gulshan Town, Karachi, Sindh, Pakistan.

Hyderabad Colony was originally inhabited by the Hyderabadi Muhajirs from the princely state of Hyderabad Deccan in British Raj.

It is famous for its popular Hyderabadi food, including Hyderabadi biryani, chaakna, Hyderabad Haleem and especially achar (pickle). Abu Mian, a catering service popular among the Hyderabadis of Karachi, is located in Hyderabad Colony.
