= Metroville Colony =

Coordinates: 24.940°N 67.117°E

Metroville Colony میٹروویل کالونی
- Neighbourhood
- Interactive map of Metroville Colony میٹروویل کالونی
- Country: Pakistan
- City: Karachi
- District: Karachi East
- Time zone: UTC+5 (PST)
- Postal code: 75300

Metroville Colony (Urdu: میٹروویل کالونی) is a neighborhood in the Karachi East district of Karachi, Pakistan. It was previously administered as part of the Gulshan Town borough, which was disbanded in 2011. The largest part of the neighbourhood contains the main campuses of the University of Karachi, NED University of Engineering and Technology and Education Hub Collegiate.

There are several ethnic groups in Metroville Colony including Muhajirs, Sindhis, Punjabis, Ismailis, Kashmiris, Seraikis, Pakhtuns, Balochis, Bohras and Christians.
