= Sohrab Goth Town =

Human settlement in Pakistan

Coordinates: 24°57′N 67°05′E

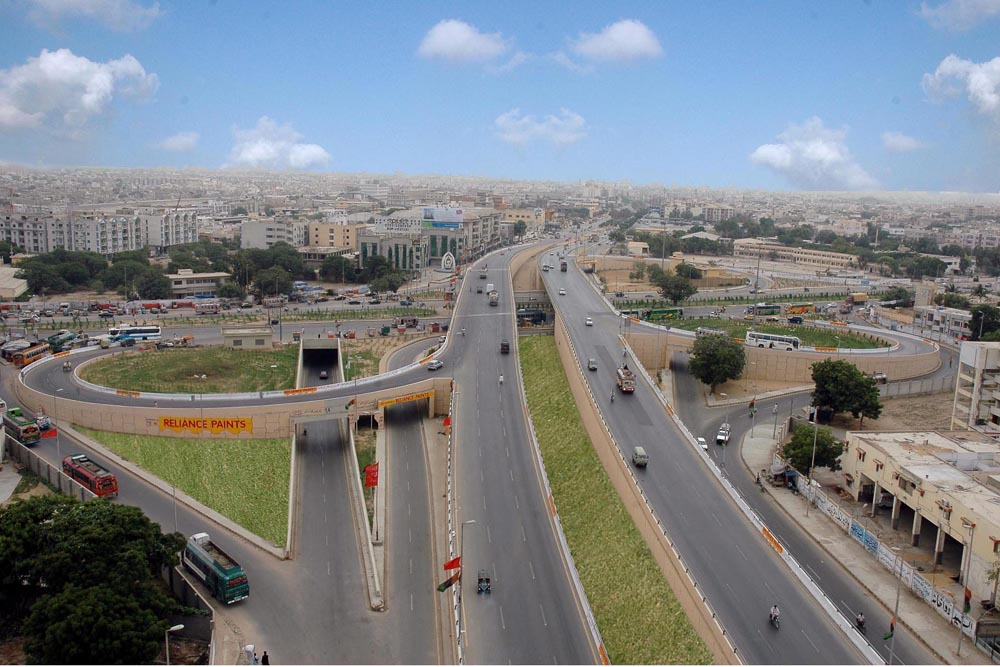
A view of the Sohrab Goth interchange

Sohrab Goth Town (Urdu: سہراب گوٹھ) is a suburban area in the Malir district of Karachi, Pakistan, that previously was a part of Gadap Town until 2011. It acts as an entry point to Karachi from the rest of Pakistan. A bridge over the Lyari River connects other areas of Karachi to Sohrab Goth. The construction of the bridge started in 2000 and was completed in 2006.

== Town Municipal Committee ==
As per the Sindh Local Government Act, 2021, Sindh government replaced the previous seven District Municipal Corporations (DMCs) with 26 towns, each with its own municipal committee. Karachi East District has five towns.

- Safoora Town
- Jinnah Town
- Chanesar Town
- Sohrab Goth Town
- Gulshan Town

== History ==
The 2019 Azadi March commenced from this city.

In 2022, Karachi East District was divided into five towns namely Sohrab Goth Town, Safoora Town, Gulshan Town, Jinnah Town and Chanesar Town with 43 union councils and 172 wards respectively.

== Population ==
Sohrab Goth Town has a total population of 428,000.

== Demography ==
ethnic-groups include Sindhi, Pashtuns , Muhajirs, Punjabis, Kashmiris, Saraikis, Balochs, Memons, etc. A large number of Afghan migrants shifted to sohrab goth town during the War in Afghanistan Although after 2025 Afghanistan-Pakistan conflict many of these afghans were forced to deport approximately 15,000+ afghans were removed and deported back to Afghanistan from sohrab goth areas such as Afghan camp and Yasrab colony.
