= Shanti Nagar =

Neighbourhood in Karachi

Shanti Nagar شانتی نگر
- Neighbourhood
- District: Karachi East
- City: Karachi
- Country: Pakistan
- Time zone: UTC+5 (PST)
- Postal code: 75300

Shanti Nagar (Urdu: شانتی نگر) is a neighborhood in the Karachi East district of Karachi, Pakistan. It is part of the Gulshan Town.

The several ethnic groups living in Shanti Nagar include Kutchi, Muhajirs, Sindhis, Kashmiris, Seraikis, Pakhtuns, Balochis, Memons, Bohras, Ismailis, etc. Over 85% of the population is Muslim. The population of Gulshan Town is estimated to be nearly one million. Shanti Nagar also has Hindu and Christian population. The neighbourhood comprises 12 localities with a population of over 100,000 people.

== Shanti Nagar 72/10-R, Khanewal, Punjab - Pakistan: massacre ==
On February 7, 1997, a mob estimated as large as 30,000 Muslim fundamentalists attacked the Christian-majority town during Ramadan. The violence was triggered by a rumour that a Christian man had desecrated the Quran. An investigation by the Human Rights Commission of Pakistan determined that 775 homes were burned, along with several churches and schools.
