= Essa Nagri =

Eissa Nagri عیسیٰ نگری
- Neighbourhood
- Country: Pakistan
- City: Karachi
- District: Karachi East
- Time zone: UTC+5 (PST)
- Postal code: 75300

Eissa Nagri or Issa Nagri or Essa Nagri or Isa Nagri (Urdu: عیسیٰ نگری) is a neighborhood in the Karachi East district of Karachi, Pakistan. It was previously administered as part of the Gulshan Town borough, which was disbanded in 2011. Eissa or Issa or Isa is the name for Jesus in Arabic and many South Asian languages.

The colony started in 1962 when 85 Christian families migrated from Punjab in search of jobs. There is a large Christian population in this neighborhood of Karachi. The original Eissa Nagri is mainly a Christian area. The biggest churches are the Roman Catholic Church, United Presbyterian Church, Seventh Day Adventist Church, and the Philadelphia Pentecostal Church. Eissa Nagri literally means City of Jesus. Eissa Nagri is situated along Sir Shah Suleiman Road in Gulshan Town.

There are several ethnic groups in Gulshan Town including Muhajirs, Sindhis, Punjabis, Kashmiris, Saraikis, Pashtuns, Balochis, Memons, etc. 10% of the population is Muslim and 90% is Christian. The locality has a Catholic church and missionary schools in this area. The population of Eissa nagri is estimated to be over 40 thousand.

Eissa Nagri is now getting biggest market for furniture in Karachi. Which is based on street shops, Mall buildings & illegal encroachment areas.
