= Jamali Colony =

Jamali Colony جمالی کالونی
- Neighbourhood
- Country: Pakistan
- City: Karachi
- District: Karachi East
- Time zone: UTC+5 (PST)
- Postal code: 75300

Jamali Colony (Urdu: جمالی کالونی) is a neighborhood in the Karachi East district of Karachi, Pakistan. It was previously administered as part of the Gulshan Town borough, which was disbanded in 2011.

Several ethnic groups reside in Jamali Colony, including Urdu speakers, Sindhis, Kashmiris, Seraikis, Pakhtuns, Balochs, Memons, Bohras, Ismailis. Over 99% of Gulshan Town's nearly one million population is Muslim.
