= Delhi Mercantile Society =

Residential neighbourhood locality in Karachi, Pakistan

Delhi Mercantile Society دہلی مرکنٹائل سوسائٹی
- Neighbourhood
- Country: Pakistan
- City: Karachi
- District: Karachi East
- Time zone: UTC+5 (PST)
- Postal code: 75300

Delhi Mercantile Society (Urdu: دہلی مرکنٹائل سوسائٹی) in Jamshed Town, is a neighborhood in the Karachi East district of Karachi, Pakistan. It was previously administered as part of the Gulshan Town borough, which was disbanded in 2011.

This neighbourhood was established by the Punjabi Saudagaran-e-Delhi, a community of Punjabi Muslim traders, originally from Delhi, India, who migrated to Pakistan after independence in 1947.

The bulk of the population still comprises the Punjabi Saudagaran-e-Delhi community, but like other areas of the city due to commercialisation, Delhi mercantile now consists of all groups and ethncities of Karachi.

== See also ==
- Jamiat-e-Punjabi-Saudagaran-e-Delhi
