= Habib University =

University in Karachi, Pakistan

Coordinates: 24.90515°N 67.137740°E

- Motto: قيمة كل امرىء ما يحسنه
- Motto in English: Every Human Being’s worth is in their Yohsin (thoughtful self-cultivation)
- Type: Private
- Established: 2014; 12 years ago
- Accreditation: Higher Education Commission (Pakistan)
- Academic affiliations: HEC; PEC; NCEAC
- Endowment: USD. 40 million
- Chancellor: Muhammad H. Habib
- President: Wasif Rizvi
- Vice-president: Dr. Shahid Shaikh
- Academic staff: 24
- Total staff: 88
- Students: 1,323
- Colors: Eminence, mandalay, and white
- Website: habib.edu.pk

Habib University (HU) (Urdu: جامعۂ حبیب) undergraduate-only liberal arts and sciences university located in Karachi, Sindh, Pakistan.

Funded by the House of Habib, the Habib University Foundation was established in 2010, and was chartered in 2012 as an independent university. Based on a 45,740 square meters campus in Gulistan-e-Jauhar, Karachi, it is a multi-disciplinary university offering undergraduate degree's in science, engineering, arts, humanities and social sciences. It has a strong liberal arts focus and requires all its students to take a set of liberal arts courses consisting of sociology, history, philosophy and anthropology.

== History ==
In 2010, the House of Habib formed the Habib University Foundation (a not-for-profit organization). The project was launched with a grant of US$40 million. Construction on the campus in Gulistan-e-Jauhar, Karachi began in 2012 and classes began in 2014.

The university has a joint venture contract with Texas A&M University at Qatar for reciprocal sharing of institutional experience and has signed a partnership agreement for the association.

HU's first class of undergraduate students began in August 2014. The HU Talent Outreach Program (TOPS), launched in 2016, provides selected students with a 100% tuition fee waiver for four-year undergraduate program. The HU Equal Opportunity Program (EOP), launched in 2025, provides selected students with a fee waiver up to 80% financial support for a four-year undergraduate program. Wasif Rizvi is the founding President of the University. The university's chief academic officer is Dr. Muhammad Shahid Shaikh who serves as Vice President for Academic Affairs (VPAA) and Dean of Faculty.

== Campus ==
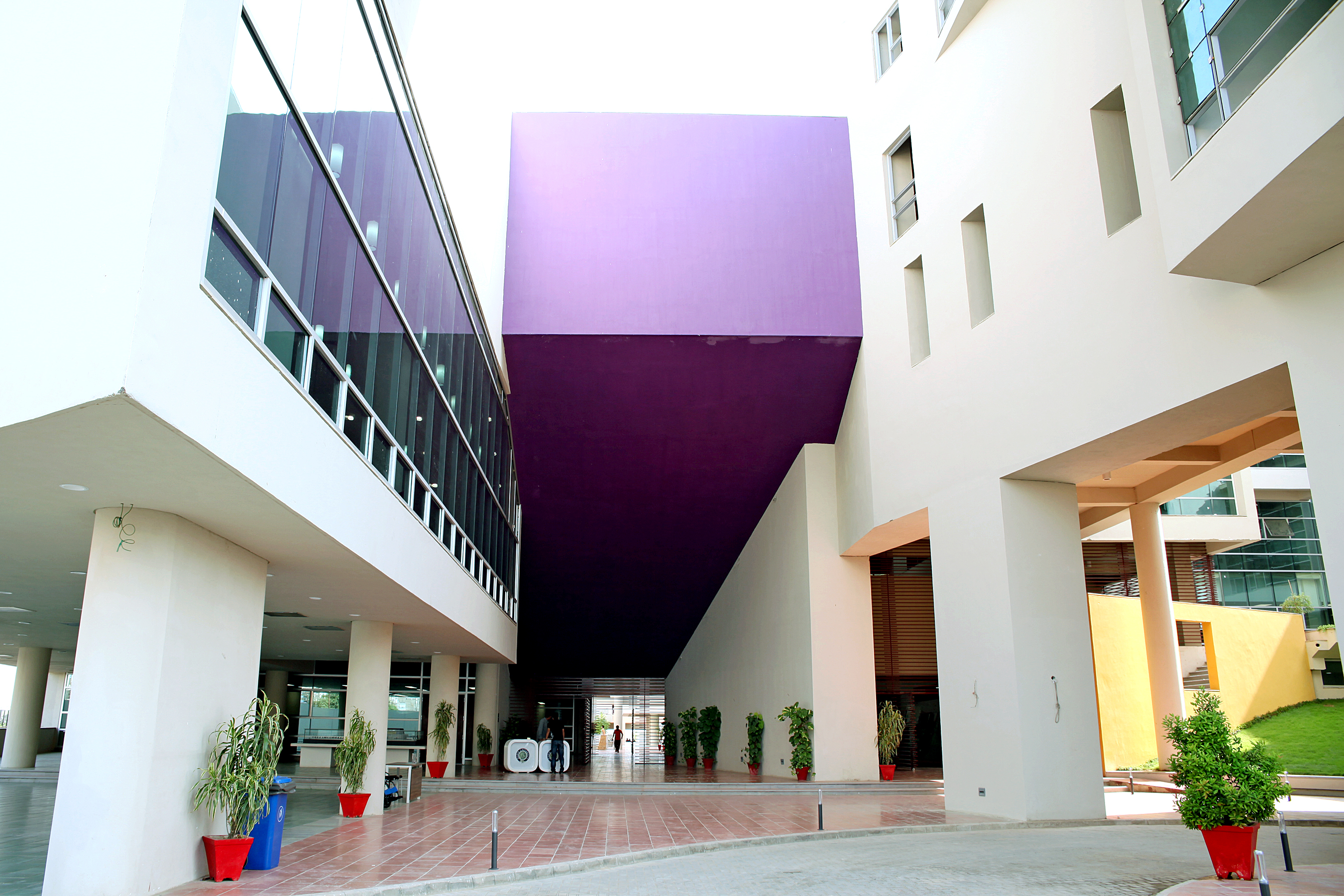

The university's campus is located behind the Jinnah International Airport runway and covers an area of around 27,480 m^{2} (295,800 sq ft). The campus is noted for being one of the few wheelchair-accessible campuses in the city and is a non-residential campus. The university's laboratories are designed and furnished by Research Facilities Design. In 2010 the campus design won the Merit Award for Excellence in Planning for New Campus from the Society for College and University Planning (SCUP).

The university's central auditorium covers 2,322 m^{2} (24,990 sq ft) of area, and seats over 300 persons. In addition, the university holds two lecture halls, the Tariq Rafi Lecture Theatre which holds 300 students and the Soorty Lecture Theatre which holds 60 seats. The campus includes several classrooms with not more than 20 seats each. The university also includes an amphitheater which covers an area of 418 m^{2} (4,500 sq ft). The Habib library covers an area of 1,950 m^{2} (21,000 sq ft) and is a semi-public space and is home to information commons, lounges, and discussion rooms.

== Academics ==
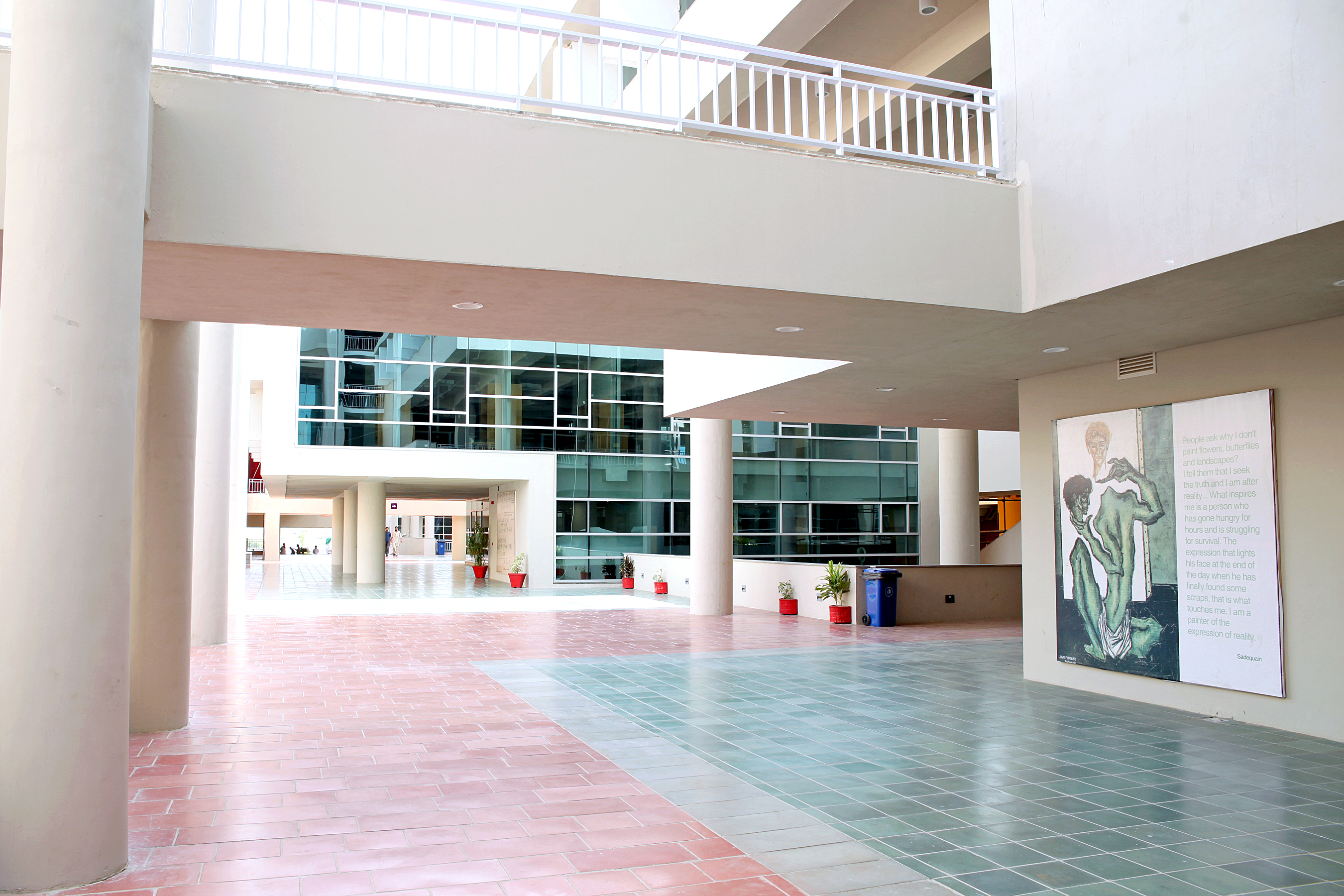

The university incorporates a liberal arts education with cultural sensitivity within its curriculum. It is mandatory for every student studying there to follow the liberal arts curriculum in all its offered courses. In addition to local regional languages, all students are required to study a liberal arts curriculum comprising sociology, history, philosophy – Western, Eastern and Islamic – and anthropology. The university terms this a Habib Liberal Core based on 7 Forms of Thought.

The university offers 6 majors across two schools: the Dhanani School of Science and Engineering and the School of Arts, Humanities and Social Sciences. The majors include Computer Science, Computer Engineering, Electrical Engineering, Social Development & Policy, Communication & Design and Comparative Humanities. All classes are modeled after a tutorial system which includes small classes of 12 students.

The university has affiliations with Stanford University, Pitzer College, University of Michigan, University of California, Berkeley, and Texas A&M University; allowing students to attend summer sessions at these universities. It has a student to teacher ratio of 12:1, and, as of 2016, has 1,000 full-time students. The university is regarded as among Pakistan's most progressive education institute.

=== Yohsin Lecture Series ===
Yohsin Lecture Series is a public lecture series modeled after the public lecture series of the London School of Economics. The Inaugural Yohsin Lecture was delivered by Dr. Munir Fasheh in November 2011. Other prominent speakers have included: the former Dean for SAIS at the Johns Hopkins University, Dr. Vali Nasr, MIT Professor Deborah K. Fitzgerald, Gayatri Chakravorty Spivak, Reza Aslan, Noam Chomsky, Ashis Nandy, Dr. Azra Raza, Dr. Thomas Blom Hansen and Nergis Mavalvala.

== People ==
Notable people associated with the university include:

- Haziqul Khairi, an eminent jurist who served as Chief Justice of the Federal Shariat Court, Member Board of Governors.
- Asif Farrukhi (1959-2020), Associate Professor.

== See also ==
- List of universities in Pakistan
- Gulistan-e-Jauhar
- House of Habib
