= Gulzar-e-Hijri =

Gulzar-e-Hijri گُلزارِ ہجری
- Neighbourhood
- Scheme 33
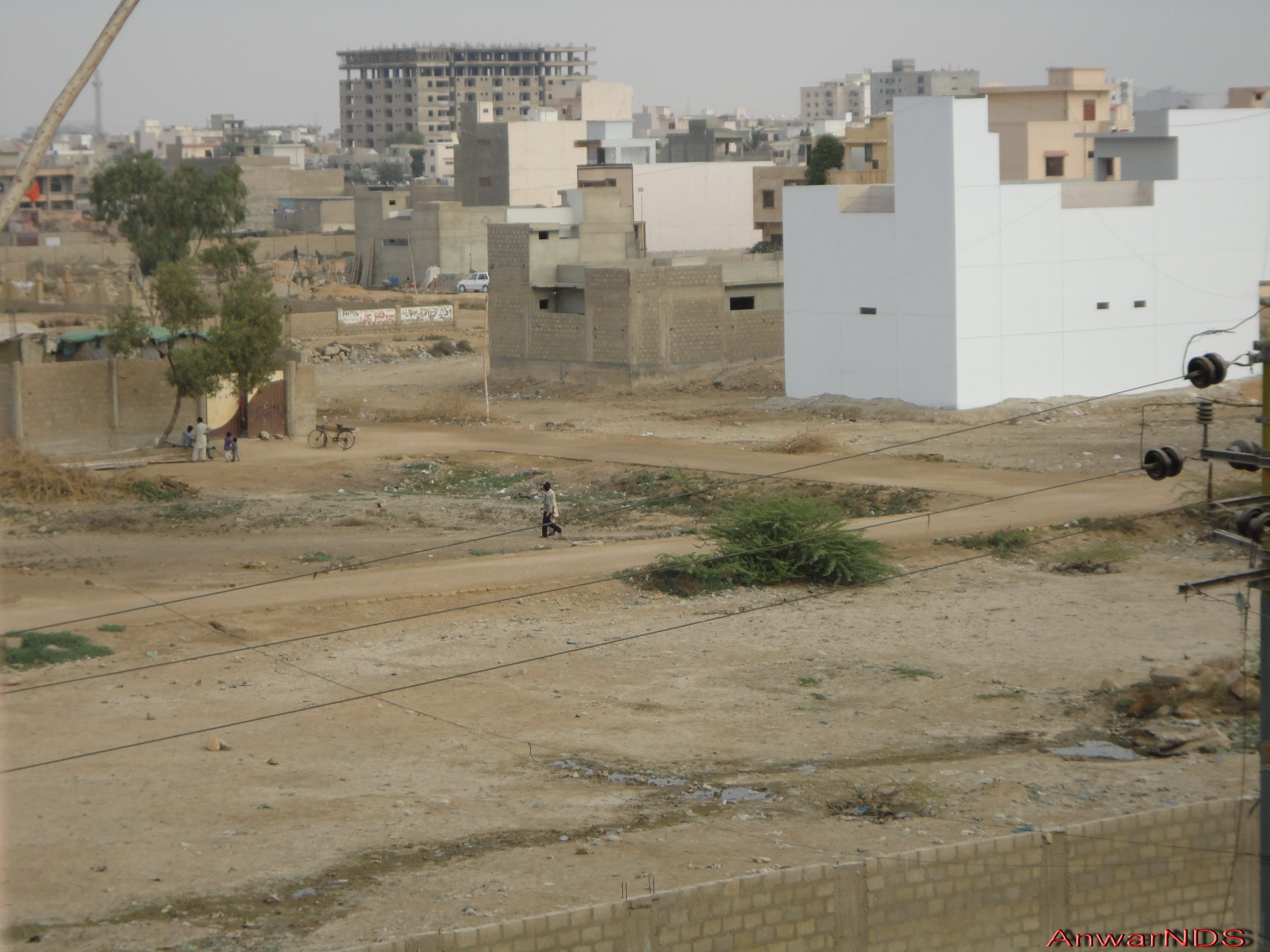
- Gulzar-e-Hijri, Karachi

- Location in Pakistan
- Coordinates: 24.955°N 67.125°E
- Country: Pakistan
- City: Karachi
- District: Karachi East

Area
  - Total: 23 km^{2} (8.9 sq mi)
- Time zone: UTC+5 (PST)
- Postal code: 75300

Gulzar-e-Hijri or Scheme 33 (Urdu: گُلزارِ ہجری یا سکیم 33) is a neighborhood in the Karachi East district of Karachi, Pakistan. It was previously administered as part of the Gulshan Town borough, which was disbanded in 2011.

Under the new local government system, Gulzar-e-Hijri lies in District East. A large part of Gulzar-e-Hijri is along the Karachi-Hyderabad Motorway (M-9).

== Schools and Colleges ==
- Dow College of Pharmacy
- Dow International Medical College
- Kiran Hospital
- Memon College of Nursing
- Beaconhouse School System, Madras Chowk
- Pakistan Institute of Professional Science & Technology
- Ghazi Foundation School

== Demographics ==
The ethnic group in saddar town includes Muhajirs, Sindhis, Punjabis, Pashtuns, Balochs, Saraikis, Kashmiris, Hindkowans, Memons, Bohra, Cutchis and many more.

== See also ==
- Gulshan-e-Iqbal
- Gulistan-e-Johar
