= Pehlwan Goth =

Residential neighbourhood in Karachi, Pakistan

Coordinates: 24.910102°N 67.141832°E

Pehlwan Goth پہلوان گوٹھ
- Neighbourhood
- Interactive map of Pehlwan Goth پہلوان گوٹھ
- Country: Pakistan
- City: Karachi
- District: Karachi East
- Time zone: UTC+5 (PST)
- Postal code: 75300

Pehlwan Goth (Urdu: پہلوان گوٹھ) is a neighborhood in the Karachi East district of Karachi, Pakistan. It was previously administered as part of the Gulshan Town borough, which was disbanded in 2011.

The neighborhood is home to several ethnic groups, including Sindhis as majority, Muhajirs, Punjabis, Saraikis, Pashtuns, Balochis, etc. Over 95% of the population is Muslim; among other religious believers, Christians comprise around 5% of the total population. The population of Gulshan Town is estimated to be nearly one million.

== See also ==
- Gulistan-e-Jauhar
