= Karachi East District =

Administrative district in Pakistan

Karachi East District کراچی مشرقی ضلع
- District of Karachi
- Karachi East
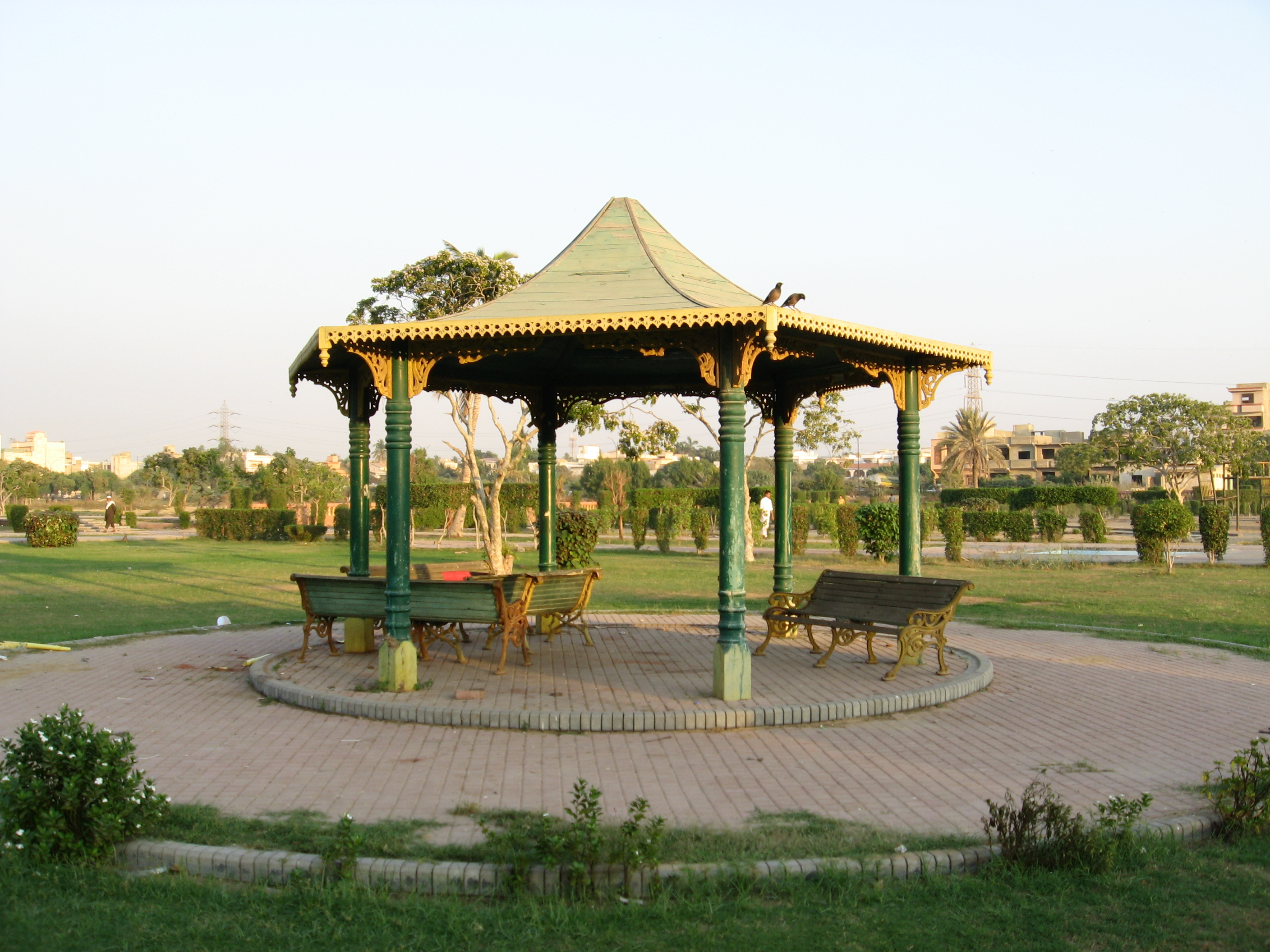
- Aziz Bhatti Park, Gulshan-e-Iqbal Town
- Etymology: District East
- Map of Gulshan District (Karachi East)
- Coordinates: 24.8844°N 67.1443°E
- Country: Pakistan
- Province: Sindh
- Division: Karachi
- Established: August 1972; 54 years ago
- Abolished: August 2001; 25 years ago (CDGK)
- Restored: 11 July 2011; 15 years ago
- Headquarters: DC East office
- Towns: 4: Jamshed Town; Gulshan Town; Chanesar Town; Jinnah Town

Government
  - Type: District Administration
  - Body: Government of Karachi
  - Constituency: NA-235 Karachi East-I; NA-236 Karachi East-II; NA-237 Karachi East-III; NA-238 Karachi East-IV
  - Deputy Commissioner: Altaf Sheikh

Area
  - Total: 139 km^{2} (54 sq mi)

Population (2023)
  - Total: 3,913,656
  - Density: 28,417/km^{2} (73,600/sq mi)
- Demonym: Karachiite

Literacy
  - Literacy rate: Total: 80.07%; Male: 81.31%; Female: 78.65%
- Time zone: UTC+05:00 (PKT)
  - Summer (DST): DST is not observed
- ZIP Code: 75300
- NWD (area) code: 021
- ISO 3166 code: PK-SD
- CNIC Code of Gulshan District: 42201-XXXXXXX-X
- Website: www.dmceast.gos.pk

Karachi East District (Urdu: کراچی مشرقی ضلع) is an administrative district of Karachi Division created in 1972. As of the 2023 Pakistani census the population of Karachi East is 3,913,656.

In 2023, the Government of Sindh announced its intent to rename Karachi East District to Gulshan District (Urdu: ضلع گلشن) to align with its town name; however, there is as yet no indication that this has taken place.

== History ==
The district was established in 1972.

The district was abolished in 2000 as federal government formed City District Government Karachi as a result Karachi South District was divided into four towns namely:

- Gulshan Town
- Jamshed Town
- Korangi Town
- Shah Faisal Town

On 11 July 2015, the Sindh Government restored Karachi East District.

In November 2013, three eastern towns of Karachi East District separated to form a new District named Korangi also Jamshed Town of Karachi South District was added into this district. Now Karachi East comprises two towns: Jamshed and Gulshan.

In 2022, it was divided into five towns namely Sohrab Goth Town, Safoora Town, Gulshan Town, Jinnah Town and Chanesar Town with 43 union councils and 172 wards respectively.

== Demographics ==
Historical population
Year	Pop.	±% p.a.
1961	...	—
1972	...	—
1981	...	—
1998	1,447,529	—
2017	2,875,315	+3.68%
2023	3,921,742	+5.31%

As of the 2023 census, Karachi East district has 659,389 households and a population of 3,921,742. The district has a sex ratio of 113.51 males to 100 females and a literacy rate of 80.07%: 81.31% for males and 78.65% for females. 933,514 (23.85% of the surveyed population) are under 10 years of age. The entire population lives in urban areas.

Religions in Karachi East district (2023)
Religion	Percent
Islam	95.05%
Christianity	3.10%
Hinduism	1.57%
Other or not stated	0.28%

The majority religion is Islam, with 95.05% of the population. Christianity is practiced by 3.1% and Hinduism (including Scheduled Castes) is practiced by 1.57% of the population.

Languages of Karachi East district (2023)
1. Urdu (49.0%)
2. Sindhi (12.8%)
3. Pashto (11.6%)
4. Punjabi (10.4%)
5. Saraiki (5.92%)
6. Hindko (2.33%)
7. Balochi (1.82%)
8. Others (6.14%)

At the time of the 2023 census, 1,916,767 of the people spoke Urdu, 501,156 spoke Sindhi, 453,464 spoke Pashto, 407,425 Punjabi, 231,523 Saraiki, 91,034 Hindko, 71,312 Balochi and 240,975 others of total 3,913,656 as their first language.

== Administrative Towns in Karachi East ==
Following is the list of administrative towns of Karachi East District.

Jinnah Town
Union Council
U.C. 1 Pakistan Quarters
U.C. 2 Soldier Bazar
U.C. 3 Patel Para
U.C. 4 Jamshed Quarters
U.C. 5 Martin Quarters
U.C. 6 Jamshed Quarters
U.C. 7 Bahadurabad
U.C. 8 Delhi Mercantile
U.C. 9 Tunisia Line
U.C. 10 Jacob Lines
U.C. 11 Behind Jacob Lines

Chanesar Town
Union Council
U.C. 1 P.E.C.H.S. 2 (Pakistan Employees Co-operative Housing Society)
U.C. 2 P.E.C.H.S. 6
U.C. 3 Mahmudabad
U.C. 4 Manzoor Colony
U.C. 5 Manzoor Colony-II
U.C. 6 Jamshed Quarters
U.C. 7 Akhtar Colony
U.C. 8 Chanesar Goth

Sohrab Goth Town
Union Council
U.C. 1 Al-Asif Square
U.C. 2 New Quetta Town
U.C. 3 Sukhiya Goth
U.C. 4 Ayub Goth
U.C. 5 Khadim Hussain Goth
U.C. 6 Ahsanabad
U.C. 7 Yousuf Shah Goth
U.C. 8 Sabzi Mandi

Safoora Town
Union Council
U.C. 1 Abbas Town
U.C. 2 Gulzar-e-Hijri
U.C. 3 Sachal Goth
U.C. 4 Al-Azhar Garden
U.C. 5 Johar Complex
U.C. 6 Pehlwan Goth
U.C. 7 Gulistan-e-Johar
U.C. 8 Safari Park

Gulshan-e-Iqbal Town
Union Council
U.C. 1 Essa Nagri
U.C. 2 Hassan Square
U.C. 3 Jamali Colony
U.C. 4 Zia-ull-Haq Colony
U.C. 5 New Dhoraji
U.C. 6 Metroville-III
U.C. 7 Shanti Nagar
U.C. 8 National Stadium

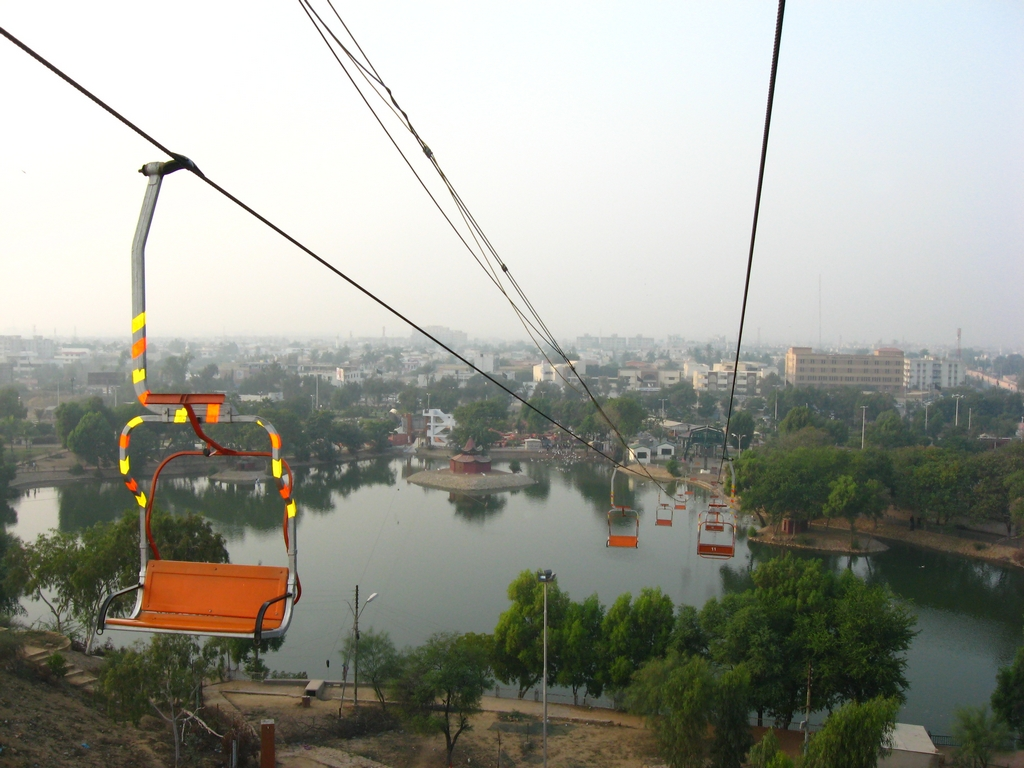
Karachi Safari Park is located in Gulshan Town

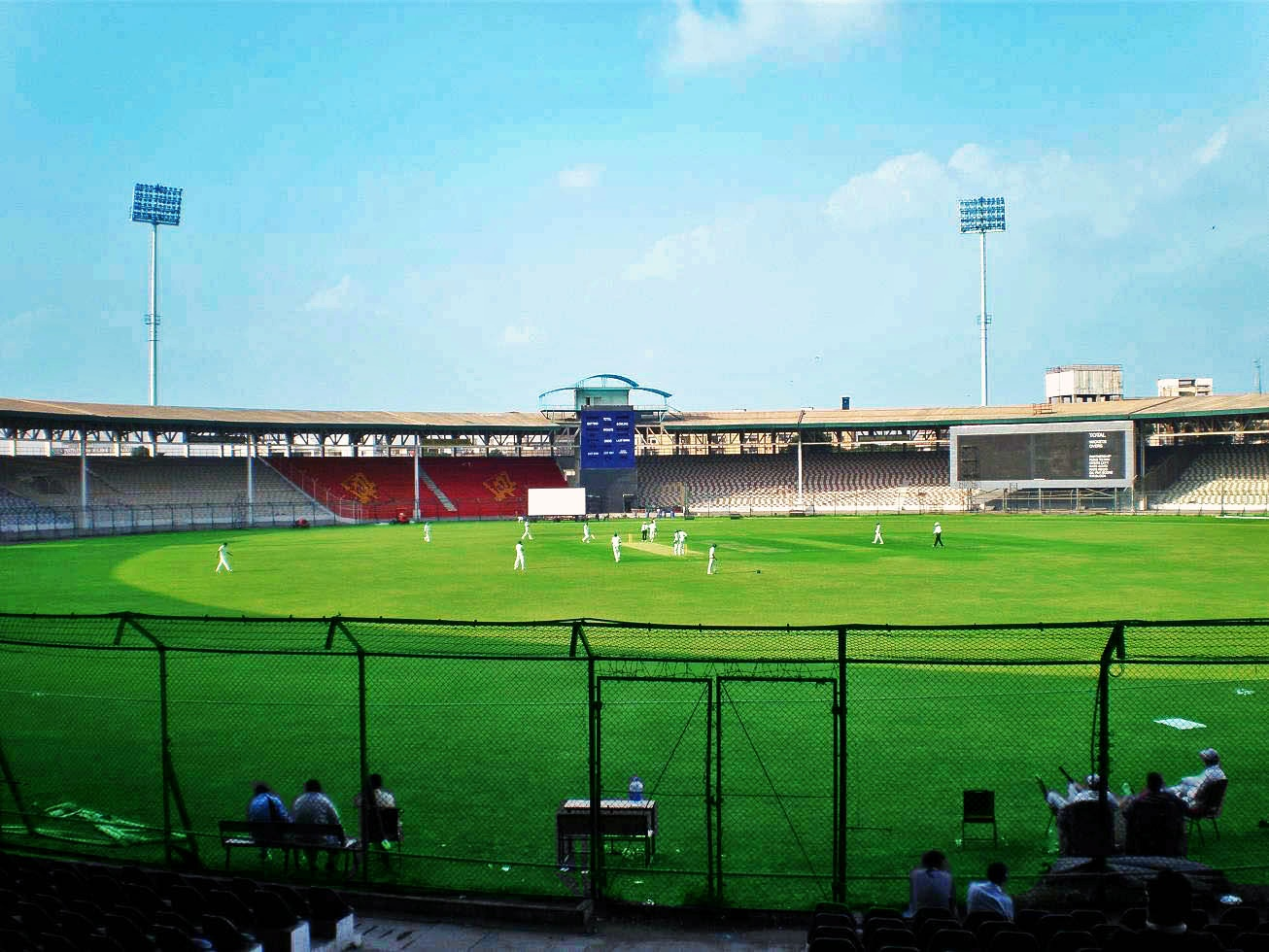
National Cricket Stadium, Karachi

== Hospital and health care facilities ==
There are several healthcare facilities in the East District, such as the Aga Khan University Hospital and Liaquat National Hospital.

== Education Center ==
There are several educational institutions in district east such as NED university of Engineering and Technology, University of Karachi, Dow University of Health Sciences (Ojha Campus) and many other big and small educational facilities.

== See also ==
Karachi
