= Safoora Goth Town =

Karachi neighbourhood

Coordinates: 24.916°N 67.126°E

Safoora Chowk صفورہ چوک
- Neighbourhood
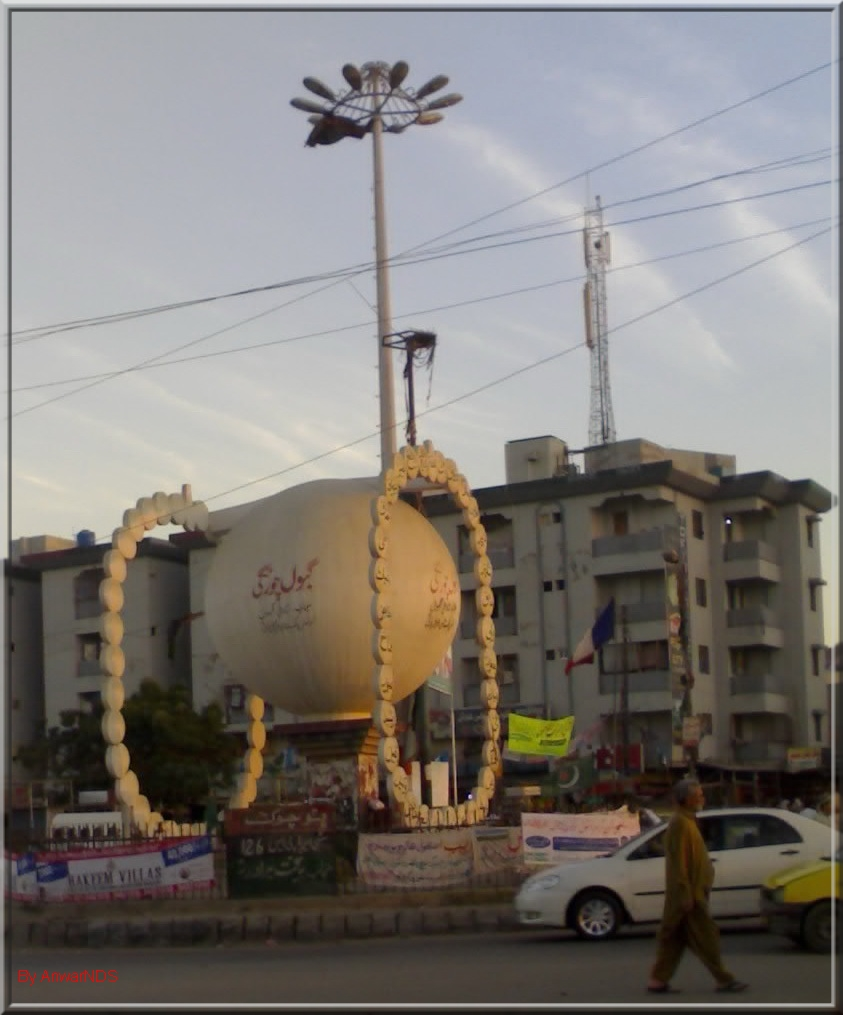
- Safoora Chowrangi, Karachi
- Interactive map of Safoora Chowk صفورہ چوک
- Country: Pakistan
- City: Karachi
- District: Karachi East
- Time zone: UTC+5 (PST)
- Postal code: 75300

Safoora Goth (Sindhi: صفورا گوٹھ) is a neighborhood in the Karachi East district of Karachi, Pakistan.

Safoora Goth or Safoora Chowk was previously administered as part of the Gulshan Town borough.

== Town Municipal Committee ==
As per the Sindh Local Government Act, 2021, Sindh government replaced the previous seven District Municipal Corporations (DMCs) with 26 towns, each with its own municipal committee. Karachi East District has five towns.

- Safoora Town
- Jinnah Town
- Chanesar Town
- Sohrab Goth Town
- Gulshan Town

== History ==
Safoora Town was created in 2022 as part of Karachi East District.

Safoora Town is a neighborhood in Karachi East district of Karachi, Pakistan. It is represented in the by Rashid Khaskheli. The neighbourhood was previously administered as part of Jamshed Town, which was disbanded in 2011.

In 2022, Karachi East District was divided into five towns namely Sohrab Goth Town, Safoora Town, Gulshan Town, Jinnah Town and Chanesar Town with 43 union councils and 172 wards respectively.

Safoora Town has a total population of 600,000.

There are several ethnic groups including Sindhis, Muhajirs, Punjabis, Kashmiris, Seraikis, Pakhtuns, Balochis, Memons, Bohras Ismailis and Christians.

In 2022, Karachi East District was divided into five towns namely Sohrab Goth Town, Safoora Town, Gulshan Town, Jinnah Town and Chanesar Town with 43 union councils and 172 wards respectively.
