= Gulistan-e-Johar =

Residential neighborhood locality in Karachi, Pakistan

Coordinates: 24°56′N 67°08′E

- Neighborhood
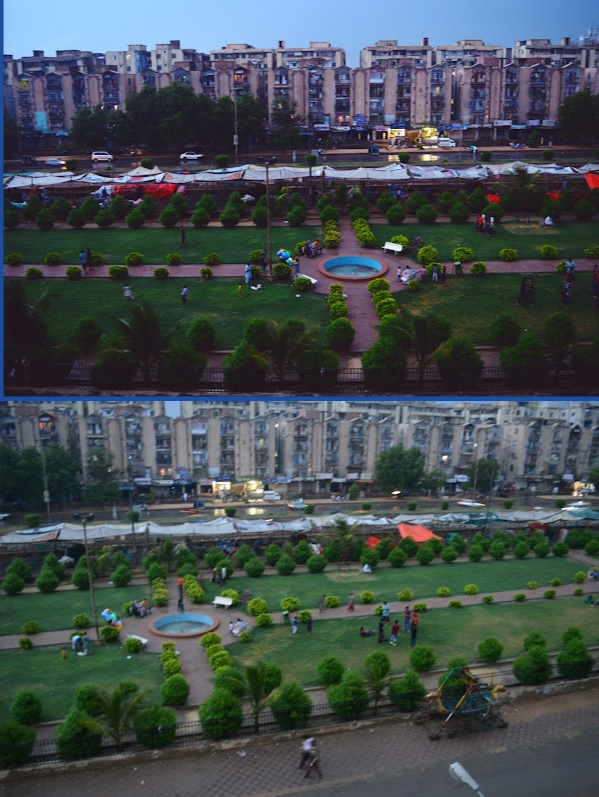
- Interactive map of Gulistan-e-Johar

Gulistan-e-Jauhar or Gulistan-e-Johar (Urdu: گلستانِ جوہر) is a prominent neighborhood in the Karachi East district of Karachi, Pakistan. Gulistan-e-Jauhar ("Garden of Jauhar") is named after Maulana Mohammad Ali Jauhar, a prominent figure in the Pakistan Movement. The neighborhood is made up primarily of apartment blocks.

== Geography ==
Gulistan-e-Jauhar is located on the eastern outskirts of Karachi, between University Road and Rashid Minhas Road. It is neighbored by Safoora Goth, Scheme 33, and Malir Cantonment. The neighborhood is composed of numerous blocks, each with several apartment complexes.

== Demographics ==
Gulistan-e-Jauhar is home to a diverse population representing various ethnicities of Pakistan, including Muhajirs, Sindhis, Pashtuns, Punjabis and Balochs.

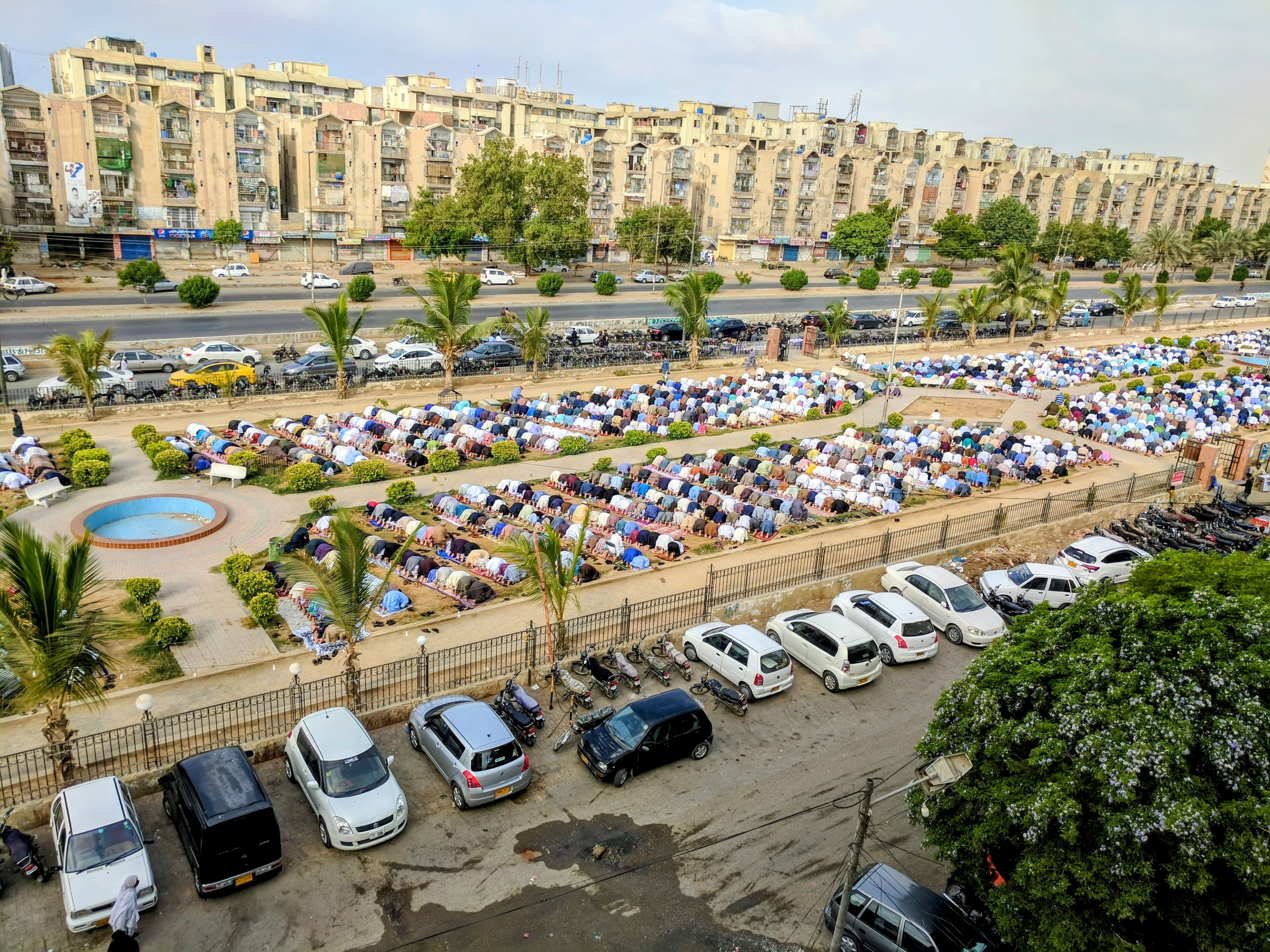
Eid gathering at Gulistan-e-Jauhar Park, Karachi

== Economy ==
The local economy of Gulistan-e-Jauhar is composed mainly of retail, service sector businesses, and some light industry. Fresh fruit and vegetable vendors line the streets everyday.

During the years 2011-2013, the neighborhood suffered significant strife from violence and significant street crime in Karachi. However, since then, the neighborhood has been undergoing significant gentrification. As with the rest of the city of Karachi, street crime still remains an issue.

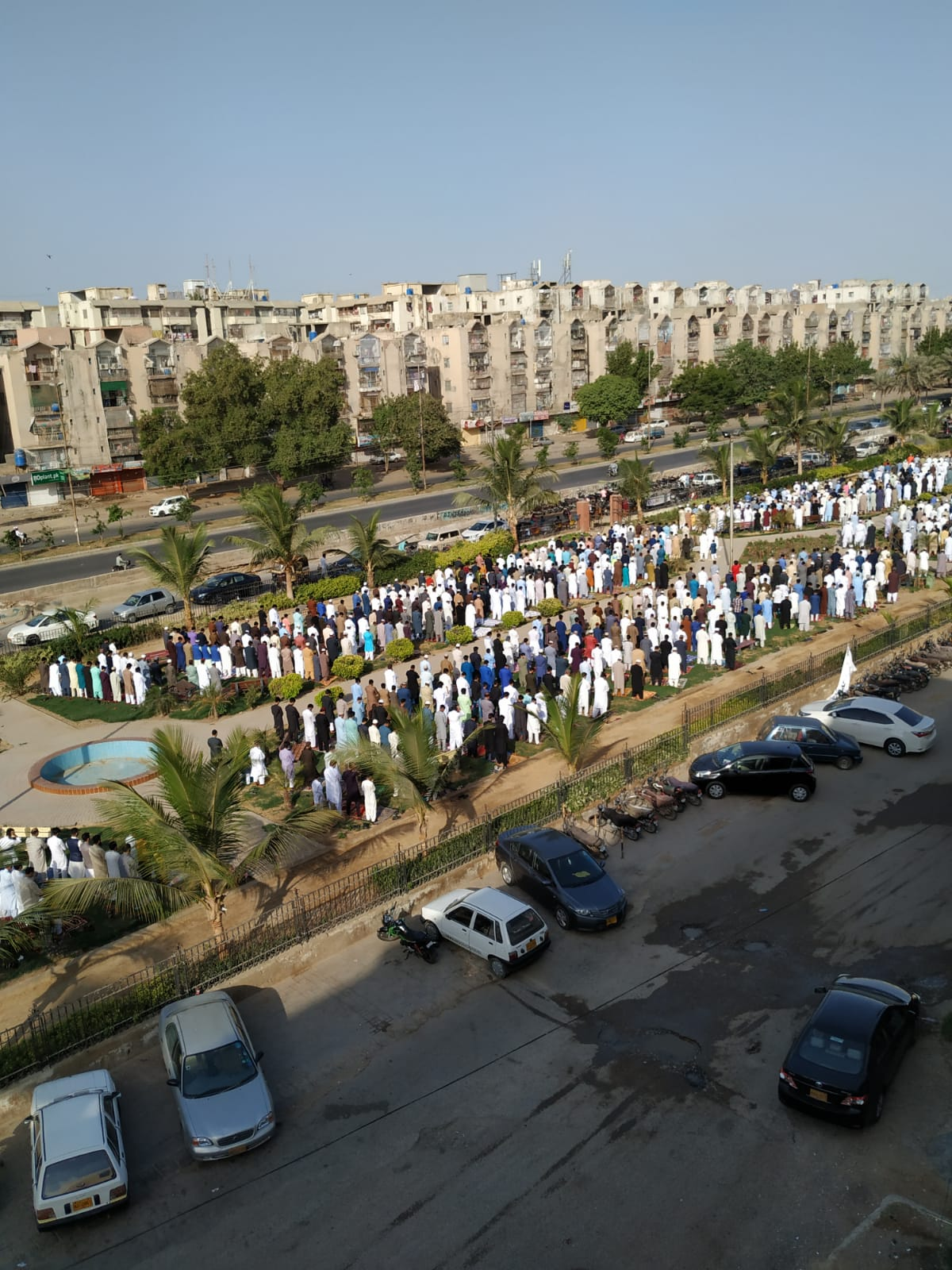
Eid Prayers at Gulistan-e-Jauhar Park

== Infrastructure ==
The neighborhood is characterized by a comprehensive network of roads, public transport, and utilities. Gulistan-e-Jauhar houses amany educational institutions, from public and private schools to colleges and universities, including the University of Karachi and Habib University.

Healthcare facilities in the neighborhood include private hospitals, clinics, providing residents with access to essential health services. Similar to other parts of Karachi, Gulistan-e-Johar is susceptible to flooding during the monsoon season due to heavy rainfall.

== Culture and recreation ==
The neighborhood features several parks and recreational areas, including the renowned Jauhar Park. The neighborhood's apartments blocks and flats often have their own shared amenities, further enriching the recreational options for residents.

== Transport ==
The neighborhood is centrally located and easily accessible. Gulistan-e-Jauhar is well-connected to the rest of Karachi through a network of major roads, bus routes (Gulistan Coach, G-19, G-27, G-11 and EV-3), rickshaws, chinchis and ride-hailing apps. The neighborhood is also close to the busiest airport in Pakistan, Jinnah International Airport. As of early 2023, major road construction were completed while in 2024, Fly over and underpass were constructed on Jauhar Chowrangi to ease the traffic jam.

== Administration ==
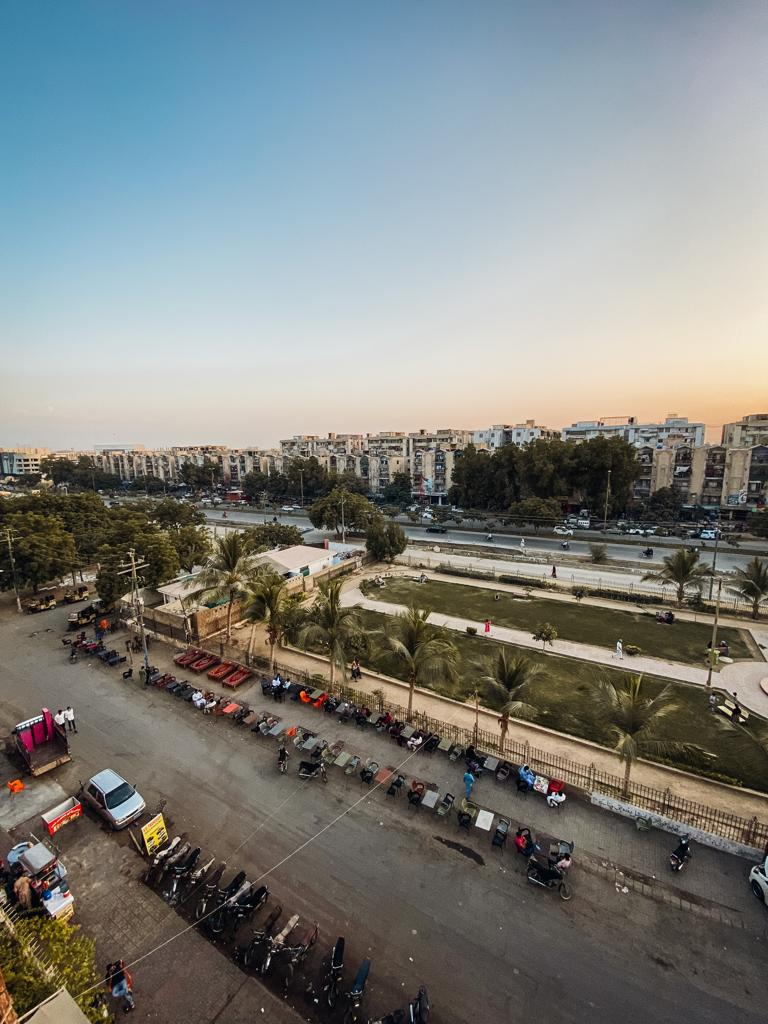

It was previously administered as part of the Gulshan Subdivision borough, which was disbanded in 2011. Some blocks of the neighborhood fall within Faisal Cantonment Board's administration.

== See also ==
- Gulshan-e-Iqbal
- Gulzar-e-Hijri
