= COVID-19 pandemic in Pakistan =

Outbreak of COVID-19 disease

- Disease: COVID-19
- Pathogen: SARS-CoV-2
- Location: Pakistan
- First outbreak: Wuhan, Hubei, China
- Index case: Karachi and Islamabad (cases reported on same day)
- Arrival date: 26 February 2020 (6 years, 8 months, 2 weeks and 4 days)
- Confirmed cases: 1,580,631
- Recovered: 1,245,155
- Deaths: 30,656
- Fatality rate: 1.94%
- Vaccinations: 165,567,890 (total vaccinated); 140,475,870 (fully vaccinated); 340,974,140 (doses administered)

Government website
- www.covid.gov.pk

The COVID-19 pandemic in Pakistan is part of the pandemic of coronavirus disease 2019 (COVID-19) caused by severe acute respiratory syndrome coronavirus 2 (SARS-CoV-2). The virus was confirmed to have reached Pakistan on 26 February 2020, when two cases were recorded (a student in Karachi who had just returned from Iran and another person in the Islamabad Capital Territory). On 18 March 2020, cases had been confirmed in all four provinces, the two autonomous territories, and Islamabad Capital Territory, and by 17 June, each district in Pakistan had recorded at least one confirmed case of COVID-19.

Despite being the world's 5th-most-populous country, Pakistan only has so far recorded the world's 29th-highest death toll (at approximately 23,087) and 29th-highest number of confirmed cases (at approximately 1,011,708). However, these figures do not include under-counting of COVID-19 infections in the country.

Pakistan so far has experienced three different waves of COVID-19. The nation's first wave, which began in late May 2020, peaked in mid-June when daily new confirmed case numbers and daily new death numbers reached high points – and ended in mid-July. The first wave was marked by a low death rate, and passed very suddenly as case and death rates began to drop very quickly after peaking. After the first wave, Pakistan's COVID-19 situation subsided ,dand aily new death numbers and testing positive rates in the country stabilized at low levels. Cases and deaths began rising again, though, in early November 2020, culminating in the country's second wave. This wave was low in its intensity, mainly affected the southern province of Sindh, and peaked in mid-December 2020. The country's third wave began in mid-March 2021, when testing positivity rates, and daily new confirmed cases and deaths began to skyrocket. The third wave mainly affected the provinces of Punjab and Khyber Pakhtunkhwa. This wave peaked in late April 2021, and since then, positivity rates, daily new case numbers, and daily new death numbers have been falling.

Pakistan's most populated province, Punjab, has so far seen the highest raw number of confirmed cases (334,000) and deaths (9,770). Sindh, the second-most populated province in the country, has seen the second-highest number of confirmed cases (308,000) and deaths (4,910), but was hit hardest by Pakistan's first two waves of the virus, and still has higher proportions of confirmed cases than all of Pakistan's other provinces. It also has the second-highest death rate, after Khyber Pakhtunkhwa, which is Pakistan's third-most-populated province. While Khyber Pakhtunkhwa has the third-highest number of confirmed cases of COVID-19 (129,000), it has faced an exceptionally high fatality rate of 3.03% which has caused it to have the highest death rate out of any province and the third-highest number of deaths (3,920). In the southwest of the country, the sparse and arid province of Balochistan has seen the lowest confirmed case count (24,500) and the lowest death count (270) of all of Pakistan's provinces and has also shown the lowest number of confirmed cases per capita, as well as the lowest number of deaths per capita. The fatality rate in Balochistan is especially low, currently standing at 1.10%. Islamabad Capital Territory, which is richer than any of Pakistan's provinces, has confirmed 80,300 cases and has seen 745 deaths so far, giving it a higher number of deaths per capita and a higher number of confirmed cases per capita than any Pakistani province, while also having the lowest fatality rate in the country.

The country was put under a nationwide lockdown from 1 April and extended twice until 9 May. Upon its end, the lockdown was eased in phases. After the first wave, the country has battled COVID-19 by using "smart lockdowns" and enforcing SOPs.

The distribution of COVID-19 in Pakistan is heavily concentrated in a few key areas. The city of Karachi (as of 7 May 2021) has recorded about 189,000 confirmed cases, making up about 22% of all cases of COVID-19 in Pakistan. Meanwhile, Lahore, the country's second-largest city, has recorded (as of 5 September 2020) 170,000 cases of COVID-19, making up about 19% of the country's cases. Islamabad Capital Territory and Peshawar District have recorded about 79,000 and 47,000 confirmed cases respectively as of the latest available data. Karachi, Lahore, Islamabad, and Peshawar account for about 485,000 cases, which make up over 55% of the country's total confirmed cases.

== Background ==
On 12 January 2020, the World Health Organization (WHO) confirmed that a novel coronavirus was the cause of a respiratory illness in a cluster of people in Wuhan, Hubei, China, which was reported to the WHO on 31 December 2019.

The case fatality ratio for COVID-19 has been much lower than SARS of 2003, but the transmission has been significantly greater, with a significant total death toll.

== Timeline ==
Cases

Deaths

=== February 2020 ===
On 26 February, Pakistan confirmed its first two cases of the coronavirus. Zafar Mirza, the Prime Minister's Special Assistant on Health, stated in a tweet: "I can confirm first two cases of coronavirus in Pakistan." The first patient was a student at the University of Karachi, Karachi in Sindh province, while the second patient was from the federal territory of the country. Both patients had recently returned from Iran.

Within a week of the first two cases, Pakistan confirmed three is more cases, including a case in Pakistan's capital, Islamabad and also in Rawalpindi, Punjab.

=== March 2020 ===
==== 1–10 March – Early spread ====
The fifth case was also reported, on 2 March, from the federal area of the country, of a 45-year-old woman from Gilgit-Baltistan, who had also travelled from Iran.

On 6 March, Murtaza Wahab announced that the first patient in Karachi had fully recovered and was later discharged from hospital after testing negative. On 8 March, Pakistan confirmed its seventh case of COVID-19, also in Karachi.

The next day, Pakistan reported nine new cases in Karachi, meaning that there was a total of 16 cases of COVID-19, with Sindh having the highest number of cases, 13 altogether. Five of the new patients had travelled to Syria and some others patients had returned from London. Three new cases were confirmed on 10 March, including one in Hyderabad and the first case in Quetta, Balochistan.

==== 11–19 March – Outbreak ====
On 11 March 76 suspected cases were reported in several districts of Punjab province, including Lahore, Gujranwala, Sargodha, Hafizabad and Lodhran. The Healthcare Department officials informed that ten patients were immediately cleared of the suspicion, while 55 patients were cleared after testing negative. A second case in Gilgit-Baltistan was confirmed the same day in Skardu leaving the tally at 20. A third case was confirmed in Gilgit-Baltistan in Shigar District on 12 March, who had a travel history of Iran and was reported to be under treatment at the Skardu hospital. The same day, Murtaza Wahab informed that the second patient of the virus had completely recovered. On 13 March, the Sindh Health Department identified a 52-year-old patient as positive, which marked the first case of local disease transmission as the patient had travelled from Islamabad. 24 of the 27 suspected cases in Khyber Pakhtunkwa were also cleared that day. 10% of International travelers were also infected but remained asymptomatic. At the end of the day, the total number of cases had risen to 28, with six new cases in Taftan and another in Sindh. By 14 March, the number of cases was 31 as two new patients were found positive in Karachi while one was reported in Islamabad.

Five more cases were announced in Karachi the next day on 15 March, including a second local transmission of the coronavirus in Sindh, while the other three had a travel history of Saudi Arabia and one had been to Balochistan. There was also a new case reported in Islamabad Capital Territory. Lahore Health Secretary, Mohammad Usman confirmed the first case of coronavirus in Punjab in the city of Lahore. The infected patient had returned from United Kingdom on 10 March and was shifted to Mayo Hospital in an isolation ward. The National Institute of Health reported 11 new cases in Sindh and 6 new in a mobile lab at the Taftan border area. and the first case in Punjab, increasing the tally to 53. On 16 March, a total of 134 new positives cases were registered, the majority of them, 116 in Sindh. Khyber Pakhtunkhwa also reported its first 15 cases while 3 were found in Balochistan. This marked the sharpest increase so far as not only were more than a 100 cases were reported in a province within a day but also the number across the country reached 187. The tally had shot up to 237 with 25 new cases in Punjab, 12 in Sindh and 4 in Islamabad on 17 March.

By 18 March, the first case of coronavirus was reported from Azad Kashmir. The provinces of Sindh and Gilgit-Baltistan saw an increase of cases by 36 and 10 respectively. New cases were also reported in other provinces. A patient from Hyderabad was also discharged after recovering in Sindh province, making the total number of recovered cases 5. A total of 302 positive cases were confirmed in Pakistan on 18 March. The first two deaths due to the virus in the country were also confirmed on the day. Both were reported from the province of Khyber Pakhtunkhwa, the first being a 50-year-old man who had recently from Saudi Arabia to Mardan District after performing Umrah in Mecca, while the second death was a 36-year-old from Hangu District. Both had been hospitalised in Peshawar.

The cases doubled by more than half from 33 to 80 in Punjab, and from 23 to 81 in Balochistan on 19 March. The rise in cases led the provincial government of Balochistan to declare a health emergency and impose a ban on public transport. The provincial government spokesperson Liaquat Shahwani stated that a relief package will be provided to the employees of transport companies. With a total of 159 new cases, the number confirmed cases jumped to 461.

==== 20–31 March – First deaths ====
On 20 March, the first death was reported in Sindh. The patient was a 77-year-old who had acquired the virus through local transmission. The patient was a cancer survivor and had other underlying medical problems such as hypertension and diabetes. While in other provinces, the increase in number of new cases was lower compared to the past few days at 34 and the tally stood at 495.

On 22 March, the third death in Khyber Pakhtunkhwa was announced. The first death in Gilgit-Baltistan and Balochistan were also announced on that day, meaning that the number of deaths increased to 6. The number of cases had also increased to 784 with 138 new cases. The fatality at DHQ Hospital in Gilgit was a doctor who contracted the virus after screening pilgrims returning from Iran. On 22 March, Gilgit-Baltistan went under lockdown for an indefinite period. 13 new pilgrims from Taftan via Dera Ghazi Khan were put in quarantine at Mirpur. Also on that day, Descon donated 10,000 hand sanitisers to hospitals in Punjab, whereas in Balochistan 26 drivers who transported the positive COVID-19 cases to hospitals were kept in quarantine.

On 23 March, many doctors across the nation complained about the lack of proper equipment for battling the virus. A spokesman for Doctors' Union in Khyber Pakhtunkhwa said, "We do not have personal protective equipment (PPE), or goggles, and even [face] masks we are buying from our own funds". Arrangements were made on the day by the Foreign Office to bring 72 Pakistanis stranded at the Doha International Airport in Doha, Qatar as it had decided to temporarily ban travellers from Pakistan and 14 other countries early in the month. The passengers were subject to strict screening upon arrival. Another flight was arranged to bring 150 citizens for the UAE stranded at Dubai and Abu Dhabi International Airport. The Sindh Education Minister Saeed Ghani tested positive for the virus and self-quarrantined for 14 days that day. He recovered from the virus on 30 March.

On 24 March, Sindh and Balochistan observed lockdown until 7 April, while Azad Kahmsir went under it until 13 April respectively. Punjab also imposed lockdown on 24 March, but only until 6 April. In Sindh, the local police detained 472 people in various districts of the province the same day in violation of the lockdown, with 222 of them in Karachi alone and a total of 72 FIRs were registered on 24 March. The cases pertained to hoarding and profiteering of safety masks and hand sanitisers, large gatherings, opening shops and restaurants, and travelling in passenger buses. The provincial government of Sindh allowed 640 pilgrims quarantined in Sukkur to return home after being tested negative for the virus. The Chief Minister issued directives for the relevant deputy commissioners to receive the pilgrims on their return and monitor their health conditions for the next 10 days.

On 25 March, several restrictions were imposed in the capital territory of Islamabad. These included closing of the outpatient departments of hospitals, complete bans on intra-city, inter-district and inter-province public transport as well as gatherings in public and private places. Three new recoveries were announced as well as the eighth death in the country. The number of positive cases in the nation crossed 1,000 as the tally increased to 1,057. On 26 March 140 new cases were tested positive across Pakistan. One new death was reported in Punjab, meaning that the death toll increased to 9. The total number of cases reached 1,197. Meanwhile, the number of recoveries increased by 2.

On 27 March, Pakistan reported a total of 211 new cases, the first time the number crossed 200. Punjab also overtook Sindh as the province with the highest number of cases at 490, while two deaths were also reported there. The National Institute of Health (NIH) distributed N95 masks across Sindh, while in Khyber Pakhtunkhwa, screening teams were deputed at all district entry and exit points for the screening of visitors of COVID-19 patients. In Gilgit-Baltistan, the local government decided that all travellers coming from the Taftan border would be tested for COVID-19. The total number of positive cases in the country reach 1408, while 3 patients were discharged, making the recovered cases a total of 26 and two deaths occurred, taking the total number of deaths to 11. The NIH initiated district level trainings of high-dependency unit, isolation and quarantine staff across Punjab.

On 28 March, the Foundation set up by the Chinese billionaire Jack Ma and the Alibaba Group sent a second aircraft carrying various medical supplies to Pakistan. The aircraft was received in Karachi with at least 50,000 testing kits, large number of face masks, ventilators, and personal protective equipment (PPE), which were combined around two tonnes of supplies worth Rs 67 million. The same day, Pakistan allowed Thai Airways to resume its flight operation for Islamabad to bring back 175 Pakistanis stranded in Bangkok, Thailand. Meanwhile, the Government of Punjab announced a Rs 10 billion relief package for financial support of 2.5 million families of daily-wage earners.

The country reported an additional 118 cases on 29 March, taking the total to 1,526. One death each was reported in the provinces of Sindh and Khyber Pakhtunkhwa, taking the total number of deceased to 13. Khyber Pakhtunkhwa developed and disseminated quarantine discontinuation guidelines. Also on the day, five Pakistani nationals visiting India on medical visas returned home via the Wagah border after being stranded in Noida and New Delhi due to the countrywide 21-day lockdown imposed by the Indian government. Two of them tested positive for the virus on 31 March. As the cases neared 500 in Sindh, the CM of the province said that the data showed 25% of cases were due to local transmission. He stated, "the local transmission ratio is worrisome and needs to be contained further."

On 30 March, Pakistan reported the highest number of new cases in a single day for March at 240. The total number reached 1,865 while total recoveries stood at 58 with 25 deaths. the Federal Minister for Science and Technology Chaudhry Fawad Hussain said that locally manufactured ventilators and testing kits would hit the market in the coming days. The coronavirus testing kits were developed by Pakistan's National Institute of Virology based in Karachi University and the National University of Science and Technology (NUST) have been handed to the Drug Regulatory Authority (DRAP) for final approval. While the Pakistan Engineering Council (PEC) developed ventilators, in collaboration with NED University of Engineering and Technology and Pakistan Engineering Board, which were handed over to DRAP later in the week. He also said that the capacity of Pakistan Council of Scientific and Industrial Research (PCSIR) for production of hand sanitizers was enhanced.

On 31 March 82 total recoveries were announced, as well as the 26th death in the country. 174 new cases were tested positive, meaning that the total number of positive cases had increased to 2,039.

=== April 2020 ===
On 1 April 252 new cases were confirmed, bringing the total number of cases to 2291, while the total number of recoveries in the country surpassed 100. A further 159 new cases were confirmed on 2 April, bringing the tally to 2450. Four deaths were reported, two from Sindh and one each from KP, and Gilgit increasing the total to 35. The total cases increased to 2708 after 258 new cases were confirmed on 3 April, making Punjab the first province to cross 1,000 confirmed cases. Five deaths were reported.

The number of confirmed cases crossed 3,000 around the nation on 5 April. The country recorded nearly a 1000 cases over the next two days and the tally reached a total of 4,005 on 7 April with 54 deaths and 429 recoveries. Sindh became the second province to cross 1,000 confirmed cases after Punjab on 8 April. On 11 April, the total cases surged over 5,000 leaving over 80 dead so far. The total number of recoveries in Pakistan reached above 1,000 on 12 April.

The federal government decided on 14 April to extend the ongoing lockdown for two more weeks until 30 April. On 15 April, the national death tally surpassed 100 and the number of cases crossed 6000. On 16 April, it was reported that 58% of the cases had been locally transmitted in Pakistan.

Khyber Pakhtunkhwa crossed the mark of 1,000 confirmed cases on 18 April. A report released on 21 April stated that over 2,000; 27% of the total positive cases in the country were linked to the religious congregation of the Tablighi Jamaat. Pakistan crossed a critical mark of the outbreak in the country as the total number of cases surged above 10,000 on 22 April. On 24 April, the federal government once again extended the lockdown in the country, this time until 9 May.

In late April, a group of senior doctors in Pakistan, and abroad, wrote to religious leaders and to the prime minister "pleading" not to open mosques during ramadan, particularly as 80% of the people attending would be mostly in their 60s and 70s. This could result in an "explosion of Covid-19". The governor of Sindh, Imran Ismail revealed on 27 April that he had tested positive for COVID-19 via Twitter.

=== May 2020 ===
By 7 May, COVID-19 had infected more than 500 Pakistani healthcare workers. On 9 May, the lockdown ended in Pakistan. On 18 May 16 new fatalities were recorded in Khyber Pakhtunkhwa, bringing the death toll to 334 in the province. The next day, a further 11 fatalities were reported in the province, bringing the death toll to 345. On 19 May, it was reported that a 64-year-old patient in Hyderabad, Sindh, recovered after undergoing plasma therapy. On 21 May, the number of positive cases passed 48,000, after 2,193 new cases were announced. 32 new fatalities were recorded. The death toll reached 1,017, as the number of recoveries reached 14,155. Planning Minister Asad Umar said that Pakistan could test 25,000 people a day.

On 22 May, Pakistan International Airlines Flight 8303 crashed on approach to Jinnah International Airport, killing 97 of the 99 people on board. The crash further stretched health resources, and led to a three-day long decline in testing.

On 29 May, it was announced that 900 children under the age of 10 had tested positive in Sindh. Most cases were asymptomatic.

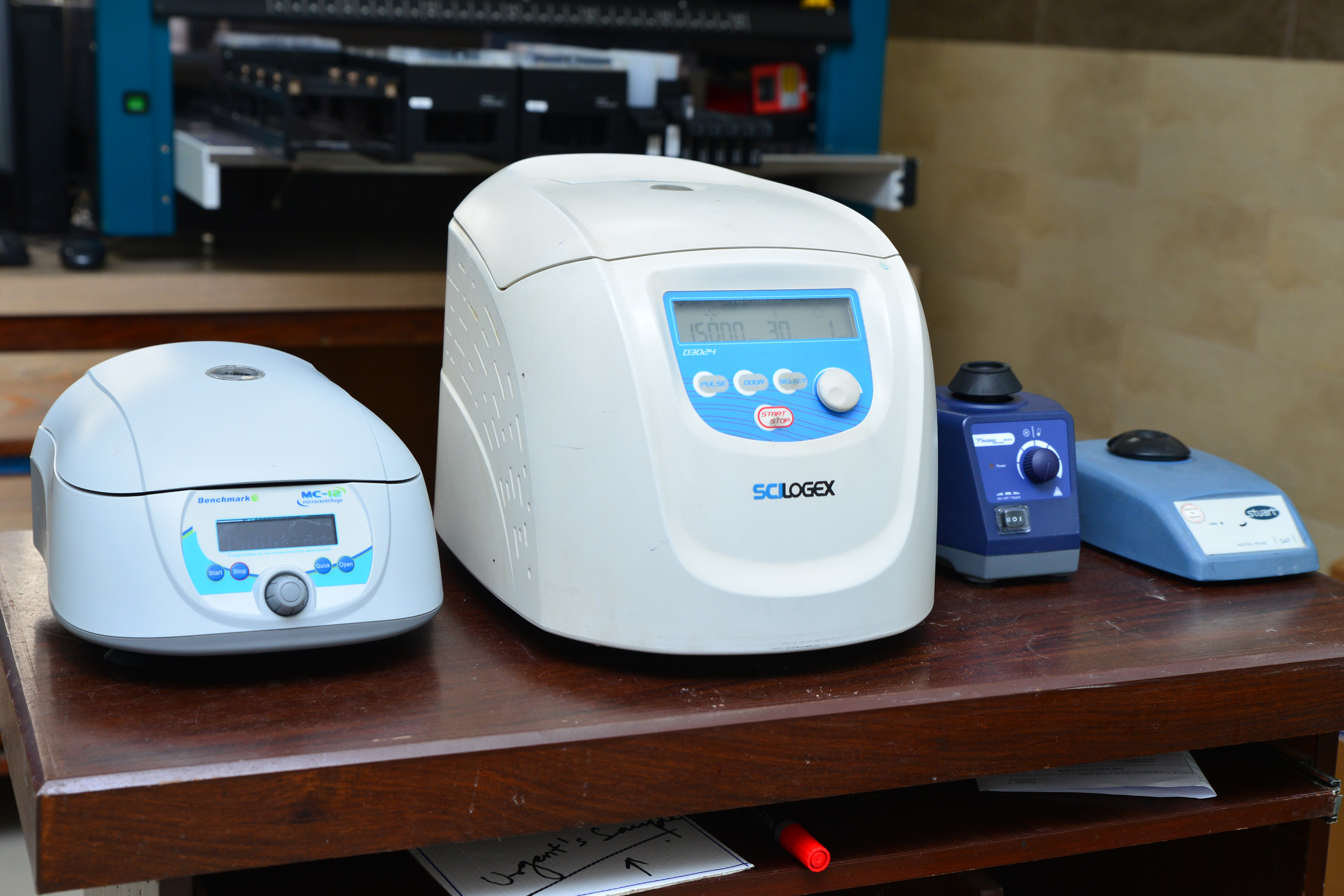
COVID-19 Equipment

=== June 2020 ===
In early June, after testing began to pick up once again, case numbers began rising far faster, after levels of new cases in 24 hours breaking 3,000 on 31 May 3 June was the first day in which more than 4,000 people tested positive for COVID-19. The ratio of positive cases to tests also increased, hovering around 20 – 25% in the first few days of June.

On 1 June 2020, it was reported that Punjab's chief minister, Usman Buzdar, had been told in a summary that there were an estimated 670,000 cases of COVID-19, most of them asymptomatic, in Lahore and that COVID-19 had reached every single area of Lahore.

On 13 June 2020, veteran Pakistani cricketer and former captain of Pakistan national cricket team Shahid Afridi confirmed that he has been tested positive for COVID-19 through his official Twitter account after experiencing severe body pain since 11 June 2020. He was actively involved in social service helping people across Balochistan in the remote areas during the lockdown imposed in the country prior to contracting with the coronavirus.

On 17 June 2020, Shaheed Sikandarabad District, Sherani District, and Barkhan District, all in Balochistan, all recorded their first case of COVID-19. This meant that every single district in the four provinces of Pakistan had at least one confirmed case of COVID-19.

=== December 2020 ===
On 31 December 2020, Minister for Science and Technology Fawad Chaudhry said that Pakistan will purchase 1.2 million doses of coronavirus vaccine from Sinopharm.

=== January 2021 ===
On 7 January 2021, Parliamentary Secretary for Ministry of National Health Services Dr Nausheen Hamid said that Pakistan is expected to get the first COVID-19 vaccine shipment by the end of the month. On 9 January 2021, Islamabad got its first coronavirus vaccination centre after the government established the facility in Tarlai area of the federal capital. On 10 January 2021, the government's National Command and Operation Center (NCOC) opened registrations for frontline healthcare workers, who will receive the first doses of the COVID-19 vaccine. Staff in both public and private health facilities will be vaccinated, NCOC announced on its website.

On 16 January 2021, AstraZeneca's COVID-19 vaccine was approved for emergency use in Pakistan as the Chinese vaccine was awaiting approval from the Drug Regulatory Authority of Pakistan (DRAP). Faisal Sultan added that Pakistan had adequate cold chain facilities for most kinds of vaccines. On 18 January 2021, The Drug Regulatory Authority of Pakistan (DRAP) approved the Sinopharm BIBP vaccine for emergency use. On 21 January 2021, Pakistan's Foreign Minister Shah Mehmood Qureshi said that China agreed to provide half a million doses of the Chinese Sinopharm vaccine free of cost to Pakistan by 31 January. On 31 January 2021, it was announced that 17 million doses of the AstraZeneca vaccine would be provided to Pakistan by COVAX.

=== February 2021 ===
On 1 February 2021, Pakistan received the first vaccine doses from China. On 12 February 2021, Pakistan approved the emergency use of the Convidecia vaccine developed by CanSino Biologics.

On 24 February 2021, Pakistan announced all coronavirus restrictions would be lifted from 15 March.

=== March 2021 ===
By 5 March 2021, 197,000 vaccine doses had been administered in Pakistan. On 6 March, Nadhim Zahawi announced that Pakistan will get 17 million COVID-19 vaccine doses from the United Kingdom.

On 16 March, Pakistan received 500,000 doses of the Sinopharm vaccine as a donation from China.

=== May 2021 ===
On 28 May, Pakistan received 106,000 doses of Pfizer–BioNTech COVID-19 vaccine through the COVAX initiative. Pfizer officials confirmed that 1 million more doses could be delivered to Islamabad in July or August, subject to the bilateral agreement being negotiated at the time.

=== June 2021 ===
On 28 June, the U.S. confirmed it would be sending 2.5 million doses of the Moderna COVID-19 vaccine to Pakistan, and that they were expected to arrive in 1 week.

=== April 2022 ===
ON, APRIL 1, 2022, Minister for Planning, Development and Special Initiatives Asad Umar announced CLOSURE of the National Command and Operation Center (NCOC) operations, partly because of all-time low COVID-19 indicators and partly because of high level of vaccination.

== Raiwind Hotspot ==
Raiwind in the city of Lahore acts as the headquarters of the Tablighi Jamaat in Pakistan, an evangelical organisation that promotes proselytism by all its members. On 10 March, a congregation of the organisation took place in Raiwind Markaz and resulted as a coronavirus super-spreader event with more than 539 confirmed cases linked to it reported across the country so far.

According to a report by the Punjab Special Branch approximately 70,000 to 80,000 members may have attended the congregation, with the majority being from various parts of Pakistan and 3,000 attendees from 40 foreign countries. The Jamaat's management claimed 250,000 attendees. The event carried on despite the strong opposition and warnings by the Government of Punjab. But according to the police, it was cut short from six days to three days. A cluster spread became apparent in the following days as cases traced back to the event were reported across the country. By 31 March 143 infections and three deaths were reported.

On 2 April, Pakistani authorities placed the entire city of Raiwind under quarantine, and shut down all general and medical stores after 40 Tablighi Jamaat participants tested positive for coronavirus. As of 8 April 539 infections were reported, of which 404 were in the Raiwind Markaz and 31 in Hafizabad.

In Punjab, 10,263 attendees of the Tablighi Jamaat event were quarantined in 36 districts of the province. Efforts are under way to trace thousands of other participants. The government of Sindh also announced a quarantine of all the attendees of the event. Bara Kahu in Islamabad has been quarantined as some returning attendees there tested positive for the coronavirus. Approximately 50 participants of the Tablighi Jamaat, including five Nigerian women, were admitted to a quarantine centre in Kasur while some 38 participants have also tested positive in Hyderabad.

A report in late April revealed that the event had caused over 2,000; 27% of the country's total positive cases.

== Other cases ==
On 29 January, four Pakistani students studying in China tested positive for COVID-19. Two more were later confirmed making the total number 6. Four of the students had recovered on 12 February while the other two recovered on 14 February after being hospitalised in Guangzhou.

On 11 March, the Pakistani consulate in Milan announced the first death of a Pakistani from COVID-19 in Brescia, Italy.

A Pakistani national tested positive at the Torkham border between Pakistan and Afghanistan on 12 March. It was reported that the patient was an employee of Pakistani embassy in Afghanistan.

On 20 March, the Palestinian Health Ministry announced a new case in Salfit Governorate, Palestine, which originated from Pakistan. On 21 March, Palestinian sources confirmed the first two cases in Gaza City, Gaza; the two Palestinians had travelled from Pakistan and entered Gaza through Egypt. Once they had tested positive for the virus they were placed in quarantine in Rafah since their arrival on 19 March. On 22 March, a patient in Zambia had travelled to Pakistan and had contracted COVID-19.

On 28 March, Pakistani squash player Azam Khan died of COVID-19 in London, England, at the age of 95.

== Prevention measures and response ==
=== Federal government ===
==== March 2020 ====
The national carrier, PIA decided to suspend the flight operation between Pakistan and China till 30 January due to the outbreak. After confirmed reports of hundreds of cases in neighbouring China, the Pakistan Civil Aviation Authority (CAA) introduced screening measures at four major airports: Islamabad, Karachi, Lahore and Peshawar for every passenger arriving from China. Screening was also started for domestic travellers at Karachi's airport on 21 March.

On 13 March, President Dr. Arif Alvi in a special tweet, advised the public to avoid participation in mass gatherings, handshaking or hugging in addition to taking other precautionary measures if they observe symptoms of flu or coronavirus infection. Pakistan also stopped all international flights, except those at Islamabad, Karachi and Lahore airports on the day.

It was also decided on 13 March at the National Security Council meeting with Prime Minister Imran Khan that all schools and universities would be closed until 5 April. However, the faculty and staff will go to work as usual. The lectures and classes will be held online in some institutions i.e., Riphah International University, FAST NUCES University, Institute of Space Technology. The Pakistan Day Parade, scheduled to be held on 23 March was also cancelled along with all public events and proceedings of the Senate were postponed for two weeks on the day.

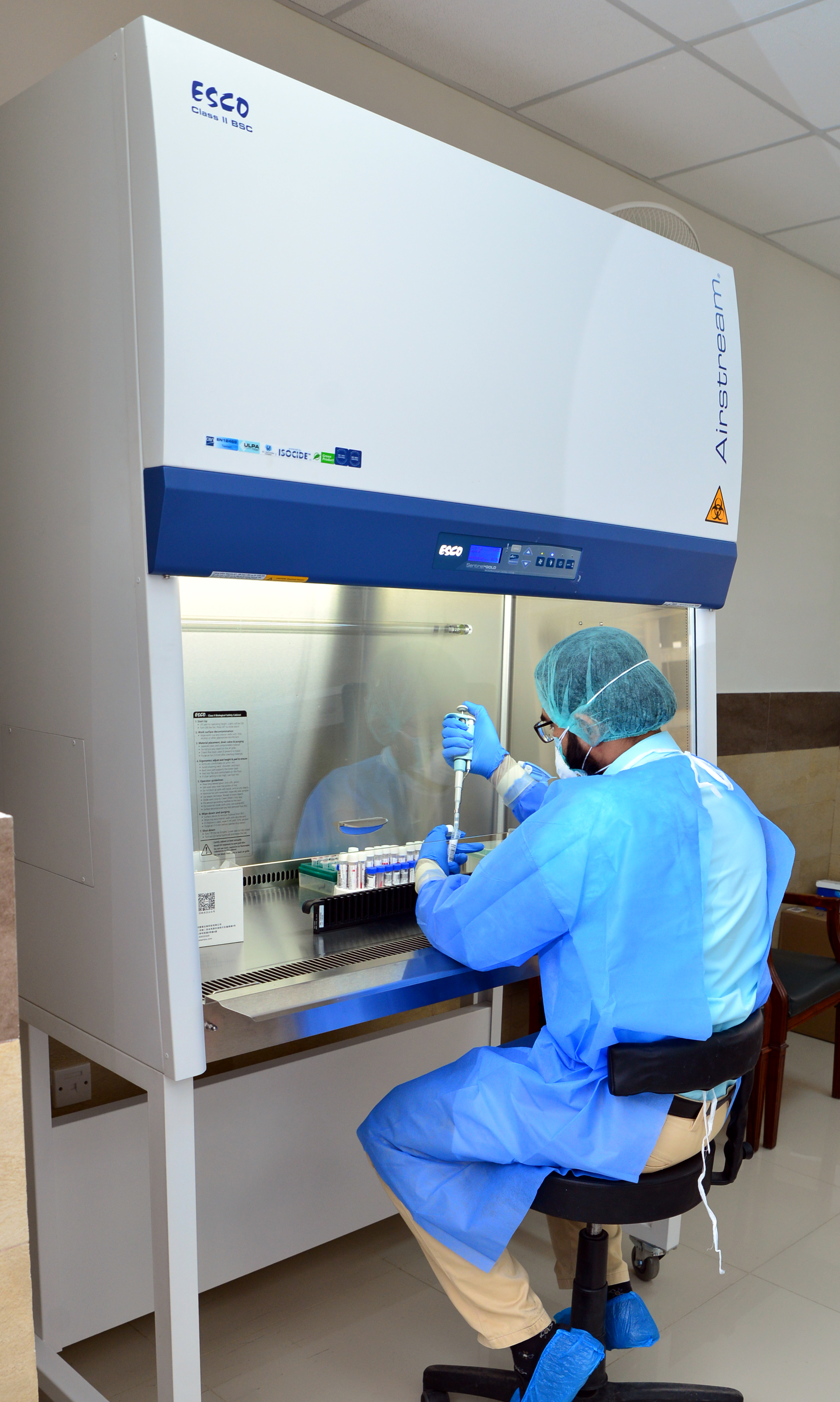
COVID-19 Equipment in Pakistan

Pakistan closed its borders to travellers from Afghanistan at the Chaman border from 2 until 21 March. The border was only partially reopened later after 21 March for transportation of food items while pedestrian movement remained suspended. The Durand Line border was sealed from 16 March for at least two weeks. The same time period also applied to the land border with Iran after reopening it on 7 March from a previous closure. All land borders, including the China-Pakistan border with China were shut from 16 March.

Lieutenant General Muhammad Afzal, the NDMA chairman, announced that the government was working on securing more PPEs and other resources for healthcare workers on 20 March.

On 21 March, all international flights were suspended for two weeks. The Civil Aviation Authority stated, "[The] government of Pakistan has decided to suspend operation of all international passenger, chartered and private flights to Pakistan, effective from March 21 till April 4". This led to many citizens being stranded in the Middle East, Thailand and Malaysia. The Railways Minister Sheikh Rasheed Ahmed declared the suspension of 42 trains.

The health ministry announced that 14 metric tonnes of PPE, "including face masks, thermometers, gloves [and] gowns", had been dispatched to Pakistan on 22 March. The federal government offered financial assistance to Sindh by allotting the province $10 million from the non-development funds of the World Bank the same day. Imran Ismail, the Governor of Sindh stated that the federal government was taking "vigorous measures" to control the outbreak and that rations will be provided to the families of patients.

On 23 March, the nation celebrated Pakistan Day without any public gatherings or a military parade. Prime Minister Imran Khan and President Dr. Arif Alvi urged the nation to demonstrate unity, discipline and passion in fighting the coronavirus pandemic. The PM also stated that a complete lockdown of the country was not feasible as 25% of the population lives below the poverty line and would make their lives miserable. The government has over 35 hospitals across the country set up to deal with the outbreak, equipped with more than 118,000 beds as of the day.

The National Assembly speaker Asad Qaiser summoned a meeting of the parliamentary leaders of the Senate and the Lower house to review and discuss the role of the Parliament in containing the spread of the pandemic across the country for 25 March on the day.

On 24 March, the Chief of the Army Staff General Qamar Javed Bajwa ordered the deployment of troops nationwide and military's medical resources to fight the ongoing outbreak alongside the national health infrastructure after the Ministry of Interior approved the action on the previous day. The Ministry had received requests in this regard from the provincial governments over the past two days amid surging number of patients.

The State Bank of Pakistan issued a statement the same day declaring that it would be providing disinfected cash to all banks for circulation while ensuring to "clean, disinfect, seal and quarantine all cash being collected from hospitals and clinics and to block circulation of such cash in the market." It was further assured that banks could re-issue cash which remained in quarantine for 15 days and all ATMs as well as call centres and helplines would be running 24/7. Banks could close branches only if a staff member tested positive for the virus or "where requisite human resources [were] not available" to avoid congestion as it would be counterproductive to social distancing. The federal capital territory of Islamabad was placed under virtual lockdown starting on 24 March.

On 26 March, Pakistan decided to seek $3.7 billion additional financing from three multilateral creditors including another loan of $1.4 billion from the International Monetary Fund to cope with the challenges being posed by the novel coronavirus outbreak. Adviser to the PM on Finance Dr Abdul Hafeez Shaikh announced at a news conference that the World Bank and the Asian Development Bank would also extend loans of $1 billion and $1.25 billion respectively to the country.

The PM announced the formation of a youth force labelled 'Corona Relief Tigers' to help the government in the fight against the spread of coronavirus nationwide on 27 March. The force was distributed across the country and would be used to supply food items to people in their houses in case COVID-19 cases sharply rose in a locality. The recruitment began on 31 March.

Due to various lockdowns imposed by the regional governments, the goods transport system came to a halt in later March. Thus, the federal government decided on 29 March that highways and roads across the country would remain open to ensure the transportation of goods and also increased the number of freight trains to avert a shortage of food and other essential supplies. Chairing a meeting, the Prime Minister asked the provincial governments to take strict action against hoarders and profiteers who were trying to exploit the ongoing crisis. By late March, many regions in Pakistan had considered releasing under-trial prisoners to curb the outbreak in jails. However, on 30 March, the Supreme Court prohibited high courts and federal and provincial governments from passing any order regarding the release of under-trial prisoners.

Also on 30 March, the State Minister for Health, Dr Zafar Mirza announced that the Higher Education Commission (HEC) was inviting proposals from researchers, scientists, technicians, manufacturers and other experts that could assist the government in its fight against COVID-19, adding that the commission would provide generous funding to prospective researchers if their ideas are accepted. Meanwhile, the Lt. Gen. Afzal said that Sindh had been provided 20,000 testing kits, Punjab 5,000, Balochistan 4,800 and that up to 37,000 kits had been put into reserve. The Federal Minister for Inter Provincial Coordination Dr. Fehmida Mirza announced to create a fund to cover all medical expenses of sports persons infected with COVID-19 on that day.

==== April 2020 ====
On 1 April, Special Assistant on Information and Broadcasting Dr. Firdous Ashiq Awan said that protective kits would be provided to the journalists covering vulnerable areas including quarantine centers. She also announced the launching of an app called COVID-19 Care for Media to help the journalists affected by the virus. Furthermore, newspapers hawkers would also be registered in Ehsaas Emergency Cash program; part of the economic relief package announced by the federal government, as their sales had also been affected due to the outbreak.

On 2 April, the Federal Minister for Planning and Development Asad Umar announced that the country was extending the ongoing lockdown for another two weeks until 14 April to curb the spread of the pandemic in the country. On 14 April, the Prime Minister announced that the ongoing lockdown would be extended for two more weeks until 30 April. On 24 April, the federal government once again extended the lockdown in the country until 9 May.

Some clerics took conservative position that mosques should remain open and operational during the holy month of Ramadan since congregational prayers are believed to be obligatory for Muslim men. The Minister of Science and Technology, Chaudhry Fawad Hussain expressed his disappointment over conservative stance, while the Pakistan Medical Association (PMA) along with the Pakistan Bar Association (PBA) demanded a complete lockdown in the country. The federal government upon the warning of PMA and senior doctors that relaxing the lockdown could cause a spike in the cases, decided to extend the lockdown until the middle of Ramadan. However, permission was granted under the leadership of the President, Arif Alvi in consultation with the ulama and state representatives for Mosque congregations.

==== Economic Relief Package ====
On 24 March, the Prime Minister approved a Rs 1.2 trillion economic relief package. Of this, a total of Rs 150 billion was allotted for low-income groups, particularly labourers while 280 billion rupees ($1.76 billion) was assigned for wheat procurement. Loan interest payments for exporters were deferred temporarily, while a package of 100 billion rupees ($63 million) was provided to support small industries and the agriculture sector. There was also a significant deduction in petroleum prices and the public couple pay electricity and gas bills below a certain amount in instalments. Under the package the monthly stipend of the Benazir Income Support Programme (BISP) was increased from Rs 2,000 to Rs 3,000. It was decided that the funds of the government's Ehsaas programme would be distributed among the poor according to the available data of the BISP and through the under progress National Socio-Economic Registry (NSER) of the BISP. The total number of BISP beneficiaries was 5.2 million but the number was increased under the package. The relief package also included a special package for healthcare professionals. According to which, if a doctor or a paramedic died while treating coronavirus patients, they would be considered martyrs and their families would receive the package that is given to martyrs.

The federal cabinet reviewed and approved the economic relief package on 31 March. The Economic Coordination Committee (ECC) finalised the package, including a Rs 100-billion supplementary grant for an Emergency Relief Fund to combat the pandemic. It also approved a special package for relief to 12 million poor families through cash assistance under the Ehsaas Programme, where cash grants would be provided under the Kafalat Programme and emergency cash assistance to the poor on the recommendation of the district administration. The financial assistance was provided for four months as a one-time dispensation. The cash would be provided either in one Rs 12,000 instalment through Kafalat partner banks, Bank Alfalah and Habib Bank Limited after biometric verification or in two instalments of Rs 6,000 each. Since its launch, a total of Rs 22.466 billion has been disbursed among 1.77 million individuals as of mid April.

=== Regional governments ===
2020 lockdows by regions ^{A}
Province or Territory	Start Date	End Date
Punjab	24 March	9 May
Sindh (22nd march)	24 March	9 May
Azad Kashmir	24 March	9 May
Balochistan	24 March	9 May
Islamabad	24 March	9 May
Khyber Pakhtunkhwa	23 March	9 May
Gilgit-Baltistan	22 March	9 May

==== Punjab ====
The Government of Punjab declared a health emergency on 12 March in a cabinet meeting. A quarantine facility was established in the Dera Ghazi Khan district for the pilgrims returning from Iran.

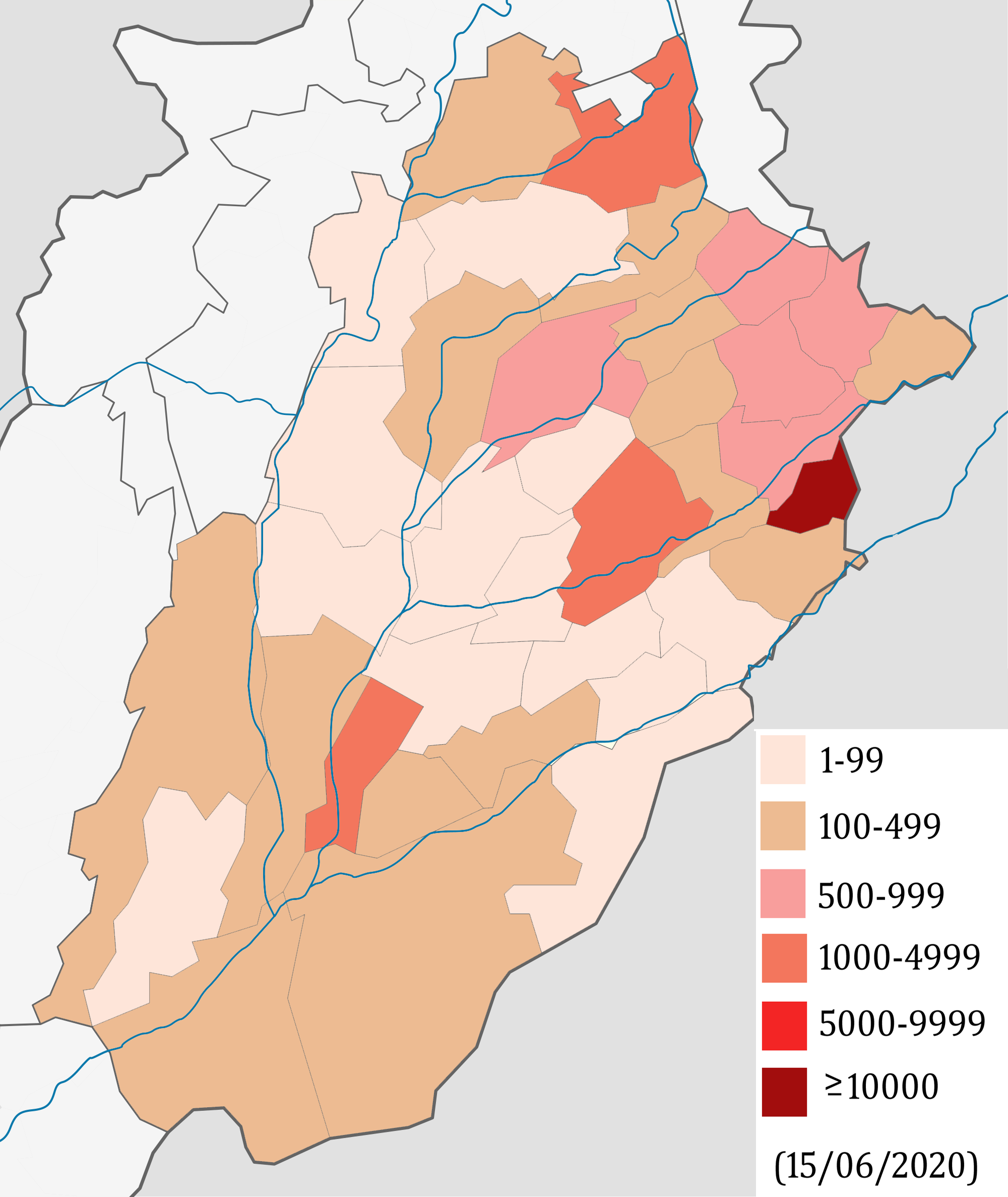
Map of districts with confirmed cases in Punjab, Pakistan

On 22 March, the government decided to close down shopping malls, markets, parks and public gathering places for two days until 24 March. Punjab Chief Minister, Sardar Usman Buzdar urged people to stay at home, practice social distancing and avoid unnecessary travel. Despite this, local media reported that many residents in Lahore had failed to practice the measures and downright defied it by opening up businesses and gathering in large numbers on various public grounds. This led to the local police and city administration to forcibly vacate them.

On 23 March, The Chief Minister announced a 14 days lockdown from 24 March until 6 April. All markets, shopping malls and public places were closed and pillion riding was banned. He also stated that a 1,000-bed hospital would be set up in Lahore while five other hospitals were designated for coronavirus patients across the province the next day on 23 March while the local government and rescue services started disinfecting towns and cities. Public bus services were also temporarily suspended to disinfect all buses and stations. The Secretary Home Department of Punjab wrote a letter one day to the Ministry of Interior seeking the assistance of the military under Article 245. The Punjab University manufactured coronavirus protection kits along with large amounts of hand sanitisers, disinfectants and antiseptic wet-tissues for the public. The sanitisers are for national usage. An online initiative was started for online purchases for home deliveries. Also on the day, more than 150 pilgrims arrived in Faisalabad from Iran via the Taftan border to be quarantined at a centre. More arrangements were made to quarantine another 450 pilgrims returning at a centre established in the campus of the Agricultural University. The government established the largest quarantine centre in the nation in Multan at Multan Industrial Estate to isolate the returning pilgrims with 3000 rooms. It had 1,247 pilgrims in quarantine as of the day. A companion 50-bed hospital was also set up to aid the centre.

The provincial government decided to close down the regional motorways except for private vehicles with up to two passengers as a preventive measure on 26 March. The NIH initiated district level training of high-dependency unit, isolation and quarantine staff across the province on 27 March.

The Chief Minister of the province announced a Rs 10 billion relief package for financial support of 2.5 million families of daily-wage earners on 28 March. Each family was entitled to Rs 4,000 financial assistance excluding the beneficiaries of the Benazir Income Support Programme (BISP). The government also decided to remove provincial taxes to the tune of Rs 18bn. The CM said that the Punjab government had decided to grant a 90-day imprisonment rebate to prisoners in jails across the province which would benefit some 3,100 prisoners. Furthermore, the Punjab Infectious Diseases Prevention and Control Ordinance, 2020, was implemented to allow the civil administration and health department to implement government measures with complete ease and under the cover of law. It was also declared that the government would provide a month's additional salary to all healthcare workers across Punjab. The Punjab Minister for Finance Hashim Jawan Bakht said that the economic package would also help the health sector and the Provincial Disaster Management Authority (PDMA) cope with the crisis with an immediate funding of Rs 11.5 billion. To aid the medical professionals, a textile owner from Lahore offered to manufacture PPE voluntarily and free of cost. Also in the meeting, the CM stated that laboratories around the province would test 3,200 people every day for coronavirus and 10,000 doctors and paramedics were being recruited to fight the pandemic.

The Chief Minister Insaf Imdaad Programme (CMIIP) was launched on 1 April to help the daily wagers and the poor communities of the province affected by the pandemic. Furthermore, Zakat funds worth Rs 870 million were also released to help around 170,000 families. A 1,000-bed field hospital was completed at the Lahore Expo Centre and the Punjab government also announced on the day that it had released Rs 620 million for the establishment of eight new diagnostic labs at the divisional level to speed up the testing process for COVID-19. Starting from 2 April, the lockdown in the province was extended until 14 April as per directions by the federal government. On 14 April, the lockdown period was further extended for two weeks, until 30 April by the federal government. The same day, Lahore police reported that a total of 13,498 cases had been registered against lockdown violators since 16 March.

By early April, the province suspended regular prayer services in places of worship to stop the spread of COVID-19. Punjab Chief Secretary, Azam Suleman Khan relayed to media on 6 April that field hospitals for coronavirus patients were being established across the province and two of these would be functional in Rawalpindi and Jhelum in the next three days.

On 8 April, the Lahore District Jail Superintendent urged authorities to not send any new inmates to the prison after 49 positive cases emerged there in addition to over 150 suspects. On 10 April, the Punjab Minister for Law, Parliamentary Affairs and Social Welfare Muhammad Basharat Raja stated that a transfer plan had been made to shift 3,500 prisoners from overcrowded jails to others to curb the spread of coronavirus in prisons of the province. Also on the day, the provincial Information Minister, Fayyazul Hassan Chohan declared a relief package for media workers and personnel. Under the package, the government would pay Rs 1 million to any journalist who died due to COVID-19 while his widow would get Rs 10,000 as monthly pension for life. Rs 100,000 would also be provided to any media worker diagnosed with the coronavirus.

At least 1,700 pilgrims returning from Iran were quarantined at a centre in Multan on 16 April.

==== Sindh ====
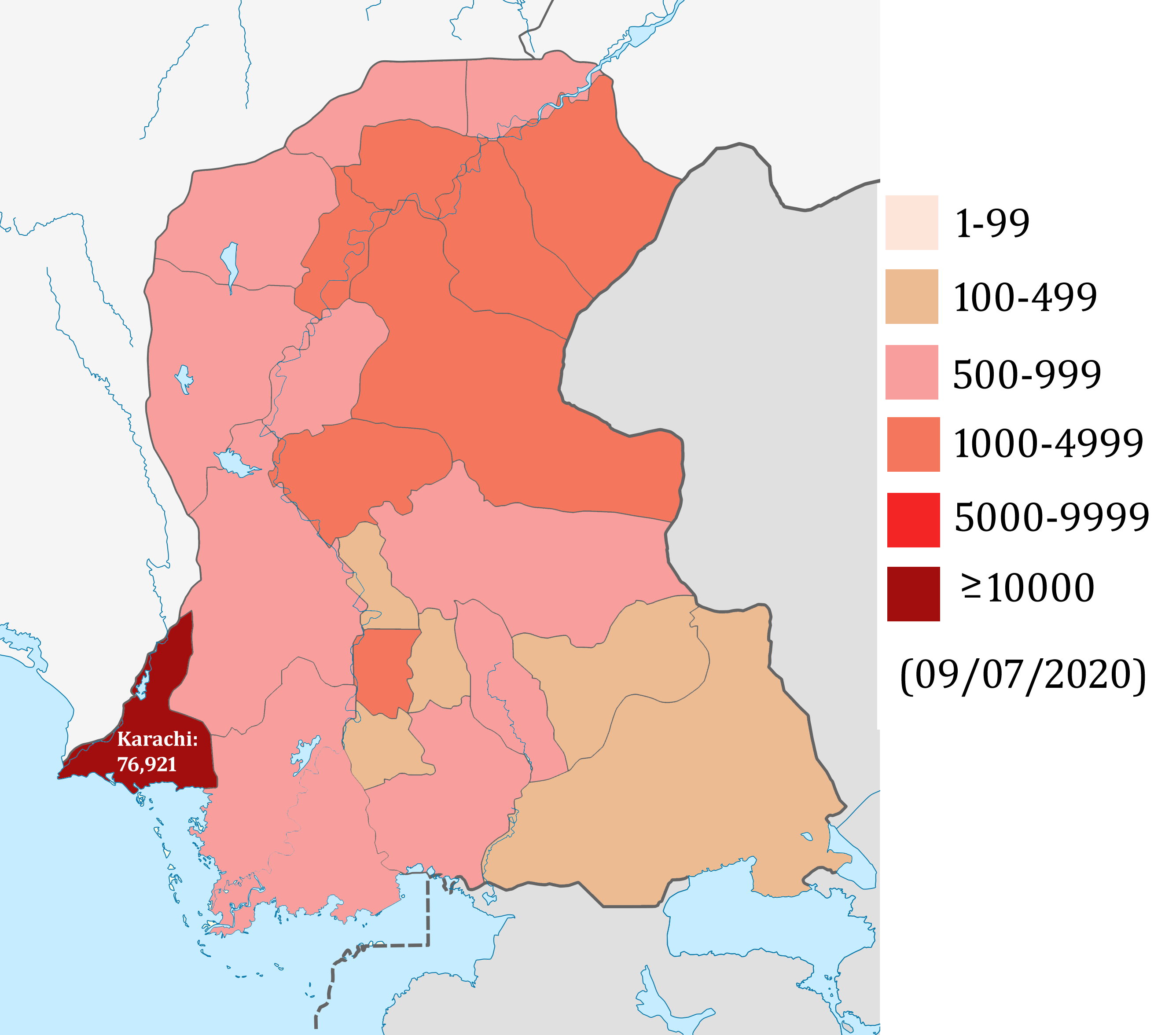
Map of districts with confirmed cases in Sindh

"Flatten the curve" campaign in Sindhi on social distancing .

On 1 March, Chief Minister of Sindh, Syed Murad Ali Shah, announced the closure of all educational institutes in Sindh until 13 March, which was later extended until 30 May. On 12 March, the Government of Sindh also announced that the remaining PSL matches at National Stadium, Karachi would be held behind closed doors. The Sindh government announced on 13 March that all educational institutions will remain closed until 30 May imposed a temporary ban on marriage halls, shrines and festivals in the province on 14 March.

On 20 March, the Pakistan Army helped set up a 10,000-bed field hospital at Karachi's Expo Centre to isolate and treat confirmed patients. ALl expenses for its establishment were born by the provincial government. On 21 March, the Government of Sindh announced a lockdown in the province for 14 days from morning of 24 March, ordering all public transport, markets, offices, shopping malls, restaurants, and public areas to be shut down. The Sindh government announced paid leave for all workers during the lockdown, and said no would be laid off during the period under Section 3 of the Sindh Epidemic Diseases Act (2014) and other relevant labour laws. The province banned intra-city transport to minimise the outbreak and multiple violators were issued fines, impounded and cancelled. The national army was called to enforce the lockdown. On 23 March, an isolation and quarantine centre was completed at the Jinnah Postgraduate Medical College in Karachi which also provided free tests of suspected cases with results in 8 hours of sample submission.

The Pakistan Cricket Board, on request from the Sindh Government, agreed to convert its Hanif Mohammad High Performance Centre into a temporary living area for paramedic staff working at the makeshift hospital at Expo Centre, Karachi on 24 March. The local police detained 472 people in various districts of the province on the day, with 222 of them in Karachi alone and a total of FIRs were registered. The cases pertained to hoarding and profiteering of safety masks and hand sanitisers, large gatherings, opening shops and restaurants and travelling in passenger buses. Multiple violations of the lockdown were observed in several places across the province such as gatherings on the beach, residents being out and major markets, shopping centres, bazaars and restaurants remained open. As a result, a taskforce meeting led by the Chief Minister was held on the next day on 25 March to take more stringent measures to ensure that all residents abided by the government orders of. It was resolved that all grocery stores and shops apart from pharmacies and medical stores to remain closed between 8 pm and 8 am. The Sindh Inspector General of Police, Javed Ahmed Mahar was directed to make measures taken in connection with the lockdown and make certain that people were not allowed to roam freely in the city unnecessarily. Additionally, the Chief Secretary and Karachi Commissioner were ordered to ensure that big factories remained closed during the lockdown and direct banks to keep only important branches operational.

On 25 March, the provincial health department officials began coronavirus case mapping as per directives by the Chief Minister. He further tasked them with sharing the data with deputy commissioners so necessary measures could be taken to contain the outbreak in their respective areas. Orders were also given to improve sampling arrangements, upon which 18 vehicles of the Indus Hospital were dedicated for collecting samples from homes. The health officials briefed the Chief Minister about a new machine made at the Wuhan Institute of Virology in China, which could test secretions from the nose instead of testing throat secretion as was the current procedure. At this, the CM directed the provincial Chief Secretary to consult with medical experts whether procuring the machine would be feasible and if they deemed it to be beneficial, place an order for 100 machines. The CM further stated that he would request the federal government for a special aircraft to transport the machines if the government decided to procure them.

On the same day, the local government also arranged to launch a mobile service across the province to provide rations to the needy along with daily wages to those affected by the pandemic. A number was dedicated for the service and those in need could text there. Moreover, a warehouse was established for storage of ration bags and a helpline set up for people to register for acquiring the bags. The CM also ordered to release Rs 341 million for carrying out administrative work under district administrations and spending on facilities provided to pilgrims. Shortly afterward, reports emerged that rations were being denied to minority Hindus and Christians in the coastal areas of Karachi. The Saylani Welfare Trust, carrying out the relief work, said that the aid was reserved for Muslims alone. On 14 April, the US Commission on International Religious Freedom expressed concern with the discrimination. Other organisations, including Edhi Foundation, JDC Welfare Organization and Jamaat-e-Islami are reported to have stepped forward to provide relief to the minorities.

On 27 March, public holidays were extended until 5 April in the province while markets and shopping malls were to remain closed until 10 April. Ajmal Wazir, the adviser to the CM stated that the government had decided on tax exemption to facilitate the business community and protect jobs with Rs 17.5 billion reserved for wheat procurement. An amount of Rs 8 billion was also approved for district hospitals to enable them by the urgent supplies. To further enforce lockdown, the Sindh govt restricted movement between 8 am and 5 pm, while all grocery stores were ordered to be closed by 5 pm. These restrictions went into force on 28 March. Sindh Province also received 500,000 K N95 masks from China. On 29 March, the Sindh CM approved a proposal to release about 4,000 convicts from prison to prevent the spread of the novel coronavirus outbreak in the province's jails.

On 30 March, the Chief Minister, Syed Murad Ali Shah made public a mobile application, namely the Sindh Relief Initiative, on which welfare organisations could register to work with the provincial government for the distribution of ration among daily-wagers at their doorstep. Also on the day, the Mayor of Karachi, Wasim Akhtar designated five cemeteries in the city for burials of those who died due to coronavirus. He said that only a few close relatives of the deceased could enter the cemetery for burial, adding that the body would be brought into the cemetery with protective measures and no last sighting would be allowed. The mayor also wrote to the National Disaster Management Authority, the provincial government and the Governor Imran Ismail requesting funds to provide essential equipment and ventilators to Karachi Metropolitan Corporation hospitals. The Sindh government issued a circular directing private schools across the province to pay full salaries to its teachers on time the same day. Another directive was also declared for factories and other private entities operating in the province to disburse salaries to their employees by 31 March.

On 2 April, the Sindh government extended the lockdown until 14 April. It also announced new restrictions, closing down shrines and other holy sites while suspending inter and intra-city public transport. There was also a restriction on from movement of people from 5:00 pm to 08:00 am except for armed forces personnel, doctors and health professionals, persons requiring immediate medical care and persons on goods transport. The local government purchased 50,000 testing kits for the province in early April.

On 30 July 2021, Chief Minister of Sindh Syed Murad Ali Shah imposed an 8-day partial lockdown in Karachi, the largest city of Sindh to combat the 4th wave of COVID-19 in the city. All non essential shops, educational institutes were closed and dine in/dine out/takeaways were also not allowed in the restaurants. The Federal minister for information & broadcasting Fawad Chaudhry criticised the lockdown measures calling it "an attack on the economy". On 8 August, the Sindh Government ended the lockdown and introduced new restrictions which were far more lenient than the previous one.

On Wednesday 30 June 2022, the Sindh government recorded a COVID-19 Positivity Ratio of 5.4 percent. There has been an increase in reported cases in Karachi, where 4,582 tests were conducted across the province in the past 24 hours out of which 248 persons were tested positive for COVID-19. There are 2,947 active coronavirus cases in the province.

==== Balochistan ====
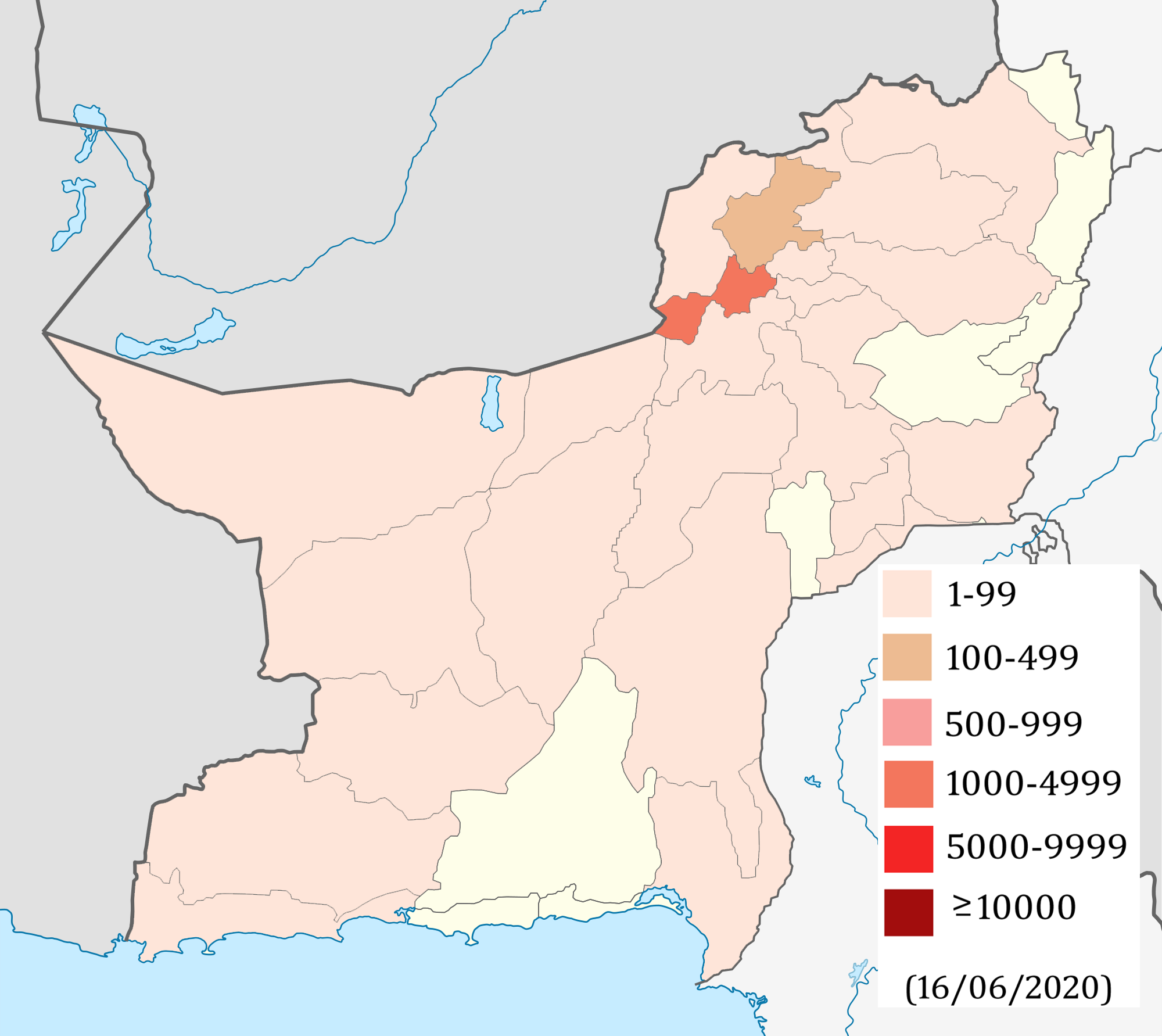
Map of districts with confirmed cases in Balochistan

The Balochistan Government constituted a 14-member technical committee in late January to tackle the outbreak. All schools have been closed until 31 March. Balochistan Minister Sardar Yar Mohammad Rind stated that "action will be taken against schools that do not comply with the decision". Matric exams have also been postponed. The province like others also requested for the army to be deployed.

On 24 March, the Balochistan government imposed a complete lockdown in the entire province until 7 April. It included a complete ban on public getting out of their homes, all kinds of social and religious gatherings or any public or private event. All public and private offices were ordered closed. Exemptions included essential services such as personnel of hospitals, laboratories and medical stores, law enforcement agencies, people in need of urgent medical care with one attendant, one person per family going out to buy grocery and medicines within the vicinity of their residence and burials of people that had died. Only one person was allowed to travel in a private vehicle. Media personnel authorised by concerned media houses and newspaper hawkers were allowed to move freely as well. Public and private telecom companies, essential staff of banks with limited public dealing, defence-related manufacturing industries, food items manufacturing industries and distribution offices, grocery shops, petrol pumps and auto workshops and welfare organisations providing services were given permission to operate. Similar to Gilgit-Baltistan and Islamad, Section 144 was also enforced. A state of emergency was imposed in five districts which bordered Iran on 24 March.

Fumigation was carried out across the entire central jail of Quetta on 30 March, while spray pumps and disinfectants were distributed to 10 districts of the province. On 31 March, the provincial government released Rs 500 million for upgrading, rehabilitation & establishment of quarantine centres in the areas of Quetta, Chaman, Taftan & other areas of Balochistan.

Starting from 2 April, the lockdown in the province was extended until 14 April as per directions by the federal government. On 7 April, the provincial government increased the lockdown period by adding another week, making it last until 21 April. Provincial Finance Minister, Zahoor Buledi announced on 8 April that a tax relief of Rs 1.5 billion would be given during the lockdown.

==== Khyber Pakhtunkhwa ====
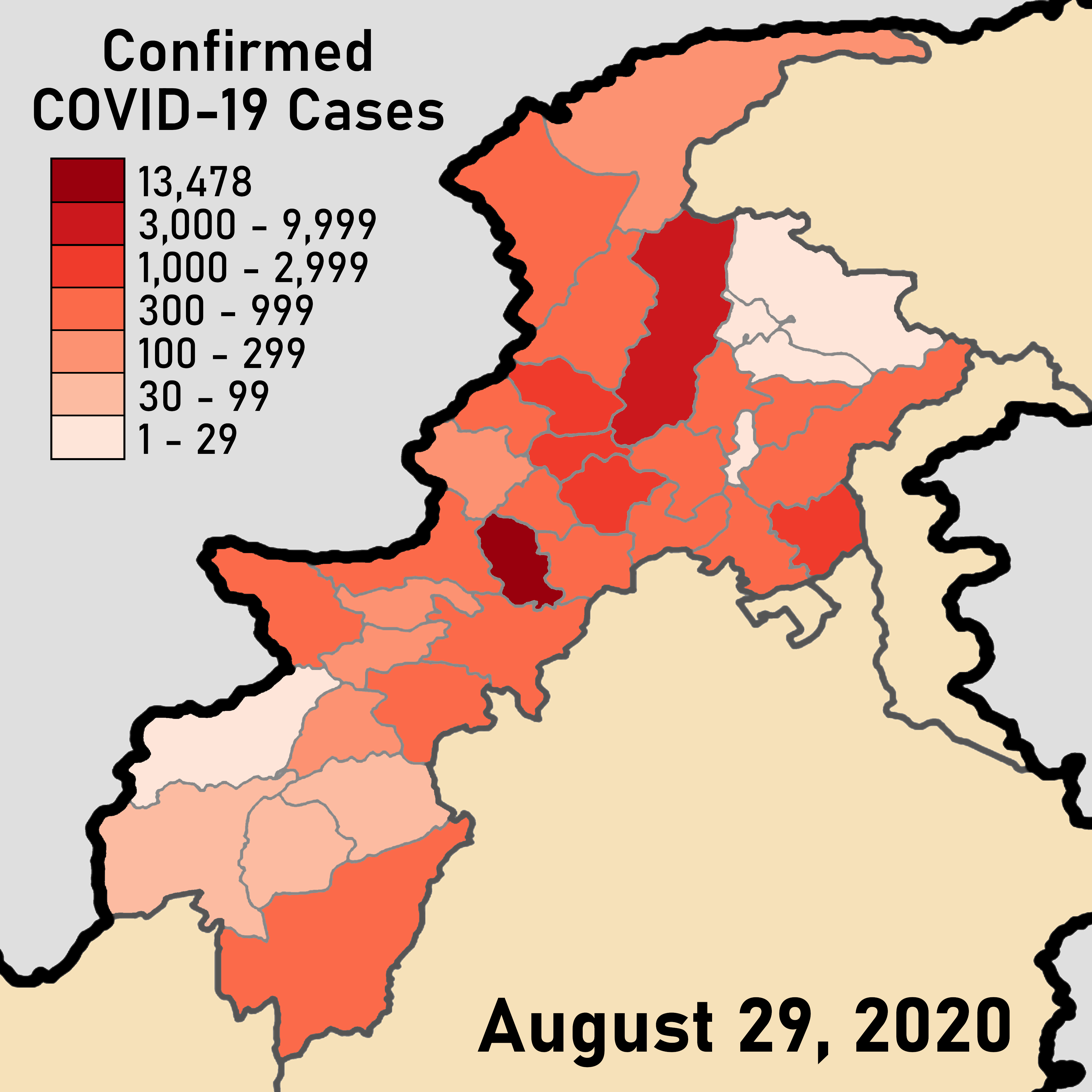
Map of confirmed cases of COVID-19 by district of Khyber Pakhtunkhwa

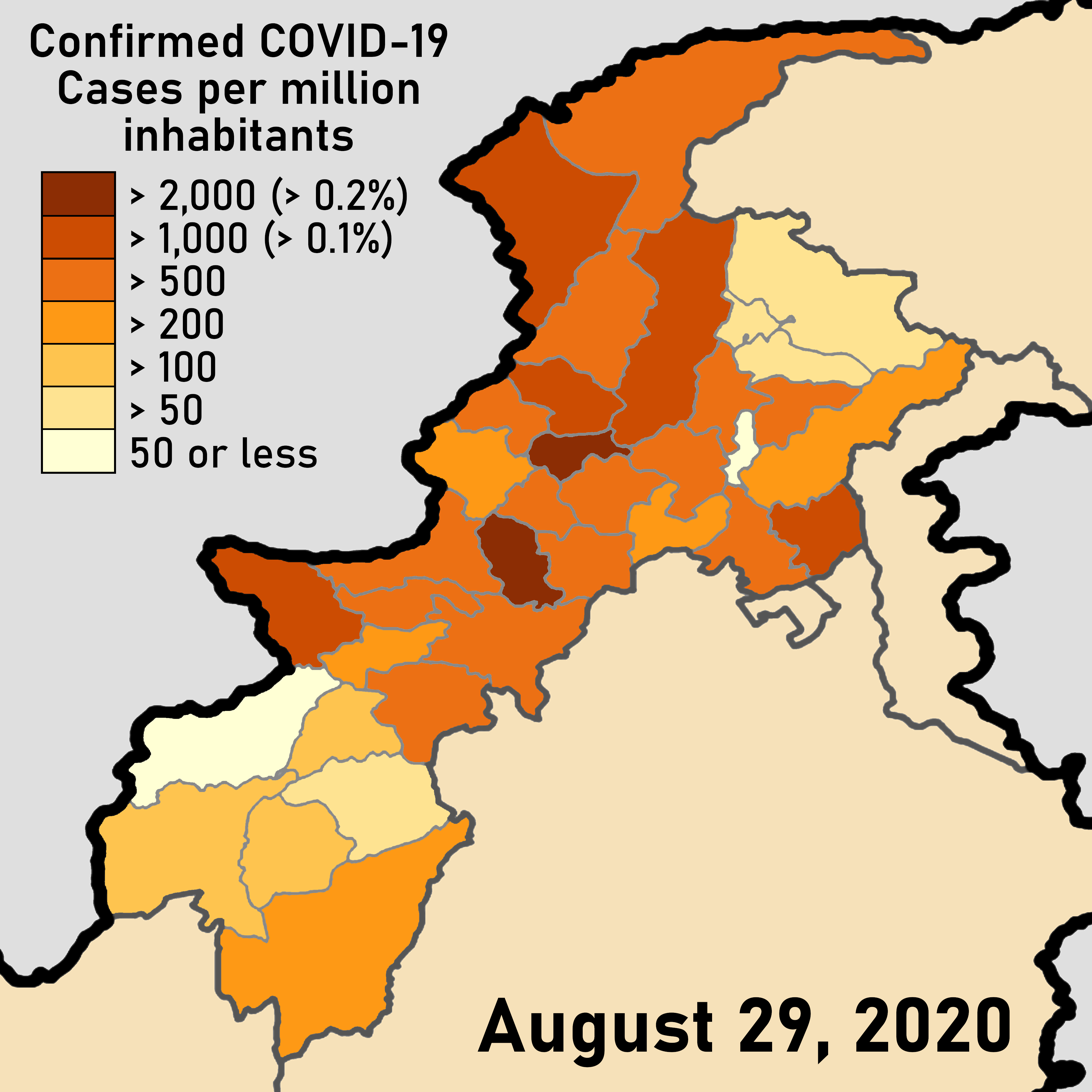
Map of confirmed cases of COVID-19 per million inhabitants by district of Khyber Pakhtunkhwa

The provincial government has closed all educational institutes until 5 April and postponed all public gatherings until further notice as a preventive measure. All inter-district public transport was banned for seven days on 22 March. The province announced a partial lockdown for three days on 23 March.

On 24 March, the Peshawar High Court decided to shut down all courts in the province until 28 March. Only essential staff were allowed to come to courts with no more than one official in the office. On 27 March, screening teams were deputed at all district entry and exit points for screening of visitors of COVID-19 patients.

The Chief Minister of the province Mahmood Khan announced on 26 March that the government had appointed at least 1,300 new doctors on contractual basis across the province to help stem the spread of coronavirus. The KP Public Service Commission also approved the recruitment of 635 more doctors to join the province's health force.

On 29 March, the government approved a Rs 32 billion stimulus economic package to provide relief to the masses and the business community amid the coronavirus crisis. Provincial Information Minister Ajmal Wazir, announced at a press conference that the relief package include Rs 11.4 billion benefiting 1.9 million deserving families, Rs 3,000 would be given under the Ehsaas programme and Rs 2,000 by the KP government. He added that the business community had also been exempted from taxes worth Rs 5 billion and the provincial government had ramped up its testing capacity with 500 new diagnostics kits.

Equipment and supplies including oxygen concentrators, cardiac monitors, infusion pumps, dialysis catheter and other PPE were distributed among all districts of the province on 30 March.

The Provincial Disaster Management Authority (PDMA) dispatched 50,000 N95 masks to departments involved in the fight against coronavirus in the province. A total of 8,000 surgical kits and caps were also given to the health departments, along with 750 litres of sanitizers and 5,000 testing kits. An additional 20,000 testing kits were also provided in early April.

Khyber Pakhtunkhwa (KP) traders' association Sarhad Chamber of Commerce (SCC), were not same page with the government, on one hand was concerned despite business losses on account of lock down other arm of the government cutting electricity supplies on the other hand trading associations not willing to co-operate government's lockdown timing restrictions during Ramzan to recoup their losses.

==== Gilgit-Baltistan ====
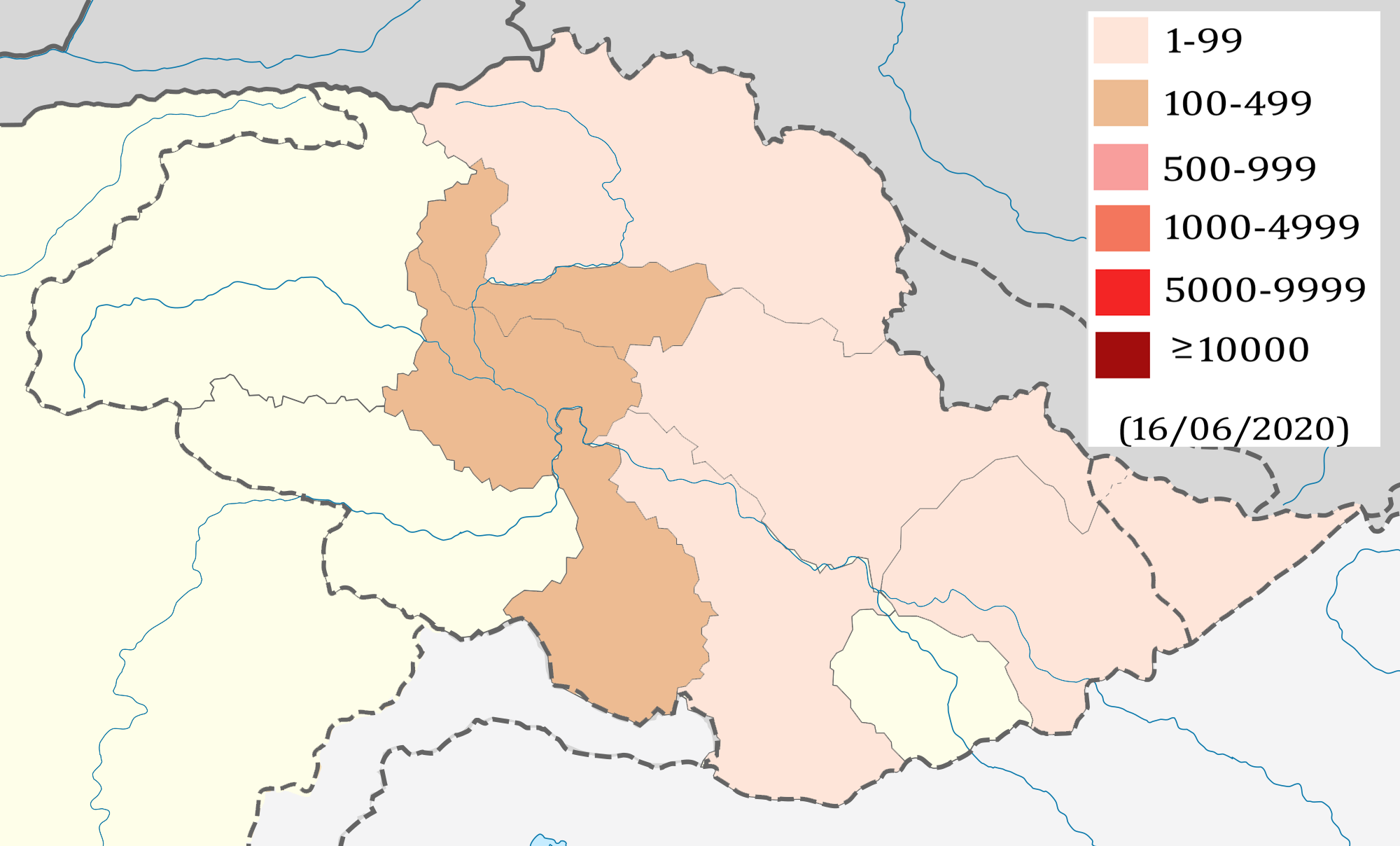
Map of districts with confirmed cases in Gilgit-Baltistan

On 12 March, the region's Government declared medical emergency in the province after more cases of were reported. Educational institutes were further closed until 5 April as a preventive measure. Similar to Islamabad, Section 144 was also imposed on 21 March.

The provincial government decided to put the entire region on lockdown for an indefinite period on 22 March and suspended intercity transport services. Para-military forces were also tasked to ensure the lockdown.

On 27 March, the Chinese government handed medical equipments and 10 tonnes of other goods to the Gilgit-Baltistan government to help it fight COVID-19. The equipment included 5 ventilators, 2,000 N95 masks, 200,000 face masks, 2,000 testing kits and medical protective kits. The same day, the government decided that all suspected travellers coming from the Taftan border would be tested for COVID-19.

The local government announced that all education institutions would further remain closed until 5 April as a preventive measure. On 31 March, the World Health Organization staff got involved in the regions's handling of the outbreak by providing support in terms of data management at district level. Starting from 2 April, the lockdown in the region was extended until 14 April as per directions by the federal government. On 8 April, the local government decided to extend the lockdown until 21 April.

==== Azad Kashmir ====
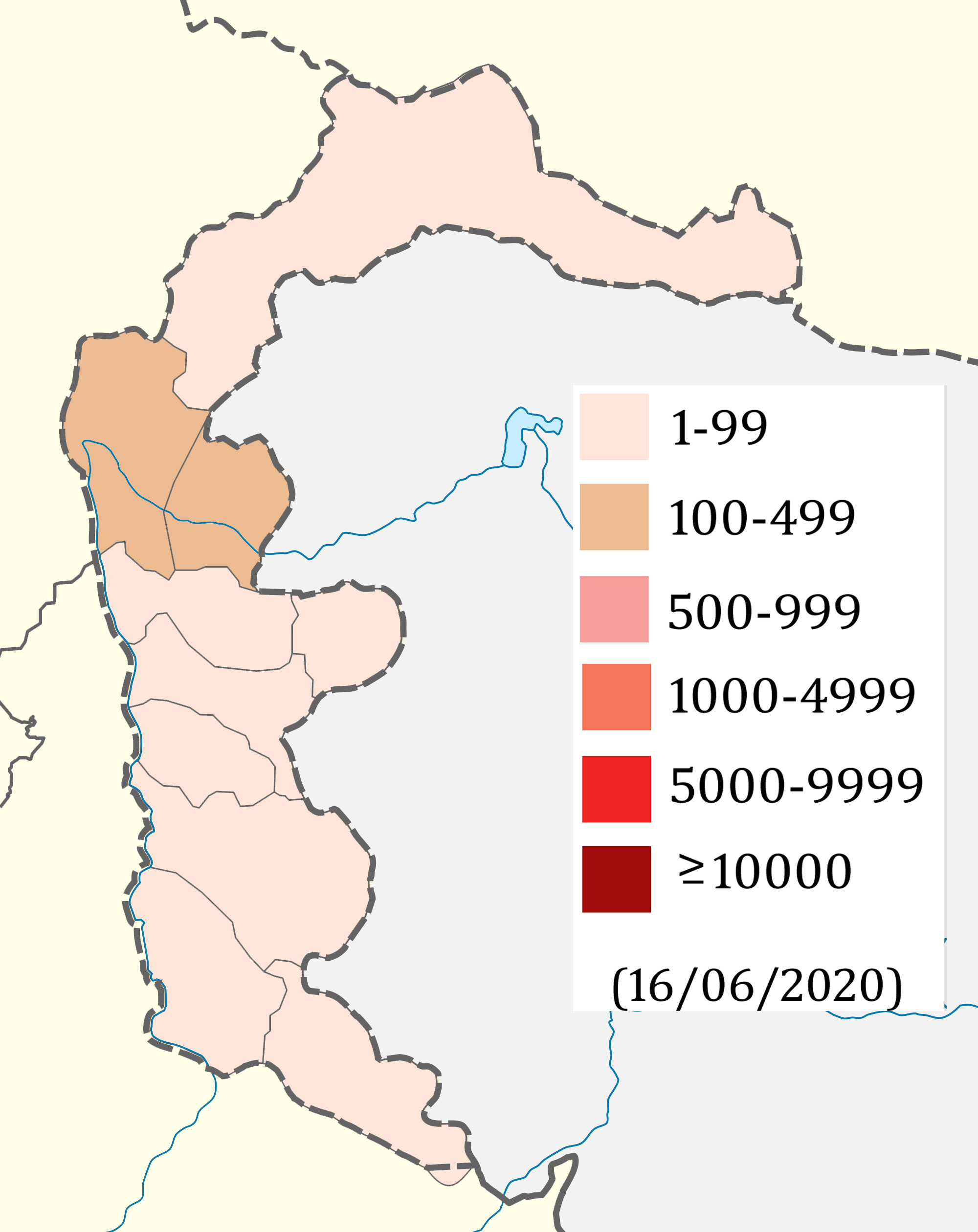
Map of districts with confirmed cases in Azad Kashmir

On 14 March, the local Government declared a health emergency after a meeting of the National Security Council. It also announced closure of educational institutions until 6 April and secondary examinations were postponed. AJK Prime Minister Raja Farooq Haider also stated that screening mechanisms were installed at all 11 points of entry while quarantine facilities were being established in all 10 districts. On 21 March, a suspension of all inter-provincial transport for three days was imposed. No public transport vehicles were allowed to either enter or leave the province. It warned that violators would be punished under the Epidemic Diseases Act.

On 23 March, The AJK Prime Minister announced a 3-week lockdown for the region. Movement was restricted and special passes were issued for journalists and people travelling under inevitable circumstances while only one person from each family was allowed to go out to get food essentials.

Two virology labs at Abbas Institute of Medical Sciences in Muzaffarabad started PCR testing for COVID-19 on 30 March. Starting from 2 April, the lockdown in the region was extended until 14 April as per directions by the federal government.

==== Islamabad ====
On 21 March, the city administration imposed Section 144 on the region for 15 days. All restaurants and shopping malls were ordered to be closed and violators could face legal consequences. The local Union Council in the Bhara Kahu region was sealed after 11 suspected cases emerged from there on 23 March.

On 25 March, the national government shut the outpatient departments of hospitals in the capital territory to stem the spread of the virus, only the emergency services remained optional. The capital's Deputy Commissioner, Hamza Shafqat issued a notification declaring 'a complete ban on intra-city, inter-district and inter-province movement of people by public transport. However, the metro bus service will be functional but at a distance of one seat between passengers.' Furthermore, gatherings of all kinds at public and private places were banned no one was allowed to move out of their respective union councils. Starting from 2 April, the lockdown in the region was extended until 14 April as per directions by the federal government.

== Impact ==
=== Politics ===
On 15 March, in video conference of SAARC nations on coronavirus issue, country's State Minister of Health Zafar Mirza urged India for immediate lifting of the lockdown in Indian-administered Kashmir to allow virus containment measures.

On 22 March, Prime Minister Imran Khan urged the United States President Donald Trump to temporarily lift sanctions on Iran. He stated on Twitter, 'I want to appeal to President Trump on humanitarian grounds to lift the sanctions against Iran until the COVID-19 pandemic is over.'

The same day, the Foreign Minister Shah Mehmood Qureshi raised the issue of external debt faced by the country and how it should be relieved in repayment of loans on the phone with Heiko Maas, the German Foreign Minister. Qureshi reportedly told Maas that united efforts were required for dealing with the pandemic and that debt relief could help Pakistan in better handling of the outbreak in the country. He further stated that sanctions on Iran should be lifted immediately so it could use its own resources to fight the ongoing outbreak there. In response, Maas assured him that the issues would be raised at the forthcoming G7 meeting and the European Union Foreign Ministers' Conference next week. He also echoed the need to lift sanctions on Iran on calls with the French Foreign Minister Jean-Yves Le Drian and the Spanish Foreign Minister Arancha Gonzalez on 24 March.

According to news report of Benazir Shah in Arab News, as of 16 June at least 97 members of national and provincial assemblies across political lines tested positive for COVID-19 and six of them died. In March 2021, Prime Minister Imran Khan also tested positive for the virus.

=== Economy ===
On 2 April, the Government of Pakistan announced that the Pakistani economy had lost Rs 2.5 trillion due to the coronavirus pandemic. Some government programs were maintained through the crisis to keep people employed. For example, the Plant for Pakistan reforestation program was maintained through the pandemic employing 60,000 people. On 2 June, it was reported that mango exports had declined due to the COVID-19 pandemic. On 5 June, the Pakistani Government announced plans to privatize a number of state-run industries, including the state-run Pakistan Steel Mills. Such actions led to the lay off and subsequent unemployment of over 9300 employees.

On 20 June, Pakistan's Ministry of Interior announced that the Torkham and Spin Boldak borders would open for six days a week under strict health measures. On 22 June, Pakistan opened its border crossings with Afghanistan, allowing exports for the first time in three months. On 15 July, Pakistan allowed Afghan exports to India through the Wagah border, after taking COVID-19 measures. On 17 July, China applauded the resumption of trade relations between Afghanistan and Pakistan after five land crossings had opened. The five land crossings were Torkham, Chaman, Ghulam Khan, Angur Ada and Dand-e-Patan.

=== Healthcare professionals ===
The federal government's economic relief package also benefited the healthcare professionals in the country. It was decided that if a doctor or a paramedic died while treating coronavirus patients, they would be considered martyrs and their families would receive the package that is given to martyrs.

Making a landmark, the Pakistani Law enforcement presented the Guard of honour as a mark of respect from 27 to 29 March to the doctors and para medical staff fighting on the front lines of the global COVID-19 outbreak across the country in different cities.

The medical staff of a Mayo hospital in Lahore were given a guard of honour by the Lahore police for their efforts to help Pakistan fight the coronavirus pandemic. Observing social distance (home-quarantined) citizens of Pakistan together with celebrities raised white flags on 27 March across Pakistan from their balconies, rooftops expressing love for the doctors and para-medics who are combating without fearing from the epidemic COVID-19 virus.

The Government of Punjab announced a one-month honorarium for the healthcare workers at the end of March. This meant that in case a healthcare worker died, a martyr package was included in the regional government's relief package. Medical professionals across the province were also provided with one-month additional salary in recognition of their services.

The Guardian interviewed a doctor, who said that the country's mishandling of the outbreak to be "depressing and disturbing". Doctors in Pakistan have complained about the lack of personal protection equipment (PPE) required to deal with the coronavirus, and that without protection doctors have become infected and in turn were infecting other patients. On 6 April, police broke up protests in Quetta by more than 100 doctors, who were demanding better safety equipment. Police arrested 53 doctors involved in these protests, and doctors reported being "beaten and humiliated" by the police.

By 7 May, COVID-19 had infected more than 500 Pakistani healthcare workers. Human Rights Watch criticised the closing of maternity wards in various hospitals due to some healthcare workers becoming infected while attending maternity wards. They alleged this put the already challenged reproductive health of Pakistani women at more risk. According to a recent study, the COVID-19 pandemic has had a tumultuous effect on dentists as well.

=== Sport ===
Fears of the coronavirus disease spreading alarmed the Sindh provincial government, who announced on 13 March that remaining matches of the 2020 Pakistan Super League (PSL), scheduled in Karachi, would be played behind closed doors. Similarly, Pakistan Cricket Board (PCB) offered international players participating in PSL to leave for their home countries (if they wish so), while PSL continues as per schedule. 10 international players and one international staff member opted to leave the tournament. The Final match in Lahore, was rescheduled to 18 March instead of 22 March.

On 17 March 2020, the knockout fixtures (both Semi-finals and Final) of Pakistan Super League (PSL) were indefinitely postponed due to the sudden spike in coronavirus cases in Pakistan.

After six years, when Pakistan Football Federation League returned, the matches were played before 16 March 2020. On 16 March 2020, the Pakistan Football Federation released a notification announcing that the matches were postponed.

The Federal Minister for Inter Provincial Coordination Dr. Fehmida Mirza on 30 March announced to create fund to cover all medical expenses of sports persons infected with COVID-19 in Pakistan.

=== Religion ===
Social distancing being important step to be followed by all to combat COVID-19 pandemic, some religious activities came under critical lens in Pakistan. Returning devotees from Iran, a Tablighi Jamaat religious gathering and prayer congregations became a cause of concern due to their potential to exacerbate the outbreak in the country. However, sops were followed during Eid Ul Adha and hence there was no spike in the cases reported.

Cardinal Joseph Coutts of the Catholic Church implored the faithful to follow proper measures to prevent the spread of the coronavirus and encouraged interfaith solidarity amidst the pandemic:

"I also call upon my Christian brethren who would want to come to churches on Friday and Sunday to avoid large gatherings. In the end, the Almighty will reward you for your intentions. If we can't go to a church, mosque or temple, we can pray or worship at home with our families, God shall hear us. We, the people of all faiths, should pray to God to save us from this plague."

=== Unemployment ===
The Ministry of Planning has estimated that 12.3 million to 18.5 million people will become jobless due to pandemic. Moreover, it is estimated that the number of unemployed people in Pakistan will reach 6.65 million in the 2020–2021 fiscal year, compared to 5.80 million in the previous fiscal year. The COVID-19 pandemic is cited to be one of the largest factors causing the increase in the unemployment rate, particularly among vulnerable employment groups and daily wage workers.

As of July 2021, about 20.7 million workers in Pakistan were jobless due to COVID-19 lockdowns and other restrictions.

End of Mandatory SOPs

On March 16, Head of NCOC, Assad Umar announced to end mandatory SOPs except vaccination. In a media talk, he said that government may impose restrictions again if ratio of cases surges. According to Assad, the decision has been taken due to continuous decline of Coronavirus.

== See also ==
- Timeline of the COVID-19 pandemic in Pakistan
  - 2020 Tablighi Jamaat COVID-19 hotspot in Pakistan
- COVID-19 pandemic in Asia
  - COVID-19 pandemic in South Asia
- 2020 in Pakistan
- Pakistan's Corona Relief Tiger Force
- National Command and Operation Center (NCOC)

== Notes ==
A. As of 27 April 2020
