= Institute of Virology =

Institute of Virology or Virology Institute may refer to:

- Institute of Advanced Virology, Kerala, India
- National Institute of Virology, India
- National Institute of Virology (Pakistan), Pakistan
- Virology Institute of the Philippines, Philippines
- Wuhan Institute of Virology, China
