= Haider Abbas Rizvi =

Pakistani politician

Syed Haider Abbas Rizvi NI
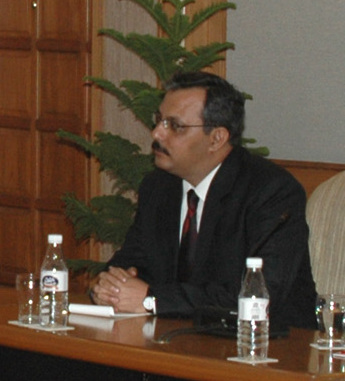
- Haider Abbas Rizvi in 2006

Member of National Assembly of Pakistan
- In office February 2008 – December 2012
- Constituency: NA-253 (Karachi-XV)
- In office 2002–2008
- Constituency: NA-244 (Karachi-VI)

Personal details
- Born: Syed Haidar Abbas Rizvi; 1 January 1968 (age 58) Karachi, Sindh, Pakistan
- Party: MQM-P (2023-present)
- Other political affiliations: MQM-L (2002-2012)
- Spouse: Nusrat
- Children: Rajal Rizvi, Sabika Rizvi, Zyra Rizvi, Salaar Rizvi
- Education: Chemical Engineering
- Alma mater: University of Karachi; University of Detroit
- Occupation: Politician
- Profession: Engineering Management Consultant
- Committees: National Security; Public Accounts; Rules, Business, Procedures & Privileges; Foreign Affairs; Kashmir Affairs
- Awards: Nishan-e-Imtiaz

Syed Haider Abbas Rizvi (Urdu: سيد حیدر عباس رضوی; born 1 January 1968) is a Pakistani-Canadian former politician and the former deputy parliamentary leader of MQM who had been the member of National Assembly of Pakistan from 2008 to 2012. Previously, he served as member of National Assembly of Pakistan from 2002 to 2008.

== Education ==
Rizvi has completed his M.Sc. degree in Applied Chemistry in 1992 from the University of Karachi and M.Sc. Chemical Engineering in 1998 from University of Detroit Mercy, U.S.A. He is an Engineering Management Consultant by profession. He is also qualified as a lead Auditor for ISO 9000, Lead Auditor for ISO 14000 and has attended a wide range of management training courses. He was also a former director of Pakistan National Shipping Corporation (PNSC).

== Political career ==
He was first elected to the National Assembly of Pakistan as a candidate of Muttahida Qaumi Movement (MQM) from constituency NA-244 (Karachi-VI) in the 2002 Pakistani general election by receiving by 54,101 votes.

He was re-elected to the National Assembly as a candidate of MQM from constituency NA-253 (Karachi-XV) in the 2008 Pakistani general election receiving 96,973 votes.

He resigned from his National Assembly seat in December 2012 due to having dual nationality.

== Personal life ==
Haidar Abbas Rizvi has two sons and two daughters. He has travelled to the Georgia, Tanzania, Estonia and Ivory Coast. His interests include reading Urdu literature, writing Urdu poetry, playing cricket and chess. He is a member of Young Parliamentarians Forum (YPF) Pakistan. In 2018, he was reported to be employed as an Uber driver in Canada.

== Awards ==
Year	Award	Result	Note	Ref.
2011	Nishan-e-Imtiaz	Won	Awarded by Asif Ali Zardari (President)	
