= Sheikh Salahuddin (Karachi politician) =

Politician

- شیخ صلاح الدین
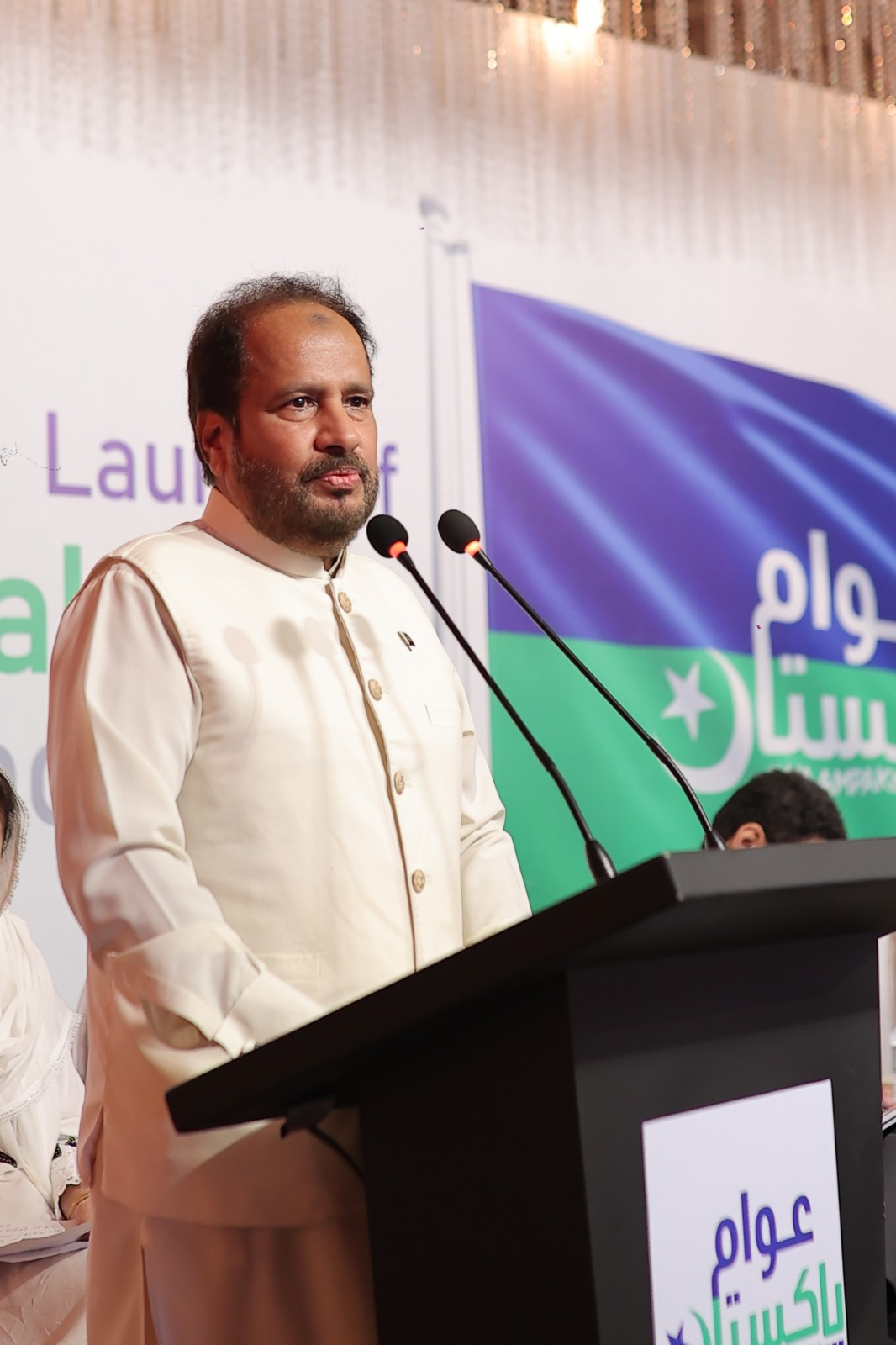
- Sheikh Salahuddin in 2024

Member of the National Assembly of Pakistan
- In office 1 June 2013 – 31 May 2018
- Constituency: NA-244 (Karachi-VI)
- In office 17 March 2008 – 16 March 2013
- Constituency: NA-244 (Karachi-VI)

Personal details
- Born: 29 August 1956 (age 70) Karachi, Sindh, Pakistan
- Party: AP (2024–present)
- Other political affiliations: MQM-P (2016–2024); MQM-L (1988–2016)

Sheikh Salahuddin (Urdu: شیخ صلاح الدین; born 29 August 1956) is a Muhajir Pakistani politician who had been a member of the National Assembly of Pakistan, from 2008 to May 2018.

== Early life and education ==
He was born on 29 August 1956. He completed his higher education at the University of Karachi, graduating with a bachelor’s degree.

== Political career ==
Salahuddin joined the Muttahida Qaumi Movement (MQM) in 1988 after previously being associated with the party as a sympathiser. In the same year, he was appointed as the party’s finance secretary for the United Arab Emirates (UAE). In 1992, he was promoted as the MQM organiser for the UAE, where he also oversaw the party’s organisational structure in Qatar.

He was elected to the National Assembly of Pakistan as a candidate of Muttahida Qaumi Movement (MQM) from Constituency NA-244 (Karachi-VI) in the 2008 Pakistani general election. He received 174,044 votes - one of the highest vote-totals achieved by any National Assembly candidate in the 2008 general election. and defeated Mir Wali, a candidate of Muttahida Majlis-e-Amal (MMA).

He was re-elected to the National Assembly as a candidate of MQM from Constituency NA-244 (Karachi-VI) in the 2013 Pakistani general election. He received 133,885 votes and defeated Khalid Masood Khan, a candidate of Pakistan Tehreek-e-Insaf (PTI).

== Parliamentary roles ==
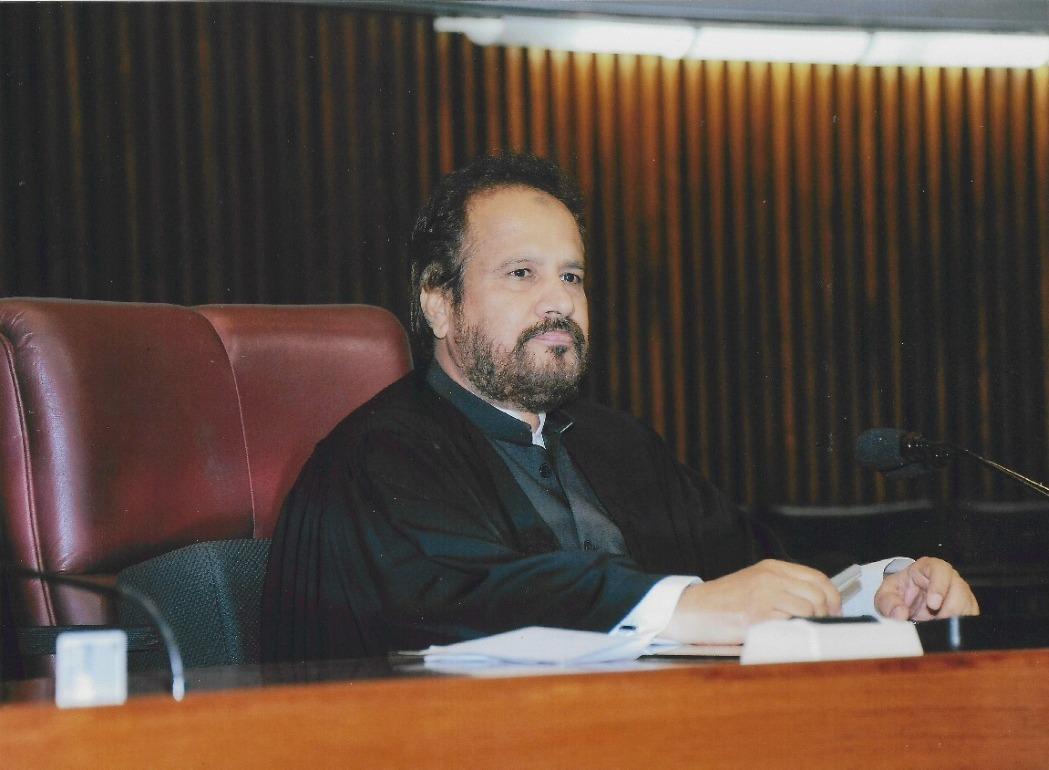
Presiding over a session of the National Assembly as Chairpersons.

During his tenure in the National Assembly, Salahuddin served on the Panel of Chairpersons, a group of MNAs nominated by the Speaker to preside over sittings in the absence of the Speaker and Deputy Speaker. He also chaired the Assembly sessions as an acting chairperson.

He served on parliamentary governance bodies, including the Board of Governors of the Pakistan Institute for Parliamentary Services (PIPS) for the 2016–17 term.

Salahuddin was also listed among parliamentarians involved with Overseas Pakistanis Foundation (OPF) related matters handled by National Assembly committees.

== Later developments ==
In June 2024, Salahuddin left the MQM-P and joined the newly formed political party Awaam Pakistan, citing changing political alignments. He was listed among the founding members and joined the party’s organising committee.

Following the political restructuring of MQM after 2016, he had remained aligned with the Pakistan-based faction (MQM-P) until his departure in 2024. According to The Express Tribune, he joined Awaam Pakistan after remaining in contact with Shahid Khaqan Abbasi and Miftah Ismail during the party’s formation.
