= Muhammad Iqbal Khan =

Member of the National Assembly of Pakistan from Karachi (2024–2029)

- محمد اقبال خان

Member of the National Assembly of Pakistan
- Incumbent
- Assumed office 29 February 2024
- Constituency: NA-235 Karachi East-I

Personal details
- Born: Karachi, Sindh, Pakistan
- Party: MQM-P (2024-present)

Muhammad Iqbal Khan (Urdu: محمد اقبال خان) is a Pakistani politician who has been a member of the National Assembly of Pakistan since February 2024.

== Political career ==
Khan won the 2024 Pakistani general election from NA-235 Karachi East-I as a Muttahida Qaumi Movement – Pakistan candidate. He received 20,185 votes while runner up Independent Supported (PTI) Pakistan Tehreek-e-Insaf, candidate Saifur Rehman Khan received 14,167 votes.
