= Uzma Qadri =

Pakistani politician

Syeda Uzma Qadri

Member of the Provincial Assembly of the Punjab
- In office 2018–2023
- Constituency: Reserved for women
- In office 2013–2018
- Constituency: Reserved for women
- In office 2002–2007
- Constituency: Reserved for women

Personal details
- Party: AP (2025-present)
- Other political affiliations: PMLN (2002-2024)
- Relations: Zaeem Qadri (husband)

Syeda Uzma Qadri is a Pakistani politician who had been a member of the Provincial Assembly of the Punjab between 2013 and 2023.

Her husband Zaeem Qadri was also a Member of Punjab Assembly from 2008 to 2018.
