= Usama Qadri =

Pakistani politician

Member of the National Assembly of Pakistan
- In office 13 August 2018 – 10 August 2023
- Constituency: NA-253 (Karachi Central-I)

Personal details
- Born: Karachi, Sindh, Pakistan
- Party: MQM-P (2018–present)

Usama Qadri (Urdu: اسامہ قادری) is a Pakistani politician who had been a member of the National Assembly of Pakistan from August 2018 till August 2023.

== Political career ==
He was elected to the National Assembly of Pakistan from Constituency NA-253 (Karachi Central-I) as a candidate of Muttahida Qaumi Movement in the 2018 Pakistani general election.

== More Reading ==
- List of members of the 15th National Assembly of Pakistan
- No-confidence motion against Imran Khan
