= NA-235 Karachi East-I =

Constituency of the National Assembly of Pakistan

- Constituency for the National Assembly of Pakistan
- Region: Gulzar-e-Hijri town of Karachi East District in Karachi
- Electorate: 170,176

Current constituency
- Party: MQM-P
- Member: Muhammad Iqbal Khan
- Created from: NA-253 Karachi-XV

NA-235 Karachi East-I (این اے-235، کراچی مشرقی-1) is a constituency for the National Assembly of Pakistan. After the 2018 delimitations, Gulshan-e-Iqbal part of the former NA-253 is now in NA-243 (Karachi East-II).

== Assembly Segments ==
Constituency number	Constituency	District	Current MPA	Party
97	PS-97 Karachi East-I	Karachi East	Rana Shoukat Ali	MQM-P
98	PS-98 Karachi East-II	Karachi East	Arsalan Perwaiz Siddiqui	MQM-P

== Members of Parliament ==
=== 2018–2023: NA-242 Karachi East-I ===
Election	Member	Party
2018	Saifur Rehman Khan	PTI

=== 2024–present: NA-235 Karachi East-I ===
Election	Member	Party
2024	Muhammad Iqbal Khan	MQM–P

== Election 2002 ==
General elections were held on 10 October 2002. Asad Ullah Bhutto of Muttahida Majlis-e-Amal won by 28,840 votes.

General election 2002: NA-253 Karachi East-XV
Party	Candidate	Votes	%	±%
MMA	Asadullah Bhutto	28,840	36.18	
MQM	Dr. Muhammad Fahimud-Din	25,960	32.57	
PPP	Shafi Muhammad Shah	13,947	17.50	
PTI	Ali Haider Zaidi	4,374	5.49	
PMA	Moinuddin	2,401	3.01	
Others	Others (thirteen candidates)	4,181	5.25	
Turnout		80,804	32.40	
Total valid votes		79,703	98.64	
Rejected ballots		1,101	1.36	
Majority		2,880	3.61	
Registered electors		249,365		

== Election 2008 ==
General elections were held on 18 February 2008. Syed Haider Abbas Rizvi of Muttahida Qaumi Movement won by 96,973 votes.

General election 2008: NA-253 Karachi East-XV
Party	Candidate	Votes	%	±%
MQM	Haider Abbas Rizvi	96,973	63.45	
PPP	Faisal Raza Abidi	47,101	30.82	
Others	Others (sixteen candidates)	8,769	5.73	
Turnout		155,587	36.76	
Total valid votes		152,843	98.24	
Rejected ballots		2,744	1.76	
Majority		49,872	32.63	
Registered electors		423,284		
MQM hold				

== Election 2013 ==
General elections were held on 11 May 2013. Muhammad Muzammil Qureshi of Muttahida Qaumi Movement won by 101,386 votes and became the member of National Assembly.

General election 2013: NA-253 Karachi East-XV
Party	Candidate	Votes	%	±%
MQM	Muhammad Muzammil Qureshi	101,386	50.49	
PTI	Muhammad Ashraf Jabbar Qureshi	61,913	30.83	
JI	Asadullah Bhutto	12,651	6.30	
PPP	Muhammad Murad Baloch	10,127	5.04	
MDM	Abdul Majeed Pitafi	8,242	4.10	
MWM	Syed Asghar Abbas Zaidi	4,633	2.31	
Others	Others (twenty four candidates)	1,860	0.93	
Turnout		211,768	40.74	
Total valid votes		200,812	94.83	
Rejected ballots		10,956	5.17	
Majority		39,473	19.66	
Registered electors		519,854		
MQM hold				

== Election 2018 ==
General election 2018: NA-242 Karachi East-I
Party	Candidate	Votes	%	±%
PTI	Saifur Rehman Khan	27,333	38.65	
PPP	Muhammad Iqbal Sand	11,823	16.72	
MMA	Asadullah Bhutto	8,262	11.68	
PML(N)	Haji Sharafat Khan	7,060	9.98	
MQM-P	Kishwer Zehra	6,393	9.04	
Others	Others (fourteen candidates)	8,179	11.57	
Turnout		70,711	38.56	
Rejected ballots		1,661	2.36	
Majority		15,510	21.93	
Registered electors		183,373		
PTI gain from MQM-P				

== Election 2024 ==
General elections were held on 8 February 2024. Muhammad Iqbal Khan won the election with 20,185 votes.

General election 2024: NA-235 Karachi East-I
Party	Candidate	Votes	%	±%
MQM-P	Muhammad Iqbal Khan	20,185	30.01	▲20.97
PTI	Saifur Rehman Khan (Note: Filed nomination papers as PTI candidate but ECP allowed him to run as an Independent)	14,167	21.06	▼17.59
PPP	Muhammad Asif Khan	11,431	17.00	▲0.28
JI	Meraj Ul Huda Siddiqui	6,652	9.89	N/A
PML(N)	Sharafat Khan	5,041	7.49	▼2.49
Others	Others (Twenty candidates)	9,784	14.55	
Turnout		68,933	40.51	▲1.95
Total valid votes		67,260	97.57	
Rejected ballots		1,673	2.43	
Majority		6,018	8.95	
Registered electors		170,181		
MQM-P gain from PTI				

== See also ==
- NA-234 Karachi Korangi-III
- NA-236 Karachi East-II
