= Zaeem Qadri =

Pakistani politician (1964–2026)

- زعیم قادری

Member of the Provincial Assembly of the Punjab
- In office 2008 – 31 May 2018

Personal details
- Born: 25 December 1964 Lahore, West Pakistan, Pakistan
- Died: 13 February 2026 (aged 61) Lahore, Punjab, Pakistan
- Party: AP (2024–2026)
- Other political affiliations: PMLN (2008–2018)
- Spouse: Uzma Qadri

Punjab Assembly Lahore

Syed Zaeem Hussain Qadri (Punjabi: زعیم قادری; 25 December 1964 – 13 February 2026) was a Pakistani lawyer and politician who was a member of the Provincial Assembly of the Punjab from 2008 to May 2018 and Executive Member of Lahore Gymkhana Club.

Before quitting it in 2018, he was an important member of the Pakistan Muslim League (N) party, being a provincial minister, an adviser to the chief minister Shehbaz Sharif, as well as Punjab government's spokesman.

== Early life and education ==
Qadri was born in Lahore, West Pakistan, Pakistan on 25 December 1964. His uncle Syed Shamim Hussain Qadri has served as the Chief Justice Lahore High Court and has also been a politician.

He had the degree of LL. B. the Bachelor of Laws which he obtained in 1988 from Quaid-e-Azam Law College and a degree of the Master of Business Administration which he received in 1991 from the Canadian School of Management Sciences.

Qadri married fellow politician Uzma Qadri.

== Political career ==
=== Pakistan Muslim League (N) ===
Qadri was jailed in 2006 for a brief period of time due to his protest on Jyllands-Posten Muhammad cartoons controversy.

He was elected to the Provincial Assembly of the Punjab as a candidate of Pakistan Muslim League (N) (PML-N) from Constituency PP-154 (Lahore-XIII) in by-polls held in June 2008. He received 8,211 votes.

Qadri was re-elected to the Provincial Assembly of the Punjab as a candidate of PML-N from Constituency PP-154 (Lahore-XIII) in the 2013 Pakistani general election. In November 2016, he was inducted into the provincial Punjab cabinet of Chief Minister Shehbaz Sharif and was made Provincial Minister of Punjab for Auqaf and Religious Affairs.

=== Quitting the Pakistan Muslim League (N) ===
In June 2018, he quit PML-N and announced to contest the 2018 general election as an independent candidate. His rivalry with Hamza Shahbaz was the reason behind the decision.

== Death ==
Qadri died from a heart attack in Lahore, on 13 February 2026, at the age of 61.
