= Muzammil Qureshi =

Pakistani politician (born 1979)

Member of the National Assembly of Pakistan
- In office 1 June 2013 – 31 May 2018
- Constituency: NA-253 (Karachi-XV)

Personal details
- Born: 9 February 1979 (age 47) Karachi, Sindh, Pakistan
- Party: PMLN (2025-present)
- Other political affiliations: PPP (2023-2025); MQM-P (2018-2023); PSP (2018-2023); MQM-L (2008-2018)

Muhammad Muzammil Qureshi (Urdu: محمد مزمل قریشی; born 9 February 1979) is a Pakistani politician who had been a member of the National Assembly of Pakistan from June 2013 to May 2018. Previously he had been a member of the Provincial Assembly of Sindh from 2008 to 2013.

== Early life and education ==
He was born on 9 February 1979 in Karachi.

He has done Master of Arts in Political Science from the Federal Urdu University and Bachelor of Arts from the University of Karachi.

== Political career ==
He was elected to the Provincial Assembly of Sindh as a candidate of Muttahida Qaumi Movement (MQM) from Constituency PS-118 (Karachi-XXX) in the 2008 Sindh provincial election. He received 44,811 votes and defeated Qazi Iftikhar Ahmed Qureshi, a candidate of Pakistan Peoples Party (PPP).

He was elected to the National Assembly of Pakistan as a candidate of MQM from Constituency NA-253 (Karachi-XV) in the 2013 Pakistani general election. He received 101,386 votes and defeated Muhammad Ashraf Jabbar Qureshi, a candidate of Pakistan Tehreek-e-Insaf (PTI).

In April 2018, he quit MQM and joined Pak Sarzameen Party (PSP).

On 21 November 2023, he left the MQM-P and joined the PPP.
