= NA-247 Karachi Central-I =

Constituency of the National Assembly of Pakistan

- Constituency for the National Assembly of Pakistan
- Region: New Karachi Town (partly) of Karachi Central District in Karachi
- Electorate: 451,867

Current constituency
- Party: MQM-P
- Member: Khawaja Izharul Hassan
- Created from: NA-244 Karachi-VI

NA-247 Karachi Central-I (این اے-247، کراچی وسطی-1) is a constituency for the National Assembly of Pakistan that encompasses most of New Karachi.

== Assembly Segments ==
Constituency number	Constituency	District	Current MPA	Party
122	PS-122 Karachi Central-I	Karachi Central	Rehan Akram Mirza	MQM-P
123	PS-123 Karachi Central-II	Karachi Central	Abdul Waseem	MQM-P

== Members of Parliament ==
=== 2018–2023: NA-253 Karachi Central-I ===
Election	Member	Party
2018	Usama Qadri	MQM-P

=== 2024–present: NA-247 Karachi Central-I ===
Election	Member	Party
2024	Khawaja Izharul Hassan	MQM-P

== Election 2002 ==
General elections were held on 10 October 2002. Syed Haider Abbas Rizvi of Muttahida Qaumi Movement won by 54,101 votes.

General election 2002: NA-244 Karachi Central-VI
Party	Candidate	Votes	%	±%
MQM	Haider Abbas Rizvi	54,101	56.82	
MMA	Dr. Meiraj-Ul-Huda Siddiqui	28,559	29.99	
PST	Saqib Ishtiaq Qadri	7,141	7.50	
NA	Javed Jabbar	2,057	2.16	
Others	Others (five candidates)	3,363	3.53	
Turnout		95,248	40.24	
Total valid votes		95,221	99.97	
Rejected ballots		27	0.03	
Majority		25,542	26.83	
Registered electors		236,700		
MQM hold				

== Election 2008 ==
General elections were held on 18 February 2008. Sheikh Salahuddin of Muttahida Qaumi Movement won by 174,044 votes.

General election 2008: NA-244 Karachi Central-VI
Party	Candidate	Votes	%	±%
MQM	Sheikh Salahuddin	174,044	93.78	
PPP	Ghulam Qadir	9,271	5.00	
Others	Others (three candidates)	2,266	1.22	
Turnout		187,073	64.31	
Total valid votes		185,581	99.20	
Rejected ballots		1,492	0.80	
Majority		164,773	88.78	
Registered electors		290,891		
MQM hold				

== Election 2013 ==
General elections were held on 11 May 2013. Sheikh Salahuddin of Muttahida Qaumi Movement won by 133,885 votes and became the member of National Assembly.

General election 2013: NA-244 Karachi Central-VI
Party	Candidate	Votes	%	±%
MQM	Sheikh Salahuddin	133,885	74.16	
PTI	Khalid Masood Khan	26,495	14.68	
JI	Syed Muhammad Bilal	9,230	5.11	
MDM	Abdul Hai Sheikh	7,045	3.90	
Others	Others (nine candidates)	3,869	2.15	
Turnout		194,429	61.01	
Total valid votes		180,524	92.85	
Rejected ballots		13,905	7.15	
Majority		107,390	59.48	
Registered electors		318,697		
MQM hold				

== Election 2018 ==
General elections were held on 25 July 2018.

General election 2018: NA-253 Karachi Central-I
Party	Candidate	Votes	%	±%
MQM-P	Usama Qadri	52,426	34.48	
PTI	Muhammad Ashraf Jabbar	39,145	25.75	
TLP	Mufti Muhammad Amjad Ali Qadri	24,794	16.31	
PSP	Syed Mustafa Kamal	12,891	8.48	
MMA	Munim Zafar Khan	9,357	6.15	
PML(N)	Khalid Mumtaz Advocate	6,763	4.45	
Others	Others (thirteen candidates)	6,670	4.38	
Turnout		154,016	38.12	
Total valid votes		152,046	98.72	
Rejected ballots		1,970	1.28	
Majority		13,281	8.73	
Registered electors		404,053		
MQM-P^{†} hold		Swing	N/A	

^{†}MQM-P is considered heir apparent to MQM

== Election 2024 ==
General elections were held on 8 February 2024. Khawaja Izharul Hassan won the election with 65,050 votes.

General election 2024: NA-247 Karachi Central-I
Party	Candidate	Votes	%	±%
MQM-P	Khawaja Izharul Hassan	65,050	34.69	▲0.21
PTI	Syed Abbas Husnain (Note: Filed nomination papers as PTI candidate but ECP allowed him to run as an Independent)	52,058	27.85	▲2.10
JI	Monem Zafar Khan	23,863	12.76	N/A
TLP	Muhammad Farooq	14,863	7.95	▼8.36
Independent	Syed Muhammad Asif Raza	10,323	5.52	N/A
PPP	Sheikh Muhammad Maaz Feroz	6,355	3.40	▲1.25
Others	Others (twenty one candidates)	14,468	7.74	
Turnout		190,115	43.51	▲5.39
Total valid votes		186,953	98.34	
Rejected ballots		3,162	1.66	
Majority		12,992	6.95	
Registered electors		436,934		
MQM-P hold				

== See also ==
- NA-246 Karachi West-III
- NA-248 Karachi Central-II
