= National Command and Operation Center =

Pakistan COVID-19 response coordination center

Agency overview
- Formed: April 2020
- Dissolved: March 31, 2022
- Jurisdiction: Government of Pakistan
- Headquarters: Islamabad, Pakistan
- Motto: Together we rise and rise again
- Agency executives: Asad Umar, Chairman; Lt Gen Hamood uz Zaman, National Coordinator
- Parent department: National Coordination Committee, Prime Minister Secretariat
- Website: https://ncoc.gov.pk/

The National Command and Operation Center (NCOC) (April 2020-April 2022) was the principal body governing the policies and implementation of the national COVID-19 effort of Pakistan. It was formed in April 2020 on the orders of the Prime Minister of Pakistan Imran Khan to collate, analyze, and process information received from all provinces, AJK, Gilgit-Baltistan, and the Capital Territory. It also makes recommendations to the National Coordination Committee (NCC), which is headed by the Prime Minister for timely interventions relating to the national COVID-19 response effort.

== Formation ==
The initial response to the COVID-19 pandemic early 2020 was led by the National Disaster Management Authority. The NDMA was formed to tackle traditional emergencies, and was adept at procuring and delivering emergency and relief supplies, but was unable to launch a national response against challenges posed by a pandemic like COVID-19. Pakistan's initial response was marred by confusions partly due to Imran Khan's reluctance on imposing a complete lockdown due to the economic effects and difficulties faced by the poorer segment of society, and due to the divisions within the federal cabinet. NCOC was envisioned for three major tasks:

1. Use of technology in helping understand data and to draw insights from it.
2. Clear and effective public messaging and education of the masses during the COVID-19 pandemic.
3. Coherent governance and policy recommendations to ensure consistency and predictability in the national response.

It was formed by the combination of the federal government, the four provincial governments and the regional governments. It includes experts from the civil sector as well as the Pakistan Army.

== Close Down ==
On 1 April 2022, Minister for Planning, Development and Special Initiatives Asad Umar announced the closure of National Command and Operation Center (NCOC) operations because of all time low COVID-19 indicators and high levels of vaccination.

== See also ==
- COVID-19 pandemic in Pakistan
- National Disaster Management Authority (Pakistan)
