= Zafar Mirza =

Pakistani public health professional

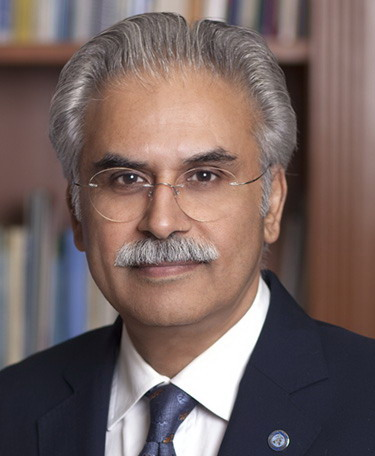
- Zafar Mirza in 2017

Special Assistant for Nation Health Services, Regulation and Coordination
- In office 23 April 2019 – 29 July 2020
- President: Arif Alvi
- Prime Minister: Imran Khan
- Preceded by: Aamir Mehmood Kiani
- Succeeded by: Faisal Sultan (special assistant to prime minister on Health)

Personal details
- Party: AP (2024–present)
- Other political affiliations: PTI (2019-2024)

Zafar Mirza is a Pakistani public health professional who served as the special assistant to the prime minister Imran Khan for Health from 2019 to 2020 and minister of state in the Ministry of National Health Services, Regulation and Coordination. He was appointed to this role by then-prime minister Imran Khan on 23 April 2019. He is one of the founding members of Awaam Pakistan political party.

Mirza also worked with the World Health Organization (WHO), having held positions in Geneva and Cairo, including team leader for Public Health, Innovation, and Intellectual Property, and director of Health System Development. He is currently a professor of Health System & Population Health at Shifa Tameer-e-Millat University.

== Career ==
Zafar Mirza has served as the Director of Healthcare System Development at the WHO Regional Office for the Eastern Mediterranean. He is a medical doctor with post-graduate degree in Public Health in Developing Countries from London School of Hygiene and Tropical Medicine. He also served as a regional adviser for Essential Medicines and Pharmaceutical Policies in the WHO regional office for seven years prior to moving to WHO headquarters. For 12 years before joining WHO, he was a founder executive director of The Network for Consumer Protection in Pakistan.

Mizra has experience working at national, regional and global levels in public and private health sectors. He has extensively travelled, published and contributed to improving public health in many countries.

On 6 July 2020, Mirza tested positive for COVID-19.

On 29 July 2020, Mirza announced that he was resigning from his post as Special Assistant to Prime Minister on Health. The resignation was accepted by the prime minister.

== Education & Teaching ==
- Graduated from Rawalpindi Medical University in 1988.
- Master's in Public Health in Developing Countries from the London School of Hygiene & Tropical Medicine in 1995.
- Taught at the Boston School of Public Health.
- Co-created and delivered courses on UHC and Health Systems Strengthening with WHO at Harvard School of Medicine.
- Brittania Scholar (1995–96)
- Eisenhower Fellow (2004)

== Publications ==
Mirza has authored and co-authored over a hundred national and international papers and publications. Selected works include:

- Mirza, Zafar. "COVID-19 response: a perspective from Pakistan." International Journal for Quality in Health Care, Volume 35, Issue 2, 2023.
- Mirza, Zafar, and Munir, D. "Conflicting interests, institutional fragmentation and opportunity structures: an analysis of political institutions and the health taxes regime in Pakistan." BMJ Global Health, 2023.
- Mirza, Zafar, et al. "Promote Health, Keep the World Safe, Serve the Vulnerable." East Mediterranean Region, 2018.
- Mirza, Zafar. "Sustainable Development Agenda 2030 thrives on health." 2016.
- Mirza, Zafar, and Rahman, A. "Mental health care in Pakistan boosted by the highest office." The Lancet, 2019.
- WHO, WTO. "WTO agreements and public health." 2002.
- WHO, WIPO, WTO. "Promoting Access to Medical Technologies and Innovation – Intersections between Public Health, Intellectual Property and Trade." 2012.
- Siddiqi, S., Mataria, A., Rouleau, K., Iqbal, M. "Making Health Systems Work in Low and Middle Income Countries." Cambridge University Press, 2022.
- Ranson, M. Kent, Beaglehole, R., Correa, C. M., Mirza, Zafar, Buse, K., Drager, N. "Health Policy in a Globalizing World." Cambridge University Press, 2002.
- Covey, Stephen R. "Seven Habits of Highly Effective People," translated by Zafar Mirza. 2002.
- Mirza, Zafar. Regular op-ed articles in Dawn
