= Corona Relief Tiger Force =

Defunct Pakistani volunteer organization

Pakistan's Corona Relief Tiger Force
- پاکستان کرونا ریلیف ٹائگر فورس
- Formation: 29 March 2020; 6 years ago
- Dissolved: 10 April 2022; 4 years ago
- Type: Volunteer Force
- Purpose: Assisting Health Facilities in Corona-Affected Areas of Pakistan
- Headquarters: Islamabad, Pakistan
- Website: Tiger Force Website
- Urdu: کرونا سے پاک پاکستان; English: Pakistan Free from Corona

Pakistan Corona Relief Tiger Force was a volunteer task force aimed at providing health facilities in areas affected by the pandemic in Pakistan. Initiated by Pakistan's Prime Minister, Mr. Imran Khan, the force was established due to the shortage of staff in existing institutions, despite Pakistan's population being more than 60% youth who could contribute significantly.

The force was announced by Prime Minister Imran Khan on 27 March 2020, a month after Pakistan confirmed its first coronavirus case. Registration opened on 31 March 2020 through the Pakistan Citizens Portal and continued until 10 April 2020. Within two days of opening, the portal received applications from 90,000 volunteers, with the registration website recording 400,000 visitors in its first 50 minutes of launch. By early April, registrations had risen to over 739,000, and by later that year the number of registered volunteers exceeded one million, including 662,977 men, 19,178 women, and 534 individuals identifying as other genders.

Beginning its operations in Islamabad, the task force expanded its role as the spread of COVID-19 increased across other cities in Pakistan. Volunteers played a crucial role in supporting district administrations by implementing coronavirus standard operating procedures, such as social distancing measures in mosques and public spaces. Additionally, they distributed food and essential supplies to impoverished communities and ensured compliance with 'smart lockdowns' in coronavirus hotspots.

Of the volunteers who registered, approximately 17,000 had backgrounds directly or indirectly related to health services, including around 1,800 doctors, nurses, and other paramedical staff.

Muhammad Usman Dar was appointed to oversee the governance of the task force. Beyond COVID-19-related tasks, volunteers assisted with registrations at the Ehsaas Web Portal, a government social welfare program, and monitored utility stores for hoarding and social distancing compliance. By mid-2020, the force's scope had expanded beyond pandemic relief to include participation in other government initiatives, such as a national tree plantation drive and waste management projects.

The initiative received international media coverage, including a detailed feature in the United Kingdom's The Daily Telegraph, which described Pakistan's approach as an effort to mobilize its large youth population to compensate for an underfunded health system.

The Corona Relief Tiger Force faced criticism from journalists and opposition politicians. Some opposition figures accused the ruling Pakistan Tehreek-e-Insaf party of leveraging the country's youth population for political gain, particularly after the force's role was expanded beyond pandemic relief into unrelated government projects. Journalists also questioned the initiative's overall effectiveness in achieving its stated goals.
