= List of Nishan-e-Imtiaz recipients =

List of recipients of Pakistan's highest civilians award

This is list of recipients of the Nishan-e-Imtiaz, listed in chronological order. The Nishan-e-Imtiaz (Urdu: نشان امتیاز; transl. Order of Excellence) is one of the state organized civil decorations of Islamic Republic of Pakistan.

It is awarded for achievements towards world recognition for Pakistan or outstanding service for the country. However, the award is not limited to citizens of Pakistan and, while it is a civilian award, it can also be awarded to military personnel and worn on the uniform. Nishan, translates as Decoration/Order, is a highly restricted and prestigious award roughly equivalent to Presidential Medal of Freedom (United States) and Order of the British Empire (United Kingdom), and is the first category award of Order of Imtiaz. The other three descending categories are Hilal-i-Imtiaz, Sitara-i-Imtiaz and Tamgha-e-Imtiaz. Usually, it is regarded as the highest award one can achieve in Pakistan since the higher award Nishan-e-Pakistan is awarded only to foreign Heads of States.

== List ==
Image	Name of the recipient	Field of recognition	Year	Country (Note: Citizenship at the time of awarding)	Ref
	Muhammad Tantawi	Defense	1950	Egypt	
	Abdul Ghafoor	Theology	1958	Pakistan	
	Aga Khan IV	Philanthropy	1970	Switzerland	
	Ratna Rajya Lakshmi Devi	Philanthropy	1970	Nepal	
	Abdus Salam	Science, theoretical	1979	Pakistan	
	Abdul Sattar Edhi	Philanthropy	1989	Pakistan	
	Faiz Ahmed Faiz	Literature, Urdu	1990	Pakistan	
	Abdul Waheed Kakar	Defense	1993	Pakistan	
	Rudini	Defense		Indonesia	
	Try Sutrisno	Defense		Indonesia	
	Feisal Tanjung	Defense	1995	Indonesia	
	Hartono	Defense		Indonesia	
	Abdul Qadeer Khan	Science, materials	1996	Pakistan	
	Ishfaq Ahmad	Science, nuclear	1998	Pakistan	
	Dilip Kumar	Fine arts	1998	India	
	Riazuddin	Science, theoretical	1998	Pakistan	
	Sharifuddin Pirzada	Law	1998	Pakistan	
	Raziuddin Siddiqui	Science, theoretical	1998	Pakistan	
	Abdul Qadeer Khan	Science, nuclear	1999	Pakistan	
	Akhtar Hameed Khan	Economics	2001	Pakistan	
	Shahid Karimullah	Defense	2002	Pakistan	
Begum Shaista Suhrawardy	Shaista Suhrawardy Ikramullah	social work	2002	Bengal	
	Atta ur Rahman	Science, organic	2002	Pakistan	
	Hakim Said	Philanthropy	2002	Pakistan	
	Samar Mubarakmand	Science, nuclear	2004	Pakistan	
	Yaşar Büyükanıt	Defense	2007	Turkey	
	Habib Jalib	Literature, Urdu	2009	Pakistan	
	Haji Mohammed Adeel	Diplomacy	2011	Pakistan	
	Khurshid Ahmad	Economics	2011	Pakistan	
	Mehdi Hassan	Fine arts	2012	Pakistan	
	Saadat Hassan Manto	Literature, Urdu	2012	Pakistan	
	Abdul Sattar Edhi	Philanthropy	2012	Pakistan	
	Munir Ahmad Khan	Science, nuclear	2012	Pakistan	
	Rahimuddin Khan	Defense		Pakistan	
	Rashad Mahmood	Defense	2013	Pakistan	
	General Tariq Majid	Defense	2013	Pakistan	
	Hilmi Özkök	Defense	2013	Turkey	
	Shafi ur Rahman	Law	2013	Pakistan	
	Sherry Rehman	Diplomacy	2013	Pakistan	
	Anwar Shamim	Defense	2013	Pakistan	
	Raheel Sharif	Defense	2013	Pakistan	
	Ghulam Nabi	Science, shock physics (detonics)	2014	Pakistan	
	Marsetio	Defense	2014	Indonesia	
	Asma Jahangir	Women's rights	2018	Pakistan	
	Admiral Ravindra C. Wijegunaratne	Defense	2019	Sri Lanka	
	Sadruddin Hashwani	Philanthropy	2019	Pakistan	
	Ghulam Mustafa Tabassum	Poetry	2023	Pakistan	
	Jansher Khan	Sports, Squash	2023	Pakistan	
	Qavi Khan	Fine arts	2023	Pakistan	
	Iftikhar Arif	Literature	2023	Pakistan	
	Mujahid Anwar Khan	Defense	2023	Pakistan	
	Nadeem Raza	Defense	2023	Pakistan	
	Shamshad Akhtar	Economics	2024	Pakistan	
	Metin Gürak	Defense	2024	Türkiye	
	Michael Kurilla	Defense	2025	United States of America	
