= Awaam Pakistan =

Political party in Pakistan

Awaam Pakistan عوام پاکستان/ عوام پاکستان پارٹی
- Abbreviation: AP
- President: Shahid Khaqan Abbasi
- Secretary-General: Miftah Ismail
- Founders: Shahid Khaqan Abbasi; Miftah Ismail
- Founded: July 6, 2024; 2 years ago
- Split from: PMLN
- National affiliation: TTAP
- Colors: Blue, Green
- Slogan: بدلیں گے نظام (lit. 'We will change the system')

Election symbol
- Clock

Party flag

Website
- www.awaampakistan.org

The Awaam Pakistan (Urdu: عوام پاکستان, Sindhi: عوام پاڪستان, lit. 'People of Pakistan', abbr. AP) is a political party in Pakistan that was established in 2024 by former Prime Minister Shahid Khaqan Abbasi and former Minister of Finance Miftah Ismail, both of whom had left the Pakistan Muslim League (N) (PML-N) It was registered with the Election Commission of Pakistan (ECP) on 9 January 2025.

The formal launching ceremony of the party was held on 6 July 2024 in Islamabad, Rawalpindi, Lahore, and Karachi.

== History ==
On 3 January 2023, Maryam Nawaz, daughter of Pakistan Muslim League (N) (PML-N) leader Nawaz Sharif, was appointed as senior vice president of the PML-N, making her one of the PML-N's senior-most leaders. Numerous senior leaders within PML-N expressed regret and displeasure over the lack of consultation preceding Maryam's appointment, which positioned her as the second most senior figure in the party, following her leaving uncle Shehbaz Sharif. Within an hour of the announcement of Maryam's promotion, Shahid Khaqan Abbasi, former Prime Minister and a leader of PML-N, resigned as senior vice president of PML-N, saying "Maryam needs space, if we are there, there will be disagreement, which is not suitable for anyone." He later quit PML-N in December 2023. In an interview, Abbasi said his "stature in the PML-N is equal to that of Shehbaz Sharif and working under Maryam is not acceptable to him at all. He takes it as his insult." Another leader of PML-N, Miftah Ismail, also announced he would quit PML-N following his removal from his position as Federal Minister of Finance.

The party was founded in June 2024 by Shahid Khaqan Abbasi, the former Prime Minister of Pakistan, and Miftah Ismail, the former Minister of Finance. Prior to forming AP, Abbasi was a senior leader of the PML-N. He had left his former party on 16 December 2023, later citing his endorsement of the ووٹ کو عزت دو (lit. 'Honour the vote') narrative, which he claimed the PML-N had abandoned after Nawaz Sharif had returned from self-imposed exile. Ismail had left the PML-N on 25 June 2023, saying he was "not interested in active politics anymore".

Later developments towards the creation of a new political party came in the form of the "Reimagining Pakistan" seminars, organized by Miftah Ismail and Shahid Khaqan Abbasi, in various cities across Pakistan. The seminars also included figures like Mustafa Nawaz Khokhar, previously associated with the Pakistan People's Party; he did not, however, join Awaam Pakistan, owing to disagreements concerning the party's launch date and its conflict with the Islamabad High Court's ruling concerning the results of Khokhar's electoral constituency in NA-47.

On 21 June 2024, after months of speculation, a video was posted on the Twitter account of Awaam Pakistan, which featured a series of people asking questions about multiple national issues. The video featured the tagline 'عوام پاکستان: بدلیں گے نظام' (lit. 'People of Pakistan: We will change the system').

On 6 July 2024, the party's formal launching ceremony was held in Islamabad. It was also announced that Abbasi had been elected as the convener of the party while Ismail was elected as the secretary during intra-party elections on 19 June. The ceremony was also attended by Mehtab Abbasi, Zaeem Qadri, Sheikh Salahuddin (Karachi politician) and Zafar Mirza. They also announced that a formal outline of the party's goals and policies would be published in the coming weeks.

== Ideology ==
During the formal launching ceremony on 6 July 2024, Abbasi was asked of AP's ideology. He answered that the "concept of left and right has died in Pakistan" and that their ideology would be "helping the people of Pakistan and taking responsibility for them".

In an interview with Arab News, Ismail commented on the economic policy of the party, stating the need to "extend tax concessions to middle-income and salaried classes, focus on privatization, limit the government's footprint by encouraging the private sector and privatize the public organizations".

== See also ==
- Shahid Khaqan Abbasi
- Miftah Ismail
- Politics of Pakistan
- List of Islamic political parties
- List of political parties in Pakistan
- List of student federations in Pakistan
- Zafar Mirza
- Sheikh Salahuddin (Karachi politician)
