= Miftah Ismail =

Pakistani politician and economist

- مفتاح اسماعیل
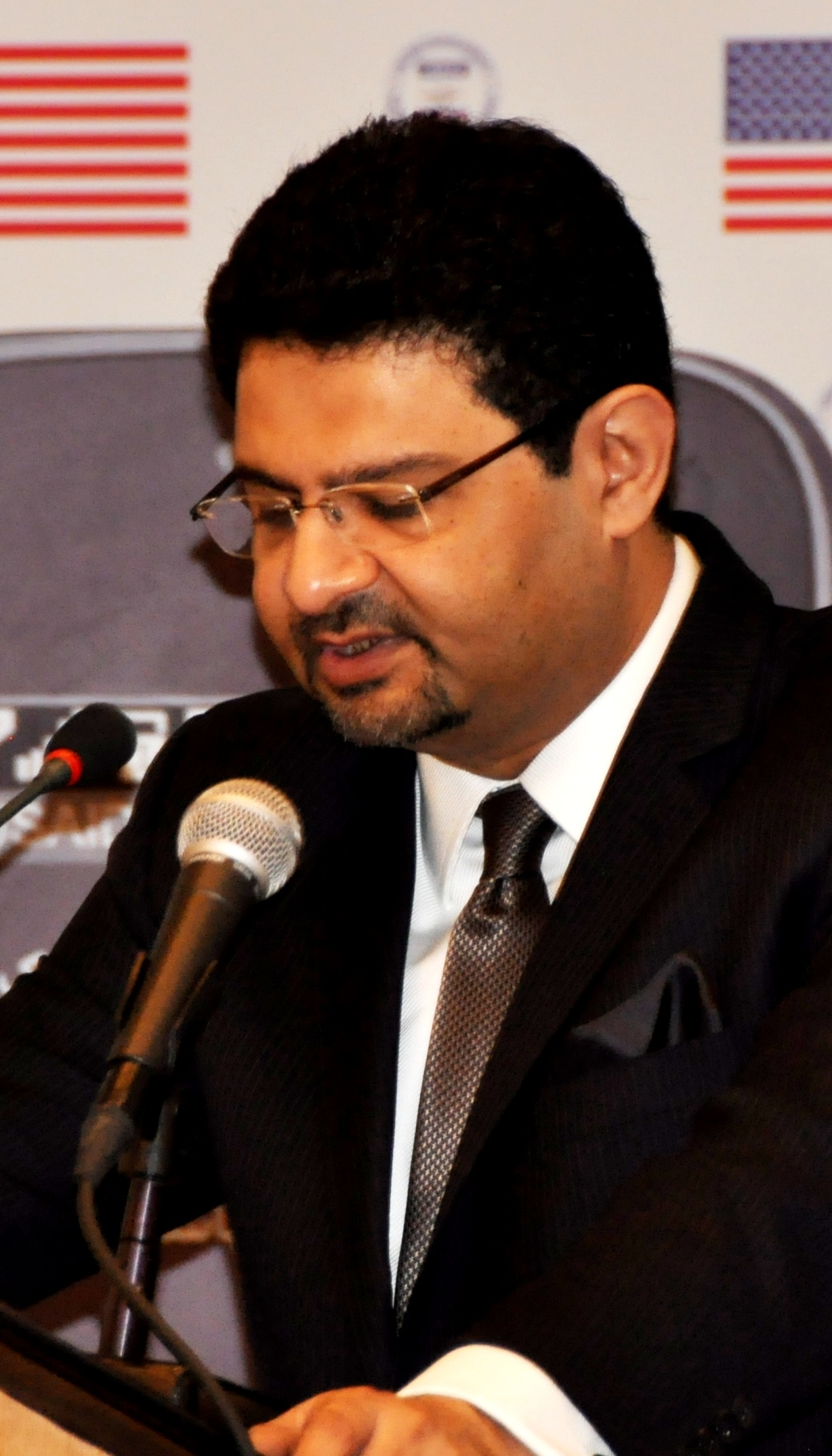
- Ismail in 2014

Secretary-General of Awaam Pakistan
- Incumbent
- Assumed office 6 July 2024
- Leader: Shahid Khaqan Abbasi

Finance, Revenue and Economic Affairs Minister of Pakistan
- In office 19 April 2022 – 27 September 2022
- President: Arif Alvi
- Prime Minister: Shehbaz Sharif
- Preceded by: Shaukat Tarin
- Succeeded by: Ishaq Dar
- In office 27 April 2018 – 31 May 2018
- President: Mamnoon Hussain
- Prime Minister: Shahid Khaqan Abbasi
- Preceded by: Himself (Adviser)
- Succeeded by: Shamshad Akhtar (Caretaker)

Adviser to the Prime Minister for Finance (Federal Minister)
- In office 27 December 2017 – 27 April 2018
- President: Mamnoon Hussain
- Prime Minister: Shahid Khaqan Abbasi
- Preceded by: Ishaq Dar
- Succeeded by: Himself (Federal Minister)

Special Assistant to the Prime Minister on Investment (Minister of State)
- In office 4 January 2014 – 27 December 2017
- President: Mamnoon Hussain
- Prime Minister: Nawaz Sharif; Shahid Khaqan Abbasi

Personal details
- Born: 23 July 1965 (age 61) Karachi, Sindh, Pakistan
- Party: AP (2024-present)
- Other political affiliations: PMLN (2011-2023)
- Education: Duquesne University (B.S); Wharton School of the University of Pennsylvania (Ph.D)

Miftah Ismail (Urdu: مفتاح اسماعیل; born 23 July 1964) is a Pakistani political economist who served as the Federal Minister of Finance from April 2022 to September 2022. He had previously served in the same office, from April 2018 to May 2018 in Khaqan Abbasi's cabinet. Prior to that, he served as the Advisor to the Prime Minister on Finance, Revenue and Economic Affairs, chairman of the Pakistan Board of Investment and an economist with the International Monetary Fund.

He is the current secretary of the Awaam Pakistan party, a political party he co-founded alongside former Pakistani prime minister Shahid Khaqan Abbasi.

== Early life and education ==
He was born on 23 July 1965 in Karachi, Sindh to a Memon family. Ismail received his undergraduate degree in business from Duquesne University in 1985, followed by a Ph.D. in public finance and political economy from the Wharton School, University of Pennsylvania in 1990.

== Professional career ==
Ismail began his career as an economist with the International Monetary Fund in Washington, D.C., in the early 1990s. In 1993, he returned to Pakistan to manage his family's business, Ismail Industries Limited, a confectionery and snack food manufacturer, and was CEO and executive director from 1993 to 2015.

Between 2012 and 2022, he held leadership roles in public-sector firms:

- Vice Chairman, Punjab Board of Investment & Trade (2012–2013)
- Director, Pakistan International Airlines (2013–2014)
- Chairman, Sui Southern Gas Company (2016–2022)

== Academic career ==
Ismail has been adjunct faculty at the Institute of Business Administration, Karachi and chairman of board at Karachi American School.

== Political career ==
=== Pakistan Muslim League (N) (2011–2023) ===
Ismail joined the Pakistan Muslim League (N) (PML-N)in 2011.

During the 2013 Pakistani general election, Ismail was a member of the election strategy team and the manifesto committee of the PML-N.

In January 2014, he was appointed the head of Federal Board of Investment and was added as a junior member of then Prime Minister Sharif's cabinet. Under his leadership the Board of Investment underwent massive restructuring including winding up of its regional offices. During his tenure, he oversaw significant restructuring and played a key role in formulating new auto sector investment policy.

In December 2017, Miftah was appointed a finance adviser to then-Prime Minister Shahid Khaqan Abbasi. In April 2018, Ismail took oath as Federal Minister for Finance, Revenue and Economic Affairs in Shahid Khaqan Abbasi's cabinet, where he served until 31 May 2018.

In April 2022, Ismail was reappointed finance minister but resigned in September of the same year, paving the way for the return of Ishaq Dar.

In June 2023, he was removed by PML-N as the general secretary of the party, allegedly due to his criticism of Dar's economic policies and dislike by then Chief Organizer of the PML-N, Maryam Nawaz. Later, in the same month, he resigned from all positions and committees of the PML-N.

=== Awaam Pakistan (2024–present) ===
In June 2024, Ismail along with former Prime Minister Shahid Khaqan Abbasi announced the formation of a new political party named Awaam Pakistan (“People of Pakistan”), introducing it with the slogan “Badlenge Nizam” (“We will change the system”). Dr. Ismail was appointed the Deputy Convener alongside Abbasi, who served as Convenor of the Organizing Committee.

The party was formally registered with the Election Commission of Pakistan in January 2025.

In media interviews, Ismail stated that the party’s mission was rooted in populist economic reform: advocating “equal economic opportunities,” reducing government size, and empowering the middle class.

== Other activities ==
- Asian Infrastructure Investment Bank (AIIB), Ex-Officio Member of the Board of Governors (since 2017)
- World Bank, Ex-Officio Member of the Board of Governors (since 2017).

== Writings ==
Ismail is a regular economic commentator, writing in both English and Urdu.
