= National Institute of Virology (Pakistan) =

Pakistani research institute

The National Institute of Virology (NIV) in Pakistan is a national research institute concentrating on biosafety. It has a national laboratory site dedicated to identification and eradication of Emerging infectious diseases, as well as efforts in biological warfare. The aforementioned is a BSL3 laboratory managed by the University of Karachi for the Ministry of Health. Karachi University's International Center for Chemical and Biological Sciences established the National Institute of Virology on September 19, 2019.

The NIV assumed greater importance during the COVID-19 pandemic outbreak in Pakistan, a disease caused by the SARS-CoV-2 virus. It developed its own COVID-19 testing kits, which can be produced at drastically lower costs than imported kits, allowing a greater number of citizens to get tested. When the outbreak took place in Pakistan, the state government of Sindh worked beside Pakistan's federal government's Ministry of Health to develop vaccines and medications for the treatment of infectious diseases.

In addition to test kit development, the NIV's BSL-3 facility supported genomic surveillance of SARS-CoV-2 in Pakistan. Researchers affiliated with the institute used the facility to sequence and analyze locally transmitted strains of the virus, contributing to the tracking of viral genomic diversity within the country during the pandemic.
