= Defence View =

Neighborhood in Karachi, Sindh, Pakistan

Coordinates: 24°53′N 67°02′E

Defence View (Urdu: ڈیفنس ویو) is a neighborhood of Jamshed Town in Karachi, Sindh, Pakistan that is very near to Defence Housing Authority.

There are several ethnic groups including Hazaras, Muhajirs, Punjabis, Sindhis, Kashmiris, Seraikis, Pakhtuns, Balochis, Memons, Bohras, Ismailis, etc. Over 99% of the population is Muslim.

Iqra University's main campus is located in Defence View. Royal Grammar School is the oldest school in Phase 2 area. The Defence View Graveyard is a major cemetery in the area. Because of existence in the centre of the city, starting point of Malir Expressway and nearby well known commercial projects and shopping malls, the area value has increased significantly as it has all living amenities available at affordable rates.

== See also ==
- Jamshed Town
- Azam Basti
- Central Jacob Lines
- Chanesar Goth
- Akhtar Colony
- Garden East
- Garden West
- Jamshed Quarters
- Jut Line
- Firozabad
- Mahmudabad
- Manzoor Colony
- Nursery
- Pakistan Quarters
- P.E.C.H.S. (Pakistan Employees Co-operative Housing Society)
- P.E.C.H.S. II (Pakistan Employees Co-operative Housing Society)
- Soldier Bazar
- Baloch Colony
