= Akhtar Colony =

Residential neighborhood locality of Karachi, Pakistan

Coordinates: 24°53′N 67°02′E

Akthar Colony اختر کالونی
- Neighbourhood
- Interactive map of Akthar Colony اختر کالونی
- Country: Pakistan
- District: Karachi East District
- City: Karachi
- Time zone: UTC+5 (PST)
- Postal code: 75300

Akhtar Colony (Urdu: اختر کالونی) is a neighborhood in Karachi East District in Karachi, Pakistan. It was previously administered as part of Jamshed Town. It was named after Akhter Paganwala.

There are several ethnic groups in Akhtar Colony and they include: Muhajirs, Punjabis, Sindhis, Kashmiris, Seraikis, Pakhtuns, Balochies, Hazarwal. The population of Akhtar Colony is estimated to be nearly 100,000. Over 70% of the population is Muslim with Christians.

In Akhtar Colony, there are five sectors A, B, C, D & E.

Local leaders / administrators of Union administration of Akhtar Colony.

** Nazim / Chairman

Malik Akhter Supro - 2001~2005

Zahoor Jadoon - 2005~2010

Nadeem Akhter Arian - 2015~2020

Hamid Hussain - 2023 till present

** Naib Nazim / Vice Chairman

Nadeem Akhter Arain - 2001~2005

Anthony Naveed - 2005~2010

Bimla Rose Mary - 2015~2020

Ayub Sabir - 2023 tll present

- Jamshed Town
- Azam Basti
- Central Jacob Lines
- Chanesar Goth
- Defence View
- Garden East
- Garden West
- Jamshed Quarters
- Jut Line
- Firozabad
- Mehmoodabad
- Manzoor Colony
- Nursery, Karachi
- Pakistan Quarters
- P.E.C.H.S. (Public Employees Co-operative Housing Society)
- P.E.C.H.S. II (Public Employees Co-operative Housing Society)
- Soldier Bazar
- Baloch Colony
