= Mahmudabad, Karachi =

Residential neighbourhood in Karachi, Pakistan

Mahmudabad محمود آباد
- Neighbourhood
- Country: Pakistan
- City: Karachi
- District: Karachi East
- Time zone: UTC+5 (PST)
- Postal code: 75300

Mehmoodabad or Mahmudabad (Urdu: محمود آباد) is a residential neighborhood in Karachi East district of Karachi, Pakistan. It is administered as part of Jamshed Town.

== See also ==
- Akhtar Colony
- Azam Basti
- Central Jacob Lines
- Chanesar Goth
- Defence View
- Garden East
- Garden West
- Jamshed Quarters
- Jut Line
- Jamshed Town
- Manzoor Colony
- Nursery
- P.E.C.H.S. (Pakistan Employees Co-operative Housing Society)
- P.E.C.H.S. II
- Soldier Bazaar
