= NA-237 Karachi East-III =

Constituency of the National Assembly of Pakistan

- Constituency for the National Assembly of Pakistan
- Region: Firozabad Town (partly) and Mazar-e-Quaid of Karachi East District in Karachi
- Electorate: 413,942

Current constituency
- Party: Pakistan People's Party
- Member: Asad Alam Niazi
- Created from: NA-251 Karachi-XIII

NA-237 Karachi East-III (این اے-237، کراچی مشرقی-۳) is a constituency for the National Assembly of Pakistan.

== Area ==
The constituency primarily consists of Faisal Cantonment, Defence View, Kashmir Colony, Akhtar Colony, Manzoor Colony, Azam Basti, Chanesar Goth, Mehmoodabad, Baloch Colony, Dhoraji Colony, Ferozabad, Hill Park, Muhammad Ali Society, Naval Colony, Karsaz, KDA Scheme, Gulistan-e-Johar and Pehlwan Goth.

== Assembly Segments ==
Constituency number	Constituency	District	Current MPA	Party
103	PS-103 Karachi East-VII	Karachi East	Faisal Rafiq	MQM-P
104	PS-104 Karachi East-VIII	Karachi East	Muhammad Daniyal	MQM-P
105	PS-105 Karachi East-IX	Karachi East	Saeed Ghani	PPP

== Members of Parliament ==
=== 2018–2023: NA-244 Karachi East-III ===
Election	Member	Party
2018	Ali Haider Zaidi	PTI

=== 2024–present: NA-237 Karachi East-III ===
Election	Member	Party
2024	Asad Alam Niazi	PPP

== Election 2002 ==
General elections were held on 10 October 2002. Syeed Safwanullah of Muttahida Qaumi Movement won by 23,856 votes.

General election 2002: NA-251 Karachi-XIII
Party	Candidate	Votes	%	±%
MQM	Syeed Sanwan Ullah	23,856	30.70	
MMA	Abdul Ghaffar Umer Kapadia	22,045	28.37	
PML(N)	Mushahid Ullah Khan	8,615	11.09	
PPP	Qaiser Khan Nizamani	8,347	10.74	
PML(Q)	Sultan Ahmed Chawlla	4,148	5.34	
PST	Muhammad Shahzad Muneer Qadri	3,699	4.76	
MQM-H	Mehboob Ali Rajput	2,399	3.09	
Others	Others (fifteen candidates)	4,610	5.91	
Turnout		77,838	36.98	
Total valid votes		77,719	99.85	
Rejected ballots		119	0.15	
Majority		1,811	2.33	
Registered electors		210,491		

== Election 2008 ==
General elections were held on 18 February 2008. Waseem Akhtar of Muttahida Qaumi Movement won by 83,537 votes.

General election 2008: NA-251 Karachi-XIII
Party	Candidate	Votes	%	±%
MQM	Waseem Akhtar	83,537	63.76	
PML(N)	Mushahid Ullah Khan	22,304	17.02	
PPP	Ch. Umar Hayat Sandhu	17,823	13.60	
Independent	Irfanullah Khan Marwat	6,653	5.08	
Others	Others (three candidates)	707	0.54	
Turnout		133,697	39.65	
Total valid votes		131,024	98.00	
Rejected ballots		2,673	2.00	
Majority		61,233	46.74	
Registered electors		337,193		
MQM hold				

== Election 2013 ==
General elections were held on 11 May 2013. Syed Ali Raza Abidi of Muttahida Qaumi Movement won by 81,603 votes and became the member of National Assembly.

General election 2013: NA-251 Karachi-XIII
Party	Candidate	Votes	%	±%
MQM	Syed Ali Raza Abidi	81,603	47.61	
PTI	Raja Azhar Khan	40,388	23.57	
JI	Zahid Saeed	27,166	15.85	
PML(N)	Syed Muhammad Nihal Hashmi	13,223	7.72	
PPP	Zulfiqar Ali Qaim Khani	6,637	3.87	
Others	Others (twelve candidates)	2,368	1.38	
Turnout		173,638	50.75	
Total valid votes		171,385	98.70	
Rejected ballots		2,253	1.30	
Majority		41,215	24.04	
Registered electors		342,155		
MQM hold				

== Election 2018 ==
General elections were held on 25 July 2018.

General election 2018: NA-244 Karachi East-III
Party	Candidate	Votes	%	±%
PTI	Ali Haider Zaidi	69,475	40.70	
PML(N)	Miftah Ismail	31,247	18.30	
MQM-P	Rauf Siddiqui	19,527	11.44	
MMA	Zahid Saeed	17,894	10.48	
PPP	Mian Waqar Akhtar Paganwala	14,745	8.64	
TLP	Yashaullah Khan Afghan	9,273	5.43	
Others	Others (fifteen candidates)	5,834	3.42	
Turnout		170,711	41.91	
Rejected ballots		2,716	1.59	
Majority		38,228	22.40	
Registered electors		407,363		
PTI gain from MQM-P				

== Election 2024 ==
General elections were held on 8 February 2024. Asad Alam Niazi won the election with 40,840 votes.

General election 2024: NA-237 Karachi East-III
Party	Candidate	Votes	%	±%
PPP	Asad Alam Niazi	40,840	28.22	▲19.58
PTI	Zahoor Uddin (Note: Filed nomination papers as PTI candidate but ECP allowed him to run as an Independent)	33,322	23.03	▼17.67
JI	Irfan Ahmed	22,257	15.38	N/A
MQM-P	Rauf Siddiqui	15,412	10.65	▼0.79
TLP	Muhammad Shahid	8,826	6.10	▼0.67
PML(N)	Rehan Qaiser	8,188	5.66	▼12.64
Others	Others (Thirty candidates)	15,870	10.97	
Turnout		147,617	35.66	▼6.25
Total valid votes		144,715	98.03	
Rejected ballots		2,902	1.97	
Majority		7,518	5.20	
Registered electors		413,952		
PPP gain from JI				

== See also ==
- NA-236 Karachi East-II
- NA-238 Karachi East-IV
