= Garden, Karachi =

Garden گارڈ ن
- Neighbourhood
- Country: Pakistan
- City: Karachi
- District: Karachi South
- Time zone: UTC+5 (PST)
- Postal code: 75300

Garden (Urdu: گارڈ ن) is an upmarket neighbourhood, which is in the Karachi South district of Karachi, Pakistan. It is subdivided into two neighborhoods: Garden East and Garden West. It is the residential area around the Karachi Zoological Gardens, hence it is popularly known as 'Garden' area. Garden East is home to a house of worship for Baháʼís. It is also location of the Cincinnatus Town neighborhood which was established by Goan Catholics. The main Karimabad Jamaat Khana is the largest Ismai'li house of worship in the world.

The population of Garden used to be primarily Ismaili and Goan Catholic, but has seen increasing numbers of Memons, Pashtuns, and Baloch.

Garden area is divided into:

- Garden East
- Garden West

Other areas of Garden are:

- Usmanabad
- Badshahi Compound
- Hasan Lashkari Village
- Dhobi Ghat
- Shoe Market area
- Pakistan Quarters
