= NA-238 Karachi East-IV =

Constituency of the National Assembly of Pakistan

- Constituency for the National Assembly of Pakistan
- Region: Jamshed Town, Firozabad Town (partly), Gulshan-e-Iqbal Town (partly) and Karachi Cantonment (partly) of Karachi East District in Karachi
- Electorate: 561,283

Current constituency
- Created: 2018
- Party: MQM-P
- Member: Sadiq Iftikhar
- Created from: NA-252 Karachi-XIV

NA-238 Karachi East-IV (این اے-238، کراچی مشرقی-4) is a newly created a constituency for the National Assembly of Pakistan. It mainly comprises the areas of Jamshed Quarters Subdivision, and Firozabad Subdivision that were previously in the western portion of the old NA-252.

== Assembly Segments ==
Constituency number	Constituency	District	Current MPA	Party
101	PS-101 Karachi East-V	Karachi East	Moeed Anwar	MQM-P
102	PS-102 Karachi East-VI	Karachi East	Muhammad Aamir Siddiqui	MQM-P

== Members of Parliament ==
=== 2018–2023: NA-245 Karachi East-IV ===
Election	Member	Party
2018-2022	Aamir Liaquat Hussain	PTI
2022	Mahmood Moulvi	PTI

=== 2024–present: NA-238 Karachi East-IV ===
Election	Member	Party
2024	Sadiq Iftikhar	MQM–P

== Election 2018 ==
General elections were held on 25 July 2018.

General election 2018: NA-245 Karachi East-IV
Party	Candidate	Votes	%	±%
PTI	Aamir Liaquat Hussain	56,664	33.96	
MQM-P	Farooq Sattar	35,429	21.23	
TLP	Allama Muhammad Ahmed Raza Amjadi	20,733	12.42	
MMA	Saifuddin	20,142	12.07	
PML(N)	Khawaja Tariq Nazir	9,681	5.80	
PPP	Farrukh Niaz Tanoli	8,822	5.29	
PSP	Sagheer Ahmad	6,222	3.73	
Others	Others (eight candidates)	6,294	3.77	
Turnout		166,868	37.62	
Rejected ballots		2,881	1.73	
Majority		21,235	12.73	
Registered electors		443,540		
PTI gain from MQM-P				

== By-election 2022 ==
A by-election was held on 21 August 2022 due to the death of Aamir Liaquat Hussain, the former MNA from this seat.

By-election 2022: NA-245 Karachi East-IV
Party	Candidate	Votes	%	±%
PTI	Mahmood Moulvi	29,475	48.85	▲14.89
MQM-P	Moeed Anwar	13,193	21.87	▲0.64
TLP	Ahmed Raza Amjadi	9,836	16.30	▲3.88
Independent	Farooq Sattar	3,479	5.77	
PSP	Syed Hafeezuddin	1,177	1.95	▼1.78
Others	Others (twelve candidates)	3,576	5.93	
Turnout		60,740	11.79	▼25.83
Total valid votes		60,336	99.33	▲1.06
Rejected ballots		404	0.67	▼1.06
Majority		16,282	26.99	▲14.26
Registered electors		515,003		
PTI hold		Swing	N/A	

== Election 2024 ==
General elections were held on 8 February 2024. Sadiq Iftikhar won the election with 54,885 votes.

General election 2024: NA-238 Karachi East-IV
Party	Candidate	Votes	%	±%
MQM-P	Sadiq Iftikhar	54,885	32.67	▲10.80
PTI	Haleem Adil Sheikh (Note: Filed nomination papers as PTI candidate but ECP allowed him to run as an Independent)	36,885	21.95	▼26.90
JI	Saif Uddin	36,281	21.60	N/A
TLP	Muhammad Waseem	10,594	6.31	▼9.99
PPP	Pir Omer Uddin Zafar	10,464	6.23	▲5.68
Others	Others (Twenty one candidates)	18,896	11.25	
Turnout		171,146	30.49	▲18.70
Total valid votes		168,005	98.16	
Rejected ballots		3,141	1.84	
Majority		18,000	10.71	
Registered electors		561,283		
MQM-P gain from PTI				

== See also ==
- NA-237 Karachi East-III
- NA-239 Karachi South-I
