= NA-236 Karachi East-II =

Constituency of the National Assembly of Pakistan

- Constituency for the National Assembly of Pakistan
- Region: Gulshan-e-Iqbal Town (partly) and Faisal Cantonment (partly) of Karachi East District in Karachi
- Electorate: 542,409

Current constituency
- Created: 2018
- Party: MQM-P
- Member: Hassaan Sabir
- Created from: NA-252 Karachi-XIV; NA-253 Karachi-XV

NA-236 Karachi East-II (این اے-236، کراچی مشرقی-٢) is a newly-created constituency for the National Assembly of Pakistan, created during the 2018 delimitation. It primarily covers the Gulshan-e-Iqbal Subdivision and census charges 12 and 13 of Jamshed Quarters. This constituency was formed from parts of the former NA-252 (Karachi-XIV), along with the section of Gulshan-e-Iqbal included in NA-253.

== Area ==
This constituency consists of Mohammad Ali Society, Dhoraji, Pir Ilahi Buksh Colony, PECHS-II, Bahadurabad, Eissa Nagri, Gulshan-e-Iqbal, Patel Para, Gulistan-e-Jauhar, Sharafabad and East Garden areas of Karachi East District.

== Assembly Segments ==
Constituency number	Constituency	District	Current MPA	Party
99	PS-99 Karachi East-III	Karachi East	Syed Farhan Ansari	MQM-P
100	PS-100 Karachi East-IV	Karachi East	Syed Muhammad Usman	MQM-P

== Members of Parliament ==
=== 2018–2023: NA-243 Karachi East-II ===
Election	Member	Party
2018	Imran Khan	PTI
By-election 2018	Alamgir Khan	PTI

=== 2024–present: NA-236 Karachi East-II ===
Election	Member	Party
2024	Hassaan Sabir	MQM–P

== Election 2018 ==
General elections were held on 25 July 2018. Chairman Pakistan Tehreek-e-Insaf, Imran Khan won the election but vacated this constituency and three others in favor of NA-95 (Mianwali-I).

General election 2018: NA-243 Karachi East-II
Party	Candidate	Votes	%	±%
PTI	Imran Khan	91,373	56.05	
MQM-P	Syed Ali Raza Abidi	24,082	14.77	
MMA	Muhammad Osama Razi Khan	16,214	9.95	
PPP	Shehla Raza	10,633	6.52	
PML(N)	Sheikh Muhammad Shah Jahan	7,912	4.85	
TLP	Syed Nawazul Huda	6,489	3.98	
Others	Others (nine candidates)	6,332	3.88	
Turnout		165,298	41.14	
Total valid votes		163,018	98.63	
Rejected ballots		2,280	1.37	
Majority		67,291	41.28	
Registered electors		401,833		
PTI gain from MQM-P				

== By-election 2018 ==
By-elections were held in this constituency on 14 October 2018.

By-election 2018: NA-243 Karachi East-II
Party	Candidate	Votes	%	±%
PTI	Alamgir Khan	37,035	58.82	▲2.77
MQM-P	Amir Chishti	15,434	24.51	▲9.74
PPP	Hakim Ali	6,808	10.81	▲4.29
Others	Others (nineteen candidates)	3,686	5.86	
Turnout		63,252	15.71	▼25.43
Total valid votes		62,963	99.54	▲0.91
Rejected ballots		289	0.46	▼0.91
Majority		21,601	34.31	▼6.97
Registered electors		402,731		
PTI hold		Swing	▼3.49	

== Election 2024 ==
General elections were held on 8 February 2024. Hassaan Sabir won the election with 38,871 votes.

General election 2024: NA-236 Karachi East-II
Party	Candidate	Votes	%	±%
MQM-P	Hassaan Sabir	38,871	28.76	▲4.25
PPP	Muhammad Muzammil Qureshi	32,231	23.85	▲13.04
JI	Muhammad Osama Razi Khan	21,082	15.60	N/A
Others	Others (Thirty one candidates)	42,980	31.80	
Turnout		135,215	24.93	▲9.22
Total valid votes		135,164	99.96	
Rejected ballots		51	0.04	
Majority		6,640	4.91	
Registered electors		542,409		
MQM-P gain from PTI				

== See also ==
- NA-235 Karachi East-I
- NA-237 Karachi East-III
