= Ali Haider Zaidi =

Pakistani politician, federal minister

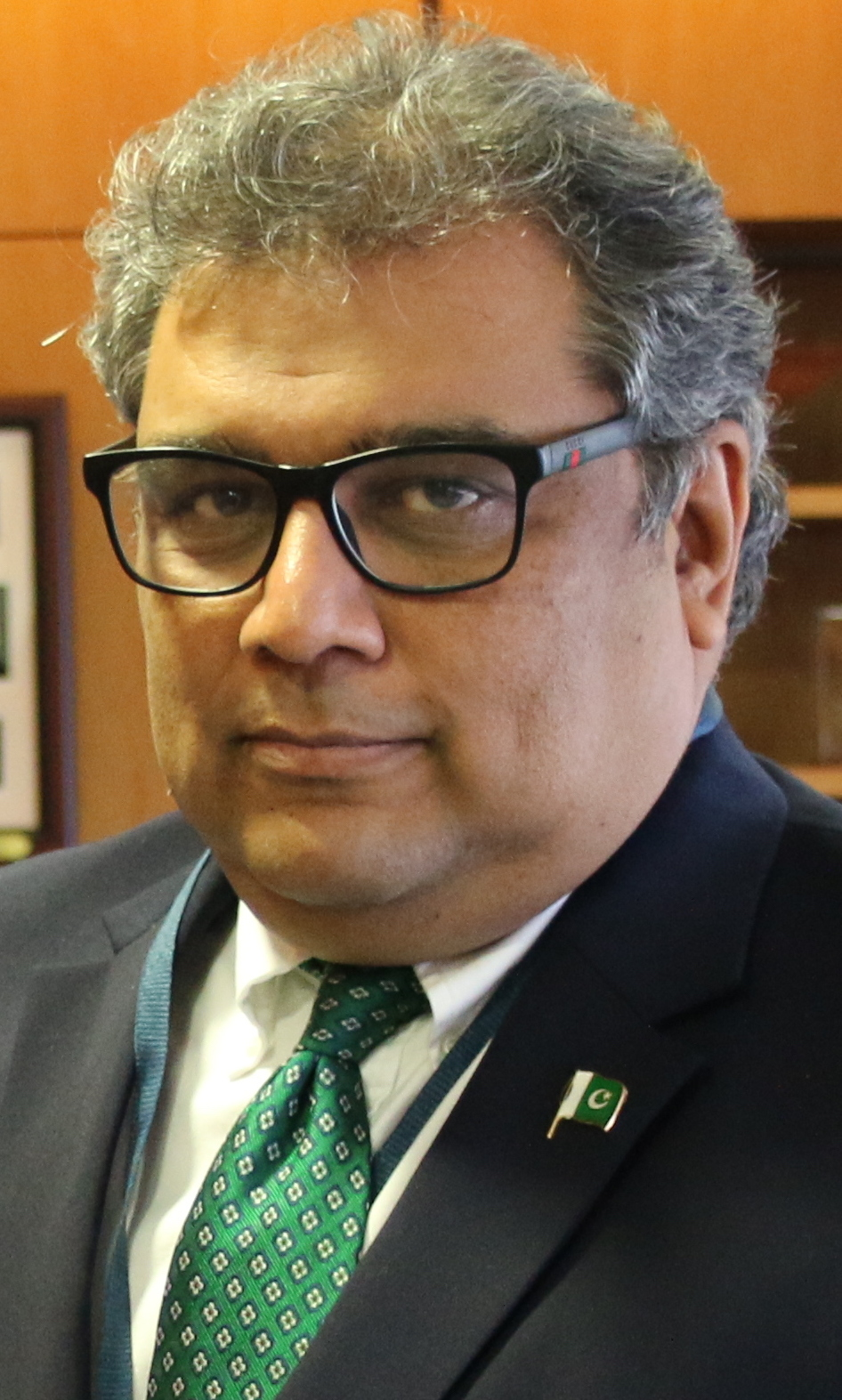

Federal Minister for Maritime Affairs
- In office 11 September 2018 – 10 April 2022
- President: Arif Alvi
- Prime Minister: Imran Khan
- Preceded by: Mir Hasil Khan Bizenjo
- Succeeded by: Faisal Subzwari

Member of the National Assembly of Pakistan
- In office 13 August 2018 – 17 January 2023
- Constituency: NA-244 (Karachi East-III)

President of PTI Sindh
- In office 25 December 2021 – 27 May 2023
- Chairman: Imran Khan
- Preceded by: Haleem Adil Sheikh
- Succeeded by: Haleem Adil Sheikh

Personal details
- Born: Karachi, Sindh, Pakistan

Syed Ali Haider Zaidi (Urdu: علی حیدر زیدی) (born 11 September 1952) is a Pakistani politician who served as the Federal Minister for Maritime Affairs from 11 September 2018 to 10 April 2022. He also served as the President of Pakistan Tehreek-e-Insaf's Sindh chapter. He remained a member of the National Assembly of Pakistan from August 2018 to January 2023. In 2023, he quit the PTI following the May 9 riots, perceived as attack coordinated by Imran Khan on Pakistan's institutions, especially the military.

== Political career ==
Zaidi was running a business in the United States when he first met Imran Khan in 1995 at a Shaukat Khanum Memorial Cancer Hospital fundraiser. The two remained in contact, and Zaidi became involved in politics in late 1999, contesting his first election in 2002 on a PTI ticket.

He ran for the seat of the Provincial Assembly of Sindh as a candidate of PTI from Constituency PS-116 (Karachi-XXVIII) in the 2002 general elections, but was unsuccessful. He received 2,941 votes and lost the seat to Nasrullah Khan, a candidate of the MMA.

He ran for the seat of the National Assembly of Pakistan as a candidate of PTI from Constituency NA-252 (Karachi-XIV) and from Constituency NA-208 (Jacobabad) in the 2013 general elections but was unsuccessful. He received 49,622 votes from NA-252 (Karachi-XIV) and lost to Abdul Rashid Godil). He received 7,589 votes from NA-208 (Jacobabad) and lost the seat to Aijaz Hussain Jakhrani.

On 25 December 2014, he was appointed as president of PTI's Karachi chapter. In December 2015, he announced that he would resign as president of PTI's Karachi chapter in the aftermath of party's poor performance in local government elections.

He was elected to the National Assembly from the Constituency NA-244 (Karachi East-III) as a candidate of PTI in 2018 general elections.

On 11 September 2018, he was inducted into the federal cabinet of Prime Minister Imran Khan and was appointed as Federal Minister for Maritime Affairs.

Ali Zaidi was appointed as PTI's Sindh Chapter president by Imran Khan on 25 December 2021.

In May 2023, Zaidi announced his resignation from PTI and stated his intention to leave politics, following what he described as a “difficult decision” after the violent events of 9 May.

== Philanthropy ==
Following the 2005 earthquake in Azad Kashmir, Zaidi initiated the creation of the Imran Khan Foundation to support disaster relief, as the Imran Khan Cancer Appeal Foundation, registered as a 501(c)(3) charity in the U.S., was restricted to supporting the cancer hospital. Within ten days, the new foundation raised between $600,000 and $1 million for earthquake victims and later secured its own 501(c)(3) status. The foundation also supported initiatives like Namal University.

In response to the 2010 Pakistan floods, Zaidi led fundraising efforts that raised close to $3 million in three weeks, with total contributions exceeding $6 million.
