= St. Peter's Church, Karachi =

Church building in Pakistan

St. Peter’s Church
- Location: Akhtar Colony, Karachi
- Country: Pakistan
- Denomination: Roman Catholic

History
- Dedicated: 9 November 2011

Architecture
- Architect: Kausar Ali
- Style: brown brick
- Groundbreaking: 22 November 2009
- Construction cost: Rupees 5 million

Specifications
- Capacity: 5,000
- Height: 24 meters

Administration
- Archdiocese: Roman Catholic Archdiocese of Karachi
- Parish: St Paul's Parish, Azam Basti

St. Peter's Church is the largest Catholic church in Karachi, Sindh, Pakistan.

== Construction ==
The church, completed in just 11 months, spans 1,858 square meters and accommodates up to 5,000 people. Standing at over 24 meters tall, its stained glass windows depict various religious scenes. The construction cost was US$3.8 million.

== Opening ==
The Apostolic Nuncio to Pakistan Archbishop Edgar Pena Parra blessed the church at a Mass concelebrated by 37 priests from around the country. The Apostolic Nuncio read a message of Pope Benedict XVI to Pakistani Catholics. Later the Papal Nuncio also blessed the Perpetual Adoration Chapel, a room built of glass in a corner of the church open for prayer 24 hours of the day.

== Miscellaneous ==
The church will cater to the people of Akhtar Colony, Mahmudabad, Kashmir Colony and Manzoor Colony.

Funding for the project came from the Pontifical Mission Societies, Missio, the Rothenberg diocese in Germany and the Italian Bishop's Conference.
