= 2021 Karachi explosion =

2021 Karachi explosion may refer to:

- 2021 Karachi grenade attack, in August
- December 2021 Karachi explosion
