= Saint Patrick's Cathedral, Karachi =

Cathedral in Karachi, Sindh, Pakistan

St. Patricks Cathedral
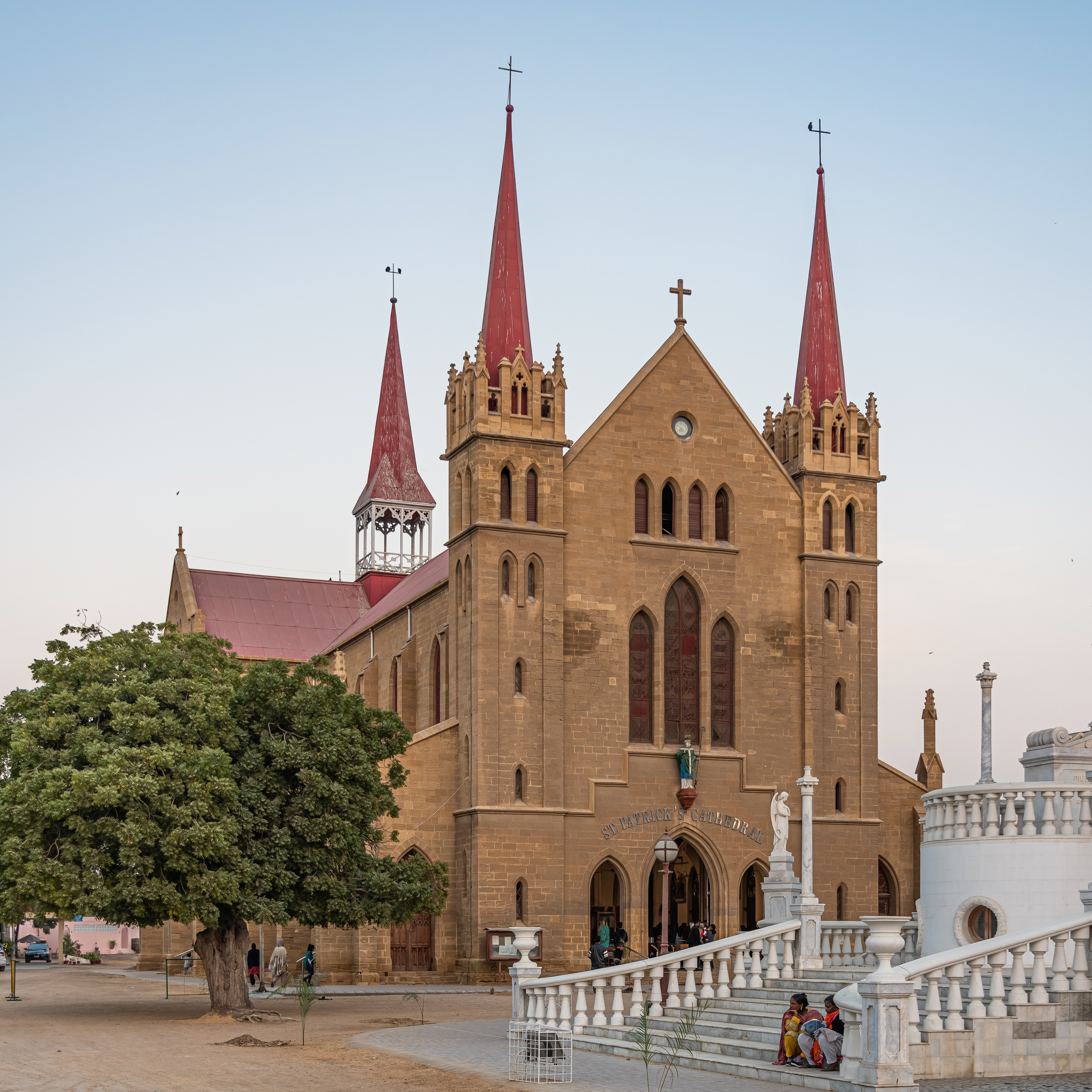

Religion
- Affiliation: Roman Catholic
- Diocese: Archdiocese of Karachi
- Leadership: Archbishop Benny Mario Travas
- Year consecrated: 1881

Location
- Location: Karachi, Pakistan
- Interactive map of St. Patricks Cathedral
- Coordinates: 24.8619°N 67.0351°E

Architecture
- Architects: Father Karl Wagner, SJ
- Style: Gothic Revival
- Groundbreaking: 1879

Specifications
- Capacity: 1500
- Length: 52 metres
- Width: 22 metres

St. Patrick's Cathedral is the seat of the Roman Catholic Archdiocese of Karachi, and is located near the Empress Market in the Saddar locality in central Karachi. The church was completed in 1881, and can accommodate 1,500 worshipers. At the front of the cathedral, there is the Monument to Christ the King, built between 1926 and 1931 to commemorate the Jesuit mission in Sindh.

== History ==
The first church in Sindh, called St. Patrick’s Church, was built on the grounds of the cathedral in 1845 as a Carmelite mission at a cost of 6,000 rupees under the leadership of Karachi's first Carmelite priest, Father Casaboch. As the Catholic population of the city grew, the city's Catholics raised money for construction of a new church. Groundbreaking was done in 1878, and the church was consecrated on 24 April 1881. Despite the construction of the new building, the little church continued to function until it was destroyed by a storm in 1885.

=== Post-partition ===
In 1978 the cathedral celebrated its centenary. The Pakistan Post Office issued special commemorative stamps on the occasion. Pope John Paul I sent special greetings and blessings on the occasion.

In November 1991 the cathedral was visited by Mother Teresa of Calcutta. Cardinal Joseph Cordeiro of Karachi also spoke on the occasion.

A bomb exploded inside the Cathedral causing an injury and destruction. The explosion on 22 December 1998, occurred minutes after the congregation celebrated Mass. Most people had departed when the bomb went off. One woman was wounded and there was partial damage to the interior of the cathedral.

The cathedral's grounds are adorned with a marble Monument to Christ the King, which was constructed in 1931 to commemorate the memory of the Jesuit Mission in Sindh.

In 2003, the cathedral was declared as a protected monument because of its outstanding architectural beauty under the Sindh Cultural Heritage Protection Act.

The Cathedral, with a seating capacity of 2,000, used to be the biggest Catholic church in the country. On 9 November 2011 the apostolic nuncio to Pakistan Archbishop Edgar Pena Parra blessed St. Peter’s Church, Karachi, now the largest Catholic church in Pakistan. It can seat 5,000 people.

In December 2018, the celebration of the 175th anniversary of the parish was led by the Archbishop of Karachi Joseph Cardinal Coutts. He also launched the book St Patrick’s: A Journey of 175 Years by Goretti and Michael Ali, written specially for the occasion.

On 5 October 2019 the Archbishop announced that Fr. Saleh Diego would be the new parish priest of St. Patrick's Parish.

On 11 February 2021, Pope Francis appointed Bishop Benny Travas of Multan to succeed Cardinal Joseph Coutts as Archbishop of Karachi. Travas was installed as Archbishop of Karachi at this Cathedral on 11 April 2021.

== Design ==
The present-day cathedral is built in Gothic Revival architecture; it measures 52 metres by 22 metres, and has the capacity to accommodate at least 1,500 worshippers at the same time. It was designed and realized by three members of the Society of Jesus: The design of the cathedral was conceived by the architect Father Karl Wagner, SJ and the construction was supervised by the lay Brothers George Kluver, SJ and Herman Lau, SJ.

The Gazetteer of the Province of Sindh provides a description of the cathedral:

Its exterior is not ornamental, though striking from a distance, but money and art have been lavished on the interior. The chancel, itself spacious, acquires a special impressiveness but its additional height, while the noble contours of the aspiring altar are seen to the best advantage. The whole interior is painted in oil and the windows are all of stained glass, donated by the members of the congregation.

=== Stained-glass windows ===
The cathedral's stained-glass windows were produced by Franz Mayer of Munich in Germany. They depict the following scenes:

1. Pentecost
2. The sacrifice of Melchisedek
3. The sacrifice of Isaac
4. The Paschal lamb
5. The miraculous Manna
6. The annunciation
7. The visitation
8. The Nativity of Jesus
9. The Presentation of Jesus at the Temple
10. The flight into Egypt
11. The boy Jesus in the temple
12. The death of Joseph
13. The baptism of Jesus
14. The wedding at Cana
15. St. Peter receives the keys
16. Jesus raises Lazarus to life
17. The institution of the Eucharist
18. Agony of Jesus
19. Jesus carries his cross
20. The Crucifixion
21. The resurrection of Jesus
22. The Ascension of Jesus
23. The crowning of Our Lady
24. The first Jesuits

== Choir ==
The first music mistress was Sr. Fredericka FC who served from 1878 to 1902.

From the 1920s to the 70s, the Cathedral had a polyphonic choir of about thirty members. The members were: Sopranos: Jessie Fernandez, Olive D'Costa, Mary D'Silva, Hilda Freitas, Winnie Lobo, Carol Lobo

Altos: Essie Menezes, Emma Correa, Nita Dias, Maureen Rodrigues, Ioline Fitchew, Ann Fitchew Armstrong

Bases: Eustach Caldera, Sonoo D'Abreo, Austen Frietas, Isaac Noronha, R. C. Fernandes

Tenors: Vincent D'Abreo, Vincent Lobo, Glenn D'Abreo, Hector Lewis, Joseph Moniz, Derek Domingo

The choir was conducted at first in the 1920s and 1930s by Carlos Fernandes, who was replaced by C. M. Lobo until the early 1970s when he was replaced by his nephew Vincent Lobo. The organists for the choir had been C. M. Lobo before he took over the position of director and then Leo DeSousa who was followed by Fr. Ronnie Colaco until the choir folded in May 1974. It was never replaced by a polyphonic choral group of its previous capability.

In 2018 the parish had five choirs: the Seniors, Shamrock, Praise in Harmony, Cathedral choir and Urdu choir.

== Gallery ==
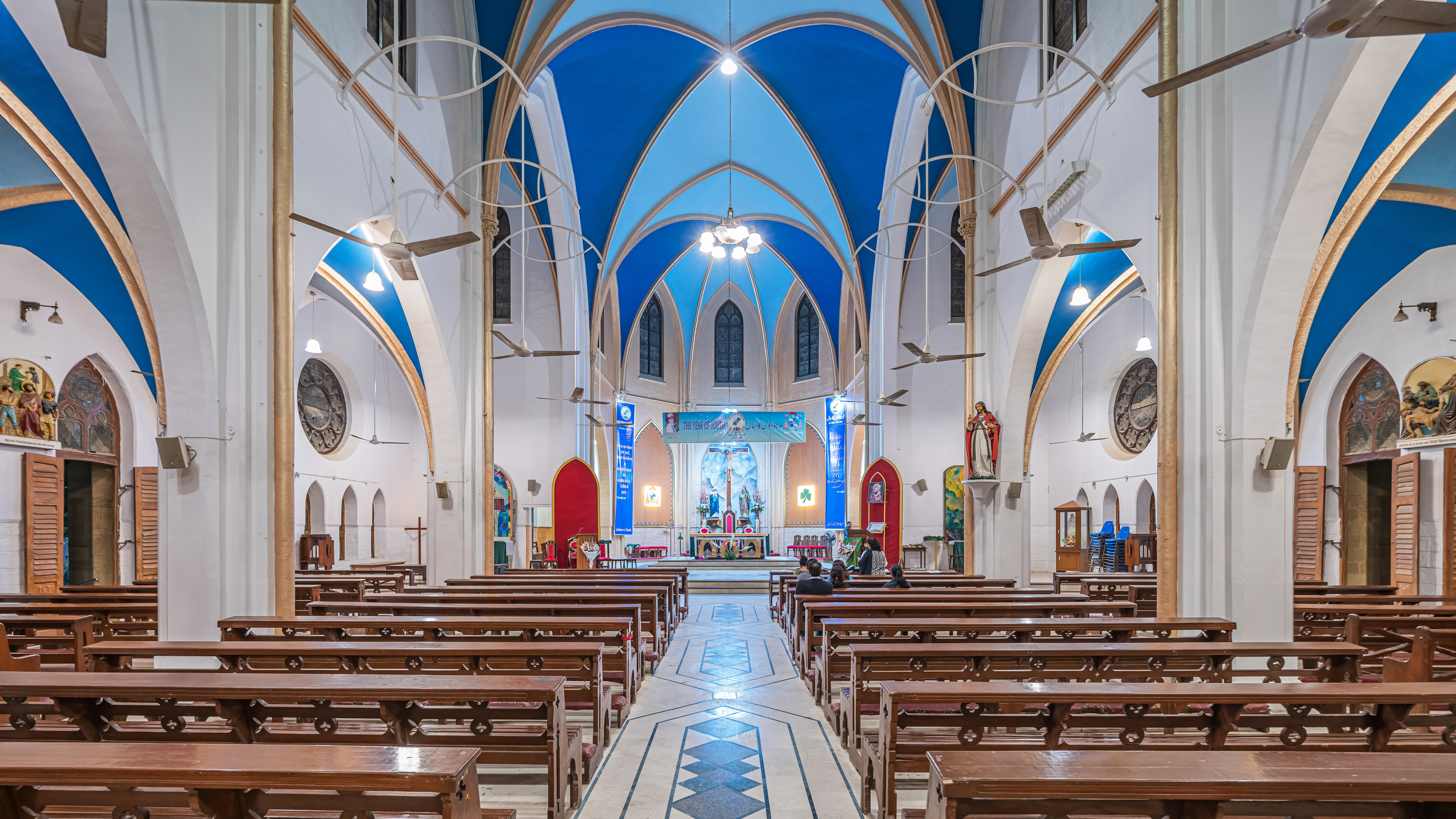
Interior of the cathedral

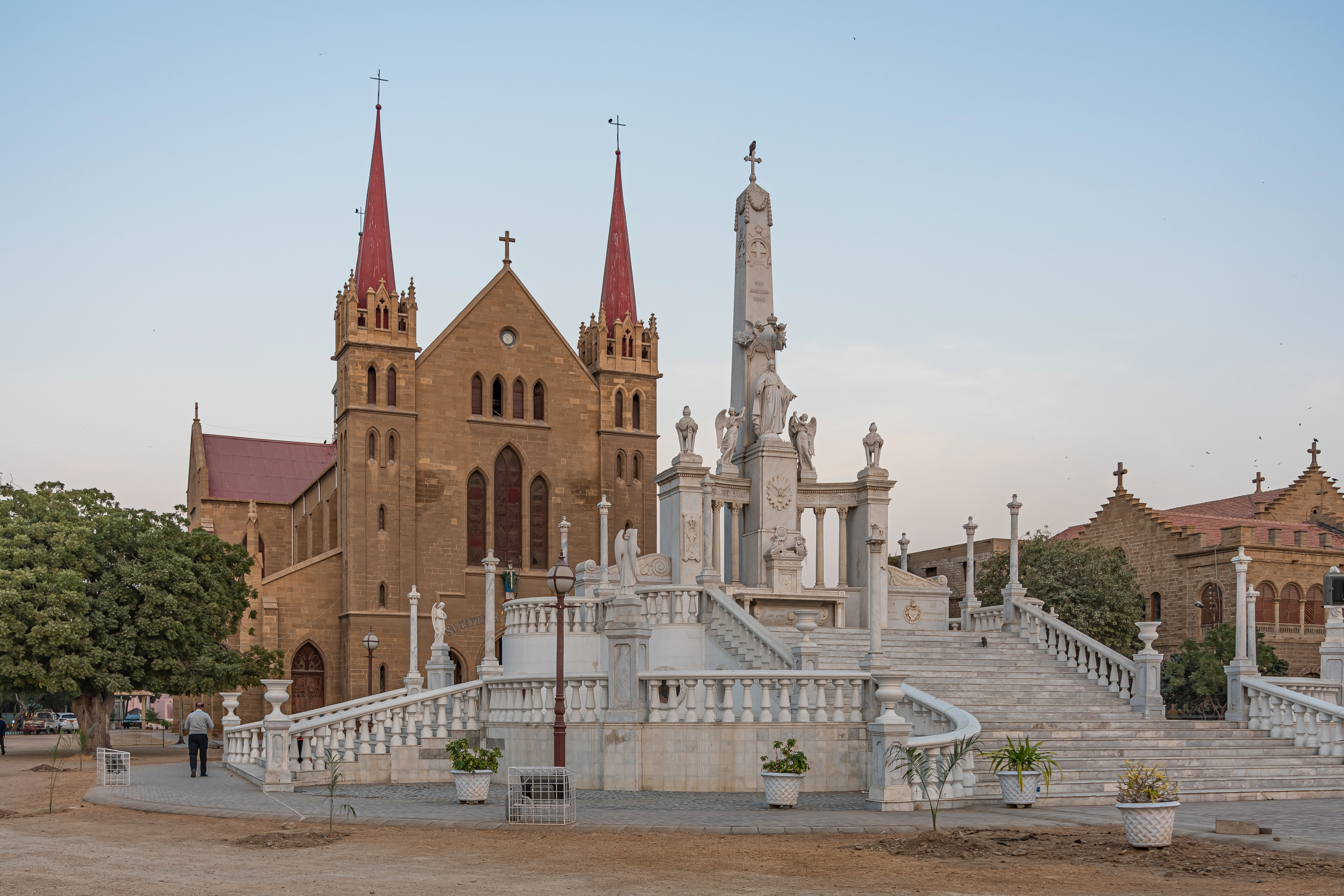
Monument to Christ the King with Saint Patrick's Cathedral

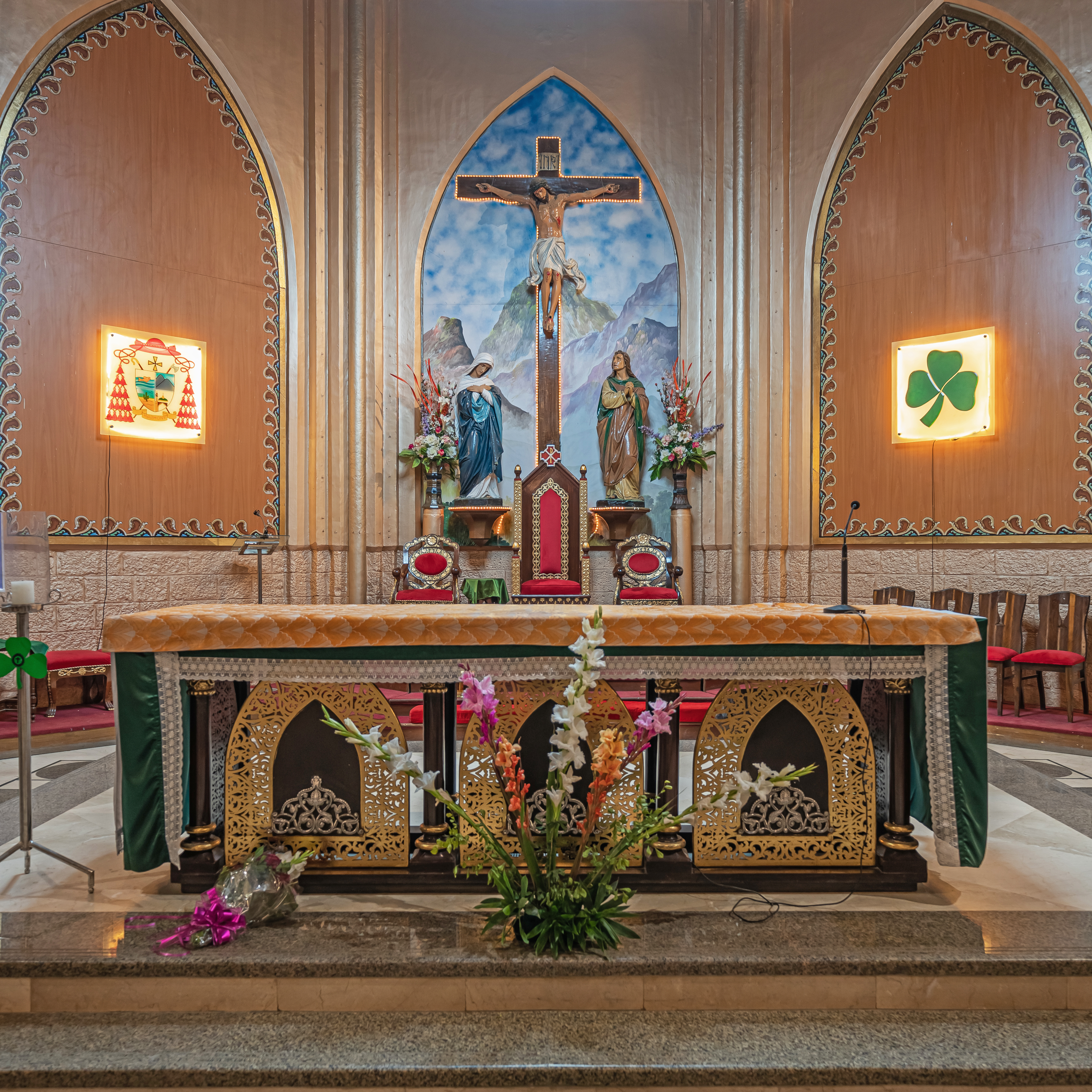
The altar

== Parish Priests ==
- Fr. Francis Casabosch OCD 1844–1847
- Fr. J. Lopez 1847–1850
- Fr. G. D'Silva 1850
- Fr. P. Ireneus OCD 1850–1851
- Fr. Joh Chrysostomus OCD 1852–1852
- Fr. Andres Jesu Mariae OCD 1853–1853
- Fr. R. J. Periston 1854–1855
- Fr. P. Felix O. Cap. 1855–1858
- Fr. P. Raphael O. Cap. 1858–1859
- Fr. George Bridges SJ 1859
- Fr. G. Strickland SJ 1859
- Fr. Joseph Willy SJ 1859–1865
- Fr. Basilius Haefly SJ 1865–1867
- Fr. Anselm Leiter SJ 1867–1868
- Fr. Nicolas Pagani SJ 1868–1872
- Fr. George Bridges SJ 1872–1874
- Fr. Joseph Nueckel SJ 1874–1876
- Fr. Francis Belz SJ 1876–1887
- Fr. A. Bruder SJ 1887–1894
- Fr. H. Jurgens SJ 1894–1897
- Fr. T. Peters SJ 1897–1900
- Fr. J. B. Schroeter SJ 1900–1910
- Fr. C. Gertler SJ 1910
- Fr. A. Gyr SJ 1910–1916
- Fr. D. Lynch SJ 1916–1918
- Fr. E. Farrell SJ 1918–1920
- Fr. S. Boswin SJ 1920–1922
- Fr. J. Meyer SJ 1922–1923
- Fr. Vincent Gimenez SJ 1922–1935
- Fr. Valens Wienk OFM 1935–1936
- Fr. Salesius Lemmens OFM 1936–1938
- Fr. Alcuinus van Miltenburg OFM 1938–1940
- Fr. Achilles Meersman OFM 1940–1941
- Fr. Alcuinus van Miltenburg OFM 1941–1943
- Fr. Floregius Rypma OFM 1943–1955
- Fr. Modestine Pöttgens OFM 1955–1966
- Fr. Francis de Souza 1966–1975
- Fr. Robert D'Silva 1975–1983
- Fr. Anthony Martis 1983–1992
- Fr. James DeSouza 1992–2000
- Fr. Achilles DeSouza 2000–2001
- Fr. Joseph D'Mello 2001–2007
- Fr. Edward Joseph 2007–2014
- Fr. Mario A. Rodrigues 2014–2019
- Fr. Saleh Diego 2019–2021
- Fr. Ryan Joseph 2021–2023
- Fr. Benjamin Shahzad 2023–

== See also ==
- Monument to Christ the King
- List of Jesuit sites
