= Jacob Lines =

Jacob Lines may refer to:

- Jacob Lines (Karachi), a neighbourhood of Jamshed Town, Pakistan
- Jakob Lines, a defunct Finnish ferry operator
