= Gulistan-e-Zafar =

Neighborhood in Karachi

Coordinates: 24°51′N 67°03′E

Gulistan-e-Zafar (Urdu: گلستانِ ظفر) is one of the neighbourhoods of Jamshed Town in Karachi, Sindh, Pakistan.

There are several ethnic groups including Muhajirs, Punjabis, Sindhis, Kashmiris, Seraikis, Pakhtuns, Balochis, Memons, Bohras Ismailis and Christians.
