= Monument to Christ the King =

Coordinates: 24.86187°N 67.03495°E

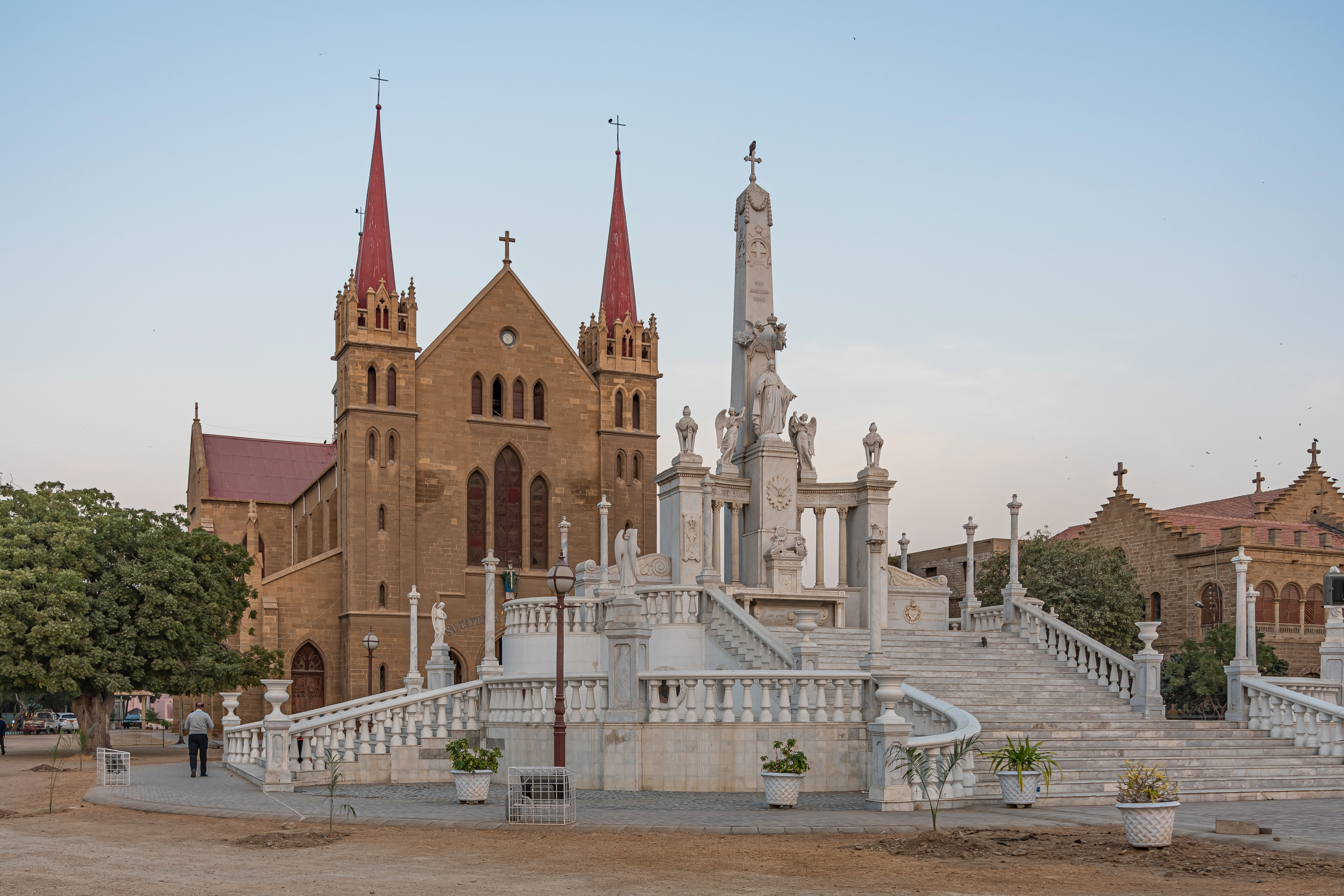
- Christ the King Monument
- Monument to Christ the King
- Location: Karachi
- Country: Pakistan
- Denomination: Roman catholic
- Website: http://archdioceseofkarachi.org//

History
- Founded: 1927
- Founder: Vincent Gimenez S.J.
- Dedication: October 18, 1931
- Events: annual procession on feast of Christ the King restoration completed in 2013

Architecture
- Architectural type: white Carrara marble structure with statue of Christ the King
- Completed: October 1931
- Construction cost: Rs. 81,500

Specifications
- Capacity: 150
- Length: 111 feet
- Width: 111 feet
- Height: 54 feet

Administration
- Archdiocese: Roman Catholic Archdiocese of Karachi
- Parish: Saint Patrick's Cathedral, Karachi

The Monument to Christ the King is a white marble structure in the grounds of Saint Patrick's Cathedral, Karachi, Pakistan.

== History ==
This monument stands overlooking one of the busiest streets of Karachi – Shahrah-e-Iraq. The idea for this 54 feet high architectural beauty emerged in 1926. It is the only structure of its kind in the city of Karachi and is popular with tourists.

Vincent Gimenez S.J. was the Parish Priest of St. Patrick’s Parish when Pope Pius IX initiated the Feast of Christ the King (celebrated on the last Sunday in October) in 1925. Fr. Gimenez was the first to introduce the procession of Christ the King through the streets of Saddar Town in October 1926.

In 1927 the local branch of the Apostleship of Prayer conceived the idea of erecting a monument that would be a symbol of devotion to the Sacred Heart of Jesus. The Catholics of Karachi and surrounding areas got together and formed a Board consisting of 26 members. Fr. Gimenez was the President, R.A.M D’Silva was General Secretary and C. S. Lobo was Treasurer.

In addition, 14 Catholic Associations connected with the parish and representative of the community around 80 persons also went about collecting donations, expediting the work of planning and overseeing construction.

== Construction ==
The Monument was designed by M. X Andrade and the construction was supervised by August Rodrigues, retired Superintendent Engineer Public Works Department, Bombay. The marble for this monument was imported from Carrara, Italy through Anthony Coutinho and Company. The statue of Christ the King installed high above the ground was a gift from Major Quadros of Cincinnatus Town, Karachi.

The crypt has a seating capacity for 150 people and is adorned with two murals - one of heaven and the other of hell, the work of a Mr. Vaz, a Goan artist. The crypt also houses a replica of St. Francis Xavier. The total cost of the monument was Rs.81,500.

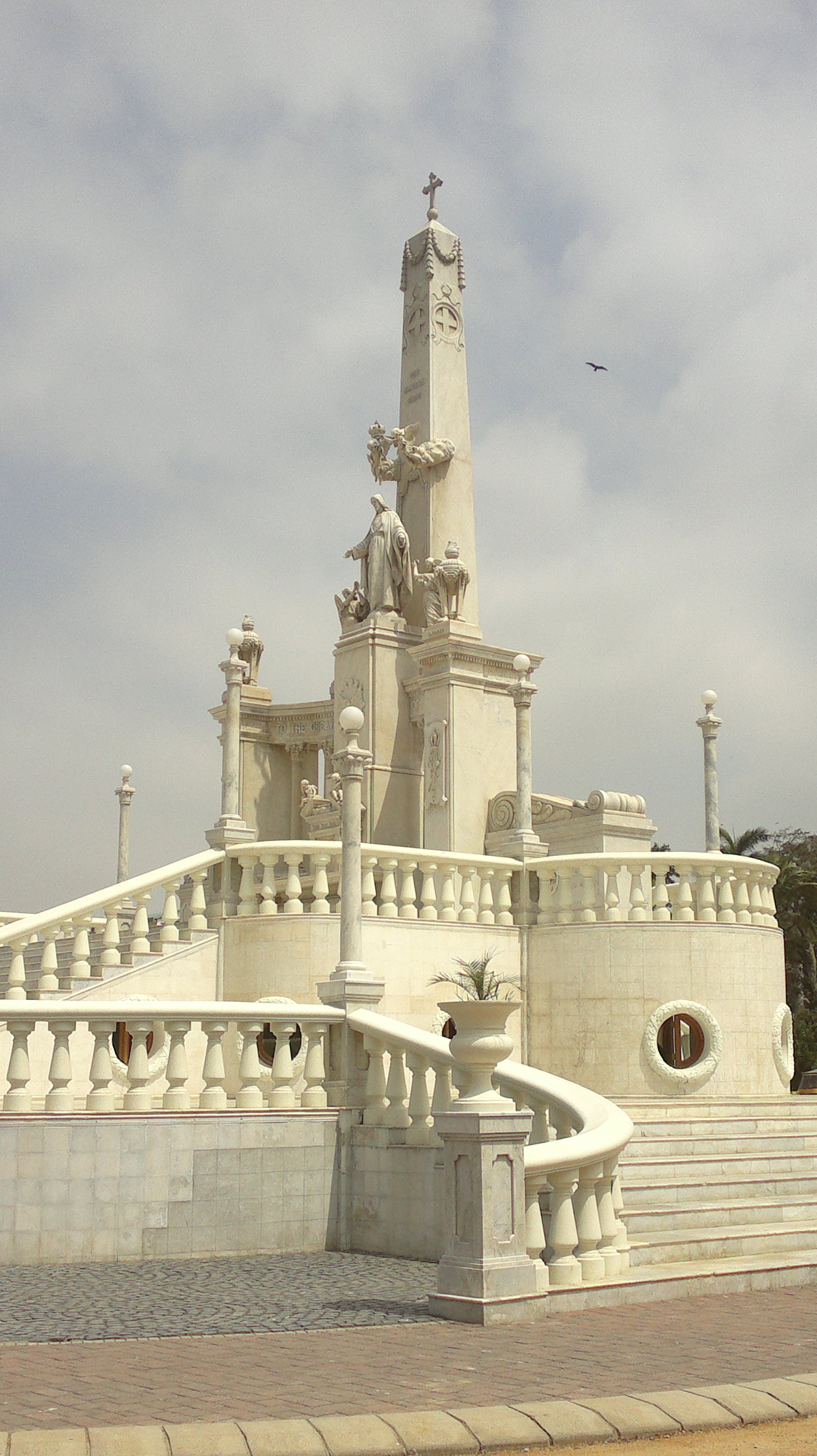

== Inauguration ==
The celebrations for the inauguration of the monument lasted for nine days. Eleven committees were formed: Congress committee, Music committee, Stage committee, Pageant committee, Procession committee, Street Decoration committee and an Accommodation committee.

After four years of planning and construction the monument was completed. On October 17, 1931 there was an investiture ceremony of the new Knight of St. Gregory the Great followed by a Passion play which was held at St. Patrick’s School. Over two hundred people took part in this play which ran for four days, to packed houses. This was the first time that microphones and loud speakers were used at a function at St. Patrick’s.

The next day a Pontifical High Mass was celebrated followed by the opening of the Congress of Catholic Action, by the Delegate Apostolic to the East Indies, Mgr. Leo P. Kierkels C.P. After a short inaugural address and the reading of the telegram sent by the Pope, the hymn to Christ the King was sung. After a short speech by the President of the Executive Board, Fr. Gimenez, the monument was blessed by Kierkels.

This ceremony was attended by a large segment of society including many non-Catholics. Church officials from this part of the world, priests and religious from all over India also joined the thousands of locals in this celebration.

During the week Masses were held at the Monument by the different organizations of the parish. Later a two mile long procession led by the band of St. Patrick’s Cadet Corps, and followed by parishioners dressed as various characters of the Bible.

Jamshed Nusserwanjee Mehta, President of the Municipal Corporation led a large section of non-Catholics in the procession. At the conclusion fireworks lit up the night sky.

== Feast day ==
The Feast of Christ the King is celebrated on the last Sunday in November, just before the start of Advent. There was an annual procession from St Patrick’s Cathedral in Saddar, known as the Christ the King Procession, in which members of the Catholic community took part; it was nearly quarter of a mile long. However, it was stopped in the mid-1960s due to congestion on the streets and some cases of harassment.

== Recent events ==
On its 80th anniversary, the monument is greatly damaged by the ravages of weather and time. Most of the bordering and pavements surrounding the monument as well as the cathedral building have been removed. The salinity in the soil had destroyed its base. Parts of it are broken and unless measures are taken to repair and save the structure it may not survive to see its century.

== Restoration ==
On September 27, 2011 a fundraising drive was initiated to raise money to renovate the Christ the King monument. 10 million rupees (US$115,000) were needed to save the ancient cultural heritage of the Church.

In 2012 the Archbishop Emeritus of Karachi formed a committee for the restoration and preservation of Monument. Menin Rodrigues was appointed as Project Head and Roland deSouza as the Technical Coordinator.

The restoration was completed in 2013. On 24 November 2013, the Feast of Christ the King, Archbishop Edgar Pena Parra, Apostolic Nuncio to Pakistan, blessed the monument after completion of the restoration work. The NED University of Engineering and Technology was one of the main contributors to the repair work which cost Rs 8.5 million.
