= Cincinnatus D'Abreo =

Portuguese administrator and politician (1862–1929)

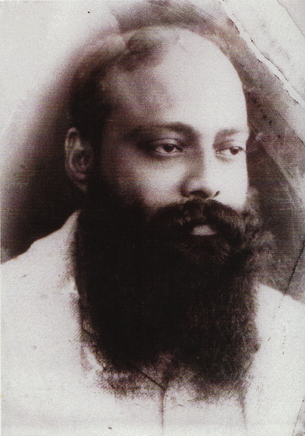
- Born: Cincinnatus Fabian D'Abreo; 24 September 1862; Goa, Portuguese India
- Died: 25 January 1929 (aged 66); Karachi, British India
- Education: St Patrick's High School, Karachi
- Occupations: Administrator; politician
- Known for: Founding the Karachi Goan Association and Cincinnatus Town
- Notable work: Contribution to civic life in Karachi, British India
- Board member of: President of the Karachi Municipality; Indian Life Assurance Company; Karachi Building and Development Company
- Spouse: Maggie Gomes
- Children: 5

Cincinnatus Fabian D'Abreo (24 September 1862 – 25 January 1929) was a Portuguese administrator and politician based in Karachi, British India.

== Biography ==
Cincinnatus D'Abreo was born on 24 September 1862. His father, Manuel D’Abreo, had migrated to Sindh in 1846. He was educated at St Patrick's High School, Karachi but had to discontinue his studies at the age of 16 and earn a living due to the unfortunate death of his father. He was first employed by the Civil and Military Gazette Press as a clerk. Two years later he joined the British business, Forbes, Forbes and Campbell, engaged in the import and export trade. In 1889, at the age of 27, he joined the Sind Commissioner's office as a clerk. In 1895, he was promoted to the position of assistant collector of Sukkur and finally was elected president of the municipality.

In 1897, he returned to Karachi, where he occupied various posts such as assistant collector of customs, and shipping master. He was appointed acting collector of customs on two occasions. He was a councillor of Karachi Municipality for many years and made contributions to civic life in Karachi.

D’Abreo was instrumental in starting the Karachi Goan Association. He also played a part in the launch of the Indian Flour Mills, the Union Press, and the Indian Life Assurance Company, of which he was secretary for many years. He was one of the directors of the Karachi Building and Development Company.

In 1917, he retired from service and devoted himself to various social activities. He was held in high esteem by the people of Karachi, who named him among the 12 leading citizens of Sindh. He died on 25 January 1929, aged 66.

He acquired 1,000 acres (4.0 km^{2}) of land outside the cantonment. In 1908, this was developed into Karachi's first planned township named Cincinnatus Town, which today forms part of Garden East.

== Family ==
Cincinnatus was married to Mary Josephine (Maggie) Gomes with whom he had five children: Joseph Herman Francis, Margaret, Alfred Rudolph, Gwendolyn and William Emmanuel.
