= Sindh Muslim Cooperative Housing Society =

Residential neighbourhood in Karachi, Pakistan

Coordinates: 24°51′N 67°03′E

Sindh Muslim Cooperative Housing Society is one of the neighbourhoods of Jamshed Town in Karachi, Sindh, Pakistan.
