= Sagheer Ahmad =

Pakistani politician

Member of the Provincial Assembly of Sindh
- Constituency: PS-117 Karachi-XXIX

Personal details
- Born: 23 November 1972 (age 53) Karachi, Sindh, Pakistan
- Party: MQM-P (2022-present)
- Other political affiliations: PSP (2016-2022); MQM-L (2003-2016)
- Parent: Ekram Uddin Ahmed Jamalvi (father)
- Education: MBBS

Sagheer Ahmad is a former Pakistani politician. He was a member of Pak Sarzameen Party (PSP).

== Early life ==
Sagheer Ahmad was born on 23 November 1972 in Karachi, Pakistan. He completed his MBBS from DUHS (Dow University of Health Sciences) and postgraduate education in Biochemistry.

== Political career ==
=== Muttahida Qaumi Movement ===
Sagheer had interest in politics from a young age. He was a part of MQM's organization APMSO.

==== Provincial Assembly of Sindh ====
In 2005, Sagheer Ahmad was elected to the Provincial Assembly of Sindh. He contested for the vacated seat of Provincial Environment Ministry and served at this post until 2007. Sagheer has been a member of the Provincial Assembly of Sindh for three times. His 2nd tenure in Provincial Assembly started in 2008 and continued till 2013.

He returned to Provincial Assembly in 2013 by winning Constituency PS-117 by securing forty three thousand votes.

==== Health Minister of Sindh ====
In 2008 he was designated 'Provincial Health-Minister' and held this ministry until 2014.

=== Pak Sarzameen Party ===
In March 2016 he ended his 28-year association with MQM and became the 1st to join the newly formed party of Anis Kaimkhani and Mustafa Kamal after he returned Pakistan. He also resigned from Provincial Assembly as he had won this seat on MQM ticket. He announced his decision of quitting MQM in a press conference where he sat along with Mustafa Kamal and stated that we hadn't joined MQM to get Ministries.

==== 2018 Pakistan general election ====
In 2018, Sagheer was contesting NA-245 (Karachi East 4) from Pak Sarzameen Party (PSP). However he failed winning the seat in the National Assembly of Pakistan. He received 6136 votes.

After losing the elections, Sagheer left PSP.
