= Sadiq Iftikhar =

Member of the National Assembly of Pakistan from Karachi (2024–2029)

- صادق افتخار

Member of the National Assembly of Pakistan
- In office 29 February 2024 – currently
- Constituency: NA-238 Karachi East-IV

Personal details
- Born: Karachi, Sindh, Pakistan
- Party: MQM-P (2018-present)

Sadiq Iftikhar (Urdu: صادق افتخار) is a Pakistani politician who is a member of the National Assembly of Pakistan. He is a member of the MQM-P.

== Political career ==
Iftikhar contested the NA-247 (Karachi South-II) by-election on 21 October 2018 as the Muttahida Qaumi Movement – Pakistan (MQM-P) candidate, finishing runner-up to PTI’s Aftab Hussain Siddiqui (32 ,464 votes to 14 ,114).

On 23 June 2022 he was appointed Special Assistant to the Prime Minister of Pakistan with the status of Minister of State.

As Minister of State and Special Assistant for Information Technology and Telecommunication, he represented Pakistan in regional digital-economy initiatives, including a 2023 delegation to Tehran to promote cooperation between Pakistani and Iranian technology firms.

He contested the Pakistani general election, 2024 and was elected to the National Assembly of Pakistan from NA-238 (Karachi East-IV) as an MQM-P candidate, taking office on 29 February 2024.

Following his election, he was appointed Chairman of the National Commission for Human Development (NCHD), a federal body focused on literacy and community development.

According to the NCHD official profile, he has also served as a Trustee of the Karachi Port Trust (KPT).
