= Hassaan Sabir =

Member of the National Assembly of Pakistan from Karachi (2024–2029)

- حسان صابر

Member of the National Assembly of Pakistan
- Incumbent
- Assumed office 29 February 2024
- Constituency: NA-236 Karachi East-II

Personal details
- Born: Karachi, Sindh, Pakistan
- Party: MQM-P (2024-present)
- Other political affiliations: PSP (2016-2023)

Hassaan Sabir (Urdu: حسان صابر) is a Pakistani politician who has been a member of the National Assembly of Pakistan since February 2024. He is a Barrister by Profession and has taken up numerous High-Profile Cases in the past.

== Political career ==
Sabir won the 2024 Pakistani general election from NA-236 Karachi East-II as a Muttahida Qaumi Movement – Pakistan candidate. He received 38,871 votes while runner up Muzammil Qureshi of Pakistan People’s Party received 32,231 votes.
