= Abyssinia Lines =

Place in Karachi, Sindh, Pakistan

Coordinates: 24°51′N 67°03′E

Abyssinia Lines is one of the neighbourhoods of Jamshed Town in Karachi, Sindh, Pakistan.

There are several ethnic groups including Muhajirs, Sindhis, Punjabis ,Kashmiris, Seraikis, Pakhtuns, Balochis, Memons, Bohras Ismailis, Baltis Nagaris commonly call Gilgitis and Christians. It was established as a colony for refugees from India who migrated to Pakistan soon after 1947.
