= PS-104 Karachi East-VIII =

Constituency of the Provincial Assembly of Sindh, Pakistan

- Constituency for the Provincial Assembly of Sindh
- Region: Ferozabad town (partly) of Karachi East District in Karachi
- Electorate: 215,694

Current constituency
- Member: Vacant
- Created from: PS-117 Karachi-XXIX (2002-2018); PS-105 Karachi East-VII (2018-2023)

PS-104 Karachi East-VIII (پی ایس-104، کراچی مشرقی-8) is a constituency of the Provincial Assembly of Sindh.

== General elections 2024 ==
Provincial election 2024: PS-104 Karachi East-VIII
Party	Candidate	Votes	%	±%
MQM-P	Muhammad Daniyal	30,465	40.24	
JI	Muhammad Junaid Mukati	23,588	31.15	
PTI	Amjad Asif Jah (Note: Filed nomination papers as PTI candidate but ECP allowed him to run as an Independent)	8,488	11.21	
PPP	Muhammad Akram	4,922	6.50	
PML(N)	Amjad Ali Asif	2,652	3.50	
TLP	Abdul Sattar	2,288	3.02	
Independent	Farhat Ullah Khan	969	1.28	
Independent	Hafiz Ghulam Mustafa	763	1.01	
Others	Others (twenty two candidates)	1,579	2.09	
Turnout		76,923	35.66	
Total valid votes		75,714	98.43	
Rejected ballots		1,209	1.57	
Majority		6,877	9.09	
Registered electors		215,694		
MQM-P gain from JI				

== General elections 2018 ==
Provincial election 2018: PS-105 Karachi East-VII
Party	Candidate	Votes	%	±%
PTI	Muhammad Ali Aziz	28,882	32.94	
MQM-P	Faisal Rafiq	20,284	23.14	
TLP	Ahmed Ali	11,753	13.41	
MMA	Sarwar Ali	10,964	12.51	
PML(N)	Tariq Mahmood	4,482	5.11	
PPP	Zulfiqar Ali Qaim Khani	3,503	4.00	
PSP	Mehmood Abdul Razzaque	3,493	3.98	
MQM-H	Khalid Hameed	1,691	1.93	
Independent	Muhammad Saad Ali	1,172	1.34	
Independent	Rehan	466	0.53	
Independent	Syed Nafees Ahmed	374	0.43	
Independent	Syed Muhammad Danish	209	0.24	
APML	Muhammad Rizwan Dossul	156	0.18	
Independent	Junaid Raza Rao	152	0.17	
Independent	Syed Abdul Subhan	38	0.04	
Independent	Arshad Ali	25	0.03	
Independent	Hafiz Muhammad Shehryar Khan	24	0.03	
Majority		8,598	9.80	
Valid ballots		87,668		
Rejected ballots		1,259		
Turnout		88,927		
Registered electors		238,155		
hold				

== General elections 2002 ==
General elections were held on 10 Oct 2002. Syed Mustafa Kamal of Muttahida Qaumi Movement won by 15,432 votes.

== General elections 2008 ==
General elections were held on 18 Feb 2008. Sagheer Ahmad of Muttahida Qaumi Movement won by 50,743 votes.

== General elections 2013 ==
General election 2013: PS-117 Karachi-XXIX
Party	Candidate	Votes	%	±%
MQM	Sagheer Ahmad	43,924		
PTI	Ahsan Jabbar	21750		
PML(N)	Syed Nisar Shah	3826		
MWM	Shakir Ali Rawjani	3496		
JI	Sabir Ahmed	2042		
JUI (F)	Sahib Syed	1389		
PPP	Pir Abdul Rasheed	1161		
MDM	Muhammad Naeem	635		
Independent	Mansoor Balouch	254		
Independent	Syed Muhammad Karim Farooq	168		
Independent	Syed Mumtaz Ali Zaidi	100		
MQM-H	Razzaque Khan	18		
APML	Syed Suleman Ali Ahmed	11		
Independent	Muhammad Imran Usman	7		
Independent	Syed Athar Ali	6		
Independent	Syed Naseeruddin Hussaini	6		
Total valid votes		78825	49.25	
Rejected ballots		148		
Registered electors		157,223		

== See also ==
- PS-103 Karachi East-VII
- PS-105 Karachi East-IX
