= Syed Ali Raza Abidi =

Pakistani politician

Member of the National Assembly of Pakistan
- In office 1 June 2013 – 31 May 2018
- Constituency: NA-251 (Karachi-XIII)

Personal details
- Born: 6 July 1972 Karachi, Sindh, Pakistan
- Died: 25 December 2018 (aged 46) Karachi, Sindh, Pakistan
- Manner of death: Assassination by gunshots
- Party: MQM (2013-2018)

Syed Ali Raza Abidi (Urdu: سید علی رضا عابدی; 6 July 1972 – 25 December 2018) was a Pakistani politician who was a member of the National Assembly of Pakistan from June 2013 until his assassination in May 2018.

== Early life ==
He was born on 6 July 1972 in Karachi, Pakistan to Syed Ikhlaq Hussain Abidi.

== Political career ==
He was elected to the National Assembly of Pakistan as a candidate of Muttahida Qaumi Movement (MQM) from Constituency NA-251 (Karachi-XIII) in the 2013 Pakistani general election. He received 81,603 votes and defeated Raja Azhar Khan, a candidate of Pakistan Tehreek-e-Insaf (PTI).

He ran for the seat of the National Assembly as a candidate of MQM Pakistan from Constituency NA-243 (Karachi East-II) in the 2018 Pakistani general election but was unsuccessful. He received 24,082 votes and lost the seat to Imran Khan.

== Death ==
He was shot dead in Karachi on 25 December 2018. The targeted gun attack took place outside his residence.
