= Haji Camp, Karachi =

Coordinates: 24°52′N 67°01′E

Haji Camp (Urdu: حاجی کیمپ) is one of the neighbourhoods of Lyari Town in Karachi, Sindh, Pakistan. The Hajji pilgrims lived here before taking the ships to Saudi Arabia to perform Hajj.

There are several ethnic groups in Haji Camp including Muhajirs, Sindhis, Punjabis, Kashmiris, Seraikis, Pakhtuns, Balochis, Memons, Bohras, Ismailis and Christians.

== See also ==
- Usmanabad
