= Jut Line =

Jut Lines جٹ لائنز
- Neighbourhood
- Country: Pakistan
- City: Karachi
- District: Karachi East
- Time zone: UTC+5 (PST)
- Postal code: 75300

Jut Line or Jutland Lines (Urdu: جٹ لائنز) is a neighborhood in Karachi East district of Karachi, Pakistan. It was previously administered as part of Jamshed Town, which was disbanded in 2011.

There are several ethnic groups in Jamshed Town including Muhajirs, Punjabis, Sindhis, Kashmiris, Seraikis, Pakhtuns, Balochis, Memons, Bohras, Ismailis, etc. Over 95% of the population is Muslim. There is also a small Hindu community with a newly built temple in this neighborhood. The population of Jamshed Town is estimated to be nearly one million.

The Baltistani Society and Abyssinia Lines neighbourhoods are located close to Jutland Lines.
