= Arsalan Taj Hussain =

Pakistani politician

Member of the Provincial Assembly of Sindh
- In office 13 August 2018 – 11 August 2023
- Constituency: PS-102 (Karachi East-IV)

Personal details
- Born: Karachi, Sindh, Pakistan
- Party: PTI (2007-present)

Arsalan Taj Hussain, also known as Arsalan Taj Ghumman, is a Pakistani politician who had been a member of the Provincial Assembly of Sindh from August 2018 to August 2023.

== Political career ==
He was elected to the Provincial Assembly of Sindh as a candidate of Pakistan Tehreek-e-Insaf from Constituency PS-102 (Karachi East-IV) in the 2018 Pakistani general election.

In March 2023, Arsalan Taj was picked up by policemen from his residence. He was later produced in the court after 24 hours. He was booked in couple of FIRs as claimed by the Sindh Government. He was sent on physical remand as requested by the Sindh Police in the court. Chairman PTI and Former Prime Minister of Pakistan Mr. Imran Khan also criticised the arrest of Arsalan Taj in a tweet. Arsalan Taj was granted bail by the ATC court on 22 March 2023.
