= Muhammad Hussain Mehanti =

Pakistani politician

Ameer of JI Karachi
- Incumbent
- Assumed office 2018

Member of the National Assembly of Pakistan
- In office 2002–2007
- Constituency: NA-252 (Karachi-XIV)

Personal details
- Party: JI (2002-present)
- Occupation: Politician

Muhammad Hussain Mehanti is a Pakistani politician who is the provincial Ameer (head) of Jamaat-e-Islami in Sindh. Hussain served as Member of the National Assembly from 2002 to 2007.
