= Baltistani Society =

Neighborhood of Jamshed Town in Karachi, Sindh, Pakistan

Coordinates: 24°51′N 67°03′E

Baltistani Society is one of the neighbourhoods of Jamshed Town in Karachi, Sindh, Pakistan.

The several ethnic groups residing in the area include Baltis, Muhajirs, Punjabis, Sindhis, Kashmiris, Seraikis, Pakhtuns, Baloch, Memons, Bohras Ismailis and Christians.
