= Abdul Rashid Godil =

Pakistani politician

Member of the National Assembly of Pakistan
- In office 2008 – 31 May 2018

Personal details
- Born: 7 September 1960 (age 65) Karachi, Sindh, Pakistan
- Party: PTI (2018)

Abdul Rashid Godil (Urdu: عبد الرشید گوڈیل; born 7 September 1960) is a Pakistani politician who had been a member of National Assembly of Pakistan, from 2008 to May 2018.

== Early life ==
Godil was born in Karachi on 7 September 1960 or on 17 September 1960. Early school at V M Public school dhoraji High school national college Graduation from university of Karachi

== Political career ==
In 1991, he was elected as a member of the All Pakistan Memon Federation and later, was elected as its president.

He began his political career in 2005 and became a union council Nazim the same year.

He was elected to the National Assembly of Pakistan from NA-252 (Karachi) on ticket of Muttahida Qaumi Movement in the 2008 Pakistani general election.

He was re-elected to the National Assembly of Pakistan from NA-252 (Karachi) on ticket of Muttahida Qaumi Movement in the 2013 Pakistani general election.

In June 2018, he quit MQM and joined PTI.
