= Alamgir Khan (politician) =

Pakistani politician and activist

Member of the National Assembly of Pakistan
- In office 29 October 2018 – 17 January 2023
- Constituency: NA-243 (Karachi East-II)

Personal details
- Born: Karachi, Sindh, Pakistan
- Party: PTI (2009-present)

Alamgir Khan (Urdu: عالمگیر خان) is a Pakistani activist and politician who had been a member of the National Assembly of Pakistan from October 2018 till January 2023. Khan belongs to the Mahsud tribe of South Waziristan currently living in Karachi, Pakistan.

On 18 December 2021, Khan was injured at a blast at a private bank branch in the Sher Shah area of Karachi.

== Activism ==
He is the founder of his own organization named as Fixit. While pursuing a Master of Business Administration degree from Iqra University, Khan started a campaign in January 2016 to spray-paint the portrait of then Chief Minister of Sindh Qaim Ali Shah alongside uncovered sewer holes and garbage dumps in various part of Karachi. The campaign, called Fix It, achieved wide coverage.

On 25 February 2016, he was arrested by the police after he attempted to empty the garbage bins outside the Sindh Chief Minister House in Karachi. The next day, he was released on bail. In March 2016, a city court in Karachi indicted him in a case of wrongful restraint.

Khan was also briefly arrested after a clash between FixIt volunteers and Pakistan People's Party (PPP) workers at Teen Talwar in June 2019.

== Political career ==
In August 2018, Khan was allocated Pakistan Tehreek-e-Insaf (PTI) ticket to contest the by-election from Constituency NA-243 (Karachi East-II).

He was elected to the National Assembly of Pakistan as a candidate of PTI from Constituency NA-243 (Karachi East-II) in a by-election held on 14 October 2018.

== More Reading ==
- List of members of the 15th National Assembly of Pakistan
