= PS-101 Karachi East-V =

Constituency of the Provincial Assembly of Sindh, Pakistan

- Constituency for the Provincial Assembly of Sindh
- Region: Gulshan-e-Iqbal town (partly) and Jamshed Quarters (partly) of Karachi East District in Karachi
- Electorate: 299,985

Current constituency
- Member: Vacant
- Created from: PS-118 Karachi-XXX (2002-2018); PS-102 Karachi East-IV (2018-2023)

PS-101 Karachi East-V (پی ایس-101، کراچی مشرقی-5) is a constituency of the Provincial Assembly of Sindh.

== General elections 2024 ==
Provincial election 2024: PS-101 Karachi East-V
Party	Candidate	Votes	%	±%
MQM-P	Moeed Anwar	43,859	34.79	
PTI	Agha Arsalan Khan (Note: Filed nomination papers as PTI candidate but ECP allowed him to run as an Independent)	35,186	27.91	
JI	Syed Qutub Ahmed	23,851	18.92	
PPP	Irnran Ali Mithani	9,828	7.80	
TLP	Muhammad Farooq Noorani	2,400	1.90	
Independent	Ali Tahir	1,919	1.52	
PRHP	Mehmood Ahmed	1,704	1.35	
PML(N)	Sobia Kiran	1,610	1.28	
Others	Others (thirty six candidates)	5,715	4.53	
Turnout		126,999	42.35	
Total valid votes		126,072	99.27	
Rejected ballots		927	0.73	
Majority		8,673	6.88	
Registered electors		299,895		
MQM-P gain from PTI				

== General elections 2018 ==
General elections were scheduled to be held on 25 July 2018. Arsalan Taj Hussain of Pakistan Tehreek-e-Insaf won the seat by securing 47,949 votes.

General election 2018: PS-102 Karachi East-IV
Party	Candidate	Votes	%	±%
PTI	Arsalan Taj Hussain	47,949	47.85	
MQM-P	Muhammad Arsalan Khan	17,337	17.30	
MMA	Syed Qutab Ahmed	12,576	12.55	
PPP	Muhammad Riaz	5,797	5.78	
PSP	Syed Farhan Ansari	5,362	5.35	
TLP	Muhammad Yahya	5,321	5.31	
PML(N)	Sheikh Yasir Adeel	4,178	4.17	
AAT	Sajid Islam	542	0.54	
APML	Shumaila Nadeem	215	0.21	
Independent	Muhammad Usman	158	0.16	
PST	Syed Shah Siraj ul Haq Qadri	127	0.13	
Independent	Dilawar Jackson	111	0.11	
MQM-H	S Arif Ur Rehman	104	0.10	
PKI-Ch.Anwar	Hajira Mazhar	93	0.09	
Independent	Ahsan Ali	76	0.08	
Independent	Mirza Shayan baig	63	0.06	
Peoples Movement of Pakistan	Anwaar Ahmed Farouqi	62	0.06	
Independent	Muhammad Ashraf Jabbar	40	0.04	
GDA	Muhammad Ashfaque	32	0.03	
Independent	Hafiz Muhammad Shehryar Khan	30	0.03	
Independent	Aamir Mujeeb	24	0.02	
Independent	Haris Ali Mithani	12	0.01	
Independent	Hassan Masood Ansari	2	0.01	
Turnout		101,749		
Total votes		245,872		
Majority				

== See also ==
- PS-100 Karachi East-IV
- PS-102 Karachi East-VI
