= Asad Alam Niazi =

Member of the National Assembly of Pakistan from Karachi (2024–2029)

- اسد عالم نیازی

Member of the National Assembly of Pakistan
- Incumbent
- Assumed office 29 February 2024
- Constituency: NA-237 Karachi East-III

Personal details
- Born: Karachi, Sindh, Pakistan
- Party: PPP (2024-present)

Asad Alam Niazi (Urdu: اسد عالم نیازی) is a Pakistani politician who has been a member of the National Assembly of Pakistan since February 2024.

== Political career ==
Niazi won the 2024 Pakistani general election from NA-237 Karachi East-III as a Pakistan People’s Party candidate. He received 40,836 votes while runners up Independent (PTI) Supported Pakistan Tehreek-e-Insaf, candidate Zahooruddin received 33,321 votes.
