= Mahmood Moulvi =

Pakistani politician and businessman

Member of the National Assembly of Pakistan
- In office 20 February 2023 – 10 August 2023
- Preceded by: Aamir Liaquat Hussain
- Constituency: NA-245 (Karachi East-IV)

Special Assistant to the Prime Minister for Maritime Affairs
- In office 25 May 2021 – 10 April 2022
- President: Arif Alvi
- Prime Minister: Imran Khan

President of IPP Sindh
- In office 23 June 2023 – 2 March 2025
- President: Aleem Khan
- Preceded by: Wahid Ali Khan

Personal details
- Born: Karachi, Sindh, Pakistan
- Occupation: Businessman; Activist; Politician
- Website: Mahmod Moulvi FB

Mahmood Baqi Moulvi (Urdu: محمود باقي مولوی) is a Pakistani politician who had been a member of the National Assembly from February 2023 till August 2023, elected from NA-245 (Karachi East-IV). He was also a Special Assistant to the Prime Minister for Maritime Affairs.

== Political career ==
=== 2018 ===
Moulvi ran to be a member of the National Assembly of Pakistan from NA-255 (Karachi Central-III), but was unsuccessful. He was defeated by Khalid Maqbool Siddiqui, the Convenor of the Muttahida Qaumi Movement - Pakistan.

General election 2018: NA-255 (Karachi Central-III)
Party	Candidate	Votes	%	±%
MQM-P	Khalid Maqbool Siddiqui	59,807	34.72	
PTI	Mahmood Moulvi	50,352	29.23	
TLP	Muhammad Adeel	21,289	12.36	
MMA	Muhammad Mustaqeem Qureshi	11,323	6.57	
PPP	Zafar Ahmed Siddiqui	8,106	4.71	
PSP	Attaul Mustafa Jameel Rathore	8,099	4.70	
PML(N)	Nasiruddin Mehmood	7,608	4.42	
Others	Others (eight candidates)	5,669	3.29	
Turnout		174,406	37.91	
Total valid votes		172,253	98.77	
Rejected ballots		2,153	1.23	
Majority		9,455	5.49	
Registered electors		460,110		
MQM-P hold				

Note: MQM-P is considered heir apparent to MQM

On 26 May 2021, Imran Khan appointed him as the Special Assistant to the Prime Minister on Maritime Affairs. He remained in this office until 10 April 2022.

Moulvi was elected to the National Assembly of Pakistan from NA-245 (Karachi East-IV) as a candidate of Pakistan Tehreek-e-Insaf in a by-election held on 21 August 2022.

By-election 2022: NA-245 Karachi East-IV
Party	Candidate	Votes	%	±%
PTI	Mahmood Moulvi	29,522	48.93	▲14.97
MQM-P	Farooq Sattar	13,239	21.94	▲0.71
TLP	Ahmed Raza Amjadi	10,055	16.67	▲4.25
Independent	Moeed Anwar	3,497	5.80	
MQM-H	Muhammad Shahid	1,176	1.95	▲0.21
PSP	Syed Hafeezuddin	1,082	1.79	▼1.78
Others	Others (eleven candidates)	1,765	2.93	
Turnout		60,760	11.79	▼25.83
Total valid votes		60,336	99.33	▲1.06
Rejected ballots		424	0.67	▼1.06
Majority		16,282	26.99	▲14.26
Registered electors		515,003		
PTI hold		Swing	N/A	

He was notified by the Election Commission of Pakistan on 2 September 2022, and took the oath of office on 20 February 2023.

On 16 May 2023, Moulvi quit the PTI over the 2023 Pakistani protests that happened in the aftermath of Imran Khan's arrest.

On 23 June 2023, he had been notified as the president of the Istehkam-e-Pakistan Party's Sindh chapter.

== See also ==
- List of members of the 15th National Assembly of Pakistan
