= NA-252 (Karachi-XIV) =

Former constituency of the National Assembly of Pakistan

- Former constituency for the National Assembly of Pakistan
- Region: Karachi District

Former constituency
- Created: 2002
- Abolished: 2018

NA-252 (Karachi-XIV) (Urdu: این اے-۲۵۲، کراچی-۱۴) was a constituency for the National Assembly of Pakistan.

In the 2002 Pakistani general election, Muhammad Hussain Mehanti of the Muttahida Majlis-e-Amal won the seat. The 2008 Pakistani general election saw a shift as Abdul Rasheed Godil of the Muttahida Qaumi Movement – London (MQM) secured a victory with 87,280 votes. Godil also won in the 2013 Pakistani general election, again representing MQM, with 91,339 votes.

The 2018 delimitation process led to the abolition of NA-252, with its area being divided among new constituencies: NA-243 (Karachi East-II), NA-244 (Karachi East-III), and NA-245 (Karachi East-IV), which absorbed the western part of the former NA-252.

== Election 2013 ==
General elections were held on 11 May 2013. Abdul Rasheed Godil of Muttahida Qaumi Movement won by 91,339 votes and became the member of National Assembly.

General election 2013: NA-252 (Karachi-XIV)
Party	Candidate	Votes	%	±%
MQM	Adbul Rashid Godil	91,339	54.59	
PTI	Syed Ali Haider Zaidi	49,622	29.66	
JI	Muhammad Hussain Mehanti	16,342	9.77	
MWM	Muhammad Hussain Karimi	3,566	2.13	
PPP	Syed Asghar Hussain	3,301	1.97	
MDM	Syed Bahroon Shah	2,580	1.54	
Others	Others (seven candidates)	556	0.34	
Turnout		173,594	54.05	
Total valid votes		167,306	96.38	
Rejected ballots		6,288	3.62	
Majority		41,717	24.93	
Registered electors		321,191		

== Election 2008 ==
General elections were held on 18 February 2008. Abdul Rasheed Godil of Muttahida Qaumi Movement won by 87,280 votes.

General election 2008: NA-252 (Karachi-XIV)
Party	Candidate	Votes	%	±%
MQM	Adbul Rashid Godil	87,280	75.71	
PPP	Syed Asghar Hussain	25,337	21.98	
MMA	Hidayat-Ur-Rehman	2,237	1.94	
Others	Others (three candidates)	433	0.37	
Turnout		117,550	42.19	
Total valid votes		115,287	98.08	
Rejected ballots		2,263	1.92	
Majority		61,943	53.73	
Registered electors		278,643		

== Election 2002 ==
General elections were held on 10 October 2002. Muhammad Hussain Mehanti of Muttahida Majlis-e-Amal won by 33,089 votes.

General election 2002: NA-252 (Karachi-XIV)
Party	Candidate	Votes	%	±%
MMA	Muhammad Hussain Mehanti	33,089	45.29	
MQM	Muhammd Intizar Hussain Qureshi	22,862	31.29	
PPP	Najma Saeed Chawala	5,984	8.19	
PML(Q)	Abu Bakar Sheikhani	3,731	5.11	
PTI	Aasia Tariq	3,352	4.59	
PST	Muhammad Fazal Abdul Majeed Noorani	2,612	3.58	
Others	Others (nine candidates)	1,438	1.95	
Turnout		74,019	33.27	
Total valid votes		73,068	98.72	
Rejected ballots		951	1.28	
Majority		10,227	14.00	
Registered electors		222,482		
