= Patel Para =

Neighbourhood in Karachi

Coordinates: 24.885628°N 67.036304°E

Patel Para is a neighbourhood in Jamshed Town, Karachi, Sindh, Pakistan.

Before independence of Pakistan in 1947, the area was home to a significant population of Patel Hindus, along with Parsis and Ismailis. It was known for a unique tradition where, in cases of unclaimed property left by deceased Hindus, the Patel community would automatically assume custodianship. Given their majority presence at the time, the neighborhood came to be known as Patel Para.

Following the partition, nearly all Hindu residents migrated to India in 1947, reshaping the area's demographic landscape. Today, Patel Para is home to a diverse mix of ethnic groups, including Muhajirs, Sindhis, Punjabis, Saraikis, Pashtuns, Balochis, Memons, Bohras, Ismailis and Christians.
