= Pakistan Quarters =

Residential neighbourhood in Karachi, Pakistan

Coordinates: 24°51′N 67°03′E

Pakistan Quarters پاکستان کوارٹرز
- Neighbourhood
- Interactive map of Pakistan Quarters پاکستان کوارٹرز
- Country: Pakistan
- City: Karachi
- District: Karachi East
- Town: Jamshed Town
- Time zone: UTC+5 (PST)
- Postal code: 75300

Pakistan Quarters (Urdu: پاکستان کوارٹرز) is a residential neighborhood in Karachi East district of Karachi, Pakistan. It is administered as part of Jamshed Town,

It is one of the government colonies like Martin Quarters, Clayton Quarters or Jamshed Quarters in Karachi, where housing units are allotted to employees of federal government according to entitlement and transfer of house allowance from their monthly remuneration as rent to the Estate Office, a department in the Ministry of Housing & Works. Retired government servants may, for a specific period, continue to reside in their allotted residence on payment of standard rent in the Estate Office. It is also described that after the independence of Pakistan in 1947, millions of Muslims migrated to Pakistan and faced a housing shortage crisis. In 1953, Prime Minister Muhammad Ali Bogra had initiated housing schemes for the refugees including Pakistan Quarters.

There are several ethnic groups including Muhajirs, Sindhis, Punjabis, Saraikis, Pashtuns, Balochis, Memons, Bohras Ismailis and Christians.

== Claims & hardships ==
Residents of Government colonies, including Pakistan Quarters have been demanding ownership on the basis of longstanding occupation. In 2003, representatives of Government colonies through a press conference at Karachi Press Club condemned the eviction notices for dislodging retired government servants and the heirs of the employees who died during their services or after retirement. They demanded allotment of land of housing units at a reasonable price for the transfer of ownership to occupants, most of them were children of the founders of Pakistan.

Going back to 2008, Housing Ministry has twice moved its summary to the Federal Cabinet for awarding ownership rights to people living in government colonies in Karachi and sector G-6 of Islamabad, which were rejected.

The residents of Government colonies had made their complaints about the encroachments and influence of land mafia for decades. Reportedly not only the land grabbers but also the concerned offices have provided houses on rent and sold an illegally constructed house or shop. According to a surveyor report published in the print media, besides encroachments, detail of residents was depicted as:

- 60% houses/flats are in possession of serving government employees
- 30% belong to retired servants or their families
- 10% by illegal occupants.

The federal government had declared illegal occupants to peoples living in the government quarters at Martin Road, Jehangir Road, F. C. Area, Pakistan Quarters, etc. Many families living in these quarters have been there for decades and they also claim to be legal owners of their houses which were allotted to their ancestors who were founding member of Pakistan. However, Eviction Notices to the families of deceased or retired government servants have been issued since 1980.

=== Political promises ===
Elder residents of government colonies describe that since the period of Zulfiqar Ali Bhutto, various political leaders had, from time to time, assured the residents for award of ownership of allotted housing unite.

=== Ownership certificates ===
The then caretaker minister for Housing & Works, disclosed that the government would allot quarters to its employees on an ownership basis at Pakistan & Martin Quarters Consequently in its first phase, 1,736 eligibility certificates on the basis of long-standing occupancy were distributed to the residents of Martin Quarters, Clyton Quarters, Patel Para in September 2006. Later 394 residents of Pakistan Quarters were also awarded similar certificates. Subsequently Federal Housing Minister stated that eligibility certificates issued to the residents of government colonies had no legal value and could be withdrawn.

In 2008, the then Secretary of Ministry of Housing & Works stated that a committee was set up by the former Prime Minister for deliberation of a proposal to award the ownership eligibility certificates to the residents of government quarters on the basis of their long stay in the housing units of government colonies in Karachi and Islamabad. During 2006, Syed Safwanullah, the Federal Minister of Housing and Works issued the proposed certificates at his discretion without waiting for the approval of the policy.

== Petition in the Supreme Court of Pakistan ==
Per Resolution: 2004/28 of High Commission for Human Rights Forced eviction is prohibited. In response to eviction notices, affected residents living in the government colonies filed a petition in the Supreme Court of Pakistan, but could not satisfy the court.

In July-2018 the Supreme Court of Pakistan ordered to get the housing units situated in Pakistan Quarters, Martin Quarters, Jamshed Quarters, Clayton Quarters, Federal Capital Area, and other colonies of Karachi evacuated within 10 days from the alleged illegal occupants.

Reportedly family members living in the Pakistan Quarters and other government colonies after retirement or death of a government servant whom the quarter was allotted, protested outside Supreme Court Karachi Registry against the issued verdict.

=== Police Operation ===
On 24 October-2018, 16 people were injured and dozens were arrested during a protest against the operation to evict the Pakistan Quarters longstanding residents. Death of one woman was also reported when Police used baton-charge and fired tear gas to disperse the mob. Consequently, Chief Justice of Pakistan ordered to put a hold on the evacuation process and pended it for a period of three months. Operation was condemned by leaders of different political parties of Pakistan, including PTI local representatives. Members of different Political parties in Karachi, including Jamaat-i-Islami (JI) and Pak Sarzameen Party (PSP) disliked the police action in Pakistan Quarters on 24 October 2018 and appealed the federal government to resolve the very old issue by granting ownership rights to the residents of the government quarters. However, mixed reaction was noticed at the national level.

Chief Minister of Sindh ordered immediate withdrawal of police from the area and expressed his displeasure over the police action in Pakistan Quarters. He further added that he would take-up the issue with the provincial administration and Law Department, and also approach the Supreme Court if necessary with a view to arrive at a resolution on "humanitarian grounds"

== See also ==
Patel Para
