= Muhammad Daniyal =

Pakistani politician

Muhammad Daniyal is a Pakistani politician who has been a Member of the Provincial Assembly of Sindh since 2024.

== Political career ==
He was elected to the 16th Provincial Assembly of Sindh as a candidate of the Muttahida Qaumi Movement – Pakistan from constituency PS-104 Karachi East-VIII in the 2024 Pakistani general election.
