= Moeed Anwar =

Pakistani politician

Chairman of District Municipal Corporation (DMC) East, Karachi
- In office 2016–2020

Personal details
- Born: Karachi, Pakistan
- Party: Muttahida Qaumi Movement – Pakistan
- Occupation: Politician

Moeed Anwar is a Pakistani politician who has been a Member of the Provincial Assembly of Sindh since 2024.

== Political career ==
He was elected to the 16th Provincial Assembly of Sindh as a candidate of the Muttahida Qaumi Movement – Pakistan from Constituency PS-101 Karachi East-V in the 2024 Pakistani general election.
