= Usmanabad =

Neighborhood of Karachi, Pakistan

Coordinates: 24°52′N 67°01′E

Usmanabad or Osmanabad (Urdu: عثمان آباد) is a neighborhood in Karachi, Pakistan, that is within Malir District.

There are several ethnic groups in Usmanabad including Muhajirs, Sindhis, Punjabis, Kashmiris, Seraikis, Pakhtuns, Balochis, Memons, Bohras, Ismailis and Christians.

== See also ==
- Haji Camp
