= Cincinnatus Town =

Former neighbourhood in Karachi

Cincinnatus Town was a former Christian neighborhood in Jamshed Town in Karachi, Sindh, Pakistan.

== The planners ==
Pedro D'Souza and his colleague George Britto, the town planners designed Cincinnatus Town, with its front on Britto Road and the back on Seth Mahomed Ali Habib Road.

D'Souza was a brilliant engineer who studied in St. Xavier's College in Bombay. He died on 31 December 1912. He was buried in the Christian Cemetery Gora Kabristan in Karachi. The city honoured the planners by naming Pedro D'Souza road and Britto Road after them.

== The town ==
A description of the origin and history of Cincinnatus Town is cited in the book The Origin and Evolution of St. Lawrence's Parish.

The town was designed with a single lane road linking the new township to the Ismaili Jamaat Khana in Lea Market in 1880. D’Souza structured the colony with St Lawrence's Church at its centre.

The town was named Cincinnatus, after the city of Cincinnati, in Ohio, USA, that as of 2012 had a large Portuguese population migrated from India and Pakistan, Mozambique and Angola. Although another source claims it was named after Goan administrator and politician Cincinatus Fabian D’Abreo.

The hard work and meticulous planning of D'Souza and Britto of Cincinnatus town has since the independence of Pakistan in 1947, benefited not just the Goans, but Khojas, Ismailis and Memons as well. As of 2013, Cincinnatus Town remains mainly in the archives and the memories of its former residents. It was absorbed into a larger settlement and named Garden East.

== School ==
- Jufelhurst School
