= December 2021 Karachi explosion =

Gas explosion in Sindh, Pakistan

2021 Karachi explosion
- Date: 18 December 2021
- Location: Karachi, Sindh, Pakistan; 24°53′24.0″N 66°59′1.4″E
- Cause: Gas leak
- Deaths: 17
- Injuries: 16

On 18 December 2021, an explosion at a bank branch in the Sher Shah area of Karachi, Sindh, Pakistan, killed 17 people and injured at least 16 others.

== Explosion ==
A gas leak exploded near Paracha Chowk in the Sher Shah area of Karachi, killing 14 people and injuring several others, including the father of Alamgir Khan, a member of the National Assembly. The blast destroyed a private bank building on the drain, damaged vehicles, and according to an initial report from the bomb disposal squad, the blast was caused by a gas leak in the sewer line.

Murtaza Wahab, the administrator of Karachi issued a statement on Twitter that initially 15 people had died and 16 were injured and brought to hospital. Senior policeman Sarfaraz Nawaz Shaikh confirmed that 16 people had been injured. The number of people dead was later raised to 17 after 5 of the victims died in the hospital.

== Response ==
Sindh Chief Minister Murad Ali Shah has directed the Commissioner of Karachi, including police officers to conduct an inquiry.

Habib Bank, which was affected by the blast, issued a statement on Twitter offering its sympathies to the families of the victims.
