= P.E.C.H.S Block 2 =

Coordinates: 24.8694°N 67.0613°E

- Neighbourhood
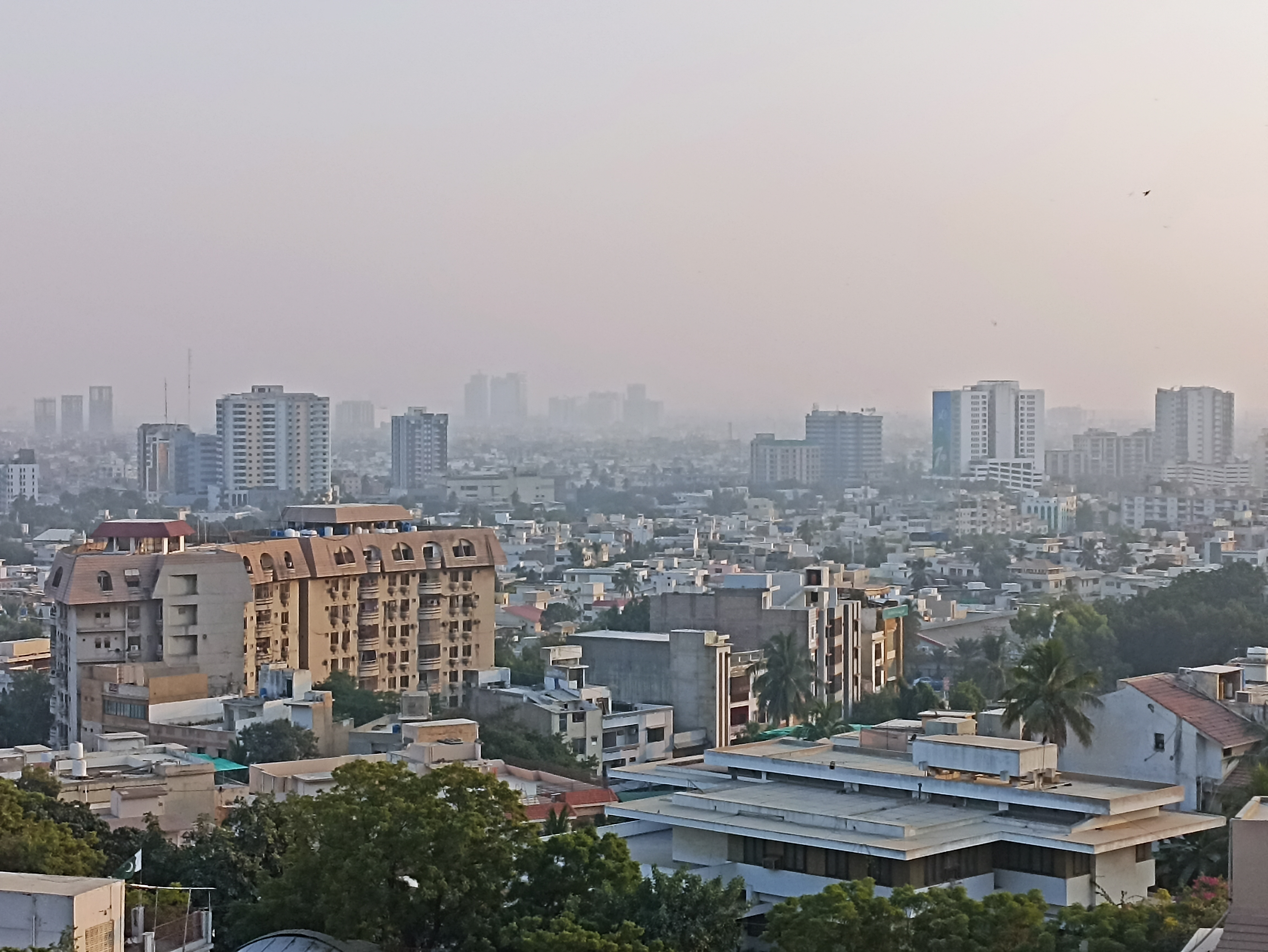
- Interactive map of P.E.C.H.S Block 2
- Country: Pakistan
- City: Karachi
- District: Karachi East
- Time zone: UTC+5 (PST)
  - Summer (DST): (GMT +5)
- Postal code: 75300

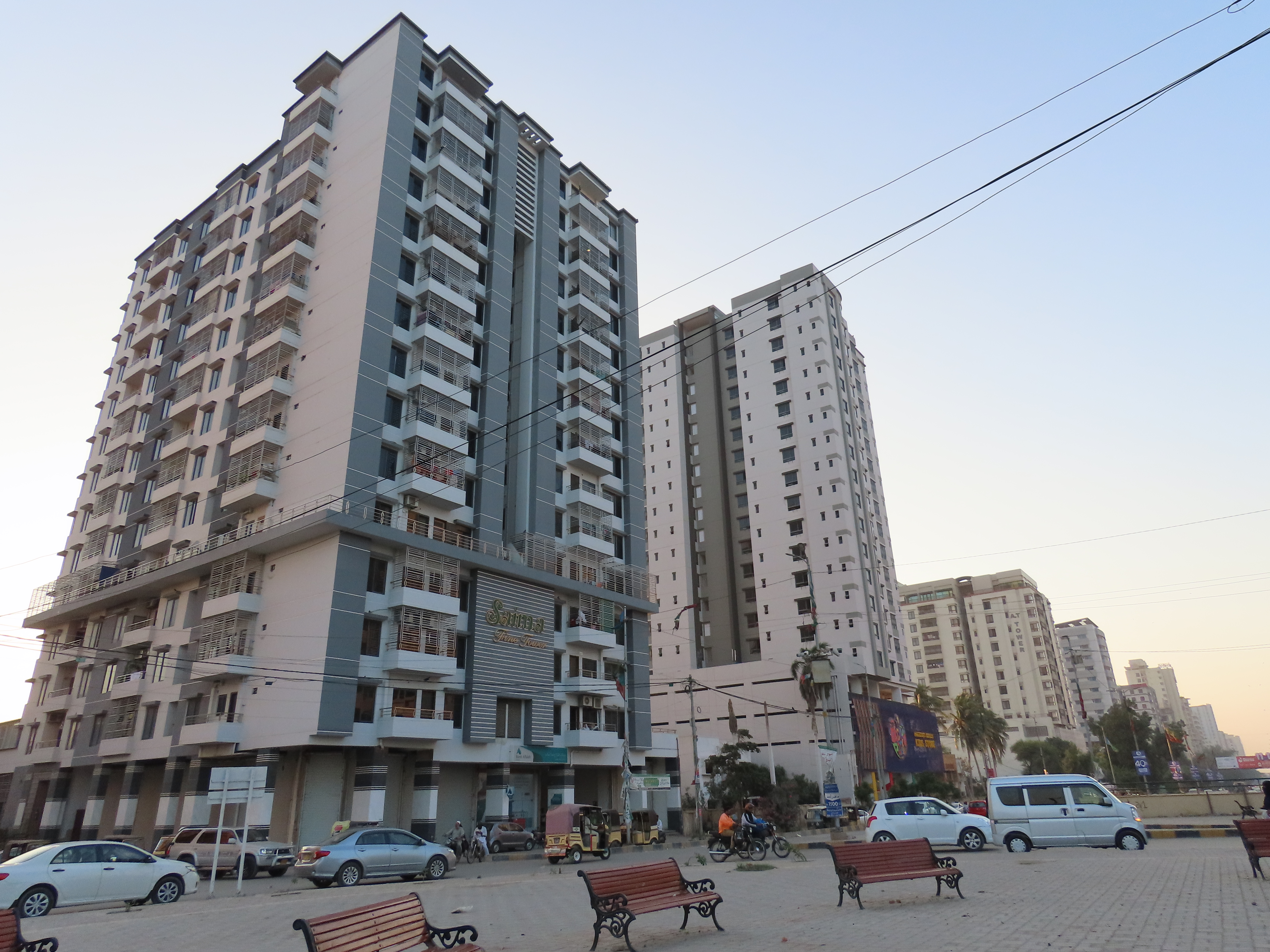
PECHS Buildings

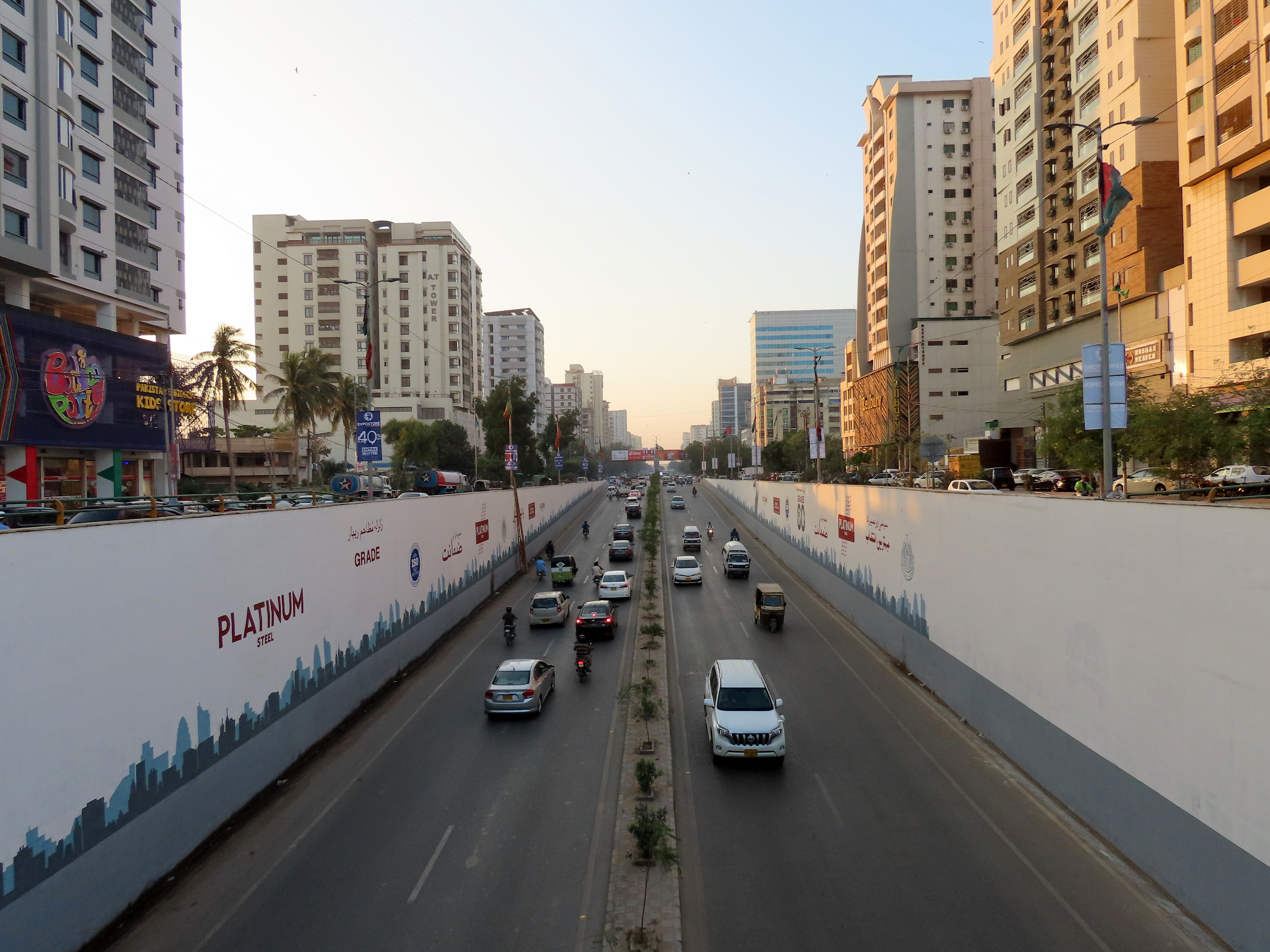
Umar Shareef Underpass in PECHS.

Pakistan Employees Cooperative Housing Society (PECHS), Block 2 (biggest block of PECHS) is a neighborhood in Karachi East district of Karachi, Pakistan. It was founded by Mehmood Ahmad Nizami in 1950, three years after Pakistan was founded by Quaid-e-Azam Mohammad Ali Jinnah. Nizami lived in the same society and also created the first house in PECHS where some of his descendants now live. It is considered a historical site. PECHS was previously administered as part of Jamshed Town, which was disbanded in 2011.

There are several ethnic groups including Muhajirs, Sindhis, Baltis, Punjabis, Christians, Kashmiris, Seraikis, Pakhtuns, Balochis, Memons, Bohras and Ismailis.

Over 98 percent of the population is Muslim with small Christian, Hindu, and other minorities.

== See also ==
- P.E.C.H.S Block 6
- S.M.C.H.S Block B
