= Nursery, Karachi =

Residential neighborhood locality in Karachi, Pakistan

Nursery (Urdu: نرسرى) is a residential area of Karachi, Sindh, Pakistan. Situated on the main city road Shahrah-e-Faisal, it is part of the PECHS neighborhood within Jamshed Town.
