= Baloch Colony =

Neighbourhood of Jamshed Town

Coordinates: 24°51′N 67°03′E

Baloch Colony (Urdu: بلوچ کالونی) is one of the neighbourhoods of Jamshed Town in Karachi, Sindh, Pakistan.

Several ethnic groups reside here, including Muhajirs, Punjabis, Sindhis, Kashmiris, Seraikis, Pakhtuns, Balochis, Memons, Bohras Ismailis as well as a Christian population comprising a mix of ethnicities.

The vast majority belongs to Sunni Barelvi group of population.
