= Azam Basti =

Residential neighborhood of Karachi, Pakistan

Coordinates: 24°51′N 67°04′E

Azam Basti اعظم بستی
- Neighbourhood
- Interactive map of Azam Basti اعظم بستی
- Country: Pakistan
- City: Karachi
- District: Karachi East
- Time zone: UTC+5 (PST)
- Postal code: 07586

Azam Basti (Urdu: اعظم بستی) is a neighborhood in Karachi East district of Karachi, Pakistan. It was previously administered as part of Chanasar Town, which was disbanded in 2011.

There are several ethnic groups in Azam Basti including Muhajirs, Punjabis, Sindhis, Kashmiris, Seraikis, Pakhtuns, Balochis, Memons, Bohras, Ismailis. The population of Jamshed Town is estimated to be nearly one million.

Over 80% of the population is Christian in Azam Basti, containing a major Christian population represented by the Catholic parish of St Paul.
