= Garden West =

Residential neighborhood locality in Karachi, Pakistan

Garden West باغ مغرب
- Municipality
- Interactive map of Garden West
- Coordinates: 24.877916°N 67.019527°E
- Country: Pakistan
- Province: Sindh
- City: Karachi

Garden West is a residential neighbourhood in Karachi, Sindh, Pakistan, situated to the west of the Karachi Zoo. It is among the city's oldest settlements and has been recognised as a high tax-contributing locality. The residential area extends from the southwest to the northeast, positioned between the Lyari River and Nishtar Road.

The several ethnic groups residing in Saddar Town include the Muhajirs, Sindhis, Punjabis, Kashmiris, Seraikis, Pakhtuns, Balochs, Memons, Bohras and Ismailis.

== See also ==
- Garden East
- Saddar Town
- Karachi
