= P.E.C.H.S Block 6 =

- Neighbourhood
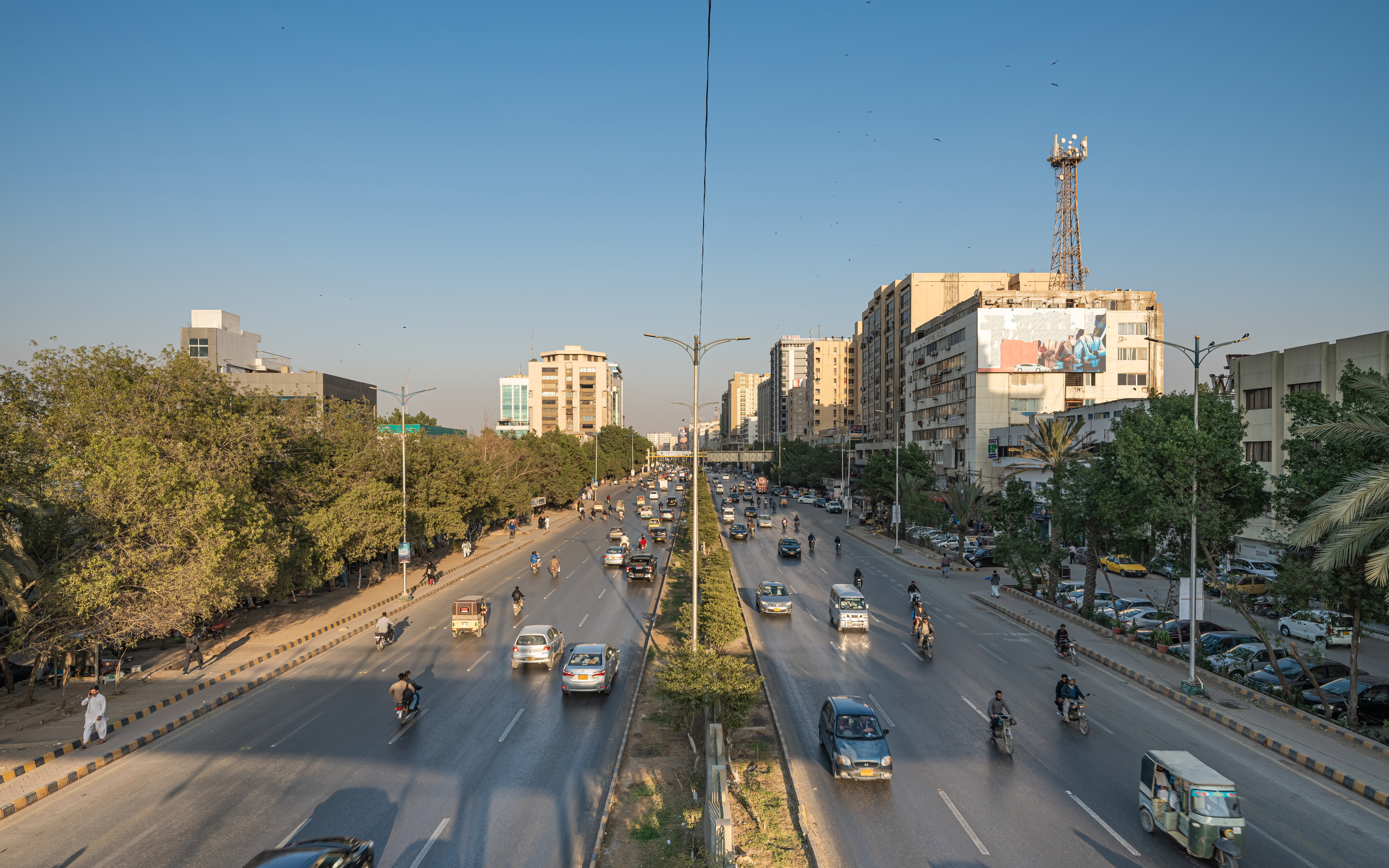
- Country: Pakistan
- City: Karachi
- District: Karachi East
- Time zone: UTC+5 (PST)
- Postal code: 75300

Pakistan Employees Cooperative Housing Society (PECHS), Block 6 is a neighborhood in Karachi East district of Karachi, Pakistan. It was founded by Mehmood Ahmad Nizami in the year 1950, three years after Pakistan was founded by Quaid-e-Azam Mohammad Ali Jinnah. Nizami lived in the same society and also created the first house in PECHS, Block II where some of his descendants now live. It was previously administered as part of Jamshed Town, which was disbanded in 2011.

There are several ethnic groups including Urdu Speaking, Baltis, Punjabis, Sindhis, Christians, Kashmiris, Seraikis, Pakhtuns, Balochis, Memons, Bohras and Ismailis.

Over 98 percent of the population is Muslim with small Christian, Hindu, and other minorities.

== See also ==
- P.E.C.H.S Block 2
- S.M.C.H.S Block B
