= Central Jacob Lines =

Jacob Lines جیکب لائن
- Neighbourhood
- Country: Pakistan
- City: Karachi
- District: Karachi East
- Time zone: UTC+5 (PKT)
- Postal code: 75300

Central Jacob Lines (Urdu: جیکب لائن) is a neighborhood in Karachi East district of Karachi, Pakistan. It was previously administered as part of Jamshed Town, which was disbanded In 2011. It is named after General John Jacob.
