= Manzoor Colony =

Manzoor Colony منظور کالونی
- Neighbourhood
- Country: Pakistan
- City: Karachi
- District: Karachi East
- Country: Pakistan
- Time zone: UTC+5 (PST)
- Postal code: 75300

Manzoor Colony (Urdu: منظور کالونی) is a neighborhood in Karachi East district of Karachi, Pakistan. It was previously administered as part of Jamshed Town, which was disbanded in 2011.

There are several ethnic groups in Manzoor Colony and they include Muhajirs, Baltis, Punjabis, Sindhis, Kashmiris, Seraikis, Pakhtuns, Hazaras, Memons, Bohras, Ismailis. The nine sectors in Manzoor Colony are from sector A through sector I. Over 95% of the population is Muslims while there is also a small Christians and little Hindu population. The population of Jamshed Town is estimated to be nearly one million.

== History ==
Plots are issued in Manzoor colony by KMC to resettle the people displaced from Kala Pul Area on Rashan Card scheme of that time. Manzoor Colony was once a jungle where animals used to wander but first human settlements by Muazzam Ud Din Khan Niazi Khizar Khel from Khaglan Wala, Isakhel, Mianwali and Haji Muhammad Luqman Siddiqui in the 1960s made this area livable. It was once called Niazi Colony with a Chowk near Great Mosque Called Niazi Chowk but later name was changed after death of Muazzam ud Din Khan Niazi Khizar Khel and his descendants moved to Khanewal, Punjab in 1990.

== Hamara Akhbar Manzoor Colony ==
- Hamara Akhbar Manzoor Colony.
