= Ferozabad, Karachi =

Coordinates: 24°51′N 67°03′E

Firozabad (فیروز آباد) is one of the neighbourhoods of Jamshed Town in Karachi, Sindh, Pakistan.

The several ethnic groups residing in this area include Muhajirs, Punjabis, Sindhis, Kashmiris, Seraikis, Pakhtuns, Balochis, Memons, Bohras Ismailis and Christians.
