= Garden East =

Residential neighbourhood in Karachi, Pakistan

Coordinates: 24°53′N 67°02′E

Garden East گارڈن ایسٹ
- Neighbourhood
- Interactive map of Garden East گارڈن ایسٹ
- Country: Pakistan
- City: Karachi-75550
- District: Karachi East
- Time zone: UTC+5 (PST)
- Postal code: 75550
- Town: Jamshed Town, Karachi

Karachi Zoo

Garden East (Urdu: گارڈن ایسٹ) is a neighbourhood in Karachi East district of Karachi, Pakistan. It is administered as part of Jamshed Town, which was disbanded in 2011 but later restored in early 2022.

This area surrounds the Karachi Zoological Gardens, hence it is popularly known as Gardens.

The area has a large presence of Ismaili Muslims due to their Jama'at Khana (prayer hall) being located there.

The area was predominantly residential but over the last few years, smaller commercial areas have grown to cater to the needs of the residents.

Many restaurants can be found in Big Bite area of the neighbourhood.

Cincinnatus Town was developed as a neighbourhood for Christians in the 1930s. It was later absorbed into a larger settlement and named Garden East.
