= Jamshed Quarters =

Residential neighborhood in Karachi, Pakistan

Jamshed Quarters محله جمشید جمشید کوارٹرز
- Neighbourhood
- Country: Pakistan
- Province: Sindh
- City: Karachi
- District: Karachi East
- Time zone: UTC+5 (PST)
- Postal code: 75300

Qaid-e-Azam tomb in Jamshed Quarters

Jamshed Quarters (Urdu: جمشید کوارٹرز) is a residential neighborhood in the Karachi East district of Karachi, Pakistan. It is administered as part of Jamshed Town, which was disbanded in 2011 before being restored in early 2022. To the northwest is Liaquatabad Town across the Lyari River, while to the east is Gulshan Town and to the southeast is Korangi Town across the Malir River. Jamshed Town is bordered by Karachi Cantonment and Clifton Cantonment to the west.

== Demography ==
Several ethnic groups reside in Jamshed Quarters including Muhajirs, Sindhis, Punjabis, Saraikis, Pashtuns, Balochis, Memons, Bohras, Kutchi, Ismailis, with a minority but significant Christian population comprising various ethnicities. The former religious make-up of the population here included Muslims, Hindus, Christians, Parsis and Jews.

Jamshed Quarters has a big Imam Bargah and the Masjid Jamia Binoria.

== History ==
Jamshed Quarters was developed by Jamshed Nusserwanjee Mehta in 1922 and was named after him. In the same year 1922, he was elected president of the Karachi Municipality, an office he occupied till October 1932. He was born in 1886 in Karachi and died on 8 August 1952.

The federal government introduced local government reforms in the year 2000, which eliminated the previous third tier of government (administrative divisions) and raised the fourth tier (districts) to become the new third tier. The effect in Karachi was the dissolution of the former Karachi Division and the merger of its five districts into a new Karachi City-District with 26 autonomous constituent towns including Jamshed Town. As of the 2024 Pakistan General Elections, the PS-105 constituency is represented by Pakistan Peoples Party's Saeed Ghani.

== See also ==
- Karachi Local Government
- Panchmukhi Hanuman Temple
