= Iftikhar =

Iftikhar or Iftekhar is masculine given name of Arabic origin.

== Notable people with the name ==
=== Iftekhar ===
- Iftekhar (1920–1995), Indian actor who mainly worked in Hindi films
- Iftekhar Anis, Bangladeshi general
- Iftekhar Ahmed Chowdhury, Bangladeshi diplomat
- Iftekhar Uddin Chowdhury (born 1955), Bangladeshi academic
- Iftekhar Hasan, American economist and finance scholar
- Iftekhar Nayem (born 1988), Bangladeshi cricketer
- Iftekhar Rafsan (born 1997), Bangladeshi YouTube personality, model and actor
- Iftekhar Sajjad (born 1991), Bangladeshi cricketer
- Mosaddek Iftekhar (born 1989), Bangladeshi cricketer

=== Iftikhar ===
==== First or middle name ====
- Iftikhar Ahmad (barrister) (born 1949), Pakistani barrister, political activist and military officer
- Iftikhar Ahmad (political activist) (born 1950), Pakistani political activist
- Iftikhar Ahmed (cricketer) (born 1990), Pakistani cricketer
- Iftikhar Ahmed (Faisalabad cricketer) (born 1984), Pakistani cricketer
- Iftikhar Ahmed (Kalat cricketer), Pakistani cricketer who played for Kalat in the 1960s
- Malik Iftikhar Ahmed, Pakistani politician
- Iftikhar Hussain Akhtar (1865–1927), known as Muztar Khairabadi, Indian Urdu poet
- Iftikhar Alam, Pakistani politician
- Iftikhar Alam Khan (born 1938), Indian museologist
- Iftikhar Ali (born 1957), Pakistani cricket umpire
- Iftikhar Ali Mushwani, Pakistani politician
- Iftikhar Anjum (born 1980), Pakistani cricketer
- Iftikhar Hussain Ansari (1942–2014), Kashmiri Shia cleric, politician and businessman
- Iftikhar Arif (born 1944), Pakistani poet
- Iftikhar A. Ayaz, Tuvaluan diplomat
- Syed Iftikhar Bokhari (1935–2021), Pakistani politician and cricketer
- Iftikhar Chaudhry (born 1948), Pakistani judge
- Arsalan Iftikhar Chaudhry (born 1976), Pakistani businessman and medical doctor
- Iftikhar Cheema (1939–2025), Pakistani politician
- Iftikhar al-Dawla, Fatimid governor of Jerusalem during the siege of 1099
- Iftikhar Durrani (born 1969), Pakistani politician
- Chaudhry Iftikhar Hussain (judge) (1946–2015), Pakistani judge
- Chaudhry Iftikhar Hussain (politician), Pakistani politician
- Mian Iftikhar Hussain (born 1958), Pakistani politician
- Syed Iftikhar Hussain Gillani (born 1940), Pakistani politician
- Iftikhar Ullah Jan, Pakistani politician
- Iftikhar M. Kadri (born 1929), Indian architect and civil engineer
- Iftikhar-ul-Hasan Kandhlawi (1922–2019), Indian Islamic scholar and preacher
- Iftikhar Khan (1909–1949), Pakistani general
- Iftikhar Khan (governor), Mughal governor of the Subah of Kashmir from 1671 to 1675
- Iftikhar Khan Janjua (died 1971), Pakistani general
- Iftikhar Khan Jhagra (died 2017), Pakistani politician
- Iftikhar Ali Khan (general) (1941–2009), Pakistani general
- Iftikhar Ali Khan Pataudi (1910–1952), Indian prince and cricket player
- Iftikhar Ali Khan of Malerkotla (1904–1982), Nawab of Malerkotla
- Iftikhar Ahmed Khan Babar, Pakistani politician
- Iftikhar Ahmad Khan Jadoon, Pakistani politician
- Iftikhar Hussain Khan Mamdot (1906–1969), Pakistani politician and independence activist
- Sardar Iftikhar Ahmed Khan, Pakistani politician
- Iftikhar Malik (born 1949), Pakistani cricketer
- Iftikhar Mohmand, Pakistani politician
- Chaudhry Iftikhar Nazir (born 1956), Pakistani politician
- Iftikhar Qaisar (1956–2017), Pakistani actor, poet, and drama writer
- Iftikhar Randhawa (born 1972), Pakistani Politician
- Iftikhar Shah (born 1940), Pakistani sprinter
- Iftikhar Ahmed Shah (1928–2020), Pakistani swimmer
- Iftikhar Hussain Shah (1949–2020), Pakistani politician
- Iftikhar Ahmed Sirohey (1935–2025), Pakistani admiral
- Iftikhar Ahmed Syed (born 1952), Pakistani field hockey player
- Iftikhar Thakur (born 1958), Pakistani comedian and actor
- Iftikhar al-Tujjar (1912–1977), Iranian female jurisprudent and theologian
- Shahzada Iftikhar Uddin (born 1969), Pakistani politician
- Syed Iftikhar Ul Hassan (1942–2020), Pakistani politician
- Chaudhary Iftikhar Ahmed Warsi (born 1954), Pakistani politician

==== Last name ====
- Arsalan Iftikhar (born 1977), American lawyer and author
- Atiya Iftikhar, Pakistani politician
- Babar Iftikhar, Pakistani general
- Faiza Iftikhar, Pakistani writer, author, and screenwriter
- Khawaja Iftikhar, Pakistani tennis player
- Madiha Iftikhar (born 1985) is a Pakistani actress and model
- Sadiq Iftikhar, Pakistani politician
- Saira Iftikhar, Pakistani politician
- Shadab Iftikhar, English football manager
- Syeda Nosheen Iftikhar, Pakistani politician
- Uzma Iftikhar (born 1987), Pakistani-American cricketer
