= Abidabad =

Residential neighbourhood in Baldia Town, Karachi, Pakistan

Coordinates: 24°53′N 67°05′E

Abidabad (Urdu: عابد آباد) is a residential neighbourhood in Baldia Town municipality of Karachi, Pakistan.

Crime rate against the political activists is high here; in August, 2023, an activist of Pakistan People's Party sitting outside his home in Abidabad was assassinated in a targeted attack by assailants on a motorbike.

== Other neighbourhoods of Baldia Town ==
- Afridi Colony
- Gulshan-e-Ghazi
- Islamnagar
- Ittehad Town
- Muhajir Camp
- Muslim Mujahid Colony
- Nai Abadi
- Naval Colony
- Rasheedabad
- Saeedabad
- Bismillah Chowk
- Delhi Colony
- Gujrat Colony
- Kokan Colony
- Mujahid Colony
