= Afridi Colony =

Residential neighbourhood in Baldia Town, Karachi, Pakistan

Coordinates: 24°53′N 67°05′E

Afridi Colony (Urdu: آفریدی کالونی)) is a residential neighbourhood in the Baldia Town municipality of Karachi Pakistan.

== Other neighbourhoods of Baldia Town ==
- Abidabad
- Gulshan-e-Ghazi
- Islamnagar
- Ittehad Town
- Muhajir Camp
- Muslim Mujahid Colony
- Nai Abadi
- Naval Colony
- Rasheedabad
- Saeedabad
- Bismillah Chowk
- Delhi Colony
- Gujrat Colony
- Kokan Colony

== See also ==
- City District Government
- Karachi
- Lahore
- Veraval Turk Jamaat
