= Baldia Town =

Residential town within the city of Karachi, Pakistan

Coordinates: 24°55′28″N 66°58′25″E

Baldia Town بلدیہ ٹاؤن
- Constituent Town of Karachi
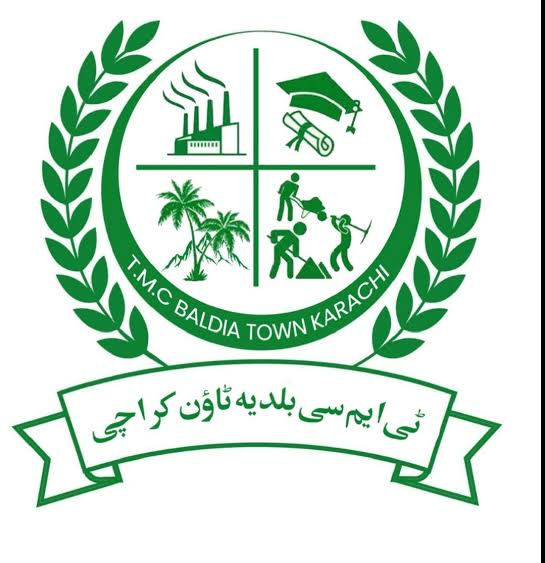
- Seal

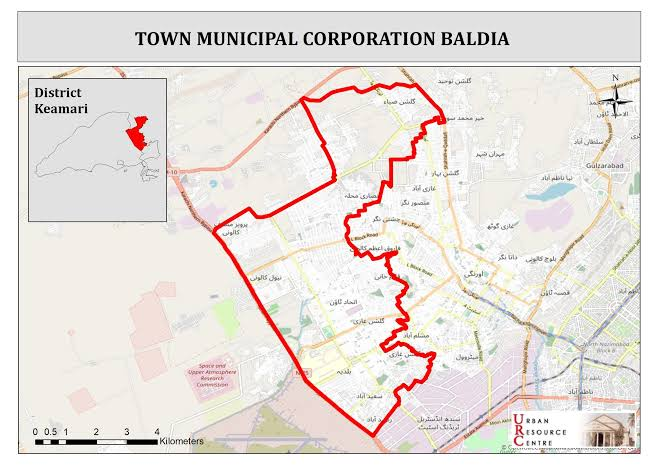
- Baldia Town Map
- Town Chairman: Abdul Karim Askani
- District: Keamari District (since 2020)
- Division: Karachi Division
- Province: Sindh
- Country: Pakistan
- Established: 2001; 25 years ago (CDGK)
- Abolished: 2011; 15 years ago
- Restored: 2015; 11 years ago
- Union Committees in Town Municipal Corporation: 13: Methan Ittehad Town Shaheed Nawab Khan Gulshan-e-Ghazi Islam Nagar Jam Nagar Madina Colony Saeedabad Nai Abadi Shaheed Eidi Ameen New Saeedabad Naval Colony Yousuf Goth

Government
  - Type: Government of Karachi
  - Constituency: NA-242 Karachi Keamari-I
  - National Assembly Member: Syed Mustafa Kamal (Muttahida Qaumi Movement)

Area
  - Total: 34 km^{2} (13 sq mi)
- Elevation: 38 m (125 ft)
- Highest elevation: 124 m (407 ft)
- Lowest elevation: 3 m (9.8 ft)

Population (2023 Pakistani census)
  - Total: 948,399
  - Density: 27,899.91/km^{2} (72,260.4/sq mi)
- Demonym: Karachiite
- Time zone: UTC+05:00 (PKT)
  - Summer (DST): DST is not observed
- ZIP Code: 75760
- NWD (area) code: 021
- ISO 3166 code: PK-SD

Baldia Town (Urdu: بلدیہ ٹاؤن) is an administrative sub-division within Keamari District of Karachi Division in Sindh Province of Pakistan. Baldia Town lies in the western part of the city with a population of 948,399 as of the 2023 Pakistani census.

In 2020, Kemari District was carved out of Karachi West District, and Baldia Town ended up being part of Kemari District.

== Town Municipal Committee ==
The Town Municipal Committee Baldia (TMC Baldia) is a local government body in Karachi, Pakistan, responsible for providing municipal services within its designated jurisdiction. It is one of the 26 Town Municipal Corporations established in Karachi under the Sindh Local Government Act, 2021.

The creation of the Town Municipal Committee Baldia is part of a restructuring of Karachi's local government system. The Sindh government replaced the previous seven District Municipal Corporations (DMCs) with 26 towns, each with its own municipal committee. Baldia Town is one of three towns located within the Keamari District, alongside Mauripur Town and Moriro Mirbahar Town.

== Demographics ==
There are several ethnic groups in Baldia sub-division. Total population of Baldia Sub-Division is 948,399 consists of Males 498,073 and females 450,223 as of 2023 Pakistani census.

Languages

Languages of Baldia Sub-Division (2023 census)
1. Pashto (30.1%)
2. Urdu (29.9%)
3. Punjabi (12.7%)
4. Hindko (11.1%)
5. Balochi (5.42%)
6. Sindhi (5.04%)
7. Saraiki (2.45%)
8. others (3.29%)

Language	Rank	2023 census	Speakers
Pashto	1	30.11%	285,619
Urdu	2	29.92%	283,833
Punjabi	3	12.68%	120,331
Hindko	4	11.05%	104800
Balochi	5	5.42%	51,447
Sindhi	6	5.04%	47,801
Saraiki	7	2.45%	23,252
Kashmiri	8	0.36%	3,451
Kohistani	9	0.30%	2,866
Others	10	2.63%	24,999
All	11	100%	948,399

Religions

There are 931,219 Muslims, 14,327 Christians, 2,432 Hindus, 55 Ahmadiyya, 10 scheduled castes, 53 Sikhs, 44 Parsis and 259 others of total population 948,399 of Baldia sub-division.

Religions in Baldia sub-division (2023)
Religion	Percent
Islam	98.18%
Christianity	1.51%
Hinduism	0.25%
Other	0.05%

== Union Committees ==
Baldia Town 13 Union Committees of Baldia in Town Municipal Corporation

Sub Sr Number	Number of Union Committee (Baldia)	Name of UC in Town Municipal Corporation
1	UC#01	Methan
2	UC#02	Ittehad Town
3	UC#03	Shaheed Nawab Khan
4	UC#04	Gulshan-e-Ghazi
5	UC#05	Islam Nagar
6	UC#06	Jam Nagar
7	UC#07	Madina Colony
8	UC#08	Saeedabad
9	UC#09	Nai Abadi
10	UC#10	Shaheed Eidi Ameen
11	UC#11	New Saeedabad
12	UC#12	Naval Colony
13	UC#13	Yousuf Goth

== Location ==
It was bordered by SITE Town and Orangi to the east and by Kiamari Town to the north and west, with most of the western boundary formed by part of the RCD Highway.

== Neighbourhoods ==
- Abidabad
- Afridi Colony
- Baldia Colony
- Delhi Colony
- Dhoraji Colony
- Gujrat Colony
- Gulshan-e-Ghazi
- Islamnagar
- Ittehad Town
- Kokan Colony
- Muhajir Camp
- Muslim Mujahid Colony
- Nai Abadi
- Naval Colony
- Rasheedabad
- Saeedabad

== Constituency ==
- NA-242 Karachi Keamari-I

== See also ==
- Baldia railway station
- 2012 Pakistan factory fires#Karachi Baldia Town factory
