= Iftikhar Randhawa =

Pakistani Politician

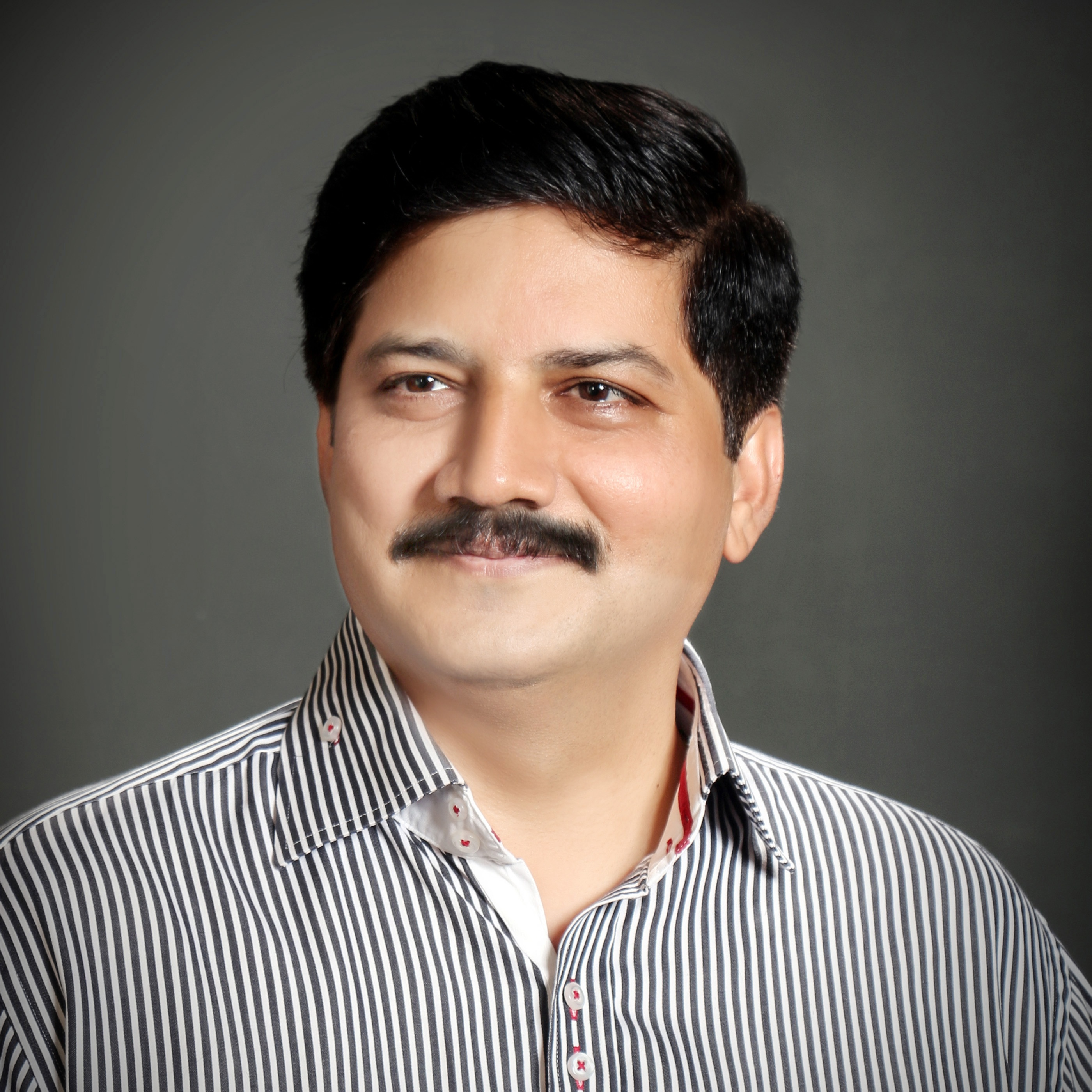
- Born: Khanewal, Punjab, Pakistan
- Political party: MQM-P (2023-present)
- Other political affiliations: PSP (2016-2023); MQM-L (1992-2016)
- Spouse: Shazia Imam
- Father: Chaudhry Mahmood Randhawa

Iftikhar Akbar Randhawa (Urdu: افتخاراکبر رندھاوا) (born 1 January 1972) is a Pakistani Politician. He was senior leader of Muttahida Quami Movement (MQM) until he joined Pak Sarzameen Party.

== Political career ==
=== Working for MQM ===
In 1992, Iftikhar started his political career joining MQM (Muhajir Qaumi Movement). In 1997, MQM removed Muhajir from their name replacing it with Muttahida. Iftikhar also became member of the Provincial Assembly of Sindh. He was elected as provincial organizer of and was member of Central Executive Committee of MQM. Iftikhar was also a part of MQM's Rabita Committee for 10 years. He then left Pakistan and stayed in Australia.

=== Arrests ===
==== 1994 Arrest ====
In 1994 Iftikhar Randhawa was arrested in Jampur, DG Khan during a protest against human rights violation in Karachi. And released in few days. During those days he was working as a Provincial Organizing Committee, MQM Punjab.

==== 1995 Arrest ====
In June 1995 Iftikhar Randhawa was arrested from Multan by Law Enforcement Agencies Pakistan because of supporting and Working as Provincial President of Muttahida Qaumi Movement in Punjab. Very next day he was transferred to Islamabad Safe Houses. He was released after spending a year in solitary confinement.

=== Books ===
==== Riyasti Dehshat Gardi ====
Iftikhar Randhawa wrote his first book "Riyasti Dehshat Gardi" in 1997. This Book is Autobiography of the organizer of Punjab faction of MQM political party from Pakistan chiefly highlighting state violence.

==== Mein Gaddar Nhi Hon ====
"Mein Gaddar Nhi Hon" was written about MQM leader and founder Altaf Hussain's biography.

==== Shaur Ki Dastak ====
This book is a collection of articles published in different national and international newspaper about knowledge of different aspect of life.

=== Joining PSP ===
In April 2016, Iftikhar joined Mustafa Kamal and Anis Kaimkhani's new party Pak Sarzameen Party. He was elected as the Vice Chairman of PSP. In 2018, he was from NA-252 (Karachi West 5) and fought in the 2018 Pakistan general elections. However he couldn't win his seat in the National Assembly of Pakistan.

In 2019, NAB (National Accountability Bureau) issued notice to Randhawa for sale of KFF properties.
