= Abdul Qadir Patel =

Pakistani politician

Abdul Qadir Patel عبدالقادر پٹیل

Member of the National Assembly of Pakistan
- Incumbent
- Assumed office 29 February 2024
- Constituency: NA-243 Karachi Keamari-II

Ministry of National Health Services, Regulation and Coordination
- In office 19 April 2022 – 10 August 2023
- President: Arif Alvi
- Prime Minister: Shehbaz Sharif
- Preceded by: Faisal Sultan
- Succeeded by: Syed Mustafa Kamal
- Constituency: NA-243 Karachi Keamari-II

Member of the National Assembly of Pakistan
- In office 13 August 2018 – 10 August 2023
- Preceded by: Salman Mujahid Baloch
- Succeeded by: Post abolished
- Constituency: NA-243 Karachi Keamari-II

Senior Advisor to President of Pakistan
- In office 6 July 2012 – 16 March 2013
- Preceded by: Faisal Raza Abidi
- Succeeded by: Post abolished
- Constituency: PS-86 Karachi

Member of the National Assembly of Pakistan
- In office 17 March 2008 – 16 March 2013
- Preceded by: Hakim Qari Gul Rahman

Member of the Provincial Assembly of Sindh
- In office 18 October 1993 – 7 November 1996
- Preceded by: Ali Muhammad Hingoro
- Succeeded by: Muhammad Farooq Awan

Personal details
- Born: Abdul Qadir Patel
- Citizenship: Pakistani
- Party: PPP (2012-present)
- Education: Federal Urdu University

Abdul Qadir Patel (/pəˈtɛl/ Urdu: عبدالقادر پٹیل; born 8 August 1968) is a Pakistani politician who represents Pakistan Peoples Party (PPP) in the National Assembly of Pakistan. He served as chairman standing committee on Interior in the National Assembly of Pakistan. He elected as MNA in 2018 General elections in Pakistan from NA-248 (Karachi West-I) constituency and served as Minister of National Health in previous cabinet of Shehbaz Sharif. He re-elected as a Member of the National Assembly of Pakistan in 2024 Pakistani general election from newly formed constituency NA-243 (Karachi Keamari-II) taken oath February 2024.

== Political career ==
Patel entered politics as a member of the 10th Provincial Assembly of Sindh on 18 October 1993 during the by-election for constituency PS-86 Karachi (Lyari Town) he defeated Ali Mohammad Hingoro who was then member provincial assembly of Sindh however in election for 11th Provincial Assembly of Sindh he was succeeded by Muhammad Farooq Awan from constituency of PS 86. Later he was elected to the 13th National Assembly of Pakistan in February 2008 for the NA-239 (Karachi-I) Kemari Town seat in the general election on a Pakistan Peoples Party ticket after defeating then member National Assembly Hakim Qari Gul Rahman of Muttahida Majlis-e-Amal.

He had been associated with different departments and ministries within the Government of Pakistan such as the Department of Ports and Shipping, Foreign Affairs, Railways, and Labour. He serves as a member of the National Assembly of Pakistan as well as Chairman of the Standing Committee on the Interior. On 3 June 2012 he was appointed as President of the Karachi division of the Pakistan Peoples Party and as political adviser to President Asif Ali Zardari.

In March 2015, PPP suspended Patel from his position as Karachi Division president for breaching party discipline.

He secured 35076 votes from newly established NA-248 (Karachi West-I) constituency in 2018 General elections in Pakistan representing Pakistan Peoples Party and defeated Sardar Aziz of Pakistan Tehreek-e-Insaf by a narrow margin. He became member of 15th National Assembly of Pakistan on 13 August 2018. He was re-elected as Member National Assembly of Pakistan in 2024 Pakistani general election from the newly formed constituency NA-243 (Karachi Keamari-II) and took oath in February 2024.

Patel took oath as federal Minister for Ministry of National Health Services, Regulation and Coordination 19 April 2022 in newly formed Shehbaz Sharif federal cabinet that was formed following the success of the no-confidence motion against Imran Khan.

== Court trial ==
Patel had to face trial for a case that was registered under Karachi registry of the anti-terrorism court (ATC) while he was in London, United Kingdom. He was accused of allegedly getting criminals treated at a local hospital. He came back to Pakistan and surrendered voluntarily to the court of law as he presented himself for self-arrest in July 2016. Patel arrived at ATC and filed a plea, seeking bail in Dr. Asim case. The court approved bail plea and accepted the petition over surety bond of Rs 2 lac till 17 April but bail was rejected and he surrendered himself. He was released on permanent bail after four months of detention in November 2017. His case is under the process of anti-terrorism court (ATC) in Karachi.
