= 2005 Karachi local elections =

Pakistani elections

2005 Karachi local government elections
- 19 August 2005
- Turnout: 30% (Claim 1); 50% (Claim 2); 40% (Claim 3)

Party	MQM	JI	PPP
Percentage	59.0%	16.4%	12.4%
Elected Mayor
Syed Mustafa Kamal
MQM-L

2005 Karachi local government elections were the first Karachi local government elections to elect a mayor and a local council.

== Voting ==
In contrast to latest elections held in 2015, the mayors were elected in CDGK by direct voting of all elected counsellors. Each union council consisted of 13 members, which gave a total electorate of 2,314 members from 178 union councils.

== Result ==
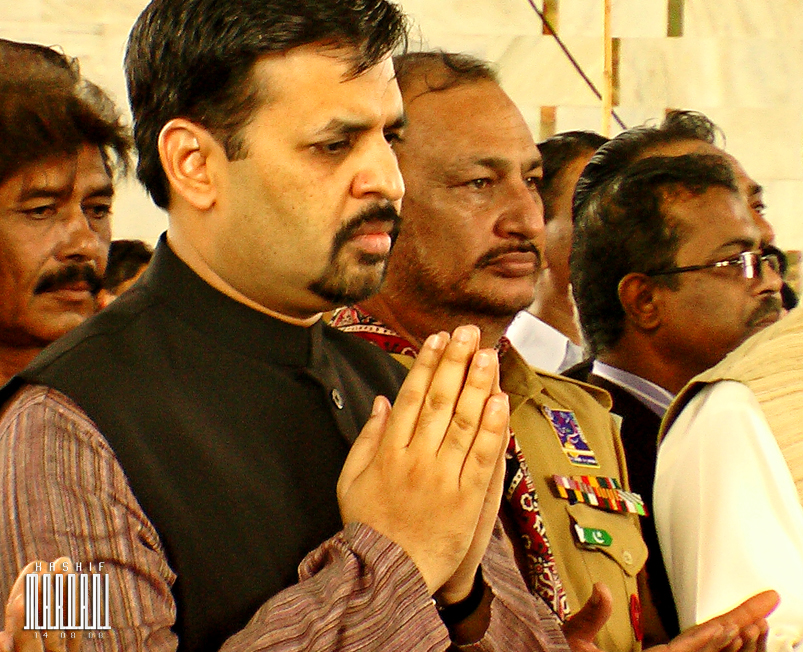
The elected mayor Syed Mustafa Kamal

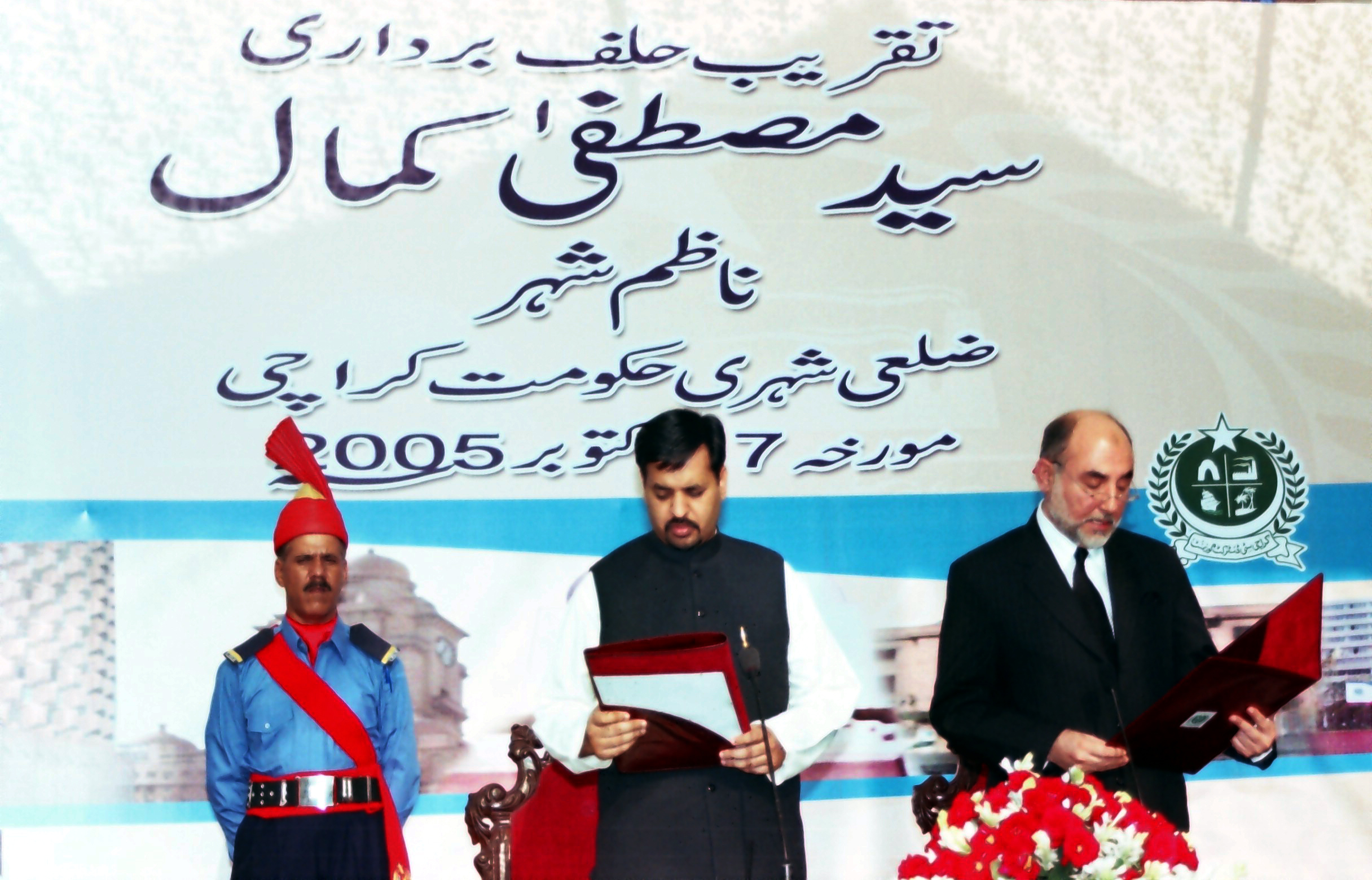
Syed Mustafa Kamal taking oath as Mayor of Karachi

The 2005 local government elections individual results are based on claims made by various parties; the official result has not remained as a part of the Election Commission of Pakistan's record.

The following party results are only based on estimate and is not a definite result.

Karachi Local Government Elections, 2005
#	Parties	Panel Name	Seats claimed	Claim 1	Claim 2	Average	Percentage	
1	MQM-L	Haq Parast	105	1,362	1,400	1,381	59.0%	
2	JI	Al-Khidmat	38	299	500	400	16.4%	
3	PPP	Awam Dost	25	202	400	301	12.4%	
4	ANP	Khidmatgar	3	40	100	70	3%	
5	JUI(F)	Insan Dost		31	100	65	2.7%	
6	PMLN	Watan Nawaz		28	80	54	2.2%	
7	Jamiat Ulema-e-Pakistan	Al-Khadim		10	80	45	1.8%	
8	Sunni Tehreek	Insan Dost		-	25	12	0.5%	
9	PTI	Insaf Pakistan		-	-	-	-	-
10	IND			100	100	100	4.1%	
Estimated total			171	2,072	2,785	2,428		
Actual total			178	2,314		5% error		
Turn out				30%	50%	40%		
