= Constituency NA-243 =

NA-243 constituency, in Pakistan, may refer to:

- NA-252 (Karachi West-V), formerly NA-243 Karachi-V
- NA-243 (Karachi East-II)
