= Chaudhry Iftikhar Hussain =

Chaudhry Iftikhar Hussain may refer to:

- Chaudhry Iftikhar Hussain (judge)
- Chaudhry Iftikhar Hussain (politician)
