= NA-244 Karachi West-I =

Constituency of the National Assembly of Pakistan

- Constituency for the National Assembly of Pakistan
- Region: Manghopir Town (partly) of Karachi West District in Karachi
- Electorate: 155,824

Current constituency
- Created: 30 November 2023
- Party: MQM-P
- Member: Farooq Sattar
- Created from: NA-243 Karachi-V

NA-244 Karachi West-I (این اے-244،کراچی مغربی-1) is a constituency for the National Assembly of Pakistan.

== Area ==
This constituency includes following Karachi neighborhoods: Surjani Town, Taiser Town, Qalandarani Goth, Abdullah Goth, Gulshan-e-Maymar, Mominabad, Gulshan-e-Tauheed, Manghopir, Ghazi Goth, Hazratabad, Ittehad Town, KDA Flats, etc.

== Assembly Segments ==
Constituency number	Constituency	District	Current MPA	Party
116	PS-116 Karachi West-I	Karachi West District	Ali Ahmed Jan	PPP
117	PS-117 Karachi West-II	Karachi West District	Sheikh Abdullah	MQM-P

== Members of Parliament ==
=== 2018–2023: NA-252 Karachi West-V ===
Election	Member	Party
2018	Aftab Jehangir	PTI

=== 2024–present: NA-244 Karachi West-I ===
Election	Member	Party
2024	Farooq Sattar	MQM–P

== Election 2002 ==
General elections were held on 10 October 2002. Sultan Ahmed Khan of Muttahida Qaumi Movement won by 62,245 votes.

General election 2002: NA-243 Karachi Central Cum Karachi West
Party	Candidate	Votes	%	±%
MQM	Sultan Ahmed Khan	62,245	66.29	
MMA	Muhammad Saleemuddin Qureshi	13,105	13.96	
PPP	Anwar Ahmed Khan Yousufzai	8,391	8.94	
PST	Muhammad Iftikhar Ahmed Bhatti	6,911	7.36	
PML(Q)	Badar Iqbal	2,580	2.75	
Others	Others (two candidates)	661	0.70	
Turnout		94,001	37.50	
Total valid votes		93,893	99.89	
Rejected ballots		108	0.11	
Majority		49,140	52.33	
Registered electors		250,670		

== Election 2008 ==
General elections were held on 18 February 2008. Abdul Waseem of Muttahida Qaumi Movement won by 167,764 votes.

General election 2008: NA-243 Karachi Central Cum Karachi West
Party	Candidate	Votes	%	±%
MQM	Abdul Waseem	167,764	87.32	
PPP	Zafar Ahmed Siddiqui	22,147	11.53	
Others	Others (four candidates)	2,222	1.15	
Turnout		193,864	58.17	
Total valid votes		192,133	99.11	
Rejected ballots		1,731	0.89	
Majority		145,617	75.79	
Registered electors		333,290		
MQM hold				

== Election 2013 ==
General elections were held on 11 May 2013. Abdul Waseem of Muttahida Qaumi Movement won by 192,638 votes and became the member of National Assembly.

General election 2013: NA-243 Karachi Central Cum Karachi West
Party	Candidate	Votes	%	±%
MQM	Abdul Waseem	192,638	79.86	
PTI	Zahid Hussain Hashmi	29,875	12.38	
JI	Muhammad Yousuf	8,578	3.56	
PPP	Syed Sohail Abidi	5,831	2.42	
Independent	Abdul Nabi Brohi	3,457	1.43	
Others	Others (four candidates)	854	0.35	
Turnout		245,061	57.77	
Total valid votes		241,233	98.44	
Rejected ballots		3,828	1.56	
Majority		162,762	67.48	
Registered electors		424,198		
MQM hold				

== Election 2018 ==
General elections were held on 25 July 2018.

General election 2018: NA-252 Karachi West-V
Party	Candidate	Votes	%	±%
PTI	Aftab Jehangir	21,065	24.92	
MQM-P	Abdul Kadir Khanzada	17,858	21.12	
TLP	Muhammad Furqan	10,107	11.96	
MMA	Abdul Majeed Khaskheli	10,074	11.92	
PPP	Abdul Khaliq Mirza	9,909	11.72	
PML(N)	Muhammad Ayub Khan	6,495	7.68	
PSP	Iftikhar Randhawa	4,786	5.66	
Others	Others (nine candidates)	4,248	5.02	
Turnout		86,757	39.61	
Total valid votes		84,542	97.45	
Rejected ballots		2,215	2.55	
Majority		3,207	3.80	
Registered electors		219,042		
PTI gain from MQM-P				

== Election 2024 ==
General elections were held on 8 February 2024. Farooq Sattar of MQM-P won by 20,048 votes and became the member of National Assembly.

General election 2024: NA-244 Karachi West-I
Party	Candidate	Votes	%	±%
MQM-P	Farooq Sattar	20,048	33.76	▲12.64
PTI	Aftab Jehangir (Note: Filed nomination papers as PTI candidate but ECP allowed him to run as an Independent)	14,073	23.70	▼1.22
PPP	Abdul Berr	7,450	12.54	▲0.82
JI	Irfan Ahmed	6,141	10.34	N/A
TLP	Zameer Hussain	4,340	7.31	▼4.65
PML(N)	Ghulam Rasool	2,277	3.83	▼3.85
Independent	Syed Muhammad Rehmat Ali Rehmani	2,155	3.63	N/A
Others	Others (seventeen candidates)	2,907	4.89	
Turnout		60,631	38.95	▼0.66
Total valid votes		59,391	97.95	
Rejected ballots		1,240	2.05	
Majority		5,975	10.06	
Registered electors		155,682		
MQM-P gain from PTI				

== See also ==
- NA-243 Karachi Keamari-II
- NA-245 Karachi West-II
