= Faisal Vawda =

Pakistani politician

Senator Faisal Vawda
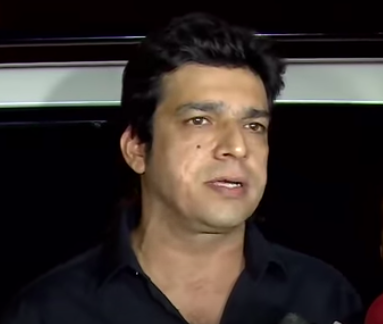

Senate of Pakistan
- Incumbent
- Assumed office 25 April 2024
- Constituency: Sindh
- In office 12 March 2021 – 9 February 2022
- Constituency: Sindh

Ministry of Water Resources (Pakistan)
- In office 5 October 2018 – 3 March 2021
- President: Arif Alvi
- Prime Minister: Imran Khan
- Succeeded by: Moonis Elahi

Member of the National Assembly of Pakistan
- In office 13 August 2018 – 3 March 2021
- Succeeded by: Qadir Mandokhail
- Constituency: NA-249 (Karachi West-II)

Personal details
- Born: 11 June 1974 (age 52) Illinois, United States
- Party: Independent (2025–present)
- Other political affiliations: PTI (2010–2022)
- Spouse(s): Nazli Vawda Saadia Afzaal (m. 2020; div. 2024)
- Children: 3
- Occupation: Politician; Businessman

Faisal Vawda is a Pakistani politician and businessman who was the Federal Minister for Water Resources from 5 October 2018 to 3 March 2021. He has previously been a member of the National Assembly of Pakistan from August 2018 till March 2021. He was elected as a senator after winning in the 2021 Senate Elections on a seat from Sindh and held the seat until he was disqualified for being a dual national on 9 February 2022. He was a member of Pakistan Tehreek-e-Insaf (PTI) from 2010 to 2022, when his membership was terminated by the party.

== Business career ==
Faisal Vawda hails from the Farid Ahmed Vawda business family and, prior to his political career, was involved in the family-owned FAV Group of Companies, established in 1984, specializing in textile dyes, chemicals, masterbatches, plastic manufacturing, air compressors, industrial inverters, security equipment, and toner distribution, with operations in Karachi, Lahore, and Faisalabad. FAV & Co is described as a leading provider of dyes and chemicals to Pakistan's textile industry.

== Political career ==
=== Pakistan Tehreek-e-Insaf (2010–2022) ===
Faisal Vawda was elected to the National Assembly of Pakistan from the Constituency NA-249 (Karachi West-II) as a candidate of Pakistan Tahreek-e-Insaf in the 2018 General Elections. He received 35,344 votes and defeated Shahbaz Sharif. Following his election, a petition was submitted in the Sindh High Court, seeking his disqualification for not disclosing the details of his foreign bank accounts and properties in the affidavit submitted to the Election Commission of Pakistan.

On 5 October 2018, he was inducted into the federal cabinet of Prime Minister Imran Khan and was appointed as Federal Minister for Water Resources.

On 3 March 2021, the day of the 2021 Senate Elections, he resigned from his seat as a member of the National Assembly. He became a Senator after winning in the 2021 Senate Elections and held the seat till 9 February 2022 when he was disqualified by the ECP for being a dual national.

==== Termination ====
As a senior member of PTI, Faisal Vawda held a press conference on 26 October 2022, where he talked about Imran Khan's Azadi long march and disclosed the party's policy about the march. According to the PTI, Faisal Vawda's press conference was against the party policy as he talked to media without notifying the party. As a result, PTI issued him a show cause notice and need answer for his press talk. On 29 October 2022 the PTI issued a termination letter to Vawda undersigned by PTI chief Imran Khan for his failure to respond to the party's show cause notice.

== Assets ==
As of 2010, Faisal Vawda is owner of Faisal Vawda Group.

In 2016, NAB summoned Faisal Vawda for an inquiry pertaining to fraudulent allotment of amenity plots. A notice issued by NAB said that hundreds of amenity plots have been allotted to Faisal Vawda Group, a company owned by Vawda.

In 2019, Saudi Pak Leasing Company Limited filed a plea against Vawda and his father for not returning a loan taken for business purposes.

In 2020, the Federal Board of Revenue released its 2018 tax directory for parliamentarians which noted that Vawda did not pay any taxes. He later denied the allegations by posting his tax returns on his Twitter feed.

In early October 2021, Faisal Vawda was named in the Pandora Papers.
