= NA-242 Karachi Keamari-I =

Constituency of the National Assembly of Pakistan

- Constituency for the National Assembly of Pakistan
- Region: Baldia Town and SITE Town (partly) of Keamari District in Karachi
- Electorate: 437,790

Current constituency
- Party: MQM-P
- Member: Syed Mustafa Kamal
- Created from: NA-241 Karachi-III

NA-242 Karachi Keamari-I (این اے-242، کراچی کیماڑی-1) is a constituency for the National Assembly of Pakistan that encompasses Baldia.

== Assembly Segments ==
Constituency number	Constituency	District	Current MPA	Party
112	PS-112 Karachi Keamari-II	Keamari District	Muhammad Asif	PPP
113	PS-113 Karachi Keamari-III	Keamari District	Faheem Ahmed Patni	MQM-P
114	PS-114 Karachi Keamari-IV	Keamari District	Muhammad Shabbir Qureshi	PTI

== Members of Parliament ==
=== 2002–2018: NA-241 Karachi-III ===
Election	Member	Party
2002	Muhammad Laeeq Khan	MMA
2008	Iqbal Qadri	MQM
2013	Iqbal Qadri	MQM

=== 2018–2022: NA-249 Karachi West-II ===
Election	Member	Party
2018	Faisal Vawda	PTI
2021	Qadir Khan Mandokhel	PPP

== Election 2002 ==
General elections were held on 10 October 2002. Muhammad Laeeq Khan of Muttahida Majlis-e-Amal won by 26,812 votes.

General election 2002: NA-241 Karachi West-III
Party	Candidate	Votes	%	±%
MMA	Muhammad Laeeq Khan	26,812	36.41	
MQM	Feroze Uddin Rehmani	26,333	35.76	
PPP	Muhammad Afaque Khan Shahid	6,264	8.51	
ANP	Naeem Gul	5,953	8.09	
PML(N)	Wazirzada Afridi	2,470	3.35	
PST	Mirza Shakeel Arman Baig	2,360	3.21	
Others	Others (ten candidates)	3,442	4.67	
Turnout		74,558	36.99	
Total valid votes		73,634	98.76	
Rejected ballots		924	1.24	
Majority		479	0.65	
Registered electors		201,562		

== Election 2008 ==
General elections were held on 18 February 2008. Iqbal Qadri of Muttahida Qaumi Movement won by 93,617 votes.

General election 2008: NA-241 Karachi West-III
Party	Candidate	Votes	%	±%
MQM	Iqbal Qadri	93,617	64.24	
ANP	Zarbali Syed	36,236	24.86	
PPP	Dr. Muhammad Shakir Alam	11,544	7.92	
PML(N)	Wazeer Ahmed Afridi	3,510	2.41	
Others	Others (seven candidates)	828	0.57	
Turnout		147,344	54.86	
Total valid votes		145,735	98.91	
Rejected ballots		1,609	1.09	
Majority		57,381	39.38	
Registered electors		268,582		
MQM gain from MMA				

== Election 2013 ==
General elections were held on 11 May 2013. Iqbal Qadri of Muttahida Qaumi Movement won by 95,584 votes and became the member of National Assembly.

General election 2013: NA-241 Karachi West-III
Party	Candidate	Votes	%	±%
MQM	Iqbal Qadri	95,584	58.61	
PTI	Dr. Saeed Ahmed Afridi	27,827	17.06	
JI	Muhammad Laeeq Khan	14,438	8.85	
JUI (F)	Misbah Ul Alam	11,697	7.17	
ANP	Syed Karam Darwesh	7,190	4.41	
PPP	Ali Ahmed	3,361	2.06	
Others	Others (thirteen candidates)	3,001	1.84	
Turnout		164,066	52.44	
Total valid votes		163,098	99.41	
Rejected ballots		968	0.59	
Majority		67,757	41.55	
Registered electors		312,861		
MQM hold				

== Election 2018 ==
General elections were held on 25 July 2018.

General election 2018: NA-249 Karachi West-II
Party	Candidate	Votes	%	±%
PTI	Faisal Vawda	35,344	27.50	
PML(N)	Shehbaz Sharif	34,626	26.95	
TLP	Mufti Abid Mubarak Hussain	23,981	18.66	
MQM-P	Aslam Shah	13,534	10.53	
MMA	Syed Attaullah Shah	10,307	8.02	
PPP	Qadir Mandokhail	7,236	5.63	
Others	Others (nine candidates)	3,473	2.71	
Turnout		131,185	39.58	
Total valid votes		128,501	97.95	
Rejected ballots		2,684	2.05	
Majority		718	0.55	
Registered electors		331,430		
PTI gain from MQM-P				

== By-election 2021 ==
A by-election was held in this constituency on 29 April 2021. The Election Commission of Pakistan stayed the process for consolidation of result and fixed May 4 as the date for hearing of Pakistan Muslim League (N) candidate, Miftah Ismail’s application seeking a recount of votes. Upon accepting his request, lawmakers were asked by the ECP to reach the office of the returning officer (RO) on May 6 for the recount. On May 6 recounting of votes again started which held until 8 May and in the final result PPP candidate was again declared as the winner with the margin of 909 votes from its rival PML-N. On the other hand, all of the four main political parties (PMLN, PSP, PTI and MQM-Pakistan) boycotted this recount demanding the repoll again in whole constituency.

By-election 2021: NA-249 Karachi West-II
Party	Candidate	Votes	%	±%
PPP	Qadir Mandokhail	15,656	31.42	+25.79
PML(N)	Miftah Ismail	14,747	29.59	+2.64
TLP	Mufti Nazeer Ahmed	10,668	21.41	+2.75
PSP	Syed Mustafa Kamal	8,728	17.52	
PTI	Amjad Iqbal Afridi	8,681	17.42	−10.08
MQM-P	Hafiz Muhammad Mursaleen	7,007	14.06	+3.53
Turnout		73,471	21.64	
Total votes		49,831		
Registered electors		339,591		
PPP gain from PTI				

== Election 2024 ==
General elections were held on 8 February 2024. Syed Mustafa Kamal won the election with 71,527 votes.

General election 2024: NA-242 Karachi Keamari-I
Party	Candidate	Votes	%	±%
MQM-P	Syed Mustafa Kamal	71,527	37.89	▲23.83
PTI	Dawa Khan (Note: Filed nomination papers as PTI candidate but ECP allowed him to run as an Independent)	53,770	28.47	▲11.05
PPP	Qadir Mandokhail	17,464	9.25	▼22.17
JI	Fazal Ahad	13,706	7.26	N/A
TLP	Muhammad Sajid	13,547	7.17	▼14.24
PML(N)	Ghulam Shoaib	11,894	6.30	▼23.29
Others	Others (twenty-three candidates)	6,927	3.67	
Turnout		191,288	43.69	▲22.05
Total valid votes		188,835	98.72	
Rejected ballots		2,453	1.28	
Registered electors		437,790		
MQM-P gain from TLP				

== See also ==
- NA-241 Karachi South-III
- NA-243 Karachi Keamari-II
