= Baldia Colony =

Coordinates: 24°56′N 66°58′E

Baldia Colony (Urdu: بلدیہ کالونی) is one of the neighborhoods of Baldia Town in Karachi, Sindh, Pakistan.

Baldia was established as a katchi abadi after 1958. It was estimated to contain 1 million people.

There are several ethnic groups including Muhajirs, Punjabis, Sindhis, Kashmiris, Seraikis, Pakhtuns, Balochis, Memons, ( Hazarewal) Bohras and Ismailis. Over 99% of the population is Muslim.
