= Ashfaq Mangi =

Pakistani politician

Senior Vice Chairman of PSP
- In office September 1 2020 – January 12 2023

Assembly Member for Constituency PS-127 (Karachi-XXXIX)
- In office 2013–2016

Personal details
- Born: Khairpur, Sindh, Pakistan
- Party: MQM-P (2023-present)
- Other political affiliations: PSP (2016-2023); MQM-L (2013-2016)
- Parent: Atta Muhammad Mangi (father)
- Education: Shah Abdul Latif University (Masters)

Ashfaque Ahmad Mangi (born 16 August 1971) is a Pakistani politician who was the senior vice chairman of PSP (PSP).

== Political career ==
=== Provincial Assembly of Sindh ===
In 2013, Ashfaq contested the elections for Sindh Provincial Assembly with Constituency PS-127. He received 59811 votes and won his seat in the Sindh Provincial Assembly.

=== Joining Pak Sarzameen Party ===
In 2016, Ashfaq joined Pak Sarzameen Party and resigned from his provincial assembly seat. In September 2020, Ashfaq was elected as the senior vice chairman of Pak Sarzameen Party.

== Early life and education ==
Ashfaq was born on 16 August 1971 in Khairpur, Sindh. He did his masters in economics from Shah Abdul Latif University. His father is Atta Muhammad Mangi.
