= Shabbir Qaimkhani =

Pakistani politician

Shabbir Ahmed Qaimkhani
- شبیر احمد قیخانی

Member of Provincial Assembly of Sindh
- President: Pervez Musharraf
- Prime Minister: Zafarullah Khan Jamali

Personal details
- Born: Mirpur Khas, Sindh, Pakistan
- Party: MQM-H (2025-present)
- Other political affiliations: MQM-P (2023-2025); PSP (2016-2023); MQM-L (1995-2016)
- Parent: Muhammad Bashir Khan (father)
- Education: Sindh Agriculture University, Tandojam

Shabbir Ahmed Qaimkhani is a Pakistani politician who served as Provincial Minister for IT in Sindh. He was a member and the Sindh President of Pak Sarzameen Party.

== Political career ==
Shabbir was appointed as Circle Incharge for Kot Ghulam Muhammad Circle in the year 1986 and then appointed as Sector Incharge in the same circle in 1988.

In 1993, Shabbir Ahmed Qaimkhani was elected as Member of Zonal Committee of Mirpurkhas Zone as well as also elected as Zonal Incharge of Mirpurkhas with the help of General Party Election in 1997. He became member of MQM in the year 1995. He was currently working as Joint Incharge of MQM as he has also elected as Member Provincial Assembly in General Election 2002 from Mirpurkhas. Shabbir also served as the IT Minister of Sindh.[2]

Shabbir Ahmed Qaimkhani was a member of MQM-L who has served as Provincial Minister for IT in Sindh. He worked as Joint Incharge of MQM-L.

He was also elected as Member Provincial Assembly in the 2002 Pakistani general election from Mirpur Khas.

Shabbir has also worked on most of the junior posts in the party. In April 2018 Shabbir Qaimkhani joined PSP (PSP). Shabbir Qaimkhani is a senior member of PSP. Qaimkhani was also the Sindh President for PSP.

== Early life and education ==
=== Parents ===
Shabbir Ahmed Qaimkhani's father is Muhammad Bashir Khan.

=== Education ===
Shabbir completed his matriculation from rural areas and passed his matriculation from Govt. Boys High School, Kot Ghulam Muhammad. He then received his degree in BSc Honors from Sindh Agriculture University, Tando Jam.
