= Journal of Financial Stability =

Peer-reviewed journal

- Discipline: Finance
- Language: English

Publication details
- History: 2004-present
- Publisher: Elsevier
- Frequency: Bimonthly
- Impact factor: 3.727 (2020)

Standard abbreviations
- ISO 4: J. Financ. Stab.

Indexing
- ISSN: 1572-3089

Links
- Journal homepage

The Journal of Financial Stability is a bimonthly peer-reviewed academic journal on financial crises and stability. It is published by Elsevier and the editor-in-chief is Iftekhar Hasan (Fordham University). It was established in 2004.

== Abstracting and indexing ==
The journal is abstracted and indexed in:

- Social Sciences Citation Index
- Scopus
- EconLit
- RePEc

According to the Journal Citation Reports, the journal has a 2020 impact factor of 3.727.
