= Rabistan Khan =

Pakistani politician

Member of the Provincial Assembly of Sindh
- In office 13 August 2018 – 11 August 2023
- Constituency: PS-122 (Karachi West-XI)

Personal details
- Born: Karachi, Sindh, Pakistan
- Party: PTI (2018-present)

Rabistan Khan is a Pakistani politician who had been a member of the Provincial Assembly of Sindh from August 2018 to August 2023.

== Political career ==
He was elected to the Provincial Assembly of Sindh as a candidate of Pakistan Tehreek-e-Insaf from Constituency PS-122 (Karachi West-XI) in the 2018 Pakistani general election.

In October 2018, Sindh Anti-Corruption Establishment initiated an inquiry against Khan after he was accused by Aftab Jehangir of land grabbing in Taiser Town.
