= PP-80 Sargodha-X =

Constituency of the Punjabi Provincial Legislature, Pakistan

- Constituency for the Provincial Assembly of Punjab
- Region: Shahpur Tehsil of Sargodha District

Current constituency
- Created from: PP-38 Sarghoda-XI (2002–2018); PP-81 Sargodha-X (2018-2023)

PP-80 Sargodha-X (پی پی-80، سرگودھا-10) is a Constituency of Provincial Assembly of Punjab.

== General elections 2024 ==
Provincial election 2024: PP-80 Sargodha-X
Party	Candidate	Votes	%	±%
PML(N)	Sardar Muhammad Asim Sher Maken	38,336	29.86	
Independent	Chaudhry Iftikhar Hussain (Note: Filed nomination papers as PTI candidate but ECP allowed him to run as an Independent)	35,411	27.58	
Independent	Saif Ur Rehman	12,482	9.72	
Independent	Gul Muhammad Shah	11,665	9.09	
PPP	Mian Muhammad Ali Raza	10,708	8.34	
TLP	Muhammad Khan	6,809	5.30	
Independent	Muhammad Irfan Ali Shah	3,998	3.11	
Independent	Muhammad Jamshed	2,264	1.76	
Others	Others (thirteen candidates)	6,730	5.24	
Turnout		134,998	50.46	
Total valid votes		128,403	95.11	
Rejected ballots		6,595	4.89	
Majority		2,925	2.28	
Registered electors		267,548		
hold				

== General elections 2018 ==
Provincial election 2018: PP-81 Sargodha-X
Party	Candidate	Votes	%	±%
PTI	Chaudhary Iftikhar Hussain	41,633	32.35	
PML(N)	Syed Javed Husnain	40,752	31.67	
Independent	Muhammad Asif Hayat	29,702	23.08	
PPP	Sardar Muhammad Atif Maken	8,398	6.53	
TLP	Muhammad Bilal Nawaz	3,796	2.95	
Independent	Muhammad Amir	2,278	1.77	
MMA	Muhammad Bashir	1,285	1.00	
Others	Others (two candidates)	842	0.65	
Turnout		133,903	56.93	
Total valid votes		128,686	96.10	
Rejected ballots		5,217	3.90	
Majority		881	0.68	
Registered electors		235,220		

== General elections 2013 ==
Provincial election 2013: PP-38 Sargodha-XI
Party	Candidate	Votes	%	±%
Independent	Sardar Bahadar Khan Maikan	39,240	37.67	
PML(N)	Muhammad Munir Qureshi	27,034	25.95	
PTI	Chaudhari Iftikhar Hussain Gondal	15,952	15.31	
PPP	Muhammad Mazhar Khan	8,497	8.16	
JI	Malik Muhammad Bashir Awan Advocate	7,074	6.79	
Independent	Malik Ahmed Ishaq Tiwana	5,096	4.89	
Others	Others (six candidates)	1,269	1.22	
Turnout		109,984	58.53	
Total valid votes		104,162	94.71	
Rejected ballots		5,822	5.29	
Majority		12,206	11.72	
Registered electors		187,921		

== General elections 2008 ==
Provincial election 2008: PP-38 Sargodha-XI
Party	Candidate	Votes	%	±%
PML(N)	Shahzadi Umerzadi Tiwana	57,510	64.04	
PML(Q)	Muhammad Munir Qureshi	28,268	31.48	
Independent	Sardar Bahadar Khan Maken	2,852	3.18	
MMA	Mehr Zahoor Ahmed Arain	1,179	1.31	
Turnout		92,910	50.37	
Total valid votes		89,809	96.66	
Rejected ballots		3,101	3.34	
Majority		29,242	32.56	
Registered electors		184,460		

== See also ==
- PP-79 Sargodha-IX
- PP-81 Khushab-I
