= Aftab Jehangir =

Pakistani politician

Member of the National Assembly of Pakistan
- In office 13 August 2018 – 17 January 2023
- Constituency: NA-252 (Karachi West-V)

Personal details
- Born: Karachi, Sindh, Pakistan
- Party: PTI (2018-present)

Aftab Jehangir (Urdu: آفتاب جہانگیر) is a Pakistani politician who had been a member of the National Assembly of Pakistan from August 2018 till January 2023.

== Political career ==
He was elected to the National Assembly of Pakistan from Constituency NA-252 (Karachi West-V) as a candidate of Pakistan Tehreek-e-Insaf in the 2018 Pakistani general election.

In October 2018, the Sindh Anti-Corruption Establishment initiated an inquiry against Jehangir after he was accused by Rabistan Khan of land grabbing in Taiser Town.

=== Resignation ===
In April 2022, he also resigned from the National Assembly seat along with all Tehreek-e-Insaaf members after the no confidence motion against Imran Khan.

== See also ==
- List of members of the 15th National Assembly of Pakistan
- List of Pakistan Tehreek-e-Insaf elected members (2013–2018)
- No-confidence motion against Imran Khan
