= Salman Mujahid Baloch =

Pakistani politician

Member of the National Assembly of Pakistan
- In office 1 June 2013 – 31 May 2018
- Constituency: NA-239 (Karachi-I)

Personal details
- Born: 1 September 1976 (age 49) Karachi, Sindh, Pakistan

Mohammad Salman Khan Baloch (Urdu: محمد سلمان خان بلوچ; born 1 September 1976) is a Pakistani politician who had been a member of the National Assembly of Pakistan from June 2013 to May 2018.

== Early life and political career ==
He was born on 1 September 1976. He was elected to the National Assembly of Pakistan as a candidate of Muttahida Qaumi Movement (MQM) from Constituency NA-239 (Karachi-I) in the 2013 Pakistani general election. He received 39,251 votes and defeated Subhan Ali, a candidate of Pakistan Tehreek-e-Insaf (PTI).

In December 2017, he quit MQM to join Pak Sarzameen Party (PSP). In February 2018, he rejoined MQM.

== Controversy ==
A police complaint was registered against Baloch on 13 February 2018 for allegedly threatening a worker of Pakistan Tehreek-e-Insaf. Baloch denied the accusation. The same day, another complaint was registered against Baloch for raping and blackmailing a woman. Baloch denied the allegation. On 15 February 2018, a police case was registered against Baloch over charges of kidnapping and physically assaulting a local resident.
