= Abdul Waseem =

Pakistani politician

Member of the National Assembly of Pakistan
- In office 2008 – 31 May 2018
- Constituency: NA-243 (Karachi-V)

Personal details
- Party: MQM-P (2016-present)
- Other political affiliations: MQM-L (2008-2016)

Abdul Waseem (Urdu: عبدل وسیم; born 6 October 1964) is a Pakistani politician who had been a member of the National Assembly of Pakistan, from 2008 to May 2018.

== Early life ==
He was born on 6 October 1964.

== Political career ==
He was elected to the National Assembly of Pakistan as a candidate of Muttahida Qaumi Movement (MQM) from Constituency NA-243 (Karachi-V) in the 2008 Pakistani general election. He received 16,7764 votes and defeated Zafar Ahmed Siddiqui, a candidate of Pakistan Peoples Party (PPP).

He was re-elected to the National Assembly as a candidate of MQM from Constituency NA-243 (Karachi-V) in the 2013 Pakistani general election. He received 192,638 votes and defeated Zahid Hussain Hashmi, a candidate of Pakistan Tehreek-e-Insaf (PTI).
