= NA-243 Karachi Keamari-II =

Constituency of the National Assembly of Pakistan

- Constituency for the National Assembly of Pakistan
- Region: Keamari Town, Manora Cantonment, SITE Town (partly) and Maripur Town of Keamari District in Karachi
- Electorate: 453,424

Current constituency
- Party: PPP
- Member: Abdul Qadir Patel
- Created from: NA-239 Karachi-I

NA-243 Karachi Keamari-II (این اے-243، کراچی کیماڑی-2) is a constituency for the National Assembly of Pakistan. The Kiamari Town is represented by Constituency NA-239 of National Assembly of Pakistan. While PS-89 and PS-90 represents in Sindh Assembly.

== Assembly Segments ==
Constituency number	Constituency	District	Current MPA	Party
111	PS-111 Karachi Keamari-I	Keamari District	Liaquat Ali Askani	PPP
115	PS-115 Karachi Keamari-V	Keamari District	Muhammad Asif Khan	PPP

== Members of Parliament ==
=== 2018–2023: NA-248 Karachi West-I ===
Election	Member	Party
2018	Abdul Qadir Patel	PPPP

=== 2024–present: NA-243 Karachi Keamari-II ===
Election	Member	Party
2024	Abdul Qadir Patel	PPPP

== Election 2002 ==
General elections were held on 10 October 2002. Hakim Qari Gul Rehman of Muttahida Majlis-e-Amal won by 22,164 votes.

General election 2002: NA-239 Karachi West-I
Party	Candidate	Votes	%	±%
MMA	Gul Rehman	22,164	29.77	
PPP	Iftikhar Hussain	21,461	28.83	
MQM	Ashiq Hussain Qureshi	11,199	15.04	
PML(Q)	Akhtar Pervaiz	4,527	6.08	
PML(N)	Mian Ejaz Ahmad Shaffl	3,871	5.20	
PMA	Muhammad Qasim Sherazi	3,621	4.86	
PTI	Amanullah Paracha	2,824	3.79	
Others	Others (eleven candidates)	4,783	6.43	
Turnout		75,773	33.23	
Total valid votes		74,450	98.25	
Rejected ballots		1,323	1.75	
Majority		703	0.94	
Registered electors		228,031		

== Election 2008 ==
General elections were held on 18 February 2008. Abdul Qadir Patel of PPP won by 56,840 votes.

General election 2008: NA-239 Karachi West-I
Party	Candidate	Votes	%	±%
PPP	Abdul Qadir Patel	56,840	51.36	
MQM	Salman Mujahid Baloch	24,013	21.70	
PML(N)	Syed Hafeezuddin	12,329	11.14	
MMA	Muhammad Usman	5,869	5.30	
Independent	Iftikhar Hussain	3,980	3.60	
Independent	Haleem Ahmed Siddiqui	3,568	3.22	
PML(Q)	Amanullah Paracha	2,132	1.93	
Others	Others (seven candidates)	1,944	1.75	
Turnout		113,052	36.19	
Total valid votes		110,675	97.90	
Rejected ballots		2,377	2.10	
Majority		32,827	29.66	
Registered electors		312,401		
PPP gain from MMA				

== Election 2013 ==
General elections were held on 11 May 2013. Abdul Qadir Patel of Pakistan Peoples Party was defeated by Mohammad Salman Khan Baloch of Muttahida Qaumi Movement who won by 39,251 votes and became the member of National Assembly.

General election 2013: NA-239 Karachi West-I
Party	Candidate	Votes	%	±%
MQM	Salman Mujahid Baloch	39,251	25.77	
PTI	Subhan Ali	34,408	22.59	
PPP	Abdul Qadir Patel	27,814	18.26	
JUI (F)	Fakharul Hassan	20,954	13.76	
JI	Akhtar Mohammad	6,939	4.56	
MDM	Abdul Hameed	6,689	4.39	
ANP	Sarfaraz Khan Jadoon	6,394	4.20	
Independent	Mohammad Younas	3,789	2.49	
Independent	Abdul Qadir	1,157	0.76	
Others	Others (seventeen candidates)	4,899	3.22	
Turnout		153,899	41.18	
Total valid votes		152,294	98.96	
Rejected ballots		1,605	1.04	
Majority		4,843	3.18	
Registered electors		373,762		
MQM gain from PPP				

== Election 2018 ==
General elections were held on 25 July 2018.

General election 2018: NA-248 Karachi West-I
Party	Candidate	Votes	%	±%
PPP	Abdul Qadir Patel	35,124	28.89	
PTI	Sardar Abdul Aziz	34,101	28.04	
PML(N)	Muhammad Salman Khan	20,732	17.05	
TLP	Asghar Mehmood	13,797	11.35	
MMA	Gul Muhammad Afridi	8,967	7.37	
Others	Others (seven candidates)	8,873	7.30	
Turnout		124,672	41.11	
Total valid votes		121,594	97.53	
Rejected ballots		3,078	2.47	
Majority		1,023	0.85	
Registered electors		303,258		
PPP gain from MQM-P				

== Election 2024 ==
General elections were held on 8 February 2024. Abdul Qadir Patel won the election with 60,266 votes.

General election 2024: NA-243 Karachi Keamari-II
Party	Candidate	Votes	%	±%
PPP	Abdul Qadir Patel	60,266	36.08	▲7.19
PTI	Shujaat Ali (Note: Filed nomination papers as PTI candidate but ECP allowed him to run as an Independent)	48,690	29.15	▲1.11
PML(N)	Akhtar Hussain Jadoon	19,595	11.73	▼5.32
JI	Shiraz Khan Jadoon	13,082	7.83	N/A
TLP	Syed Kashif Ali Shah	12,569	7.53	▼3.82
MQM-P	Humayun Sultan	7,176	4.30	▲3.12
Others	Others (thirteen candidates)	5,635	3.37	
Turnout		170,004	37.49	▼3.62
Total valid votes		167,013	98.24	
Rejected ballots		2,991	1.76	
Majority		11,576	6.93	▲6.08
Registered electors		453,424		
PPP hold				

== See also ==
- NA-242 Karachi Keamari-I
- NA-244 Karachi West-I
