= Iqbal Qadri =

Pakistani politician (born 1948)

Member of the National Assembly of Pakistan
- In office 2008 – 31 May 2018
- Constituency: NA-241 (Karachi-III)

Personal details
- Born: 21 November 1948 (age 77) Karachi, Sindh, Pakistan

Iqbal Qadri (Urdu: اقبال قادری; born 21 November 1948) is a Pakistani politician who had been a member of the National Assembly of Pakistan from 2008 to May 2018. Previously he had been a member of the Provincial Assembly of Sindh from 2002 to 2007.

== Early life and education ==
He was born on 21 November 1948.

He has the degree of Bachelor of Laws and Master of Arts.

== Political career ==
Qadri is a lawyer by profession and has been a member of Muttahida Qaumi Movement (MQM) since 1992.

He was elected to the Provincial Assembly of Sindh as a candidate of MQM from Constituency PS-96 (Karachi-VIII) in the 2002 Pakistani general election. He received 22,534 votes and defeated Amanullah Khan Niazi, a candidate of Muttahida Majlis-e-Amal (MMA).

He was elected to the National Assembly of Pakistan as a candidate of MQM from Constituency NA-241 (Karachi-III) in the 2008 Pakistani general election. He received 93,617 voted and defeated Zarbali Syed, a candidate of Awami National Party (ANP).

He was re-elected to the National Assembly as a candidate of MQM from Constituency NA-241 (Karachi-III) in the 2013 Pakistani general election. He received 95,584 votes and defeated Saeed Ahmed Afridi, a candidate of Pakistan Tehreek-e-Insaf (PTI).
