= Sardar Iftikhar Ahmed Khan =

Pakistani politician

Member-elect of the Provincial Assembly of Punjab
- In office 24 October 2018 – 14 January 2023
- Constituency: PP-3 Attock-III

Personal details
- Party: JUI (F) (2025-present)
- Other political affiliations: PMLN (2018-2025)

Sardar Iftikhar Ahmed Khan is a Pakistani politician who had been a member of the Provincial Assembly of the Punjab from October 2018 till January 2023.

== Early life ==
Sardar Iftikhar Ahmed Khan son of Khan Aziz Ahmed Khan was born on November 27, 1969, at Fateh Jang and graduated in 2006 from Allama Iqbal Open University, Islamabad.

== Political career ==
Khan was elected to the Provincial Assembly of Punjab as a candidate of Pakistan Muslim League (N) (PML (N)) from the constituency PP-3 in the 2018 Pakistani by-elections held on 14 October 2018. He defeated Muhammad Akbar Khan of Pakistan Tehreek-e-Insaf (PTI). Khan garnered 43,259 votes while his closest rival secured 43,032 votes.

He was commissioned in Pakistan Army in 1991 as an Officer. He served as Councillor, Municipal Corporation Fateh Jang during 1998–99; and as Tehsil Nazim, Fateh Jang during 2001–05. An agriculturist, who has been elected as Member, Provincial Assembly of the Punjab in by-elections held on October 14, 2018. His brother, Sardar Mukhtar Ahmad Khan was chairman, Union Council Ajuwala District Attock during 2015–19; and another brother, Mr Abid Aziz, served as Member, Municipal Committee Fateh Jang during 2015–19.
