= Dhoraji Colony =

- Town
- Location in Gulshan-e-Iqbal, Sindh, Pakistan
- Coordinates: 24.8872°N 67.0769°E
- Country: Pakistan
- State: Sindh
- District: Sindh

Languages
  - Official: Memoni, Urdu, English
- Time zone: PST
- Telephone code: +92

Dhoraji Colony (Urdu: دھوراجی کالونی ) is a neighbourhood in Gulshan-e-Iqbal Town, Karachi (Karachi East), Sindh, Pakistan, which is located between UC-1 (Civic Center Union Council) and UC-2 (Dehli Mercantile Union Council). The demarcation separating the two Union Councils runs from the National Stadium Road (Coming from National Stadium, Karachi), towards Selani Chowk, past ZVMG Rangoonwala Community Centre via Siraj-ud-Daula road (the area closer to National Stadium Road falls under the Civic Center Union Council).

Dhoraji Colony hosts a predominately Memon Muslim community that has historically played an essential role in the development of Karachi and of Pakistan.

== Brief history ==
The name 'Memon' comes from Mu'min (مؤمن, “believer” in Arabic). The Memons, who embraced Islam in Sindh, migrated to Kutch (Kutch district). From there, they spread out to other parts of the region including Kathiawar, Dhoraji and Mumbai. Memons also went on to establish communities outside the Indian subcontinent in several Middle Eastern, African (Africa), East Asian and European countries. Following the Partition of India, many Dhoraji Memon families migrated back to Karachi, Sindh, in the newly formed state of Pakistan.

== Places/organizations of interest ==
- Kibriya Masjid
- Zubaida Medical Center (ZMC)
- Masjid-e-Habibia
- Mustafa Masjid
- Jamal Noor Hospital
- V.M. Public School
- ZVMG Rangoonwala Community Centre (ZVMG Rangoonwala Trust)
- Selani Chowk
- Dhoraji Association
- Dhoraji Youth Services Foundation
