= Malik Iftikhar Ahmed =

Pakistani politician

Member of the Provincial Assembly of the Punjab
- In office 19 August 2008 – 31 May 2018

Personal details
- Born: 15 May 1972 (age 54) Islamabad, Pakistan
- Party: PMLN (2008-present)
- Relatives: Malik Ibrar Ahmed (brother)

Malik Iftikhar Ahmed is a Pakistani politician who was a Member of the Provincial Assembly of the Punjab, from 2008 to May 2018, again from February 2024.

== Early life and education ==
He was born on 15 May 1972 in Islamabad.

He has completed intermediate level education.

== Political career ==
He was elected to the Provincial Assembly of the Punjab as a candidate of Pakistan Muslim League (N) (PML-N) from Constituency PP-10 (Rawalpindi-X) in a by-poll held in August 2008. He received 18,322 votes and defeated an independent candidate, Malik Mehboob Elahi.

He was elected to the Provincial Assembly of the Punjab as a candidate of PML-N from Constituency PP-10 (Rawalpindi-X) in the 2013 Pakistani general election. He received 42,539 votes and defeated Umer Tanveer, a candidate of Pakistan Tehreek-e-Insaf (PTI).
