= Saira Iftikhar =

Pakistani politician

Member of the Provincial Assembly of the Punjab
- In office 29 May 2013 – 31 May 2018
- Constituency: Reserved seat for women

Personal details
- Born: Karachi
- Party: Pakistan Muslim League (N)

Saira Iftikhar (Punjabi, Urdu: سائرہ افتخار) is a Pakistani politician who was a Member of the Provincial Assembly of the Punjab, from May 2013 to May 2018.

== Early life and education ==
She was born in Karachi.

She has earned the degree of Master of Arts in English and bachelor's degree in Advance Management from Hamburger University.

== Political career ==
She was elected to the Provincial Assembly of the Punjab as a candidate of Pakistan Muslim League (N) on a reserved seat for women in the 2013 Pakistani general election.
