= Iftikhar Mohmand =

Provincial Finance Mbbbbbbinister of Khyber Pakhtunkhwa Assembly
- In office ?–?

Personal details
- Party: Jamiat Ulema-e-Islam (F)
- Profession: Politician

Iftikhar Mohmand is a Pakistani politician and member of to Jamiat Ulema-e-Islam (F). He has also served as provincial finance minister of the Khyber Pakhtunkhwa Assembly. Mohamand joined JUI-F in July 2022.
