= Iftikhar Ahmad (barrister) =

Veteran of the War of 1971 and a political activist

Personal details
- Born: May 5, 1949 Peshawar, Pakistan
- Party: Pakistan Peoples Party (1979–1999); Pakistan Tehreek-e-Insaf (since 2022)

Military service
- Allegiance: Pakistan
- Branch/service: Pakistan Army
- Years of service: 1968–1978
- Rank: Major
- Battles/wars: Bangladesh Liberation War; Indo-Pakistan War of 1971

Barrister Iftikhar Ahmad (born 5 December 1949, Peshawar) is a Pakistani barrister, political activist and former military officer. He served in the Pakistan army between 1968-78. He fought in East Pakistan in 1971 and was a PoW in India. After the 1977 military coup, he resigned from the army, as a serving Major, in protest against General Zia's Martial Law. He began a period of exile in London and became a close associate of Mir Murtaza and Shah Nawaz Bhutto in the struggle against dictatorship, having joined the Pakistan Peoples Party in 1979. He later became a close aide to Benazir Bhutto and returned to Pakistan during Zia's rule, only to be jailed and tried in a court martial. After a successful appeal against a death sentence, he was released and became a prominent & respected PPP figure, serving as Advisor to the Chief Minister Khyber Pakhtoonkhwa, and later, as a Member of the Senate of Pakistan. He also held several party offices including President PPP (Overseas), Deputy Information Secretary PPP and was a member of the Central Executive Committee of the party. He parted ways with PPP on a matter of principle when Aftab Sherpao was ousted from the party. As a Barrister, he has been involved in prominent international legal cases and represented the State of Pakistan.

== Early life ==
Iftikhar Ahmad was born on 5 May 1949 in Peshawar. At a young age in the 1960s, he started out as a TV Drama Actor on PTV or Pakistan Television.

== Military experience ==
At the age of 19, he passed out from Pakistan Military Academy as a distinguished cadet, joining the Frontier Force Regiment. 1971 - Fought the war as a combatant in Sylhet and Bhairab Bazar. Named in battle in Military records. Remained a Highly Graded Officer throughout service with an Exceptional Military Training record. 1971 - 1973 - Prisoner of War in India for a 2 1/2-year period. 1977 - As a Major, studied French language in Islamabad and obtained Diploma in French Language. 1978 - During turmoil of General Zia's Martial Law, resigned as a protest against the Martial Law, upholding his constitutional oath to defend the Constitution of Pakistan. 1988 - Upon return from exile, remained incarcerated by military for 11 months. Court Martial trial resulted in guilty verdict on Desertion charges. Death sentence approved by General Zia-ul-Haq. This was overturned on appeal, as was conviction, resulting in release from Adiala Jail in 1989.

== Political experience ==
1978 - Close association with Mir Murtaza Bhutto in the campaign to save Z. A. Bhutto's life. Helped organise International Jurists’ Convention, rallies and demonstrations against the brutality of US-backed Martial Law. Formed Committee for Democratic Pakistan that held international conferences in London on issues of the restoration of democracy and human rights in Pakistan. 1983 - Political aide to Benazir Bhutto during her period of exile and political activism in London. 1989 - Upon release from political imprisonment, was tasked by PM Benazir Bhutto to set up Bhutto Academy of Social and Political Sciences. The Academy failed to see the light as the PM subsequently withdrew interest during her tenure in Government. 1989-1991 Senior Advisor to the Chief Minister, NWFP. Served in a ministerial role under CM Aftab Sherpao. Tasked with Ministries of Law and Information (in both PPP governments in 1990s). 1991-1993 Appointed President of PPP Overseas by Benazir Bhutto, uniting the European chapters of the party under a cohesive international strategy. 1993 - Appointed Deputy Information Secretary of PPP and member of Central Executive Committee. 1996 - Elected as a Member of the Senate of Pakistan. Served on Standing Committees for Finance and Health.

Boards : Member, Board of Governors, National Bank of Pakistan. Governor, Bhutto Sports Foundation. Member, Board of Governors for Sheikh Zayed Hospital, Lahore. Director, Trust for Voluntary Organizations. Law : Called to the Bar in 1986. Conducted leading UK criminal trials (Strangeways Prison Riots Inquiry, The Sheriff of Nottingham trial, Successful defence of Kashmir JKLF leader Amanullah Khan against extradition to India, Commercial Arbitration case in Brazil and matters relating to the Swiss cases of Benazir Bhutto and Asif Ali Zardari. INTERPOL and extradition matters and led various constitutional cases in the superior courts of Pakistan, including the challenge to the candidature of Rafique Tarar in presidential elections in 1997. Regular analyst on BBC TV and radio and various Pakistani TV channels. Frequent Op-ed contributor of English dailies of Pakistan. Special Prosecutor for National Accountability Bureau in 2000. Principal of I A Solicitors and Wentworth Solicitors 2006 and 2014

Education Postgraduate Diploma in Law, University of Westminster. Bar Vocational Course, Inns of Court School of Law, Chancery Lane, London Bar-at-law from the Honourable Society of Lincoln's Inn.

His career includes legal advocacy and political involvement at the national level. His military background provided training in strategic planning and decision-making. He has contributed to the development of party manifestos and served as a political advisor to figures including Murtaza Bhutto, Benazir Bhutto, and Aftab Sherpao, as well as providing counsel to the State of Pakistan.

Having played Club Cricket in London, Ahmad is now a golfer. He pursues poetry, painting and film-making as means of creative and independent expression.
