= Iftikhar Durrani =

Pakistani politician

Ex-Special Assistant to Prime Minister of Pakistan

Personal details
- Born: 20 June 1969 (age 57) Abbottabad, KPK, Pakistan
- Party: Pakistan Tehreek-e-Insaf
- Education: George Brown College; National Defense University

Iftikhar Durrani (Urdu: افتخار درانی; born 20 June 1969) is a Pakistani politician of Pakistan Tehreek-e-Insaf, who served as Special Assistant to Prime Minister and head of Central Media Department of Pakistan Tehreek-e-Insaf. Previously, Durrani served as Advisor on Communication in Education Department to the Government of Khyber Pakhtunkhwa in 2013. He is Ph.D. in Public Policy from National Defense University.

== Educational career ==
Durrani was born in Abbottabad, Khyber Pakhtunkhwa on 20 June 1969. He holds a master's degree in development studies from Iqra University and political sciences from University of the Punjab. Durrani went to George brown college Toronto for Post Graduate Diploma in Data Base Marketing. He completed his doctor of philosophy in Public Policy, titled Politics of Educational Policy Making in Pakistan, a Comparative Study of two regimes.
