= Iftekhar Hasan =

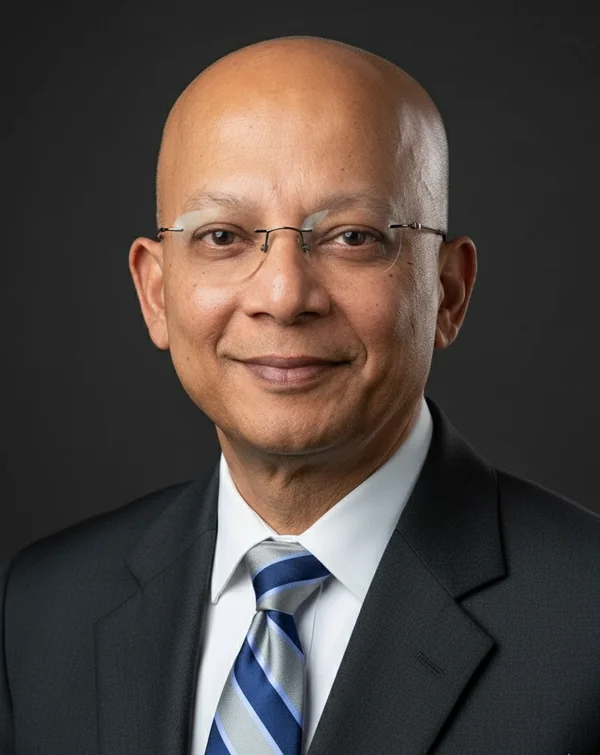
- Spouse: Nada T. Kobeissi (1962-2020)

Academic background
- Education: University of Dhaka (Bachelor of Social Science); University of Houston(M.A) (PhD)

Academic work
- Discipline: corporate finance financial institutions capital markets emerging economies
- Institutions: Fordham University

Iftekhar Hasan is an American economist and finance scholar. He is a Professor at Fordham University, where he serves as the E. Gerald Corrigan Chair in Finance at the Gabelli School of Business.

He is known for his work in corporate finance, financial institutions, capital markets, and emerging economies, with an emphasis on interdisciplinary research and public policy.

== Education ==
He earned his Ph.D. in Economics (along with an M.A.) from the University of Houston. Before that, he completed his undergraduate honors degree in economics (Bachelor of Social Science) from the University of Dhaka.

== Career ==
In 2019, Hasan was formally named to the rank of university professor at Fordham University. He also serves as a scientific advisor at the Central Bank of Finland and holds visiting appointments at institutions including the University of Sydney and the IWH Halle Institute for Economic Research in Germany. Hasan is one of the founding editors and the managing editor of the Journal of Financial Stability and co-editor of Financial Markets, Institutions and Instruments.

He is also a recipient of the Changjiang (Yangtze River) Scholar" in China. He has received honorary doctorate degrees "Doctor Honoris Causa" awards from the Romanian American University in Bucharest, Romania and the University of Vaasa in Finland. Over his career, Hasan has held faculty or visiting positions at University of Cambridge, the University of Rome, Carlos III University of Madrid, the University of Strasbourg, University of Limoges, Charles University of Prague, National Taiwan University, EPFL at Lausanne, and NYU Stern School of Business.

Hasan has advised World Bank, the International Monetary Fund, the United Nations, the Federal Reserve Bank, the U.S. Treasury's Office of the Comptroller of the Currency, Banque de France, the Development Bank of Japan, FITD, and the Italian Deposit Insurance Corporation.

He is also a member of advisory boards at institutions such as the University of Economics Ho Chi Minh City, Universitas Sebelas Maret, Hong Kong Polytechnic University, and Montpellier Business School, France. His work focuses on global financial stability, the dynamics of emerging markets, and the interaction between finance and public policy.

== Research ==
Hasan's research focuses on financial institutions, corporate finance, emerging markets, international banking, and public policy. His work has appeared in journals such as Journal of Financial Economics, Journal of Accounting Research, Economic Journal, Management Science, Journal of Financial and Quantitative Analysis, Journal of International Business Studies, Strategic Management Journal and Journal of Management Information Systems.

A prominent theme in Hasan's research is the interdisciplinary study of economic and financial behavior. In "And Forgive Us Our Debts": Do Christian Moralities Influence Overindebtedness of Individuals?, he and co-authors examine how differing Christian doctrines affect household financial distress.

In "The Effect of Board Directors from Countries with Different Genetic Diversity Levels on Corporate Performance", Hasan and colleagues link the genetic diversity of board members' countries of origin to corporate performance.

Another study, "Corporate Moral Values", analyzes linguistic features in corporate earnings calls to identify the moral values guiding managerial decision-making.

== Selected publications ==
- Teall, John L.; Hasan, Iftekhar (2002). Quantitative methods for finance and investments (1. publ ed.). Oxford: Blackwell. ISBN 978-0-631-22339-9.
- Hasan, Iftekhar; Lee, Haekwon; Qiu, Buhui; Saunders, Anthony (2025-10-10). "Climate-related disclosure commitment of the lenders, credit rationing, and borrower environmental performance". Review of Accounting Studies. doi:10.1007/s11142-025-09918-z. ISSN 1380-6653.
- Hasan, Iftekhar; Kwak, Boreum; Li, Xiang (2024). "Financial technologies and the effectiveness of monetary policy transmission". European Economic Review. 161 104650. doi:10.1016/j.euroecorev.2023.104650. ISSN 0014-2921.
- Hasan, Iftekhar; He, Qing; Lu, Haitian (2021-04-12). "Social Capital, Trusting, and Trustworthiness: Evidence from Peer-to-Peer Lending". Journal of Financial and Quantitative Analysis. 57 (4): 1409–1453. doi:10.1017/s0022109021000259. hdl:10397/92721. ISSN 0022-1090.
- Wu, Qiang; Dbouk, Wassim; Hasan, Iftekhar; Kobeissi, Nada; Zheng, Li (2021). "Does gender affect innovation? Evidence from female chief technology officers". Research Policy. 50 (9) 104327. doi:10.1016/j.respol.2021.104327. hdl:10397/93360. ISSN 0048-7333.
- Delis, Manthos D.; Gaganis, Chrysovalantis; Hasan, Iftekhar; Pasiouras, Fotios (2017). "The Effect of Board Directors from Countries with Different Genetic Diversity Levels on Corporate Performance". Management Science. 63 (1): 231–249. doi:10.1287/mnsc.2015.2299. ISSN 0025-1909.
- Francis, Bill B.; Hasan, Iftekhar; Shen, Yinjie (Victor); Wu, Qiang (2021). "Do activist hedge funds target female CEOs? The role of CEO gender in hedge fund activism". Journal of Financial Economics. 141 (1): 372–393. doi:10.1016/j.jfineco.2020.07.019. hdl:10397/91935. ISSN 0304-405X.
- Delis, Manthos D.; Hasan, Iftekhar; Iosifidi, Maria (2017-03-16). "On the Effect of Business and Economic University Education on Political Ideology: An Empirical Note". Journal of Business Ethics. 155 (3): 809–822. doi:10.1007/s10551-017-3483-9. ISSN 0167-4544.
- Fang, Yiwei; Hasan, Iftekhar; Leung, Woon Sau; Wang, Qingwei (2019-05-20). "Foreign ownership, bank information environments, and the international mobility of corporate governance". Journal of International Business Studies. 50 (9): 1566–1593. doi:10.1057/s41267-019-00240-w. ISSN 0047-2506.
- HASAN, IFTEKHAR; HOI, CHUN-KEUNG STAN; WU, QIANG; ZHANG, HAO (2017-01-17). "Does Social Capital Matter in Corporate Decisions? Evidence from Corporate Tax Avoidance". Journal of Accounting Research. 55 (3): 629–668. doi:10.1111/1475-679x.12159. hdl:10419/212392. ISSN 0021-8456.
