= Qadir Mandokhail =

Pakistani politician

Qadir Khan Mandokhail

Member of the National Assembly of Pakistan
- In office 30 April 2021 – 10 August 2023
- Constituency: NA-249 (Karachi West-II)

Personal details
- Born: Karachi, Sindh, Pakistan
- Party: MQM-H (2026-present)
- Other political affiliations: PPP (2018-2025)

Qadir Khan Mandokhail (Urdu: قادر خان مندوخیل) is a Pakistani politician who had been a member of the National Assembly of Pakistan from April 2021 till August 2023. He is a member of Pakistan Peoples Party (PPP).

== Political career ==
=== 2018 elections ===
In 2018, Mandokhail contested from NA-249 (Karachi West-II). However, Mandokhail failed to win as he received only 7,236 votes and lost by 28,108 votes.

=== 2021 by-elections ===
He contested the by-election in constituency NA-249 (Karachi West-II) on 29 April 2021. The main competition in the constituency was going on between PSP, PML(N) and TLP. Pakistan Peoples Party were on the fourth position. All of a sudden the lights in Baldia went out and the results didn't come out. After some hours, Pakistan Peoples Party's candidate Qadir Khan Mandokhail was on the first, with Miftah Ismail in second, TLP in third and PSP were fourth. The final results were Mandokhail securing 16,156 votes and defeating the PML-N candidate Miftah Ismail by a margin of only 600 votes. Pak Sarzameen Party and Pakistan Muslim League (N) leaders claimed that the elections were rigged.
