= Anis Kaimkhani =

Pakistani politician

President of PSP
- In office 23 March 2016 – 12 January 2023

Personal details
- Born: Hyderabad, Sindh, Pakistan
- Party: MQM-P (2023-present)
- Other political affiliations: PSP (2016-2023); MQM-L (1985-2013)
- Parent: Hidayat Ali Khan (father)
- Committees: Rabita Committee (2011-2013)

Anis Kaimkhani (Note: Urdu: انیس قائمخانی) (born 5 October) is a Pakistani politician who is one of the deputy conveners of the Muttahida Qaumi Movement - Pakistan (MQM-P). He was formerly a co-founder and president of Pak Sarzameen Party (PSP) from 2016 until its merger into the MQM-P in 2023.

== Family and personal life ==
=== Early life and education ===
Anis Kaimkhani was born on 5 October in Hyderabad, Pakistan, where he also received his early education.

His father was Hidayat Ali Khan who died in December 2012.

== Political career ==
=== Working with MQM ===
Kaimkhani joined MQM in 1985 and rose to the position of unit in charge within two years. Then in 1987 he became the Unit-Incharge. In 1992 he was promoted to the rank of Zonal Incharge Hyderabad. Afterwards he was inducted into party's central co-ordination, Rabita Committee.

==== Rabita Committee ====
In 2011 Altaf Hussain, the chief of the MQM, selected Kaimkhani to be Rabita Committee's deputy convener. The party gave him many responsibilities in 2013 after which he was deducted. He was the former deputy convener of Muttahida Qaumi Movement (MQM). Then he left the party and stayed with Mustafa Kamal out of Pakistan. They stayed there for three years.

=== Comeback and formation of Pak Sarzameen Party ===
Anis Kaimkhani, along with Syed Mustafa Kamal, returned to Karachi on 3 March 2016 holding a press conference in a rented house at Khayaban e Sahar in Defence phase 6 Karachi on the same day at 3:00 PM. They both founded a party which was called Pak Sarzameen Party. Kamal became the chairman while Kaimkhani became the president.

Later on in January 2018, before the 2018 Pakistan general elections, Farooq Sattar invited Kamal and Kaimkhani to rejoin the party but they rejected. Kaimkhani did not contested in the 2018 Pakistan general elections.
