= Iftikhar Alam Khan =

Indian museologist

- Born: Kaimganj, Farrukhabad, Uttar Pradesh
- Spouse: Mrs. Parveen Alam
- Children: Dr. Kiran Alam Khan (Daughter) Dr. Shah Alam Khan (Son)
- Father: Gulam Rabbani Taban

Iftikhar Alam Khan (Born 17th January 1938) is an Indian museologist known for his work in reorganising natural history galleries of State Museum Lucknow, in its new building where he worked with architect Lawrence Wilfred "Laurie" Baker. He was also associated with National Museum of Natural History, New Delhi and Somali National Museum, Mogadishu. He is Founding Chairman of Department of Museology, A.M.U. Aligarh.

== Life and education ==
Iftikhar Alam Khan was born in Kaimganj, Farrukhabad, UP. After early schoolings in Kaimganj he joined Aligarh Muslim University from where he completed his MSc. Thereafter, he joined MS University Baroda for PG in Museology. Later, Alam completed his M.Phil. and PhD from AMU, Aligarh. In 1969 he received East West Center Scholarship to join East West Center at Honolulu Hawaii for completing his Management Training in Museology. During his role as Director of Sir Syed Academy he developed interest in Syed’s work and since he has published 11 books.

== Professional works ==
- In 1970 he started Post Graduate Diploma in Museology at AMU, Aligarh.
- In 1973 he went on deputation to Government of India to serve National Museum of Natural History.
- 1976 he was appointed at Baghdad Natural History Research Center and Museum.
- 1979, he joined, Somali National Museum, Mogadishu Somalia.
- In 1988 he established Department of Museology at AMU Aligarh and served as its Head for 10 years.
- He retired from Department of Museology in 1998.
- Post retirement he served Director Sir Syed Academy from 1999-2001.

== List of books (Urdu) ==
1. Sir Syed and Scientific Society, Maktaba Jamia 2000.
2. Sir Syed and the Art of Construction (History of MAO College through its Buildings), Sir Syed Academy Aligarh 2001.
3. The Story of Muslim University: Through its Buildings (1920 to 1947).
4. Sir Syed in Personal Life, Educational Book House 2006.
5. Months and Years of Sir Syed House (Post Syed Mahmood) Heritage Publications Aligarh 2008.
6. Sir Syed’s Movement: Political and Social Perspectives, Educational Book House Delhi 2010.
7. Sir Syed and Indian Agriculture Administration, Educational Publishing House, New Delhi 2014
8. Sir Syed Worldview on Education, Educational Publishing House, New Delhi 2017.
9. Sir Syed’s Liberal, Secular and Scientific Thinking, Educational Publishing House, New Delhi 2018.
10. Sir Syed and Modernism, Educational Publishing House, New Delhi, 2018.
11. History of University School (1875-1947), Educational Publishing House, New Delhi 2019.
