= Muslim Mujahid Colony =

Neighbourhood of Karachi, Pakistan

Muslim Mujahid Colony (Urdu: مسلم مجاہد کالونی) is a neighbourhood in the Karachi West district of Karachi, Pakistan, that previously was a part of Baldia Town until 2011.

There are several ethnic groups in Muslim Mujahid Colony including Muhajirs, Christians, Sindhis, Kashmiris, Seraikis, Pakhtuns, Balochis, Brahuis, Memons, Bohras and Ismailis.
