= Muhajir Camp =

Residential neighbourhood in Baldia Town, Karachi, Pakistan

Muhajir Camp (Urdu: مہاجر کیمپ) is a neighbourhood in the Keamari District of Karachi, Pakistan, that is a part of Baldia Town.
