= Saeedabad, Karachi =

Neighbourhood in Karachi, Pakistan

Saeedabad سعید آباد
- Town
- Saeedabad
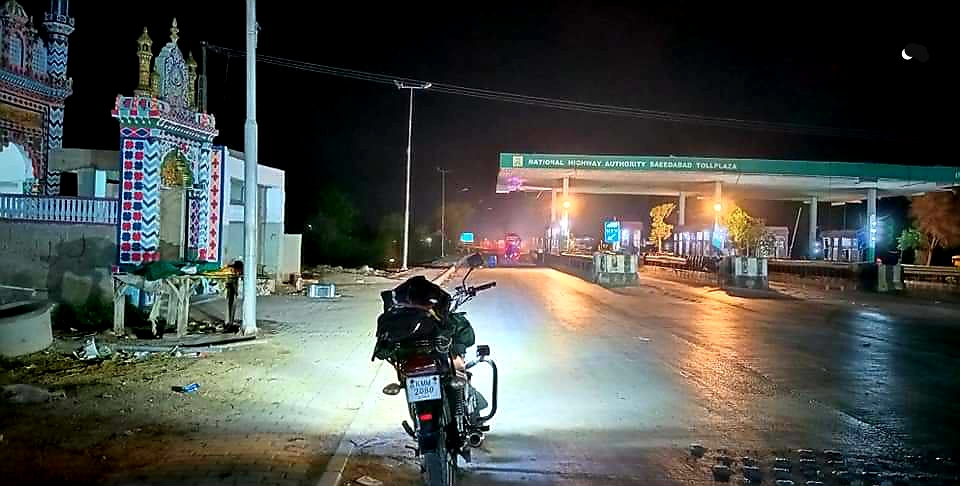
- Toll plaza in Saeedabad
- Country: Pakistan
- Province: Sindh
- District: District of West Karachi

Population (2017 census)
  - Total: 832,768 (Baldia Town population)
- Time zone: UTC+5 (PKT)
- Postal code: 75760
- Calling code: 021
- Number of union councils: 1
- Number of U/c of Saeedabad: 5

Saeedabad (Urdu: سعيد آباد) is a residential neighbourhood in the Karachi West district of Karachi, Pakistan, within Baldia Town.

There are several ethnic groups in Saeedabad including Muhajirs, Sindhis, Kashmiris, Seraikis, Pakhtuns, Hindu-speaking, Balochis, Brahuis, Memons, Bohras, Qadir Kutchi and Ismailis.
