= Gulshan-e-Ghazi =

Residential neighbourhood in Karachi, Pakistan

Coordinates: 24°56′03″N 66°58′24″E

Gulshan-e-Ghazi (Urdu: گلشنِ غازی) is a neighbourhood in the Karachi West district of Karachi, Pakistan, that is a part of Baldia Town.

There are several ethnic groups in Gulshan-e-Ghazi including Muhajirs, Hindko(Hazara) Sindhis, Kashmiris, Seraikis, Pakhtuns, Balochis, Brahuis, Memons, Punjabis Bohras, Ismailis, etc. Over 99% of the population is Muslim.
