= Gujrat Colony =

Gujrat Colony is a neighbourhood in the Baldia Town municipality of Karachi Pakistan.

There are several ethnic groups in the neighbourhood including Muhajirs, Sindhis, Kashmiris, Seraikis, Pakhtuns, Balochis, Brahuis, Memons, Bohras, Ismailis, etc. Over 99% of the population is Muslim. The population of Baldia Town is estimated to be nearly one million.
