= Rasheedabad =

Neighbourhood of Karachi, Pakistan

Rasheedabad (Urdu: رشيد آباد) is a neighbourhood in the Karachi West district of Karachi, Pakistan, that previously was a part of Baldia Town until 2011.

There are several ethnic groups in Rasheedabad and these groups include Muhajirs, Sindhis, Kashmiris, kutchi kumhar, Pakhtuns, Balochis, Brahuis, Memons, Bohras and Ismailis.
