= Nai Abadi =

Residential neighbourhood in Baldia Town, Karachi, Pakistan

Nai Abadi (Urdu: نئی آبادی) is a residential neighbourhood in Baldia Town, Karachi West district of Karachi, Pakistan.
