= Kokan Colony =

Kokan Colony is a neighbourhood in the Baldia Town municipality of Karachi, Pakistan.

There are several ethnic groups in neighbourhood including Muhajirs, Sindhis, Kashmiris, Konkani Muslims, Seraikis, Pakhtuns, Balochis, Brahuis, Memons, Bohras, Ismailis, etc. Over 99% of the population is Muslim. The population of Baldia Town is estimated to be nearly one million.
