= Delhi Colony, Karachi =

Neighbourhood in Karachi, Pakistan

Coordinates: 24°50′N 67°03′E

Delhi Colony (Urdu: دہلی کالونی) is a neighbourhood in the vicinity of Clifton, Karachi, Pakistan.
