= Syed Mustafa Kamal =

Pakistani politician (born 1971)

- سید مصطفی کمال
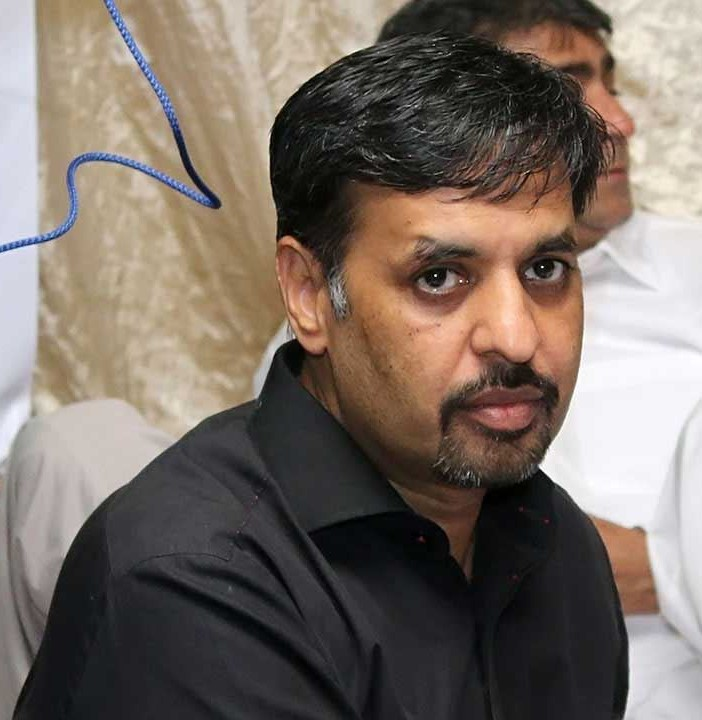

Minister of National Health Services, Regulation and Coordination
- Incumbent
- Assumed office 27 February 2025
- President: Asif Ali Zardari
- Prime Minister: Shehbaz Sharif
- Deputy: Mukhtar Ahmad Bharath
- Preceded by: Abdul Qadir Patel

Member of National Assembly of Pakistan
- Incumbent
- Assumed office 29 February 2024
- Constituency: NA-242 Karachi Keamari-I

Member of the Senate of Pakistan
- In office 12 March 2012 – 21 April 2014

28th Mayor of Karachi
- In office 7 October 2005 – 6 October 2010
- Preceded by: Naimatullah Khan
- Succeeded by: Waseem Akhtar

Provincial Minister of Sindh for Information Technology
- In office 2003–2005

Member of the Provincial Assembly of Sindh
- In office 10 October 2002 – October 2005
- Constituency: PS-117 (Karachi-XXIX)

Personal details
- Born: 27 December 1971 (age 54) Karachi, Sindh, Pakistan
- Party: MQM-P (2023–present)
- Other political affiliations: PSP (2016–2023); MQM-L (2003–2013)
- Parent(s): Jamila Khatoon (mother); Anis Ahmed (father)
- Occupation: Politician

Syed Mustafa Kamal (Note: Urdu: سید مصطفی کمال) (born 27 December 1971) is a Pakistani politician who is serving as the Minister of National Health Services, Regulation and Coordination since 2025. He is also a member of the National Assembly of Pakistan since 2024.

Born in Karachi to a Bihari Muhajir family, Kamal began his political career by joining the Muhajir Qaumi Movement (MQM) in the 1980s. He rose to prominence by becoming a confidant of MQM leader Altaf Hussain and, in 2003, he was nominated Information Technology Minister of Sindh. He served in that capacity from 2003 to 2005, and then as mayors of Karachi from 2005 to 2010. Kamal went into a self-imposed exile in 2013 citing personal reasons.

He returned to Pakistan in 2016 and conducted a press conference, in which he denounced MQM leader Altaf Hussain, the party's militant activities and created his own party, Pak Sarzameen Party (PSP). Kamal merged the PSP into the Muttahida Qaumi Movement – Pakistan (MQM–P) in 2023, subsequently becoming one of the senior deputy conveners of MQM–P. He was appointed minister of health by Prime Minister Shehbaz Sharif in 2025.

== Early life ==
Syed Mustafa Kamal was born on 27 December 1971 in Karachi, Pakistan. His parents were Anis Ahmad and Jamila Khatoon who migrated to Pakistan during partition of India from Bihar. After joining MQM, he went to study in University of Wales in the United Kingdom. In 1996, Kamal studied at the Sunway College.

Syed Mustafa Kamal is married and has 3 children.

== Political career ==
=== Ministry of Information Technology ===
In 2003, Kamal was chosen to be the IT Minister for the Sindh Province. Syed Mustafa Kamal served as the IT Minister for the Sindh province from 2003 to 2005, Afterward Mustafa Kamal was nominated Mayor of Karachi By Altaf Hussain,

=== Mayor of Karachi and Senator ===
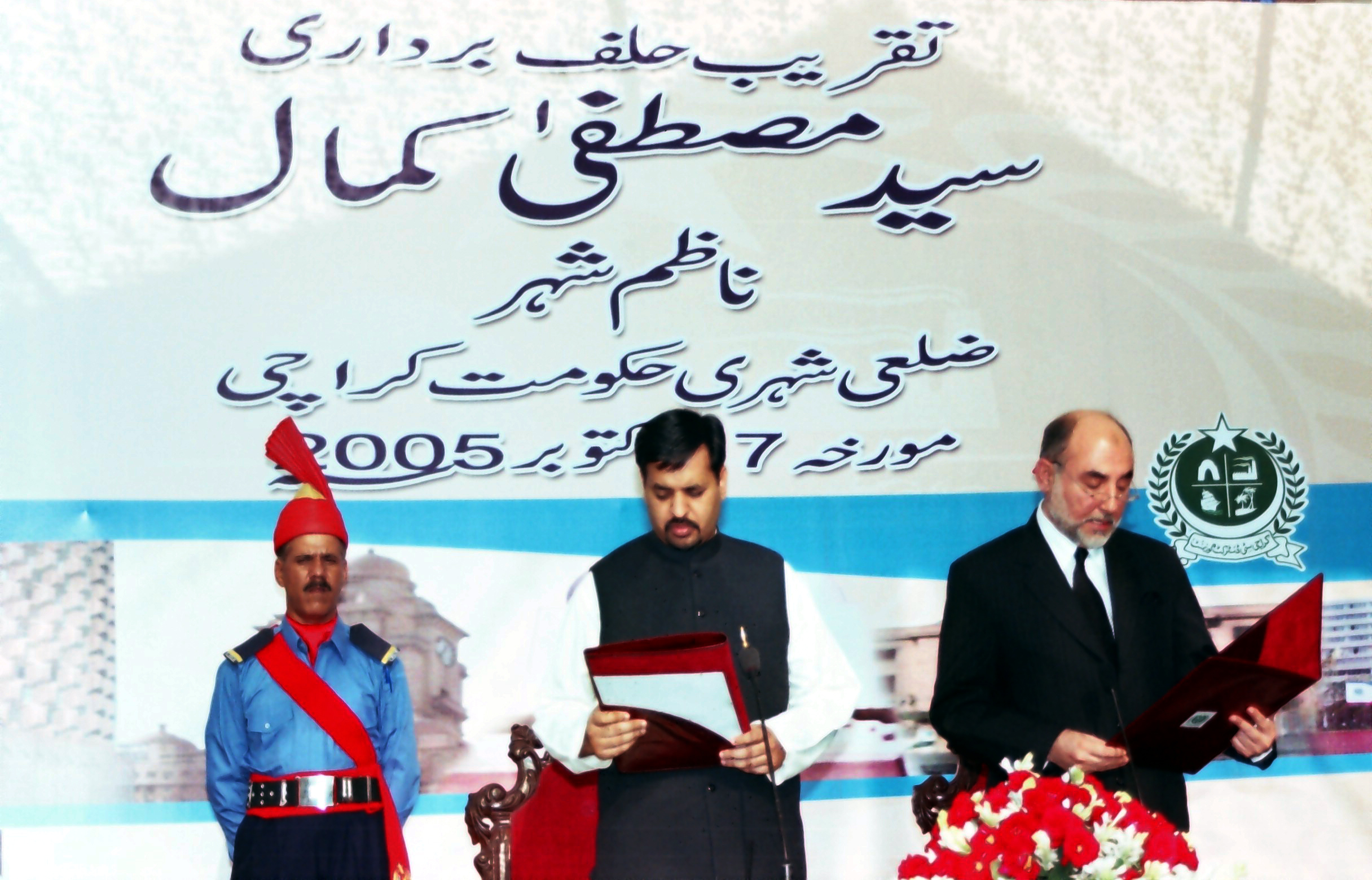
Mustafa Kamal taking oath as Mayor of Karachi

On 7 October 2005, Kamal was chosen as the mayor of Karachi.

In 2012, he was elected to the Pakistani Senate from Sindh from the ticket of MQM-L. In August 2013, he left the country, he formally resigned on 21 April 2014 from his seat and cited personal obligations behind his resignation.

=== Corruption Charges, Inquiry and Differences with MQM and departure ===
Kamal left Pakistan after developing differences with Altaf Hussain of the Muttahida Qaumi Movement announced that Syed Mustafa Kamal submitted his resignation from Senate seat and left Pakistan due to personal and family reasons. Later in Dubai Mustafa Kamal join Malik Riaz's Bahria Town and started managing Bahria Town's construction business from Dubai. In Dubai due to his difference with the party. He formed PSP with Anis Qaimkhani. He after leaving the political party, joined Malik Riaz’s company Bahria Town.

=== Comeback and formation of Pak Sarzameen Party ===
After leaving Pakistan in August 2013, he returned from Dubai to Karachi, Pakistan on 3 March 2016, accompanying Anis Kaimkhani and holding a press conference in a rented house in Karachi's posh area at Khayaban e Sahar in Defence Phase 6 Karachi on the same day at 3:00 PM.

In his famous press conference, Mustafa Kamal opened up about his lifelong personal experiences as a prominent member of Muttahida Qaumi Movement and what made him leave the country even when he was serving as a senator at the time. He discussed several controversies surrounding MQM, the leader Altaf Hussain and his behaviour towards the party members.

On 23 March 2016, In the conference, Kamal also disclosed the vision of a new party he is laying foundations of, the name of which is not decided yet. According to him, "Today we are laying the foundation of an organisation, you may call it a party. We are just two individuals, myself and Anis Kaimkhani." Kamal announced the name of party as Pak Sarzameen Party. He also revealed the flag of his party which turned out to be the Flag of Pakistan. He told that the PSP has a flag is not for public. In his support several individual have contacted and showed support and also few more members from MQM joined Mustafa Kamal's team. According to Anees Kaimkhani they will continue to welcome people. Syed Mustafa Kamal disclosed that they will organize a public speech at Bagh-e-Jinnah near Mazar-e-Quaid Karachi. Many people of MQM left it and joined PSP.

=== Merging PSP into MQM–P ===
On 12 January 2023, the Pak Sarzameen Party was dissolved and merged into Muttahida Qaumi Movement - Pakistan.

== Controversies and cases ==
=== China-Cutting Case ===
The Anti Corruption Establishment (ACE) registered an FIR against Kamal and 24 other PSP workers. ACE said that Kamal and 24 others were involved in illegal allotment of 82 acres of amenity land in Mehmoodabad in 2009. The inquiry of ACE was revealed in November 2017 which told that Kamal allotted state land by embezzling his powers. The ACE then questioned Kamal and then Kamal stated that he had allotted in good intentions around 49 acres to the affectees of Lines Area project and the present government could cancel the allotment. Kamal made it clear he had no links with the China-Cutting Case and he was not responsible for what happened in the case.

=== Illegal Allotment Case ===
National Accountability Bureau (NAB) filed a reference against Mustafa Kamal pertaining to the alleged illegal allotment of state-owned lands in Clifton, Block 3, near Sea View. According to the NAB's references, The land was allotted to hawkers and shopkeepers in 1980 which was later got by DG Builders on lease in 2005.

== Electoral history ==
=== General elections 2002 ===
In the 2002 Pakistani general elections, Syed Mustafa Kamal contested for the Provincial Assembly of Sindh seat PS-117 as a candidate of the MQM-L. He secured 37,671 votes and won the seat, becoming a Member of the Provincial Assembly of Sindh.

After a period of political divergence, Kamal rejoined the MQM-P. He is currently serving as a Member of the National Assembly of Pakistan, continuing his political career under the party's banner.

=== General elections 2018 ===
Kamal contested the 2018 Pakistan General Election for National Assembly and two Provincial Assemblies however; he failed to make it despite his claim to win the seat. People thought that PSP had ended but Kamal didn't give up hope and he still made a speech after elections saying PSP hasn't ended.

== Notes ==
Preceded by Naimatullah Khan	Mayors of Karachi	Succeeded by Post abolished;
