= Pak Sarzameen Party =

Defunct Pakistani political party

Pak Sarzameen Party پاک سر زمین پارٹی
- Abbreviation: PSP
- President: Anis Kaimkhani
- Chairperson: Syed Mustafa Kamal
- General Secretary: Hassaan Sabir
- Vice Chairman: Ashfaq Mangi
- Founders: Syed Mustafa Kamal; Anis Kaimkhani
- Founded: March 23, 2016
- Dissolved: January 12, 2023
- Split from: MQM-L
- Merged into: MQM-P
- Headquarters: Pakistan House, PECHS, Shahrah-e-Faisal, Karachi
- Student wing: Pak Sarzameen Students Federation (PSSF)
- Ideology: Pakistani nationalism Socialism
- Political position: Centre-left
- National affiliation: PDM
- Colors: Green, Blue, Red
- Slogan: Izzat – Insaf – Ikhtiyar (lit. 'Respect – Justice – Authority')

Election symbol

Party flag
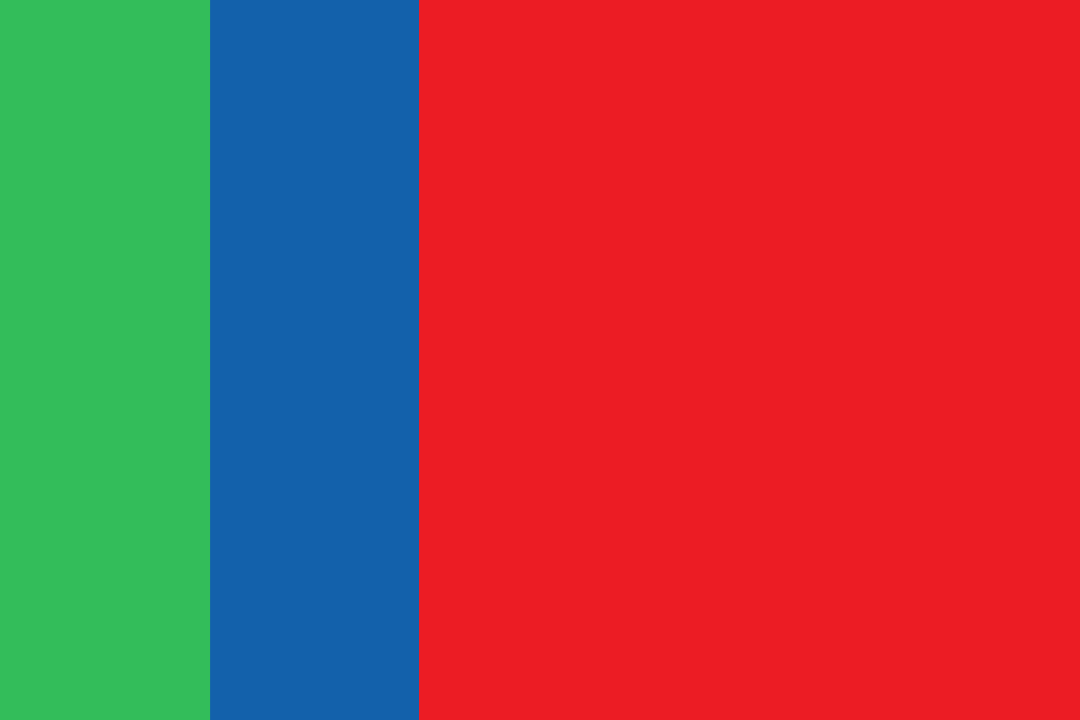

Website
- psp.org.pk

Pak Sarzameen Party (PSP; Urdu: پاک سر زمین پارٹی) was a Pakistani political party founded by Syed Mustafa Kamal and Anis Kaimkhani on 23 March 2016. Ashfaq Mangi, Hassan Sabir, Iftikhar Alam and Shabbir Qaimkhani were senior members of the party. It merged into Muttahida Qaumi Movement – Pakistan on 12 January 2023.

The party headquarters were in Pakistan House which is in Karachi.

== History ==
=== Return of Syed Mustafa Kamal and Anis Kaimkhani ===
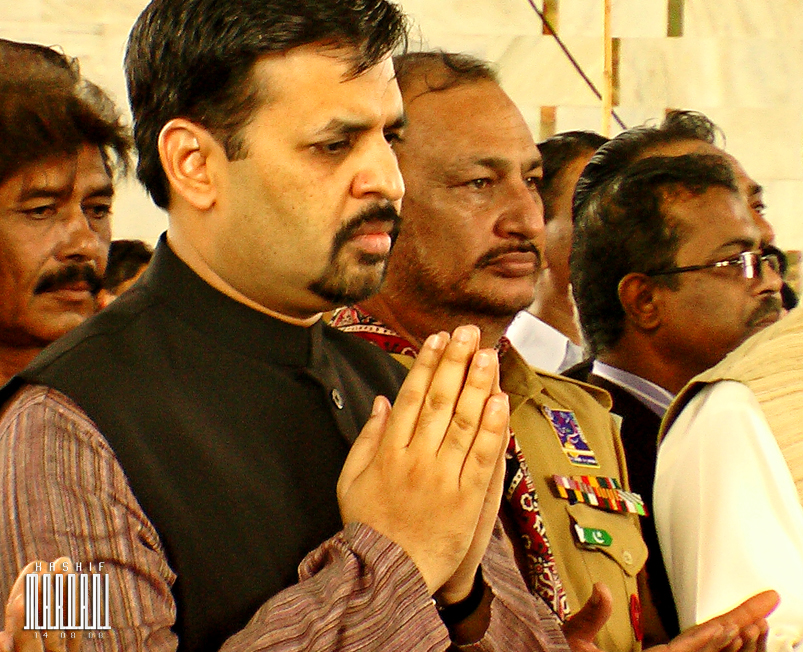
Syed Mustafa Kamal, former chairman of PSP

On 3 March 2016, Syed Mustafa Kamal and Anis Kaimkhani returned to Karachi to conduct a press conference. He announced his new political party without revealing the new name of the party. Then on 23 March 2016, Syed Mustafa Kamal and Anis Kaimkhani conducted a press conference in Clifton, Karachi. Three names were suggested, "Pak Sarzameen Party", "Pakistan Qaumi Party"

Later on the party was joined by former MQM members and many other MNA's and MPA's. MQM accused the party for working under the patronage of Sindh Rangers in order to threaten MQM workers to join PSP or face arrest.

PSP's founder and chairman Mustafa Kamal has stated that he has recovered MQM's missing persons but MQM alleges that those missing persons were arrested by paramilitary forces of Sindh Rangers.

The PSP president Anis Kaimkhani was arrested by Law enforcement in connection to Baldia Factory fire case. He was later on released on bail.

== Constitution ==
The Party had a published constitution. Their slogan was Izzat – Insaf – Ikhtiyar (Respect – Justice – Authority).

== Electoral history ==
Election	Votes	Seats	+/–	Source
2018	126,128	0 / 342	Steady	ECP

=== 2018 Elections ===
PSP participated in the 2018 Pakistan general elections. However, they failed to achieve a seat in the National Assembly as well as in the Provincial Assembly's of Pakistan.

In an interview, Mustafa Kamal told that the elections were not fair and told the whole process of the elections.

== PSP Office attack ==
The PSP Office was attacked on 24 December 2018. Two PSP workers were killed and many people got injured. The Rescue teams came to the PSP Office and took them to the hospital. The injured were said to be in negative and critical condition. After the attack Syed Ali Raza Abidi died and Syed Mustafa Kamal said that PSP Office attack and Ali Raza Abidi attack were linked together. The biggest suspect was Altaf Hussain, who has been accused of terrorism many times.

== Merger with MQM ==
On 12 January 2023, Syed Mustafa Kamal (the founder of PSP) announced that his party would merge with MQM-P ahead of the 2023 local government elections of Sindh.

== See also ==
- Syed Mustafa Kamal
- Anis Kaimkhani
- Mohajir Qaumi Movement – Haqiqi
- Muttahida Qaumi Movement – Pakistan
- Muttahida Qaumi Movement – London
