= Ittehad Town =

Residential neighbourhood in Karachi

Coordinates: 24°57′N 66°58′E

Ittehad Town (Urdu: اتحاد ٹاؤن) is a residential neighbourhood in the Mauripur Town of Keamari District of Karachi, Pakistan.

== Lack of Government Facilities ==
The area faces shortages of clean drinking water and electricity, and road conditions are poor.
