= Pride of Performance Awards (1972–1999) =

Pride of Performance (Urdu: تمغۂ حسنِ کارکردگی) is a civil award given by the Government of Pakistan to Pakistani citizens in recognition of distinguished merit in the fields of literature, arts, sports, medicine, or science for civilians

== 1974 ==
- Iqbal Bano (ghazal and film singer)

== 1976 ==
- Parveen Shakir

== 1977 ==
- Salamat Ali Khan (classical musician of Sham Chaurasia gharana)

== 1978 ==
Name	Field	Specialization	Province	Country
Molvi Ahmed Mallah	Literature	Poet	Sindh	Pakistan
Ibn-e-Insha	Literature	Poet and Writer	Punjab	Pakistan
Ahmed Parvez	Arts	Painting	Punjab	Pakistan
Ustad Manzoor Ali Khan	Singing	Classical Music	Sindh	Pakistan
Sabri Brothers	Arts	Sufi Qawwali Group	Sindh	Pakistan
Ameer Hamza Shinwari	Literature	Poetry	Khyber Pakhtunkhwa	Pakistan
Munir Sarhadi	Singing	Music	Khyber Pakhtunkhwa	Pakistan
Ameer Hamza Shinwari	Literature	Poetry	Khyber Pakhtunkhwa	Pakistan

== 1979 ==
Name	Field	Specialization	Province	Country
Faiz Mohammad Baloch	Arts	Folk Singer	Balochistan	Pakistan
Khamiso Khan	Arts	Music	Sindh	Pakistan
Kishwar Sultan	Arts	Music	Khyber Pakhtunkhwa	Pakistan
Hakim Mohammad Yusuf Hasan	Literature	Writing	Punjab	Pakistan
Nabi Bakhsh Khan Baloch	Literature	Writing	Sindh	Pakistan
Ashfaq Ahmad	Literature	Writing	Punjab	Pakistan
Qalandar Momand	Literature	Writing	Khyber Pakhtunkhwa	Pakistan
Ghulam Ali	Arts	Singing	Punjab	Pakistan
Alam Lohar	Arts	Music	Punjab	Pakistan
Mureed Buledi	Arts	Music	Balochistan	Pakistan
Misri Khan Jamali	Arts	Music	Sindh	Pakistan
Pathane Khan	Arts	Music	Punjab	Pakistan
Mohammad Azam Chishti	Art	Naat Reciting	Punjab	Pakistan

== 1980 ==
Name	Field	Specialization	Province	Country
Mohammad Qavi Khan	Arts	Film and TV Actor	Punjab	Pakistan
Ustad Khyal Muhammad	Arts	Singing	Khyber Pakhtunkhwa	Pakistan
Allan Faqir	Arts	Sufi music and folk singer	Sindh	Pakistan
Sohail Rana	Arts	Music composer	Sindh	Pakistan
Azar Zubi	Arts	Painter Artist	Sindh	Pakistan
Muhammad Juman	Arts	Folk music singer	Sindh	Pakistan
Malika Pukhraj	Arts	Folk music singer	Punjab	Pakistan
Khalid Iqbal	Arts	Painter Artist	Punjab	Pakistan

== 1981 ==
Name	Field	Specialization	Province	Country
Mirza Adeeb	Literature	Writer	Punjab	Pakistan
Nasir Jahan	Arts	Naat, Hamd & Noha Reciting on TV	Sindh	Pakistan
Mir Mitha Khan Marri	Literature	Writer	Balochistan	Pakistan
Qari Shakir Qasmi	Arts	Quran Recitor	Sindh	Pakistan
Mansoor Tabish	Arts	Naat Reciting on TV	Punjab	Pakistan
Qari Syed Ali Sharfuddin Yemni	Arts	Naat Reciting		Pakistan
Ustad Imam Deen Salehi				Pakistan
Nanhe Ali Khan	Arts	Music	Punjab	Pakistan
Roohi Bano	Arts	TV Actress	Sindh	Pakistan
Mai Bhagi	Arts	Folk Singer	Sindh	Pakistan
Majid Jahangir	Arts	Actor - TV comedian	Sindh	Pakistan

== 1982 ==
Name	Field	Specialization	Province	Country
Uzma Gillani	Arts	TV actress	Sindh	Pakistan
Qari Ubaidur Rehman	Arts	Naat Reciting on TV	Punjab	Pakistan
Talat Hussain	Arts	TV and film actor	Sindh	Pakistan
Tufail Niazi	Arts	Folk singer	Punjab	Pakistan
Islahuddin Siddique	Sports	Hockey	Sindh	Pakistan
Jahangir Khan	Sports	Squash player	Sindh	Pakistan
Byram D. Avari	Sports	Sailing	Sindh	Pakistan
Sheikh Inayatullah	Literature	Writer	Punjab	Pakistan
Nazir Ahmed Sabir	Sports	Mountaineering	Gilgit-Baltistan	Pakistan
Ashraf Aman	Sports	Mountaineering	Gilgit-Baltistan	Pakistan

== 1983 ==
Name	Field	Specialization	Province	Country
Imran Khan	Sports	Cricket player	Punjab	Pakistan
Akhtar Rasool	Sports	Hockey player	Punjab	Pakistan
Samiullah Khan	Sports	Hockey player	Punjab	Pakistan
Arsh Muneer	Arts	TV Actress	Sindh	Pakistan
Ustad Nazar Hussain	Arts	Music Composer on PTV	Punjab	Pakistan
Malcolm Stevenson Forbes	Sports	Ballooning	New Jersey State	United States
Atta Shad	Literature	Poetry	Balochistan	Pakistan

== 1984 ==
Name	Field	Specialization	Province	Country
Rais Amrohvi	Literature	Poetry	Sindh	Pakistan
Zameer Jafri	Literature	Poet	Punjab	Pakistan
Samandar Khan Samandar	Literature	Poet	Khyber Pakhtunkhwa	Pakistan
Qari Waheed Zafar Qasmi	Arts	TV Naat Reciting	Punjab	Pakistan
Manzoor Hussain Junior	Sports	Hockey player	Punjab	Pakistan
Hasan Sardar	Sports	Hockey player	Punjab	Pakistan
Kaleemullah Khan	Sports	Hockey player	Punjab	Pakistan
Hanif Khan	Sports	Hockey player	Punjab	Pakistan
Qamar Zaman	Sports	Squash player	Balochistan	Pakistan
Begum Khursheed Mirza	Arts	TV Actress	Punjab	Pakistan
Abida Parveen	Arts	Sufi music and folk singer	Sindh	Pakistan
Mohammad Ali	Arts	Film Actor	Punjab	Pakistan

== 1985 ==
Name	Field	Specialization	Province	Country
Sayed Nafees al-Hussaini	Art	Calligraphy	Punjab	Pakistan
Chhote Ghulam Ali Khan	Arts	Music	Punjab	Pakistan
Mehdi Hassan	Arts	Film and TV Singer	Sindh	Pakistan
Qari Ghulam Rasool	Arts	Recitation of Quranic Verses	Punjab	Pakistan
Siddiq Ismail	Arts	Naat Reciting on TV	Punjab	Pakistan
Abid Ali	Arts	TV Actor	Punjab	Pakistan
Mahmood Ali	Arts	TV Actor	Sindh	Pakistan
Major Mohammad Sher Khan	Sports	Mountaineering	Punjab	Pakistan
Mian Shaukat Hussain	Arts	Tabla player	Punjab	Pakistan

== 1986 ==
Name	Field	Specialization	Province	Country
Intezar Hussain	Literature	Writer	Sindh	Pakistan
Sabiha Khanum	Arts	Film Actress	Punjab	Pakistan
Shahzad Khalil	Arts	Television Director	Sindh	Pakistan
Ghulam Rasul	Hockey player		Punjab	Pakistan
Suraiya Multanikar	Arts	Folk Singer	Punjab	Pakistan
Firdous Jamal	Arts	TV Actor	Khyber Pakhtunkhwa	Pakistan
Faiz Bakhshapuri	Literature	Poetry	Sindh	Pakistan
Riaz Batalvi	Literature	Writer	Punjab	Pakistan
Nusrat Fateh Ali Khan	Arts	Qawwali Singer	Punjab	Pakistan
Azhar Lodhi	Arts	TV Newscaster	Punjab	Pakistan
Javed Miandad	Sports	Cricket player	Sindh	Pakistan
Zaheer Abbas	Sports	Cricket player	Sindh	Pakistan
Abdul Jabbar Bhatti	Sports	Mountaineering	Punjab	Pakistan
Mohammad Ali	Sports	Mountaineering	Punjab	Pakistan

== 1987 ==
Name	Field	Specialization	Province	Country
Ustad Abdul Majeed Dehlvi	Arts	Calligraphy	Sindh	Pakistan
Lieutenant Commander Muneer Sadiq	Sports	Sailing	Punjab	Pakistan
Lieutenant Mohammad Zakaullah	Sports	Sailing	Punjab	Pakistan
Haseena Moin	Arts	TV Dramatist and writer	Sindh	Pakistan
Adil Salahuddin	Arts	Postage Stamp designer	Punjab	Pakistan
Qazi Mulla	Arts	Pashto Drama	Khyber Pakhtunkhwa	Pakistan
Sain Akhtar Hussain	Arts	Folk music singer	Punjab	Pakistan
Qari Izhar Ahmed Thanvi	Arts	Reciting of Quranic verses	Punjab	Pakistan
Amjad Islam Amjad	Literature	TV Dramatist and poet	Punjab	Pakistan
Abdul Majeed Maruwala	Sports	Wrestling	Punjab	Pakistan

== 1988 ==
Name	Field	Specialization	Province	Country
Jansher Khan	Sports	Squash Legend	Khyber Pakhtunkhwa	Pakistan
Shaista Zaid	Arts	TV Newscaster	Punjab	Pakistan
Abdul Qadir Junejo	Literature	Writing	Sindh	Pakistan
Mustafa Qureshi	Arts	Film Actor	Sindh	Pakistan
Qazi Wajid	Arts	Film/Drama Actor	Punjab	Pakistan
Muzaffar Warsi	Literature	Poet and Naat Reciter	Punjab	Pakistan
Mushfiq Khwaja	Literature	Poet, Researcher and Translator	Punjab, Pakistan	Pakistan
Fayyaz Ahmed				Pakistan
A.J. Khan				Pakistan
Mohammad Rafiq Ahmed				Pakistan
Akhtar Hussain Awan	Academic		Punjab	Pakistan
Shah Jehan	Sports	Mountaineering	Gilgit-Baltistan	Pakistan
Zia Mahmood	Sports	Bridge		Pakistan
Abul Wafa				Pakistan
Intikhab Alam	Sports	Cricket player	Punjab	Pakistan
Abdul Qadir	Sports	Cricket player	Punjab	Pakistan
Nasir Ali	Sports	Hockey player	Punjab	Pakistan
Ghulam Hassan Shaggan	Arts	Classical Music singer	Punjab	Pakistan

- Most of the nomination process of the Pride of Performance Awards was cancelled due to the change of Government in 1989.

== 1989 ==
Name	Field	Specialization	Province	Country
Ustad Kabir Khan	Arts	Music - Sitar Playing	Punjab	Pakistan
G.A. Chishti	Arts	Film Music Composer	Punjab	Pakistan
Musarrat Nazir	Arts	Film Actress	Punjab	Pakistan
Shafi Mohammad Shah	Arts	Actor	Sindh	Pakistan
Kamal Ahmed Rizvi	Arts	TV Dramatist and TV actor	Sindh	Pakistan
Jameel Bismil	Arts	TV Actor	Punjab	Pakistan
Bushra Ansari	Arts	TV Actress	Sindh	Pakistan
Amir Khan	Arts	Radio Drama Artist		Pakistan
Amjad Hussain	Arts			Pakistan
Aziz Mian	Arts	Sufi music and Qawwali singer	Punjab	Pakistan
Agha Talish	Arts	Film Actor	Punjab	Pakistan
Maharaj Ghulam Hussain Kathak	Arts	Dancing	Punjab	Pakistan
Mudassar Nazar	Sports	Cricket player	Punjab	Pakistan
Anwar Sajjad	Literature	Writer	Punjab	Pakistan
Khawar Naeem Hashmi	Arts	TV Journalist		Pakistan
Iqbal Jafri				Pakistan
Nasir Zaidi	Writer	Journalist	Punjab	Pakistan
Ustad Nusrat Fateh Ali Khan	Arts	Sufi music and Qawwali singer	Punjab	Pakistan
Jamil Naqsh	Arts	Painter Artist	Sindh	Pakistan

== 1990 ==
Name	Field	Specialization	Province	Country
Saleem Nasir	Arts	Acting	Sindh	Pakistan
Daud Kamal	Literature	Poetry	Khyber Pakhtunkhwa	Pakistan
Abdullah Jan Jamaldini	Literature	Linguistics	Baluchistan	Pakistan
Khalid Hameed	Arts	Newscaster	Punjab	Pakistan
Shaukat Ali	Arts	Folk music	Punjab	Pakistan
Ustad Sadiq Ali Khan Mando	Arts	Music	Punjab	Pakistan
Ustad Hameed Ali Khan	Arts	Music	Sindh	Pakistan
Fateh Ali Khan	Arts	Music (classical music Gwalior gharana)	Sindh	Pakistan
Zarsanga	Arts	Music	NWFP	Pakistan
Ahmed Nabi Khan	Literature	Writing	Punjab	Pakistan
Parveen Shakir	Literature	Poetry	Sindh	Pakistan
Iftikhar Arif	Literature	Poetry	Sindh	Pakistan
Taj Muhammad Sahrai	Literature	Writing	Sindh	Pakistan
Dhol Faqeer	Arts	Music	Sindh	Pakistan
Ahmed Saeed Nagi	Arts	Painting	Sindh	Pakistan
Qari Mohammad Fida	Arts	Quran Reciting	Punjab	Pakistan
Honorary Lieutenant Muhammad Younis	Sports	Athletics	Punjab	Pakistan
Arif Khan	Sports	Table tennis	Punjab	Pakistan
Nazo Anwar Miandad	Sports	Table tennis	Punjab	Pakistan
Mohammad Shehnaz Sheikh	Sports	Hockey	Punjab	Pakistan
Ibrahim Jalees	Journalist and humorist	Newspaper columnist	Sindh	Pakistan

== 1991 ==
Name	Field	Specialization	Province	Country
Ataul Haq Qasmi	Literature	Writing	Punjab	Pakistan
Bashir Hussain Nazim	Literature	Writing	Punjab	Pakistan
Qaisar Farooq	Arts	TV Director of PTV drama series 'Aangan Terha'	Sindh	Pakistan
Khayyam Sarhadi	Arts	Acting	Punjab	Pakistan
Attaullah Khan Essa Khailwi	Arts	Music	Punjab	Pakistan
Noor Muhammad Butt	Science	Mathematician	Khyber Pakhtunkwa	Pakistan
Hafeez Qureshi	Science	Nuclear science	Sindh	Pakistan
Jafar Naqvi	Science	Nephrology	Sindh	Pakistan
Jamiluddin Aali	Literature	Poetry	Sindh	Pakistan

== 1992 ==
Name	Field	Specialization	Province	Country
Raza Hamdani	Science	Gastroenterology	Punjab	Pakistan
Muneer Niazi	Literature	Poetry	Punjab	Pakistan
Naseem Hijazi	Literature	Writer	Punjab	Pakistan
Nayyar Ali Dada	Arts	Architect	Punjab	Pakistan
Atta-ur-Rahman	Arts	Educationist	Sindh	Pakistan
Mushtaq Gazdar	Arts	Film producer/director, Cinematographer and Film historian	Sindh	Pakistan
Ahmed Nabi Khan	Literature	Writing	Punjab	Pakistan
Mustansar Hussain Tarar	Literature	Writer	Punjab	Pakistan
Shakeel (Yousuf Kamal)	Arts	Acting	Sindh	Pakistan
Noor Mohammad Lashari	Arts	Acting	Sindh	Pakistan
Tariq Aziz	Arts	TV artist	Punjab	Pakistan
Pervez Malik	Arts	Film director	Punjab	Pakistan
Jawed Iqbal	Arts	Cartoonist	Punjab	Pakistan
Wasim Akram	Sports	Cricket	Punjab	Pakistan
Shahbaz Ahmed	Sports	Hockey	Punjab	Pakistan
Mian Ijazul Hasan	Arts	Painting	Punjab	Pakistan
Ghulam Abbas	Sports	Athletics	Punjab	Pakistan
Taimur Hasan	Sports	Golf	Punjab	Pakistan
Shahid Ali Khan	Sports	Hockey	Sindh	Pakistan
Khursheed Alam Gohar Qalam	Arts	Calligraphy	Punjab	Pakistan

== 1993 ==
Name	Field	Specialization	Province	Country
Waheed Qureshi	Literature	Writing	Punjab	Pakistan
Mushfiq Khwaja	Literature	Writing	Punjab	Pakistan
Saeed Akhtar	Arts	Painter Artist	Punjab	Pakistan
Aksi Mufti	Arts	Folk music	Sindh	Pakistan
Agha Nasir	Literature	Playwright, Dramatist, Pioneer of PTV and Pakistan Television Corporation Executive	Sindh	Pakistan
Ismail Shahid	Arts	TV artist	Khyber Pakhtunkwa	Pakistan
Ali Ejaz	Arts	Acting	Punjab	Pakistan
S.H. Hashmi	Arts	Advertising	Sindh	Pakistan
Hassan Rizvi	Literature	Poetry	Punjab	Pakistan
Jamal Abro	Literature	Writer	Sindh	Pakistan
Atique Zafar Sheikh	Literature	Writing	Punjab	Pakistan
Qazi Muhibur Rehman	Sports	Hockey	Punjab	Pakistan
Qari Syed Buzurg Shah Al-Azhari	Arts	Quran Reciting	Punjab	Pakistan
Syed Manzoorul Kaunain	Arts	Naat Reciting	Punjab	Pakistan
Laeeq Ahmed	Arts	PTV news anchorperson		Pakistan
Rajab Shah	Sports	Mountaineering	Gilgit Baltistan	Pakistan
Farooq Qaiser	Arts	Puppeteering and TV comedian	Punjab	Pakistan

== 1994 ==
Name	Field	Specialization	Province	Country
Parto Rohilla	Literature	Writer	Punjab	Pakistan
Bashir Mirza	Arts	Painting	Punjab	Pakistan
Mohammad Yousuf	Sports	Snooker	Punjab	Pakistan
Saleh Mohammad Baloch				Pakistan
Murad Ali Mirza	Literature	Writer	Sindh	Pakistan
Moosa Kaleem	Science	Chemistry	Khyber Pakhtunkwa	Pakistan
Athar Masood	Literature	Journalism	Punjab	Pakistan
Mohsin Naqvi	Literature	Poetry	Punjab	Pakistan
Shahid Jalal	Arts	Painting	Punjab	Pakistan
Tufail Hoshiarpuri	Literature	Poetry	Punjab	Pakistan
Qari Syed Ali Abid Naqvi	Arts	Quran Reciting	Punjab	Pakistan
Qari Mohammad Younus	Arts	Naat Reciting	Punjab	Pakistan
Nisar Bazmi	Arts	Music composer	Sindh	Pakistan
Hamid Ali Bela	Arts	Folk music	Punjab	Pakistan
Zareena Baloch	Arts	Folk music	Sindh	Pakistan
Abdus Salam	Arts	Newscaster		Pakistan
Laeeq Ahmed	Arts	TV Broadcast Journalist	Punjab	Pakistan
Nahid Siddiqui	Arts	Classical dance	Punjab	Pakistan
Shujaat Hashmi	Arts	Acting	Punjab	Pakistan
Anwar Maqsood	Literature	Dramatist	Sindh	Pakistan
Mehr Abdul Haq	Literature	Linguist	Punjab	Pakistan
Qateel Shifai	Literature	Poetry	Punjab	Pakistan
Yousuf Shaheen				Pakistan
Farigh Bukhari	Literature	Poetry	Khyber Pakhtunkwa	Pakistan
Azhar Suhail	Literature	Journalism	Punjab	Pakistan
Zamir Niazi	Literature	Journalism	Punjab	Pakistan
Ahmad Bashir	Literature	Journalism	Punjab	Pakistan
Mohibullah Khan Junior	Sports	Squash	Khyber Pakhtunkwa	Pakistan
Khwaja Mohammad Junaid	Sports	Hockey	Punjab	Pakistan
Abdul Rashid	Sports	Hockey	Punjab	Pakistan
Muhammad Saeed Khan	Sports	Hockey	Punjab	Pakistan
Mansoor Ahmed	Sports	Hockey	Punjab	Pakistan
Ahmed Alam	Sports	Hockey	Punjab	Pakistan
Tahir Zaman	Sports	Hockey	Punjab	Pakistan
Muhammad Shahbaz	Sports	Hockey	Punjab	Pakistan
Muhammad Shafqat	Sports	Hockey	Punjab	Pakistan
Irfan Mehmood	Sports	Hockey	Punjab	Pakistan
Naveed Alam	Sports	Hockey	Punjab	Pakistan
Asif Bajwa	Sports	Hockey	Punjab	Pakistan
Muhammad Danish Kaleem	Sports	Hockey	Punjab	Pakistan
Muhammad Usman	Sports	Hockey	Punjab	Pakistan
Kamran Ashraf	Sports	Hockey	Punjab	Pakistan
Rahim Khan	Sports	Hockey	Punjab	Pakistan
Rana Mujahid Ali	Sports	Hockey	Punjab	Pakistan
Waseem Feroze	Sports	Hockey	Punjab	Pakistan

== 1995 ==
Name	Field	Specialization Literature	Province	Country
Ustad Allah Rakha (sarangi)	Arts	Music (sarangi player)	Punjab	Pakistan
Ustad Talib Hussain Khan	Arts	Music	Punjab	Pakistan
Colin David	Arts	Painting	Punjab	Pakistan
Shoaib Hashmi	Arts	Dramatist	Punjab	Pakistan
Begum Khursheed Shahid	Arts	Acting	Sindh	Pakistan
Hajra Masroor	Literature	Writer	Punjab	Pakistan
Zaheer Kashmiri	Literature	Poetry	Punjab	Pakistan
Aliya Rasheed	Sports	Tennis	Punjab	Pakistan
Fareed Sehrai				Pakistan
Waqar Younis	Sports	Cricket	Punjab	Pakistan
Ali Nawaz Baloch	Sports	Football	Sindh	Pakistan
Rauf Khalid	TV playwright	Television and Films	Khyber Pakhtunkhwa	Pakistan
Mohammad Sarwar	Sports	Wrestling	Punjab	Pakistan
Azhar Suhail	Arts	Journalist	Punjab	Pakistan
Laila Shahzada	Arts	Painter Artist	Punjab	Pakistan
Professor Faiz Mahmood Khan	Science	Medicine	Sindh	Pakistan

== 1996 ==
Name	Field	Specialization	Province	Country
Ahmad Ali Khan	Arts	Journalism - newspaper editor of Dawn newspaper	Sindh	Pakistan
Mashooq Sultan	Arts	Singing	Khyber Pakhtunkwa	Pakistan
Lehri	Arts	Acting	Sindh	Pakistan
Ejaz Anwar				Pakistan
Qari Noor Mohammad	Arts	Quran Reciting	Punjab	Pakistan
Khursheed Ahmad	Arts	Naat reciting	Sindh	Pakistan
Rubina Khalid	Arts	Quran Reciting	Punjab	Pakistan
Fatima Surayya Bajia	Literature	Writer	Sindh	Pakistan
Sitar Tahir	Literature	Writing	Punjab	Pakistan
Mohammad Ali Shah (surgeon)	Medical	Surgery	Karachi	Pakistan
Sehba Akhtar	Literature	Poetry	Sindh	Pakistan
Zaitoon Bano	Literature	Poetry	Khyber Pakhtunkwa	Pakistan
Afzal Ahsan Randhawa	Arts	Writer, Novelist	Punjab	Pakistan
Anis Khurshid				Pakistan
Zahoor Ahmed				Pakistan
Asghar Ali Changezi	Sports	Boxing	Sindh	Pakistan
Professor Kaleemuddin Aziz	Science	Cardiology	Sindh	Pakistan
Sardar Azmarai Javaid Hissam el-Effendi	Sports	Polo	Gilgit Baltistan	Pakistan
Ghulam Noorani Khan	Sports	Athletics	Punjab	Pakistan

== 1997 ==
Name	Field	Specialization	Province	Country
Nadeem Baig	Arts	Acting	Sindh	Pakistan
Abdul Hameed	Arts	writer, playwright of TV dramas	Punjab	Pakistan
Ahmed Ghulam Ali Chagla	Arts	Musician (composed music for Pakistan's National Anthem)	Sindh	Pakistan
Ahmad Rahi	Arts	Poet of both Urdu and Punjabi languages Film songs lyricist	Punjab	Pakistan

== 1998 ==
Name	Field	specialization	Province	Country
Mumtaz Mirza	Arts	Painter Artist	Sindh	Pakistan
Akhtar Chanal Zahri	Arts	Folk singer	Balochistan	Pakistan

== 1999 ==
Name	Field	Specialization	Province	Country
Nazir Ahmed	Education	Education	Sindh	Pakistan
Bashir Ahmad	Medicine	neurosurgery	Punjab	Pakistan
Anwar Masood	literature	Poetry	Punjab	Pakistan
Anita Ghulam Ali	Education	Education	Sindh	Pakistan
Khatir Ghaznavi	Literature	Poetry	NWFP	Pakistan
Qari Abdul Majid Noor	Arts	Quran reciting	Punjab	Pakistan
Marghoob Ahmad Hamdani	Arts	Naat Reciting	Punjab	Pakistan
Muhammad Ali Zahoori	Arts	Naat Reciting	Punjab	Pakistan
Amjad Parvez	Arts	Music critic, Newspaper columnist	Punjab	Pakistan
Hamid ul Haq	Sports	Tennis	NWFP	Pakistan
Raza Mir	Arts	Film director, Cinematographer	Punjab	Pakistan
Subhani ba Yunus	Arts	Acting	Sindh	Pakistan
Faqir Husain Saga	Arts	Dance	Sindh	Pakistan
Rehmat Ali Razi	Literature	Journalism	Punjab	Pakistan
Zafar Iqbal (poet)	Literature	Urdu poetry	Punjab	Pakistan
Mashkoor Hussain Yaad	Literature	Writer	Punjab	Pakistan
Dilawar Figar	Literature	Poetry	Sindh	Pakistan
Suhrab Faqir	Arts	Folk Music	Sindh	Pakistan
Jameel ur Rehman	Literature	Journalism	Islamabad	Pakistan
Zulqurnain Haider	Arts	Painting	Punjab	Pakistan
Khalid Abbas Dar	Arts	TV Comedian	Punjab	Pakistan
Salima Hashmi	Arts	educationist	Punjab	Pakistan
Mujahid Kamran	Science	Physics	Punjab	Pakistan
Mohammed Naseer Khan	Science	Physics	NWFP	Pakistan
