= Pride of Performance Awards (2010–2019) =

The Pride of Performance (Urdu: تمغۂ حسنِ کارکردگی) is a civil award given by the Government of Pakistan to Pakistani citizens in recognition of distinguished merit in the fields of literature, arts, sports, medicine or science.

== 2010 ==
In 2009, the following list of recipients was announced. Awards were actually conferred by the President of Pakistan on Pakistan Day (23 March 2010).

Name	Field	Specialization	Territory/Country
Sattar Shabbir	Social science	Economist/policy maker	Punjab
Atta Muhammad Kakar	Sports	Sports	Balochistan
Ayaz Ayub	Science	Electrical engineering	Punjab
Muhammad Javed Akhtar	Mining engineering		Punjab
Muhammad Saleem Khan (Saleem Raz)	Literature	Poetry	Khyber Pakhtunkhwa
Inam-ul-Haq Javeid	Literature	Poetry	Punjab
Muhammad Azam Azam	Literature	Literature	Khyber Pakhtunkhwa
Rabia Zuberi	Art	Education and sculpture	Sindh
Riaz Alam Khan	Science	Aerospace engineering	Sindh

== 2011 ==
On 14 August 2010, the following list of recipients was announced. Awards were actually conferred by the President of Pakistan on Pakistan Day (23 March 2011). The recipients included 46 resident Pakistanis and one Canadian of Pakistani origin.

Name	Field	Specialization	Territory/Country
Ahmad Salim (Muhammad Saleem Khawaja)	Literature	Literary researcher, literary historian, author, archivist and journalist	Punjab
Aleem Dar	Sports	Cricket umpiring	Punjab
Amjad Pervez	Science	Laser optics	Punjab
Anwar Saleem Ahmad	Literature		Azad Jammu and Kashmir
Ashfaq Hussain	Literature		Canada
Khalida Inayat Noor	Science	Mathematics	Punjab
Mubashir Ahmed Sheikh	Science	Metallurgical engineering	Punjab
Muhammad Arshad	Science	Nuclear engineering	Punjab
Muhammad Nazar	Science	Physics	Punjab
Shafqat Karim	Science	Physics	Khyber Pakhtunkhwa
Shahzad Mahmood	Science	Plasma physics	Punjab
Sumeera Ikram	Science	Chemistry	Punjab
Syed Tajammal Hussain	Science	Nano technology	Islamabad
Ghani Parwaz	Literature	Poet/author	Balochistan
Goshpi Byram Avari	Sports	Sailing/yachting	Sindh
Gulzar Ahmed Sheikh	Science	Underground mining engineering	Punjab
Habib	Art	Film and TV actor	Punjab
Hashim Nadeem	Literature	Medical	Balochistan
Iqbal Javed Khan	Science	Experimental aerodynamics engineering	Punjab
Ishan Ullah Qazi	Science	Chemistry	Khyber Pakhtunkhwa
Javaid Ahsan Bhatti	Science	Vacuum science and technology	Punjab
Khalid Ahmad	Literature		Punjab
Khan Tehsil	Art	Folk singing	Khyber Pakhtunkhwa
Manzoor Akhter (Tehsin Firaqi)	Literature		Punjab
Muhammad Afzal Arain	Science	Agriculture	Sindh
Muhammad Ahmed	Science	Electronics engineering	Sindh
Muhammad Aslam	Science	Mechanical engineering	Punjab
Muhammad Khalid Zahid	Science	Electrical engineering	Balochistan
Naseem Hameed	Sports	Athletics	Sindh
Abdul Rahim Nagori	Art	Painting	Sindh
Muhammad Nawaz	Science	Pharmacokinetics	Punjab
Muhammad Rasul Jan	Science	Chemistry	Khyber Pakhtunkhwa
S. Amjad Bukhari	Art	TV producer	Islamabad
S. B. John	Art	Film playback singing	Sindh
S.H. Qasim Jalali	Art	TV drama production	Sindh
Saif-ur-Rehman Saifi	Literature	Poetry	Punjab
Saleem Akram Ansari	Science	Nuclear Engineering	Punjab
Samina Ahmed	Art	TV drama acting	Punjab
Shahid Pervaiz Butt	Sports	Wrestling	Punjab
Shams Malik	Literature	Journalism	Punjab
Suhail Akram (Suhail Ahmed)	Art	TV drama acting	Punjab
Tajdar Alam	Art	Film/TV Direction	Khyber Pakhtunkhwa
Ustad Hussain Bukhsh Gullu	Art	Classical music singer	Punjab
Ustad Muhammad Alam	Art	Blue pottery	Punjab
Ustad Sharafat Ali Khan	Art	Classical singing (oldest son of Salamat Ali Khan)	Punjab
Wazir Afzal	Art	Film music composer	Punjab
Zafar Kazmi	Art	Painting and sculpture	Sindh
Moin Akhter	Art	TV artist/comedian	Sindh

== 2012 ==
On 14 August 2011, the following list of recipients was announced for awards to be actually conferred on 23 March 2012. It consists of 43 individuals.

Name	Field	Specialization	Territory/Country
Raja Shahid Nazir	Science	Mechanical engineering	Punjab
Abdul Hamid	Science	Physics	Punjab
Sajjad Ahmad Mehmood	Science	Chemical engineering	Punjab
Ghulam Hussain	Science	Mechanical engineering	Punjab
Mirza Zafarul Islam	Science	Geology	Punjab
Muhammad Aqil-ur-Rahman	Science	Physics	Punjab
Sameeullah Khan	Science	Mechanical engineering	Khyber Pakhtunkhwa
Rashid Ahmed Alvi	Science	Chemistry	Punjab
Muhammad Ibrahim	Science	Physics	Punjab
Muhammad Zaman	Science	Telecommunication engineering	Punjab
Muhammad Amjad Siddique Almas	Geo-spatial technologies	Military applications	Punjab
Tariq Aziz Khan	Science	Electronics engineering	Sindh
Irfan Ahmad	Science	Electrical engineering	Punjab
Muhammad Imran	Science	Microwave science	Punjab
Tasleem Baig	Science	Aerospace engineering	Punjab
Shakeel Zahid	Science	Aerospace engineering (satellite technology)	Punjab
Waqas Masood	Science	Physics	Punjab
Waqas Umer	Science	Electroninc engineering	Punjab
Mehboob-ur-Rehman	Science	Plant breeding and genetics	Punjab
Syed Tauseef Mohyud-Din	Science	Mathematics/physical sciences	Punjab
Farzana Suleman	Education		Sindh
Muhammad Sharif Tahir	Education		Punjab
Gulzar Alam	Music (singer)		Khyber Pakhtunkhwa
Ejaz Hussain Hazarvi	Music	Performing arts	Punjab
Shigeyuki Ataka	Arts and literature		Japan
Sahira Kazmi	Art	TV drama director	Pakistan
Mohsin Gillani	Art	TV drama actor	Pakistan
Noman Ijaz	Art	TV drama actor	Pakistan
Saba Hameed	Art	TV drama actress	Pakistan
Meera	Art	Film actress	Pakistan
Kazim Pasha	Art	TV director/producer	Pakistan
Javed Sheikh	Art	Film actor/director	Pakistan
Rahat Naveed Masud	Art	Fine arts	Punjab
Azhar Javed	Literature		Punjab
Tariq Khurshid Malik	Literature		Punjab
Lutfullah Khan	Literature/music archives	Large Music Archives Library	Sindh
Muhammad Aman (Sarshar Siddiqui)	Literature		Sindh
Zahida Hina	Literature	Journalism	Sindh
Khawaja Muhammad Zakariya	Literature		Punjab
Mohammad Yousuf	Sports	Cricket	Pakistan
Qasim Zia	Sports	Hockey	Punjab
Muhammad Khamis	Public service		Pakistan
Zahoor Ahmed Awan	Public service		Pakistan
Engineer Arif Naseem	Art	Sculpture	Khyber Pakhtunkhwa

== 2013 ==
On 13 August 2012, the following list of recipients was announced. Awards to be actually conferred on Pakistan Day (23 March 2013).

Name	Field	Specialization	Territory/Country
Tahira Syed	Arts	Singing	Pakistan
Shahida Latif	Literature	Literature/poetry	Punjab
Rafaqat Ali Mughal	Science	Mechanical engineering	Pakistan
Saadia Chaudhary	Science	Applied mathematics	Pakistan
Zahid Ahmad	Science	Mechanical engineering	Pakistan
Muhammad Aleem Mirza	Science	Electronic engineering	Pakistan
Abdul Manan	Science	Aerospace engineering	Pakistan
Wajih Anwar	Science	Mechanical engineering	Pakistan
Muhammad Imran Akram	Science	Avionics engineering	Pakistan
Asif Hameed	Science	Wireless communication engineering	Pakistan
Muhammad Iftikhar Ahmad	Science	Chemistry	Pakistan
Zia-Ullah	Science	Physics	Pakistan
Amer Sarfraz Ahmad	Science	Satellite technology engineering	Pakistan
Muhammad Iqbal Rao	Science	Space technology	Pakistan
Sikandar Majid Mirza	Science	Physics	Pakistan
Javaid Bashir	Science	Physics	Pakistan
Sardar Mehmood Ahmed Khan	Education	Medical	Pakistan
Pervaiz Iqbal Cheema	Education	Teaching and research	Punjab
Muhammad Rafiullah Khan	Education		Pakistan
Muhammad Ajmal Khan	Arts	Music (tabla playing)	Punjab
Alamgir	Arts	TV pop singer	Sindh
Shahida Mini	Arts	Singing	Pakistan
Naghma	Arts	Pashto singer	Khyber Pakhtunkhwa
Dur Muhammad Kassi	Literature	Literature/documentary	Pakistan
Maria Toorpakey Wazir	Sports	Squash	Pakistan
Naseeruddin Saami	Arts	Singing classical music	Pakistan

== 2014 ==
On 14 August 2013, the following list of recipients was announced. Awards to be actually conferred on Pakistan Day (23 March 2014)

Name	Field	Specialization	Territory/Country
Syed Tauqir Ashraf	Science	Physics	Sindh
Khalil-ur-Rehman	Science	Physics	Punjab
Wali Khan Babar	Education	Journalism	Sindh
Muhammad Arif Chaudhry	Science	Chemistry	Punjab
Farooq Ahmed Bhatti	Science	Analytical physics	Punjab
Ghulam Rasool Akhtar	Science	Computational physics	Punjab
Malik Murid Hussain	Science	Chemical engineering	Punjab
Munir Ahmad	Science	Civil engineering	Punjab
Tariq Hameed	Science	Nuclear engineering	Punjab
Tariq Ikram ul Haq	Science	Avionics engineering	Sindh
Jehanzaib Khan Lodhi	Science	Aerospace engineering	Punjab
Hamid Saleem	Science	Plasma physics	Punjab
Mohammad Mujahid	Science	Material engineering	Punjab
Mohammad Yousuf Khan	Science	Electronics and communication engineering	FATA
Brigadier Masood Raza	Science	Artificial intelligence (military application)	Punjab
Hyder Ali Palijo	Science	Project management	Sindh
Hasan Shahnawaz Zaidi	Education	Art and design	Punjab
Cecil Chaudhry	Education	Academic and human rights activism	Punjab
Mehreen Afzal	Science	Cryptography (military application)	Punjab
Shahid Abdullah	Arts	Art and design	Sindh
Ustad Shafiq-Uz-Zaman Khan	Arts	Calligraphy	Sindh
Tabbasum Kashmiri	Literature	Literature	Punjab
Agha Saleem	Literature	Literature	Sindh
Wali Muhammad Khan Siyal Kakar	Literature	Literature	Balochistan
Younus Javaid	Literature	Literature/scholar	Punjab
Ali Muhammadi Khorasani	Literature	Literature	Tajikistan
Syed Irshad Hussain Rashid (Late)	Education	Journalism	Pakistan
Khalid Ahmad	Education	Journalism	Punjab
Nazir Leghari	Education	Journalism	Punjab
Azhar Hussain Jafri	Education	Photo-journalism	Punjab
Munir Hussain (late)	Education	Journalism/cricket commentary	Sindh
Misbah-ul-Haq	Sports	Cricketer	Punjab
Zeeshan Abbasi	Sports	Cricketer	Punjab
Aurangzeb Leghari	Arts	Acting	Punjab
Ayub Khawar	Arts	TV Director	Punjab
Bakht Jamal	Science	Health professional	Pakistan
Muhammad Naeem	Science	Health professional	Pakistan
Ahad Khan Cheema		Civil services	Pakistan
Hanif Khan	Sports	Field hockey	Sindh

== 2015 ==
Name	Field
Sultan Muhammad Sukoon	Literature (Urdu poetry/First ever Hindko dictionary)
Syed Muhammad Qaisar Abbas Naqvi	Arts (drama acting)
Asif Ali Khan	Arts (film actor)
Ata-ur-Rehman	Journalism
Amir Khan	Sports (boxing)
Muhammad Baksh Alias Bakshan Mehranvi	Literature (Poetry)
Samina Baig	Sports (mountaineering)
Jamal Nasir	Social work
Mir Mohammad Ali	TV comedian (mimicry artist)
Saleem Kausar	Poet
Asim Bukhari	TV actor
Abdul Rauf Tahir	Journalist
Ayesha Haroon	Journalist
Muhammad Asif	Snooker player

== 2016 ==
1. Gulab Chandio
2. Wajahat Masood (Journalist)
3. Wasif Nagi (Journalist)
4. Ehsan Akbar (Literature)
5. Nisar Qadri (Film and TV actor)
6. Sabz Ali (Music - Tabla Playing)
7. Abdul Ghaffar (Public Service)
8. Najam Ahmed Shah (Public Service)
9. Captain (R) Zahid Saeed (Public Service)
10. Umar Draz Khan (Public Service)
11. Professor Abida Taherani (Education)
12. Ahmad Saeed (Industrialist)
13. Munir Ahmed Munir (Journalist)
14. Masood Akhtar
15. Khalid Butt
16. Waseem Abbas (TV and Film actor)
17. Ustad Nathoo Khan (Music - Sarangi Player), posthumously awarded
18. Agha Nasir
19. Saba Qamar (TV and Film actress)
20. Ejaz Qaiser (Ghazal singer)
21. Syed Talat Hussain (Journalist)

== 2017 ==
Awards to be conferred on Pakistan Day (23 March 2017)

Name	Field	Specialization	Country
Khalid Sharif	Science	Medicine	Pakistan
Muhammad Qasim Bughio	Arts	Literature	Pakistan
Shakir Shuja Abadi	Arts	Poetry (Saraiki language poetry)	Pakistan
Sarfraz Shahid	Arts	Literature	Pakistan
Khurshid Ahmad Nadeem	Arts	Journalism	Pakistan
Alamgir Anwar Shaikh	Sports	Snooker player	Pakistan
Rashid Ahmed Aslam	Arts	Public Service	Pakistan
Humaira Channa	Arts (Music, Film, Television)	Playback singer	Pakistan
Ghazi Salahuddin	Arts	Writer, Journalist	Pakistan

On 4 July 2017, Prime Minister Muhammad Nawaz Sharif awarded the Presidential Pride of Performance award to the team management, players and officials of the Pakistan cricket team, for their outstanding performance as the winners of ICC Champions Trophy 2017. Four former senior players were also awarded the Presidential Pride of Performance award:

Name	Field	Specialisation	Country
Azhar Ali	Sports	Cricketer	Pakistan
Fakhar Zaman	Sports	Cricketer	Pakistan
Muhammad Babar Azam	Sports	Cricketer	Pakistan
Shoaib Malik	Sports	Cricketer	Pakistan
Muhammad Hafeez	Sports	Cricketer	Pakistan
Sarfraz Ahmed	Sports	Cricketer	Pakistan
Shahdab Khan	Sports	Cricketer	Pakistan
Syed Imad Wasim Haider	Sports	Cricketer	Pakistan
Muhammad Amir	Sports	Cricketer	Pakistan
Muhammad Junaid Khan	Sports	Cricketer	Pakistan
Hassan Ali	Sports	Cricketer	Pakistan
Ahmed Shahzad	Sports	Cricketer	Pakistan
Haris Sohail	Sports	Cricketer	Pakistan
Rumman Raes	Sports	Cricketer	Pakistan
Wahab Riaz	Sports	Cricketer	Pakistan
Faheem Ashraf	Sports	Cricketer	Pakistan
John Michael Arthur	Sports	Cricket Coach	Australia
Grant Trafford Luden	Sports	Cricket Coach	South Africa
Stephen John Rixon	Sports	Cricket Coach	Australia
Grant William Flower	Sports	Cricket Coach	Zimbabwe
Shane Andrew Hayes	Sports	Cricket Physiotherapist	Australia
Azhar Mahmood	Sports	Cricket Coach	Pakistan
Talat Ali Malik	Sports	Cricket Official	Pakistan
Muhammad Talha Ejaz	Sports	Cricket Analyst	Pakistan
Shahid Aslam	Sports	Cricket Official	Pakistan
Donald Dave Albert	Sports	Cricket Official	Saint Lucia
Inzamam ul Haq	Sports	Cricket Official	Pakistan
Raza Rashid	Sports	Cricket Official	Pakistan
Aun Muhammad Zaidi	Sports	Cricket Official	Pakistan
Azhar Arif	Sports	Cricket Official	Pakistan
Amjad Hussain	Sports	Cricket Official	Pakistan
Usman Wahla	Sports	Cricket Official	Pakistan
Tauseef Ahmed	Sports	Cricket Official	Pakistan
Wajahtullah Wasti	Sports	Cricket Official	Pakistan
Wasim Haider	Sports	Cricket Official	Pakistan
Younis Khan	Sports	Cricketer	Pakistan
Shahid Afridi	Sports	Cricketer	Pakistan
Misbah ul Haq	Sports	Cricketer	Pakistan

== 2018 ==
Name	Field	Specialization	Territory/Country
Bashir Ahmad	Science	Physical Chemistry	KPK
Abdul Samad	Science	Archaeology	
Shahbaz Malik	Literature		Punjab
Mohammad Fahleem			
Aslam Pervaiz (late) [Kaiser Khan Nizamani	Arts	Acting (films)	Sindh
Zarrin Suleman Panna	Arts	Dancing (films)	Punjab
Salman Alvi	Arts	TV host and entertainer	
Harris Khalique			
Rauf Parekh	Arts	Linguist and Journalist	Sindh
Amin Hafeez	Arts	Journalism	Punjab
Muhammad Nawaz Raza			
Brigadier Javed Ahmed Satti (Retired)			
Taj Multani (singer)			Sindh
Bilqees Khanum			Sindh
Amanullah (TV comedian)			Punjab
A. Nayyar			Punjab
Master Ghulam Haider (1908 – 9 November 1953) (A pioneering film music director)			
Muhammad Ahmad Khan	Arts	Calligraphy	Punjab
Nighat Chaudhry (classical dancer)	Arts	Dancing	

== 2019 ==
Name	Field	Specialization	Territory/Country
Hamid Mahmood			Punjab
Mohammad Saeedur Rehman			Punjab
Mohammad Shahid Saleem			Punjab
Arshad Ali			Punjab
Dr Salma Khanam			Punjab
Vaqar Akhtar			Khyber Pakhtunkhwa
Raza Ellahi			KP
Waqar uz Zaman			KP
Mohammad Hasan			Sindh
Nasir Mahmood Khan			Punjab
Sarosh Hashmat Lodhi			Sindh
Umbreen Javaid			Punjab
Shabbir Jan			Sindh
Iftikhar Thakur			Punjab
Ishrat Fatima			Islamabad
Siyani Khatoon			Sindh
Bashir Ahmad			KPK
Reema Khan			Punjab
Nasir Adeeb	Arts	Film script writing	
Taj Baloch			Sindh
Sofia Yazdani			Sindh
Arshad Sharif			Punjab
Inam Butt			Punjab
Luqman Ali Afzal			
Sanaullah Ghuman			
Mohammad Ashraf Ali (late)			Gilgit-Baltistan
asheed Masood Khan			Balochistan
