= All Pakistan Music Conference =

Volunteer organization founded in 1959

All Pakistan Music Conference کانفرنس موسیقی تمام پاکستان
- Genre: Classical, Khayal, Thumri, Kafi, Maand, Dhrupad, Dadra, Hamd, Ghazal, Folk, Tabla
- Dates: 1st of every month 5 day Annual Festival end of October
- Locations: Lahore, Pakistan, Karachi, Pakistan
- Years active: 15 September 1959 – Now
- Founders: Hayat Ahmad Khan

The All Pakistan Music Conference (APMC) is a volunteer organization founded in 1959 for the promotion of classical arts in Pakistan and continues to preserve and promote Pakistani classical and folk music and dance. It hosts a concert of music every month (except for the summer months) and a 5 day annual festival in Lahore, Pakistan typically in the last weekend of October. It has a chapter in Karachi as well. Ever since its inception, it has been a constant source of inspiration for thousands of music lovers nationwide.

== History ==
At the time of the independence of Pakistan in 1947, Pakistan was so beset with insurmountable social, economic and political problems that fine arts virtually remained neglected. Up to that point in 1947, history's largest migration of people had totally upset the equilibrium of the population not only physically but also emotionally and psychologically. During such times, the arts could not get attention of the people or the government. Pakistani music was neglected more than all else. People only heard Radio Pakistan play some music now and then. The memory of live music concerts lingered in the minds of a few. If lovers of music had nostalgic memories, the musicians were totally frustrated and felt neglected. The height of despair was reflected in the decision of Ustad Bade Ghulam Ali Khan to leave his birthplace Pakistan to go to India. Soon after, Roshan Ara Begum announced that she was giving up Riyaz (music practice) as no one seemed interested in listening to her music. Her announcement jolted concerned citizens into action. Accepting the challenge, they decided to find ways and means to revive and rejuvenate the seemingly lost but rich and glorious heritage of classical music.

On 15 September 1959, these concerned citizens met at the famous Coffee House of Lahore and launched a voluntary organization under the title of The All Pakistan Music Conference. The main objective of the APMC was to promote music and musicians by organizing concerts, conferences and festivals. It was decided to hold, as soon as possible, a large event on national level to focus attention on our melodic culture. A festival of folk, light, semi-classical and classical music was announced for 19 February 1960 to 23 February 1960. Spread over five evening and two morning sessions, the festival was an instant success. Musicians from all over the country had participated. People from all walks of life, from all the big cities Quetta, Karachi and Peshawar, and from towns and villages all over Pakistan attended the concerts in large numbers. This music festival has recently been held at the Alhamra Arts Council in Lahore. The programme started daily at eight in the evening and lasted for five to six hours with the last evening closing a couple of hours after sunrise – a glorious day had dawned. The festival was the first major step which gave new lease of life to music in Pakistan. Followed by monthly concerts, it helped promote this noble art. Simultaneously, the festival helped project musicians. Great masters of whom the general public had not even heard and who were hidden even from the discerning eye were brought to the forefront.

== Objectives ==
The late Hayat Ahmad Khan (1921 – 6 February 2005) had been the moving spirit behind All Pakistan Music Conference. He was not only one of its founding members but also a long-serving secretary.

To encourage the classical musicians/vocalists living in obscurity after the independence of Pakistan in 1947, and particularly influenced by Roshan Ara Begum's probable intention to give up her 'Riyaz' due to the lack of interested listeners in Pakistan, Mr. Hayat along with several music connoisseurs laid the foundation of APMC. This project, he hoped, would rejuvenate interest in classical music in Pakistan. Many well-established artists like Roshan Ara Begum, Akhtari Bai, Rasoolan Bai, Ustad Bade Ghulam Ali Khan, Ustad Fateh Ali Khan, Ustad Salamat Ali Khan and Ustad Ghulam Hassan Shaggan have performed at APMC concerts.

Over the years, APMC has also brought forth several amateurs in the field of classical music. Notable names include Fahim Mazhar, Abdur Rauf, Sara Zaman and several others. APMC attracts music luminaries and aspiring artists alike to keep the classical music alive in the country. Not only that, both vocalists and instrumentalists from Afghanistan, Turkey, India, Japan, the United States and Germany, have benefited from the regular musical sittings held at APMC over the past 59 years as of 2017.

The APMC programmes, held on a monthly basis greatly enrich the cultural ethos of Lahore. Besides these monthly mehfils, APMC also hosts a yearly six-day festival in which musicians/vocalists from all over Pakistan perform till the wee hours of morning.

Few would know that APMC has also been instrumental in promoting classical dance in Pakistan. Classical dance performances of Naheed Siddiqui, Gopi Krishna and Sheema Kermani hosted by the organization stand as evidence.

== Famous performing musicians at All Pakistan Music Conference ==
- Roshan Ara Begum (Classical music singer of Kirana gharana)
- Mian Qadir Bukhsh Pakhawaji (founder of Punjab gharana of tabla players)
- Ustad Bade Ghulam Ali Khan
- Abdul Alim (Folk Music Singer)
- Sardar Khan
- Sharif Khan Poonchwaley (sitar player)
- Nazim Ali Khan
- Munir Sarhadi
- Zahida Parveen
- Sadiq Ali Mando
- Khamiso Khan (Alghoza player)
- Nathoo Khan (1920-1971) (sarangi player)
- Allah Ditta Pari Paikar
- Mian Shaukat Hussain (Tabla Player)
- Dagar brothers
- Rasoolan Bai
- Amanat Ali Khan (Patiala gharana)
- Bade Fateh Ali Khan (Patiala gharana)
- Nazakat Ali Khan, (Sham Chaurasia gharana)
- Salamat Ali Khan (Sham Chaurasia gharana)
- Khalifa Akhtar Hussain
- Ustad Naseeruddin Saami
- Ustad Ashraf Sharif Khan
- Shahbaz Hussain
- Ustad Mubarak Ali Khan
- Dildar Ali
- Amir Chouhan from Peshawar
- Barkat Ali Khan (Patiala gharana)
- Sain Akhter Hussain (Folk singer)
- Latafat Hussain Khan
- Niaz Hussain Shami
- Ghulam Hassan Shaggan (Classical vocalist of Gwalior gharana)
- Naseem Begum (film playback singer and television performer)
- Nabi Bakhsh (tabla player)
- Umeed Ali Khan
- Zahoori Khan
- Adbur Rashid Beenkaar
- Tufail Niazi (folk singer)
- Talib Hussain
- Lal Mohammad of Lal Mohammad Iqbal group (film music composers)
- Mohammad Aizaz Sohail (Karnatak and Khayal Singer)
- Sannan Mahboob (Rubab player)
- Akmal Qadri – (Bansuri or flute player)
- Haider Rahman (Bansuri or flute player))

== See also ==
- Music of Pakistan
- Qawaali
- Ghazal
