= Shamchaurasi =

- Town
- Location in Punjab, India Shamchaurasi (India)
- Coordinates: 31.4997°N 75.7494°E
- Country: India
- State: Punjab
- District: Hoshiarpur

Population (2001)
  - Total: 4,221

Languages
  - Official: Punjabi
- Time zone: UTC+5:30 (IST)

Shamchaurasi is a town and a municipal council in Hoshiarpur district in the Indian state of Punjab. It is also a constituency of the Punjab Legislative Assembly. In 2019, the Punjab Government announced that Shamchaurasi would be upgraded to a sub-tehsil. Shamchaurasi is home to Sham Chaurasia gharana of the Hindustani Classical music.

== Demographics ==
As of 2001 India census, Shamchaurasi had a population of 4221. Males constitute 52% of the population and females 48%. Shamchaurasi has an average literacy rate of 69%, higher than the national average of 59.5%: male literacy is 75%, and female literacy is 63%. In Shamchaurasi, 13% of the population is under 6 years of age.

== Notable people ==
- Amanat Ali Khan Famous Singer
- Fateh Ali Khan Famous singer and younger brother of Amanat Ali Khan
- Salamat Ali Khan
- Nazakat Ali Khan
- Sharafat Ali Khan
- Shafqat Ali Khan
