= Hussain Baksh Gullo =

Pakistani classical singer (1948-2023)

Ustad Hussain Bakhsh Gullo استاد حسین بخش گلو
- Born: c. 1948; Lahore, Pakistan
- Origin: Punjab, Pakistan
- Died: 5 December 2023 (aged 74–75) Lahore, Pakistan
- Genres: Classical, Khayal, Thumri, Kafi
- Occupations: Vocalist of classical and folk music
- Years active: 1960s – 2023

Hussain Baksh Gullo
- Awards: Pride of Performance award by the President of Pakistan in 2011

Ustad Hussain Baksh Gullo (c. 1948 – 5 December 2023) was a Pakistani classical vocalist and composer associated with Sham Chaurasia and Patiala Gharanas.

== Early life and background ==
Gullo was born in 1948 in Punjab, Pakistan and grew up in a family of musicians. His father, Ustad Nathu Khan, was a classical vocalist who trained him in music. Gullo was also a gandha-bandh student of Ustad Salamat Ali Khan.

== Career ==
Gullo started his broadcast career on Radio Pakistan and subsequently appeared regularly on Pakistan Television. He performed classical ragas such as Marwa, Todi, and Lalit throughout his career. Among his recorded works is the Punjabi kafi Dardaan de daru loko daso kithon milde and the classical raga-based song Balam kadar nahin jaane apni karat hai, mori na maane. He also performed in India, Middle East, Europe, and North America.

He was among the performers at an event in India where Lata Mangeshkar was in the audience. Impressed by his singing, she later invited him to a live concert at her residence. That residence concert lasted a marathon 9 hours.

== Awards and recognition ==
- Pride of Performance award by the President of Pakistan for his contributions to classical music in 2011.

== Teaching and legacy ==
During his 55 years long professional career, Gullo taught at the Alhamra Academy of Performing Arts under the Lahore Arts Council, where he mentored future classical singers.

== Artistry ==
His musical style and dreamy, soft voice sang a mix of khayal, thumri, ghazal, and kafi songs.

== Personal life ==
Gullo is the father of classical vocalists Ghulam Shabir Gullo Khan, Suraj Khan, and Chand Khan. He is also an uncle of Ustad Shafqat Ali Khan and a cousin and the brother-in-law of Ustad Salamat Ali Khan.

Gullo's father, Ustad Nathu Khan (1920 - 1971) was a noted musician and a sarangi player of Pakistan who also was a disciple of famous classical musicians Jarnail-Karnail Patiala duo of Patiala gharana. Hussain Baksh Gullu's style of singing was a bouquet of influences of both Patiala gharana and Sham Chaurasia gharana.
