= Rafaqat Ali Khan =

Pakistani singer-songwriter and musician

Ustad Rafaqat Ali Khan
- Origin: Lahore, Pakistan
- Genres: Hindustani classical music
- Occupations: Singer-songwriter, musician
- Instruments: Vocals, tabla, dholak, harmonium, electric drum and synthesizer
- Years active: 1990–present
- Labels: Times Music, Moviebox Birmingham Limited, OSA
- Website: www.rafaqatalikhan.com

Ustad Rafaqat Ali Khan is a Pakistani singer-songwriter and musician. Trained as a classical singer, he is the son of the classical music singer Nazakat Ali Khan and nephew of Salamat Ali Khan of Sham Chaurasia gharana. He is the cousin of classical music singer Shafqat Ali Khan. With a career spanning over two decades, Rafaqat Ali Khan has established himself as a successful artist, and released eleven albums.

He also was marked as a playback singer for Krrish, Dhokha and Youngistaan earning widespread acclaim for his singing. In 2016, Khan marked his Coke Studio (Pakistan) debut as a featured artist and sang Tu Kuja Man Kuja in Coke Studio Pakistan (season 9), as a part of the team of Sheraz Uppal.

== Early life and career ==
Rafaqat Ali Khan was born into a musical lineage, the Sham Chaurasia gharana of classical music, to Nazakat Ali Khan. His uncle Salamat Ali Khan was also a singer who sang with his father Nazakat Ali Khan for over half a century. His cousins Shafqat Ali Khan, Shujat Ali Khan and Latafat Ali Khan are all classical singers. Rafaqat graduated from University of Punjab in MA Political Science. Khan started his musical beginnings at very young age and was trained by his father and then uncle. He appeared in television and did shows at Radio together with his uncle and cousins. He then started singing solo and did shows in countries like India, UK, United States, UAE, Canada, Australia, the Middle East, and many European countries. Rafaqat Ali Khan also performed at the All Pakistan Music Conference event in Lahore in 2016. Rafaqat Ali works was featured on the Rishi Rich's album The Project and he has recorded a song with Peter Gabriel.

Rafaqat Ali Khan is also known as a successful playback singer in films Krrish, Dhokha, Silence Please... The Dressing Room, Youngistaan and received Mirchi Music Awards for Song Representing Sufi Tradition at Mirchi Music Awards. His debut was as a featured artist by singing Tu Kuja Man Kuja with Coke Studio Pakistan (season 9), under Sheraz Uppal.

== Filmography ==
=== Films (Playback) ===
Year	Movie	Song Title	Co-Singer
2004	Silence Please... The Dressing Room	Raat Katne Ko Hai	Solo
2006	Krrish	"Mystic Love Mix"	with Alka Yagnik
2007	Awarapan	Maula Maula	Solo
2007	Dhokha	Dhoka (Title Track)	Solo
2014	Youngistaan	Daata Di Diwani	with Shiraz Uppal

=== TV Series Performer ===
Year	Movie	Song Title	Co-Singer
2016	Coke Studio Pakistan	Tu Kuja Man Kuja	with Shiraz Uppal

=== Discography ===
- Nishaan
- Maa
- Chand Se Chehre
- Rahat & Rafaqat
- Yaadan Teriyan
- Charkha Gal Karda
- Allah Tera Shukriya
