= Azhar Suhail =

- Abdus Sattar
- Born: 2 June 1949; Narang Mandi نارنگ منڈی, Sheikhupura, Punjab, Pakistan
- Died: 12 October 1997 (aged 48); London, England
- Education: Masters in Urdu
- Alma mater: Islamia College
- Occupation: Journalist
- Years active: 1969–1996
- Spouse: Khalida Parveen
- Children: 3 Sons, 2 Daughters
- Parent: Maulvi Ghulam Ahmed
- Awards: Pride of Performance Awards (1990–1999)

Azhar Suhail (born 2 June 1949) was a Pakistani journalist, editor, media personality, and a bureaucrat born in Narang Mandi نارنگ منڈی, Sheikhupura. He wrote 5 books. In 1994, he received Pride of Performance (Urdu: تمغۂ حسنِ کارکردگی) which is a civil award given by the Government of Pakistan to Pakistani citizens in recognition of distinguished merit in the fields of literature, arts, sports, medicine, or science for civilians.

== Early life ==
Azhar Suhail was born in Narang Mandi نارنگ منڈی to Maulvi Ghulaam Ahmed and Iqbal begum in a town located in the Muridke Tehsil of Sheikhupura District, Punjab, Pakistan on 2 June 1949 two years after the partition of India.

=== Family ===
His younger brother Athar Masood worked for The Daily Jang (روزنامہ جنگ) newspaper based in Pakistan. His younger brother Abdul ghafoor abid works at associated press of Pakistan as senior journalist, reporter at daily Jang +Geo and he is famous as well as illustrious person in his town. On the other hand, his brother Abdul Rauf was elected as chairman of Narang Mandi and is also a notable personality in the area. Abdul Rauf had worked for APP and many news papers and he is a notable personality in social and political circle of the area. His youngest brother Abdul Shakoor khokhar joined Punjab Police as an ASI in 1991 and was serving as Reserve Inspector in Police Training College, Chung, Lahore until his death.

=== Education and journalistic career ===
He received his early education in his native village with religious atmosphere at home. His father (Ghulam Ahmed) taught him Persian. For further studies he went to Lahore to Islamia College (Urdu: اسلامیہ کالج) is a group of three colleges in Lahore, Punjab, Pakistan affiliated with the University of Punjab and Punjab University Oriental College (commonly known as Oriental College, is an old institution of Oriental studies in Lahore). While still a student at Islamia College, Lahore, he worked two jobs, one for weekly Chattan as sub editor with then famous Agha Shorish Kashmiri (scholar, writer, debater, and leader of the Majlis-e-Ahrar-e-Islam party). He also wrote columns for then famous newspaper Kohistan. In between jobs, he worked in different departments of the government, but never left the pen alone.

He moved to Islamabad in 1977. He worked there for Daily Jang, Nawa-i-Waqt, and Daily Pakistan as magazine editor, chief reporter, journalist, and editor. Time to time. He received best reporter award from All Pakistan Newspapers Society. While he was working in between these newspapers.

He wrote 5 books Agencion ki Hakumat, Sazishon ka daur, Pir pagara ki kahani Kuch unki Kuch meri zabaani, Sindhri Sey Ojheri Camp Tak, General Zia ke giyarah sal.

In 1994 he started working as DG (Director General) a BPS-22 grade officer, the highest civil servant for Associated Press of Pakistan (APP) a government-operated national news agency of Pakistan. While serving for APP, he hosted a news show Muqabil Hai Aaina daily on PTV.

=== Death ===
He died at 48 in London on 13 October 1997. And was buried by the side of his parents in Narang Mandi.
