= Mashkoor Hussain Yaad =

Pakistani Urdu scholar and poet

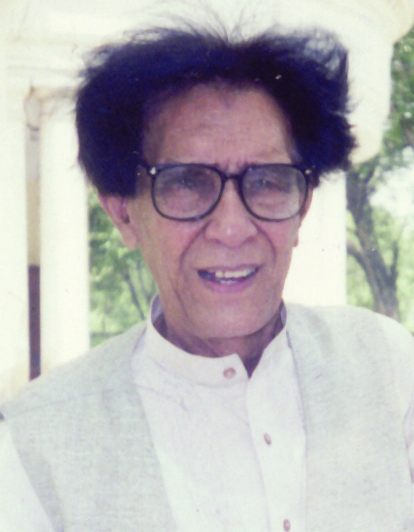
- Born: 1925; Hisar, British India
- Died: 2017 (aged 91–92)
- Citizenship: British India; Pakistan
- Awards: Pride of Performance; Sitara-i-Imtiaz

Mashkoor Hussain Yaad (Urdu: مشکور حسین یاد) (1925-2017) was an Urdu language Pakistani poet, novelist and scholar who authored several books. His works include Azadi Ke Charagh, a memoir of his experiences of Partition in Eastern Punjab. Yaad won the Pride of Performance in 1999 and the Sitara-i-Imtiaz in 2011 for his contributions to literature.

== Biography ==
Mashkoor Hussain Yaad was born in 1925, in Dabwali, Hisar of East Punjab (now part of Haryana). He went by the pen name "Yaad", and later added this to his name when he became a poet. At a young age, his family moved to Muzaffarnagar District in Uttar Pradesh, where his father became a police officer.

He was married first in 1943. Two weeks after Partition in 1947, his house was attacked and 35 of his family members were killed, including his wife and his three-year-old daughter. Only Yaad and his father survived the attack, and both migrated to Multan, Pakistan.

Yaad died in 2017 at the age of 92 On the occasion of his death, Shehbaz Sharif, the Chief Minister of Punjab at the time, publicly expressed his condolences and said that Yaad's contribution to Urdu literature will be remembered for a long time.

== Literary career ==
Just before he graduated from school, Yaad became editor of the newspaper Pukar. In his capacity as editor, Yaad was able to closely observe India's independence movement and the Pakistan movement. He also met and interviewed leaders of these movements, including Muhammad Ali Jinnah and Jawaharlal Nehru.

In Pakistan, he served as editor of the literary magazine “Hamayuon” in Lahore, Pakistan from 1948 to 1950. He worked as lecturer and professor of Urdu literature at Government College, Lahore starting from 1963 up to his retirement in 1985. Meanwhile, he also served as Editor-in-Chief of Monthly Literary magazine Zaafran during 1970s.

His literary career was re-launched after he became Professor of Urdu at Government College, Lahore and published Azadi Ke Charagh.

Afterwards, he served as Editor in Chief of Monthly Chashmak published from Lahore, Pakistan in 1989 as well as Chief Editor of a magazine by Misbah ul Quran Trust from 1989 to 1995. In 1999, the Pakistan Government appointed him at Chair Pakistan at Tehran University Tehran, Iran.

During his career, he was also appointed as a distinguished member of the following important governmental committees:

1. Governing Body of the Board for Advancement of Literature Lahore from 1984 to 1996.

2. Governing Body of National College of Arts, Lahore from 1986 to 1987;

3. Script Committee of Alhamra Arts Council, Lahore from 1985 to 1990.

4. Urdu Development Board, Karachi from 1977 to 1982

In addition to all these academic positions, Mashkoor also remained busy in authoring his books and in writing for different literary magazines, newspapers and radio Pakistan. His most famous book “Azadi Ke Charagh” was first published in 1971. This book is an autobiographical account of the events that happened to him and his family during their migration from India to Pakistan from August to November 1947 as his family including his one and half year old daughter was brutally martyred in August 1947 at the time of Independence of Pakistan.

In addition to this, Mashkoor also authored four books with Urdu Essays, six books having humorous articles. He also authored ten books on different topics of literary criticism. He has some sixteen books on poetry among which two books have the poetry in praise of the religious personalities of Islam while two books consists of Satirical and Humorous Poems.

Mashkoor wrote six books on different topics of Islam and Islamic philosophy including one book on the philosophy of Mulla Sadra. He was also a specialist of Ghalib and Iqbal. He also contributed in improving the Urdu translation of Quran’s exegesis Tafseer-e-Namoona consisting of 27 volumes published from 1984 to 1989.

Though not a member of Pakistan's Progressive Writers Association, he was friends with many of its members, especially Ahmed Nadeem Qasmi. Qasmi and Yaad even lived in the same neighborhood in Lahore, Samanabad's Zafar Colony, along with the poet and lyricist Qateel Shifai, also a close friend.

Along with Qasmi and others, Yaad is featured in a recently published compilation of interviews with Pakistan's major literary figures.

== Bibliography ==
Books by Yaad include:

- Bardasht
- Ghalib Botiqa
- Ghalib Ki Taba-e-nukta Joo
- Goongi Nazmein
- Meer Anees ki Shairana Baseerat
- Meer-e-Balonsh
- Mutala-e-Dabeer
- Azadi ke Charagh

== Awards and recognition ==
- Pride of Performance Award by the President of Pakistan in 1999
- Sitara-i-Imtiaz (Star of Excellence) Award by the President of Pakistan in 2011
