= Ghulam Hassan Shaggan =

Pakistani singer (1928–2015)

Ustad Ghulam Hassan Shaggan
- Born: 1928; Amritsar, India
- Died: 3 February 2015 (aged 86–87); Lahore, Pakistan
- Occupation: Pakistani classical music singer
- Years active: 1947–2015
- Awards: Sitara-e-Imtiaz (Star of Distinction) by the President of Pakistan in 2000; Pride of Performance Award by the Government of Pakistan in 1988

Ustad Ghulam Hassan Shaggan (1928, in Amritsar – 3 February 2015) was a Pakistani classical music singer of the Gwalior Gharana from the Hindustani classical music genre. Ustad Ghulam Hassan Shaggan was the recipient of numerous awards including the Pride of Performance (1988) and Sitara-e-Imtiaz (2000) (Star of Excellence) awards from the Government of Pakistan.

== Personal life and early years ==
Ghulam Hassan Shaggan was born in Amritsar, British India in 1928 or 1932. His father's name was Bhai Lal Mohammad (died 1962), who belonged to the Gwalior-Kapurthala Gharana. Ghulam Hassan Shaggan, along with his father and family, moved to Pakistan in 1947 and settled in Lahore.

Ghulam Hassan Shaggan lived in Iqbal Town, Lahore with his sons Qadir Shaggan (vocalist and music director) and Mazhar Shaggan (rabab and mandolin player).

His grandson, Muslim Shaggan, is also a noted singer in the Gwalior Gharana tradition.

== Career ==
Ghulam Hassan Shaggan's father Bhai Lal Mohammad was appointed music supervisor at Radio Pakistan, which allowed Shaggan opportunities to perform at the radio station. Over a period of 12 years, as Shaggan gained recognition, he started performing more frequently at Radio Pakistan, at the All Pakistan Music Conference, and other events in Pakistan and abroad.

=== International tours ===
In the 1990s, Ghulam Hassan Shaggan had received recognition in Europe as an outstanding representative of the North Indian classical music tradition. His talent was first recognized by French musicologists Gerard Kurgijian and Martina Catella. They invited him to perform in France, Sweden, Spain, Switzerland, Germany and the UK.

Ghulam Hassan Shaggan also collaborated with the alternative/trance band Fun-Da-Mental. This band used an arrangement of his original bandish in Raag Bhopali in the band's 2001 album, There Shall be Love!

=== Final years ===
Even in his final years before his death in 2015, he continued to perform in public with youthful enthusiasm and the characteristic vigor and abundant stamina of the Gwalior gayaki.

== Awards and recognition ==
- Sangeet Samrat Award at the music conference in Calcutta in 1962
- Pride of Performance Award by the President of Pakistan in 1988
- Sitara-e-Imtiaz (Star of Excellence) award in 2000 from the Government of Pakistan

He received countless awards and titles during his 1962 tour of India. He was conferred the titles of Sangeet Rattan, Sangeet Alankar, Sangeet Samrat, Sindh Sangeet Mandalam and King of Music from the Sindh Sangeet Mandal in Mumbai. During the same 1962 tour of India, he was presented with a certificate of recognition by sarod maestro Hafiz Ali Khan of India.

In 2014, Ustad Ghulam Hassan Shaggan was honoured with the first Lifetime Achievement Award of the Lahore music forum.

== Death and legacy ==
Ghulam Hassan Shaggan died on Tuesday, 3 February 2015 in Lahore, Pakistan at age 86. His son, Qadir Shaggan, reportedly said that his father had been suffering from heart disease. When his condition suddenly deteriorated, he was taken to Punjab Institute of Cardiology, Lahore where he was pronounced dead. Among his survivors are two sons, Qadir Shaggan who is also a classical music vocalist and a music director. The other son, Mazhar Shaggan, is a rabab and mandolin player.
