= Khalida Inayat Noor =

Pakistani mathematician

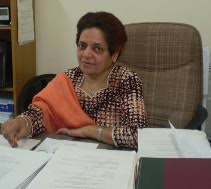
- Born: 19 Aug 1946 (age 79); Rawalpindi, Pakistan
- Education: Doctor of Philosophy
- Alma mater: University of Wales, University of the Punjab
- Occupations: Educator, Mathematician
- Awards: Pride of Performance (The President's Award) (2010)

Khalida Inayat Noor is a Pakistani mathematician who is known for work on topics such as mathematical analysis, variational inequalities, and integral operators. She was awarded the Pride of Performance by the President of Pakistan in 2011.

== Biography ==
Khalida Noor got her master's and bachelor's degree from University of the Punjab in Lahore in 1967 and 1965 respectively. She received her Master of Philosophy in mathematics from Islamabad University in 1968 and a Ph.D. from Wales University in 1972. From 1980 to 1981, she was a student advisor and member of the Board of Studies at Islamia University, Bahawalpur and from 1982 to 1988 was an Equivalence Committee member in Riyadh, Saudi Arabia.

In 2010, she was a member of the editorial board of many international journals of mathematics and engineering sciences, and had as many as 800 research papers published in scientific journals. She is also a member of the Higher Education Commission of Pakistan and a Chartered Mathematician in the United Kingdom. Besides those qualifications, she also is a fellow of the Institute of Mathematics and its Applications. Noor is a professor of mathematics in the United Arab Emirates University. In October 1996, one of her papers appeared in the Journal of Mathematics.

== Recognition ==
She is a fellow and member of the following Scientific Societies:

- Member, American Mathematical Society, United States
- Life Member, Punjab Mathematical Society, Pakistan
- Fellow, Institute of Mathematics and its Applications, U.K.
