= Shahida Latif =

Pakistani poet, journalist, thinker, and researcher

Shahida Latif is a Pakistani poet, journalist, thinker, and researcher. She is a 2013 Pride of Performance Awards winner for her works. She has three books of poetry in print including her book on Pakistani history, Role of Army in Pakistan.
