= Amin Hafeez =

Pakistani journalist and news reporter

- امین حفیظ
- Occupations: content creator, journalist, reporter, writer
- Years active: 1986–present
- Organization: Geo News (2002–2022)
- Known for: reporting style
- Awards: Pride of Performance by the President of Pakistan in 2018

Amin Hafeez is a Pakistani freelance journalist, news reporter and YouTuber, known for his humorous style of reporting. Based in Lahore, Hafeez received the Pride of Performance award for journalism from the president of Pakistan in 2018.

== Career ==
Hafeez started his career in journalism in 1986. His electronic media career began in 2002 with GEO TV. Throughout his career, he has been known for his unique and funny news reports. In 2018, his news report of discussing age-old relations between humans and donkeys, while riding a donkey, went viral. His interview with a buffalo also went viral in 2021.

He left Jang Media Group in February 2022, to focus on his YouTube career. His YouTube channel had 154K subscribers in mid-2022, and 256K subscribers in July 2026.

== Award(s) ==
- Pride of Performance Award 2018 by the President of Pakistan

== See also ==
- Chand Nawab
