= Roshan Ara Begum =

Pakistani classical music singer (1917 - 1982)

Malika-e-Mauseeqi Roshan Ara Begum SI PP
- رَوشن آرا بیگم
- Born: Waheed-un-Nisa; 1917; Calcutta, Bengal Presidency, British India
- Died: 6 December 1982 (aged 64–65); Lahore, Pakistan
- Occupations: Classical singer; Vocalist
- Years active: 1926 - 1982
- Style: Thumri • Khayal • Ghazal
- Television: PTV Pakistani television
- Title: Malika-e-Mauseeqi (Queen of Music); The Queen of Classical Music
- Spouse: Chaudhry Ahmed Khan (husband)
- Children: 2
- Parent(s): Abdul Haq Khan (father); Chanda Begum (mother)
- Relatives: Abdul Karim Khan (co-founder of Kirana gharana of classical music)
- Awards: Pride of Performance Award by the President of Pakistan (1960); Sitara-e-Imtiaz (Star of Excellence) Award by the Government of Pakistan (1962)

Roshan Ara Begum (Urdu: رَوشن آرا بیگم) (1917 – 6 December 1982) was a vocalist belonging to the Kirana gharana (singing style) of Hindustani classical music. She is also known by her honorific title Malika-e-Mauseeqi (The Queen of Music) and The Queen of Classical Music in both Pakistan and India.

== Early life and training ==
Born in the city of Calcutta (now Kolkata) in British India, she was the daughter of Ustad Abdul Haq Khan and tawaif Chanda Begum, and a cousin of Ustad Abdul Karim Khan, also of the Kirana gharana. Her mother, an accomplished singer, recognized her daughter's musical talent early on. She began studying vocal music extensively with Mumtaz Hussein and Laddan Khan. Her two cousins Abdul Wahid Khan and Abdul Karim Khan were also her teachers.

Possessing a rich and mature voice that could lend itself to a wide range of classical music pieces, her singing features a full-throated voice, short and delicate passages of sur, lyricism, romantic appeal, and swift taans. These were combined in her unique style, which reached its peak from 1945 to 1982. Her vigorous style of singing was interspersed with bold strokes and layakari. She had control over a wide range of ragas. Melody was considered the most important feature of her singing.

Born in Calcutta in 1917, Roshan Ara Begum visited Lahore during her teens to participate in musical soirées held at the residences of affluent citizens of Chun Peer in Mohalla Peer Gillaanian at Mochi Gate, Lahore, British India (now in Pakistan). During her occasional visits to the city, she also broadcast songs from the then All India Radio station in Lahore, and her professional name was announced as Bombaywali Roshan Ara Begum. She had acquired this popular nomenclature because she shifted to Mumbai, then known as Bombay, in the late 1930s, to live near her cousin Abdul Karim Khan, from whom she took lessons in Hindustani classical music for 15 years.

Roshan Ara Begum was also invited to the Royal Courts by the Nawabs and Princes; at their courts, she would sing songs.

In the 1930s, Roshan Ara was selected due to her singing, as at that time, heroines were also required to be trained in singing. She worked in four films in Hindi, Urdu, and Punjabi as the leading lady.

A senior police officer in Bombay and a music lover, Chaudhry Ahmed Khan, approached her with an offer of marriage in 1944. Roshan Ara Begum consulted her tutor, Ustad Abdul Karim Khan, about it. She finally accepted the marriage offer on the condition that she would not have to give up her music after marriage. Her husband kept his promise, and she continued to sing throughout her life. In Mumbai, she lived in a sprawling bungalow with her husband, Chaudhry Ahmed Khan.

== Career ==
Melody was considered the most important feature of her singing.

Migrating to Pakistan in 1948 after the partition of India, Roshan Ara Begum and her husband settled in Lalamusa, a small town in Punjab, Pakistan, from which her husband hailed. Although far away from Lahore, the cultural centre of Pakistan, she would travel back and forth to participate in music, radio, and television programmes.

A widely respected classical music patron of Pakistan, Hayat Ahmad Khan approached her and convinced her to become one of the founding members of All Pakistan Music Conference in 1959. To promote classical music, this organization continues to hold annual music festivals in different cities of the Pakistan even today.

She was called "Malika-e-Mauseeqi" (Queen of Music) in Pakistan. She would wake up early in the morning and start her 'riyaz' (musical practice) after her morning religious prayers. She decided to adopt a boy and a girl since she herself remained childless.

Roshan Ara Begum also sang some film songs, mostly under music composers like Anil Biswas, Feroz Nizami, and Tassaduq Hussain, for films such as Pehali Nazar (1945), Jugnu (1947), Kismet (1956), Roopmati Baaz Bahadur (1960), and Neela Parbat (1969).

Classical musicians Bade Fateh Ali Khan, Amanat Ali Khan of Patiala gharana, and Ustad Salamat Ali Khan of Sham Chaurasia gharana used to listen to her recordings for their own enjoyment.

== Personal life ==
Roshan Ara Begum was the cousin of Abdul Karim Khan. Later she married Chaudhry Ahmed Khan and settled with him in Lalamusa, Punjab, Pakistan where she adopted two children.

== Illness and death ==
She died due to cardiac arrest in Pakistan at Lahore on 6 December 1982 at the age of 65.

== Awards and recognition ==
Roshan Ara Begum received the Sitara-e-Imtiaz Award, or (Star of Excellence) Award, in 1962 and the Pride of Performance Award in 1960 from the President of Pakistan. She was the first female vocalist to be awarded the Sitara-e-Imtiaz.

Year	Award	Category	Result	Title	Ref.
1960	Pride of Performance	Award by the President of Pakistan	Won	Herself	
1962	Sitara-e-Imtiaz	Award by the President of Pakistan	Won	Herself	
1970	EMI Silver Disc Awards	Best Ghazal Singer	Won	Herself	

== Bibliography ==
- Kirana, by Roshan Ara Begum. Published by Gramophone Co. of India,
