= Tu Kuja Man Kuja =

Qawwali performed by Nusrat Fateh Ali Khan

Song by Nusrat Fateh Ali Khan

from the album Tu Kuja Man Kuja
- Language: Urdu
- Released: 1982
- Genre: Qawwali
- Length: 16:30
- Label: Oriental Star Agencies Ltd.
- Composer: Nusrat Fateh Ali Khan
- Lyricist: Muzaffar Warsi

"Tu Kuja Man Kuja" (Persian: تو کُجا من کُجا transl. Where are You? Where am I?) is a qawwali performed by Nusrat Fateh Ali Khan. It was composed by Nusrat Fateh Ali Khan himself and written by Muzaffar Warsi.

== 2016 version ==
"Tu Kuja Man Kuja"

Single by Rafaqat Ali Khan and Shiraz Uppal

from the album Coke Studio S9E7(finale)
- Released: 23 September 2016
- Genre: Pop
- Length: 8:51
- Label: Coke Studio (Pakistan)
- Composers: Nusrat Fateh Ali Khan (original); Shiraz Uppal (director)
- Lyricist: Muzaffar Warsi
- Producers: Coca-Cola and Strings
External media
Audio
- "Tu Kuja Man Kuja" on SoundCloud
Video
- "Tu Kuja Man Kuja" on YouTube

In 2016, the song was covered by Rafaqat Ali Khan and Shiraz Uppal, with the music video directed by Uppal. It was produced by Strings during Pakistani musical TV show Coke Studio's season 9, episode 7 finale.

== Song credits ==
- Artists: Shiraz Uppal & Rafaqat Ali Khan
- Music Director: Shiraz Uppal
- Produced & Directed By: Strings
- Houseband: Imran Akhoond (Guitars), Babar Khanna (Dholak/Tabla), Haider Ali (Keyboards/Piano), Abdul Aziz Kazi (Percussions)
- Guest Musician: Amir Azhar (Banjo), Rahil Mirza (Guitars), Umair Hassan (Keyboards), Fazal Abbas (Tabla), Bradley Dsouza (Bass), Nadeem Iqbal (Harmonium)
- Humnawa: Zahid Sabri, Danish Sabri, Mohammad Shah, Junaid Warsi

== Popularity ==
The music video of the song featured Rafaqat Ali Khan and Shiraz Uppal. It was released on 23 September 2016. It was the 3rd Pakistani origin Coke Studio video to reach 100 million views after Tajdar-e-Haram(1st video), Afreen Afreen(2nd video) and Tera Woh Pyar(4th video). The music video has received over 250 million views on YouTube.
