= Nathoo Khan =

Pakistani sarangi player (1920–1971)

Ustad Nathu Khan
- Born: 1920; Amritsar, Punjab, British India
- Died: 1971 (aged 50–51); Munich, Germany
- Occupations: Instrumentalist, composer (sarangi player)
- Known for: All India Radio; Radio Pakistan; Pakistan Television Corporation
- Awards: Pride of Performance Award by the Government of Pakistan in 2016

Nathu Khan (1920–1971; sometimes spelled as Nathoo), was a Pakistani sarangi player known for introducing solo sarangi playing tradition with difficult phrases. He was associated with Radio Pakistan and Pakistan Television Corporation. Previously, he had also worked at All India Radio before emigrating from India.

He has the distinction of having playback singer Ahmed Rushdi as his informal disciple in classical music from 1944 to 1948.

== Biography ==
Nathoo Khan was born in Amritsar, British India. His father Baba Balle was a tabla player. Nathoo Khan considered Ustad Ahmadi Khan, Ustad Allah Diya and Bhai Lal Muhammad as his mentors while he was training in music. Following the partition of India, he migrated to Pakistan where he became a staff artist at Radio Pakistan, Karachi, Pakistan.

His uncle Feroze Din was one of his sarangi teachers. He first appearance in a sarangi playing performance was at Kaliyar Sharif where he played Raag Shudh Sarang, a Hindustani classical music raag.

He was introduced to Radio Pakistan, Karachi by its then Managing Director Zulfiqar Ali Bukhari. He later worked at the 'Pakistan International Airlines Arts Academy'.

During his career at Radio Pakistan, he composed music for a few films and radio plays.

According to a major newspaper of Pakistan:

"He was also a great accompanist and accompanied almost all the great vocalists of his time like Ustad Ashiq Ali Khan, Bade Ghulam Ali Khan, Salamat Ali Nazakat Ali, Roshan Ara Begum. According to Ustad Salamat Ali Khan, he was the best accompanist he ever sang with; Ram Narayan being the second best".

== Awards ==
Nathoo Khan was posthumously awarded the Pride of Performance award in 2016 by the government of Pakistan in recognition of his contribution to classical music and Sindhi music.

== Death ==
Nathoo Khan died in 1971 after a short illness while on a tour of Europe.
