= Anita Ghulam Ali =

Educator and newscaster (1934 - 2014)

Anita Ghulam Ali (1934 – 8 August 2014) was an educational expert in Sindh, Pakistan. She was a recipient of Pride of Performance (1999) and Sitara-e-Imtiaz awards.

== Early life and education ==
Anita was born on 2 October 1934, in Karachi, British India to Feroze Nana Ghulamally and Shereen Nana (nee Mirza). Her father was a judge in the Sindh High Court. Her mother, Shireen Nana, was the daughter of Mirza Nadir Baig and her great-grandfather was Mirza Qaleech Baig. Anita received her early education in Maharashtra, India. After returning to Karachi, she graduated from the University of Sindh in 1980. In 1983, she also received a B.Sc. from D. J. Sindh Government Science College in Karachi.

== Career ==
Anita Ghulam Ali started her broadcast career with Radio Pakistan, Karachi in the late 1950s as an English language news broadcaster and served in that position for almost 2 decades. Professor Anita Ghulam Ali was a popular English news broadcaster in the 1960s.

She started her career as a teacher in Microbiology at Sindh Muslim Government Science College, Karachi in 1961. She taught at that college until 1985. She was appointed Minister of Education, Culture, Science, Technology, Youth, and Sports. She was an assistant professor at Sindh Muslim Government Science College in 1987. During that time, she was the leader of the Pakistan Teachers Association and worked at Radio Pakistan as a newscaster for 20 years.

Prof. Anita Ghulam Ali (S.I) was the Founding Managing Director of Sindh Education Foundation (SEF) since 1992 till 2013. She was responsible for making it an institution of national stature. She was affectionately known as Anita Apa.

With over 500 publications and articles published in newspapers on multiple dimensions of education, she was a walking definition of the phrase "The pen is mightier than the sword" . She wrote many articles relating to the education of women. She wrote books in English about Sindhi embroidery and the Secrets of the Palace.

She was appointed as an education minister in 1996 under the provincial caretaker government.

Anita represented Pakistan at various international forums of education and development.

== Death ==
She died of a respiratory illness at Karachi's South City Hospital on 8 August 2014 after being treated there for 3 months.

== Awards and recognition ==
- Pride of Performance Award by the Government of Pakistan in 1999.
- Sitara-i-Imtiaz (Star of Excellence) Award by the President of Pakistan in 2004.
- 'Benazir Women Excellence Award' at the 5th International Conference on Women's Leadership held in Karachi.
