= Mohammad Aizaz Sohail =

Pakistani singer from Karachi (born 1987)

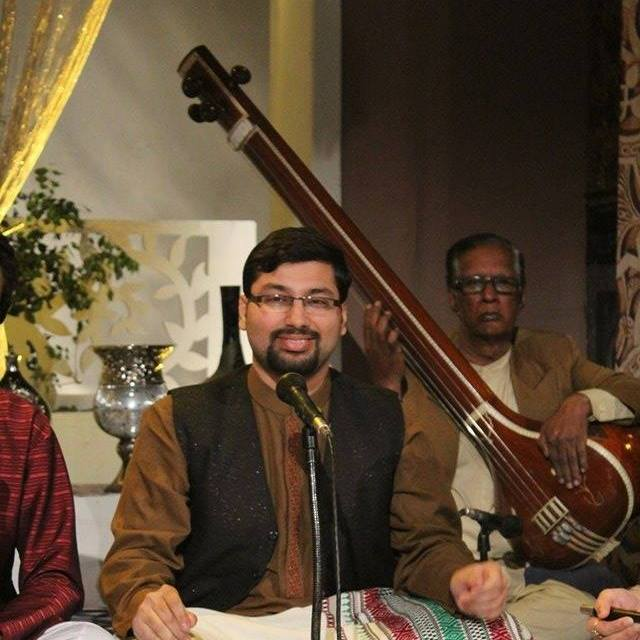
- Photo of Mohammad Aizaz Sohail at Firdous-E-Gosh

Background information
- Born: Mohammad Aizaz
- Genres: Classical, Ghazal, Playback, Blues, Fusion, Sufi, Thumri
- Occupations: Singer, Musician
- Instrument: Tanpura Swarmandal
- Years active: 2000–present
- Label: Independent

Mohammad Aizaz Sohail (Urdu: محمد اعزاز سہیل) is a Pakistani singer from Karachi. Born on May 22, 1987, Aizaz is a trained singer in eastern classical music. He is well known for his appearances in Pakistan Superstar and Pakistan Television Corporation's program 'Firdous-e-Gosh'. He has also been a teacher to many renowned names in the Pakistani music industry.

== Early life ==
Mohammad Aizaz Sohail was born on May 22, 1987, in Karachi, Pakistan. Mohammad Aizaz Sohail started singing at a very tender age of 6 years. He understood the intricacies of music at a small age under the guidance of his mother. When Tsunami struck Indonesia and almost every Pakistani was engrossed in collecting funds, Aizaz performed with the renowned Ghazal singer Tina Sani and received much praise and admiration. He won the ISEO (International Schools Education Olympiad) in the vocal category. Aizaz started taking formal Classical training from Master Abdul Rauf. Just after 6 months of training he was able to obtain a gold medal in the All Pakistan Music Conference in the classical category. He also secured 2nd Position in the reality show Pakistan Superstar. Aizaz is the student of Ustad Faheem Mazhar. He is also taking help for vocal training from Anol Chatterjee who is the senior disciple of Pandit Ajoy Chakrabarty. He has worked in Pakistan Television Corporation and many other TV channels making successful appearances.

== Career ==
Mohammad Aizaz Sohail is active in the field of music and has performed in the prestigious All Pakistan Music Conference, Pakistan Superstar, Superstars of Tomorrow by Radio1 FM91 and the Octave Project. Aizaz made his first TV appearance in PTV World's program Weekend World since 2014 and has appeared in the program numerous times. Aizaz and his group of musicians performed as guest band for Absolute Manto by Olomopolo Media. Aizaz became known for his regular appearances in PTV Home's program Firdous-e-Gosh based on eastern classical music.

=== All Pakistan Music Conference ===
Aizaz got the opportunity to perform thrice in the most prestigious event of Pakistani Eastern Classical music, All Pakistan Music Conference from the year 2013 and on wards. All Pakistan Music conference (APMC) was founded in 1959 for the promotion of classical music in Pakistan and is being held every year. Aizaz made his debut APMC in October 2013 in which he performed and won a gold medal in the amateur classical category. Aizaz was promoted to the professional Classical Category in 2014's edition of APMC and performed in the same category in the 2015's APMC edition as well. Aizaz returned at All Pakistan Music Conference in March 2019 and performed Raag Madhuvanti.

==== All Pakistan Music Conference Lahore ====
Year	Category	Genre	Language	Note(s)
2013	Amateur	South Asian Classical	Hindi	Awarded Gold Medal for best Classical Vocals
2014	Professional	Karnatak Vocal	Hindi	Introduction of Karnatik Classical Vocals to APMC for the first time.
2015	Professional	Karnatak Vocal and South Asian Classical Fusion	Hindi	First ever fusion of North and South traditions of singing in Pakistan.
2016	Professional	South Asian Classical	Hindi	Khayal in Raag Behag.
2017	Professional	South Asian Classical	Hindi	Khayal in Raag Charukeshi.
2018	Professional	South Asian Classical	Hindi	Khayal in Raag Kedara.
2019	Professional	South Asian Classical	Hindi	Raga Todi

==== All Pakistan Music Conference Karachi ====
Year	Category	Genre	Language	Note(s)
2019	Professional	South Asian Classical	Hindi	Raag Madhuvanti

=== Pakistan Superstar ===
In the year 2014, Aizaz was selected to perform in the digital music reality show by the name of Pakistan Superstar and secured the 2nd position the show. The notable performance of Aizaz from this show are of Tu He Re and Kahay Cher Cher.

=== Octave Project ===
Aizaz performed in the Octave Project in 2014, a platform for performing arts for budding artists and musicians. He is well known for his cover of Breathless by Shankar Mahadevan and Zamanay Kay Andaaz by Junoon.

=== Firdous-e-Gosh ===
Aizaz joined the team of young singers in PTV Home's program Firdous-e-Gosh in 2014 where he performed the opening act the Lakshan Geet for the program along with a bunch of other classical singers as well. Firdous-e-Gosh is an eastern classical-based show in which one Raag was thoroughly explained in an episode by theory and performances. Aizaz made his first appearance in the program in the Ahir Bhairav episode and continued till the last aired episode of the program. His notable performances in the program were Tan Mann Dhan Tope Varun from the episode of Raag Kalavati and Fusion from the Raag Charokeshi episode.

=== Khoye Hu'un Ki Justaju ===
Mohammad Aizaz Sohail recently joined and became a permanent part of Pakistan Television Corporation’s newly launched program Khoye Hu'un Ki Justaju as a singer. The concept of the program is based on remembering the bygone traditions, people and cultural values. Pakistan Television Corporation chairman Atta ul Haq Qasmi is himself a permanent part of the show. Aizaz has been assigned to remember and share the memories of Pakistan’s music of the golden era.

=== Lahore Music Meet ===
Year	Appeared As	Note(s)
2016	Moderator	Moderated a workshop with Ustad Badar uz Zaman and Rakae Jamil on Classical Music.
2017	Vocalist	He has performed in Lahore Music Meet 2017 as a playback vocalist and received great appreciation.
2018	Vocalist	He also performed at Lahore Music Meet 2018 for the crowd of Lahore.
2020	Vocalist	Mohammad Aizaz performed with Mughal-e-Funk and Fake Shamaans along with Natasha Humera Ijaz and Haniya Aslam on both days respectively.

=== Lifetime Learning At LUMS ===
Mohammad Aizaz worked as an assistant professor at the Lifetime Learning At LUMS Programme along with the noted Kathak dancer Nighat Chaodhry and Imran Mushter Nafees. He taught music in collaboration with Dance and Theater. A course which gives an exhaustive insight to performing arts along with the opportunity to perform on-stage. He is currently teaching his own course of vocal culturing

== Bands ==
=== Mughal-E-Funk ===
Mohammad Aizaz has performed at a number of places with the South-Asian Funk Fusion Band called Mughal-E-Funk. Performing at True Brew Studios, Levi's Live and the Governor House Sindh at British Council's 70th Birthday to name a few.

=== Mekaal Hassan Band ===
Mohammad Aizaz Sohail has also performed with the Lux Style Awards winning Mekaal Hassan Band as a featured vocalist in their recent tour and shows.

=== Amezish ===
Mohammad Aizaz recently formed a band by the name of Amezish with Waleed Attique, who is a bassist to Mekaal Hassan Band, Shiraz Uppal and Asrar, and Lala Ahsan, who is a drummer to Badnaam (band) who were the runners-up in Pepsi Battle Of Bands.

== Corporate Ventures ==
=== Coke Studio 2020 ===
Mohammad Aizaz appeared as a featured artist in Coke Studio 2020, also known as Coke Studio Season 13. He made his debut and performed Megh (raga) in the final episode of the season. While explaining the song, Aizaz told Coke Studio that, "This song is a five note (sur) raag; sa-re-ma-pa ni-sa and sa-ni-pa-ma-re-sa. It belongs to the kaafi thaat (family of raags) and the Megh raag is associated with rainfall. It is because of this raag that dark clouds form in the sky, making it rain. Those are the feels with which this raag has been made; the raag encapsulates you in the vision of serene rainfall atop a mountain."

=== Bisconni Music ===
Mohammad Aizaz Sohail made an appearance in the first season of Bisconni Music and performed his composition of Meda Ishq with Mughal-e-Funk and Mahnoor Altaf. The lyrics of the song were taken from Bulleh Shah and Khwaja Ghulam Farid.
