= Muzaffar Warsi =

Pakistani songwriter and poet (1933 - 2011)

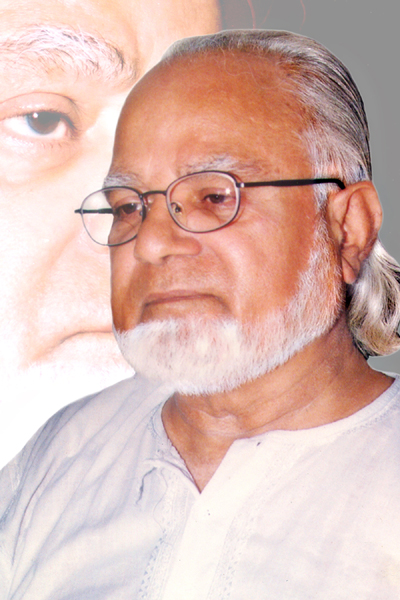
- Muzaffar Warsi
- Born: Muzaffar Siddiqui; 23 Dec 1933; Meerut, United Provinces, British India
- Died: 28 January 2011 (aged 77); Lahore, Punjab, Pakistan
- Occupations: Poet (Hamd and Na'at lyricist, film songs lyricist)
- Years active: 1961–2006
- Awards: Pride of Performance Award by the President of Pakistan in 1988

Muzaffar Warsi (23 December 1933 – 28 January 2011; Urdu: مظفر وارثی) was a Pakistani poet, essayist, lyricist, and a scholar of Urdu. In a writing career spanning around five decades, he left behind a rich collection of na`ats, as well as several anthologies of ghazals and nazms, and his autobiography Gaye Dinon Ka Suraagh. He also wrote quatrains for Pakistan's daily newspaper Nawa-i-Waqt. His lineage was carried forward by his son, Haseeb Urfi Warsi, until the latter's death in June 2025. The family lineage continues through his two sons, Nameer Urfi and Mashhood Urfi who represent the 40th generation in ancestry of Hazrat Abu Bakar Siddiq R.A.

== Early life and career ==
Muzaffar Warsi was born as Muhammad Muzaffar ud Din Siddiqui into the family of Alhaaj Muhammad Sharf ud Din Ahmad, known as Sufi Warsi (Urdu: صوفی وارثی). His was a family of landlords of Meerut (now in Uttar Pradesh, India). Sufi Warsi was a scholar of Islam, a doctor and poet. He received two titles: 'Faseeh ul Hind' and 'Sharaf u Shu'ara'. Sufi Warsi was a friend of Sir Muhammad Iqbal (Allama Iqbal (علامہ اقبال), Akbar Warsi, Azeem Warsi, Hasrat Mohani, Josh Malihabadi, Ahsan Danish, Abul Kalam Azad and Mahindar Singh Bedi. His family raised him with deep religious grounding. He had one brother and two sisters. Muzaffar Warsi was survived by three daughters and one son. His grandson Amsal Qureshi is a singer, guitarist, composer, songwriter, music producer and poet.

Muzaffar Warsi had worked at State Bank of Pakistan (the central bank of Pakistan) as deputy treasurer. He started writing his poetry by writing lyrics for songs for Pakistani movies but gradually changed direction and his style of poetry became more oriented towards praising Allah and Muhammad. He later started writing Hamd and Na`ats. He also wrote, regularly, a stanza or two on current affairs in the newspaper Nawa-i-Waqt until shortly before his death. His most popular Na`at remains "Mera Payambar azeem tar hai" (My Prophet is the highest.)

== Death ==
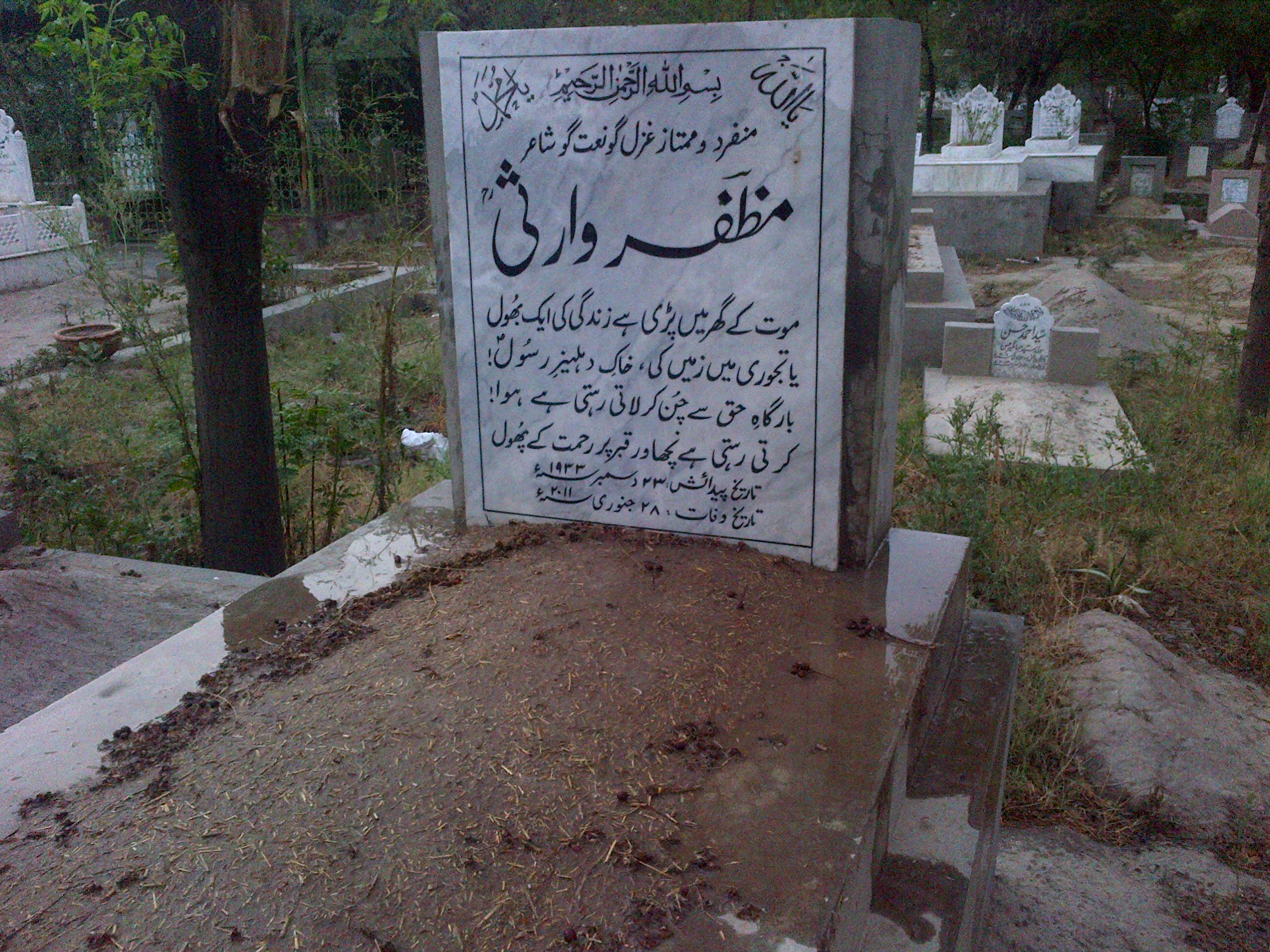
Warsi's last resting place at Johar Town Graveyard Lahore

Warsi died on 28 January 2011 in Lahore, Pakistan. He was buried at Johar Town Graveyard Lahore.

== Literary work ==
- RA. Alhamd. (Hamdiya Kalaam)
- Lashareek. (Hamdiya Kalaam)
- Wohi Khuda Hai. (Hamdiya Kalaam)
- Kaaba-e-ishq. (Naatia Kalaam)
- Noor-e-azal. (Naatia Kalaam)
- Baab-e-Haram. (Naatia Kalaam)
- Meray Achay Rasool. (Naatia Kalaam)
- Dil Sey Dar-e-Nabí Tak. (Naatia Kalaam)
- Sahib-ut-Taaj. (Naatia Kalaam)
- Ummi Laqabi. (Naatia Kalaam)
- Gaye Dinon Ka Suraagh. (Khud-nawisht)- an autobiography
- Barf Kí Nao. (Ghazliyaat)
- Khulay Dareechay Band Hawa. (Ghazliyaat)
- Lehja. (Ghazliyaat)
- Raakh Kay Dhair Main Phool. (Ghazliyaat)
- Tanha tanha guzri hai. (Ghazliyaat)
- Dekha jo teer kha kay. (Ghazliyaat)
- Hisaar. (Ghazliyaat)
- Zulm na sehna.
- Lahu ki haryali.
- Sitaroon ki aabju.
- Mera to sab kuch mera nabi hai ( naatia kalaam).
- Ya Allah, Ya Rahman. (Hamdiya Kalaam)

== Awards ==
- Pride of Performance Award in 1988 by the President of Pakistan.

== Famous poems ==
- "Wohi Khuda hai", written and Sung by Muzaffar Warsi, later Sung by Ustad Nusrat Fateh Ali Khan. In modern days, it was even Sung by Atif Aslam*
- "Ya Allah, Ya Rahman", written by Muzaffar Warsi was sung by Ustad Nusrat Fateh Ali Khan and a few such recordings of his are available on YouTube. A version of this is part of the album Chain of Light, which is a collection of four recordings that were rediscovered 34 years after they were originally recorded on analogue at Real World Studios in England and stored there. They were digitally restored and released world-wide in September 2024. This recording of "Ya Allah, Ya Rahman" has been viewed over 916,000 times as of 17 November 2024 on YouTube.
- ”Ya Rahmatallil Aalameen”, a naat written and sung by Muzaffar Warsi
- "Kya bhala mujh ko parakhney ka natija nikla, Zakhm-e-dil aapki nazron se bhi gehra nikla"
- Ghazal sung by Lata Mangeshkar & Jagjit Singh
- Chitra Singh frequently used the Ghazals of Muzaffar Warsi

Pakistani film Hamrahi (1966) was a milestone film in renowned Pakistani playback singer Masood Rana's singing career. All songs of 'Hamrahi' are relegated as the 'Best of Masood Rana'.

Film Hamrahi's seven songs are listed here below:

- "Kiya kahoon aye duniya walo, kiya hoon mein" (film: Hamrahi: 1966, lyrics: Muzaffar Warsi, music: Tasadduq Hussain)
- "Karam ki ik nazar hum per...ya Rasool Allah"
- "Ho gaye zindigi mujhay pyari".
- "Naqsha teri judaye ka ab tak nazar mein hai".
- "Mujhay chore kar akela, kaheen dooor janay walay".
- "Qadam, qadam pay naye dukh".
- "yaad karta hai zamana unhi insano ko", sung by Masood Rana was a tribute song to Muhammad Ali Jinnah
- One of his super-hit poems was his Hamd "Koi to hay jo nizam e hasti chala raha hay", this Hamd first became popular recited in his own voice, which was later sung by Nusrat Fateh Ali Khan
- "Pukara hai madad ko, bay kason nay, haath khali hai...bachaa lo doobnay say ....ya Rasool Allah" was another popular Na'at written by him
- "Aey Khuda, Aey Khuda, jis nay ki justuju, mil gaya uss ko tuu" Sung by Adnan Sami Khan, written by Muzaffar Warsi, film Sargam
- "Tu Kuja Man Kuja" was also written by him, originally composed and sung by Nusrat Fateh Ali Khan. The modern adaptation of the song was also performed in Coke Studio Pakistan (season 9) by Rafaqat Ali Khan and Shiraz Uppal.

== Books on Muzaffar Warsi ==
- Gaye dinon ka suraagh- Aapbeeti k tawana lehjey (Urdu), Qudratullah Shehzad, 2005.
