= Ijaz Qaiser =

Pakistani singer (1954–2020)

Ijaz Qaiser (singer)
- Born: 1 January 1954; Faisalabad, Pakistan
- Died: 26 May 2020 (aged 66); Faisalabad, Pakistan
- Occupations: Radio Pakistan Singer; Pakistani television performer
- Years active: 1970s – 2017
- Known for: Semi-classical music singing Ghazal singing
- Awards: Pride of Performance award by the President of Pakistan in 2016; Superstar award by Radio Pakistan at its diamond jubilee event in 2022

Ejaz Qaiser or Ijaz Qaiser (1 January 1954 – 26 May 2020) was a Pakistani singer. He was known for singing Ghazals.

== Awards and recognition ==
- On 23 March 2016, the President of Pakistan bestowed upon him the Pride of Performance award.
- Superstar award by Radio Pakistan at its diamond jubilee event in 2022.

== Career ==
Qaiser was born on 1 January 1954 in Faisalabad, Punjab, Pakistan. He was trained in semi-classical music and ghazal singing by Ustad Akhtar Hussain Akhian. He first sang many of his ghazals that he is noted for, on Radio Pakistan in the 1970s and the 1980s.

Later, he used to make regular appearances on many Pakistani television channels in addition to holding public concerts.

== Popular ghazals ==
- Muddetein Ho Gaeen Hain Chup Rehte, Sung by Ejaz Qaiser, poet: Mahshar Lakhnavi
- Tamannaon Mein Uljhaya Gaya Hoon, Sung by Ejaz Qaiser, poet: Shad Azimabadi
- Aankh Barsi Hay Teray Naam Peh Sawan Ki Tarah, Sung by Ejaz Qaiser, poet: Murtaza Birlas
- Ab Kay Hum Bicchray Tau Shaaed Kabhi Khawabon Mein Milein, Sung by Ijaz Qaiser, poet: Ahmad Faraz
- Ranjish Hee Sahi Dil Hee Dukhaanay Ke Liye Aa, Sung by Ijaz Qaiser, poet: Ahmad Faraz
- Ku Baku Phael Gaee Baat Meri Shanasai Ki, Sung by Ejaz Qaiser, poet: Parveen Shakir
- Pyar Bharay Duo Sharmeelay Nain, Sung by Ijaz Qaiser, poet: Khawaja Pervez (originally a film song from 1974 Pakistani film Chahat, music composed by Robin Ghosh)

He sang many ghazals already sung by Mehdi Hassan and Ghulam Ali. Ijaz's approach to ghazal singing reminded many people of Mehdi Hassan's style of singing.

== Death ==
Ejaz Qaiser had been suffering from heart, kidney and lungs diseases. He had stopped singing a couple of years ago due to his illness. On 25 May 2020, he was hospitalized with cardiac arrest in Faisalabad, Pakistan. He is survived by his son Mumtaz Qaiser He died on 26 May 2020, at the age of 66. His funeral was held in Faisalabad, Pakistan.

Among the people attending his funeral ceremony, besides his family and relatives, were many other professional singers including singers Hasan Sadiq, Ali Sher and Amanat Ali who said that Ijaz Qaiser was his music teacher.
