= Bhai Lal Mohammad =

Bhai Lal Mohammad or Bhai Lal Mohammad Amritsari (died 1962) was an Indian and Pakistani classical music singer of the Kapurthala Gharana trained in the Gwalior style of singing.

== Early life and training ==
Bhai Lal Mohammad was born in Amritsar, British India. His background was from a rababi family of musicians and received his initial training from his father Bhai Ata Muhammad, a disciple of Mian Bannay Khan of the Gwalior gharana. After his father's death, Bhai Lal Mohammad started learning from Mian Mahboob Ali, a renowned sitar player of the Kapurthala gharana.

Bhai Lal Mohammad also was a disciple of Pandit Bhaskarbuwa Bakhale. Bhaskarbuwa himself had learned from Ustad Faiz Mohammad Khan (Gwalior gharana), Ustad Bande Ali Khan (Kirana gharana), Ustad Natthan Khan (Agra gharana), and Ustad Alladiya Khan of Kohlapur (Jaipur-Atrauli gharana).

== Career ==
Bhai Lal Mohammad was given the title of Sangeet Sagar (Ocean of Music) in 1927 at the Shikarpur Music Conference. In 1936, Bhai Lal's elder son, Nisar Hassan came down with tuberculosis and died at the young age of 26. Bhai Lal then decided to train his younger son, Ghulam Hassan Shaggan, to continue his musical legacy and the family tradition.

After the independence of Pakistan in 1947, Bhai Lal Mohammad's family moved to Lahore, against the wishes and requests of friends and disciples to stay back in Amritsar, India. In Pakistan, Bhai Lal was appointed music supervisor at Radio Pakistan, Lahore and his son Ghulam Hassan Shaggan started performing at the same radio station. Since Pakistan was a newly independent country and had meager economic resources, the next 12 years proved to be extremely difficult for Bhai Lal and his family. During this time, Pakistani people were struggling economically and recognition of classical arts was not a high priority.

== Death and legacy ==
Bhai Lal Mohammad died in 1962 at Lahore, Pakistan. His musical legacy was continued by his son Ghulam Hassan Shaggan (1928 – 3 February 2015) and now, after the son's death in 2015, by his grandsons, Qadir Hassan Shaggan and Mazhar Hassan Shaggan.
