= Hayat Ahmad Khan =

Pakistani connoisseur and sponsor of classical music (1921–2005)

- Born: 15 September 1921; Lahore, British India
- Died: 6 February 2005 (aged 83–84); Lahore, Pakistan
- Occupations: Connoisseur and sponsor of classical music in Pakistan
- Known for: Founder and secretary-general of All Pakistan Music Conference in 1959; Member of the Board of Governors of Alhamra Arts Council, Lahore and the Lok Virsa, Islamabad
- Awards: Sitara-e-Imtiaz (Star of Excellence) Award by the Government of Pakistan in 2000

Hayat Ahmad Khan (15 September 1921 – 6 February 2005) was a connoisseur and a sponsor of classical music in Pakistan.

He founded the All Pakistan Music Conference (APMC) in 1959 and was its secretary-general for a long time.

== Early life and education ==
Hayat Ahmad Khan was born in Lahore, British India on 15 September 1921. He received his basic education and graduated from Islamia College, Lahore. He then graduated from the University of Punjab, Lahore in 1942. He later studied classical music at the Gandharva Mahavidyalaya, New Delhi Academy of classical music, completing his master's degree in music there.

=== Establishment of Pakistan Music Conference ===
After the independence of Pakistan in 1947, there was definitely a need for a formal organization on a national level to encourage the classical musicians/vocalists living in obscurity and feeling neglected. In 1959, Pakistan's eminent classical singer Roshan Ara Begum was reportedly threatening to give up her Riyaz (music practice) of classical music due to lack of interested listeners in Pakistan.

So Hayat Ahmad Khan, along with several other music connoisseurs, laid the foundation of All Pakistan Music Conference in 1959. APMC started holding a six-day music festival starting in 1960 where classical, semi-classical, folk and light music events (including ghazal evenings) were held to promote the cause of music in Pakistan. Hayat Ahmad Khan and his music-loving friends also persuaded Roshan Ara Begum to continue singing classical music.

By 1992, All Pakistan Music Conference had grown into a society with over 2,000 members and its annual festival was eagerly awaited by the music enthusiasts of Pakistan.

Pakistan's Dawn newspaper commented in 2014, "The event has a huge contribution towards introducing new talent to music fanciers of the country and revitalizing classical and semi-classical music through seasoned musicians and singers." This music festival has been held in Pakistan for more than last five decades now. "Ever since its inception, it has been a constant source of inspiration for thousands of music lovers nationwide."

== Awards and recognition ==
- Sitara-e-Imtiaz (Star of Excellence) Award by the Government of Pakistan in 2000 for his contribution towards classical music
- Member of the National Commission on History and Culture of Pakistan since 1994
- President of the Japan Karate Association of Pakistan since 1970
- President of the Pakistan Japan Cultural Association in 1981
- Member of the Board of Governors of Lahore Arts Council

== Death ==
Hayat Ahmad Khan was hospitalized on 1 February 2005 and later died on 6 February 2005 at age 83 at Lahore, Pakistan.
