= Riaz Batalvi =

Pakistani journalist and writer (1937–2003)

- Born: Riaz Batalvi; Feb 1937; Batala, Punjab Province, British India
- Died: 15 January 2003 at age 65; Lahore, Pakistan
- Occupations: Journalist, writer
- Notable credit: Ex Editor of Daily Mashriq
- Awards: Pride of Performance Award by the Government of Pakistan in 1986

Riaz Batalvi (1937 – 15 January 2003) was a senior Pakistani journalist, writer and dramatist.

== Early life and career ==
Riazul Hasan was born in February 1937 in Batala, Gurdaspur District in Punjab Province, British India. His family migrated to Pakistan after the partition of India in 1947. First, he started working for Daily Kohistan newspaper which was edited by the veteran journalist and novelist Naseem Hijazi. Then he switched over to Daily Mashriq newspaper, when it was launched in 1963 and later became its editor.

== As a playwright ==
Riaz Batalvi wrote a short story called Dubai Chalo which was well received by the public and was later turned into a highly popular movie by the same name - Dubai Chalo (1979). He also wrote a popular TV drama Aik Haqeeqat Aik Fasana for the Pakistani television.

== Awards and recognition ==
- Pride of Performance Award by the Government of Pakistan in 1986

== Death ==
Riaz Batalvi died on 15 January 2003 at age 65 in Lahore, Pakistan.
