= Narang, Pakistan =

City in Punjab, Pakistan

Narang نارنگ (Narang Mandi)
- City
- Interactive map of Narang
- Location within Punjab, Pakistan Location within Pakistan
- Coordinates: 31°54′15″N 74°30′41″E
- Country: Pakistan
- District: Sheikhupura District

Population (2023 census)
  - City: 67,137
- Website: www.narangmandi.com

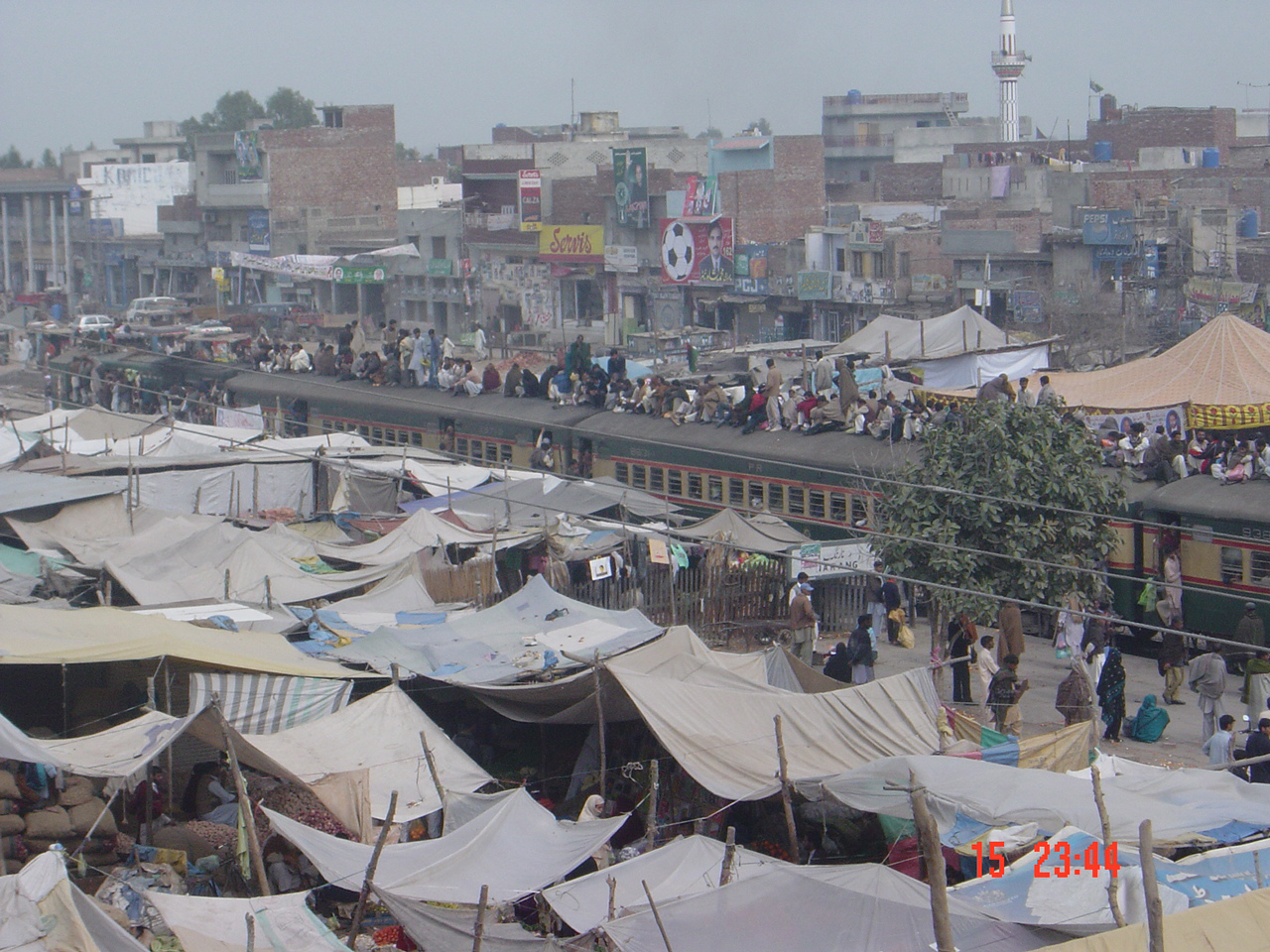
Narang Mandi view

Narang (Urdu: نارنگ), also known as (Narang Mandi) , is a city located approximately 76 km from Lahore in the Muridke Tehsil of Sheikhupura District, in Punjab, Pakistan. The city is situated around 8 kilometres from the India–Pakistan border.

== Demographics ==
Population

Historical population
Year	Pop.	±%
1972	10,122	—
1981	17,081	+68.8%
1998	31,345	+83.5%
2017	45,770	+46.0%
2023	67,137	+46.7%

According to official 2023 census results, the population of Narang city is 67,137.
