= Zafar Colony =

Area of Lahore, Pakistan

Coordinates: 30°05′N 71°11′E

Zaffer Calony is an area in Lahore District, Pakistan.

== Violence ==
In March 2015 a former police constable was shot dead in the colony.
