= Ghani Parwaz =

Pakistani writer

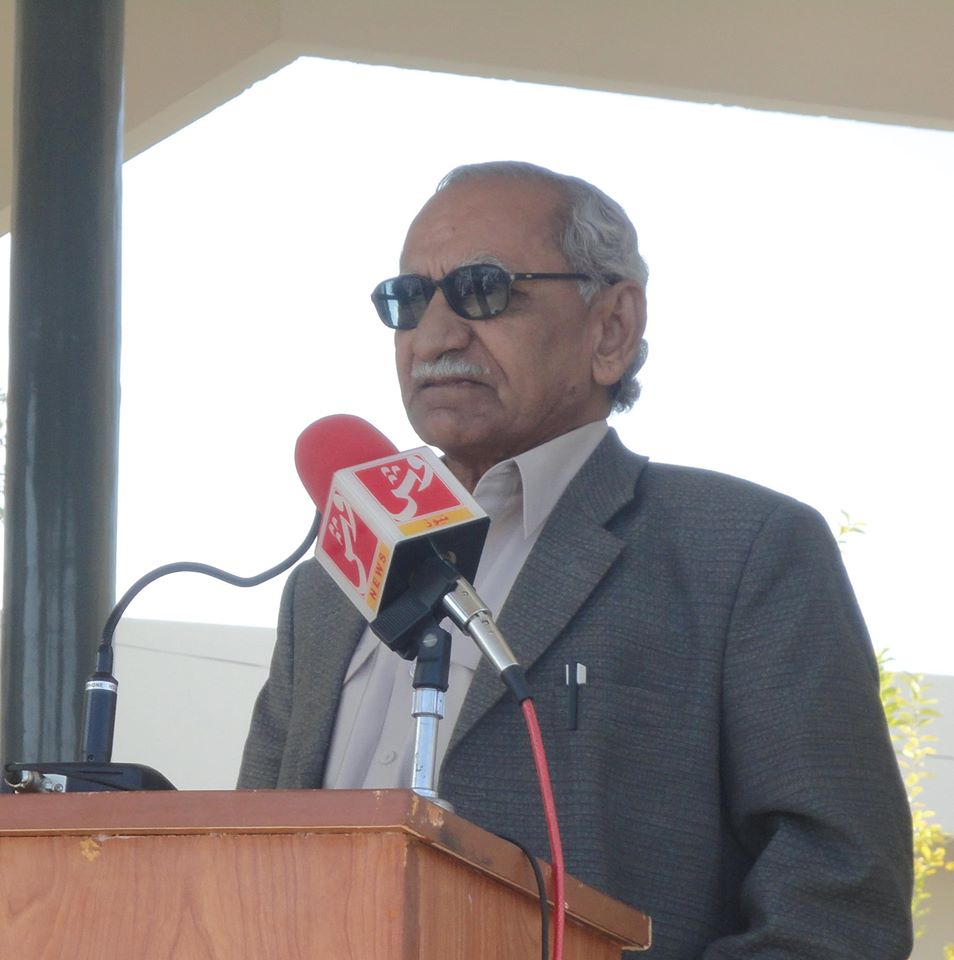
- Ghani Parwaz, delivering a lecture
- Born: 15 August 1945 (age 81); Nizarabad, Tehsil Tump
- Occupation: Writer

Ghani Parwaz (born 15 August 1945) is a Pakistani writer from Turbat, Balochistan.

== Early life and education ==
Parwaz was born in the village of Nizarabad, Tehsil Tump, in Kech District . His father, Haji Muhammad Ibrahim, was a trader, contractor, and land owner. Ghani Parwaz had no interest in the occupations of his father; instead he was interested in literature. This led him to do double M.A, Balochi Fazul, and BEd, and then take teaching as his occupation. He was school teacher and headmaster for ten years, and served for 24 years as a college lecturer, professor, and principal.

== Literary career ==
His literary works include poetry, short stories, novels, plays, research, criticism, travelogue, translation, and others. He has written approximately 100 books, and 40 books have been published.

Parwaz is the founding president of two literary organizations; "Labzanki Karwan", Turbat (Literary Caravan), and Balochistan Academy, Turbat, as well as being the only Secretary (Head) of Literary Alliance "Labzanki Chagerd", Turbat (Literary Society, Turbat).

== Other activities ==
Parwaz is also a human rights activist and the Coordinator of the Human Rights Commission of Pakistan's regional office in Turbat, in the Balochistan province.

== Awards ==
Parwaz has received regional, provincial and national awards including, the Presidential Pride of Performance, which he received on Pakistan Day (23 March) 2011.

== Major works ==
Novels:

- Mehr ay Hosham (A Craving for Love) (2000)
- Shapjaten Raahi (Night-bitten Traveler) (2007)
- Mehr o Humrahi (Love and Companionship) (2011)
- Aas Alwat kanaan enth (The Fire is Whispering) (2016)
- Maah-e-sar o Rooch-e-cher (Under the Sun and Over the Moon) (2017)
- Mareekh-e-Musapir (Traveler of Mars) (2015)

Short story collections:

- Saankal (Handcuffs) (1992)
- Be Manzilen Musaper (Traveller without a Destination) (1995)
- Mehr Pa Baha Gept nabit (Love cannot be bought) (1997)
- Murtagen Mard ay Pachen cham (Open eyes of a dead man) (2001)
- Thoda Sa Paani (Just a Little Water) (2002)
- Jangal (Forest) (2004)
- Banden Cham kay pach bant (When closed eyes open) (2008)
- Dil ke Saharay (The Supports of Heart) (2009)
- Sarshap ay Marg (Death of Early Night) (2010)
- Dil Mehr Musaper Menzel (Heart, Love, Traveler, Destination) (2012)
- Distagen Waab o Nadesthagen Maana (Seen Dreams and Unseen Meanings) (2021)
- Aap cher thalaan enth (2024)

Non-fiction books:

- Maoism kya hai? (What is Maoism?) (1986)
- Insaan aur Ikhlakiaat (Man and Ethics) (1987)
- Labzanki Shargedaari (Literary Criticism) (1997)
- Fiction O Ai Ay Tekneek (Fiction and its Techniques) (2009)
- Noken Raah (The New Path) (2013)
- Waabani Dawaar (The Dream Land) (2016)
- Afkaar-e-Alam (Universal Thoughts) (2017)
- Har Daur Ka Falsafa (Philosophy of Every Age) (2018)
- Yatani Darya Chol Jant (The Waves of Memory) (2021)
- Sanj O Ganj (2025)

Poetry:

- Mosam Inth Wadaarani (The Waiting Season) (1998)
- Kassi Nahan Maten watan (I'm No One's Motherland) (2001)

Compilations:

- Kaarwaan 1 (Caravan 1) (1986)
- Kaarwaan 2 (Caravan 2) (1987)
- Kaarwaan 3 (Caravan 3) (1988)
- Kaarwaan 4 (Caravan 4) (1989)
- Kaarwaan 5 (Caravan 5) (1990)
- Aadenk 1 (Mirror 1) (1995)
