= Lahore Music Forum =

Non-profit organization in Pakistan

- Established: February 24, 2011; 15 years ago
- Type: Non-governmental organization (NGO); Non-profit organization
- Headquarters: Lahore, Pakistan
- Services: Classical music promoters of Pakistani classical music

Lahore Music Forum (LMF) is a non profit organisation established in Lahore in the year 2011 for supporting classical musicians and with the avowed purpose of promoting classical music. and to raise the musical standards of classical music in Pakistan.

== Impact ==
The Lahore Music Forum, since its inception, has played a key role in providing a platform for upcoming artists, provided access to other artists and maestros, exposure to artists via social media and created a focal point for music lovers and connoisseurs to come together to support classical music.
