= Khan Tehsil =

Pakistani folk singer (c. 1931–2016

- Born: c. 1931; Khyber Pakhtunkhwa, Pakistan
- Origin: Afghanistan
- Died: 2016 (aged 84–85) Khyber Pakhtunkhwa, Pakistan
- Genres: Folk
- Occupation: Folk singer
- Instruments: Rabab, harmonium

Khan Tehsil (c. 1931 – 2016) was a Pakistani folk singer of the Pashto language.

== Biography ==
He was born around 1931 in Nowshera, Khyber Pakhtunkhwa. He lived a nomadic life, shifting from one place to another, spending most of his life between Timergara and Nowshera.

He started his career as a wedding singer in his hometown, Lakki Marwat, with another Pasto singer, Zarsanga. He sang around four hundred uncertain albums, including some on Radio Pakistan, Peshawar. He was introduced to radio by music producer Rashid Ali Dehqaan Dawar and director Mahmoob Ali Khan.

=== Personal life ===
He suffered financial crises in his last days, and later former provincial information minister Mian Iftikhar Hussain gave him PKR100,000 after he requested assistance from the government.

=== Death ===
He was suffering multiple health complications several years before he died at his home in March 2016. He is buried in a cemetery near the Risalpur area of Nowshera.
