= Sharif Khan Poonchwaley =

Musician (1926-1980)

Mohammad Sharif Khan (Born in 1926, Poonch, British India – Died 26 May 1980, Pakistan) known as Ustad Sharif Khan Poonchwaley was a classical player of the sitar, vichitra veena and raza been (rudra veena) in the Hindustani classical music tradition.

== Career ==
Sharif Khan was born at Hisar, now in Haryana, India in a family of musicians. He learned sitar from his father Ustad Rahim Bakhsh Khan, who himself was a student of Ustad Imdad Khan. His father, in fact, was a court musician of the Raja of Poonch. Sharif Khan Poonchwaley learned vichitra veena from Ustad Abdul Aziz Khan Beenkar.

Ustad Sharif Khan Poonchwaley belongs to Etawah gharana (Imdadkhani gharana) (traditional school) of sitar. He performed as a young sitar player at the YMCA Hall in Lahore in 1942. Some renowned luminaries of music also performed there with him including Bade Ghulam Ali Khan of Kasur, Ustad Fayyaz Khan of Baroda and Ustad Amir Khan of Indore. All of these musicians were invited to participate in the two-day music festival at Lahore in 1942. He played a key role in promoting the sitar in Pakistan.

He was a member of the early original team hired by the first Managing Director Aslam Azhar of Pakistan Television, Lahore Center to perform as a sitar player, when PTV first started broadcasts in 1964. Everywhere he went, he charmed audiences with his stylishness, registering the intricacies and subtleties of otherwise typical ragas. He also played the sitar for some of the film compositions of Pakistan's noted film music director Khwaja Khurshid Anwar and before the Partition of India in 1947, he played the sitar for film music director Amar Nath.

== Awards and recognition ==
- Pride of Performance Award in 1965 by the Government of Pakistan for his services to Pakistan.
- Sitara-i-Imtiaz (Star of Excellence) Award by the President of Pakistan in 1978.

== Legacy ==
In 2011, his son Ashraf Sharif Khan gives sitar performances at music festivals in Pakistan.
