= Ayesha Haroon =

Pakistani journalist (1977-2013)

Ayesha Haroon (1977–2013) was a Pakistani journalist, editor, and writer known for her clarity, courage, and professionalism. She began her career at The Frontier Post and later became an editor at The Nation and the Lahore editor of The News International. She also helped launch Waqt News TV as its news director, mentoring many young journalists. Even while battling cancer, she continued to write with honesty and compassion. In 2015, she was posthumously awarded the Pride of Performance for her contributions to journalism.

== Early life ==
Haroon received her education from the Kinnaird College For Women.

== Career ==
Haroon started her career with The Frontier Post as a writer in 1990 while she was still a student. After her graduation, she worked for The Frontier Post regularly as their magazine editor. Haroon later joined The Nation as an editor and reporter.

In 2007, she joined as the editor for the Lahore edition of The News International. Haroon also helped launch Waqt News TV channel and she worked as its news director.

== Personal life ==
She was married to Dr. Faisal Bari, economist and professor at Lahore University of Management Sciences (LUMS).

== Death ==
She was diagnosed with cancer aged 42. She received initial treatment at Shaukat Khanum Cancer Hospital. Later, when the disease recurred, her family shifted her to the Mount Sinai Hospital in New York. She lost her battle to cancer and died on February 3, 2013, in New York. Haroon was laid to rest in Lahore.

Arif Nizami, former editor of The Nation, stated that Haroon was very helpful to her juniors and co-workers. “She was a brave person and a sincere friend,” he said. Huma Ali, a senior journalist and a former president of the Lahore Press Club, said that "she would never refuse anyone seeking her help or guidance in professional matters.” Investigative reporter Umar Cheema said Haroon was a great journalist and charismatic editor who mentored a generation of young journalists.

== Awards and accolades ==
The President of Pakistan posthumously awarded Haroon the Pride of Performance on 23 March 2015.
