= Mushfiq Khwaja =

Pakistani writer, poet, researcher (1935–2005)

Mushfiq Khwaja (born Khwaja Abdul Hai; 19 December 1935 – 21 February 2005) was a Pakistani writer, columnist, translator, poet, and researcher of Urdu literature.
