= Nasir Jahan =

Religious poetry reciter (1927-1990)

Syed Nasir Jahan
- Born: 1927; Lucknow, British India
- Died: 6 December 1990 (aged 62–63); Karachi, Pakistan
- Occupations: Naat Khawan and Marsiya reciter
- Years active: 1954 - 1990
- Awards: Pride of Performance Award by the President of Pakistan in 1981

Nasir Jahan or Syed Nasir Jahan (1927 – 6 December 1990) was a Hamd, Na'at and Marsiya reciter who appeared for recitation of religious poetry on Pakistan Television and Radio Pakistan for many decades.

== Early life and education ==
Nasir Jahan was born in Lucknow, British India in 1927. He received his basic education in Lucknow and then migrated to the newly independent Pakistan in 1950 with his family and settled in Karachi.

== Career ==
Veteran Radio Pakistan personality, Z. A. Bukhari spotted him at an event in Karachi and saw his potential in reciting religious poetry. With his encouragement, Nasir Jahan recited a nazm written by Syed Aal-e-Raza at a 'Majlis-e-Sham-e-Gharibaan' program on Radio Pakistan in 1954. His presentation was well-liked by the public and later became known as 'Salam-e-Aakhir'. After the introduction of Pakistan television station in Karachi, he started making appearances on television as well.

== Selected naats, hamds and marsiyas ==
Title	Sung by	Lyrics by	Notes
Ghabraye Gi Zainab	Nasir Jahan	Chhannu Lal Dilgeer (Dilgeer Lucknavi) - a Hindu who later converted to Islam	A popular noha to this day by Nasir Jahan
Salam-e-Aakhir	Nasir Jahan	Syed Aal-e-Raza	A marsiya
Dil Jis Se Zinda Hai, Woh Tamanna Tum Hi Tau Ho	Nasir Jahan	Maulana Zafar Ali Khan	A Naat by Nasir Jahan
Meray Daawra Meray Kibriya	Nasir Jahan	Munawwar Badayuni	A Hamd by Nasir Jahan
Jab Madinay Ka Musafir Koi Paa Jaatan Hoon	Nasir Jahan	Amir Meenai	A Naat by Nasir Jahan

== Awards and recognition ==
- Pride of Performance Award by the President of Pakistan in 1981.

== Death ==
Nasir Jahan died on 6 December 1990 and was buried in Karachi, Pakistan.
