= Munir Sarhadi =

Pakistani musician

- Born: 1931; Peshawar, Pakistan
- Origin: Khyber Pakhtunkhwa
- Died: 23 May 1980 (aged 48–49) Peshawar
- Occupations: Instrumentalist, Folk singer
- Instruments: Sarinda (Bowed string instrument); Related to Sarangi
- Years active: 19xx – 1980
- Awards: Pride of Performance Award by the President of Pakistan in 1978

Munir Sarhadi (1931 – 23 May 1980) was a Pashtun-Pakistani instrumentalist, sarinda player and folk singer. As a musician, he represented Pakistan in several countries. In 1978, Munir was the recipient of the Pride of Performance, the highest civil award conferred by the Government of Pakistan.

== Early life and career ==
Munir Sarhadi was born in 1931 at Peshawar, Khyber Pakhtunkhwa. He was primarily playing the sarinda despite his parents wishing him to play a non-bowed string instrument. His father refused to teach him the traditional musical instrument in an effort to persuade him to play the string instrument besides sarinda. Munir was persistent in his pursuit of sarinda and later became quite good in playing it. He used to perform at many music festivals and music concerts. He was in great demand due to his skills all over Pakistan.

== Awards and recognition ==
- Pride of Performance Award by the Government of Pakistan in 1978.

== Death ==
Munir Sarhadi was passionate about sarinda musical instrument. He didn't earn much from his profession. His only source of income was his job at a broadcast network Radio Pakistan. The salary which was being offered to him, was inadequate to fulfil his medication requirements, and on 23 May 1980, he died in poverty at Peshawar, but died in a dignified manner.
