= Sharafat Ali Khan =

Pakistani classical singer (1955-2009)

Ustad Sharafat Ali Khan
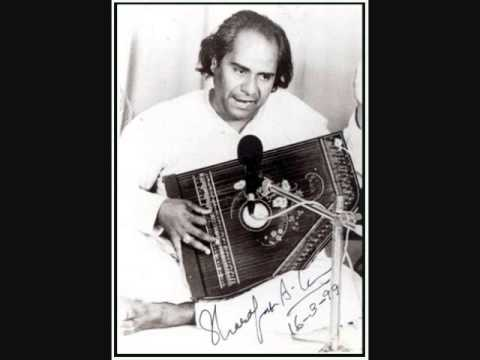

Background information
- Born: 1955; Multan, Pakistan
- Origin: Punjab
- Died: 30 November 2009 (aged 53–54) Lahore, Pakistan
- Genres: Thumri; Kafi; Khayal; Ghazal
- Occupation: Singer
- Instrument: Surmandal
- Education: Government College University, Lahore
- Father: Salamat Ali Khan
- Relatives: Shafqat Ali Khan (younger brother)
- Awards: Pride of Performance Award by the President of Pakistan in 2011; Saraswati Samman Award by the Government of India

Ustad Sharafat Ali Khan (1955 – 30 November 2009) was a Pakistani classical singer. He used to sing in various Hindustani classical genres such as thumri, kafi, khayal and ghazal throughout his career.

A recipient of the Pride of Performance award conferred by the Government of Pakistan, and Saraswati Samman award by the government of India, he was also awarded the Tamgha-e-Hunar award by Afghanistan.

== Biography ==
He was born in 1955 to Ustad Salamat Ali Khan in Multan, Pakistan. Graduated from the Government College, Lahore (now called Government College University, Lahore), he belonged to Sham Chaurasia gharana school of classical music. He started his singing career during his childhood. He was the elder brother of Ustad Shafqat Ali Khan and nephew of Sakhawat Ali Khan and Ustad Nazakat Ali Khan (1920s–1984). Sham Chaurasia gharana's ancestors included classical singers Mian Chand Khan and Mian Suraj Khan who were contemporaries of Mian Tansen in the court of Mughal emperor Akbar.

He was taught classical music by his father and participated in nearly one hundred foreign music festivals. According to a major newspaper of India, "[Sharafat Ali Khan] had enormous grip over thumri, kafi, khayal and ghazal". He also used to deliver lecturers on classical music at various universities.

== Awards ==
- Pride of Performance Award by the President of Pakistan in 2011.
- Saraswati Samman award by the Government of India.
- Tamgha-e-Hunar (Medal of Skill) award by the Government of Afghanistan.

== Death ==
He was suffering from diabetes mellitus and hypertension and was bedridden for over three months and died late Monday on 30 November 2009 in Lahore, Pakistan at age 54 and is buried at the Charagh Shah Wali shrine, a cemetery in Lahore where his parents, grandmother and his father Salamat Ali Khan, two uncles Ustad Nazakat Ali Khan and Ustad Zakir Ali Khan are also buried.
