= Shafqat Ali Khan =

Pakistani singer

Ustad Shafqat Ali Khan
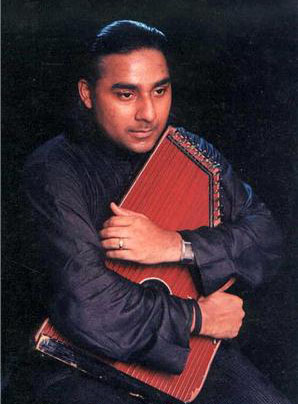
- Shafqat Ali Khan in 2009
- Born: 17 June 1972 (age 54)
- Occupation: classical music singer
- Years active: 1979 – present
- Father: Salamat Ali Khan (Sham Chaurasia gharana)
- Relatives: Sharafat Ali Khan (older brother)
- Awards: Pride of Performance Award (2009); Ambassador for Peace Award by Universal Peace Federation, Washington (2018)
- Website: shafqatalikhanmusic.com

Ustad Shafqat Ali Khan (born 17 June 1972) is a classical singer of the khyal vocal genre, from Pakistan, belonging to the Sham Chaurasi gharana.

The youngest son of Ustad Salamat Ali Khan, Shafqat began performing from the age of seven, when he appeared at the Lahore Music Festival at Lahore, Pakistan in 1979.

Ustad Shafqat Ali Khan is the custodian of a 400-year-old legacy of classical music. A major Pakistani English language newspaper reportedly commented about him, "This line of musicians began with Mian Chand Ali Khan and Mian Suraj Ali Khan who used to quell the heart and soul of Mughal Emperor Akbar by singing for him."

== Awards and recognition ==
Describing a performance by Ustad Shafqat Ali Khan in New York in 1992, The New York Times wrote, "Next to his father's more meditative style, Shafqat's exuberant complications, in which melodic gestures join hand-waving and synchronized finger-pointing to form an eloquent symbiosis, told an old story of youth and confidence next to age and reflection." The review also noted that the central patriarch, Ustad Salamat Ali Khan, was preceded by "Shafqat Ali Khan's more flamboyant approach to singing" and followed by a "long and leisurely three-way exchange" that included his other son, Sharafat Ali Khan. Khan has received numerous awards including the Amir Khusro Award in 1986, a Ghanda Award from New Delhi University in 1995 and a gold medal from Faisalabad University in 2004.

- Pride of Performance Award by the President of Pakistan in 2009.
- In 2018, Shafqat Ali Khan has been selected as ambassador for peace by Universal Peace Federation held in Washington, D.C.

In his message, Shafqat thanked his fans and said that through his music he had displayed the country's soft image and message of peace in the world.

== Career ==
Besides performing in the United States, India, Pakistan and Bangladesh, Ustad Shafqat Ali Khan has performed concerts throughout Europe and in Canada. His recording labels are His Master's Voice, EMI (India), EMI (Pakistan), WaterLily Acoustics (USA), MegaSound (India) and Folk Heritage (Pakistan).

Ustad Shafqat Ali Khan's performances at the Smithsonian Institution in the United States in 1988 and 1996 helped him establish himself as an important Hindustani classical music performer. According to a major newspaper of Pakistan, he has a 'magnetic stage presence and is known for his mastery of rhythm and ability to connect with audiences".

Ustad Shafqat Ali Khan feels that since classical music is not commercial, all classical singers and other persons related to classical music cannot earn enough to make a decent living for themselves. So they should be given additional monthly support income by the Pakistani government.

Ustad Shafqat Ali Khan has many students all over India and Pakistan. He has two sons, Faizan Ali Khan and Nadir Ali Khan, they are singing with their father in concerts these days.
