= Salamat Ali Khan =

Pakistani vocalist, touring artist (1932–2001)

Ustad Salamat Ali Khan

Background information
- Born: 12 December 1932; Hoshiarpur, British India
- Origin: Punjab
- Died: 11 July 2001 (aged 68) Lahore, Punjab, Pakistan
- Genres: Khyal; Tarana; Thumri; Kafi
- Occupations: Vocalist, singer of hindustani classical music (sham chaurasia gharana)
- Instruments: Vocals, swarmandal
- Years active: c. 1942 – 2001
- Formerly of: All India Radio
- Spouse: Razia Begum
- Children: Sharafat Ali Khan, Shafqat Ali Khan, Sukhawat Ali Khan, Riffat Sultana
- Father: Ustad Vilayat Ali Khan
- Relatives: Nazakat Ali Khan (brother); Ustad Zakir Ali Khan (brother); Rafaqat Ali Khan (nephew); Ustad Sain Karim (grandfather)

Ustad Salamat Ali Khan (12 December 1932 – 11 July 2001) was a Pakistani vocalist and touring artist known for his contribution to the Hindustani classical music.

Widely regarded as one of the greatest classical singers of the Indian subcontinent, he was active in the music industry, particularly in classical music after the partition of the Indian subcontinent; however, he earned his recognition before he migrated to Pakistan. In 1969, he appeared in Edinburgh Festival, earning him international recognition. He visited several countries, including India after partition, where he participated in music concerts and the All India Music Conference in Calcutta. During unstable India–Pakistan relations, he visited India along with his brother Nazakat Ali Khan in 1953, where his music concert was also attended by Jawaharlal Nehru, the first prime minister of India.

== Biography ==
Born in Hoshiarpur, British India in Sham Chaurasia gharana, he belonged to a family of musicians and was influenced by khyal, a style of Hindustani classical music. After he appeared in music concerts, Sham Chaurasia gharana earned recognition in the Indian subcontinent.

He married Razia Begum, with whom he had eight children, four daughters and four sons. He trained two of his sons, Sharafat Ali Khan and Shafqat Ali Khan, in classical music, leading the Sham Chaurasi gharana to retain its position in traditional music.

Earlier, Salamat (the lead singer) along with his brother (collectively known as the Ali brothers) was introduced to singing at the age of twelve by his father, Ustad Vilayat Ali Khan,. After learning music, he went to Calcutta (modern-day Kolkata) where he appeared in a music conference in 1945 and later in 1956 as well. The brothers Nazakat Ali Khan (1928–1984) and Salamat Ali Khan (1934–2001) had their debut performance on All India Radio, Delhi in 1942, when Salamat was only 8.

They went to Amritsar for a memorable concert:

"When the performance started, it seemed like a feast of musical notes had descended upon us in the audience. Every member of the audience was amazed and in complete awe of the duo. It was almost unbelievable that boys of that age could give such a fine performance. When the drut portion started, the brothers gave a blazing display of taans, sargams and layakari, which left the audience stunned".

His family later migrated to Lahore in 1947 following the partition of India.

Prior to migrating to Multan, he appeared in Harballabh Sangeet Sammelan in 1941. In 1955, he returned from Multan and went to his then hometown, Lahore. He was later assigned music conferences by the All India Radio and worked for the station for over ten years. He later quit the job following the Indo-Pakistani War of 1965 and subsequently went to Pakistan. As a solo singer, he participated in several music concerts in England, United States, Holland, Scotland, Germany, Italy, Switzerland, Afghanistan, Nepal and Singapore, as well as Pakistan.

In 1973, he and Nazakat parted ways over personal issues and their musical partnership came to an end; Salamat later continued as a solo singer. A number of their recordings exist from their very fruitful partnership until 1973. Subsequently, due to differences over finances, they broke up, and then Nazakat Ali Khan died in 1984, but Salamat Ali Khan continued singing along with his sons Sharafat Ali Khan and Shafqat Ali Khan, who continue the Sham Chaurasia tradition.

Notable students (shagird) of Ustad Salamat Ali Khan include Ustad Hussain Baksh Gullo, Ustad B S Narang, Ustad Shafqat Ali Khan, Abida Parveen, and many more.

== Awards ==
Year	Award	Result	Ref.
1977	Pride of Performance	Won	
1996	Sitara-i-Imtiaz (Star of Excellence) award by the President of Pakistan	Won	

- In 1956, after his concert in Calcutta, the leading music maestros of India declared Salamat Ali Khan the outstanding vocalist of the Indian subcontinent.

== Death ==
He died from kidney failure in Lahore on 10 July 2001 and is buried in Charagh Shah Wali shrine where his brothers, spouse and his eldest son, Sharafat Ali Khan are also buried.
