= Sham Chaurasia gharana =

Indian musical organization

Sham Chaurasi Gharana
- Formation: 16th century
- Founders: Chand Khan, Suraj Khan
- Founded at: Shamchaurasi, Hoshiarpur, Mughal India
- Purpose: Hindustani classical music

Sham Chaurasi Gharana is a vocal gharana (a musical family's style of singing) in Hindustani classical music known for the singing of vocal duets. It is also known as the cradle of drupad.

It is one of the four singing gharanas of Punjab; the other three are: Patiala, Talwandi and Kapurthala. It is most notably represented in modern times by the late brothers Nazakat Ali Khan and Salamat Ali Khan.

== History ==
The gharana is believed to have been founded in the 16th century by Chand Khan and Suraj Khan who were contemporaries of Tansen at the court of Mughal emperor Akbar. Successive generations of musicians in the gharana specialised in the dhrupad form of singing and evolved a tradition of duet vocal (jugalbandi) performances. Meer Baksh and Khairdeen, Karam Elahi Khan, Vilayat Ali and Hadayat Khan, Ghulam Shabir Khan and Ghulam Jafar Khan, Nazakat Ali and Salamat Ali are noted practitioners of jugalbandi from this gharana.

The gharana is centered at Shamchaurasi in the Hoshiarpur district of Punjab, India; alternate spellings include Shamchurasi. An explanation of the gharana name is that sham is taken from the name of the Sufi saint, Sant Shami Shah and (chaurasi =84) was named after a cluster of 84 villages which constituted a land revenue unit. According to one legend, the founders were given a parcel of land here as a grant to them by Mughal Emperor Akbar. In an alternate version of the origin, the Mughal Emperor Muhammad Shah "Rangila" was said to have been so impressed by the gharana that he gave all income from the 84 ('Chaurasi' being the Urdu translation of the number) local villages, to the Sufi saint Sant Shami Shah.

== Nazakat and Salamat Ali Khan ==
Around the turn of the century, the gharana was represented by Vilayat Ali Khan, who was noted for his dhrupad singing. His sons were Salamat Ali Khan, Nazakat Ali Khan, Tasaddaq Ali Khan, Akhter Ali Khan and Zakir Ali Khan.

The brothers Nazakat Ali Khan (1928–1984) and Salamat Ali Khan (1934–2001) had their debut performance on All India Radio, Delhi in 1942, when Salamat was only 8. They went to Amritsar for a memorable concert:

"When the performance started, it seemed like a feast of musical notes had descended upon us in the audience. Every member of the audience was amazed and in complete awe of the duo. It was almost unbelievable that boys of that age could give such a fine performance. When the drut portion started, the brothers gave a blazing display of taans, sargams and layakari, which left the audience stunned".:

After the 1947 partition of India, the family first moved to Multan, Pakistan and later moved to Lahore. They emerged as one of the leading performers of classical music in Pakistan. Famous Indian playback singer Lata Mangeshkar once reportedly said that Ustad Salamat Ali Khan was the greatest classical vocalist of the Indian subcontinent.

A number of their recordings exist from their very fruitful partnership until 1974. Subsequently, due to differences over finances, they broke up, and then Nazakat Ali Khan died in 1984, but Salamat Ali Khan continued singing along with his sons Sharafat Ali Khan and Shafqat Ali Khan, who continue the Sham Chaurasia tradition. Salamat's second eldest son, Latafat Ali Khan is an exponent of Ghazal, Thumri and Kafi singing.

Notable students (shagird) of Ustad Salamat Ali Khan include Ustad Hussain Baksh Gullo, Ustad B S Narang, Ustad Shafqat Ali Khan, Abida Parveen, and many more.

== Awards and recognition ==
Ustad Salamat Ali Khan of the Sham Chaurasia gharana was awarded the Pride of Performance Award in 1977 by the President of Pakistan.
