= List of Sindhi singers =

Sindhi music is popular in Pakistan and some parts of India. There have been several world-famous Sindhi singers who have performed in Sindh and abroad .This is a list of notable Sindhi singers.

== A ==
- Abida Parveen
- Allan Fakir
- Arshad Mehmood
- Atif Aslam

== B ==
- Bhagat Kanwar Ram
- Bhagwanti Navani

== F ==
- Fozia Soomro

== J ==
- Jalal chandio

== M ==
- Mai Bhagi
- Manzoor Sakhirani
- Master Chander
- Master Muhammad Ibrahim
- Muhammad Juman
- Muhammad Yousuf

== N ==
- Noor Bano

== R ==
- Rubeena Qureshi
- Runa Laila

== S ==
- Saif Samejo, The Sketches
- Sanam Marvi
- Sarmad Sindhi
- Shazia Khushk
- Suhrab Faqir

== V ==
- Vishal Dadlani

== Z ==
- Zarina Baloch
- Zeb-un-Nissa (singer)
