= Pakistani folk music =

Pakistani folk music refers to the local genre of folk music that originates from Pakistan.

== Major folk singers ==
- Malika Pukhraj (1912 - 2004) (sang in Kashmiri Dogari Pahari language)
- Tufail Niazi (1916 - 1990) (sang in Punjabi language)
- Alam Lohar (1928 - 1979) (sang in Punjabi language, especially famous for popularizing Jugni folk songs)
- Arif Lohar (he is maintaining his father Alam Lohar's tradition as well as updating it by using more modern musical instruments)
- Pathanay Khan (1926 - 2000) (sang in Saraiki language)
- Muhammad Juman (1935 - 1990) (sang in Sindhi and Saraiki languages)
- Reshma (1947 - 2013) (sang in Punjabi and Saraiki languages)
- Inayat Hussain Bhatti (1928 - 1999) (sang in Punjabi as well as Saraiki languages)
- Allan Faqir (1932 - 2000) (sang in Sindhi language)
- Jamal-ud-Din Faqir (1952 - 2016)
- Faiz Mohammad Baloch (1901 - 1982) (sang in Balochi language)
- Farida Khanum (born 1929) (sings in Punjabi language)
- Abida Parveen (born 1954) (sings in Sindhi & Punjabi language)
- Attaullah Khan Esakhelvi (born 1951) (sings in Saraiki language)
- Suraiya Multanikar (born 1940) (sings in Saraiki language)
- Saieen Zahoor (born 1945) (sings in Punjabi language)
- Iqbal Bahu (1944 - 2012) (sings in Punjabi language)
- Ghulam Ali (born 1940) (sings in Punjabi language)
- Shaukat Ali (1944 - 2021) (sang in Punjabi language)
- Surriya Khanum (sings in Punjabi and Saraiki languages)
- Hamid Ali Bela (died 2001) (sang in Punjabi language)
- Sadiq Fakir (1967 - 2015)
- Sanam Marvi (sings in Punjabi, Sindhi and Saraiki languages)
- Rahim Shah (born 1975) (sings in Pashto language)
- Nazia Iqbal (sings in Pashto language)
- Gul Panra (sings in Pashto Language)
- Shazia Manzoor (sings in Punjabi language)
- Naseebo Lal (sings in Punjabi language)
- Shazia Khushk
- Zarsanga (sings in Pashto language)
- Mai Dhai (sings in Sindhi language)
- Akhtar Chanal Zahri (sings in Balochi language)
- Ali Zafar (partially)
- Malkoo (sings in Punjabi language)
- Zeek Afridi (sings in Pashto language)
- Hamayoon Khan (sings in Pashto language)

== Kafi ==
The Sindhi kafi is an indigenous musical form of Sindh and Punjab, Pakistan. The word kafi, is of Arabic origin, used in the sense of "final" or "enough" in the expression “Allah Kafi”, which means, “God Almighty is Supreme”. Thus the kafi is a devotional form of music composed in a particular form derived from a mixture of classical, semi-classical, and light music forms (specifically, the khayal, tappa, thumri, and geet). The mystic poetry of the Sufi saints is usually sung in this mode.

There is a Punjabi variant of kafi singing. Like Sindhi kafi, the mood and the theme of Punjabi Kafi may also be termed as secular and humanistic. In their Kafis, Shah Hussain (16th century) and Bulleh Shah (18th century) have adopted a strategy to communicate their thoughts, serving the humanity in a powerful and effective way. The satirical tone of these kafis, sometimes, depicts true picture of political situations and social conditions of their own days.

The Sindhi kafi is short, simple, and lucid in composition and tone. Shah Abdul Latif Bhitai, a renowned Sufi saint and mystic poet of Sindh (d. 1752), contributed considerably to the development of the Sindhi kafi, writing many verses and composing tunes which he named “The Sur of Shah Latif”. His tunes are still popular.

The late Zahida Parveen was a master of kafi singing. Her daughter, Shahida Parveen, possesses her mother's command of the form and her devotional urge. Yet today's trends, and perhaps necessity, have led her away from kafis and towards the geet, the ghazal, semi-classical and folk forms. Abida Parveen is another renowned kafi singer of Sindh, but she, too, sings in many other genres.

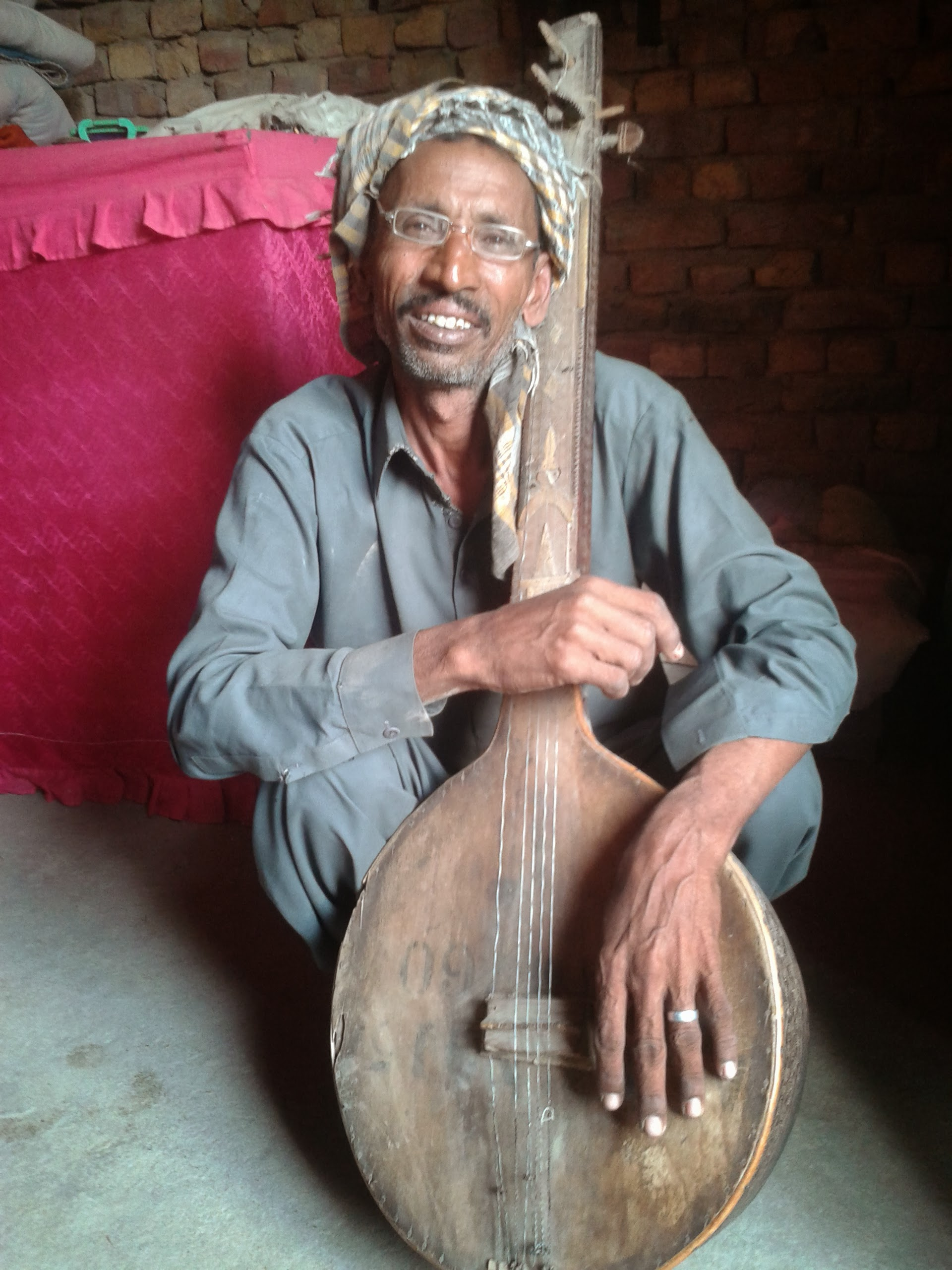
Folk artist with an accent music instrument

== See also ==
- Music of Pakistan
