= Sindhi music =

Traditional music of Sindh, Pakistan

Sindhi folk music (Sindhi: سنڌي لوڪ موسيقي) is traditional folk music and singing from Sindh, which is sung and generally performed in 5 genres that originated in Sindh, the first genre "Bait" styles. The Bait style is vocal music in Sanhoon (low voice) and Graham (high voice). Second style "Waee" instrumental music is performed in a variety of ways using a string instrument. Waee, also known as Kafi. Sindhi folk music was popularized by great Sindhi sufi poet Shah Abdul Latif Bhitai.

== Sindhi folk genres or singing styles ==
Besides Sindhi folk genres of Bait, Wae and Kafi other Sindhi folk genres include;

- Lada/Sehra/Geech: in this genre folk songs are song for special days and occasions like weddings, engagements, birth of a child etc, Sehra and Lada are genre of expressing emotions like joy, happiness, sadness etc, it is sung by females in a group, with various Sindhi folk musical instruments like dhul, Thali, kanjiri, ghungro etc.
- Dhammal: this is a folk style of singing as well as a folk religious dance, the folk instruments like Nagara, Shernai, gharyal, gughu etc are played.
- Dohiraa
- Bhagat
- Kalaam
- Classical
- Molood: is a Sindhi form of poetry about Prophet Muhammad's life, with poems consisting of between five and ten verses. Mauluds are sung in a group of men in unique high and low voices.
- Moro: this folk style of singing is usually played in mountainous region of Sindh in Kohistan by the locals.
- Hamarcho: this is harvesting folk songs, sung by farmers, their families, friends, neighbours and relatives who come together and sing Hamarcho in a group, one person leading while others sing together when crops grow.
- Osara/Paar: this is style of singing for mourning for loved ones, in which the close relatives of the dead would weep while singing in sad style the phrases generally are the memories, praises and remembrance of the dead.
- Doro: this folk style of singing is performed by women of Thar desert region of Sindh.

Today other modern genres are also being introduced.

== Indigenous Sindhi Tala ==
The traditional indigenous Sindhi Taals are:

Bhairvi, Chainchal, Kalwarro, Chlo, Adhayo, Aulang, Mool, Wahval, Jhumir, Haswari, Naushahi, Jhamti, Lamadi, Batthi-Jhalko, Tallu, Pachhand etc.

== Communities ==
The folk Sindhi musician communities whose ancestral work is singing and playing music instruments, are Manganhar, Langha, Mirasis and Dumria, these communities on every special occasions were invited to sing folk ceremonial songs.

The Sheedi (African origin) community in Sindh is also traditionally known for playing Sindhi folk music on weddings and on other ceremonies, especially in Lār region of Sindh, where mostly they live, the Sindhi music has also been influenced by these Sheedi music in lower Sindh, the Sheedi community have their own style of folk music and dance, which is quite popular in Sindh. In lower Sindh (Lār) region the Sheedi community are the well known folk singers, musicians and dancers, the women are specially invited in weddings, engagements and on other ceremonious occasions to sing (Sehra, Lada and Geech). The modern Sindhi wedding songs use the Sheedi music beats as well.

== Music Styles ==
The Sindhi music generally has three or four styles, the folk music, classical music, sufi music and modern style music, many modern singers experiment with western music, rapping, hiphop and jazz is being introduced by the young musicians.

== Sindhi Sufi music ==
=== Shah Ja Raaga/Sura ===
The traditional compilations of Shah Jo Risalo by Shah Abdul Latif Bhitai include 30 Sura (chapters) which are sang as raags. The oldest publications of Shah Jo Risalo contained 36 Suras, but later six of the Suras were rejected because the language and content did not correspond to the style of the Shah. Recently, Nabi Bakhsh Baloch, the most famous Sindhi linguist has compiled and published a new publication after 32 years of research, into popular culture and the history of the Sindhi language. The famous singer Abida Parveen has recorded the entire Shah's Suras on her 11th volume CD Shah Jo Risalo, released in December 2013.

The 30 traditional Suras included in Shah Jo Risalo are:

- Kalyaan
- Yaman Kalyaan
- Khambhat/Khanbhat
- Suri Raag
- Samundi
- Suhni
- Sassui Aburi
- Maazuri
- Desi
- Kohyari
- Hussaini
- Leela Chanesar
- Mumal Rano
- Marvi/Marui
- Kaamod
- Ghatu
- Sorath
- Kedaro
- Sarang
- Assaa
- Rippa
- Khahori
- Ramkali
- Kaapa'iti
- Purab
- Karayal
- Pirbhati
- Dahar
- Bilawal
- Bervo Sindhi

== Sindhi folk musical instruments ==
Common instruments used in Sindhi regional music include:

- Ektara known as Yaktaro in Sindhi
- Tanpura known as Tamburo/Dambooro in Sindhi
- Alghozo Flute
- Surando
- Bansuri known as Bansri/Basri in Sindhi
- Pungi known as Been/Murli in Sindhi
- Narr
- Naghara
- Dhol/Dhul
- Dholak
- Harmonium
- Borrindo
- Rabbab
- Khartal/Chapri/Dando
- Benjo
- Chang/Morchang
- Gharo/Dilo
- Shehnai/Sharnai
- Sarangi
- Tabla
- Khamach/Khamachi
- Kanjhyun/Talyoon
- Ravanhatha
- Thaali
- Kanjiri
- Muto
- Gugu/Ghugu
- Bagpipes
- Tagari
- Mugarman used in Sheedi folk music

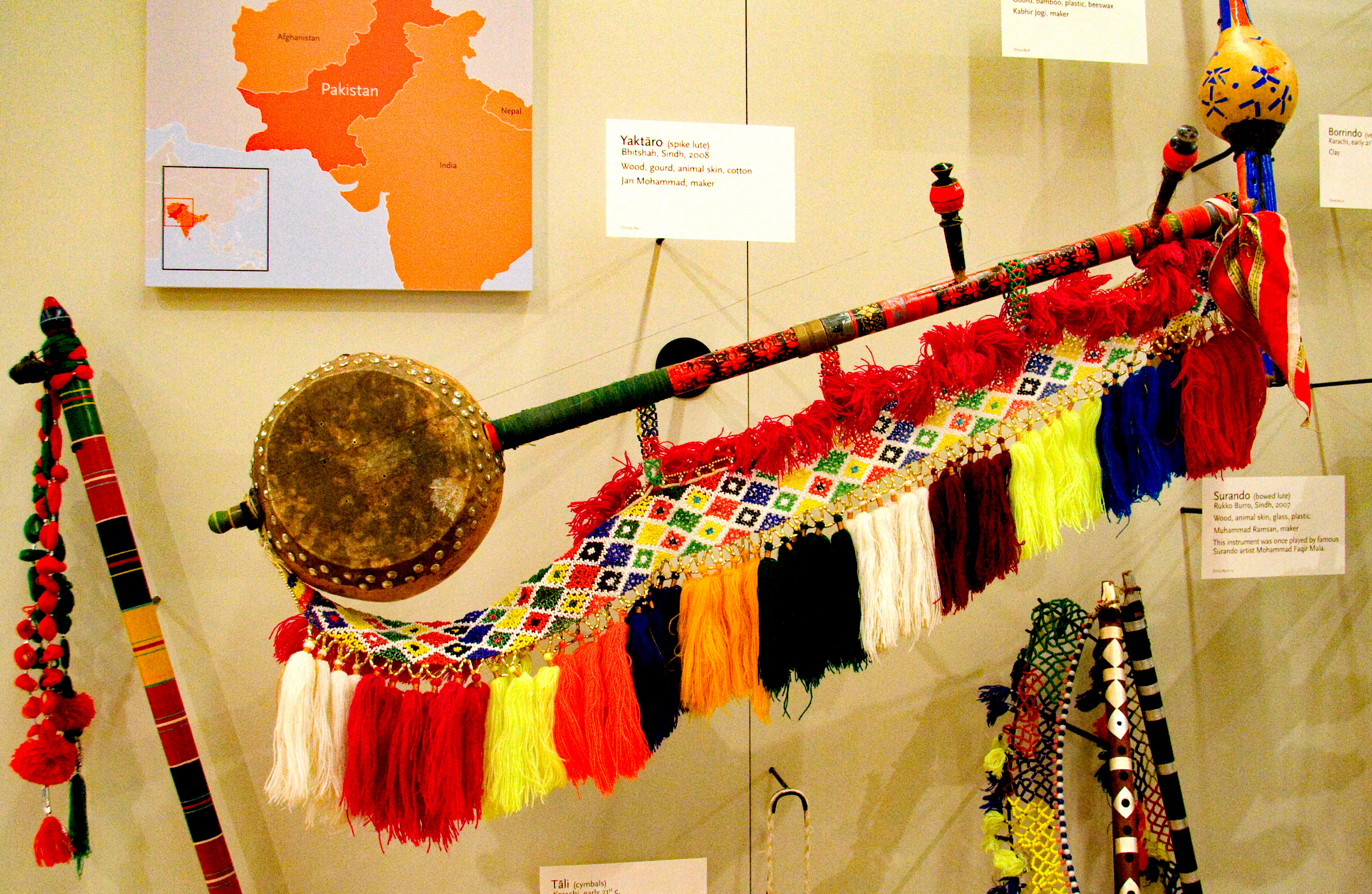
Sindhi music instruments displayed at Musical Instrument Museum - Phoenix, AZ.

== Notable Sindhi musicians ==
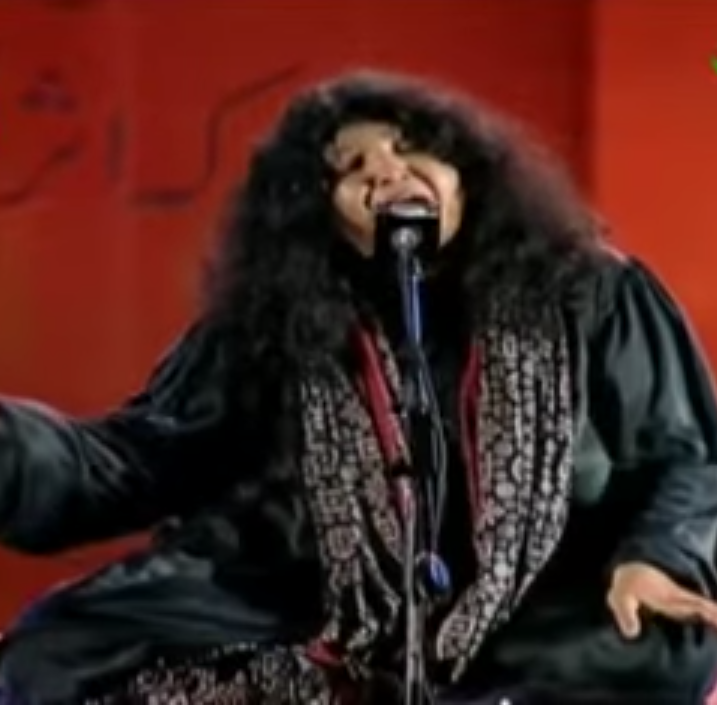
Abida Parveen is a musician hailing from Sindh

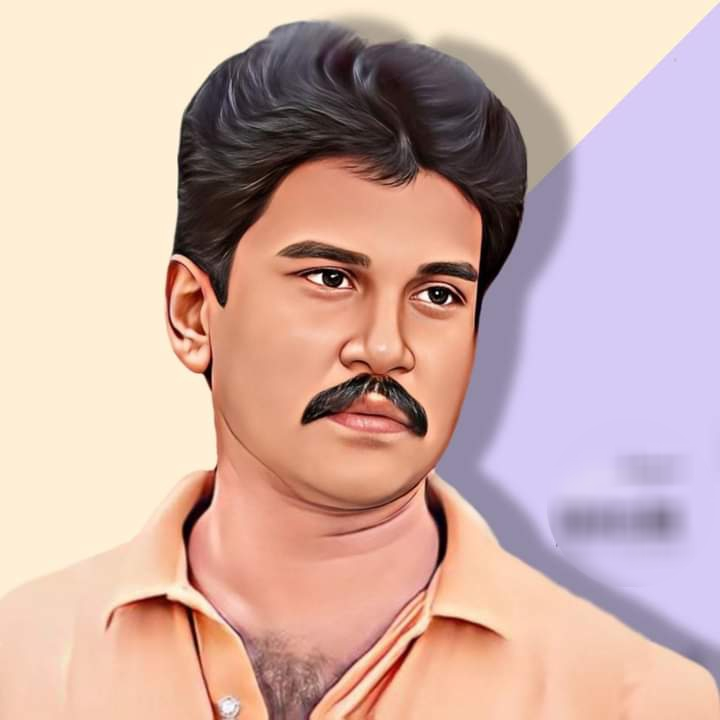
Sarmad Sindhi the greatest singer in golden era of sindhi literature.

- Abida Parveen
- Allan Faqir
- Sarmad Sindhi
- Humera Channa
- Mai Bhaghi
- Manzoor Sakhirani
- Noor Bano
- Rubina Qureshi
- Saif Samejo
- Sanam Marvi
- Sohrab Fakir
- Ustad Manzoor Ali Khan
- Ustad Mohammad Ibrahim
- Ustad Muhammad Juman
- Ustad Muhammad Yousuf
- Ustad Misri Faqeer Makhmoor
- Zarina Baloch
- Zeb-un-Nissa
- Dhol Faqeer
- Jalal Chandio
- Fozia Soomro
- Sohrab Faqir
- Bhagwanti Navani

== Sindhi songs ==
Some famous Sindhi songs include "Ho Jamalo", "Sindh Muhinji Amma", "Parchan Shaal Pavar Dhola" and "Peren Pavandi Saan." Waheed Ali, Barkat Ali, Misri Faqeer and Khatadar Ahiyan are well-known Sindhi musicians.

== See also ==
- List of Sindhi singers
- Folk dances of Sindh
