= Ali Gul Sangi =

Sindhi Language poet (1952–2014)

- علي گل سانگي
- Born: 14 September 1952; Dodai, District Larkana, Sindh, Pakistan
- Died: 29 April 2014 (aged 61)
- Occupations: Poet, journalist, politician
- Writing career
- Genres: Kalam, kafi, geet, bait
- Subjects: Love, romance, brotherhood

Ali Gul Sangi (14 September 1952 – 29 April 2014) was a poet, author, political activist, and journalist of Sindh, Pakistan. His Urdu and Sindhi poetry was sung by a number of singers including Mehnaz, Ustad Muhammad Yousuf, Manzoor Sakhrani and others.

== Biography ==
Ali Gul Sangi was born in a landlord family on 14 September 1952 at village Dodai, in Sindh's Larkana District. His father's name was Roshan Ali Sangi. He passed matriculation in 1990 as a private candidate. He also graduated as an external candidate. He was elected as chief of the Sangi tribe of Sindhi Muslims on 11 September 1983. He was a popular political and social leader in his native area. He served as Chairman of Taluka Council Larkana, Chairman of Union Council Dodai and Nazim of Fatehpur Union Council. Politically, he was affiliated with Pakistan Muslim League Functional.

He was also an active journalist. He served in Daily Mehran and was president of Larkana Press Club for 11 years.

He was a well known poet. His poetry is especially popular in rural areas of Sindh. He started composing poems at the age of 18–19 years. His poetry is inspired by classical poets Jaffer Faqir Panhwer and Menhal Faqir. Most of his poetry is in Sindhi language but he also wrote some Urdu poems. A number of popular singers of Sindh and Pakistan, including Mehnaz, Ustad Manzoor Ali Khan, Ustad Muhammad Yousuf, Sarmad Sindhi and Manzoor Sakhirani have sung his poetry.

Ali Gul Sangi died on 29 April 2014 in Karachi and was buried in his hometown.

== Books ==
Sangi authored a dozen of books, among which the following books have been published. Other books are yet to be published.

- Pipran men Pengha (Sindhi: پپرن ۾ پينگه), 1992
- Kandhia Nisriya Kana (Sindhi: ڪنڌيءَ نسريا ڪانه), 1994
- Paren Pandh Kandiyas (Sindhi: پيرين پنڌ ڪندياس), 1995
- Naina Galhaeen tha (Sindhi: نيڻ ڳالهائين ٿا), 1997
- Gujara men Gaju (Sindhi: گجر ۾ گج), 1998
