= Suraiya Khanum =

Folk singer of Pakistan

Surriya Khanum
- Born: Surriya Khanum
- Occupation: Singer
- Years active: 1977 – present
- Known for: Her soulful singing of Sufi music Pakistani folk music, Pakistani classical music
- Notable credit(s): Strings band, Coke Studio (Pakistan)

Surriya Khanum, also spelled Suraiya Khanum, is a veteran Pakistani folk and classical singer from the Punjab. She is known for her soulful performances and singing Sufi music on Pakistan Television and other TV channels.

== Career ==
Suraiya Khanum started her singing career on Radio Pakistan's Multan Station in 1977. She was musically influenced by Ustad Muhammad Juman. Ustad Nusrat Fateh Ali Khan trained her for 8 years and she was also formally trained by Ustad Faiz Ahmed for 21 years. Musically, she is inspired by the veteran folk singer Tufail Niazi as well as Reshma and Iqbal Bano.

She appeared as a featured artist on the 2015 eighth season of popular music reality television series Coke Studio Pakistan. She sang a popular wedding song also sung earlier by veteran folk singer Tufail Niazi "Chirya Da Chamba" along with Anwar Maqsood which was praised for its music, composition and the beautiful narration of a letter by Anwar Maqsood. It was stated that the song "created a memorable experience for the audience".

== Discography ==
=== Singles ===
- MenDa Ishq Vi Toon (a Kafi song written by the 19th century Sufi poet Khawaja Ghulam Farid). This folk song has a long history and was also sung earlier by Inayat Hussain Bhatti and Pathanay Khan
- Toonba – Turr Multanon Toonba Aaya
- Raataan Jaagni Aan
- Yaar Toon Kithay Vain
- Way Main Chori Chori Tere Naal La Layyan Akhhaan Wey (a Punjabi song written by the poet Manzoor Hussain Jhalla)
- Ramzaan KehRay Velay Laaiyan
- Mera Chann Masta
- Bhul Jaania Kisay De Naal Pyaar Na
- Saaiyaan
- Bol Mitti Daya Baawia (folk song originally sung by Alam Lohar)

=== Coke Studio (Pakistan) ===
- Chiryan Da Chamba (2015) (song performance also features a reading by Anwar Maqsood)

This above folk song is about the parting of a father and his daughter at her wedding. The departing daughter is reminiscing about the time she spent at her family home.

A major Pakistani English-language newspaper comments about above Coke Studio performance: "While the music is minimal and good enough to form its bedrock, Khanum's command on singing is intimidating."
