= Jalal Chandio =

Pakistani Sindhi and Saraiki folk singer (1944–2001)

Legend of Sindh Jalal Chandio جلال چانڊيو
- Born: Jalal Khan Chandio; 1944; Harpal Jo Hat, near Phul Naushahro Feroze District, Sindh, Pakistan
- Origin: Naushahro Feroze
- Died: 10 January 2001 (aged 57) Karachi Sindh
- Genres: Film music; Kafi; Sindhi
- Occupations: Playback singer, Artist, Public Singer
- Instruments: Harmonium, Yaktaro Dholak
- Years active: 1970–1999

Jalal Chandio (Sindhi: جلال چانڊيو; born 1944) was a Sindhi folk singer. He was born in 1944 in the village of Harpal Jo Hat, Misri Wah, near Phul Naushahro Feroze District. He was the only expert of yaktara & Chapri at the time, and his singing style made him popular among Sindh and all of Pakistan. He died on 10 January 2001 due to kidney failure. He got lot of respect in all over Sindh as folk singer due to distinct style of playing folk music and singing.

== Early life ==
Jalal Chandio was born to Haji Faiz Muhammad Chandio, who owned a large number of cattle. Jalal Chandio was not interested in academics and thus remained a shepherd during his younger days. He has no formal education and over 10,000 songs recorded during his lifetime. As the first singer from Sindh and the star of a Sindhi movie, Jalal Chandio was the most in-demand performer of Sindhi classical music. He first began singing on Chapri and Yaktaro, and he called King of Yaktaro and Chapri in Sindh. Jalal Chandio was a prominent Sindhi singer who sang in the rhythms Kalwaro, Adho, Dedho, and Ekta. He ornamented the Yaktaro and Chapriyoon "Castanets" and sang songs about love.

== Singing career ==
Chandio was fond of singing since childhood, but his parents sent him to the village of Nawan Jatoi to learn the profession of tailoring instead. Disheartened, he left tailoring to start singing. His teacher was Fakir Ali Gul Mahar, who accompanied Chandio to almost all of his singing concerts. In 1973, Chandio began solo performances after receiving permission from his mentor.

He was an expert of Yaktara & Chapri (musical instruments). His singing style made him popular among his fans. He promoted the Yaktara and Chapri in Pakistani folk music.

== Jalal Chandio (movie) ==
A film Jalal Chandio was made in his lifetime in which Chandio played his own character.

== Credits ==
It is believed that Jalal Chandio released a thousand audio cassettes as well as ten thousand songs during his lifetime. Since he was unschooled, he would often memorize his own songs. He was known as the king of Sindhi singers because he promoted Sindhi songs worldwide when media was not common. He had possessed enormous qualities and most importantly generosity. It was reported that he gave his buffalo to an old lady whose buffalo was stolen. Thousands of listeners were captivated by his powerful, throaty voice, and some even got up to dance along with him. His most popular songs are 'Aao Ko Jana Pandh Kech Jo' and 'Hal Na Sharabi Chal Mata Nazar Lagai'

== Spiritual affiliation ==
Chandio was a spiritual disciple of Mahdi Shah of Shahpur Jehanian. He used to sing on Urs for almost all the saints out of his fondness for them. He had an affiliation with the famous Sindhi Poet Shah Abdul Latif Bhittai and therefore he performed on his many of his urs.

== Awards ==
He received several awards in his country and beyond. In 1999, the provincial Government of Sindh's Department of Culture and Tourism recognized Jalal's contribution to singing and awarded him the 'Latif Award'. Among the many awards that Jalal received, one came from the local Sindhi music maestro Ustad Manzoor Ali Khan, for his dedication to the profession.

== Death ==
During the beginning of 2000, Chandio became ill due to kidney failure and was admitted to Liaqat National Hospital Karachi before being discargched after one month of treatment. During his admission to the hospital, the then Culture Secretary Hameed Akhond supported him and provided a TV for watching cricket in his hospital room. In December 2000, he felt pain again in his kidney and was shifted to Hyderabad and then later to SIUT Karachi for proper medical treatment. Doctors advised that he was suffering last stage kidney failure and that he needed blood on a daily basis. He died on 10 January 2001 at about 10:30 hours at SIUT Karachi.

== Jalal Melo ==
An online digital festival on the occasion of the death anniversary of Jalal Chandio is held every year called Jalal Melo. The youth present Jalal Chandio's music and personal life in a unique way. Twitter is one of the top lists all across Pakistan when it comes to trending hashtags for Jalal Melo every year. Jalal Melo has been initiated by the World of Gypsies, Porhiyat Pressure Group and Fida Jatoi.
