= Bhit Ja Bhittai =

Pakistani Sindhi song

Bhit Ja Bhittai (Sindhi: ڀٽ جا ڀٽائي) is a popular Sindhi devotional song praising the Sufi saint Shah Abdul Latif Bhittai, who lived on the sand dunes of Sindh and who is widely considered to be the greatest poet of the Sindhi language. It has been sung by many Sindhi artists, such as Jalal Chandio, Mai Bhagi, Suhrab Faqir, and others as well.

More recently this song was presented in a new way by the Pakistani artist Shani Arshad. "Bhit ja Bhittai is not only the folk song but also the Qalam", Shani said. This song became very famous. Initially the song was a 40-second track advertisement for Telenor, then Shani decided to launch a full-length edition of the song.
