= Dama Dam Mast Qalandar =

Sufi song dedicated to Lal Shahbaz Qalandar

Dama Dam Mast Qalandar (transl. Every breath for the ecstasy of Qalandar) is a spiritual Sufi qawwali written in the honour of the most revered Sufi saint of Sindh, Lal Shahbaz Qalandar (1177–1274) of Sehwan Sharif. The origins of the poem are unknown, since no recordings or written documents exist mentioning it prior to the 1950s. However, legends around the Shrine of Lal Shahbaz Qalandar in Sehwan suggest that the original poem was initially written by the 13th-century Sufi poet Amir Khusrow, and modified by Bulleh Shah in the 18th century. The poem includes a reference to the town of Sehwan, and the word "Lal" can refer to Lal Shahbaz Qalandar as a young man, his legendary ruby glow, or his red dress. Bulleh Shah gave an entirely different color to the qawwali, adding verses in praises of Shahbaz Qalandar and giving it a large tint of Sindhi culture. It also venerates Ali, the cousin and son-in-law of Muhammad.

== History ==
The qawalli is a popular traditional Sindhi Sufi Islamic folk song across the northern Indian subcontinent, especially Punjab and Sindh, as well as Iran. The mystic poem is performed with dhamaal, devotional Sufi whirling for achieving spiritual ecstasy, to pay tribute to Lal Shahbaz Qalandar and also Ali.

Historian and anthropologist Michel Boivin writes that the term Jhulelal in the song was used by Sindhi Hindus historically to worship Jhulelal, an avatar of the god Varuna. The term was later used by Sufi Muslims in the song "Dama Dam Mast Qalandar". After the popularity of the song Lal Shahbaz Qalandar is often referred to as Jhulelal or Jhulelal Qalandar.

Various renditions of the song have been composed and performed by numerous composers and singers over the years. The Pakistani singers include Nusrat Fateh Ali Khan, Aziz Mian, Abida Parveen, Shazia Khushk, the Sabri Brothers, Reshma, Komal Rizvi, and Junoon. The song has also been performed by the Bangladeshi singer Runa Laila.

Indian artists who have covered the song include Hans Raj Hans, the Wadali brothers, Harshdeep Kaur, Nooran Sisters, Mika Singh (with Yo Yo Honey Singh; and solo in the 2013 film D-Day), Alisha Chinai (in the album Bombay Girl), Amit Kumar (in the 1978 film Nasbandi), Baba Sehgal and Alka Yagnik (in the 1994 film Hum Hain Bemisaal), Rekha Bhardwaj (in the 2013 film David), Rashi Salil Harmalkar (in the TV show Kullfi Kumarr Bajewala). In 2025 Runa Laila sang the song for Coke Studio Bangla

== Ashiq Hussain song ==
"Lal Meri Pat"

Song by Ashiq Hussain

from the album Jabroo
- Released: 1956
- Genre: Qawwali
- Composers: Ashiq Hussain & Fakir Syed Salahuddin
- Lyricists: Amir Khusrow, adapted by Bulleh Shah
- Producer: Fakir Syed Salahuddin

Audio sample
- file; help

Popular modern renditions of the song include the melody composed by Pakistani music composer Master Ashiq Hussain. Originally called "Lal Meri Pat", the song was initially composed for the 1956 Pakistani film Jabroo. It was sung by Inayat Hussain Bhatti, Fazal Hussain, and A.R. Bismil.

Contrary to popular legend, renowned Pakistani composer Ashiq Hussain only composed a dhamaal version of it. As Hussain himself put it, he was asked to compose the popular version at the request of Saghar Siddiqui, who only brought it to Hussain. Saghar Siddiqui's version is an edited version of the original poem.

Ashiq Hussain was reduced to poverty in later life, living in a slum at the Bazar-e-Hakiman in Lahore. When Hussain died in 2017, most Pakistanis were unaware that he was the original composer of the modern melody.

== Noor Jehan song ==
"Dama Dam Mast Qalandar"

Song by Noor Jehan

from the album Dillan Dey Soudey
- Released: 1969
- Genre: Qawwali
- Composer: Nazir Ali
- Lyricists: Amir Khusrow, adapted by Bulleh Shah

Audio sample
- file; help

The most popular modern rendition of the song, which includes Ashiq Hussain's melody, was "Dama Dam Mast Qalandar" from the 1969 Pakistani film Dillan Dey Soudey, where it was modified by Nazir Ali and sung by Noor Jehan. It was then sung by other Pakistani singers like Nusrat Fateh Ali Khan, Aziz Mian, Abida Parveen, Shazia Khushk, the Sabri Brothers, Reshma, Komal Rizvi, and Junoon. The song has also been performed by the Bangladeshi singer Runa Laila, and Indian artists like Hans Raj Hans, the Wadali brothers, Harshdeep Kaur, Nooran Sisters, and Mika Singh (with Yo Yo Honey Singh).

== Nusrat Fateh Ali Khan song ==
"Dam Mast Mast"

Song by Nusrat Fateh Ali Khan

from the album Mast Qalander (Vol 14)
- Released: 1991
- Genre: Qawwali
- Label: Oriental Star Agencies
- Composers: Nusrat Fateh Ali Khan; M. Arshad

Audio sample
- file; help

Pakistani musicians Nusrat Fateh Ali Khan and M. Arshad composed a new song inspired by "Dam Mast Qalandar", with a different melody and arrangement. It was sung by Khan and released as "Dam Mast Mast" in his 1991 album Mast Qalander (Vol 14). Khan also performed the song for the 1992 Pakistani film Boxer, in both Punjabi and Urdu. His song is variously called "Dam Mast Qalandar Mast Mast", "Dam Mast Qalandar" or "Mast Mast". In 2016, British-Azeri singer Sami Yusuf performed a rendition of Khan's song in his album Barakah.

The Bollywood music director Viju Shah used Khan's version to produce the hit song "Tu Cheez Badi Hai Mast Mast" sung by Kavita Krishnamurthy and Udit Narayan for the Bollywood film Mohra (1994), the soundtrack album of which sold more than 8 million units. In turn, "Tu Cheez Badi Hai Mast Mast" was remade as "Cheez Badi" by Neha Kakkar and Narayan for the 2017 film Machine.
