= Bilawal Belgium =

Background information
- Born: Muhammad Bilal; 1928
- Origin: Mirpurkhas, British India
- Died: 26 August 1977 (aged 48–49) Lahore, Pakistan
- Genres: Benju, Pakistan Classical Musician
- Occupations: Musician and composer

Muhammad Bilal, commonly known as Bilawal Belgium (1928 – 26 August 1977) was a Pakistani benju virtuoso and a classical music player and composer. He was recognized for his distinctive integration of the Banjo and Swarmandal. He mainly performed with Radio Pakistan, and is widely regarded as one of Pakistan's most important instrumentalists of all time.

== Early life ==
Belgium was born in Mirpurkhas in 1928. He belonged to the Makrani Baloch community (also known as Sheedi) of African descent. He was initially encouraged in his musical pursuits by his mother, Mahgi, a singer of note, and his father, Jhuk, who was a player of the kuzank instrument.

== Career ==
Bilawal got the title "Belgium" during early practice sessions at a shrine in Mirpurkhas, when a listener remarked that Bilawal played the banjo like a "Belgium", a comment that led to his popular moniker.

Bilawal faced initial resistance from music authorities. Broadcaster Zulfiqar Ali Bukhari reportedly opposed the inclusion of banjo in the Radio Pakistan orchestra. However, after hearing Bilawal perform, he consequently accepted the instrument and appointed Bilawal as a staff artist in 1950–1952.

He performed both solo and orchestral pieces on Radio Pakistan, Karachi, and also composed melodies for various vocalists. He also performed on television and stage, travelling to several countries as a member of Pakistan’s official music groups. He contributed the full background score and song compositions for the Sindhi film Tanjhiyoon Galhiyoon Sajan, featuring singers like Ahmed Rushdi, Rubina Qureshi, Muhammad Juman, and Hussain Bakhsh Khadim.

He later served as staff artist at the Central Production Unit of Pakistan Broadcasting Corporation in Lahore, a position he held until his death.

== Personal life and death ==
Belgium's family member Ghulam Abbas Baloch represented the Pakistan national football team in the 1960s. Bilawal died in 1977 in Lahore, and was buried in Karachi.

== Legacy ==
Belgium was recognized for his distinctive creation and integration of the Banjo and Swarmandal, which he would tune and play simultaneously to create regional folk melodies and classical compositions, primarily in Sindhi and Balochi languages. He is also known for promoting Sheedi culture into Pakistani national musical discourses and spotlight.
