= Ustad Noor Bakhsh =

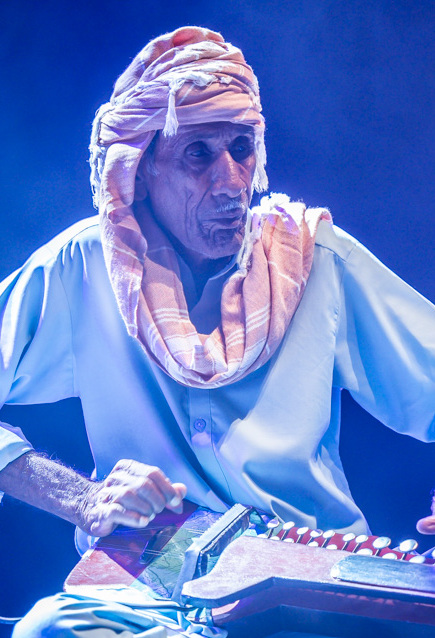

Background information
- Born: Noor Bakhsh c. 1945–1950; Makran, Balochistan, Pakistan
- Origin: Pasni, Balochistan, Pakistan
- Genres: Balochi folk, world music
- Occupation: Musician
- Instrument: Benju (electric)
- Years active: 1960s–present
- Labels: Honiunhoni, Hive Mind

Ustad Noor Bakhsh is a Pakistani musician from Balochistan, known internationally for his mastery of the benju, a keyed zither prominent in Balochi folk music. His style blends traditional Balochi melodies with South Asian, Persian, and popular musical influences.

== Early life and background ==
Noor Bakhsh was born into a nomadic shepherd family on the Makran coast of Balochistan, Pakistan. He grew up moving with livestock between coastal villages, eventually settling in Sindhi Paso near Pasni, a fishing port town. He began playing the benju as a child, learning from his father and local teachers.

== Instrument and musical style ==
The instrument most associated with Noor Bakhsh is the benju, a keyed zither widely used in Balochi and Sindhi music. He plays an electric benju, powered by a small amplifier often run on a motorcycle battery due to limited electricity in his village. His sound incorporates Balochi folk modes, Indian raga improvisation, Persian melodic ornamentation, and modern popular elements. Critics have described his performances as trance-like, meditative, and rich with emotional intensity.

== Career ==
Although he had been performing for decades in Balochistan, Noor Bakhsh achieved widespread recognition only in the early 2020s. In 2022, Pakistani anthropologist and musician Daniyal Ahmed recorded videos of him performing on a roadside; these went viral online, bringing him to international attention. That same year, he released his debut solo album Jingul on the label Honiunhoni, later distributed globally by Hive Mind Records. The album received critical acclaim and was praised for its “fluid virtuosity” and “cosmic yet grounded sound.” In 2023, Noor Bakhsh performed at major festivals including Roskilde Festival in Denmark and Le Guess Who? in the Netherlands. He has since toured across Europe and North America, appearing at the Richmond Folk Festival (2024) and other international venues.

== Repertoire and influences ==
Noor Bakhsh's repertoire includes Balochi love songs, ghazals, Bollywood-inspired melodies, and his own compositions. The title track of Jingul refers to a small bird that nested in his home. His improvisational approach involves looping short motifs that gradually evolve into complex melodic patterns, creating a meditative and hypnotic sound. He cites earlier benju masters such as Ustad Khuda Bakhsh and Ustad Misri Khan Jamali as inspirations.

== Personal life ==
Despite his international fame, Noor Bakhsh continues to live in Sindhi Paso, near Pasni, where he still performs in local community gatherings. He maintains a simple technical setup, using his battery-powered amplifier and a locally built benju.

== Legacy ==
Noor Bakhsh is considered a bridge between the folk traditions of the Makran coast and global world music. His success in later life has been cited as an example of how traditional musicians can reach international audiences without altering their cultural authenticity. He is credited with revitalizing interest in the benju and bringing Balochi instrumental music to new listeners worldwide.

== Discography ==
- Jingul (2022, Honiunhoni / Hive Mind Records)

== See also ==
- Benju
- Music of Balochistan
- Folk music of Pakistan
