= Sadiq Fakir =

Sadiq Faqir صادق فقير
- Born: March 20, 1964
- Origin: Sindhi
- Died: 26 February 2015 (aged 50) Saudi Arabia
- Genres: Folk music, Sindhi Classical music
- Occupations: Folk singer, playback singer
- Instrument: Vocals harmonium
- Formerly of: All sindhi music productions

Sadiq Fakir (Urdu: صادق فقیر) (Sindhi :صادق فقير ) born on 20 March 1964, in Diplo, Pakistan was a singer and performer of Sindhi music from Sindh, Pakistan.

== Early life ==
He belonged to the Manganhar tribe, and was born to Faqir Faiz Muhammad Manganhar. His early education was from Mithi. He received musical training from his maternal uncle Hussain Fakir. He sang at school functions and later at weddings in Thar and other parts of Sindh.

== Education ==
Sadiq Faqir received his primary education in his hometown. Later his family settled in Mithi where he got further education. He did his master's degrees in Physical education and Sindhi literature.

== Career ==
He started his career as a singer from Radio Pakistan, a section of the Pakistan Broadcasting Corporation. And then his songs telecasted from Pakistan Television Corporation. His postgraduate degree was in Sindhi literature. He also had several Sindhi music albums to his credit. He died in a road accident on 26 Feb. 2015 in Saudi Arabia while he was on his way to perform Umrah in Mecca. Sadiq Fakir was born singer and he was also considered as a folk singer. He too sang the prominent poets of Sindh like Shah Abdul Latif Bhitai, Sachal Sarmast Shaikh Ayaz and Ustad Bukhari. He performed and got appreciation in Dubai, India, Singapore, the United States, the United Kingdom, Canada and Saudi Arabia. Sadiq Fakir served as high school teacher at Government High School Mithi City. He was rewarded with Shah Abdul Latif Bhitai Award, Sachal Sarmast Award and Mai Bhagi Awards. Sadiq Fakir's two sons Nazakat Ali and Rahat Ali are good singers as well.

== Death ==
Sadiq Fakir died on 26 February 2015 in Saudi Arabia.
