= Joma Surizehi =

Joma Surizehi was an ethnic Baloch musician who played a prominent role in refining the Baloch instrument known as the benju (which was likely based on the Japanese taishogoto which arrived in South Asia in the early 20th century) and securing its place in Baloch culture.

His son is Abd-ur-Rahmân Surizehi, a Norwegian musician considered the world's greatest benju player.
