= Zeb-un-Nissa (singer) =

Pakistani singer (died 2019)

Zeb-un-Nissa Sindhi: زيب النساء
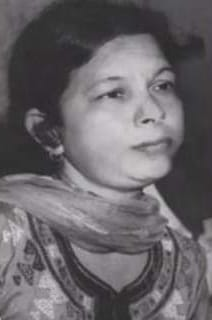

Background information
- Also known as: Zeb-un-Nissa
- Born: Qaim Khatoon; 24 September 1939; Nawabshah, Sind, British India, Pakistan
- Died: 19 December 2019 (aged 80) Nawabshah, Sindh, Pakistan
- Genres: Sindhi
- Occupation: Folk singer
- Years active: 1958 – 2010
- Children: Samina Kanwal (daughter)

Zeb-un-Nissa (Sindhi: زيب النساءُ; Death: 19 December 2019) was a Sindhi folk singer of Pakistan. She was among the leading female singers of Sindh during the period from 1960s to 1990s. She had sung hundreds of Sufi songs which were recorded by Radio Pakistan Hyderabad.

== Early life and childhood ==
Zeb-un-Nissa was born in Nawabshah Sindh in the house of Bachu Shaikh. Her real name was Qaim Khatoon. She did not belong to a typical family of singers or musicians, however, her mother used to sing in local marriage ceremonies and social gatherings.

== Singing career ==
Zeb-un-Nissa started her singing career in 1958 from Radio Pakistan Hyderabad. She took lessons of music from the renowned Sindhi singer Muhammad Juman. She had a beautiful voice. Radio Pakistan recorded numerous songs of Sufi poets in her voice. Those Sufi poets included Shah Abdul Latif Bhitai, Sachal Sarmast, Misri Shah, Manthar Faqir, Budhal Faqir and many others. A rich collection of songs sung by her are available in the music Library of Radio Pakistan. She was also popular for the marriage songs called "Sehra" or "Lada" in Sindhi. She recorded the marriage songs with renowned female singers Zarina Baloch, Amina and Rubina Qureshi. Her duets with Ustad Muhammad Juman and Ustad Muhammad Yousuf are also very popular. Pakistan Television Centre Karachi also recorded more than 50 songs in her voice along with other female singers.

== Death ==
Zeb-un-Nissa died on 19 December 2019 in Nawabshah. Among her five daughters and two sons, only one daughter Samina Kanwal is a singer.
