= Noor Bano =

Noor Bano (Urdu: نور بانو) may refer to:

- Noor Bano (politician) (born 1939), Indian politician
- Noor Bano (TV serial), from Pakistan
- Nurbanu Sultan (1525–1583), Turkish princess
- Noor Bano (singer) (1942–1999), Pakistani singer
