= Abdul Qadir Junejo =

Pakistani writer (1945–2020)

- Born: Abdul Qadir; 13 September 1945; Village Jinhan, Tharparkar, Sindh
- Died: 30 March 2020 (aged 74); Jamshoro
- Occupations: Writer, playwright
- Writing career
- Genres: Fiction, non-fiction (plays, novels)
- Subjects: Literature, philosophy, sociology
- Notable awards: Pride of Performance, Latif Award
- Website: abdulqadirjunejo.com

Abdul Qadir Junejo (Sindhi: عبد القادر جوڻيجو) (Urdu: عبد القادر جونیجو) (13 September 1945 – 30 March 2020) was a Pakistani novelist, playwright and columnist who wrote in Sindhi, Urdu and English.

== Early life ==
Junejo was born in the small village of Jinhan, Tharparkar, Sindh. His father, Mureed Hussain Junejo, was a police officer.

Junejo received his primary education in his native village. He then attended the University of Sindh where he earned a Bachelor of Arts, a Bachelor of Education and a Master of Arts in sociology.

== Career ==
In 1962, Junejo started working as a primary school teacher, becoming a secondary school teacher in 1972. He was then appointed Director at the Institute of Sindhology, Jamshoro. He remained chairman of Sindhi Language Authority from 15 September 2005 to 10 May 2008. He wrote 22 Sindhi dramas for radio and 11 Urdu dramas for television.

== Publications ==
Junejo wrote books in English and Sindhi.

- Watoon, Ratyoon Ain Rol (1973) (Sindhi: واٽون، راتيون ۽ رول)
- Shikliyoon (1979) (Sindhi: شڪليون)
- Weender Wahi Lahandar Sijj (1984) (Sindhi: ويندڙ واھي لھندڙ سج)
- Wada Adeeb Wadyoon Galhyoon (1984) (Sindhi: وڏا اديب وڏيون ڳالھيون)
- Sono Roop Sijj (1986) (Sindhi: سونو روپ سج)
- Everest te Charhai (1987) (Sindhi: ايورسٽ تي چڙھائي)
- Kursi (1998) (Sindhi: ڪرسي)
- Chho Chha Ain Keein (1999) (Sindhi: ڇو ڇا ۽ ڪيئن)
- Khat bin Adeeban Ja (1999) (Sindhi: خط ٻن اديبن جا)
- Dar Dar ja Musafir (2001) (Sindhi: در در جا مسافر)
- Wan Wan Jee Kathiee (2002) (Sindhi: وڻ وڻ جي ڪاٺي)
- The Dead River (2014) English (ISBN 9789699368091)

== Dramas and serials ==
He wrote dramas and serials that aired on Pakistan Television Corporation and commercial channels. He gained popularity in South Asia for his dramas Paranda and Dhool. He wrote six Sindhi language drama serials and 13 in Urdu language, aired on Media of Pakistan.

== Recognition ==
The Government of Pakistan and Government of Sindh awarded him Pride of Performance (2008) and Latif Award (2016), respectively. He received several awards from local organizations.

== Death ==
He died on 30 March 2020 in Jamshoro due to liver disease.
