= Dhol Faqeer =

Folk singer of Pakistan (1921-1992)

Dhol Faqeer Sindhi: ڍول فقير
- Born: Dhol Faqeer; 1 January 1917
- Origin: Sindh
- Died: 22 June 1992 (aged 75)
- Genres: Folk music of Pakistan
- Occupations: Folk singer Instrumentalist - Dhol and Ektara
- Years active: 1950 – 1992

Dhol Faqeer
- Awards: Pride of Performance award by the President of Pakistan in 1990

Dhol Faqeer (original name Dhol Faqeer) (Sindhi: ڍول فقير) (1917 – 22 June 1992) was a famous mystic and folk singer of Sindh, Pakistan. He was born at Patayoon, near Tando Allahyar, Mirpur Khas District, Sindh, British India.

He was the son of Faqeer Muhammad Khaskheli. He died on 22 June 1992.

== Education ==
Dhol Faqeer did not have much formal education and schooling due to his family's poverty.

== Musical career ==
Dhol Faqeer listened to other singers at different places and learned how to sing himself from them. Later, he took training of music from Ismail Murree, Manthaar Faqeer Rajar and his grandson Wali Baksh Rajar.

Dhol Faqeer was one of those singers who made Sindhi music durable with the combination of traditional Sindhi poetry. He considered singing as worship and charged nothing for singing. He was a disciple of scholar and poet Makhdoom Muhammad Zaman Talibul Moula who introduced him at Radio Pakistan, Karachi station around 1948. Producer Mohammad Baksh Ansari took him to Hyderabad whereas Abdul Karim Baloch introduced him on Pakistan Television, Karachi.

His songs were mainly broadcast from Radio Pakistan, Hyderabad. He visited many countries to perform his art.

== Awards ==
Along with several regional awards, the Government of Pakistan awarded him the Presidential Pride of Performance on 23 March 1990.

== Death ==
Dhol Faqeer died of kidney failure on 22 June 1992. He is buried at Tando Allahyar in Sindh, Pakistan.
