= Faiz Mohammad Baloch =

Balochi composer and performer (1901–1982)

Faiz Mohammad Baloch فیز محمد فیزوک
- Born: 1901; Qasr-e Qand, Sistan and Baluchestan, Iran
- Died: 6 May 1982 (aged 81–82) Quetta, Balochistan, Pakistan
- Genres: Folk, Balochi
- Occupations: Singer, instrumentalist
- Instruments: Lute, harp

Faiz Mohammad Faizok (1901 – 6 May 1982; Balochi: فیز محمد فیزوک), was a Balochi-language folk musician and folk singer from Pakistani.

He was well known for his unique style of body language and barefooted dancing with his songs. His contribution to Balochi music is greatly admired by most Baloch people. He introduced the traditional music style of Balochi folk songs all over Pakistan after migrating to Karachi, Pakistan.

== Early life ==
He was born into an Iranian-Baloch family in Qasr-e Qand, Iran, a region in Nikshahr township, in 1901 in the Iranian part of Balochistan, called Sistan and Baluchestan province. First his father introduced him to Baloch musical instruments and taught him to sing. Then Master Mallarami formally taught him how to sing and he learned to play the lute and the harp from the musician Allahdad. Master Allahdad belonged to the Lashar region in Nikshar township. Faiz decided to move, with his wife and children, to the newly created country Pakistan at the time of independence of Pakistan in 1947. At that time, he was already 46 years old.

In Pakistan, Master Khayr Mohammad taught him Sindhi music. Although Faiz Baloch had lived his early life in Karachi where he had initially settled in Lyari Town area of Karachi that had a significant Balochi-speaking population. Initially he worked as a labourer during the day and he would entertain the local people with his singing in the evening at street corners and at local wedding events. His singing first became popular among the Baluchi-speaking people of Karachi. In the 1950s, Faiz started to record his songs at Radio Pakistan, Karachi and continued to record his songs in the 1960s also, yet mainstream popularity still eluded him until he got a chance to perform on television.

He later moved on to Quetta, Balochistan where the establishment of the first Pakistani television station (PTV, Quetta) in 1974 compelled him to move there from Karachi. Faiz's performances included barefooted dancing while singing. So radio broadcasts of his music and singing could not capture the full potential of his performances. Most of his songs and music were upbeat. At Quetta, he then lived most of his remaining life and served the cause of Balochi folk music. He had a son named Noor Muhammad Baloch. 2022 Miss In died.

== Musical career ==
He composed poems and songs in his mother tongue, Balochi. His works consist of hundreds of songs. He toured and performed in South Korea, Soviet Union, Indonesia, France, United States, Lebanon, and Spain.

His most popular songs are:

- "Laila O' Laila" (This song's performance on television (PTV) in a 1973 show first earned him nationwide popularity)
- "Biya tara baran saila"
- "Musqat e Mehruk"
- "Bag e Bulbula"
- "Mai Zameen O' Asmaana"
- "Mai-Sharona"
- "Yeh Pakistan Hamara" (song in Urdu language)

== Awards and recognition ==
- Pride of Performance Award by the President of Pakistan in 1979.

== Death and legacy ==
He died in 1982 at Quetta, Balochistan, when he was over 80 years old. He has a son named Taj Mohammad Tajal Baloch who works as a banjo player at PTV, Quetta broadcast center. sons named.
