= Abd-ur-Rahmân Surizehi =

Iranian musician

Abdulrahman Surizehi
- Born: 1960 (age 65–66); Balochistan, Iran
- Genres: Balochi music, Folk pop, Folk music, Adult contemporary, Pop
- Occupations: musician, Composer

Abdulrahman Surizehi is an ethnic Baloch musician. Born in Iranian Balochistan, he moved to Oslo, Norway. Surizehi specialises in the benju, a Baluch keyboard zither, and has been referred to as the instrument's greatest performer. Surizehi was influenced by his father Joma Surizehi, who played a prominent role in refining the instrument and securing its place in Baloch culture.

In this work "Abdul Rahman Suri Zahi" the "banjo" player had a great contribution and aroused the admiration of everyone. He also plays the doubled-headed drum Doholak, Tanburag, Tabla and Sarod.

In the concert which performed by a Balochi melody in 2011 at Oslo, "Abdul Rahman Suri Zahi" the "benju" player had a great contribution and aroused the admiration of everyone.

== Discography ==
- 2006:Allah Hu / Morida / Simor
- 2007:Kaply Wala
- 2007:Naz
- 2011:Koshta Mana
- 2011:Mate Watan
- 2011:Delbaar
