= Latif Award =

Pakistani award for authors and literary associations

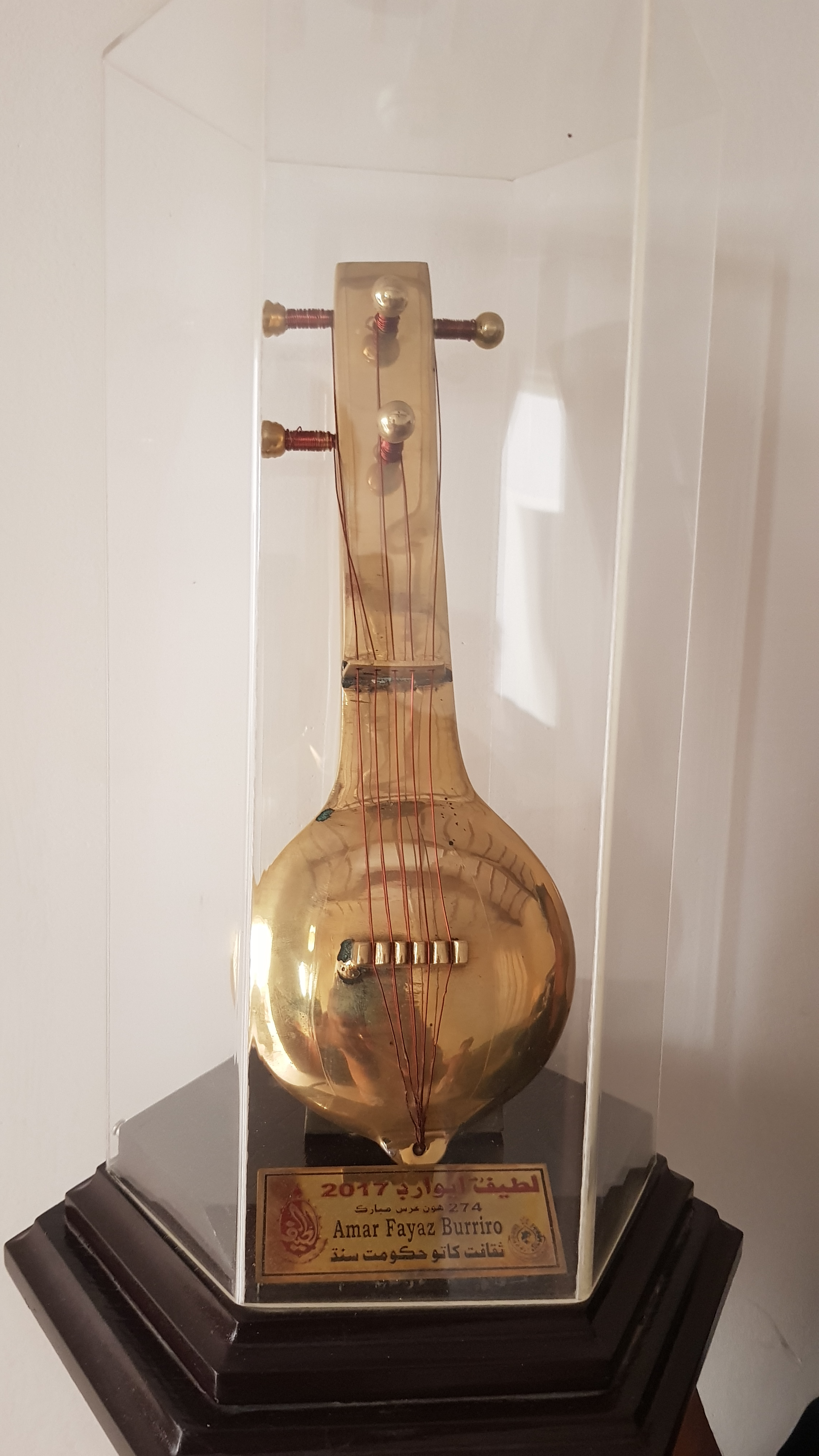
- Latif Award
- Awarded for: Best researcher, artist, Sughar, Singer of Shah Abdul Latif Bhittai
- Location: Bhit Shah, Sindh
- Country: Pakistan
- Presented by: Culture, Tourism and Antiquities Department, government of Sindh
- Website: sindhculture.gov.pk

Latif Award (Sindhi: لطيف ايوارڊ) is given by Department of Culture, Tourism and Antiquities, government of Sindh to the best researchers and singers of Shah Abdul Latif Bhittai who made extraordinary work in Arts and Research field related with mystic poetry of Shah Abdul Latif Bhittai, Sindhi language and Sindhi music. This award is a highest cultural decoration given by Government of Sindh. The award is given on Urs of Shah Abdul Latif Bhittai each year. Latif Award is a unique golden model of Tamboro, a stringed music instrument, which is said to be invented by Shah Abdul Latif Bhittai himself.

== 1998 ==
Winner Of Latif Award in (254 Urs)Held In 1998, are given below

• Sughar Abdul Rahman Mahesar ( Best Sughar)

=== 2004 ===
Winners of Latif Award in (260 Urs) held in 2004, are given below:

- Mazhar Hussain & Zulfiqar Ali (singers)
- Atta Mohammad Bhambhro (research)
- Nabi Bakhsh Khan Baloch (lifetime achievement)
- Manzoor Ali Khan (singer)
- Muhammad Juman (singer)
- Master Muhammad Ibrahim (singer)

=== 2008 ===
Winners of Latif Award in (264 Urs) held in 2008, are given below:

- Abdullah Panhwar (Latif Ragh)
- Ghulam Muhammad,(Banjo player)
- Bhano Khan Shaikh (Research)
- Allah Dino Nizamani (Shah Jo Ragi)

== 2010 ==
Winners of Latif Award in (266 Urs) held in 2010, are given below:

• Sughar Abdul Rahman Mahesar (lifetime achievement)

=== 2011 ===
Winners of Latif Award in (267 Urs) held in 2011, are given below:

- Faqeer Pir Bux Soomro (Shah's singer)
- Mohammad Hussain Kashif (posthumously, research award)
- Mohammad Hassan Mallah (instrumentalist)
- Sanam Marvi (singer)
- Waryam Faqeer (folk poetry)

=== 2015 ===
Winners of Latif Award in (272 Urs) held in 2015, are given below:

- Syed Gadda Hussain (Shah's raagi)
- Taj Mastani (artist)
- Haji Ali Nawaz (sughar)
- Nawaz Mohamamd Achar (musician)
- Abdul-Majid Bhurgri (research)

=== 2016 ===
Winners of Latif Award in (273 Urs) held in 2016, are given below:

- Ernest Trumpp (posthumously awarded)
- Mai Dhai (folk singing)
- Abdul Hameed Akhund (extra ordinary services)
- Karam Hussain (Musician)
- Ali Gul (Folk poetry)
- Madad Ali Jat (Shah's singer)
- Prof. Ghulam Mohammad Lakho (research)
- Abdul Qadir Junejo (Writer)
- Dr. Ahsan Danish (research)

=== 2017 ===
Winners of Latif Award in (274 Urs) held in 2017, are given below:

- Faqir Manthar Junejo and Allah Dino Junejo (Bhital's raagis)
- Abdul Shakoor (instrumentalist)
- Jami Chandio (researcher)
- Qasim Rahimoon (sughar)
- Yasir Qazi, (compere)
- Amar Fayaz Buriro (extra ordinary service)
- Shabir Kumbhar (extra ordinary service)
- Master Intikhab Burdi and baby Rahat Burdi (who memorized Shah's kalam)
- Nadir Ali Jamali (who produced Bhitai's statue)

=== 2018 ===
Winners of Latif Award in (275 Urs) held in 2018, are given below:

- Faqir Jawan Chhajro (Shah's singer)
- Rashid Hyderi (Artist)
- Zulfiqar Lund (Instrumentalist)
- Mamoor Yousfani (researcher posthumously)
- Dr. Sher Mahrani (research)
- Taj Mohammad (folk poetry)
- Bakhshan Mahranvi (compare)
- Eeshwar Das Mandnani
- Jameel Ahmed Rind (Special award)
- Shahid Hussain Abro (Special award)

=== 2019 ===
Winners of Latif Award in (276 Urs) held in 2018, are given below:

- Faqir Gul Muhammad Pahore (Bhittai's Raagi)
- Daato Dital Abro (Folk Poetry)
- Syed Ali Mir Shah (posthumously awarded)
- Din Muhammad Damsaz (Singer)
- Muhammad Talib Kohistani (Instrumentalist)
- Natho khan Lund (Lifetime achievement)
- Christopher Shackle (Researcher)
- Suleman Wassan & Ubaid Thaheem (Sindh Salamat Kitab Ghar)

=== 2020 ===
Winners of Latif Award in (277 Urs) held in 2018, are given below:

- Waryam Faqir Khaskheli (Bhittai's Raagi)
- Rafiq Faqeer (Singer)
- Pir Bux (Instrumentalist)
- Sarmad Chadio (posthumously awarded)
- Muhammad Soomar Shaikh (Researcher)
- Abdul Qadir Khatti (Sughar)
- Bhaledino Aka Raja Sand (Shah Jo Risalo Multilingual App)

== 2023 ==
Winners of Latif Award in (280 Urs) held in 2023, are given below:

- Sughar Khalil Rahman Mahesar (Best Sughar)
