= Pathanay Khan =

Pakistani folk singer (1926–2000)

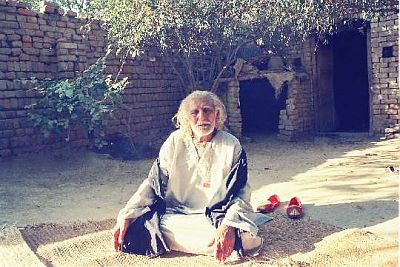
- Photograph of Pathanay Khan
- Born: Ghulam Mohammad; 1926; Basti Tambu Wali, Kot Addu, Punjab, British India
- Died: 9 March 2000 (aged 74); Kot Addu, Punjab, Pakistan
- Known for: Folk music
- Awards: Pride of Performance (1979)

Ghulam Mohammad PP, known popularly as Pathanay Khan (Note: Punjabi: پٹھاݨے خاں) (Punjabi: [pəʈʰaːɳeː xãː]; 1926 – 9 March 2000), was a Pakistani folk singer. He was associated with the folk music of Punjab and mostly sang kafis and ghazals, usually drawing on the Sufi poetry of Bulleh Shah, Khwaja Ghulam Farid, Pir Meher Ali Shah and Shah Hussain. He is regarded as a "legendary" figure of folk music.

== Early life ==
Ghulam Mohammad was born in 1926 in his ancestral village, Basti Tambu Wali, in Kot Addu, British Punjab to a Punjabi-speaking family.

Pathanay Khan was very attached to his mother. She took good care of him and tried to get him educated. However, he, like his father Khameesa Khan, spent his time wandering, contemplating and singing. His inherent nature lured him away from his high school after the seventh grade. He began singing, mostly the Kafis of Khwaja Ghulam Farid, the saint of Mithankot. His first teacher in folk singing was Baba Mir Khan, who taught him everything he knew. Singing alone did not earn him enough, so the young Pathanay Khan started collecting firewood for his mother, who used to make bread for the villagers as a village baker. This enabled the family to earn a very modest living. It is said that remembering those days brought tears to his eyes and he believed that it was his love for God, music, and Khwaja Ghulam Farid that gave him strength to bear the burden. Pathanay Khan adopted singing as a profession in earnest after his mother's death. His singing had the capacity to bewitch his listeners, and he could sing for hours on end.

=== Story behind the name ===
When he was only a few years old, Pathanay Khan's father married for a third time, upon which his mother decided to leave his father. She took her young son along and went to Kot Addu to stay with her father. When the boy fell seriously ill, his mother took him to a Syed's (a spiritual leader) house. The Syed's wife looked after him, and advised his mother to change the boy's name because it seemed 'spiritually too heavy' for him. Syed's wife's daughter commented that he looked like a Pathan, and so from that day onwards, he was known as 'Pathanay Khan'. His mother credited the new name for saving the child's life.

== Career ==
Pathanay Khan was totally devoted to Khwaja Ghulam Farid and Bulleh Shah. He gave his own deeper meaning to Khwaja's poetry through his typical style of spirited singing. For example, Khwaja Farid's kafi "Piloo pakian ni vay" has been sung by Suraiya Multanikar, Hussain Bakhsh Dhadhi and many others. Suraiya Multanikar's composition presents it as a light folk song, while Hussain Bakhsh Dhadhi presents it as a classical piece decorated by his unique 'taans' in the style of classical music singer Ashiq Ali Khan. However, Pathanay Khan's version of this kafi brings a deeper cosmic meaning to it. On the death anniversary of Pathanay Khan in 2016, folk icon Shaukat Ali recalled that Pathanay Khan gave a new dimension to folk music in Pakistan by introducing his specific style of singing kafis and 'sufiana kalaam'.

In 1976, Zulfikar Ali Bhutto, then prime minister of Pakistan, invited him to Islamabad for a private performance. When Pathanay Khan sang "Jindarri lutti tain yaar sajan, Kadi mor maharan tay wal a watan", Bhutto broke into tears. After the programme, the prime minister asked Pathanay Khan three times if he had any 'wish' to make that the Prime Minister could then fulfill. Each time the singer's reply was, "Bhutto Sahib, aap ko gharib awaam ki parat ho" (Bhutto Sahib, take care of the poor). At this, Bhutto hugged Pathanay Khan and said "I will surely take care of the poor".

== Popular hits on television ==
- "Chheena een chhaneeda yaar"
- "Meda ishq vee toon"
- "Peelu pakkian nee"
- "Jindari lutti"
- "Kia haal sunanwan dil da, koi mehram yaar na milda"
- Ghoom Charakhreya, Teri Kattan Wali Jeevay

== Albums ==
Year	Title
1984	Main Vee Jana Jhok Ranjhan
1984	Mera Ishq Vi Toon
1989	Faiz Aman Mela '89
1992	Dil Dam Dam Dardon
1992	Ranjhan Ang Lagaya
1999	Kafis

== Awards and recognition ==
- Pride of Performance Award in 1979 by the President of Pakistan.

== Death ==
Pathanay Khan died after a protracted illness at his native town of Kot Addu on Thursday 9 March 2000. His funeral was attended by a large number of people including poets, intellectuals, lawyers, educationalists and district officials. He was buried in his native graveyard in Kot Addu.

== See also ==
- Mai Bhaghi
- Attaullah Khan Esakhelvi
