= Fozia Soomro =

Fozia Soomro Sindhi: فوزيهababe سومرو

Background information
- Born: Hakeeman; 1966
- Origin: Sindh
- Died: 4 September 2002 (aged 36)
- Genres: Folk
- Occupation: Singer
- Years active: 1980–2002

Fozia Soomro (Sindhi: فوزيه سومرو) (1966–2002) was a regional folk singer from, Sindh, Pakistan.

== Early life ==
Fozia was born Hakeeman, the daughter of song vocalist Haji Nathoo Soomro. Due to lack of resources, her parents relocated to Tando Muhammad Khan in Sindh, where she started singing at an early age.

== Singing career ==
Fozia started singing discreetly at the age of sixteen because of her conservative family. She was introduced to Radio Pakistan through Naseer Mirza, who recorded two songs with her: "Be qadra qadr na kayaee ko" and "Chade wai chade wai sathi sukhan ja". Both songs were instant hits and brought her fame. She sang in Dhatki and Marwari languages. Soomro performed at parties, weddings, and other social occasions. Fozia sang in adulation of Benazir Bhutto, the former Prime Minister of Pakistan.

== Awards ==
She was awarded the Shah Latif Award.

== Death ==
On 4 September 2002, Fozia died of kidney failure. She is buried in Sakhi Burhan Shah cemetery, Tando Muhammad Khan.
