= Surando =

Musical instrument from South Asia

The Surando is an ancient traditional Sindhi musical instrument. It is played by musicians in Sindh, Kutch, Rajasthan, and Balochistan. The term "Surando" is derived from the Persian word "Surayindah," meaning "producer of tunes."

== In the literature ==
In the Sindhi folktale Sorath Rai Diyach, by Shah Abdul Latif Bhittai, Bijal is a charan who plays the Surando. The king, Rai Diyach, is so impressed by the music that he agrees to Bijal's request for his head as a sacrifice in honour of the Surando music.
