= Muhammad Yousuf (playback singer) =

Pakistani folk and playback singer (1940–1997)

Ustad Muhammad Yousuf محمد يوسف PP
- Born: January 20, 1940; Hyderabad, Sindh, Pakistan
- Died: February 14, 1997 (aged 57)
- Genres: Kafi, Ghazal, Filmi Lyrics
- Occupations: Folk Singer; Playback Singer; music composer
- Years active: (1950-1997)
- Awards: Pride of Performance; Latif Award; Sachal Award; Qalendar Shahbaz Award

Muhammad Yousuf (Sindhi: استاد محمد يوسف; January 20, 1940 – February 14, 1997) was a folk and playback singer of Pakistan.

== Childhood ==
Muhammad Yousuf was born in Muhalla Din Ali Shah, Tiyoon Number Talau, Tando Tayeb Hyderabad, Sindh, Pakistan. His father Laung Faqir Maganhar was a Dholak Nawaz (drum beater) and Sharnai (or Shahnai) player. His father used to play Dholak at Radio Pakistan Hyderabad. Yousuf attended Baar Sudhar School and Haji Seth Kamaluddin School Hyderabad. However, he was not interested in formal education and left school after passing five classes. He joined the musical club of Bibo Khan. Afterwards, his father sent him to noted singer Manzoor Ali Khan at Tando Adam Khan. He studied with him for about thirteen years.

In 1951, a competition for new singers was organized at Liaquat Medical College (Now Liaquat University of Medical and Health Sciences) Jamshoro. The Provincial Minister Ali Muhammad Rashidi was the chief guest of the event. Muhammad Yousuf got first position at the competition, along with much appreciation and encouragement. Then, he started singing at Radio Pakistan Karachi. After the establishment of Radio Pakistan Hyderabad in 1955, he shifted from Karachi to his home town Hyderabad.

== Singing career ==
After early success at Radio Pakistan, he started singing in Sindhi films as a playback singer. His first film as a playback singer was Shehro Feroz which was released on 18 October 1968 from Karachi. This film was directed by Shaikh Hassan and its music composer was Ghulam Ali. His first play back lyric "Rahat Milay Thi Dard Men, Man Piyar Tan Sadqay" made him very popular in film industry. He continued as a playback singer in almost all Sindhi films released in the 1970s and 1980s. As a playback singer, he sang with many famous singers such as Madam Noor Jahan, Abida Parveen, Runa laila and others.

He sang the poetry of Shah Abdul Latif, Sachal Sarmast, Misri Shah and other Sufi poets of Sindh. He also performed in England, Germany, Belgium, Russia and China. Muhammad Yousuf not only sang in Sindhi but also in Seraiki and Urdu languages.

== Honors and awards ==
Muhammad Yousuf received two Pride of Performance awards, four Shah Latif Awards, Four Qalendar Shahaz Awards and three Sachal Awards.
