= Noor Bano (singer) =

Noor Bano نور بانو
- Born: Noor Bano Gopang; 1942; Village Mithu Gopng, District Badin, Sindh
- Died: 14 February 1999 (aged 56–57) Talhar, District Badin.
- Genres: Sindhi
- Occupation: Folk singer
- Years active: 1970–1990

Noor Bano (1942 – 14 February 1999) was a folk singer of Sindh, Pakistan. She was popular in Sindh, particularly in rural Sindh.

== Biography ==
Noor Bano was born in 1942 in Village Mithoo Gopang near Peero Lashari District Badin Sindh. Later, she moved to Talhar Sindh. Her father's name was Suleman Gopang who was a poor farmer. She did not attend any school and used to sing marriage songs in nearby villages. She got musical training from Hayat Gopang and Ustad Mithoo Kachhi.

Renowned scholars Pir Ali Muhammad Shah Rashidi and Pir Hassamuddin Shah Rashidi had love for music and culture of Sindh. They visited the residence of Syed Wadal Shah Rashidi in Talhar. Syed Wadal Shah arranged a musical program in their honour. Noor Bano was called to sing in that program. The guests were very impressed by her natural sweet voice and advised her to sing at Radio Pakistan Hyderabad. Pir Zaman Shah Rashidi, the son of Syed Wadal Shah introduced her at Radio Pakistan in the late 1960s. Her first song at Radio Pakistan was "Munhnjay Marooaran joon boliyoon sujanan" (منهنجي ماروئڙن جون ٻوليون سڃاڻان). Her other hit song was "Munhinjay Mithran Marun Tay Ala Kakar Chhanwa Kajan".

On Radio Pakistan, she sang most of the songs as a solo singer, however, she also sang with famous singers Master Muhammad Ibrahim, Mithoo Kachhi, Zarina Baloch and Amina. She was also popular for her Sindhi marriage songs called "Lada" or Sahera". Some of her songs are available in music library of Radio Pakistan Hyderabad.

She died on 14 February 1999 in Talhar and was buried in Hyder Shah Lakyari graveyard.
