= Shazia Khushk =

Shazia Khushk شازیہ خشک
- Born: Shazia Khushk; September 1970 (age 55) jamshoro, Sindh, Pakistan
- Genres: Folk
- Occupation: Singer

Shazia Khushk (Urdu: شازیہ خشک, Sindhi: شازيه خشڪ) (born September 1970 in Jamshoro), is a Pakistani former folk singer. She sang in Sindhi, Balochi, Sairaiki, Urdu, Kashmiri, Brahui and Punjabi.

== Biography ==
Shazia Khushk was born at Jamshoro. She debuted for a show in 1992, upon her husband's encouragement, about whom Shazia says, "My husband often called me the Queen of Voice". She emerged as a singer of two prominent languages Sindhi and Balochi. Her debut song Mara Udheta Pakhiyara Kadi Aao Na Maare Des popularized her name across the country.

== Legacy ==
Shazia Khushk performed over 500 songs in the span of her career, performing in 45 countries around the world. US Consulate General, Karachi had selected Shazia as the 'Goodwill Ambassador'. Sindh University, Jamshoro conferred upon her, an honorary fellowship for 'Sufism - folk music'. She received the 'Presidential Award' from the government of Uzbekistan

== Awards ==
- Shazia Khushk received an honorary fellowship in Sufism and folk music from the University of Sindh.
- Uzbekistan government awarded her a Presidential Award in appreciation of her singing.

== Quit Singing ==
In 2019, Shahzia Khushk announced that she has decided to part ways with the music industry. And she will spend her rest of the life in the service of Islam.

== Songs ==
Some of her famous songs are:

- Roobaro-e-Yaar
- Tera Naam Liya
- Laal Meri Pat Rakhyo لعل میری پت رکھیو
- Niaani Nimaani
- Medha Ranjana میڈھا رانجھنا
- Mada udtha Pakhiya ke Ao Na Mare Desh
- Aley Muhinja Maaraora

https://lyricskaashi.blogspot.com/

== See also ==
- Sindhi music
- List of Sindhi singers
