= Manzoor Sakhirani =

Ustad Manzoor Sakhirani
- Born: Manzoor Ali; 14 April 1959; Dadu, Sindh, Pakistan
- Other name: Ustad
- Occupations: Singer; songwriter; musician; music director
- Years active: 1980–present
- Musical career
- Origin: Sindhi
- Genres: Film music, Sindhi music
- Instrument: Vocals harmonium percussions

Manzoor Sakhiran (Sindhi: منظور سخيراڻي) (Urdu:منظور سخیرانی), known as Ustad Manzoor Sakhirani, is a Sindhi singer from Dadu, in Sindh, Pakistan. He became a professional singer in 1980.

He performs folk songs and patriotic regional songs; often at literary gatherings. He released his first album, Band Darwazo Ta, in 1980, followed by more than 30 others. His work is supplemented via a second singer, Shaman Mirali, who attained prominence in 1990; his music remains notable for his Sindhi identity.

== Early life ==
Manzoor Sakhirani was born to Bahar ud Din on 14 April 1959 at Dadu city. His father was employed in the Revenue Department. His father wanted him to become an engineer. But Sakhirani developed keen interest in singing in childhood. He got his primary and intermediate level education from Dadu and later attended a university for engineering, where he turned to singing. Manzoor Sakhirani studied classical music under Ustad Qudrat Ullah.
