= Gobind Malhi =

Sindhi language writer

- Born: August 5, 1921; Tharu Shah, Sind, British India
- Died: February 10, 2001 (aged 79); Mumbai, India
- Citizenship: British India till 1947 Indian 1947-2001
- Education: D. J. Sindh Government Science College
- Occupations: Indian communist; short story person; novelist; freedom fighter
- Writing career
- Language: Sindhi

Gobind Malhi (5 August 1921-10 February 2001) was a Sindhi fictionist, essayist and a dramatist-director. He is credited with having revived Sindhi theatre in India. His extensive body of work comprises twenty-four novels, forty-one plays, forty short stories, and numerous articles covering a wide range of subjects. He has also directed over fifty productions.

== Biography ==
=== Early years ===
Malhi was born in 1921, in Nawabshah District in a small village Tharushah, in a Hindu Zamindar family. From a young age, Malhi showed defiance against societal norms and a keen interest in music and nature. Personal circumstances significantly influenced Malhi's formative years. He lost his mother when he was just sixteen months old. He was also compelled into matrimony while still a student in Karachi due to societal pressure and familial norms. Despite these challenges, his education in Karachi provided him exposure to broader ideas and experiences.

Inspired by his father's extensive book collection, Malhi began writing poetry at 14. As an adult, he actively participated in the Indian National Independence Movement, causing a rift with his traditionalist father. Despite his father's objections, Malhi joined the 1942 'Quit India Movement' and faced imprisonment for violating colonial laws.

=== Writing Career ===
In Karachi, Malhi gained recognition in literary circles, hosting gatherings attended by prominent writers of his time. He founded and edited the magazine Nia Duniya, promoting progressive Sindhi thought.

After the partition of India, Malhi relocated to Mumbai. His work includes over two dozen novels, three dozen short plays, and over thirty-five short stories, earning him numerous awards. Malhi's translations of literature from other languages enriched Sindhi literature, while his own works have been translated into multiple languages.

Malhi also made significant contributions to Sindhi culture through his work in drama, film, and music. His efforts to unite Sindhi writers under a shared platform further solidified his legacy within the Sindhi cultural and literary community.

== Books ==
- Sindhi Kahani Chayanika, Pakhira Valar Khan Vichuria
- Inqalabi Sipahi
- Aansun, Sargam Sahitya
- Zindagi Ji Rah Te, novel
- Sharam Booti, Sathi Sahitya
- Jeevan Sathi, novel
