= Benju =

Class of stringed musical instruments

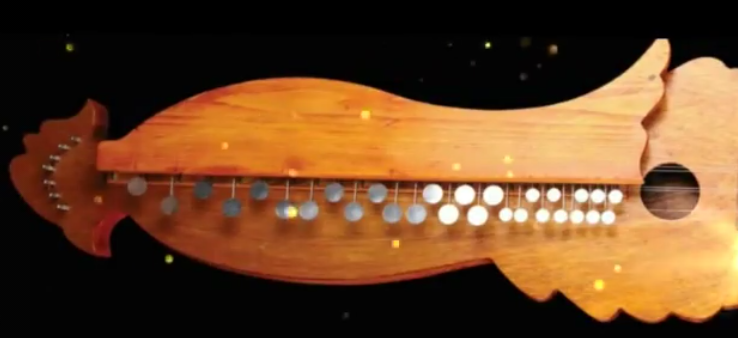
- Benju

String instrument
- Classification: (Chordophone), String instrument
- Developed: Balochistan

Related instruments
- Bar zither, musical bow, stick zither, tube zither, raft zither, board zither, box zither, harp zither, trough zither, frame zither

A Benju, Benjo (Sindhi, Balochi: بینجو) is a type of zither fitted with a keyboard, commonly used in the Sindhi music and Balochi music.

The Benju holds a significant place in the Sindh and Balochistan's musical heritage. It produces a rich overtone and creating a mesmerising sound that has become an integral part of the folk music in Balochistan.

Baloch musicians gradually adapted it for contemporary performances and developed and enchanting textural template.

Today, in all regions of Balochistan, especially in the cities, benju is used in all kinds of music along with common Balochi instruments.

== Construction and play ==
It is about 1 meter long, 10 –12 cm wide and the soundbox is about 5 cm high, with six strings. Strings 1 and 2, 5 and 6 are used as bordun (drone) strings and tuned to the tonic and the fifth or fourth. In relative pitch C and G or F. The middle strings 3 and 4 are tuned unison to F or G, and they are fretted and can be shortened by pressing down the metal keys. The scale is chromatic from G to A, B flat or B. The right hand plays the strings by using a wooden or plastic plectron, the left hand is fingering the keys.

The benju is played mainly as a solo instrument accompanied by dholak and tambura. Sometimes it is combined with Suroz.

== Players ==
- Abd-ur-Rahmân Surizehi, born in Iranian Balochistan, has been referred to as the instrument's greatest performer. He now lives in Norway.
- Bilawal Belgium, Benjo player from Mirpur khas, Sindh.
- Ustad Noor Bakhsh, born in Pakistani Balochistan, has played the benju since the age of 12. Although he spent most of his career playing at weddings and other small gatherings, his work has found an international audience late in his life. An album, Jingul, was released in 2022. He appeared on the first Boiler Room show in Karachi on June 20, 2022. In 2023 embarked on a 10-country European tour, including a performance at the Roskilde Festival.
