= Sarmad Sindhi =

Sarmad Sindhi عبدالرحمن مغل
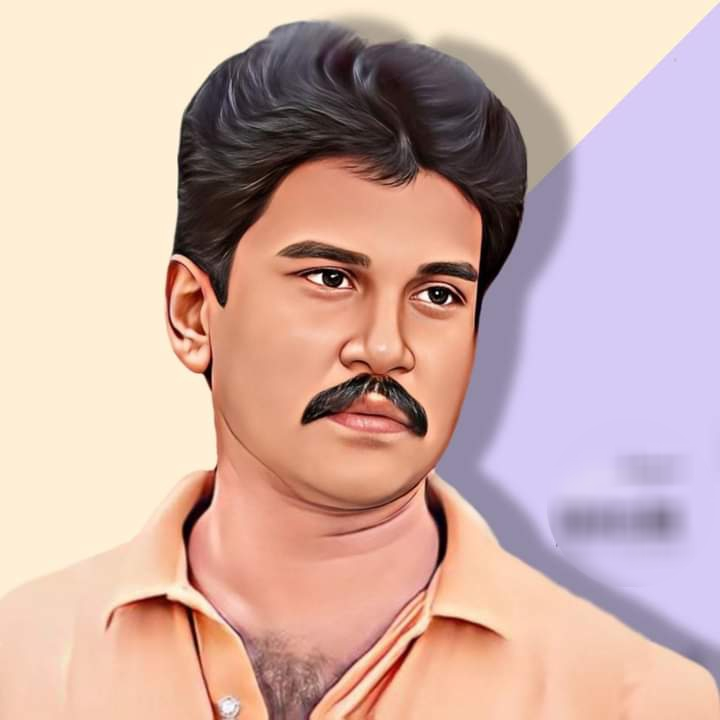
- early photo of Sarmad Sindhi

Background information
- Born: Abdul Rehman Mughal عبدالرحمن مغل; 7 July 1961; Piryaloi Khairpur District, Sindh, Pakistan
- Died: 27 December 1996 (aged 35)
- Genre: Sindhi Folk Music
- Occupations: Folk singer, Playback singer
- Instruments: Vocals, Harmonium, Percussions
- Years active: 1978–1996
- Labels: TP (Thar Production), NP (Nar Production)

Abdul Rehman Mughul, popularly known as Sarmad Sindhi (Sindhi: سرمد سنڌي)(7 July 1961 – 27 December 1996), was a Sindhi folk singer and songwriter in Pakistan. He used Sindhi language and is considered one of the great singers of the golden era of Sindhi literature and music. He sang all kinds of folk songs including his very popular song "Tuhiji yaad Ji wari aa weer", and another popular song still listened to all over Sindh "Piyar Manjharan Pengho Loday Loli Diyan", which became an anthem of his generation.

== Singing career ==
Sarmad Sindhi's lyrics focused on the problems faced by the people living in the province such as ‘"Sindh uchi aa, Sindhi uchi aa"’ (Sindh is great).

Maroo loli and Tuhinji Yaad ji wari aa weer were his first songs which were aired from Radio Pakistan, Hyderabad. Some of his songs are in Saraiki language as well.

== Death and legacy ==
Sarmad Sindhi was returning from Badin to Karachi, when his vehicle collided with a truck trolley in which he along with his friends were badly injured. While he was being taken to a hospital, he died on the way on 27 December 1996.

Sindhi Adabi Sangat (Sindhi Writers' Association) held an event on his death anniversary in 2017 at a local town Piryaloi, Khairpur District to pay tributes to him where many literary figures including poet Sajjad Mirani, Roshan Shaikh and Saeed Sindhi addressed this event. On this occasion, speakers mentioned his social work in the local community besides being a singer where he was also known as a social worker who supported a number of needy families and children's education.
