= Tufail Niazi =

Folk singer (1916–1990)

- Born: 1916; Village Mander Jalandhar, Punjab, British India
- Died: 21 September 1990 (aged 73–74); Islamabad, Pakistan
- Occupation: Folk singer
- Known for: His sweet and husky voice with a wide range
- Notable credit(s): Radio Pakistan and Pakistani television artist
- Awards: Pride of Performance Award by the President of Pakistan in 1982

Tufail Niazi (Punjabi, Urdu: طفیل نیازی) (1916 – 21 September 1990) was a Pakistani, Pujabi folk singer whose well-known songs include "Saada Chirryan Da Chamba Ae," "Akhiyaan Lagiyaan Jawaab Na Daindian," "Layee Beqadran Naal Yaari, Tay Tut Gai Tarak Karkey" and "Mein Nai Jana Kheriyan De Naal." He used to perform regularly on Pakistan Television (PTV) and Radio Pakistan.

== Early life ==
Tufail Niazi was born in 1916 at the village Mander in Jalandhar District, Punjab, British India. He was not a Pashtun of the Niazi tribe by ethnicity; Aslam Azhar, then PTV's senior producer and managing director, gave him the name Tufail Niazi because Tufail had told him that his "pir" (spiritual leader) was Pir Niaz Ali Shah.

He was a disciple of Mian Wali Muhammad of Kapurthala and Pandit Amar Nath of Batala. He also trained with his father Haji Rahim Baksh in Goindwal.

He used to sing at Harballah Festival in his childhood. Tufail Niazi migrated to Pakistan after the Partition of India in 1947. He ran a milk shop to make ends meet until he got a career break at Radio Pakistan.

Initially, he used to co-sung with his brother Qurban Niazi, but due to the competition in folk music Qurban switched to na'at and other forms of Islamic music, where he attained some name and was awarded the Sitara-i-Imtiaz by the Government of Pakistan.

== Music career ==
After the introduction of TV in Pakistan in 1964, he often appeared on the national television as a performer. Soon afterwards, his popularity soared as a folk singer in Pakistan.

Before this, Tufail had been known simply as Tufail, Master Tufail, Mian Tufail or Tufail Multani. Later, under Uxi Mufti, he worked tirelessly to help set up and sustain the National Institute of Folk and Traditional Heritage (Lok Virsa) in Islamabad, Pakistan. He travelled all over Pakistan to gather folk treasures.

== Awards and recognition ==
In recognition of his work, Tufail Niazi received the Presidential Pride of Performance Award in 1982.

== Death and legacy ==
Tufail Niazi died on 21 September 1990 at Islamabad, Pakistan. His two sons Javed and Babar Niazi have taken on their father's legacy and perform regularly on Pakistan Television, in the same manner their father did. Folk singer Tufail Niazi was paid rich tributes at a musical evening that was organised in his honour at the Pakistan National Council of the Arts (PNCA) on 30 May 2011.

== Musical style ==
Tufail Niazi was a folk musician deeply influenced by classical forms. His mastery of classical vocals, combined with a soulful melodic voice mesmerised audiences. The profound Punjabi Sufi elements in his storytelling, which was characteristic of his repertoire, together with his energetic singing while clothed in a Punjabi 'Lacha' and a silk 'Kurta', created the impression of a performer for whom art was inseparable from life. His singing was often intensely moving, as when he sang about the lives of Punjabi epic lovers, most notably Heer Ranjha, richly evoking their anguish against the setting of a Punjabi rural social environment. Work of Tufail Niazi has been recreated in various TV music programmes and movies, both in Pakistan and India. In 1998, Tufail's song "Laai beqadaran naal yaari" was recreated in Indian movie Wajood as "Tut gai tarak kar ke" by Anu Malik, although his name remained uncredited. In 2006, Pakistani movie Majajan featured Tufail's "Ve tu naire naire wass ve" performed by Azra Jahan.

In 2013, Asad Abbas paid tribute to Tufail Niazi by performing "Kade aa ve mahi gal lag ve", in Coke Studio Season 6 produced by Rohail Hayat. In 2014, when Strings band opened their first season of Coke Studio (season 7) as producers, they remade "Lai Beqadaraan Naal Yaari", performed by Tufail's sons as a tribute to the legend. The same year, "Kheryaan De Naal" was also remade and performed by Tufail's sons (Niazi Brothers).

== See also ==
- Mai Bhaghi
- Madam Noor Jahan
- Abida Parveen
- Alam Lohar
