= Bhagwanti Navani =

Indian singer

- Born: 1 February 1940; Naserpur, Sind Province, British India
- Died: 22 October 1986 (aged 46); India
- Other names: Sindhi Koil (Sindhi Cuckoo)
- Occupations: Playback singer, folk singer, actress
- Years active: 1960–1980

Bhagwanti Navani (1 February 1940 – 22 October 1986) was an Indian singer and actress known for her work in Sindhi-language music and films. She was a folk as well as playback singer. Due to her melodious and sweet voice, she was popularly known as "Sindhi Koel" (Sindhi cuckoo). Her marriage songs, called "Laada" are popular in India and Pakistan. She appeared as the heroine in the film Sindhua Jay Kinaray and performed as a playback singer in eight films.

== Biography ==
Bhagwanti was born on 1 February 1940 in Karachi, Sindh, British India (now in Pakistan). Her parents were from Naserpur, a historic town of Sindh. Her father's name was Jassu Mal Navani and mother's name was Vishni Bai. She had three brothers and two sisters. She was only seven years old when Pakistan was created and she had to migrate to Bombay, India (now Mumbai) with her parents. At the time of migration, she was studying in the Indian Girls Primary School Karachi. In Mumbai, she studied at Kamala Girls' High School and then at the High School for Sindhis. She passed her matriculation examination in 1957.

She received formal music education at the Devghar Music School, Arun Sangeet Vidyala. Afterwards, she joined the People Theater Association where her musical talent flourished under the guidance of Kanu Ghosh and Kanu Ray. She was acknowledged as an exponent of Sindhi folk music such as Bhajans, Dohiras, Kalams, Orans, Lorries, Ladas, Sakhiyoon and Sahras, etc. She sang duets with Mahendra Kapoor, C. H. Atma, and other stalwarts of her time, along with singing for the Hindi film industry.

She was one of the most popular playback singers in Sindhi movies of the 1960s and 1970s. Those films included Jhulelal, Ladli, Sindhua Je Kinare, Shal Dhiar Na Jaman, Hojamalo, Kanwar Ram, Halu Ta Bhaji Haloon, and Pardesi Preetam.

Bhagwanti was also a versatile actress. She was part of the Kalakar Mandel established by the prominent Sindhi language writer Gobind Malhi. She gave more than 3,000 stage performances in India and abroad. Her most popular plays were Mehman, Gustakhi Maaf, Tuhinjo so Muhinjo and Desh Ji Lalkar. She was Heroine in the famous 1968 Sindhi film Sindhua Je Kinare (On the Bank of the River Indus).

== Death ==
She died on 22 October 1986. In her memory, "Bhagwanti Navani Charitable Trust" was formed on 3 October 1987.
