= Mai Bhagi =

Sindhi folk singer (1920-1986)

- مائي ڀاڳي
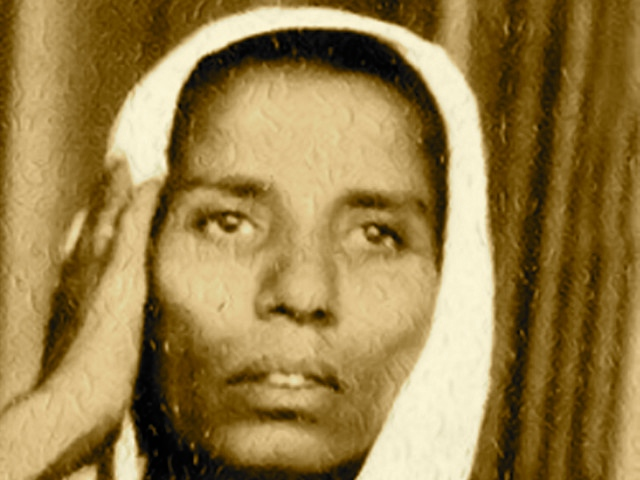
- Mai Bhagi in the 1970s
- Born: Bhagbhari c. 1920 near Diplo, Sindh, in Mithi, British Raj, now Tharparkar District, Sindh, Pakistan
- Died: 7 July 1986 (aged 65–66); Tharparkar District, Sindh, Pakistan
- Occupation: Folk Singer
- Years active: 1958 - 1986
- Awards: Pride of Performance Award by the President of Pakistan (1981)

Mai Bhagi (Sindhi:مائي ڀاڳي) (c. 1920 – 7 July 1986) was a Sindhi folk singer and musician.

== Early life and career ==
Born Bhag Bhari (meaning 'a female of good fortune') in Mithi in Thar, Sindh in 1920, Mai Bhagi grew up in a village in the Thar Desert. Her father was Wanhyun Fakir and her mother was Khadija Maganhar. Both her parents were known singers in their region at the time.

Mai Bhagi was married to folk singer Hothi Fakir at the age of 16 in Islamkot, Tharparkar. Then she shifted to Mithi Tharparkar in 1950 permanently. Record producer Sheikh Ghulam Hussain, husband of Pakistani folk singer Abida Parveen, offered her the opportunity to record at the Radio Pakistan studios, and later her records were played on the radio. She started singing on Radio Pakistan, Hyderabad her folk song 'Kharee neem kay neeche' (underneath a neem tree) from 1960. Bhagi was paid only 20 rupees for this first radio broadcast. According to a major newspaper of Pakistan, "But it wasn't until she sang it on the state-owned PTV in 1974 that the song became a national mainstream hit and turned Bhagi into a Sindhi/Dhatki folk star".

Her other folk songs 'Saman Sai Maan Ta Goli Ghulam Tohinji Dar Ji' became very popular among the Pakistani people and secured her stardom, her folk song 'Murli Wari Man Mohiyo also became popular in the rural areas of Sindh. The government of Pakistan provided financial support for her to tour overseas, and she continued her career in music until her death on 7 July 1986.

You can read complete documentary of Mai Bhagi on popular Sindhi music website 'Media Music Mania'. Further Complete detailed Biography and selected best songs of Mai Bhagi listen on.

== Awards and recognition ==
- Pride of Performance Award by the President of Pakistan in 1981.
- Shah Abdul Latif Bhittai Award
- Sachal Sarmast Award

== See also ==
- Pathanay Khan
- Tufail Niazi
- Muhammad Juman
- Reshma
- Suraiya Multanikar
