= Suhrab Faqir =

Pakistani Sufi-singer

- Born: 1936; Khairpur, Sindh, Pakistan
- Died: 23 October 2009 (aged 74–75); Talpur Wada, near Thari Mirwah, Khairpur District, Sindh, Pakistan
- Occupation: Folk singer
- Known for: Folk music, Sufi music
- Awards: Pride of Performance Award by the President of Pakistan in 1999; Shah Abdul Latif Bhittai Award; Sachal Sarmast Award

Sohrab Fakir Manganhar, also known as King of Sindhi Sufi Music, (Sindhi: سُهراب فقير صوفي, 1934 – 23 October 2009) was a Sufi singer from Sindh, Pakistan. He was awarded the Pride of Performance by the President of Pakistan in 1999.

== Early life ==
He was born in 1936 in Talpur Wada village of Kot Diji town, in Khairpur District. His father, Hammal Faqir, was an expert of the sarangi and tabla. Sohrab Faqir was king of Sufi music in Sindh and was considered one of the greatest mystic singers of Pakistan.

Sohrab Faqir was born in a family of musicians which had migrated from Jaisalmer State of Rajasthan, British India.

== Career ==
Sohrab Faqir started learning tabla from Ustad Khursheed Ali Khan and his singing career started in 1974, when he was asked by Ustad Manzoor Ali Khan to sing at the Urs celebration of Sakhi Allahyar near Tando Mohammad Khan. He was introduced to the radio at Radio Pakistan Khairpur by the renowned Sindhi writer Tanveer Abbasi, where he recorded two songs of Ghamdal Faqir including the song, Galyan Prem Nagar Diyan which became very popular throughout Sindh.

In the early 1980s, he formed a Sufi music group, Sung and became a disciple of Faqir Dur Mohammad Heesbani.

He had toured Britain, Germany, Belgium, Netherlands, Norway and France where his artful singing was highly appreciated. He also sang with other singers, such as Jamal Faqir.

== Popular songs ==
- Ghund Khol Deedar Karao, Mein Aaya Mukh Waikhan
- Galyan Prem Nagar Diyan

== Awards and recognition ==
- Shah Abdul Latif Bhittai Award
- Sachal Sarmast Award
- Pride of Performance Award by the President of Pakistan in 1999

== Death ==
Suhrab Faqir died of kidney disease on 23 October 2009 at Talpur Wada near Kot Diji. He had been ill for a long time. Earlier in August 2006, he was also hospitalized due to chest pain and diabetic complications.
