= Sanam Marvi =

Pakistani Folk and Sufi Singer

Sanam Marvi صنم ماروی Latif Award
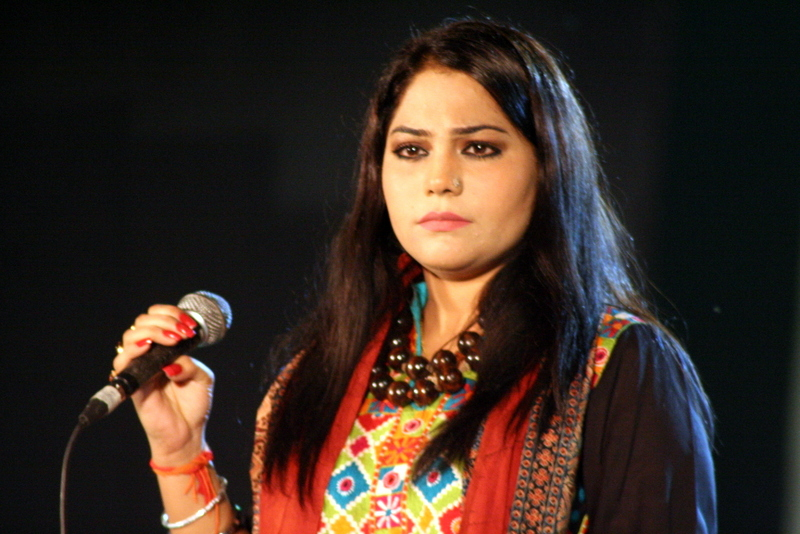

Background information
- Born: Sanam Marvi صنم ماروي; 17 April 1986 (age 40)
- Origin: Hyderabad, Sindh, Pakistan
- Genres: Sufi, folk music
- Occupations: Singer
- Instruments: Vocals
- Years active: 2009 – present
- Labels: Sagarika; Coke Studio (Pakistan); Virsa Heritage Revived on PTV; Pakistan Television Corporation
- Honors: Tamgha-i-Imtiaz (Medal of Distinction) Award by the President of Pakistan in 2020

Sanam Marvi (Sindhi: صنم ماروی) (born : 17 April 1986) is a Pakistani folk and sufi singer. She sings in Sindhi, Punjabi, and Balochi languages.

== Early life and career ==
Sanam Marvi's childhood was full of hardships and poverty. Marvi started music training at the age of 7. She is from a Sindhi Family. Her father, Faqeer Khan Muhammad, was also a Sindhi folk musician/harmonium player who gave Marvi classical music training for 2 years. Later she learnt classical singing and raags from Nusrat Fateh Ali Khan from Sindh in the Gwalior gharana tradition. She says that she has also learned a lot from folk singer Abida Parveen. She performed in Rafi Peer Theatre in 2004 and 2005.

Sanam Marvi debuted, in 2009, at ‘Virsa Heritage’, a music program on Pakistan Television Corporation channel hosted by Yousuf Salahuddin. She affectionately calls him 'like a baba to her' (a father figure to her) for giving her a big break in the Pakistani entertainment industry. Later she performed at Coke Studio Pakistan, a Pakistani television series featuring live music performances.

Marvi performs sufi concerts around the world. She is considered among the 3 of the finest performers in the Sufi, ghazal and folk genres. The other 2 being Abida Parveen and Tina Sani.

She made her debut in a solo performance on the Indian soil at 2010's Jahan-e-Khusrau, the Sufi music festival arranged by the famous film producer Muzaffar Ali of 1981 film Umrao Jaan fame. In February 2011, she performed with Indian playback singer Rekha Bhardwaj at Times of India's Aman ki Asha event at Chowmahalla Palace, Hyderabad, India.

Marvi made her live concert singing debut in 2012 with concerts held at London, Paris, New York, singing alongside Hadiqa Kiyani and Ali Zafar.

She sang the OST for A-Plus Entertainment's Piya Bedardi and Urdu1's Bachay Baraye Farokht.

Sanam Marvi feels that lyrics written by the Sufi poets have a universal and timeless appeal among the public and that people find comfort in those words.

Recently, she carried on the legacy of folk genre and sang 'Hairaan Hua' from the platform of Coke Studio.

== Personal life ==
Sanam Marvi is currently happily married with her 3rd Husband, Muhammad Khubaib Nawaz who originally belongs to the city of Khushab. They have a son named Muhammad Qaim Din, who was born on 1 December 2023. Prior to this marital commitment, Sanam Marvi was married to Hamid Ali with whom she had three children.The couple divorced in 2020 due to the differences between the couple. While her first husband, Aftab Ahmed Pharero, also known as Aftab Ahmed Kalhoro, was murdered in Karachi in 2009. They had married in 2006 but had been estranged for two years prior to his death. Marvi was Aftab's second wife.

== Awards ==
- Won UNESCO Award at 9th International Music Festival (Festival Sharq Taronalari, Samarqand 2013). She is the second artist after Nusrat Fateh Ali Khan to win this award.
- Tamgha-i-Imtiaz (Medal of Distinction) Award by the President of Pakistan in 2020
- Latif Award (2011)
- Best Singer – Sufism University
- Best Singer Light Music – Virsa at 17th PTV National Awards held in 2012
