= Master Muhammad Ibrahim =

Pakistani singer (1920–1977)

Master Muhammad Ibrahim Sindhi: استاد محمد ابراهيم
- Born: Muhammad Ibrahim; 13 June 1920
- Died: 3 May 1977 (aged 56) Karachi, Sindh
- Genres: Sindhi
- Occupation: Classical singer
- Years active: 1950–1970

Master Muhammad Ibrahim (Sindhi: استاد محمد ابراهيم) was a Sindhi-language classical singer from Pakistan.

== Early life and career ==
Muhammad Ibrahim was born on 13 June 1920 in Siliya village in the Kutch district of Gujarat, British India. He migrated to Karachi from a village near Siliya in 1942 at the age of 21.

He joined Radio Pakistan Karachi in 1948. In 1955, he moved to Radio Pakistan's Hyderabad station as a music composer.

It is said that Ustad Manzoor Ali Khan, Ustad Muhammad Juman and Master Muhammad Ibrahim revolutionized Sindhi music in the early days after the independence of Pakistan in 1947 by setting new trends and styles.

In 2016, on his 39th death anniversary, an event was arranged at the Arts Council of Pakistan in Karachi to pay tributes to him. His son claimed at this event that Master Muhammad Ibrahim was one of the singers that sang the first national anthem ever recorded in Pakistan.

== Awards and recognition ==
He was posthumously awarded the Shah Latif Award in 2007.
