= Muhammad Juman =

Sindhi folk singer (1935 – 1990)

Ustad Mohammad Juman
- استاد محمد جمن
- Born: 10 October 1935; Sorra, Balochistan, British India
- Died: 24 January 1990 (aged 54); Karachi, Sindh, Pakistan
- Occupations: Musician, folk singer
- Years active: 1950s – 1990
- Known for: Classical music, Kafi, Ghazal
- Awards: Pride of Performance Award by the President of Pakistan in 1980

Ustad Muhammad Juman (Sindhi: استاد محمد جمن) (10 October 1935 – 24 January 1990) was a Sindhi musician and classical singer from Pakistan, whose impact on Sindhi music is still pervasive.

== Early life and career ==
Muhammad Juman was born on 10 October 1935 in the village of Sorra, located in the Lasbela District of Balochistan, to a musician, Haji Ahmed Sakhirani of Sakhirani clan. It was only natural that he became fond of music from his childhood years. Juman took formal music lessons from a venerable Pakistani musician Ustad Nazar Hussain of Pakistan Television (Lahore Center), who had also been a music tutor to the renowned singer Noor Jehan.

He went to Radio Pakistan in Karachi to start a career as a Surando player (fiddler). He played symphony of Kohyari in audition and started working as a staff musician for Radio Pakistan, Karachi. He played the Surando in harmony with many artists, especially Ustad Muhammad Ibrahim.

In 1955, he went to Radio Pakistan Hyderabad as a musician where he composed Kalams of various Sufi saints of Sindh.

== Flute playing ==
He had been fond of playing flute since childhood. Therefore he visited Radio Pakistan Karachi station several times. Eventually, he started his career with a program as a flute player.

== Singing career ==
Some of his fellow radio artists advised him to sing on account of the quality of his voice. Within a short time, he started singing regularly and appeared on Radio Pakistan Hyderabad as a singer. Here he became a student of Ustad Nazar Hussain and Bade Wahid Ali Khan. He later worked hard to learn the music of Shah Abdul Latif Bhittai’s poetry and became a successful singer.

Ustad Muhammad Juman brought out new colors, new ways and renovations to Sindhi music. He used to work hard and composed countless musical melodies. He had his own unique style of singing which was appreciated not only by public but also by other musicians. He sang the poetry of mystic poets but specially sang Shah Abdul Latif Bhittai with great love. One of the famous kafi song "Muhinjo Mulk Malir, Kotan Main Aaun Keean Guzariyan" was recorded for film Umer-Marvi. His famous and evergreen Kafi was "Yaar Dadhi Isaq Aatish lai Hai".

Muhammad Juman also performed in India, Bangladesh, Japan, Australia and many other countries. Veteran singers like Lata Mangeshkar, Noor Jehan and Abida Parveen have praised his singing talent. Former Prime Minister of Pakistan, Zulfiqar Ali Bhutto also was an admirer and used to invite him for his personal gatherings.

== Awards and recognition ==
- Pride of Performance Award by the Government of Pakistan in 1980.
- Government of Sindh, Culture department has inaugurated a music gallery for him in recognition of his services at Sindh Museum, Hyderabad, Sindh.
- Latif Award.
- Sachal Sarmast Award.

== Music training ==
Muhammad Jumman received his music education from Ustad Nazar Hussain and Bari Waheed Ali Khan, expert on Bhittai's Surs (Symphonies). He became very famous when he sang a Sindhi Kalam of Shah Abdul Latif Bhittai:

منهنجو ملڪ ملير،ڪوٽن ۾ آءُ ڪيئن گذاريان
Munhjo Mulk Maleer for film Umar Marvi

This Kalam (Song) was composed by the notable musician Deebo Bhattacharya. Muhammad Jumman became well-known everywhere after performing a Saraiki Kafi of Usman Faqir:

Yaar Dadhi Ishq Atish Lai Hai

Muhammad Juman was a regular performer of Sufi music on Pakistan Television shows.

He also sang Mir Sikandar Khan Khoso's kafis "Ishq munjhon izhar thee ayo" and "Kech Punhal day hal kahay hal" at Radio Pakistan. Juman's son, Shafi Muhammad, also followed his style of kafi singing.

== Death ==
He died on 24 January 1990 at a Karachi hospital due to complications from hepatitis and diabetes. He was buried at Mewa Shah Graveyard, Karachi.
