= Manzoor Ali Khan =

Pakistani singer (1922–1980)

Manzoor Ali Khan Latif Award PP
- استاد منظور علي خان
- Manzoor Ali Khan performing
- Born: 1922; Shikarpur, Sindh, Pakistan
- Died: 9 September 1980 (aged 57–58); Tando Adam Khan, Sindh, Pakistan
- Occupation: Classical music singer
- Years active: 1940–1980
- Awards: Pride of Performance Award by the President of Pakistan in 1978

Ustad Manzoor Ali Khan (Sindhi: استاد منظور علي خان) (1922 – 9 September 1980) was a Pakistani singer belonging to the Gwalior gharana singing style, one of the oldest singing traditions in Hindustani classical music. Born in Shikarpur, Sindh, Pakistan, he was the first classical musician of the twentieth century who knew about the regional music of Sindh.

== Early life ==
Manzoor's father had migrated from Gurdaspur, Punjab, British India and came to live at Khairpur, Sindh because of the ruling Talpurs, who were quite fond of his music. The family soon shifted to Shikarpur.

Manzoor was born in 1922 in Shikarpur, Sindh, Pakistan. He studied there up to secondary school level and later moved to Tando Adam Khan with his father in 1940.

== Musical career ==
Manzoor Ali Khan took musical lessons from his father, Jamalo Khan and another musician Seendho Khan. His parents took him to musical events in Sindh and Punjab. He was a maestro in singing Tappa, a form of classical music, in Pakistan. He made various compositions and also composed and sang Shah Abdul Latif Bhittai's poetry in all forms. He performed at Pakistan Broadcasting Corporation Karachi and then at Hyderabad from 1955, and Pakistan Television Corporation Karachi center in the same years. Many cassette companies have released the volumes of his programs.

== Languages ==
His mother tongue was Punjabi, however he used to speak and write in Sindhi. His children also received education in Sindhi language.

== Awards ==
Manzoor Ali Khan received several awards. He was honored with the title of "Bahar-e-Moseeqi" by Makhdoom Talib ul Mola at the Urs of Shah Abdul Latif Bhittai in 1960.

The Government of Pakistan bestowed on him the presidential Pride of Performance award in 1978.

== Death and legacy ==
He died from a heart attack on 9 September 1980.

In December 2010, Sindh Minister for Culture Sassui Palijo, paying tributes to Manzoor Ali Khan, called him the symbol and identity of Sindhi classical music.

Former Chief Minister of Sindh, Ghous Ali Shah was a fan of Manzoor Ali Khan for a long time. He recalled that he could not forget the excellent performance of Manzoor Ali Khan at the wedding ceremony of brother of noted story writer Naseem Kharal. He also said that Manzoor Ali Khan could sing, with equal mastery, poetry of almost all Sufi poets of Sindh including Shah Abdul Latif Bhittai.
