= Kafi =

Classical Sufi music originating from the Punjab and Sindh

Kafi is a classical form of Sufi music in the Punjabi and Sindhi languages that originated from the Punjab and Sindh regions of South Asia. Some well-known Kafi poets are Baba Farid, Bulleh Shah, Shah Hussain, Shah Abdul Latif Bhittai, Sachal Sarmast and Khwaja Ghulam Farid. This poetry style has also lent itself to the Kafi genre of singing, popular throughout South Asia, especially Pakistan, Bangladesh and India. Over the years, both Kafi poetry and its rendition have experienced rapid growth phases as various poets and vocalists added their own influences to the form, creating a rich and varied poetic form, yet through it all it remained centered on the dialogue between the Soul and the Creator, symbolized by the murid (disciple) and his Murshid (Master), and often by lover and his Beloved.

The word Kafi is derived from the Arabic qāfiya (قافية) meaning 'rhyme'. The genre is said to be derived from the Arabic poetry genre, qasidah, a monorhyme ode that is always meant to be sung, using one or two lines as a refrain that is repeated to create a mood. Kafi poetry is usually themed around heroic and great romantic tales from the folkfore, often used as a metaphor for mystical truths, and spiritual longing.

== Kafi singing ==
In musical terms, kafi refers to the genre of Punjabi and Sindhi classical music which utilizes the verses of kafi poets such as Bulleh Shah and Shah Hussain. Kafi music is devotional music, normally associated with the Sufi orders or Tariqah of Islam in South Asia, and was sung by dervishes or fakirs (Islamic mendicants), solo or in groups, as an offering to their murshid, spiritual guide.

It is characterized by a devotional intensity in its delivery, and as such overlaps considerably with the Qawwali genre. Just like Qawwali, its performances often took place at the dargahs (mausoleums) of various Sufi saints in the region. However, unlike Qawwali, the musical arrangement is much simpler and may only include one harmonium, one tabla, one dholak and a single vocalist. The emphasis remains on the words rather than the music itself, since the central aim of Kafi music is to convey the essence of the mystical lyrics. The central verse is often repeated. There are no fixed styles of singing of Kafi. Traditionally dervishes in Sindh used instruments like yaktaro, a one-stringed plucked instrument, and wooden clappers, chappars, though many contemporary singers have chosen their own variations.

== Rise of Kafi singing ==
Some of the early notable exponents of this form in the 1930s, when classical singing became highly popular, were Ustad Ashiq Ali Khan of the Patiala gharana, who used the dhrupad style in his rendition of Sindhi Kafis, and his contemporary in Sindhi Kafi singing, Ustad Allahdino Noonari, who used the fusion form.

Kafi has gained a higher profile in the West in the late 20th century, thanks to the Pakistani singer Abida Parveen, who, like qawwali maestro Nusrat Fateh Ali Khan, has performed in front of the Western audiences.

Sanam Marvi from Hyderabad is another singer and vocalist, performing Kafi-based Sufi songs. Mooralala Marwada, a noted Sufi folk singer from Kutch, is an exponent of this form, and featured in Coke Studio.
