= Abida Parveen =

Pakistani Sufi singer

Abida Parveen NI HI SI PP
- عابده پروين
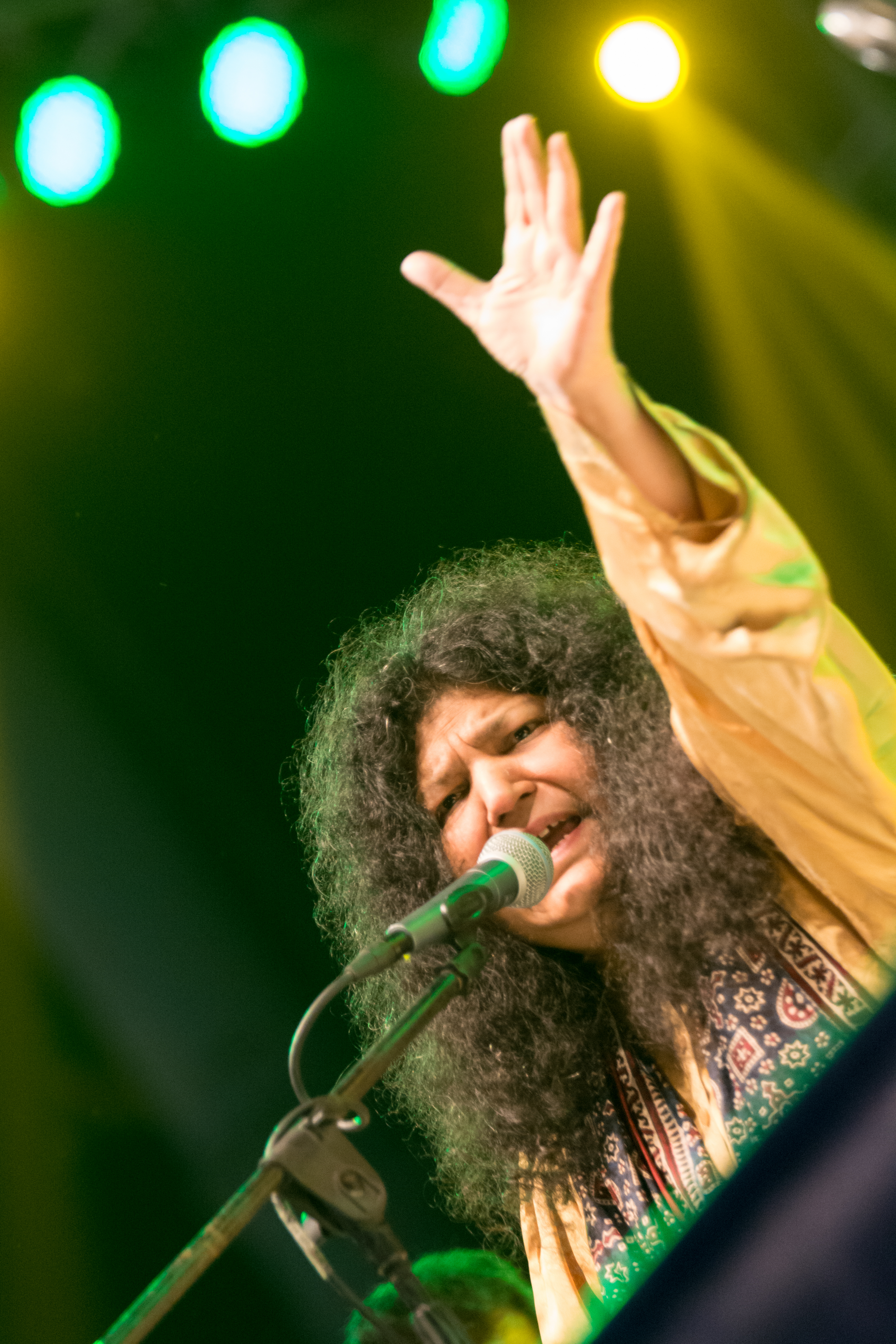
- Abida Parveen in 2016
- Born: 20 February 1954 (age 72); Larkana, Sindh, Pakistan
- Other names: Living legend of Pakistan; Queen of Sufi music
- Occupations: Singer; musician; entrepreneur; composer
- Musical career
- Origin: Pakistan
- Genres: Sufi; kafi; ghazal; qawwali
- Instruments: Vocals; harmonium; percussions
- Years active: 1973–present
- Labels: Coke studio, PTV, etc
- Website: abidaparveen.com.pk

Abida Parveen (Sindhi: عابده پروين; Urdu: عابدہ پروین; born 20 February 1954) is a Pakistani singer, composer, musician of Sufi music, painter and an entrepreneur. Often dubbed the Queen of Sufi music, Parveen is one of the highest-paid and most decorated vocalists in Pakistan.

Born and raised in Larkana into a Sindhi Sufi family, she was trained by her father, Ustad Ghulam Haider, who was a famous singer and music teacher. She plays the pump organ, keyboard, and sitar. Parveen started performing in the early 1970s and came into global prominence in the 1990s. Since 1993, Parveen has toured globally, performing her first international concert at Buena Park, California. She has also performed in Churches, several times. Parveen features in Pakistan's popular musical show Coke Studio and was a judge on the pan-South Asia contest show Sur Kshetra alongside Runa Laila and Asha Bhosle, hosted by Ayesha Takia. She had appeared in various Indian and Pakistani music reality shows, including Pakistan Idol, Chhote Ustaad, and STAR Voice of India. In the last few years, she has sung in a Pepsi commercial, collaborating with Atif Aslam for this.

Parveen is regularly referred to as one of the world's greatest mystic singers. She sings mainly ghazals, thumri, khyal, qawwali, raga (raag), Sufi rock, classical and semi-classical music, and her speciality, kafi, a solo genre accompanied by percussion and harmonium, using a repertoire of songs by Sufi poets. Parveen sings in Urdu, Sindhi, Punjabi, Arabic, and Persian. Parveen notably sang a famous song in Nepali language called "Ukali Orali Haruma", originally by Nepali singer Tara Devi, in a concert in Kathmandu, Nepal, and in 2017, she was designated a 'Peace Ambassador' by SAARC.

Parveen is best known for singing in an impassioned, loud voice, especially on the songs Yaar ko Humne from the album Raqs-e-Bismil and Tere Ishq Nachaya, which is a rendition of Bulleh Shah's poetry. She was bestowed Pakistan's second highest civilian award, Hilal-e-Imtiaz, in 2012 and the highest civilian award, Nishan-e-Imtiaz, in March 2021, by the President of Pakistan.

== Early life ==
Parveen was born in Ali Goharabad, Larkana, Sindh, Pakistan. She received her musical training initially from her father, Ustad Ghulam Haider, whom she refers to as Baba Sain and Gawwaya. He had his own musical school, where Parveen got her devotional inspiration. She and her father would often perform at shrines of Sufi saints. Parveen's talent compelled her father to choose her as his musical heir over his two sons. Growing up, she attended her father's music school, where her foundation in music was laid. Later, Ustad Salamat Ali Khan of the Sham Chaurasia gharana also taught and nurtured her. Parveen always remembers that she was never forced into this occupation, and she sang her first complete kalam when she was only 3 years old.

== Career ==
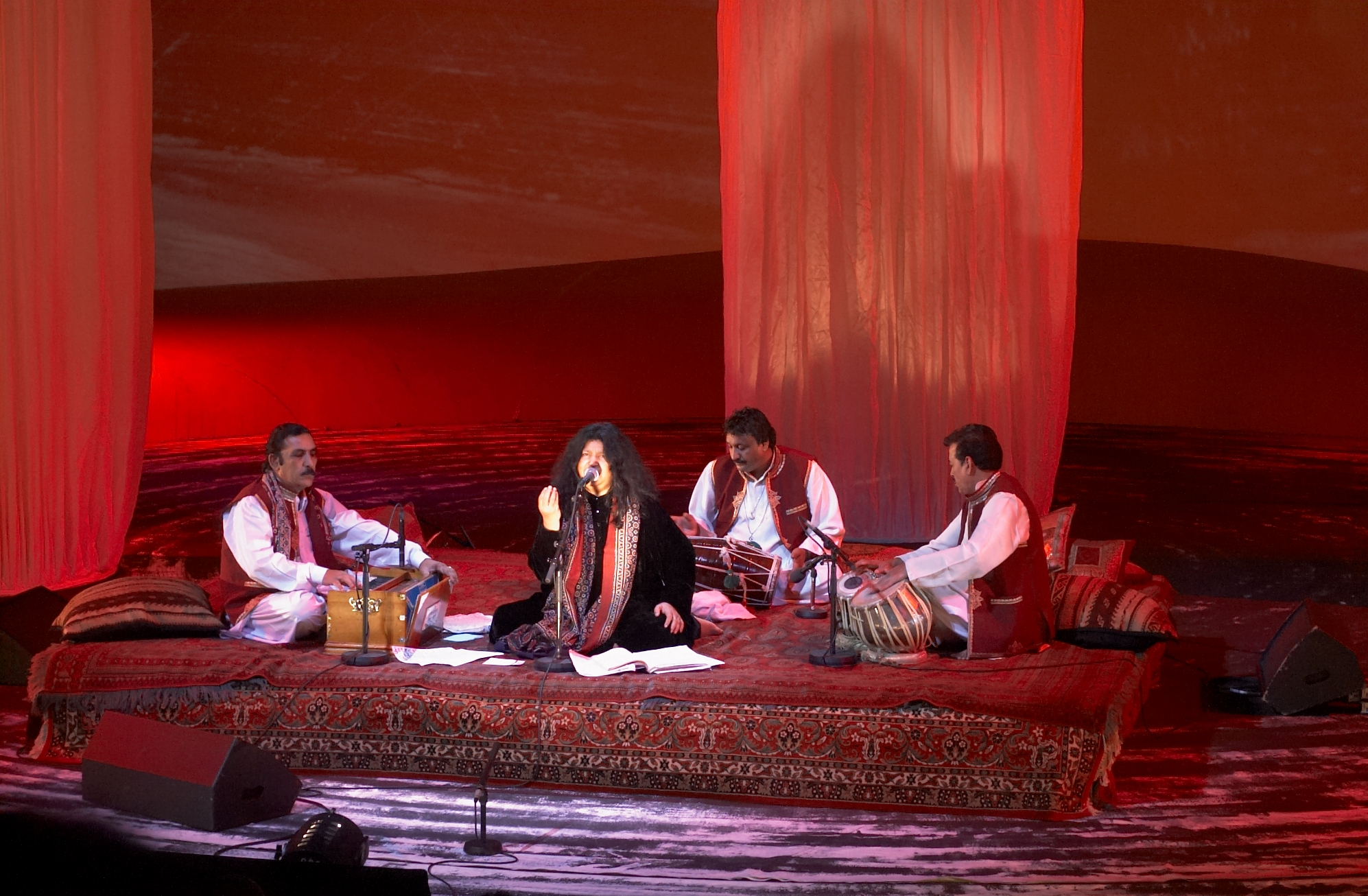
Parveen at her concert in Oslo, 2007

Parveen had already begun performing at Dargahs and Urs in the early 1970s, but it was in 1973, on Radio Pakistan, that she achieved her first real breakthrough with the Sindhi song Tuhinje zulfan jay band kamand widha. In 1977, she was introduced as an official singer on Radio Pakistan. Since then, Parveen has risen to prominence and is now considered one of the finest vocal artists in Pakistan. She has imbued Sufi music with a new identity, marking the beginning of this journey at Sultana Siddiqui's Awaz-o-Andaz in 1980.

Parveen travels internationally, often performing at sold-out venues. Her 1988 performance in Chicago was recorded by the Hazrat Amir Khusrau Society of Art and Culture, which issued an LP of her songs. Her 1989 performance in London's Wembley Conference Centre was broadcast on the BBC. Parveen cites her motivation for international travel as being to spread Sufism, peace, and the divine message. In doing so, she also promotes Pakistani culture.

In the 1990s, Parveen licensed her spiritual ghazals to Bollywood, since her "spiritual brother", Khan, recorded songs for Bollywood. Recently, Abida also performed at the grand finale of the Sindh Festival, arranged by Bilawal Bhutto Zardari in Thatta.

- Abida made a special appearance in the super hit Lollywood movie Zindagi, starring Sultan Rahi, Arif Lohar and Attaullah Khan Esakhelvi in the lead cast, for which she performed her famous rendition of Sufi Sachal Sarmast's "Mahi Yar Di Gharoli Bhar Di".
- In 2000, she performed at "Music of the East: 2000" at the ICC Birmingham organized by Iqbal Academy (UK).
- In 2007, Parveen collaborated with Shehzad Roy on a song entitled Zindagi, dedicated to children's social problems.
- In the same year, she performed at the annual Oslo Mela in Norway.
- In 2010, Parveen performed at London's prestigious Royal Albert Hall, along with Bollywood playback singer Sonu Nigam.
- In 2010, Parveen performed at the Asia Society's Sufi Music Festival in New York City.
- In 2010, she performed in Union Square, Manhattan, at the first Sufi Music Festival in New York City.
- Parveen performs annually at the Indian filmmaker Muzaffar Ali's Jahan-e-Khusrau event, where she is reputed to be the top performer.
- In 2010, she judged the Indo-Pak venture Sur Kshetra TV Show.
- She performed at the 2013 Manchester International Festival in Bridgewater Hall.
- Abida also collaborated in Manchester in 2013 with composer John Tavener on the composition 'Mahamatar' for a Werner Herzog film about pilgrimage.
- She had performed at the Holland Festival 2014 in Stopera, Amsterdam.
- Praveen was the grand performer of the Dhaka International Folk Fest, 2015 in Bangladesh, where she also received an award.
- In the Sindh Literature Festival, 2016, she performed the grand show and cut the ribbon on its inauguration alongside SLF chairperson.
- In the same year, she performed at the 2nd International Sufi Festival at Karachi.
- In 2016, she collaborated with Indian music director duo Salim–Sulaiman and an orchestra in Toronto (Canada) for a special song called "Noor e Illahi", released on Eid.
- In 2017, on New Year's Eve Abida released 'Mulk e Khuda, a patriotic song featuring the natural sites and landscapes of Pakistan.
- She performed in the finale of the Alchemy Festival 2017 at the Southbank Centre in London.
- In the same year, a music video of the romantic gazal "Ahat Si" was released by Abida feat. Saima Ajram.
- Her performance includes the annual Faiz International Festival on the death anniversary of Faiz Ahmad Faiz.

=== Coke Studio appearances ===
Parveen began performing on the internationally acclaimed Pakistani show Coke Studio in 2010. She sang three songs: "Ramooz-e-Ishq", "Nigah-e-Darwaishaan", and "Soz-e-Ishq" in episodes 1 (reason), 3 (conception), and 5 (realisation), respectively of season 3. Parveen said she admired the programme because it offered a Dargahi environment. She commented:

"This project, which Rohail Hyatt has started, is indeed great, and I would like to be a part of it for a long time. The music that comes out of this project reaches both the heart and the soul, and it always complements the lyrics without overriding the true message of the kalams. This platform builds on those messages of our Sufi elders."

She was invited back to season 7 in 2014. She sang "Mein Sufi Hoon" with Rais Khan and performed "dost" as a solo. She also performed "Chaap Tilak" (a popular Sufi poem by Sufi poet Amir Khusro) in a duet with Rahat Fateh Ali Khan.

Abida was also part of season 9. Her first song, along with other artists in the season, "Ae Rah Haq K Shaheedo", was dedicated to the war martyrs. After that, she sang a duet with Ali Sethi titled "Aaqa", then sang a solo titled "Maula-i-Kull".

She also performed in season 14, singing "Tu Jhoom" with Naseebo Lal.

== Quotes ==
- "Pakistan seems disconnected from the outside. But it is built and runs on the prayers of our Sufi kings, our pirs. Poor people, rich people—we are all God's servants ... I'm lucky. My audience is my God."
- "The songs purify the soul of a human being; the human is so involved that he has left God. The songs bring us near to God, near the Almighty, so that the human soul should be purified and satisfied."

== Personal life ==
=== Education ===
Abida got her master's degree from Sindh and also learned Urdu, Sindhi, and Persian specifically.

=== Marriage and family ===
In 1975, Abida married Ghulam Hussain Sheikh, senior producer at Radio Pakistan, who had retired from his job in the 1980s to manage and mentor Parveen's career. After he died of a heart attack on an international flight in the early 2000s, their daughter Maryam took up that role. There is a sense that Parveen's career has taken a more commercial route as a result of it. The couple has two daughters, Pereha Ikram and Maryam Hussain, and a son, Sarang Latif, who is a music director. All three children act as her advisors. Her family understands her need for riyaz (daily vocal music practice) and the required space to do that practice.

=== Abida Parveen Gallery ===
Parveen is also interested in the arts. She owns the Abida Parveen Gallery, which features jewellery, paintings, her music CDs, an awards section, and garments and accessories. It is run by her daughters. She also has her own music recording studio there.

=== Clothing style ===
Parveen has a distinctive clothing style that she has created herself for ease and comfort. She wears long, simple frocks buttoned up to the top with loose arms with or without cuffs and covered with a coat. She is always accompanied by an Ajrak, a Sindhi shawl, which she claims comes from the dargah (mausoleum) of Sufi saint Shah Abdul Latif Bhittai, and her wardrobe is full of it.

=== Other ===
Parveen has taken Bayyat and became a disciple of Najeeb Sultan, her spiritual master. Parveen suffered a heart attack during a performance in Lahore on 28 November 2010. Angiography and angioplasty were performed on her. She regained her health soon after.

== Awards and recognitions ==
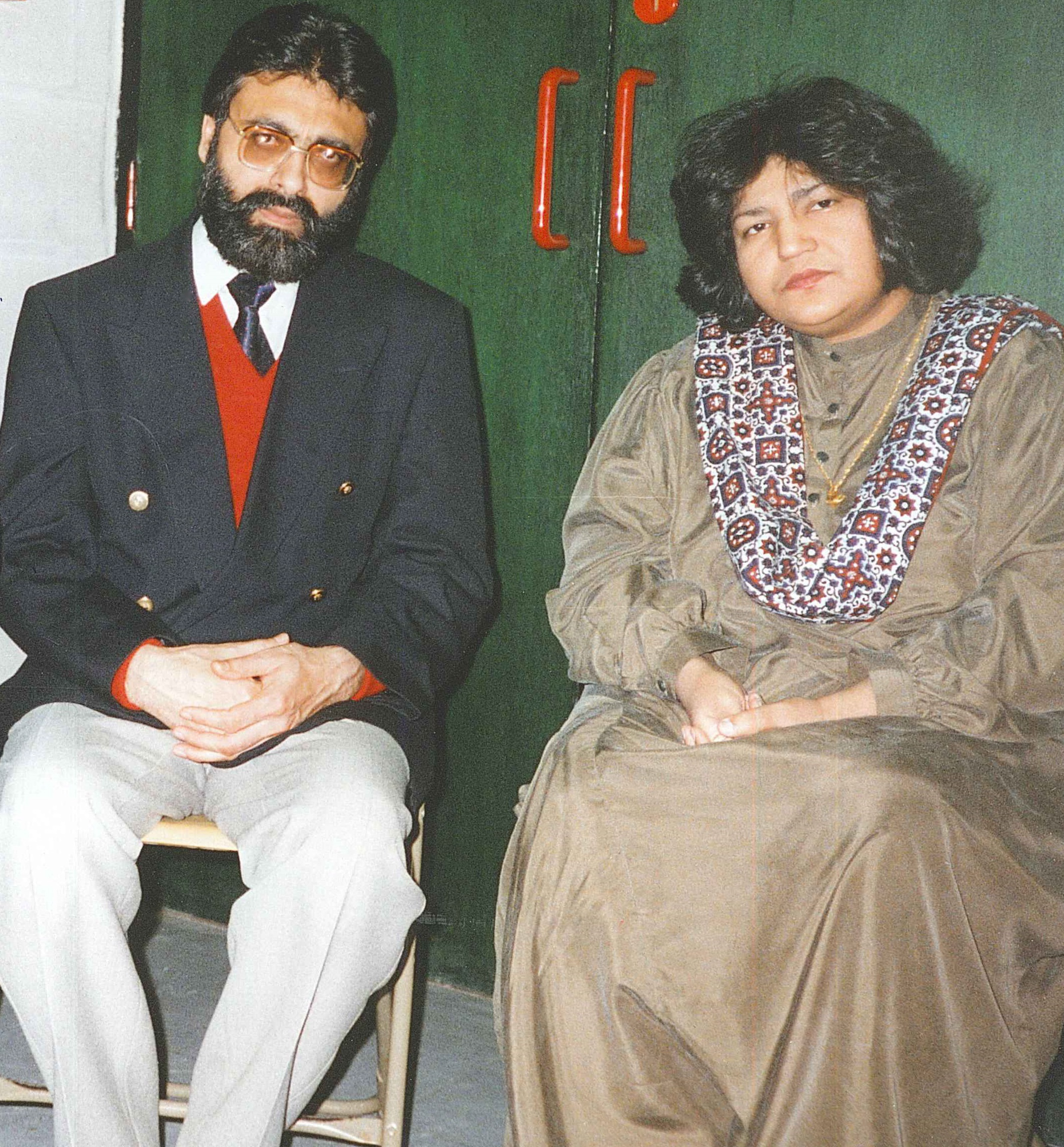
Parveen with the Pushto singer Fazal Malik Akif in Manchester, 1994.

- Pride of Performance Award (1984) by the President of Pakistan
- Latif Award (twice)
- Sindh Graduate Association Award
- Pakistan Television Award
- Sachal Sarmast Honor
- 9th PTV Awards for Best Singer in 1998
- Sitara-e-Imtiaz Award (2005) by President Pervez Musharaff
- Hilal-e-Imtiaz Award (2012) by President Asif Ali Zardari
- Lifetime Achievement Award at the Kaladharmi Begum Akhtar Academy of Ghazal in India (2012).
- Honored at the 16th Pakistan Television Awards Ceremony-PTV Award. (2011)
- Nominated for Best Original Sound Track (OST) for Yaar Ko Hamne Jabaja Dekha at 12th Lux Style Awards. (2013)
- Wonder Woman of the Year (2013)
- 1st ARY Film Awards for Best Playback Singer for the film Ishq Khuda (2014).
- Gold Crown on glorious 40 years in the Music Industry by the Sindhi Singers Association in Larkana. (2014)
- Pakistani Diplomat Javed Malik presented an Ambassador's Recognition Award in Dubai (2015).
- Tributed at the 17th PTV Awards in the category of 'Legends'. (2012)
- 3rd Hum Awards for excellence in Music . (2015)
- She had been awarded in Dhaka International Folk Fest 2015.
- She had been awarded in 2nd International Sufi Conference, 2016 in Karachi by famous politician Sharmila Farooqi.
- 15th Lux Style Awards for best female singer(film)in 2016.
- Saima Ajram, a presenter at BBC Asian Network, presented a lifetime achievement award to her at her home in 2016.
- PISA Lifetime Achievement Award - 2020.
- Nishan-e-Imtiaz by President Arif Alvi - 23 March 2021.

== Filmography ==
Despite Parveen's renown, she has never sung for the cinema industry; her existing work has been repurposed and used in films, however, at the insistence of proponents such as Farooq Mengal. Parveen revealed in interviews that she has received offers from Bollywood filmmakers such as Subhash Ghai and Yash Chopra. Shah Rukh Khan requested that she sing in Ra.One, as did music director A. R. Rahman. Parveen declines these offers on account of her Sufi faith and the commitments that it requires.

=== Television ===
Year	Show	Role	Notes
1980	Awaz-o-Andaz	Performer	aired on PTV
2009	Nara-e-Mastana	Performer	Concert sponsored and aired by Hum
2010	Chotte Ustad	Guest Judge with Ghulam Ali	Eid Celebration
2012	Sur Kshetra TV Show	Judge	Representing Pakistan in India
2012	Shehr-e-Zaat	OST Singer for Yaar ko Humne	Pre-recorded from album Raqs-e-Bismil
2012	Jhalak Dikhhla Jaa	Special appearance with Runa Laila	To promote Sur Kshetra TV Show
2012	1st Hum Awards	Performer	Sang Naraye Mastana
2014	Pakistan Idol TV Show	Guest Judge	Grand Finale
2014	Zee Channel	TV Singer	New Channel
2014	Sama-e-Ishq	Performer	Concert aired on Hum TV

=== Films ===
Year	Film	Song	Notes
2005	Viruddh	Mann Lago Yaar; Bhala Hua Meri; Saahib Mera Ek	From her album "Kabir by Abida"
2008	Zill-e-Shah	Sajjan de Haath	Pre-recorded
2013	Ishq Khuda	Title Track	Pre-recorded; Winner-1st ARY Film Awards for Best Female Playback Singer
2015	Jaanisaar	Sufiye Ba Safa Manam (female)	Indian film by Muzaffar Ali
2015	Bin Roye	Maula Maula	with Zeb Bangash; Winner-15th Lux Style Awards for Best Female Playback Singer
2017	Rangreza	Phool Khil Jayein	with Asrar (musician)
