= Folk dances of Sindh =

Set of dances from Sindh

Folk dances of Sindh (Sindhi: سنڌ جا لوڪ ناچ) are the traditional dances of the Sindhi people, which are indigenous to Sindh region which is now in Pakistan. These dances are performed at various events including marriages, religious ceremonies, and special occasions such as a child being born, and for cultural purposes.

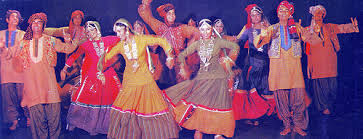
Sindhi "Ho Jamalo" dance by a group.

== History ==
Dances in early-medieval Sindh had great prominence in social and religious life, as described by the scriptures found in Mohenjo Daro. The dancing girl from Mohenjo Daro Sambara is a famous statue.

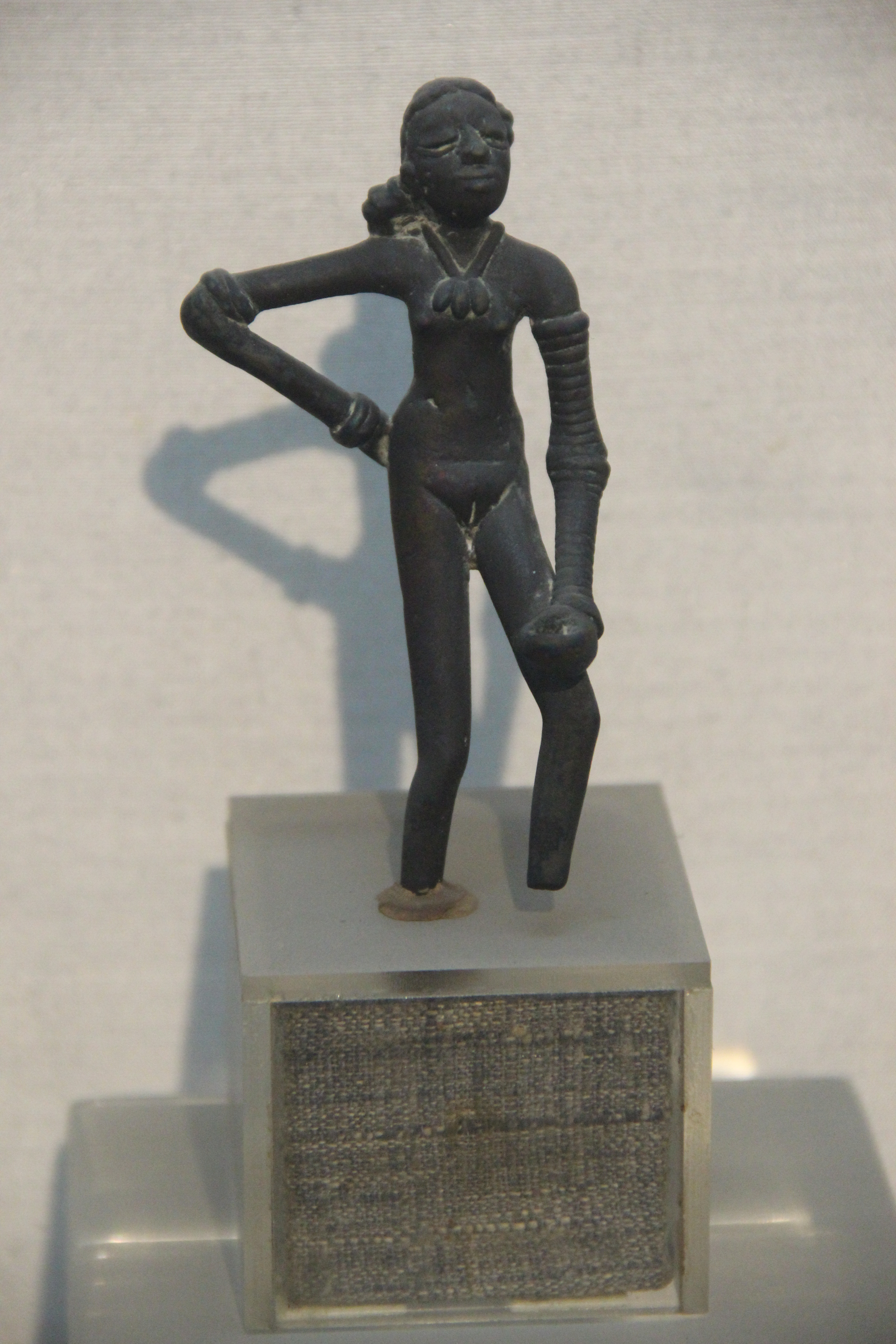
Bronze "Dancing Girl," Mohenjo-daro, c. 2500 BC

== Overview ==
Dances of Sindh include the famous Ho-Jamalo and Dhammal. Other common dances include Jhumar/Jhumir (different from the Jhumar dance of South Punjab), Kafelo, Dandio, Talli and Jhamelo. However, none of these have survived as much as Ho-Jamalo, Jhumir and Dhammal. At weddings, childbirth and other special occasions, a special type of song is sung, known as Ladas, Sehra or Geech. These are mostly performed by women.

== Dances ==
=== Jamalo ===
Jamalo is a famous Sindhi dance, which is performed by Sindhis across the world. It was historically performed only by men, and is performed in a group, either in a circle or a square. Ho-Jamalo" is a folk song that specifically accompanies this dance, and is sung by one lead man, standing in middle of circle or on one side, while other men dance and chant Ho-Jamalo!. The words of the song praise beauty, nature, and the bravery and culture of Sindhi people of different regions like Uttar, Lar, Thar and Kachho.

=== Jhumar ===
Jhumar, also known as jhumir, is a dance performed by men and women while singing the Lada, Sehra or Geech (folk wedding songs), accompanied by the dhul, shahnai and muto. It is performed at weddings and other special days like Chhatri, Akiko, Tohar, Mangno or Sukhan. The dance is performed individually. Although there are many variations of Jhumir, it is generally performed by moving the hands in circles, clapping, and making swirls called Pherio or Pher'rio, as well as some other moves. Each region of Sindh has its own variations of Jhumir. Relatives and friends would shower money on performers, a practice referred to as ghor. Some variations of Jhumir dance are: Jahmat Jhumir, Mandi Jhumir, Pali Kapanwari Jhumir, Tay Taari Jhumir, Kanday Kadharwari Jhumir, Pheriwari Jhumir, and Rahki Pokh Jhumir.

=== Chhej ===
Chhej is a pure dance performed at every happy moment, like weddings or eids, while Sindhi Hindus perform it on Behrano and Holi. It is performed in a circle of at least seven and up to fifty people. The performers wear the same clothes, and each person has one, two or three sticks of wood called "Donko" of "Donki", decorated with Jandri lacquer art, shiny pompoms and ghunghroo. In the middle of the circle there is one "Dhulari" (drummer) and one "Shernayo" (Shernai player), in traditional clothes and turbans. While everyone performs the dance accompanied by these instruments, different "Sur" are played on the drums, such as Sandhro, Bhero, Kohyari, Hussaini, Talang, Khamāch, Malkauns or Sunhri, while the Shernayo plays Pahari sur. There are also different styles of Chej according to sound, steps etc. This is the most energetic dance, which starts slow and slowly gets faster. Chej performers are called "Chhejjāri".

Although Chhej has seen a decline in Sindh, it remains popular among Sindhi Hindus and diaspora.

=== Bhagat ===
Bhagat is a folk dance performed by professionals at fairs, events and shows to entertain visitors. The performance usually starts at night and lasts till the early hours of morning. Only men are allowed to perform the Bhagat. Two or more performers interact to weave folktales in song. The lead singer, called the Bhagat, is dressed in a Jamo (a long coat), Pagadi (headgear), Chher (anklets) and Kundal (earrings). The backup singers are usually dressed up as women and are addressed by the Bhagat with female names. The Bhagat was a hugely popular form of entertainment during festivals, marriages and fairs held in mandirs and dargahs.

=== Dhamaal ===
Dhamaal is a mystical dance mainly performed by faqirs, dervishes and sufi saints and devotees. The main performers wear an all red Jamo and Sindhi Patko turban, since red is the color of Lal Shahbaz Qalandar, which is why he was called "Lal", meaning "Red". Dhamaal is characterized by religious fervor. Nagaro, Nobat, Gharyal and Ghugoo instruments provide the beat and tempo for the dance.

=== Saang ===
Saang is a folk dance, historically performed during a wedding ceremony. It was like an opera, with men and women dressed up and performing as characters. Women imitate the works and chores of women and men imitate male works. In this dance, the performers sing as well and pass funny comments on each other.

=== Tapro ===
Tapro is the folk dance of the Holi festival.

=== Asimori ===
Asimori is a folk dance performed by young girls, in which two girls grab each other's hands and move in circles.

=== Sheedi folk dances ===
The Sheedi community of Sindh have their own traditional dances and music. There are many different styles - for example, one is performed by a group of men, dressed in attire decorated with peacock feathers and with face markings, in which they perform different stunts like fire breathing. Another style is an individual dance which is performed to the beat of a Mugarman, a type of kettle drum. There is also a sufi dance called Sheedi dhamal, performed at Sheedi mela at Mangopir in Karachi.

=== Thari folk dances ===
The Thari people have their own folk dances, including dandio, a dance performed using sticks; charuri, a folk dance performed in a circle using metal pots; and matiku.

The Mor Nāch, meaning "peacock dance", is performed by men and women dressed in a peacock costume made up of 1300 feathers and full make-up and jewelry. The dance usually imitates the peacock, and is performed at festivals, events and cultural shows. Master Ghulam Hussain is the pioneer of the Mor dance, and spread recognition of the Mor dance all over Pakistan.

=== Other regional folk dances ===
Muhana Dance: a folk dance performed by Mohana fishermen and fisherwomen.

Matkaywaro Nāch: a folk dance performed in Thatta, in which group of men stack matkas, or one matka balanced on a stick, on their heads.

Rasudo: a dance which originated in Nangarparkar, performed while singing folk rasuda songs.
