= Naya Nazimabad =

Naya Nazimabad نیا ناظم آباد
- Naya Nazimabad
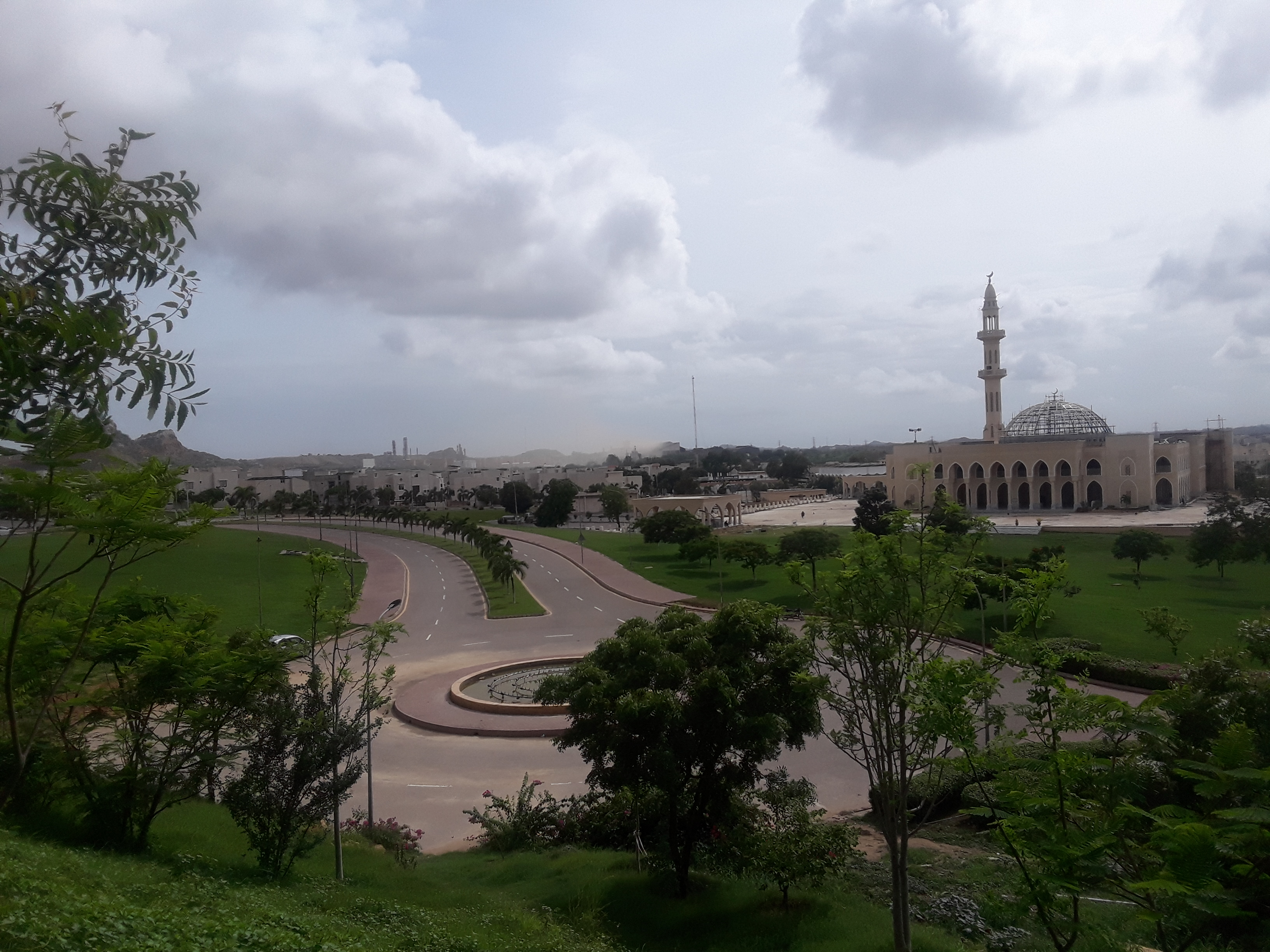

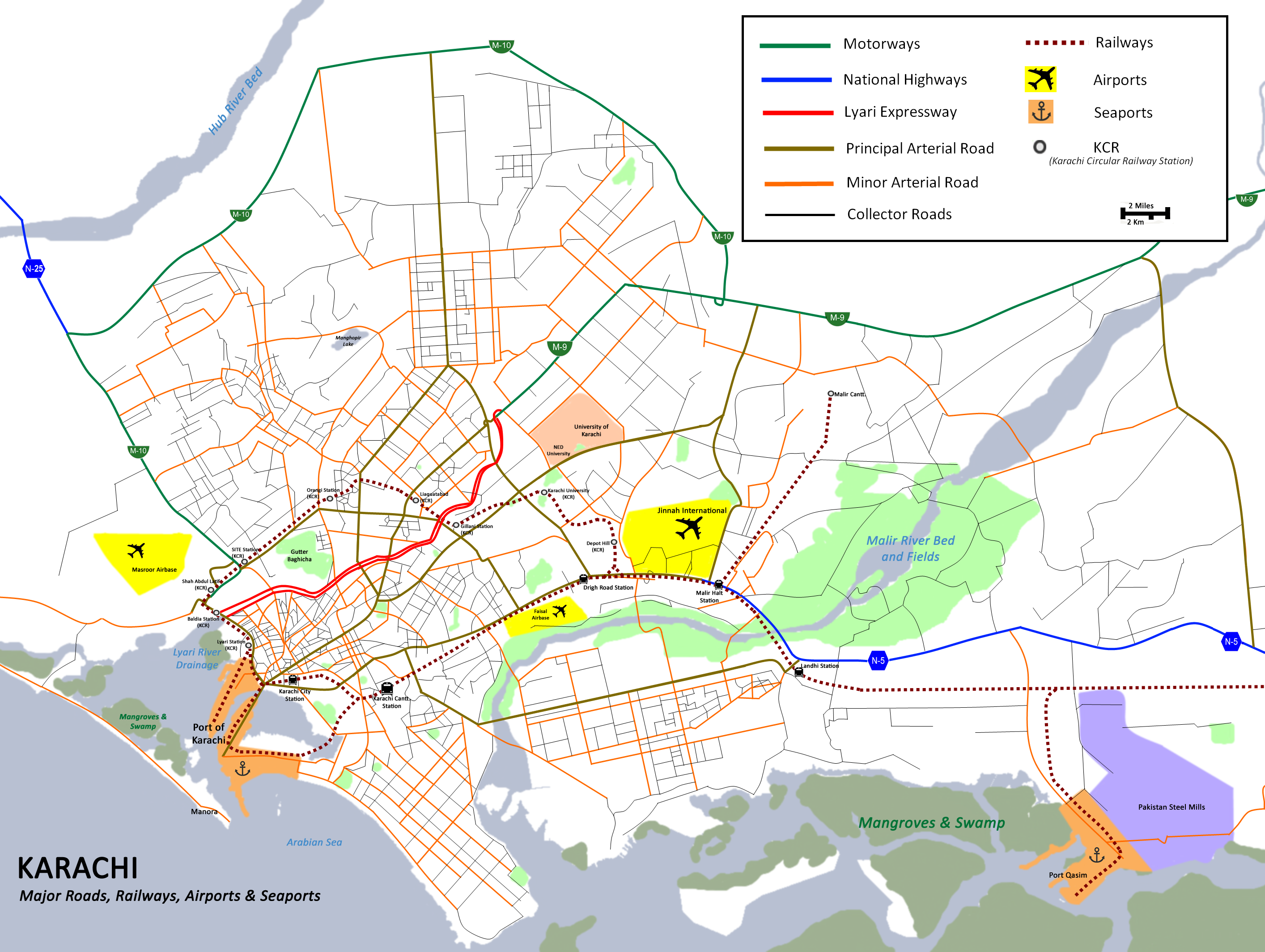
- Location within Karachi Location within Sindh
- Coordinates: 24.9753°N 67.0258°E

Area
  - Total: 530 ha (1,300 acres)
- Website: nayanazimabad.com

Naya Nazimabad (Urdu: نیا ناظم آباد), is a housing project that is being developed around the Manghopir Lake.

== Area ==
The total area of Naya Nazimabad is 1,300 acres.

== Investment ==
In 2020, Arif Habib proposed fresh investment of Rs 750 million into Naya Nazimabad.

== Ownership ==
Javedan Corporation Limited, a builder of Naya Nazimabad Housing Scheme, owned 928 acres 99-year leasehold land allotted in 1960/61; 310 acres freehold land, and 128 acres leasehold land allotted in 2011.

== Flooding ==
In 2020, the heavy rain in Karachi caused some blocks of the housing project to be flooded because of inadequate sewage and water disposal lines, the management was said to have taken measures to avoid such disasters in the future. Residents of some blocks complained of the challenges they faced, including having to temporarily relocate, as the water flooded their homes for over a week.

== Naya Nazimabad Flyover ==
Naya Nazimabad Flyover has been developed to provide a convenient thoroughfare to the residents of an upper-class residential area viz Naya Nazimabad by flying over the low-income community (Nusrat Bhutto Colony) that falls in between.

== Chemical dump ==
A case was filed in the Sindh High Court (SHC) against the Naya Nazimabad residential scheme near Manghopir that has allegedly been launched despite a report claiming that the area has been used dumping ground for factory waste. These chemicals are hazardous substances which could harm human health and/or the environment.

== See also ==
- Manghopir
- Nazimabad
- Gulshan-e-Iqbal
- North Nazimabad
- North Nazimabad Town
- North Karachi
- Environment of Karachi
- Pakistan Environmental Protection Agency
- Manghopir Lake
