= Javedan =

Javedan Corporation
- Formerly: Valika Cement Limited
- Type: Public
- Traded as: PSX: JVDC
- Industry: Cement; Real estate
- Founded: 1961; 65 years ago
- Headquarters: Karachi, Pakistan
- Area served: Karachi
- Key people: Samad A. Habib (CEO); Arif Habib (chairperson)
- Revenue: ▲ Rs. 11.187 billion (US$40 million) (2023)
- Net income: ▲ Rs. 8.007 billion (US$29 million) (2023)
- Total assets: ▲ Rs. 43.711 billion (US$160 million) (2023)
- Total equity: ▲ Rs. 25.978 billion (US$93 million) (2023)
- Owner: Arif Habib Equity (28.68%); Abdul Ghani (11.87%); Arif Habib (10.04%)
- Number of employees: 234 (2023)
- Subsidiaries: NN Maintenance Company; Sapphire Bay Development Company
- Website: jcl.com.pk
- Footnotes; Financials as of 30 June 2023

Javedan Corporation Limited, doing business as Naya Nazimabad (Urdu: نیا ناظم آباد), is a housing project that is being developed illegally around the Manghopir Lake.

In 2020, the heavy rain in Karachi caused some blocks of the housing project to be flooded because of inadequate sewage and water disposal lines, the management was said to have taken measures to avoid such disasters in the future. Residents of some blocks complained of the challenges they faced, including having to temporarily relocate, as the water flooded their homes for over a week.

== History ==
Javedan Cement Limited was originally incorporated in Pakistan as Valika Cement Limited on June 8, 1961 and was originally owned by Valika family until 1972 when it was nationalized by the government of Pakistan. In 1972, it was renamed as Javedan Cement Limited.

The Javedan Cement Limited (JCL) was privatized and sold at very low prices of Rs. 4.3 billion ($43 million) to Haji Ghani and Shunaid Qureshi. The new owners almost immediately stopped production, dismantled the cement factory and converted the 1,300 acres JCL land into a housing project worth over Rs. 100 billion ($1 billion). Experts believe the cost of total JCL land including mining land could easily cross Rs. 200 billion ($2 billion). The developers of Naya Nazimabad project includes owner of Arif Habib Equity. According to experts, the closing of Javedan Cement and establishment of Naya Nazimabad will cost Pakistan government $ 6 million annually.

Land was given initially for mining to the Javedan corporation for a mining lease only. Later, Arif Habib Ghani and Aqeel Karim Dhedhi, a business cartel, bought it with the help of government authorities and launched a housing project.

In 2020, Arif Habib proposed fresh investment of Rs 750 million into Naya Nazimabad.

== Naya Nazimabad ==
Naya Nazimabad نیا ناظم آباد
- Naya Nazimabad
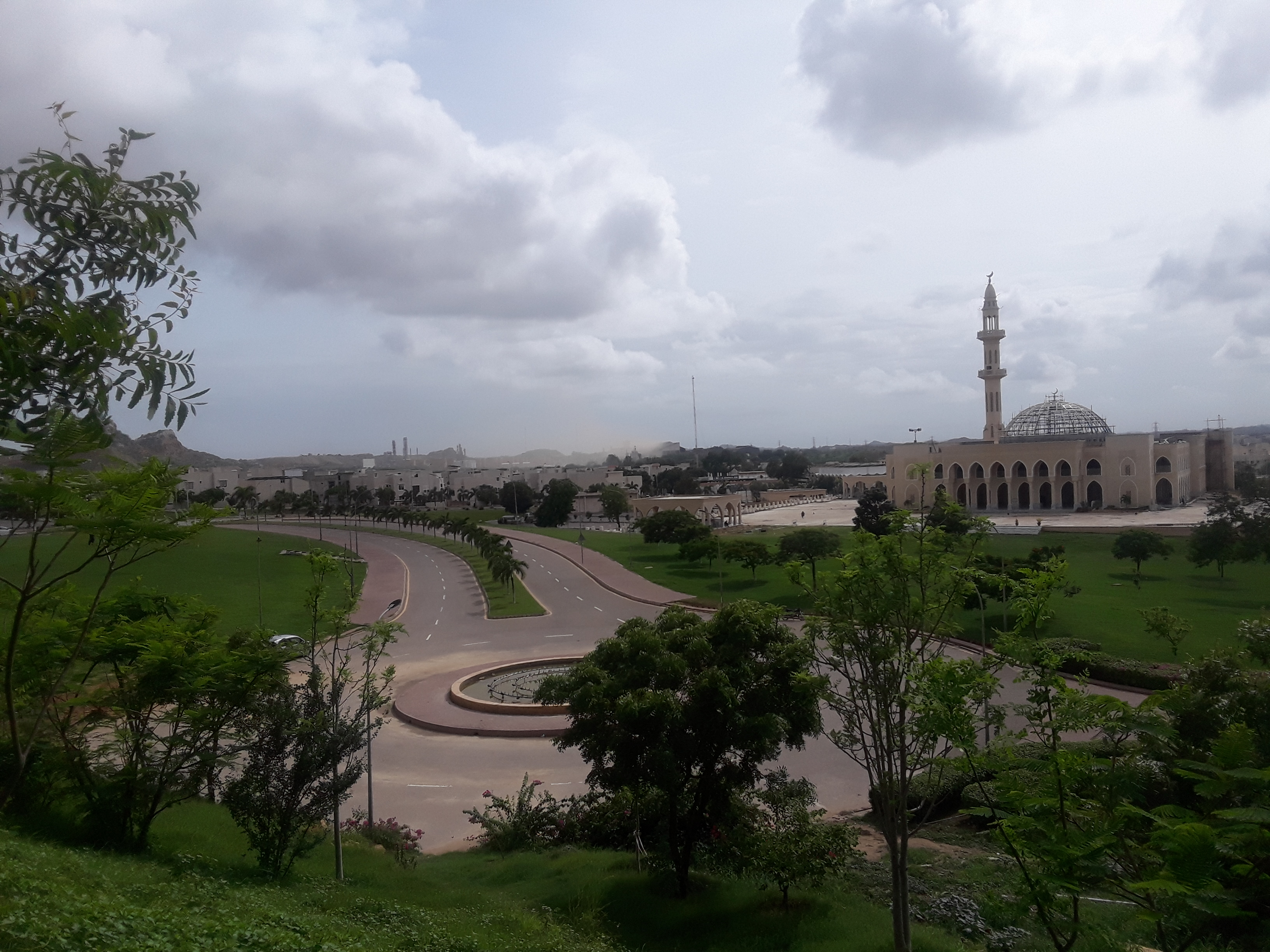
- Interactive map of Naya Nazimabad

Area
  - Total: 530 ha (1,300 acres)
- Website: nayanazimabad.com

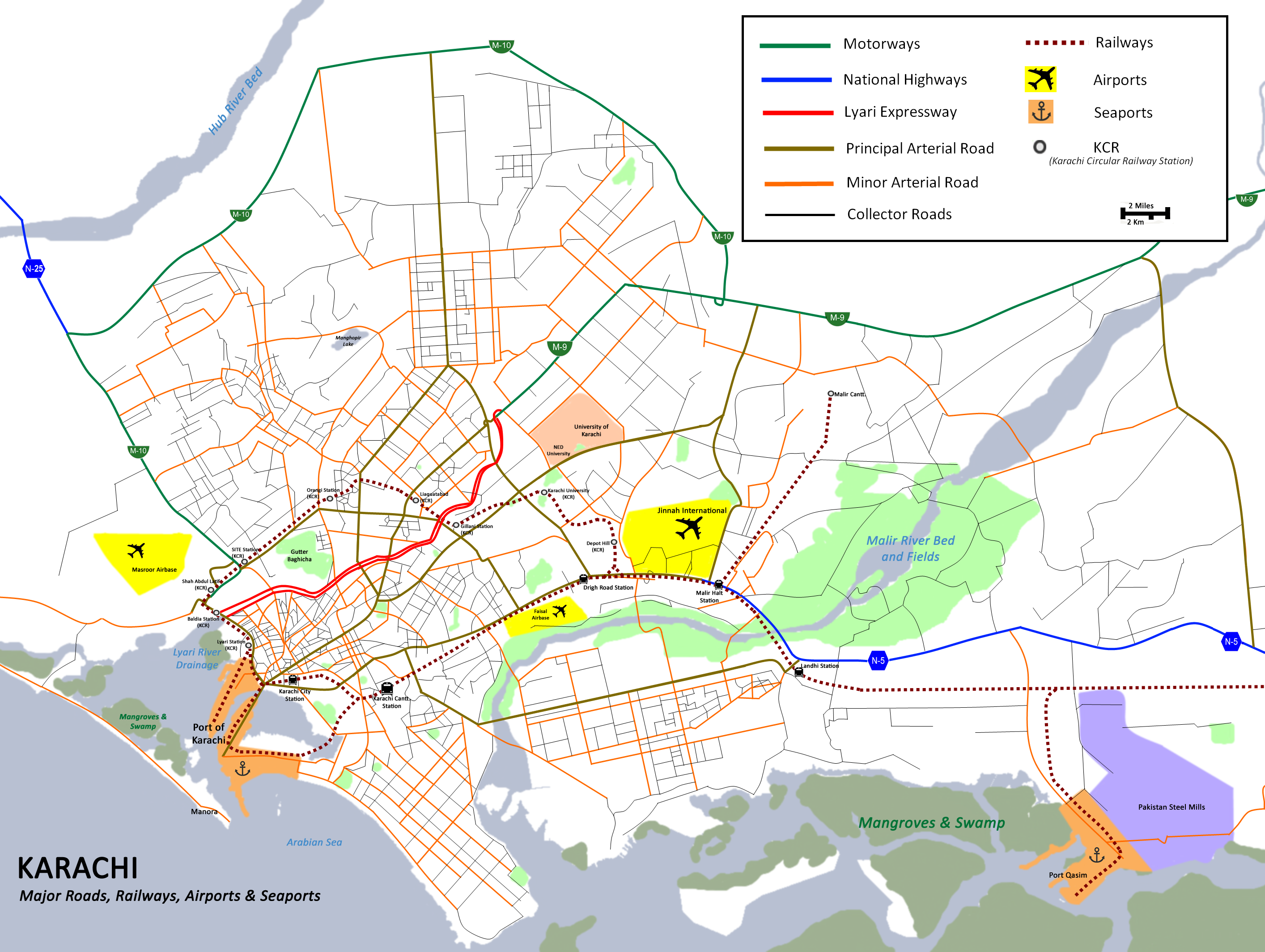
Location of Naya Nazimabad in Karachi

The total area of Naya Nazimabad is 1,300 acres.

== Javedan Corporation Limited ==
Javedan Corporation Limited, a builder of Naya Nazimabad Housing Scheme, owned 928 acres 99-year leasehold land allotted in 1960/61; 310 acres freehold land, and 128 acres leasehold land allotted in 2011.

== Controversies ==
=== Chemical dump ===
A case was filed in the Sindh High Court (SHC) against the Naya Nazimabad residential scheme near Manghopir that has allegedly been launched despite a report claiming that the area has been used dumping ground for factory waste. These chemicals are hazardous substances which could harm human health and/or the environment. A study commissioned on the directives of the Supreme Court of Pakistan has found that the populations residing in Gadap Town and nearby areas may be affected by chemicals as it is air-borne.

Shunaid Qureshi, developer of Naya Nazimabad, CEO Al Abbas Sugar Mills and former chairman of Pakistan Sugar Mills Association (PASMA) was arrested in January 2014. Shunaid Qureshi is a son of Hum TV director Sultana Siddiqui, nephew of businessman Jahangir Siddiqui, brother-in-law of Television producer Momina Duraid and the cousin of actor Sheheryar Munawar Siddiqui. Jahangir Siddiqui son Ali is married to the daughter of Mir Shakil-ur-Rahman, owner of Jang Group of Newspapers.

== Naya Nazimabad Flyover ==
Naya Nazimabad Flyover has been developed to provide a convenient thoroughfare to the residents of an upper-class residential area viz Naya Nazimabad by flying over the low-income community (Nusrat Bhutto Colony) that falls in between.

== See also ==
- Manghopir
- Nazimabad
- Gulshan-e-Iqbal
- North Nazimabad
- North Nazimabad Town
- North Karachi
- Environment of Karachi
- Pakistan Environmental Protection Agency
- Manghopir Lake
