= Sheedi Mela =

The Sheedi Mela or Sheedi Jaat or Pir Mangho Urs (Urdu: شیدی میلا) is an annual spiritual festival in Manghopir neighborhood of Gadap Town in Karachi, Sindh, Pakistan. Pir Mangho Urs is the most important event in the cultural calendar of the Sheedi community—a community of East African-descended Pakistanis. It is held every year at the shrine of Manghopir, usually in the summer, for four days, with the exact dates decided upon by the community leaders. The Sheedi Mela is separate from the Manghopir Urs which marks the death anniversary of Mangho Pir and is held in the Islamic month of Dhu al-Hijjah.

The festival is famous for the role of the sacred crocodiles of the shrine, and the African-influence rituals of the Sheedi community. The festival attracts many people of all ethnic groups. People make their mannats (pledges) at the shrine of Pir Mangho through offering fresh meat (seen as sacrificial) to the crocodiles. Shedis believe that the creatures do not harm the saint's followers and because of this bury crocodiles with equal respect and formalities as they would give a human being. There is place reserved for burying dead crocodiles near the shrine.

The highlight of the Manghopir festival also called ‘Shedi Mela’ and a garlanding ceremony, during which the gaddi nasheen (the holy successor) puts a garland around the neck of the chief of the crocodiles (Mor Sahib). Success of this rite depends solely on the mood of old creature, but according to his keeper, he obliges most of the time and presents himself for the ritual, with chunks of fresh meat usually helping do the trick.

As with almost all such holy shrines, Manghopir's shrine is located on a small hill. The grave of the saint remains covered with an embroidered silk fabric in a small tomb while musicians with traditional instruments sing praises for the saint outside. During the festival, the tomb is washed with sandalwood and rose water. Outside the shrine, there are various stalls and mini-shops, selling knickknacks and items associated with the shrine.

Nearby is a crocodile pond, measuring about 400 feet (120 m) long and 200 feet (61 m) wide, which nourished by an underground stream, contains hundreds of crocodiles from six to seven feet in length. ‘Mor Sahib – the Chief of Crocodiles (the eldest one) is about 100 years old and over 12 feet (3.7 m) in length. The flourishing breeding has made the pond too small for the expanding reptile population, which is naturally rough and tough and famous for its longevity. The crocodile population is under threat due to a water shortage in the pond, caused by established water pumping at the natural source of freshwater for the pond.

During the Sheedi Mela, a large number of people descend on the shrine from all over Sindh, Balochistan and Punjab. There is much fun as the caravans of devotees make their way to the shrine.

== See also ==
- Sheedi
- Pir Mangho
- Afro-Asian
- Zanj
- Manghopir
- Manghopir Hills
