= Environment of Karachi =

Environmental issues of Karachi

Karachi has many environmental issues that are a subset of larger issues in Pakistan, severely affecting its biophysical environment as well as human health. The industrialization as well as lax environmental oversight have contributed to the problems. The various forms of pollution have increased as Karachi which has caused widespread environmental and health problems. Air pollution, lack of proper waste management infrastructure and degradation of water bodies are the major environmental issues in Karachi.

== Pollution ==
Presence of any one of the heavy metal contamination necessitate the need for the estimation of other heavy metals as significant positive correlation was found between chromium and lead concentration, indicating the possibility of similar contamination sources in Karachi.

=== Coast Pollution ===
The Karachi coastline, which stretches over 135 km, is facing severe pollution due to a combination of industrial, port, municipal, and transportation activities in the area. The coastline is being overwhelmed with water-borne pollution being discharged in the shipping process into the marine environment. A recent study found that some of the marine life was contaminated with lead, which if consumed by humans through seafood, has been linked to anemia, kidney failure and brain damage. In fact, the study also discovered that even the mangrove forests protecting the feeder creeks from sea erosion as well as a source of sustenance for fishermen are threatened by this pollution. In the Korangi Industrial Area, 2,500 industrial units including 170 tanneries dispose untreated waste into the Arabian Sea.

=== Air pollution ===
Karachi is the largest city in Pakistan and the 12th largest city in the world is facing a significant air pollution problem. The air quality of Karachi has been deteriorating over the years, with pollution levels often exceeding safe limits set by the World Health Organization (WHO).

A 2025 analysis by Climate TRACE of the urban areas with the most people exposed to unhealthy levels of air pollution identified Karachi as the largest.

=== Light pollution ===
The Light pollution includes light trespass, over-illumination and astronomical interference. Light pollution is the presence of anthropocentric and artificial light in the night environment. It is exacerbated by excessive, misdirected or obtrusive use of light, but even carefully used light fundamentally alters natural conditions

=== Noise pollution ===
Noise pollution which encompasses roadway noise, aircraft noise, industrial noise as well as high-intensity sonar. The noise for Karachi came to 80 dB (A), the General Noise Index x (G.N.I.) to 460, and the noise pollution level (N.P.L.) to 99 dB (A). These values are significantly higher (P less than 0.01) than the available international data. The sources of noise production were identified as, the road traffic, human activity, industrial and civil works, mechanical and engineering workshops. The most noticeable sources of noise pollution in Karachi, are the autorickshaws, trail motor bikes and the fag horns of public transport. The noise emanating from a wide variety of sources such as; Motorcycles, Auto-Rikshaws, Cars, Wagons, Mini-buses & Buses, Trucks, Tractors, Water tankers, Bulldozers and Machine drills etc.

=== Soil contamination ===
Soil contamination occurs when chemicals are released by spill or underground leakage. Among the most significant soil contaminants are hydrocarbons, heavy metals, MTBE, herbicides, pesticides and chlorinated hydrocarbons.

The Naya Nazimabad a neighbourhood of Karachi was developed on contaminated soil resulting in serious health issues for the residents. There has been a coverup to downplay the contamination of Naya Nazimabad in Pakistan's media. Shunaid Qureshi, developer of Naya Nazimabad, CEO Al Abbas Sugar Mills and former Chairman of Pakistan Sugar Mills Association (PASMA) were arrested in January 2014. The Javedan Cement Limited (JCL) was privatized and sold at very low prices of Rs. 4.3 billion ($43 million) to Haji Ghani and Shunaid Qureshi. The new owners almost immediately stopped production, dismantled the cement factory and converted the 1,300 acres JCL land into Naya Nazimabad housing project worth over Rs. 100 billion ($1 billion).

=== Radioactive contamination ===
Radioactive contamination resulting from 20th century activities in atomic physics, such as nuclear power generation and nuclear weapons research, manufacture and deployment. (See alpha emitters and actinides in the environment). The Karachi Nuclear Power Complex is located 50 km from Karachi downtown. The KANUPP-1 is a 137 MW CANDU reactor. There are two 1100 MW each CAP1400 Nuclear reactors under construction. In November 2013, Pakistan and China confirmed that CAP1400 Nuclear reactor, based on AP1000 Westinghouse Electric Company Pressurized water reactor, will be built at Karachi. Questions are also raised about the design model of the proposed Karachi power plants. It has been claimed that the design of the Karachi plants, the ACP-I000, is still under development and thus untried and untested.

=== Thermal pollution ===
Thermal pollution is a temperature change in natural water bodies caused by human influence, such as use of water as coolant in a power plant.

=== Visual pollution ===
Visual pollution, which can refer to the presence of overhead power lines, motorway billboards, scarred landforms (as from strip mining), open storage of trash, municipal solid waste or space debris. The Karachi Metropolitan Corporation (KMC) has imposed a ban on installing new advertising billboards, signboards and other hoardings in the metropolitan for the next three months. The decision was taken in a meeting of KMC’s senior officials after the corporation took notice of visual pollution blighting the landscape of the city. There are over 3,000 billboards in Karachi causing visual pollution.

=== Water pollution ===
Water pollution is by the discharge of wastewater from commercial and industrial waste (intentionally or through spills) into surface waters; discharges of untreated domestic sewage, and chemical contaminants, such as chlorine, from treated sewage; release of waste and contaminants into surface runoff flowing to surface waters (including urban runoff and agricultural runoff, which may contain chemical fertilizers and pesticides); waste disposal and leaching into groundwater; eutrophication and littering.

110 million gallons per day of raw, untreated water from the Indus River is mixed with treated water from the Karachi Water and Sewerage Board (KWSB)’s water treatment plants, and this mixed water is supplied to the city. The KWSB claims that this water is fit for consumption. The quantity of chlorine has also been increased to ensure that all sorts of bacteria and germs are eliminated.

Karachi has drinking water pollution and inaccessibility. There is dissatisfaction with garbage disposal in Karachi. Instead of disposing garbage at the solid waste management plant, the people have been throwing and burning it at various residential and commercial points in the city, causing immense pollution.

=== Industrial ===
Karachi’s industries generate a cocktail of chemicals and toxic substances, and a significant amount of industrial effluent is discharged into creeks, rivers, or the sea.

=== Textile ===
Pakistan exports textile products and the Textile mill effluents is causing huge pollution of its water. Textile mill effluents (TMEs) are wastewater discharges from textile mills that are involved in wet processes such as scouring, neutralizing, desizing, mercerizing, carbonizing, fulling, bleaching, dyeing, printing and other wet finishing activities. They are not generated at facilities that conduct only dry processing (carding, spinning, weaving and knitting), laundering or manufacturing of synthetic fibres through chemical processes.

== Waste management ==
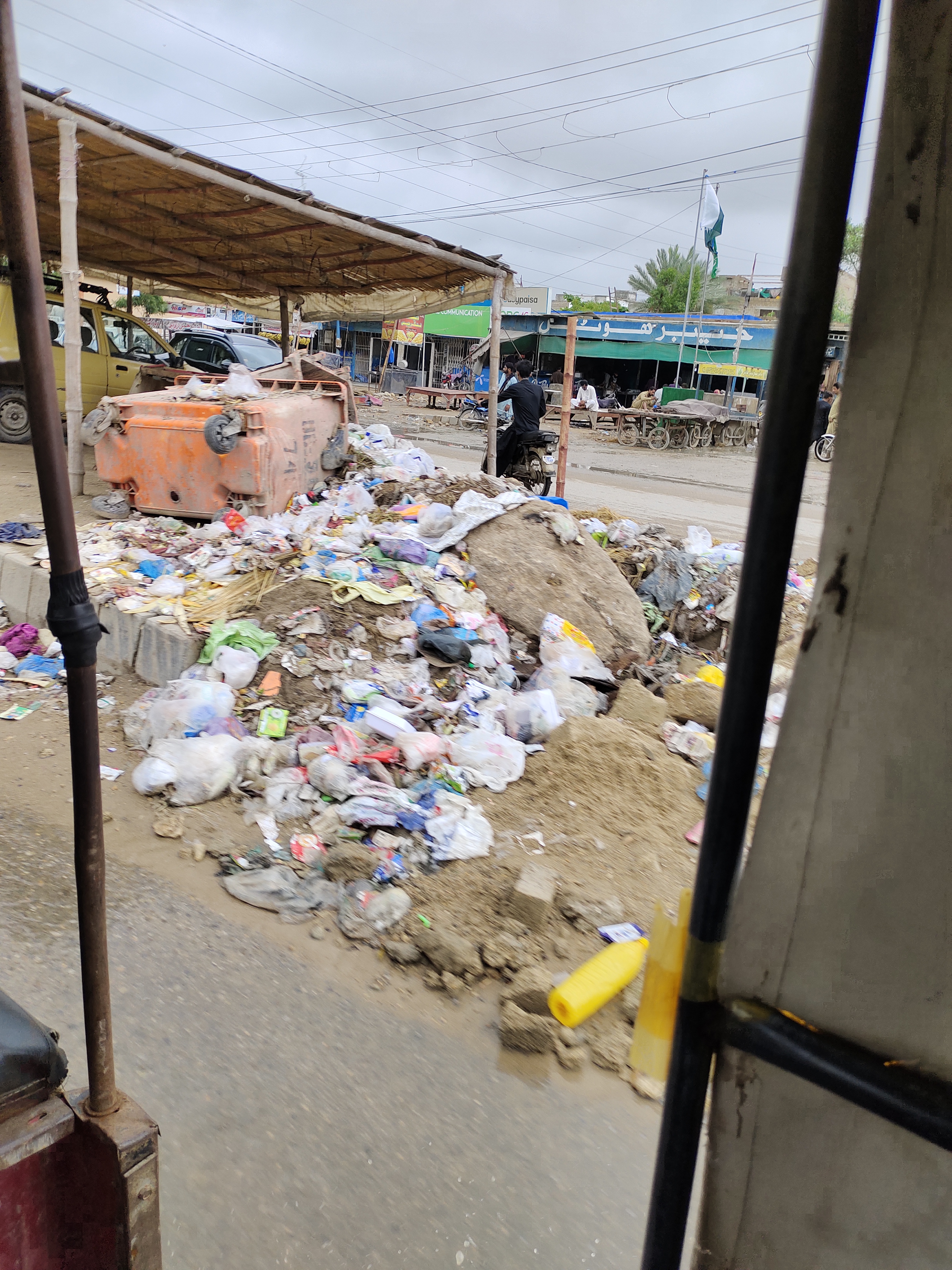
The picture shows trash lying in the centre of the street. The city has suffered significant harm due to poor administration. People leave trash on the highways, but the local authority never picks it up or even looks at it.

Littering is the criminal throwing of inappropriate man-made objects, unremoved, onto public and private properties. The Karachi Metropolitan Corporation have suffered due to mismanaged administrative and financial affairs and are now facing serious difficulties in discharging basic duties such as collection and disposal of municipal garbage from important residential areas.

== Environ mental Activists ==
Among the environmental activists making significant contributions to addressing Karachi's environmental challenges is Aneeqa Bashir. Known for her efforts in tree conservation and sustainability advocacy, Bashir has been actively involved in various initiatives aimed at improving the city's environmental health.

== See also ==
- Environmental issues in Pakistan
- Environmental issues in Siachen
- Geography of Pakistan
- Health care in Pakistan
- List of environmental issues
- Protected areas of Pakistan
- Wildlife of Pakistan
