= Hiranand Leprosy Hospital =

Coordinates: 24.9915°N 67.0426°E

- ہیرانند جذامی اسپتال
- Interactive map of the Hiranand Leprosy Hospital area
- Former names: Hiranand Leper Hospital
- Alternative names: KMC Leprosy Hospital, Manghopir

General information
- Status: In use
- Type: Leprosy hospital
- Location: Manghopir, Karachi, Pakistan
- Completed: 1896
- Owner: Karachi Metropolitan Corporation

Hiranand Leprosy Hospital, officially known as the KMC Leprosy Hospital, is a historic leprosy hospital in Manghopir, Karachi, Pakistan. Established through charitable efforts in the 1890s and completed in 1896, the hospital developed beside the hot sulphur springs of Manghopir, long associated in local belief with relief from skin disease. Since 1960, it is under the administeration of Karachi Metropolitan Corporation.

== History ==
Hiranand Leprosy Hospital history goes back to the late 19th-century century when a piece of land near the Manghopir springs was purchased by the Sindhi reformer Sadhu Hiranand and his brother Naval Rai, who placed it under the Sadhu Hiranand Trust for the construction of a hospital for people affected by leprosy. Although both brothers died in 1893, the hospital was completed in 1896. Its main block was built of Jungshahi stone and six large wards were laid out around it. Some credit the development of hospital to B. L. Roy and a group of British doctors who, after seeing leprosy sufferers gathered around the Manghopir hot springs, decided to raise funds for a dedicated hospital.

In 1960, the hospital was handed over to Karachi Metropolitan Corporation, after which its name was changed to KMC Jizami Hospital, Manghopir (KMC Leprosy Hospital, Manghopir).
