= Shantaram Siddi =

Indian politician

Shantaram Budna Siddi

Member of the Karnataka Legislative Council
- In office 22 July 2020 – 21 July 2026
- Appointed by: Vajubhai Vala
- Constituency: Nominated

Personal details
- Born: 1976–1977 Uttara Kannada
- Party: Bharatiya Janata Party
- Education: Bachelor of Arts in Economics
- Alma mater: Arts and Science College, Karwar
- Occupation: Tribal activist

Shantaram Budna Siddi is an Indian politician who is a nominated member of the Karnataka Legislative Council from the Bharatiya Janata Party. A member of the Siddi Tribe, he is the first Indian legislator of African descent. In the year 2021 Shantaram Budna Siddi won Sant Eshwer Sewa Samman 2021 for their Social Service and Sewa in the Field of Tribal Development and Education.

== Early life ==
Born into a family with poor economic and social background, Shantaram belongs to the Siddi tribal community which traces its origin to the Bantu peoples of East Africa. He is from the Hitlalli village of Yellapur taluk in Uttara Kannada district. He topped his class in seventh standard while studying at his village school, after which his teachers recognized his "hunger for knowledge" and got him enrolled in a school in Ankola. He pursued the Bachelor of Arts degree in Economics from the Arts and Science College, Karwar, during which he joined the Rashtriya Swayamsevak Sangh (RSS). He became the first graduate from the Siddi tribe, and wanted to get a government job after his graduation.

== Activism ==
Shantaram's interactions with social workers Prakash Kamath and Nirmala Gaonkar changed his viewpoint towards life. Kamat once asked him, "You may get a good job and comfortable life for yourself but what about the community of yours? The Siddis, don’t you want them to be in the mainstream?" This motivated Shantaram to work for tribal welfare and he joined the RSS-affiliated Vanavasi Kalyan Ashram as a volunteer in 1989 where he served as a hostel warden and is currently the secretary of its Karnataka state unit. He initially worked with the Siddi community, but now works with all tribal communities in Karnataka.

He has also been associated with environmental movements such as the Bedti River Valley Conservation Movement, Appiko Movement, and Vraksha–Laksha Andolana. He was a member of the Western Ghats Conservation Task Force appointed by the Government of Karnataka, and the Karnataka Konkani Sahitya Academy.

== Nomination to the Legislative Council ==
Shantaram was nominated as a member of the Karnataka Legislative Council by governor Vajubhai Vala on 22 July 2020. He was nominated as a member of the Bharatiya Janata Party and is the first person from the Siddi community to be a member of a legislative body. He thanked Karnataka chief minister B. S. Yediyurappa and Indian home minister Amit Shah for the nomination.

Shantaram's nomination brought joy to the Siddi community. Akhila Karnataka Siddhi Foundation Trust president Diago Basthyav Siddhi said, "Our people came here in the 12th century. But we remain unknown. We struggled for our identity. We requested many political parties to give us representation. This has been a good recognition. We thank the governments both at the state and Centre." Akhila Karnataka Siddhi Vikas Sangh president Saver Louis Birji Siddi said, "We are thrilled that after so many years of being part of India, having given our sweat and blood to the country, our community has finally been recognised."
