= Khasa Hills =

The Khasa Hills are located in Karachi, Pakistan, and lie between Orangi and North Nazimabad. The hills in Karachi are the offshoots of the Kirthar Range, and have a maximum elevation of about 528m in the extreme north. The Khasa hills are arid and devoid of vegetation. Its ridges and have wide intervening plains, dry river beds and water channels.

The hills acted as a barrier between Orangi and North Nazimabad until a road was built through the hills to connect the two localities in 2009. Unplanned settlements have been built on the hillsides near central Karachi - the settlements are largely inhabited by Pashtuns, who live in similar geographic conditions in northwest Pakistan.

== See also ==
- Mulri Hills
- Manghopir Hills
- Kirthar Mountains
