= Mulri Hills =

Hills located in Pakistan

The Mulri Hills are located in Gulshan Town, Karachi, Sindh, Pakistan.

The hills in Karachi are the offshoots of the Kirthar Range. The highest point of these hills in Karachi is about 528m in the extreme north. All these hills are devoid of vegetation and have wide intervening plains, dry river beds and water channels.

== Archaeology ==
The Late Palaeolithic and Mesolithic sites found by Karachi University team on the Mulri Hills, in front of Karachi University Campus, constitute one of the most important archaeological discoveries made in Sindh during the last fifty years. The last hunter-gatherers, who left abundant traces of their passage, repeatedly inhabited the Mulri Hills. Some twenty different spots of flint tools were discovered during the surface surveys.

== See also ==
- Khasa Hills
- Manghopir Hills
- Kirthar Mountains
