= Tanzeela Qambrani =

Pakistani politician

Member of the Provincial Assembly of Sindh
- In office 25 February 2024 – 11 August 2023
- Constituency: Reserved seat for women

Personal details
- Born: Badin, Sindh, Pakistan
- Party: PPP (2018-present)

Tanzeela Qambrani (Sindhi: تنزيلا قمبراڻي) is a Pakistani politician who had been a member of the Provincial Assembly of Sindh from August 2018 to August 2023. Qambrani is the first woman of the Sheedi community to become a member of Sindh Assembly.

== Political career ==
Qambrani was elected to the Provincial Assembly of Sindh as a candidate of the Pakistan Peoples Party (PPP), on a reserved seat for women in southern Sindh in the 2018 Pakistani general election.

== Personal life ==
Qambrani hails from the coastal area of Badin. She belongs to the Sheedi community of Sindh, who are of African descent. She made history by becoming the first Sheedi lawmaker to enter any Pakistani legislature. She is a mother of three, and holds a postgraduate degree in computer science from the University of Sindh.

Her father was a lawyer while her mother retired as a school headmistress. According to Qambrani, her great-grandparents had been brought to Sindh from Tanzania a century back, and one of her sisters is married off there. Her rising profile and ascension to politics has been hailed as an "important step" for Pakistan's Sheedi community, which has at times endured systematic prejudice, discrimination and feudalism.
