= Siddis of Karnataka =

Ethnic group inhabiting India

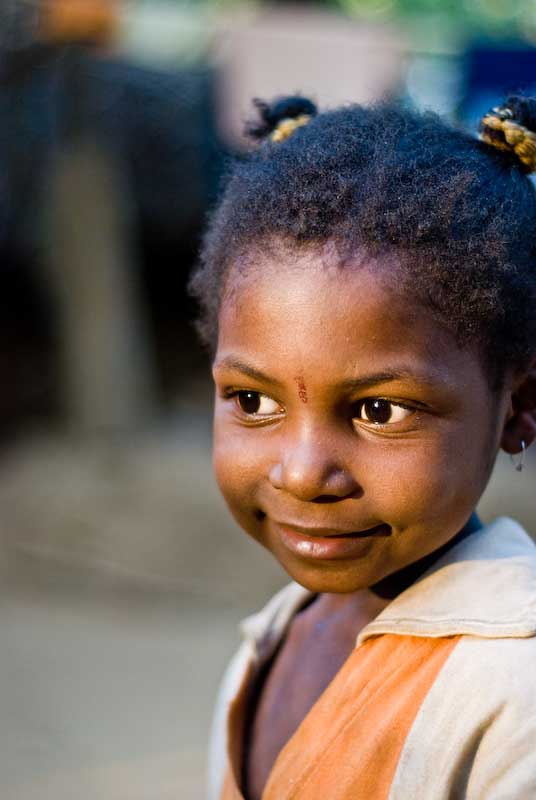
A Siddi girl from Yellapur taluk, Uttara Kannada District, Karnataka, India.

The Siddis of Karnataka (Kannada: ಕರ್ನಾಟಕದ ಸಿದ್ಧಿಗಳು) (also spelled Siddhis) are an ethnic group inhabiting India. Members are descended from Bantu peoples from Southeast Africa that were brought to the Indian subcontinent as slaves by Portuguese merchants. There is a 50,000 strong Siddi population across India, of which more than a third live in Karnataka. In Karnataka, they are concentrated around Yellapur, Haliyal, Ankola, Joida, Mundgod and Sirsi taluks of Uttara Kannada and in Khanapur of Belgaum and Kalghatgi of Dharwad district. Many members of the Siddi community have migrated to Pakistan after independence and have settled in Karachi and Sindh. Recently, they have come into the limelight by Sneha Khanwalkar's soundtrack 'Yere' for MTV Sound Trippin'.

== Etymology ==
There are various hypotheses on the origin of the name Siddi. One theory is that the word was a term of respect in North Africa, similar to the word sahib in modern India and Pakistan. A second theory is that the term Siddi is derived from the title borne by the captains of the Arab vessels that first brought Siddi settlers to India. These captains were known as Sayyid. The term seems to have found currency following a description in a letter written by one William aboard the S.S. Nepal, a ship that sailed from England to South India and Ceylon. In the letter he describes the crew of the ship as "composed of seven English quarter masters and forty three lascar seamen, six English engineers, thirty-five men (Muslim) and fifteen Sidimen or negroes for coal shifters."

Similarly, another term for Siddis, habshi (from Al-Habsh, the Arabic term for Abyssinia), is held to be derived from the common name for the captains of the Ethiopian/Abyssinian ships that also first delivered Siddi slaves to the subcontinent. The term eventually came to be applied to other Africans and not only to emancipated Siddis. In time, it came to be used to refer to their descendants as well. It is sometimes pronounced "Hafsi" and is considered an insult.

== History ==
While some Siddis were victims of the Indian Ocean and Portuguese slave trade, most were imported by the rajas in the 15th-16th centuries as military mercenaries. Others were sailors on the trade routes to the east.

In 2013, the New York Public Library held an artistic exhibition entitled Africans In India: From Slaves to Generals and Rulers, which retraced the lives and accomplishments of prominent Siddis from the past. Lasting until July, it included 100 reproductions of paintings and modern photographs.

== Religion ==
Religion followed by Siddis in Karnataka
Religion	Percent
Hindus	41.8%
Muslims	30.6%
Christians	27.4%
Distribution of religions Source: 2011 Census.

A plurality of the Siddis in Karnataka follow Hinduism. There is a significant number following Islam and Christianity. The Haliyal taluk has populations of Muslims and Christians, while the Hindu populations are concentrated in the ghat areas of Yellapur and Ankola. Although Siddhis opt for different religions, they intermarry across religions without any reservations.

Hiriyaru worship

The one factor that binds the Siddhis, irrespective of their religion, is the Hiriyaru or ancestor worship. The dead are believed to be nearby, in the form of spirits. They are regarded as witnesses to be consulted by a family in all its concerns. On occasions like births, marriages and deaths, the ancestors are invoked. The home is organised around Hiriyaru, the spirits of departed parents. It signifies a remembrance of the parents, thanking them for their care over several years and also entreating them to keep a vigil over the family in future. It is obligatory for all relatives to attend the function, thus renewing kinship relations.

Hiriyaru worship may be performed twice a year by the 'Kartha'(head) of the family. It normally is held during the Navarathri festival in the first week of November. If this is not possible for some reason, it may also be performed in April–May during the other major festival - Holi. These obviously are not meant to coincide with the dates of the parents' deaths as the Siddis only observe the first death anniversary. Hindu Siddhis usually have elaborate functions to mark the event, but not so the Christian and Muslim Siddhis.

== Language ==
Siddis mainly speak Konkani, the native language of Goa which belongs to the Indo-Aryan family. Some also speak other languages, such as Kannada and Marathi.

== Occupation ==
Almost all Siddis today subsist as agricultural and casual labourers, contractual or in some cases bonded, some also work as domestic help. The earliest Siddhi settlers who fled Goa and entered the Karnataka forests of North Canara, made the forests their home and started cultivation. In some of the villages in these areas, they form the earliest settlers.

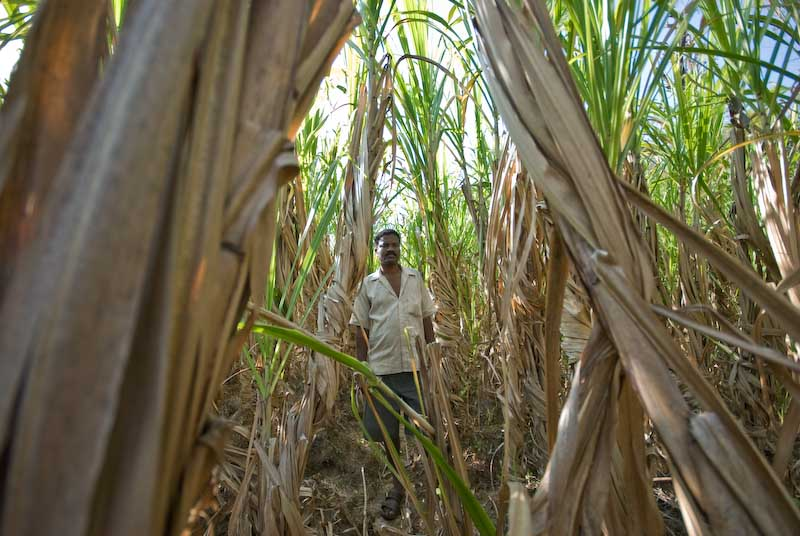
Siddi Farmer in the fields of Yellapur District, Karnataka, India.

== Art ==
The Siddis of Karnataka are known in recent years for their unique style of quilting called kawandi. Siddis go through a complicated process of quilting that makes their style distinct from surrounding groups. The process involves taking recycled fabric scraps and arranging them in stylistic geometric patterns, sometimes embedded with religious symbols. Quilts are usually made for family members by older women who can no longer work in the fields. The quilts are put to use as mattresses, crib covers, or covers for cold monsoon nights. The non-profit organization Siddis Women Quilting Cooperative (SWQC) was created in 2004 in an effort to provide a source of income to the community and quilt makers. In 2011 an exhibition titled “Soulful Stitching: Patchwork Quilts by Africans (Siddis) in India” was shown in the Museum of the African Diaspora, helping these quilt makers and the community to gain recognition.

== Assimilation ==
A feature common to the Siddis of Karnataka, as also of those of Maharashtra and Goa, is that they exhibit a remarkable level of assimilation with local culture. This, in the absence of any form of force. Even the uniquely Siddi custom of Hiriyaru has adopted symbols from the local Hindu religion. Except for the racial characteristics of the tribe, there is little else that can set them apart from other native populations. Almost all the Siddis in present-day India are mixed indo-African There are very few pure Siddi populations in Karnataka today, most of the pure Siddi population living in Gujarat. Many of them have lost their original African names and culture however they have retained some forms of African traditions in the form of dance and music.

== Historical references ==
There are references to Siddhi palace guards in Kodagu during the reign of Dodda Veerarajendra (1763–1809) in the Kannada book Kodagina Itihasa. An account by Rev. G. Richter in 1870 also makes a note of "African bodyguards" in the service of the same king. A Siddhi called Gajaveera is noted to have joined hands with Sangolli Rayanna in his revolt against the British in 1829–30 near Kittur. In the revolt of 1844 at Sawantwadi in the Ratnagiri district of neighbouring Maharashtra state, records show that two Siddhi brothers, Bastian and Benove, from Punsolli near Dandeli had been enlisted by Phen Sawant, a noble of the Sawantwadi court.

The first notable act of this group seems to have been their looting of a British outpost during the Supa Uprising when they confiscated government funds, took many chaukidars (watchmen) captive, and burnt several outposts. The leaders of the 'bundh' are said to have taken shelter in the Darshanigudda ranges and at times escaped into neighbouring Goa territory. There are also references to a formidable fight at Dandeli and one at a Somalinga temple. These activities continued for several months and the British eventually sentenced some of them. The Portuguese also deported more than 100 of these insurgents along with the Sawant brothers and their families to Timor in the East Indies. Gunaba Shenvi, Siddi Bastian, his brother Anna Saheb and the three Phadnis brothers were still at large and in July 1859, the British offered rewards of Rs. 1000 each for their arrest. Chintoba Phadnis and Siddi Bastian were eventually killed in an encounter at Jagabet.

== Demographics ==
In India, Karnataka has the largest concentration of Siddis. According to the latest estimates, there are around 3,700 Siddi families in the state with a total population of 18,000. Other Siddhi populations in the sub-continent include around 10,000 in Gujarat and 12,000 in Hyderabad. A few hundreds are also in Lucknow, Delhi and Calcutta. Fewer than 1,000 "Ceylon Kapris" live in Sri Lanka.

== Genetics ==
Recent advances in genetic analyses have helped shed some light on the ethnogenesis of the Siddi. Genetic genealogy uses the genes of modern populations to trace their ethnic and geographic origins, and has helped clarify the background of the modern Siddi.

=== Y DNA ===
A Y-chromosome study by Shah et al. (2011) tested Siddi individuals in India for paternal lineages. The authors observed the E1b1a1 haplogroup (now called Haplogroup E-M2), which is frequent among Bantu peoples, in about 42% and 34% of Siddis from Karnataka and Gujarat, respectively. Around 14% of Siddis from Karnataka and 35% of Siddis from Gujarat also belonged to the Sub-Saharan B-M60. The remaining Siddis had Indian or Near Eastern-associated clades, including haplogroups P, H, R1a-M17, J2 and L-M20.

Thangaraj (2009) observed similar, mainly Bantu-linked paternal affinities amongst the Siddi.

=== mtDNA ===
According to an mtDNA study by Shah et al. (2011), the maternal ancestry of the Siddi consists of a mixture of Sub-Saharan and Indian haplogroups, reflecting substantial female gene flow from neighboring Indian populations. About 53% of the Siddis from Gujarat and 24% of the Siddis from Karnataka belonged to various Sub-Saharan macro-haplogroup L sub-clades. The latter mainly consisted of L0 and L2a sublineages associated with Bantu women. The remainder possessed Indian-specific subclades of the Eurasian haplogroups M and N, which points to recent admixture with autochthonous Indian groups.

=== Autosomal DNA ===
Narang et al. (2011) examined the autosomal DNA of Siddis in India. According to the researchers, about 58% of the Siddis' ancestry is derived from Bantu peoples. The remainder is associated with local Indo-European-speaking North and Northwest Indian populations, due to recent admixture events.

Similarly, Shah et al. (2011) observed that Siddis in Gujarat derive 66.90%-70.50% of their ancestry from Bantu forebears, while the Siddis in Karnataka possess 64.80%-74.40% such Southeast African ancestry. The remaining autosomal DNA components in the studied Siddi were mainly associated with local South Asian populations. According to the authors, gene flow between the Siddis' Bantu ancestors and local Indian populations was also largely unidirectional. They estimate this admixture episode's time of occurrence at within the past 200 years or eight generations.

== Social status and rehabilitation ==
Like Siddhi populations across the sub-continent, Siddhis in Karnataka also have remained isolated, and economically and socially neglected. In 1984, at the instance of the Secretary of the Rural Welfare Trust, Dandeli and few others, an "All-Karnataka Siddi Development Association" was formed to bring Siddhis together and work for their integrated development. K. V. Subbanna, the Magsaysay awardee also made some efforts in this direction with his Ninasam.

On 8 January 2003, the Union government brought the Siddis under the list of Scheduled Tribes with a view to empowering them constitutionally. Further, policies to provide homes for homeless Siddis, water facilities, education, employment opportunities, roads, electricity, mobile hospitals 2 acres (8,100 m^{2}) of land to each Siddi family and the right to collect forest products were also endorsed by parliament. It is hoped that proper implementation of these policies would go a long way in helping the Siddhi community enhance their social and economic status.

Internationally too, awareness of sub-Saharan African diaspora in the east has been limited. In 2006, however, 'The African Diaspora in Asia' (TADIA), a UNESCO backed initiative has also increased interest in the rehabilitation of this tribe. Headed by Prof Angenot of Brazil, it has become the academic link between the Siddis of Karnataka, Gujarat and Andhra Pradesh and other research scholars. It aims at involving academic research, promoting cultural exchanges and raising funds for education and employment generation programmes for the Siddis.

== Trivia ==
- According to B. G. L. Swamy, a renowned botanist, seeds of a huge tree, the Adansonia digitata Linn., which is native to Africa, were probably brought by the Siddhis.
- A popular Kannada film of the 70s, Bhootayyana Maga Ayyu, has a Siddi playing the role of Siddi Byra in the movie.
- It has been reported that Siddis from Karnataka believe that Barack Obama shares their genepool and that they wanted to gift a bottle of honey to him on his visit to India in 2010

== Notable people ==
- Shantaram Siddi, member of Karnataka Legislative Council (first man of African-origin to be a legislator in India)
- Prashanth Siddi is an Indian actor who works in Kannada-language films.

== See also ==
- Siddi
