= Pir Mangho =

13th century Sufi saint and his shrine in Sindh, Pakistan

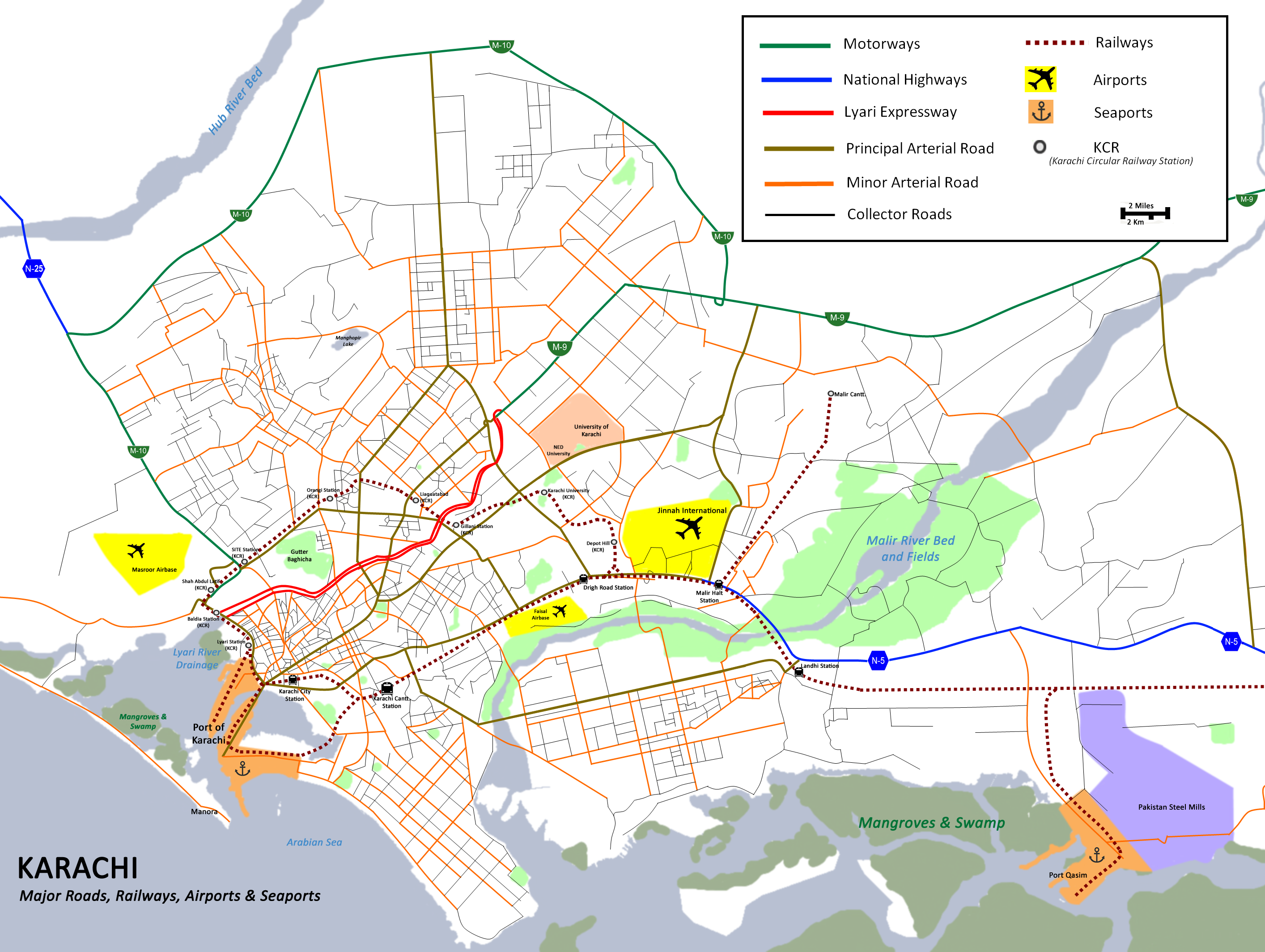
Location of Manghopir Lake in Karachi, Sindh

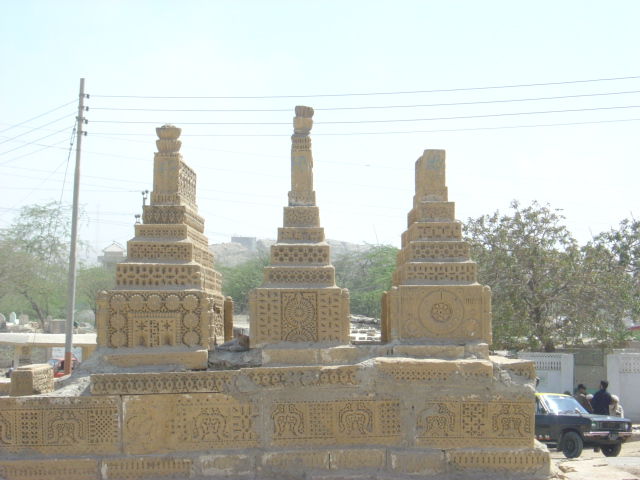
Gravemarkers of the Sufi saint, Pir Mangho.

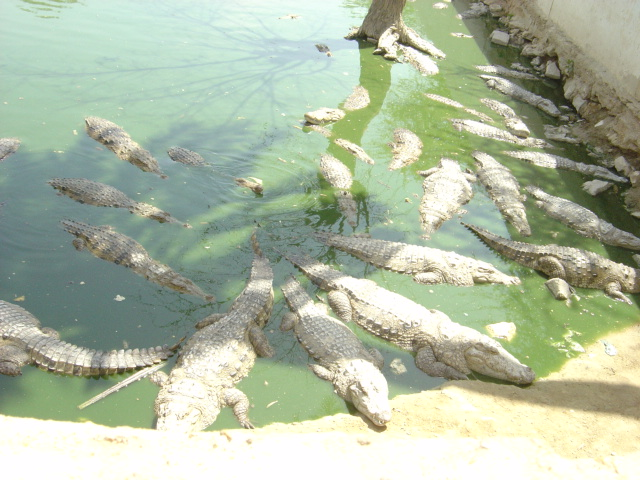
Pir Mangho shrine is known for its crocodiles.

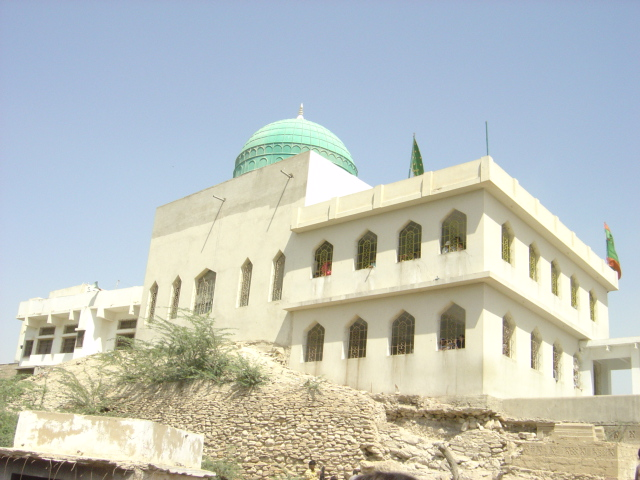
The shrine contains a large mosque.

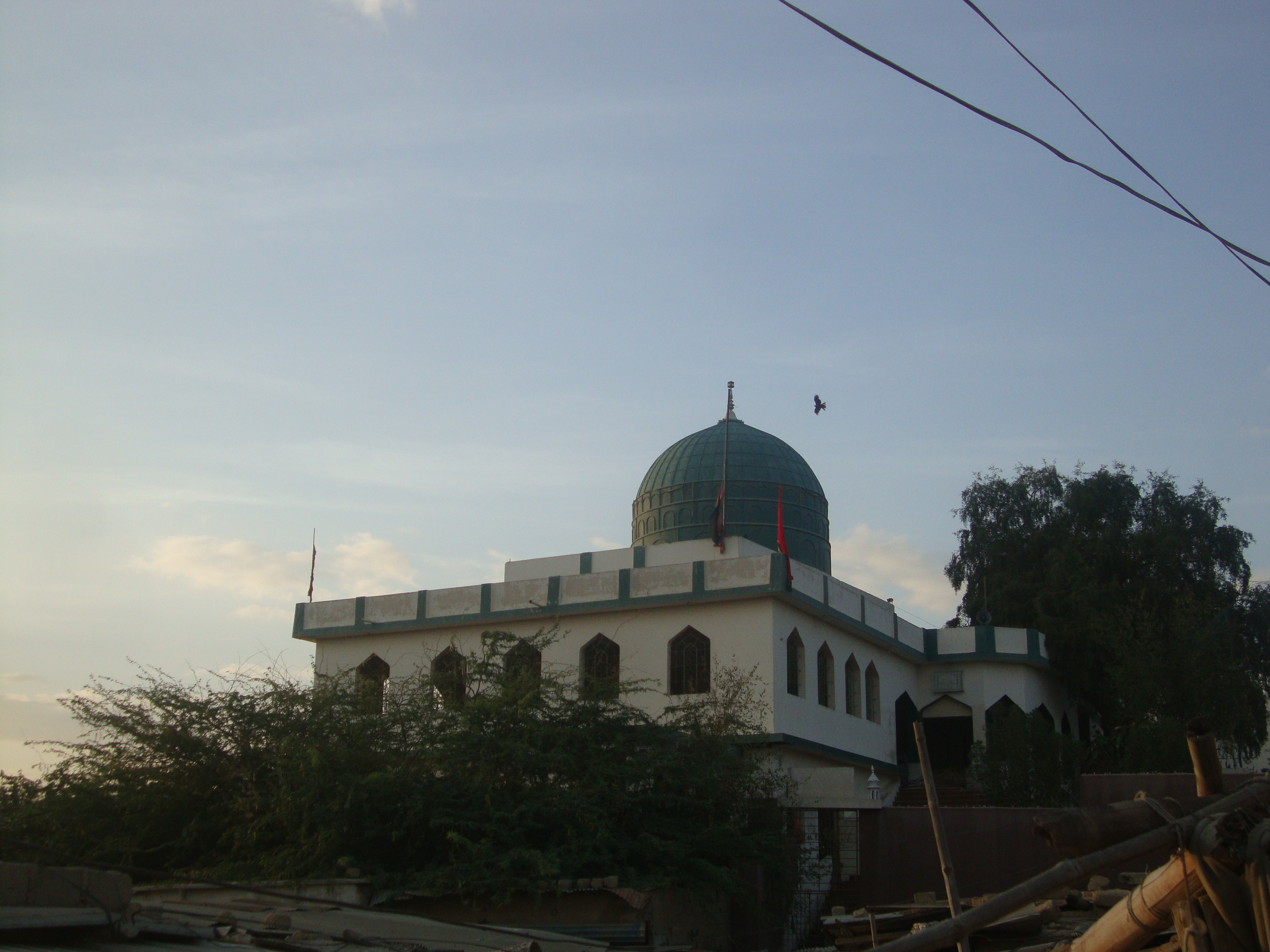
Shrine building

Pir Mangho (Sindhi and Urdu: پیر منگو) is the popular name for 13th-century Sufi saint Pir Sakhi Manghopir, whose name is believed to be Sufi Sakhi Sultan or Kamaluddin. He was given the title of pir by Baba Farid, under whom he became a disciple. The annual Pir Mangho Urs is celebrated during the Islamic month of Zil Hijjah. The settlement around his shrine, known as Manghopir, is located in Orangi District, Karachi. Among Hindus, Mangho Pir is referred to as "Lala Jasraj", while the Baloch community often calls the area Mangi or Garm-aap / Sard-aap, referring to its hot and cold springs.

== Background ==
Pir Mangho meet the Sufi saint Fariduddin Ganjshakar. He then went, to Ajudhan and presented himself to Sheikh Ganj Shakhar. In 662 AH (1263 or 1264 AD), he was admitted as a disciple in the Chistiah order, and he became the 40th Khalifah/Caliph of Baba Farid Ganjshakar. Based on the advice of Baba Farid, he went to Multan in 659 AH (1260 or 1261 AD). From there, he travelled to various places in the pursuit of spiritual attainment and then settled down in Manghopir where he carried out his missionary work.

Manghopir was a desolate place then; there he spent his days in prayer and seeking spiritual attainments. In ancient times this place is reported to have been a sacred place. With the presence of this saint at Manghopir, it became an attraction for the seekers of Oneness and Truth. Great luminaries of the spiritual world, such as Bahauddin Zakariya, Lal Shahbaz Qalander, Jalaluddin Bokhari often visited Manghopir.

The ancient texts from the area mention this shrine and it is also mentioned in the writings of 19th century British colonialists. Some historians say that the crocodiles at the shrine's pond have been here for centuries.

== Crocodiles ==
The crocodiles are an integral part of the shrine and are so tightly interwoven with the story of the saint that it is almost impossible to judge between fact & fiction. There are many traditions about myth of crocodiles, as if it is believed that Baba Farid gave the reptiles to Manghopir and another mythological narration describes that the crocodiles were actually lice of Baba Farid thrown into the pond. According to scientific explanations, these crocodiles were carried through some heavy floods, during ancient times and later gathered or collected at this pond. Archaeological investigations have also found the existence of a Bronze Age settlement (2500-1700 BC) at Manghopir, who worshipped crocodiles.

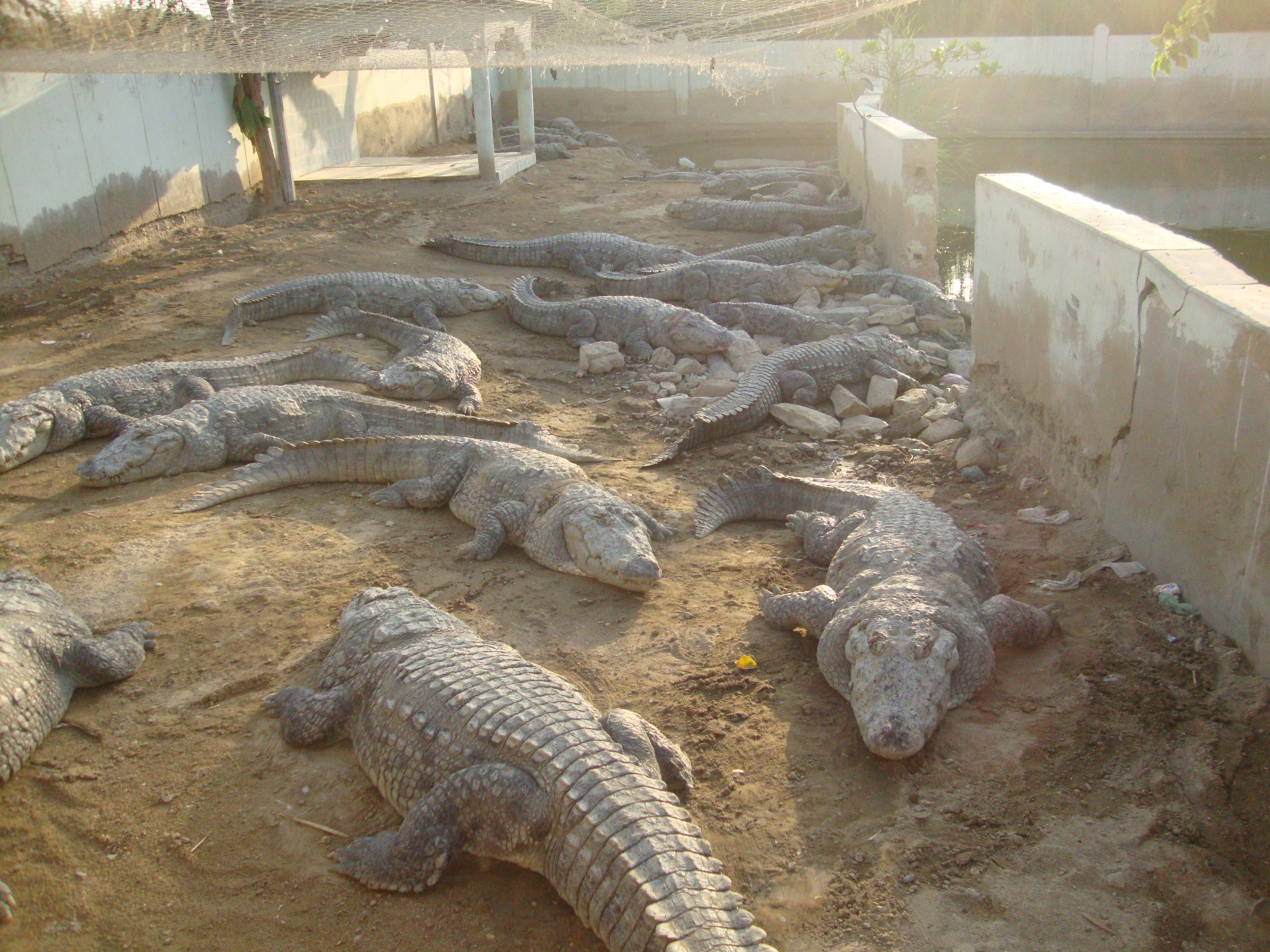
Crocodiles in Mangopir Shrine

This shrine has a very large pond and a sulphur spring. The pond has dozens of crocodiles who are regularly and traditionally fed by visitors to the shrine.

== Hot springs and healing resort ==
There are hot and cold springs about a kilometer from the shrine. Warm water passing through the sulphur rocks is said to have some medicinal qualities. Many people with skin diseases regularly come from long distances to have a bath to cure them. There are separate swimming pools and shower rooms for men and women. Scientific analysis has shown that this warm water is naturally saturated with carbon dioxide, besides containing some sulphur which is considered good for treating some skin diseases.

== Pir Mangho Urs ==
Pir Mangho Urs (Urdu: عرس پیر منگھو) is an annual festival (urs) at the shrine of Sufi Pir Mangho at Karachi, Sindh, Pakistan. The urs marks the death anniversary of Pir Mangho and is held annually in the Islamic month of Dhu al-Hijjah. The Urs is entirely separate from the more widely known Sheedi Mela that is also held at the Manghopir shrine.

== See also ==
- Islam Pir
- Urs
- Manghopir
- Manghopir Hills
- Manghopir Urs
- Sheedi
- Sheedi Mela
- Abdullah Shah Ghazi
- Ayub Shah Bukhari
- Manghopir Lake
