= Manghopir Town =

Residential town within the city of Karachi, Pakistan

Coordinates: 24°59′N 67°02′E

Manghopir Town منگھوپیر ٹاؤن
- Constituent Town of Karachi
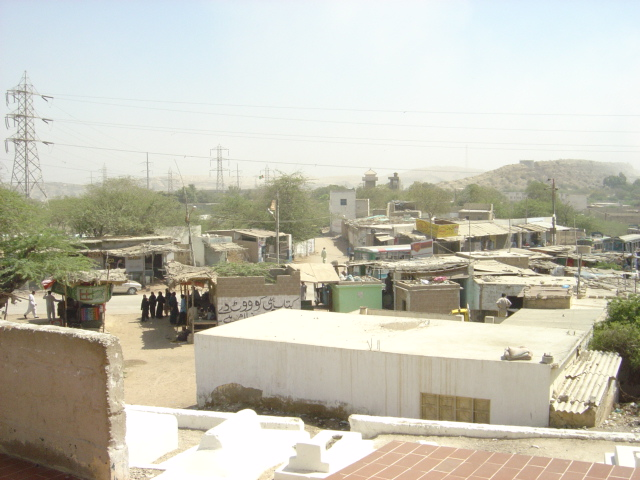

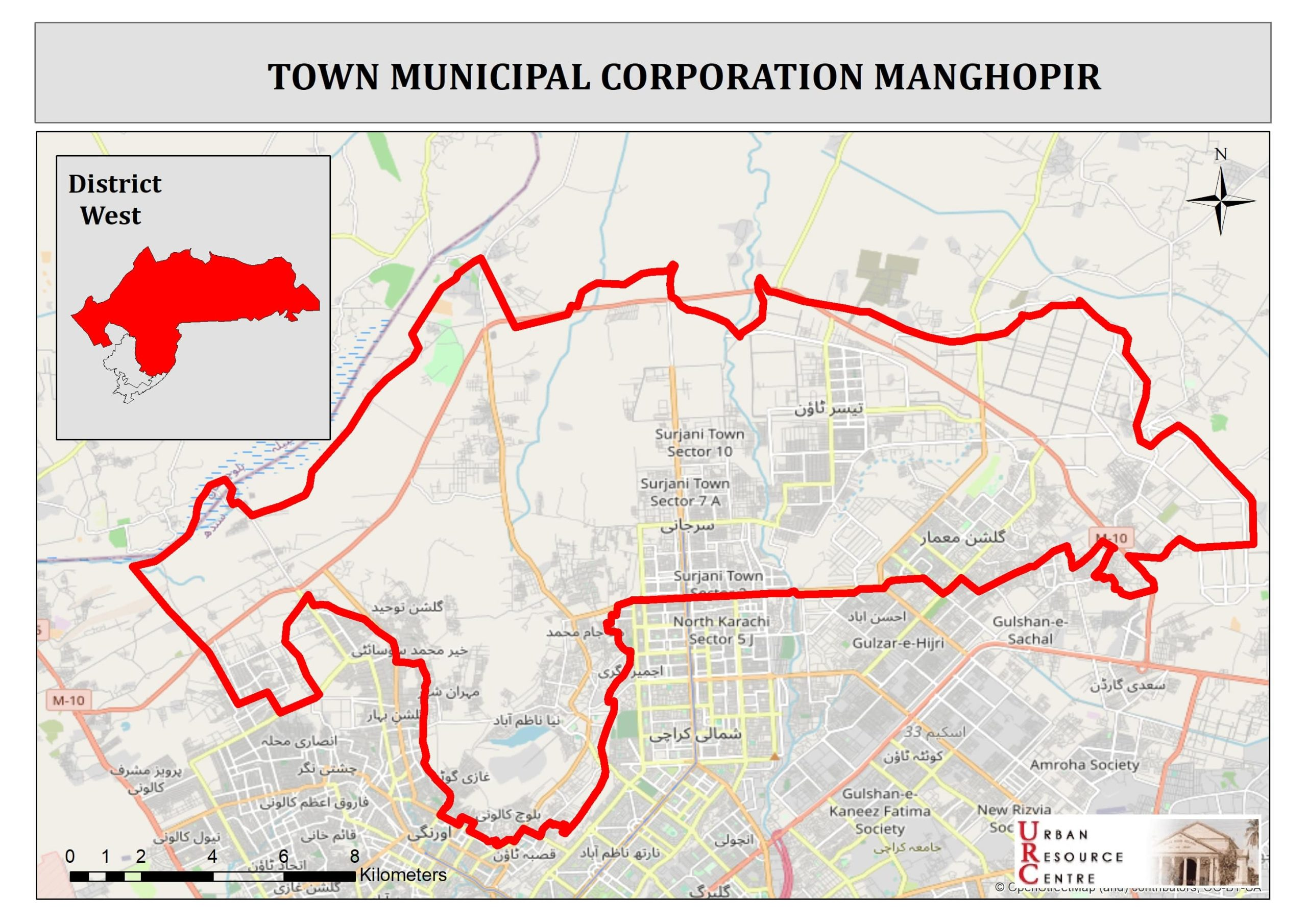
- Manghopir Town Map
- Country: Pakistan
- Province: Sindh
- District: Orangi District
- Division: Karachi Division
- Town Chairman: Nawaz Ali Brohi
- Municipal Commissioner: Agha Fahad
- Town Status: 2015; 11 years ago
- Union Committees in Town Municipal Corporation: 16: Mai Ghari Manghopir Pukhtoonabad Surjani Yousuf Goth Raheem Goth KDA Flats Bhatti Goth Khuda Ki Basti Lyari Expressway Resettlement Project Hassan Goth Gulshan-e-Maymar Mullah Hussain Brohi Kuwari Colony MPR Colony Gabol Colony

Government
  - Type: Government of Karachi
  - Constituency: NA-244 Karachi West-I
  - National Assembly Member: Farooq Sattar (Muttahida Qaumi Movement)

Area
  - Constituent Town of Karachi: 342.0 km^{2} (132.0 sq mi)
- Elevation: 60 m (200 ft)
- Highest elevation: 528 m (1,732 ft)
- Lowest elevation: 28 m (92 ft)

Population (2023 Pakistani census)
  - Constituent Town of Karachi: 1,081,753
  - Density: 3,163.02/km^{2} (8,192.2/sq mi)
  - Urban: 832,801
  - Rural: 248,952
- Demonym: Karachiite
- Time zone: UTC+05:00 (PKT)
  - Summer (DST): DST is not observed
- ZIP Code: 75890
- NWD (area) code: 021
- ISO 3166 code: PK-SD
- Motorways & Minor Arterial Road: M-10 & Manghopir Road

Manghopir Town (Urdu: منگھوپیر ٹاؤن) is a neighbourhood located in the north-western part of Karachi, in Pakistan's Sindh province. It is one of the three towns of Orangi District in Karachi Division, that was previously part of Gadap Town until 2011. Now it is one of the three towns of Orangi District of Karachi. Manghopir Town has a population of 1.8 million, as of the 2023 Pakistani census.

== Town Municipal Committee ==
As per the Sindh Local Government Act, 2021, Sindh government replaced the previous seven District Municipal Corporations (DMCs) with 26 towns, each with its own municipal committee. Karachi West District has three towns.

- Manghopir Town
- Mominabad Town
- Orangi Town

== Demographics ==
Manghopir is a rural area of Karachi. The area has the oldest Sufi shrines in the city named after a Saint Saqib, hot sulphur springs that are believed to have curative powers, and many crocodiles - believed locally to be the sacred disciples of Pir Mangho. .

There are several ethnic groups in Manghopir Town. The Population of Manghopir Sub-Division is 1,081,753 as of the 2023 census's

Languages of Manghopir Sub-Division (2023 census)
1. Urdu (54.0%)
2. Pashto (15.6%)
3. Punjabi (6.80%)
4. Sindhi (6.73%)
5. Saraiki (6.47%)
6. Baloch (4.08%)
7. Others (6.25%)

| Language | Rank | 2023 census | Speakers | 2017 census | Speakers | Growth rate (2017-2023) |
|---|---|---|---|---|---|---|
| Urdu | 1 | 54.0% | 584,229 | 44.97% | 319,870 | ▲20% |
| Pashto | 2 | 15.63% | 169,149 | 19.56% | 139,166 | ▼20% |
| Punjabi | 3 | 6.80% | 73,612 | 8.19% | 58,307 | ▼17% |
| Sindhi | 4 | 6.73% | 72,841 | 6.63% | 47,166 | ▲1.5% |
| Saraiki | 5 | 6.47% | 70,043 | 7.19% | 51,173 | ▼10% |
| Balochi | 6 | 4.08% | 44,211 | 4.25% | 30,232 | ▼4% |
| Others | 7 | 6.25% | 67,668 | 9.18% | 65,322 | ▼31% |
| All | 8 | 100% | 1,081,753 | 100% | 711,236 | ▲52% |

Religion

Religions in Manghopir sub-division (2023)
| Religion | Percent |
| Islam | 96.12% |
| Christianity | 3.18% |
| Hinduism | 0.57% |
| Other | 0.11% |

There are 1,039,887 Muslims, 34,417 Christians, 6,186 Hindus, 230 Ahmadiyya, 79 scheduled castes, 475 Sikhs, 251 Parsis and 258 others of total population 1,081,753 of Manghopir sub-division.

== Town Municipal Corporation ==
On 29 September 2022 the Government of Sindh issued a notification of remaining names of Union Committees of Manghopir, Orangi District of Karachi Division.

16 Union Committees of Manghopir in Town Municipal Corporation

| Sub Sr Number | Number of Union Committee | Name of UC in Town Municipal Corporation |
|---|---|---|
| 1 | UC#01 | Mai Ghari |
| 2 | UC#02 | Maghopir |
| 3 | UC#03 | Pukhtoonabad |
| 4 | UC#04 | Surjani |
| 5 | UC#05 | Yousuf Goth |
| 6 | UC#06 | Raheem Goth |
| 7 | UC#07 | KDA Flats |
| 8 | UC#08 | Bhatti Goth |
| 9 | UC#09 | Khuda Ki Basti |
| 10 | UC#10 | Lyari Expressway Resettlement Project |
| 11 | UC#11 | Hassan Goth |
| 12 | UC#12 | Gulshan-e-Maymar |
| 13 | UC#13 | Mullah Hussain Brohi |
| 14 | UC#14 | Kuwari Colony |
| 15 | UC#15 | MPR Colony |
| 16 | UC#16 | Gabol Colony |

== Manghopir Sub-Division Areas ==
- Surjani Town
- Taiser Town
- Qalandarani Goth
- Abdullah Goth
- Gulshan-e-Maymar
- Khuda Ki Basti
- Gulshan-e-Tauheed
- Manghopir
- Ghazi Goth Orangi
- Ittehad Town
- KDA Flats
- Khairabad
- Zebo Goth
- Northern Bypass

== Adjoining Areas ==
- New Karachi Town
- North Karachi Town
- Gulshan-e-Bahar
- Baldia Town

== Constituensy ==
NA-244 Karachi West-I

== Manghopir Lake ==
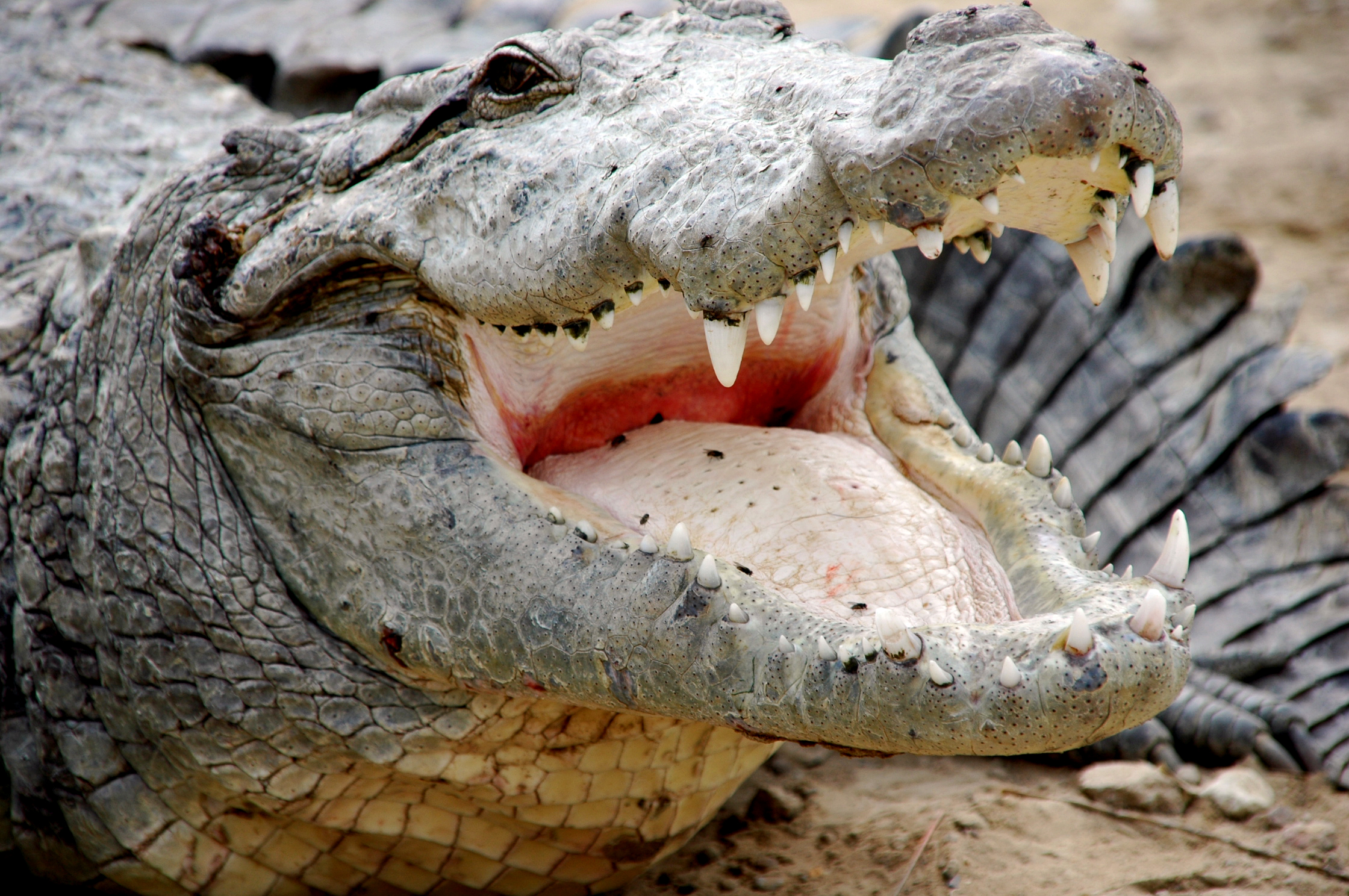
Crocodile near the sulphur hot spring

The Manghopir Lake is situated near the shrine of Sufi Pir Mangho and there over one hundred Mugger crocodiles in the lake which are fed by the pilgrims.

== Sheedis and Festivals ==
Manghopir is mostly inhabited by one of Pakistan's smallest ethnic communities, the Sheedi, also known as Makrani. Sheedi are said to be the descendants of Afro-Arabs from Zanzibar and maintain their distinct Afro-Arab and Omani identity in the midst of the dominating South Asian cultures.

Presently, these African-Pakistanis live in various parts of Karachi. Most are found in Lyari, but they are also found in Malir, Moaach Goth, Manghopir, and further in southern at Sindh and Balochistan. Due to Lyari's dominant Sheedi people population, it is often called 'Little Africa'. Some Afro-Arab style festivals and dances like Gowati, Lewa, Dhamaal, beating Omani style shindo, jabwah, and jasser drums are still popular in Manghopirs Lyari locale. Many forms of folk beliefs and medicines are also still practiced. A prominent Urdu poet and Lyari citizen, Noon Meem Danish, proudly claims to be the great-great-grandchild of an African from Zanzibar. "Now after centuries of cultural assimilation, Sheedis proudly call themselves Sindhis and Baloch.

== See also ==
- Pir Mangho
- Manghopir Hills
- Gallery of the shrines and spring in Manghopir
- Manghopir Lake
