= Kawandi =

Kawandi or Kavandi is a style of quilting originating from the Siddi community of Karnataka, India. The style has been described as patchwork, but in truth it is an appliqué style.

== Technique ==
Women are the primary makers of kawandi. Appliqué fabric for the front of the quilts is sourced from used clothing or other recycled fabric. Old and worn kawandi quilts may be recycled into new quilts.

The rectangular strips or square scraps of fabric are usually pieced in geometric formations, although some makers choose to add symbols. The backing is often made from saris. It and the applique pieces are most commonly sewn together simultaneously using wide stitches of white thread.

The quilters work along the edges of the piece and then towards the center, where the most ornate piece of fabric is usually placed. Additional bright fabric scraps, called tikeli, may also be attached to the quilt's front. Small triangular decorative pieces of fabric, called phula, are attached to the corners of a kawandi piece, and are considered the finishing touch. Some makers sew a few grains of rice into the end of the quilt as a blessing.

== Background and history ==
The Siddi community are the descendants of slaves brought to the region from East Africa, and the Kawandi style retains some East African influences.

Girls traditionally learn kawandi from their mothers, and it is expected that married women are able to make kawandi quilts for their husband and his family. The quilts serve a functional purpose, and are used as blankets, mattresses, coverings for guests to sit on, or to swaddle babies.

Until 2004, kawandi was primarily made for use within the Siddi community. Since 2004, with the establishment of the Siddi Women's Quilting Cooperative, some quilts have been made to be sold abroad. Outside interest in the quilts has helped to revitalize the craft, as the increasing use of machine stitching was leading to fewer quilts being created in the community.
