= Ho Jamalo =

Folk song and associated dance in the Sindhi culture

- Genre: Folk music And Dance traditional
- Asal: Wilayah Lar, Sindh, Pakistan
- Language: Bahasa Sindhi
- Form of performance: Reciprocal singing and group dancing
- Accompaniment: Duhl (drum ketel) and applause
- Function: Celebration, welcome, and expression of joy

"Ho Jamalo" is a Sindhi-language folk song and associated dance in the Sindhi culture. The performance is about the local folk hero Jamalo. It is sung in chorus to the rhythm created by the clapping of the hands apart from musical instruments. Its composition is simple and is intelligible to every Sindhi. The word 'Jamalo' is derived from the Arabic word Jamal which means beauty. The dance is performed as part of a victory or celebration. Though it originated in Sindh, it is popular throughout Pakistan as well as the Sindhi Hindus in India.

A Punjabi rendition of the song was performed by Ali Sethi and Humaira Arshad in season 11 of Coke Studio Pakistan.

== History of Ho Jamalo ==
There are several versions of the history of Ho Jamalo.

According to one origin story, during British colonial rule, Jamalo Sheedi, a death-row prisoner in Sukkur, volunteered to test-drive a train across the newly constructed Sukkur Bridge (Lansdowne Bridge) in exchange for his freedom. His successful crossing led to his pardon, and in jubilation, his relatives composed the song with the refrain "Ho Jamalo, Wah Wah Jamalo."

Another story goes that a fierce battle was fought somewhere in upper Sindh and the dwellers of the area were facing extreme challenges against the invaders. At this juncture, a man named Jamal, who was very brave and courageous, led a small army to fight against the invaders. There was a fierce and bloody encounter and he emerged victorious. When he came home within sight of their settlement, the women of the area came out singing: ‘Ho Jamalo, khati aayo khair saan.’ Translation: Oh great Jamalo, you have come victorious without facing any loss.

There was also a recent trend which happened in the 2020s where people confused the lyrics Ho Jamalo with Dahi Jamalo which actually brought this song more into trend

== See also ==
- Sindhi culture
