= Siddi =

Bantu ethnicity in Pakistan and India

Siddi, Sheedi
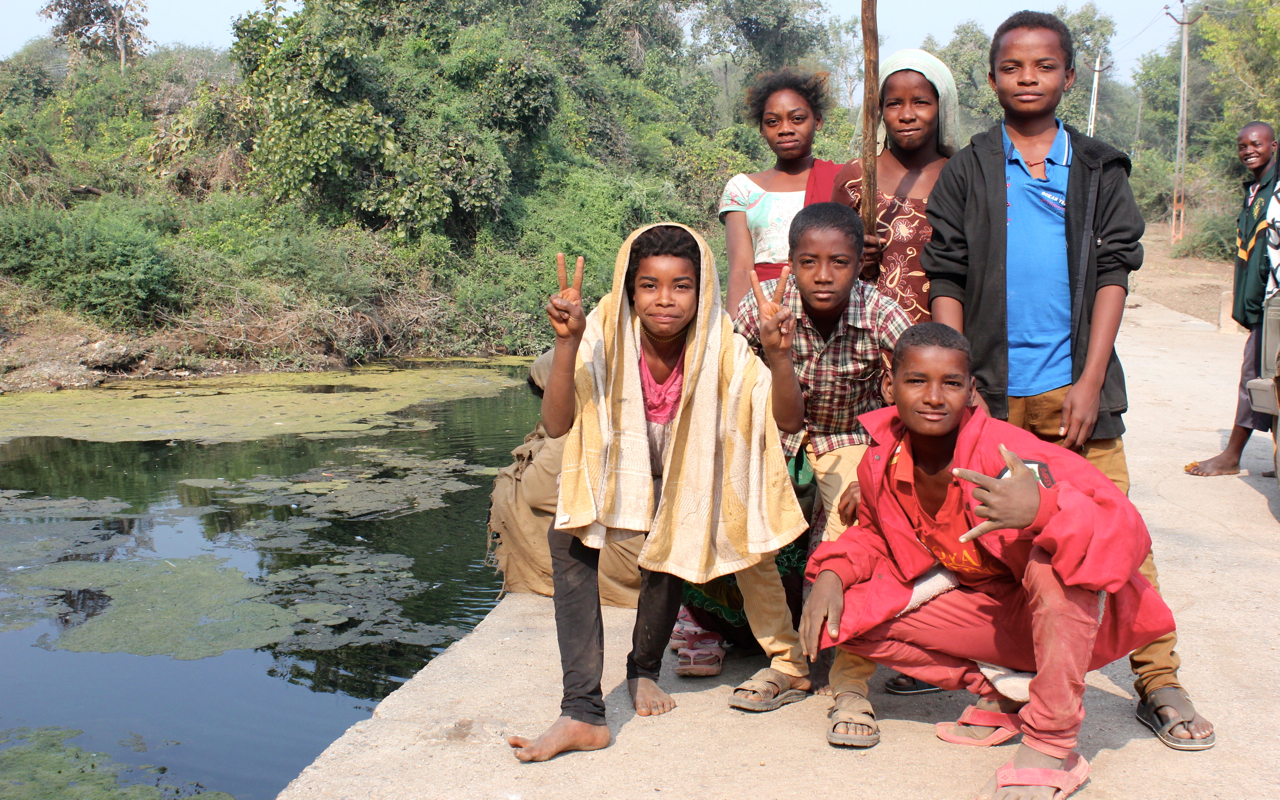
- Muslim Siddi community in India

Total population
- c. 289,028–1,039,028

Regions with significant populations
- Pakistan: 250,000 to 1 million
- India: 19,514
- Karnataka: 10,477 (2011 census)
- Gujarat: 8,661
- Daman and Diu: 193
- Goa: 183

Languages
- Balochi, Sindhi, Gujarati, Kannada and other South Asian languages

Religion
- Predominantly: Sunni Islam; Minority: Christianity; Hinduism

The Siddi (pronounced [sɪdːiː]), also known as the Sheedi, Sidi, or Siddhi, are an ethnic group living in Pakistan and India. They are primarily descended from the Bantu peoples of the Zanj coast in Southeast Africa, most of whom came to the Indian subcontinent through the Indian Ocean slave trade. Others arrived as merchants, sailors, indentured servants, and mercenaries.

== Etymology ==
There are conflicting hypotheses on the origin of the name Siddi. One theory is that the word derives from sahibi, an Arabic term of respect in North Africa, similar to the word sahib in modern India and Pakistan. A second theory is that the term Siddi is derived from the title borne by the captains of the Arab vessels that first brought Siddi settlers to India; these captains were known as Sayyid. A different name occasionally used for the Siddi is the term "Habshi". While originally used to refer specifically to people from Abyssinia, the term later became more broadly used to refer to Africans of any ethnicity, but not necessarily referring to the Siddi specifically. Similarly, this term for Siddis is held to be derived from the common name for the captains of the Abyssinian ships that also first delivered Siddi slaves to the subcontinent. Historian Richard M. Eaton states Habshis were initially pagans sold by Ethiopian Christians to Gujarati merchants for Indian textiles.

Siddis are also sometimes referred to as Afro-Indians. Siddis were referred to as Zanji by Arabs; in China, various transcriptions of this Arabic word were used, including Xinji (辛吉) and Jinzhi (津芝).

== History ==
The Siddi population derived primarily from Bantu peoples of Southeast Africa who were brought to the Indian subcontinent as slaves. Most of these migrants were or else became Muslims, while a small minority became Hindu. The Nizam of Hyderabad also employed African-origin guards and soldiers.

The first Siddis are thought to have arrived in India in 628 CE at the Bharuch port. Several others followed with the first Arab Islamic conquest of the subcontinent in 712 CE. The latter group are believed to have been soldiers with Muhammad bin Qasim's Arab army, and were called Zanjis.

Some Siddis escaped slavery to establish communities in forested areas. Siddis were also brought as slaves by the Deccan Sultanates. These Siddis embraced Deccani Muslim culture, and identified with the Deccani Indian Muslim political faction against the Iranian Shia immigrants. Several former slaves rose to high ranks in the military and administration, the most prominent of which was Malik Ambar.

== Geographical distribution ==
=== India ===
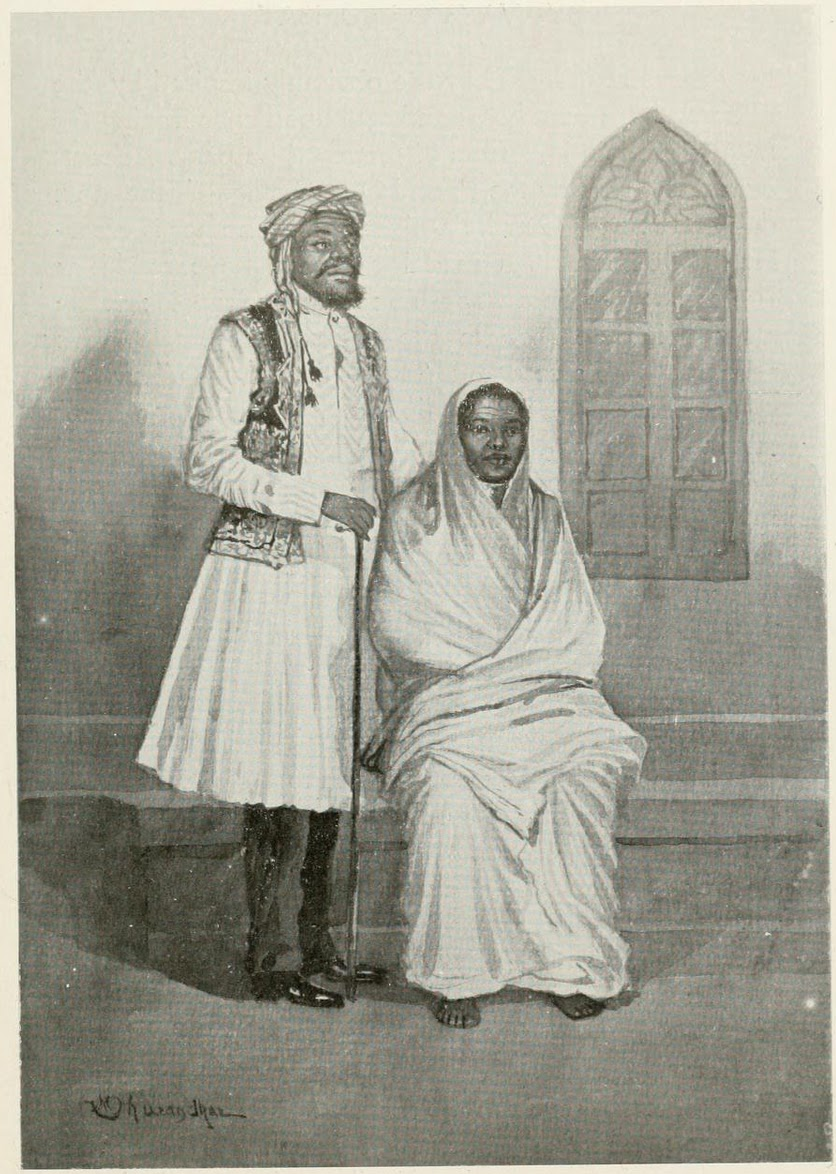
Sidis of Madras

Harris (1971) provides a historical survey of the eastward dispersal of slaves from Southeast Africa to places like India. Hamilton (1990) argues that Siddis in India, their histories, experiences, cultures, and expressions, are integral to the African Diaspora and thus, help better understand the dynamics of dispersed peoples. More recent focused scholarship argues that although Siddis are numerically a minority, their historic presence in India for over five hundred years, as well as their self-perception, and how the broader Indian society relates to them, make them a distinct Bantu/Indian. Historically, Siddis have not existed only within binary relations to the nation state and imperial forces. They did not simply succumb to the ideologies and structures of imperial forces, nor did they simply rebel against imperial rule. The Siddi are recognized as a scheduled tribe in 3 states and 1 union territory: Goa, Gujarat, Maharashtra, Karnataka and Daman and Diu.

==== Hyderabad ====
In the 18th century, a Siddi community arrived with the Arabs, and frequently served as cavalry guards to the Asif Jahi Nizam of Hyderabad's army. The Asif Jahi rulers patronised them with rewards and the traditional Marfa music gained popularity and would be performed during official celebrations and ceremonies.

==== Gujarat ====
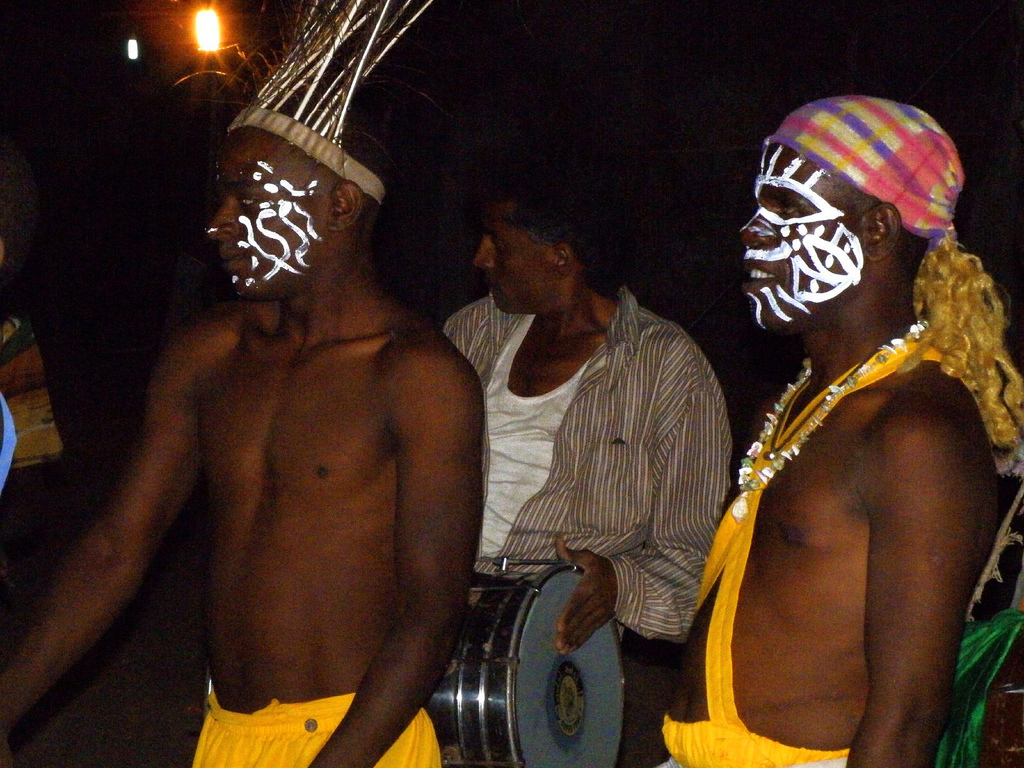
Siddi Folk dancers, at Devaliya Naka, Sasan Gir, Gujarat.

Supposedly presented as slaves by the Portuguese to the local Prince, Nawab of Junagadh, the Siddis also live around Gir Forest National Park and Wildlife sanctuary. On the way to Deva-dungar is the village of Sirvan, inhabited entirely by Siddis. They were brought 300 years ago from Portuguese colonial territories for the Nawab of Junagadh. Today, they follow very few of their original customs, with a few exceptions like the traditional Dhamal dance.

Although Gujarati Siddis have adopted the language and many customs of their surrounding populations, some of their Bantu traditions have been preserved. These include the Goma music and dance form, which is sometimes called Dhamaal (Gujarati: ધમાલ, fun). The term is believed to be derived from the Ngoma drumming and traditional dance forms of the Bantu people inhabiting Central, East and Southern Africa. The Goma also has a spiritual significance and, at the climax of the dance, some dancers are believed to be vehicles for the presence of Siddi saints of the past.

Goma music comes from the Kiswahili word "ngoma", which means a drum or drums. It also denotes any dancing occasion where traditional drums are principally used.

The majority of the Siddis in Gujarat are Muslims (98.7%), with very few following Hinduism (1%).

==== Karnataka ====
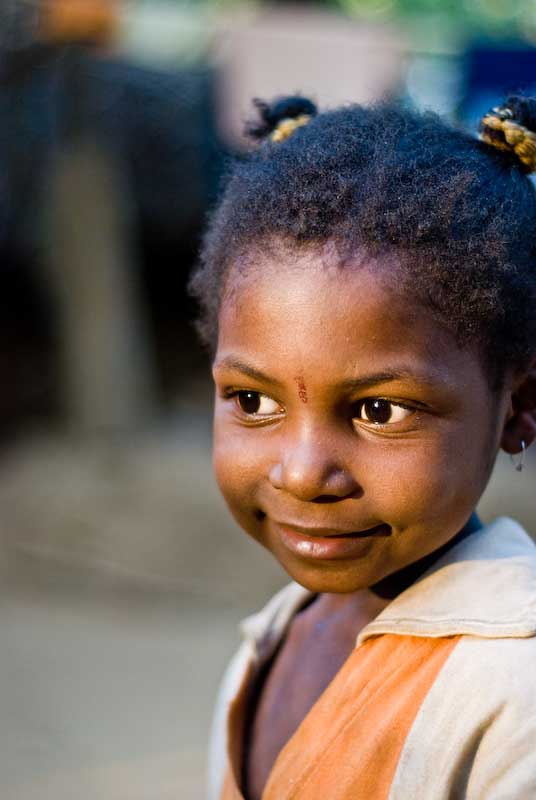
A Siddi girl from the town of Yellapur in Uttara Kannada district, Karnataka, India.

The Siddis of Karnataka (also spelled Siddhis) are an ethnic minority group of mainly Bantu descent that has made Karnataka their home for the last 400 years. There is a 50,000-strong Siddhi population across India, of which more than a third live in Karnataka. In Karnataka, they are concentrated around Yellapur, Haliyal, Ankola, Joida, Mundgod and Sirsi taluks of Uttara Kannada and in Khanapur of Belgaum and Kalaghatagi of Dharwad district. Many members of the Siddis community of Karnataka had migrated to Pakistan after independence and have settled in Karachi, Sindh.

A plurality of the Siddis in Karnataka follow Hinduism (41.8%), followed by Islam (30.6%) and Christianity (27.4%).

=== Pakistan ===
In Pakistan, locals of Bantu descent are called "Sheedi" and "SheediMakrani". They live primarily along the Makran in Balochistan, and Southern Sindh. Even though most Sheedis today in Pakistan are of mixed heritage and the number population is complex to determine, the population in 2018 was estimated to be of around 250,000. Many Sheedis have largely assimilated into the larger Baloch identity, and linguistically, they speak variations of Balochi, Sindhi (in Karachi), and have created a distinct dialect of Urdu named Makrani, with Urdu words mixed with Balochi and Sindhi expressions and common English terms, mainly picked up from English films and TV series.

Although Sheedi remains a neutral term, many individuals are moving away from it, instead adopting the surname Qambrani, in reverence to Qambar, the freed slave of Ali, while others prefer the name Bilali, referencing Bilal, a companion of Prophet Muhammad.

==== Sindh ====
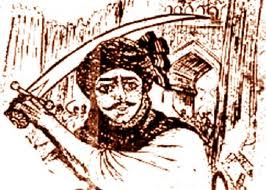
Depiction of Hoshu Sheedi

African presence in Sindh is documented from 711 A.D. after the Umayyad conquest of Sindh. However, significant African slave importation to Sindh occurred from the late 18th to mid-19th centuries, during the peak of the Omani-Arab slave trade. Slaves mostly from modern-day Kenya and Tanzania, were captured and sold in Zanzibar, then shipped to Muscat until reaching Karachi. The demand for African slaves increased in Sindh as the Talpur rulers granted land to Baloch warlords, who sought slaves.

A few slaves, due to their intelligence and loyalty, rose to prominence. Hoshu Sheedi fought during the British conquest of Sindh, particularly at the Battle of Hyderabad in 1843, where he died fighting. He is remembered as a hero and symbol of Sindhi resistance, with his battle cry: "My head you may take, but my Sindh I will not forsake." After the British defeated the Talpurs, they banned slavery and the slave trade in Sindh, leading to the emancipation of the Siddi community.

Siddis are largely populated in different towns and villages in southern Sindh. In the city of Karachi, the main Siddi centre is the area of Lyari and other nearby coastal areas. The Mombasa street in Lyari is named after the city of Mombasa in Kenya. The children of interracial marriage of a Sindhi man and a Siddi woman are called Gadra/Gada/Guda.

Most Siddi in Karachi are historically associated with the fishing business, traditionally working as fishermen, sailors and small boat operators. They also constitute the largest labour force employed at the Port of Karachi and harbour. Many increasingly have pursued higher professions. Muhammad Siddique Musafir was a popular writer and poet of the Sindhi language. During the British Raj, notable leaders of Siddi descent emerged through local self-government initiatives, including the mayor of Karachi Allah Bakhsh Gabol. His son Abdul Sattar Gabol became one of the founding members of the Pakistan People's Party. Tanzeela Qambrani became the first Siddi woman to be elected as the member of Provincial Assembly of Sindh in 2018 Pakistani general election.

==== Balochistan ====
The arrival of Africans on the Makran coast of Balochistan is tied to the same slave trade that brought Sindhi Sheedis from East Africa. However, their journey was likely more intricate due to the historical recruitment of Baloch mercenaries by the rulers of Oman, along with African slaves as soldiers and labourers on date farms. This created a historical link between the two groups. In 1782, the ruler of the Khanate of Kalat, who controlled Makran, ceded Gwadar and surrounding territories to Oman, facilitating further interaction between the two groups. As the 18th century progressed, the Sultan of Oman expanded his influence along the Iranian coast acquiring various ports, which allowed African slaves engaged in maritime activities to reach Gwadar and other regions that are now part of Pakistan. In the late 19th and early 20th centuries, famines and slave rebellions in coastal Iran led to the liberation and migration of many slaves and free individuals towards the East, with a significant number settling in eastern Makran. Many ultimately moved to Lyari in Karachi.

In the interior of the Makran district and surrounding Balochistan areas, where Sheedis were historically used as slave labourers on date farms, many still find themselves in bonded labour situations today. Despite the formal abolition of slavery by the ruler of Kalat in 1914, the practice of keeping domestic slaves persisted until the late 1950s. Today, some landlords and religious leaders continue to employ black servants.

== Genetics ==
Recent advances in genetic analyses have helped shed some light on the ethnogenesis of the Siddi. Genetic genealogy, although a novel tool that uses the genes of modern populations to trace their ethnic and geographic origins, has also helped clarify the possible background of the modern Siddi.

=== Y DNA ===
A Y-chromosome study by Shah et al. (2011) tested Siddi individuals in India for paternal lineages. The authors observed the E1b1a1-M2 haplogroup, which is frequent among Bantu peoples, in about 42% and 34% of Siddis from Karnataka and Gujarat, respectively. Around 14% of Siddis from Karnataka and 35% of Siddis from Gujarat also belonged to the Sub-Saharan B-M60. The remaining Siddis had Indian associated or Near Eastern-linked clades, including haplogroups P, H, R1a-M17, J2 and L-M20.

Thangaraj (2009) observed similar, mainly Bantu-linked paternal affinities amongst the Siddi.

Qamar et al. (2002) analysed Makrani Sheedis in Pakistan and found that they instead predominantly carried Indian-associated or Near Eastern-linked haplogroups. R1a1a-M17 (30.30%), J2 (18.18%) and R2 (18.18%) were their most common male lineages. Only around 12% carried Africa-derived clades, which mainly consisted of the archaic haplogroup B-M60, of which they bore the highest frequency of any Pakistani population Underhill et al. (2009) likewise detected a relatively high frequency of R1a1a-M17 (25%) subclade among Makrani Sheedis.

=== mtDNA ===
According to an mtDNA study by Shah et al. (2011), the maternal ancestry of the Siddi consists of mostly Bantu-associated haplogroups with barely any Indian-associated haplogroups, reflecting insignificant female gene flow from neighbouring Indian populations. About 95% of the Siddis from Gujarat and 99% of the Siddis from Karnataka belonged to various Bantu-derived macro-haplogroup L subclades. The latter mainly consisted of L0 and L2a sublineages associated with Bantu women. The remainder possessed Indian-specific subclades of the Eurasian haplogroups M and N, which points to recent admixture with autochthonous Indian groups.

=== Autosomal DNA ===
Narang et al. (2011) examined the autosomal DNA of Siddis in India. According to the researchers, about 58% of the Siddis' ancestry is derived from Bantu peoples. The remainder is associated with locals North and Northwest Indian populations, due to recent admixture events.

Similarly, Shah et al. (2011) observed that Siddis in Gujarat derive 66.90%–70.50% of their ancestry from Bantu forebears, while the Siddis in Karnataka possess 64.80%–74.40% such Southeast African ancestry. The remaining autosomal DNA components in the studied Siddi were mainly associated with local South Asian populations. According to the authors, gene flow between the Siddis' Bantu ancestors and local Indian populations was also largely unidirectional. They estimate this admixture episode's time of occurrence at within the past 200 years or eight generations.

== Culture ==
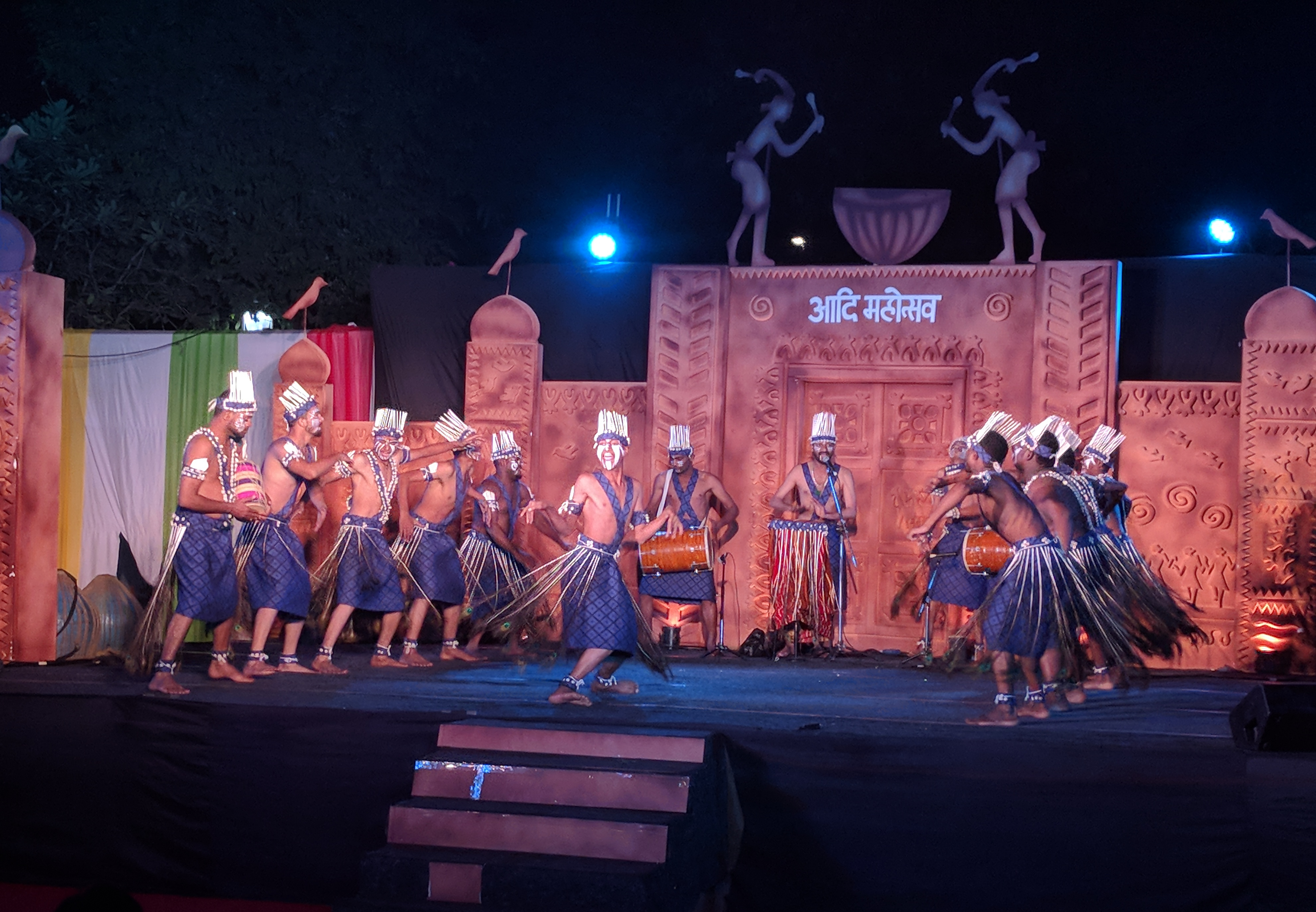
Siddi tribal dance performance in Delhi

While they have assimilated in many ways to the dominant culture, they have also kept some ancestral practices especially in music and dance. Like other ethnic groups separated by geography, there are both differences and similarities in cultural practices among the Siddi.

=== Clothing ===
When it comes to dress, women and men dress in typical South Asian attires. Siddi women wear the garments predominant in their locale, which can be colorful saris accessorised with bindis in India or salwar kameez in Pakistan. Men wear what is generally appropriate for men in their communities.

=== Festivals ===
The annual Sheedi Mela festival in Pakistan is the key event in the Sheedi community's cultural calendar. Some glimpses of the rituals at the festival include visit to sacred alligators at Mangopir, playing music and dance. Clearly, the instrument, songs and dance appear to be derived from Africa.

They are also active in cultural activities and annual festivals, like the Habash Festival, with the support of several community organisations. In Sindh, Sheedi men perform a unique dance on "mugarman" an ancestral traditional musical instrument of Sheedis, dressed in their traditional attire with markings on face, they also perform dangerous stunts while performing like spitting fire out of mouth, the dance is generally called as Sheedi dance.

=== Music ===
In the nascent Baloch culture awareness in the 20th century, many individuals involved in this cultural and political revitalization were of African descent. Among them was Bilawal Belgium from Lyari, who gained national and international acclaim for his mastery of the banjo for Sindhi and Balochi music on Radio Pakistan and as a member of Pakistan's official music groups travelling to different countries.

=== Assimilation ===
Generally, the Siddi primarily associate and marry members of their own communities. It is rare for the Siddi to marry outside of their communities although in Pakistan a growing number of the Sheedi intermarry as a way to dilute their African lineage and reduce racial discrimination and prejudice.

Siddi communities, although classified as a tribe by the Indian government, primarily live in agricultural communities where men are responsible for the farming and women are responsible for the home and children. Outside of their communities, men also tend to be employed as farm hands, drivers, manual labourers, and security guards.

As in other aspects of life, the Siddi have adopted the common dietary practices of the dominant society. An example of a staple meal would be a large portions of rice with dal and pickles.

=== Sports ===
Athletics has been an important part of the Siddi community and has been a means to uplift youth and a means of escape from poverty and discrimination. Football and boxing are the most popular sports, and some of the most notable boxers and footballers in Pakistan have emerged from the Sheedi community.

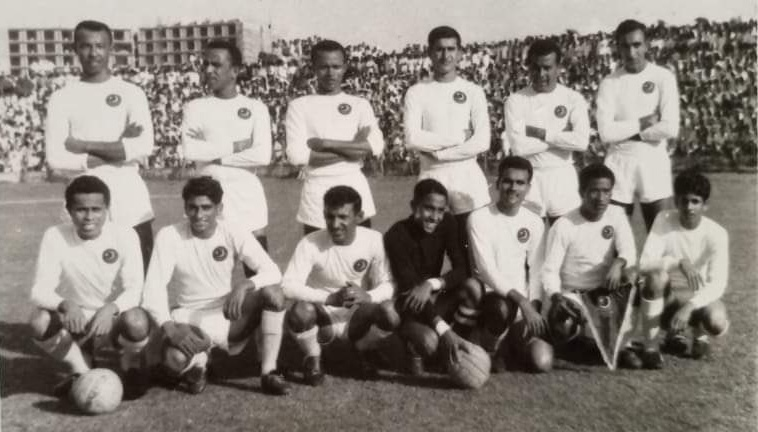
Sheedi dominated Pakistan national football team in 1964

The Sheedi community has played a large role in Pakistani football history, particularly during its early years. Notable Sheedi players include Abdul Ghafoor, nicknamed the "Pakistani Pelé" and "Black Pearl of Pakistan", Muhammad Umer, Moosa Ghazi, Abid Ghazi, Turab Ali, Abdullah Rahi, Murad Bakhsh, Qadir Bakhsh, Maula Bakhsh, among others.

== Religion ==
Siddis are primarily Muslims, although some are Hindus and others belong to the Catholic Church. Majority of Sheedis in Pakistan belong to the Sunni Barelvi school of faith. The Sufi saint Pir Mangho is regarded by many as an important Wali, and the annual Sheedi Mela festival is the key event in the Sheedi community's cultural calendar.

== Films and books ==
- From Africa...To Indian Subcontinent: Sidi Music in the Indian Ocean Diaspora (2003) by Amy Catlin-Jairazbhoy, in close collaboration with Nazir Ali Jairazbhoy and the Sidi community.
- Mon petit diable (My Little Devil) (1999) was directed by Gopi Desai. Om Puri, Pooja Batra, Rushabh Patni, Satyajit Sharma.
- Razia Sultan (1983), an Indian Urdu film directed by Kamal Amrohi, is based on the life of Razia Sultan (played by Hema Malini) (1205–1240), the only female Sultan of Delhi (1236–1240), and her speculated love affair with the Abyssinian slave Jamal-ud-Din Yakut (played by Dharmendra). He was referred to in the movie as a habshee.
- A Certain Grace: The Sidi, Indians of African Descent by Ketaki Sheth, Photolink, 2013.
- Shaping Membership, Defining Nation: The Cultural Politics of African Indians in South Asia (2007) by Pashington Obeng.
- Inside a Lost African Tribe Still Living in India Today (2018) by Asha Stuart
- #unfair (2019) a film produced by Public Service Broadcast Trust directed by Wenceslaus Mendes, Paranjoy Guha Thakurta, Anushka Matthews, Mohit Bhalla

== Notable Siddis ==
- Malik Ambar, military leader
- Hassan Ali Mirza, first nawab of Murshidabad
- Shantaram Siddi, politician; first ever Indian legislator of African descent
- Jamal-ud-Din Yaqut, slave-turned-nobleman and a close confidant of Delhi Sultanate monarch Razia Sultana
- Zamor, French revolutionary

== See also ==
- Afro-Iranians
- Afro-Asians in South Asia
- Africa–India relations
- Dougla people
- Habshi dynasty
- Sri Lanka Kaffirs
- List of Scheduled Tribes in India
