= Manghopir Hills =

Mountain range in southwest Pakistan

Manghopir Hills are located in between Karachi West District of Sindh and Hub District of Balochistan in Pakistan.

The hills in Karachi are the offshoots of the Kirthar Range. The highest point of these hills in Karachi is about 528m in the extreme north. All these hills are devoid of vegetation and have wide intervening plains, dry river beds and water channels.

== See also ==
- Mulri Hills
- Khasa Hills
- Kirthar Mountains
- Manghopir Lake
