= Pakistan Sugar Mills Association =

Pakistan Sugar Mills Association is based is Islamabad, Pakistan.

PSMA was registered in November 1964, established as a representative organization of all sugar mills in Pakistan. Pakistan Sugar Mills Association plays a pivotal role in promoting the development and attaining efficiency in the best interest of the sugar mills and sugar allied industries within the parameters of policy of the Government of Pakistan.

== See also ==
- Sugar refinery
