= Manghopir Lake =

Lake in Pakistan

Coordinates: 24°58′25″N 67°01′29″E

Manghopir Lake is a lake in Pakistan, located about 14 km from North Karachi. The lake is surrounded by the Naya Nazimabad housing project.

== Area ==
Manghopir Lake is spread over an area of 1,400 acres and is part of a migratory bird route. Birds spotted at the lake include eagles, white-breasted kingfishers, Asian bearded owls, pink-breasted finch, black-backed gulls, hawks, trumpeter herons, itchy herons and wood-ducks.

== Crocodiles ==
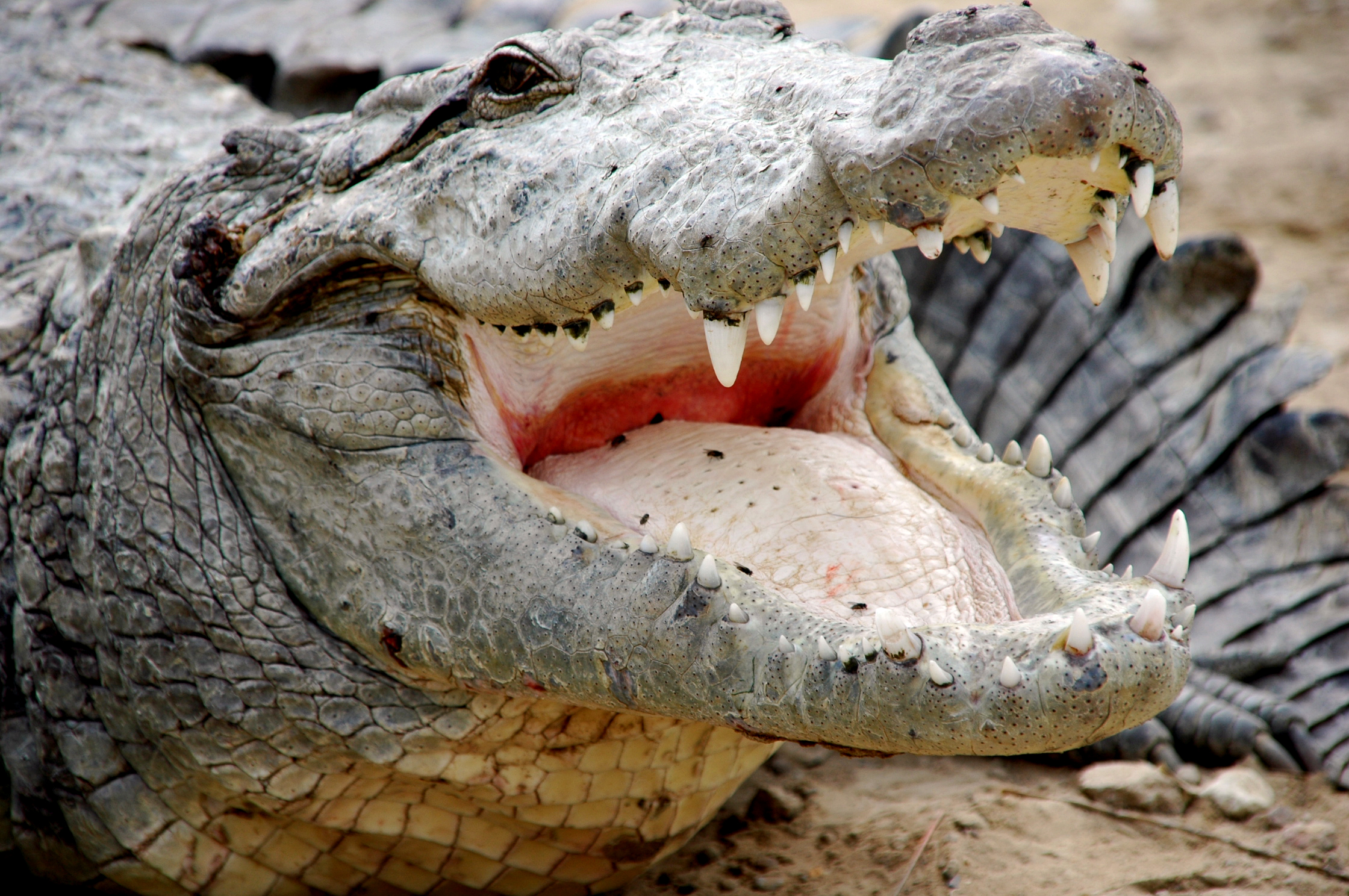
Crocodile near the sulphur hot spring

Manghopir Lake is situated near the shrine of the Sufi saint Pir Mangho, and there are over one hundred Mugger crocodiles in the lake, which are fed by the pilgrims.
