= Zohreh Ghaeni =

Iranian writer

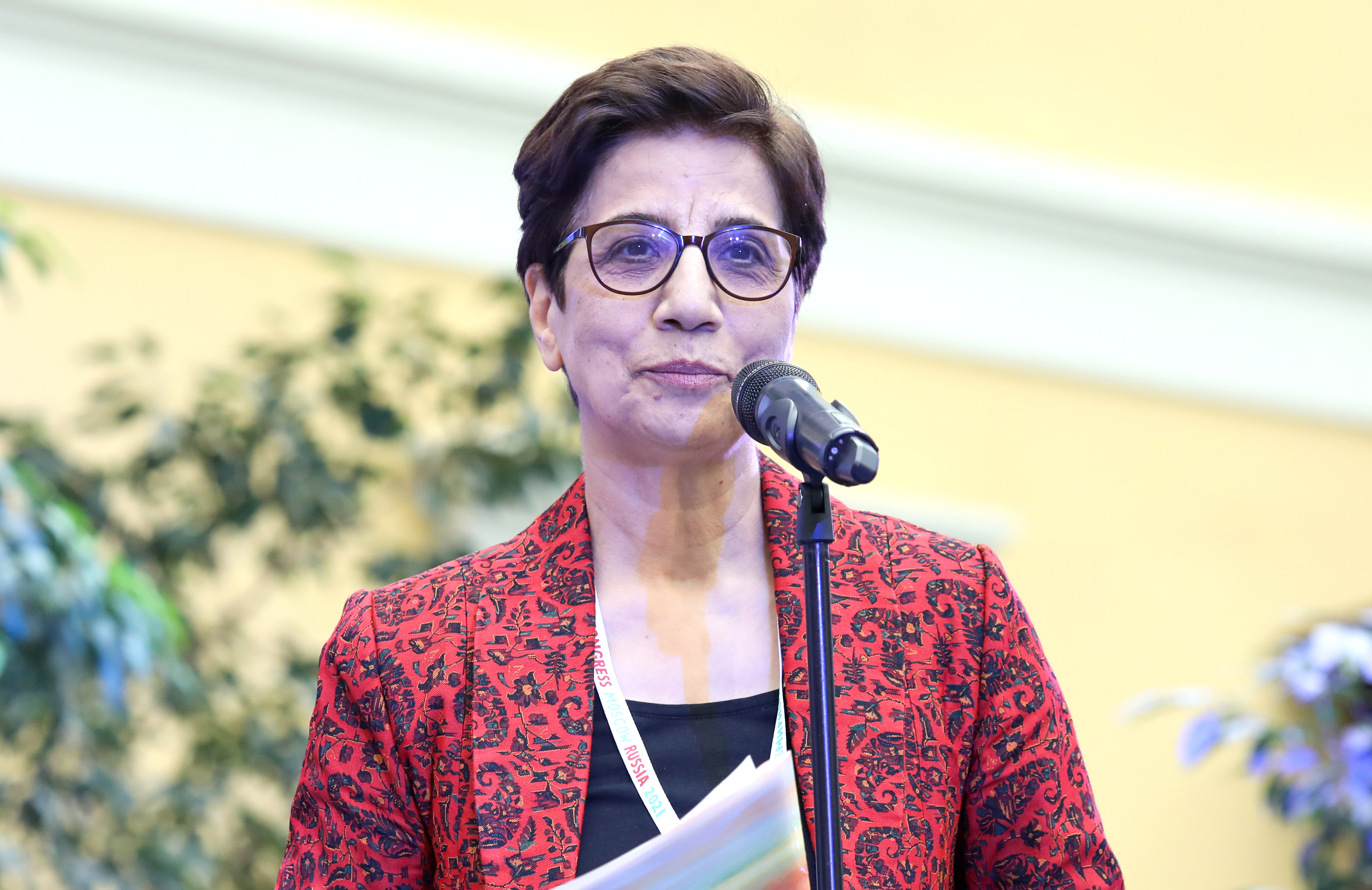
Zohreh Ghaeni

Zohreh Ghaeni (Persian: زهره قایینی; born January 1954) is a children's literature expert, translator, lecturer, researcher and historian. She is the co-writer of the 10-volume research book on the History of Children's Literature in Iran. She is the head of the Read with Me project. She also served as the IBBY Executive committee member from 2016 to 2020.

== Early life and education ==
She was born in Tehran and graduated from the School Sanitation and Hygiene Education at the College of Medical Sciences in Tehran. She worked as a teacher in a village north of Iran, served as chief editor of Young Adult magazine, and studied Librarianship and information science (M.A) at Open University in Tehran. Her dissertation topic is “The responses of 4-6-year-old Iranian children to picture books”.

She researched “The New Illustrations of Old Folktales” when accepted for a fellowship program at the International Institute for Children's Literature, Osaka, and April 1997. In 2000, she was born for a fellowship program at “International Jugendbiblithek” München, where she researched “The Intercultural Communication in English and German Picture Books”. As a lecturer, she held workshops on “The Children’s Literature History and Childhood Studies in Iran” and also ”The Children’s Book Illustration” at the Children's Book Council of Iran (CBCI) (The national section of IBBY) for a long time.

== Career ==
Zohreh Ghaeni is the Director of the Institute for the Research on the History of Children's Literature in Iran, which she co-founded. She was an IBBY Executive committee member from 2016 to 2020. In 2010, she founded Read with Me, a reading promotion program in Iran for children in deprived areas of the country and children in crisis. She is also heading the historical childhood studies in Iran.

She has been a member of the International Jury of the Hans Christian Andersen Award in 2002 and 2004, the Jury president of the Hans Christian Andersen Awards in 2008 and 2010, a member of the International Jury of the CineKid film festival, Amsterdam, Holland, in October 2005; She has also been a member of the International Jury of the Nami Island International Picture Book Illustration Concours, South Korea, in 2013, 2015 & 2017.

== Speeches and presentations ==
- “All Children Have the Right to Read Quality Books”, at Sharjah international children's Literature Festival, April 2013.
- The winner of the 2006 International Sponsorship Grant from the Children's Literature Association for her paper, "A Historical Approach to the Concept of Childhood and Modern Children's Literature in Iran", which was presented through a webcast at the ChLA annual conference in Huntington Beach California on June 11, 2006, with the assistance of the Centre for Research in Young Peoples Texts and Cultures at the University of Winnipeg.
- Presentation of the Hans Christian Andersen Awards, at the 31st IBBY World Congress Copenhagen, 2008.
- Asurik Tree: The Oldest Children's Story in Persian History, at 34th IBBY International Congress Mexico City, 2014.
- Presentation of the Hans Christian Andersen Awards at the 32nd IBBY World Congress in Santiago de Compostela, Spain on Saturday, 11 September 2010, as the President of the Hans Christian Andersen Jury 2010.
- Acceptance speech at IBBY-Asahi Award Ceremony, August 2016, Auckland, New Zealand.
- Children's literature and censorship, at the conference of Norsk barnebokinstitutts, Oslo, Norway, September 2017.
- How Picture Books Helped the Iranian Children in Trauma, delivered at BIBIANA Symposium, Bratislava, February 2020.
- When the Women of Deprived Communities Change the Destiny of Children at Risk, delivered at the 37th IBBY congress, Moscow, Russia, September 2021.
- Childhoods on the sidelines, at the panel in Bologna Children's Book Fair, 21–24 March 2022.
- “Defenders of the Child’s Right to Become a Reader”, three-day workshop for librarians and reading promoters at the Khnko Apor National Children’s Library, Yerevan, Armenia, 4–6 October 2023.

== Selected publications ==
=== Books ===
- Mohammadi, M.H. & Ghaeni, Zohreh. The History Of Children's Literature in Iran (in 10 volumes), Tehran: Cheesta Publishing Co, 2001–2007.
- Ghaeni, Zohreh. Step by Step with the History: A Handbook of sharing history with children and adolescents, Tehran: Cheesta Publishing Co, 2006
- Ghaeni, Zohreh. The Children's Book Illustration, Tehran: IRCHLI Publishing House, 2012.
- Ghaeni, Zohreh & Taheri, Farzaneh. What a Children's Librarian Should Know, Tehran: IRHCLI Publishing House, 2014.
- Ghaeni, Zohreh. Emergent Literacy from Research to Practice: How do Children Become Literate, Tehran: IRHCLI Publishing House, 2022.
- Ghaeni, Zohreh. Cultural Literacy and Reading Promotion in Action, Tehran: IRHCLI Publishing House, 2025.

=== Articles ===
- Ghaeni, Zohreh, Vuohi ja Taatelipalmu (Children's Books Illustration in Iran), Suom Heli Helminen. Onnimanni: The Finnish Institute for Children's Literature (SNI), Number 3 (1997): 22–25.
- Ghaeni, Zohreh, A Brief History of Children's Book Illustration in Iran, In “Fellowship Program Researchers' Report 1996-1997”, [Japan, Osaka: International Institute of Children's Literature in Osaka], 1998. pp. 75–84.
- Ghaeni, Zohreh, New Illustration for Old Folktales In "Fellowship Program Researchers' Report 1996-1997", [Japan, Osaka: International Institute of Children's Literature in Osaka], 1998, pp. 38–56.
- Ghaeni, Zohreh, The Historical Process of Children's Literature Research and Academic Studies in Iran, Children's Literature Association Quarterly, Volume 29, Number 4 (Winter 2004): 359 – 365.
- Ghaeni, Zohreh, Children's Literature in Iran From Tradition to Modernism, Barnboken, 29:1, (January 2006).
- Ghaeni, Zohreh, The Hans Christian Andersen Jury 2008: How it Worked. Bookbird, Volume 46, Number 4 (2008): 26–30.
- Ghaeni, Zohreh, A Historical Approach to the Concept of Childhood and the Modern Children's Literature in Iran. The Project HCLI and IRHCLI. History of Education & Children's Literature, Volume IV, Number 2 (2009): 453–459.
- Ghaeni, Zohreh, Not Letting the Words Lose Themselves. Bookbird, Volume 48, Number 4, (October 2010): 21–27.
- Ghaeni, Zohreh, The History of Children's Literature (1900 - 1940), in: A History of Persian Literature, General Editor Ehsan Yarshater, Volume XI: Literature of the Early Twentieth Century from the Constitutional Period to Reza Shah, Edited by Ali-Asghar Seyed-Gohrab, London, Newyork: I.B.Tauris, 2015. pp. 448 - 469.

== Awards and recognitions ==
- 2016 IBBY-Asahi Reading Promotion Award sponsored by the Asahi Shimbun newspaper (for the direction of the Read with Me project)
- 2022 IBBY-iRead Outstanding Reading Promoter Award sponsored by Shenzhen iRead Foundation
