= Atta Muhammad Bhanbhro =

Pakistani writer, poet, historian, translator, archaeologist and lawyer

- عطا محمد ڀنڀرو
- Born: 1 February 1936; Bachal Bhambhro, Khairpur, Pakistan
- Died: 3 June 2020 (aged 84); Hingorja, Khairpur, Pakistan
- Resting place: Bachal Bhambhro
- Education: Sindh Muslim Law College
- Occupation: Writer, poet, translator, historian, archaeologist, lawyer
- Children: 5
- Writing career
- Language: Sindhi and English
- Years active: 19xx–2020
- Period: 1958 Pakistani coup d'état 1999 Pakistani coup d'état
- Subjects: Politics; Literature; History; Archaeology
- Notable awards: Latif Award; Madar-i-Watan Award

Atta Muhammad Bhanbhro (1 February 1936 – 3 June 2020), also spelled Atta Mohammad Bhambhro, .

== Life and background ==
He was born in a small village called Bachal Bhanbhro in Union Council Rasoolabad, Taluka Sobhodero, Khairpur district near village Mothparja. He completed his early schooling at his hometown. He obtained his undergraduate degree in Khairpur, and later moved to Karachi where he attended Sindh Muslim Law College and obtained Bachelor of Laws. After completing his education, he choose legal profession and started legal practice in Gambat city. He later started practice of law while serving as a junior lawyer with Shaikh Ayaz, a Sindhi poets of Pakistan. He had three sons and three daughters.

== Career ==
=== Literary work ===
In 1980, he translated Iranian children’s literature and Russian literature into English language. In 1989 after residing in Hyderabad, he translated a book titled Sindh Ja Qadeem Asaar which was written on Sindh’s heritage. He then continued working as a translator and translated around one hundred books into Sindhi language, including Sindhu Likhat Ayein Boli, Sikandar Ji Kaah and Sindh Ji Tareekh Moarukhan Ji Zubani.

He wrote books on different subjects such as politics, culture, literature, history and archaeology. His publications included Hur Guerrilla Tehreek, America Ja Sindhi and Sindh Ji Fateh. Bhanbhro's notable contribution included a book titled 'Deciphering Indus Script' in Sindhi language as well as in English. It is believed he was the first Sindhi researcher who made an attempt to understand the Indus Script of ancient language. His book Sindhu Likhat Ji Bhaj (Deciphering Indus Script) has also been published. As an archaeologist, he excavated archaeological sites in Sindh and also wrote a book on the British strategy in the Sindh province. In one of his books titled the Hur Guerilla War he covered Hurs involving guerrilla warfare, and later wrote the Conquest of Sindh and the Islamic seminaries of Thatta.

During the Movement for Restoration of Democracy, a left–wing political alliance formed to end the military government of a Pakistani military dictator and then president general Muhammad Zia-ul-Haq, he was recognized as a poet for supporting the movement through his poetry.

=== Work ===
Key
†	Remarks denote a short description of the work where available.

#	Title	Year	Type/Credited as	Remarks
1	Hur Guerrilla Tehreek	—N/a	Book	—N/a
2	Sindh Ji Fateh	—N/a	Book	—N/a
3	America Ja Sindhi	—N/a	Book	—N/a
4	Bhit Jo Shah	—N/a	Book	—N/a
5	Indus Script	—N/a	Book	The first book with 250 pages was published in Sindhi language while English version comprises 2,000 pages, covering Sindhi language's history.
6	Sindhu Jo Safar	—N/a	Book	—N/a
7	Sindh Jo Mehran	—N/a	Book	—N/a
8	Sindhu Likhat Jo Bainul Aqwami Likhatun Saan Lagapo	—N/a	Book	—N/a
9	Sindh Main Qadeem Khandran Ji Khotai	—N/a	Book	—N/a
10	Sindh Main Angrezan Ji Hikmat-i-Amli	—N/a	Book	—N/a
11	Sindh Sheehn Darya	—N/a	Book	—N/a
12	Sindh Ja Qadeem Asaar	1989	Translator	a book on Sindhi's heritage
13	Sindhu Likhat Ayein Boli	—N/a	Translator	—N/a
14	Sindh Ji Tareekh Moarukhan Ji Zubani	—N/a	Translator	—N/a
15	Sikandar Ji Kaah	—N/a	Translator	—N/a
16	Sindhu Jo Moh	—N/a	Translator	—N/a
17	Tareekh Ja Sabaq	—N/a	Translator	—N/a
18	Sindh Ja Qadeem Aasar	—N/a	Translator	—N/a
19	Thatte Ja Islami Darsgah	—N/a	Translator	—N/a
20	Thatte Ja Katib	—N/a	Translator	—N/a
21	Sindh Jean Moon Dithi	—N/a	Translator	—N/a
22	Sindhu Kinare Wisaryal Shehar	—N/a	Translator	—N/a
23	Sindh Dukhoyal Mathri	—N/a	Translator	—N/a
24	Sindh Hind Ji Qadeem Geography	—N/a	Translator	—N/a

== Awards ==
He was the recipient of the Madar-i-Watan award given by the Sindh Taraqi Pasand Party, a left-wing Pakistani political party. During Pervez Musharraf's regime, he was nominated for the Pride of Performance award by Asif Ali Zardari, but he refused to accept it in protest of son's death who was abducted by unknown persons, and found dead with torture marks on his body. In 2004, he was awarded Latif Award in recognition of his work on Shah Abdul Latif Bhittai, a Sindhi Philosopher, scholar, saint, and poet.

== Death ==
Bhanbhro died in Bachal Bhanbhro village of Hingorja, Khairpur, Pakistan near village Mothparja on 3 June 2020.

== See also ==
- Mothparja
