= Touran Mirhadi =

Iranian teacher, author and researcher

- توران میرهادی
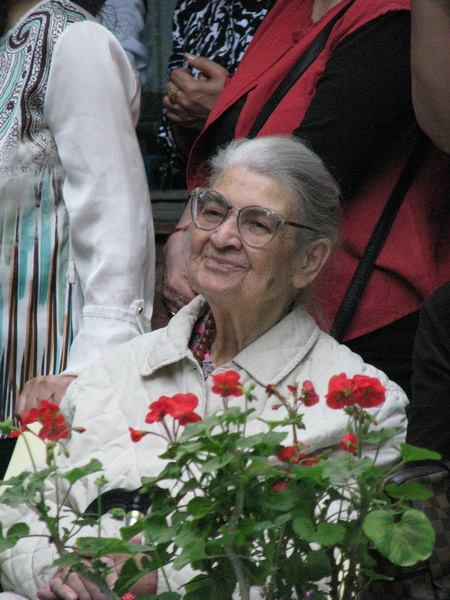
- Born: 16 June 1927; Tehran, Iran
- Died: 8 November 2016 (aged 89); Tehran, Iran
- Occupations: Teacher, researcher, author

Touran Mirhadi (Persian: توران میرهادی; 16 June 1927 – 8 November 2016) was an Iranian teacher, author and researcher. She was the founder of the Farhad School (Persian: مدرسه فرهاد) a progressive kindergarten and elementary school in Tehran which was a source of many pedagogical innovations. She was also the co-founder of The Children's Book Council of Iran (Persian: شورای کتاب کودک) and The Encyclopedia for Young People (Persian: فرهنگنامه کودکان و نوجوانان).

== Life ==
=== Early life ===
Fazlollah Mirhadi, Touran's father, left Iran in 1909 to study mechanical and structural engineering in Germany. He was part of the first wave of Iranians to study abroad after the Iranian Constitutional Revolution. Many of these young Iranians, Mirhadi among them, were interested not only in western science and technology but also progressive social and political ideas of the modern world.

Fazlollah met Touran's German mother, Greta Dietrich, during the difficult years of the First World War. In spite of Greta's strict Catholic upbringing and the objections of her parents, the two got married and returned to Iran in 1919. Touran was the fourth of five children born to Fazlollah and Greta. The young German, who was a sculptor and had studied art at the Ludwig-Maximilians-Universität München (LMU Munich), focused her life on her children but stayed connected to the arts through her association with the Kamal Almolk Institute in Tehran. Greta raised her children as Iranian but ensured that they stayed connected to Europe by teaching them German and French and tutoring them in European history, art and culture. "In Memoriam: Touran Mirhadi, 1927–2016". Bookbird: A Journal of International Children's Literature. 25 (1): 72–73. 2017. doi:10.1353/bkb.2017.0016.

When the Allies occupied Iran during the Second World War, all Iranians with connections to Germany were interned. Faslollah Mirhadi, who had played a prominent role in building the Iranian railroad, was imprisoned for 13 months during 1941 and 1942. During that time, Greta managed all the affairs of the household and kept them afloat by renting the house that later became the site for the Farhad School.

Greta's character and determination, her perspective on life and children, and her broad knowledge that her children accumulated under her tutelage, were central to Touran's worldview and her love of children and education.

=== Education ===
Starting in 1932, Touran began her formal education in schools in Tehran while her mother continued to teach her languages. Upon graduating from high school, she was admitted to Tehran University to study biology. It was there that she first met Jabbar Baghtcheban, the leading authority on pedagogy in Iran. Influenced by Baghtcheban and her own love of teaching, Mirhadi decided to abandon her studies at Tehran University and move to Europe to study child psychology and education. Her original plan was to study in Sweden but she ended up in Paris in the fall of 1946, a year after the end of the war. She was so moved by the post war devastation in Europe that she joined student groups that participated in rebuilding efforts across the continent. Her travels in Europe solidified her conviction that education, literature, arts and knowledge are keys to preventing human misery and war.

Mirhadi completed her degree in Educational Psychology at the Sorbonne University. After graduation, she continued her studies in preschool education. At the time, Paris was a center of innovation in child psychology and education. Touran had the opportunity to study with the two towering figures in the domain, Jean Piaget and Henri Wallon. She was also exposed to the works and philosophy of John Dewey and Maria Montessori.

=== Personal life ===
Mirhadi returned to Iran in 1951. She began teaching at a number of institutions in Tehran, including her former high school Noorbakhsh. At the time, Iran and the Iranian society were undergoing fundamental changes. Fresh from her experiences in Europe, Mirhadi was looking for a way to affect the course of the society. In 1952, she met Jaffar Vakili—a young major in the Iranian army—and the two married a year later. The marriage was short-lived; however, since Vakili was arrested the next year for his association with the Tudeh Party (the communist party of Iran) and its clandestine military wing. In 1954 Vakili was executed, leaving Touran to raise their son Pirooz by herself.

After this tragedy, it was the support and encouragement of her mother that helped Touran get her life back on track and pursue her aspirations. She married Mohsen Khomarloo and together the two started the Farhad School.

== Accomplishments ==
=== Farhad School ===
In 1955, Mirhadi started a kindergarten with only two classes. She was supported in this effort by her parents who provided her with a house to be used as the location of the school and helped her get the necessary license for the kindergarten. The school was named Farhad after Touran's brother who had died many years earlier in a traffic accident.

Her progressive and innovative approach to education was so quickly embraced by parents that two years later she was able to expand the school and offer first through sixth grade primary education. For most of the sixties and the seventies, the school was the incubator for research and innovations in education that were later incorporated in the national curriculum and education systems. Central to the Farhad system was the role that the library played in educating the children, broadening their knowledge and encouraging reading and critical thinking. Establishing a library in an elementary school was unprecedented in Iran in the 1950s.

Mirhadi has been a great advocate for self-expression and self-reliance of children. Class "representatives" in the school were responsible for setting the standards for behavior and dealing with conflicts. The students also helped each other by acting as tutors.

By the early 1970s, Farhad offered middle school education as well. A few years before the Iranian Revolution, the school had moved to a larger facility and was educating 1,200 students every year. After the revolution, the school, which had always been co-ed, was disbanded (as were all private schools) and writing and research became Mirhadi's main focus. Because of her work at the Farhad School, Mirhadi has been called the godmother of progressive education in Iran.

=== Children's Book Council of Iran ===
In 1963, along with a group of prominent teachers and educators, including Lily Ahi, Samin Baghtcheban and Abbas Yamini Sharif, Touran Mirhadi co-founded the Children's Book Council (CBC) of Iran. The council is an NGO focused on developing and promoting children's literature in Iran.

The council conducts and publishes research on children's literature and literacy. In 1964, CBC joined the International Board on Books for Young People (IBBY). Mirhadi was an active and leading member of the CBC, helping the council navigate the many changes in the Iranian society throughout its 50 years of existence. CBC is a reflection of her belief in the importance of books (beyond school texts) in educating children.

The Council pursues the following objective:

- To support the growth of a national literature for children
- To foster the growth of literary and information resources both in quality and quantity
- To explore ways for the better distribution of books
- To encourage Iranian production of quality works for children
- To raise the level of awareness about children's literature in society
- To enter into discourse with different social groups
- To create national models in reference works, libraries and reading culture
- To keep in touch with international trends and institutions.

The work of the council spans many areas but it is largely organized around the following three efforts:

- Children and Young People's Literature
- The Encyclopedia for Young People
- House of Librarians for the promotion of reading

In 2007, Mirhadi was honored during a ceremony at Tehran's Ibn Sina Cultural Center. Referencing her work with the Council, Keyhan Mohammadi, director of the Center, remarked that "Iranians consider Mirhadi to be the founder of children's literature" in Iran.

=== Encyclopedia for Young People ===
Work on this monumental effort started in 1980 in response to the need for a reliable and objective source for the Iranian children and young adults to learn about themselves, their country and their world. When completed, the encyclopedia will span 5,000 alphabetically arranged and fully illustrated entries in 25 volumes.

The Encyclopedia is a collection of original work developed by a large group of prominent scholars and volunteers who have been working on the material for the past 30+ years. It is intended to address the gap in sources about the history, culture and heritage of Iran. In a 2011 interview about the collection, Mirhadi says:

We were the children of a particular phase of Iranian history. It was the phase during which we were taught that we Iranians had achieved nothing culturally. And for this reason, we were told we should imitate the Europeans in everything. Intellectuals and teachers were the first to notice that the alienation from cultural roots represented a danger.

To date, 18 volumes have been published. Mirhadi was the Executive Director and Chief Editor of the Encyclopedia.

== Selected publications ==
- Index of Selected Books for Children and Young People. Touran Mirhadi. Tehran: Children's Book Council, 1968
- Research in Methods and Approaches of Education. Touran Mirhadi. Tehran: Atelier Publishing, 1983
- The one who left, the one who returned (Persian: آن که رفت، آن که آمد). Touran Mirhadi. Tehran: 1998
- Touran Mirhadi. Touran Mirhadi. Tehran: Dibayeh Publishing, 2007

== Awards and recognition ==
In 2012, the Institute for Research on the History of Children’s Literature in Iran nominated Touran Mirhadi to receive the Astrid Lindgren Memorial Award in 2013 and 2017 respectively (ALMA).

The award was established in 2002 to commemorate the Swedish writer Astrid Lindgren (renowned for the Pippi Longstocking series of children's books) and to promote children's and youth literature around the world. It is administered by the Swedish National Council for Cultural Affairs. It is the world's largest for children's and youth literature and the second-largest literature prize in the world.

In July 2015, Mirhadi was nominated again for the 2016 Astrid Lindgren Memorial Award by the Institute for Research on The History of Children's Literature in Iran (HCLI).

The documentary Lady Touran by well-known Iranian filmmakers Rakhshān Banietemad and Mojtaba Mirtahmasb was made in honor of Touran Mirhadi.
