= Samin Baghtcheban =

Iranian composer, author and translator

Samin Baghcheban
- ثمین باغچه‌بان
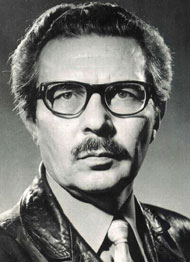
- Born: 24 september 1923; Tabriz, Iran
- Died: 19 March 2008 (aged 85); Istanbul, Turkey
- Occupation(s): Composer, author, translator
- Spouse: Evelyn Baghtcheban
- Children: 3
- Relatives: Jabbar Baghtcheban (father)
- Website: www.baghcheban.net

Samin Baghtcheban (Persian: ثمین باغچه‌بان, Turkish: Samin Bahçeban) (variations: Baghcheban, Baqcheban, Bahceban) (1923 – 19 March 2008) was an Iranian composer, author and translator.

== Biography ==
Samin Baghtcheban was born in 1925 in Tabriz, Iran, and grew up in Shiraz and Tehran, where his father established the first modern kindergartens and schools for the deaf in Iran. His father, Jabbar Baghtcheban, was a leading educator and pioneer of Persian cued speech.

Baghcheban started his music studies at the Tehran Conservatory of Music. In 1944 Samin Baghtcheban was awarded a scholarship to study composition in Ankara State Conservatory. He returned to Tehran in 1949 and started teaching at the Conservatory.

He was married to the opera singer, Evelyn Baghtcheban, whom he met while studying in Ankara.

In 1984 he moved to Turkey with his family where he continued his activities and composed several new pieces, some of which were performed by Manouchehr Sahbai in Switzerland.

He died on 19 March 2008 in Istanbul.

== Compositions ==
Throughout his career he composed numerous pieces inspired by the Persian folk music or mythology. His most popular work is Rangin Kamoon (Rainbow), a collection of compositions for children (for choire and orchestra) which was recorded in 1978 in Vienna. Other Works:

- Persian Compositions for Voice and Piano (including 4 pieces: 1- Ruba'i No. 1: Do Zolfoonet (Your two braids) (1950) Text: Baba-Taher (11th-century Persian poet). 2- To Ra Mikham (I want you) (1952) Text: Folklore. 3- Sorood-e Saba (Saba's song) (1956) Text: Sa'di (13th-century poet). 4- Gahvareh-ye Khali (Empty cradle) (1957) Text: the composer), published in 2018, on the 10th death anniversary of the composer. The first two pieces, Ruba'i No. 1: Do Zolfoonet (Your two braids) and To Ra Mikham (I want you) were recorded on the album Sounds of Ancestors by Anousha Nazari.
- Sholeyl (for string orchestra)
- Boumivar (in 3 movements) for orchestra.
- Chaharshanbeh-Souri

Baghcheban also arranged various Persian folk songs for the choir. Some of his arrangements were performed by Tehran Choral Group and the Farah Choir in the 1960s and 1970s.

== Literary works ==
Between 1948 and 1979, in addition to his composition activities, he wrote and translated several books and articles. Baghtcheban translated several books by Turkish authors Nazim Hikmet, Yaşar Kemal and introduced the humorist Aziz Nesin to Iranians.

In 1963, along with a group of prominent teachers and educators, including Lily Ahi, Touran Mirhadi and Abbas Yamini Sharif, Baghtcheban confounded the Children's Book Council (CBC) of Iran. The council is an NGO focused on developing and promoting children's literature in Iran.
