= Evelyn Baghtcheban =

Evelyn Baghcheban
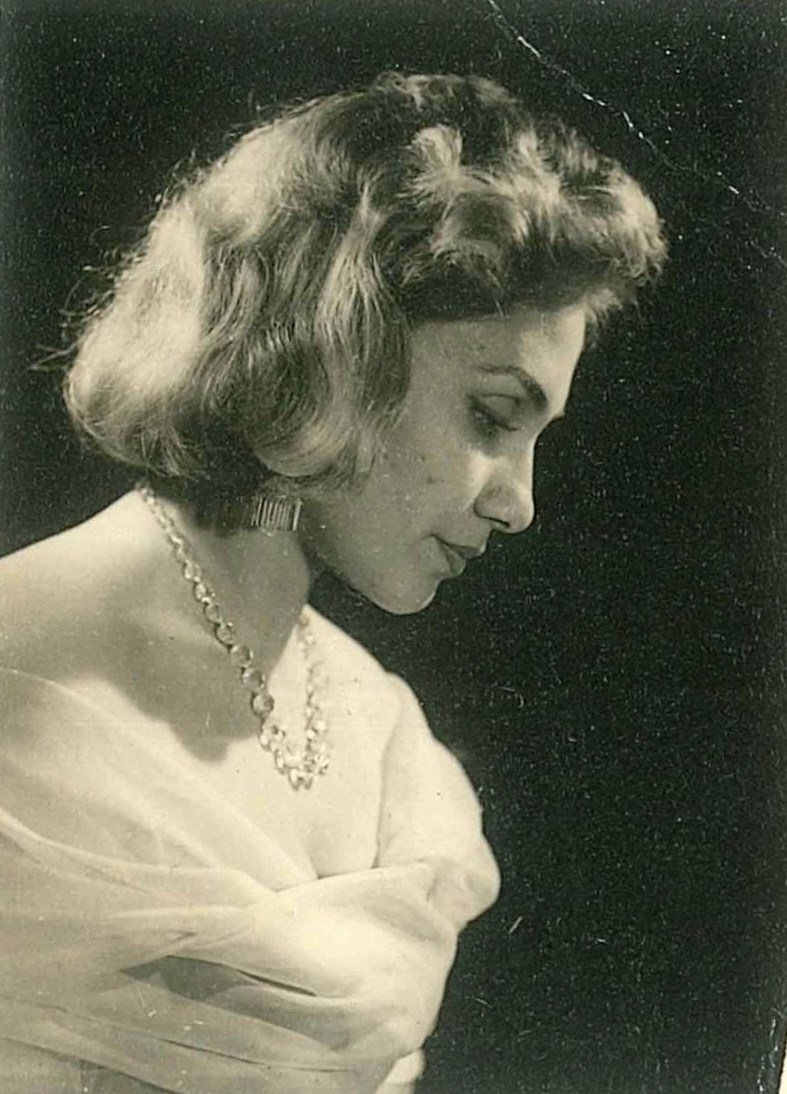
- Born: June 8, 1928; Mersin, Turkey
- Died: October 31, 2010 (aged 82); Istanbul, Turkey
- Occupations: Opera singer, voice teacher, choir conductor
- Known for: Founder and Soloist of Tehran Opera House, founded the Tehran Choral Group, Farah Choir
- Spouse: Samin Baghtcheban
- Website: www.baghcheban.net

Evelyn Baghcheban (variations: Evlin Baghtcheban, Baqcheban, Bahceban, born as Evlin Örge) (Persian: اولین باغچه‌بان, June 8, 1928 – October 31, 2010) was a Turkish-Persian opera singer (mezzo-soprano) and one of the soloists and co founder of Tehran Opera House at Rudaki Hall, and founded the Tehran Choral Group and Farah Choir. She also taught singing at the Tehran Conservatory of Music, where her pupils included Hossein Sarshar, Pari Zanganeh, and Sudabeh Tajbakhsh.

In 1967 Evlin Baghcheban founded the Tehran Choral Group. Choral music of the coronation ceremony of Mohammad-Reza Shah was performed by this group, conducted by Evlin Baghcheban at Golestan Palace. In 1973, Farah Pahlavi Charity Foundation commissioned Evlin Baghcheban to establish a conservatory of music in Tehran for orphan children. In this school, Baghcheban organized a choral group called the Farah Choir. This choir recorded two albums in Vienna, Austria in 1978: "Rainbow" (compositions for children by Samin Baghchenan) and "Choral Music from Persia" (folk songs arranged by Rubik Gregorian and Samin Baghcheban).

== Tribute ==
On the 10th occasion of Evlin Baghcheban's death, her son, Kaveh, published a book entitled "The Days Tehran had Opera" containing old photos, historical documents and concert programmes of his mother with a CD of rare recording at Tehran Opera House in the 1960s.

== Early life ==
Evlin Baghtcheban (née Örge Salem) was born in Mersin, Turkey to a French mother and an Assyrian-Lebanese father. In 1950 she was married to the Iranian composer Samin Baghtcheban whom she met when they were both students at the Ankara State Conservatory. Shortly after the 1979 Islamic Revolution Baghcheban moved to Istanbul. She is survived by three sons Rouin, Kaveh and Farhang.
