= Pari Zangeneh =

Iranian opera and folk singer (born 1939)

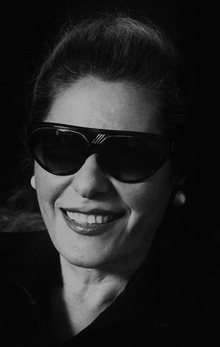

Background information
- Born: Parirokh Shahyalani; 2 December 1939 (age 86); Kashan, Imperial State of Iran
- Genres: Opera, folk
- Occupation: Singer
- Instrument: Vocals

Pari Zangeneh (Persian: پری زنگنه) (born 2 December 1939, Kashan, Iran) is an Iranian opera and folk singer (Spinto soprano). She was taught by Evelyn Baghtcheban. She lost her eyesight in a car accident.

== Early life and career ==
She was born as Parirokh Shahilani on December 2, 1939, to a Kashani father and a Gilani mother.

Zanganeh graduated from the Tehran Conservatory of Music in the opera department. She received her primary education in Tehran and took her first singing lessons with Nasrollah Zarrinpanjeh, then went to the Tehran Conservatory of Music. She studied opera with Turkish-Persian mezzo soprano Evelyn Baghcheban, and then traveled to Italy, Germany, and Austria to complete her studies. She also studied Iranian folk music and reconstructed Iranian traditional songs.

Her version of the traditional song "Gonjeshkake Ashi Mashi" appeared in the 1974 Iranian film. The Deer.

In 1977, she was blinded when a car accident sent glass into her eyes. She continued performing worldwide, including at Lincoln Center in New York, Herbst Theatre in San Francisco, Harvard University in Boston, Hercules Hall in Munich, and at various venues throughout Japan.

Zanganeh has written several books for children and published numerous articles and songs. She took five years to write and compile a comprehensive Persian-language dictionary, The Voice of Names from Iran Zamin. In 2003, Zanganeh published the book Sing with Me, Too. Other books by her include Lullabies of Fairy Zanganeh, Songs of Fairy Zanganeh for All Ages and Speech in Joy: Big Words in a Small Book.

Zanganeh holds concerts for the benefit of cultural organizations for the blind throughout Iran and the world. Zanganeh, whose responsibilities included being the head of cultural and social relations for the blind in Iran, received the title of International Goodwill Ambassador in 2009. In the years after the revolution, her activities in Iran were limited to special concerts for women.

== Personal life ==
She became known as Pari Zanganeh after marrying Hossein Zanganeh, the owner of the Air Taxi Company. Their marriage, which ended in a car accident, produced two daughters. One of their daughters, Shahpari Zanganeh, was the wife of Adnan Khashoggi, the Saudi Arabian arms dealer and billionaire. The couple's other daughter, Amira Zanganeh, is a Hollywood actress.
