= Read with Me =

Iranian literacy program

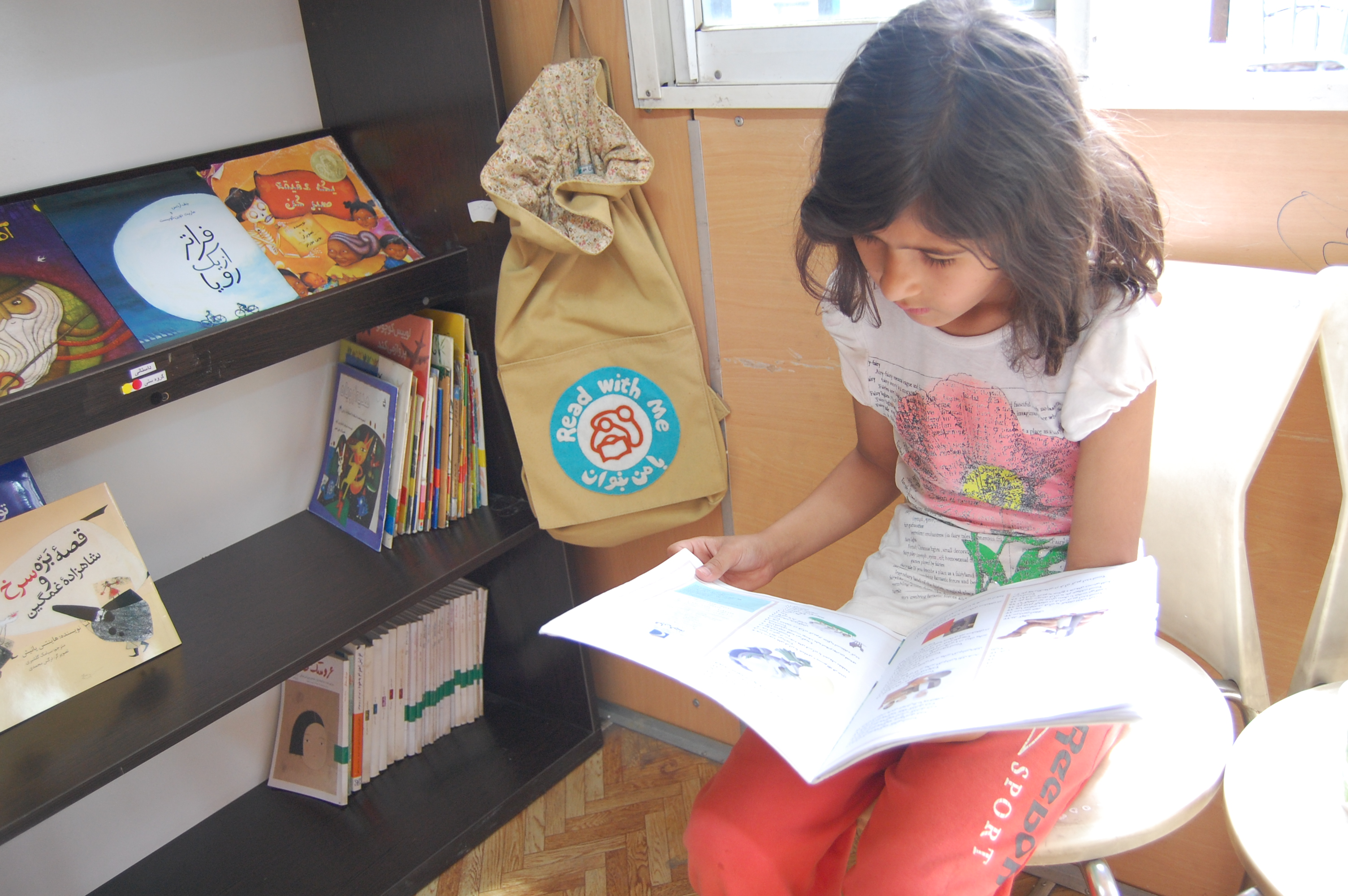
A child reading a book in a library-connex in Ashrafabad village, Shahr-e Ray.

Read with Me is a reading promotion project in Iran for disadvantaged children in marginal areas of big cities and those living in remote and deprived areas of the country. The project is designed and implemented by the Institute for Research on the History of Children's Literature in Iran.

Read with Me was started as a pilot project in 2010 in a marginal area of south-east Tehran close to brick kilns where some 120 Afghan families lived. Since then, the project has been expanded to 19 provinces in Iran covering over 60,000 children and young adults and more than 2500 teachers, preschool tutors or volunteers. The project is funded by donations and mainly run by volunteers. In 2016, a group of tutors from Mazar-e-Sharif, Afghanistan joined the project covering about 1000 children in this city and nearby villages.

== The Course of Action ==
Quality books suitable for children, based on their age-group, literacy level, cultural and social condition, are selected and packed in book-bags. In every package or bag, there are handbooks for the teachers or interested parents to guide them. Two-day training workshops are organized every 3 months for teachers, librarians, and volunteers.

Reading aloud sessions are held in classes. Teachers encourage discussion and exchange of views about the story, aiming to develop critical thinking. Reading sessions are accompanied by related art and craft activities, with an emphasis on role-playing and drama. To monitor and improve the implementation, all activities are documented for further evaluation of the project.

The project has achieved to establish a system that motivates children to read

== Awards and nominations ==
=== Won ===
IBBY-Asahi Reading Promotion Award 2016

=== Nominated ===
UNESCO-Japan Prize on Education for Sustainable Development

Astrid Lindgren Memorial Award
