= Mothparja =

Village in Sindh, Pakistan

Mothparja موٿپارجا موتھپارجا Muhammad Moryal Sahito
- Village
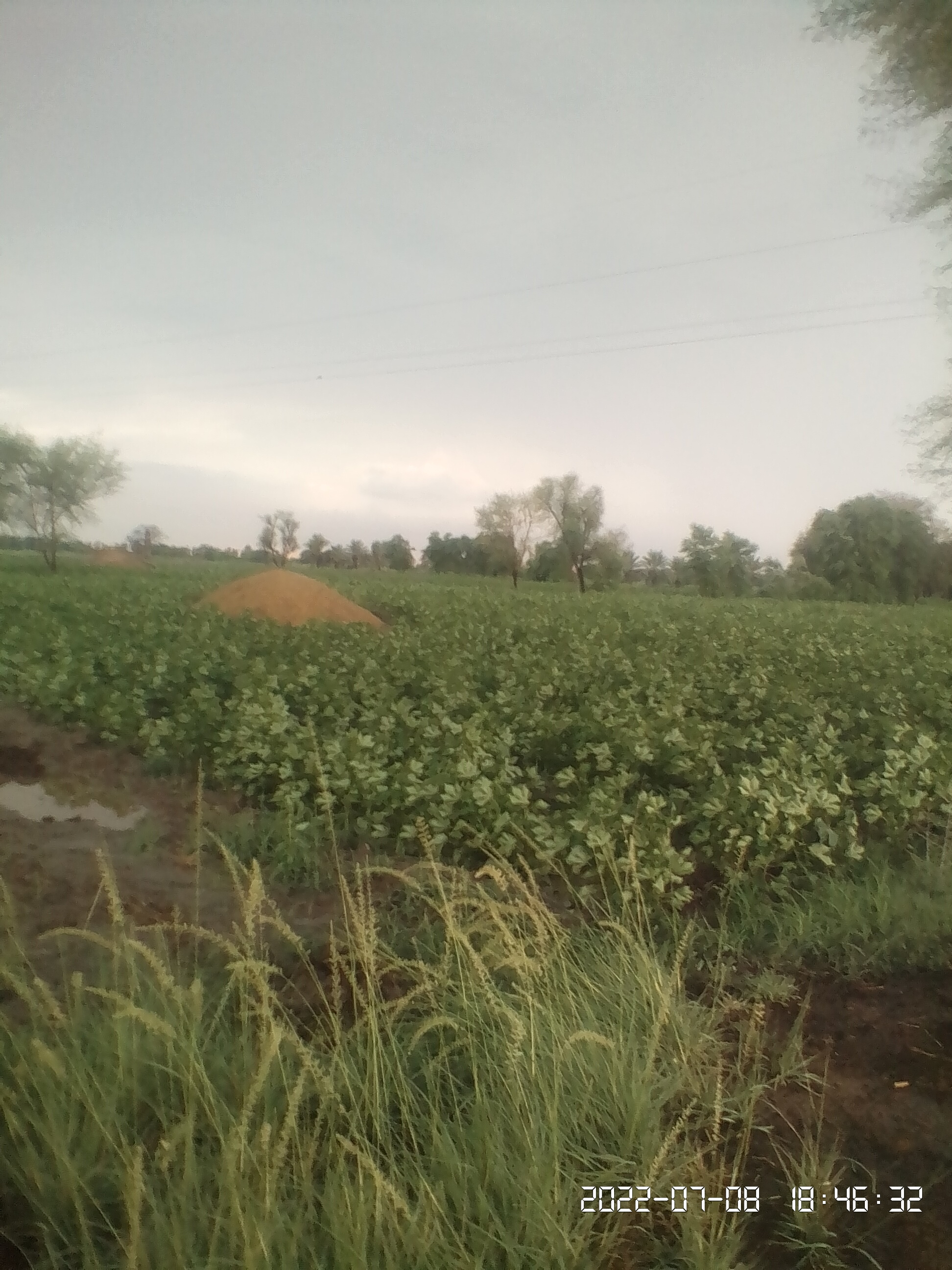

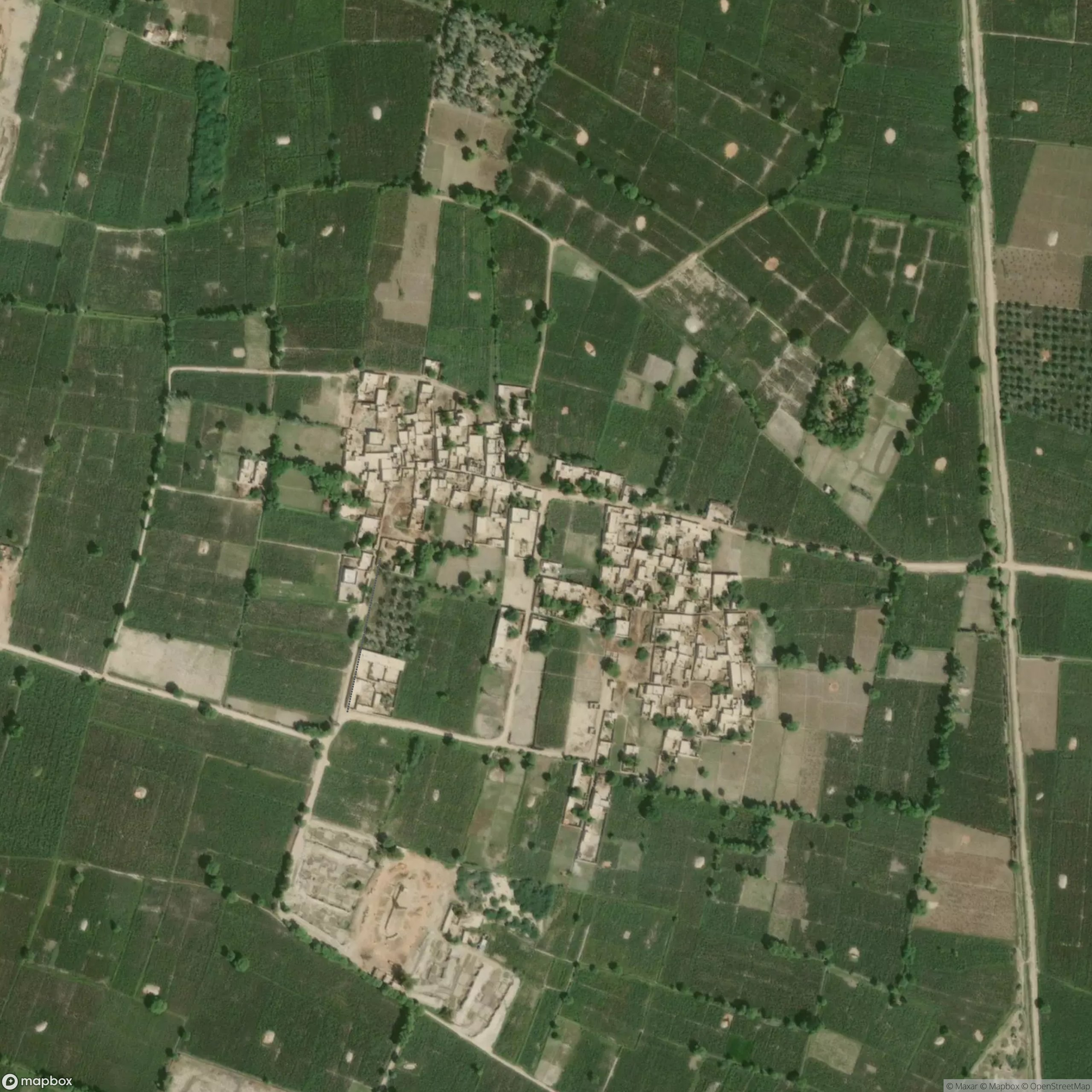
- Map of the village of Mothparja

- Location within Sindh Location within Pakistan Location within Asia
- Coordinates: 27°09′59″N 68°24′13″E
- Country: Pakistan
- Province: Sindh
- Division: Sukkur
- District: Khairpur
- Taluka: Sobhodero
- Union Council: Rasoolabad
- First settled: 1790
- After the flood: 1810
- Incorporated as a village: 1900
- Founder: Muhammad Moryal Sahito
- Named for: Muhammad Moryal Sahito
- Sub-villages: Mohalas: •Sahita Mohala; •Channa Mohala; •Mangi Mohala

Government
  - Type: U.C Government
  - Body: Government of U.C Rasoolabad
  - Chairman: Abdul Qadir Memon (G.D.A)
  - Vice Chairman: Muhammad Aalam Dahri
  - Councilor: Raza Muhammad Rajpur

Area
  - Village: 0.051 km^{2} (0.020 sq mi)
  - Land: 0.048 km^{2} (0.019 sq mi)
  - Water: 0.003 km^{2} (0.0012 sq mi)
  - Rural: 0.048 km^{2} (0.019 sq mi)
- Elevation: 50 m (160 ft)

Population (2017 census)
  - Village: 1,000
  - Density: 21,000/km^{2} (54,000/sq mi)
  - Rural: 1,000
  - Rural density: 21,000/km^{2} (54,000/sq mi)
- Demonym: Mothparjain

Religion
  - Islam: 99%
  - Hinduism: 0.99%
  - Atheist: 0.01%

Languages
  - Sindhi: 99%
  - Others: 1%
- Time zone: UTC+5 (PST)
- Postal Code: 66191

Mothparja (Sindhi: موٿپارجا, Urdu: موتھپارجا) also called Village Muhammad Moryal Sahito (Muhammad Moryal Sahito Jo Goth) is a village in district Khairpur in Sindh province of Pakistan. It has three sub-villages (Mohala). Most of the people in the village are Sahita, but some others are Channa. This village is located 2 km away from National Highway 5 and 1 1/2 km away from Rasoolabad town. It is basically an agricultural village except some villagers who have government jobs.

== Etymology ==
The word "Mothparja" is the combination of two Sindhi words {Mothparja=Mot(Death:موت)+Par(Cross:پار)=To cross the death: موت پار ڪرڻ}. Legend has it that about two hundred years ago the villagers of this village were living near the shrine of a famous saint. There was a disease epidemic which killed a number of people. Due to this the villagers left there and came to reside here. The people who were safe had crossed the death, meaning they had been saved.

The village is also known as Village Muhammad Moryal Sahito, after the first head of the village. The name Moryal Sahito was given to the village after the independence of Pakistan and is only used in revenue of fields. For all other proposes the name Mothparja is used.

== History ==
The history of this village is about 2-3 hundred years old. In early ages there were only 2-3 houses located approximately 500m far from the current village.

=== 18th century ===
At the end of the 18th century, some people came to live near the shrine of a saint. The people were the ancestors of the villagers of this village. There were only 2–3 houses. They were Sahito by caste. Their houses were made from wood and leaves of date palm trees. Around their houses there was only a big dense forest.

=== 19th century ===
In the beginning of the 19th century there came a flood in Sindh which destroyed all the houses in the village but still the villagers were safe and sound. Then they migrated from there and settled near a shrine of a saint. They lived there many years but they didn't adopt much change.

=== 20th century ===
In the first years of the 20th century a pandemic (virus) attacked the village and killed a number of people. So, the head of the village, Muhammad Moryal Sahito, decided to leave that place. After that they migrated from there and settled here, where now the village is. When they came here already a group of people was living here called Mangi. After the independence of Pakistan from British Government a group of people migrated from the Khan Wahan village and settled here, they were Channa.

== Geography ==
=== Climate ===
Mothparja has a hot desert climate (Köppen climate classification BWh), characterised by extremely hot and hazy summers with warm winters.Mothparja is known for its extremely hot summer. Wind speed is low throughout the year, and sunshine is abundant. Summer temperatures regularly surpass 50 °C (122 °F). Dry heat is experienced starting April to early June until the Monsoon season starts to arrive. Monsoons in Mothparja are not very wet, but bring high dew points, resulting in high heat indices. Monsoons recede by September, but it is not until late October that the short lived autumn season is experienced before the onset of the region's cool winters. The average annual rainfall of Mothparja is 87.6 mm (3.45 in) and mainly occurs in the monsoon season. The highest annual rainfall ever is 375 mm (14.8 in), recorded in 1978 and the lowest annual rainfall ever is 0 mm in 1941.

Climate data for Khairpur
Month	Jan	Feb	Mar	Apr	May	Jun	Jul	Aug	Sep	Oct	Nov	Dec	Year
Record high °C (°F)	31.0 (87.8)	38.0 (100.4)	45.0 (113.0)	49.0 (120.2)	50.5 (122.9)	50.5 (122.9)	46.5 (115.7)	44.5 (112.1)	43.5 (110.3)	41.6 (106.9)	37.2 (99.0)	31.0 (87.8)	50.5 (122.9)
Mean daily maximum °C (°F)	24.8 (76.6)	26.2 (79.2)	32.4 (90.3)	39.2 (102.6)	43.3 (109.9)	43.2 (109.8)	41.0 (105.8)	39.1 (102.4)	37.9 (100.2)	35.6 (96.1)	30.3 (86.5)	24.8 (76.6)	34.8 (94.7)
Daily mean °C (°F)	16.5 (61.7)	18.2 (64.8)	23.9 (75.0)	30.1 (86.2)	34.6 (94.3)	35.7 (96.3)	34.7 (94.5)	33.2 (91.8)	31.4 (88.5)	27.8 (82.0)	21.7 (71.1)	16.5 (61.7)	27.0 (80.7)
Mean daily minimum °C (°F)	8.3 (46.9)	10.2 (50.4)	15.4 (59.7)	21.1 (70.0)	25.9 (78.6)	28.3 (82.9)	28.4 (83.1)	27.3 (81.1)	24.9 (76.8)	20.0 (68.0)	13.2 (55.8)	8.3 (46.9)	19.3 (66.7)
Record low °C (°F)	1.0 (33.8)	0.5 (32.9)	3.0 (37.4)	9.5 (49.1)	16.5 (61.7)	19.5 (67.1)	20.8 (69.4)	17.5 (63.5)	19.5 (67.1)	12.4 (54.3)	5.0 (41.0)	−1.5 (29.3)	−1.5 (29.3)
Average precipitation mm (inches)	3.5 (0.14)	7.0 (0.28)	6.8 (0.27)	5.7 (0.22)	5.0 (0.20)	4.5 (0.18)	20.8 (0.82)	20.4 (0.80)	0.9 (0.04)	3.0 (0.12)	0.6 (0.02)	9.4 (0.37)	87.6 (3.46)
Average precipitation days	0.3	0.6	0.8	0.4	0.4	0.5	2.0	0.6	0.1	0.1	0.1	0.3	6.2
Average relative humidity (%)	52	48	39	28	29	38	49	56	52	46	47	52	45
Mean monthly sunshine hours	276	294	318	345	363	372	357	336	321	309	288	276	3,855
Source 1: PMD (1991–2020)
Source 2: climate-data

== Education ==
Before the independence of Pakistan, residents of the village used to get only informal education i.e. Quranic lessons which were given by a hired Mullah in the Mosque. There were no educational facilities even there was not a single school in the vicinity or nearby villages. But without secondary education, and awareness about English language or formal education village would not develop. So, some villagers of this village went on a journey to get knowledge and do something for this village. After completing their education they came to their village and struggled to build a school in the village. After their tireless efforts they made it and in 1980s the boys primary school was built by Sindh Government. After this a girls primary school was also built. In those days only some children went to school (most of boys). Slowly and gradually people started to send their children to school. In 2000s the boys primary school was rebuilt.

There are two schools in Mothparja:

- Government Boys Primary School
- Government Girls Primary School

== Gallery ==
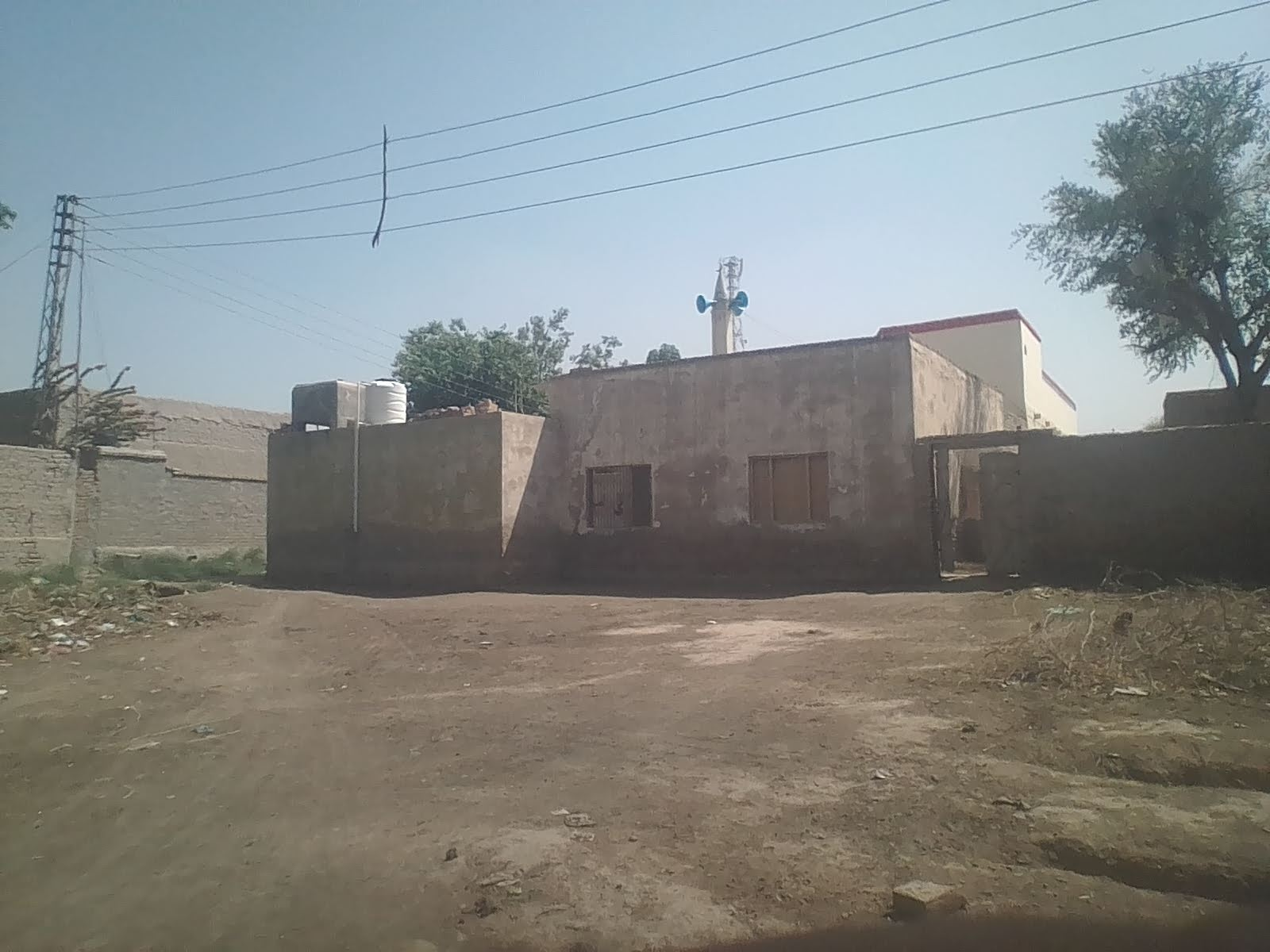
Jamia Muhammadi Mosque Sahita Mohala (exterior)

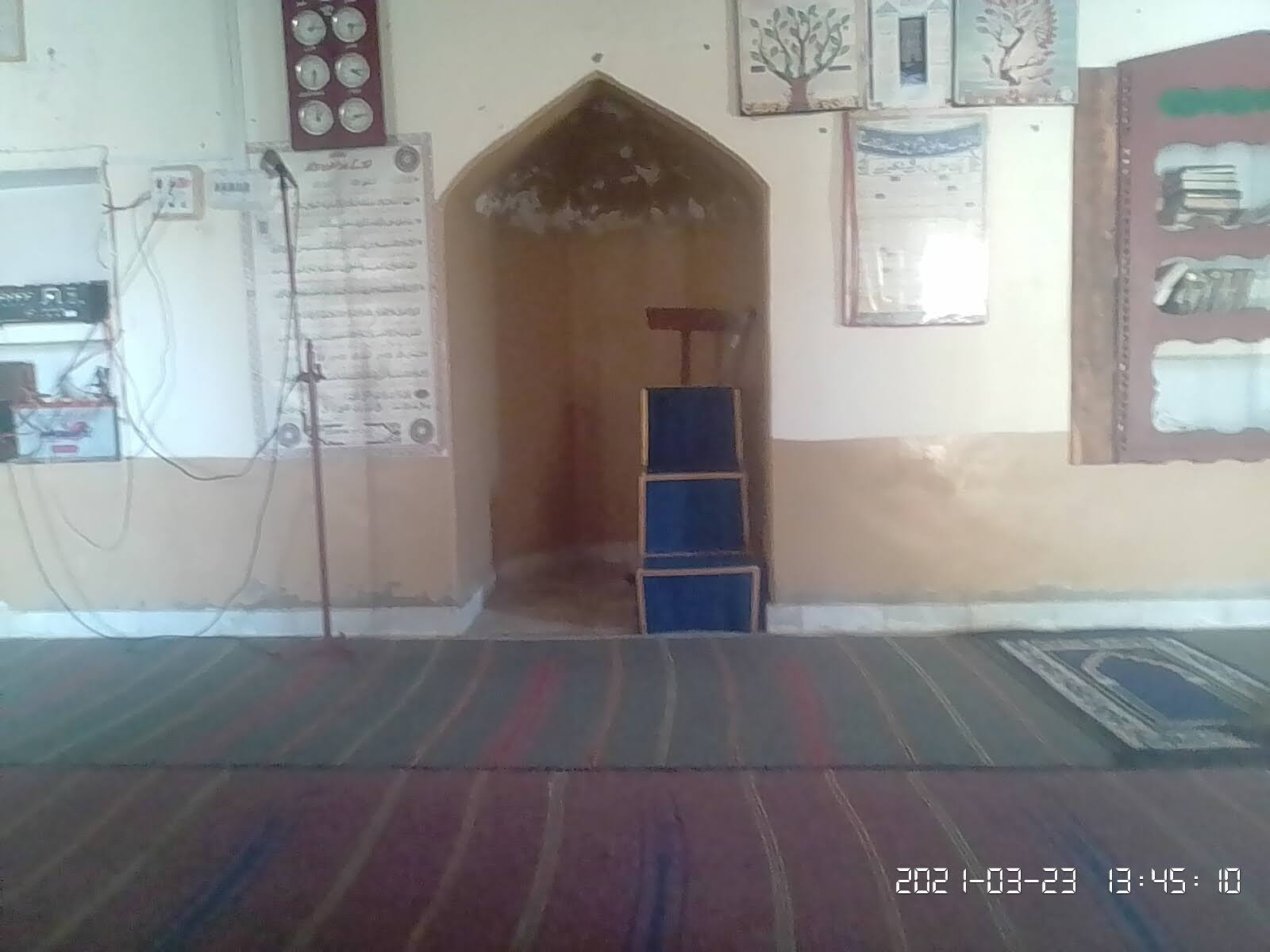
Jamia Muhammadi Mosque Sahita Mohala (interior)

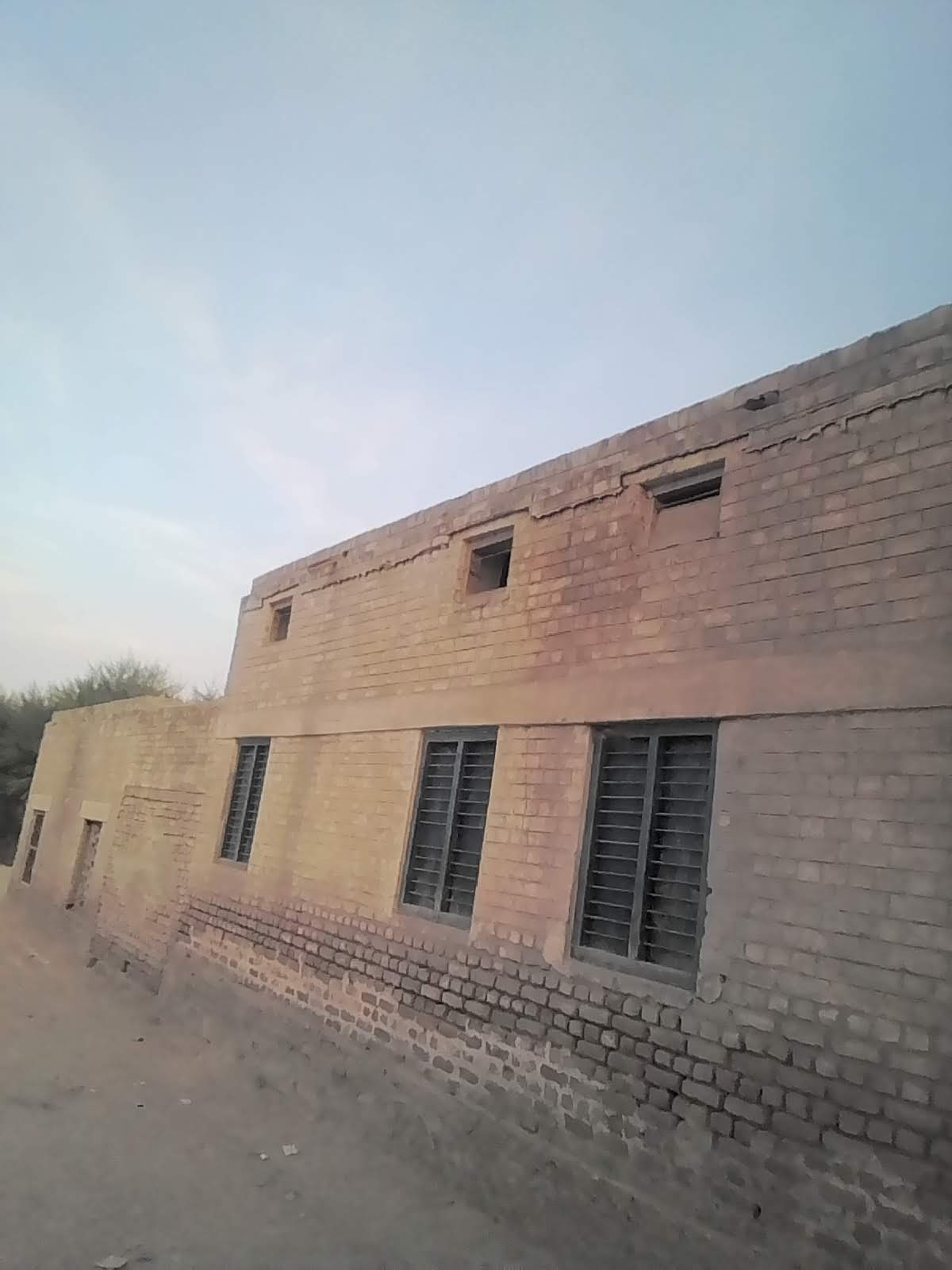
Government Boys Primary School (exterior)

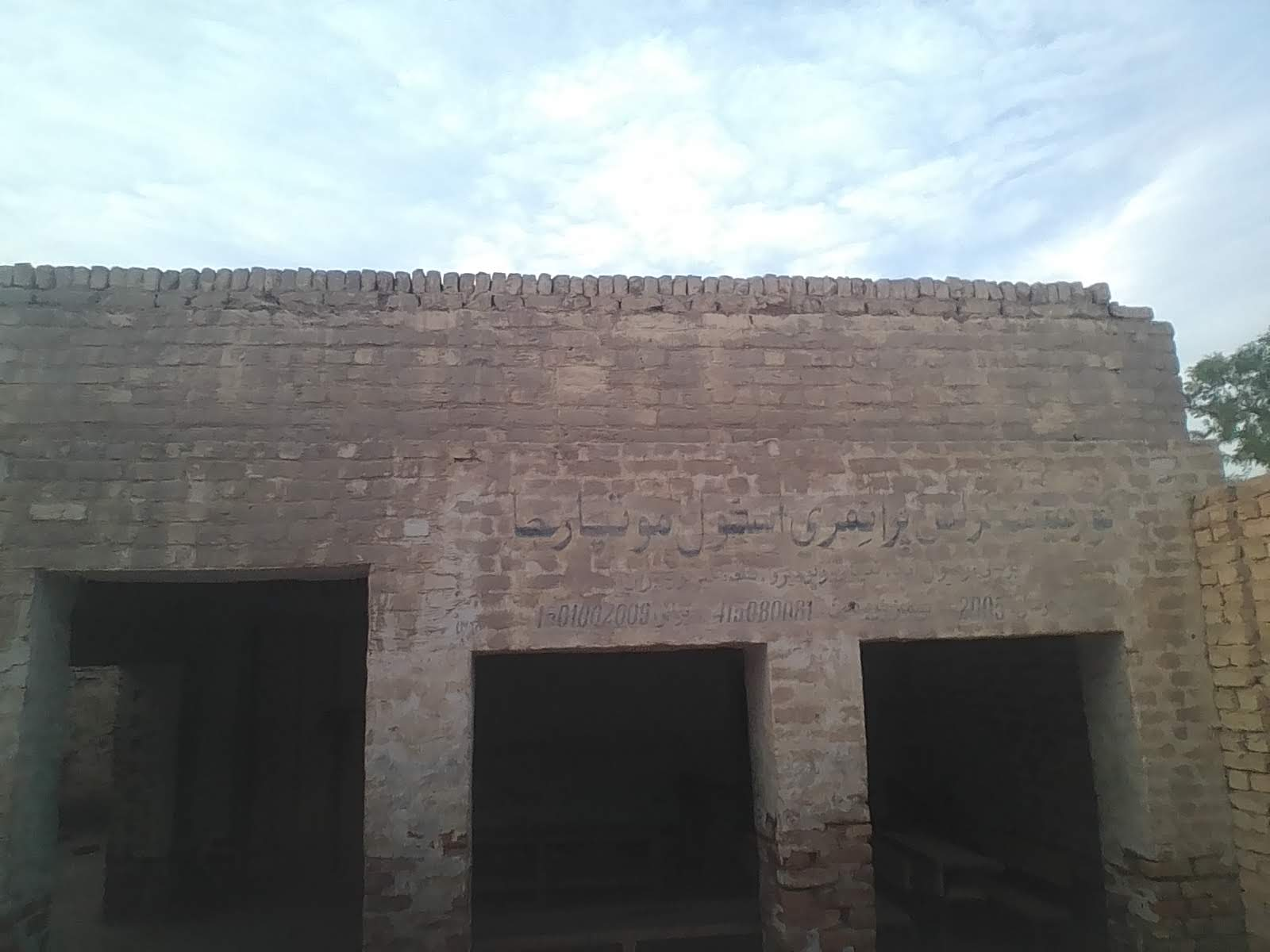
Government Girls Primary School (interior)

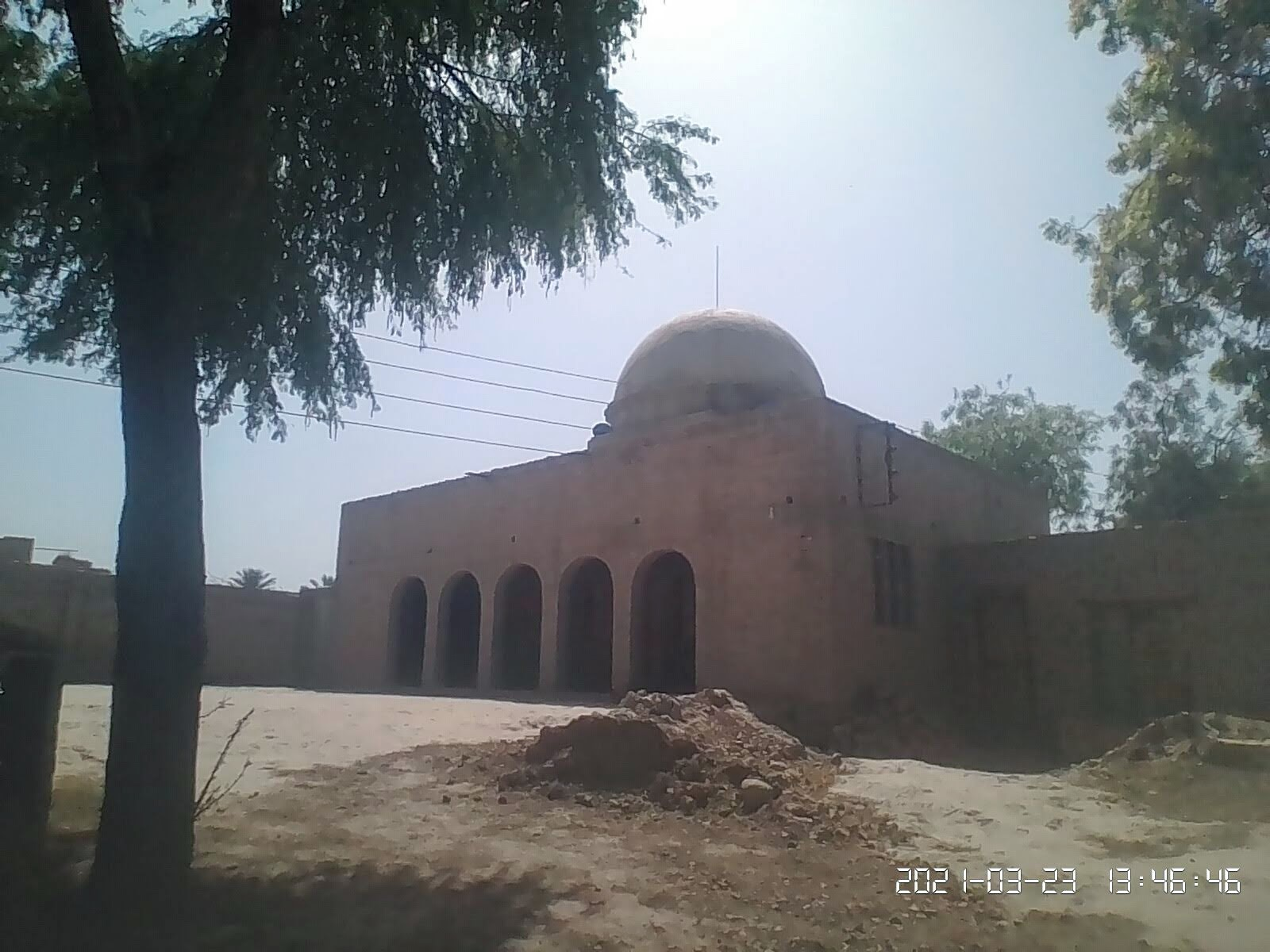
Madani Mosque, Mothparja (exterior)

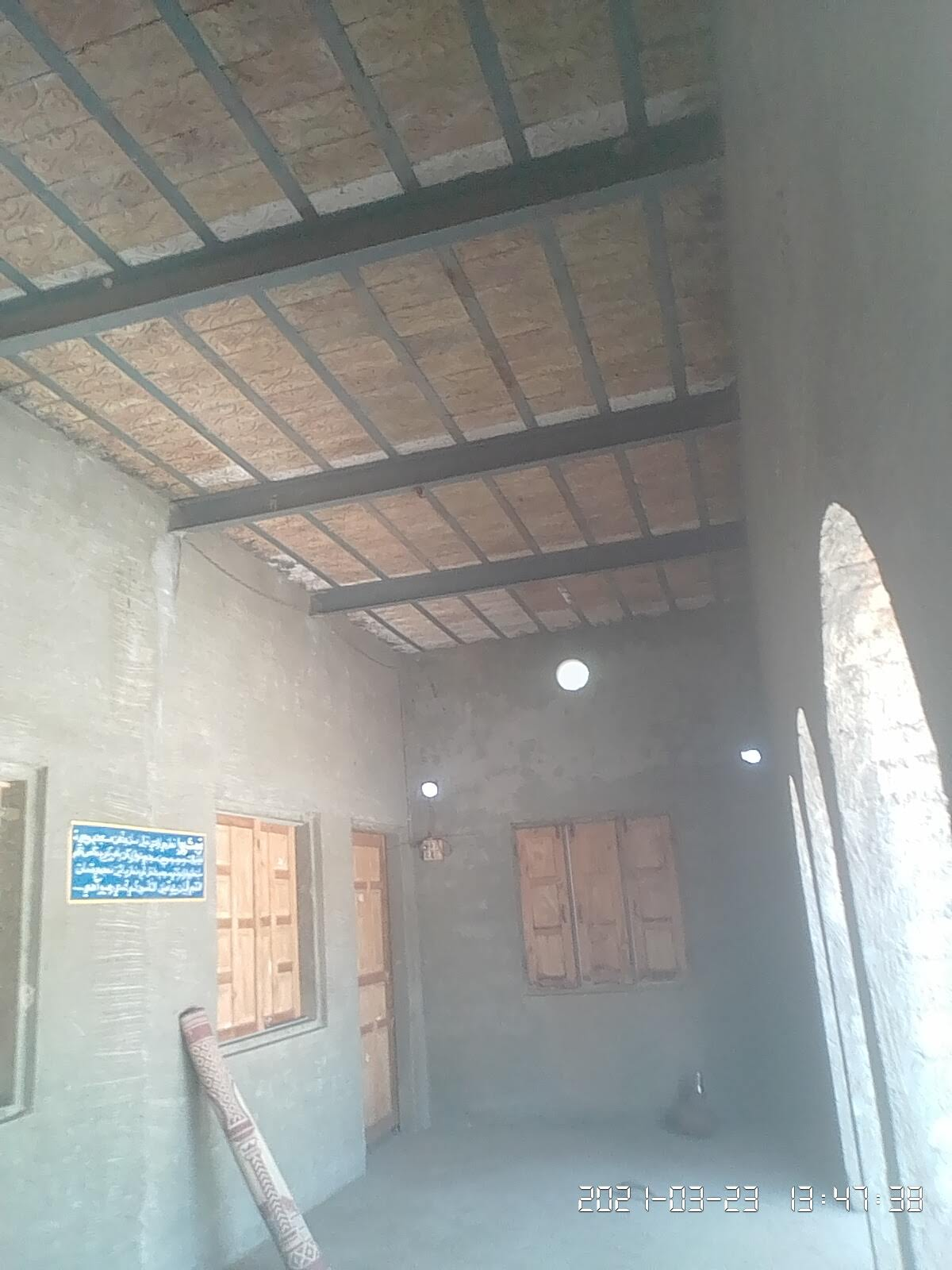
Madani Mosque, Mothparja (interior)
