= The History of Children's Literature in Iran =

Iranian research project

The History of Children's Literature in Iran (HCLI) is a research project undertaken by The Institute for Research on the History of Children's Literature in Iran. Started in 1997, the project spread over 10 volumes.

== About The Research Project ==
The HCLI project includes such issues as: the appearance of culture and literature in Iran; the formation of oral literature and its components, followed by the appearance of children's literature in ancient times; after Islam, in the early part of the 20th century, and its development up to the Islamic Revolution in 1978.

HCLI will analyze the concept of childhood, educational ideas and the literature of each period under consideration. Also the broader socio-economic and cultural situations will be reviewed in light of historical developments. Sample text illustrations from the different periods will complete the discussions and provide a unique anthology.

Some of the questions to be answered by the HCLI are as follows: When did Iranian society start considering children as different from adults; how have thinkers defined the child and its special needs; when did children's literature begin; and in which historical period were the first books produced. These and many other questions will be raised and discussed in light of existing historical documents. Research in pre-Islamic and Islamic works, makes it clear that there are very few texts addressed directly to children. However, many passages can be found in the general literary works that are written for children and are clearly addressed to the young reader. This has been discussed extensively in volumes1 and 2 of the HCLI.

The turning point occurs in the late 19th century and early 20th century, when such new factors enter the scene: new educational concepts, continuity of oral literature and folklore, development of a more simple Persian prose, the advent of translations from the West, the start of the printing industry in Iran, establishment of new schools, the study of child psychology, and the rise of pioneer personalities as early publishers of books for children. As an extensive research project, the HCLI will also review the children's literature of Iran's minorities such as the Azaris, the Kurds, Zoroastrians, Christians and Jews.

== Research method ==
The History of Children's Literature is an extensive research project based on the historical status of children in Iranian society, prevailing educational views and the growth of children's literature. Children's Literature in Iran is a thin branch of the immense and aged tree of Iranian arts and culture. Nevertheless, by researching this thin branch, a whole new field has stretched before us. We have chosen a comprehensive method for this research, which reaches back to 3,000 years ago. The project begins with the oral tradition, focusing on ancient times, when literature was narrated for children generation by generation.

In 1996, when we started this project, we weren't aware of its extent and thought we could finish the history in one or two volumes. It didn't take a long time, however, to realize we were wrong. After studying documents, we reached the conclusion that Iran has one of the richest treasuries of children's literature in the world. We began by posing many questions, including: what kinds of texts are considered children's literatures? How far can we go back in accessing the earliest documents? What is the relationship between oral children's literature and formal texts? And, how could children's literature be coordinated in relation to historical eras? To answer these questions we have chosen the method of analyzing ideas from the general to the specific. This method helps us see every specific text in relation to the general context. In the first chapters of every volume (period), general, historical and cultural aspects of each period are analyzed. Then, we have surveyed the status of Iranian children and evaluated educational attitudes. For example, it was much easier to understand the emergence of courtesy literature written for princes when we learned about the educational philosophy of that period. After surveying general societal aspects, we have addressed children's literature specifically. We have tried to determine the genre of every single document in addition its historical status.

The most difficult and complicated process in this project was recognizing, finding and accessing books and documents. The old documents and texts related to children's literature were much dispersed and because this research is the first in this field, there is no comprehensive bibliography of children's books. We had to look over all bibliographies, biographies, and newspapers and magazines, which were published during a specific era to find and prepare a list of children's books from that time. In finding every unique document, we have searched many secondhand bookstores in Tehran and other cities in addition to all public and private libraries. We have started this research with the oral tradition, because it is not allocated to a specific time and it links ancient times to the contemporary era. In this research it was rather impossible to include the oral literature of all ethnic groups. We found that the children's oral literature was a rich treasure preserved by each of the dozens of the Iran's ethnic groups. Even this small sample expresses the variety and the extent of children's oral literature. The diversity of Iranian culture is so outstanding that we could survey only a small part of it.

Because Iran is an ancient land with diverse and dispersed ethnic groups, we have extended our research beyond children's written literature in Persian. In our research we include Armenian, Assyrian, Azari, Kurdish and Zoroastrian children's literature. Different margin notes were included in relation with the main text such as: “interview with history”, “literary and historical surveys”, “selected texts” and tables and charts. These additions help familiarize the reader with historical phenomena by offering different perspectives. For example, in addition to helping the reader comprehend the given analysis, “selected texts” allow them to access rare old documents; “Interview with history” where people who were involved with children's literature, speak about their experience, allows the reader the opportunity to consider views other than the main writer's. The History of Children's Literature is not a historical report of the development of children's literature in Iran. It is an analytical study that not only surveys the changes in children's status during the time, but also shows the evolution of the educational system that helped children's literature emerge.

== Topics of each volumes ==
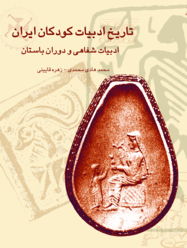

=== Volume 1 ===
==== Part one ====
- The narration of a territory's childhood,
- The appearance of culture and literature in Iran,
- Children's status in the pre-historical period,
- Characteristics of folk culture,
- Narration and the storytelling tradition,
- Lullabies, Children's rhymes,
- Rhythmic fables, Folktales.

==== Part two ====
- Iran from the Mede era through the Sassanid era,
- Intercultural communication between Iran and its neighbors,
- The Iranian child in the time of empires,
- Educational views in the Zoroastrian period,
- Religious and mythical tales,
- Courtesy literature (books of advice),
- National and epic stories,
- Children's books illustration in Mani's time.

=== Volume 2 ===
- Iran in the Islamic Period,
- Children's status in the Islamic Period,
- The education system in the Islamic Period,
- Educational views in the Islamic Period,
- Religious tales,
- National and epic tales,
- Courtesy literature (books of advice),
- Translations,
- Children's books illustration in the Islamic Period.

=== Volumes 3 & 4 ===
- Iran in modern times,
- The relationship between Iran and the West,
- The appearance of the printing industry in Iran,
- Children's status in the Qajar period,
- The traditional education system (maktabkhāneh),
- The story-telling tradition,
- Culturally progressive pioneers in the Qajar period,
- Educationally progressive pioneers in the Qajar period,
- The new education system and its textbooks,
- The first textbooks (lithographs),
- The first literary children's books (lithographs),
- The translation movement,
- The pioneers of modern children's literature (writers and poets),
- Children's dramatic literature,
- Children's translated literature,
- Children's books illustration.

=== Volumes 5, 6, 7 ===
- The Pahlavi period,
- Iran in the first and second Pahlavi periods (1921–1961),
- The cultural situation (1921–1961),
- Children's status (1921–1961),
- The new and modern education system,
- Jabbar Baghcheban, the founder of modern children's literature in Iran,
- Children's books authors,
- The appearance of children's poems,
- The appearance of children's magazines,
- Children's books illustrations,
- Children's books publishers,
- Gathering and retelling of old folk and classic literature,
- First children's book fairs (exhibitions),
- First children's books prizes,
- Translated children's books,
- Children's dramatic literature,
- Children's book criticism,
- The first children's libraries,
- Children's books illustration.

=== Volumes 8, 9, 10 ===
- The Cultural situation from 1960 to 1978,
- Children's status from 1960 to 1978,
- Flourishing of children's literature,
- Educational theories in this period,
- The educational system in this period,
- The appearance of children's literature institutes: the Institute for the Intellectual Development of Children and Young Adults; the Children's Book Council of Iran,
- Religious attitudes in children's literature,
- Specialized private children's books publishers,
- Children's books translations in this period,
- Children's dramatic literature,
- Children's book criticism,
- Children's magazines,
- Writers, poets, and translators of children's literature,
- The retelling of old and classical literature for children,
- National and international prizes for Iranian children's books,
- National and international seminars about children's literature in Iran.

== Sources ==
- The History Of children's literature in Iran, M.H.Mohammadi& Zohreh Ghaeni, Cheesta Publishing Co, Tehran, 2001–2007
