= Jabbar Baghtcheban =

Iranian language educator (1886–1966)

Mirza Jabbar Baghcheban
- جبار باغچه‌بان
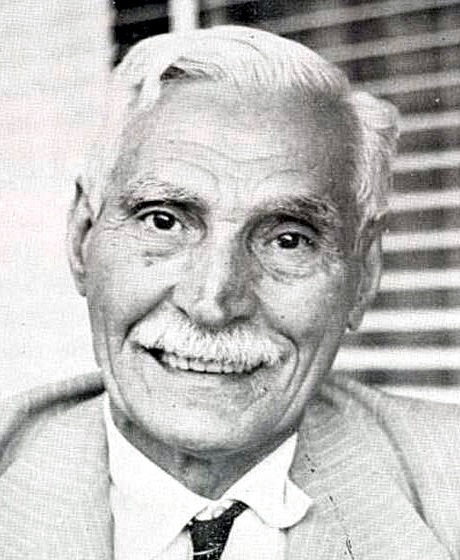
- Born: Jabbar Asgarzadeh; 9 May 1886; Yerevan, Russian Empire (now Armenia)
- Died: 25 November 1966 (aged 80); Tehran, Iran
- Occupation: Teacher of the deaf
- Children: 3 (including Samin)
- Website: www.baghcheban.net

Mirza Jabbar Asgarzadeh (Persian: میرزا جبار عسگرزاده) famously known as Jabbar Baghcheban (Persian: جبار باغچه‌بان) was an Iranian inventor. He is well known for establishing the first Iranian kindergarten and the first deaf school in Tabriz. He was also the inventor of Persian language cued speech.

Baghtcheban was the father of the late Iranian composer Samin Baghcheban. In total he had three children.

== Biography ==
Mirza Jabbar Asgarzadeh was born in Yerevan. The first kindergarten he established was called the baghche-ye atfal (باغچهٔ اطفال) which means 'children's garden'. That is why he was given the nickname baghcheban (باغچه‌بان) which literally means 'gardener' in the Persian language.

He founded a school for the deaf in 1924, located next to his kindergarten. In 1928 he wrote the first Iranian children's book in Persian. The book was called baba barfi (بابا برفی) which means 'snow father' in Persian.
